= List of named minor planets: 30000–39999 =

This is a partial list of named minor planets in numerical order. It contains a total of 2,081 entries as of 9 November 2026. Minor planets for which no article exist are displayed in grey color and redirect to the list of minor planets (see List of minor planets § Main index).

== From 30,000 to 39,999 ==
- 30000 Camenzind
- 30004 Mikewilliams
- 30005 Stevenchen
- 30007 Johnclarke
- 30008 Aroncoraor
- 30012 Sohamdaga
- 30017 Shaundatta
- 30018 Loemele
- 30022 Kathibaker
- 30024 Neildavey
- 30025 Benfreed
- 30027 Anubhavguha
- 30028 Yushihomma
- 30029 Preetikakani
- 30030 Joycekang
- 30031 Angelakong
- 30032 Kuszmaul
- 30033 Kevinlee
- 30035 Charlesliu
- 30036 Eshamaiti
- 30037 Rahulmehta
- 30039 Jameier
- 30040 Annemerrill
- 30042 Schmude
- 30043 Lisamichaels
- 30048 Sreyasmisra
- 30049 Violamocz
- 30050 Emilypang
- 30051 Jihopark
- 30053 Ivanpaskov
- 30054 Pereira
- 30055 Ajaysaini
- 30057 Sarasakowitz
- 30060 Davidseong
- 30061 Vishnushankar
- 30063 Jessicashi
- 30064 Kaitlynshin
- 30065 Asrinivasan
- 30066 Parthakker
- 30067 Natalieng
- 30068 Frankmelillo
- 30070 Thabitpulak
- 30073 Erichen
- 30080 Walterworman
- 30081 Zarinrahman
- 30085 Kevingarbe
- 30087 Georgeputnam
- 30088 Deprá
- 30089 Terikelley
- 30090 Grossano
- 30091 Stephenbrown
- 30092 Menke
- 30093 McClanahan
- 30094 Rolfebode
- 30095 Tarabode
- 30096 Glindadavidson
- 30097 Traino
- 30100 Christophergo
- 30109 Jaywilson
- 30110 Lisabreton
- 30111 Wendyslijk
- 30112 Weistrop
- 30113 Kylerkuehn
- 30114 Mooney
- 30117 Childress
- 30119 Lucamatone
- 30122 Elschweitzer
- 30123 Scottrippeon
- 30125 Mikekiser
- 30126 Haviland
- 30128 Shannonbunch
- 30129 Virmani
- 30130 Jeandillman
- 30136 Bakerfranke
- 30137 Sherryshaffer
- 30138 Gonyea
- 30140 Robpergolizzi
- 30141 Nelvenzon
- 30142 Debfrazier
- 30144 Minubasu
- 30146 Decandia
- 30147 Amyhammer
- 30149 Kellyriedell
- 30150 Laseminara
- 30151 Susanoffner
- 30152 Reneefallon
- 30153 Ostrander
- 30154 Christichil
- 30155 Warmuth
- 30157 Robertspira
- 30158 Mabdulla
- 30159 Behari
- 30160 Danielbruce
- 30161 Chrepta
- 30162 Courtney
- 30164 Arnobdas
- 30166 Leodeng
- 30167 Caredmonds
- 30168 Linusfreyer
- 30169 Raghavganesh
- 30170 Makaylaruth
- 30172 Giedraitis
- 30173 Greenwood
- 30174 Hollyjackson
- 30175 Adityajain
- 30176 Gelseyjaymes
- 30177 Khashayar
- 30179 Movva
- 30183 Murali
- 30184 Okasinski
- 30186 Ostojic
- 30187 Jamesroney
- 30188 Hafsasaeed
- 30190 Alexshelby
- 30191 Sivakumar
- 30192 Talarterzian
- 30193 Annikaurban
- 30194 Liamyoung
- 30195 Akdemir
- 30197 Nickbadyrka
- 30199 Ericbrown
- 30200 Terryburch
- 30201 Caruana
- 30203 Kimdavis
- 30204 Stevedoherty
- 30205 Mistyevans
- 30206 Jasonfricker
- 30208 Guigarcia
- 30209 Garciaarriola
- 30211 Sheilah
- 30216 Summerjohnson
- 30218 Paulaladd
- 30221 LeDonne
- 30222 Malecki
- 30225 Ellenzweibel
- 30226 Samuelleejackson
- 30227 Jansensturgeon
- 30228 Hushoucun
- 30229 Neilbowles
- 30230 Ralucarufu
- 30231 Patorojo
- 30232 Stephaniejarmak
- 30234 Dudziński
- 30235 Kimmiller
- 30240 Morgensen
- 30241 Donnamower
- 30242 Naymark
- 30244 Linhpham
- 30245 Paigesmith
- 30248 Kimstinson
- 30249 Zamora
- 30251 Ashkin
- 30252 Textorisová
- 30253 Vítek
- 30254 Kamiński
- 30255 Bohner
- 30257 Leejanel
- 30259 Catherineli
- 30264 Galluccio
- 30265 Rominagarcía
- 30267 Raghuvanshi
- 30268 Jessezhang
- 30269 Anandapadmanaban
- 30270 Chemparathy
- 30271 Brandoncui
- 30272 D'Mello
- 30273 Samepstein
- 30275 Eskow
- 30276 Noahgolowich
- 30277 Charlesgulian
- 30278 Gazeas
- 30279 Binnie
- 30280 Raderlane
- 30281 Horstman
- 30282 Jamessmith
- 30283 Shirleysmith
- 30285 Ellsworth-Bowers
- 30286 Klesman
- 30288 Conelalexander
- 30289 Richardcarlson
- 30290 Noble
- 30293 Scottnelson
- 30295 Anvitagupta
- 30296 Bricehuang
- 30297 Cupák
- 30298 Somyakhare
- 30299 Shashkishore
- 30300 Waagen
- 30301 Kuditipudi
- 30302 Kritilall
- 30304 Denisvida
- 30305 Severi
- 30306 Frigyesriesz
- 30307 Marcelriesz
- 30308 Ienli
- 30310 Alexanderlin
- 30312 Lilyliu
- 30314 Yelenam
- 30316 Scottmassa
- 30321 McCleary
- 30323 Anyam
- 30324 Pandya
- 30325 Reesabpathak
- 30326 Maxpine
- 30327 Prembabu
- 30328 Emilyspencer
- 30330 Tiffanysun
- 30332 Tanaytandon
- 30333 Stevenwang
- 30334 Michaelwiner
- 30336 Zhangyizhen
- 30337 Crystalzheng
- 30347 Pattyhunt
- 30348 Marizzabailey
- 30350 Beltecas
- 30353 Carothers
- 30357 Davisdon
- 30362 Jenniferdean
- 30363 Dellasantina
- 30365 Gregduran
- 30368 Ericferrante
- 30370 Jongoetz
- 30371 Johngorman
- 30372 Halback
- 30373 Mattharley
- 30374 Bobbiehinson
- 30375 Kathuang
- 30379 Molaro
- 30384 Robertirelan
- 30386 Philipjeffery
- 30388 Nicolejustice
- 30389 Ledoux
- 30396 Annleonard
- 30402 Esthergoddard
- 30405 Yunakwon
- 30406 Middleman
- 30407 Pantano
- 30409 Piccirillo
- 30411 Besse
- 30412 Anthonylagain
- 30413 Slatkin
- 30414 Pistacchi
- 30416 Schacht
- 30417 Staudt
- 30418 Jakobsteiner
- 30421 Jameschafer
- 30425 Silverman
- 30426 Philtalbot
- 30430 Robertoegel
- 30431 Michaeltran
- 30435 Slyusarev
- 30436 Busemann
- 30437 Michtchenko
- 30438 Yongikbyun
- 30439 Moe
- 30440 Larry
- 30441 Curly
- 30443 Stieltjes
- 30444 Shemp
- 30445 Stirling
- 30448 Yoshiomoriyama
- 30449 Caldas
- 30452 Callegari
- 30453 Cambioni
- 30454 Carrillosánchez
- 30455 Joelcastro
- 30473 Ethanbutson
- 30483 Harringtonpinto
- 30487 Dominikovacs
- 30488 Steinlechner
- 30509 Yukitrippel
- 30514 Chiomento
- 30521 Garyferland
- 30524 Mandushev
- 30525 Lenbright
- 30533 Saeidzoonemat
- 30534 Holler
- 30535 Sarahgreenstreet
- 30536 Erondón
- 30537 Matteocrismani
- 30539 Raissamuller
- 30541 Delgadillo
- 30548 Markburchell
- 30549 Dylanshort
- 30550 Curtschneider
- 30553 Arcoverde
- 30558 Jamesoconnor
- 30559 Cyrusavery
- 30562 Güttler
- 30564 Olomouc
- 30566 Stokes
- 30569 Dybczyński
- 30575 Anacarolina
- 30576 Lago
- 30577 Pinchuk
- 30578 Lawless
- 30585 Firenze
- 30593 Dangovski
- 30596 Amdeans
- 30698 Hippokoon
- 30704 Phegeus
- 30705 Idaios
- 30708 Echepolos
- 30717 Berkowski
- 30718 Records
- 30719 Isserstedt
- 30720 Fernándezlajús
- 30722 Biblioran
- 30724 Peterburgtrista
- 30725 Klimov
- 30767 Chriskraft
- 30769 Kaydash
- 30773 Schelde
- 30775 Lattu
- 30778 Döblin
- 30779 Sankt-Stephan
- 30785 Greeley
- 30786 Karkoschka
- 30788 Angekauffmann
- 30797 Chimborazo
- 30798 Graubünden
- 30805 Mikimasa
- 30821 Chernetenko
- 30826 Coulomb
- 30827 Lautenschläger
- 30828 Bethe
- 30829 Wolfwacker
- 30830 Jahn
- 30831 Seignovert
- 30832 Urbaincreve
- 30835 Waterloo
- 30836 Schnittke
- 30837 Steinheil
- 30838 Hitomiyamasaki
- 30840 Jackalice
- 30844 Hukeller
- 30847 Lampert
- 30850 Vonsiemens
- 30851 Reißfelder
- 30852 Debye
- 30857 Parsec
- 30879 Hiroshikanai
- 30881 Robertstevenson
- 30882 Tomhenning
- 30883 de Broglie
- 30886 Hayashitadashi
- 30888 Okitsumisaki
- 30917 Moehorgan
- 30924 Imamura
- 30925 Todahiroyuki
- 30928 Jefferson
- 30933 Grillparzer
- 30934 Bakerhansen
- 30935 Davasobel
- 30936 Basra
- 30937 Bashkirtseff
- 30938 Montmartre
- 30939 Samaritaine
- 30942 Helicaon
- 30943 Takeisakiyo
- 30944 Hiruma
- 30955 Weiser
- 30963 Mount Banzan
- 30991 Minenze
- 31000 Rockchic
- 31006 Katherine
- 31012 Jiangshiyang
- 31015 Boccardi
- 31020 Skarupa
- 31028 Cerulli
- 31031 Altiplano
- 31032 Scheidemann
- 31037 Mydon
- 31043 Sturm
- 31061 Tamao
- 31065 Beishizhang
- 31086 Gehringer
- 31087 Oirase
- 31091 Bettiventicinque
- 31092 Carolowilhelmina
- 31095 Buneiou
- 31097 Nucciomula
- 31098 Frankhill
- 31103 Elenagarcía
- 31104 Annanetrebko
- 31105 Oguniyamagata
- 31109 Janpalouš
- 31110 Clapas
- 31113 Stull
- 31122 Brooktaylor
- 31124 Slavíček
- 31129 Langyatai
- 31134 Zurria
- 31139 Garnavich
- 31147 Miriquidi
- 31151 Sajichugaku
- 31152 Daishinsai
- 31153 Enricaparri
- 31174 Rozelot
- 31175 Erikafuchs
- 31179 Gongju
- 31189 Tricomi
- 31190 Toussaint
- 31192 Aigoual
- 31196 Yulong
- 31201 Michellegrand
- 31203 Hersman
- 31230 Tuyouyou
- 31231 Uthmann
- 31232 Slavonice
- 31234 Bea
- 31238 Kroměříž
- 31239 Michaeljames
- 31240 Katrianne
- 31244 Guidomonzino
- 31249 Renéefleming
- 31254 Totucciogrisanti
- 31266 Tournefort
- 31267 Kuldiga
- 31268 Welty
- 31271 Nallino
- 31272 Makosinski
- 31276 Calvinrieder
- 31281 Stothers
- 31282 Nicoleticea
- 31283 Wanruomeng
- 31291 Yaoyue
- 31296 Matthewclement
- 31298 Chantaihei
- 31312 Fangerhai
- 31313 Kanwingyi
- 31319 Vespucci
- 31323 Lysá hora
- 31324 Jiřímrázek
- 31336 Chenyuhsin
- 31338 Lipperhey
- 31344 Agathon
- 31349 Uria-Monzon
- 31358 Garethcollins
- 31360 Huangyihsuan
- 31363 Shulga
- 31374 Hruskova
- 31375 Krystufek
- 31376 Leobauersfeld
- 31377 Kleinwort
- 31378 Neidinger
- 31380 Hegyesi
- 31384 Joséloisestévez
- 31385 Genovevavázquez
- 31387 Lehoucq
- 31389 Alexkaplan
- 31398 Lukedaly
- 31399 Susorney
- 31400 Dakshdua
- 31402 Negishi
- 31412 Andersonribeiro
- 31414 Rotarysusa
- 31415 Fenucci
- 31416 Peteworden
- 31418 Sosaoyarzabal
- 31419 Shafransky
- 31426 Davidlouapre
- 31429 Diegoazzaro
- 31431 Cabibbo
- 31435 Benhauck
- 31437 Verma
- 31438 Yasuhitohayashi
- 31439 Mieyamanaka
- 31442 Stark
- 31450 Stevepreston
- 31451 Joenickell
- 31453 Arnaudthiry
- 31458 Delrosso
- 31460 Jongsowfei
- 31461 Shannonlee
- 31462 Brchnelova
- 31463 Michalgeci
- 31464 Liscinsky
- 31465 Piyasiri
- 31466 Abualhassan
- 31468 Albastaki
- 31469 Aizawa
- 31470 Alagappan
- 31471 Sallyalbright
- 31473 Guangning
- 31474 Advaithanand
- 31475 Robbacchus
- 31476 Bocconcelli
- 31477 Meenakshi
- 31479 Botello
- 31480 Jonahbutler
- 31482 Caddell
- 31483 Caulfield
- 31487 Parthchopra
- 31489 Matthewchun
- 31490 Swapnavdeka
- 31491 Demessie
- 31492 Jennarose
- 31493 Fernando-Peiris
- 31494 Emmafreedman
- 31495 Sarahgalvin
- 31496 Glowacz
- 31500 Grutzik
- 31501 Williamhang
- 31502 Hellerstein
- 31503 Jessicahong
- 31504 Jaisonjain
- 31507 Williamjin
- 31508 Kanevsky
- 31510 Saumya
- 31511 Jessicakim
- 31512 Koyyalagunta
- 31513 Lafazan
- 31516 Leibowitz
- 31517 Mahoui
- 31519 Mimamarquez
- 31522 McCutchen
- 31523 Jessemichel
- 31525 Nickmiller
- 31531 ARRL
- 31550 Beckmaier
- 31551 Ashleyking
- 31555 Wheeler
- 31556 Shatner
- 31557 Holleybakich
- 31559 Alonmillet
- 31563 Bourdelledemicas
- 31569 Adriansonka
- 31570 Conjat
- 31573 Mohanty
- 31574 Moshova
- 31575 Nikhilmurthy
- 31576 Nandigala
- 31580 Bridgetoei
- 31581 Onnink
- 31582 Miraeparker
- 31584 Emaparker
- 31588 Harrypaul
- 31592 Jacobplaut
- 31593 Romapradhan
- 31594 Drewprevost
- 31595 Noahpritt
- 31596 Ragavender
- 31597 Allisonmarie
- 31598 Danielrudin
- 31599 Chloesherry
- 31600 Somasundaram
- 31605 Braschi
- 31613 Adamgreenberg
- 31617 Meeraradha
- 31618 Tharakan
- 31619 Jodietinker
- 31627 Ulmera
- 31628 Vorperian
- 31630 Jennywang
- 31631 Abbywilliams
- 31632 Stephaying
- 31633 Almonte
- 31635 Anandarao
- 31637 Bhimaraju
- 31639 Bodoni
- 31640 Johncaven
- 31641 Cevasco
- 31642 Soyounchoi
- 31643 Natashachugh
- 31647 Beauwigman
- 31648 Pedrosada
- 31650 Frýdek-Místek
- 31651 Edurnepasaban
- 31655 Averyclowes
- 31660 Maximiliandu
- 31661 Eggebraaten
- 31663 Anjani
- 31664 Randiiwessen
- 31665 Veblen
- 31671 Masatoshi
- 31673 Nayessda
- 31674 Westermann
- 31677 Audreyglende
- 31679 Glenngrimmett
- 31680 Josephuitt
- 31682 Kinsey
- 31684 Lindsay
- 31688 Bryantliu
- 31689 Sebmellen
- 31690 Nayamenezes
- 31696 Rohitmital
- 31697 Isaiahoneal
- 31698 Nikolaiortiz
- 31700 Naperez
- 31701 Ragula
- 31706 Singhani
- 31711 Suresh
- 31716 Matoonder
- 31719 Davidyue
- 31725 Anushazaman
- 31727 Amandalewis
- 31728 Rhondah
- 31729 Scharmen
- 31731 Johnwiley
- 31737 Carriecoombs
- 31744 Shimshock
- 31767 Jennimartin
- 31770 Melivanhouten
- 31771 Kirstenwright
- 31772 Asztalos
- 31774 Debralas
- 31777 Amywinegar
- 31778 Richardschnur
- 31780 Thomaskelley
- 31787 Darcylawson
- 31807 Shaunalennon
- 31823 Viète
- 31824 Elatus
- 31828 Martincordiner
- 31836 Poshedly
- 31838 Angelarob
- 31839 Depinto
- 31840 Normnegus
- 31844 Mattwill
- 31846 Elainegillum
- 31848 Mikemattei
- 31853 Rahulmital
- 31854 Darshanashah
- 31858 Raykanipe
- 31859 Zemaitis
- 31861 Darleshimizu
- 31862 Garfinkle
- 31863 Hazelcoffman
- 31871 Siqueiros
- 31872 Terkán
- 31873 Toliou
- 31874 Kosiarek
- 31875 Saksena
- 31876 Jenkens
- 31877 Davideverett
- 31883 Susanstern
- 31884 Evangelista
- 31885 Greggweger
- 31886 Verlisak
- 31888 Polizzi
- 31893 Rodriguezalvarez
- 31896 Gaydarov
- 31897 Brooksdasilva
- 31899 Adityamohan
- 31901 Amitscheer
- 31902 Raymondwang
- 31903 Euniceyou
- 31904 Haoruochen
- 31905 Likinpong
- 31907 Wongsumming
- 31909 Chenweitung
- 31910 Moustafa
- 31911 Luciafauth
- 31912 Lukasgrafner
- 31916 Arnehensel
- 31917 Lukashohne
- 31918 Onkargujral
- 31919 Carragher
- 31920 Annamcevoy
- 31922 Alsharif
- 31925 Krutovskiy
- 31926 Alhamood
- 31928 Limzhengtheng
- 31931 Sipiera
- 31933 Tanyizhao
- 31934 Benjamintan
- 31935 Midgley
- 31936 Bernardsmit
- 31937 Kangsunwoo
- 31938 Nattapong
- 31939 Thananon
- 31940 Sutthiluk
- 31943 Tahsinelmas
- 31944 Seyitherdem
- 31946 Sahilabbi
- 31948 Marciarieke
- 31951 Alexisallen
- 31952 Bialtdecelie
- 31953 Bontha
- 31954 Georgiebotev
- 31956 Wald
- 31957 Braunstein
- 31959 Keianacave
- 31960 Fabioferrari
- 31961 Andreaferrero
- 31962 Rayharvey
- 31963 Tanjamichalik
- 31969 Yihuachen
- 31971 Beatricechoi
- 31972 Carlycrump
- 31973 Ashwindatta
- 31975 Johndean
- 31976 Niyatidesai
- 31977 Devalapurkar
- 31978 Jeremyphilip
- 31980 Axelfeldmann
- 31982 Johnwallis
- 31984 Unger
- 31985 Andrewryan
- 31988 Jasonfiacco
- 31991 Royghosh
- 31996 Goecknerwald
- 31998 Maxlevine
- 32001 Golbin
- 32002 Gorokhovsky
- 32005 Roberthalfon
- 32006 Hallisey
- 32007 Amirhelmy
- 32008 Adriángalád
- 32013 Elkekersten
- 32014 Bida
- 32018 Robhenning
- 32019 Krithikaiyer
- 32021 Lilyjenkins
- 32022 Sarahjenkins
- 32025 Karanjerath
- 32027 Jupitercheng
- 32031 Joyjin
- 32032 Askandola
- 32033 Arjunkapoor
- 32034 Sophiakorner
- 32037 Deepikakurup
- 32038 Kwiecinski
- 32044 Lakmazaheri
- 32047 Wenjiali
- 32048 Kathyliu
- 32049 Jonathanma
- 32051 Sadhikamalladi
- 32052 Diyamathur
- 32053 Demetrimaxim
- 32054 Musunuri
- 32056 Abrarnadroo
- 32057 Ethannovek
- 32058 Charlesnoyes
- 32059 Ruchipandya
- 32060 Wyattpontius
- 32062 Amolpunjabi
- 32063 Pusapaty
- 32065 Radulovacki
- 32066 Ramayya
- 32067 Ranganathan
- 32069 Mayarao
- 32070 Michaelretchin
- 32071 Matthewretchin
- 32072 Revanur
- 32073 Cassidyryan
- 32074 Kevinsadhu
- 32078 Jamesavoldelli
- 32079 Hughsavoldelli
- 32080 Sanashareef
- 32082 Sominsky
- 32085 Tomback
- 32086 Viviannetu
- 32087 Vemulapalli
- 32088 Liamwallace
- 32089 Wojtania
- 32090 Craigworley
- 32091 Jasonwu
- 32092 Brianxia
- 32093 Zhengyan
- 32096 Puckett
- 32101 Williamyin
- 32102 Gavinmoriarty
- 32103 Reʼemsari
- 32104 Emmarainey
- 32105 Plesko
- 32106 Dawngraninger
- 32107 Ylitalo
- 32108 Jovanzhang
- 32109 Brucksyal
- 32110 Wendycaldwell
- 32111 Mallorydecoster
- 32112 Katiekumamoto
- 32113 Mikeowen
- 32120 Stevezheng
- 32121 Joshuazhou
- 32128 Jayzussman
- 32131 Ravindran
- 32132 Andrewamini
- 32142 Tristanguillot
- 32144 Humes
- 32145 Katberman
- 32146 Paigebrown
- 32150 Crumpton
- 32151 Seanmarshall
- 32152 Hyland
- 32153 Laurenmcgraw
- 32163 Claireburch
- 32184 Yamaura
- 32185 Noonan
- 32186 McMullan
- 32191 Bensharkey
- 32194 Mahlke
- 32197 Judylynnpalmer
- 32200 Seiicyoshida
- 32201 Heathermckay
- 32202 Cogswell
- 32207 Mairepercy
- 32208 Johnpercy
- 32213 Joshuachoe
- 32214 Colburn
- 32217 Beverlyge
- 32222 Charlesvest
- 32226 Vikulgupta
- 32229 Higashino
- 32233 Georgehou
- 32234 Jesslihuang
- 32237 Jagadeesan
- 32242 Jagota
- 32250 Karthik
- 32260 Schult
- 32261 Podlewskagaca
- 32262 Marinferrais
- 32263 Kusnierkiewicz
- 32264 Cathjesslai
- 32267 Hermannweyl
- 32270 Inokuchihiroo
- 32272 Hasegawayuya
- 32275 Limichael
- 32276 Allenliu
- 32277 Helenliu
- 32278 Makaram
- 32279 Marshall
- 32280 Rachelmashal
- 32281 Shreyamenon
- 32282 Arnoldmong
- 32288 Terui
- 32294 Zajonc
- 32295 Ravichandran
- 32296 Aninsayana
- 32298 Kunalshroff
- 32299 Srinivas
- 32300 Uwamanzunna
- 32302 Mayavarma
- 32308 Sreyavemuri
- 32310 Asherwillner
- 32311 Josephineyu
- 32313 Zhangmichael
- 32314 Rachelzhang
- 32315 Clarezhu
- 32379 Markadame
- 32381 Bellomo
- 32384 Scottbest
- 32387 D'Egidio
- 32389 Michflannory
- 32393 Galinato
- 32398 Métayer
- 32399 Epifani
- 32400 Itaparica
- 32402 Annametke
- 32405 Jameshill
- 32406 Tracyhughes
- 32424 Caryjames
- 32428 Peterlangley
- 32432 Stansberry
- 32436 Eranofek
- 32438 Wonyonghan
- 32439 Sangjoonkim
- 32441 Youngrokkim
- 32442 Heejaelee
- 32443 Davidhaack
- 32449 Crystalmiller
- 32453 Kanamishogo
- 32462 Janmitchener
- 32481 Inasaridze
- 32483 Kumar
- 32486 Leospohl
- 32487 Eschrig
- 32496 Deïopites
- 32516 Simoneieva
- 32518 Ktramesh
- 32519 Timholt
- 32520 Jontihorner
- 32522 Judiepersons
- 32524 Roberthowie
- 32525 Kynanhughson
- 32527 Junko
- 32531 Ulrikababiaková
- 32532 Thereus
- 32533 Tranpham
- 32544 Debjaniroy
- 32547 Shandroff
- 32549 Taricco
- 32550 Sharonthomas
- 32552 Jennithomas
- 32556 Jennivibber
- 32561 Waldron
- 32562 Caseywarner
- 32563 Nicolezaidi
- 32564 Glass
- 32569 Deming
- 32570 Peruindiana
- 32571 Brayton
- 32579 Allendavia
- 32580 Avbalasingam
- 32582 Mayachandar
- 32584 Michaelcollins
- 32585 Tardivel
- 32590 Cynthiachen
- 32593 Crotty
- 32594 Nathandeng
- 32596 Čepek
- 32597 Alicelucchetti
- 32598 Vanialorenzi
- 32599 Pedromachado
- 32603 Ariaeppinger
- 32604 Meganmansfield
- 32605 Lucy
- 32606 Markkanen
- 32607 Portell
- 32608 Hallas
- 32609 Jamesfagan
- 32610 Siennafink
- 32611 Ananyaganesh
- 32612 Ghatare
- 32613 Tseyuenman
- 32614 Hacegarcia
- 32616 Nadinehan
- 32617 Tiegs
- 32618 Leungkamcheung
- 32619 Lynnsawyer
- 32621 Talcott
- 32622 Yuewaichun
- 32623 Samuelkahn
- 32628 Lazorik
- 32630 Ethanlevy
- 32631 Majzoub
- 32633 Honguyang
- 32634 Sonjamichaluk
- 32720 Simoeisios
- 32724 Woerlitz
- 32726 Chromios
- 32730 Lamarr
- 32731 Annaivanovna
- 32734 Kryukov
- 32735 Strekalov
- 32766 Voskresenskoe
- 32768 Alexandripatov
- 32770 Starchik
- 32776 Nriag
- 32796 Ehrenfest
- 32807 Quarenghi
- 32808 Bischoff
- 32809 Sommerfeld
- 32810 Steinbach
- 32811 Apisaon
- 32815 Mitsufumi
- 32821 Posch
- 32853 Döbereiner
- 32854 Sekitakayuki
- 32855 Zollitsch
- 32858 Kitakamigawa
- 32890 Schwob
- 32891 Amatrice
- 32892 Prufrock
- 32893 van der Waals
- 32897 Curtharris
- 32899 Knigge
- 32909 Uemuramahito
- 32911 Cervara
- 32919 Ohashi
- 32928 Xiejialin
- 32931 Ferioli
- 32938 Ivanopaci
- 32939 Nasimi
- 32943 Sandyryan
- 32944 Gussalli
- 32945 Lecce
- 32969 Motohikosato
- 32987 Uyuni
- 32990 Sayo-hime
- 33000 Chenjiansheng
- 33002 Everest
- 33004 Dianesipiera
- 33008 Tatematsu
- 33010 Enricoprosperi
- 33011 Kurtiscarsch
- 33012 Eddieirizarry
- 33014 Kalinich
- 33017 Wroński
- 33027 Brouillac
- 33031 Paolofini
- 33034 Dianadamrau
- 33035 Pareschi
- 33040 Pavelmayer
- 33044 Erikdavy
- 33054 Eduardorossi
- 33056 Ogunimachi
- 33058 Kovařík
- 33059 Matsuoka
- 33061 Václavmorava
- 33100 Udine
- 33103 Pintar
- 33113 Julabeth
- 33117 Ashinimodi
- 33118 Naiknaware
- 33129 Ivankrasko
- 33135 Davidrisoldi
- 33137 Strejček
- 33151 Tomasobelloni
- 33154 Talent
- 33157 Pertile
- 33158 Rúfus
- 33160 Denismukwege
- 33162 Sofiarandich
- 33163 Alainaspect
- 33165 Joschhambsch
- 33175 Isabellegleeson
- 33179 Arsènewenger
- 33181 Aalokpatwa
- 33187 Pizzolato
- 33188 Shreya
- 33189 Ritzdorf
- 33190 Sigrest
- 33191 Santiagostone
- 33193 Emhyr
- 33195 Davenyadav
- 33196 Kaienyang
- 33197 Charlallen
- 33198 Mackewicz
- 33200 Carasummit
- 33201 Thomasartiss
- 33202 Davignon
- 33205 Graigmarx
- 33210 Johnrobertson
- 33213 Diggs
- 33215 Garyjones
- 33217 Bonnybasu
- 33219 De Los Santos
- 33221 Raqueljacobson
- 33222 Gillingham
- 33224 Lesrogers
- 33226 Melissamacko
- 33230 Libbyrobertson
- 33241 Jeanmedas
- 33247 Iannacone
- 33248 Nataliehowell
- 33249 Pamelasvenson
- 33251 Marcvandenbroeck
- 33254 Sundaresakumar
- 33255 Kathybush
- 33258 Femariebustos
- 33261 Ginagarlie
- 33262 Marklewis
- 33263 Willhutch
- 33264 Maryrogers
- 33269 Broccoli
- 33270 Katiecrysup
- 33274 Beaubingham
- 33282 Arjunramani
- 33285 Martínleiva
- 33287 Lasue
- 33288 Shixian
- 33290 Carloszuluaga
- 33296 Jennylarson
- 33319 Kunqu
- 33323 Lucaspaganini
- 33328 Archanaverma
- 33329 Stefanwan
- 33330 Barèges
- 33334 Turon
- 33335 Guibert
- 33337 Amberyang
- 33343 Madorobin
- 33344 Madymesple
- 33345 Nataliedessay
- 33346 Sabinedevieilhe
- 33347 Maryzhu
- 33348 Stevelliott
- 33353 Chattopadhyay
- 33372 Jonathanchung
- 33376 Medi
- 33377 Večerníček
- 33379 Rohandalvi
- 33382 Indranidas
- 33383 Edupuganti
- 33384 Jacyfang
- 33389 Isairisgreco
- 33390 Hajlasz
- 33392 Blakehord
- 33393 Khandelwal
- 33394 Nathaniellee
- 33395 Dylanli
- 33396 Vrindamadan
- 33397 Prathiknaidu
- 33399 Emilyann
- 33400 Laurapierson
- 33401 Radiya-Dixit
- 33402 Canizares
- 33405 Rekhtman
- 33406 Saltzman
- 33408 Mananshah
- 33412 Arjunsubra
- 33413 Alecsun
- 33414 Jessicatian
- 33415 Felixwang
- 33418 Jacksonweaver
- 33419 Wellman
- 33420 Derekwoo
- 33421 Byronxu
- 33433 Maurilia
- 33434 Scottmanley
- 33437 Ordenovic
- 33438 Mauriziopajola
- 33440 Nicholasprato
- 33441 Catherineprato
- 33442 Cassandrarunyon
- 33443 Schambeau
- 33444 Shaddad
- 33446 Michaelyang
- 33448 Aaronyeiser
- 33450 Allender
- 33451 Michaelarney
- 33452 Olivebryan
- 33453 Townley
- 33454 Neilclaffey
- 33455 Coakley
- 33456 Ericacurran
- 33457 Cutillo
- 33458 Fialkow
- 33462 Tophergee
- 33463 Bettinagregg
- 33464 Melahudock
- 33466 Thomaslarson
- 33467 Johnlieb
- 33468 Nelsoneric
- 33471 Ozuna
- 33472 Yunorperalta
- 33473 Porterfield
- 33476 Gilanareiss
- 33478 Deniselivon
- 33480 Bartolucci
- 33484 Nathanroth
- 33486 Edreynolds
- 33487 Jeanpierrerivet
- 33488 Darrelrobertson
- 33489 Myungjinkim
- 33490 Roggemans
- 33491 Tonyroman
- 33492 Christirogers
- 33495 Schaferjames
- 33498 Juliesmith
- 33499 Stanton
- 33501 Juliethompson
- 33502 Janetwaldeck
- 33503 Dasilvaborges
- 33504 Rebrouwer
- 33508 Drewnik
- 33509 Mogilny
- 33511 Austinwang
- 33514 Changpeihsuan
- 33515 Linbohan
- 33516 Timonen
- 33517 Paulfoltin
- 33518 Stoetzer
- 33520 Ichige
- 33522 Chizumimaeta
- 33523 Warashina
- 33524 Rousselot
- 33525 Teresinha
- 33528 Jinzeman
- 33529 Henden
- 33532 Gabriellacoli
- 33534 Meiyamamura
- 33535 Alshaikh
- 33536 Charpugdee
- 33537 Doungnga
- 33538 Jaredbergen
- 33539 Elenaberman
- 33544 Jerold
- 33550 Blackburn
- 33553 Nagai
- 33555 Nataliebush
- 33556 Brennanclark
- 33559 Laurencooper
- 33560 D'Alessandro
- 33561 Brianjasondu
- 33562 Amydunphy
- 33564 Miriamshira
- 33565 Samferguson
- 33567 Sulekhfrederic
- 33568 Godishala
- 33569 Nikhilgopal
- 33570 Jagruenstein
- 33571 Jaygupta
- 33572 Mandolin
- 33573 Hugrace
- 33574 Shailaja
- 33575 Joshuajacob
- 33580 Priyankajain
- 33581 Rajeevjha
- 33582 Tiashajoardar
- 33583 Karamchedu
- 33584 Austinkatzer
- 33586 Keeley
- 33587 Arianakim
- 33589 Edwardkim
- 33590 Sreelakshmi
- 33591 Landsberger
- 33592 Kathrynanna
- 33594 Ralphlawton
- 33595 Jiwoolee
- 33596 Taesoolee
- 33598 Christineliu
- 33599 Mckennaloop
- 33600 Davidlu
- 33602 Varunmandi
- 33603 Saramason
- 33604 McChesney
- 33605 McCue
- 33606 Brandonmuncan
- 33607 Archanamurali
- 33608 Paladugu
- 33609 Harishpalani
- 33610 Payra
- 33613 Pendharkar
- 33614 Meganploch
- 33617 Kailashraman
- 33619 Dominickrowan
- 33621 Sathish
- 33622 Sedigh
- 33623 Kyraseevers
- 33624 Omersiddiqui
- 33625 Slepyan
- 33626 Jasonsmith
- 33628 Spettel
- 33630 Swathiravi
- 33633 Strickland
- 33634 Strickler
- 33655 Sumathipala
- 33660 Rishishankar
- 33661 Sophiaswartz
- 33662 Tacescu
- 33667 Uttripathii
- 33677 Truell
- 33680 Vasconcelos
- 33681 Wamsley
- 33682 Waylonreid
- 33684 Xiaomichael
- 33685 Younglove
- 33687 Julianbain
- 33688 Meghnabehari
- 33690 Noahcain
- 33691 Andrewchiang
- 33696 Crouchley
- 33699 Jessiegan
- 33700 Gluckman
- 33701 Gotthold
- 33702 Spencergreen
- 33703 Anthonyhill
- 33704 Herinkang
- 33713 Mithravamshi
- 33714 Sarakaufman
- 33725 Robertkent
- 33727 Kummel
- 33734 Stephenlitt
- 33737 Helenlyons
- 33740 Arjunmoorthy
- 33746 Sombart
- 33747 Clingan
- 33748 Davegault
- 33750 Davehiggins
- 33761 Honoranavid
- 33762 Sanjayseshan
- 33789 Sharmacam
- 33799 Myra
- 33800 Gross
- 33801 Emilyshi
- 33803 Julienpeloton
- 33806 Shrivastava
- 33809 Petrescu
- 33810 Tangirala
- 33811 Scottobin
- 33814 Viswesh
- 33817 Fariswald
- 33823 Mariorigutti
- 33825 Reganwill
- 33826 Kevynadams
- 33829 Asherson
- 33832 Johnplane
- 33834 Hannahkaplan
- 33838 Brandabaker
- 33845 Aprilrussell
- 33850 Mohammadsaki
- 33852 Baschnagel
- 33856 Rutuparekh
- 33861 Boucvalt
- 33863 Elfriederwin
- 33869 Brunnermatt
- 33871 Locastillo
- 33872 Kristichung
- 33875 Laurencooney
- 33879 Kierstendeen
- 33882 Schönbächler
- 33886 Lilydeveau
- 33889 Jengebo
- 33892 Meligingrich
- 33896 Hickson
- 33897 Erikagreen
- 33898 Kendra
- 33902 Ingoldsby
- 33903 Youssefmoulane
- 33904 Janardhanan
- 33905 Leyajoykutty
- 33907 Christykrenek
- 33910 Lestarge
- 33912 Melissanoland
- 33917 Kellyoconnor
- 33918 Janiscoville
- 33920 Trivisonno
- 33923 Juliewarren
- 33924 Rosanaaraujo
- 33926 Normand
- 33927 Jenniferscully
- 33928 Aswinsekhar
- 33929 Lisaprato
- 33931 Alexeysergeyev
- 33932 Keane
- 33933 Timlister
- 33936 Johnwells
- 33937 Raphaelmarschall
- 33940 Morgado
- 33941 Mouginot
- 33942 Davidmiller
- 33958 Zaferiou
- 33961 Macinleyneve
- 33963 Moranhidalgo
- 33964 Patrickshober
- 33970 Conorbenson
- 33971 Alexdavis
- 33972 Fuentesmuñoz
- 33973 Xiyunhou
- 33974 Alexmeyer
- 33975 Shotatakahashi
- 33976 Van Wal
- 33979 Sunhaochun
- 33990 Kathleenmcbride
- 33991 Weixunjing
- 33994 Regidufour
- 34000 Martinmatl
- 34002 Movsesian
- 34003 Ivozell
- 34004 Gregorini
- 34010 Tassiloschwarz
- 34011 Divyakranthi
- 34012 Prashaant
- 34014 Pingali
- 34016 Chaitanya
- 34017 Geeve
- 34021 Suhanijain
- 34024 Cormaclarkin
- 34025 Caolannbrady
- 34026 Valpagliarino
- 34028 Wuhuiyi
- 34030 Tabuchi
- 34031 Fukumitsu
- 34034 Shehadeh
- 34038 Abualragheb
- 34039 Torsteinvik
- 34042 Espeseth
- 34044 Obafial
- 34047 Gloria
- 34049 Myrelleangela
- 34053 Carlquines
- 34063 Mariamakarova
- 34069 Andrewsteele
- 34077 Yoshiakifuse
- 34079 Samoylova
- 34080 Clarakeng
- 34081 Chowkitmun
- 34083 Feretova
- 34088 Satokosuka
- 34089 Smoter
- 34090 Cewhang
- 34100 Thapa
- 34101 Hesrivastava
- 34102 Shawnzhang
- 34103 Suganthkannan
- 34104 Jeremiahpate
- 34106 Sakhrani
- 34107 Kashfiarahman
- 34123 Uedayukika
- 34125 Biancospino
- 34126 Cornaa
- 34127 Adamnayak
- 34128 Hannahbrown
- 34129 Madisonsneve
- 34130 Isabellaivy
- 34132 Theoguerin
- 34133 Charlesfenske
- 34134 Zlokapa
- 34135 Rahulsubra
- 34137 Lonnielinda
- 34138 Frasso Sabino
- 34139 Lucabarcelo
- 34141 Antonwu
- 34142 Sachinkonan
- 34143 Heeric
- 34144 Alexandersun
- 34147 Vengadesan
- 34148 Marchuo
- 34152 Kendrazhang
- 34153 Deeannguo
- 34154 Anushkanair
- 34156 Gopalakrishnan
- 34158 Rachelchang
- 34159 Ryanthorpe
- 34161 Michaellee
- 34162 Yegnesh
- 34163 Neyveli
- 34164 Anikacheerla
- 34165 Nikhilcheerla
- 34166 Neildeshmukh
- 34172 Camillemiles
- 34175 Joshuadong
- 34176 Balamurugan
- 34177 Amandawilson
- 34178 Sarahmarie
- 34179 Bryanchun
- 34180 Jessicayoung
- 34181 Patnaik
- 34182 Sachan
- 34183 Yeshdoctor
- 34184 Hegde
- 34187 Tomaino
- 34188 Clarawagner
- 34189 Ambatipudi
- 34190 Erinsmith
- 34191 Jakhete
- 34192 Sappington
- 34193 Annakoonce
- 34194 Serenajing
- 34197 Susrinivasan
- 34198 Oliverleitner
- 34199 Amyjin
- 34200 Emmasun
- 34202 Sionaprasad
- 34204 Quryshi
- 34205 Mizerak
- 34206 Zhiyuewang
- 34208 Danielzhang
- 34215 Stutigarg
- 34218 Padiyath
- 34219 Megantang
- 34220 Pelagiamajoni
- 34224 Maggiechen
- 34225 Fridberg
- 34227 Daveyhuang
- 34231 Isanisingh
- 34233 Caldwell
- 34234 Andrewfang
- 34235 Ellafeiner
- 34236 Firester
- 34237 Sarahgao
- 34239 Louisgolowich
- 34240 Charleyhutch
- 34241 Skylerjones
- 34245 Andrewkomo
- 34246 Kopparapu
- 34249 Leolo
- 34250 Mamichael
- 34251 Rohanmehrotra
- 34252 Orlovsky
- 34253 Nitya
- 34254 Mihirpatel
- 34256 Advaitpatil
- 34258 Pentland
- 34259 Abprabhakaran
- 34261 Musharahman
- 34262 Michaelren
- 34264 Sadhuka
- 34266 Schweinfurth
- 34267 Haniya
- 34268 Gracetian
- 34271 Vinjaivale
- 34272 Veeramacheneni
- 34273 Franklynwang
- 34277 Davidxingwu
- 34278 Justinxie
- 34279 Alicezhang
- 34280 Victoradler
- 34281 Albritton
- 34282 Applegate
- 34283 Bagley
- 34284 Seancampbell
- 34285 Dorothydady
- 34288 Bevindaglen
- 34289 Johndell
- 34293 Khiemdoba
- 34294 Taylordufford
- 34297 Willfrazer
- 34300 Brendafrost
- 34302 Riagalanos
- 34304 Alainagarza
- 34307 Arielhaas
- 34308 Roberthall
- 34310 Markhannum
- 34312 Deahaupt
- 34313 Lisahevner
- 34314 Jasonlee
- 34316 Christineleo
- 34317 Fabianmak
- 34319 Neilmilburn
- 34320 Davidmonge
- 34321 Russellmotter
- 34322 Marknandor
- 34323 Williamrose
- 34324 Jeremyschwartz
- 34325 Terrencevale
- 34326 Zhaurova
- 34328 Jackalbright
- 34329 Sribhimaraju
- 34330 Bissoondial
- 34331 Annadu
- 34332 Alicefeng
- 34333 Roycorgross
- 34334 Georgiagrace
- 34335 Ahmadismail
- 34336 Willjenkins
- 34337 Mihirjoshi
- 34338 Shreyaskar
- 34342 Asmikumar
- 34343 Kumaran
- 34345 Gabriellalui
- 34346 Varunmadan
- 34351 Decatur
- 34354 Johnmadland
- 34355 Mefford
- 34356 Gahamuriel
- 34357 Amaraorth
- 34363 Prawira
- 34364 Katequinn
- 34365 Laurareilly
- 34366 Rosavestal
- 34367 Kennedyrogers
- 34372 Bentleysiems
- 34379 Slettnes
- 34380 Pratikvangal
- 34387 Venkatesh
- 34388 Wylonis
- 34391 Garyzhan
- 34392 Afroz
- 34393 Cindyallen
- 34397 Rosaliebarber
- 34398 Terryschmidt
- 34399 Hachiojihigashi
- 34400 Kimbaxter
- 34401 Kaibeecher
- 34402 Seamusanderson
- 34403 Sessin
- 34404 Jaybuddi
- 34405 Caitlinshearer
- 34406 Kristenconn
- 34408 Simonanghel
- 34409 Venturini
- 34412 Tamicruz
- 34414 MacLennan
- 34415 Racheldragos
- 34418 Juliegodfrey
- 34419 Corning
- 34420 Peterpau
- 34424 Utashima
- 34432 Groebe
- 34433 Kavars
- 34441 Thomaslee
- 34443 Markmadland
- 34444 Kellmcallister
- 34446 Karenmccoy
- 34447 Mesidor
- 34450 Zashamickey
- 34451 Rebohearn
- 34452 Jenniparker
- 34453 Elisapeters
- 34456 Lydiareznik
- 34457 Leahroberts
- 34462 Stoffregen
- 34465 Swaminathan
- 34466 Ognicholls
- 34467 Raphotter
- 34469 Danishmahmood
- 34470 Chouruihua
- 34471 Fanyueyang
- 34472 Guxieran
- 34473 Linkairui
- 34474 Zhangjingru
- 34475 Zhangyuhui
- 34477 Muntz
- 34478 Jonasboukamp
- 34479 Dunschen
- 34482 Jessikirchner
- 34484 Kubetzko
- 34485 Nullmeier
- 34488 Lennartresch
- 34490 Danielkang
- 34491 Mohammedsuhail
- 34492 Swasthikpadma
- 34494 Shikarpur
- 34496 Viswanath
- 34497 Fionnferreira
- 34498 Aaronhannon
- 34499 Yusukesakai
- 34503 Tsuchida
- 34504 Tsuzuku
- 34509 Kuwehan
- 34511 Aleenasaji
- 34522 Cadores
- 34523 Manzanero
- 34524 Eugenerivera
- 34525 Paszkowski
- 34527 Fransanmartins
- 34534 Nogueira
- 34539 Gabrielsilva
- 34541 Gustavosanreyes
- 34543 Davidbriggs
- 34544 Omarsanreyes
- 34545 Chirita
- 34551 Andrianova
- 34552 Belousova
- 34555 Yuliamaslova
- 34558 Annasavelyeva
- 34559 Aldossary
- 34567 Weidekoo
- 34569 Bryanlim
- 34570 Shawnlim
- 34571 Dominicyap
- 34576 Leeshangjung
- 34580 Yenpohsun
- 34583 Dmitriivavilov
- 34584 Martintowner
- 34585 Torrano
- 34586 Filipemonteiro
- 34587 Vieiraneto
- 34589 Sarahadamo
- 34591 Saadhahmed
- 34592 Amirtharaj
- 34594 Rohanarora
- 34597 Sondy
- 34599 Burzinbalsara
- 34604 Vilhena
- 34611 Nacogdoches
- 34616 Andrewbennett
- 34619 Swagat
- 34620 Edwinbodoni
- 34625 Bollimpalli
- 34628 Samaboyea
- 34632 Sarahbroas
- 34633 Megancantwell
- 34634 Anjalichadha
- 34636 Lauwingkai
- 34644 Yatinchandar
- 34645 Vieiramartins
- 34646 Niaclements
- 34647 Ankushdhawan
- 34650 Dunkenberger
- 34651 Edamadaka
- 34652 Simoneevans
- 34659 Damyasouami
- 34660 Mickeyvillarreal
- 34665 Akbarwhizin
- 34666 Bohyunsan
- 34675 Feldbush
- 34677 Hunterwilliams
- 34678 Hansenestruch
- 34680 Anahumphrey
- 34681 Suhahussain
- 34687 Isahaku
- 34689 Flewelling
- 34696 Risoldi
- 34703 Wozniakiewicz
- 34708 Grasset
- 34712 Zexixing
- 34713 Yeşiltaş
- 34714 Haozhang
- 34716 Guzzo
- 34717 Mirkovilli
- 34718 Cantagalli
- 34729 Natalianoel
- 34730 Rainajain
- 34731 Ronitjain
- 34737 Parkerjou
- 34738 Hulbert
- 34739 Maryalice
- 34740 Emmakeeler
- 34741 Alyssakeirn
- 34743 Kollipara
- 34746 Thoon
- 34752 Venkatkrishnan
- 34753 Zdeněkmatyáš
- 34760 Ciccone
- 34766 Everettkroll
- 34769 Remilabeille
- 34770 Leyendecker
- 34771 Lilauren
- 34772 Lirachel
- 34775 Zinzi
- 34778 Huhunglick
- 34779 Chungchiyung
- 34780 Nikhillohe
- 34784 Lukelong
- 34786 Odeh
- 34788 Samuellossef
- 34789 Brucemckean
- 34791 Ericcraine
- 34792 Hsiehcheching
- 34796 Rheamalhotra
- 34797 Alicemartynova
- 34799 Mcdonaldboyer
- 34800 Evanmeade
- 34802 Anwesha
- 34808 Bocosur
- 34814 Muthukumar
- 34815 Wongfaye
- 34816 Billybarr
- 34817 Shiominemoto
- 34819 Nandininaidu
- 34821 Oyetunji
- 34822 Dhruvikparikh
- 34823 Lillipetersen
- 34828 Ishapuri
- 34830 Annaquinlan
- 34831 Krithikramesh
- 34836 Ronakroy
- 34837 Berilsaygin
- 34838 Lazowski
- 34840 Lawwaikuen
- 34841 Ruthgottesman
- 34844 Malavshah
- 34846 Vincent
- 34852 Shteyman
- 34854 Paquifrutos
- 34855 Annaspektor
- 34856 Savithas
- 34857 Sutaria
- 34859 Lamshanmuk
- 34862 Utkarshtandon
- 34863 Lientang
- 34871 Howaiho
- 34874 Tolwani
- 34876 Sofiatomov
- 34877 Tremsin
- 34879 Tripathiishan
- 34890 Vasikaran
- 34891 Elizabethpaige
- 34892 Evapalisa
- 34893 Mihomasatoshi
- 34901 Mauna Loa
- 34919 Imelda
- 34978 van 't Hoff
- 34993 Euaimon
- 34995 Dainihonshi
- 34996 Mitokoumon
- 35053 Rojyurij
- 35056 Cullers
- 35062 Sakuranosyou
- 35076 Yataro
- 35087 von Sydow
- 35093 Akicity
- 35137 Meudon
- 35141 Tomitayoshikuni
- 35143 Harimoto
- 35165 Québec
- 35169 Araake
- 35170 Mizunochisato
- 35171 Maedakoji
- 35172 Miyaharamisao
- 35197 Longmire
- 35222 Delbarrio
- 35229 Benckert
- 35231 Sugimotojunya
- 35233 Krčín
- 35237 Matzner
- 35239 Ottoseydl
- 35254 Noriko
- 35265 Takeosaitou
- 35268 Panoramix
- 35269 Idéfix
- 35270 Molinari
- 35274 Kenziarino
- 35283 Bradtimerson
- 35286 Takaoakihiro
- 35295 Omo
- 35298 Azumachiharu
- 35299 Kishisayoko
- 35313 Hangtianyuan
- 35316 Monella
- 35324 Orlandi
- 35325 Claudiaguarnieri
- 35326 Lucastrabla
- 35334 Yarkovsky
- 35343 Tomoda
- 35346 Ivanoferri
- 35347 Tallinn
- 35350 Lespaul
- 35352 Texas
- 35353 Naďapravcová
- 35355 Honzík
- 35356 Vondrák
- 35357 Haraldlesch
- 35358 Lorifini
- 35364 Donaldpray
- 35365 Cooney
- 35366 Kaifeng
- 35367 Dobrédílo
- 35370 Daisakyu
- 35371 Yokonozaki
- 35391 Uzan
- 35394 Countbasie
- 35403 Latimer
- 35419 Beckysmethurst
- 35420 Lallemand
- 35427 Chelseawang
- 35429 Bochartdesaron
- 35435 Erikayang
- 35441 Kyoko
- 35444 Giuliamarconcini
- 35446 Stáňa
- 35459 Klaurieger
- 35461 Mazzucato
- 35462 Maramkaire
- 35464 Elisaconsigli
- 35465 Emilianoricci
- 35534 Clementfeller
- 35618 Tartu
- 35621 Lorius
- 35623 Pedrodavid
- 35646 Estela
- 35655 Étienneklein
- 35683 Broumov
- 35703 Lafiascaia
- 35725 Tramuntana
- 35734 Dilithium
- 35768 Wendybauer
- 35769 Tombauer
- 35976 Yorktown
- 35977 Lexington
- 35978 Arlington
- 36033 Viseggi
- 36035 Petrvok
- 36036 Bonucci
- 36037 Linenschmidt
- 36039 Joandunham
- 36060 Babuška
- 36061 Haldane
- 36169 Grosseteste
- 36174 Podolský
- 36177 Tonysharon
- 36182 Montigiani
- 36184 Pavelbožek
- 36187 Travisbarman
- 36213 Robertotisgreen
- 36226 Mackerras
- 36235 Sergebaudo
- 36264 Kojimatsumoto
- 36329 Philmetzger
- 36340 Vaduvescu
- 36352 Erickmeza
- 36424 Satokokumasaki
- 36426 Kakuda
- 36444 Clairblackburn
- 36445 Smalley
- 36446 Cinodapistoia
- 36472 Ebina
- 36614 Saltis
- 36624 Ablerus
- 36672 Sidi
- 36773 Tuttlekeane
- 36774 Kuittinen
- 36782 Okauchitakashige
- 36783 Kagamino
- 36800 Katarinawitt
- 36888 Škrabal
- 36983 Sumner
- 36986 Stickle
- 36992 Jakubek
- 36994 Pugel
- 37019 Jordansteckloff
- 37022 Robertovittori
- 37044 Papymarcel
- 37117 Narcissus
- 37139 Richardmuller
- 37141 Povolný
- 37154 Chuckfeeney
- 37159 Margaretmead
- 37163 Huachucaclub
- 37218 Kimyoonyoung
- 37222 Sansom
- 37223 Devillepoix
- 37250 Juliemitchell
- 37279 Hukvaldy
- 37309 Pajuelo
- 37313 Paolocampaner
- 37349 Lynnaequick
- 37358 Filippromanov
- 37391 Ebre
- 37392 Yukiniall
- 37432 Piszkéstető
- 37452 Spirit
- 37471 Popocatépetl
- 37519 Amphios
- 37529 Ama-Miyayama
- 37530 Dancingangel
- 37556 Svyaztie
- 37561 Churgym
- 37565 Hinoki
- 37573 Enricocaruso
- 37582 Faraday
- 37583 Ramonkhanna
- 37584 Schleiden
- 37586 Isakaayumi
- 37588 Lynnecox
- 37592 Pauljackson
- 37596 Cotahuasi
- 37601 Vicjen
- 37607 Regineolsen
- 37608 Löns
- 37609 LaVelle
- 37623 Valmiera
- 37625 Yonezawatatsuki
- 37626 Meizen
- 37627 Lucaparmitano
- 37630 Thomasmore
- 37640 Luiginegrelli
- 37645 Chebarkul
- 37646 Falconscott
- 37655 Illapa
- 37669 Haragentaro
- 37678 McClure
- 37683 Gustaveeiffel
- 37687 Chunghikoh
- 37692 Loribragg
- 37693 Utofumiaki
- 37699 Santini-Aichl
- 37706 Trinchieri
- 37720 Kawanishi
- 37729 Akiratakao
- 37734 Bonacina
- 37735 Riccardomuti
- 37736 Jandl
- 37749 Umbertobonori
- 37764 Omirika
- 37777 Pérez-Reverte
- 37782 Jacquespiccard
- 37785 Nougaro
- 37786 Tokikonaruko
- 37788 Suchan
- 37818 Juliamaury
- 37835 Darioconsigli
- 37836 Simoneterreni
- 37840 Gramegna
- 37848 Michelmeunier
- 37853 Danielbarbier
- 37859 Bobkoff
- 37865 Georgesattard
- 37939 Hašler
- 37941 Dawidowicz
- 38018 Louisneefs
- 38019 Jeanmariepelt
- 38020 Hannadam
- 38024 Melospadafora
- 38036 Waynewarren
- 38044 Michaellucas
- 38046 Krasnoyarsk
- 38048 Blumenbach
- 38050 Bias
- 38070 Redwine
- 38083 Rhadamanthus
- 38086 Beowulf
- 38203 Sanner
- 38237 Roche
- 38238 Holíč
- 38245 Marcospontes
- 38246 Palupín
- 38250 Tartois
- 38268 Zenkert
- 38269 Gueymard
- 38270 Wettzell
- 38423 Jeokjungchogye
- 38431 Jeffbeck
- 38442 Szilárd
- 38454 Boroson
- 38461 Jiřítrnka
- 38470 Deleflie
- 38540 Stevens
- 38541 Rustichelli
- 38628 Huya
- 38636 Kitazato
- 38639 Samuels
- 38640 Rau
- 38641 Philpott
- 38642 Breukers
- 38643 Scholten
- 38667 de Lignie
- 38669 Michikawa
- 38671 Verdaguer
- 38674 Těšínsko
- 38684 Velehrad
- 38821 Linchinghsia
- 38823 Nijland
- 38827 ter Kuile
- 38828 van ’t Leven
- 38829 Vandeputte
- 38830 Biets
- 38960 Yeungchihung
- 38962 Chuwinghung
- 38966 Deller
- 38967 Roberthaas
- 38976 Taeve
- 38980 Gaoyaojie
- 39137 Wymanwong
- 39167 Opitom
- 39184 Willgrundy
- 39256 Zacny
- 39285 Kipkeino
- 39290 Landsman
- 39300 Auyeungsungfan
- 39314 Moritakumi
- 39332 Lauwaiming
- 39335 Caccin
- 39336 Mariacapria
- 39372 Wongtzewah
- 39382 Opportunity
- 39405 Mosigkau
- 39415 Janeausten
- 39420 Elizabethgaskell
- 39427 Charlottebrontë
- 39428 Emilybrontë
- 39429 Annebrontë
- 39463 Phyleus
- 39464 Pöppelmann
- 39509 Kardashev
- 39516 Lusigny
- 39529 Vatnajökull
- 39536 Lenhof
- 39539 Emmadesmet
- 39540 Borchert
- 39543 Aubriet
- 39549 Casals
- 39557 Gielgud
- 39558 Kishine
- 39564 Tarsia
- 39566 Carllewis
- 39571 Pückler
- 39635 Kusatao
- 39641 Pézy
- 39645 Davelharris
- 39653 Carnera
- 39655 Muneharuasada
- 39677 Anagaribaldi
- 39678 Ammannito
- 39679 Nukuhiyama
- 39686 Takeshihara
- 39699 Ernestocorte
- 39703 Reina
- 39712 Ehimedaigaku
- 39723 Akazawa
- 39726 Hideyukitezuka
- 39734 Marchiori
- 39741 Komm
- 39748 Guccini
- 39791 Jameshesser
- 39792 Patrickchevalley
- 39795 Marson
- 39799 Hadano
- 39802 Ivanhlinka
- 39809 Fukuchan
- 39814 Christianlegrand
- 39849 Giampieri
- 39854 Gabriopiola
- 39860 Aiguoxiang
- 39864 Poggiali
- 39871 Lucagrazzini
- 39875 Matteolombardo
- 39877 Deverchére
- 39880 Dobšinský
- 39882 Edgarmitchell
- 39890 Bobstephens
- 39892 Evaseidlová
- 39930 Kalauch
- 39971 József
- 39991 Iochroma
back to top

== See also ==
- List of minor planet discoverers
- List of observatory codes
- Meanings of minor planet names § Index
