= 970 Primula =

Asteroid

Discovery
- Discovered by: K. Reinmuth
- Discovery site: Heidelberg Obs.
- Discovery date: 29 November 1921

Designations
- Pronunciation: /ˈprɪmjʊlə/
- Named after: Primula (genus of flowers)
- Alternative designations: A921 WK · 1929 RN; 1966 TG · 1921 LB
- Minor planet category: main-belt · (middle) background

Orbital characteristics
- Epoch 31 May 2020 (JD 2459000.5)
- Uncertainty parameter 0
- Observation arc: 98.11 yr (35,834 d)
- Aphelion: 3.2552 AU
- Perihelion: 1.8644 AU
- Semi-major axis: 2.5598 AU
- Eccentricity: 0.2717
- Orbital period (sidereal): 4.10 yr (1,496 d)
- Mean anomaly: 17.501°
- Mean motion: 0° 14^{m} 26.52^{s} / day
- Inclination: 5.0331°
- Longitude of ascending node: 310.77°
- Argument of perihelion: 95.564°

Physical characteristics
- Mean diameter: 9.204±0.289 km
- Synodic rotation period: 2.777±0.001 h
- Geometric albedo: 0.229±0.031
- Spectral type: SMASS = S
- Absolute magnitude (H): 12.3

970 Primula (prov. designation: A921 WK or 1921 LB) is a stony background asteroid from the central regions of the asteroid belt, approximately 9.2 kilometers (5.7 miles) in diameter. It was discovered on 29 November 1921, by astronomer Karl Reinmuth at the Heidelberg Observatory in southern Germany. The S-type asteroid has a short rotation period of 2.8 hours. It was named after the genus of flowering plants, Primula, which are also known as "primroses".

== Orbit and classification ==
Primula is a non-family asteroid of the main belt's background population when applying the hierarchical clustering method to its proper orbital elements. It orbits the Sun in the central asteroid belt at a distance of 1.9–3.3 AU once every 4 years and 1 month (1,496 days; semi-major axis of 2.56 AU). Its orbit has an eccentricity of 0.27 and an inclination of 5° with respect to the ecliptic. The body's observation arc begins with its official discovery observation at Heidelberg observatory in November 1921.

== Naming ==
This minor planet was named after the genus of flowering plants, Primula, also known as "primroses". These perennial herbs belong to the family Primulaceae (primrose family) and have large tufted basal leaves and variously colored flowers. The naming was mentioned in The Names of the Minor Planets by Paul Herget in 1955 (H 93).

== Physical characteristics ==
In the SMASS classification (Bus–Binzel 2000), Primula is a common stony S-type asteroid.

=== Rotation period ===
In November 2003, a rotational lightcurve of Primula was obtained from photometric observations by Pedro Sada, Eder Canizales and Edgar Armada using a remotely controlled commercial telescope at Tenagra Observatories (848). Lightcurve analysis gave a well-defined, short rotation period of 2.777±0.001 hours with a brightness variation of 0.18±0.02 magnitude (U=3). Astronomer Maurice Clark at the Preston Gott Observatory confirmed the period in September 2011, measuring 2.7768±0.0001 hours and a somewhat higher amplitude of 0.30±0.02 (U=3)

=== Diameter and albedo ===
According to the survey carried out by the NEOWISE mission of NASA's Wide-field Infrared Survey Explorer, Primula measures 9.204±0.289 kilometers in diameter and its surface has an albedo of 0.229±0.031. The Collaborative Asteroid Lightcurve Link assumes a standard albedo for a stony asteroid of 0.20 and calculates a diameter of 10.30 kilometers based on an absolute magnitude of 12.3.
