= Keiana Cavé =

American chemical engineer (born 1998)

Personal details
- Born: Keiana Ashli Cavé; April 14, 1998 (age 28) New Orleans, Louisiana, U.S.
- Education: Lusher Charter School
- Profession: Science/Energy/Engineering
- Awards: Intel International Science and Engineering Fair, Forbes 30 Under 30, Glamour Woman of the Year
- Website: Official Website

Keiana Ashli Cavé is an American entrepreneur, scientist and public speaker. She received $1.2 million in research funding from Chevron in 2016, who acquired her company in 2017.

== Early life ==
Cave grew up in New Orleans, Louisiana. She studied at Lusher Charter High School. She returned to her alma mater in 2017 to deliver the commencement speech. Cave did ballet, track, and cheerleading before dropping those programs to pursue research in nanotechnology. Cave attributes her early interest in engineering to the Project Lead the Way (PLTW) Program, for which she later became a national ambassador. In 2014 she won $10,000 in New Orleans Entrepreneur Week's Trust Your Crazy Ideas Challenge hosted by NFL Quarterback Drew Brees.

=== BP Deepwater Horizon Research ===
In 2015 Cave won second place in the Intel International Science and Engineering Fair in the Earth & Environmental Sciences Category with her research on the BP Oil Spill impact. As a result, NASA and MIT Lincoln Laboratory renamed minor planet "2000 GD136" after her.

She began her research at the University of New Orleans at 15, funded by GOMRI (Gulf of Mexico Research Initiative). The research, titled "A Method for Identifying the Photoproducts, Mechanisms, and Toxicity of Petroleum from the Deepwater Horizon by High-Performance Liquid Chromatography and DNPHi Derivatization," provided a method for the U.S. Environmental Protection Agency to identify nanotoxins that form in seawater after oil spills. Cave's method later became a spinoff project in Ecology and Evolutionary Biology conducted at Tulane University in 2016. During this time, Cave traveled with her lab to Gamboa, Panama to conduct research with the Smithsonian Tropical Research Institute.

== Career ==
Cave was a Chemical Engineering student at the University of Michigan in Ann Arbor before dropping out. She was named Student of the Year in 2017.

Cave is a member of the Entrepreneurs Leadership Program and The Kairos Society.

In 2017, Cave delivered talks at TEDx Barcelona. More talks followed at TEDx UofM in 2018.

=== Mare ===
In 2016, Cave completed the Massachusetts Institute of Technology's Global Entrepreneurship Bootcamp and developed an oil spill dispersant molecule, raising US$1.2 million in funding from Chevron for further research. She became the co-founder of Mare, a research initiative dedicated to developing solutions to large-scale problems.

In 2017, Cave was included on the Forbes 30 Under 30 list and Magic Johnson's 32 Under 32 list.

In 2018, Cave was named one of Glamour Magazine's 2018 College Women of the Year.

Cave was named to Entrepreneur Magazine's 2018 Young Millionaires List, following the acquisition of Mare in late 2017.

=== Sublima ===
In 2019, Cave founded Sublima Pharmaceuticals in an effort to develop the first non-hormonal birth control in the United States. She made this decision after having some side effects from her previous birth control pill. After three to four doctors and a span of six months, they figured out that the hormonal birth control was the problem. Sublima is still in early stages. Cave is expecting the fundraise after the drug gets approved by the FDA. The drug is currently in Phase Three of clinical trials.

=== Diversity and inclusion campaigns ===
Cave's ethnic origins have been the subject of debate. She has been featured in Diversity Campaigns by MTV, ABC's Good Morning America, SXSW, 100 Top Women in the World List, The Why Culture, and The Color of STEM.

== Published works ==
- A Method for Identifying the Photoproducts, Mechanisms, and Toxicity of Petroleum from the Deepwater Horizon by High-Performance Liquid Chromatography, DNPHi Derivatization, and Solar Simulation
