= Meanings of minor-planet names: 31001–32000 =

As minor planet discoveries are confirmed, they are given a permanent number by the IAU's Minor Planet Center (MPC), and the discoverers can then submit names for them, following the IAU's naming conventions. The list below concerns those minor planets in the specified number-range that have received names, and explains the meanings of those names.

Official naming citations of newly named small Solar System bodies are approved and published in a bulletin by IAU's Working Group for Small Bodies Nomenclature (WGSBN). Before May 2021, citations were published in MPC's Minor Planet Circulars for many decades. Recent citations can also be found on the JPL Small-Body Database (SBDB). Until his death in 2016, German astronomer Lutz D. Schmadel compiled these citations into the Dictionary of Minor Planet Names (DMP) and regularly updated the collection.

Based on Paul Herget's The Names of the Minor Planets, Schmadel also researched the unclear origin of numerous asteroids, most of which had been named prior to World War II. This article incorporates text from this source, which is in the public domain: SBDB New namings may only be added to this list below after official publication as the preannouncement of names is condemned. The WGSBN publishes a comprehensive guideline for the naming rules of non-cometary small Solar System bodies.

== 31001–31100 ==
Named minor planet	Provisional	This minor planet was named for...	Ref; Catalog
31006 Katherine	1995 XC	Katherine Blundell, English astrophysicist	IAU · 31006
31012 Jiangshiyang	1996 CG_{8}	Jiang Shiyang (born 1936) has made significant contributions to studies of pulsating variable stars and developments of astronomical instruments in China. He shared two National Science and Technology Progress Awards of China for participating in building the Xinglong telescopes, coude and radial velocity spectrometers.	JPL · 31012
31015 Boccardi	1996 DS_{1}	Giovanni Boccardi, director of the Turin Observatory from 1900 until 1923	JPL · 31015
31020 Skarupa	1996 FP_{1}	Valerie Skarupa, American AMOS program manager	JPL · 31020
31028 Cerulli	1996 HH_{1}	Vincenzo Cerulli, Italian astronomer	JPL · 31028
31031 Altiplano	1996 HV_{20}	The Altiplano in the central Andes lies mostly within Bolivia and Peru, and hosts the cities of Puno, Potosi, Cuzco and La Paz.	MPC · 31031
31032 Scheidemann	1996 HS_{22}	Heinrich Scheidemann (c. 1595–1663), a composer	JPL · 31032
31037 Mydon	1996 HZ_{25}	Mydon, a Paeonian charioteer fighting for the Trojans, was killed by Achilles near the Skamander river.	JPL · 31037
31043 Sturm	1996 LT	Charles-François Sturm, 19th-century Swiss-French mathematician	JPL · 31043
31061 Tamao	1996 TK_{7}	Tamao Nakamura, Japanese actress	JPL · 31061
31065 Beishizhang	1996 TZ_{13}	Shi-Zhang Bei, Chinese biophysicist, member of the Chinese Academy of Sciences, on the occasion of his 100th birthday	JPL · 31065
31086 Gehringer	1997 AT_{17}	Tom Gehringer, American teacher †	MPC · 31086
31087 Oirase	1997 AA_{22}	Oirase, the name of a gorge which runs through Towada, a city in Aomori Prefecture.	JPL · 31087
31091 Bettiventicinque	1997 BE_{9}	Elisabetta Venticinque (born 1973) has been an amateur astronomer at the Gruppo Astrofili Montelupo since 2020.	IAU · 31091
31092 Carolowilhelmina	1997 CW_{5}	Carolowilhelmina is named in honor of the Dukes Karl and Wilhelm of Braunschweig. In 1745 they founded the alma mater of Carl-Friedrich Gauss, the Collegium Carolinum, nowadays known as the Technische Universität Braunschweig.	JPL · 31092
31095 Buneiou	1997 DH	King Muryeong, known in Japanese as Buneiou, (462–523) was the 25th king of Baekje, an ancient kingdom located in the southwest of the Korean peninsula.	JPL · 31095
31097 Nucciomula	1997 JM_{11}	Alfonso Mula (born 1956), Italian art critic, poet and writer, founder of the Empedocles International Academy of Culture and Philosophical Investigation, recipient of the 1994 Premio Telemone for literature	JPL · 31097
31098 Frankhill	1997 LQ_{2}	Frank Hill, American astronomer and heliosismologist	JPL · 31098

== 31101–31200 ==
back to top

Named minor planet	Provisional	This minor planet was named for...	Ref; Catalog
31103 Elenagarcía	1997 OE_{2}	Elena García Armada, Spanish roboticist and CSIC researcher.	IAU · 31103
31104 Annanetrebko	1997 OK_{2}	Anna Netrebko (born 1971) is an Austrian soprano of Russian origin. She has an ample and powerful voice, allowing her to play a broad repertoire going from the Italian operas, to Mozart to the Wagnerian operas.	JPL · 31104
31105 Oguniyamagata	1997 OW_{2}	Oguni, town which is situated in the southwestern part of Yamagata prefecture Japan	JPL · 31105
31109 Janpalouš	1997 PL_{4}	Jan Palouš, Czech astronomer at the Astronomický Ústav (Astronomical Institute) of the Akademie věd České republiky (Czech Academy of Sciences), instrumental in negotiating the entry of the Czech Republic into the European Southern Observatory	JPL · 31109
31110 Clapas	1997 PN_{4}	Clapàs, an occitan word meaning « pile of rock debris », now the nickname of the Montpellier area of France	JPL · 31110
31113 Stull	1997 QC	John Stull, American telescope maker, builder of the observatory at Alfred University	JPL · 31113
31122 Brooktaylor	1997 SD	Brook Taylor, 17th–18th-century British mathematician.	JPL · 31122
31124 Slavíček	1997 SJ_{1}	Karel Slavíček, Jesuit missionary and scientist was the first Czech sinologist.	JPL · 31124
31129 Langyatai	1997 SR_{10}	Langyatai, a three-story platform with a perimeter of several kilometers, was built along the Langya Mountain and beside the Yellow Sea with rammed earth more than 2,200 years ago.	JPL · 31129
31134 Zurria	1997 SF_{18}	Giuseppe Zurria, professor of mathematics at the University of Catania	JPL · 31134
31139 Garnavich	1997 SJ_{34}	Peter M. Garnavich, American observational astrophysicist and associate professor at the University of Notre Dame, Indiana	JPL · 31139
31147 Miriquidi	1997 UA_{4}	A synonym for the Ore Mountains, a 10th-century Old Saxon word meaning "an impenetrable great dark forest"	JPL · 31147
31151 Sajichugaku	1997 UM_{21}	Saji chugaku is a junior high school in Saji with an astronomical observatory.	JPL · 31151
31152 Daishinsai	1997 UV_{21}	The Great East Japan earthquake (Higashi nihon daishinsai; Tōhoku earthquake and tsunami) caused widespread destruction in eastern Japan and killed about 20000 people in March 2011.	JPL · 31152
31153 Enricaparri	1997 UP_{22}	Enrichetta Parri (born 1935) is a mathematician who graduated the University in Florence in 1965. She is the wife of the first discoverer.	JPL · 31153
31174 Rozelot	1997 XW_{4}	Jean Pierre Rozelot (born 1942) is a solar astronomer who has worked at Pic du Midi Observatory and at CERGA, which he directed between 1982 and 1988. He has been active in the teaching of astronomy but also the popularization of astronomy through the support to various societies and astronomy clubs in the southeast of France.	JPL · 31174
31175 Erikafuchs	1997 XV_{7}	Erika Fuchs (1906–2005), a translator of Disney stories	JPL · 31175
31179 Gongju	1997 YR_{2}	Gongju, a city located in South Chungcheong province of Korea	JPL · 31179
31189 Tricomi	1997 YZ_{7}	Francesco Giacomo Tricomi, 20th-century Italian mathematician	JPL · 31189
31190 Toussaint	1997 YB_{12}	Roberta Marie Toussaint, American experimental physicist	JPL · 31190
31192 Aigoual	1997 YH_{16}	Mont Aigoual, highest (1567 m) mountain of the Cévennes of southern France	JPL · 31192
31196 Yulong	1997 YL_{18}	Yulong (meaning jade dragon) is the only Naxi language autonomous county in China	JPL · 31196

== 31201–31300 ==
back to top

Named minor planet	Provisional	This minor planet was named for...	Ref; Catalog
31201 Michellegrand	1998 AT_{5}	Michel Legrand (1932–2019) was a prolific French musical composer, arranger, conductor and jazz pianist. He composed the music of many well-known movies such as The Umbrellas of Cherbourg and The Young Girls of Rochefort. He won three Oscars and many other awards worldwide.	JPL · 31201
31203 Hersman	1998 AO_{9}	Chris Becker Hersman, American spacecraft systems engineer for the New Horizons Pluto Kuiper Belt mission	JPL · 31203
31230 Tuyouyou	1998 BB_{47}	Tu Youyouŋ (born 1930), a Chinese pharmacologist and Nobel Laureate.	JPL · 31230
31231 Uthmann	1998 CA	Barbara Uthmann, 16th-century German businesswoman, said to have introduced the art of lace-making in the Ore Mountains of Saxony	JPL · 31231
31232 Slavonice	1998 CF	Slavonice, Czech Republic	JPL · 31232
31234 Bea	1998 CL_{1}	Beata Tomsza (born 1971) is a Polish nurse, a medical rescuer, and also a teacher at medical schools in Sosnowiec and Tychy. Bea has been a pen pal of the first discoverer for years	JPL · 31234
31238 Kroměříž	1998 DT_{1}	Kroměříž, Czech Republic, whose gardens and castle are a UNESCO World Heritage Site †	MPC · 31238
31239 Michaeljames	1998 DV_{1}	Michael James, American high-school teacher of English	JPL · 31239
31240 Katrianne	1998 DB_{2}	Katrin Susanne Lehmann, German teacher of physics and astronomy, and wife of the discoverer	JPL · 31240
31244 Guidomonzino	1998 DG_{11}	Guido Monzino (1928–1988), an Italian explorer.	IAU · 31244
31249 Renéefleming	1998 DF_{14}	Renée Fleming (born 1959) is a well-known American lyrical soprano who has marked the scene with her roles in classical operas by Richard Strauss, Mozart, Handel, Verdi and Dvorak, as well as more modern pieces, such as \"le temps l´horloge\" by Henri Dutilleux. Name suggested by Natalie Dessay.	JPL · 31249
31254 Totucciogrisanti	1998 DK_{23}	Salvatore (‘Totuccio’) Grisanti (1947–2020), an Italian professor of literature and philosophy	IAU · 31254
31266 Tournefort	1998 EZ_{13}	Joseph Pitton de Tournefort (1656–1708), French botanist	JPL · 31266
31267 Kuldiga	1998 ES_{14}	Kuldīga, Latvia	JPL · 31267
31268 Welty	1998 FA	Sandra Welty, American high-school teacher of English	JPL · 31268
31271 Nallino	1998 FH_{16}	Carlo Alfonso Nallino (1872–1938), Italian orientalist	JPL · 31271
31272 Makosinski	1998 FE_{18}	Ann Stasia Makosinski (born 1997) was awarded second place in the 2014 Intel International Science and Engineering Fair for her electrical and mechanical engineering project.	JPL · 31272
31276 Calvinrieder	1998 FG_{28}	Calvin James Rieder (born 1997) was awarded second place in the 2014 Intel International Science and Engineering Fair for his environmental management project. JPL	MPC · 31276
31281 Stothers	1998 FK_{34}	Duncan Bayard Stothers (born 1997) was awarded first place in the 2014 Intel International Science and Engineering Fair for his electrical and mechanical engineering project.	JPL · 31281
31282 Nicoleticea	1998 FD_{35}	Nicole Sabina Ticea (born 1998) was awarded second place in the 2014 Intel International Science and Engineering Fair for her medicine and health sciences project.	JPL · 31282
31283 Wanruomeng	1998 FD_{40}	Wan Ruomeng (born 1996) was awarded first place in the 2014 Intel International Science and Engineering Fair for her plant sciences project.	JPL · 31283
31291 Yaoyue	1998 FH_{64}	Yao Yue (born 1997) was awarded best of category and first place in the 2014 Intel International Science and Engineering Fair for his computer science project, and also received the European Union Contest for Young Scientists Award.	JPL · 31291
31296 Matthewclement	1998 FY_{73}	Matthew Scott Clement (b. 1988), an American planetary scientist.	IAU · 31296
31298 Chantaihei	1998 FB_{77}	Chan Tai Hei (born 1996) was awarded best of category and first place in the 2014 Intel International Science and Engineering Fair for his chemistry team project, and also received the Philip V. Streich Memorial Award.	JPL · 31298

== 31301–31400 ==
back to top

Named minor planet	Provisional	This minor planet was named for...	Ref; Catalog
31312 Fangerhai	1998 FY_{118}	Fang Er Hai (born 1996) was awarded best of category and first place in the 2014 Intel International Science and Engineering Fair for his chemistry team project, and also received the Philip V. Streich Memorial Award.	JPL · 31312
31313 Kanwingyi	1998 FO_{119}	Kan Wing Yi (born 1998) was awarded second place in the 2014 Intel International Science and Engineering Fair for her environmental management project.	JPL · 31313
31319 Vespucci	1998 HD_{2}	Amerigo Vespucci (1454–1512), an Italian explorer, navigator and cartographer. In 1507 the geographer Martin Waldseemüller published the first paper of the Mundus Novus associating the name America with Amerigo Vespucci	JPL · 31319
31323 Lysá hora	1998 HC_{29}	Lysá hora, highest (1323 m) mountain of the Beskids (Beskydy) mountain range, the Czech Republic	JPL · 31323
31324 Jiřímrázek	1998 HR_{31}	Jiří Mrázek, 20th-century Czech geophysicist, TV and radio popularizer of astronautics, astronomy, computer science and related subjects	JPL · 31324
31336 Chenyuhsin	1998 HT_{129}	Chen Yu-Hsin (born 1996) was awarded best of category and first place in the 2014 Intel International Science and Engineering Fair for her earth science project, and also received the European Union Contest for Young Scientists Award.	JPL · 31336
31338 Lipperhey	1998 HX_{147}	Hans Lipperhey (1570–1619), Dutch lensmaker, inventor of Dutch perspective glass, and first to design and seek a patent for a practical telescope	JPL · 31338
31344 Agathon	1998 OM_{12}	Agathon, son of Priam and prince of Troy, is mentioned in Homer's Iliad as being one of the last surviving princes during the Trojan War.	JPL · 31344
31349 Uria-Monzon	1998 SV	Béatrice Uria-Monzon (1963–2025) was a French mezzo-soprano. She studied music and singing at the University of Bordeaux and at the lyric art school of the Paris opera. She has a broad repertoire but is noted for her many interpretations of the role of Carmen.	JPL · 31349
31358 Garethcollins	1998 UR_{23}	Gareth Collins (born 1977), a British professor at Imperial College, London.	IAU · 31358
31360 Huangyihsuan	1998 VV_{14}	Huang Yi-Hsuan (born 1996) was awarded best of category and first place in the 2014 Intel International Science and Engineering Fair for his plant sciences project, and also received the Dudley R. Herschbach SIYSS Award.	JPL · 31360
31363 Shulga	1998 VS_{44}	Valery Mikhailovich Shulga, Ukrainian radio astronomer	JPL · 31363
31374 Hruskova	1998 XZ_{41}	Aranka Hruskova (born 1995) was awarded second place in the 2014 Intel International Science and Engineering Fair for her mathematical sciences project.	JPL · 31374
31375 Krystufek	1998 XP_{46}	Robin Krystufek (born 1995) was awarded second place in the 2014 Intel International Science and Engineering Fair for his biochemistry project.	JPL · 31375
31376 Leobauersfeld	1998 XB_{48}	Leonard Bauersfeld (born 1997) was awarded second place in the 2014 Intel International Science and Engineering Fair for his physics and astronomy team project.	JPL · 31376
31377 Kleinwort	1998 XG_{50}	Lennart Julian Kleinwort (born 1998) was awarded best of category and first place in the 2014 Intel International Science and Engineering Fair for his mathematical sciences project, and also received the Intel Foundation Young Scientist Award.	JPL · 31377
31378 Neidinger	1998 XZ_{50}	Leonard Bauersfeld (born 1997) was awarded second place in the 2014 Intel International Science and Engineering Fair for his physics and astronomy team project.	JPL · 31378
31380 Hegyesi	1998 XA_{73}	Hegyesi Donat Sandor (born 1995) was awarded second place in the 2014 Intel International Science and Engineering Fair for his electrical and mechanical engineering project.	JPL · 31380
31384 Joséloisestévez	1998 XE_{96}	José Lois Estévez, Spanish Professor of Epistemology at the University of Santiago de Compostela, as well as a poet and astronomer.	IAU · 31384
31385 Genovevavázquez	1998 XF_{96}	Genoveva Vázquez Calviño, a self-taught Spanish midwife from Bande (Ourense), known as A Partureira de Xinzo.	IAU · 31385
31387 Lehoucq	1998 YA_{2}	Roland Lehoucq (born 1965) is a French astrophysicist, working on cosmic topology. He is also very active in public outreach and is well known for his books on science fiction novels and movies such as Making Science with StarWars. Since 2012, he has been the president of the annual sci-fi convention "les Utopiales".	JPL · 31387
31389 Alexkaplan	1998 YN_{2}	Alexandre Kaplan (1901–1973) was an electrical engineer, with a passion for astronautics and astronomy. A member of the groupe de Lorraine of the Societe Astronomique de France, he built an observatory for the use of astronomy clubs around the city of Nancy.	JPL · 31389
31398 Lukedaly	1998 YU_{29}	Luke Daly (b. 1990), a British scientist at the University of Glasgow.	IAU · 31398
31399 Susorney	1998 YF_{30}	Hannah Susorney (born 1991) is a former postdoctoral researcher at the University of British Columbia and a Marie Sklodowska-Curie Fellow at the University of Bristol. She studies topography of asteroids and the role of impact cratering on the surface evolution of planetary bodies.	IAU · 31399
31400 Dakshdua	1998 YY_{31}	Daksh Dua (born 1997) was awarded best of category and first place in the 2014 Intel International Science and Engineering Fair for his animal sciences team project, and also received the Intel Foundation Cultural and Scientific Visit to China Award.	JPL · 31400

== 31401–31500 ==
back to top

Named minor planet	Provisional	This minor planet was named for...	Ref; Catalog
31402 Negishi	1999 AR	Hiroyuki Negishi (born 1964), a Japanese amateur astronomer.	JPL · 31402
31412 Andersonribeiro	1999 AP_{20}	Anderson de Oliveira Ribeiro (b. 1979), a Brazilian astronomer.	IAU · 31412
31414 Rotarysusa	1999 AV_{22}	Rotary Club, Val Susa, Italy †	MPC · 31414
31415 Fenucci	1999 AK_{23}	Marco Fenucci (b. 1992), an Italian researcher at ESA's NEO Coordination Centre at the European Space Research Institute (Italy).	IAU · 31415
31416 Peteworden	1999 AX_{24}	Pete Worden (born 1949), director of NASA's Ames Research Center. He was influential in many projects like the Clementine space mission, and indirectly in programs like ODAS, which allowed this asteroid to be discovered. An innovator and space enthusiast, he is a man of vision	JPL · 31416
31418 Sosaoyarzabal	1999 AJ_{34}	Andrea Sosa Oyarzabal (born 1968) is a professor of the Centro Universitario Regional del Este at the Universidad de la Republica de Uruguay. She specializes in the study of the dynamical and physical properties of the minor bodies of the Solar System.	IAU · 31418
31419 Shafransky	1999 AN_{37}	Benjamin Solomon Shafransky, American telescope operator for the Lowell Discovery Telescope at Lowell Observatory.	IAU · 31419
31426 Davidlouapre	1999 BA_{5}	David Louapre (born 1978) is a French physicist whose thesis was on loop quantum gravity. Now working in industry, he is a very well-known French scientific YouTuber.	JPL · 31426
31429 Diegoazzaro	1999 BL_{7}	Diego Azzaro (1925–2014) was an Italian amateur astronomer. A popularizer of astronomy, he was president of the association ASTRIS and Astronomical Observatory of Cervara di Roma.	JPL · 31429
31431 Cabibbo	1999 BP_{9}	Nicola Cabibbo, Italian physicist	JPL · 31431
31435 Benhauck	1999 BH_{14}	Ben Hauck (born 1978) has been an amateur astronomer for most of his life and is heavily involved in astronomy education and outreach. He is a passionate activist in the fight against climate change.	JPL · 31435
31437 Verma	1999 BT_{19}	Abhishek Verma (born 1999) was awarded best of category and first place in the 2014 Intel International Science and Engineering Fair for his animal sciences team project.	JPL · 31437
31438 Yasuhitohayashi	1999 BV_{19}	Yasuhito Hayashi (born 1996) was awarded second place in the 2014 Intel International Science and Engineering Fair for his animal sciences project.	JPL · 31438
31439 Mieyamanaka	1999 BQ_{23}	Mie Yamanaka (born 1996) was awarded second place in the 2014 Intel International Science and Engineering Fair for her energy and transportation project	JPL · 31439
31442 Stark	1999 CY_{1}	Lawrence W. Stark, American professor emeritus of physiological optics and engineering	JPL · 31442
31450 Stevepreston	1999 CU_{9}	US occultation observer and skilled mathematician, Steve Preston (born 1956), introduced asteroidal predictions of unprecedented accuracy in 2001, significantly increasing observation rates worldwide. He was elected president of the International Occultation Timing Association in 2014.	JPL · 31450
31451 Joenickell	1999 CE_{10}	Joe Nickell, the senior research fellow of the Committee for Skeptical Inquiry	JPL · 31451
31453 Arnaudthiry	1999 CY_{12}	Arnaud Thiry (born 1988), a French photographer and science popularizer, mainly known for his YouTube channel "Astronogeek" (in French). His channel features videos debunking false science and UFO-related stories.	JPL · 31453
31458 Delrosso	1999 CG_{16}	Renzo Del Rosso (born 1957), an Italian amateur astronomer, astrophotographer, lecturer and writer of astronomical software	JPL · 31458
31460 Jongsowfei	1999 CV_{19}	Faye Jong-Sow Fei (born 1998) was awarded best of category and first place in the 2014 Intel International Science and Engineering Fair for her environmental management project, and also received the European Union Contest for Young Scientists Award.	JPL · 31460
31461 Shannonlee	1999 CK_{20}	Shannon Xinjing Lee (born 1996) was awarded best of category and first place in the 2014 Intel International Science and Engineering Fair for her energy and transportation project.	JPL · 31461
31462 Brchnelova	1999 CW_{22}	Michaela Brchnelova (born 1996) was awarded first place in the 2014 Intel International Science and Engineering Fair for her physics and astronomy project.	JPL · 31462
31463 Michalgeci	1999 CC_{24}	Michal Geci (born 1995) was awarded second place in the 2014 Intel International Science and Engineering Fair for his physics and astronomy team project	JPL · 31463
31464 Liscinsky	1999 CM_{25}	Martin Liscinsky (born 1995) was awarded second place in the 2014 Intel International Science and Engineering Fair for his physics and astronomy team project.	JPL · 31464
31465 Piyasiri	1999 CS_{26}	Namal Udara Piyasiri (born 1996) was awarded second place in the 2014 Intel International Science and Engineering Fair for his electrical and mechanical engineering project.	JPL · 31465
31466 Abualhassan	1999 CU_{26}	Hayat Abdulredha Abu Alhassan (born 1997) was awarded second place in the 2014 Intel International Science and Engineering Fair for her environmental sciences team project.	JPL · 31466
31468 Albastaki	1999 CE_{31}	Hayat Abdulredha Abu Alhassan (born 1997) was awarded second place in the 2014 Intel International Science and Engineering Fair for her environmental sciences team project.	JPL · 31468
31469 Aizawa	1999 CO_{31}	Ken Aizawa (born 1996) was awarded best of category and first place in the 2014 Intel International Science and Engineering Fair for his biochemistry project.	JPL · 31469
31470 Alagappan	1999 CR_{33}	Perry Alagappan (born 1997) was awarded best of category and first place in the 2014 Intel International Science and Engineering Fair for his environmental sciences project.	JPL · 31470
31471 Sallyalbright	1999 CJ_{36}	Sally Albright (born 1999) was awarded first place in the 2014 Intel International Science and Engineering Fair for her environmental management team project.	JPL · 31471
31473 Guangning	1999 CD_{37}	Guangning An (born 1996) was awarded second place in the 2014 Intel International Science and Engineering Fair for his biochemistry project.	JPL · 31473
31474 Advaithanand	1999 CL_{37}	Advaith Anand (born 1997) was awarded second place in the 2014 Intel International Science and Engineering Fair for his materials and bioengineering project.	JPL · 31474
31475 Robbacchus	1999 CH_{42}	Robert M. Bacchus (born 1996) was awarded second place in the 2014 Intel International Science and Engineering Fair for his medicine and health sciences project.	JPL · 31475
31476 Bocconcelli	1999 CK_{43}	Carlo Bocconcelli (born 1996) was awarded second place in the 2014 Intel International Science and Engineering Fair for his cellular and molecular biology project.	JPL · 31476
31477 Meenakshi	1999 CO_{43}	Meenakshi Bose (born 1997) was awarded second place in the 2014 Intel International Science and Engineering Fair for her medicine and health sciences project.	JPL · 31477
31479 Botello	1999 CD_{47}	Christopher Rafael Botello (born 1998) was awarded second place in the 2014 Intel International Science and Engineering Fair for his energy and transportation project.	JPL · 31479
31480 Jonahbutler	1999 CN_{47}	Jonah Zachariah Butler (born 1997) was awarded second place in the 2014 Intel International Science and Engineering Fair for his energy and transportation project.	JPL · 31480
31482 Caddell	1999 CK_{48}	John Chapman Alexander Caddell (born 1998) was awarded best of category and first place in the 2014 Intel International Science and Engineering Fair for his physics and astronomy project.	JPL · 31482
31483 Caulfield	1999 CR_{48}	Sarayu Caulfield (born 1997) was awarded second place in the 2014 Intel International Science and Engineering Fair for her behavioral and social sciences team project.	JPL · 31483
31487 Parthchopra	1999 CH_{53}	Parth Chopra (born 1996) was awarded second place in the 2014 Intel International Science and Engineering Fair for his computer science project.	JPL · 31487
31489 Matthewchun	1999 CN_{53}	Matthew Leong Chun (born 1996) was awarded second place in the 2014 Intel International Science and Engineering Fair for his chemistry project	JPL · 31489
31490 Swapnavdeka	1999 CB_{55}	Swapnav Deka (born 1997) was awarded second place in the 2014 Intel International Science and Engineering Fair for his microbiology project.	JPL · 31490
31491 Demessie	1999 CF_{57}	Bluye DeMessie (born 1997) was awarded second place in the 2014 Intel International Science and Engineering Fair for his environmental management project.	JPL · 31491
31492 Jennarose	1999 CV_{57}	Jenna Rose DiRito (born 1996) was awarded second place in the 2014 Intel International Science and Engineering Fair for her medicine and health sciences team project.	JPL · 31492
31493 Fernando-Peiris	1999 CS_{58}	Achal James Fernando-Peiris (born 1997) was awarded first place in the 2014 Intel International Science and Engineering Fair for his physics and astronomy project. He also received the Innovation Exploration Award.	JPL · 31493
31494 Emmafreedman	1999 CP_{60}	Emma R. Freedman (born 1999) was awarded second place in the 2014 Intel International Science and Engineering Fair for her environmental management project.	JPL · 31494
31495 Sarahgalvin	1999 CR_{60}	Sarah Nicole Galvin (born 1996) was awarded best of category and first place in the 2014 Intel International Science and Engineering Fair for her electrical and mechanical engineering project.	JPL · 31495
31496 Glowacz	1999 CU_{60}	Julian Stefan Glowacz (born 1998) was awarded second place in the 2014 Intel International Science and Engineering Fair for his plant sciences team project.	JPL · 31496
31500 Grutzik	1999 CK_{66}	Petra Luna Grutzik (born 1996) was awarded second place in the 2014 Intel International Science and Engineering Fair for her behavioral and social sciences project.	JPL · 31500

== 31501–31600 ==
back to top

Named minor planet	Provisional	This minor planet was named for...	Ref; Catalog
31501 Williamhang	1999 CJ_{68}	William C. Hang (born 1997) was awarded second place in the 2014 Intel International Science and Engineering Fair for his computer science project.	JPL · 31501
31502 Hellerstein	1999 CQ_{68}	Joshua Kopel Hellerstein (born 1996) was awarded first place in the 2014 Intel International Science and Engineering Fair for his electrical and mechanical engineering project.	JPL · 31502
31503 Jessicahong	1999 CH_{72}	Jessica Hong (born 1997) was awarded second place in the 2014 Intel International Science and Engineering Fair for her chemistry team project.	JPL · 31503
31504 Jaisonjain	1999 CF_{73}	Jaison Jain (born 1998) was awarded second place in the 2014 Intel International Science and Engineering Fair for his plant sciences team project.	JPL · 31504
31507 Williamjin	1999 CX_{81}	William Huang Jin (born 1995) was awarded second place in the 2014 Intel International Science and Engineering Fair for his microbiology project.	JPL · 31507
31508 Kanevsky	1999 CK_{84}	Ariel Benjamin Kanevsky (born 1997) was awarded first place in the 2014 Intel International Science and Engineering Fair for his computer science project.	JPL · 31508
31510 Saumya	1999 CQ_{85}	Ariel Benjamin Kanevsky (born 1997) was awarded first place in the 2014 Intel International Science and Engineering Fair for his computer science project.	JPL · 31510
31511 Jessicakim	1999 CL_{87}	Jessica Kim (born 1997) was awarded first place in the 2014 Intel International Science and Engineering Fair for her energy and transportation team project.	JPL · 31511
31512 Koyyalagunta	1999 CF_{91}	Divya Koyyalagunta (born 1995) was awarded first place in the 2014 Intel International Science and Engineering Fair for her behavioral and social sciences project.	JPL · 31512
31513 Lafazan	1999 CV_{92}	Justin Chase Lafazan (born 1996) was awarded second place in the 2014 Intel International Science and Engineering Fair for his behavioral and social sciences project.	JPL · 31513
31516 Leibowitz	1999 CX_{101}	Michal Leibowitz (born 1996) was awarded second place in the 2014 Intel International Science and Engineering Fair for her environmental management team project.	JPL · 31516
31517 Mahoui	1999 CW_{102}	Iman Mahoui (born 1998) was awarded second place in the 2014 Intel International Science and Engineering Fair for her cellular and molecular biology project.	JPL · 31517
31519 Mimamarquez	1999 CS_{103}	Michelle Marie Marquez (born 1999) was awarded best of category and first place in the 2014 Intel International Science and Engineering Fair for her behavioral and social sciences project.	JPL · 31519
31522 McCutchen	1999 CE_{109}	Jonathan James McCutchen (born 1999) was awarded first place in the 2014 Intel International Science and Engineering Fair for his environmental sciences project.	JPL · 31522
31523 Jessemichel	1999 CZ_{110}	Jesse Martin Michel (born 1997) was awarded second place in the 2014 Intel International Science and Engineering Fair for his mathematical sciences project.	JPL · 31523
31525 Nickmiller	1999 CO_{116}	Nicholas Paul Miller (born 1996) was awarded second place in the 2014 Intel International Science and Engineering Fair for his microbiology project.	JPL · 31525
31531 ARRL	1999 CQ_{137}	American Radio Relay League, the largest membership organization of radio amateurs in the United States	JPL · 31531
31550 Beckmaier	1999 DT_{7}	Beck Maier, American telescope operator for the Lowell Discovery Telescope at Lowell Observatory.	IAU · 31550
31551 Ashleyking	1999 DV_{7}	Ashley King (b. 1985), a British research scientist.	IAU · 31551
31555 Wheeler	1999 EV_{2}	John Archibald Wheeler, American theoretical physicist	JPL · 31555
31556 Shatner	1999 EP_{5}	William Shatner (born 1931), a Canadian actor.	JPL · 31556
31557 Holleybakich	1999 EX_{5}	Holley Bakich (born 1969) is an artist who has created graphics for astronomy books, websites, and magazine articles. She also pencils, inks, and colors the popular web comic Outer Space Pals. She has earned degrees in Fine Art and Interior Design and incorporates astronomical subjects in her work whenever possible.	JPL · 31557
31559 Alonmillet	1999 ED_{12}	Alon Millet (born 1998) was awarded second place in the 2014 Intel International Science and Engineering Fair for his plant sciences project.	JPL · 31559
31563 Bourdelledemicas	1999 FW_{8}	Jules Bourdelle de Micas (b. 1994), a French postdoctoral researcher at the Observatoire de Paris (France).	IAU · 31563
31569 Adriansonka	1999 FL_{18}	Adrian Sonka (born 1977) is a Romanian astronomer at the Astronomical Institute (Bucharest) whose research contributions include astrometry and photometry of near-Earth objects, with dedication toward communicating astronomy to the public in Romania.	IAU · 31569
31570 Conjat	1999 FG_{19}	Matthieu Conjat (b. 1976), a French amateur astronomer.	IAU · 31570
31573 Mohanty	1999 FS_{23}	Ahneesh Jayant Mohanty (born 1997) was awarded second place in the 2014 Intel International Science and Engineering Fair for his medicine and health sciences project.	JPL · 31573
31574 Moshova	1999 FB_{25}	Andrew Moshova (born 1997) was awarded first place in the 2014 Intel International Science and Engineering Fair for his energy and transportation team project.	JPL · 31574
31575 Nikhilmurthy	1999 FA_{26}	Nikhil Murthy (born 1999) was awarded second place in the 2014 Intel International Science and Engineering Fair for his chemistry project.	JPL · 31575
31576 Nandigala	1999 FF_{26}	Vipul Nandigala (born 1997) was awarded second place in the 2014 Intel International Science and Engineering Fair for his physics and astronomy project.	JPL · 31576
31580 Bridgetoei	1999 FH_{30}	Bridget Ann Oei (born 1995) was awarded second place in the 2014 Intel International Science and Engineering Fair for her environmental sciences project.	JPL · 31580
31581 Onnink	1999 FL_{30}	Carly Onnink (born 1998) was awarded second place in the 2014 Intel International Science and Engineering Fair for her animal sciences team project.	JPL · 31581
31582 Miraeparker	1999 FO_{30}	Mirae Leigh Parker (born 1995) was awarded second place in the 2014 Intel International Science and Engineering Fair for her electrical and mechanical engineering team project.	JPL · 31582
31584 Emaparker	1999 FG_{31}	Ema Linnea Parker (born 1998) was awarded second place in the 2014 Intel International Science and Engineering Fair for her electrical and mechanical engineering team project.	JPL · 31584
31588 Harrypaul	1999 FT_{33}	Harry Paul (born 1996) was awarded best of category and first place in the 2014 Intel International Science and Engineering Fair for his materials and bioengineering project.	JPL · 31588
31592 Jacobplaut	1999 FG_{36}	Jacob Mitchell Plaut (born 1996) was awarded second place in the 2014 Intel International Science and Engineering Fair for his environmental management team project.	JPL · 31592
31593 Romapradhan	1999 FG_{39}	Roma Vivek Pradhan (born 1996) was awarded second place in the 2014 Intel International Science and Engineering Fair for her computer science project.	JPL · 31593
31594 Drewprevost	1999 FH_{41}	Drew Prevost (born 1998) was awarded second place in the 2014 Intel International Science and Engineering Fair for his electrical and mechanical engineering project.	JPL · 31594
31595 Noahpritt	1999 FS_{45}	Noah Christian Pritt (born 1996) was awarded second place in the 2014 Intel International Science and Engineering Fair for his computer science project.	JPL · 31595
31596 Ragavender	1999 FL_{46}	Ritesh Narayan Ragavender (born 1996) was awarded first place in the 2014 Intel International Science and Engineering Fair for his mathematical sciences project	JPL · 31596
31597 Allisonmarie	1999 FP_{47}	Allison Marie Raines (born 1998) was awarded first place in the 2014 Intel International Science and Engineering Fair for her environmental management team project.	JPL · 31597
31598 Danielrudin	1999 FQ_{48}	Daniel Rudin (born 1996) was awarded second place in the 2014 Intel International Science and Engineering Fair for his environmental management team project.	JPL · 31598
31599 Chloesherry	1999 FE_{49}	Chloe Sherry (born 1996) was awarded second place in the 2014 Intel International Science and Engineering Fair for her animal sciences project.	JPL · 31599
31600 Somasundaram	1999 FJ_{51}	Sriram Somasundaram (born 1997) was awarded second place in the 2014 Intel International Science and Engineering Fair for his biochemistry project.	JPL · 31600

== 31601–31700 ==
back to top

Named minor planet	Provisional	This minor planet was named for...	Ref; Catalog
31605 Braschi	1999 GM_{4}	Nicoletta Braschi, Italian actress	JPL · 31605
31613 Adamgreenberg	1999 GO_{8}	Adam Greenberg (b. 1989), an American astronomer.	IAU · 31613
31617 Meeraradha	1999 GP_{17}	Meera Radha Srinivasan (born 1997) was awarded second place in the 2014 Intel International Science and Engineering Fair for her environmental sciences project.	JPL · 31617
31618 Tharakan	1999 GE_{18}	Serena Margaret Tharakan (born 1996) was awarded second place in the 2014 Intel International Science and Engineering Fair for her medicine and health sciences team project.	JPL · 31618
31619 Jodietinker	1999 GU_{18}	Jodie Leigh Tinker (born 1996) was awarded first place in the 2014 Intel International Science and Engineering Fair for her cellular and molecular biology project.	JPL · 31619
31627 Ulmera	1999 GW_{20}	Alexandra Ulmer (born 1996) was awarded second place in the 2014 Intel International Science and Engineering Fair for her behavioral and social sciences team project.	JPL · 31627
31628 Vorperian	1999 GG_{23}	Sevahn Kayaneh Vorperian (born 1996) was awarded second place in the 2014 Intel International Science and Engineering Fair for her biochemistry project.	JPL · 31628
31630 Jennywang	1999 GN_{23}	Jenny Lynn Wang (born 1997) was awarded second place in the 2014 Intel International Science and Engineering Fair for her computer science project.	JPL · 31630
31631 Abbywilliams	1999 GL_{28}	Abigail Anne Williams (born 1997) was awarded second place in the 2014 Intel International Science and Engineering Fair for her animal sciences team project.	JPL · 31631
31632 Stephaying	1999 GM_{28}	Stephanie Ying (born 1996) was awarded second place in the 2014 Intel International Science and Engineering Fair for her microbiology project.	JPL · 31632
31633 Almonte	1999 GH_{30}	Carolyn Marie Almonte (born 2003), a finalist in the 2015 Broadcom MASTERS, a math and science competition for middle school students, for her medicine and health sciences project.	JPL · 31633
31635 Anandarao	1999 GW_{31}	Pranav Kumar Anandarao (born 2001), a finalist in the 2015 Broadcom MASTERS, a math and science competition for middle school students, for his energy project.	JPL · 31635
31637 Bhimaraju	1999 GF_{32}	Manasa Hari Bhimaraju (born 2003), a finalist in the 2015 Broadcom MASTERS, a math and science competition for middle school students, for her electrical and mechanical engineering project.	JPL · 31637
31639 Bodoni	1999 GC_{34}	Evelyn Ariana Bodoni (born 2002), a finalist in the 2015 Broadcom MASTERS, a math and science competition for middle school students, for her behavioral and social sciences project.	JPL · 31639
31640 Johncaven	1999 GH_{34}	John Blake Caven (born 2003), a finalist in the 2015 Broadcom MASTERS, a math and science competition for middle school students, for his computer science and software engineering project.	JPL · 31640
31641 Cevasco	1999 GW_{34}	Hannah Olivia Cevasco (born 2000), a finalist in the 2015 Broadcom MASTERS, a math and science competition for middle school students, for her medicine and health sciences project.	JPL · 31641
31642 Soyounchoi	1999 GX_{36}	Soyoun Choi (born 1999), a finalist in the 2015 Broadcom MASTERS, a math and science competition for middle school students, for her behavioral and social sciences project.	JPL · 31642
31643 Natashachugh	1999 GE_{41}	Natasha Chugh (born 2001), a finalist in the 2015 Broadcom MASTERS, a math and science competition for middle school students, for her electrical and mechanical engineering project.	JPL · 31643
31647 Beauwigman	1999 GY_{51}	Beau C. Wigman, American Facilities and Mechanical Technician at Lowell Observatory.	IAU · 31647
31648 Pedrosada	1999 GL_{53}	Pedro Antonio Valdés Sada (born 1973) is a professor of physics and mathematics at the Universidad de Monterrey (Mexico), whose research includes astrometry and photometry of asteroids as well as stellar occultations.	IAU · 31648
31650 Frýdek-Místek	1999 HW	Frýdek-Místek, twin cities on the Silesia-Moravia border, Czech Republic, the discoverer's childhood home town	JPL · 31650
31651 Edurnepasaban	1999 HH_{2}	Edurne Pasaban Lizarribar, Spanish mountaineer.	IAU · 31651
31655 Averyclowes	1999 HG_{7}	Avery Parker Clowes (born 2002), a finalist in the 2015 Broadcom MASTERS, a math and science competition for middle school students, for his electrical and mechanical engineering project.	JPL · 31655
31660 Maximiliandu	1999 HY_{10}	Maximilian Junqi Du (born 2002), a finalist in the 2015 Broadcom MASTERS, a math and science competition for middle school students, for his chemistry project.	JPL · 31660
31661 Eggebraaten	1999 HJ_{11}	Andrew John Eggebraaten (born 2001), a finalist in the 2015 Broadcom MASTERS, a math and science competition for middle school students, for his electrical and mechanical engineering project.	JPL · 31661
31663 Anjani	1999 JG_{2}	Anjani Polit (b. 1980), an American engineer.	IAU · 31663
31664 Randiiwessen	1999 JR_{2}	Randii Wessen, American program engineer at JPL	JPL · 31664
31665 Veblen	1999 JZ_{2}	Oswald Veblen, early 20th-century American mathematician	JPL · 31665
31671 Masatoshi	1999 JY_{7}	Masatoshi Nakamura, Japanese actor and singer	JPL · 31671
31673 Nayessda	1999 JZ_{8}	Nayessda “Nayi” Castro (b. 1987), an American engineer.	IAU · 31673
31674 Westermann	1999 JD_{9}	Mathilde Westermann (b. 1991), an American science operations and GIS engineer at the University of Arizona. || IAU · 31674	
31677 Audreyglende	1999 JQ_{18}	Audrey Glende (born 2003), a finalist in the 2015 Broadcom MASTERS, a math and science competition for middle school students, for her microbiology and biochemistry project.	JPL · 31677
31679 Glenngrimmett	1999 JJ_{19}	Glenn Manuel Grimmett (born 2001) is a finalist in the 2015 Broadcom MASTERS, a math and science competition for middle school students, for his animal science project.	JPL · 31679
31680 Josephuitt	1999 JK_{19}	Joseph Arthur Huitt (born 2000), a finalist in the 2015 Broadcom MASTERS, a math and science competition for middle school students, for his animal science project.	JPL · 31680
31682 Kinsey	1999 JU_{21}	Elizabeth Grace Kinsey (born 2001), a finalist in the 2015 Broadcom MASTERS, a math and science competition for middle school students, for her environmental and earth sciences project.	JPL · 31682
31684 Lindsay	1999 JS_{22}	Mikayla Ann Lindsay (born 2002), a finalist in the 2015 Broadcom MASTERS, a math and science competition for middle school students, for her physics project.	JPL · 31684
31688 Bryantliu	1999 JT_{27}	Bryant Michael Liu (born 2001), a finalist in the 2015 Broadcom MASTERS, a math and science competition for middle school students, for his plant science project	JPL · 31688
31689 Sebmellen	1999 JW_{27}	Sebastian Lucas Mellen (born 2001), a finalist in the 2015 Broadcom MASTERS, a math and science competition for middle school students, for his computer science and software engineering project.	JPL · 31689
31690 Nayamenezes	1999 JK_{28}	Naya Kiren Menezes (born 2001), a finalist in the 2015 Broadcom MASTERS, a math and science competition for middle school students, for her physics project.	JPL · 31690
31696 Rohitmital	1999 JF_{33}	Rohit Rahul Mital (born 2002), a finalist in the 2015 Broadcom MASTERS, a math and science competition for middle school students, for his environmental and earth sciences project.	JPL · 31696
31697 Isaiahoneal	1999 JG_{33}	Isaiah Logan O'Neal (born 2001), a finalist in the 2015 Broadcom MASTERS, a math and science competition for middle school students, for his plant science project.	JPL · 31697
31698 Nikolaiortiz	1999 JL_{33}	Nikolai Victorovitch Ortiz (born 2002) is a finalist in the 2015 Broadcom MASTERS, a math and science competition for middle school students, for his environmental and earth sciences project. He attends the Seashore Middle Academy, Corpus Christi, Texas	JPL · 31698
31700 Naperez	1999 JB_{40}	Nicholas Antonio Perez (born 2001), a finalist in the 2015 Broadcom MASTERS, a math and science competition for middle school students, for his materials & bioengineering project.	JPL · 31700

== 31701–31800 ==
back to top

Named minor planet	Provisional	This minor planet was named for...	Ref; Catalog
31701 Ragula	1999 JC_{40}	Kanishka Ragula (born 2001), a finalist in the 2015 Broadcom MASTERS, a math and science competition for middle school students, for his energy project.	JPL · 31701
31706 Singhani	1999 JX_{45}	Anish Singhani (born 2002), a finalist in the 2015 Broadcom MASTERS, a math and science competition for middle school students, for his electrical and mechanical engineering project.	JPL · 31706
31711 Suresh	1999 JY_{52}	Sriyaa Suresh (born 2001), a finalist in the 2015 Broadcom MASTERS, a math and science competition for middle school students, for her animal science project.	JPL · 31711
31716 Matoonder	1999 JJ_{57}	Madison Alise Toonder (born 2001), a finalist in the 2015 Broadcom MASTERS, a math and science competition for middle school students, for her environmental and earth sciences project.	JPL · 31716
31719 Davidyue	1999 JU_{58}	David Yue (born 2001), a finalist in the 2015 Broadcom MASTERS, a math and science competition for middle school students, for his computer science and software engineering project.	JPL · 31719
31725 Anushazaman	1999 JS_{66}	Anusha Zaman (born 2001), a finalist in the 2015 Broadcom MASTERS, a math and science competition for middle school students, for her cellular/molecular biology and biochemistry project.	JPL · 31725
31727 Amandalewis	1999 JU_{67}	Amanda Lewis, a mentor of a finalist in the 2015 Broadcom MASTERS, a math and science competition for middle school students.	JPL · 31727
31728 Rhondah	1999 JZ_{68}	Rhonda Hendrickson, a mentor of a finalist in the 2015 Broadcom MASTERS, a math and science competition for middle school students. JPL	MPC · 31728
31729 Scharmen	1999 JO_{69}	Chris Scharmen, a mentor of a finalist in the 2015 Broadcom MASTERS, a math and science competition for middle school students.	JPL · 31729
31731 Johnwiley	1999 JX_{70}	John Wiley, a mentor of a finalist in the 2015 Broadcom MASTERS, a math and science competition for middle school students.	JPL · 31731
31737 Carriecoombs	1999 JT_{75}	Carrie Coombs, a mentor of a finalist in the 2015 Broadcom MASTERS, a math and science competition for middle school students.	JPL · 31737
31744 Shimshock	1999 JN_{79}	Nicole Shimshock, a mentor of a finalist in the 2015 Broadcom MASTERS, a math and science competition for middle school students.	JPL · 31744
31767 Jennimartin	1999 JN_{116}	Jennifer Martin, a mentor of a finalist in the 2015 Broadcom MASTERS, a math and science competition for middle school students.	JPL · 31767
31770 Melivanhouten	1999 JK_{118}	Melissa Van Houten, a mentor of a finalist in the 2015 Broadcom MASTERS, a math and science competition for middle school students.	JPL · 31770
31771 Kirstenwright	1999 JX_{119}	Kirsten Wright, a mentor of a finalist in the 2015 Broadcom MASTERS, a math and science competition for middle school students.	JPL · 31771
31772 Asztalos	1999 JW_{120}	Melissa Asztalos, a mentor of a finalist in the 2015 Broadcom MASTERS, a math and science competition for middle school students.	JPL · 31772
31774 Debralas	1999 JW_{121}	Amy Winegar, a mentor of a finalist in the 2015 Broadcom MASTERS, a math and science competition for middle school students.	JPL · 31774
31777 Amywinegar	1999 JO_{125}	Amy Winegar, a mentor of a finalist in the 2015 Broadcom MASTERS, a math and science competition for middle school students.	JPL · 31777
31778 Richardschnur	1999 JT_{125}	Richard Schnur, a mentor of a finalist in the 2015 Broadcom MASTERS, a math and science competition for middle school students.	JPL · 31778
31787 Darcylawson	1999 KH_{14}	Darcy Lawson, a mentor of a finalist in the 2015 Broadcom MASTERS, a math and science competition for middle school students.	JPL · 31787

== 31801–31900 ==
back to top

Named minor planet	Provisional	This minor planet was named for...	Ref; Catalog
31807 Shaunalennon	1999 NP_{17}	Shauna Lennon, a mentor of a finalist in the 2015 Broadcom MASTERS, a math and science competition for middle school students.	JPL · 31807
31823 Viète	1999 TN_{3}	François Viète, 16th-century French lawyer and mathematician, inventor of the modern algebraic notation	JPL · 31823
31824 Elatus	1999 UG_{5}	Elatus, mythological centaur, killed during a battle with Hercules by a poisoned arrow that passed through his arm and continued to wound Chiron in the knee	JPL · 31824
31828 Martincordiner	1999 VU_{199}	Martin Cordiner (b. 1979), a British astronomer.	IAU · 31828
31836 Poshedly	2000 BU_{34}	Kenneth T. Poshedly (born 1949) is the tireless publisher and editor-in-chief of the Journal of the Association of Lunar and Planetary Observers. In 2010 he won the Peggy Haas Service Award for his work with that organization.	JPL · 31836
31838 Angelarob	2000 CV_{48}	Angela Robinson, a mentor of a finalist in the 2015 Broadcom MASTERS, a math and science competition for middle school students.	JPL · 31838
31839 Depinto	2000 CW_{50}	Alyssa DePinto, a mentor of a finalist in the 2015 Broadcom MASTERS, a math and science competition for middle school students.	JPL · 31839
31840 Normnegus	2000 CG_{51}	Norm Negus, a mentor of a finalist in the 2015 Broadcom MASTERS, a math and science competition for middle school students.	JPL · 31840
31844 Mattwill	2000 DQ_{15}	Matthew L. Will (born 1957) is an amateur astronomer and longtime secretary and treasurer of the Association of the Lunar and Planetary Observers. In 2003 he was presented with the Peggy Haas Service Award for his work with that organization.	JPL · 31844
31846 Elainegillum	2000 DQ_{47}	Elaine Gillum, a mentor of a finalist in the 2015 Broadcom MASTERS, a math and science competition for middle school students.	JPL · 31846
31848 Mikemattei	2000 EM_{21}	Michael Mattei (born 1940) worked at Harvard College Observatory Agassiz Station as a young man moving to optics with various institutions and companies culminating in his work with M.I.T. Lincoln Labs working on projects from microscope optics to space telescopes.	JPL · 31848
31853 Rahulmital	2000 EW_{47}	Rahul Mital, a mentor of a finalist in the 2015 Broadcom MASTERS, a math and science competition for middle school students.	JPL · 31853
31854 Darshanashah	2000 EB_{48}	Darshana Shah, a mentor of a finalist in the 2015 Broadcom MASTERS, a math and science competition for middle school students.	JPL · 31854
31858 Raykanipe	2000 EL_{59}	Raymond Kanipe, a mentor of a finalist in the 2015 Broadcom MASTERS, a math and science competition for middle school students.	JPL · 31858
31859 Zemaitis	2000 EB_{66}	Valerie Zemaitis, a mentor of a finalist in the 2015 Broadcom MASTERS, a math and science competition for middle school students.	JPL · 31859
31861 Darleshimizu	2000 EX_{68}	Darlene Shimizu, a mentor of a finalist in the 2015 Broadcom MASTERS, a math and science competition for middle school students.	JPL · 31861
31862 Garfinkle	2000 EY_{70}	Robert A. Garfinkle (born 1947) is a Fellow of the Royal Astronomical Society and author of best-selling observational astronomy books and many articles. He is also the British Astronomical Association Lunar Section Historian and the Association of Lunar and Planetary Observers Book Review Editor.	JPL · 31862
31863 Hazelcoffman	2000 EE_{84}	Hazel Coffman, a mentor of a finalist in the 2015 Broadcom MASTERS, a math and science competition for middle school students.	JPL · 31863
31872 Terkán	2000 EL_{106}	Lajos Terkán, early 20th-century member of the staff of the Konkoly Obszervatórium (Konkoly Observatory), who proposed and initiated the photographic observation of comets and minor planets there	JPL · 31872
31873 Toliou	2000 EA_{130}	Athanasia (Sissy) Toliou (born 1988) is a postdoctoral researcher at the Luleå University of Technology (Sweden) whose studies include the orbital dynamics of near-Earth objects and primordial asteroids and comets.	IAU · 31873
31874 Kosiarek	2000 EF_{135}	Molly Kosiarek (b. 1994), an American astronomer.	IAU · 31874
31875 Saksena	2000 EG_{136}	Hitu Saksena, a mentor of a finalist in the 2015 Broadcom MASTERS, a math and science competition for middle school students.	JPL · 31875
31876 Jenkens	2000 EA_{142}	Robert Jenkens (born 1962), Deputy Project Manager for the OSIRIS-REx Asteroid Sample Return Mission.	JPL · 31876
31877 Davideverett	2000 EX_{144}	David Everett (born 1964), Project Systems Engineer for the OSIRIS-REx Asteroid Sample Return Mission.	JPL · 31877
31883 Susanstern	2000 FD_{22}	Susan Stern, a mentor of a finalist in the 2015 Broadcom MASTERS, a math and science competition for middle school students.	JPL · 31883
31884 Evangelista	2000 FK_{27}	Marçal Evangelista Santana (b. 1987), a Brazilian planetary scientist.	IAU · 31884
31885 Greggweger	2000 FJ_{32}	Gregg Weger, a mentor of a finalist in the 2015 Broadcom MASTERS, a math and science competition for middle school students.	JPL · 31885
31886 Verlisak	2000 FN_{32}	Verlisa Kennedy, a mentor of a finalist in the 2015 Broadcom MASTERS, a math and science competition for middle school students.	JPL · 31886
31888 Polizzi	2000 FM_{35}	Cristian David Polizzi (born 1996) was awarded second place in the 2015 Intel International Science and Engineering Fair for his energy team project.	JPL · 31888
31893 Rodriguezalvarez	2000 FB_{44}	Agustin Rodriguez Alvarez (born 1996) was awarded second place in the 2015 Intel International Science and Engineering Fair for his energy team project	JPL · 31893
31896 Gaydarov	2000 FZ_{48}	Petar Milkov Gaydarov (born 1996) was awarded second place in the 2015 Intel International Science and Engineering Fair for his math project.	JPL · 31896
31897 Brooksdasilva	2000 FT_{49}	Candace Rose Brooks-Da Silva (born 1999) was awarded second place in the 2015 Intel International Science and Engineering Fair for her engineering mechanics project.	JPL · 31897
31899 Adityamohan	2000 GG_{7}	Aditya Anand Mohan (born 1997) was awarded first place in the 2015 Intel International Science and Engineering Fair for his biomedical and health sciences project.	JPL · 31899

== 31901–32000 ==
back to top

Named minor planet	Provisional	This minor planet was named for...	Ref; Catalog
31901 Amitscheer	2000 GU_{18}	Amit Scheer (born 1998) was awarded second place in the 2015 Intel International Science and Engineering Fair for his biomedical and health sciences project.	JPL · 31901
31902 Raymondwang	2000 GN_{19}	Raymond Wang (born 1998) was awarded best of category award and first place in the 2015 Intel ISEF for his engineering mechanics project. He also received the Gordon E. Moore Award and the Cultural and Scientific Visit to China Award.	JPL · 31902
31903 Euniceyou	2000 GK_{26}	Eunice Linh You (born 1996) was awarded first place in the 2015 Intel International Science and Engineering Fair for her microbiology project.	JPL · 31903
31904 Haoruochen	2000 GX_{34}	Hao Ruochen (born 1997) was awarded best of category award and first place in the 2015 Intel ISEF for his physics and astronomy project. He also received the London International Youth Science Forum, Philip V. Streich Memorial Award.	JPL · 31904
31905 Likinpong	2000 GM_{40}	Li Kin Pong Michael (born 1997) was awarded second place in the 2015 Intel International Science and Engineering Fair for his materials science team project.	JPL · 31905
31907 Wongsumming	2000 GR_{44}	Wong Sum Ming Simon (born 1997) was awarded second place in the 2015 Intel International Science and Engineering Fair for his materials science team project.	JPL · 31907
31909 Chenweitung	2000 GP_{52}	Chen Wei-Tung (born 1998) was awarded first place in the 2015 Intel International Science and Engineering Fair for his embedded systems project.	JPL · 31909
31910 Moustafa	2000 GJ_{53}	Yasmine Yehya Moustafa (born 1998) was awarded first place in the 2015 Intel International Science and Engineering Fair for her earth and environmental sciences project.	JPL · 31910
31911 Luciafauth	2000 GE_{54}	Lucia Fauth (b. 1997) was awarded best of category award and first place in the 2015 Intel ISEF for her embedded systems project. She also received the Intel Foundation Cultural and Scientific Visit to China Award. She attends the Friedrich-Schiller-Gymnasium, Marbach am Neckar, Germany.	JPL · 31911
31912 Lukasgrafner	2000 GM_{54}	Lukas Grafner (born 1997) was awarded second place in the 2015 Intel International Science and Engineering Fair for his engineering mechanics team project.	JPL · 31912
31916 Arnehensel	2000 GC_{67}	Arne Hensel (born 1996) was awarded best of category award and first place in the 2015 Intel ISEF for his chemistry project. He also received the Dudley R. Hershbach SIYSS Award.	JPL · 31916
31917 Lukashohne	2000 GH_{67}	Lukas Hohne (born 1997) was awarded second place in the 2015 Intel International Science and Engineering Fair for his engineering mechanics team project.	JPL · 31917
31918 Onkargujral	2000 GW_{67}	Onkar Singh Gujral (born 1996) was awarded second place in the 2015 Intel International Science and Engineering Fair for his systems software project.	JPL · 31918
31919 Carragher	2000 GC_{69}	Christopher Carragher (born 1996) was awarded second place in the 2015 Intel International Science and Engineering Fair for his computational biology and bioinformatics project.	JPL · 31919
31920 Annamcevoy	2000 GX_{69}	Anna Maria McEvoy (born 1996) was awarded second place in the 2015 Intel International Science and Engineering Fair for her plant sciences project.	JPL · 31920
31922 Alsharif	2000 GD_{72}	Shaima Lutfi Al-Sharif (born 1999) was awarded second place in the 2015 Intel International Science and Engineering Fair for her behavioral and social sciences project.	JPL · 31922
31925 Krutovskiy	2000 GW_{75}	Roman Krutovskiy (born 1998) was awarded second place in the 2015 Intel International Science and Engineering Fair for his math project.	JPL · 31925
31926 Alhamood	2000 GW_{76}	Abdul Jabbar Abdulrazaq Alhamood (born 1996) was awarded best of category award and first place in the 2015 Intel ISEF for his plant sciences project. He also received the Dudley R. Hershbach SIYSS Award.	JPL · 31926
31928 Limzhengtheng	2000 GU_{78}	Lim Zheng Theng (born 1998) was awarded second place in the 2015 Intel International Science and Engineering Fair for his environmental engineering team project.	JPL · 31928
31931 Sipiera	2000 GW_{82}	Paul P. Sipiera, American planetary geologist and meteoricist	JPL · 31931
31933 Tanyizhao	2000 GY_{85}	Tan Yi Zhao (born 1998) was awarded second place in the 2015 Intel International Science and Engineering Fair for his environmental engineering team project.	JPL · 31933
31934 Benjamintan	2000 GE_{88}	Tan Kye Jyn Benjamin (born 1998) was awarded second place in the 2015 Intel International Science and Engineering Fair for his environmental engineering team project.	JPL · 31934
31935 Midgley	2000 GY_{88}	Anna Illing Midgley (born 1999) was awarded second place in the 2015 Intel International Science and Engineering Fair for her plant sciences project.	JPL · 31935
31936 Bernardsmit	2000 GP_{95}	Bernard Adriaan Smit (born 1997) was awarded second place in the 2015 Intel International Science and Engineering Fair for his microbiology project.	JPL · 31936
31937 Kangsunwoo	2000 GZ_{98}	Kang Sun Woo (born 1997) was awarded second place in the 2015 Intel International Science and Engineering Fair for her earth and environmental sciences project.	JPL · 31937
31938 Nattapong	2000 GL_{99}	Nattapong Chueasiritaworn (born 2000) was awarded best of category award and first place in the 2015 Intel ISEF for his animal sciences team project. He also received the European Union Contest for Young Scientists Award.	JPL · 31938
31939 Thananon	2000 GC_{101}	Thananon Hiranwanichchakorn (born 1998) was awarded best of category award and first place in the 2015 Intel ISEF for his animal sciences team project. He also received the European Union Contest for Young Scientists Award.	JPL · 31939
31940 Sutthiluk	2000 GQ_{104}	Sutthiluk Rakdee (born 1999) was awarded best of category award and first place in the 2015 Intel International Science and Engineering Fair for her animal sciences team project.	JPL · 31940
31943 Tahsinelmas	2000 GJ_{106}	Tahsin Elmas (born 1996) was awarded second place in the 2015 Intel International Science and Engineering Fair for his chemistry team project	JPL · 31943
31944 Seyitherdem	2000 GP_{107}	Seyit Alp Herdem (born 1995) was awarded second place in the 2015 Intel International Science and Engineering Fair for his chemistry team project	JPL · 31944
31946 Sahilabbi	2000 GM_{109}	Sahil Abbi (born 1999) was awarded second place in the 2015 Intel International Science and Engineering Fair for his systems software team project	JPL · 31946
31948 Marciarieke	2000 GH_{110}	Marcia Jean Rieke (b. 1951), an American astronomer.	IAU · 31948
31951 Alexisallen	2000 GL_{123}	Alexis Sue Allen (born 1998) was awarded first place in the 2015 Intel International Science and Engineering Fair for her animal sciences project.	JPL · 31951
31952 Bialtdecelie	2000 GS_{123}	Meghan Dong Duo Bialt-DeCelie (born 1997) was awarded second place in the 2015 Intel International Science and Engineering Fair for her plant sciences team project.	JPL · 31952
31953 Bontha	2000 GZ_{125}	Naveena Bontha (born 1999) was awarded second place in the 2015 Intel International Science and Engineering Fair for her engineering mechanics project	JPL · 31953
31954 Georgiebotev	2000 GJ_{126}	Georgie Botev (born 1998) was awarded second place in the 2015 Intel International Science and Engineering Fair for his embedded systems project	JPL · 31954
31956 Wald	2000 GA_{133}	Abraham Wald, 20th-century American statistician	JPL · 31956
31957 Braunstein	2000 GP_{133}	Simone Braunstein (born 1997) was awarded second place in the 2015 Intel International Science and Engineering Fair for her robotics and intelligent machines project.	JPL · 31957
31959 Keianacave	2000 GD_{136}	Keiana Ashli Cavé (born 1998) was awarded second place in the 2015 Intel International Science and Engineering Fair for her earth and environmental sciences project.	JPL · 31959
31960 Fabioferrari	2000 GC_{142}	Fabio Ferrari (b. 1988), an Italian professor at Politecnico di Milano.	IAU · 31960
31961 Andreaferrero	2000 GJ_{142}	Andrea Ferrero (b. 1971), an Italian amateur astronomer.	IAU · 31961
31962 Rayharvey	2000 GE_{153}	Ray Harvey (1962–2022), an American engineer.	IAU · 31962
31963 Tanjamichalik	2000 GE_{154}	Tanja Michalik (b. 1986), a German scientist.	IAU · 31963
31969 Yihuachen	2000 HL_{7}	Yi Hua Chen (born 1998) was awarded second place in the 2015 Intel International Science and Engineering Fair for her cellular and molecular biology project.	JPL · 31969
31971 Beatricechoi	2000 HP_{9}	Seung Hye (Beatrice) Choi (born 1998) was awarded second place in the 2015 Intel International Science and Engineering Fair for her chemistry project.	JPL · 31971
31972 Carlycrump	2000 HX_{9}	Carly Elizabeth Crump (born 1996) was awarded best of category award and first place in the 2015 Intel ISEF for her microbiology project. She also received the Dudley R. Hershbach SIYSS Award.	JPL · 31972
31973 Ashwindatta	2000 HO_{10}	Ashwin Nivas Datta (born 1998) was awarded first place in the 2015 Intel International Science and Engineering Fair for his engineering mechanics project.	JPL · 31973
31975 Johndean	2000 HA_{13}	John L. Dean (born 1997) was awarded second place in the 2015 Intel International Science and Engineering Fair for his physics and astronomy project.	JPL · 31975
31976 Niyatidesai	2000 HH_{13}	Niyati Ketan Desai (born 1997) was awarded second place in the 2015 Intel International Science and Engineering Fair for her physics and astronomy project.	JPL · 31976
31977 Devalapurkar	2000 HZ_{13}	Sanath Kumar Devalapurkar (born 2000) was awarded best of category award and first place in the 2015 Intel ISEF for his math project. He also received the European Union Contest for Young Scientists Award.	JPL · 31977
31978 Jeremyphilip	2000 HA_{14}	Jeremy Philip D´Silva (born 1999) was awarded second place in the 2015 Intel International Science and Engineering Fair for his biomedical and health sciences project.	JPL · 31978
31980 Axelfeldmann	2000 HJ_{14}	Axel Stephan Feldmann (born 1997) was awarded second place in the 2015 Intel International Science and Engineering Fair for his computational biology and bioinformatics project.	JPL · 31980
31982 Johnwallis	2000 HS_{20}	John Wallis, 17th-century British mathematician, inventor of the symbol ∞ for infinity	JPL · 31982
31984 Unger	2000 HR_{23}	Adam Unger (born 1919), a basket maker by profession, was heavily involved in the construction of the Starkenburg Observatory.	JPL · 31984
31985 Andrewryan	2000 HV_{23}	Andrew J. Ryan (born 1988) is a postdoctoral research associate at University of Arizona and works on the OSIRIS-Rex mission to asteroid (101955) Bennu. He is an expert in the thermal conductivity of planetary materials.	IAU · 31985
31988 Jasonfiacco	2000 HT_{29}	Jason Christopher Fiacco (born 1998) was awarded second place in the 2015 Intel International Science and Engineering Fair for his biochemistry team project.	JPL · 31988
31991 Royghosh	2000 HK_{35}	Roy Ghosh (born 2000) was awarded second place in the 2015 Intel International Science and Engineering Fair for his biomedical and health sciences project. JPL	MPC · 31991
31996 Goecknerwald	2000 HO_{42}	Claire Goeckner-Wald (born 1996) was awarded second place in the 2015 Intel International Science and Engineering Fair for her physics and astronomy team project.	JPL · 31996
31998 Maxlevine	2000 HN_{44}	Max Levine, American member of the Facilities team at Lowell Observatory.	IAU · 31998

back to top

Preceded by 30,001–31,000	Meanings of minor-planet names List of minor planets: 31,001–32,000	Succeeded by 32,001–33,000
