= 31824 Elatus =

Centaur

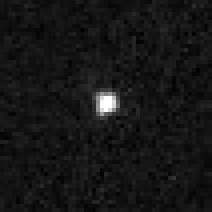
- Hubble Space Telescope image of Elatus taken in 2009

Discovery
- Discovered by: Catalina Sky Srvy.
- Discovery site: Mount Lemmon Obs.
- Discovery date: 29 October 1999

Designations
- Pronunciation: /ˈɛlətəs/
- Named after: Elatus (Greek mythology)
- Alternative designations: 1999 UG_{5}
- Minor planet category: centaur · distant
- Symbol: or (astrological)

Orbital characteristics
- Epoch 4 September 2017 (JD 2458000.5)
- Uncertainty parameter 2
- Observation arc: 10.58 yr (3,864 days)
- Aphelion: 16.298 AU
- Perihelion: 7.3239 AU
- Semi-major axis: 11.811 AU
- Eccentricity: 0.3799
- Orbital period (sidereal): 40.59 yr (14,826 days)
- Mean anomaly: 170.74°
- Mean motion: 0° 1^{m} 27.48^{s} / day
- Inclination: 5.2447°
- Longitude of ascending node: 87.158°
- Argument of perihelion: 281.62°

Physical characteristics
- Mean diameter: 45.87 km (derived); 49.8±10.4 km 57.000±15.900 km
- Synodic rotation period: 26.5 h 26.82 h
- Geometric albedo: 0.049±0.028; 0.050±0.028; 0.057 (assumed)
- Spectral type: RR; B–V = 1.020±0.060; V–R = 0.620±0.048
- Absolute magnitude (H): 10.1 · 10.32 · 10.40±0.09 · 10.42 · 10.439±0.107 (R) · 10.49 · 10.61

31824 Elatus (/ˈɛlətəs/; provisional designation 1999 UG_{5}) is a very red centaur from the outer Solar System, approximately 48 kilometers (30 miles) in diameter. It was discovered on 29 October 1999, by astronomers of the Catalina Sky Survey at Mount Lemmon Observatory in Arizona, United States. The minor planet was named after Elatus, a centaur from Greek mythology.

== Orbit and classification ==
Elatus orbits the Sun at a distance of 7.3–16.3 AU once every 40 years and 7 months (14,826 days). Its orbit has an eccentricity of 0.38 and an inclination of 5° with respect to the ecliptic.

The body's observation arc begins with a precovery taken by the Sloan Digital Sky Survey at Apache Point Observatory in September 1998, thirteen months prior to its official discovery observation.

== Naming ==
This minor planet was named after Elatus, a centaur from Greek mythology, who was killed during a battle with Heracles (also see 5143 Heracles) by a poisoned arrow that passed through his arm and continued to wound Chiron in the knee (also see 2060 Chiron). The name "Elatus" means "fir man" and is associated with woodlands. The official naming citation was published by the Minor Planet Center on 14 June 2003 (M.P.C. 49102).

== Physical characteristics ==
=== Rotation period ===
Two rotational lightcurves of Elatus were obtained from photometric observations. Lightcurve analysis gave a longer-than-average rotation period of 26.5 and 26.82 hours with a concurring brightness variation of 0.10 magnitude (U=2/2).

=== Diameter and albedo ===
According to observations by ESA's Herschel Space Observatory with its PACS instrument and the survey carried out by the NEOWISE mission of NASA's Wide-field Infrared Survey Explorer Elatus measures 49.8 and 57.000 kilometers in diameter and its surface has an albedo of 0.049 and 0.050, respectively. The Collaborative Asteroid Lightcurve Link assumes a standard albedo for carbonaceous minor planets of 0.057 and derives a diameter of 45.87 kilometers based on an absolute magnitude of 10.42.

== See also ==
- List of centaurs (small Solar System bodies) § 31824
