= 37452 Spirit =

Main-belt asteroid

Discovery
- Discovered by: C. J. van Houten; I. van Houten-G. T. Gehrels
- Discovery site: Palomar Obs.
- Discovery date: 24 September 1960

Designations
- Named after: Spirit (rover) (Mars Exploration Rover)
- Alternative designations: 4282 P-L · 2000 WD_{183} 2000 WO_{133}
- Minor planet category: main-belt · (outer) · Hildian

Orbital characteristics
- Epoch 4 September 2017 (JD 2458000.5)
- Uncertainty parameter 0
- Observation arc: 56.28 yr (20,555 days)
- Aphelion: 4.8206 AU
- Perihelion: 3.0794 AU
- Semi-major axis: 3.9500 AU
- Eccentricity: 0.2204
- Orbital period (sidereal): 7.85 yr (2,867 days)
- Mean anomaly: 55.498°
- Mean motion: 0° 7^{m} 31.8^{s} / day
- Inclination: 8.2643°
- Longitude of ascending node: 352.31°
- Argument of perihelion: 48.191°
- Jupiter MOID: 0.8488 AU

Physical characteristics
- Dimensions: 8.889±0.756 km
- Geometric albedo: 0.056±0.022
- Absolute magnitude (H): 14.2

37452 Spirit (provisional designation 4282 P-L) is a dark Hildian asteroid from the outermost region of the asteroid belt, approximately 9 kilometers in diameter.

The asteroid was discovered on 24 September 1960, by Dutch astronomers Ingrid and Cornelis van Houten at Leiden, on photographic plates taken by Tom Gehrels at Palomar Observatory, California. It was named after NASA's Spirit Mars rover.

== Orbit and classification ==
Spirit is a member of the Hilda family of asteroids, which stay in a 3:2 orbital resonance with the gas-giant Jupiter, meaning that for every two orbits Jupiter completes, a Hildian asteroid will complete three orbits. As their orbit does not cross the path of any of the planets, it will therefore not be pulled out of orbit by Jupiter's gravitational field and likely remain in a stable orbit for thousands of years.

Spirit orbits the Sun in the outermost main-belt at a distance of 3.1–4.8 AU once every 7 years and 10 months (2,867 days). Its orbit has an eccentricity of 0.22 and an inclination of 8° with respect to the ecliptic.

The body's observation arc begins with its official discovery observation, as no precoveries were taken and no prior identifications were made.

=== Palomar–Leiden survey ===
The survey designation "P-L" stands for Palomar–Leiden, named after Palomar Observatory and Leiden Observatory, which collaborated on the fruitful Palomar–Leiden survey in the 1960s. Gehrels used Palomar's Samuel Oschin telescope (also known as the 48-inch Schmidt Telescope), and shipped the photographic plates to Ingrid and Cornelis van Houten at Leiden Observatory where astrometry was carried out. The trio are credited with the discovery of several thousand minor planets.

== Physical characteristics ==
According to the survey carried out by the NEOWISE mission of NASA's Wide-field Infrared Survey Explorer, Spirit measures 8.9 kilometers in diameter and its surface has an albedo of 0.056, which is typical value for carbonaceous C-type asteroids. It has an absolute magnitude of 14.2.

As of 2017, Spirit's rotation period and shape, as well as its spectral type remain unknown.

== Naming ==
This minor planet was named by the discoverers for NASA's successful Mars rover Spirit which had been exploring the rocks and minerals in the Martian Gusev crater. The official naming citation was published by the Minor Planet Center on 28 September 2004 (M.P.C. 52770). 39382 Opportunity, also an asteroid of the Hilda family and discovered on the same day, was named after Spirit's twin rover, Opportunity.
