= 39382 Opportunity =

Main-belt asteroid

Discovery
- Discovered by: C. J. van Houten; I. van Houten-G. T. Gehrels
- Discovery site: Palomar Obs.
- Discovery date: 24 September 1960

Designations
- Named after: Opportunity (rover) (Mars Exploration Rover)
- Alternative designations: 2696 P-L
- Minor planet category: main-belt · (outer) · Hildian

Orbital characteristics
- Epoch 4 September 2017 (JD 2458000.5)
- Uncertainty parameter 0
- Observation arc: 56.34 yr (20,579 days)
- Aphelion: 4.7586 AU
- Perihelion: 3.1642 AU
- Semi-major axis: 3.9614 AU
- Eccentricity: 0.2012
- Orbital period (sidereal): 7.88 yr (2,880 days)
- Mean anomaly: 56.818°
- Mean motion: 0° 7^{m} 30^{s} / day
- Inclination: 2.9017°
- Longitude of ascending node: 129.01°
- Argument of perihelion: 297.44°
- Jupiter MOID: 0.5914 AU
- T_{Jupiter}: 3.0210

Physical characteristics
- Dimensions: 7 km (generic at 0.05); 7.453±2.290 km
- Geometric albedo: 0.061±0.016
- Absolute magnitude (H): 14.5

39382 Opportunity (provisional designation 2696 P-L) is a dark Hilidan asteroid from the outermost region of the asteroid belt, approximately 7.5 kilometers in diameter. Discovered during the Palomar–Leiden survey at Palomar Observatory in 1960, it was named for NASA's Opportunity Mars rover.

== Discovery ==
Opportunity was discovered on 24 September 1960, by Dutch astronomer couple Ingrid and Cornelis van Houten, as well as Dutch–American astronomer Tom Gehrels from photographic plates taken at the Palomar Observatory, California, United States.

=== Survey designation ===
The survey designation "P-L" stands for "Palomar–Leiden", named after Palomar Observatory and Leiden Observatory, which collaborated on the fruitful Palomar–Leiden survey in the 1960s. Gehrels used Palomar's Samuel Oschin telescope (also known as the 48-inch Schmidt Telescope), and shipped the photographic plates to Ingrid and Cornelis van Houten at Leiden Observatory where astrometry was carried out. The trio are credited with the discovery of several thousand minor planets.

== Orbit and classification ==
Located in the outermost part of the main-belt, Opportunity is a member of the Hilda family, a large group of asteroids that are thought to have originated from the Kuiper belt. They orbit in a 3:2 orbital resonance with the gas giant Jupiter, meaning that for every 2 orbits Jupiter completes around the Sun, a Hildian asteroid will complete 3 orbits.

Opportunity orbits the Sun at a distance of 3.2–4.8 AU once every 7 years and 11 months (2,880 days). Its orbit has an eccentricity of 0.20 and an inclination of 3° with respect to the ecliptic. The asteroid's orbit does not cross the path of any of the planets and therefore it will not be pulled out of orbit by Jupiter's gravitational field. As a result of this, it is likely that the asteroid will remain in a stable orbit for thousands of years.

The body's observation arc begins with its official discovery observation, as no precoveries were taken and no prior identifications were made.

== Physical characteristics ==
=== Diameter and albedo ===
According to the survey carried out by NASA's Wide-field Infrared Survey Explorer with its subsequent NEOWISE mission, Opportunity measures 7.45 kilometers in diameter and its surface has an albedo of 0.061, which is typical for carbonaceous asteroids. A generic magnitude-to-diameter conversion, gives a diameter of 7 kilometers, for an absolute magnitude of 14.5 and an assumed albedo of 0.05.

=== Lightcurves ===
As of 2017, the asteroid's composition, shape and rotation period remain unknown.

== Naming ==
This minor planet was named after a Mars Exploration Rover, Opportunity, following a proposal by the discoverer Ingrid van Houten-Groeneveld. The approved naming citation was published by the Minor Planet Center on 28 September 2004 (M.P.C. 52770). The minor planet 37452 Spirit was named for Opportunity's twin rover, Spirit.
