= Nanotechnology for water purification =

There are many water purifiers available in the market which use different techniques like boiling, filtration, distillation, chlorination, sedimentation and oxidation. Currently nanotechnology plays a vital role in water purification techniques. Nanotechnology is the process of manipulating atoms on a nanoscale. In nanotechnology, nanomembranes are used with the purpose of softening the water and removal of contaminants such as physical, biological and chemical contaminants. There are a variety of techniques in nanotechnology which use nanoparticles for providing safe drinking water with a high level of effectiveness. Some techniques have become commercialized.

For better water purification or treatment processes nanotechnology is preferred. Many different types of nanomaterials or nanoparticles are used in water treatment processes. Nanotechnology is useful in regards to remediation, desalination, filtration, purification and water treatment.

The main features that make nanoparticles effective for water treatment are

- More surface area
- Small volume
- The higher the surface area and volume, the particles become stronger, more stable and durable
- Materials may change electrical, optical, physical, chemical, or biological properties at the nano level
- Makes chemical and biological reactions easier

Current commercial water purifiers using nanotechnology include the LifeSaver bottle, Lifesaver Jerrycan, Lifesaver Cube, Nanoceram, and NanoH2O.

== Nanocellulose based water purification system ==
Nanocellulose based renewable material has a combination of high surface area with high material strength. It is chemically inert and possesses versatile hydrophilic surface chemistry. These properties make them a most promising nanomaterial for usage as a membrane and filter in water purification systems to remove bacterial and chemical contaminants from polluted water. It is noted that nanocellulose material has high potential in water purification technology. Different types of nanocellulose materials available for water purification system includes Cellulose nanocrystals (CNC) and Cellulose nanofibrils (CNF). These are the rod-like nanomaterials whose size ranges from 100 to 2000 nm with the diameter of 2 to 20 nm. Those length and diameter are mostly based on origin and preparation route for the synthesis of nanocellulose. Those nanocellulose materials are used to remove organic pollutants in water such as dyes, oils and pesticides traces present in water. Currently, fully biobased membrane using nanocellulose are fabricated which is used to remove metal ions such as Cu2+, Fe2+ etc, sulfates, fluorides and other organic compounds. This bio-based nanocellulose filter has more advantage to conventional filters. Nanocellulose is prepared by various methods such as sulphuric acid hydrolysis and mechanical grinding method. Water purification system is mainly based on the principle of absorption. For the absorption of anionic metal species, the nanocellulose materials are functionalized with a positive charged cationic group. Similarly, for the absorption of cationic metal species, the nanocellulose material is functionalized with the negatively charged anionic group. Nanocellulose based materials have limitation in cost for large-scale production and its specificity. Current research is based on the synthesis of hybrid nanocellulose material in combination with several other nanomaterials for the improvement of adsorption capacity.

== Graphene coated nanofilter ==
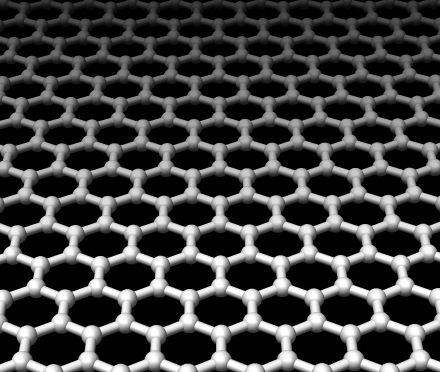

Graphene is chemically dormant, mechanically sturdy, and non-permeable to gas or liquid. So, carbon plays a major role for fabrication of nanomaterials with porous nature. Graphene membranes that are formed by graphene oxide molecules or chemically converted graphene that is adhered with 2D nano mediated arrays have the ability to efficiently separate molecules in a gas or in a liquid phase. Graphene-coated nanomembranes are said to be more applicable in water treatment due to its unique properties. Graphene membranes are obtained from vacuum filtration or coating of graphene oxide solution as Graphene oxide sheets. The graphene coated nanofiltration membrane showed a higher water flux range. The graphene embedded with carbon nanotubes to serve as nanofilters is more useful for dye rejection in water effluent, removal of salt ions, and also acts as antifouling agent. Graphene nanofilter membranes possess effective antifouling agent due to its strong bond between graphene sheets and proteins. Also, graphene oxide coated nanofilter membranes helps in dechlorination of water. In addition to this, ultrathin nanofilter coated with graphene is the most potent filter that could be commercialized for water purification. Graphene oxide membranes can be used in various forms such as free, surface modified, and graphene cast in membranes in the range of micro, nano, or ultrafilters. Among which nanofilters is more efficient for water desalination due to its mechanical strength and physiochemical properties of the membrane. Moreover, there are some challenges in fabricating and applying graphene oxide based nanofilters for water desalination. The challenges include mechanical instability if nanofilters are in the form of nanosheets, cost strategy, surface flaws, and assembly. Therefore, there are more scopes in this area of research to be worked on for the betterment of the society.

== Electrochemical Carbon nanotube filter ==
Carbon nanotubes have gained much attention for its use as wastewater and water filter. Carbon nanotube’s mechanical, electrical and chemical properties made it unique and an ideal candidate for research since 1990. Carbon nanotube combined with electrochemistry proved to be the best method for water and wastewater purification. Electrochemistry helps in reducing the fouling rate of the CNT. In case of CNT based ultra-filters modified with electrochemistry, helps in reducing the energy by two folds comparing to an unmodified CNT based filters. Thus electrochemical carbon nanotubes have been developed due to the advanced studies in nanotechnology and electrochemistry. Here the electrochemical activity of the CNT is exploited. Very first electrochemical CNT was developed by P.J.Britto etal and the results were first recognized in 1996. An electrochemical CNT filter contains electrodes and CNT in a systematic setup such that the electrodes can attract the wastes that clog the CNT based on its charges, thus resulting in high efficiency of filtering and extension of the lifetime of the CNT in the process. The electrochemical carbon nanotubes can be easily used for removing amino group based dyes from wastewater. Chen etal first reported the absorption of dyes to the CNT walls by strong covalent bonds. These electrochemical CNT can be typically used for filtering, and recycling wastewater. Currently, there are many unannounced advancements in CNT based electrochemical sensors and these are highly under research to bring its applications into biomedical systems.

== Health and safety ==
m

== See also ==
- Nanostructure
- Nanotopography
- LifeStraw
- Nanofiltration
- Tata Swach
- Slingshot (water vapor distillation system)
- Millbank bag
- Nanoremediation
- List of nanotechnology applications
- Nanomaterials
- Nanotechnology
- Ultrafiltration
- Reverse Osmosis
