= Pedro Antonio Valdés Sada =

Mexican astronomer

Pedro Antonio Valdés Sada is a Mexican astronomer, specialising in extra-solar planets (exoplanets), planetary astronomy and stellar astronomy. As of December 2015, he is associate professor and researcher at the Departamento de Física y Matemáticas at the Universidad de Monterrey.

== Education ==
Valdés Sada matriculated in 1982 as an Ingeniero Químico y de Sistemas ("Chemical and Systems Engineer") from the Instituto Tecnológico de Estudios Superiores de Monterrey, gaining a bachelor's degree in astronomy from the University of Texas in Austin in 1987. He took a master's degree in astronomy in 1990 and a doctorate in astronomy in 1993, both at New Mexico State University.

== Career ==
Valdés Sada worked as a research assistant and telescope operator at the McDonald Observatory of the University of Texas in Austin. For over five years he was a teaching assistant and researcher at New Mexico State University. Between 1993 and 1996 he was resident associate researcher at NASA's Goddard Space Center en 1993–1996. In 1997, he started as an associate teacher and researcher at the Universidad de Monterrey (UDEM).

He has a programme on the university's radio station, on the subject of the exploration of constellations and stars.

=== Research projects ===
- High-resolution infrared spectroscopy of planet Jupiter: Comparisons between Earth-based observations of hydrocarbons and those made in space.
- Polarimetric observations of regions around active sunspots – MgI.
- Photometry and astrometry of asteroids.
- Stellar occultations by planets, moons and asteroids.
- Photometry of the transits of extra-solar planets and variable stars.
- Photometry of mutual eclipsing and occultation events of binary asteroids.

=== Memberships ===
- Sociedad Mexicana de Astrobiología
- American Association of Variable Star Observers
- Planetary Society
- International Occultation Timing Association
- Astronomical Society of the Pacific
- American Astronomical Union
- International Astronomical Union
- Division of Planetary Sciences
- American Astronomical Society
- Mexican Sistema Nacional de Investigadores, Level 1.
