= 32008 Adriángalád =

Asteroid

Discovery
- Discovered by: LINEAR
- Discovery site: Lincoln Lab's ETS
- Discovery date: 29 April 2000

Designations
- Named after: Adrián Galád (Slovak astronomer)
- Alternative designations: 2000 HM_{53} · 1994 PZ_{39}
- Minor planet category: main-belt · background binary

Orbital characteristics
- Epoch 1 July 2021 (JD 2459396.5)
- Uncertainty parameter 0
- Observation arc: 29.37 yr (10,728 d)
- Aphelion: 2.6145 AU
- Perihelion: 1.7700 AU
- Semi-major axis: 2.1923 AU
- Eccentricity: 0.1926
- Orbital period (sidereal): 3.25 yr (1,186 d)
- Mean anomaly: 70.001°
- Mean motion: 0° 18^{m} 12.96^{s} / day
- Inclination: 6.3038°
- Longitude of ascending node: 221.81°
- Argument of perihelion: 144.08°
- Known satellites: 1 (D:1.62 km; P: 40.24 h)

Physical characteristics
- Mean diameter: 4.04 km (primary); 4.35 km (effective)
- Synodic rotation period: 3.0171±0.0001 h
- Geometric albedo: 0.16 (assumed); 0.24 (assumed)
- Spectral type: V (SDSS-MOC)
- Absolute magnitude (H): 14.17±0.01 (R); 14.58; 14.73±0.103

32008 Adriángalád (provisional designation 2000 HM_{53}) is a background asteroid and synchronous binary system from the inner regions of the asteroid belt, approximately 4 kilometers (2.5 miles) in diameter. It was discovered on 29 April 2000, by astronomers with the LINEAR program at Lincoln Laboratory's Experimental Test Site near Socorro, New Mexico, in the United States. The V-type asteroid has a rotation period of 3.0 hours. It was named for Slovak astronomer Adrián Galád. Its 1.6-kilometer sized minor-planet moon was discovered in August 2007.

== Orbit and classification ==
Adriángalád is a non-family asteroid of the main belt's background population when applying the hierarchical clustering method to its proper orbital elements. Based on osculating Keplerian orbital elements, the asteroid is located in the densely populated region of the Flora family (402), a giant family or clan of stony bodies in the inner asteroid belt.

It orbits the Sun in the inner main-belt at a distance of 1.8–2.6 AU once every 3 years and 3 months (1,186 days; semi-major axis of 2.19 AU). Its orbit has an eccentricity of 0.19 and an inclination of 6° with respect to the ecliptic. The body's observation arc begins almost 9 years prior to its official discovery observation, with a precovery taken by the Steward Observatory's Spacewatch survey at Kitt Peak in November 1991.

== Naming ==
This minor planet was named after Slovak astronomer Adrián Galád (born 1970) a discoverer of minor planets and several binary asteroids himself. He is well known for his photometric observations at both Ondřejov and Modra observatories. The official naming citation was published by the Minor Planet Center on 20 June 2016 (M.P.C. 100607).

== Physical characteristics ==
In the SDSS-based taxonomy, Adriángalád has been characterized as a bright V-type asteroid.

=== Rotation period ===
A rotational lightcurve of Adriángalád was obtained from photometric observations in the R-band by Czech astronomer Petr Pravec at the Ondřejov Observatory in August 2007. The lightcurve gave a well-defined rotation period of 3.0171±0.0001 hours with a brightness amplitude of 0.19 in magnitude (U=3).

=== Satellite ===
During Pravec's photometric observations it was revealed that Adriángalád is a synchronous binary system, with a minor-planet moon orbiting it every 40.24±0.02 hours. The satellite measures approximately 40% of that of its primary, with published diameters of 1.62 and 1.69 kilometers, respectively. The companion orbits its primary at an estimated average distance of 13 kilometers only.

=== Diameter and albedo estimate ===
A combined effective diameter of 4.35 kilometers for the system has been published based on secondary-to-primary diameter-ratio of 0.40, that is, 4.04 km for the primary, and 1.62 km for the secondary. The assumed albedo for the primary is 0.16. Johnston's archive uses the same ratio of 0.40 and estimates and effective diameter of 4.56 kilometers with 4.23 and 1.69 kilometers for the primary and secondary, respectively. The Collaborative Asteroid Lightcurve Link (CALL) assumes an albedo of 0.24 – derived from 8 Flora, the Flora family's largest member – and calculates a diameter of 3.07 kilometers with an absolute magnitude of 14.73.
