= The Love Song of J. Alfred Prufrock in popular culture =

T. S. Eliot's 1915 poem "The Love Song of J. Alfred Prufrock" is often referenced in popular culture.

== Film and television ==
In John Boorman's 1974 film Zardoz, the recently resurrected Eternal, Arthur Frayn, recites several lines to test the character Zed. Zed responds to the line To say: "I am Lazarus, come from the dead" with the following line "Come back to tell you all, I shall tell you all".

The poem is quoted several times, by various characters, in Francis Ford Coppola's Apocalypse Now (1979).

The film I've Heard the Mermaids Singing (1987) directed by Patricia Rozema takes its title from a line in the poem, as do the films Eat the Peach (1986), directed by Peter Ormrod, and Till Human Voices Wake Us (2002), directed by Michael Petroni.

In the Woody Allen film Midnight in Paris (2011), Gil (Owen Wilson) mentions the poem to T. S. Eliot as they get into a taxi.

The film Saturn Returns (2009) features a diegetic reading of the poem. That scene was later used in the director Lior Shamriz's derivative experimental film Return Return, which premiered at the Berlin Film Festival in 2010.

The film It Follows (2014) features a diegetic reading of three stanzas of the poem.

In the film Mike's Murder (1984), Philip Green (played by Paul Winfield) paraphrases from the poem in describing the title character, Mike Chuhutsky (played by Mark Keyloun): "He was always preparing a face to meet the faces that he met."

In the 1982 BBC TV Serial Bird of Prey, 'Prufrock' is proposed as the codename for the secret plan to murder civil servant Henry Jay (played by Richard Griffiths), suggested by his corrupt senior officer Tony Hendersly (played by Jeremy Child).

In the 2003 episode "Star Crossed", of the series Law & Order, defence attorney Dean Connors (played by Peter Gerety) quotes the line "I have measured out my life with coffee spoons" when he realizes that his small repetitive legal career has led him to being tricked by a murderess.

In the 2018 episode "Shit Show at the Fuck Factory", of the series Succession, character Frank Vernon (played by Peter Friedman) misquotes the poem, as "I am just an attendant lord, here to swell a scene or two". He references the poem once more by name in a 2019 episode, "Argestes", mentioning he likes to "recite Prufrock internally" during audits.

Meg Ryan named her production company Prufrock Pictures after the poem.

== Music ==
German folk singer Sibylle Baier references the poem in her song "Says Elliott".

Answering Eliot's query, "Do I dare to eat a peach?", The Allman Brothers Band titled their 1972 album Eat A Peach.

James McMurtry sings "I measure out my life in coffee grounds" in his song "Charlemagne's Home Town" on the 2005 album Childish Things, a variation of the verse "I have measured out my life with coffee spoons".

Frank Turner references Prufrock in the song title "I knew Prufrock before he got famous" on his 2008 album Love Ire & Song.

"Afternoons & Coffeespoons" (1993), a song by the Canadian pop rock group Crash Test Dummies, is built on references to the poem, and namedrops Eliot himself.

Sting sings in the song "Bring on the Night" on The Police 1979 album Reggatta de Blanc, "The afternoon has gently passed me by, the evening spreads itself against the sky" which evokes: "Let us go then, you and I, / When the evening is spread out against the sky".

Bo Burnham opens his song "Repeat Stuff" by saying "Let us go then, you and I, / When the evening is spread out against the sky / Like a patient etherized upon a table... T. S. Eliot"

Tori Amos sings "Heard the eternal footman / Bought himself a bike to race" in her song "Pretty Good Year."

The song by the band Mumford & Sons, "There Will Be Time", borrows its title and part of its chorus from the poem: "And indeed there will be time".

In the ninth verse of his song "Desolation Row", Bob Dylan references Eliot and Ezra Pound "fighting in the captain's tower". He alludes to the final stanza of Prufrock describing how "Between the windows of the sea where lovely mermaids flow".

The New York progressive rock band Heresy performs a forty-minute musical and video adaptation of Eliot's poem, featuring lead vocalist Tony Garone. "The Love Song of J. Alfred Prufrock" was set to music by Tony Garone and Scott Harris. The video was made by Tony Garone himself, with illustrations by Julian Peters.

In the album I am Nothing, Versus Shade Collapse has produced a musical adaptation of the poem called "An Adaptation of The Love Song of J. Alfred Prufrock."

The folk musician Peter Mulvey ends the "Notes From Elsewhere" version of his song "The Trouble With Poets" by quoting "Let us go then, you and I, / As the evening is spread out against the sky / Like a patient etherized on a table!" from the opening lines of "The Love Song of J. Alfred Prufrock".

Ska band Slow Gherkin references The Love Song of J. Alfred Prufrock in their song Shed Some Skin.

Welsh rock band Manic Street Preachers reference the poem in the song "My Guernica" on their sixth studio album, "Know Your Enemy".

The title of Hong Kong singer-songwriter Serrini’s 2018 song "Let Us Go Then You and I" is borrowed from the first line of the poem.

== Literature ==
Novels that reference the poem include The Long Goodbye (1953) by Raymond Chandler, the young-adult novel The Chocolate War (1974) by Robert Cormier, The Eternal Footman (1999, the title of which also comes from the poem) by James K. Morrow, Leviathan Wakes (2011) by James S. A. Corey, and When Beauty Tamed the Beast (2011) by Eloisa James.

Two different authors, over 20 years apart, have used the title of the poem in reference to the career of longtime FBI Director J. Edgar Hoover. The August 1972 issue of National Lampoon featured an article by Sean Kelly entitled "The Love Song of J. Edgar Hoover", which opens with "We'd better go quietly, you and I." In 1996, humourist Kinky Friedman wrote a novel entitled The Love Song of J. Edgar Hoover.

The young-adult novelists John Green and Sarah Dessen make references to the poem in their respective novels The Fault in Our Stars and Dreamland.

In the 2000 novel The Austere Academy, the Baudelaire orphans attend Prufrock Preparatory School.

In Giannina Braschi's Spanglish novel Yo-Yo Boing! (1998) a poet riffs on the line "Do I dare to eat a peach."

Stephen King quotes this poem in his 2009 novel Under the Dome.

Celeste Ng uses the poem in her 2017 novel Little Fires Everywhere.

== Asteroid ==
Asteroid 32892 Prufrock, discovered by Anlaug Kaas at the Roque de los Muchachos Observatory on La Palma in 1994, was named for the eponymous narrator of T. S. Eliot's poem. The official naming citation was published by the Minor Planet Center on 9 January 2020 (M.P.C. 120069).
