= Meanings of minor-planet names: 33001–34000 =

As minor planet discoveries are confirmed, they are given a permanent number by the IAU's Minor Planet Center (MPC), and the discoverers can then submit names for them, following the IAU's naming conventions. The list below concerns those minor planets in the specified number-range that have received names, and explains the meanings of those names.

Official naming citations of newly named small Solar System bodies are approved and published in a bulletin by IAU's Working Group for Small Bodies Nomenclature (WGSBN). Before May 2021, citations were published in MPC's Minor Planet Circulars for many decades. Recent citations can also be found on the JPL Small-Body Database (SBDB). Until his death in 2016, German astronomer Lutz D. Schmadel compiled these citations into the Dictionary of Minor Planet Names (DMP) and regularly updated the collection.

Based on Paul Herget's The Names of the Minor Planets, Schmadel also researched the unclear origin of numerous asteroids, most of which had been named prior to World War II. This article incorporates text from this source, which is in the public domain: SBDB New namings may only be added to this list below after official publication as the preannouncement of names is condemned. The WGSBN publishes a comprehensive guideline for the naming rules of non-cometary small Solar System bodies.

== 33001–33100 ==
Named minor planet	Provisional	This minor planet was named for...	Ref · Catalog
33002 Everest	1997 DM	Mount Everest (also known as Sagarmāthā in Nepal and Chomolungma in China) is the world's highest mountain. The summit is 8848 m above sea level.	JPL · 33002
33004 Dianesipiera	1997 EP	Diane M. Sipiera (born 1955), American executive director of the Planetary Studies Foundation, author, and operator of the Star-Lab Planetarium	JPL · 33004
33008 Tatematsu	1997 EU_{17}	Ken'ichi Tatematsu, professor emeritus at the National Astronomical Observatory of Japan.	IAU · 33008
33010 Enricoprosperi	1997 EO_{30}	Enrico Prosperi (born 1954), Italian astronomer and a discoverer of minor planets. Owner of the Castelmartini Observatory (160) in Tuscany, he has undertaken observing programs on many kinds of astronomical objects, including comets and minor planets since 1998. Prosperi is a member of the Italian astronomical associations UAI and SAIt.	JPL · 33010
33011 Kurtiscarsch	1997 EH_{36}	Kurtis Mickel Carsch (born 1994) is a finalist in the 2012 Intel Science Talent Search, a science competition for high-school seniors, for his chemistry project.	JPL · 33011
33012 Eddieirizarry	1997 EJ_{55}	Eddie Irizarry (born 1969), an astronomer at the Sociedad de Astronomia del Caribe.	MPC · 33012
33014 Kalinich	1997 FE_{4}	Adam Orval Kalinich (born 1994) is a finalist in the 2012 Intel Science Talent Search, a science competition for high-school seniors, for his mathematics project.	JPL · 33014
33017 Wroński	1997 GM_{41}	Józef Maria Hoene-Wroński (1776–1853), Polish mathematician and philosopher	JPL · 33017
33027 Brouillac	1997 QE	Laurent Brouillac (born 1967), a member of the Association des Utilisateurs de Détecteurs Electroniques (AUDE), has contributed to the promotion of astronomical observations using Webcams.	JPL · 33027
33031 Paolofini	1997 RX	Paolo Fini (b. 1967), an Italian engineer and an amateur astronomer.	IAU · 33031
33034 Dianadamrau	1997 RC_{11}	Diana Damrau (born 1971) is a German soprano, who is a Kammersängerin of the Bavarian State Opera. She has a very broad repertoire, but is the epitomic Queen of the night in Mozart's The Magic Flute.	JPL · 33034
33035 Pareschi	1997 SZ_{9}	Giovanni Pareschi (born 1966), Italian astronomer	JPL · 33035
33040 Pavelmayer	1997 SO_{25}	Pavel Mayer (born 1932), Czech astronomer at the Charles University in Prague	JPL · 33040
33044 Erikdavy	1997 UE	Erik Davy Rees (born 2003), grandson of the discoverer Paul G. Comba	JPL · 33044
33054 Eduardorossi	1997 UU_{14}	Eduardo Rossi (b. 1985) obtained a degree in Physics from the University of Pisa. He studied ocean acoustics, then volcanology and the dispersion of volcanic ash into the atmosphere. He is also a member of the Gruppo Astrofili Montelupo.	IAU · 33054
33056 Ogunimachi	1997 UG_{15}	Ogunimachi, Niigata prefecture, Japan, famous for its washi (Japanese paper) production	JPL · 33056
33058 Kovařík	1997 UP_{20}	Oton Kovařík (1928–2010), Czech actor, orator and painter, is now living in California with his wife Dása, also an actress. The Kovaříks have propagated European culture and helped to maintain European cultural traditions among immigrants in California, by public recitals of poems and by art exhibitions Src.	JPL · 33058
33059 Matsuoka	1997 VS	Yoshikazu Matsuoka, Japanese amateur astronomer.	IAU · 33059
33061 Václavmorava	1997 VA_{1}	Václav Morava (1933–2005) was a psychiatrist who specialized in treating children, youths and families in southern Bohemia. He was also known as a painter, graphic artist, sculptor, musician, essayist and poet. He was good, wise, helpful and never-to-be-forgotten friend.	JPL · 33061
33100 Udine	1997 YK_{9}	Udine, chief town of the Friuli district in northeast Italy. Founded by Celtic tribes and later occupied by the Romans, it grew to great influence under the Patriarchate of Aquileia in the Middle Ages. Nowadays it is renowned for its castle and excellent wines. The citation was prepared by G. Sostero.	MPC · 33100

== 33101–33200 ==
back to top

Named minor planet	Provisional	This minor planet was named for...	Ref · Catalog
33103 Pintar	1997 YA_{12}	James Anthony Pintarr (born 1947), American physicist and helioseismologist	JPL · 33103
33113 Julabeth	1998 BZ_{3}	Jula Elizabeth Rees, granddaughter of the discoverer	JPL · 33113
33117 Ashinimodi	1998 BR_{12}	Ashini A. Modi (born 2004), a finalist in the 2016 Broadcom MASTERS, a math and science competition for middle school students, for her physics project.	JPL · 33117
33118 Naiknaware	1998 BZ_{12}	Anushka Naiknaware (born 2003), a finalist in the 2016 Broadcom MASTERS, a math and science competition for middle school students, for her materials & bioengineering project.	JPL · 33118
33129 Ivankrasko	1998 CB	Ivan Krasko (né Ján Botto, 1876–1958) was a symbolist poet, founder of Slovak modernist literature, prosaist and translator from Romanian and German	JPL · 33129
33135 Davidrisoldi	1998 DX	David Risoldi (born 2012), the second grandson of one of the discoverers at Santa Lucia observatory.	JPL · 33135
33137 Strejček	1998 DO_{1}	Alfred Strejček (born 1941), a Czech actor, moderator, musician, screenwriter, narrator, reciter and professor of artistic rhetoric.	IAU · 33137
33151 Tomasobelloni	1998 DY_{11}	Tomaso Belloni (1961–2023), a prominent Italian astrophysicist.	IAU · 33151
33154 Talent	1998 DT_{15}	David L. Talent, American contractor team leader for the NEAT camera transition to the 1.2-m AMOS telescope on Haleakala	JPL · 33154
33157 Pertile	1998 DF_{20}	Tomáš Pertile (born 1933), a Czech amateur astronomer at the Johann Palisa Observatory and the Ostrava–Poruba Planetarium	JPL · 33157
33158 Rúfus	1998 DU_{23}	Milan Rúfus, Slvak poet, essayist and translator	JPL · 33158
33160 Denismukwege	1998 DW_{34}	Denis Mukwege (born 1950), a Congolese gynecologist and director of the Panzi Hospital in Bukavu which he founded in 1999.	JPL · 33160
33162 Sofiarandich	1998 DT_{35}	Sofia Randich (born 1962), Italian astrophysicist and director of the Arcetri Observatory of the National Institute for Astrophysics since 2018. Her research includes star formation, stellar structure and spectroscopy, formation and evolution of the Milky Way. She is a member of the Gaia science team and the co-lead of the "Gaia–ESO Spectroscopic Survey", using the Very Large Telescope at Cerro Paranal in Chile (Src).	IAU · 33162
33163 Alainaspect	1998 EH	Alain Aspect (born 1947) is a French physicist who performed the first conclusive test of the Einstein-Podolsky-Rosen paradox. He is a member of the French Académie des sciences, a laureate of the Holweck prize (1991), a gold medalist of the CNRS (1995), an Albert Einstein medalist (2012) and a Niels Bohr medalist (2013).	JPL · 33163
33165 Joschhambsch	1998 EO_{2}	Franz-Josef (Josch) Hambsch (born 1957) is a retired nuclear physicist, who worked for the Joint Research Centre in Geel, Belgium from 1984 to 2018. An active variable star observer, he has participated in many scientific research projects. Hambsch discovered the first white-dwarf pulsar AR Sco.	JPL · 33165
33175 Isabellegleeson	1998 FP_{5}	Isabelle Jane Pravdova Gleeson (born 2019), granddaughter of Slovak astronomer Alexander Pravda, who co-discovered this minor planet. Isabelle and her parents live in Ireland.	IAU · 33175
33179 Arsènewenger	1998 FY_{15}	Arsène Wenger, French manager, former manager of the English football team Arsenal Football Club	JPL · 33179
33181 Aalokpatwa	1998 FN_{17}	Aalok Nital Patwa (born 2002), a finalist in the 2016 Broadcom MASTERS, a math and science competition for middle school students, for his materials & bioengineering project.	JPL · 33181
33187 Pizzolato	1998 FD_{36}	Rachel Michelle Pizzolato (born 2004), a finalist in the 2016 Broadcom MASTERS, a math and science competition for middle school students, for her energy and sustainability project.	JPL · 33187
33188 Shreya	1998 FC_{43}	Shreya Ramachandran (born 2003), a finalist in the 2016 Broadcom MASTERS, a math and science competition for middle school students, for her environmental and earth sciences project.	JPL · 33188
33189 Ritzdorf	1998 FK_{43}	Lucas Lee Ritzdorf (born 2002) is a finalist in the 2016 Broadcom MASTERS, a math and science competition for middle school students, for his environmental and earth sciences project.	JPL · 33189
33190 Sigrest	1998 FV_{43}	Eleanor Wren Sigrest (born 2003), a finalist in the 2016 Broadcom MASTERS, a math and science competition for middle school students, for her electrical and mechanical engineering project.	JPL · 33190
33191 Santiagostone	1998 FW_{43}	Santiago Stone (born 2001), a finalist in the 2016 Broadcom MASTERS, a math and science competition for middle school students, for his materials & bioengineering project.	JPL · 33191
33193 Emhyr	1998 FO_{47}	Emhyr Subramanian (born 2002), a finalist in the 2016 Broadcom MASTERS, a math and science competition for middle school students, for his chemistry project.	JPL · 33193
33195 Davenyadav	1998 FO_{48}	Daven Raymond Yadav (born 2002), a finalist in the 2016 Broadcom MASTERS, a math and science competition for middle school students, for his materials & bioengineering project.	JPL · 33195
33196 Kaienyang	1998 FX_{48}	Kaien Yang (born 2002), a finalist in the 2016 Broadcom MASTERS, a math and science competition for middle school students, for his medicine and health sciences project.	JPL · 33196
33197 Charlallen	1998 FA_{52}	Charla Allen, a mentor of finalist in the 2016 Broadcom MASTERS, a math and science competition for middle school students.	JPL · 33197
33198 Mackewicz	1998 FV_{52}	Heather Mackewicz, a mentor of finalist in the 2016 Broadcom MASTERS, a math and science competition for middle school students.	JPL · 33198
33200 Carasummit	1998 FY_{53}	Cara Summit mentored a finalist in the 2016 Broadcom MASTERS, a math and science competition for middle school students. She teaches at the Canterbury School, Fort Myers, Florida.	JPL · 33200

== 33201–33300 ==
back to top

Named minor planet	Provisional	This minor planet was named for...	Ref · Catalog
33201 Thomasartiss	1998 FL_{54}	Thomas Artiss mentored a finalist in the 2016 Broadcom MASTERS, a math and science competition for middle school students. He teaches at the Harker School, San Jose, California.	JPL · 33201
33202 Davignon	1998 FY_{54}	Aimee Davignon mentored a finalist in the 2016 Broadcom MASTERS, a math and science competition for middle school students. She teaches at the Henry E. Huntington Middle School, San Marino, California.	JPL · 33202
33205 Graigmarx	1998 FH_{58}	Graig Marx mentored a finalist in the 2016 Broadcom MASTERS, a math and science competition for middle school students. He teaches at the Winchester Thurston School, Pittsburgh, Pennsylvania.	JPL · 33205
33210 Johnrobertson	1998 FC_{70}	John Robertson mentored a finalist in the 2016 Broadcom MASTERS, a math and science competition for middle school students. He teaches at the Alcott Elementary School, Riverside, California.	JPL · 33210
33213 Diggs	1998 FB_{80}	Katherine Diggs mentored a finalist in the 2016 Broadcom MASTERS, a math and science competition for middle school students. She teaches at the St. Joseph School Fullerton, Baltimore, Maryland.	JPL · 33213
33215 Garyjones	1998 FU_{90}	Gary Jones mentored a finalist in the 2016 Broadcom MASTERS, a math and science competition for middle school students. He teaches at the Westminster Schools, Atlanta, Georgia.	JPL · 33215
33217 Bonnybasu	1998 FJ_{97}	Bonny Basu mentored a finalist in the 2016 Broadcom MASTERS, a math and science competition for middle school students. She teaches at the Challenger School, Shawnee, San Jose, California.	JPL · 33217
33219 De Los Santos	1998 FN_{107}	Tomas De Los Santos mentored a finalist in the 2016 Broadcom MASTERS, a math and science competition for middle school students. He teaches at the Santa Gertrudis School, Kingsville, Texas.	JPL · 33219
33221 Raqueljacobson	1998 FS_{111}	Raquel Jacobson-Peregrino mentored a finalist in the 2016 Broadcom MASTERS, a math and science competition for middle school students. She teaches at the Boston Latin School, Boston, Massachusetts.	JPL · 33221
33222 Gillingham	1998 FG_{112}	David Gillingham mentored a finalist in the 2016 Broadcom MASTERS, a math and science competition for middle school students. He teaches at the High Tech Middle, San Diego, California.	JPL · 33222
33224 Lesrogers	1998 FG_{114}	Les Rogers mentored a finalist in the 2016 Broadcom MASTERS, a math and science competition for middle school students. He teaches at the Saint Edward's School, Vero Beach, Florida.	JPL · 33224
33226 Melissamacko	1998 FW_{121}	Melissa Macko mentored a finalist in the 2016 Broadcom MASTERS, a math and science competition for middle school students. She teaches at the Aventura Waterways K-8 Center, Miami, Florida.	JPL · 33226
33230 Libbyrobertson	1998 FC_{128}	Libby Robertson mentored a finalist in the 2016 Broadcom MASTERS, a math and science competition for middle school students. She teaches at the Franklin Fine Arts Center, Chicago, Illinois.	JPL · 33230
33241 Jeanmedas	1998 HX_{5}	Jean Medas (1921-1999) was a French optician and survivor of the Mittelbau-Dora concentration camp. After the war, he opened an astronomical instrument company, becoming influential in amateur astronomy.	IAU · 33241
33247 Iannacone	1998 HO_{18}	Kelli Iannacone mentored a finalist in the 2016 Broadcom MASTERS, a math and science competition for middle school students. She teaches at the Timberlane Middle School, Pennington, New Jersey.	JPL · 33247
33248 Nataliehowell	1998 HY_{18}	Natalie Howell mentored a finalist in the 2016 Broadcom MASTERS, a math and science competition for middle school students. She teaches at the Caddo Middle Magnet, Shreveport, Louisiana.	JPL · 33248
33249 Pamelasvenson	1998 HE_{22}	Pamela Svenson mentored a finalist in the 2016 Broadcom MASTERS, a math and science competition for middle school students. She teaches at the Stoller Middle School, Portland, Oregon.	JPL · 33249
33251 Marcvandenbroeck	1998 HS_{24}	Marc Van den Broeck (born 1969), Belgian amateur astronomer and former director of Urania, a public observatory.	JPL · 33251
33254 Sundaresakumar	1998 HE_{30}	Preethi Sundaresakumar mentored a finalist in the 2016 Broadcom MASTERS, a math and science competition for middle school students. She teaches at the Stratford Middle School, San Jose, California.	JPL · 33254
33255 Kathybush	1998 HB_{32}	Kathy Bush mentored a finalist in the 2016 Broadcom MASTERS, a math and science competition for middle school students. She teaches at the John Curtis Christian School, River Ridge, Louisiana.	JPL · 33255
33258 Femariebustos	1998 HX_{38}	Fe Marie Bustos mentored a finalist in the 2016 Broadcom MASTERS, a math and science competition for middle school students. She teaches at the Stratford Middle School, Fremont, California.	JPL · 33258
33261 Ginagarlie	1998 HQ_{45}	Gina Garlie mentored a finalist in the 2016 Broadcom MASTERS, a math and science competition for middle school students. She teaches at the Kalispell Middle School, Kalispell, Montana.	JPL · 33261
33262 Marklewis	1998 HK_{51}	Mark Lewis, American professor of computer science at Trinity University in San Antonio, Texas. His work includes simulation of planetary ring systems, particularly those of Saturn.	IAU · 33262
33263 Willhutch	1998 HP_{53}	William Hutchinson mentored a finalist in the 2016 Broadcom MASTERS, a math and science competition for middle school students. He teaches at the Louise A. Benton Middle School, Manassas, Virginia.	JPL · 33263
33264 Maryrogers	1998 HM_{56}	Mary Rogers mentored a finalist in the 2016 Broadcom MASTERS, a math and science competition for middle school students. She teaches at St. John the Evangelist, Severna Park, Maryland.	JPL · 33264
33269 Broccoli	1998 HC_{95}	JoMarie Broccoli mentored a finalist in the 2016 Broadcom MASTERS, a math and science competition for middle school students. She teaches at the Nysmith School for the Gifted and Talented, Herndon, Virginia.	JPL · 33269
33270 Katiecrysup	1998 HJ_{99}	Kathrine Crysup-Sikes mentored a finalist in the 2016 Broadcom MASTERS, a math and science competition for middle school students. She teaches at the Seashore Middle Academy, Corpus Christi, Texas.	JPL · 33270
33274 Beaubingham	1998 HT_{105}	Beau Taylor Bingham (born 1999) was a finalist in the 2017 Regeneron STS, and was awarded 2nd place at the 2016 ISEF for his medicine and health project. He attends the Cascia Hall Preparatory School, Tulsa, Oklahoma.	JPL · 33274
33282 Arjunramani	1998 HZ_{129}	Arjun Srinivasan Ramani (born 1998) was a finalist in the 2017 Regeneron STS, and was awarded 2nd place at the 2016 ISEF for his computer science project. He attends the West Lafayette Junior-Senior High School, West Lafayette, Indiana.	JPL · 33282
33285 Martínleiva	1998 JR_{2}	Alejandro Martín Leiva (born 1971), associate professor at the Astronomical Observatory of Córdoba	IAU · 33285
33287 Lasue	1998 KE_{1}	Jérémie Lasue (born 1979), French astronomer at the Observatoire Midi-Pyrénées	IAU · 33287
33288 Shixian	1998 KL_{4}	Xian Shi (born 1983) of the Max-Planck Institute (Göttingen) analyzed image data of comet 67P/Churyumov-Gerasimenko taken by the OSIRIS camera system of the Rosetta mission to discover sunset and sunrise jets as well as the ejection of meter-size boulders by the local gas flow on the comet.	IAU · 33288
33290 Carloszuluaga	1998 KZ_{7}	Carlos A. Zuluaga (born 1982) is a Senior Research Support Associate at the Massachusetts Institute of Technology (Cambridge, MA). His work includes photometry and astrometry of Pluto and other trans-Neptunian bodies, particularly to predict and analyze stellar occultation observations.	IAU · 33290
33296 Jennylarson	1998 KN_{42}	Jennifer Larson (born 1993), American planetary scientist and Ph.D. recipient from the University of Central Florida	IAU · 33296

== 33301–33400 ==
back to top

Named minor planet	Provisional	This minor planet was named for...	Ref · Catalog
33319 Kunqu	1998 MJ_{41}	Kunqu, one of the oldest forms of Chinese theater (opera), evolved from a melody, Kumshan diao, from the city of Kumshan.	JPL · 33319
33323 Lucaspaganini	1998 QN_{53}	Lucas Paganini (b. 1980) is an Argentinian-American astronomer. He is an expert on molecular spectroscopy, planetary science and instrumentation, leading the development of submillimeter-wave instruments and the development of mission goals and requirements of several NASA/ESA space missions.	IAU · 33323
33328 Archanaverma	1998 RV_{41}	Archana Verma (born 1999) was a finalist in the 2017 Regeneron STS, and was awarded 1st place at the 2016 ISEF for her chemistry project. She attends the Jericho Senior High School, Jericho, New York.	JPL · 33328
33329 Stefanwan	1998 RY_{77}	Stefan Wan (born 1999) was a finalist in the 2017 Regeneron STS, and was awarded 2nd place at the 2016 ISEF for his engineering project. He attends the Alexander W. Dreyfoos Jr. School of the Arts, West Palm Beach, Florida.	JPL · 33329
33330 Barèges	1998 SW	Barèges, France, at the foot of the Pic du Midi	JPL · 33330
33334 Turon	1998 VM_{4}	Catherine Turon (born 1944), a French astrometrist	JPL · 33334
33335 Guibert	1998 VQ_{4}	Jean Guibert (born 1937), a French astronomer.	JPL · 33335
33337 Amberyang	1998 VA_{11}	Amber Zoe Yang (born 1999) was a finalist in the 2017 Regeneron STS, and was awarded 2nd place at the 2016 ISEF for her space science project. She attends the Trinity Preparatory School, Winter Park, Florida.	JPL · 33337
33343 Madorobin	1998 XT_{10}	Mado Robin (1918–1960) was a French coloratura soprano, noted for her extreme vocal range.	JPL · 33343
33344 Madymesple	1998 XN_{13}	Mady Mesplé (born 1931) was the leading French soprano between the 1950s and 1970s. She played Lakmé 145 times. She is one of the great dames of French opera.	JPL · 33344
33345 Nataliedessay	1998 XC_{14}	Natalie Dessay (born 1965) is a French soprano and actress	JPL · 33345
33346 Sabinedevieilhe	1998 XD_{14}	Sabine Devieilhe (born 1985) is a rising French soprano. She graduated with a first prize of the Conservatoire national supérieur de musique et de danse de Paris in 2011, and triumphed in Lakmé at the Opéra-comique in 2014.	JPL · 33346
33347 Maryzhu	1998 XJ_{35}	Mary Zhu (born 1998) was a finalist in the 2017 Regeneron STS, and was awarded 2nd place at the 2016 ISEF for her behavioral and social sciences project. She attended the Nashua High School South, Nashua, New Hampshire and now attends Stanford University in Stanford, CA.	JPL · 33347
33348 Stevelliott	1998 XO_{39}	Steven Thomas Elliott (born 1998) was a finalist in the 2017 Regeneron STS, and was awarded 2nd place at the 2016 ISEF for his engineering project. He is homeschooled at the Magnolia Academy, Parker, Texas.	JPL · 33348
33353 Chattopadhyay	1998 XU_{95}	Sambuddha Chattopadhyay (born 1999), a finalist in the 2017 Regeneron Science Talent Search, a science competition for high school seniors, for his physics project	JPL · 33353
33372 Jonathanchung	1999 BP_{23}	Jonathan H Chung (born 1999), a finalist in the 2017 Regeneron Science Talent Search, a science competition for high school seniors, for his cellular and molecular biology project.	JPL · 33372
33376 Medi	1999 CZ_{8}	Enrico Medi (1911–1974), Italian physicist who was director of the National Institute of Geophysics and vice president of the European Atomic Energy Community.	JPL · 33376
33377 Večerníček	1999 CR_{9}	Večerníček, Czech television animated figure	JPL · 33377
33379 Rohandalvi	1999 CX_{23}	Rohan Dalvi (born 1999) is a finalist in the 2017 Regeneron Science Talent Search, a science competition for high school seniors, for his chemistry project.	JPL · 33379
33382 Indranidas	1999 CE_{33}	Indrani Das (born 1999), a finalist in the 2017 Regeneron Science Talent Search, a science competition for high school seniors, for her medicine and health project.	JPL · 33382
33383 Edupuganti	1999 CV_{36}	Vineet Edupuganti (born 1999), a finalist in the 2017 Regeneron Science Talent Search, a science competition for high school seniors, for his engineering project.	JPL · 33383
33384 Jacyfang	1999 CV_{42}	Jacy Fang (born 1999), a finalist in the 2017 Regeneron Science Talent Search, a science competition for high school seniors, for her medicine and health project.	JPL · 33384
33389 Isairisgreco	1999 CZ_{50}	Isabella Iris Greco (born 1999), a finalist in the 2017 Regeneron Science Talent Search, a science competition for high school seniors, for her behavioral and social sciences project.	JPL · 33389
33390 Hajlasz	1999 CJ_{51}	Natalia Hajlasz (born 2000), a finalist in the 2017 Regeneron Science Talent Search, a science competition for high school seniors, for her chemistry project.	JPL · 33390
33392 Blakehord	1999 CH_{54}	Blake Hord (born 1999), a finalist in the 2017 Regeneron Science Talent Search, a science competition for high school seniors, for his space science project.	JPL · 33392
33393 Khandelwal	1999 CL_{54}	Apoorv Khandelwal (born 1999), a finalist in the 2017 Regeneron Science Talent Search, a science competition for high school seniors, for his materials science project.	JPL · 33393
33394 Nathaniellee	1999 CR_{54}	Nathaniel Paul Lee (born 1999), a finalist in the 2017 Regeneron Science Talent Search, a science competition for high school seniors, for his physics project.	JPL · 33394
33395 Dylanli	1999 CU_{54}	Dylan Li (born 1999), a finalist in the 2017 Regeneron Science Talent Search, a science competition for high school seniors, for his medicine and health project.	JPL · 33395
33396 Vrindamadan	1999 CU_{56}	Vrinda Madan (born 1999), a finalist in the 2017 Regeneron Science Talent Search, a science competition for high school seniors, for her cellular and molecular biology project.	JPL · 33396
33397 Prathiknaidu	1999 CG_{57}	Prathik Naidu (born 1999), a finalist in the 2017 Regeneron Science Talent Search, a science competition for high school seniors, for his computational biology and bioinformatics project.	JPL · 33397
33399 Emilyann	1999 CC_{59}	Emily Ann Peterson (born 1999), a finalist in the 2017 Regeneron Science Talent Search, a science competition for high school seniors, for her cellular and molecular biology project.	JPL · 33399
33400 Laurapierson	1999 CJ_{59}	Laura Catherine Pierson (born 1999) is a finalist in the 2017 Regeneron Science Talent Search, a science competition for high school seniors, for her mathematics project. She attends the College Preparatory School, Oakland, California.	JPL · 33400

== 33401–33500 ==
back to top

Named minor planet	Provisional	This minor planet was named for...	Ref · Catalog
33401 Radiya-Dixit	1999 CC_{68}	Evani Radiya-Dixit (born 1999) is a finalist in the 2017 Regeneron Science Talent Search, a science competition for high school seniors, for her computational biology and bioinformatics project. She attends the Harker School, San Jose, California.	JPL · 33401
33402 Canizares	1999 CC_{71}	Claude R. Canizares (born 1945) is a renowned physicist, the Bruno Rossi Professor of Physics at MIT, associate director of the Chandra X-ray Observatory, and former director of MIT's Center for Space Research.	JPL · 33402
33405 Rekhtman	1999 CW_{73}	David Boris Rekhtman (born 1998) is a finalist in the 2017 Regeneron Science Talent Search, a science competition for high school seniors, for his medicine and health project. He attends the Walt Whitman High School, Bethesda, Maryland.	JPL · 33405
33406 Saltzman	1999 CM_{74}	Audrey Saltzman (born 1999) is a finalist in the 2017 Regeneron Science Talent Search, a science competition for high school seniors, for her space science project. She attends the Byram Hills High School, Armonk, New York.	JPL · 33406
33408 Mananshah	1999 CW_{76}	Manan Ajay Shah (born 1999) is a finalist in the 2017 Regeneron Science Talent Search, a science competition for high school seniors, for his computational biology and bioinformatics project. He attends the Harker School, San Jose, California.	JPL · 33408
33412 Arjunsubra	1999 CX_{96}	Arjun Subramaniam (born 1999) is a finalist in the 2017 Regeneron Science Talent Search, a science competition for high school seniors, for his computational biology and bioinformatics project. He attends the Harker School, San Jose, California.	JPL · 33412
33413 Alecsun	1999 CP_{99}	Alec Sun (born 1998) is a finalist in the 2017 Regeneron Science Talent Search, a science competition for high school seniors, for his mathematics project. He attends the Phillips Exeter Academy, Exeter, New Hampshire.	JPL · 33413
33414 Jessicatian	1999 CP_{100}	Jessica C Tian (born 1999) is a finalist in the 2017 Regeneron Science Talent Search, a science competition for high school seniors, for her chemistry project. She attends the Del Norte High School, San Diego, California.	JPL · 33414
33415 Felixwang	1999 CB_{101}	Felix Wang (born 1998) is a finalist in the 2017 Regeneron Science Talent Search, a science competition for high school seniors, for his mathematics project. He attends the Roxbury Latin School, West Roxbury, Massachusetts.	JPL · 33415
33418 Jacksonweaver	1999 CJ_{106}	Jackson Barker Weaver (born 1999) is a finalist in the 2017 Regeneron Science Talent Search, a science competition for high school seniors, for his biochemistry project. He attends the Dr. Ronald E. McNair Academic High School, Jersey City, New Jersey.	JPL · 33418
33419 Wellman	1999 CD_{112}	Julian Wellman (born 1998) is a finalist in the 2017 Regeneron Science Talent Search, a science competition for high school seniors, for his mathematics project. He attends the Greenhills School, Ann Arbor, Michigan.	JPL · 33419
33420 Derekwoo	1999 CT_{116}	Derek Woo (born 1999) is a finalist in the 2017 Regeneron Science Talent Search, a science competition for high school seniors, for his environmental science project. He attends the Greenwich High School, Greenwich, Connecticut.	JPL · 33420
33421 Byronxu	1999 CN_{118}	Byron Lee Xu (born 1999) is a finalist in the 2017 Regeneron Science Talent Search, a science competition for high school seniors, for his earth and planetary project. He attends the William P. Clements High School, Sugar Land, Texas.	JPL · 33421
33433 Maurilia	1999 EZ_{4}	Maurilia Sposetti, sister of the discoverer †	MPC · 33433
33434 Scottmanley	1999 FU	Scott Manley (born 1972) is a popular science communicator, best known for his videos on YouTube combining science and games. A software engineer trained as an astrophysicist, he created visualizations of the asteroid belt and near-Earth asteroids.	JPL · 33434
33437 Ordenovic	1999 FK_{9}	Christophe Ordenovic (b. 1969), a French software engineer at Observatoire de la Côte d'Azur, France	IAU · 33437
33438 Mauriziopajola	1999 FE_{10}	Maurizio Pajola (b. 1986), an Italian planetary scientist at the Astronomical Observatory of Padova.	IAU · 33438
33440 Nicholasprato	1999 FR_{18}	Nicholas Prato (born 1952) is an artist/craftsman who is a science, space and astronomy enthusiast and supporter. He has worked on the reduction of infrared spectra taken at the Keck II telescope.	JPL · 33440
33441 Catherineprato	1999 FT_{18}	Catherine Coulacos Prato (born 1957) is a writer, editor, and supporter of women and other underrepresented groups in science and academia.	JPL · 33441
33442 Cassandrarunyon	1999 FW_{18}	Cassandra Runyon (b. 1960), an American professor of Geology at the College of Charleston (Charleston, South Carolina)	IAU · 33442
33443 Schambeau	1999 FZ_{18}	Charles A. Schambeau (b. 1984), an American planetary scientist who earned his Ph.D. at the University of Central Florida.	IAU · 33443
33444 Shaddad	1999 FF_{19}	Muawia Hamid Shaddad (b. 1952), a Sudanese astronomer at Khartoum University in Sudan	IAU · 33444
33446 Michaelyang	1999 FU_{23}	Michael Yang (born 1998) is a finalist in the 2017 Regeneron Science Talent Search, a science competition for high school seniors, for his computational biology and bioinformatics project. He attends the Charlotte Latin School, Charlotte, North Carolina.	JPL · 33446
33448 Aaronyeiser	1999 FT_{24}	Aaron Joseph Yeiser (born 1998) is a finalist in the 2017 Regeneron Science Talent Search, a science competition for high school seniors, for his mathematics project. He attends the Perkiomen Valley High School, Collegeville, Pennsylvania.	JPL · 33448
33450 Allender	1999 FO_{25}	Kate Allender mentored a finalist in the 2017 Regeneron Science Talent Search, a science competition for high school seniors. She teaches at the Tesla STEM High School, Redmond, Washington.	JPL · 33450
33451 Michaelarney	1999 FL_{26}	Michael Arney mentored a finalist in the 2017 Regeneron Science Talent Search, a science competition for high school seniors. He teaches at the Trinity Preparatory School, Winter Park, Florida.	JPL · 33451
33452 Olivebryan	1999 FU_{26}	Olive Bryan mentored a finalist in the 2017 Regeneron Science Talent Search, a science competition for high school seniors. She teaches at the Alexander W. Dreyfoos Jr. School of the Arts, West Palm Beach, Florida.	JPL · 33452
33453 Townley	1999 FG_{27}	Townley Chisholm mentored a finalist in the 2017 Regeneron Science Talent Search, a science competition for high school seniors. He teaches at the Phillips Exeter Academy, Exeter, New Hampshire.	JPL · 33453
33454 Neilclaffey	1999 FJ_{27}	Neil Claffey mentored a finalist in the 2017 Regeneron Science Talent Search, a science competition for high school seniors. He teaches at the Nashua High School South, Nashua, New Hampshire.	JPL · 33454
33455 Coakley	1999 FV_{27}	Jack Coakley mentored a finalist in the 2017 Regeneron Science Talent Search, a science competition for high school seniors. He teaches at the College Preparatory School, Oakland, California.	JPL · 33455
33456 Ericacurran	1999 FG_{28}	Erica Curran mentored a finalist in the 2017 Regeneron Science Talent Search, a science competition for high school seniors. She teaches at the Dobbs Ferry High School, Dobbs Ferry, New York.	JPL · 33456
33457 Cutillo	1999 FP_{28}	Mary Cutillo mentored a finalist in the 2017 Regeneron Science Talent Search, a science competition for high school seniors. She teaches at the Perkiomen Valley High School, Collegeville, Pennsylvania.	JPL · 33457
33458 Fialkow	1999 FE_{29}	Joshua Fialkow mentored a finalist in the 2017 Regeneron Science Talent Search, a science competition for high school seniors. He teaches at the Bronx High School of Science, Bronx, New York.	JPL · 33458
33462 Tophergee	1999 FT_{31}	Topher Gee mentored a finalist in the 2017 Regeneron Science Talent Search, a science competition for high school seniors. He teaches at the Charlotte Latin School, Charlotte, North Carolina.	JPL · 33462
33463 Bettinagregg	1999 FM_{32}	Bettina Gregg mentored a finalist in the 2017 Regeneron Science Talent Search, a science competition for high school seniors. She teaches at the Oregon Episcopal School, Portland, Oregon.	JPL · 33463
33464 Melahudock	1999 FN_{32}	Melanie L. Hudock mentored a finalist in the 2017 Regeneron Science Talent Search, a science competition for high school seniors. She teaches at the Walt Whitman High School, Bethesda, Maryland.	JPL · 33464
33466 Thomaslarson	1999 FE_{33}	Thomas G. Larson mentored a finalist in the 2017 Regeneron Science Talent Search, a science competition for high school seniors. He teaches at the Thomas Jefferson High School for Science and Technology, Alexandria, Virginia.	JPL · 33466
33467 Johnlieb	1999 FG_{35}	John Michael Lieb mentored a finalist in the 2017 Regeneron Science Talent Search, a science competition for high school seniors. He teaches at the Roxbury Latin School, West Roxbury, Massachusetts.	JPL · 33467
33468 Nelsoneric	1999 FD_{36}	Eric R. Nelson mentored a finalist in the 2017 Regeneron Science Talent Search, a science competition for high school seniors. He teaches at the Harker School, San Jose, California.	JPL · 33468
33471 Ozuna	1999 FV_{38}	Kenneth Ozuna mentored a finalist in the 2017 Regeneron Science Talent Search, a science competition for high school seniors. He teaches at the Del Norte High School, San Diego, California.	JPL · 33471
33472 Yunorperalta	1999 FN_{42}	Yunor Peralta mentored a finalist in the 2017 Regeneron Science Talent Search, a science competition for high school seniors. He teaches at the Mission San Jose High School, Fremont, California.	JPL · 33472
33473 Porterfield	1999 FZ_{45}	Pam Porterfield mentored a finalist in the 2017 Regeneron Science Talent Search, a science competition for high school seniors. She teaches at the West Lafayette Junior-Senior High School, West Lafayette, Indiana.	JPL · 33473
33476 Gilanareiss	1999 FV_{54}	Gilana Reiss mentored a finalist in the 2017 Regeneron Science Talent Search, a science competition for high school seniors. She teaches at the Hunter College High School, New York, New York.	JPL · 33476
33478 Deniselivon	1999 GB	Denise Selivon, Brazilian biologist and professor at the University of São Paulo	JPL · 33478
33480 Bartolucci	1999 GA_{1}	Osvaldo Bartolucci, Italian director of the Osservatorio Astronomico di Alpette	JPL · 33480
33484 Nathanroth	1999 GS_{7}	Nathan Roth (b. 1988), an American research scientist working in the Astrochemistry Laboratory at NASA Goddard.	IAU · 33484
33486 Edreynolds	1999 GN_{8}	Ed Reynolds (b. 1962), an American engineer who works at the Johns Hopkins Applied Physics Laboratory.	IAU · 33486
33487 Jeanpierrerivet	1999 GS_{8}	Jean-Pierre Rivet (b. 1964), a French astronomer at the Observatoire de la Côte d'Azur.	IAU · 33487
33488 Darrelrobertson	1999 GD_{9}	Darrel Kim Robertson (b. 1974) , an American research engineer at NASA Ames Research Center.	IAU · 33488
33489 Myungjinkim	1999 GF_{9}	Myung-Jin Kim (born 1978) is a senior research scientist at the Korea Astronomy and Space Science Institute. His research includes the photometric characterization of asteroids, involvement in the Hayabusa2 mission to asteroid (162173) Ryugu, and contributions to the large-scale KMTNet and OWL-Net surveys.	IAU · 33489
33490 Roggemans	1999 GK_{9}	Paul Roggemans (b. 1958), a Belgian amateur astronomer and meteor observer who cofounded the International Meteor Organization.	IAU · 33490
33491 Tonyroman	1999 GM_{9}	Anthony (Tony) Roman (b. 1969), an American branch manager at the Space Telescope Science Institute	IAU · 33491
33492 Christirogers	1999 GT_{17}	Christine Rogers mentored a finalist in the 2017 Regeneron Science Talent Search, a science competition for high school seniors. She teaches at the Hendrick Hudson High School, Montrose, New York.	JPL · 33492
33495 Schaferjames	1999 GL_{18}	James R. Schafer mentored a finalist in the 2017 Regeneron Science Talent Search, a science competition for high school seniors. He teaches at the Montgomery Blair High School, Silver Spring, Maryland.	JPL · 33495
33498 Juliesmith	1999 GG_{19}	Julie Smith mentored a finalist in the 2017 Regeneron Science Talent Search, a science competition for high school seniors. She teaches at the Greenhills School, Ann Arbor, Michigan.	JPL · 33498
33499 Stanton	1999 GN_{19}	Jeremy Stanton mentored a finalist in the 2017 Regeneron Science Talent Search, a science competition for high school seniors. He teaches at the Dr. Ronald E. McNair Academic High School, Jersey City, New Jersey.	JPL · 33499

== 33501–33600 ==
back to top

Named minor planet	Provisional	This minor planet was named for...	Ref · Catalog
33501 Juliethompson	1999 GJ_{20}	Julie Thompson mentored a finalist in the 2017 Regeneron Science Talent Search, a science competition for high school seniors. She teaches at the William P. Clements High School, Sugar Land, Texas.	JPL · 33501
33502 Janetwaldeck	1999 GM_{20}	Janet Waldeck mentored a finalist in the 2017 Regeneron Science Talent Search, a science competition for high school seniors. She teaches at the Taylor Allderdice High School, Pittsburgh, Pennsylvania.	JPL · 33502
33503 Dasilvaborges	1999 GS_{20}	Luiz Fernando da Silva Borges (born 1998) was awarded best of category and first place in the 2016 Intel International Science and Engineering Fair for his biomedical engineering project. He also received the Philip V. Streich Memorial Award.	JPL · 33503
33504 Rebrouwer	1999 GT_{20}	Rachel Elizabeth Brouwer (born 2002) was awarded second place in the 2016 Intel International Science and Engineering Fair for her earth and environmental sciences project.	JPL · 33504
33508 Drewnik	1999 GH_{25}	Dennis Adrian Drewnik (born 1998) was awarded best of category and first place in the 2016 Intel International Science and Engineering Fair for his plant sciences project. He also received the Dudley R. Herschbach SIYSS Award	JPL · 33508
33509 Mogilny	1999 GB_{27}	Daniel Mogilny (born 1998) was awarded second place in the 2016 Intel International Science and Engineering Fair for his systems software project.	JPL · 33509
33511 Austinwang	1999 GW_{32}	Han Jie (Austin) Wang (born 1998) was awarded best of category and first place in the 2016 Intel International Science and Engineering Fair for his microbiology project. He also received the Gordon E. Moore Award.	JPL · 33511
33514 Changpeihsuan	1999 GF_{34}	Chang Pei-Hsuan (born 1998) was awarded best of category and first place in the 2016 Intel International Science and Engineering Fair for her math project. She also received the European Union Contest for Young Scientists Award.	JPL · 33514
33515 Linbohan	1999 GM_{34}	Lin Bo-Han (born 1998) was awarded second place in the 2016 Intel International Science and Engineering Fair for his physics and astronomy project.	JPL · 33515
33516 Timonen	1999 GO_{34}	Petteri Timonen (born 1997) was awarded second place in the 2016 Intel International Science and Engineering Fair for his systems software project.	JPL · 33516
33517 Paulfoltin	1999 GT_{34}	Paul Foltin (born 1999) was awarded second place in the 2016 Intel International Science and Engineering Fair for his embedded systems team project. He attends the Franz-Haniel-Gymnasium, Duisburg, Germany.	JPL · 33517
33518 Stoetzer	1999 GH_{35}	Myrijam Stoetzer (born 2001) was awarded second place in the 2016 Intel International Science and Engineering Fair for her embedded systems team project. She attends the Franz-Haniel-Gymnasium, Duisburg, Germany.	JPL · 33518
33520 Ichige	1999 GE_{38}	Takahiro Ichige (born 1998) was awarded best of category and first place in the 2016 Intel International Science and Engineering Fair for his engineering mechanics project. He attends the Chiba Municipal High School, Chiba-City, Chiba-pref., Japan.	JPL · 33520
33522 Chizumimaeta	1999 GQ_{40}	Chizumi Maeta (born 1997) was awarded second place in the 2016 Intel International Science and Engineering Fair for her energy team project. She attends the Yonago National College of Technology, Yonago-City, Tottori-pref., Japan.	JPL · 33522
33523 Warashina	1999 GT_{41}	Tomoro Warashina (born 1997) was awarded second place in the 2016 Intel International Science and Engineering Fair for his cellular and molecular biology project. He attends the Yokohama Science Frontier High School, Yokohama-City, Kanagawa-pref., Japan.	JPL · 33523
33524 Rousselot	1999 GM_{48}	Philippe Rousselot (b. 1967), a French professor at the Besançon Observatory in France.	IAU · 33524
33525 Teresinha	1999 GG_{53}	Teresinha Rodrigues (born 1957) is a researcher at the Observatorio Nacional in Rio de Janeiro (Brazil). She played a fundamental role in the implementation of outreach programs at the Observatorio Astronomico do Sertão de Itaparica (Brazil) dedicated to the study of small Solar System bodies.	IAU · 33525
33528 Jinzeman	1999 HL	Jindřich Zeman, Czech amateur astronomer, winner of the František Nušl Award of the Czech Astronomical Society in 1942	JPL · 33528
33529 Henden	1999 HA_{1}	Arne A. Henden, American astronomer, co-author of Astronomical Photometry, director of the American Association of Variable Star Observers (AAVSO)	JPL · 33529
33532 Gabriellacoli	1999 HV_{2}	Gabriella Coli, Italian elementary school teacher of the first discoverer	JPL · 33532
33534 Meiyamamura	1999 HL_{9}	Mei Yamamura (born 1998) was awarded second place in the 2016 Intel International Science and Engineering Fair for her energy team project. She attends the Yonago National College of Technology, Yonago-city, Tottori-pref., Japan.	JPL · 33534
33535 Alshaikh	1999 HS_{9}	Fatimah Abdulmonem Alshaikh (born 1998) was awarded second place in the 2016 Intel International Science and Engineering Fair for her plant sciences project. She attends the Al Faisaliah Islamic Schools, Khobar, Saudi Arabia.	JPL · 33535
33536 Charpugdee	1999 HU_{9}	Runglawan Charpugdee (born 1998) was awarded second place in the 2016 Intel International Science and Engineering Fair for her animal sciences team project. She attends the Damrongratsongkroh School, Chiang Rai, Thailand.	JPL · 33536
33537 Doungnga	1999 HJ_{10}	Charuntorn Doungnga (born 1998) was awarded second place in the 2016 Intel International Science and Engineering Fair for her animal sciences team project. She attends the Damrongratsongkroh School, Chiang Rai, Thailand.	JPL · 33537
33538 Jaredbergen	1999 HR_{10}	Jared Randolph Bergen (born 1998) was awarded second place in the 2016 Intel International Science and Engineering Fair for his animal sciences project. He attends the Sayville High School, West Sayville, New York, U.S.A.	JPL · 33538
33539 Elenaberman	1999 HU_{10}	Elena Alexandra Berman (born 1999) was awarded second place in the 2016 Intel International Science and Engineering Fair for her computational biology and bioinformatics team project. She attends the Breck School, Golden Valley, Minnesota, U.S.A.	JPL · 33539
33544 Jerold	1999 JY_{8}	Jerold Z. Kaplan, American physician, surgeon, and amateur astronomer	JPL · 33544
33550 Blackburn	1999 JQ_{14}	Lee Blackburn (born 1998) was awarded second place in the 2016 Intel International Science and Engineering Fair for his energy project. He attends the Lawrence High School, Cedarhurst, New York, U.S.A.	JPL · 33550
33553 Nagai	1999 JQ_{17}	Nagai, Yamagata prefecture, Japan, where a meteorite fell in 1922	JPL · 33553
33555 Nataliebush	1999 JV_{19}	Natalie Marie Bush (born 1998) was awarded best of category and first place in the 2016 Intel International Science and Engineering Fair for her earth and environmental sciences project. She also received the Intel and Indo-US Science & Technology Forum Award. She attends the Saint Josephs Academy, Baton Rouge, Louisiana, U.S.A.	JPL · 33555
33556 Brennanclark	1999 JR_{20}	Brennan Scott Clark (born 1997) was awarded best of category and first place in the 2016 Intel International Science and Engineering Fair for his translational medical science team project. He attends the Breck School, Golden Valley, Minnesota, U.S.A.	JPL · 33556
33559 Laurencooper	1999 JK_{23}	Lauren Cooper (born 1999) was awarded second place in the 2016 Intel International Science and Engineering Fair for her materials science project. She attends the Lake Oswego High School, Lake Oswego, Oregon, U.S.A.	JPL · 33559
33560 D'Alessandro	1999 JN_{23}	Alexis Maria D´Alessandro (born 1997) was awarded second place in the 2016 Intel International Science and Engineering Fair for her environmental engineering project. She attends the Half Hollow Hills High School West, Dix Hills, New York, U.S.A.	JPL · 33560
33561 Brianjasondu	1999 JA_{24}	Brian Jason Du (born 1998) was awarded second place in the 2016 Intel International Science and Engineering Fair for his cellular and molecular biology project. He attends the Plano West Senior High School, Plano, Texas, U.S.A.	JPL · 33561
33562 Amydunphy	1999 JO_{24}	Amy Dunphy (born 2000) was awarded second place in the 2016 Intel International Science and Engineering Fair for her chemistry project. She attends the Harker School, San Jose, California, U.S.A.	JPL · 33562
33564 Miriamshira	1999 JP_{25}	Miriam Shira Eisenberg (born 1998) was awarded second place in the 2016 Intel International Science and Engineering Fair for her behavioral and social sciences project. She attends the North Shore Hebrew Academy High School, Great Neck, New York, U.S.A.	JPL · 33564
33565 Samferguson	1999 JY_{25}	Samuel Ferguson (born 1999) was awarded second place in the 2016 Intel International Science and Engineering Fair for her biomedical engineering project. She attends the Christian Unified High School, El Cajon, California, U.S.A.	JPL · 33565
33567 Sulekhfrederic	1999 JV_{27}	Sulekh Frederic Fernando-Peiris (born 2000) was awarded second place in the 2016 Intel International Science and Engineering Fair for his physics and astronomy project. He attends the Mount Vernon High School, Mount Vernon, Ohio, U.S.A.	JPL · 33567
33568 Godishala	1999 JN_{29}	Prashant Sai Godishala (born 1998) was awarded best of category and first place in the 2016 Intel International Science and Engineering Fair for his translational medical science team project. He attends the Breck School, Golden Valley, Minnesota, U.S.A.	JPL · 33568
33569 Nikhilgopal	1999 JM_{30}	Nikhil Sajan Gopal (born 2000) was awarded second place in the 2016 Intel International Science and Engineering Fair for his microbiology project. He attends the Lawrenceville School, Lawerenceville, New Jersey, U.S.A.	JPL · 33569
33570 Jagruenstein	1999 JT_{30}	Joshua Aaron Gruenstein (born 1999) was awarded second place in the 2016 Intel International Science and Engineering Fair for his robotics and intelligent machines team project. He attends the Horace Mann School, Bronx, New York, U.S.A.	JPL · 33570
33571 Jaygupta	1999 JD_{32}	Jay Gupta (born 1998) was awarded second place in the 2016 Intel International Science and Engineering Fair for his cellular and molecular biology project. He attends the Thomas Jefferson High School for Science and Technology, Alexandria, Virginia, U.S.A.	JPL · 33571
33572 Mandolin	1999 JF_{32}	Mandolin Harris (born 1997) was awarded second place in the 2016 Intel International Science and Engineering Fair for her earth and environmental sciences project. She attends the Arkansas School for Mathematics, Sciences and the Arts, Hot Springs, Arkansas, U.S.A.	JPL · 33572
33573 Hugrace	1999 JR_{32}	Grace Hu (born 1999) was awarded first place in the 2016 Intel International Science and Engineering Fair for her materials science project. She attends the Jericho High School, Jericho, New York, U.S.A.	JPL · 33573
33574 Shailaja	1999 JA_{33}	Shailaja Humane (born 1997) was awarded second place in the 2016 Intel International Science and Engineering Fair for her physics and astronomy project. She attends the Watchung Hills Regional High School, Warren, New Jersey, U.S.A.	JPL · 33574
33575 Joshuajacob	1999 JR_{33}	Joshua Murphy Jacob (born 1999) was awarded first place in the 2016 Intel International Science and Engineering Fair for his engineering mechanics project. He attends the Saint Xavier High School, Louisville, Kentucky, U.S.A.	JPL · 33575
33580 Priyankajain	1999 JM_{35}	Priyanka Jain (born 1998) was awarded second place in the 2016 Intel International Science and Engineering Fair for her biomedical and health sciences project. She attends the La Cueva High School, Albuquerque, New Mexico, U.S.A.	JPL · 33580
33581 Rajeevjha	1999 JQ_{35}	Rajeev Jha (born 1998) was awarded best of category and first place in the 2016 Intel International Science and Engineering Fair for his behavioral and social sciences project. He also received the European Union Contest for Young Scientists Award. He attends the President Theodore Roosevelt High School, Honolulu, Hawaii, U.S.A.	JPL · 33581
33582 Tiashajoardar	1999 JJ_{36}	Tiasha Joardar (born 1998) was awarded best of category and first place in the 2016 Intel International Science and Engineering Fair for her energy project. She also received the Innovation Exploration Award. She attends the Plano West Senior High School, Plano, Texas, U.S.A.	JPL · 33582
33583 Karamchedu	1999 JV_{36}	Chaitanya Dasharathi Karamchedu (born 1999) was awarded second place in the 2016 Intel International Science and Engineering Fair for his environmental engineering project. He attends the Jesuit High School, Portland, Oregon, U.S.A.	JPL · 33583
33584 Austinkatzer	1999 JY_{37}	Austin Wolfgang Katzer (born 1999) was awarded second place in the 2016 Intel International Science and Engineering Fair for his animal sciences team project. He attends the Jasper High School, Plano, Texas, U.S.A.	JPL · 33584
33586 Keeley	1999 JH_{39}	Charlotte Underwood Keeley (born 1998) was awarded first place in the 2016 Intel International Science and Engineering Fair for her plant sciences project. She attends the Ossining High School, Ossining, New York, U.S.A.	JPL · 33586
33587 Arianakim	1999 JA_{42}	Ariana Kim (born 1998) was awarded second place in the 2016 Intel International Science and Engineering Fair for her environmental engineering team project. She attends the Saint Andrew's Priory School, Honolulu, Hawaii, U.S.A.	JPL · 33587
33589 Edwardkim	1999 JM_{46}	Edward Sangyoon Kim (born 1999) was awarded best of category and first place in the 2016 Intel International Science and Engineering Fair for his biochemistry project. He also received the Intel and Indo-US Science & Technology Forum Award. He attends the Midway High School, Waco, Texas, U.S.A.	JPL · 33589
33590 Sreelakshmi	1999 JS_{46}	Sreelakshmi Kutty (born 1998) was awarded second place in the 2016 Intel International Science and Engineering Fair for her environmental engineering team project. She attends the Saint Andrew's Priory School, Honolulu, Hawaii, U.S.A.	JPL · 33590
33591 Landsberger	1999 JW_{46}	Huws Yoshito Landsberger (born 1998) was awarded second place in the 2016 Intel International Science and Engineering Fair for his physics and astronomy project. He attends the Palos Verdes Peninsula High School, Rolling Hills Estates, California, U.S.A.	JPL · 33591
33592 Kathrynanna	1999 JJ_{47}	Kathryn Anna Lawrence (born 1998) was awarded best of category and first place in the 2016 Intel International Science and Engineering Fair for her chemistry team project. She also received the Intel Foundation Cultural and Scientific Visit to China Award. She attends the Fairview High School, Boulder, Colorado, U.S.A.	JPL · 33592
33594 Ralphlawton	1999 JN_{48}	Ralph Ignacio Lawton (born 1998) was awarded second place in the 2016 Intel International Science and Engineering Fair for his biomedical and health sciences project. He attends the Pennsylvania Leadership Charter School, West Chester, Pennsylvania, U.S.A.	JPL · 33594
33595 Jiwoolee	1999 JC_{49}	Jiwoo Lee (born 1999) was awarded best of category and first place in the 2016 Intel International Science and Engineering Fair for her biomedical and health sciences project. She also received the Intel and Indo-US Science & Technology Forum Award. She attends the Academy for Medical Science Technology, Hackensack, NJ, U.S.A.	JPL · 33595
33596 Taesoolee	1999 JM_{49}	Taesoo Daniel Lee (born 1998) was awarded second place in the 2016 Intel International Science and Engineering Fair for his materials science project. He attends the North Carolina School of Science and Mathematics, Durham, North Carolina, U.S.A.	JPL · 33596
33598 Christineliu	1999 JA_{50}	Christine Joy Liu (born 1999) was awarded second place in the 2016 Intel International Science and Engineering Fair for her computational biology and bioinformatics project. She attends the Westminster Schools, Atlanta, Georgia, U.S.A.	JPL · 33598
33599 Mckennaloop	1999 JP_{50}	McKenna Kristin Loop (born 1999) was awarded second place in the 2016 Intel International Science and Engineering Fair for her energy project. She attends the Arizona College Preparatory- Erie, Chandler, Arizona, U.S.A.	JPL · 33599
33600 Davidlu	1999 JA_{51}	David M. Lu (born 1997) was awarded second place in the 2016 Intel International Science and Engineering Fair for his microbiology project. He attends the Mills E. Godwin High School, Henrico, Virginia, U.S.A.	JPL · 33600

== 33601–33700 ==
back to top

Named minor planet	Provisional	This minor planet was named for...	Ref · Catalog
33602 Varunmandi	1999 JW_{53}	Varun Mandi (born 1998) was awarded second place in the 2016 Intel International Science and Engineering Fair for his biomedical and health sciences project. He attends the Troy High School, Fullerton, California, U.S.A.	JPL · 33602
33603 Saramason	1999 JQ_{55}	Sara Mason (born 1998) was awarded second place in the 2016 Intel International Science and Engineering Fair for her embedded systems team project. She attends the Merrimack High School, Merrimack, New Hampshire, U.S.A.	JPL · 33603
33604 McChesney	1999 JW_{55}	Evelyn Grace McChesney (born 1999) was awarded second place in the 2016 Intel International Science and Engineering Fair for her biomedical engineering team project. She attends the Breck School, Golden Valley, Minnesota, U.S.A.	JPL · 33604
33605 McCue	1999 JD_{56}	Madeline Chawla McCue (born 1998) was awarded second place in the 2016 Intel International Science and Engineering Fair for her biomedical engineering team project. She attends the Breck School, Golden Valley, Minnesota, U.S.A.	JPL · 33605
33606 Brandonmuncan	1999 JG_{56}	Brandon Michael Muncan (born 1999) was awarded second place in the 2016 Intel International Science and Engineering Fair for his translational medical science project. He attends the Queens High School for the Sciences at York College, Jamaica, New York, U.S.A.	JPL · 33606
33607 Archanamurali	1999 JF_{57}	Archana Bhagyalakshmi Murali (born 1999) was awarded second place in the 2016 Intel International Science and Engineering Fair for her computational biology and bioinformatics team project. She attends the Breck School, Golden Valley, Minnesota, U.S.A.	JPL · 33607
33608 Paladugu	1999 JA_{59}	Praharshasai Paladugu (born 1999) was awarded second place in the 2016 Intel International Science and Engineering Fair for his translational medical science project. He attends the duPont Manual High School, Louisville, Kentucky, U.S.A.	JPL · 33608
33609 Harishpalani	1999 JO_{59}	Harish Palani (born 2000) was awarded second place in the 2016 Intel International Science and Engineering Fair for his earth and environmental sciences project. He attends the Sunset High School, Portland, Oregon, U.S.A.	JPL · 33609
33610 Payra	1999 JF_{60}	Syamantak Payra (born 2001) was awarded best of category and first place in the 2016 Intel International Science and Engineering Fair for his embedded systems project. He also received the Intel Foundation Young Scientist Award. He attends the Clear Brook High School, Friendswood, Texas, U.S.A.	JPL · 33610
33613 Pendharkar	1999 JO_{63}	Aarushi Iris Pendharkar (born 2001) was awarded second place in the 2016 Intel International Science and Engineering Fair for her biomedical and health sciences project. She attends the Massachusetts Academy of Math and Science, Worcester, Massachusetts, U.S.A.	JPL · 33613
33614 Meganploch	1999 JS_{63}	Megan Coral Ploch (born 1999) was awarded second place in the 2016 Intel International Science and Engineering Fair for her environmental engineering project. She attends the Pelham Memorial High School, Pelham, New York, U.S.A.	JPL · 33614
33617 Kailashraman	1999 JQ_{65}	Kailash Raman (born 1999) was awarded second place in the 2016 Intel International Science and Engineering Fair for his chemistry project. He attends the Sandra Day O'Connor High School, Phoenix, Arizona, U.S.A.	JPL · 33617
33619 Dominickrowan	1999 JB_{66}	Dominick Michael Rowan (born 1998) was awarded first place in the 2016 Intel International Science and Engineering Fair for his physics and astronomy project. He attends the Byram Hills High School, Armonk, New York, U.S.A.	JPL · 33619
33621 Sathish	1999 JQ_{67}	Sanjeev-Kumar Mamalapuram Sathish (born 1999) was awarded first place in the 2016 Intel International Science and Engineering Fair for his cellular and molecular biology project.	JPL · 33621
33622 Sedigh	1999 JR_{67}	Kameron Sedigh (born 1998) was awarded second place in the 2016 Intel International Science and Engineering Fair for his biochemistry project.	JPL · 33622
33623 Kyraseevers	1999 JY_{68}	Kyra Leigh Seevers (born 1998) was awarded second place in the 2016 Intel International Science and Engineering Fair for her engineering mechanics project.	JPL · 33623
33624 Omersiddiqui	1999 JP_{69}	Omer Siddiqui (born 1999) was awarded second place in the 2016 Intel International Science and Engineering Fair for his math project.	JPL · 33624
33625 Slepyan	1999 JP_{70}	Ariel Slepyan (born 1998) was awarded second place in the 2016 Intel International Science and Engineering Fair for his microbiology project.	JPL · 33625
33626 Jasonsmith	1999 JH_{71}	Jason Tanner Smith (born 1999) was awarded second place in the 2016 Intel International Science and Engineering Fair for his animal sciences team project.	JPL · 33626
33628 Spettel	1999 JW_{73}	Matthew Thomas Spettel (born 1997) was awarded second place in the 2016 Intel International Science and Engineering Fair for his embedded systems team project.	JPL · 33628
33630 Swathiravi	1999 JM_{76}	Swathi Ravi Srinivasan (born 1999) was awarded second place in the 2016 Intel International Science and Engineering Fair for her biochemistry project.	JPL · 33630
33633 Strickland	1999 JL_{79}	Edmond Bruce Strickland (born 1998) was awarded second place in the 2016 Intel International Science and Engineering Fair for his engineering mechanics project.	JPL · 33633
33634 Strickler	1999 JZ_{79}	Sarah Kay Strickler (born 1997) was awarded second place in the 2016 Intel International Science and Engineering Fair for her microbiology project.	JPL · 33634
33655 Sumathipala	1999 JT_{88}	Marissa Sumathipala (born 2000) was awarded best of category and first place in the 2016 Intel International Science and Engineering Fair for her cellular and molecular biology project. She attends the Broad Run High School, Ashburn, Virginia, U.S.A.	JPL · 33655
33660 Rishishankar	1999 JS_{91}	Rishi Shankar Sundaresan (born 1998) was awarded second place in the 2016 Intel International Science and Engineering Fair for his energy project.	JPL · 33660
33661 Sophiaswartz	1999 JU_{91}	Sophia Edith Swartz (born 2000) was awarded second place in the 2016 Intel International Science and Engineering Fair for her plant sciences project.	JPL · 33661
33662 Tacescu	1999 JW_{91}	Alex Cristian Tacescu (born 1998) was awarded second place in the 2016 Intel International Science and Engineering Fair for his engineering mechanics project.	JPL · 33662
33667 Uttripathii	1999 JR_{95}	Uttkarshni Tripathii (born 2000) was awarded second place in the 2016 Intel International Science and Engineering Fair for her earth and environmental sciences project.	JPL · 33667
33677 Truell	1999 JR_{102}	Michael Truell (born 2000) was awarded second place in the 2016 Intel International Science and Engineering Fair for his robotics and intelligent machines team project.	JPL · 33677
33680 Vasconcelos	1999 JP_{108}	Francisca Vasconcelos (born 1998) was awarded second place in the 2016 Intel International Science and Engineering Fair for her robotics and intelligent machines project.	JPL · 33680
33681 Wamsley	1999 JV_{109}	Nick A.Wamsley (born 1999) was awarded first place in the 2016 Intel International Science and Engineering Fair for his microbiology project.	JPL · 33681
33682 Waylonreid	1999 JO_{113}	Waylon Reid Williams (born 1997) was awarded first place in the 2016 Intel International Science and Engineering Fair for his environmental engineering project.	JPL · 33682
33684 Xiaomichael	1999 JW_{119}	Michael Xiao (born 1998) was awarded first place in the 2016 Intel International Science and Engineering Fair for his biomedical and health sciences project.	JPL · 33684
33685 Younglove	1999 JK_{120}	Katherine Afton Younglove (born 1998) was awarded best of category and first place in the 2016 Intel International Science and Engineering Fair for her chemistry team project. She also received the Intel Foundation Cultural and Scientific Visit to China Award.	JPL · 33685
33687 Julianbain	1999 JP_{122}	Julian Manitou Bain (born 2003) is a finalist in the 2017 Broadcom MASTERS, a math and science competition for middle school students, for his electrical and mechanical engineering project. He attends the Missoula International School, Missoula, Montana.	JPL · 33687
33688 Meghnabehari	1999 JQ_{123}	Meghna Swaminathan Behari (born 2002) is a finalist in the 2017 Broadcom MASTERS, a math and science competition for middle school students, for her materials & bioengineering project. She attends the Marshall Middle School, Wexford, Pennsylvania.	JPL · 33688
33690 Noahcain	1999 JD_{127}	Noah Miles Cain (born 2005) is a finalist in the 2017 Broadcom MASTERS, a math and science competition for middle school students, for his environmental and earth sciences project. He attends the Krystal School of Science, Math, and Technology, Hesperia, California.	JPL · 33690
33691 Andrewchiang	1999 JT_{131}	Andrew Chiang (born 2002) is a finalist in the 2017 Broadcom MASTERS, a math and science competition for middle school students, for his electrical and mechanical engineering project. He attends the BASIS Independent Silicon Valley, San Jose, California.	JPL · 33691
33696 Crouchley	1999 KM_{8}	Austin Vincent Crouchley (born 2003) is a finalist in the 2017 Broadcom MASTERS, a math and science competition for middle school students, for his electrical and mechanical engineering project. He attends the Garden City Middle School, Garden City, New York.	JPL · 33696
33699 Jessiegan	1999 KT_{12}	Jessie Low Gan (born 2003) is a finalist in the 2017 Broadcom MASTERS, a math and science competition for middle school students, for her microbiology and biochemistry project. She attends the San Diego Jewish Academy, San Diego, California.	JPL · 33699
33700 Gluckman	1999 KR_{13}	Leia Ruth Gluckman (born 2004) is a finalist in the 2017 Broadcom MASTERS, a math and science competition for middle school students, for her materials & bioengineering project. She attends the Beverly Vista Middle School, Beverly Hills, California.	JPL · 33700

== 33701–33800 ==
back to top

Named minor planet	Provisional	This minor planet was named for...	Ref · Catalog
33701 Gotthold	1999 KD_{14}	Zoe Anne Gotthold (born 2002) is a finalist in the 2017 Broadcom MASTERS, a math and science competition for middle school students, for her environmental and earth sciences project. She attends the Carmichael Middle School, Richland, Washington.	JPL · 33701
33702 Spencergreen	1999 KD_{15}	Spencer S. Green (born 2004) is a finalist in the 2017 Broadcom MASTERS, a math and science competition for middle school students, for his electrical and mechanical engineering project. He attends the Pegasus School, Huntington Beach, California.	JPL · 33702
33703 Anthonyhill	1999 KZ_{15}	Anthony Glenn Hill (born 2002) is a finalist in the 2017 Broadcom MASTERS, a math and science competition for middle school students, for his plant science project. He attends the Churchill Junior High, Salt Lake City, Utah.	JPL · 33703
33704 Herinkang	1999 KY_{16}	Herin Kang (born 2004) is a finalist in the 2017 Broadcom MASTERS, a math and science competition for middle school students, for her environmental and earth sciences project. She attends the Stratford Middle School, San Jose, California.	JPL · 33704
33713 Mithravamshi	1999 LE_{22}	Mithra Vamshi Karamchedu (born 2003) is a finalist in the 2017 Broadcom MASTERS, a math and science competition for middle school students, for his environmental and earth sciences project. He attends the Stoller Middle School, Portland, Oregon.	JPL · 33713
33714 Sarakaufman	1999 LG_{24}	Sara Lillian Kaufman (born 2005) is a finalist in the 2017 Broadcom MASTERS, a math and science competition for middle school students, for her electrical and mechanical engineering project. She attends the American Heritage School, Plantation, Florida.	JPL · 33714
33725 Robertkent	1999 NJ_{6}	Robert Allen Kent (born 2002) is a finalist in the 2017 Broadcom MASTERS, a math and science competition for middle school students, for his environmental and earth sciences project. He attends the Saint Anselm School, Chesterland, Ohio.	JPL · 33725
33727 Kummel	1999 NS_{13}	Kathryn Tsi-Pak Kummel (born 2003) is a finalist in the 2017 Broadcom MASTERS, a math and science competition for middle school students, for her environmental and earth sciences project. She attends the North Middle School, Colorado Springs, Colorado.	JPL · 33727
33734 Stephenlitt	1999 NC_{34}	Stephen Robert Litt (born 2004) is a finalist in the 2017 Broadcom MASTERS, a math and science competition for middle school students, for his medicine and health sciences project. He attends the Lovinggood Middle School, Powder Springs, Georgia.	JPL · 33734
33737 Helenlyons	1999 NT_{38}	Helen L. Lyons (born 2003) is a finalist in the 2017 Broadcom MASTERS, a math and science competition for middle school students, for her electrical and mechanical engineering project. She attends the Hunter College High School, New York, New York.	JPL · 33737
33740 Arjunmoorthy	1999 NS_{47}	Arjun Moorthy (born 2002) is a finalist in the 2017 Broadcom MASTERS, a math and science competition for middle school students, for his behavioral and social sciences project. He attends the BASIS Scottsdale, Scottsdale, Arizona.	JPL · 33740
33746 Sombart	1999 OK	Jean-Pierre Sombart, a French amateur astronomer who constructed the 0.4-m Newtonian-Cassegrain telescope at the Pises Observatory (122) and also took an active part in using it to observe minor planets	JPL · 33746
33747 Clingan	1999 PK_{4}	Roy Clingan (born 1950), an American amateur astronomer and discoverer of minor planets	JPL · 33747
33748 Davegault	1999 PP_{4}	Dave Gault (born 1957) is an amiable coordinator and diligent analyser of occultations for the Australasian region. In 2021 he co-discovered the relatively large and nearby satellite to 4337 Arecibo. It is the first asteroid moon discovered and confirmed by way of occultation results alone.	IAU · 33748
33750 Davehiggins	1999 RD_{2}	David J. Higgins (born 1961), Australian business analyst and amateur astronomer, operator of Hunters Hill Observatory and a discoverer of minor planets	JPL · 33750
33761 Honoranavid	1999 RR_{74}	Honora Ellen Navid (born 2003) is a finalist in the 2017 Broadcom MASTERS, a math and science competition for middle school students, for her environmental and earth sciences project. She attends the Shady Side Academy Middle School, Pittsburgh, Pennsylvania.	JPL · 33761
33762 Sanjayseshan	1999 RV_{83}	Sanjay Seshan (born 2002) is a finalist in the 2017 Broadcom MASTERS, a math and science competition for middle school students, for his electrical and mechanical engineering project. He attends the Dorseyville Middle School, Pittsburgh, Pennsylvania.	JPL · 33762
33789 Sharmacam	1999 SD_{8}	Cameron Sharma (born 2004) is a finalist in the 2017 Broadcom MASTERS, a math and science competition for middle school students, for his medicine and health sciences project. He attends the George H. Moody Middle School, Richmond, Virginia.	JPL · 33789
33799 Myra	1999 UV_{2}	Myra J. Halpin, American finalist in both NASA's Teacher in Space (1985) and Educator Astronaut Teacher (2004) competitions	JPL · 33799
33800 Gross	1999 VB_{7}	John Gross (born 1959), American amateur astronomer	JPL · 33800

== 33801–33900 ==
back to top

Named minor planet	Provisional	This minor planet was named for...	Ref · Catalog
33801 Emilyshi	1999 VF_{28}	Emily Tian Shi (born 2003) is a finalist in the 2017 Broadcom MASTERS, a math and science competition for middle school students, for her plant science project. She attends the Cambridge School, San Diego, California.	JPL · 33801
33803 Julienpeloton	1999 VK_{210}	Julien Peloton (b. 1988), a French software engineer.	IAU · 33803
33806 Shrivastava	1999 XW_{39}	Aryansh Shrivastava (born 2004) is a finalist in the 2017 Broadcom MASTERS, a math and science competition for middle school students, for his computer science and software engineering project. He attends the Washington High School, Fremont, California.	JPL · 33806
33809 Petrescu	1999 XK_{152}	Elisabeta Petrescu (b. 1992), is a Romanian astronomer.	IAU · 33809
33810 Tangirala	1999 XZ_{156}	Pujita Srilalitha Tangirala (born 2004) is a finalist in the 2017 Broadcom MASTERS, a math and science competition for middle school students, for her chemistry project. She attends the Challenger School, Strawberry Park, San Jose, California.	JPL · 33810
33811 Scottobin	1999 XO_{164}	Scott Russell Tobin (born 2003) is a finalist in the 2017 Broadcom MASTERS, a math and science competition for middle school students, for his environmental and earth sciences project. He attends the Creekside Middle School, Port Orange, Florida.	JPL · 33811
33814 Viswesh	2000 AQ_{15}	Annika Viswesh (born 2003) is a finalist in the 2017 Broadcom MASTERS, a math and science competition for middle school students, for her computer science and software engineering project. She attends the Stratford Sunnyvale Raynor Middle School, Sunnyvale, California.	JPL · 33814
33817 Fariswald	2000 AF_{64}	Faris Irwin Wald (born 2002) is a finalist in the 2017 Broadcom MASTERS, a math and science competition for middle school students, for his environmental and earth sciences project. He attends the Capshaw Middle School, Santa Fe, New Mexico.	JPL · 33817
33823 Mariorigutti	2000 CQ_{1}	Mario Rigutti (born 1926) is an accomplished astronomer. He worked at the Arcetri Observatory, was president of the IAS, was chairman of the Solar Eclipses Working Group of the International Astronomical Union and was director of the Capodimonte Astronomical Observatory in Naples.	JPL · 33823
33825 Reganwill	2000 DQ_{81}	Regan Catherine Williams (born 2005) is a finalist in the 2017 Broadcom MASTERS, a math and science competition for middle school students, for her animal science project. She attends the Roland-Grise Middle School, Wilmington, North Carolina.	JPL · 33825
33826 Kevynadams	2000 DW_{82}	Kevyn Adams mentored a finalist in the 2017 Broadcom MASTERS, a math and science competition for middle school students. He teaches at the BASIS Independent Silicon Valley, San Jose, California.	JPL · 33826
33829 Asherson	2000 EZ_{66}	Caryn Asherson mentored a finalist in the 2017 Broadcom MASTERS, a math and science competition for middle school students. She teaches at the Beverly Vista Middle School, Beverly Hills, California.	JPL · 33829
33832 Johnplane	2000 EE_{135}	John M. C. Plane (b. 1958), a British atmospheric chemist	IAU · 33832
33834 Hannahkaplan	2000 ES_{158}	Hannah Kaplan (born 1991) is a postdoctoral researcher at the Southwest Research Institute (Boulder, CO) working on the OSIRIS-REx mission. She specializes in using remote sensing techniques and spectroscopy for research in Earth and Planetary Sciences.	IAU · 33834
33838 Brandabaker	2000 GU_{49}	Branda Baker mentored a finalist in the 2017 Broadcom MASTERS, a math and science competition for middle school students. She teaches at the Carmichael Middle School, Richland, Washington.	JPL · 33838
33845 Aprilrussell	2000 GT_{157}	April A. Russell (b. 1981), an American astronomer.	IAU · 33845
33850 Mohammadsaki	2000 HT_{26}	Mohammad (Mohi) Saki (b. 1988), an Iranian postdoctoral researcher at Auburn University.	IAU · 33850
33852 Baschnagel	2000 HO_{52}	Amy Baschnagel mentored a finalist in the 2017 Broadcom MASTERS, a math and science competition for middle school students. She teaches at the Marshall Middle School, Wexford, Pennsylvania.	JPL · 33852
33856 Rutuparekh	2000 HD_{73}	Rutu Parekh (b. 1991), an Indian planetary scientist.	IAU · 33856
33861 Boucvalt	2000 HO_{94}	Cathy Boucvalt mentored a finalist in the 2017 Broadcom MASTERS, a math and science competition for middle school students. She teaches at the John Curtis Christian School, River Ridge, Louisiana.	JPL · 33861
33863 Elfriederwin	2000 JH_{7}	Elfriede and Erwin Schwab Sr., parents of German astronomer Erwin Schwab, member of the group that discovered this body ‡	JPL · 33863
33869 Brunnermatt	2000 JK_{32}	Matt Brunner mentored a finalist in the 2017 Broadcom MASTERS, a math and science competition for middle school students. He teaches at the Shady Side Academy Middle School, Pittsburgh, Pennsylvania.	JPL · 33869
33871 Locastillo	2000 JK_{34}	Lourdie Castillo mentored a finalist in the 2017 Broadcom MASTERS, a math and science competition for middle school students. He teaches at the Hunter College High School, New York, New York.	JPL · 33871
33872 Kristichung	2000 JX_{39}	Kristi Chung mentored a finalist in the 2017 Broadcom MASTERS, a math and science competition for middle school students. She teaches at the Stratford Middle School, San Jose, California.	JPL · 33872
33875 Laurencooney	2000 JY_{54}	Lauren Cooney mentored a finalist in the 2017 Broadcom MASTERS, a math and science competition for middle school students. She teaches at the BASIS Scottsdale, Scottsdale, Arizona.	JPL · 33875
33879 Kierstendeen	2000 JG_{62}	Kiersten Deen mentored a finalist in the 2017 Broadcom MASTERS, a math and science competition for middle school students. She teaches at the North Middle School, Colorado Springs, Colorado.	JPL · 33879
33882 Schönbächler	2000 JM_{74}	Maria Schönbächler (b. 1969), a Swiss professor of Isotope Geology at ETH Zürich, Switzerland.	IAU · 33882
33886 Lilydeveau	2000 KU_{18}	Lily Deveau mentored a finalist in the 2017 Broadcom MASTERS, a math and science competition for middle school students. She teaches at the San Diego Jewish Academy, San Diego, California.	JPL · 33886
33889 Jengebo	2000 KZ_{22}	Jen Gebo mentored a finalist in the 2017 Broadcom MASTERS, a math and science competition for middle school students. She teaches at the Missoula International School, Missoula, Montana.	JPL · 33889
33892 Meligingrich	2000 KP_{25}	Melissa Gingrich mentored a finalist in the 2017 Broadcom MASTERS, a math and science competition for middle school students. She teaches at the Cambridge School, San Diego, California.	JPL · 33892
33896 Hickson	2000 KL_{40}	Dylan Hickson (born 1991) is a postdoctoral scholar at the Arecibo Observatory, Puerto Rico, who specializes in radar observations of near-Earth asteroids and understanding the properties of planetary surfaces and regolith using radar scattering measurements.	IAU · 33896
33897 Erikagreen	2000 KU_{41}	Erika Green mentored a finalist in the 2017 Broadcom MASTERS, a math and science competition for middle school students. She teaches at the Burlington Township Middle School, Burlington, New Jersey.	JPL · 33897
33898 Kendra	2000 KQ_{53}	Kendra Harrison mentored a finalist in the 2017 Broadcom MASTERS, a math and science competition for middle school students. She teaches at the Roland-Grise Middle School, Wilmington, North Carolina.	JPL · 33898

== 33901–34000 ==
back to top

Named minor planet	Provisional	This minor planet was named for...	Ref · Catalog
33902 Ingoldsby	2000 KU_{64}	Martin Ingoldsby mentored a finalist in the 2017 Broadcom MASTERS, a math and science competition for middle school students. He teaches at the Creekside Middle School, Port Orange, Florida.	JPL · 33902
33903 Youssefmoulane	2000 KH_{68}	Youssef Moulane (b. 1992), a Moroccan astronomer.	IAU · 33903
33904 Janardhanan	2000 KC_{77}	Vidya Janardhanan mentored a finalist in the 2017 Broadcom MASTERS, a math and science competition for middle school students. She teaches at the Stratford Sunnyvale Raynor Middle School, Sunnyvale, California.	JPL · 33904
33905 Leyajoykutty	2000 KB_{80}	Leya Joykutty mentored a finalist in the 2017 Broadcom MASTERS, a math and science competition for middle school students. She teaches at the American Heritage School, Plantation, Florida.	JPL · 33905
33907 Christykrenek	2000 LP_{4}	Christy Krenek mentored a finalist in the 2017 Broadcom MASTERS, a math and science competition for middle school students. She teaches at the Capshaw Middle School, Santa Fe, New Mexico.	JPL · 33907
33910 Lestarge	2000 LJ_{9}	Brian LeStarge mentored a finalist in the 2017 Broadcom MASTERS, a math and science competition for middle school students. He teaches at the Churchill Junior High, Salt Lake City, Utah.	JPL · 33910
33912 Melissanoland	2000 LV_{13}	Melissa Noland mentored a finalist in the 2017 Broadcom MASTERS, a math and science competition for middle school students. She teaches at the Krystal School of Science, Math, and Technology, Hesperia, California.	JPL · 33912
33917 Kellyoconnor	2000 LK_{19}	Kelly O'Connor mentored a finalist in the 2017 Broadcom MASTERS, a math and science competition for middle school students. She teaches at the George H. Moody Middle School, Richmond, Virginia.	JPL · 33917
33918 Janiscoville	2000 LL_{19}	Janice Scoville mentored a finalist in the 2017 Broadcom MASTERS, a math and science competition for middle school students. She teaches at the Lovinggood Middle School, Powder Springs, Georgia.	JPL · 33918
33920 Trivisonno	2000 LZ_{20}	Andrea Trivisonno mentored a finalist in the 2017 Broadcom MASTERS, a math and science competition for middle school students. She teaches at the Saint Anselm School, Chesterland, Ohio.	JPL · 33920
33923 Juliewarren	2000 LH_{25}	Julie Warren mentored a finalist in the 2017 Broadcom MASTERS, a math and science competition for middle school students. She teaches at the Pegasus School, Huntington Beach, California.	JPL · 33923
33924 Rosanaaraujo	2000 LS_{26}	Rosana Nogueira de Araujo (b. 1981), a Brazilian researcher at the Universidad Estadual de São Paulo (UNESP), Brazil.	IAU · 33924
33926 Normand	2000 LC_{27}	Jonathan Normand (b. 1979), a French engineer at the Institute for Celestial Mechanics and Ephemerides Computation, Paris Observatory	IAU · 33926
33927 Jenniferscully	2000 LH_{27}	Jennifer Scully (b. 1987), an Irish scientist specializing in planetary geology.	IAU · 33927
33928 Aswinsekhar	2000 LJ_{27}	Aswin Sekhar (b. 1985), the first professional meteor astronomer from India in modern times	IAU · 33928
33929 Lisaprato	2000 LP_{27}	Lisa A. Prato, assistant astronomer at Lowell Observatory	JPL · 33929
33931 Alexeysergeyev	2000 LW_{28}	Alexey Sergeyev (b. 1974), a Ukrainian astronomer.	IAU · 33931
33932 Keane	2000 LZ_{28}	Jacqueline V. Keane (born 1973) is an Assistant Astronomer at the Institute for Astronomy, University of Hawaii whose research interests include the use of ground- and space-based facilities to study the comae and nuclei of comets.	IAU · 33932
33933 Timlister	2000 LE_{29}	Tim Lister (b. 1975), a British senior scientist at the Las Cumbres Observatory.	IAU · 33933
33936 Johnwells	2000 LL_{30}	John Wells mentored a finalist in the 2017 Broadcom MASTERS, a math and science competition for middle school students. He teaches at the William Hopkins Junior High School, Fremont, California.	JPL · 33936
33937 Raphaelmarschall	2000 LZ_{31}	Raphael Marschall (born 1987) is a Research Scholar at the Southwest Research Institute whose studies include modeling the gas and dust emission from cometary nuclei and interpretation of a complementary set of observations of comet Churyumov-Gerasimenko acquired by the Rosetta mission.	IAU · 33937
33940 Morgado	2000 LS_{35}	Bruno Morgado (b. 1991), a Brazilian adjunct professor at the Observatório do Valongo, Universidad Federal de Rio de Janeiro, Brazil	IAU · 33940
33941 Mouginot	2000 LX_{35}	Jérémie Mouginot (1982–2022), a French planetary scientist at the Astrophysics and Planetolgy Institute IPAG (Grenoble, France).	IAU · 33941
33942 Davidmiller	2000 LA_{36}	David W. Miller (b. 1960), an American aerospace engineer.	IAU · 33942
33958 Zaferiou	2000 NK_{5}	Paraskevy Zaferiou mentored a finalist in the 2017 Broadcom MASTERS, a math and science competition for middle school students. She teaches at the Garden City Middle School, Garden City, New York.	JPL · 33958
33961 Macinleyneve	2000 NO_{9}	Macinley Neve Butson (born 2000) was awarded first place in the 2017 Intel International Science and Engineering Fair for her translational medical science project. She attends the Illawarra Grammar School, Mangerton, NSW, Australia.	JPL · 33961
33963 Moranhidalgo	2000 NA_{10}	Camila Moran-Hidalgo (born 2002) was awarded second place in the 2017 Intel International Science and Engineering Fair for her biomedical engineering project. She attends the Westdale Secondary School, Hamilton, Ontario, Canada.	JPL · 33963
33964 Patrickshober	2000 NS_{10}	Patrick Shober (b. 1995), an American planetary scientist	IAU · 33964
33970 Conorbenson	2000 NC_{14}	Conor J. Benson (born 1993), American aerospace engineer.	IAU · 33970
33971 Alexdavis	2000 NL_{14}	Alex B. Davis (born 1993), American aerospace engineer.	IAU · 33971
33972 Fuentesmuñoz	2000 NO_{15}	Oscar Fuentes Muñoz (born 1995), Spanish planetary scientist.	IAU · 33972
33973 Xiyunhou	2000 NS_{16}	Xiyun Hou (born 1981), Chinese dynamical astronomer.	IAU · 33973
33974 Alexmeyer	2000 ND_{17}	Alex J. Meyer (born 1995), American planetary scientist.	IAU · 33974
33975 Shotatakahashi	2000 NF_{15}	Shota Takahashi (born 1994), Japanese aerospace engineer.	IAU · 33975
33976 Van Wal	2000 NL_{19}	Stefaan Van Wal (born 1992), Belgian aerospace engineer.	IAU · 33976
33979 Sunhaochun	2000 NJ_{21}	Sun Haochun Michael (born 2000) was awarded second place in the 2017 Intel International Science and Engineering Fair for his math team project. He attends the Shanghai American School Puxi, Shanghai, China.	JPL · 33979
33990 Kathleenmcbride	2000 ND_{27}	Kathleen McBride (b. 1962), an American veteran meteorite and cosmic dust processor at NASA Johnson Space Center.	IAU · 33990
33991 Weixunjing	2000 NB_{28}	Wei Xunjing (born 1999) was awarded first place in the 2017 Intel International Science and Engineering Fair for her physics and astronomy project. She attends the Shanghai High School, Shanghai, China.	JPL · 33991
33994 Regidufour	2000 OR_{1}	Reginald Dufour, professor in Rice University, Houston	JPL · 33994
34000 Martinmatl	2000 OL_{4}	Martin Matl (born 1999) was awarded second place in the 2017 Intel International Science and Engineering Fair for his plant sciences project. He attends the Gymnazium Brno, Trida Kapitana Jarose, Brno, Czech Republic.	JPL · 34000

back to top

Preceded by 32,001–33,000	Meanings of minor-planet names List of minor planets: 33,001–34,000	Succeeded by 34,001–35,000
