= Meanings of minor-planet names: 32001–33000 =

As minor planet discoveries are confirmed, they are given a permanent number by the IAU's Minor Planet Center (MPC), and the discoverers can then submit names for them, following the IAU's naming conventions. The list below concerns those minor planets in the specified number-range that have received names, and explains the meanings of those names.

Official naming citations of newly named small Solar System bodies are approved and published in a bulletin by IAU's Working Group for Small Bodies Nomenclature (WGSBN). Before May 2021, citations were published in MPC's Minor Planet Circulars for many decades. Recent citations can also be found on the JPL Small-Body Database (SBDB). Until his death in 2016, German astronomer Lutz D. Schmadel compiled these citations into the Dictionary of Minor Planet Names (DMP) and regularly updated the collection.

Based on Paul Herget's The Names of the Minor Planets, Schmadel also researched the unclear origin of numerous asteroids, most of which had been named prior to World War II. This article incorporates text from this source, which is in the public domain: SBDB New namings may only be added to this list below after official publication as the preannouncement of names is condemned. The WGSBN publishes a comprehensive guideline for the naming rules of non-cometary small Solar System bodies.

== 32001–32100 ==
Named minor planet	Provisional	This minor planet was named for...	Ref · Catalog
32001 Golbin	2000 HF_{51}	Benjamin David Golbin (born 1998) was awarded second place in the 2015 Intel International Science and Engineering Fair for his plant sciences team project.	JPL · 32001
32002 Gorokhovsky	2000 HK_{51}	Elliot Gorokhovsky (born 1999) was awarded first place in the 2015 Intel International Science and Engineering Fair for his systems software project.	JPL · 32002
32005 Roberthalfon	2000 HG_{52}	Robert Z. Halfon (born 1998) was awarded second place in the 2015 Intel International Science and Engineering Fair for his environmental engineering project	JPL · 32005
32006 Hallisey	2000 HM_{52}	Olivia Anne Hallisey (born 1998) was awarded first place in the 2015 Intel International Science and Engineering Fair for her biomedical and health sciences project.	JPL · 32006
32007 Amirhelmy	2000 HY_{52}	Amir Helmy (born 2001) was awarded second place in the 2015 Intel International Science and Engineering Fair for his systems software project.	JPL · 32007
32008 Adriángalád	2000 HM_{53}	Adrián Galád (born 1970), an astronomer and discoverer of minor planets at Modra and Ondřejov observatories who has (co-)authored a number of papers on asteroid photometric observations and orbital integrations.	JPL · 32008
32013 Elkekersten	2000 HJ_{57}	Elke Kersten (b. 1985), a German cartographer of planetary surfaces.	IAU · 32013
32014 Bida	2000 HL_{64}	Thomas A. Bida (born 1959), an instrument scientist at Lowell Observatory.	JPL · 32014
32018 Robhenning	2000 HD_{78}	Robert Cole Henning (born 1997) was awarded second place in the 2015 Intel International Science and Engineering Fair for his embedded systems project.	JPL · 32018
32019 Krithikaiyer	2000 HK_{83}	Krithika Iyer (born 1999) was awarded second place in the 2015 Intel International Science and Engineering Fair for her math project.	JPL · 32019
32021 Lilyjenkins	2000 HE_{88}	Lily Nalulani Jenkins (born 1999) was awarded first place in the 2015 Intel International Science and Engineering Fair for her earth and environmental sciences team project.	JPL · 32021
32022 Sarahjenkins	2000 HH_{88}	Sarah 'Alohilani Jenkins (born 1997) was awarded first place in the 2015 Intel International Science and Engineering Fair for her earth and environmental sciences team project.	JPL · 32022
32025 Karanjerath	2000 HX_{89}	Karan Jerath (born 1996) was awarded best of category award and first place in the 2015 Intel ISEF for his environmental engineering project. He also received the Intel Foundation Young Scientist Award and the Science & Technology Forum Visit to India.	JPL · 32025
32027 Jupitercheng	2000 HO_{100}	Hiu Ching Jupiter Cheng (b. 1995), a Hong Kong planetary scientist.	IAU · 32027
32031 Joyjin	2000 JC_{16}	Joy Qiu Jin (born 1997) was awarded second place in the 2015 Intel International Science and Engineering Fair for her biomedical and health sciences project.	JPL · 32031
32032 Askandola	2000 JG_{16}	Anmolpreet Singh Kandola (born 1997) was awarded second place in the 2015 Intel International Science and Engineering Fair for his animal sciences project.	JPL · 32032
32033 Arjunkapoor	2000 JV_{16}	Arjun Kapoor (born 1997) was awarded second place in the 2015 Intel International Science and Engineering Fair for his systems software team project	JPL · 32033
32034 Sophiakorner	2000 JE_{17}	Sophia Nicole Korner (born 1999) was awarded best of category award and first place in the 2015 Intel ISEF for her behavioral and social sciences team project. She also received the Intel Foundation Cultural and Scientific Visit to China Award.	JPL · 32034
32037 Deepikakurup	2000 JZ_{21}	Deepika Saraswathy Kurup (born 1998) was awarded second place in the 2015 Intel International Science and Engineering Fair for her environmental engineering project.	JPL · 32037
32038 Kwiecinski	2000 JN_{22}	Jarek Kwiecinski (born 2000) was awarded second place in the 2015 Intel International Science and Engineering Fair for his earth and environmental sciences project.	JPL · 32038
32044 Lakmazaheri	2000 JB_{28}	Ava Carmen Lakmazaheri (born 1998) was awarded best of category award and first place in the 2015 Intel ISEF for her robotics and intelligent machines project. She also received the Philip V. Streich Memorial Award.	JPL · 32044
32047 Wenjiali	2000 JW_{28}	Wenjia Dara Li (born 1998) was awarded second place in the 2015 Intel International Science and Engineering Fair for her plant sciences team project.	JPL · 32047
32048 Kathyliu	2000 JM_{31}	Kathy Liu (born 1998) was awarded best of category award and first place in the 2015 Intel ISEF for her energy project. She also received the Intel Foundation Cultural and Scientific Visit to China Award.	JPL · 32048
32049 Jonathanma	2000 JJ_{32}	Jonathan QuanXuan Ma (born 1998) was awarded second place in the 2015 Intel International Science and Engineering Fair for his computational biology and bioinformatics team project.	JPL · 32049
32051 Sadhikamalladi	2000 JF_{37}	Sadhika S. Malladi (born 1998) was awarded second place in the 2015 Intel International Science and Engineering Fair for her computational biology and bioinformatics team project.	JPL · 32051
32052 Diyamathur	2000 JJ_{37}	Diya Mathur (born 1998) was awarded best of category award and first place in the 2015 Intel ISEF for her behavioral and social sciences team project. She also received the Intel Foundation Cultural and Scientific Visit to China Award.	JPL · 32052
32053 Demetrimaxim	2000 JN_{37}	Demetri Maxim (born 1998) was awarded best of category award and first place in the 2015 Intel International Science and Engineering Fair for his cellular and molecular biology project.	JPL · 32053
32054 Musunuri	2000 JT_{37}	Sriharshita Vani Musunuri (born 2000) was awarded best of category award and first place in the 2015 Intel ISEF for her energy project. She also received the Innovation Exploration Award.	JPL · 32054
32056 Abrarnadroo	2000 JM_{41}	Abrar Ali Nadroo (born 1997) was awarded second place in the 2015 Intel International Science and Engineering Fair for his biochemistry project.	JPL · 32056
32057 Ethannovek	2000 JT_{41}	Ethan Novek (born 1999) was awarded first place in the 2015 Intel International Science and Engineering Fair for his energy project.	JPL · 32057
32058 Charlesnoyes	2000 JW_{43}	Charles Noyes (born 1999) was awarded best of category award and first place in the 2015 Intel ISEF for his systems software project. He also received the London International Youth Science Forum, Philip V. Streich Memorial Award.	JPL · 32058
32059 Ruchipandya	2000 JE_{44}	Ruchi Sandeep Pandya (born 1997) was awarded second place in the 2015 Intel International Science and Engineering Fair for her chemistry project.	JPL · 32059
32060 Wyattpontius	2000 JN_{46}	Wyatt Martin Pontius (born 1998) was awarded first place in the 2015 Intel International Science and Engineering Fair for his materials science team project	JPL · 32060
32062 Amolpunjabi	2000 JQ_{49}	Amol Punjabi (born 1998) was awarded best of category award and first place in the 2015 Intel ISEF for his biochemistry project. He also received the Intel and Indo-US Science & Technology Forum Visit to India.	JPL · 32062
32063 Pusapaty	2000 JF_{51}	Sai Sameer Pusapaty (born 1999) was awarded second place in the 2015 Intel International Science and Engineering Fair for his environmental engineering project.	JPL · 32063
32065 Radulovacki	2000 JC_{52}	Reid W. Radulovacki (born 1998) was awarded second place in the 2015 Intel International Science and Engineering Fair for his biomedical and health sciences project.	JPL · 32065
32066 Ramayya	2000 JK_{52}	Shreya Sundaresh Ramayya (born 1997) was awarded first place in the 2015 Intel International Science and Engineering Fair for her chemistry project.	JPL · 32066
32067 Ranganathan	2000 JW_{56}	Noopur Ranganathan (born 1999) was awarded second place in the 2015 Intel International Science and Engineering Fair for her behavioral and social sciences project.	JPL · 32067
32069 Mayarao	2000 JS_{60}	Maya Rao (born 1996) was awarded second place in the 2015 Intel International Science and Engineering Fair for her earth and environmental sciences project.	JPL · 32069
32070 Michaelretchin	2000 JC_{61}	Michael Retchin (born 1997) was awarded best of category award and first place in the 2015 Intel ISEF for his computational biology and bioinformatics team project. He also received the Intel and Indo-US Science & Technology Forum Visit to India.	JPL · 32070
32071 Matthewretchin	2000 JG_{61}	Matthew Retchin (born 1997) was awarded best of category award and first place in the 2015 Intel ISEF for his computational biology and bioinformatics team project. He also received the Intel and Indo-US Science & Technology Forum Visit to India.	JPL · 32071
32072 Revanur	2000 JL_{61}	Swetha Revanur (born 1998) was awarded first place in the 2015 Intel International Science and Engineering Fair for her computational biology and bioinformatics project.	JPL · 32072
32073 Cassidyryan	2000 JT_{61}	Cassidy Ryan (born 1997) was awarded second place in the 2015 Intel International Science and Engineering Fair for her earth and environmental sciences project.	JPL · 32073
32074 Kevinsadhu	2000 JF_{64}	Kevin Sadhu (born 1998) was awarded second place in the 2015 Intel International Science and Engineering Fair for his biochemistry team project.	JPL · 32074
32078 Jamesavoldelli	2000 JQ_{75}	James Savoldelli (born 1998) was awarded first place in the 2015 Intel International Science and Engineering Fair for his environmental engineering team project.	JPL · 32078
32079 Hughsavoldelli	2000 JT_{75}	Hugh Savoldelli (born 1998) was awarded first place in the 2015 Intel International Science and Engineering Fair for his environmental engineering team project.	JPL · 32079
32080 Sanashareef	2000 JG_{77}	Sana Shareef (born 2000) was awarded second place in the 2015 Intel International Science and Engineering Fair for her animal sciences project.	JPL · 32080
32082 Sominsky	2000 JH_{83}	Levy Aaron Sominsky (born 1998) was awarded second place in the 2015 Intel International Science and Engineering Fair for his plant sciences team project.	JPL · 32082
32085 Tomback	2000 KD_{8}	Drew Tomback (born 1998) was awarded first place in the 2015 Intel International Science and Engineering Fair for his environmental engineering team project.	JPL · 32085
32086 Viviannetu	2000 KV_{17}	Vivianne Tu (born 1997) was awarded second place in the 2015 Intel International Science and Engineering Fair for her physics and astronomy team project.	JPL · 32086
32087 Vemulapalli	2000 KB_{25}	Anoop Vemulapalli (born 1997) was awarded second place in the 2015 Intel International Science and Engineering Fair for his plant sciences team project.	JPL · 32087
32088 Liamwallace	2000 KE_{25}	Liam Alexander Wallace (born 1997) was awarded first place in the 2015 Intel International Science and Engineering Fair for his materials science team project.	JPL · 32088
32089 Wojtania	2000 KO_{28}	Nicky Wojtania (born 1999) was awarded second place in the 2015 Intel International Science and Engineering Fair for her materials science project.	JPL · 32089
32090 Craigworley	2000 KC_{29}	Craig Worley (born 1997) was awarded second place in the 2015 Intel International Science and Engineering Fair for his energy project.	JPL · 32090
32091 Jasonwu	2000 KE_{30}	Jason Wu (born 1999) was awarded second place in the 2015 Intel International Science and Engineering Fair for his biomedical and health sciences project.	JPL · 32091
32092 Brianxia	2000 KG_{31}	Brian Xia (born 2000) was awarded second place in the 2015 Intel International Science and Engineering Fair for his animal sciences project.	JPL · 32092
32093 Zhengyan	2000 KQ_{31}	Zheng Yan (born 1997) was awarded second place in the 2015 Intel International Science and Engineering Fair for his biomedical and health sciences project.	JPL · 32093
32096 Puckett	2000 KO_{38}	Tim Puckett (born 1962), an American astronomer who built the Puckett Observatory in Elijay, Georgia, for cometary studies and supernova discovery. His team has over 75 supernova discoveries to its credit (Src).	JPL · 32096

== 32101–32200 ==
back to top

Named minor planet	Provisional	This minor planet was named for...	Ref · Catalog
32101 Williamyin	2000 KA_{51}	William Yin (born 1999) was awarded second place in the 2015 Intel International Science and Engineering Fair for his materials science project.	JPL · 32101
32103 Reʼemsari	2000 KF_{52}	Reʼem Sari (born 1971) is an astrophysicist at the Hebrew University in Jerusalem, recognized for studying gamma-ray bursts, planet formation, the Kuiper belt, internal structure of asteroids, and evolution of binary systems.	IAU · 32103
32104 Emmarainey	2000 KR_{52}	Emma Rainey (born 1980), scientist at the Johns Hopkins Applied Physics Laboratory	IAU · 32104
32105 Plesko	2000 KT_{52}	Cathy Plesko (born 1980), planetary scientist at Los Alamos National Laboratory	IAU · 32105
32106 Dawngraninger	2000 KD_{58}	Dawn Graininger (born 1989), scientist at the Johns Hopkins Applied Physics Laboratory	IAU · 32106
32107 Ylitalo	2000 KX_{64}	Maxwell Robert Ylitalo (born 1998) was awarded second place in the 2015 Intel International Science and Engineering Fair for his energy project.	JPL · 32107
32108 Jovanzhang	2000 KZ_{64}	Jovan Y. Zhang (born 1998) was awarded second place in the 2015 Intel International Science and Engineering Fair for his energy project.	JPL · 32108
32109 Brucksyal	2000 KQ_{70}	Megan Bruck Syal (born 1983), research scientist and planetary defense team lead at Lawrence Livermore National Laboratory	IAU · 32109
32110 Wendycaldwell	2000 KA_{73}	Wendy Caldwell (born 1982), research scientist at Los Alamos National Laboratory	IAU · 32110
32111 Mallorydecoster	2000 KD_{73}	Mallory Decoster (born 1989), scientist at the Johns Hopkins Applied Physics Laboratory	IAU · 32111
32112 Katiekumamoto	2000 KK_{73}	Kathryn Kumamoto (born 1990), researcher at Lawrence Livermore National Laboratory	IAU · 32112
32113 Mikeowen	2000 KP_{73}	Mike Owen (b. 1967), an American researcher.	IAU · 32113
32120 Stevezheng	2000 LC_{8}	Steve Daikai Zheng (born 1996) was awarded second place in the 2015 Intel International Science and Engineering Fair for his environmental engineering project.	JPL · 32120
32121 Joshuazhou	2000 LF_{9}	Joshua Zhou (born 1999) was awarded best of category award and first place in the 2015 Intel ISEF for his earth and environmental sciences project. He also received the Intel Foundation Cultural and Scientific Visit to China Award.	JPL · 32121
32128 Jayzussman	2000 LL_{13}	Jay Wolf Zussman (born 1997) was awarded second place in the 2015 Intel International Science and Engineering Fair for his cellular and molecular biology project.	JPL · 32128
32131 Ravindran	2000 LQ_{16}	Pavithran T. Ravindran (born 1997) was awarded second place in the 2015 Intel International Science and Engineering Fair for his chemistry project.	JPL · 32131
32132 Andrewamini	2000 LS_{16}	Andrew Ethridge Amini (born 1998), a finalist in the 2016 Intel Science Talent Search, a science competition for high school seniors, for his computational biology and bioinformatics project.	JPL · 32132
32142 Tristanguillot	2000 LU_{26}	Tristan Guillot (b. 1970), a French astronomer.	IAU · 32142
32144 Humes	2000 LA_{29}	Oriel Humes (born 1996), American astronomer and Northern Arizona University Ph.D. recipient	IAU · 32144
32145 Katberman	2000 LE_{30}	Katharine Barr Berman (born 1998), a finalist in the 2016 Intel Science Talent Search, a science competition for high school seniors, for her cellular and molecular biology project.	JPL · 32145
32146 Paigebrown	2000 LF_{30}	Paige Brown (born 1998), a finalist in the 2016 Intel Science Talent Search, a science competition for high school seniors, for her environmental science project.	JPL · 32146
32150 Crumpton	2000 LJ_{31}	Rev. Ian Spencer Crumpton (1940-2022), New Zealander who served as president of the Canterbury Astronomical Society	IAU · 32150
32151 Seanmarshall	2000 LX_{31}	Sean Marshall (born 1987) is a postdoctoral research scientist at Arecibo Observatory in Puerto Rico, USA. He studies near-Earth asteroids using radar and lightcurve observations to find their sizes, shapes, and rotation states, adding infrared observations to find their thermal properties.	IAU · 32151
32152 Hyland	2000 LK_{34}	Méabh Hyland (born 1992), Irish astronomer and Queen's University Belfast Ph.D. recipient	IAU · 32152
32153 Laurenmcgraw	2000 LM_{34}	Lauren McGraw (born 1992), American planetary astronomer specializing in water distribution on near-Earth asteroids	IAU · 32153
32163 Claireburch	2000 MZ_{5}	Claire Bernadette Burch (born 1998), a finalist in the 2016 Intel Science Talent Search, a science competition for high school seniors, for her space science project.	JPL · 32163
32184 Yamaura	2000 NC_{20}	Yuichi Yamaura (born 1955), a Japanese scientist and one of the leaders of the National Space Development Agency of Japan. He contributed greatly to the construction of the Bisei Spaceguard Center.	JPL · 32184
32185 Noonan	2000 ND_{23}	John Noonan (born 1994), American planetary scientist and University of Arizona Ph.D. recipient	IAU · 32185
32186 McMullan	2000 NM_{23}	Sarah McMullan (born 1992), British planetary scientist, leader of the group responsible for recovering the Winchcombe meteorite	IAU · 32186
32191 Bensharkey	2000 NZ_{26}	Benjamin Sharkey (born 1994), American astronomer at the University of Maryland, College Park	IAU · 32191
32194 Mahlke	2000 NY_{27}	Max Mahlke (b. 1992), a German planetary scientist.	IAU · 32194
32197 Judylynnpalmer	2000 OV	Judy Lynn Palmer (b. 1954), an American biostatician.	IAU · 32197
32200 Seiicyoshida	2000 OT_{2}	Seiichi Yoshida (born 1974), a Japanese astronomer who started the MISAO (Multitudinous Image-based Sky-survey and Accumulative Observations) project. He has contributed to the discovery of variable stars and studies photometric observations of comets.	JPL · 32200

== 32201–32300 ==
back to top

Named minor planet	Provisional	This minor planet was named for...	Ref · Catalog
32201 Heathermckay	2000 OZ_{2}	Heather McKay, retired Australian squash player	IAU · 32201
32202 Cogswell	2000 OA_{3}	Susan Cogswell, classmate of the discoverer at Rathvilly primary school in Birmingham, England, in the early 1960s.	IAU · 32202
32207 Mairepercy	2000 OQ_{7}	Maire Percy (born 1939) conducts research at the University of Toronto in risk factors for human disease. She identifies factors that could lead to the cure or prevention of human disorders, including diabetes, Alzheimer's disease and Alzheimer-like dementia in Down Syndrome. She is married to astronomer John R. Percy (Src).	JPL · 32207
32208 Johnpercy	2000 OR_{7}	John R. Percy (born 1941), a British-born professor of astronomy and astrophysics at the University of Toronto, has written over 400 scientific papers, articles and books on variable stars and astronomy education. His organizational affiliations span the globe, and his many awards reflect his dedicated support to astronomy education. (Src).	JPL · 32208
32213 Joshuachoe	2000 OE_{13}	Joshua Choe (born 1998), a finalist in the 2016 Intel Science Talent Search, a science competition for high school seniors, for his cellular and molecular biology project.	JPL · 32213
32214 Colburn	2000 OV_{15}	Thomas William Colburn (born 1998), a finalist in the 2016 Intel Science Talent Search, a science competition for high school seniors, for his chemistry project.	JPL · 32214
32217 Beverlyge	2000 OE_{18}	Beverly Ge (born 1998), a finalist in the 2016 Intel Science Talent Search, a science competition for high school seniors, for her materials science project.	JPL · 32217
32222 Charlesvest	2000 OD_{23}	Charles M. Vest (1941–2013), was an American educator and engineer who served as president of the Massachusetts Institute of Technology (MIT) from 1990 to 2004.	JPL · 32222
32226 Vikulgupta	2000 OQ_{23}	Vikul Gupta (born 1998), a finalist in the 2016 Intel Science Talent Search, a science competition for high school seniors, for his computer science project.	JPL · 32226
32229 Higashino	2000 OX_{26}	Soon il Junko Higashino (born 1998), a finalist in the 2016 Intel Science Talent Search, a science competition for high school seniors, for her animal sciences project.	JPL · 32229
32233 Georgehou	2000 OZ_{29}	George Hou (born 1998), a finalist in the 2016 Intel Science Talent Search, a science competition for high school seniors, for his mathematics project.	JPL · 32233
32234 Jesslihuang	2000 OW_{31}	Jessica Li Huang (born 1998), a finalist in the 2016 Intel Science Talent Search, a science competition for high school seniors, for her behavioral and social sciences project.	JPL · 32234
32237 Jagadeesan	2000 OA_{37}	Meena Jagadeesan (born 1998), a finalist in the 2016 Intel Science Talent Search, a science competition for high school seniors, for her mathematics project.	JPL · 32237
32242 Jagota	2000 OE_{40}	Milind Jagota (born 1998), a finalist in the 2016 Intel Science Talent Search, a science competition for high school seniors, for his materials science project.	JPL · 32242
32250 Karthik	2000 OF_{46}	Anjini Karthik (born 1998), a finalist in the 2016 Intel Science Talent Search, a science competition for high school seniors, for her materials science project.	JPL · 32250
32260 Schult	2000 OG_{57}	Carsten Schult (born 1987) is a German atmospheric physicist who specializes in radar measurements of meteors for atmospheric and astronomical studies at the Leibniz-Institute of Atmospheric Physics in Kühlungsborn, Germany.	IAU · 32260
32261 Podlewskagaca	2000 OS_{58}	Edyta Podlewska-Gaca (b. 1981), a Polish researcher.	IAU · 32261
32262 Marinferrais	2000 OA_{60}	Marin Ferrais (b. 1993), a Belgian post-doctoral associate at the Arecibo Observatory.	IAU · 32262
32263 Kusnierkiewicz	2000 OH_{69}	David Yan Kusnierkiewicz (born 1955) served as mission systems engineer of the New Horizons Pluto Kuiper Belt mission. In this role he is making a fundamental contribution to the exploration of the Solar System.	JPL · 32263
32264 Cathjesslai	2000 PC_{1}	Catherine Jessica Yihui Lai (born 1998), a finalist in the 2016 Intel Science Talent Search, a science competition for high school seniors, for her medicine and health project.	JPL · 32264
32267 Hermannweyl	2000 PS_{1}	Hermann Weyl (1885–1955) was a German-American pure and applied mathematician. His work, from the study of the Riemann surface to the application of group theory to quantum mechanics, shows his ability to find connections between previously unrelated subjects.	JPL · 32267
32270 Inokuchihiroo	2000 PC_{4}	Hiroo Inokuchi (1927–2014) was a Japanese physicist who discovered the semiconductive properties in organic materials. He also contributed to the cultivation and development of research under microgravity. He is the chairman of Japan Space Forum, which manages Bisei Spaceguard Center.	JPL · 32270
32272 Hasegawayuya	2000 PV_{4}	Yuya Hasegawa, the prizewinner in the 2008 Space Day Award	JPL · 32272
32275 Limichael	2000 PS_{13}	Michael Yifan Li (born 1998), a finalist in the 2016 Intel Science Talent Search, a science competition for high school seniors, for his computational biology and bioinformatics project.	JPL · 32275
32276 Allenliu	2000 PV_{14}	Allen Liu (born 1999), a finalist in the 2016 Intel Science Talent Search, a science competition for high school seniors, for his mathematics project.	JPL · 32276
32277 Helenliu	2000 PE_{15}	Helen Liu (born 1998), a finalist in the 2016 Intel Science Talent Search, a science competition for high school seniors, for her medicine and health project.	JPL · 32277
32278 Makaram	2000 PU_{15}	Yashaswini Makaram (born 1998), a finalist in the 2016 Intel Science Talent Search, a science competition for high school seniors, for her computer science project.	JPL · 32278
32279 Marshall	2000 PX_{16}	Nathan Charles Marshall (born 1998) is a finalist in the 2016 Intel Science Talent Search, a science competition for high school seniors, for his earth and planetary science project. He attends the Boise High School, Boise, Idaho.	JPL · 32279
32280 Rachelmashal	2000 PF_{17}	Rachel Mashal (born 1998), a finalist in the 2016 Intel Science Talent Search, a science competition for high school seniors, for her animal sciences project.	JPL · 32280
32281 Shreyamenon	2000 PP_{21}	Shreya Menon (born 1998), a finalist in the 2016 Intel Science Talent Search, a science competition for high school seniors, for her cellular and molecular biology project.	JPL · 32281
32282 Arnoldmong	2000 PS_{23}	Arnold Mong (born 1998), a finalist in the 2016 Intel Science Talent Search, a science competition for high school seniors, for his physics project.	JPL · 32282
32288 Terui	2000 QN_{1}	Yoshihiro Terui, the winner of the 2008 Space Day Award essay competition	JPL · 32288
32294 Zajonc	2000 QN_{9}	Ivo Zajonc (born 1933), Czech zoologist and amateur astronomer, chair of the Nitra branch of the Slovak Union of Amateur Astronomers (SZAA), a member of the Jihlava Astronomical Society, and honorary fellow of the Slovak Astronomical Society	JPL · 32294
32295 Ravichandran	2000 QD_{10}	Kavya Ravichandran (born 1998), a finalist in the 2016 Intel Science Talent Search, a science competition for high school seniors, for her bioengineering project.	JPL · 32295
32296 Aninsayana	2000 QY_{10}	Anin Sayana (born 1998), a finalist in the 2016 Intel Science Talent Search, a science competition for high school seniors, for his medicine and health project.	JPL · 32296
32298 Kunalshroff	2000 QD_{12}	Kunal Shroff (born 1998), a finalist in the 2016 Intel Science Talent Search (STS), a science competition for high school seniors, for his cellular and molecular biology project.	JPL · 32298
32299 Srinivas	2000 QD_{17}	Pranav Srinivas (born 1998), a finalist in the 2016 Intel Science Talent Search, a science competition for high school seniors, for his computational biology and bioinformatics project.	JPL · 32299
32300 Uwamanzunna	2000 QL_{20}	Augusta Uwamanzu-Nna (born 1998), a finalist in the 2016 Intel Science Talent Search, a science competition for high school seniors, for her engineering project.	JPL · 32300

== 32301–32400 ==
back to top

Named minor planet	Provisional	This minor planet was named for...	Ref · Catalog
32302 Mayavarma	2000 QO_{24}	Maya Varma (born 1998), a finalist in the 2016 Intel Science Talent Search, a science competition for high school seniors, for her engineering project	JPL · 32302
32308 Sreyavemuri	2000 QZ_{31}	Sreya Vemuri (born 1998), a finalist in the 2016 Intel Science Talent Search, a science competition for high school seniors, for her physics project.	JPL · 32308
32310 Asherwillner	2000 QY_{35}	Asher Justin Willner (born 1998), a finalist in the 2016 Intel Science Talent Search, a science competition for high school seniors, for his engineering project.	JPL · 32310
32311 Josephineyu	2000 QA_{38}	Josephine Jessica Yu (born 1998), a finalist in the 2016 Intel Science Talent Search, a science competition for high school seniors, for her physics project.	JPL · 32311
32313 Zhangmichael	2000 QO_{39}	Michael Zhang (born 1998), a finalist in the 2016 Intel Science Talent Search, a science competition for high school seniors, for his bioengineering project.	JPL · 32313
32314 Rachelzhang	2000 QO_{42}	Rachel Zhang (born 1998), a finalist in the 2016 Intel Science Talent Search, a science competition for high school seniors, for her mathematics project.	JPL · 32314
32315 Clarezhu	2000 QO_{43}	Clare Zhu, (born 1998), a finalist in the 2016 Intel Science Talent Search, a science competition for high school seniors, for her computational biochemistry project	JPL · 32315
32379 Markadame	2000 QR_{177}	Mark Adame, a mentor of a finalist in the 2016 Intel Science Talent Search (STS), a science competition for high school seniors.	JPL · 32379
32381 Bellomo	2000 QP_{185}	Vickie Bellomo, a mentor of a finalist in the 2016 Intel Science Talent Search (STS), a science competition for high school seniors.	JPL · 32381
32384 Scottbest	2000 QQ_{190}	Scott Best, a mentor of a finalist in the 2016 Intel Science Talent Search (STS), a science competition for high school seniors.	JPL · 32384
32387 D'Egidio	2000 QR_{193}	Michael D´Egidio, a mentor of a finalist in the 2016 Intel Science Talent Search (STS), a science competition for high school seniors.	JPL · 32387
32389 Michflannory	2000 QJ_{202}	Michelle Flannory, a mentor of a finalist in the 2016 Intel Science Talent Search (STS), a science competition for high school seniors.	JPL · 32389
32393 Galinato	2000 QT_{209}	Erin Galinato, a mentor of a finalist in the 2016 Intel Science Talent Search (STS), a science competition for high school seniors.	JPL · 32393
32398 Métayer	2000 QT_{218}	Robin Métayer (b. 1994), a French planetary scientist.	IAU · 32398
32399 Epifani	2000 QA_{219}	Elena Mazzotta Epifani (b. 1972), an Italian astronomer.	IAU · 32399
32400 Itaparica	2000 QK_{220}	The Observatório Astronômico do Sertão de Itaparica (OASI) is located in Itacuruba (PE) and is dedicated to the study of small Solar System studies. Its 1-m telescope, in operation since 2011, is the largest one in the northeastern region of Brazil.	IAU · 32400

== 32401–32500 ==
back to top

Named minor planet	Provisional	This minor planet was named for...	Ref · Catalog
32402 Annametke	2000 QF_{231}	Anna Metke (b. 1992), an American scientist.	IAU · 32402
32405 Jameshill	2000 RE_{1}	James Hill, a mentor of a finalist in the 2016 Intel Science Talent Search (STS), a science competition for high school seniors.	JPL · 32405
32406 Tracyhughes	2000 RE_{1}	Tracy Hughes, a mentor of a finalist in the 2016 Intel Science Talent Search (STS), a science competition for high school seniors.	JPL · 32406
32424 Caryjames	2000 RY_{62}	Cary James, a mentor of a finalist in the 2016 Intel Science Talent Search (STS), a science competition for high school seniors.	JPL · 32424
32428 Peterlangley	2000 RC_{75}	Peter Langley, a mentor of a finalist in the 2016 Intel Science Talent Search (STS), a science competition for high school seniors.	JPL · 32428
32432 Stansberry	2000 RT_{86}	John Stansberry (b. 1962), an American researcher.	IAU · 32432
32436 Eranofek	2000 RQ_{97}	Eran O. Ofek (born 1972), is an Israeli astrophysicist and a discoverer of minor planets at the Weizmann Institute of Science who studies transient phenomena on the outskirts of the Solar System.	IAU · 32436
32438 Wonyonghan	2000 RW_{98}	Won-Yong Han (b. 1956), a Korean researcher.	IAU · 32438
32439 Sangjoonkim	2000 RO_{99}	Sang-Joon Kim (b. 1952), a Korean professor at Kyung Hee University.	IAU · 32439
32441 Youngrokkim	2000 RO_{100}	Young-Rok Kim (1977–2022), a Korean astronomer.	IAU · 32441
32442 Heejaelee	2000 RS_{100}	Hee-Jae Lee (b. 1990), a Korean postdoctoral researcher at the Korea Astronomy and Space Science Institute	IAU · 32442
32443 Davidhaack	2000 RD_{101}	David Haack (b. 1982), a German scientist.	IAU · 32443
32449 Crystalmiller	2000 SR_{16}	Crystal Miller, a mentor of a finalist in the 2016 Intel Science Talent Search (STS), a science competition for high school seniors.	JPL · 32449
32453 Kanamishogo	2000 SF_{42}	Kanami Yoshimi and Shogo Yoshimi are the discoverer's daughter and son	JPL · 32453
32462 Janmitchener	2000 SU_{112}	Jan Mitchener, a mentor of a finalist in the 2016 Intel Science Talent Search (STS), a science competition for high school seniors.	JPL · 32462
32481 Inasaridze	2000 SF_{352}	Raguli Ya. Inasaridze (b. 1950), a Georgian astronomer.	IAU · 32481
32483 Kumar	2000 SM_{362}	Kumar Venkataramani (b. 1989), an Indian astronomer.	IAU · 32483
32486 Leospohl	2000 TY_{56}	Leos Pohl (b. 1981), a Czech Research Scientist at the University of Central Florida (Orlando, Florida).	IAU · 32486
32487 Eschrig	2000 TM_{61}	Jolantha Eschrig (b. 1995), a German planetary scientist.	IAU · 32487
32496 Deïopites	2000 WX_{182}	Deïopites, wounded in battle by Odysseus.	IAU · 32496

== 32501–32600 ==
back to top

Named minor planet	Provisional	This minor planet was named for...	Ref · Catalog
32516 Simoneieva	2001 OH_{46}	Simone Ieva (b. 1986), an Italian researcher.	IAU · 32516
32518 Ktramesh	2001 OZ_{69}	Kaliat “K. T.” Ramesh (b. 1959), an American Professor of Science and Engineering at Johns Hopkins University	IAU · 32518
32519 Timholt	2001 OB_{73}	Timothy R. Holt (b. 1983), an Australian planetary scientist.	IAU · 32519
32520 Jontihorner	2001 OG_{73}	Jonti Horner (b. 1978), a British-Australian astronomer.	IAU · 32520
32522 Judiepersons	2001 OE_{81}	Judie Persons, a mentor of a finalist in the 2016 Intel Science Talent Search (STS), a science competition for high school seniors.	JPL · 32522
32524 Roberthowie	2001 OC_{85}	Robert Howie (b. 1989), an Australian research engineer.	IAU · 32524
32525 Kynanhughson	2001 OZ_{85}	Kynan Hughson (b. 1991), a Canadian planetary scientist.	IAU · 32525
32527 Junko	2001 OS_{104}	Junko Baba (born 1978) is an administrative associate at the National Astronomical Observatory of Japan. She has organized international collaborative programs promoting studies of asteroids in Uzbekistan, South Korea, Taiwan, and Japan.	IAU · 32527
32531 Ulrikababiaková	2001 PG_{13}	Ulrika Babiaková (1976–2002), Slovak astronomer, was interested in interplanetary matter and asteroid photometry, as well as teaching and the popularization of astronomy. She was the wife of the discoverer and died in an accident aged 26.	JPL · 32531
32532 Thereus	2001 PT_{13}	Thereus, mythological centaur, a hunter who captured bears and carried them home, alive and struggling	JPL · 32532
32533 Tranpham	2001 PS_{29}	Tran Pham, a mentor of a finalist in the 2016 Intel Science Talent Search, a science competition for high school seniors.	JPL · 32533
32544 Debjaniroy	2001 QY_{11}	Debjani Roy, a mentor of a finalist in the 2016 Intel Science Talent Search (STS), a science competition for high school seniors.	JPL · 32544
32547 Shandroff	2001 QW_{14}	Melissa Shandroff, a mentor of a finalist in the 2016 Intel Science Talent Search (STS), a science competition for high school seniors.	JPL · 32547
32549 Taricco	2001 QA_{19}	Angela Taricco, a mentor of a finalist in the 2016 Intel Science Talent Search (STS), a science competition for high school seniors.	JPL · 32549
32550 Sharonthomas	2001 QT_{19}	Sharon Thomas, a mentor of a finalist in the 2016 Intel Science Talent Search (STS), a science competition for high school seniors.	JPL · 32550
32552 Jennithomas	2001 QU_{23}	Jennifer Thomas, a mentor of a finalist in the 2016 Intel Science Talent Search (STS), a science competition for high school seniors.	JPL · 32552
32556 Jennivibber	2001 QH_{30}	Jennifer Vibber, a mentor of a finalist in the 2016 Intel Science Talent Search (STS), a science competition for high school seniors.	JPL · 32556
32561 Waldron	2001 QE_{38}	Melissa Waldron, a mentor of a finalist in the 2016 Intel Science Talent Search (STS), a science competition for high school seniors.	JPL · 32561
32562 Caseywarner	2001 QA_{45}	Casey Warner, a mentor of a finalist in the 2016 Intel Science Talent Search (STS), a science competition for high school seniors.	JPL · 32562
32563 Nicolezaidi	2001 QA_{53}	Nicole Zaidi, a mentor of a finalist in the 2016 Intel Science Talent Search (STS), a science competition for high school seniors.	JPL · 32563
32564 Glass	2001 QM_{68}	Eugene Glass, American amateur astronomer	JPL · 32564
32569 Deming	2001 QW_{71}	Leo Deming, American amateur astronomer, one of the founders of the original observatory at Rose-Hulman (the discovery site)	JPL · 32569
32570 Peruindiana	2001 QZ_{71}	The "circus capital of the world" Peru, Indiana, hometown of the American discoverer Chris Wolfe	JPL · 32570
32571 Brayton	2001 QA_{72}	Scott Brayton, American car racer	JPL · 32571
32579 Allendavia	2001 QJ_{97}	Davia Elizabeth LeXin Allen (born 2002), a finalist in the 2016 Broadcom MASTERS, a math and science competition for middle school students, for her animal science project.	JPL · 32579
32580 Avbalasingam	2001 QY_{97}	Akhilesh Varadan Balasingam (born 2003), a finalist in the 2016 Broadcom MASTERS, a math and science competition for middle school students, for his energy and sustainability project.	JPL · 32580
32582 Mayachandar	2001 QW_{101}	Maya Sruti Chandar (born 2003), a finalist in the 2016 Broadcom MASTERS, a math and science competition for middle school students, for her animal science project.	JPL · 32582
32584 Michaelcollins	2001 QW_{105}	Michael Collins (b. 1957), an Electronics Specialist and longtime occultation chaser at Lowell Observatory, USA.	IAU · 32584
32585 Tardivel	2001 QQ_{107}	Simon Tardivel (b. 1987), a French researcher at CNES (France).	IAU · 32585
32590 Cynthiachen	2001 QF_{130}	Cynthia Chen (born 2002), a finalist in the 2016 Broadcom MASTERS, a math and science competition for middle school students, for her environmental and earth sciences project.	JPL · 32590
32593 Crotty	2001 QK_{138}	Brendan Joseph Crotty (born 2002), a finalist in the 2016 Broadcom MASTERS, a math and science competition for middle school students, for his materials & bioengineering project.	JPL · 32593
32594 Nathandeng	2001 QV_{141}	Nathan K. Deng (born 2002), a finalist in the 2016 Broadcom MASTERS, a math and science competition for middle school students, for his chemistry project.	JPL · 32594
32596 Čepek	2001 QS_{154}	Aleš Čepek (born 1954) is a professor at the Department of Mapping and Cartography, Faculty of Civil Engineering of the Czech Technical University in Prague. He is the author of project GNU Gama and the editor-in-chief of Geoinformatics FCE CTU Journal.	JPL · 32596
32597 Alicelucchetti	2001 QC_{157}	Alice Lucchetti (b. 1989), an Italian research scientist.	IAU · 32597
32598 Vanialorenzi	2001 QN_{159}	Vania Lorenzi (b. 1973), an Italian astronomer.	IAU · 32598
32599 Pedromachado	2001 QL_{160}	Pedro Mota Machado (b. 1967), a Portuguese professor at the Institute of Astrophysics and Space Science (Lisbon).	IAU · 32599

== 32601–32700 ==
back to top

Named minor planet	Provisional	This minor planet was named for...	Ref · Catalog
32603 Ariaeppinger	2001 QL_{199}	Aria Rosalee Eppinger (born 2001), a finalist in the 2016 Broadcom MASTERS, a math and science competition for middle school students, for her medicine and health sciences project.	JPL · 32603
32604 Meganmansfield	2001 QP_{212}	Megan Mansfield (b. 1994), an American astronomer.	IAU · 32604
32605 Lucy	2001 QM_{213}	Lucy, nickname of AL 288-1, the 3.2 million years old, 40-percent-complete Australopithecus afarensis skeleton discovered in 1974 by the International Afar Research Expedition in the Awash Valley of Ethiopia's Afar Depression	JPL · 32605
32606 Markkanen	2001 QY_{217}	Johannes Markkanen (b. 1984), a Finnish postdoctoral researcher at the Technical University of Braunschweig (Germany)	IAU · 32606
32607 Portell	2001 QH_{220}	Jordi Portell (b. 1975), a Spanish interface engineer.	IAU · 32607
32608 Hallas	2001 QA_{231}	Tony Hallas (born 1945) trained as a professional photographer and is one of the finest astroimagers. His photographs have appeared in books, magazines, and on products such as Apple's OS-X Lion operating system. He developed many imageprocessing techniques, which he has shared in articles and on DVDs.	JPL · 32608
32609 Jamesfagan	2001 QF_{243}	James Dana Fagan (born 2006), a finalist in the 2016 Broadcom MASTERS, a math and science competition for middle school students, for his physics project	JPL · 32609
32610 Siennafink	2001 QA_{245}	Sienna Nicole Fink (born 2002), a finalist in the 2016 Broadcom MASTERS, a math and science competition for middle school students, for her physics project.	JPL · 32610
32611 Ananyaganesh	2001 QB_{253}	Ananya Lakshmi Ganesh (born 2001), a finalist in the 2016 Broadcom MASTERS, a math and science competition for middle school students, for her medicine and health sciences project.	JPL · 32611
32612 Ghatare	2001 QA_{256}	Adishree Ghatare (born 2002), a finalist in the 2016 Broadcom MASTERS, a math and science competition for middle school students, for her computer science and software engineering project.	JPL · 32612
32613 Tseyuenman	2001 QU_{265}	Tse Yuen Man Joanna (1968–2003) was a Respiratory Medicine specialist doctor in Hong Kong. She died on duty while serving patients during the SARS epidemics in 2003. Her bravery and kindness as a physician has touched the hearts of many people.	JPL · 32613
32614 Hacegarcia	2001 QY_{266}	Joaquin Hace Garcia (born 2002), a finalist in the 2016 Broadcom MASTERS, a math and science competition for middle school students, for his electrical and mechanical engineering project.	JPL · 32614
32616 Nadinehan	2001 QH_{279}	Nadine Han (born 2003), a finalist in the 2016 Broadcom MASTERS, a math and science competition for middle school students, for her environmental and earth sciences project.	JPL · 32616
32617 Tiegs	2001 QY_{283}	Jake Tiegs (b. 1972), the Mechanical Technician II for the Lowell Discovery Telescope and Safety Officer for Lowell Observatory, USA	IAU · 32617
32618 Leungkamcheung	2001 QL_{293}	Leungkamcheung (born 1956) is a former president of the Hong Kong Astronomical Society.	JPL · 32618
32619 Lynnsawyer	2001 QC_{295}	Lynn Sawyer (b. 1961), the Philanthropy Assistant at Lowell Observatory located in the USA.	IAU · 32619
32621 Talcott	2001 RZ	Richard Talcott (born 1954) joined the staff of Astronomy magazine in early 1986. Since then, he has written hundreds of feature articles on both the science of astronomy and observing the night sky in addition to editing the popular Sky This Month section. Rich also has authored or co-authored several astronomy books.	JPL · 32621
32622 Yuewaichun	2001 RZ_{16}	Yue Wai-Chun (born 1954), a veteran amateur astronomer, was the coordinator of IOTA China division. He had made tremendous contribution to astronomy in numerous ways, including distributing daily astronomy news through Hong Kong Astronomical Society's smart phone apps to tens of thousands of astronomy lovers.	JPL · 32622
32623 Samuelkahn	2001 RV_{23}	Samuel Bennett Kahn (born 2002), a finalist in the 2016 Broadcom MASTERS, a math and science competition for middle school students, for his environmental and earth sciences project.	JPL · 32623
32628 Lazorik	2001 RK_{70}	Olivia Jane Lazorik (born 2001), a finalist in the 2016 Broadcom MASTERS, a math and science competition for middle school students, for her animal science project.	JPL · 32628
32630 Ethanlevy	2001 RZ_{71}	Ethan Zvi Levy (born 2002), a finalist in the 2016 Broadcom MASTERS, a math and science competition for middle school students, for his medicine and health sciences project.	JPL · 32630
32631 Majzoub	2001 RS_{74}	Omar Majzoub (born 2002), a finalist in the 2016 Broadcom MASTERS, a math and science competition for middle school students, for his physics project.	JPL · 32631
32633 Honguyang	2001 RY_{93}	Hongu Yang (born 1980) is a postdoctoral researcher at Korea Astronomy and Space Science Institute (Daejeon, South Korea). He studies dynamical evolution of dust particles, in particular from comets to the inner solar system.	IAU · 32633
32634 Sonjamichaluk	2001 RU_{103}	Sonja Morgan Simon Michaluk (born 2003), a finalist in the 2016 Broadcom MASTERS, a math and science competition for middle school students, for her environmental and earth sciences project.	JPL · 32634

== 32701–32800 ==
back to top

Named minor planet	Provisional	This minor planet was named for...	Ref · Catalog
32720 Simoeisios	2131 T-3	Simoeisios, young Trojan hero killed by Ajax during the Trojan War	JPL · 32720
32724 Woerlitz	4029 T-3	Gartenreich Dessau-Wörlitz (Garden Kingdom of Dessau-Wörlitz), near Dessau, Germany, an exceptional example of eighteenth-century landscape design and a UNESCO World Heritage site	JPL · 32724
32726 Chromios	4179 T-3	Chromios, son of Priam, killed by Diomedes during the Trojan War	JPL · 32726
32730 Lamarr	1951 RX	Hedy Lamarr (1914–2000) was an Austrian-American inventor and actress. Along with George Antheil, she developed technology for a radio guidance system to assist the Allied war effort in WWII. These technologies are used in current Bluetooth systems.	JPL · 32730
32731 Annaivanovna	1968 OD_{1}	Anna Ivanovna Plyugina, specialist in fundamental astrometry at the Pulkovo Observatory	JPL · 32731
32734 Kryukov	1978 RM	Vladimir Vladimirovich Kryukov, Russian electrical engineer	JPL · 32734
32735 Strekalov	1978 SX_{4}	Gennady Mikhailovich Strekalov (1940–2004), a Russian cosmonaut.	JPL · 32735
32766 Voskresenskoe	1982 UY_{7}	Voskresenskoe is an urban settlement, the center of the Voskresenskoe region of the Nizhnij Novgorod province and home of the discoverer's parents. The first documented mention of the settlement dates back to 1614.	JPL · 32766
32768 Alexandripatov	1983 RZ_{4}	Alexandr V. Ipatov (born 1945) is the director of the Institute of Applied Astronomy of the Russian Academy of Sciences.	JPL · 32768
32770 Starchik	1984 YY_{1}	Boris Stepanovich Starchik, Ukrainian engineer, builder, traveller, forester, and defender of nature	JPL · 32770
32776 Nriag	1987 KG_{5}	National Research Institute of Astronomy and Geophysics (NRIAG), Helwan, Egypt	JPL · 32776
32796 Ehrenfest	1990 ET_{2}	Paul Ehrenfest, 19th–20th-century Jewish-Austrian physicist	JPL · 32796

== 32801–32900 ==
back to top

Named minor planet	Provisional	This minor planet was named for...	Ref · Catalog
32807 Quarenghi	1990 SN_{28}	Jacomo Quarenghi, Italian architect, who designed the Hermitage theater, the Smolny Institute, the Guards' Manège (all in St. Petersburg) and the Alexandre Palace (in Tsarskoye Selo)	JPL · 32807
32808 Bischoff	1990 TP_{2}	Werner Bischoff, researcher at Carl Zeiss, Jena was engaged in designing the large Hamburg	JPL · 32808
32809 Sommerfeld	1990 TJ_{10}	Arnold Sommerfeld, German physics professor	JPL · 32809
32810 Steinbach	1990 TS_{10}	Manfred Steinbach, professor of precision instrument design for astronomical, geophysical and space applications at Carl Zeiss, Jena	JPL · 32810
32811 Apisaon	1990 TP_{12}	Apisaon, son of Phausios, Trojan warrior who fought against the approaching Aias but was transfixed and deprived of his armor by Eurypylus	JPL · 32811
32815 Mitsufumi	1991 GK_{1}	Mitsufumi Nishimura, specialist in astronomical telescope design.	IAU · 32815
32821 Posch	1991 RC_{3}	Manfred Posch, chief editor of an Austrian newspaper	JPL · 32821
32853 Döbereiner	1992 SF_{2}	Johann Wolfgang Döbereiner, German professor of chemistry	JPL · 32853
32854 Sekitakayuki	1992 SC_{13}	Description available (see ref). Please summarize in your own words.	IAU · 32854
32855 Zollitsch	1992 SF_{17}	Robert Zollitsch, archbishop of Freiburg	JPL · 32855
32858 Kitakamigawa	1993 BA_{3}	Kitakamigawa is the largest river in the Tohoku district, flowing from Iwate to Miyagi prefecture.	JPL · 32858
32890 Schwob	1994 AL_{1}	Pierre R. Schwob (born 1946), American-Swiss software engineer and amateur astronomer	JPL · 32890
32891 Amatrice	1994 CE_{1}	Amatrice is an Italian mountain village located in the region of Latium. The village, world-famous for the pasta sauce Amatriciana, was destroyed by the earthquake of 2016 August 24.	JPL · 32891
32892 Prufrock	1994 DW	The Love Song of J. Alfred Prufrock and its eponymous narrator known as "Prufrock", a poem by American-born British poet T. S. Eliot. The poem is often referenced in popular culture.	JPL · 32892
32893 van der Waals	1994 EM_{6}	Johannes Diderik van der Waals, 19th–20th-century Dutch physicist, thermodynamicist, and Nobelist	JPL · 32893
32897 Curtharris	1994 PD	Curtis Harris, amateur astronomer in Anguilla	JPL · 32897
32899 Knigge	1994 PY_{1}	Adolph Freiherr Knigge (1752–1796), German author and translator	JPL · 32899

== 32901–33000 ==
back to top

Named minor planet	Provisional	This minor planet was named for...	Ref · Catalog
32909 Uemuramahito	1994 TS	Description available (see ref). Please summarize in your own words.	IAU · 32909
32911 Cervara	1994 VX	Cervara di Roma, an Italian mountain village located in the Simbruini Regional Park in the region of Latium.	JPL · 32911
32919 Ohashi	1995 CJ_{1}	Masatake Ohashi, the former Director of the KAGRA Observatory of the Institute for Cosmic Ray Research (University of Tokyo)	IAU · 32919
32928 Xiejialin	1995 QZ	Xie Jialin (1920–2016), Chinese physicist and member of Chinese Academy of Sciences.	JPL · 32928
32931 Ferioli	1995 SY_{4}	Luigi Ferioli (born 1938), an Italian amateur astronomer and enthusiastic popularizer of astronomy, a skillful maker of telescopes and sundials, and author of Appunti di ottica astronomica ("Notes on astronomical optics").	JPL · 32931
32938 Ivanopaci	1995 TP_{2}	Ivano Paci (born 1932), Italian professor, who provided crucial support to the development of the Pistoia Mountains Astronomical Observatory.	JPL · 32938
32939 Nasimi	1995 UN_{2}	Imadaddin Nasimi (1369–1417) was a mystical poet who wrote in Azerbaijani, Persian and Arabic. Nasimi wrote two collections of poetry (divans) and a number of poems. In his poetry he expressed both Sufi and Hurufi sentiments. His lyrical and elegant style makes him one of the most prominent early divan masters.	JPL · 32939
32943 Sandyryan	1995 VK_{2}	Sandy Ryan, American provider of technical support to the AMOS team	JPL · 32943
32944 Gussalli	1995 WC_{3}	Luigi Gussalli (1885–1950), an Italian mechanical engineer and space-vehicle propulsion designer (Src).	MPC · 32944
32945 Lecce	1995 WR_{5}	Lecce, in southern Italy, is the capital of the province of Lecce. Because of the rich Baroque architectural monuments found in the city, it is commonly nicknamed "The Florence of the South". The city also has a long traditional affinity with Greek culture going back to its foundation.	JPL · 32945
32969 Motohikosato	1996 PP_{9}	Motohiko Sato (born 1939) organized the Yamagata Astronomical Society in 1961 and actively popularizes astronomy.	JPL · 32969
32987 Uyuni	1996 XB_{9}	Salar de Uyuni is by far the largest salty expanse on the planet, located high in the southern Andes of Bolivia	JPL · 32987
32990 Sayo-hime	1996 YD_{3}	Sayo-hime is the female protagonist of a love story, written around the sixth century, in which a young man heads off to the Korean peninsula. This tragic love story was included in Japan's oldest collection of waka poetry, the Manyohshu.	JPL · 32990
33000 Chenjiansheng	1997 CJ_{28}	Jiansheng Chen (born 1938), a Chinese astrophysicist who contributed to the development of modern astronomy in China.	JPL · 33000

back to top

Preceded by 31,001–32,000	Meanings of minor-planet names List of minor planets: 32,001–33,000	Succeeded by 33,001–34,000
