= Naoto Satō =

Japanese astronomer

Minor planets discovered: 142
see § Discoveries of minor planets

Naoto Satō (佐藤 直人, Satō Naoto; born 1953) is a Japanese amateur astronomer, discoverer of minor planets, and, by profession, a junior high school science teacher. As a planetarian, a member of the professional staff of a planetarium, he has done much for the spread of astronomy in Japan through speaking on planetaria and the results of astronomical observation.

In 2001, while working as support staff at JK1ZAM, the club station of Iruma Children’s Center (an educational institution for children in Iruma City), he helped achieve the first ARISS school contact in Japan. Also, in 2003, as a coordinating teacher, he helped accomplish the first solo contact between a junior high school in Japan and the ISS, with the support of JK1ZAM. He regularly spoke on the astronomical talk program Sunset Café at the local radio station "FM CHAPPY 77.7" from December 2006 to November 2008. He held the position of vice-director on the board of the Saitama Planetarium Liaison Council (2007–2008). He supports ARISS (Amateur Radio on the International Space Station), which is a program that offers students an opportunity to experience the excitement of amateur radio by talking directly with crew members of the ISS (International Space Station).

The Eos main-belt asteroid 6025 Naotosato, which Takeshi Urata discovered in 1992, was named after him.

== Discoveries of minor planets ==
Since 1995, Satō has discovered a large number of minor planets from his own Chichibu Astronomical Observatory at Chichibu, including asteroids such as 7038 Tokorozawa, 7851 Azumino, 8581 Johnen, 8924 Iruma, 9418 Mayumi and 118230 Sado. He is ranked among the top 50 asteroid discoverers in the world (The Astronomy Yearbook – 2008). The Minor Planet Center credits him with the discovery of 142 minor planets during 1995–1998, of which 18 were co-discoveries with astronomer Takeshi Urata (also see table). Naoto Satō is also known for the prediscovery of C/1989 Y2, a parabolic comet credited to McKenzie–Russell.

=== List ===
7038 Tokorozawa	22 February 1995	list^{[A]}
7851 Azumino	29 December 1996	list
8581 Johnen	28 December 1996	list
8924 Iruma	14 December 1996	list
8933 Kurobe	6 January 1997	list
9230 Yasuda	29 December 1996	list
9418 Mayumi	18 November 1995	list^{[A]}
10224 Hisashi	26 October 1997	list
10880 Kaguya	6 November 1996	list
10916 Okina-Ouna	31 December 1997	list
(11114) 1995 WV_{5}	16 November 1995	list^{[A]}
(11607) 1995 WX_{1}	16 November 1995	list^{[A]}
12027 Masaakitanaka	3 January 1997	list
12031 Kobaton	30 January 1997	list
12432 Usuda	12 January 1996	list^{[A]}
12456 Genichiaraki	2 January 1997	list
12460 Mando	3 January 1997	list
12469 Katsuura	9 January 1997	list
13188 Okinawa	3 January 1997	list
13654 Masuda	9 February 1997	list
(13694) 1997 WW_{7}	23 November 1997	list
15884 Maspalomas	27 February 1997	list
15916 Shigeoyamada	25 October 1997	list
(16716) 1995 UX_{6}	21 October 1995	list^{[A]}
16723 Fumiofuke	27 November 1995	list^{[A]}

16790 Yuuzou	2 January 1997	list
16796 Shinji	6 February 1997	list
16826 Daisuke	19 November 1997	list
16853 Masafumi	21 December 1997	list
17612 Whiteknight	20 October 1995	list^{[A]}
17656 Hayabusa	6 November 1996	list
17657 Himawari	6 November 1996	list
(17666) 1996 XR	1 December 1996	list
18469 Hakodate	20 October 1995	list^{[A]}
(18488) 1996 AY_{3}	13 January 1996	list^{[A]}
18520 Wolfratshausen	6 November 1996	list
18553 Kinkakuji	6 January 1997	list
20193 Yakushima	18 January 1997	list
21250 Kamikouchi	17 December 1995	list
21302 Shirakamisanchi	1 December 1996	list
21348 Toyoteru	1 March 1997	list
22470 Shirakawa-go	9 February 1997	list
(23586) 1995 TA_{1}	13 October 1995	list^{[A]}
23628 Ichimura	8 December 1996	list
(23630) 1996 YA_{3}	30 December 1996	list
23638 Nagano	6 January 1997	list
23649 Tohoku	1 February 1997	list
(23963) 1998 WY_{8}	18 November 1998	list
25302 Niim	9 December 1998	list
26223 Enari	3 December 1997	list

(26224) 1997 XF_{2}	3 December 1997	list
(26902) 1995 YR	17 December 1995	list^{[A]}
26990 Culbertson	23 November 1997	list
26998 Iriso	25 December 1997	list
27918 Azusagawa	6 November 1996	list
27982 Atsushimiyazaki	26 October 1997	list
27991 Koheijimiura	6 November 1997	list
27997 Bandos	23 November 1997	list
28173 Hisakichi	11 November 1998	list
28174 Harue	12 November 1998	list
29420 Ikuo	9 January 1997	list
(29421) 1997 AV_{18}	9 January 1997	list
29514 Karatsu	25 December 1997	list
(29644) 1998 VA_{33}	11 November 1998	list
(31075) 1996 XV	1 December 1996	list
(31083) 1996 XE_{32}	14 December 1996	list
(31084) 1996 YX_{2}	29 December 1996	list
31087 Oirase	9 January 1997	list
31095 Buneiou	27 February 1997	list
31179 Gongju	21 December 1997	list
(31199) 1998 AK_{3}	5 January 1998	list
(32984) 1996 XX	1 December 1996	list
32990 Sayo-hime	30 December 1996	list
(32998) 1997 CK_{5}	1 February 1997	list
(33070) 1997 WY_{7}	23 November 1997	list

(33088) 1997 XX_{9}	3 December 1997	list
(33096) 1997 YS_{6}	25 December 1997	list
(35322) 1997 CX_{16}	6 February 1997	list
(35400) 1997 YU_{2}	21 December 1997	list
(35401) 1997 YW_{2}	21 December 1997	list
(37743) 1996 XQ	1 December 1996	list
(37746) 1996 XD_{32}	14 December 1996	list
(39818) 1997 YR_{4}	24 December 1997	list
(43919) 1996 BG_{3}	18 January 1996	list^{[A]}
(43949) 1997 AU_{18}	9 January 1997	list
(44012) 1997 UL_{22}	26 October 1997	list
(48734) 1997 CZ_{16}	6 February 1997	list
(52479) 1995 TZ	13 October 1995	list^{[A]}
(52546) 1996 XW	1 December 1996	list
(52550) 1996 YB_{3}	30 December 1996	list
(52623) 1997 VY_{6}	6 November 1997	list
(52629) 1997 WA_{8}	23 November 1997	list
(53019) 1998 VW_{32}	11 November 1998	list
(55883) 1997 WF_{8}	23 November 1997	list
(58410) 1995 YS	17 December 1995	list^{[A]}
(58613) 1997 UN_{7}	25 October 1997	list
(58614) 1997 UO_{7}	25 October 1997	list
(58619) 1997 UF_{22}	26 October 1997	list
(58620) 1997 UG_{22}	26 October 1997	list
(58662) 1997 XJ_{2}	3 December 1997	list

(58667) 1997 YS_{2}	21 December 1997	list
(65838) 1996 XD_{26}	8 December 1996	list
(69411) 1995 UR_{8}	21 October 1995	list^{[A]}
(69482) 1996 XC_{26}	8 December 1996	list
(69486) 1997 AM_{1}	2 January 1997	list
(69490) 1997 AE_{5}	3 January 1997	list
(69562) 1997 YU_{6}	25 December 1997	list
(73867) 1997 AH_{1}	2 January 1997	list
(73968) 1997 YQ_{4}	24 December 1997	list
(90880) 1996 WZ_{2}	30 November 1996	list
(90883) 1996 XB_{26}	8 December 1996	list
(90951) 1997 VX_{6}	6 November 1997	list
(90955) 1997 WB_{2}	19 November 1997	list
(90982) 1997 XE_{2}	3 December 1997	list
(96319) 1997 CL_{5}	1 February 1997	list
(96321) 1997 CW_{16}	6 February 1997	list
(96368) 1997 XH_{2}	3 December 1997	list
(96369) 1997 XM_{2}	3 December 1997	list
(96372) 1997 YP_{4}	24 December 1997	list
(100389) 1995 WU_{8}	24 November 1995	list^{[A]}
(100499) 1996 XP	1 December 1996	list
(100689) 1997 YW_{6}	25 December 1997	list
(100703) 1998 AL_{3}	5 January 1998	list
(101431) 1998 VX_{32}	11 November 1998	list
118230 Sado	30 November 1996	list

(120665) 1996 XT	1 December 1996	list
120741 Iijimayuichi	26 October 1997	list
(120974) 1998 WW_{8}	18 November 1998	list
(129600) 1997 WZ_{1}	19 November 1997	list
136743 Echigo	16 November 1995	list^{[A]}
(136790) 1996 YV_{2}	29 December 1996	list
(160025) 1996 XS	1 December 1996	list
(162144) 1998 VZ_{32}	11 November 1998	list
(164696) 1997 WB_{8}	23 November 1997	list
(175768) 1998 VB_{33}	11 November 1998	list
(192452) 1997 YQ_{2}	21 December 1997	list
(200141) 1997 XZ_{1}	3 December 1997	list
(210489) 1997 AB_{22}	15 January 1997	list
(251709) 1997 AA_{5}	2 January 1997	list
(269706) 1997 WX_{7}	23 November 1997	list
(297291) 1997 XG_{2}	3 December 1997	list
(336762) 2011 AG_{27}	31 December 1997	list
Co-discovery made with:^{A} T. Urata

== See also ==
- List of minor planet discoverers
