= 31179 Gongju =

Stony main-belt asteroid

Discovery
- Discovered by: N. Sato
- Discovery site: Chichibu Obs.
- Discovery date: 21 December 1997

Designations
- Named after: Gongju (South Korean city)
- Alternative designations: 1997 YR_{2} · 1989 TM_{9} 1999 CS_{56}
- Minor planet category: main-belt · (inner); Nysa–Polana complex

Orbital characteristics
- Epoch 23 March 2018 (JD 2458200.5)
- Uncertainty parameter 0
- Observation arc: 28.39 yr (10,369 d)
- Aphelion: 2.9123 AU
- Perihelion: 1.9732 AU
- Semi-major axis: 2.4427 AU
- Eccentricity: 0.1922
- Orbital period (sidereal): 3.82 yr (1,394 d)
- Mean anomaly: 192.32°
- Mean motion: 0° 15^{m} 29.52^{s} / day
- Inclination: 3.4527°
- Longitude of ascending node: 81.303°
- Argument of perihelion: 248.25°

Physical characteristics
- Mean diameter: 4.675±0.152 km 5.04 km (calculated)
- Synodic rotation period: 4.829±0.001 h
- Geometric albedo: 0.21 (assumed); 0.353±0.028
- Spectral type: S (SDSS-MOC)
- Absolute magnitude (H): 13.4; 13.8

31179 Gongju (provisional designation 1997 YR_{2}) is a stony asteroid from the inner regions of the asteroid belt, approximately 5 kilometers (3 miles) in diameter. It was discovered on 21 December 1997, by Japanese amateur astronomer Naoto Sato at his Chichibu Observatory near Tokyo, central Japan. The S-type asteroid has a rotation period of 4.8 hours and possibly an elongated shape. It was named for the South Korean city of Gongju.

== Orbit and classification ==
Gongju is a member of the Nysa–Polana complex, a collection of overlapping asteroid families. It orbits the Sun in the inner asteroid belt at a distance of 2.0–2.9 AU once every 3 years and 10 months (1,394 days; semi-major axis of 2.44 AU). Its orbit has an eccentricity of 0.19 and an inclination of 3° with respect to the ecliptic. The body's observation arc begins with its observations as 1989 TM_{9} at ESO's La Silla Observatory in October 1989, more than 8 years prior to its official discovery observation at Chichibu.

== Physical characteristics ==
Based on the Moving Object Catalog (MOC) of the Sloan Digital Sky Survey, Gongju has a spectral type of a stony S-type asteroid.

=== Rotation period ===
In October 2012, a rotational lightcurve of Gongju was obtained from photometric observations by American astronomer John Ruthroff at the Shadowbox Observatory in Indiana. Lightcurve analysis gave a well-defined rotation period of 4.829 hours with a high brightness amplitude of 0.80 magnitude, indicative of a non-spherical shape (U=3).

=== Diameter and albedo ===
According to the survey carried out by the NEOWISE mission of NASA's Wide-field Infrared Survey Explorer, Gongju measures 4.675 kilometers in diameter and its surface has an albedo of 0.353, while the Collaborative Asteroid Lightcurve Link assumes an albedo of 0.21 and calculates a diameter of 5.04 kilometers based on an absolute magnitude of 13.8.

== Naming ==
This minor planet was named after the South Korean city of Gongju, located in Chungcheongnam Province. It has a population of approximately 120,000 and was the capital of Baekje dynasty in the 5th century AD and the seat of the provincial government until 1932. The official naming citation was published by the Minor Planet Center on 14 May 2014 (M.P.C. 88406).
