= List of minor planets: 33001–34000 =

The following is a partial list of minor planets, running from minor-planet number 33001 through 34000, inclusive. The primary data for this and other partial lists is based on JPL's "Small-Body Orbital Elements" and data available from the Minor Planet Center. Critical list information is also provided by the MPC, unless otherwise specified from Lowell Observatory. A detailed description of the table's columns and additional sources are given on the main page including a complete list of every page in this series, and a statistical break-up on the dynamical classification of minor planets.

Also see the summary list of all named bodies in numerical and alphabetical order, and the corresponding naming citations for the number range of this particular list. New namings may only be added to this list after official publication, as the preannouncement of names is condemned by the Working Group for Small Bodies Nomenclature of the International Astronomical Union.

Near-Earth obj.	MBA (inner)	MBA (outer)	Centaur
Mars-crosser	MBA (middle)	Jupiter trojan	Trans-Neptunian obj.
Unclassified

== 33001–33100 ==
Designation			Discovery			Properties		Ref
Permanent	Provisional	Named after	Date	Site	Discoverer(s)	Category	Diam.	Ref
33001	1997 CU_{29}	—	February 6, 1997	Mauna Kea	D. C. Jewitt, J. X. Luu, C. A. Trujillo, J. Chen	cubewano (cold)	177 km	MPC · JPL
33002 Everest	1997 DM	Everest	February 17, 1997	Colleverde	V. S. Casulli	·	6.7 km	MPC · JPL
33003	1997 EJ	—	March 1, 1997	Oizumi	T. Kobayashi	EOS	9.3 km	MPC · JPL
33004 Dianesipiera	1997 EP	Dianesipiera	March 2, 1997	Prescott	P. G. Comba	·	5.8 km	MPC · JPL
33005	1997 EZ_{3}	—	March 2, 1997	Kitt Peak	Spacewatch	·	7.8 km	MPC · JPL
33006	1997 EJ_{6}	—	March 6, 1997	Kleť	Kleť	·	13 km	MPC · JPL
33007	1997 EX_{10}	—	March 7, 1997	Kitt Peak	Spacewatch	·	7.8 km	MPC · JPL
33008 Tatematsu	1997 EU_{17}	Tatematsu	March 3, 1997	Kitami	K. Endate, K. Watanabe	·	16 km	MPC · JPL
33009	1997 EM_{28}	—	March 7, 1997	Kitt Peak	Spacewatch	THM	3.4 km	MPC · JPL
33010 Enricoprosperi	1997 EO_{30}	Enricoprosperi	March 11, 1997	San Marcello	L. Tesi, G. Cattani	V	2.9 km	MPC · JPL
33011 Kurtiscarsch	1997 EH_{36}	Kurtiscarsch	March 4, 1997	Socorro	LINEAR	EUN	3.9 km	MPC · JPL
33012 Eddieirizarry	1997 EJ_{55}	Eddieirizarry	March 9, 1997	La Silla	E. W. Elst	THM	7.9 km	MPC · JPL
33013	1997 FZ	—	March 28, 1997	Xinglong	SCAP	THM	7.3 km	MPC · JPL
33014 Kalinich	1997 FE_{4}	Kalinich	March 31, 1997	Socorro	LINEAR	THM	8.5 km	MPC · JPL
33015	1997 GF_{7}	—	April 2, 1997	Socorro	LINEAR	·	2.0 km	MPC · JPL
33016	1997 GZ_{31}	—	April 13, 1997	Xinglong	SCAP	·	6.3 km	MPC · JPL
33017 Wroński	1997 GM_{41}	Wroński	April 9, 1997	La Silla	E. W. Elst	VER	17 km	MPC · JPL
33018	1997 HT_{5}	—	April 28, 1997	Socorro	LINEAR	·	9.2 km	MPC · JPL
33019	1997 ME_{3}	—	June 28, 1997	Socorro	LINEAR	·	2.8 km	MPC · JPL
33020	1997 MG_{9}	—	June 30, 1997	Kitt Peak	Spacewatch	·	1.6 km	MPC · JPL
33021	1997 MV_{10}	—	June 28, 1997	Socorro	LINEAR	NYS ·	3.5 km	MPC · JPL
33022	1997 NN	—	July 1, 1997	Kitt Peak	Spacewatch	·	2.7 km	MPC · JPL
33023	1997 PJ_{3}	—	August 3, 1997	Xinglong	SCAP	EUN	3.9 km	MPC · JPL
33024	1997 PD_{5}	—	August 11, 1997	Xinglong	SCAP	·	2.1 km	MPC · JPL
33025	1997 PV_{5}	—	August 3, 1997	Xinglong	SCAP	·	1.7 km	MPC · JPL
33026	1997 PD_{6}	—	August 5, 1997	Reedy Creek	J. Broughton	·	2.5 km	MPC · JPL
33027 Brouillac	1997 QE	Brouillac	August 23, 1997	Castres	Klotz, A.	·	1.6 km	MPC · JPL
33028	1997 QN	—	August 24, 1997	Dynic	A. Sugie	·	2.9 km	MPC · JPL
33029	1997 QV	—	August 25, 1997	Lake Clear	Williams, K. A.	·	2.4 km	MPC · JPL
33030	1997 QB_{2}	—	August 27, 1997	Nachi-Katsuura	Y. Shimizu, T. Urata	·	3.7 km	MPC · JPL
33031 Paolofini	1997 RX	Paolofini	September 1, 1997	San Marcello	A. Boattini, M. Tombelli	NYS	2.8 km	MPC · JPL
33032	1997 RQ_{8}	—	September 12, 1997	Xinglong	SCAP	·	2.4 km	MPC · JPL
33033	1997 RA_{10}	—	September 12, 1997	Xinglong	SCAP	NYS	5.6 km	MPC · JPL
33034 Dianadamrau	1997 RC_{11}	Dianadamrau	September 3, 1997	Caussols	ODAS	·	1.9 km	MPC · JPL
33035 Pareschi	1997 SZ_{9}	Pareschi	September 27, 1997	Sormano	M. Cavagna, A. Testa	V	1.9 km	MPC · JPL
33036	1997 ST_{10}	—	September 26, 1997	Xinglong	SCAP	·	3.7 km	MPC · JPL
33037	1997 SB_{14}	—	September 28, 1997	Kitt Peak	Spacewatch	·	2.3 km	MPC · JPL
33038	1997 SP_{24}	—	September 30, 1997	Kitt Peak	Spacewatch	·	4.1 km	MPC · JPL
33039	1997 SA_{25}	—	September 30, 1997	Kitt Peak	Spacewatch	EUN	3.2 km	MPC · JPL
33040 Pavelmayer	1997 SO_{25}	Pavelmayer	September 28, 1997	Ondřejov	M. Wolf	·	4.0 km	MPC · JPL
33041	1997 TG_{17}	—	October 6, 1997	Nachi-Katsuura	Y. Shimizu, T. Urata	(5)	3.5 km	MPC · JPL
33042	1997 TU_{18}	—	October 6, 1997	Xinglong	SCAP	·	2.3 km	MPC · JPL
33043	1997 TC_{23}	—	October 6, 1997	Kitt Peak	Spacewatch	NYS	2.6 km	MPC · JPL
33044 Erikdavy	1997 UE	Erikdavy	October 20, 1997	Prescott	P. G. Comba	·	2.1 km	MPC · JPL
33045	1997 UF_{1}	—	October 21, 1997	Nachi-Katsuura	Y. Shimizu, T. Urata	·	3.1 km	MPC · JPL
33046	1997 UF_{2}	—	October 21, 1997	Nachi-Katsuura	Y. Shimizu, T. Urata	·	2.4 km	MPC · JPL
33047	1997 UO_{3}	—	October 26, 1997	Oizumi	T. Kobayashi	·	3.6 km	MPC · JPL
33048	1997 UX_{4}	—	October 20, 1997	Xinglong	SCAP	·	3.5 km	MPC · JPL
33049	1997 UF_{5}	—	October 25, 1997	Sormano	P. Sicoli, A. Testa	·	2.0 km	MPC · JPL
33050	1997 UR_{6}	—	October 23, 1997	Kitt Peak	Spacewatch	MAS	1.4 km	MPC · JPL
33051	1997 UF_{7}	—	October 27, 1997	Lime Creek	R. Linderholm	V	2.0 km	MPC · JPL
33052	1997 UA_{8}	—	October 29, 1997	Kleť	Kleť	NYS	2.3 km	MPC · JPL
33053	1997 UB_{12}	—	October 23, 1997	Kitt Peak	Spacewatch	·	1.4 km	MPC · JPL
33054 Eduardorossi	1997 UU_{14}	Eduardorossi	October 26, 1997	San Marcello	M. Tombelli, A. Boattini	·	2.3 km	MPC · JPL
33055	1997 UB_{15}	—	October 26, 1997	Nachi-Katsuura	Y. Shimizu, T. Urata	·	2.7 km	MPC · JPL
33056 Ogunimachi	1997 UG_{15}	Ogunimachi	October 29, 1997	Nanyo	T. Okuni	NYS	6.3 km	MPC · JPL
33057	1997 US_{17}	—	October 25, 1997	Kitt Peak	Spacewatch	·	3.6 km	MPC · JPL
33058 Kovařík	1997 UP_{20}	Kovařík	October 22, 1997	Ondřejov	P. Pravec, L. Kotková	(2076)	2.8 km	MPC · JPL
33059 Matsuoka	1997 VS	Matsuoka	November 1, 1997	Kitami	K. Endate, K. Watanabe	NYS	4.1 km	MPC · JPL
33060	1997 VY	—	November 1, 1997	Oizumi	T. Kobayashi	·	3.3 km	MPC · JPL
33061 Václavmorava	1997 VA_{1}	Václavmorava	November 2, 1997	Kleť	J. Tichá, M. Tichý	NYS	2.6 km	MPC · JPL
33062	1997 VT_{2}	—	November 1, 1997	Xinglong	SCAP	·	2.4 km	MPC · JPL
33063	1997 VB_{3}	—	November 6, 1997	Oizumi	T. Kobayashi	·	3.6 km	MPC · JPL
33064	1997 VS_{3}	—	November 6, 1997	Oizumi	T. Kobayashi	NYS	2.9 km	MPC · JPL
33065	1997 VQ_{5}	—	November 8, 1997	Oizumi	T. Kobayashi	NYS ·	4.4 km	MPC · JPL
33066	1997 VS_{6}	—	November 3, 1997	Stroncone	Santa Lucia	·	2.4 km	MPC · JPL
33067	1997 WJ	—	November 18, 1997	Oizumi	T. Kobayashi	slow	3.4 km	MPC · JPL
33068	1997 WO_{1}	—	November 21, 1997	Xinglong	SCAP	·	2.0 km	MPC · JPL
33069	1997 WQ_{2}	—	November 23, 1997	Oizumi	T. Kobayashi	·	4.1 km	MPC · JPL
33070	1997 WY_{7}	—	November 23, 1997	Chichibu	N. Satō	·	6.0 km	MPC · JPL
33071	1997 WJ_{12}	—	November 22, 1997	Kitt Peak	Spacewatch	·	4.4 km	MPC · JPL
33072	1997 WO_{12}	—	November 23, 1997	Kitt Peak	Spacewatch	·	2.8 km	MPC · JPL
33073	1997 WU_{16}	—	November 28, 1997	Haleakala	NEAT	·	3.5 km	MPC · JPL
33074	1997 WP_{21}	—	November 30, 1997	Oizumi	T. Kobayashi	URS	18 km	MPC · JPL
33075	1997 WV_{22}	—	November 22, 1997	Kitt Peak	Spacewatch	·	4.5 km	MPC · JPL
33076	1997 WM_{24}	—	November 28, 1997	Kitt Peak	Spacewatch	(2076)	3.3 km	MPC · JPL
33077	1997 WG_{25}	—	November 28, 1997	Kitt Peak	Spacewatch	·	3.8 km	MPC · JPL
33078	1997 WN_{35}	—	November 29, 1997	Socorro	LINEAR	·	4.0 km	MPC · JPL
33079	1997 WB_{39}	—	November 29, 1997	Socorro	LINEAR	·	2.3 km	MPC · JPL
33080	1997 WF_{39}	—	November 29, 1997	Socorro	LINEAR	·	4.4 km	MPC · JPL
33081	1997 WR_{41}	—	November 29, 1997	Socorro	LINEAR	NYS	3.6 km	MPC · JPL
33082	1997 WF_{43}	—	November 29, 1997	Socorro	LINEAR	·	3.0 km	MPC · JPL
33083	1997 WN_{47}	—	November 26, 1997	Socorro	LINEAR	NYS	2.8 km	MPC · JPL
33084	1997 WX_{49}	—	November 26, 1997	Socorro	LINEAR	·	3.3 km	MPC · JPL
33085	1997 WN_{56}	—	November 21, 1997	Kitt Peak	Spacewatch	NYS	2.5 km	MPC · JPL
33086	1997 XS	—	December 3, 1997	Oizumi	T. Kobayashi	·	2.4 km	MPC · JPL
33087	1997 XX	—	December 3, 1997	Oizumi	T. Kobayashi	PHO	8.6 km	MPC · JPL
33088	1997 XX_{9}	—	December 3, 1997	Chichibu	N. Satō	V	1.6 km	MPC · JPL
33089	1997 XK_{11}	—	December 15, 1997	Xinglong	SCAP	V	2.8 km	MPC · JPL
33090	1997 XT_{11}	—	December 13, 1997	Xinglong	SCAP	MAR	4.1 km	MPC · JPL
33091	1997 XO_{12}	—	December 4, 1997	Socorro	LINEAR	·	2.5 km	MPC · JPL
33092	1997 YR_{1}	—	December 20, 1997	Xinglong	SCAP	·	7.7 km	MPC · JPL
33093	1997 YF_{3}	—	December 24, 1997	Oizumi	T. Kobayashi	NYS	3.1 km	MPC · JPL
33094	1997 YG_{5}	—	December 23, 1997	Bédoin	P. Antonini	·	2.5 km	MPC · JPL
33095	1997 YM_{5}	—	December 25, 1997	Oizumi	T. Kobayashi	·	3.0 km	MPC · JPL
33096	1997 YS_{6}	—	December 25, 1997	Chichibu	N. Satō	·	2.5 km	MPC · JPL
33097	1997 YB_{7}	—	December 25, 1997	Haleakala	NEAT	·	3.2 km	MPC · JPL
33098	1997 YG_{7}	—	December 25, 1997	Oizumi	T. Kobayashi	EUN	4.0 km	MPC · JPL
33099	1997 YN_{8}	—	December 27, 1997	Woomera	F. B. Zoltowski	·	4.1 km	MPC · JPL
33100 Udine	1997 YK_{9}	Udine	December 28, 1997	Farra d'Isonzo	Farra d'Isonzo	V	2.0 km	MPC · JPL

== 33101–33200 ==
back to top

Designation			Discovery			Properties		Ref
Permanent	Provisional	Named after	Date	Site	Discoverer(s)	Category	Diam.	Ref
33101	1997 YN_{10}	—	December 28, 1997	Oizumi	T. Kobayashi	RAF	3.9 km	MPC · JPL
33102	1997 YJ_{11}	—	December 22, 1997	Xinglong	SCAP	(5)	3.4 km	MPC · JPL
33103 Pintar	1997 YA_{12}	Pintar	December 27, 1997	Goodricke-Pigott	R. A. Tucker	·	3.2 km	MPC · JPL
33104	1997 YJ_{13}	—	December 29, 1997	Kitt Peak	Spacewatch	·	3.7 km	MPC · JPL
33105	1997 YB_{14}	—	December 31, 1997	Oizumi	T. Kobayashi	·	6.3 km	MPC · JPL
33106	1997 YG_{16}	—	December 31, 1997	Oohira	T. Urata	·	5.1 km	MPC · JPL
33107	1997 YL_{16}	—	December 31, 1997	Nachi-Katsuura	Y. Shimizu, T. Urata	·	5.8 km	MPC · JPL
33108	1997 YJ_{18}	—	December 21, 1997	Xinglong	SCAP	slow?	4.9 km	MPC · JPL
33109	1998 AB_{2}	—	January 1, 1998	Kitt Peak	Spacewatch	·	2.7 km	MPC · JPL
33110	1998 AM_{10}	—	January 2, 1998	Reedy Creek	J. Broughton	·	5.1 km	MPC · JPL
33111	1998 BL	—	January 18, 1998	Oizumi	T. Kobayashi	MRX	3.5 km	MPC · JPL
33112	1998 BL_{1}	—	January 19, 1998	Oizumi	T. Kobayashi	·	8.9 km	MPC · JPL
33113 Julabeth	1998 BZ_{3}	Julabeth	January 22, 1998	Prescott	P. G. Comba	·	3.0 km	MPC · JPL
33114	1998 BH_{5}	—	January 18, 1998	Kitt Peak	Spacewatch	·	2.9 km	MPC · JPL
33115	1998 BB_{8}	—	January 25, 1998	Oizumi	T. Kobayashi	MAR	3.1 km	MPC · JPL
33116	1998 BO_{12}	—	January 23, 1998	Socorro	LINEAR	·	4.4 km	MPC · JPL
33117 Ashinimodi	1998 BR_{12}	Ashinimodi	January 23, 1998	Socorro	LINEAR	·	3.5 km	MPC · JPL
33118 Naiknaware	1998 BZ_{12}	Naiknaware	January 23, 1998	Socorro	LINEAR	·	3.3 km	MPC · JPL
33119	1998 BE_{15}	—	January 24, 1998	Haleakala	NEAT	·	6.2 km	MPC · JPL
33120	1998 BQ_{15}	—	January 24, 1998	Haleakala	NEAT	·	6.5 km	MPC · JPL
33121	1998 BR_{15}	—	January 24, 1998	Haleakala	NEAT	·	4.2 km	MPC · JPL
33122	1998 BR_{17}	—	January 22, 1998	Kitt Peak	Spacewatch	·	4.1 km	MPC · JPL
33123	1998 BG_{31}	—	January 26, 1998	Kitt Peak	Spacewatch	slow	5.5 km	MPC · JPL
33124	1998 BN_{33}	—	January 31, 1998	Oizumi	T. Kobayashi	·	6.4 km	MPC · JPL
33125	1998 BU_{33}	—	January 31, 1998	Oizumi	T. Kobayashi	·	3.2 km	MPC · JPL
33126	1998 BB_{34}	—	January 31, 1998	Oizumi	T. Kobayashi	PAD	5.6 km	MPC · JPL
33127	1998 BO_{46}	—	January 26, 1998	Haleakala	NEAT	·	6.3 km	MPC · JPL
33128	1998 BU_{48}	—	January 22, 1998	Steward Observatory	Danzl, N.	centaur	213 km	MPC · JPL
33129 Ivankrasko	1998 CB	Ivankrasko	February 1, 1998	Modra	L. Kornoš, P. Kolény	·	5.8 km	MPC · JPL
33130	1998 CR_{1}	—	February 1, 1998	Bergisch Gladbach	W. Bickel	·	3.3 km	MPC · JPL
33131	1998 CW_{3}	—	February 6, 1998	La Silla	E. W. Elst	(5)	3.9 km	MPC · JPL
33132	1998 CD_{4}	—	February 13, 1998	Xinglong	SCAP	MAR	5.9 km	MPC · JPL
33133	1998 CF_{4}	—	February 6, 1998	La Silla	E. W. Elst	LEO	6.8 km	MPC · JPL
33134	1998 CZ_{4}	—	February 6, 1998	La Silla	E. W. Elst	·	5.3 km	MPC · JPL
33135 Davidrisoldi	1998 DX	Davidrisoldi	February 19, 1998	Stroncone	Santa Lucia	·	5.3 km	MPC · JPL
33136	1998 DZ	—	February 18, 1998	Kleť	Kleť	·	2.7 km	MPC · JPL
33137 Strejček	1998 DO_{1}	Strejček	February 20, 1998	Modra	A. Galád, Pravda, A.	·	2.7 km	MPC · JPL
33138	1998 DQ_{2}	—	February 20, 1998	Caussols	ODAS	·	4.1 km	MPC · JPL
33139	1998 DU_{2}	—	February 16, 1998	Xinglong	SCAP	·	3.1 km	MPC · JPL
33140	1998 DF_{3}	—	February 22, 1998	Haleakala	NEAT	MAR	6.1 km	MPC · JPL
33141	1998 DZ_{4}	—	February 22, 1998	Haleakala	NEAT	(5)	2.1 km	MPC · JPL
33142	1998 DL_{6}	—	February 22, 1998	Haleakala	NEAT	·	6.6 km	MPC · JPL
33143	1998 DJ_{7}	—	February 21, 1998	Kitt Peak	Spacewatch	KOR	3.6 km	MPC · JPL
33144	1998 DM_{7}	—	February 22, 1998	Kitt Peak	Spacewatch	MRX	3.3 km	MPC · JPL
33145	1998 DK_{8}	—	February 21, 1998	Xinglong	SCAP	·	3.4 km	MPC · JPL
33146	1998 DL_{8}	—	February 21, 1998	Xinglong	SCAP	·	4.3 km	MPC · JPL
33147	1998 DD_{9}	—	February 22, 1998	Haleakala	NEAT	·	5.0 km	MPC · JPL
33148	1998 DM_{9}	—	February 22, 1998	Haleakala	NEAT	·	4.8 km	MPC · JPL
33149	1998 DE_{10}	—	February 22, 1998	Haleakala	NEAT	AGN	12 km	MPC · JPL
33150	1998 DN_{10}	—	February 23, 1998	Haleakala	NEAT	EUN	6.0 km	MPC · JPL
33151 Tomasobelloni	1998 DY_{11}	Tomasobelloni	February 25, 1998	Sormano	M. Cavagna, Ghezzi, P.	EUN	3.3 km	MPC · JPL
33152	1998 DV_{12}	—	February 26, 1998	Prescott	P. G. Comba	·	4.3 km	MPC · JPL
33153	1998 DH_{15}	—	February 22, 1998	Haleakala	NEAT	KOR	5.1 km	MPC · JPL
33154 Talent	1998 DT_{15}	Talent	February 22, 1998	Haleakala	NEAT	MAR	4.7 km	MPC · JPL
33155	1998 DD_{17}	—	February 23, 1998	Kitt Peak	Spacewatch	EUN	5.0 km	MPC · JPL
33156	1998 DG_{17}	—	February 23, 1998	Kitt Peak	Spacewatch	·	3.1 km	MPC · JPL
33157 Pertile	1998 DF_{20}	Pertile	February 24, 1998	Ondřejov	P. Pravec	EUN	4.5 km	MPC · JPL
33158 Rúfus	1998 DU_{23}	Rúfus	February 26, 1998	Modra	L. Kornoš, P. Kolény	·	3.1 km	MPC · JPL
33159	1998 DQ_{33}	—	February 27, 1998	La Silla	E. W. Elst	·	3.9 km	MPC · JPL
33160 Denismukwege	1998 DW_{34}	Denismukwege	February 27, 1998	La Silla	E. W. Elst	WAT	8.2 km	MPC · JPL
33161	1998 DE_{35}	—	February 27, 1998	La Silla	E. W. Elst	·	3.6 km	MPC · JPL
33162 Sofiarandich	1998 DT_{35}	Sofiarandich	February 27, 1998	Cima Ekar	G. Forti, M. Tombelli	·	2.6 km	MPC · JPL
33163 Alainaspect	1998 EH	Alainaspect	March 2, 1998	Caussols	ODAS	(5)	2.9 km	MPC · JPL
33164	1998 EB_{2}	—	March 2, 1998	Caussols	ODAS	KOR	5.5 km	MPC · JPL
33165 Joschhambsch	1998 EO_{2}	Joschhambsch	March 2, 1998	Caussols	ODAS	·	11 km	MPC · JPL
33166	1998 EV_{8}	—	March 5, 1998	Xinglong	SCAP	PAL	8.1 km	MPC · JPL
33167	1998 EJ_{9}	—	March 11, 1998	Xinglong	SCAP	HNS	4.4 km	MPC · JPL
33168	1998 ED_{10}	—	March 2, 1998	Xinglong	SCAP	·	8.6 km	MPC · JPL
33169	1998 EU_{10}	—	March 1, 1998	La Silla	E. W. Elst	·	4.2 km	MPC · JPL
33170	1998 EE_{11}	—	March 1, 1998	La Silla	E. W. Elst	·	6.4 km	MPC · JPL
33171	1998 EF_{14}	—	March 1, 1998	La Silla	E. W. Elst	KOR	4.7 km	MPC · JPL
33172	1998 EK_{14}	—	March 1, 1998	La Silla	E. W. Elst	·	6.7 km	MPC · JPL
33173	1998 FC	—	March 16, 1998	Oizumi	T. Kobayashi	GEF	3.7 km	MPC · JPL
33174	1998 FK_{3}	—	March 22, 1998	Oizumi	T. Kobayashi	EUN	3.9 km	MPC · JPL
33175 Isabellegleeson	1998 FP_{5}	Isabellegleeson	March 22, 1998	Modra	A. Galád, Pravda, A.	HYG	6.1 km	MPC · JPL
33176	1998 FN_{12}	—	March 20, 1998	Xinglong	SCAP	KOR	3.5 km	MPC · JPL
33177	1998 FR_{14}	—	March 26, 1998	Caussols	ODAS	AGN	2.6 km	MPC · JPL
33178	1998 FL_{15}	—	March 27, 1998	Woomera	F. B. Zoltowski	·	4.4 km	MPC · JPL
33179 Arsènewenger	1998 FY_{15}	Arsènewenger	March 29, 1998	Cocoa	I. P. Griffin	·	4.3 km	MPC · JPL
33180	1998 FD_{17}	—	March 20, 1998	Socorro	LINEAR	·	3.2 km	MPC · JPL
33181 Aalokpatwa	1998 FN_{17}	Aalokpatwa	March 20, 1998	Socorro	LINEAR	·	7.8 km	MPC · JPL
33182	1998 FT_{26}	—	March 20, 1998	Socorro	LINEAR	·	4.8 km	MPC · JPL
33183	1998 FA_{28}	—	March 20, 1998	Socorro	LINEAR	·	7.1 km	MPC · JPL
33184	1998 FM_{30}	—	March 20, 1998	Socorro	LINEAR	·	3.6 km	MPC · JPL
33185	1998 FB_{31}	—	March 20, 1998	Socorro	LINEAR	EUN	3.7 km	MPC · JPL
33186	1998 FR_{34}	—	March 20, 1998	Socorro	LINEAR	·	6.1 km	MPC · JPL
33187 Pizzolato	1998 FD_{36}	Pizzolato	March 20, 1998	Socorro	LINEAR	·	4.1 km	MPC · JPL
33188 Shreya	1998 FC_{43}	Shreya	March 20, 1998	Socorro	LINEAR	·	5.5 km	MPC · JPL
33189 Ritzdorf	1998 FK_{43}	Ritzdorf	March 20, 1998	Socorro	LINEAR	·	4.7 km	MPC · JPL
33190 Sigrest	1998 FV_{43}	Sigrest	March 20, 1998	Socorro	LINEAR	EOS ·	5.0 km	MPC · JPL
33191 Santiagostone	1998 FW_{43}	Santiagostone	March 20, 1998	Socorro	LINEAR	EOS	3.9 km	MPC · JPL
33192	1998 FD_{44}	—	March 20, 1998	Socorro	LINEAR	KOR	4.2 km	MPC · JPL
33193 Emhyr	1998 FO_{47}	Emhyr	March 20, 1998	Socorro	LINEAR	·	6.0 km	MPC · JPL
33194	1998 FE_{48}	—	March 20, 1998	Socorro	LINEAR	·	14 km	MPC · JPL
33195 Davenyadav	1998 FO_{48}	Davenyadav	March 20, 1998	Socorro	LINEAR	·	5.0 km	MPC · JPL
33196 Kaienyang	1998 FX_{48}	Kaienyang	March 20, 1998	Socorro	LINEAR	HYG	6.4 km	MPC · JPL
33197 Charlallen	1998 FA_{52}	Charlallen	March 20, 1998	Socorro	LINEAR	THM	7.6 km	MPC · JPL
33198 Mackewicz	1998 FV_{52}	Mackewicz	March 20, 1998	Socorro	LINEAR	·	6.0 km	MPC · JPL
33199	1998 FS_{53}	—	March 20, 1998	Socorro	LINEAR	·	5.7 km	MPC · JPL
33200 Carasummit	1998 FY_{53}	Carasummit	March 20, 1998	Socorro	LINEAR	HYG	8.8 km	MPC · JPL

== 33201–33300 ==
back to top

Designation			Discovery			Properties		Ref
Permanent	Provisional	Named after	Date	Site	Discoverer(s)	Category	Diam.	Ref
33201 Thomasartiss	1998 FL_{54}	Thomasartiss	March 20, 1998	Socorro	LINEAR	·	5.3 km	MPC · JPL
33202 Davignon	1998 FY_{54}	Davignon	March 20, 1998	Socorro	LINEAR	·	5.0 km	MPC · JPL
33203	1998 FA_{57}	—	March 20, 1998	Socorro	LINEAR	KOR	4.2 km	MPC · JPL
33204	1998 FP_{57}	—	March 20, 1998	Socorro	LINEAR	(5651)	6.7 km	MPC · JPL
33205 Graigmarx	1998 FH_{58}	Graigmarx	March 20, 1998	Socorro	LINEAR	THM	7.0 km	MPC · JPL
33206	1998 FB_{60}	—	March 20, 1998	Socorro	LINEAR	EUN	3.8 km	MPC · JPL
33207	1998 FU_{64}	—	March 20, 1998	Socorro	LINEAR	·	7.5 km	MPC · JPL
33208	1998 FL_{65}	—	March 20, 1998	Socorro	LINEAR	EOS	5.1 km	MPC · JPL
33209	1998 FD_{67}	—	March 20, 1998	Socorro	LINEAR	·	11 km	MPC · JPL
33210 Johnrobertson	1998 FC_{70}	Johnrobertson	March 20, 1998	Socorro	LINEAR	·	3.2 km	MPC · JPL
33211	1998 FG_{74}	—	March 30, 1998	Woomera	F. B. Zoltowski	·	9.7 km	MPC · JPL
33212	1998 FG_{76}	—	March 24, 1998	Socorro	LINEAR	THM	8.1 km	MPC · JPL
33213 Diggs	1998 FB_{80}	Diggs	March 24, 1998	Socorro	LINEAR	·	4.4 km	MPC · JPL
33214	1998 FP_{90}	—	March 24, 1998	Socorro	LINEAR	HNS	6.3 km	MPC · JPL
33215 Garyjones	1998 FU_{90}	Garyjones	March 24, 1998	Socorro	LINEAR	·	3.8 km	MPC · JPL
33216	1998 FW_{96}	—	March 31, 1998	Socorro	LINEAR	·	5.0 km	MPC · JPL
33217 Bonnybasu	1998 FJ_{97}	Bonnybasu	March 31, 1998	Socorro	LINEAR	·	4.4 km	MPC · JPL
33218	1998 FO_{106}	—	March 31, 1998	Socorro	LINEAR	EOS	7.5 km	MPC · JPL
33219 De Los Santos	1998 FN_{107}	De Los Santos	March 31, 1998	Socorro	LINEAR	DOR	5.4 km	MPC · JPL
33220	1998 FS_{109}	—	March 31, 1998	Socorro	LINEAR	·	4.5 km	MPC · JPL
33221 Raqueljacobson	1998 FS_{111}	Raqueljacobson	March 31, 1998	Socorro	LINEAR	·	3.0 km	MPC · JPL
33222 Gillingham	1998 FG_{112}	Gillingham	March 31, 1998	Socorro	LINEAR	·	7.3 km	MPC · JPL
33223	1998 FT_{113}	—	March 31, 1998	Socorro	LINEAR	ADE	11 km	MPC · JPL
33224 Lesrogers	1998 FG_{114}	Lesrogers	March 31, 1998	Socorro	LINEAR	·	4.7 km	MPC · JPL
33225	1998 FA_{118}	—	March 31, 1998	Socorro	LINEAR	·	6.2 km	MPC · JPL
33226 Melissamacko	1998 FW_{121}	Melissamacko	March 20, 1998	Socorro	LINEAR	·	6.0 km	MPC · JPL
33227	1998 FX_{121}	—	March 20, 1998	Socorro	LINEAR	·	5.5 km	MPC · JPL
33228	1998 FZ_{121}	—	March 20, 1998	Socorro	LINEAR	EOS	8.2 km	MPC · JPL
33229	1998 FC_{124}	—	March 24, 1998	Socorro	LINEAR	MAR	5.4 km	MPC · JPL
33230 Libbyrobertson	1998 FC_{128}	Libbyrobertson	March 25, 1998	Socorro	LINEAR	HOF	5.8 km	MPC · JPL
33231	1998 FH_{146}	—	March 24, 1998	Socorro	LINEAR	·	8.2 km	MPC · JPL
33232	1998 GE_{3}	—	April 2, 1998	Socorro	LINEAR	·	6.8 km	MPC · JPL
33233	1998 GT_{6}	—	April 2, 1998	Socorro	LINEAR	·	4.6 km	MPC · JPL
33234	1998 GL_{7}	—	April 2, 1998	Socorro	LINEAR	PHO	5.7 km	MPC · JPL
33235	1998 GB_{8}	—	April 2, 1998	Socorro	LINEAR	MAR	4.9 km	MPC · JPL
33236	1998 GV_{8}	—	April 2, 1998	Socorro	LINEAR	EUN	5.1 km	MPC · JPL
33237	1998 GY_{8}	—	April 2, 1998	Socorro	LINEAR	·	6.8 km	MPC · JPL
33238	1998 GE_{9}	—	April 2, 1998	Socorro	LINEAR	MAR	5.2 km	MPC · JPL
33239	1998 GO_{9}	—	April 2, 1998	Socorro	LINEAR	·	10 km	MPC · JPL
33240	1998 HC_{3}	—	April 20, 1998	Kleť	Kleť	·	6.3 km	MPC · JPL
33241 Jeanmedas	1998 HX_{5}	Jeanmedas	April 21, 1998	Caussols	ODAS	·	8.1 km	MPC · JPL
33242	1998 HR_{6}	—	April 22, 1998	Caussols	ODAS	fast	7.2 km	MPC · JPL
33243	1998 HY_{7}	—	April 24, 1998	Haleakala	NEAT	·	4.7 km	MPC · JPL
33244	1998 HO_{13}	—	April 18, 1998	Socorro	LINEAR	·	7.9 km	MPC · JPL
33245	1998 HV_{14}	—	April 17, 1998	Kitt Peak	Spacewatch	·	4.6 km	MPC · JPL
33246	1998 HK_{17}	—	April 18, 1998	Socorro	LINEAR	HOF	12 km	MPC · JPL
33247 Iannacone	1998 HO_{18}	Iannacone	April 18, 1998	Socorro	LINEAR	·	5.7 km	MPC · JPL
33248 Nataliehowell	1998 HY_{18}	Nataliehowell	April 18, 1998	Socorro	LINEAR	·	4.0 km	MPC · JPL
33249 Pamelasvenson	1998 HE_{22}	Pamelasvenson	April 20, 1998	Socorro	LINEAR	·	6.1 km	MPC · JPL
33250	1998 HO_{23}	—	April 25, 1998	Haleakala	NEAT	·	11 km	MPC · JPL
33251 Marcvandenbroeck	1998 HS_{24}	Marcvandenbroeck	April 22, 1998	Uccle	T. Pauwels	EOS	5.5 km	MPC · JPL
33252	1998 HA_{28}	—	April 22, 1998	Kitt Peak	Spacewatch	HYG	6.5 km	MPC · JPL
33253	1998 HJ_{29}	—	April 20, 1998	Socorro	LINEAR	·	9.6 km	MPC · JPL
33254 Sundaresakumar	1998 HE_{30}	Sundaresakumar	April 20, 1998	Socorro	LINEAR	HOF	7.3 km	MPC · JPL
33255 Kathybush	1998 HB_{32}	Kathybush	April 20, 1998	Socorro	LINEAR	·	7.6 km	MPC · JPL
33256	1998 HK_{35}	—	April 20, 1998	Socorro	LINEAR	EOS	8.8 km	MPC · JPL
33257	1998 HS_{37}	—	April 20, 1998	Socorro	LINEAR	AGN	5.0 km	MPC · JPL
33258 Femariebustos	1998 HX_{38}	Femariebustos	April 20, 1998	Socorro	LINEAR	·	7.1 km	MPC · JPL
33259	1998 HL_{39}	—	April 20, 1998	Socorro	LINEAR	·	8.6 km	MPC · JPL
33260	1998 HJ_{43}	—	April 24, 1998	Haleakala	NEAT	slow	6.6 km	MPC · JPL
33261 Ginagarlie	1998 HQ_{45}	Ginagarlie	April 20, 1998	Socorro	LINEAR	·	3.2 km	MPC · JPL
33262 Marklewis	1998 HK_{51}	Marklewis	April 25, 1998	Anderson Mesa	LONEOS	·	10 km	MPC · JPL
33263 Willhutch	1998 HP_{53}	Willhutch	April 21, 1998	Socorro	LINEAR	KOR	3.6 km	MPC · JPL
33264 Maryrogers	1998 HM_{56}	Maryrogers	April 21, 1998	Socorro	LINEAR	THM	7.8 km	MPC · JPL
33265	1998 HC_{63}	—	April 21, 1998	Socorro	LINEAR	MAR	5.3 km	MPC · JPL
33266	1998 HW_{78}	—	April 21, 1998	Socorro	LINEAR	EOS	5.5 km	MPC · JPL
33267	1998 HY_{93}	—	April 21, 1998	Socorro	LINEAR	HYG	12 km	MPC · JPL
33268	1998 HZ_{93}	—	April 21, 1998	Socorro	LINEAR	·	3.9 km	MPC · JPL
33269 Broccoli	1998 HC_{95}	Broccoli	April 21, 1998	Socorro	LINEAR	·	2.4 km	MPC · JPL
33270 Katiecrysup	1998 HJ_{99}	Katiecrysup	April 21, 1998	Socorro	LINEAR	·	9.6 km	MPC · JPL
33271	1998 HS_{101}	—	April 28, 1998	Socorro	LINEAR	·	6.3 km	MPC · JPL
33272	1998 HC_{102}	—	April 25, 1998	La Silla	E. W. Elst	EOS	8.1 km	MPC · JPL
33273	1998 HM_{103}	—	April 23, 1998	Socorro	LINEAR	·	7.3 km	MPC · JPL
33274 Beaubingham	1998 HT_{105}	Beaubingham	April 23, 1998	Socorro	LINEAR	·	4.7 km	MPC · JPL
33275	1998 HD_{115}	—	April 23, 1998	Socorro	LINEAR	EUN	5.2 km	MPC · JPL
33276	1998 HS_{115}	—	April 23, 1998	Socorro	LINEAR	EOS	5.5 km	MPC · JPL
33277	1998 HO_{119}	—	April 23, 1998	Socorro	LINEAR	EOS	6.4 km	MPC · JPL
33278	1998 HR_{119}	—	April 23, 1998	Socorro	LINEAR	·	14 km	MPC · JPL
33279	1998 HA_{120}	—	April 23, 1998	Socorro	LINEAR	EOS	9.5 km	MPC · JPL
33280	1998 HT_{120}	—	April 23, 1998	Socorro	LINEAR	EOS	6.7 km	MPC · JPL
33281	1998 HE_{125}	—	April 23, 1998	Socorro	LINEAR	EOS	8.3 km	MPC · JPL
33282 Arjunramani	1998 HZ_{129}	Arjunramani	April 19, 1998	Socorro	LINEAR	·	7.7 km	MPC · JPL
33283	1998 HJ_{148}	—	April 25, 1998	La Silla	E. W. Elst	·	7.3 km	MPC · JPL
33284	1998 HD_{153}	—	April 24, 1998	Socorro	LINEAR	EUN	6.4 km	MPC · JPL
33285 Martínleiva	1998 JR_{2}	Martínleiva	May 1, 1998	Anderson Mesa	LONEOS	EOS	6.6 km	MPC · JPL
33286	1998 KA	—	May 16, 1998	Woomera	F. B. Zoltowski	HYG	8.4 km	MPC · JPL
33287 Lasue	1998 KE_{1}	Lasue	May 18, 1998	Anderson Mesa	LONEOS	EOS	8.0 km	MPC · JPL
33288 Shixian	1998 KL_{4}	Shixian	May 22, 1998	Anderson Mesa	LONEOS	·	10 km	MPC · JPL
33289	1998 KP_{5}	—	May 18, 1998	Kitt Peak	Spacewatch	·	14 km	MPC · JPL
33290 Carloszuluaga	1998 KZ_{7}	Carloszuluaga	May 23, 1998	Anderson Mesa	LONEOS	·	15 km	MPC · JPL
33291	1998 KP_{9}	—	May 20, 1998	Xinglong	SCAP	·	2.9 km	MPC · JPL
33292	1998 KT_{26}	—	May 27, 1998	Kitt Peak	Spacewatch	LUT	18 km	MPC · JPL
33293	1998 KM_{31}	—	May 22, 1998	Socorro	LINEAR	EOS	5.9 km	MPC · JPL
33294	1998 KM_{35}	—	May 22, 1998	Socorro	LINEAR	·	5.7 km	MPC · JPL
33295	1998 KV_{40}	—	May 22, 1998	Socorro	LINEAR	EOS · slow	6.9 km	MPC · JPL
33296 Jennylarson	1998 KN_{42}	Jennylarson	May 27, 1998	Anderson Mesa	LONEOS	·	9.4 km	MPC · JPL
33297	1998 KW_{44}	—	May 22, 1998	Socorro	LINEAR	·	12 km	MPC · JPL
33298	1998 KY_{44}	—	May 22, 1998	Socorro	LINEAR	EOS	6.8 km	MPC · JPL
33299	1998 KN_{45}	—	May 22, 1998	Socorro	LINEAR	THM	8.4 km	MPC · JPL
33300	1998 KP_{45}	—	May 22, 1998	Socorro	LINEAR	·	10 km	MPC · JPL

== 33301–33400 ==
back to top

Designation			Discovery			Properties		Ref
Permanent	Provisional	Named after	Date	Site	Discoverer(s)	Category	Diam.	Ref
33301	1998 KH_{47}	—	May 22, 1998	Socorro	LINEAR	·	13 km	MPC · JPL
33302	1998 KV_{48}	—	May 23, 1998	Socorro	LINEAR	·	8.9 km	MPC · JPL
33303	1998 KW_{48}	—	May 23, 1998	Socorro	LINEAR	ADE	8.8 km	MPC · JPL
33304	1998 KH_{50}	—	May 23, 1998	Socorro	LINEAR	(21885)	11 km	MPC · JPL
33305	1998 KQ_{50}	—	May 23, 1998	Socorro	LINEAR	·	10 km	MPC · JPL
33306	1998 KT_{50}	—	May 23, 1998	Socorro	LINEAR	·	11 km	MPC · JPL
33307	1998 KX_{52}	—	May 23, 1998	Socorro	LINEAR	·	11 km	MPC · JPL
33308	1998 KR_{53}	—	May 23, 1998	Socorro	LINEAR	·	10 km	MPC · JPL
33309	1998 KY_{53}	—	May 23, 1998	Socorro	LINEAR	EOS	7.5 km	MPC · JPL
33310	1998 KF_{54}	—	May 23, 1998	Socorro	LINEAR	CYB	14 km	MPC · JPL
33311	1998 KX_{54}	—	May 23, 1998	Socorro	LINEAR	·	10 km	MPC · JPL
33312	1998 KG_{57}	—	May 22, 1998	Socorro	LINEAR	·	11 km	MPC · JPL
33313	1998 KJ_{60}	—	May 23, 1998	Socorro	LINEAR	WAT · slow	5.3 km	MPC · JPL
33314	1998 KX_{60}	—	May 23, 1998	Socorro	LINEAR	EOS	7.0 km	MPC · JPL
33315	1998 KA_{63}	—	May 22, 1998	Socorro	LINEAR	HYG	8.4 km	MPC · JPL
33316	1998 KY_{65}	—	May 27, 1998	Socorro	LINEAR	T_{j} (2.97)	12 km	MPC · JPL
33317	1998 MT_{5}	—	June 19, 1998	Socorro	LINEAR	PHO	4.2 km	MPC · JPL
33318	1998 MU_{9}	—	June 19, 1998	Socorro	LINEAR	·	1.9 km	MPC · JPL
33319 Kunqu	1998 MJ_{41}	Kunqu	June 28, 1998	La Silla	E. W. Elst	H · slow	2.2 km	MPC · JPL
33320	1998 OP_{12}	—	July 26, 1998	La Silla	E. W. Elst	·	5.5 km	MPC · JPL
33321	1998 QL	—	August 17, 1998	Woomera	F. B. Zoltowski	AGN	3.4 km	MPC · JPL
33322	1998 QQ_{5}	—	August 19, 1998	Socorro	LINEAR	H	1.4 km	MPC · JPL
33323 Lucaspaganini	1998 QN_{53}	Lucaspaganini	August 23, 1998	Anderson Mesa	LONEOS	·	16 km	MPC · JPL
33324	1998 QE_{56}	—	August 28, 1998	Socorro	LINEAR	H	2.0 km	MPC · JPL
33325	1998 RH_{3}	—	September 14, 1998	Socorro	LINEAR	H	1.6 km	MPC · JPL
33326	1998 RJ_{4}	—	September 14, 1998	Socorro	LINEAR	H	1.2 km	MPC · JPL
33327	1998 RV_{4}	—	September 14, 1998	Socorro	LINEAR	H · slow	1.2 km	MPC · JPL
33328 Archanaverma	1998 RV_{41}	Archanaverma	September 14, 1998	Socorro	LINEAR	·	6.9 km	MPC · JPL
33329 Stefanwan	1998 RY_{77}	Stefanwan	September 14, 1998	Socorro	LINEAR	·	3.5 km	MPC · JPL
33330 Barèges	1998 SW	Barèges	September 16, 1998	Caussols	ODAS	·	1.9 km	MPC · JPL
33331	1998 SY_{21}	—	September 23, 1998	Višnjan Observatory	Višnjan	·	3.0 km	MPC · JPL
33332	1998 SN_{34}	—	September 26, 1998	Socorro	LINEAR	H	1.3 km	MPC · JPL
33333	1998 SP_{66}	—	September 20, 1998	La Silla	E. W. Elst	·	2.6 km	MPC · JPL
33334 Turon	1998 VM_{4}	Turon	November 11, 1998	Caussols	ODAS	·	6.1 km	MPC · JPL
33335 Guibert	1998 VQ_{4}	Guibert	November 11, 1998	Caussols	ODAS	·	1.9 km	MPC · JPL
33336	1998 VF_{7}	—	November 10, 1998	Socorro	LINEAR	·	8.0 km	MPC · JPL
33337 Amberyang	1998 VA_{11}	Amberyang	November 10, 1998	Socorro	LINEAR	·	2.4 km	MPC · JPL
33338	1998 VF_{21}	—	November 10, 1998	Socorro	LINEAR	·	5.8 km	MPC · JPL
33339	1998 VR_{32}	—	November 15, 1998	Catalina	CSS	H	1.7 km	MPC · JPL
33340	1998 VG_{44}	—	November 14, 1998	Steward Observatory	J. A. Larsen, Danzl, N., Gleason, A.	plutino	248 km	MPC · JPL
33341	1998 WA_{5}	—	November 19, 1998	Catalina	CSS	H · slow	2.5 km	MPC · JPL
33342	1998 WT_{24}	—	November 25, 1998	Socorro	LINEAR	ATE +1km · PHA	430 m	MPC · JPL
33343 Madorobin	1998 XT_{10}	Madorobin	December 15, 1998	Caussols	ODAS	·	1.6 km	MPC · JPL
33344 Madymesple	1998 XN_{13}	Madymesple	December 15, 1998	Caussols	ODAS	·	6.8 km	MPC · JPL
33345 Nataliedessay	1998 XC_{14}	Nataliedessay	December 15, 1998	Caussols	ODAS	·	5.2 km	MPC · JPL
33346 Sabinedevieilhe	1998 XD_{14}	Sabinedevieilhe	December 15, 1998	Caussols	ODAS	EUN	3.1 km	MPC · JPL
33347 Maryzhu	1998 XJ_{35}	Maryzhu	December 14, 1998	Socorro	LINEAR	NYS	3.1 km	MPC · JPL
33348 Stevelliott	1998 XO_{39}	Stevelliott	December 14, 1998	Socorro	LINEAR	·	3.3 km	MPC · JPL
33349	1998 XF_{72}	—	December 14, 1998	Socorro	LINEAR	·	3.8 km	MPC · JPL
33350	1998 XY_{86}	—	December 15, 1998	Socorro	LINEAR	·	5.7 km	MPC · JPL
33351	1998 XZ_{89}	—	December 15, 1998	Socorro	LINEAR	PHO	5.3 km	MPC · JPL
33352	1998 XF_{95}	—	December 15, 1998	Socorro	LINEAR	·	3.9 km	MPC · JPL
33353 Chattopadhyay	1998 XU_{95}	Chattopadhyay	December 15, 1998	Socorro	LINEAR	·	1.9 km	MPC · JPL
33354	1998 YZ_{16}	—	December 22, 1998	Kitt Peak	Spacewatch	MAS	2.2 km	MPC · JPL
33355	1998 YJ_{19}	—	December 25, 1998	Kitt Peak	Spacewatch	·	1.5 km	MPC · JPL
33356	1999 AM_{3}	—	January 9, 1999	Gekko	T. Kagawa	H	3.1 km	MPC · JPL
33357	1999 AX_{5}	—	January 12, 1999	Oizumi	T. Kobayashi	·	1.8 km	MPC · JPL
33358	1999 AD_{8}	—	January 13, 1999	Oizumi	T. Kobayashi	·	2.1 km	MPC · JPL
33359	1999 AD_{19}	—	January 13, 1999	Kitt Peak	Spacewatch	·	6.2 km	MPC · JPL
33360	1999 AK_{25}	—	January 15, 1999	Monte Agliale	S. Donati	·	4.4 km	MPC · JPL
33361	1999 AU_{25}	—	January 15, 1999	Caussols	ODAS	·	1.6 km	MPC · JPL
33362	1999 BP_{1}	—	January 16, 1999	Višnjan Observatory	K. Korlević	·	5.0 km	MPC · JPL
33363	1999 BO_{4}	—	January 19, 1999	Caussols	ODAS	·	5.4 km	MPC · JPL
33364	1999 BX_{5}	—	January 20, 1999	Višnjan Observatory	K. Korlević	·	1.9 km	MPC · JPL
33365	1999 BQ_{6}	—	January 20, 1999	Caussols	ODAS	·	2.8 km	MPC · JPL
33366	1999 BF_{7}	—	January 21, 1999	Oizumi	T. Kobayashi	·	2.8 km	MPC · JPL
33367	1999 BD_{8}	—	January 22, 1999	Višnjan Observatory	K. Korlević	·	1.7 km	MPC · JPL
33368	1999 BD_{9}	—	January 22, 1999	Višnjan Observatory	K. Korlević	·	3.3 km	MPC · JPL
33369	1999 BE_{11}	—	January 20, 1999	Caussols	ODAS	V	2.0 km	MPC · JPL
33370	1999 BQ_{11}	—	January 20, 1999	Caussols	ODAS	·	3.7 km	MPC · JPL
33371	1999 BS_{11}	—	January 21, 1999	Caussols	ODAS	·	2.2 km	MPC · JPL
33372 Jonathanchung	1999 BP_{23}	Jonathanchung	January 18, 1999	Socorro	LINEAR	NYS	3.1 km	MPC · JPL
33373	1999 BL_{28}	—	January 17, 1999	Kitt Peak	Spacewatch	·	2.1 km	MPC · JPL
33374	1999 CE_{2}	—	February 6, 1999	Višnjan Observatory	K. Korlević	NYS	2.6 km	MPC · JPL
33375	1999 CD_{4}	—	February 9, 1999	Xinglong	SCAP	·	2.9 km	MPC · JPL
33376 Medi	1999 CZ_{8}	Medi	February 6, 1999	Pianoro	V. Goretti	·	4.8 km	MPC · JPL
33377 Večerníček	1999 CR_{9}	Večerníček	February 12, 1999	Ondřejov	P. Pravec	·	1.5 km	MPC · JPL
33378	1999 CE_{14}	—	February 13, 1999	Gekko	T. Kagawa	·	2.3 km	MPC · JPL
33379 Rohandalvi	1999 CX_{23}	Rohandalvi	February 10, 1999	Socorro	LINEAR	·	2.4 km	MPC · JPL
33380	1999 CC_{33}	—	February 10, 1999	Socorro	LINEAR	·	2.2 km	MPC · JPL
33381	1999 CD_{33}	—	February 10, 1999	Socorro	LINEAR	·	2.8 km	MPC · JPL
33382 Indranidas	1999 CE_{33}	Indranidas	February 10, 1999	Socorro	LINEAR	·	5.8 km	MPC · JPL
33383 Edupuganti	1999 CV_{36}	Edupuganti	February 10, 1999	Socorro	LINEAR	·	2.3 km	MPC · JPL
33384 Jacyfang	1999 CV_{42}	Jacyfang	February 10, 1999	Socorro	LINEAR	·	3.1 km	MPC · JPL
33385	1999 CY_{46}	—	February 10, 1999	Socorro	LINEAR	V	3.7 km	MPC · JPL
33386	1999 CJ_{48}	—	February 10, 1999	Socorro	LINEAR	·	2.3 km	MPC · JPL
33387	1999 CA_{49}	—	February 10, 1999	Socorro	LINEAR	·	2.9 km	MPC · JPL
33388	1999 CH_{50}	—	February 10, 1999	Socorro	LINEAR	·	4.1 km	MPC · JPL
33389 Isairisgreco	1999 CZ_{50}	Isairisgreco	February 10, 1999	Socorro	LINEAR	(883)	3.8 km	MPC · JPL
33390 Hajlasz	1999 CJ_{51}	Hajlasz	February 10, 1999	Socorro	LINEAR	(6769)	6.3 km	MPC · JPL
33391	1999 CN_{51}	—	February 10, 1999	Socorro	LINEAR	·	2.6 km	MPC · JPL
33392 Blakehord	1999 CH_{54}	Blakehord	February 10, 1999	Socorro	LINEAR	·	2.0 km	MPC · JPL
33393 Khandelwal	1999 CL_{54}	Khandelwal	February 10, 1999	Socorro	LINEAR	·	4.9 km	MPC · JPL
33394 Nathaniellee	1999 CR_{54}	Nathaniellee	February 10, 1999	Socorro	LINEAR	NYS	3.1 km	MPC · JPL
33395 Dylanli	1999 CU_{54}	Dylanli	February 10, 1999	Socorro	LINEAR	NYS	1.6 km	MPC · JPL
33396 Vrindamadan	1999 CU_{56}	Vrindamadan	February 10, 1999	Socorro	LINEAR	·	2.2 km	MPC · JPL
33397 Prathiknaidu	1999 CG_{57}	Prathiknaidu	February 10, 1999	Socorro	LINEAR	·	2.4 km	MPC · JPL
33398	1999 CQ_{58}	—	February 10, 1999	Socorro	LINEAR	·	4.5 km	MPC · JPL
33399 Emilyann	1999 CC_{59}	Emilyann	February 10, 1999	Socorro	LINEAR	·	1.9 km	MPC · JPL
33400 Laurapierson	1999 CJ_{59}	Laurapierson	February 10, 1999	Socorro	LINEAR	·	3.9 km	MPC · JPL

== 33401–33500 ==
back to top

Designation			Discovery			Properties		Ref
Permanent	Provisional	Named after	Date	Site	Discoverer(s)	Category	Diam.	Ref
33401 Radiya-Dixit	1999 CC_{68}	Radiya-Dixit	February 12, 1999	Socorro	LINEAR	·	2.6 km	MPC · JPL
33402 Canizares	1999 CC_{71}	Canizares	February 12, 1999	Socorro	LINEAR	·	4.2 km	MPC · JPL
33403	1999 CN_{73}	—	February 12, 1999	Socorro	LINEAR	·	1.8 km	MPC · JPL
33404	1999 CT_{73}	—	February 12, 1999	Socorro	LINEAR	·	9.5 km	MPC · JPL
33405 Rekhtman	1999 CW_{73}	Rekhtman	February 12, 1999	Socorro	LINEAR	·	1.8 km	MPC · JPL
33406 Saltzman	1999 CM_{74}	Saltzman	February 12, 1999	Socorro	LINEAR	·	5.4 km	MPC · JPL
33407	1999 CA_{75}	—	February 12, 1999	Socorro	LINEAR	·	5.5 km	MPC · JPL
33408 Mananshah	1999 CW_{76}	Mananshah	February 12, 1999	Socorro	LINEAR	·	2.2 km	MPC · JPL
33409	1999 CD_{77}	—	February 12, 1999	Socorro	LINEAR	·	2.8 km	MPC · JPL
33410	1999 CX_{85}	—	February 10, 1999	Socorro	LINEAR	·	2.5 km	MPC · JPL
33411	1999 CV_{91}	—	February 10, 1999	Socorro	LINEAR	NYS	1.8 km	MPC · JPL
33412 Arjunsubra	1999 CX_{96}	Arjunsubra	February 10, 1999	Socorro	LINEAR	·	6.5 km	MPC · JPL
33413 Alecsun	1999 CP_{99}	Alecsun	February 10, 1999	Socorro	LINEAR	·	1.7 km	MPC · JPL
33414 Jessicatian	1999 CP_{100}	Jessicatian	February 10, 1999	Socorro	LINEAR	·	2.2 km	MPC · JPL
33415 Felixwang	1999 CB_{101}	Felixwang	February 10, 1999	Socorro	LINEAR	·	2.2 km	MPC · JPL
33416	1999 CW_{101}	—	February 10, 1999	Socorro	LINEAR	·	3.1 km	MPC · JPL
33417	1999 CV_{103}	—	February 12, 1999	Socorro	LINEAR	·	3.6 km	MPC · JPL
33418 Jacksonweaver	1999 CJ_{106}	Jacksonweaver	February 12, 1999	Socorro	LINEAR	·	2.3 km	MPC · JPL
33419 Wellman	1999 CD_{112}	Wellman	February 12, 1999	Socorro	LINEAR	·	3.5 km	MPC · JPL
33420 Derekwoo	1999 CT_{116}	Derekwoo	February 12, 1999	Socorro	LINEAR	·	3.9 km	MPC · JPL
33421 Byronxu	1999 CN_{118}	Byronxu	February 13, 1999	Socorro	LINEAR	·	2.6 km	MPC · JPL
33422	1999 CN_{135}	—	February 8, 1999	Kitt Peak	Spacewatch	KOR	3.3 km	MPC · JPL
33423	1999 DK	—	February 16, 1999	Caussols	ODAS	·	2.6 km	MPC · JPL
33424	1999 DC_{2}	—	February 16, 1999	Socorro	LINEAR	PHO	3.5 km	MPC · JPL
33425	1999 DP_{2}	—	February 19, 1999	Oizumi	T. Kobayashi	·	2.4 km	MPC · JPL
33426	1999 DR_{2}	—	February 19, 1999	Oizumi	T. Kobayashi	V	2.1 km	MPC · JPL
33427	1999 DZ_{2}	—	February 21, 1999	Oizumi	T. Kobayashi	·	2.7 km	MPC · JPL
33428	1999 DO_{3}	—	February 18, 1999	Višnjan Observatory	K. Korlević, M. Jurić	·	2.2 km	MPC · JPL
33429	1999 DL_{4}	—	February 23, 1999	Višnjan Observatory	K. Korlević, M. Jurić	·	6.7 km	MPC · JPL
33430	1999 EH	—	March 7, 1999	Reedy Creek	J. Broughton	·	2.4 km	MPC · JPL
33431	1999 EK	—	March 9, 1999	Zeno	T. Stafford	·	3.3 km	MPC · JPL
33432	1999 ET_{3}	—	March 15, 1999	Prescott	P. G. Comba	EOS	6.0 km	MPC · JPL
33433 Maurilia	1999 EZ_{4}	Maurilia	March 14, 1999	Gnosca	S. Sposetti	·	3.3 km	MPC · JPL
33434 Scottmanley	1999 FU	Scottmanley	March 17, 1999	Caussols	ODAS	KOR	4.6 km	MPC · JPL
33435	1999 FD_{4}	—	March 16, 1999	Kitt Peak	Spacewatch	MIS	7.4 km	MPC · JPL
33436	1999 FZ_{6}	—	March 20, 1999	Caussols	ODAS	GEF	4.3 km	MPC · JPL
33437 Ordenovic	1999 FK_{9}	Ordenovic	March 22, 1999	Anderson Mesa	LONEOS	NYS	2.1 km	MPC · JPL
33438 Mauriziopajola	1999 FE_{10}	Mauriziopajola	March 22, 1999	Anderson Mesa	LONEOS	·	2.4 km	MPC · JPL
33439	1999 FF_{18}	—	March 20, 1999	Anderson Mesa	LONEOS	·	3.9 km	MPC · JPL
33440 Nicholasprato	1999 FR_{18}	Nicholasprato	March 22, 1999	Anderson Mesa	LONEOS	V	2.2 km	MPC · JPL
33441 Catherineprato	1999 FT_{18}	Catherineprato	March 22, 1999	Anderson Mesa	LONEOS	V	2.5 km	MPC · JPL
33442 Cassandrarunyon	1999 FW_{18}	Cassandrarunyon	March 22, 1999	Anderson Mesa	LONEOS	·	3.7 km	MPC · JPL
33443 Schambeau	1999 FZ_{18}	Schambeau	March 22, 1999	Anderson Mesa	LONEOS	·	5.8 km	MPC · JPL
33444 Shaddad	1999 FF_{19}	Shaddad	March 22, 1999	Anderson Mesa	LONEOS	·	2.3 km	MPC · JPL
33445	1999 FB_{21}	—	March 23, 1999	Gnosca	S. Sposetti	KOR	4.3 km	MPC · JPL
33446 Michaelyang	1999 FU_{23}	Michaelyang	March 19, 1999	Socorro	LINEAR	·	1.7 km	MPC · JPL
33447	1999 FM_{24}	—	March 19, 1999	Socorro	LINEAR	·	3.7 km	MPC · JPL
33448 Aaronyeiser	1999 FT_{24}	Aaronyeiser	March 19, 1999	Socorro	LINEAR	·	3.1 km	MPC · JPL
33449	1999 FL_{25}	—	March 19, 1999	Socorro	LINEAR	·	3.3 km	MPC · JPL
33450 Allender	1999 FO_{25}	Allender	March 19, 1999	Socorro	LINEAR	·	3.2 km	MPC · JPL
33451 Michaelarney	1999 FL_{26}	Michaelarney	March 19, 1999	Socorro	LINEAR	NYS ·	6.2 km	MPC · JPL
33452 Olivebryan	1999 FU_{26}	Olivebryan	March 19, 1999	Socorro	LINEAR	·	5.6 km	MPC · JPL
33453 Townley	1999 FG_{27}	Townley	March 19, 1999	Socorro	LINEAR	·	2.4 km	MPC · JPL
33454 Neilclaffey	1999 FJ_{27}	Neilclaffey	March 19, 1999	Socorro	LINEAR	·	3.0 km	MPC · JPL
33455 Coakley	1999 FV_{27}	Coakley	March 19, 1999	Socorro	LINEAR	V	1.9 km	MPC · JPL
33456 Ericacurran	1999 FG_{28}	Ericacurran	March 19, 1999	Socorro	LINEAR	(2076)	3.3 km	MPC · JPL
33457 Cutillo	1999 FP_{28}	Cutillo	March 19, 1999	Socorro	LINEAR	·	3.0 km	MPC · JPL
33458 Fialkow	1999 FE_{29}	Fialkow	March 19, 1999	Socorro	LINEAR	·	2.8 km	MPC · JPL
33459	1999 FM_{30}	—	March 19, 1999	Socorro	LINEAR	MAS	2.0 km	MPC · JPL
33460	1999 FL_{31}	—	March 19, 1999	Socorro	LINEAR	NYS	3.3 km	MPC · JPL
33461	1999 FP_{31}	—	March 19, 1999	Socorro	LINEAR	·	2.1 km	MPC · JPL
33462 Tophergee	1999 FT_{31}	Tophergee	March 19, 1999	Socorro	LINEAR	·	3.5 km	MPC · JPL
33463 Bettinagregg	1999 FM_{32}	Bettinagregg	March 19, 1999	Socorro	LINEAR	V	2.9 km	MPC · JPL
33464 Melahudock	1999 FN_{32}	Melahudock	March 19, 1999	Socorro	LINEAR	·	2.9 km	MPC · JPL
33465	1999 FP_{32}	—	March 23, 1999	Višnjan Observatory	K. Korlević	·	2.8 km	MPC · JPL
33466 Thomaslarson	1999 FE_{33}	Thomaslarson	March 19, 1999	Socorro	LINEAR	V	1.7 km	MPC · JPL
33467 Johnlieb	1999 FG_{35}	Johnlieb	March 19, 1999	Socorro	LINEAR	·	3.4 km	MPC · JPL
33468 Nelsoneric	1999 FD_{36}	Nelsoneric	March 20, 1999	Socorro	LINEAR	·	3.4 km	MPC · JPL
33469	1999 FL_{36}	—	March 20, 1999	Socorro	LINEAR	EOS	4.0 km	MPC · JPL
33470	1999 FQ_{37}	—	March 20, 1999	Socorro	LINEAR	HOF	10 km	MPC · JPL
33471 Ozuna	1999 FV_{38}	Ozuna	March 20, 1999	Socorro	LINEAR	·	2.9 km	MPC · JPL
33472 Yunorperalta	1999 FN_{42}	Yunorperalta	March 20, 1999	Socorro	LINEAR	·	4.6 km	MPC · JPL
33473 Porterfield	1999 FZ_{45}	Porterfield	March 20, 1999	Socorro	LINEAR	V	1.9 km	MPC · JPL
33474	1999 FB_{51}	—	March 20, 1999	Socorro	LINEAR	·	3.1 km	MPC · JPL
33475	1999 FK_{53}	—	March 28, 1999	Višnjan Observatory	K. Korlević	·	4.5 km	MPC · JPL
33476 Gilanareiss	1999 FV_{54}	Gilanareiss	March 20, 1999	Socorro	LINEAR	V	3.4 km	MPC · JPL
33477	1999 FR_{59}	—	March 27, 1999	Xinglong	SCAP	V	2.0 km	MPC · JPL
33478 Deniselivon	1999 GB	Deniselivon	April 2, 1999	Wykrota	C. Jacques	·	2.1 km	MPC · JPL
33479	1999 GO	—	April 5, 1999	Višnjan Observatory	K. Korlević	THM	11 km	MPC · JPL
33480 Bartolucci	1999 GA_{1}	Bartolucci	April 4, 1999	San Marcello	L. Tesi, M. Tombelli	slow	3.9 km	MPC · JPL
33481	1999 GH_{1}	—	April 7, 1999	Oizumi	T. Kobayashi	·	2.2 km	MPC · JPL
33482	1999 GO_{4}	—	April 10, 1999	Višnjan Observatory	K. Korlević	·	3.2 km	MPC · JPL
33483	1999 GW_{4}	—	April 11, 1999	Fountain Hills	C. W. Juels	·	3.1 km	MPC · JPL
33484 Nathanroth	1999 GS_{7}	Nathanroth	April 7, 1999	Anderson Mesa	LONEOS	·	4.9 km	MPC · JPL
33485	1999 GE_{8}	—	April 9, 1999	Anderson Mesa	LONEOS	V	2.3 km	MPC · JPL
33486 Edreynolds	1999 GN_{8}	Edreynolds	April 10, 1999	Anderson Mesa	LONEOS	·	3.5 km	MPC · JPL
33487 Jeanpierrerivet	1999 GS_{8}	Jeanpierrerivet	April 10, 1999	Anderson Mesa	LONEOS	·	2.6 km	MPC · JPL
33488 Darrelrobertson	1999 GD_{9}	Darrelrobertson	April 10, 1999	Anderson Mesa	LONEOS	·	7.8 km	MPC · JPL
33489 Myungjinkim	1999 GF_{9}	Myungjinkim	April 10, 1999	Anderson Mesa	LONEOS	MAR	6.0 km	MPC · JPL
33490 Roggemans	1999 GK_{9}	Roggemans	April 11, 1999	Anderson Mesa	LONEOS	·	5.2 km	MPC · JPL
33491 Tonyroman	1999 GM_{9}	Tonyroman	April 11, 1999	Anderson Mesa	LONEOS	V	3.1 km	MPC · JPL
33492 Christirogers	1999 GT_{17}	Christirogers	April 15, 1999	Socorro	LINEAR	·	2.8 km	MPC · JPL
33493	1999 GX_{17}	—	April 15, 1999	Socorro	LINEAR	·	9.2 km	MPC · JPL
33494	1999 GZ_{17}	—	April 15, 1999	Socorro	LINEAR	·	3.7 km	MPC · JPL
33495 Schaferjames	1999 GL_{18}	Schaferjames	April 15, 1999	Socorro	LINEAR	·	2.9 km	MPC · JPL
33496	1999 GQ_{18}	—	April 15, 1999	Socorro	LINEAR	·	3.1 km	MPC · JPL
33497	1999 GD_{19}	—	April 15, 1999	Socorro	LINEAR	slow	7.6 km	MPC · JPL
33498 Juliesmith	1999 GG_{19}	Juliesmith	April 15, 1999	Socorro	LINEAR	·	4.6 km	MPC · JPL
33499 Stanton	1999 GN_{19}	Stanton	April 15, 1999	Socorro	LINEAR	·	2.2 km	MPC · JPL
33500	1999 GV_{19}	—	April 15, 1999	Socorro	LINEAR	EUN	4.6 km	MPC · JPL

== 33501–33600 ==
back to top

Designation			Discovery			Properties		Ref
Permanent	Provisional	Named after	Date	Site	Discoverer(s)	Category	Diam.	Ref
33501 Juliethompson	1999 GJ_{20}	Juliethompson	April 15, 1999	Socorro	LINEAR	·	4.0 km	MPC · JPL
33502 Janetwaldeck	1999 GM_{20}	Janetwaldeck	April 15, 1999	Socorro	LINEAR	NYS	2.4 km	MPC · JPL
33503 Dasilvaborges	1999 GS_{20}	Dasilvaborges	April 15, 1999	Socorro	LINEAR	·	6.6 km	MPC · JPL
33504 Rebrouwer	1999 GT_{20}	Rebrouwer	April 15, 1999	Socorro	LINEAR	NYS	1.6 km	MPC · JPL
33505	1999 GZ_{21}	—	April 7, 1999	Socorro	LINEAR	·	2.7 km	MPC · JPL
33506	1999 GM_{23}	—	April 6, 1999	Socorro	LINEAR	·	1.9 km	MPC · JPL
33507	1999 GT_{23}	—	April 6, 1999	Socorro	LINEAR	·	3.9 km	MPC · JPL
33508 Drewnik	1999 GH_{25}	Drewnik	April 6, 1999	Socorro	LINEAR	(5)	3.9 km	MPC · JPL
33509 Mogilny	1999 GB_{27}	Mogilny	April 7, 1999	Socorro	LINEAR	·	1.8 km	MPC · JPL
33510	1999 GM_{31}	—	April 7, 1999	Socorro	LINEAR	·	1.7 km	MPC · JPL
33511 Austinwang	1999 GW_{32}	Austinwang	April 12, 1999	Socorro	LINEAR	V	2.8 km	MPC · JPL
33512	1999 GM_{33}	—	April 12, 1999	Socorro	LINEAR	V	3.2 km	MPC · JPL
33513	1999 GE_{34}	—	April 6, 1999	Socorro	LINEAR	·	4.0 km	MPC · JPL
33514 Changpeihsuan	1999 GF_{34}	Changpeihsuan	April 6, 1999	Socorro	LINEAR	V	3.6 km	MPC · JPL
33515 Linbohan	1999 GM_{34}	Linbohan	April 6, 1999	Socorro	LINEAR	·	4.1 km	MPC · JPL
33516 Timonen	1999 GO_{34}	Timonen	April 6, 1999	Socorro	LINEAR	·	2.6 km	MPC · JPL
33517 Paulfoltin	1999 GT_{34}	Paulfoltin	April 6, 1999	Socorro	LINEAR	DOR	7.1 km	MPC · JPL
33518 Stoetzer	1999 GH_{35}	Stoetzer	April 6, 1999	Socorro	LINEAR	·	2.7 km	MPC · JPL
33519	1999 GL_{36}	—	April 12, 1999	Socorro	LINEAR	GEF	4.7 km	MPC · JPL
33520 Ichige	1999 GE_{38}	Ichige	April 12, 1999	Socorro	LINEAR	·	3.0 km	MPC · JPL
33521	1999 GK_{40}	—	April 12, 1999	Socorro	LINEAR	EUN	4.6 km	MPC · JPL
33522 Chizumimaeta	1999 GQ_{40}	Chizumimaeta	April 12, 1999	Socorro	LINEAR	V	2.3 km	MPC · JPL
33523 Warashina	1999 GT_{41}	Warashina	April 12, 1999	Socorro	LINEAR	·	2.3 km	MPC · JPL
33524 Rousselot	1999 GM_{48}	Rousselot	April 7, 1999	Anderson Mesa	LONEOS	·	3.3 km	MPC · JPL
33525 Teresinha	1999 GG_{53}	Teresinha	April 11, 1999	Anderson Mesa	LONEOS	(2076)	4.0 km	MPC · JPL
33526	1999 GG_{55}	—	April 6, 1999	Kitt Peak	Spacewatch	·	2.8 km	MPC · JPL
33527	1999 GJ_{55}	—	April 7, 1999	Kitt Peak	Spacewatch	·	2.9 km	MPC · JPL
33528 Jinzeman	1999 HL	Jinzeman	April 17, 1999	Ondřejov	P. Pravec	·	2.9 km	MPC · JPL
33529 Henden	1999 HA_{1}	Henden	April 19, 1999	Fountain Hills	C. W. Juels	·	4.1 km	MPC · JPL
33530	1999 HH_{1}	—	April 19, 1999	Reedy Creek	J. Broughton	·	2.3 km	MPC · JPL
33531	1999 HG_{2}	—	April 20, 1999	Višnjan Observatory	K. Korlević, M. Jurić	·	2.9 km	MPC · JPL
33532 Gabriellacoli	1999 HV_{2}	Gabriellacoli	April 18, 1999	San Marcello	A. Boattini, L. Tesi	·	2.3 km	MPC · JPL
33533	1999 HV_{3}	—	April 19, 1999	Woomera	F. B. Zoltowski	·	2.5 km	MPC · JPL
33534 Meiyamamura	1999 HL_{9}	Meiyamamura	April 17, 1999	Socorro	LINEAR	NYS	2.1 km	MPC · JPL
33535 Alshaikh	1999 HS_{9}	Alshaikh	April 17, 1999	Socorro	LINEAR	·	6.8 km	MPC · JPL
33536 Charpugdee	1999 HU_{9}	Charpugdee	April 17, 1999	Socorro	LINEAR	CLA	5.5 km	MPC · JPL
33537 Doungnga	1999 HJ_{10}	Doungnga	April 17, 1999	Socorro	LINEAR	·	8.0 km	MPC · JPL
33538 Jaredbergen	1999 HR_{10}	Jaredbergen	April 17, 1999	Socorro	LINEAR	·	3.8 km	MPC · JPL
33539 Elenaberman	1999 HU_{10}	Elenaberman	April 17, 1999	Socorro	LINEAR	V	1.7 km	MPC · JPL
33540	1999 JH_{3}	—	May 7, 1999	Nachi-Katsuura	Y. Shimizu, T. Urata	·	9.2 km	MPC · JPL
33541	1999 JF_{6}	—	May 11, 1999	Nachi-Katsuura	Y. Shimizu, T. Urata	·	3.7 km	MPC · JPL
33542	1999 JZ_{7}	—	May 12, 1999	Socorro	LINEAR	·	4.6 km	MPC · JPL
33543	1999 JR_{8}	—	May 13, 1999	Reedy Creek	J. Broughton	·	4.8 km	MPC · JPL
33544 Jerold	1999 JY_{8}	Jerold	May 15, 1999	Fountain Hills	C. W. Juels	EUN	4.0 km	MPC · JPL
33545	1999 JV_{9}	—	May 8, 1999	Catalina	CSS	·	4.9 km	MPC · JPL
33546	1999 JM_{10}	—	May 8, 1999	Catalina	CSS	·	6.9 km	MPC · JPL
33547	1999 JZ_{12}	—	May 15, 1999	Catalina	CSS	·	3.8 km	MPC · JPL
33548	1999 JC_{13}	—	May 10, 1999	Višnjan Observatory	K. Korlević	MAR	4.8 km	MPC · JPL
33549	1999 JS_{13}	—	May 10, 1999	Socorro	LINEAR	·	3.8 km	MPC · JPL
33550 Blackburn	1999 JQ_{14}	Blackburn	May 10, 1999	Socorro	LINEAR	(5)	4.4 km	MPC · JPL
33551	1999 JB_{15}	—	May 12, 1999	Socorro	LINEAR	·	3.4 km	MPC · JPL
33552	1999 JN_{15}	—	May 15, 1999	Catalina	CSS	·	8.3 km	MPC · JPL
33553 Nagai	1999 JQ_{17}	Nagai	May 11, 1999	Nanyo	T. Okuni	·	3.3 km	MPC · JPL
33554	1999 JU_{17}	—	May 10, 1999	Socorro	LINEAR	·	5.3 km	MPC · JPL
33555 Nataliebush	1999 JV_{19}	Nataliebush	May 10, 1999	Socorro	LINEAR	BAP	2.2 km	MPC · JPL
33556 Brennanclark	1999 JR_{20}	Brennanclark	May 10, 1999	Socorro	LINEAR	·	3.1 km	MPC · JPL
33557	1999 JC_{22}	—	May 10, 1999	Socorro	LINEAR	EUN	5.1 km	MPC · JPL
33558	1999 JN_{22}	—	May 10, 1999	Socorro	LINEAR	·	2.3 km	MPC · JPL
33559 Laurencooper	1999 JK_{23}	Laurencooper	May 10, 1999	Socorro	LINEAR	(2076)	4.2 km	MPC · JPL
33560 D'Alessandro	1999 JN_{23}	D'Alessandro	May 10, 1999	Socorro	LINEAR	V	2.6 km	MPC · JPL
33561 Brianjasondu	1999 JA_{24}	Brianjasondu	May 10, 1999	Socorro	LINEAR	·	1.7 km	MPC · JPL
33562 Amydunphy	1999 JO_{24}	Amydunphy	May 10, 1999	Socorro	LINEAR	·	4.4 km	MPC · JPL
33563	1999 JV_{24}	—	May 10, 1999	Socorro	LINEAR	MAR	3.8 km	MPC · JPL
33564 Miriamshira	1999 JP_{25}	Miriamshira	May 10, 1999	Socorro	LINEAR	·	3.1 km	MPC · JPL
33565 Samferguson	1999 JY_{25}	Samferguson	May 10, 1999	Socorro	LINEAR	·	3.5 km	MPC · JPL
33566	1999 JZ_{25}	—	May 10, 1999	Socorro	LINEAR	·	5.7 km	MPC · JPL
33567 Sulekhfrederic	1999 JV_{27}	Sulekhfrederic	May 10, 1999	Socorro	LINEAR	THM	6.1 km	MPC · JPL
33568 Godishala	1999 JN_{29}	Godishala	May 10, 1999	Socorro	LINEAR	·	5.4 km	MPC · JPL
33569 Nikhilgopal	1999 JM_{30}	Nikhilgopal	May 10, 1999	Socorro	LINEAR	·	2.2 km	MPC · JPL
33570 Jagruenstein	1999 JT_{30}	Jagruenstein	May 10, 1999	Socorro	LINEAR	MRX	3.9 km	MPC · JPL
33571 Jaygupta	1999 JD_{32}	Jaygupta	May 10, 1999	Socorro	LINEAR	·	2.8 km	MPC · JPL
33572 Mandolin	1999 JF_{32}	Mandolin	May 10, 1999	Socorro	LINEAR	·	2.3 km	MPC · JPL
33573 Hugrace	1999 JR_{32}	Hugrace	May 10, 1999	Socorro	LINEAR	·	5.6 km	MPC · JPL
33574 Shailaja	1999 JA_{33}	Shailaja	May 10, 1999	Socorro	LINEAR	·	2.4 km	MPC · JPL
33575 Joshuajacob	1999 JR_{33}	Joshuajacob	May 10, 1999	Socorro	LINEAR	·	6.0 km	MPC · JPL
33576	1999 JW_{33}	—	May 10, 1999	Socorro	LINEAR	·	9.9 km	MPC · JPL
33577	1999 JX_{33}	—	May 10, 1999	Socorro	LINEAR	·	6.3 km	MPC · JPL
33578	1999 JT_{34}	—	May 10, 1999	Socorro	LINEAR	·	8.3 km	MPC · JPL
33579	1999 JC_{35}	—	May 10, 1999	Socorro	LINEAR	·	7.0 km	MPC · JPL
33580 Priyankajain	1999 JM_{35}	Priyankajain	May 10, 1999	Socorro	LINEAR	NYS	2.9 km	MPC · JPL
33581 Rajeevjha	1999 JQ_{35}	Rajeevjha	May 10, 1999	Socorro	LINEAR	·	2.9 km	MPC · JPL
33582 Tiashajoardar	1999 JJ_{36}	Tiashajoardar	May 10, 1999	Socorro	LINEAR	·	2.0 km	MPC · JPL
33583 Karamchedu	1999 JV_{36}	Karamchedu	May 10, 1999	Socorro	LINEAR	·	3.7 km	MPC · JPL
33584 Austinkatzer	1999 JY_{37}	Austinkatzer	May 10, 1999	Socorro	LINEAR	V	2.3 km	MPC · JPL
33585	1999 JC_{38}	—	May 10, 1999	Socorro	LINEAR	·	11 km	MPC · JPL
33586 Keeley	1999 JH_{39}	Keeley	May 10, 1999	Socorro	LINEAR	·	6.4 km	MPC · JPL
33587 Arianakim	1999 JA_{42}	Arianakim	May 10, 1999	Socorro	LINEAR	NYS	5.5 km	MPC · JPL
33588	1999 JZ_{45}	—	May 10, 1999	Socorro	LINEAR	·	5.7 km	MPC · JPL
33589 Edwardkim	1999 JM_{46}	Edwardkim	May 10, 1999	Socorro	LINEAR	·	6.4 km	MPC · JPL
33590 Sreelakshmi	1999 JS_{46}	Sreelakshmi	May 10, 1999	Socorro	LINEAR	V	2.2 km	MPC · JPL
33591 Landsberger	1999 JW_{46}	Landsberger	May 10, 1999	Socorro	LINEAR	·	4.0 km	MPC · JPL
33592 Kathrynanna	1999 JJ_{47}	Kathrynanna	May 10, 1999	Socorro	LINEAR	·	6.8 km	MPC · JPL
33593	1999 JT_{47}	—	May 10, 1999	Socorro	LINEAR	·	7.7 km	MPC · JPL
33594 Ralphlawton	1999 JN_{48}	Ralphlawton	May 10, 1999	Socorro	LINEAR	·	3.6 km	MPC · JPL
33595 Jiwoolee	1999 JC_{49}	Jiwoolee	May 10, 1999	Socorro	LINEAR	·	4.0 km	MPC · JPL
33596 Taesoolee	1999 JM_{49}	Taesoolee	May 10, 1999	Socorro	LINEAR	·	6.0 km	MPC · JPL
33597	1999 JQ_{49}	—	May 10, 1999	Socorro	LINEAR	MAS	2.2 km	MPC · JPL
33598 Christineliu	1999 JA_{50}	Christineliu	May 10, 1999	Socorro	LINEAR	·	4.8 km	MPC · JPL
33599 Mckennaloop	1999 JP_{50}	Mckennaloop	May 10, 1999	Socorro	LINEAR	·	2.9 km	MPC · JPL
33600 Davidlu	1999 JA_{51}	Davidlu	May 10, 1999	Socorro	LINEAR	V	2.2 km	MPC · JPL

== 33601–33700 ==
back to top

Designation			Discovery			Properties		Ref
Permanent	Provisional	Named after	Date	Site	Discoverer(s)	Category	Diam.	Ref
33601	1999 JO_{51}	—	May 10, 1999	Socorro	LINEAR	·	6.8 km	MPC · JPL
33602 Varunmandi	1999 JW_{53}	Varunmandi	May 10, 1999	Socorro	LINEAR	·	4.1 km	MPC · JPL
33603 Saramason	1999 JQ_{55}	Saramason	May 10, 1999	Socorro	LINEAR	·	3.4 km	MPC · JPL
33604 McChesney	1999 JW_{55}	McChesney	May 10, 1999	Socorro	LINEAR	·	4.6 km	MPC · JPL
33605 McCue	1999 JD_{56}	McCue	May 10, 1999	Socorro	LINEAR	·	3.0 km	MPC · JPL
33606 Brandonmuncan	1999 JG_{56}	Brandonmuncan	May 10, 1999	Socorro	LINEAR	·	6.1 km	MPC · JPL
33607 Archanamurali	1999 JF_{57}	Archanamurali	May 10, 1999	Socorro	LINEAR	·	7.2 km	MPC · JPL
33608 Paladugu	1999 JA_{59}	Paladugu	May 10, 1999	Socorro	LINEAR	·	5.5 km	MPC · JPL
33609 Harishpalani	1999 JO_{59}	Harishpalani	May 10, 1999	Socorro	LINEAR	·	6.7 km	MPC · JPL
33610 Payra	1999 JF_{60}	Payra	May 10, 1999	Socorro	LINEAR	·	2.7 km	MPC · JPL
33611	1999 JB_{61}	—	May 10, 1999	Socorro	LINEAR	MAR	3.6 km	MPC · JPL
33612	1999 JZ_{62}	—	May 10, 1999	Socorro	LINEAR	·	7.2 km	MPC · JPL
33613 Pendharkar	1999 JO_{63}	Pendharkar	May 10, 1999	Socorro	LINEAR	·	4.8 km	MPC · JPL
33614 Meganploch	1999 JS_{63}	Meganploch	May 10, 1999	Socorro	LINEAR	NEM	7.4 km	MPC · JPL
33615	1999 JB_{64}	—	May 10, 1999	Socorro	LINEAR	·	5.3 km	MPC · JPL
33616	1999 JR_{64}	—	May 10, 1999	Socorro	LINEAR	PHO	6.1 km	MPC · JPL
33617 Kailashraman	1999 JQ_{65}	Kailashraman	May 12, 1999	Socorro	LINEAR	·	2.9 km	MPC · JPL
33618	1999 JA_{66}	—	May 12, 1999	Socorro	LINEAR	NYS	2.9 km	MPC · JPL
33619 Dominickrowan	1999 JB_{66}	Dominickrowan	May 12, 1999	Socorro	LINEAR	·	6.8 km	MPC · JPL
33620	1999 JC_{66}	—	May 12, 1999	Socorro	LINEAR	EOS	5.5 km	MPC · JPL
33621 Sathish	1999 JQ_{67}	Sathish	May 12, 1999	Socorro	LINEAR	·	2.6 km	MPC · JPL
33622 Sedigh	1999 JR_{67}	Sedigh	May 12, 1999	Socorro	LINEAR	·	5.2 km	MPC · JPL
33623 Kyraseevers	1999 JY_{68}	Kyraseevers	May 12, 1999	Socorro	LINEAR	NYS	2.9 km	MPC · JPL
33624 Omersiddiqui	1999 JP_{69}	Omersiddiqui	May 12, 1999	Socorro	LINEAR	·	4.2 km	MPC · JPL
33625 Slepyan	1999 JP_{70}	Slepyan	May 12, 1999	Socorro	LINEAR	·	2.1 km	MPC · JPL
33626 Jasonsmith	1999 JH_{71}	Jasonsmith	May 12, 1999	Socorro	LINEAR	·	2.5 km	MPC · JPL
33627	1999 JS_{71}	—	May 12, 1999	Socorro	LINEAR	·	9.0 km	MPC · JPL
33628 Spettel	1999 JW_{73}	Spettel	May 12, 1999	Socorro	LINEAR	·	2.9 km	MPC · JPL
33629	1999 JK_{76}	—	May 10, 1999	Socorro	LINEAR	·	4.6 km	MPC · JPL
33630 Swathiravi	1999 JM_{76}	Swathiravi	May 10, 1999	Socorro	LINEAR	V	2.9 km	MPC · JPL
33631	1999 JG_{77}	—	May 12, 1999	Socorro	LINEAR	GEF	3.7 km	MPC · JPL
33632	1999 JP_{78}	—	May 13, 1999	Socorro	LINEAR	PHO	3.5 km	MPC · JPL
33633 Strickland	1999 JL_{79}	Strickland	May 13, 1999	Socorro	LINEAR	DOR	7.0 km	MPC · JPL
33634 Strickler	1999 JZ_{79}	Strickler	May 13, 1999	Socorro	LINEAR	·	5.4 km	MPC · JPL
33635	1999 JC_{80}	—	May 12, 1999	Socorro	LINEAR	·	4.5 km	MPC · JPL
33636	1999 JD_{80}	—	May 12, 1999	Socorro	LINEAR	EUN	4.7 km	MPC · JPL
33637	1999 JW_{80}	—	May 12, 1999	Socorro	LINEAR	EUN	4.2 km	MPC · JPL
33638	1999 JZ_{80}	—	May 12, 1999	Socorro	LINEAR	MAR	4.0 km	MPC · JPL
33639	1999 JB_{81}	—	May 12, 1999	Socorro	LINEAR	·	7.0 km	MPC · JPL
33640	1999 JT_{81}	—	May 12, 1999	Socorro	LINEAR	ADE	9.0 km	MPC · JPL
33641	1999 JZ_{81}	—	May 12, 1999	Socorro	LINEAR	EUN · slow	5.6 km	MPC · JPL
33642	1999 JB_{82}	—	May 12, 1999	Socorro	LINEAR	PHO	4.9 km	MPC · JPL
33643	1999 JJ_{82}	—	May 12, 1999	Socorro	LINEAR	EUN	5.2 km	MPC · JPL
33644	1999 JT_{82}	—	May 12, 1999	Socorro	LINEAR	MAR	4.9 km	MPC · JPL
33645	1999 JW_{82}	—	May 12, 1999	Socorro	LINEAR	slow	8.3 km	MPC · JPL
33646	1999 JX_{82}	—	May 12, 1999	Socorro	LINEAR	MAR	5.2 km	MPC · JPL
33647	1999 JE_{83}	—	May 12, 1999	Socorro	LINEAR	·	4.6 km	MPC · JPL
33648	1999 JN_{83}	—	May 12, 1999	Socorro	LINEAR	MAR	4.0 km	MPC · JPL
33649	1999 JR_{83}	—	May 12, 1999	Socorro	LINEAR	EUN	4.2 km	MPC · JPL
33650	1999 JF_{84}	—	May 12, 1999	Socorro	LINEAR	·	4.3 km	MPC · JPL
33651	1999 JG_{84}	—	May 12, 1999	Socorro	LINEAR	MAR	5.4 km	MPC · JPL
33652	1999 JP_{84}	—	May 12, 1999	Socorro	LINEAR	·	4.5 km	MPC · JPL
33653	1999 JR_{84}	—	May 12, 1999	Socorro	LINEAR	EUN	5.0 km	MPC · JPL
33654	1999 JX_{86}	—	May 12, 1999	Socorro	LINEAR	EUN	3.9 km	MPC · JPL
33655 Sumathipala	1999 JT_{88}	Sumathipala	May 12, 1999	Socorro	LINEAR	·	2.8 km	MPC · JPL
33656	1999 JD_{89}	—	May 12, 1999	Socorro	LINEAR	EUN	3.3 km	MPC · JPL
33657	1999 JP_{89}	—	May 12, 1999	Socorro	LINEAR	·	3.7 km	MPC · JPL
33658	1999 JD_{90}	—	May 12, 1999	Socorro	LINEAR	·	2.4 km	MPC · JPL
33659	1999 JM_{91}	—	May 12, 1999	Socorro	LINEAR	·	6.0 km	MPC · JPL
33660 Rishishankar	1999 JS_{91}	Rishishankar	May 12, 1999	Socorro	LINEAR	·	2.2 km	MPC · JPL
33661 Sophiaswartz	1999 JU_{91}	Sophiaswartz	May 12, 1999	Socorro	LINEAR	V	2.1 km	MPC · JPL
33662 Tacescu	1999 JW_{91}	Tacescu	May 12, 1999	Socorro	LINEAR	·	2.9 km	MPC · JPL
33663	1999 JT_{92}	—	May 12, 1999	Socorro	LINEAR	slow	5.1 km	MPC · JPL
33664	1999 JK_{93}	—	May 12, 1999	Socorro	LINEAR	·	4.8 km	MPC · JPL
33665	1999 JR_{93}	—	May 12, 1999	Socorro	LINEAR	EOS	6.1 km	MPC · JPL
33666	1999 JO_{94}	—	May 12, 1999	Socorro	LINEAR	URS	8.5 km	MPC · JPL
33667 Uttripathii	1999 JR_{95}	Uttripathii	May 12, 1999	Socorro	LINEAR	·	7.2 km	MPC · JPL
33668	1999 JO_{97}	—	May 12, 1999	Socorro	LINEAR	ADE	11 km	MPC · JPL
33669	1999 JU_{97}	—	May 12, 1999	Socorro	LINEAR	·	9.5 km	MPC · JPL
33670	1999 JB_{98}	—	May 12, 1999	Socorro	LINEAR	PHO	3.1 km	MPC · JPL
33671	1999 JV_{98}	—	May 12, 1999	Socorro	LINEAR	GEF	5.7 km	MPC · JPL
33672	1999 JU_{99}	—	May 12, 1999	Socorro	LINEAR	·	5.1 km	MPC · JPL
33673	1999 JZ_{99}	—	May 12, 1999	Socorro	LINEAR	·	5.7 km	MPC · JPL
33674	1999 JT_{100}	—	May 12, 1999	Socorro	LINEAR	·	7.9 km	MPC · JPL
33675	1999 JW_{100}	—	May 12, 1999	Socorro	LINEAR	EUN	4.9 km	MPC · JPL
33676	1999 JZ_{101}	—	May 13, 1999	Socorro	LINEAR	AGN	5.7 km	MPC · JPL
33677 Truell	1999 JR_{102}	Truell	May 13, 1999	Socorro	LINEAR	V	1.8 km	MPC · JPL
33678	1999 JW_{106}	—	May 13, 1999	Socorro	LINEAR	·	3.1 km	MPC · JPL
33679	1999 JY_{107}	—	May 13, 1999	Socorro	LINEAR	slow	6.6 km	MPC · JPL
33680 Vasconcelos	1999 JP_{108}	Vasconcelos	May 13, 1999	Socorro	LINEAR	·	3.1 km	MPC · JPL
33681 Wamsley	1999 JV_{109}	Wamsley	May 13, 1999	Socorro	LINEAR	MAS	1.9 km	MPC · JPL
33682 Waylonreid	1999 JO_{113}	Waylonreid	May 13, 1999	Socorro	LINEAR	·	2.5 km	MPC · JPL
33683	1999 JQ_{115}	—	May 13, 1999	Socorro	LINEAR	·	1.9 km	MPC · JPL
33684 Xiaomichael	1999 JW_{119}	Xiaomichael	May 13, 1999	Socorro	LINEAR	V	3.6 km	MPC · JPL
33685 Younglove	1999 JK_{120}	Younglove	May 13, 1999	Socorro	LINEAR	·	3.6 km	MPC · JPL
33686	1999 JC_{122}	—	May 13, 1999	Socorro	LINEAR	EOS	5.1 km	MPC · JPL
33687 Julianbain	1999 JP_{122}	Julianbain	May 13, 1999	Socorro	LINEAR	·	3.8 km	MPC · JPL
33688 Meghnabehari	1999 JQ_{123}	Meghnabehari	May 13, 1999	Socorro	LINEAR	·	5.1 km	MPC · JPL
33689	1999 JM_{126}	—	May 13, 1999	Socorro	LINEAR	EOS	7.9 km	MPC · JPL
33690 Noahcain	1999 JD_{127}	Noahcain	May 13, 1999	Socorro	LINEAR	·	6.8 km	MPC · JPL
33691 Andrewchiang	1999 JT_{131}	Andrewchiang	May 13, 1999	Socorro	LINEAR	EOS	4.6 km	MPC · JPL
33692	1999 JS_{133}	—	May 14, 1999	Catalina	CSS	EUN	3.2 km	MPC · JPL
33693	1999 KA	—	May 16, 1999	Prescott	P. G. Comba	·	6.5 km	MPC · JPL
33694	1999 KN	—	May 16, 1999	Catalina	CSS	PHO	2.7 km	MPC · JPL
33695	1999 KH_{3}	—	May 17, 1999	Kitt Peak	Spacewatch	THM	5.9 km	MPC · JPL
33696 Crouchley	1999 KM_{8}	Crouchley	May 18, 1999	Socorro	LINEAR	NYS	1.8 km	MPC · JPL
33697	1999 KJ_{11}	—	May 18, 1999	Socorro	LINEAR	V	4.5 km	MPC · JPL
33698	1999 KP_{12}	—	May 18, 1999	Socorro	LINEAR	EUN	8.5 km	MPC · JPL
33699 Jessiegan	1999 KT_{12}	Jessiegan	May 18, 1999	Socorro	LINEAR	AST · slow	8.6 km	MPC · JPL
33700 Gluckman	1999 KR_{13}	Gluckman	May 18, 1999	Socorro	LINEAR	NYS	4.4 km	MPC · JPL

== 33701–33800 ==
back to top

Designation			Discovery			Properties		Ref
Permanent	Provisional	Named after	Date	Site	Discoverer(s)	Category	Diam.	Ref
33701 Gotthold	1999 KD_{14}	Gotthold	May 18, 1999	Socorro	LINEAR	·	2.3 km	MPC · JPL
33702 Spencergreen	1999 KD_{15}	Spencergreen	May 18, 1999	Socorro	LINEAR	·	3.2 km	MPC · JPL
33703 Anthonyhill	1999 KZ_{15}	Anthonyhill	May 18, 1999	Socorro	LINEAR	·	4.7 km	MPC · JPL
33704 Herinkang	1999 KY_{16}	Herinkang	May 18, 1999	Socorro	LINEAR	·	4.6 km	MPC · JPL
33705	1999 LJ	—	June 5, 1999	Višnjan Observatory	K. Korlević	·	4.3 km	MPC · JPL
33706	1999 LD_{5}	—	June 10, 1999	Socorro	LINEAR	MAR	3.5 km	MPC · JPL
33707	1999 LW_{8}	—	June 8, 1999	Socorro	LINEAR	·	6.9 km	MPC · JPL
33708	1999 LE_{10}	—	June 8, 1999	Socorro	LINEAR	EUN	5.5 km	MPC · JPL
33709	1999 LK_{10}	—	June 8, 1999	Socorro	LINEAR	EUN	5.0 km	MPC · JPL
33710	1999 LC_{14}	—	June 9, 1999	Socorro	LINEAR	·	4.5 km	MPC · JPL
33711	1999 LH_{15}	—	June 12, 1999	Socorro	LINEAR	·	4.6 km	MPC · JPL
33712	1999 LE_{19}	—	June 10, 1999	Woomera	F. B. Zoltowski	EOS	5.5 km	MPC · JPL
33713 Mithravamshi	1999 LE_{22}	Mithravamshi	June 9, 1999	Socorro	LINEAR	·	4.0 km	MPC · JPL
33714 Sarakaufman	1999 LG_{24}	Sarakaufman	June 9, 1999	Socorro	LINEAR	·	3.8 km	MPC · JPL
33715	1999 LP_{25}	—	June 9, 1999	Socorro	LINEAR	EOS	6.9 km	MPC · JPL
33716	1999 LF_{26}	—	June 9, 1999	Socorro	LINEAR	·	4.6 km	MPC · JPL
33717	1999 LS_{26}	—	June 9, 1999	Socorro	LINEAR	·	8.7 km	MPC · JPL
33718	1999 LZ_{26}	—	June 9, 1999	Socorro	LINEAR	EUN	5.9 km	MPC · JPL
33719	1999 LA_{27}	—	June 9, 1999	Socorro	LINEAR	EUN	7.0 km	MPC · JPL
33720	1999 LD_{27}	—	June 9, 1999	Socorro	LINEAR	·	4.8 km	MPC · JPL
33721	1999 LS_{34}	—	June 12, 1999	Catalina	CSS	DOR	7.5 km	MPC · JPL
33722	1999 NO	—	July 7, 1999	Reedy Creek	J. Broughton	KOR	4.5 km	MPC · JPL
33723	1999 NB_{3}	—	July 13, 1999	Socorro	LINEAR	PHO	4.6 km	MPC · JPL
33724	1999 NW_{4}	—	July 12, 1999	Višnjan Observatory	K. Korlević	·	13 km	MPC · JPL
33725 Robertkent	1999 NJ_{6}	Robertkent	July 13, 1999	Socorro	LINEAR	EOS	5.2 km	MPC · JPL
33726	1999 NJ_{9}	—	July 13, 1999	Socorro	LINEAR	·	9.1 km	MPC · JPL
33727 Kummel	1999 NS_{13}	Kummel	July 14, 1999	Socorro	LINEAR	GEF	4.3 km	MPC · JPL
33728	1999 NO_{16}	—	July 14, 1999	Socorro	LINEAR	·	10 km	MPC · JPL
33729	1999 NJ_{21}	—	July 14, 1999	Socorro	LINEAR	ADE	12 km	MPC · JPL
33730	1999 NH_{23}	—	July 14, 1999	Socorro	LINEAR	EOS	5.7 km	MPC · JPL
33731	1999 NM_{24}	—	July 14, 1999	Socorro	LINEAR	TEL	5.1 km	MPC · JPL
33732	1999 NC_{32}	—	July 14, 1999	Socorro	LINEAR	EOS	9.6 km	MPC · JPL
33733	1999 NU_{32}	—	July 14, 1999	Socorro	LINEAR	·	11 km	MPC · JPL
33734 Stephenlitt	1999 NC_{34}	Stephenlitt	July 14, 1999	Socorro	LINEAR	HYG	8.8 km	MPC · JPL
33735	1999 NW_{34}	—	July 14, 1999	Socorro	LINEAR	EUN	5.9 km	MPC · JPL
33736	1999 NY_{36}	—	July 14, 1999	Socorro	LINEAR	slow	7.0 km	MPC · JPL
33737 Helenlyons	1999 NT_{38}	Helenlyons	July 14, 1999	Socorro	LINEAR	·	5.6 km	MPC · JPL
33738	1999 NY_{41}	—	July 14, 1999	Socorro	LINEAR	·	13 km	MPC · JPL
33739	1999 NK_{43}	—	July 13, 1999	Socorro	LINEAR	EOS	5.9 km	MPC · JPL
33740 Arjunmoorthy	1999 NS_{47}	Arjunmoorthy	July 13, 1999	Socorro	LINEAR	·	3.6 km	MPC · JPL
33741	1999 NB_{50}	—	July 13, 1999	Socorro	LINEAR	·	7.3 km	MPC · JPL
33742	1999 NK_{50}	—	July 13, 1999	Socorro	LINEAR	·	4.4 km	MPC · JPL
33743	1999 NC_{55}	—	July 12, 1999	Socorro	LINEAR	·	22 km	MPC · JPL
33744	1999 NS_{55}	—	July 12, 1999	Socorro	LINEAR	·	11 km	MPC · JPL
33745	1999 NW_{61}	—	July 13, 1999	Socorro	LINEAR	·	5.9 km	MPC · JPL
33746 Sombart	1999 OK	Sombart	July 17, 1999	Pises	Pises	URS	8.4 km	MPC · JPL
33747 Clingan	1999 PK_{4}	Clingan	August 14, 1999	Farpoint	G. Hug	·	5.8 km	MPC · JPL
33748 Davegault	1999 PP_{4}	Davegault	August 15, 1999	Reedy Creek	J. Broughton	·	16 km	MPC · JPL
33749	1999 QO	—	August 19, 1999	Ondřejov	P. Pravec	TEL	5.2 km	MPC · JPL
33750 Davehiggins	1999 RD_{2}	Davehiggins	September 6, 1999	Fountain Hills	C. W. Juels	PAL	12 km	MPC · JPL
33751	1999 RR_{21}	—	September 7, 1999	Socorro	LINEAR	THM	8.8 km	MPC · JPL
33752	1999 RM_{36}	—	September 12, 1999	Črni Vrh	Skvarč, J.	·	6.2 km	MPC · JPL
33753	1999 RW_{42}	—	September 13, 1999	Črni Vrh	Matičič, S.	3:2	16 km	MPC · JPL
33754	1999 RH_{47}	—	September 7, 1999	Socorro	LINEAR	·	5.9 km	MPC · JPL
33755	1999 RU_{47}	—	September 7, 1999	Socorro	LINEAR	·	10 km	MPC · JPL
33756	1999 RF_{48}	—	September 7, 1999	Socorro	LINEAR	EOS	7.0 km	MPC · JPL
33757	1999 RB_{52}	—	September 7, 1999	Socorro	LINEAR	THM ·	9.5 km	MPC · JPL
33758	1999 RY_{55}	—	September 7, 1999	Socorro	LINEAR	·	5.8 km	MPC · JPL
33759	1999 RR_{57}	—	September 7, 1999	Socorro	LINEAR	·	12 km	MPC · JPL
33760	1999 RE_{74}	—	September 7, 1999	Socorro	LINEAR	·	9.5 km	MPC · JPL
33761 Honoranavid	1999 RR_{74}	Honoranavid	September 7, 1999	Socorro	LINEAR	·	4.6 km	MPC · JPL
33762 Sanjayseshan	1999 RV_{83}	Sanjayseshan	September 7, 1999	Socorro	LINEAR	·	4.5 km	MPC · JPL
33763	1999 RB_{84}	—	September 7, 1999	Socorro	LINEAR	·	8.8 km	MPC · JPL
33764	1999 RM_{92}	—	September 7, 1999	Socorro	LINEAR	THM	12 km	MPC · JPL
33765	1999 RK_{100}	—	September 8, 1999	Socorro	LINEAR	·	4.3 km	MPC · JPL
33766	1999 RT_{100}	—	September 8, 1999	Socorro	LINEAR	·	14 km	MPC · JPL
33767	1999 RK_{102}	—	September 8, 1999	Socorro	LINEAR	·	6.4 km	MPC · JPL
33768	1999 RV_{107}	—	September 8, 1999	Socorro	LINEAR	·	9.1 km	MPC · JPL
33769	1999 RN_{112}	—	September 9, 1999	Socorro	LINEAR	·	10 km	MPC · JPL
33770	1999 RF_{128}	—	September 9, 1999	Socorro	LINEAR	·	10 km	MPC · JPL
33771	1999 RJ_{142}	—	September 9, 1999	Socorro	LINEAR	HYG	11 km	MPC · JPL
33772	1999 RF_{145}	—	September 9, 1999	Socorro	LINEAR	·	10 km	MPC · JPL
33773	1999 RL_{145}	—	September 9, 1999	Socorro	LINEAR	·	7.1 km	MPC · JPL
33774	1999 RD_{147}	—	September 9, 1999	Socorro	LINEAR	·	5.0 km	MPC · JPL
33775	1999 RZ_{151}	—	September 9, 1999	Socorro	LINEAR	·	10 km	MPC · JPL
33776	1999 RB_{158}	—	September 9, 1999	Socorro	LINEAR	URS	18 km	MPC · JPL
33777	1999 RM_{158}	—	September 9, 1999	Socorro	LINEAR	THM	12 km	MPC · JPL
33778	1999 RO_{160}	—	September 9, 1999	Socorro	LINEAR	EOS	7.7 km	MPC · JPL
33779	1999 RG_{165}	—	September 9, 1999	Socorro	LINEAR	·	10 km	MPC · JPL
33780	1999 RU_{171}	—	September 9, 1999	Socorro	LINEAR	EOS	7.2 km	MPC · JPL
33781	1999 RP_{174}	—	September 9, 1999	Socorro	LINEAR	·	11 km	MPC · JPL
33782	1999 RW_{178}	—	September 9, 1999	Socorro	LINEAR	CYB	6.7 km	MPC · JPL
33783	1999 RD_{183}	—	September 9, 1999	Socorro	LINEAR	THM	10 km	MPC · JPL
33784	1999 RE_{187}	—	September 9, 1999	Socorro	LINEAR	·	7.8 km	MPC · JPL
33785	1999 RD_{192}	—	September 13, 1999	Socorro	LINEAR	·	5.0 km	MPC · JPL
33786	1999 RJ_{196}	—	September 8, 1999	Socorro	LINEAR	·	7.6 km	MPC · JPL
33787	1999 RJ_{229}	—	September 7, 1999	Kitt Peak	Spacewatch	·	4.9 km	MPC · JPL
33788	1999 RL_{240}	—	September 11, 1999	Anderson Mesa	LONEOS	·	8.8 km	MPC · JPL
33789 Sharmacam	1999 SD_{8}	Sharmacam	September 29, 1999	Socorro	LINEAR	·	3.6 km	MPC · JPL
33790	1999 SA_{9}	—	September 29, 1999	Socorro	LINEAR	ADE	6.5 km	MPC · JPL
33791	1999 SG_{17}	—	September 30, 1999	Socorro	LINEAR	·	3.4 km	MPC · JPL
33792	1999 SU_{18}	—	September 30, 1999	Socorro	LINEAR	TIR	7.6 km	MPC · JPL
33793	1999 SO_{26}	—	September 30, 1999	Socorro	LINEAR	·	13 km	MPC · JPL
33794	1999 TR_{2}	—	October 2, 1999	Fountain Hills	C. W. Juels	·	20 km	MPC · JPL
33795	1999 TR_{6}	—	October 6, 1999	Višnjan Observatory	K. Korlević, M. Jurić	·	9.8 km	MPC · JPL
33796	1999 TP_{37}	—	October 1, 1999	Catalina	CSS	·	14 km	MPC · JPL
33797	1999 TO_{88}	—	October 2, 1999	Socorro	LINEAR	THM	9.0 km	MPC · JPL
33798	1999 TO_{95}	—	October 2, 1999	Socorro	LINEAR	EOS	5.5 km	MPC · JPL
33799 Myra	1999 UV_{2}	Myra	October 19, 1999	Fountain Hills	C. W. Juels	·	3.9 km	MPC · JPL
33800 Gross	1999 VB_{7}	Gross	November 8, 1999	Fountain Hills	C. W. Juels	·	23 km	MPC · JPL

== 33801–33900 ==
back to top

Designation			Discovery			Properties		Ref
Permanent	Provisional	Named after	Date	Site	Discoverer(s)	Category	Diam.	Ref
33801 Emilyshi	1999 VF_{28}	Emilyshi	November 3, 1999	Socorro	LINEAR	·	3.5 km	MPC · JPL
33802	1999 VA_{203}	—	November 8, 1999	Catalina	CSS	EOS	13 km	MPC · JPL
33803 Julienpeloton	1999 VK_{210}	Julienpeloton	November 12, 1999	Anderson Mesa	LONEOS	·	1.8 km	MPC · JPL
33804	1999 WL_{4}	—	November 28, 1999	Oizumi	T. Kobayashi	NYS	5.4 km	MPC · JPL
33805	1999 XQ_{36}	—	December 7, 1999	Fountain Hills	C. W. Juels	·	4.1 km	MPC · JPL
33806 Shrivastava	1999 XW_{39}	Shrivastava	December 6, 1999	Socorro	LINEAR	·	3.8 km	MPC · JPL
33807	1999 XF_{71}	—	December 7, 1999	Socorro	LINEAR	·	3.4 km	MPC · JPL
33808	1999 XD_{114}	—	December 11, 1999	Socorro	LINEAR	·	9.3 km	MPC · JPL
33809 Petrescu	1999 XK_{152}	Petrescu	December 13, 1999	Anderson Mesa	LONEOS	·	3.3 km	MPC · JPL
33810 Tangirala	1999 XZ_{156}	Tangirala	December 8, 1999	Socorro	LINEAR	·	3.7 km	MPC · JPL
33811 Scottobin	1999 XO_{164}	Scottobin	December 8, 1999	Socorro	LINEAR	·	3.4 km	MPC · JPL
33812	1999 XS_{173}	—	December 10, 1999	Socorro	LINEAR	·	12 km	MPC · JPL
33813	1999 XH_{177}	—	December 10, 1999	Socorro	LINEAR	EUN	5.0 km	MPC · JPL
33814 Viswesh	2000 AQ_{15}	Viswesh	January 3, 2000	Socorro	LINEAR	(5)	2.4 km	MPC · JPL
33815	2000 AG_{31}	—	January 3, 2000	Socorro	LINEAR	·	8.6 km	MPC · JPL
33816	2000 AL_{42}	—	January 3, 2000	Socorro	LINEAR	H · slow	1.9 km	MPC · JPL
33817 Fariswald	2000 AF_{64}	Fariswald	January 4, 2000	Socorro	LINEAR	·	3.3 km	MPC · JPL
33818	2000 AK_{97}	—	January 4, 2000	Socorro	LINEAR	URS	15 km	MPC · JPL
33819	2000 AX_{119}	—	January 5, 2000	Socorro	LINEAR	PHO	4.8 km	MPC · JPL
33820	2000 AB_{141}	—	January 5, 2000	Socorro	LINEAR	EUN	7.1 km	MPC · JPL
33821	2000 AF_{200}	—	January 9, 2000	Socorro	LINEAR	·	10 km	MPC · JPL
33822	2000 AA_{231}	—	January 4, 2000	Anderson Mesa	LONEOS	L4	20 km	MPC · JPL
33823 Mariorigutti	2000 CQ_{1}	Mariorigutti	February 3, 2000	San Marcello	M. Tombelli, A. Boattini	KOR	3.5 km	MPC · JPL
33824	2000 DG_{31}	—	February 29, 2000	Socorro	LINEAR	NYS ·	3.0 km	MPC · JPL
33825 Reganwill	2000 DQ_{81}	Reganwill	February 28, 2000	Socorro	LINEAR	·	2.8 km	MPC · JPL
33826 Kevynadams	2000 DW_{82}	Kevynadams	February 28, 2000	Socorro	LINEAR	V	1.8 km	MPC · JPL
33827	2000 ED	—	March 1, 2000	Oizumi	T. Kobayashi	·	5.4 km	MPC · JPL
33828	2000 EP_{44}	—	March 9, 2000	Socorro	LINEAR	·	1.8 km	MPC · JPL
33829 Asherson	2000 EZ_{66}	Asherson	March 10, 2000	Socorro	LINEAR	·	1.5 km	MPC · JPL
33830	2000 EC_{93}	—	March 9, 2000	Socorro	LINEAR	·	18 km	MPC · JPL
33831	2000 EA_{98}	—	March 12, 2000	Socorro	LINEAR	H	1.6 km	MPC · JPL
33832 Johnplane	2000 EE_{135}	Johnplane	March 11, 2000	Anderson Mesa	LONEOS	·	1.6 km	MPC · JPL
33833	2000 EN_{154}	—	March 6, 2000	Haleakala	NEAT	·	4.4 km	MPC · JPL
33834 Hannahkaplan	2000 ES_{158}	Hannahkaplan	March 12, 2000	Anderson Mesa	LONEOS	EUN	5.7 km	MPC · JPL
33835	2000 EQ_{200}	—	March 1, 2000	Catalina	CSS	·	1.6 km	MPC · JPL
33836	2000 FB_{39}	—	March 29, 2000	Socorro	LINEAR	·	1.9 km	MPC · JPL
33837	2000 FQ_{40}	—	March 29, 2000	Socorro	LINEAR	T_{j} (2.98)	7.2 km	MPC · JPL
33838 Brandabaker	2000 GU_{49}	Brandabaker	April 5, 2000	Socorro	LINEAR	THM	7.5 km	MPC · JPL
33839	2000 GQ_{58}	—	April 5, 2000	Socorro	LINEAR	·	2.0 km	MPC · JPL
33840	2000 GR_{63}	—	April 5, 2000	Socorro	LINEAR	·	2.8 km	MPC · JPL
33841	2000 GB_{75}	—	April 5, 2000	Socorro	LINEAR	·	7.0 km	MPC · JPL
33842	2000 GN_{79}	—	April 5, 2000	Socorro	LINEAR	(5)	2.2 km	MPC · JPL
33843	2000 GP_{127}	—	April 11, 2000	Haleakala	NEAT	H	1.6 km	MPC · JPL
33844	2000 GQ_{133}	—	April 7, 2000	Socorro	LINEAR	·	1.7 km	MPC · JPL
33845 Aprilrussell	2000 GT_{157}	Aprilrussell	April 7, 2000	Anderson Mesa	LONEOS	·	1.9 km	MPC · JPL
33846	2000 GO_{167}	—	April 4, 2000	Socorro	LINEAR	·	3.6 km	MPC · JPL
33847	2000 GO_{182}	—	April 3, 2000	Kitt Peak	Spacewatch	·	1.9 km	MPC · JPL
33848	2000 HU_{6}	—	April 24, 2000	Kitt Peak	Spacewatch	·	5.4 km	MPC · JPL
33849	2000 HL_{13}	—	April 28, 2000	Socorro	LINEAR	·	1.5 km	MPC · JPL
33850 Mohammadsaki	2000 HT_{26}	Mohammadsaki	April 24, 2000	Anderson Mesa	LONEOS	PHO	2.4 km	MPC · JPL
33851	2000 HD_{33}	—	April 29, 2000	Socorro	LINEAR	·	5.7 km	MPC · JPL
33852 Baschnagel	2000 HO_{52}	Baschnagel	April 29, 2000	Socorro	LINEAR	V	1.9 km	MPC · JPL
33853	2000 HB_{53}	—	April 29, 2000	Socorro	LINEAR	·	1.7 km	MPC · JPL
33854	2000 HH_{53}	—	April 29, 2000	Socorro	LINEAR	·	5.8 km	MPC · JPL
33855	2000 HS_{60}	—	April 25, 2000	Anderson Mesa	LONEOS	·	3.7 km	MPC · JPL
33856 Rutuparekh	2000 HD_{73}	Rutuparekh	April 27, 2000	Anderson Mesa	LONEOS	·	4.5 km	MPC · JPL
33857	2000 HU_{74}	—	April 27, 2000	Socorro	LINEAR	·	1.7 km	MPC · JPL
33858	2000 HG_{78}	—	April 28, 2000	Socorro	LINEAR	·	12 km	MPC · JPL
33859	2000 HX_{82}	—	April 29, 2000	Socorro	LINEAR	·	1.4 km	MPC · JPL
33860	2000 HZ_{86}	—	April 30, 2000	Kitt Peak	Spacewatch	·	2.7 km	MPC · JPL
33861 Boucvalt	2000 HO_{94}	Boucvalt	April 29, 2000	Socorro	LINEAR	·	2.2 km	MPC · JPL
33862	2000 HS_{99}	—	April 26, 2000	Anderson Mesa	LONEOS	·	3.5 km	MPC · JPL
33863 Elfriederwin	2000 JH_{7}	Elfriederwin	May 5, 2000	Starkenburg Observatory	Starkenburg	·	1.6 km	MPC · JPL
33864	2000 JP_{12}	—	May 6, 2000	Socorro	LINEAR	fast	4.9 km	MPC · JPL
33865	2000 JX_{15}	—	May 4, 2000	Socorro	LINEAR	H	1.4 km	MPC · JPL
33866	2000 JN_{17}	—	May 5, 2000	Socorro	LINEAR	·	7.1 km	MPC · JPL
33867	2000 JO_{18}	—	May 3, 2000	Socorro	LINEAR	·	1.3 km	MPC · JPL
33868	2000 JF_{29}	—	May 7, 2000	Socorro	LINEAR	·	2.9 km	MPC · JPL
33869 Brunnermatt	2000 JK_{32}	Brunnermatt	May 7, 2000	Socorro	LINEAR	·	3.0 km	MPC · JPL
33870	2000 JP_{32}	—	May 7, 2000	Socorro	LINEAR	(18466)	6.8 km	MPC · JPL
33871 Locastillo	2000 JK_{34}	Locastillo	May 7, 2000	Socorro	LINEAR	·	1.8 km	MPC · JPL
33872 Kristichung	2000 JX_{39}	Kristichung	May 7, 2000	Socorro	LINEAR	·	3.5 km	MPC · JPL
33873	2000 JS_{52}	—	May 9, 2000	Socorro	LINEAR	·	6.7 km	MPC · JPL
33874	2000 JF_{53}	—	May 9, 2000	Socorro	LINEAR	EUN	5.2 km	MPC · JPL
33875 Laurencooney	2000 JY_{54}	Laurencooney	May 6, 2000	Socorro	LINEAR	V	1.7 km	MPC · JPL
33876	2000 JJ_{57}	—	May 6, 2000	Socorro	LINEAR	·	6.4 km	MPC · JPL
33877	2000 JR_{57}	—	May 6, 2000	Socorro	LINEAR	·	3.2 km	MPC · JPL
33878	2000 JW_{61}	—	May 7, 2000	Socorro	LINEAR	·	1.8 km	MPC · JPL
33879 Kierstendeen	2000 JG_{62}	Kierstendeen	May 7, 2000	Socorro	LINEAR	·	2.3 km	MPC · JPL
33880	2000 JD_{65}	—	May 5, 2000	Socorro	LINEAR	·	2.8 km	MPC · JPL
33881	2000 JK_{66}	—	May 6, 2000	Socorro	LINEAR	·	3.9 km	MPC · JPL
33882 Schönbächler	2000 JM_{74}	Schönbächler	May 4, 2000	Anderson Mesa	LONEOS	V	1.5 km	MPC · JPL
33883	2000 KD_{4}	—	May 27, 2000	Reedy Creek	J. Broughton	NYS ·	5.1 km	MPC · JPL
33884	2000 KX_{9}	—	May 28, 2000	Socorro	LINEAR	·	1.8 km	MPC · JPL
33885	2000 KF_{16}	—	May 28, 2000	Socorro	LINEAR	·	2.1 km	MPC · JPL
33886 Lilydeveau	2000 KU_{18}	Lilydeveau	May 28, 2000	Socorro	LINEAR	·	3.2 km	MPC · JPL
33887	2000 KF_{19}	—	May 28, 2000	Socorro	LINEAR	·	2.3 km	MPC · JPL
33888	2000 KG_{21}	—	May 29, 2000	Anderson Mesa	LONEOS	H	1.8 km	MPC · JPL
33889 Jengebo	2000 KZ_{22}	Jengebo	May 28, 2000	Socorro	LINEAR	·	1.9 km	MPC · JPL
33890	2000 KQ_{24}	—	May 28, 2000	Socorro	LINEAR	NYS	2.2 km	MPC · JPL
33891	2000 KS_{24}	—	May 28, 2000	Socorro	LINEAR	NYS	2.8 km	MPC · JPL
33892 Meligingrich	2000 KP_{25}	Meligingrich	May 28, 2000	Socorro	LINEAR	·	2.8 km	MPC · JPL
33893	2000 KB_{26}	—	May 28, 2000	Socorro	LINEAR	ADE	6.4 km	MPC · JPL
33894	2000 KM_{30}	—	May 28, 2000	Socorro	LINEAR	·	13 km	MPC · JPL
33895	2000 KM_{31}	—	May 28, 2000	Socorro	LINEAR	·	3.0 km	MPC · JPL
33896 Hickson	2000 KL_{40}	Hickson	May 30, 2000	Anderson Mesa	LONEOS	H	2.6 km	MPC · JPL
33897 Erikagreen	2000 KU_{41}	Erikagreen	May 27, 2000	Socorro	LINEAR	·	2.8 km	MPC · JPL
33898 Kendra	2000 KQ_{53}	Kendra	May 29, 2000	Socorro	LINEAR	·	3.5 km	MPC · JPL
33899	2000 KE_{55}	—	May 27, 2000	Socorro	LINEAR	·	5.2 km	MPC · JPL
33900	2000 KS_{55}	—	May 27, 2000	Socorro	LINEAR	NYS	3.0 km	MPC · JPL

== 33901–34000 ==
back to top

Designation			Discovery			Properties		Ref
Permanent	Provisional	Named after	Date	Site	Discoverer(s)	Category	Diam.	Ref
33901	2000 KJ_{56}	—	May 27, 2000	Socorro	LINEAR	·	4.7 km	MPC · JPL
33902 Ingoldsby	2000 KU_{64}	Ingoldsby	May 27, 2000	Socorro	LINEAR	·	2.3 km	MPC · JPL
33903 Youssefmoulane	2000 KH_{68}	Youssefmoulane	May 30, 2000	Anderson Mesa	LONEOS	·	18 km	MPC · JPL
33904 Janardhanan	2000 KC_{77}	Janardhanan	May 27, 2000	Socorro	LINEAR	·	3.4 km	MPC · JPL
33905 Leyajoykutty	2000 KB_{80}	Leyajoykutty	May 27, 2000	Socorro	LINEAR	V	2.0 km	MPC · JPL
33906	2000 KL_{81}	—	May 26, 2000	Kitt Peak	Spacewatch	·	2.6 km	MPC · JPL
33907 Christykrenek	2000 LP_{4}	Christykrenek	June 5, 2000	Socorro	LINEAR	·	2.8 km	MPC · JPL
33908	2000 LL_{6}	—	June 5, 2000	Socorro	LINEAR	H	1.4 km	MPC · JPL
33909	2000 LU_{7}	—	June 5, 2000	Socorro	LINEAR	·	9.9 km	MPC · JPL
33910 Lestarge	2000 LJ_{9}	Lestarge	June 5, 2000	Socorro	LINEAR	·	2.3 km	MPC · JPL
33911	2000 LM_{11}	—	June 4, 2000	Socorro	LINEAR	·	4.9 km	MPC · JPL
33912 Melissanoland	2000 LV_{13}	Melissanoland	June 6, 2000	Socorro	LINEAR	·	2.9 km	MPC · JPL
33913	2000 LK_{14}	—	June 7, 2000	Socorro	LINEAR	·	7.8 km	MPC · JPL
33914	2000 LN_{14}	—	June 7, 2000	Socorro	LINEAR	·	5.5 km	MPC · JPL
33915	2000 LA_{15}	—	June 5, 2000	Črni Vrh	Mikuž, H.	(2076)	3.6 km	MPC · JPL
33916	2000 LF_{19}	—	June 8, 2000	Socorro	LINEAR	·	4.1 km	MPC · JPL
33917 Kellyoconnor	2000 LK_{19}	Kellyoconnor	June 8, 2000	Socorro	LINEAR	·	3.7 km	MPC · JPL
33918 Janiscoville	2000 LL_{19}	Janiscoville	June 8, 2000	Socorro	LINEAR	·	3.3 km	MPC · JPL
33919	2000 LV_{19}	—	June 8, 2000	Socorro	LINEAR	·	6.8 km	MPC · JPL
33920 Trivisonno	2000 LZ_{20}	Trivisonno	June 8, 2000	Socorro	LINEAR	·	2.9 km	MPC · JPL
33921	2000 LC_{21}	—	June 8, 2000	Socorro	LINEAR	·	13 km	MPC · JPL
33922	2000 LB_{23}	—	June 6, 2000	Kitt Peak	Spacewatch	·	7.5 km	MPC · JPL
33923 Juliewarren	2000 LH_{25}	Juliewarren	June 7, 2000	Socorro	LINEAR	·	2.7 km	MPC · JPL
33924 Rosanaaraujo	2000 LS_{26}	Rosanaaraujo	June 1, 2000	Anderson Mesa	LONEOS	·	3.7 km	MPC · JPL
33925	2000 LB_{27}	—	June 11, 2000	Valinhos	P. R. Holvorcem	·	2.7 km	MPC · JPL
33926 Normand	2000 LC_{27}	Normand	June 6, 2000	Anderson Mesa	LONEOS	·	4.9 km	MPC · JPL
33927 Jenniferscully	2000 LH_{27}	Jenniferscully	June 6, 2000	Anderson Mesa	LONEOS	·	1.9 km	MPC · JPL
33928 Aswinsekhar	2000 LJ_{27}	Aswinsekhar	June 6, 2000	Anderson Mesa	LONEOS	·	4.5 km	MPC · JPL
33929 Lisaprato	2000 LP_{27}	Lisaprato	June 6, 2000	Anderson Mesa	LONEOS	NYS	4.6 km	MPC · JPL
33930	2000 LQ_{27}	—	June 6, 2000	Anderson Mesa	LONEOS	·	3.6 km	MPC · JPL
33931 Alexeysergeyev	2000 LW_{28}	Alexeysergeyev	June 6, 2000	Anderson Mesa	LONEOS	·	2.3 km	MPC · JPL
33932 Keane	2000 LZ_{28}	Keane	June 6, 2000	Anderson Mesa	LONEOS	HYG	9.6 km	MPC · JPL
33933 Timlister	2000 LE_{29}	Timlister	June 9, 2000	Anderson Mesa	LONEOS	·	3.0 km	MPC · JPL
33934	2000 LA_{30}	—	June 7, 2000	Socorro	LINEAR	NYS	3.0 km	MPC · JPL
33935	2000 LH_{30}	—	June 7, 2000	Socorro	LINEAR	CYB	10 km	MPC · JPL
33936 Johnwells	2000 LL_{30}	Johnwells	June 7, 2000	Socorro	LINEAR	·	3.6 km	MPC · JPL
33937 Raphaelmarschall	2000 LZ_{31}	Raphaelmarschall	June 5, 2000	Anderson Mesa	LONEOS	ADE	9.7 km	MPC · JPL
33938	2000 LT_{33}	—	June 4, 2000	Haleakala	NEAT	·	3.1 km	MPC · JPL
33939	2000 LO_{35}	—	June 1, 2000	Anderson Mesa	LONEOS	·	4.8 km	MPC · JPL
33940 Morgado	2000 LS_{35}	Morgado	June 1, 2000	Anderson Mesa	LONEOS	·	6.6 km	MPC · JPL
33941 Mouginot	2000 LX_{35}	Mouginot	June 1, 2000	Anderson Mesa	LONEOS	·	2.5 km	MPC · JPL
33942 Davidmiller	2000 LA_{36}	Davidmiller	June 1, 2000	Anderson Mesa	LONEOS	·	3.5 km	MPC · JPL
33943	2000 LE_{36}	—	June 1, 2000	Haleakala	NEAT	SUL	7.5 km	MPC · JPL
33944	2000 MA	—	June 16, 2000	Valinhos	P. R. Holvorcem	·	2.5 km	MPC · JPL
33945	2000 MR	—	June 24, 2000	Haleakala	NEAT	PHO	2.9 km	MPC · JPL
33946	2000 MV	—	June 24, 2000	Reedy Creek	J. Broughton	·	1.7 km	MPC · JPL
33947	2000 ML_{1}	—	June 25, 2000	Socorro	LINEAR	·	7.9 km	MPC · JPL
33948	2000 MA_{2}	—	June 25, 2000	Farpoint	Farpoint	·	2.0 km	MPC · JPL
33949	2000 MP_{4}	—	June 25, 2000	Socorro	LINEAR	·	4.9 km	MPC · JPL
33950	2000 MY_{4}	—	June 25, 2000	Socorro	LINEAR	·	3.7 km	MPC · JPL
33951	2000 MD_{5}	—	June 26, 2000	Socorro	LINEAR	·	5.5 km	MPC · JPL
33952	2000 ML_{5}	—	June 26, 2000	Socorro	LINEAR	PHO	5.0 km	MPC · JPL
33953	2000 MM_{6}	—	June 30, 2000	Haleakala	NEAT	·	2.3 km	MPC · JPL
33954	2000 ND	—	July 1, 2000	Prescott	P. G. Comba	·	2.1 km	MPC · JPL
33955	2000 NC_{3}	—	July 6, 2000	Prescott	P. G. Comba	·	2.3 km	MPC · JPL
33956	2000 NN_{3}	—	July 3, 2000	Socorro	LINEAR	EUN · moon	6.8 km	MPC · JPL
33957	2000 NG_{5}	—	July 7, 2000	Socorro	LINEAR	·	3.4 km	MPC · JPL
33958 Zaferiou	2000 NK_{5}	Zaferiou	July 7, 2000	Socorro	LINEAR	(2076)	3.7 km	MPC · JPL
33959	2000 ND_{6}	—	July 3, 2000	Kitt Peak	Spacewatch	·	2.1 km	MPC · JPL
33960	2000 NJ_{9}	—	July 7, 2000	Socorro	LINEAR	·	7.3 km	MPC · JPL
33961 Macinleyneve	2000 NO_{9}	Macinleyneve	July 7, 2000	Socorro	LINEAR	NYS	2.5 km	MPC · JPL
33962	2000 NR_{9}	—	July 6, 2000	Socorro	LINEAR	EUN	5.3 km	MPC · JPL
33963 Moranhidalgo	2000 NA_{10}	Moranhidalgo	July 7, 2000	Socorro	LINEAR	·	2.6 km	MPC · JPL
33964 Patrickshober	2000 NS_{10}	Patrickshober	July 6, 2000	Anderson Mesa	LONEOS	V	2.4 km	MPC · JPL
33965	2000 NY_{10}	—	July 10, 2000	Valinhos	P. R. Holvorcem	·	3.6 km	MPC · JPL
33966	2000 NC_{11}	—	July 10, 2000	Valinhos	P. R. Holvorcem	slow	2.7 km	MPC · JPL
33967	2000 NO_{12}	—	July 5, 2000	Anderson Mesa	LONEOS	·	4.4 km	MPC · JPL
33968	2000 NF_{13}	—	July 5, 2000	Anderson Mesa	LONEOS	·	2.8 km	MPC · JPL
33969	2000 NM_{13}	—	July 5, 2000	Anderson Mesa	LONEOS	HNS	3.7 km	MPC · JPL
33970 Conorbenson	2000 NC_{14}	Conorbenson	July 5, 2000	Anderson Mesa	LONEOS	TEL	3.9 km	MPC · JPL
33971 Alexdavis	2000 NL_{14}	Alexdavis	July 5, 2000	Anderson Mesa	LONEOS	·	3.3 km	MPC · JPL
33972 Fuentesmuñoz	2000 NO_{15}	Fuentesmuñoz	July 5, 2000	Anderson Mesa	LONEOS	·	2.2 km	MPC · JPL
33973 Xiyunhou	2000 NS_{16}	Xiyunhou	July 5, 2000	Anderson Mesa	LONEOS	GEF	4.3 km	MPC · JPL
33974 Alexmeyer	2000 ND_{17}	Alexmeyer	July 5, 2000	Anderson Mesa	LONEOS	SUL	7.1 km	MPC · JPL
33975 Shotatakahashi	2000 NF_{17}	Shotatakahashi	July 5, 2000	Anderson Mesa	LONEOS	·	4.6 km	MPC · JPL
33976 Van Wal	2000 NL_{19}	Van Wal	July 5, 2000	Anderson Mesa	LONEOS	·	2.1 km	MPC · JPL
33977	2000 NY_{19}	—	July 5, 2000	Anderson Mesa	LONEOS	(5)	3.2 km	MPC · JPL
33978	2000 NX_{20}	—	July 6, 2000	Anderson Mesa	LONEOS	·	2.1 km	MPC · JPL
33979 Sunhaochun	2000 NJ_{21}	Sunhaochun	July 7, 2000	Socorro	LINEAR	·	3.3 km	MPC · JPL
33980	2000 NW_{21}	—	July 7, 2000	Socorro	LINEAR	·	4.8 km	MPC · JPL
33981	2000 NH_{22}	—	July 7, 2000	Anderson Mesa	LONEOS	·	6.9 km	MPC · JPL
33982	2000 NQ_{23}	—	July 5, 2000	Anderson Mesa	LONEOS	·	5.0 km	MPC · JPL
33983	2000 NV_{23}	—	July 5, 2000	Anderson Mesa	LONEOS	·	3.3 km	MPC · JPL
33984	2000 NU_{24}	—	July 4, 2000	Anderson Mesa	LONEOS	·	4.1 km	MPC · JPL
33985	2000 NG_{25}	—	July 4, 2000	Anderson Mesa	LONEOS	·	4.6 km	MPC · JPL
33986	2000 NK_{25}	—	July 4, 2000	Anderson Mesa	LONEOS	ERI	4.5 km	MPC · JPL
33987	2000 NV_{25}	—	July 4, 2000	Anderson Mesa	LONEOS	·	2.6 km	MPC · JPL
33988	2000 NQ_{26}	—	July 4, 2000	Anderson Mesa	LONEOS	·	3.3 km	MPC · JPL
33989	2000 NC_{27}	—	July 4, 2000	Anderson Mesa	LONEOS	·	2.2 km	MPC · JPL
33990 Kathleenmcbride	2000 ND_{27}	Kathleenmcbride	July 4, 2000	Anderson Mesa	LONEOS	NYS	3.6 km	MPC · JPL
33991 Weixunjing	2000 NB_{28}	Weixunjing	July 3, 2000	Socorro	LINEAR	·	3.4 km	MPC · JPL
33992	2000 OQ	—	July 23, 2000	Reedy Creek	J. Broughton	·	3.3 km	MPC · JPL
33993	2000 OS	—	July 23, 2000	Reedy Creek	J. Broughton	·	3.8 km	MPC · JPL
33994 Regidufour	2000 OR_{1}	Regidufour	July 26, 2000	Needville	Needville	·	2.3 km	MPC · JPL
33995	2000 OV_{1}	—	July 26, 2000	Farpoint	Farpoint	·	1.4 km	MPC · JPL
33996	2000 OK_{2}	—	July 28, 2000	Prescott	P. G. Comba	·	2.6 km	MPC · JPL
33997	2000 OK_{3}	—	July 24, 2000	Socorro	LINEAR	·	20 km	MPC · JPL
33998	2000 OW_{3}	—	July 24, 2000	Socorro	LINEAR	·	2.4 km	MPC · JPL
33999	2000 OG_{4}	—	July 24, 2000	Socorro	LINEAR	EOS	5.6 km	MPC · JPL
34000 Martinmatl	2000 OL_{4}	Martinmatl	July 24, 2000	Socorro	LINEAR	·	4.5 km	MPC · JPL

back to top

== See also ==
- Meanings of minor-planet names: 33001–34000
