= List of minor planets: 32001–33000 =

The following is a partial list of minor planets, running from minor-planet number 32001 through 33000, inclusive. The primary data for this and other partial lists is based on JPL's "Small-Body Orbital Elements" and data available from the Minor Planet Center. Critical list information is also provided by the MPC, unless otherwise specified from Lowell Observatory. A detailed description of the table's columns and additional sources are given on the main page including a complete list of every page in this series, and a statistical break-up on the dynamical classification of minor planets.

Also see the summary list of all named bodies in numerical and alphabetical order, and the corresponding naming citations for the number range of this particular list. New namings may only be added to this list after official publication, as the preannouncement of names is condemned by the Working Group for Small Bodies Nomenclature of the International Astronomical Union.

Near-Earth obj.	MBA (inner)	MBA (outer)	Centaur
Mars-crosser	MBA (middle)	Jupiter trojan	Trans-Neptunian obj.
Unclassified

== 32001–32100 ==
Designation			Discovery			Properties		Ref
Permanent	Provisional	Named after	Date	Site	Discoverer(s)	Category	Diam.	Ref
32001 Golbin	2000 HF_{51}	Golbin	April 29, 2000	Socorro	LINEAR	·	2.7 km	MPC · JPL
32002 Gorokhovsky	2000 HK_{51}	Gorokhovsky	April 29, 2000	Socorro	LINEAR	·	4.8 km	MPC · JPL
32003	2000 HN_{51}	—	April 29, 2000	Socorro	LINEAR	·	11 km	MPC · JPL
32004	2000 HR_{51}	—	April 29, 2000	Socorro	LINEAR	·	3.6 km	MPC · JPL
32005 Roberthalfon	2000 HG_{52}	Roberthalfon	April 29, 2000	Socorro	LINEAR	·	2.0 km	MPC · JPL
32006 Hallisey	2000 HM_{52}	Hallisey	April 29, 2000	Socorro	LINEAR	·	2.3 km	MPC · JPL
32007 Amirhelmy	2000 HY_{52}	Amirhelmy	April 29, 2000	Socorro	LINEAR	·	4.9 km	MPC · JPL
32008 Adriángalád	2000 HM_{53}	Adriángalád	April 29, 2000	Socorro	LINEAR	moon	3.4 km	MPC · JPL
32009	2000 HN_{54}	—	April 29, 2000	Socorro	LINEAR	·	4.0 km	MPC · JPL
32010	2000 HW_{54}	—	April 29, 2000	Socorro	LINEAR	·	4.1 km	MPC · JPL
32011	2000 HF_{56}	—	April 24, 2000	Anderson Mesa	LONEOS	EOS	8.4 km	MPC · JPL
32012	2000 HE_{57}	—	April 24, 2000	Anderson Mesa	LONEOS	MAR	3.0 km	MPC · JPL
32013 Elkekersten	2000 HJ_{57}	Elkekersten	April 24, 2000	Anderson Mesa	LONEOS	·	2.9 km	MPC · JPL
32014 Bida	2000 HL_{64}	Bida	April 26, 2000	Anderson Mesa	LONEOS	·	3.1 km	MPC · JPL
32015	2000 HC_{67}	—	April 27, 2000	Socorro	LINEAR	·	2.9 km	MPC · JPL
32016	2000 HC_{76}	—	April 27, 2000	Socorro	LINEAR	·	4.6 km	MPC · JPL
32017	2000 HC_{77}	—	April 27, 2000	Socorro	LINEAR	·	2.4 km	MPC · JPL
32018 Robhenning	2000 HD_{78}	Robhenning	April 28, 2000	Socorro	LINEAR	V	1.9 km	MPC · JPL
32019 Krithikaiyer	2000 HK_{83}	Krithikaiyer	April 29, 2000	Socorro	LINEAR	·	2.4 km	MPC · JPL
32020	2000 HZ_{87}	—	April 27, 2000	Socorro	LINEAR	EUN	5.0 km	MPC · JPL
32021 Lilyjenkins	2000 HE_{88}	Lilyjenkins	April 27, 2000	Socorro	LINEAR	·	3.6 km	MPC · JPL
32022 Sarahjenkins	2000 HH_{88}	Sarahjenkins	April 27, 2000	Socorro	LINEAR	·	2.1 km	MPC · JPL
32023	2000 HO_{89}	—	April 29, 2000	Socorro	LINEAR	·	3.0 km	MPC · JPL
32024	2000 HP_{89}	—	April 29, 2000	Socorro	LINEAR	NYS	2.9 km	MPC · JPL
32025 Karanjerath	2000 HX_{89}	Karanjerath	April 29, 2000	Socorro	LINEAR	·	2.5 km	MPC · JPL
32026	2000 HQ_{90}	—	April 27, 2000	Anderson Mesa	LONEOS	·	3.5 km	MPC · JPL
32027 Jupitercheng	2000 HO_{100}	Jupitercheng	April 24, 2000	Anderson Mesa	LONEOS	V	2.0 km	MPC · JPL
32028	2000 JU_{12}	—	May 6, 2000	Socorro	LINEAR	·	3.3 km	MPC · JPL
32029	2000 JJ_{14}	—	May 6, 2000	Socorro	LINEAR	·	3.4 km	MPC · JPL
32030	2000 JX_{14}	—	May 6, 2000	Socorro	LINEAR	EOS	7.1 km	MPC · JPL
32031 Joyjin	2000 JC_{16}	Joyjin	May 5, 2000	Socorro	LINEAR	·	1.5 km	MPC · JPL
32032 Askandola	2000 JG_{16}	Askandola	May 5, 2000	Socorro	LINEAR	·	4.3 km	MPC · JPL
32033 Arjunkapoor	2000 JV_{16}	Arjunkapoor	May 9, 2000	Socorro	LINEAR	·	2.6 km	MPC · JPL
32034 Sophiakorner	2000 JE_{17}	Sophiakorner	May 5, 2000	Socorro	LINEAR	·	2.5 km	MPC · JPL
32035	2000 JS_{18}	—	May 3, 2000	Socorro	LINEAR	·	5.2 km	MPC · JPL
32036	2000 JP_{19}	—	May 4, 2000	Socorro	LINEAR	PHO	3.6 km	MPC · JPL
32037 Deepikakurup	2000 JZ_{21}	Deepikakurup	May 6, 2000	Socorro	LINEAR	NYS ·	4.9 km	MPC · JPL
32038 Kwiecinski	2000 JN_{22}	Kwiecinski	May 6, 2000	Socorro	LINEAR	·	2.5 km	MPC · JPL
32039	2000 JO_{23}	—	May 7, 2000	Socorro	LINEAR	moon	3.3 km	MPC · JPL
32040	2000 JH_{26}	—	May 7, 2000	Socorro	LINEAR	·	2.1 km	MPC · JPL
32041	2000 JP_{26}	—	May 7, 2000	Socorro	LINEAR	·	4.8 km	MPC · JPL
32042	2000 JZ_{26}	—	May 7, 2000	Socorro	LINEAR	·	2.7 km	MPC · JPL
32043	2000 JO_{27}	—	May 7, 2000	Socorro	LINEAR	·	3.9 km	MPC · JPL
32044 Lakmazaheri	2000 JB_{28}	Lakmazaheri	May 7, 2000	Socorro	LINEAR	·	2.6 km	MPC · JPL
32045	2000 JD_{28}	—	May 7, 2000	Socorro	LINEAR	·	5.2 km	MPC · JPL
32046	2000 JR_{28}	—	May 7, 2000	Socorro	LINEAR	·	3.1 km	MPC · JPL
32047 Wenjiali	2000 JW_{28}	Wenjiali	May 7, 2000	Socorro	LINEAR	·	3.1 km	MPC · JPL
32048 Kathyliu	2000 JM_{31}	Kathyliu	May 7, 2000	Socorro	LINEAR	NYS	2.7 km	MPC · JPL
32049 Jonathanma	2000 JJ_{32}	Jonathanma	May 7, 2000	Socorro	LINEAR	·	2.7 km	MPC · JPL
32050	2000 JA_{37}	—	May 7, 2000	Socorro	LINEAR	·	3.6 km	MPC · JPL
32051 Sadhikamalladi	2000 JF_{37}	Sadhikamalladi	May 7, 2000	Socorro	LINEAR	SUL	5.7 km	MPC · JPL
32052 Diyamathur	2000 JJ_{37}	Diyamathur	May 7, 2000	Socorro	LINEAR	·	2.6 km	MPC · JPL
32053 Demetrimaxim	2000 JN_{37}	Demetrimaxim	May 7, 2000	Socorro	LINEAR	·	2.8 km	MPC · JPL
32054 Musunuri	2000 JT_{37}	Musunuri	May 7, 2000	Socorro	LINEAR	·	2.8 km	MPC · JPL
32055	2000 JS_{39}	—	May 7, 2000	Socorro	LINEAR	·	5.8 km	MPC · JPL
32056 Abrarnadroo	2000 JM_{41}	Abrarnadroo	May 7, 2000	Socorro	LINEAR	·	1.8 km	MPC · JPL
32057 Ethannovek	2000 JT_{41}	Ethannovek	May 7, 2000	Socorro	LINEAR	·	2.8 km	MPC · JPL
32058 Charlesnoyes	2000 JW_{43}	Charlesnoyes	May 7, 2000	Socorro	LINEAR	·	2.7 km	MPC · JPL
32059 Ruchipandya	2000 JE_{44}	Ruchipandya	May 7, 2000	Socorro	LINEAR	·	2.5 km	MPC · JPL
32060 Wyattpontius	2000 JN_{46}	Wyattpontius	May 7, 2000	Socorro	LINEAR	·	5.9 km	MPC · JPL
32061	2000 JK_{48}	—	May 9, 2000	Socorro	LINEAR	·	6.3 km	MPC · JPL
32062 Amolpunjabi	2000 JQ_{49}	Amolpunjabi	May 9, 2000	Socorro	LINEAR	·	1.9 km	MPC · JPL
32063 Pusapaty	2000 JF_{51}	Pusapaty	May 9, 2000	Socorro	LINEAR	·	4.0 km	MPC · JPL
32064	2000 JU_{51}	—	May 9, 2000	Socorro	LINEAR	·	6.2 km	MPC · JPL
32065 Radulovacki	2000 JC_{52}	Radulovacki	May 9, 2000	Socorro	LINEAR	·	2.8 km	MPC · JPL
32066 Ramayya	2000 JK_{52}	Ramayya	May 9, 2000	Socorro	LINEAR	V	2.3 km	MPC · JPL
32067 Ranganathan	2000 JW_{56}	Ranganathan	May 6, 2000	Socorro	LINEAR	·	3.1 km	MPC · JPL
32068	2000 JE_{58}	—	May 6, 2000	Socorro	LINEAR	fast	4.0 km	MPC · JPL
32069 Mayarao	2000 JS_{60}	Mayarao	May 7, 2000	Socorro	LINEAR	·	2.3 km	MPC · JPL
32070 Michaelretchin	2000 JC_{61}	Michaelretchin	May 7, 2000	Socorro	LINEAR	·	2.6 km	MPC · JPL
32071 Matthewretchin	2000 JG_{61}	Matthewretchin	May 7, 2000	Socorro	LINEAR	·	4.7 km	MPC · JPL
32072 Revanur	2000 JL_{61}	Revanur	May 7, 2000	Socorro	LINEAR	·	7.0 km	MPC · JPL
32073 Cassidyryan	2000 JT_{61}	Cassidyryan	May 7, 2000	Socorro	LINEAR	·	4.0 km	MPC · JPL
32074 Kevinsadhu	2000 JF_{64}	Kevinsadhu	May 10, 2000	Socorro	LINEAR	·	2.4 km	MPC · JPL
32075	2000 JU_{66}	—	May 1, 2000	Kitt Peak	Spacewatch	EOS	7.1 km	MPC · JPL
32076	2000 JA_{70}	—	May 2, 2000	Anderson Mesa	LONEOS	PHO	3.4 km	MPC · JPL
32077	2000 JW_{72}	—	May 2, 2000	Anderson Mesa	LONEOS	·	1.8 km	MPC · JPL
32078 Jamesavoldelli	2000 JQ_{75}	Jamesavoldelli	May 5, 2000	Socorro	LINEAR	·	1.6 km	MPC · JPL
32079 Hughsavoldelli	2000 JT_{75}	Hughsavoldelli	May 5, 2000	Socorro	LINEAR	·	2.6 km	MPC · JPL
32080 Sanashareef	2000 JG_{77}	Sanashareef	May 7, 2000	Socorro	LINEAR	fast	3.2 km	MPC · JPL
32081	2000 JT_{77}	—	May 9, 2000	Socorro	LINEAR	·	1.9 km	MPC · JPL
32082 Sominsky	2000 JH_{83}	Sominsky	May 7, 2000	Socorro	LINEAR	·	3.9 km	MPC · JPL
32083	2000 KO	—	May 24, 2000	Črni Vrh	Mikuž, H.	·	2.9 km	MPC · JPL
32084	2000 KP_{5}	—	May 28, 2000	Kitt Peak	Spacewatch	V	1.5 km	MPC · JPL
32085 Tomback	2000 KD_{8}	Tomback	May 27, 2000	Socorro	LINEAR	·	4.5 km	MPC · JPL
32086 Viviannetu	2000 KV_{17}	Viviannetu	May 28, 2000	Socorro	LINEAR	HYG	6.4 km	MPC · JPL
32087 Vemulapalli	2000 KB_{25}	Vemulapalli	May 28, 2000	Socorro	LINEAR	KOR	4.4 km	MPC · JPL
32088 Liamwallace	2000 KE_{25}	Liamwallace	May 28, 2000	Socorro	LINEAR	·	3.3 km	MPC · JPL
32089 Wojtania	2000 KO_{28}	Wojtania	May 28, 2000	Socorro	LINEAR	MAS	2.0 km	MPC · JPL
32090 Craigworley	2000 KC_{29}	Craigworley	May 28, 2000	Socorro	LINEAR	·	3.8 km	MPC · JPL
32091 Jasonwu	2000 KE_{30}	Jasonwu	May 28, 2000	Socorro	LINEAR	·	2.1 km	MPC · JPL
32092 Brianxia	2000 KG_{31}	Brianxia	May 28, 2000	Socorro	LINEAR	·	3.5 km	MPC · JPL
32093 Zhengyan	2000 KQ_{31}	Zhengyan	May 28, 2000	Socorro	LINEAR	·	3.4 km	MPC · JPL
32094	2000 KX_{32}	—	May 28, 2000	Socorro	LINEAR	·	6.1 km	MPC · JPL
32095	2000 KG_{38}	—	May 24, 2000	Kitt Peak	Spacewatch	·	5.8 km	MPC · JPL
32096 Puckett	2000 KO_{38}	Puckett	May 27, 2000	Anza	M. Collins, White, M.	·	2.9 km	MPC · JPL
32097	2000 KN_{39}	—	May 24, 2000	Kitt Peak	Spacewatch	·	2.6 km	MPC · JPL
32098	2000 KB_{43}	—	May 25, 2000	Kitt Peak	Spacewatch	·	1.8 km	MPC · JPL
32099	2000 KA_{48}	—	May 28, 2000	Socorro	LINEAR	EUN · slow	4.0 km	MPC · JPL
32100	2000 KU_{48}	—	May 28, 2000	Kitt Peak	Spacewatch	fast	3.4 km	MPC · JPL

== 32101–32200 ==
back to top

Designation			Discovery			Properties		Ref
Permanent	Provisional	Named after	Date	Site	Discoverer(s)	Category	Diam.	Ref
32101 Williamyin	2000 KA_{51}	Williamyin	May 29, 2000	Socorro	LINEAR	·	3.0 km	MPC · JPL
32102 Gavinmoriarty	2000 KB_{52}	Gavinmoriarty	May 23, 2000	Anderson Mesa	LONEOS	·	2.7 km	MPC · JPL
32103 Reʼemsari	2000 KF_{52}	Reʼemsari	May 23, 2000	Anderson Mesa	LONEOS	·	7.4 km	MPC · JPL
32104 Emmarainey	2000 KR_{52}	Emmarainey	May 24, 2000	Anderson Mesa	LONEOS	·	3.3 km	MPC · JPL
32105 Plesko	2000 KT_{52}	Plesko	May 24, 2000	Anderson Mesa	LONEOS	·	2.8 km	MPC · JPL
32106 Dawngraninger	2000 KD_{58}	Dawngraninger	May 24, 2000	Anderson Mesa	LONEOS	·	2.2 km	MPC · JPL
32107 Ylitalo	2000 KX_{64}	Ylitalo	May 27, 2000	Socorro	LINEAR	·	1.8 km	MPC · JPL
32108 Jovanzhang	2000 KZ_{64}	Jovanzhang	May 27, 2000	Socorro	LINEAR	V	2.3 km	MPC · JPL
32109 Brucksyal	2000 KQ_{70}	Brucksyal	May 28, 2000	Anderson Mesa	LONEOS	·	4.7 km	MPC · JPL
32110 Wendycaldwell	2000 KA_{73}	Wendycaldwell	May 28, 2000	Anderson Mesa	LONEOS	EUN	5.1 km	MPC · JPL
32111 Mallorydecoster	2000 KD_{73}	Mallorydecoster	May 28, 2000	Anderson Mesa	LONEOS	·	5.9 km	MPC · JPL
32112 Katiekumamoto	2000 KK_{73}	Katiekumamoto	May 28, 2000	Anderson Mesa	LONEOS	·	7.2 km	MPC · JPL
32113 Mikeowen	2000 KP_{73}	Mikeowen	May 28, 2000	Anderson Mesa	LONEOS	EOS	5.8 km	MPC · JPL
32114	2000 KY_{75}	—	May 27, 2000	Socorro	LINEAR	EUN	4.8 km	MPC · JPL
32115	2000 KQ_{80}	—	May 27, 2000	Socorro	LINEAR	·	1.9 km	MPC · JPL
32116	2000 LD_{4}	—	June 4, 2000	Socorro	LINEAR	·	6.2 km	MPC · JPL
32117	2000 LD_{5}	—	June 5, 2000	Socorro	LINEAR	DOR	7.3 km	MPC · JPL
32118	2000 LW_{5}	—	June 6, 2000	Reedy Creek	J. Broughton	·	3.2 km	MPC · JPL
32119	2000 LM_{7}	—	June 6, 2000	Kitt Peak	Spacewatch	EOS	6.3 km	MPC · JPL
32120 Stevezheng	2000 LC_{8}	Stevezheng	June 6, 2000	Socorro	LINEAR	NYS	2.8 km	MPC · JPL
32121 Joshuazhou	2000 LF_{9}	Joshuazhou	June 5, 2000	Socorro	LINEAR	·	3.3 km	MPC · JPL
32122	2000 LD_{10}	—	June 7, 2000	Socorro	LINEAR	·	5.1 km	MPC · JPL
32123	2000 LO_{10}	—	June 1, 2000	Socorro	LINEAR	·	13 km	MPC · JPL
32124	2000 LH_{11}	—	June 4, 2000	Socorro	LINEAR	HNS	3.6 km	MPC · JPL
32125	2000 LZ_{11}	—	June 4, 2000	Socorro	LINEAR	·	17 km	MPC · JPL
32126	2000 LF_{12}	—	June 4, 2000	Socorro	LINEAR	PHO ·	6.1 km	MPC · JPL
32127	2000 LK_{12}	—	June 4, 2000	Socorro	LINEAR	·	6.0 km	MPC · JPL
32128 Jayzussman	2000 LL_{13}	Jayzussman	June 5, 2000	Socorro	LINEAR	·	3.4 km	MPC · JPL
32129	2000 LV_{14}	—	June 7, 2000	Socorro	LINEAR	·	4.6 km	MPC · JPL
32130	2000 LN_{16}	—	June 1, 2000	Socorro	LINEAR	·	6.3 km	MPC · JPL
32131 Ravindran	2000 LQ_{16}	Ravindran	June 4, 2000	Socorro	LINEAR	V	1.8 km	MPC · JPL
32132 Andrewamini	2000 LS_{16}	Andrewamini	June 4, 2000	Socorro	LINEAR	·	2.8 km	MPC · JPL
32133	2000 LU_{16}	—	June 4, 2000	Socorro	LINEAR	EUN	3.8 km	MPC · JPL
32134	2000 LQ_{17}	—	June 7, 2000	Socorro	LINEAR	·	4.5 km	MPC · JPL
32135	2000 LF_{18}	—	June 8, 2000	Socorro	LINEAR	·	13 km	MPC · JPL
32136	2000 LN_{18}	—	June 8, 2000	Socorro	LINEAR	·	8.8 km	MPC · JPL
32137	2000 LM_{19}	—	June 8, 2000	Socorro	LINEAR	·	9.9 km	MPC · JPL
32138	2000 LQ_{19}	—	June 8, 2000	Socorro	LINEAR	·	5.7 km	MPC · JPL
32139	2000 LT_{19}	—	June 8, 2000	Socorro	LINEAR	EUN	4.8 km	MPC · JPL
32140	2000 LF_{21}	—	June 8, 2000	Socorro	LINEAR	·	7.6 km	MPC · JPL
32141	2000 LB_{24}	—	June 1, 2000	Socorro	LINEAR	HNS	3.6 km	MPC · JPL
32142 Tristanguillot	2000 LU_{26}	Tristanguillot	June 3, 2000	Anderson Mesa	LONEOS	·	6.4 km	MPC · JPL
32143	2000 LA_{27}	—	June 11, 2000	Valinhos	P. R. Holvorcem	PHO	5.1 km	MPC · JPL
32144 Humes	2000 LA_{29}	Humes	June 9, 2000	Anderson Mesa	LONEOS	DOR	7.7 km	MPC · JPL
32145 Katberman	2000 LE_{30}	Katberman	June 7, 2000	Socorro	LINEAR	·	4.4 km	MPC · JPL
32146 Paigebrown	2000 LF_{30}	Paigebrown	June 7, 2000	Socorro	LINEAR	·	4.0 km	MPC · JPL
32147	2000 LW_{30}	—	June 6, 2000	Anderson Mesa	LONEOS	·	3.7 km	MPC · JPL
32148	2000 LX_{30}	—	June 6, 2000	Anderson Mesa	LONEOS	NYS	3.1 km	MPC · JPL
32149	2000 LY_{30}	—	June 6, 2000	Anderson Mesa	LONEOS	·	3.6 km	MPC · JPL
32150 Crumpton	2000 LJ_{31}	Crumpton	June 6, 2000	Anderson Mesa	LONEOS	slow	9.9 km	MPC · JPL
32151 Seanmarshall	2000 LX_{31}	Seanmarshall	June 5, 2000	Anderson Mesa	LONEOS	NYS	2.3 km	MPC · JPL
32152 Hyland	2000 LK_{34}	Hyland	June 3, 2000	Anderson Mesa	LONEOS	·	8.2 km	MPC · JPL
32153 Laurenmcgraw	2000 LM_{34}	Laurenmcgraw	June 3, 2000	Anderson Mesa	LONEOS	·	11 km	MPC · JPL
32154	2000 MH	—	June 23, 2000	Reedy Creek	J. Broughton	PHO	4.3 km	MPC · JPL
32155	2000 MN	—	June 22, 2000	Kitt Peak	Spacewatch	·	2.6 km	MPC · JPL
32156	2000 MY	—	June 24, 2000	Reedy Creek	J. Broughton	·	2.5 km	MPC · JPL
32157	2000 MR_{1}	—	June 26, 2000	Reedy Creek	J. Broughton	·	4.2 km	MPC · JPL
32158	2000 MD_{2}	—	June 29, 2000	Reedy Creek	J. Broughton	·	4.5 km	MPC · JPL
32159	2000 MR_{2}	—	June 25, 2000	Haleakala	NEAT	THM	8.1 km	MPC · JPL
32160	2000 MT_{2}	—	June 27, 2000	Bergisch Gladbach	W. Bickel	(6769)	3.6 km	MPC · JPL
32161	2000 MR_{3}	—	June 24, 2000	Socorro	LINEAR	GEF	4.1 km	MPC · JPL
32162	2000 MV_{5}	—	June 25, 2000	Socorro	LINEAR	·	15 km	MPC · JPL
32163 Claireburch	2000 MZ_{5}	Claireburch	June 24, 2000	Socorro	LINEAR	·	3.9 km	MPC · JPL
32164	2000 NW_{4}	—	July 7, 2000	Socorro	LINEAR	EUN	5.5 km	MPC · JPL
32165	2000 NY_{5}	—	July 9, 2000	Farpoint	G. Hug	·	6.2 km	MPC · JPL
32166	2000 NN_{6}	—	July 3, 2000	Kitt Peak	Spacewatch	·	4.3 km	MPC · JPL
32167	2000 NU_{8}	—	July 5, 2000	Kitt Peak	Spacewatch	·	3.4 km	MPC · JPL
32168	2000 NP_{9}	—	July 10, 2000	Valinhos	P. R. Holvorcem	V	2.9 km	MPC · JPL
32169	2000 NT_{9}	—	July 6, 2000	Socorro	LINEAR	·	6.0 km	MPC · JPL
32170	2000 NU_{9}	—	July 6, 2000	Socorro	LINEAR	·	5.6 km	MPC · JPL
32171	2000 ND_{10}	—	July 1, 2000	Siding Spring	R. H. McNaught	PHO	3.0 km	MPC · JPL
32172	2000 NB_{11}	—	July 10, 2000	Valinhos	P. R. Holvorcem	·	7.7 km	MPC · JPL
32173	2000 NF_{12}	—	July 5, 2000	Anderson Mesa	LONEOS	·	11 km	MPC · JPL
32174	2000 NW_{12}	—	July 5, 2000	Anderson Mesa	LONEOS	·	4.7 km	MPC · JPL
32175	2000 NF_{14}	—	July 5, 2000	Anderson Mesa	LONEOS	·	7.8 km	MPC · JPL
32176	2000 NS_{14}	—	July 5, 2000	Anderson Mesa	LONEOS	·	3.7 km	MPC · JPL
32177	2000 NZ_{14}	—	July 5, 2000	Anderson Mesa	LONEOS	·	11 km	MPC · JPL
32178	2000 ND_{15}	—	July 5, 2000	Anderson Mesa	LONEOS	·	2.9 km	MPC · JPL
32179	2000 NC_{16}	—	July 5, 2000	Anderson Mesa	LONEOS	KOR	3.6 km	MPC · JPL
32180	2000 NY_{16}	—	July 5, 2000	Anderson Mesa	LONEOS	·	3.4 km	MPC · JPL
32181	2000 NB_{17}	—	July 5, 2000	Anderson Mesa	LONEOS	·	5.0 km	MPC · JPL
32182	2000 NR_{18}	—	July 5, 2000	Anderson Mesa	LONEOS	MIS	9.4 km	MPC · JPL
32183	2000 ND_{19}	—	July 5, 2000	Anderson Mesa	LONEOS	(17392)	4.3 km	MPC · JPL
32184 Yamaura	2000 NC_{20}	Yamaura	July 8, 2000	Bisei SG Center	BATTeRS	EUN	3.6 km	MPC · JPL
32185 Noonan	2000 ND_{23}	Noonan	July 5, 2000	Anderson Mesa	LONEOS	CYB	9.6 km	MPC · JPL
32186 McMullan	2000 NM_{23}	McMullan	July 5, 2000	Anderson Mesa	LONEOS	MAR	4.2 km	MPC · JPL
32187	2000 NR_{23}	—	July 5, 2000	Kitt Peak	Spacewatch	·	6.1 km	MPC · JPL
32188	2000 NR_{25}	—	July 4, 2000	Anderson Mesa	LONEOS	·	12 km	MPC · JPL
32189	2000 NT_{25}	—	July 4, 2000	Anderson Mesa	LONEOS	·	4.8 km	MPC · JPL
32190	2000 NM_{26}	—	July 4, 2000	Anderson Mesa	LONEOS	EMA	9.4 km	MPC · JPL
32191 Bensharkey	2000 NZ_{26}	Bensharkey	July 4, 2000	Anderson Mesa	LONEOS	·	9.4 km	MPC · JPL
32192	2000 NH_{27}	—	July 4, 2000	Anderson Mesa	LONEOS	·	6.8 km	MPC · JPL
32193	2000 NK_{27}	—	July 4, 2000	Anderson Mesa	LONEOS	·	3.1 km	MPC · JPL
32194 Mahlke	2000 NY_{27}	Mahlke	July 4, 2000	Anderson Mesa	LONEOS	EOS	5.0 km	MPC · JPL
32195	2000 NT_{28}	—	July 2, 2000	Kitt Peak	Spacewatch	·	9.9 km	MPC · JPL
32196	2000 OK	—	July 19, 2000	Farpoint	G. Hug	ERI	4.5 km	MPC · JPL
32197 Judylynnpalmer	2000 OV	Judylynnpalmer	July 24, 2000	Reedy Creek	J. Broughton	·	7.6 km	MPC · JPL
32198	2000 OK_{1}	—	July 24, 2000	Kitt Peak	Spacewatch	VER	7.7 km	MPC · JPL
32199	2000 ON_{2}	—	July 27, 2000	Črni Vrh	Mikuž, H.	·	2.9 km	MPC · JPL
32200 Seiicyoshida	2000 OT_{2}	Seiicyoshida	July 28, 2000	Dynic	Ikari, Y.	·	12 km	MPC · JPL

== 32201–32300 ==
back to top

Designation			Discovery			Properties		Ref
Permanent	Provisional	Named after	Date	Site	Discoverer(s)	Category	Diam.	Ref
32201 Heathermckay	2000 OZ_{2}	Heathermckay	July 29, 2000	Reedy Creek	J. Broughton	KOR	3.7 km	MPC · JPL
32202 Cogswell	2000 OA_{3}	Cogswell	July 29, 2000	Reedy Creek	J. Broughton	PAD	8.6 km	MPC · JPL
32203	2000 OF_{3}	—	July 23, 2000	Socorro	LINEAR	EUN	5.8 km	MPC · JPL
32204	2000 OL_{5}	—	July 24, 2000	Socorro	LINEAR	·	6.2 km	MPC · JPL
32205	2000 OS_{5}	—	July 24, 2000	Socorro	LINEAR	·	13 km	MPC · JPL
32206	2000 OM_{6}	—	July 29, 2000	Socorro	LINEAR	·	5.5 km	MPC · JPL
32207 Mairepercy	2000 OQ_{7}	Mairepercy	July 28, 2000	OCA-Anza	M. Collins, Gahran, M.	·	5.5 km	MPC · JPL
32208 Johnpercy	2000 OR_{7}	Johnpercy	July 28, 2000	OCA-Anza	M. Collins, Gahran, M.	PAD	6.8 km	MPC · JPL
32209	2000 OW_{9}	—	July 23, 2000	Socorro	LINEAR	·	10 km	MPC · JPL
32210	2000 OD_{10}	—	July 23, 2000	Socorro	LINEAR	·	3.5 km	MPC · JPL
32211	2000 OZ_{10}	—	July 23, 2000	Socorro	LINEAR	·	4.7 km	MPC · JPL
32212	2000 OV_{11}	—	July 23, 2000	Socorro	LINEAR	·	4.4 km	MPC · JPL
32213 Joshuachoe	2000 OE_{13}	Joshuachoe	July 23, 2000	Socorro	LINEAR	KOR	3.5 km	MPC · JPL
32214 Colburn	2000 OV_{15}	Colburn	July 23, 2000	Socorro	LINEAR	·	4.4 km	MPC · JPL
32215	2000 OG_{16}	—	July 23, 2000	Socorro	LINEAR	THM	8.8 km	MPC · JPL
32216	2000 OY_{17}	—	July 23, 2000	Socorro	LINEAR	EOS	7.8 km	MPC · JPL
32217 Beverlyge	2000 OE_{18}	Beverlyge	July 23, 2000	Socorro	LINEAR	·	5.4 km	MPC · JPL
32218	2000 OE_{19}	—	July 23, 2000	Socorro	LINEAR	MAR	5.3 km	MPC · JPL
32219	2000 OU_{20}	—	July 31, 2000	Socorro	LINEAR	·	7.1 km	MPC · JPL
32220	2000 OL_{21}	—	July 23, 2000	Socorro	LINEAR	·	6.4 km	MPC · JPL
32221	2000 OY_{22}	—	July 23, 2000	Socorro	LINEAR	MAR	5.7 km	MPC · JPL
32222 Charlesvest	2000 OD_{23}	Charlesvest	July 23, 2000	Socorro	LINEAR	·	10 km	MPC · JPL
32223	2000 OE_{23}	—	July 23, 2000	Socorro	LINEAR	·	3.7 km	MPC · JPL
32224	2000 OK_{23}	—	July 23, 2000	Socorro	LINEAR	·	6.3 km	MPC · JPL
32225	2000 OL_{23}	—	July 23, 2000	Socorro	LINEAR	THM	7.9 km	MPC · JPL
32226 Vikulgupta	2000 OQ_{23}	Vikulgupta	July 23, 2000	Socorro	LINEAR	·	3.8 km	MPC · JPL
32227	2000 OM_{25}	—	July 23, 2000	Socorro	LINEAR	·	5.0 km	MPC · JPL
32228	2000 OH_{26}	—	July 23, 2000	Socorro	LINEAR	·	4.8 km	MPC · JPL
32229 Higashino	2000 OX_{26}	Higashino	July 23, 2000	Socorro	LINEAR	·	3.5 km	MPC · JPL
32230	2000 OP_{27}	—	July 23, 2000	Socorro	LINEAR	·	12 km	MPC · JPL
32231	2000 OT_{27}	—	July 23, 2000	Socorro	LINEAR	·	11 km	MPC · JPL
32232	2000 OU_{27}	—	July 23, 2000	Socorro	LINEAR	V	4.7 km	MPC · JPL
32233 Georgehou	2000 OZ_{29}	Georgehou	July 30, 2000	Socorro	LINEAR	EOS	5.1 km	MPC · JPL
32234 Jesslihuang	2000 OW_{31}	Jesslihuang	July 30, 2000	Socorro	LINEAR	·	2.7 km	MPC · JPL
32235	2000 OJ_{32}	—	July 30, 2000	Socorro	LINEAR	·	7.6 km	MPC · JPL
32236	2000 OE_{35}	—	July 30, 2000	Socorro	LINEAR	EOS	5.3 km	MPC · JPL
32237 Jagadeesan	2000 OA_{37}	Jagadeesan	July 30, 2000	Socorro	LINEAR	EOS	4.9 km	MPC · JPL
32238	2000 ON_{37}	—	July 30, 2000	Socorro	LINEAR	·	9.1 km	MPC · JPL
32239	2000 OB_{39}	—	July 30, 2000	Socorro	LINEAR	·	7.6 km	MPC · JPL
32240	2000 OK_{39}	—	July 30, 2000	Socorro	LINEAR	(1101)	19 km	MPC · JPL
32241	2000 ON_{39}	—	July 30, 2000	Socorro	LINEAR	·	4.3 km	MPC · JPL
32242 Jagota	2000 OE_{40}	Jagota	July 30, 2000	Socorro	LINEAR	·	2.4 km	MPC · JPL
32243	2000 OU_{40}	—	July 30, 2000	Socorro	LINEAR	EOS	7.4 km	MPC · JPL
32244	2000 OK_{43}	—	July 30, 2000	Socorro	LINEAR	URS	15 km	MPC · JPL
32245	2000 OM_{43}	—	July 30, 2000	Socorro	LINEAR	EOS	7.5 km	MPC · JPL
32246	2000 OQ_{43}	—	July 30, 2000	Socorro	LINEAR	·	8.6 km	MPC · JPL
32247	2000 OS_{43}	—	July 30, 2000	Socorro	LINEAR	MRX	4.5 km	MPC · JPL
32248	2000 OV_{44}	—	July 30, 2000	Socorro	LINEAR	EUN	7.5 km	MPC · JPL
32249	2000 OM_{45}	—	July 30, 2000	Socorro	LINEAR	EOS	7.5 km	MPC · JPL
32250 Karthik	2000 OF_{46}	Karthik	July 30, 2000	Socorro	LINEAR	EOS	6.2 km	MPC · JPL
32251	2000 OH_{50}	—	July 31, 2000	Socorro	LINEAR	·	7.8 km	MPC · JPL
32252	2000 OJ_{51}	—	July 30, 2000	Socorro	LINEAR	MAR	5.6 km	MPC · JPL
32253	2000 OP_{51}	—	July 30, 2000	Socorro	LINEAR	(3025)	26 km	MPC · JPL
32254	2000 OR_{51}	—	July 30, 2000	Socorro	LINEAR	·	17 km	MPC · JPL
32255	2000 OT_{51}	—	July 30, 2000	Socorro	LINEAR	·	5.6 km	MPC · JPL
32256	2000 OL_{52}	—	July 30, 2000	Socorro	LINEAR	MAR	4.8 km	MPC · JPL
32257	2000 OW_{52}	—	July 31, 2000	Socorro	LINEAR	EOS	8.7 km	MPC · JPL
32258	2000 OF_{53}	—	July 30, 2000	Socorro	LINEAR	·	6.2 km	MPC · JPL
32259	2000 OT_{53}	—	July 30, 2000	Socorro	LINEAR	·	13 km	MPC · JPL
32260 Schult	2000 OG_{57}	Schult	July 29, 2000	Anderson Mesa	LONEOS	EOS	5.6 km	MPC · JPL
32261 Podlewskagaca	2000 OS_{58}	Podlewskagaca	July 29, 2000	Anderson Mesa	LONEOS	·	4.9 km	MPC · JPL
32262 Marinferrais	2000 OA_{60}	Marinferrais	July 29, 2000	Anderson Mesa	LONEOS	·	3.1 km	MPC · JPL
32263 Kusnierkiewicz	2000 OH_{69}	Kusnierkiewicz	July 31, 2000	Cerro Tololo	M. W. Buie	·	3.9 km	MPC · JPL
32264 Cathjesslai	2000 PC_{1}	Cathjesslai	August 1, 2000	Socorro	LINEAR	(5)	2.5 km	MPC · JPL
32265	2000 PJ_{1}	—	August 1, 2000	Socorro	LINEAR	DOR	12 km	MPC · JPL
32266	2000 PN_{1}	—	August 1, 2000	Socorro	LINEAR	EOS	6.6 km	MPC · JPL
32267 Hermannweyl	2000 PS_{1}	Hermannweyl	August 1, 2000	Prescott	P. G. Comba	·	3.9 km	MPC · JPL
32268	2000 PX_{1}	—	August 1, 2000	Socorro	LINEAR	VER	7.6 km	MPC · JPL
32269	2000 PB_{2}	—	August 1, 2000	Socorro	LINEAR	·	4.8 km	MPC · JPL
32270 Inokuchihiroo	2000 PC_{4}	Inokuchihiroo	August 4, 2000	Bisei SG Center	BATTeRS	·	6.4 km	MPC · JPL
32271	2000 PH_{4}	—	August 1, 2000	Socorro	LINEAR	EOS	4.7 km	MPC · JPL
32272 Hasegawayuya	2000 PV_{4}	Hasegawayuya	August 4, 2000	Bisei SG Center	BATTeRS	V	2.4 km	MPC · JPL
32273	2000 PC_{6}	—	August 5, 2000	Haleakala	NEAT	EOS	4.5 km	MPC · JPL
32274	2000 PU_{10}	—	August 1, 2000	Socorro	LINEAR	EOS	6.6 km	MPC · JPL
32275 Limichael	2000 PS_{13}	Limichael	August 1, 2000	Socorro	LINEAR	·	2.9 km	MPC · JPL
32276 Allenliu	2000 PV_{14}	Allenliu	August 1, 2000	Socorro	LINEAR	V	2.0 km	MPC · JPL
32277 Helenliu	2000 PE_{15}	Helenliu	August 1, 2000	Socorro	LINEAR	·	5.1 km	MPC · JPL
32278 Makaram	2000 PU_{15}	Makaram	August 1, 2000	Socorro	LINEAR	·	5.8 km	MPC · JPL
32279 Marshall	2000 PX_{16}	Marshall	August 1, 2000	Socorro	LINEAR	·	4.7 km	MPC · JPL
32280 Rachelmashal	2000 PF_{17}	Rachelmashal	August 1, 2000	Socorro	LINEAR	KOR	3.9 km	MPC · JPL
32281 Shreyamenon	2000 PP_{21}	Shreyamenon	August 1, 2000	Socorro	LINEAR	·	4.6 km	MPC · JPL
32282 Arnoldmong	2000 PS_{23}	Arnoldmong	August 2, 2000	Socorro	LINEAR	THM	7.9 km	MPC · JPL
32283	2000 PD_{24}	—	August 2, 2000	Socorro	LINEAR	·	8.0 km	MPC · JPL
32284	2000 PH_{24}	—	August 2, 2000	Socorro	LINEAR	KOR	4.8 km	MPC · JPL
32285	2000 PR_{24}	—	August 3, 2000	Socorro	LINEAR	MAR	4.3 km	MPC · JPL
32286	2000 PS_{24}	—	August 3, 2000	Socorro	LINEAR	·	11 km	MPC · JPL
32287	2000 PF_{26}	—	August 5, 2000	Haleakala	NEAT	·	5.4 km	MPC · JPL
32288 Terui	2000 QN_{1}	Terui	August 23, 2000	Bisei SG Center	BATTeRS	·	6.5 km	MPC · JPL
32289	2000 QR_{4}	—	August 24, 2000	Socorro	LINEAR	EOS	6.3 km	MPC · JPL
32290	2000 QH_{5}	—	August 24, 2000	Socorro	LINEAR	PHO	6.9 km	MPC · JPL
32291	2000 QP_{8}	—	August 24, 2000	Črni Vrh	Skvarč, J.	EUN	4.7 km	MPC · JPL
32292	2000 QR_{8}	—	August 24, 2000	Črni Vrh	Skvarč, J.	·	3.6 km	MPC · JPL
32293	2000 QT_{8}	—	August 24, 2000	Črni Vrh	Skvarč, J.	EOS	5.0 km	MPC · JPL
32294 Zajonc	2000 QN_{9}	Zajonc	August 26, 2000	Ondřejov	P. Kušnirák, P. Pravec	EUN	4.1 km	MPC · JPL
32295 Ravichandran	2000 QD_{10}	Ravichandran	August 24, 2000	Socorro	LINEAR	·	3.4 km	MPC · JPL
32296 Aninsayana	2000 QY_{10}	Aninsayana	August 24, 2000	Socorro	LINEAR	·	7.1 km	MPC · JPL
32297	2000 QN_{11}	—	August 24, 2000	Socorro	LINEAR	·	3.2 km	MPC · JPL
32298 Kunalshroff	2000 QD_{12}	Kunalshroff	August 24, 2000	Socorro	LINEAR	KOR	4.3 km	MPC · JPL
32299 Srinivas	2000 QD_{17}	Srinivas	August 24, 2000	Socorro	LINEAR	·	5.9 km	MPC · JPL
32300 Uwamanzunna	2000 QL_{20}	Uwamanzunna	August 24, 2000	Socorro	LINEAR	·	6.0 km	MPC · JPL

== 32301–32400 ==
back to top

Designation			Discovery			Properties		Ref
Permanent	Provisional	Named after	Date	Site	Discoverer(s)	Category	Diam.	Ref
32301	2000 QN_{23}	—	August 25, 2000	Socorro	LINEAR	·	6.8 km	MPC · JPL
32302 Mayavarma	2000 QO_{24}	Mayavarma	August 25, 2000	Socorro	LINEAR	·	2.1 km	MPC · JPL
32303	2000 QT_{24}	—	August 25, 2000	Socorro	LINEAR	·	14 km	MPC · JPL
32304	2000 QC_{25}	—	August 25, 2000	Farpoint	Farpoint	MAR	4.0 km	MPC · JPL
32305	2000 QD_{28}	—	August 24, 2000	Socorro	LINEAR	·	9.8 km	MPC · JPL
32306	2000 QT_{28}	—	August 24, 2000	Socorro	LINEAR	KOR	4.9 km	MPC · JPL
32307	2000 QG_{31}	—	August 26, 2000	Socorro	LINEAR	·	8.4 km	MPC · JPL
32308 Sreyavemuri	2000 QZ_{31}	Sreyavemuri	August 26, 2000	Socorro	LINEAR	·	4.0 km	MPC · JPL
32309	2000 QN_{32}	—	August 26, 2000	Socorro	LINEAR	MAR	4.8 km	MPC · JPL
32310 Asherwillner	2000 QY_{35}	Asherwillner	August 24, 2000	Socorro	LINEAR	(5)	3.4 km	MPC · JPL
32311 Josephineyu	2000 QA_{38}	Josephineyu	August 24, 2000	Socorro	LINEAR	·	3.5 km	MPC · JPL
32312	2000 QT_{38}	—	August 24, 2000	Socorro	LINEAR	·	5.6 km	MPC · JPL
32313 Zhangmichael	2000 QO_{39}	Zhangmichael	August 24, 2000	Socorro	LINEAR	·	7.6 km	MPC · JPL
32314 Rachelzhang	2000 QO_{42}	Rachelzhang	August 24, 2000	Socorro	LINEAR	KOR	3.9 km	MPC · JPL
32315 Clarezhu	2000 QO_{43}	Clarezhu	August 24, 2000	Socorro	LINEAR	KOR	3.4 km	MPC · JPL
32316	2000 QA_{44}	—	August 24, 2000	Socorro	LINEAR	·	5.2 km	MPC · JPL
32317	2000 QE_{44}	—	August 24, 2000	Socorro	LINEAR	·	4.6 km	MPC · JPL
32318	2000 QO_{47}	—	August 24, 2000	Socorro	LINEAR	KOR	3.1 km	MPC · JPL
32319	2000 QL_{49}	—	August 24, 2000	Socorro	LINEAR	·	3.2 km	MPC · JPL
32320	2000 QN_{51}	—	August 24, 2000	Socorro	LINEAR	EOS	5.2 km	MPC · JPL
32321	2000 QO_{53}	—	August 25, 2000	Socorro	LINEAR	·	4.0 km	MPC · JPL
32322	2000 QS_{57}	—	August 26, 2000	Socorro	LINEAR	·	3.2 km	MPC · JPL
32323	2000 QW_{60}	—	August 26, 2000	Socorro	LINEAR	KOR	3.7 km	MPC · JPL
32324	2000 QB_{61}	—	August 26, 2000	Socorro	LINEAR	EOS	5.6 km	MPC · JPL
32325	2000 QG_{62}	—	August 28, 2000	Socorro	LINEAR	·	11 km	MPC · JPL
32326	2000 QO_{62}	—	August 28, 2000	Socorro	LINEAR	JUN	4.6 km	MPC · JPL
32327	2000 QA_{63}	—	August 28, 2000	Socorro	LINEAR	·	6.7 km	MPC · JPL
32328	2000 QW_{63}	—	August 28, 2000	Socorro	LINEAR	·	4.1 km	MPC · JPL
32329	2000 QJ_{64}	—	August 28, 2000	Socorro	LINEAR	·	5.1 km	MPC · JPL
32330	2000 QK_{64}	—	August 28, 2000	Socorro	LINEAR	·	9.5 km	MPC · JPL
32331	2000 QK_{65}	—	August 28, 2000	Socorro	LINEAR	·	14 km	MPC · JPL
32332	2000 QV_{69}	—	August 30, 2000	Kitt Peak	Spacewatch	CYB	9.5 km	MPC · JPL
32333	2000 QQ_{71}	—	August 24, 2000	Socorro	LINEAR	·	8.5 km	MPC · JPL
32334	2000 QM_{77}	—	August 24, 2000	Socorro	LINEAR	THM	6.6 km	MPC · JPL
32335	2000 QO_{82}	—	August 24, 2000	Socorro	LINEAR	·	8.5 km	MPC · JPL
32336	2000 QB_{86}	—	August 25, 2000	Socorro	LINEAR	·	7.0 km	MPC · JPL
32337	2000 QM_{87}	—	August 25, 2000	Socorro	LINEAR	HYG	6.0 km	MPC · JPL
32338	2000 QS_{87}	—	August 25, 2000	Socorro	LINEAR	·	12 km	MPC · JPL
32339	2000 QA_{88}	—	August 25, 2000	Socorro	LINEAR	L5	28 km	MPC · JPL
32340	2000 QY_{88}	—	August 25, 2000	Socorro	LINEAR	·	6.0 km	MPC · JPL
32341	2000 QG_{89}	—	August 25, 2000	Socorro	LINEAR	·	1.8 km	MPC · JPL
32342	2000 QE_{90}	—	August 25, 2000	Socorro	LINEAR	·	3.2 km	MPC · JPL
32343	2000 QD_{92}	—	August 25, 2000	Socorro	LINEAR	GEF	4.9 km	MPC · JPL
32344	2000 QV_{94}	—	August 26, 2000	Socorro	LINEAR	·	6.5 km	MPC · JPL
32345	2000 QF_{99}	—	August 28, 2000	Socorro	LINEAR	CYB	9.6 km	MPC · JPL
32346	2000 QS_{99}	—	August 28, 2000	Socorro	LINEAR	·	4.8 km	MPC · JPL
32347	2000 QK_{101}	—	August 28, 2000	Socorro	LINEAR	EOS	6.0 km	MPC · JPL
32348	2000 QL_{103}	—	August 28, 2000	Socorro	LINEAR	·	10 km	MPC · JPL
32349	2000 QA_{109}	—	August 29, 2000	Socorro	LINEAR	·	4.1 km	MPC · JPL
32350	2000 QP_{115}	—	August 25, 2000	Socorro	LINEAR	EOS	5.6 km	MPC · JPL
32351	2000 QH_{116}	—	August 28, 2000	Socorro	LINEAR	·	8.3 km	MPC · JPL
32352	2000 QT_{116}	—	August 28, 2000	Socorro	LINEAR	·	4.2 km	MPC · JPL
32353	2000 QX_{118}	—	August 25, 2000	Socorro	LINEAR	·	10 km	MPC · JPL
32354	2000 QN_{119}	—	August 25, 2000	Socorro	LINEAR	·	9.0 km	MPC · JPL
32355	2000 QA_{122}	—	August 25, 2000	Socorro	LINEAR	EUN	6.0 km	MPC · JPL
32356	2000 QM_{124}	—	August 28, 2000	Socorro	LINEAR	L5	15 km	MPC · JPL
32357	2000 QR_{124}	—	August 29, 2000	Socorro	LINEAR	·	3.4 km	MPC · JPL
32358	2000 QS_{124}	—	August 29, 2000	Socorro	LINEAR	·	6.9 km	MPC · JPL
32359	2000 QZ_{128}	—	August 25, 2000	Socorro	LINEAR	·	4.4 km	MPC · JPL
32360	2000 QV_{133}	—	August 26, 2000	Socorro	LINEAR	THM	7.2 km	MPC · JPL
32361	2000 QF_{135}	—	August 26, 2000	Socorro	LINEAR	·	13 km	MPC · JPL
32362	2000 QS_{136}	—	August 29, 2000	Socorro	LINEAR	EOS	4.3 km	MPC · JPL
32363	2000 QX_{136}	—	August 29, 2000	Socorro	LINEAR	·	4.2 km	MPC · JPL
32364	2000 QS_{137}	—	August 31, 2000	Socorro	LINEAR	HYG	7.6 km	MPC · JPL
32365	2000 QV_{138}	—	August 31, 2000	Socorro	LINEAR	·	8.3 km	MPC · JPL
32366	2000 QA_{142}	—	August 31, 2000	Socorro	LINEAR	·	3.3 km	MPC · JPL
32367	2000 QL_{144}	—	August 31, 2000	Socorro	LINEAR	·	6.0 km	MPC · JPL
32368	2000 QS_{146}	—	August 31, 2000	Socorro	LINEAR	EOS	5.5 km	MPC · JPL
32369	2000 QQ_{149}	—	August 24, 2000	Socorro	LINEAR	·	8.4 km	MPC · JPL
32370	2000 QY_{151}	—	August 26, 2000	Socorro	LINEAR	L5	18 km	MPC · JPL
32371	2000 QM_{154}	—	August 31, 2000	Socorro	LINEAR	GEF	4.0 km	MPC · JPL
32372	2000 QL_{159}	—	August 31, 2000	Socorro	LINEAR	EOS	4.4 km	MPC · JPL
32373	2000 QZ_{168}	—	August 31, 2000	Socorro	LINEAR	·	8.8 km	MPC · JPL
32374	2000 QK_{169}	—	August 31, 2000	Socorro	LINEAR	·	9.7 km	MPC · JPL
32375	2000 QM_{169}	—	August 31, 2000	Socorro	LINEAR	EOS	4.7 km	MPC · JPL
32376	2000 QP_{169}	—	August 31, 2000	Socorro	LINEAR	MAR	5.4 km	MPC · JPL
32377	2000 QP_{170}	—	August 31, 2000	Socorro	LINEAR	·	8.2 km	MPC · JPL
32378	2000 QB_{173}	—	August 31, 2000	Socorro	LINEAR	·	3.6 km	MPC · JPL
32379 Markadame	2000 QR_{177}	Markadame	August 31, 2000	Socorro	LINEAR	MRX	2.5 km	MPC · JPL
32380	2000 QE_{184}	—	August 26, 2000	Socorro	LINEAR	EOS	6.1 km	MPC · JPL
32381 Bellomo	2000 QP_{185}	Bellomo	August 26, 2000	Socorro	LINEAR	·	7.1 km	MPC · JPL
32382	2000 QE_{187}	—	August 26, 2000	Socorro	LINEAR	·	5.6 km	MPC · JPL
32383	2000 QG_{188}	—	August 26, 2000	Socorro	LINEAR	·	4.9 km	MPC · JPL
32384 Scottbest	2000 QQ_{190}	Scottbest	August 26, 2000	Socorro	LINEAR	·	8.0 km	MPC · JPL
32385	2000 QU_{191}	—	August 26, 2000	Socorro	LINEAR	·	7.1 km	MPC · JPL
32386	2000 QB_{192}	—	August 26, 2000	Socorro	LINEAR	·	9.4 km	MPC · JPL
32387 D'Egidio	2000 QR_{193}	D'Egidio	August 29, 2000	Socorro	LINEAR	slow	7.1 km	MPC · JPL
32388	2000 QU_{201}	—	August 29, 2000	Socorro	LINEAR	EOS	5.7 km	MPC · JPL
32389 Michflannory	2000 QJ_{202}	Michflannory	August 29, 2000	Socorro	LINEAR	THM	6.8 km	MPC · JPL
32390	2000 QA_{203}	—	August 29, 2000	Socorro	LINEAR	·	5.7 km	MPC · JPL
32391	2000 QO_{203}	—	August 29, 2000	Socorro	LINEAR	HYG	8.2 km	MPC · JPL
32392	2000 QF_{207}	—	August 31, 2000	Socorro	LINEAR	EOS	7.5 km	MPC · JPL
32393 Galinato	2000 QT_{209}	Galinato	August 31, 2000	Socorro	LINEAR	·	6.6 km	MPC · JPL
32394	2000 QL_{210}	—	August 31, 2000	Socorro	LINEAR	SYL · CYB	11 km	MPC · JPL
32395	2000 QV_{213}	—	August 31, 2000	Socorro	LINEAR	3:2	18 km	MPC · JPL
32396	2000 QY_{213}	—	August 31, 2000	Socorro	LINEAR	L5	20 km	MPC · JPL
32397	2000 QL_{214}	—	August 31, 2000	Socorro	LINEAR	L5	31 km	MPC · JPL
32398 Métayer	2000 QT_{218}	Métayer	August 20, 2000	Anderson Mesa	LONEOS	·	7.5 km	MPC · JPL
32399 Epifani	2000 QA_{219}	Epifani	August 20, 2000	Anderson Mesa	LONEOS	KOR	3.8 km	MPC · JPL
32400 Itaparica	2000 QK_{220}	Itaparica	August 21, 2000	Anderson Mesa	LONEOS	EOS ·	7.0 km	MPC · JPL

== 32401–32500 ==
back to top

Designation			Discovery			Properties		Ref
Permanent	Provisional	Named after	Date	Site	Discoverer(s)	Category	Diam.	Ref
32401	2000 QO_{226}	—	August 31, 2000	Kitt Peak	Spacewatch	EOS	5.6 km	MPC · JPL
32402 Annametke	2000 QF_{231}	Annametke	August 20, 2000	Anderson Mesa	LONEOS	DOR	11 km	MPC · JPL
32403	2000 QK_{249}	—	August 28, 2000	Socorro	LINEAR	HYG	8.7 km	MPC · JPL
32404	2000 RN	—	September 1, 2000	Socorro	LINEAR	·	5.0 km	MPC · JPL
32405 Jameshill	2000 RD_{1}	Jameshill	September 1, 2000	Socorro	LINEAR	·	2.7 km	MPC · JPL
32406 Tracyhughes	2000 RE_{1}	Tracyhughes	September 1, 2000	Socorro	LINEAR	·	7.4 km	MPC · JPL
32407	2000 RT_{1}	—	September 1, 2000	Socorro	LINEAR	KOR	4.9 km	MPC · JPL
32408	2000 RU_{12}	—	September 1, 2000	Socorro	LINEAR	EOS	4.1 km	MPC · JPL
32409	2000 RR_{16}	—	September 1, 2000	Socorro	LINEAR	·	6.0 km	MPC · JPL
32410	2000 RH_{19}	—	September 1, 2000	Socorro	LINEAR	EOS	4.9 km	MPC · JPL
32411	2000 RY_{24}	—	September 1, 2000	Socorro	LINEAR	·	7.7 km	MPC · JPL
32412	2000 RW_{25}	—	September 1, 2000	Socorro	LINEAR	EOS ·	8.8 km	MPC · JPL
32413	2000 RR_{26}	—	September 1, 2000	Socorro	LINEAR	EOS · fast	6.9 km	MPC · JPL
32414	2000 RT_{29}	—	September 1, 2000	Socorro	LINEAR	EOS	7.4 km	MPC · JPL
32415	2000 RH_{30}	—	September 1, 2000	Socorro	LINEAR	EOS	4.8 km	MPC · JPL
32416	2000 RS_{31}	—	September 1, 2000	Socorro	LINEAR	VER	13 km	MPC · JPL
32417	2000 RK_{32}	—	September 1, 2000	Socorro	LINEAR	EOS	5.3 km	MPC · JPL
32418	2000 RD_{33}	—	September 1, 2000	Socorro	LINEAR	(32418)	7.9 km	MPC · JPL
32419	2000 RY_{33}	—	September 1, 2000	Socorro	LINEAR	RAF	5.5 km	MPC · JPL
32420	2000 RS_{40}	—	September 3, 2000	Socorro	LINEAR	L5	20 km	MPC · JPL
32421	2000 RB_{41}	—	September 3, 2000	Socorro	LINEAR	·	8.5 km	MPC · JPL
32422	2000 RO_{42}	—	September 3, 2000	Socorro	LINEAR	EOS	6.3 km	MPC · JPL
32423	2000 RO_{43}	—	September 3, 2000	Socorro	LINEAR	·	8.1 km	MPC · JPL
32424 Caryjames	2000 RY_{62}	Caryjames	September 2, 2000	Socorro	LINEAR	·	4.6 km	MPC · JPL
32425	2000 RL_{64}	—	September 1, 2000	Socorro	LINEAR	·	6.0 km	MPC · JPL
32426	2000 RP_{68}	—	September 2, 2000	Socorro	LINEAR	·	4.5 km	MPC · JPL
32427	2000 RU_{68}	—	September 2, 2000	Socorro	LINEAR	·	7.0 km	MPC · JPL
32428 Peterlangley	2000 RC_{75}	Peterlangley	September 3, 2000	Socorro	LINEAR	·	2.2 km	MPC · JPL
32429	2000 RP_{83}	—	September 1, 2000	Socorro	LINEAR	·	10 km	MPC · JPL
32430	2000 RQ_{83}	—	September 1, 2000	Socorro	LINEAR	L5	13 km	MPC · JPL
32431	2000 RC_{84}	—	September 2, 2000	Anderson Mesa	LONEOS	·	9.7 km	MPC · JPL
32432 Stansberry	2000 RT_{86}	Stansberry	September 2, 2000	Anderson Mesa	LONEOS	HYG	9.6 km	MPC · JPL
32433	2000 RF_{92}	—	September 3, 2000	Socorro	LINEAR	CYB	14 km	MPC · JPL
32434	2000 RW_{96}	—	September 5, 2000	Anderson Mesa	LONEOS	L5	21 km	MPC · JPL
32435	2000 RZ_{96}	—	September 5, 2000	Anderson Mesa	LONEOS	L5	31 km	MPC · JPL
32436 Eranofek	2000 RQ_{97}	Eranofek	September 5, 2000	Anderson Mesa	LONEOS	HNS	5.9 km	MPC · JPL
32437	2000 RR_{97}	—	September 5, 2000	Anderson Mesa	LONEOS	L5	29 km	MPC · JPL
32438 Wonyonghan	2000 RW_{98}	Wonyonghan	September 5, 2000	Anderson Mesa	LONEOS	·	11 km	MPC · JPL
32439 Sangjoonkim	2000 RO_{99}	Sangjoonkim	September 5, 2000	Anderson Mesa	LONEOS	·	7.4 km	MPC · JPL
32440	2000 RC_{100}	—	September 5, 2000	Anderson Mesa	LONEOS	L5	29 km	MPC · JPL
32441 Youngrokkim	2000 RO_{100}	Youngrokkim	September 5, 2000	Anderson Mesa	LONEOS	·	14 km	MPC · JPL
32442 Heejaelee	2000 RS_{100}	Heejaelee	September 5, 2000	Anderson Mesa	LONEOS	·	16 km	MPC · JPL
32443 Davidhaack	2000 RD_{101}	Davidhaack	September 5, 2000	Anderson Mesa	LONEOS	·	4.6 km	MPC · JPL
32444	2000 RL_{101}	—	September 5, 2000	Anderson Mesa	LONEOS	·	11 km	MPC · JPL
32445	2000 RC_{104}	—	September 6, 2000	Socorro	LINEAR	ADE	11 km	MPC · JPL
32446	2000 SY_{5}	—	September 20, 2000	Socorro	LINEAR	ADE ·	4.3 km	MPC · JPL
32447	2000 SG_{6}	—	September 20, 2000	Socorro	LINEAR	·	8.0 km	MPC · JPL
32448	2000 SD_{12}	—	September 20, 2000	Socorro	LINEAR	·	6.9 km	MPC · JPL
32449 Crystalmiller	2000 SR_{16}	Crystalmiller	September 23, 2000	Socorro	LINEAR	·	2.4 km	MPC · JPL
32450	2000 SH_{25}	—	September 23, 2000	Socorro	LINEAR	·	7.4 km	MPC · JPL
32451	2000 SP_{25}	—	September 23, 2000	Socorro	LINEAR	L5	27 km	MPC · JPL
32452	2000 SC_{39}	—	September 24, 2000	Socorro	LINEAR	·	8.3 km	MPC · JPL
32453 Kanamishogo	2000 SF_{42}	Kanamishogo	September 26, 2000	Fukuchiyama	Yoshimi, M.	EOS	7.5 km	MPC · JPL
32454	2000 SD_{50}	—	September 23, 2000	Socorro	LINEAR	HYG	6.7 km	MPC · JPL
32455	2000 SW_{60}	—	September 24, 2000	Socorro	LINEAR	HIL · 3:2 · (6124)	13 km	MPC · JPL
32456	2000 SH_{72}	—	September 24, 2000	Socorro	LINEAR	TIR	8.1 km	MPC · JPL
32457	2000 SZ_{85}	—	September 24, 2000	Socorro	LINEAR	·	5.4 km	MPC · JPL
32458	2000 SF_{87}	—	September 24, 2000	Socorro	LINEAR	PHO	3.8 km	MPC · JPL
32459	2000 SK_{87}	—	September 24, 2000	Socorro	LINEAR	·	9.2 km	MPC · JPL
32460	2000 SY_{92}	—	September 23, 2000	Socorro	LINEAR	T_{j} (2.94)	20 km	MPC · JPL
32461	2000 SP_{93}	—	September 23, 2000	Socorro	LINEAR	L5	20 km	MPC · JPL
32462 Janmitchener	2000 SU_{112}	Janmitchener	September 24, 2000	Socorro	LINEAR	THM	7.6 km	MPC · JPL
32463	2000 SO_{129}	—	September 22, 2000	Socorro	LINEAR	·	9.6 km	MPC · JPL
32464	2000 SB_{132}	—	September 22, 2000	Socorro	LINEAR	L5	30 km	MPC · JPL
32465	2000 SM_{141}	—	September 23, 2000	Socorro	LINEAR	EOS	5.7 km	MPC · JPL
32466	2000 SN_{153}	—	September 24, 2000	Socorro	LINEAR	·	6.0 km	MPC · JPL
32467	2000 SL_{174}	—	September 28, 2000	Socorro	LINEAR	L5	20 km	MPC · JPL
32468	2000 SS_{176}	—	September 28, 2000	Socorro	LINEAR	EUN · slow	4.9 km	MPC · JPL
32469	2000 SL_{188}	—	September 21, 2000	Haleakala	NEAT	·	9.3 km	MPC · JPL
32470	2000 SD_{190}	—	September 23, 2000	Kitt Peak	Spacewatch	slow	7.4 km	MPC · JPL
32471	2000 SK_{205}	—	September 24, 2000	Socorro	LINEAR	L5	15 km	MPC · JPL
32472	2000 SC_{210}	—	September 25, 2000	Socorro	LINEAR	EOS	5.7 km	MPC · JPL
32473	2000 SG_{210}	—	September 25, 2000	Socorro	LINEAR	·	4.9 km	MPC · JPL
32474	2000 SP_{212}	—	September 25, 2000	Socorro	LINEAR	·	13 km	MPC · JPL
32475	2000 SD_{234}	—	September 21, 2000	Socorro	LINEAR	L5	38 km	MPC · JPL
32476	2000 SP_{237}	—	September 25, 2000	Socorro	LINEAR	EOS	5.9 km	MPC · JPL
32477	2000 SV_{238}	—	September 26, 2000	Socorro	LINEAR	·	12 km	MPC · JPL
32478	2000 SV_{289}	—	September 27, 2000	Socorro	LINEAR	L5	21 km	MPC · JPL
32479	2000 SL_{312}	—	September 27, 2000	Socorro	LINEAR	EUN	7.1 km	MPC · JPL
32480	2000 SG_{348}	—	September 20, 2000	Socorro	LINEAR	L5	30 km	MPC · JPL
32481 Inasaridze	2000 SF_{352}	Inasaridze	September 30, 2000	Anderson Mesa	LONEOS	EOS	6.0 km	MPC · JPL
32482	2000 ST_{354}	—	September 29, 2000	Anderson Mesa	LONEOS	L5	28 km	MPC · JPL
32483 Kumar	2000 SM_{362}	Kumar	September 19, 2000	Anderson Mesa	LONEOS	·	8.2 km	MPC · JPL
32484	2000 TV_{29}	—	October 4, 2000	Socorro	LINEAR	·	13 km	MPC · JPL
32485	2000 TY_{44}	—	October 1, 2000	Socorro	LINEAR	·	9.5 km	MPC · JPL
32486 Leospohl	2000 TY_{56}	Leospohl	October 2, 2000	Anderson Mesa	LONEOS	EOS	8.6 km	MPC · JPL
32487 Eschrig	2000 TM_{61}	Eschrig	October 2, 2000	Anderson Mesa	LONEOS	EOS	5.4 km	MPC · JPL
32488	2000 TF_{64}	—	October 5, 2000	Socorro	LINEAR	EOS	6.0 km	MPC · JPL
32489	2000 UG_{17}	—	October 24, 2000	Socorro	LINEAR	·	5.9 km	MPC · JPL
32490	2000 UU_{27}	—	October 25, 2000	Socorro	LINEAR	·	7.8 km	MPC · JPL
32491	2000 UU_{107}	—	October 30, 2000	Socorro	LINEAR	EUN	5.4 km	MPC · JPL
32492	2000 VJ_{15}	—	November 1, 2000	Socorro	LINEAR	·	5.4 km	MPC · JPL
32493	2000 WR_{3}	—	November 18, 2000	Socorro	LINEAR	EUN	4.7 km	MPC · JPL
32494	2000 WY_{125}	—	November 30, 2000	Socorro	LINEAR	EOS	8.2 km	MPC · JPL
32495	2000 WT_{171}	—	November 25, 2000	Socorro	LINEAR	EUN	8.3 km	MPC · JPL
32496 Deïopites	2000 WX_{182}	Deïopites	November 18, 2000	Socorro	LINEAR	L5	48 km	MPC · JPL
32497	2000 XF_{18}	—	December 4, 2000	Socorro	LINEAR	EUN	6.9 km	MPC · JPL
32498	2000 XX_{37}	—	December 5, 2000	Socorro	LINEAR	L4	22 km	MPC · JPL
32499	2000 YS_{11}	—	December 19, 2000	Haleakala	NEAT	L5	39 km	MPC · JPL
32500	2000 YV_{76}	—	December 30, 2000	Socorro	LINEAR	·	4.1 km	MPC · JPL

== 32501–32600 ==
back to top

Designation			Discovery			Properties		Ref
Permanent	Provisional	Named after	Date	Site	Discoverer(s)	Category	Diam.	Ref
32501	2000 YV_{135}	—	December 22, 2000	Socorro	LINEAR	L5	36 km	MPC · JPL
32502	2001 BG_{77}	—	January 26, 2001	Socorro	LINEAR	·	6.9 km	MPC · JPL
32503	2001 FN_{57}	—	March 18, 2001	Socorro	LINEAR	MAR	6.7 km	MPC · JPL
32504	2001 HP_{8}	—	April 21, 2001	Socorro	LINEAR	H	1.8 km	MPC · JPL
32505	2001 KF_{17}	—	May 18, 2001	Socorro	LINEAR	MAR	6.0 km	MPC · JPL
32506	2001 KP_{30}	—	May 21, 2001	Socorro	LINEAR	PHO	2.7 km	MPC · JPL
32507	2001 LR_{15}	—	June 12, 2001	Palomar	NEAT	DOR	7.0 km	MPC · JPL
32508	2001 MR_{11}	—	June 19, 2001	Haleakala	NEAT	·	8.8 km	MPC · JPL
32509	2001 MW_{29}	—	June 28, 2001	Haleakala	NEAT	·	4.8 km	MPC · JPL
32510	2001 NS	—	July 12, 2001	Reedy Creek	J. Broughton	·	5.2 km	MPC · JPL
32511	2001 NX_{17}	—	July 9, 2001	Socorro	LINEAR	T_{j} (2.79)	17 km	MPC · JPL
32512	2001 OM_{14}	—	July 20, 2001	Socorro	LINEAR	·	6.7 km	MPC · JPL
32513	2001 OL_{31}	—	July 19, 2001	Palomar	NEAT	L5	30 km	MPC · JPL
32514	2001 OK_{34}	—	July 19, 2001	Palomar	NEAT	·	10 km	MPC · JPL
32515	2001 OU_{42}	—	July 22, 2001	Palomar	NEAT	·	3.3 km	MPC · JPL
32516 Simoneieva	2001 OH_{46}	Simoneieva	July 16, 2001	Anderson Mesa	LONEOS	V	2.4 km	MPC · JPL
32517	2001 OA_{54}	—	July 21, 2001	Palomar	NEAT	EUN	6.2 km	MPC · JPL
32518 Ktramesh	2001 OZ_{69}	Ktramesh	July 19, 2001	Anderson Mesa	LONEOS	(5)	3.4 km	MPC · JPL
32519 Timholt	2001 OB_{73}	Timholt	July 21, 2001	Anderson Mesa	LONEOS	NYS ·	4.8 km	MPC · JPL
32520 Jontihorner	2001 OG_{73}	Jontihorner	July 21, 2001	Anderson Mesa	LONEOS	GEF	4.0 km	MPC · JPL
32521	2001 OR_{80}	—	July 29, 2001	Socorro	LINEAR	·	4.8 km	MPC · JPL
32522 Judiepersons	2001 OE_{81}	Judiepersons	July 29, 2001	Socorro	LINEAR	V	2.4 km	MPC · JPL
32523	2001 OY_{82}	—	July 27, 2001	Palomar	NEAT	·	9.8 km	MPC · JPL
32524 Roberthowie	2001 OC_{85}	Roberthowie	July 20, 2001	Anderson Mesa	LONEOS	·	8.9 km	MPC · JPL
32525 Kynanhughson	2001 OZ_{85}	Kynanhughson	July 21, 2001	Anderson Mesa	LONEOS	·	2.6 km	MPC · JPL
32526	2001 OD_{98}	—	July 25, 2001	Palomar	NEAT	EOS	8.6 km	MPC · JPL
32527 Junko	2001 OS_{104}	Junko	July 28, 2001	Anderson Mesa	LONEOS	HOF	11 km	MPC · JPL
32528	2001 OZ_{105}	—	July 29, 2001	Socorro	LINEAR	(5651)	18 km	MPC · JPL
32529	2001 PD_{7}	—	August 10, 2001	Haleakala	NEAT	DOR	6.7 km	MPC · JPL
32530	2001 PW_{12}	—	August 12, 2001	Ametlla de Mar	J. Nomen	PHO	4.8 km	MPC · JPL
32531 Ulrikababiaková	2001 PG_{13}	Ulrikababiaková	August 13, 2001	Ondřejov	P. Kušnirák	EUN	5.7 km	MPC · JPL
32532 Thereus	2001 PT_{13}	Thereus	August 9, 2001	Palomar	NEAT	centaur	86 km	MPC · JPL
32533 Tranpham	2001 PS_{29}	Tranpham	August 11, 2001	Socorro	LINEAR	·	3.3 km	MPC · JPL
32534	2001 PL_{37}	—	August 11, 2001	Palomar	NEAT	slow	14 km	MPC · JPL
32535	2001 PZ_{40}	—	August 11, 2001	Palomar	NEAT	·	4.2 km	MPC · JPL
32536	2001 PD_{41}	—	August 11, 2001	Palomar	NEAT	·	21 km	MPC · JPL
32537	2001 PH_{43}	—	August 13, 2001	Haleakala	NEAT	·	1.9 km	MPC · JPL
32538	2001 PB_{44}	—	August 15, 2001	Haleakala	NEAT	·	1.8 km	MPC · JPL
32539	2001 PD_{59}	—	August 14, 2001	Haleakala	NEAT	slow	3.8 km	MPC · JPL
32540	2001 PN_{62}	—	August 13, 2001	Haleakala	NEAT	·	11 km	MPC · JPL
32541	2001 QF_{2}	—	August 17, 2001	Ametlla de Mar	J. Nomen	V	3.0 km	MPC · JPL
32542	2001 QK_{7}	—	August 16, 2001	Socorro	LINEAR	3:2	20 km	MPC · JPL
32543	2001 QL_{11}	—	August 16, 2001	Socorro	LINEAR	·	2.5 km	MPC · JPL
32544 Debjaniroy	2001 QY_{11}	Debjaniroy	August 16, 2001	Socorro	LINEAR	·	2.3 km	MPC · JPL
32545	2001 QV_{13}	—	August 16, 2001	Socorro	LINEAR	GEF	5.9 km	MPC · JPL
32546	2001 QE_{14}	—	August 16, 2001	Socorro	LINEAR	THM	8.5 km	MPC · JPL
32547 Shandroff	2001 QW_{14}	Shandroff	August 16, 2001	Socorro	LINEAR	·	2.0 km	MPC · JPL
32548	2001 QU_{18}	—	August 16, 2001	Socorro	LINEAR	EOS	5.9 km	MPC · JPL
32549 Taricco	2001 QA_{19}	Taricco	August 16, 2001	Socorro	LINEAR	·	2.4 km	MPC · JPL
32550 Sharonthomas	2001 QT_{19}	Sharonthomas	August 16, 2001	Socorro	LINEAR	·	2.3 km	MPC · JPL
32551	2001 QF_{22}	—	August 16, 2001	Socorro	LINEAR	·	2.3 km	MPC · JPL
32552 Jennithomas	2001 QU_{23}	Jennithomas	August 16, 2001	Socorro	LINEAR	·	2.4 km	MPC · JPL
32553	2001 QC_{27}	—	August 16, 2001	Socorro	LINEAR	CYB	12 km	MPC · JPL
32554	2001 QZ_{28}	—	August 16, 2001	Socorro	LINEAR	·	6.6 km	MPC · JPL
32555	2001 QZ_{29}	—	August 16, 2001	Socorro	LINEAR	·	10 km	MPC · JPL
32556 Jennivibber	2001 QH_{30}	Jennivibber	August 16, 2001	Socorro	LINEAR	·	2.7 km	MPC · JPL
32557	2001 QT_{30}	—	August 16, 2001	Socorro	LINEAR	KOR	3.9 km	MPC · JPL
32558	2001 QV_{30}	—	August 16, 2001	Socorro	LINEAR	·	15 km	MPC · JPL
32559	2001 QN_{31}	—	August 16, 2001	Socorro	LINEAR	NYS	4.3 km	MPC · JPL
32560	2001 QV_{31}	—	August 16, 2001	Socorro	LINEAR	·	5.1 km	MPC · JPL
32561 Waldron	2001 QE_{38}	Waldron	August 16, 2001	Socorro	LINEAR	·	3.6 km	MPC · JPL
32562 Caseywarner	2001 QA_{45}	Caseywarner	August 16, 2001	Socorro	LINEAR	·	3.3 km	MPC · JPL
32563 Nicolezaidi	2001 QA_{53}	Nicolezaidi	August 16, 2001	Socorro	LINEAR	KOR	3.6 km	MPC · JPL
32564 Glass	2001 QM_{68}	Glass	August 20, 2001	Terre Haute	Wolfe, C.	·	5.2 km	MPC · JPL
32565	2001 QC_{69}	—	August 17, 2001	Socorro	LINEAR	EUN	4.8 km	MPC · JPL
32566	2001 QC_{70}	—	August 17, 2001	Socorro	LINEAR	EOS	5.6 km	MPC · JPL
32567	2001 QQ_{70}	—	August 17, 2001	Socorro	LINEAR	GEF	6.4 km	MPC · JPL
32568	2001 QD_{71}	—	August 18, 2001	Socorro	LINEAR	·	3.3 km	MPC · JPL
32569 Deming	2001 QW_{71}	Deming	August 20, 2001	Terre Haute	Wolfe, C.	·	11 km	MPC · JPL
32570 Peruindiana	2001 QZ_{71}	Peruindiana	August 20, 2001	Terre Haute	Wolfe, C.	·	8.2 km	MPC · JPL
32571 Brayton	2001 QA_{72}	Brayton	August 20, 2001	Terre Haute	Wolfe, C.	·	8.3 km	MPC · JPL
32572	2001 QR_{74}	—	August 16, 2001	Socorro	LINEAR	·	5.5 km	MPC · JPL
32573	2001 QD_{75}	—	August 16, 2001	Socorro	LINEAR	KOR	3.3 km	MPC · JPL
32574	2001 QM_{78}	—	August 16, 2001	Socorro	LINEAR	·	7.9 km	MPC · JPL
32575	2001 QY_{78}	—	August 16, 2001	Socorro	LINEAR	·	2.2 km	MPC · JPL
32576	2001 QK_{79}	—	August 16, 2001	Socorro	LINEAR	·	7.5 km	MPC · JPL
32577	2001 QC_{87}	—	August 17, 2001	Palomar	NEAT	EUN · slow	5.2 km	MPC · JPL
32578	2001 QY_{88}	—	August 22, 2001	Socorro	LINEAR	·	17 km	MPC · JPL
32579 Allendavia	2001 QJ_{97}	Allendavia	August 17, 2001	Socorro	LINEAR	V	2.6 km	MPC · JPL
32580 Avbalasingam	2001 QY_{97}	Avbalasingam	August 18, 2001	Socorro	LINEAR	·	1.8 km	MPC · JPL
32581	2001 QW_{98}	—	August 21, 2001	Socorro	LINEAR	·	2.6 km	MPC · JPL
32582 Mayachandar	2001 QW_{101}	Mayachandar	August 18, 2001	Socorro	LINEAR	MAS	1.8 km	MPC · JPL
32583	2001 QZ_{101}	—	August 18, 2001	Socorro	LINEAR	HNS	5.2 km	MPC · JPL
32584 Michaelcollins	2001 QW_{105}	Michaelcollins	August 18, 2001	Anderson Mesa	LONEOS	HNS	3.0 km	MPC · JPL
32585 Tardivel	2001 QQ_{107}	Tardivel	August 18, 2001	Anderson Mesa	LONEOS	·	3.7 km	MPC · JPL
32586	2001 QQ_{116}	—	August 17, 2001	Socorro	LINEAR	·	11 km	MPC · JPL
32587	2001 QO_{117}	—	August 17, 2001	Socorro	LINEAR	·	3.1 km	MPC · JPL
32588	2001 QD_{124}	—	August 19, 2001	Socorro	LINEAR	·	3.2 km	MPC · JPL
32589	2001 QR_{127}	—	August 20, 2001	Socorro	LINEAR	·	7.9 km	MPC · JPL
32590 Cynthiachen	2001 QF_{130}	Cynthiachen	August 20, 2001	Socorro	LINEAR	V	1.8 km	MPC · JPL
32591	2001 QV_{134}	—	August 22, 2001	Socorro	LINEAR	EOS	8.8 km	MPC · JPL
32592	2001 QR_{135}	—	August 22, 2001	Socorro	LINEAR	·	4.6 km	MPC · JPL
32593 Crotty	2001 QK_{138}	Crotty	August 22, 2001	Socorro	LINEAR	·	2.9 km	MPC · JPL
32594 Nathandeng	2001 QV_{141}	Nathandeng	August 24, 2001	Socorro	LINEAR	·	3.5 km	MPC · JPL
32595	2001 QA_{150}	—	August 25, 2001	Palomar	NEAT	V	1.5 km	MPC · JPL
32596 Čepek	2001 QS_{154}	Čepek	August 29, 2001	Kleť	M. Tichý	V	1.9 km	MPC · JPL
32597 Alicelucchetti	2001 QC_{157}	Alicelucchetti	August 23, 2001	Anderson Mesa	LONEOS	·	2.9 km	MPC · JPL
32598 Vanialorenzi	2001 QN_{159}	Vanialorenzi	August 23, 2001	Anderson Mesa	LONEOS	AST	5.2 km	MPC · JPL
32599 Pedromachado	2001 QL_{160}	Pedromachado	August 23, 2001	Anderson Mesa	LONEOS	·	2.8 km	MPC · JPL
32600	2001 QF_{173}	—	August 25, 2001	Socorro	LINEAR	·	6.8 km	MPC · JPL

== 32601–32700 ==
back to top

Designation			Discovery			Properties		Ref
Permanent	Provisional	Named after	Date	Site	Discoverer(s)	Category	Diam.	Ref
32601	2001 QA_{181}	—	August 26, 2001	Palomar	NEAT	·	6.9 km	MPC · JPL
32602	2001 QE_{185}	—	August 21, 2001	Socorro	LINEAR	EOS	9.4 km	MPC · JPL
32603 Ariaeppinger	2001 QL_{199}	Ariaeppinger	August 22, 2001	Socorro	LINEAR	EOS	5.4 km	MPC · JPL
32604 Meganmansfield	2001 QP_{212}	Meganmansfield	August 23, 2001	Anderson Mesa	LONEOS	MAS	1.5 km	MPC · JPL
32605 Lucy	2001 QM_{213}	Lucy	August 23, 2001	Desert Eagle	W. K. Y. Yeung	·	7.2 km	MPC · JPL
32606 Markkanen	2001 QY_{217}	Markkanen	August 23, 2001	Anderson Mesa	LONEOS	·	4.3 km	MPC · JPL
32607 Portell	2001 QH_{220}	Portell	August 23, 2001	Anderson Mesa	LONEOS	·	6.2 km	MPC · JPL
32608 Hallas	2001 QA_{231}	Hallas	August 24, 2001	Goodricke-Pigott	R. A. Tucker	(2076)	2.6 km	MPC · JPL
32609 Jamesfagan	2001 QF_{243}	Jamesfagan	August 24, 2001	Socorro	LINEAR	·	4.9 km	MPC · JPL
32610 Siennafink	2001 QA_{245}	Siennafink	August 24, 2001	Socorro	LINEAR	KOR	4.5 km	MPC · JPL
32611 Ananyaganesh	2001 QB_{253}	Ananyaganesh	August 25, 2001	Socorro	LINEAR	KOR	3.5 km	MPC · JPL
32612 Ghatare	2001 QA_{256}	Ghatare	August 25, 2001	Socorro	LINEAR	·	3.1 km	MPC · JPL
32613 Tseyuenman	2001 QU_{265}	Tseyuenman	August 27, 2001	Desert Eagle	W. K. Y. Yeung	·	2.4 km	MPC · JPL
32614 Hacegarcia	2001 QY_{266}	Hacegarcia	August 20, 2001	Socorro	LINEAR	·	2.8 km	MPC · JPL
32615	2001 QU_{277}	—	August 19, 2001	Socorro	LINEAR	L5	36 km	MPC · JPL
32616 Nadinehan	2001 QH_{279}	Nadinehan	August 19, 2001	Socorro	LINEAR	·	3.0 km	MPC · JPL
32617 Tiegs	2001 QY_{283}	Tiegs	August 18, 2001	Anderson Mesa	LONEOS	V	1.6 km	MPC · JPL
32618 Leungkamcheung	2001 QL_{293}	Leungkamcheung	August 31, 2001	Desert Eagle	W. K. Y. Yeung	·	4.4 km	MPC · JPL
32619 Lynnsawyer	2001 QC_{295}	Lynnsawyer	August 24, 2001	Anderson Mesa	LONEOS	·	4.3 km	MPC · JPL
32620	2001 QZ_{295}	—	August 24, 2001	Anderson Mesa	LONEOS	·	5.7 km	MPC · JPL
32621 Talcott	2001 RZ	Talcott	September 8, 2001	Goodricke-Pigott	R. A. Tucker	MAR	6.8 km	MPC · JPL
32622 Yuewaichun	2001 RZ_{16}	Yuewaichun	September 11, 2001	Desert Eagle	W. K. Y. Yeung	·	2.0 km	MPC · JPL
32623 Samuelkahn	2001 RV_{23}	Samuelkahn	September 7, 2001	Socorro	LINEAR	·	3.1 km	MPC · JPL
32624	2001 RQ_{44}	—	September 12, 2001	Palomar	NEAT	·	8.3 km	MPC · JPL
32625	2001 RZ_{45}	—	September 15, 2001	Ametlla de Mar	J. Nomen	·	5.0 km	MPC · JPL
32626	2001 RX_{64}	—	September 10, 2001	Socorro	LINEAR	V	3.4 km	MPC · JPL
32627	2001 RO_{69}	—	September 10, 2001	Socorro	LINEAR	·	9.2 km	MPC · JPL
32628 Lazorik	2001 RK_{70}	Lazorik	September 10, 2001	Socorro	LINEAR	·	2.2 km	MPC · JPL
32629	2001 RQ_{70}	—	September 10, 2001	Socorro	LINEAR	·	7.2 km	MPC · JPL
32630 Ethanlevy	2001 RZ_{71}	Ethanlevy	September 10, 2001	Socorro	LINEAR	·	3.7 km	MPC · JPL
32631 Majzoub	2001 RS_{74}	Majzoub	September 10, 2001	Socorro	LINEAR	·	3.0 km	MPC · JPL
32632	2001 RS_{75}	—	September 10, 2001	Socorro	LINEAR	NYS	3.4 km	MPC · JPL
32633 Honguyang	2001 RY_{93}	Honguyang	September 11, 2001	Anderson Mesa	LONEOS	THM	7.2 km	MPC · JPL
32634 Sonjamichaluk	2001 RU_{103}	Sonjamichaluk	September 12, 2001	Socorro	LINEAR	WIT	2.9 km	MPC · JPL
32635	2001 SN	—	September 16, 2001	Fountain Hills	Hills, Fountain	·	4.0 km	MPC · JPL
32636	2001 SD_{58}	—	September 17, 2001	Socorro	LINEAR	·	1.6 km	MPC · JPL
32637	2021 P-L	—	September 24, 1960	Palomar	C. J. van Houten, I. van Houten-Groeneveld, T. Gehrels	KON	6.5 km	MPC · JPL
32638	2042 P-L	—	September 24, 1960	Palomar	C. J. van Houten, I. van Houten-Groeneveld, T. Gehrels	·	3.1 km	MPC · JPL
32639	2050 P-L	—	September 24, 1960	Palomar	C. J. van Houten, I. van Houten-Groeneveld, T. Gehrels	NYS	2.5 km	MPC · JPL
32640	2531 P-L	—	September 24, 1960	Palomar	C. J. van Houten, I. van Houten-Groeneveld, T. Gehrels	·	4.4 km	MPC · JPL
32641	2595 P-L	—	September 24, 1960	Palomar	C. J. van Houten, I. van Houten-Groeneveld, T. Gehrels	·	2.3 km	MPC · JPL
32642	2601 P-L	—	September 24, 1960	Palomar	C. J. van Houten, I. van Houten-Groeneveld, T. Gehrels	·	10 km	MPC · JPL
32643	2609 P-L	—	September 24, 1960	Palomar	C. J. van Houten, I. van Houten-Groeneveld, T. Gehrels	·	1.6 km	MPC · JPL
32644	2723 P-L	—	September 24, 1960	Palomar	C. J. van Houten, I. van Houten-Groeneveld, T. Gehrels	·	2.1 km	MPC · JPL
32645	2763 P-L	—	September 24, 1960	Palomar	C. J. van Houten, I. van Houten-Groeneveld, T. Gehrels	·	4.1 km	MPC · JPL
32646	3010 P-L	—	September 24, 1960	Palomar	C. J. van Houten, I. van Houten-Groeneveld, T. Gehrels	·	6.0 km	MPC · JPL
32647	3109 P-L	—	September 24, 1960	Palomar	C. J. van Houten, I. van Houten-Groeneveld, T. Gehrels	NAE	7.2 km	MPC · JPL
32648	3538 P-L	—	October 17, 1960	Palomar	C. J. van Houten, I. van Houten-Groeneveld, T. Gehrels	·	3.5 km	MPC · JPL
32649	4056 P-L	—	September 24, 1960	Palomar	C. J. van Houten, I. van Houten-Groeneveld, T. Gehrels	NYS	2.6 km	MPC · JPL
32650	4070 P-L	—	September 24, 1960	Palomar	C. J. van Houten, I. van Houten-Groeneveld, T. Gehrels	(5)	4.4 km	MPC · JPL
32651	4208 P-L	—	September 24, 1960	Palomar	C. J. van Houten, I. van Houten-Groeneveld, T. Gehrels	·	3.4 km	MPC · JPL
32652	4319 P-L	—	September 24, 1960	Palomar	C. J. van Houten, I. van Houten-Groeneveld, T. Gehrels	·	1.4 km	MPC · JPL
32653	4635 P-L	—	September 24, 1960	Palomar	C. J. van Houten, I. van Houten-Groeneveld, T. Gehrels	·	2.2 km	MPC · JPL
32654	4640 P-L	—	September 24, 1960	Palomar	C. J. van Houten, I. van Houten-Groeneveld, T. Gehrels	·	7.3 km	MPC · JPL
32655	4692 P-L	—	September 24, 1960	Palomar	C. J. van Houten, I. van Houten-Groeneveld, T. Gehrels	NYS	3.6 km	MPC · JPL
32656	4711 P-L	—	September 24, 1960	Palomar	C. J. van Houten, I. van Houten-Groeneveld, T. Gehrels	AEO	2.1 km	MPC · JPL
32657	4721 P-L	—	September 24, 1960	Palomar	C. J. van Houten, I. van Houten-Groeneveld, T. Gehrels	·	4.5 km	MPC · JPL
32658	4800 P-L	—	September 24, 1960	Palomar	C. J. van Houten, I. van Houten-Groeneveld, T. Gehrels	NYS	2.2 km	MPC · JPL
32659	4804 P-L	—	September 24, 1960	Palomar	C. J. van Houten, I. van Houten-Groeneveld, T. Gehrels	·	3.6 km	MPC · JPL
32660	4826 P-L	—	September 24, 1960	Palomar	C. J. van Houten, I. van Houten-Groeneveld, T. Gehrels	KOR	3.3 km	MPC · JPL
32661	4848 P-L	—	September 24, 1960	Palomar	C. J. van Houten, I. van Houten-Groeneveld, T. Gehrels	NYS	4.5 km	MPC · JPL
32662	4900 P-L	—	September 24, 1960	Palomar	C. J. van Houten, I. van Houten-Groeneveld, T. Gehrels	·	9.1 km	MPC · JPL
32663	5553 P-L	—	October 17, 1960	Palomar	C. J. van Houten, I. van Houten-Groeneveld, T. Gehrels	·	2.2 km	MPC · JPL
32664	6072 P-L	—	September 24, 1960	Palomar	C. J. van Houten, I. van Houten-Groeneveld, T. Gehrels	·	5.4 km	MPC · JPL
32665	6107 P-L	—	September 24, 1960	Palomar	C. J. van Houten, I. van Houten-Groeneveld, T. Gehrels	·	3.5 km	MPC · JPL
32666	6124 P-L	—	September 24, 1960	Palomar	C. J. van Houten, I. van Houten-Groeneveld, T. Gehrels	ERI	4.1 km	MPC · JPL
32667	6180 P-L	—	September 24, 1960	Palomar	C. J. van Houten, I. van Houten-Groeneveld, T. Gehrels	·	2.3 km	MPC · JPL
32668	6278 P-L	—	September 24, 1960	Palomar	C. J. van Houten, I. van Houten-Groeneveld, T. Gehrels	·	5.2 km	MPC · JPL
32669	6287 P-L	—	September 24, 1960	Palomar	C. J. van Houten, I. van Houten-Groeneveld, T. Gehrels	·	6.4 km	MPC · JPL
32670	6323 P-L	—	September 24, 1960	Palomar	C. J. van Houten, I. van Houten-Groeneveld, T. Gehrels	NEM	4.4 km	MPC · JPL
32671	6537 P-L	—	September 24, 1960	Palomar	C. J. van Houten, I. van Houten-Groeneveld, T. Gehrels	·	3.9 km	MPC · JPL
32672	6720 P-L	—	September 24, 1960	Palomar	C. J. van Houten, I. van Houten-Groeneveld, T. Gehrels	·	4.2 km	MPC · JPL
32673	6742 P-L	—	September 24, 1960	Palomar	C. J. van Houten, I. van Houten-Groeneveld, T. Gehrels	·	1.6 km	MPC · JPL
32674	6750 P-L	—	September 24, 1960	Palomar	C. J. van Houten, I. van Houten-Groeneveld, T. Gehrels	NYS	4.4 km	MPC · JPL
32675	6755 P-L	—	September 24, 1960	Palomar	C. J. van Houten, I. van Houten-Groeneveld, T. Gehrels	·	3.5 km	MPC · JPL
32676	6802 P-L	—	September 24, 1960	Palomar	C. J. van Houten, I. van Houten-Groeneveld, T. Gehrels	·	2.1 km	MPC · JPL
32677	6806 P-L	—	September 24, 1960	Palomar	C. J. van Houten, I. van Houten-Groeneveld, T. Gehrels	KOR	3.1 km	MPC · JPL
32678	7566 P-L	—	October 17, 1960	Palomar	C. J. van Houten, I. van Houten-Groeneveld, T. Gehrels	·	4.3 km	MPC · JPL
32679	1070 T-1	—	March 25, 1971	Palomar	C. J. van Houten, I. van Houten-Groeneveld, T. Gehrels	·	8.1 km	MPC · JPL
32680	1095 T-1	—	March 25, 1971	Palomar	C. J. van Houten, I. van Houten-Groeneveld, T. Gehrels	·	7.7 km	MPC · JPL
32681	1166 T-1	—	March 25, 1971	Palomar	C. J. van Houten, I. van Houten-Groeneveld, T. Gehrels	·	4.5 km	MPC · JPL
32682	1177 T-1	—	March 25, 1971	Palomar	C. J. van Houten, I. van Houten-Groeneveld, T. Gehrels	·	4.8 km	MPC · JPL
32683	1202 T-1	—	March 25, 1971	Palomar	C. J. van Houten, I. van Houten-Groeneveld, T. Gehrels	·	2.1 km	MPC · JPL
32684	1269 T-1	—	March 25, 1971	Palomar	C. J. van Houten, I. van Houten-Groeneveld, T. Gehrels	GEF	3.4 km	MPC · JPL
32685	1294 T-1	—	March 25, 1971	Palomar	C. J. van Houten, I. van Houten-Groeneveld, T. Gehrels	NYS	2.2 km	MPC · JPL
32686	2072 T-1	—	March 25, 1971	Palomar	C. J. van Houten, I. van Houten-Groeneveld, T. Gehrels	THM	7.2 km	MPC · JPL
32687	3166 T-1	—	March 26, 1971	Palomar	C. J. van Houten, I. van Houten-Groeneveld, T. Gehrels	MAR	3.4 km	MPC · JPL
32688	4025 T-1	—	March 26, 1971	Palomar	C. J. van Houten, I. van Houten-Groeneveld, T. Gehrels	·	2.7 km	MPC · JPL
32689	4043 T-1	—	March 26, 1971	Palomar	C. J. van Houten, I. van Houten-Groeneveld, T. Gehrels	ERI	5.0 km	MPC · JPL
32690	4075 T-1	—	March 26, 1971	Palomar	C. J. van Houten, I. van Houten-Groeneveld, T. Gehrels	·	5.6 km	MPC · JPL
32691	4269 T-1	—	March 26, 1971	Palomar	C. J. van Houten, I. van Houten-Groeneveld, T. Gehrels	·	5.3 km	MPC · JPL
32692	4329 T-1	—	March 26, 1971	Palomar	C. J. van Houten, I. van Houten-Groeneveld, T. Gehrels	·	4.8 km	MPC · JPL
32693	4339 T-1	—	March 26, 1971	Palomar	C. J. van Houten, I. van Houten-Groeneveld, T. Gehrels	·	3.0 km	MPC · JPL
32694	4408 T-1	—	March 26, 1971	Palomar	C. J. van Houten, I. van Houten-Groeneveld, T. Gehrels	·	4.3 km	MPC · JPL
32695	1016 T-2	—	September 29, 1973	Palomar	C. J. van Houten, I. van Houten-Groeneveld, T. Gehrels	PAD	5.4 km	MPC · JPL
32696	1055 T-2	—	September 29, 1973	Palomar	C. J. van Houten, I. van Houten-Groeneveld, T. Gehrels	·	2.9 km	MPC · JPL
32697	1069 T-2	—	September 29, 1973	Palomar	C. J. van Houten, I. van Houten-Groeneveld, T. Gehrels	·	1.6 km	MPC · JPL
32698	1104 T-2	—	September 29, 1973	Palomar	C. J. van Houten, I. van Houten-Groeneveld, T. Gehrels	·	2.5 km	MPC · JPL
32699	1286 T-2	—	September 29, 1973	Palomar	C. J. van Houten, I. van Houten-Groeneveld, T. Gehrels	·	1.8 km	MPC · JPL
32700	1351 T-2	—	September 29, 1973	Palomar	C. J. van Houten, I. van Houten-Groeneveld, T. Gehrels	(21344)	5.7 km	MPC · JPL

== 32701–32800 ==
back to top

Designation			Discovery			Properties		Ref
Permanent	Provisional	Named after	Date	Site	Discoverer(s)	Category	Diam.	Ref
32701	1353 T-2	—	September 29, 1973	Palomar	C. J. van Houten, I. van Houten-Groeneveld, T. Gehrels	·	3.2 km	MPC · JPL
32702	2028 T-2	—	September 29, 1973	Palomar	C. J. van Houten, I. van Houten-Groeneveld, T. Gehrels	·	5.4 km	MPC · JPL
32703	2087 T-2	—	September 29, 1973	Palomar	C. J. van Houten, I. van Houten-Groeneveld, T. Gehrels	·	7.2 km	MPC · JPL
32704	2140 T-2	—	September 29, 1973	Palomar	C. J. van Houten, I. van Houten-Groeneveld, T. Gehrels	·	17 km	MPC · JPL
32705	2157 T-2	—	September 29, 1973	Palomar	C. J. van Houten, I. van Houten-Groeneveld, T. Gehrels	·	9.4 km	MPC · JPL
32706	2212 T-2	—	September 29, 1973	Palomar	C. J. van Houten, I. van Houten-Groeneveld, T. Gehrels	·	4.0 km	MPC · JPL
32707	3089 T-2	—	September 30, 1973	Palomar	C. J. van Houten, I. van Houten-Groeneveld, T. Gehrels	THM	7.6 km	MPC · JPL
32708	3160 T-2	—	September 30, 1973	Palomar	C. J. van Houten, I. van Houten-Groeneveld, T. Gehrels	·	6.7 km	MPC · JPL
32709	3355 T-2	—	September 25, 1973	Palomar	C. J. van Houten, I. van Houten-Groeneveld, T. Gehrels	·	5.3 km	MPC · JPL
32710	4063 T-2	—	September 29, 1973	Palomar	C. J. van Houten, I. van Houten-Groeneveld, T. Gehrels	·	1.9 km	MPC · JPL
32711	4132 T-2	—	September 29, 1973	Palomar	C. J. van Houten, I. van Houten-Groeneveld, T. Gehrels	·	4.8 km	MPC · JPL
32712	4135 T-2	—	September 29, 1973	Palomar	C. J. van Houten, I. van Houten-Groeneveld, T. Gehrels	·	7.0 km	MPC · JPL
32713	4159 T-2	—	September 29, 1973	Palomar	C. J. van Houten, I. van Houten-Groeneveld, T. Gehrels	·	7.3 km	MPC · JPL
32714	5008 T-2	—	September 25, 1973	Palomar	C. J. van Houten, I. van Houten-Groeneveld, T. Gehrels	·	1.9 km	MPC · JPL
32715	5105 T-2	—	September 25, 1973	Palomar	C. J. van Houten, I. van Houten-Groeneveld, T. Gehrels	·	7.3 km	MPC · JPL
32716	5133 T-2	—	September 25, 1973	Palomar	C. J. van Houten, I. van Houten-Groeneveld, T. Gehrels	·	5.0 km	MPC · JPL
32717	5155 T-2	—	September 25, 1973	Palomar	C. J. van Houten, I. van Houten-Groeneveld, T. Gehrels	·	3.8 km	MPC · JPL
32718	1103 T-3	—	October 17, 1977	Palomar	C. J. van Houten, I. van Houten-Groeneveld, T. Gehrels	·	2.1 km	MPC · JPL
32719	1153 T-3	—	October 17, 1977	Palomar	C. J. van Houten, I. van Houten-Groeneveld, T. Gehrels	·	2.2 km	MPC · JPL
32720 Simoeisios	2131 T-3	Simoeisios	October 16, 1977	Palomar	C. J. van Houten, I. van Houten-Groeneveld, T. Gehrels	L5	21 km	MPC · JPL
32721	2335 T-3	—	October 16, 1977	Palomar	C. J. van Houten, I. van Houten-Groeneveld, T. Gehrels	·	3.5 km	MPC · JPL
32722	3340 T-3	—	October 16, 1977	Palomar	C. J. van Houten, I. van Houten-Groeneveld, T. Gehrels	·	3.8 km	MPC · JPL
32723	4028 T-3	—	October 16, 1977	Palomar	C. J. van Houten, I. van Houten-Groeneveld, T. Gehrels	·	8.2 km	MPC · JPL
32724 Woerlitz	4029 T-3	Woerlitz	October 16, 1977	Palomar	C. J. van Houten, I. van Houten-Groeneveld, T. Gehrels	HIL · 3:2	11 km	MPC · JPL
32725	4057 T-3	—	October 16, 1977	Palomar	C. J. van Houten, I. van Houten-Groeneveld, T. Gehrels	·	2.0 km	MPC · JPL
32726 Chromios	4179 T-3	Chromios	October 16, 1977	Palomar	C. J. van Houten, I. van Houten-Groeneveld, T. Gehrels	L5	20 km	MPC · JPL
32727	4268 T-3	—	October 16, 1977	Palomar	C. J. van Houten, I. van Houten-Groeneveld, T. Gehrels	·	1.7 km	MPC · JPL
32728	4517 T-3	—	October 16, 1977	Palomar	C. J. van Houten, I. van Houten-Groeneveld, T. Gehrels	·	1.6 km	MPC · JPL
32729	5179 T-3	—	October 16, 1977	Palomar	C. J. van Houten, I. van Houten-Groeneveld, T. Gehrels	·	11 km	MPC · JPL
32730 Lamarr	1951 RX	Lamarr	September 4, 1951	Heidelberg	K. Reinmuth	·	3.1 km	MPC · JPL
32731 Annaivanovna	1968 OD_{1}	Annaivanovna	July 25, 1968	Cerro El Roble	Plyugin, G. A., Yu. A. Belyaev	·	2.4 km	MPC · JPL
32732	1975 SH_{1}	—	September 30, 1975	Palomar	S. J. Bus	KOR	2.8 km	MPC · JPL
32733	1976 SB	—	September 23, 1976	Harvard Observatory	Harvard Observatory	·	2.7 km	MPC · JPL
32734 Kryukov	1978 RM	Kryukov	September 1, 1978	Nauchnij	N. S. Chernykh	THM	10 km	MPC · JPL
32735 Strekalov	1978 SX_{4}	Strekalov	September 27, 1978	Nauchnij	L. I. Chernykh	·	7.9 km	MPC · JPL
32736	1978 UE_{5}	—	October 27, 1978	Palomar	C. M. Olmstead	·	2.2 km	MPC · JPL
32737	1978 UZ_{6}	—	October 27, 1978	Palomar	C. M. Olmstead	·	2.4 km	MPC · JPL
32738	1978 VT_{1}	—	November 1, 1978	Caussols	K. Tomita	·	5.2 km	MPC · JPL
32739	1978 VA_{5}	—	November 7, 1978	Palomar	E. F. Helin, S. J. Bus	·	6.4 km	MPC · JPL
32740	1978 VB_{7}	—	November 7, 1978	Palomar	E. F. Helin, S. J. Bus	·	5.8 km	MPC · JPL
32741	1978 VX_{8}	—	November 7, 1978	Palomar	E. F. Helin, S. J. Bus	THM	4.9 km	MPC · JPL
32742	1978 VB_{10}	—	November 7, 1978	Palomar	E. F. Helin, S. J. Bus	·	6.0 km	MPC · JPL
32743	1979 MR_{1}	—	June 25, 1979	Siding Spring	E. F. Helin, S. J. Bus	·	6.8 km	MPC · JPL
32744	1979 MR_{5}	—	June 25, 1979	Siding Spring	E. F. Helin, S. J. Bus	·	4.0 km	MPC · JPL
32745	1981 DO_{1}	—	February 28, 1981	Siding Spring	S. J. Bus	·	2.9 km	MPC · JPL
32746	1981 EW_{2}	—	March 2, 1981	Siding Spring	S. J. Bus	·	4.8 km	MPC · JPL
32747	1981 EY_{5}	—	March 7, 1981	Siding Spring	S. J. Bus	·	7.3 km	MPC · JPL
32748	1981 EY_{7}	—	March 1, 1981	Siding Spring	S. J. Bus	·	1.6 km	MPC · JPL
32749	1981 EA_{9}	—	March 1, 1981	Siding Spring	S. J. Bus	·	4.4 km	MPC · JPL
32750	1981 EG_{9}	—	March 1, 1981	Siding Spring	S. J. Bus	slow?	8.0 km	MPC · JPL
32751	1981 EB_{12}	—	March 1, 1981	Siding Spring	S. J. Bus	(1298)	8.2 km	MPC · JPL
32752	1981 EZ_{13}	—	March 1, 1981	Siding Spring	S. J. Bus	·	5.0 km	MPC · JPL
32753	1981 EB_{14}	—	March 1, 1981	Siding Spring	S. J. Bus	·	6.6 km	MPC · JPL
32754	1981 EK_{15}	—	March 1, 1981	Siding Spring	S. J. Bus	·	6.2 km	MPC · JPL
32755	1981 EP_{15}	—	March 1, 1981	Siding Spring	S. J. Bus	·	2.8 km	MPC · JPL
32756	1981 ER_{15}	—	March 1, 1981	Siding Spring	S. J. Bus	·	1.9 km	MPC · JPL
32757	1981 EP_{18}	—	March 2, 1981	Siding Spring	S. J. Bus	·	7.7 km	MPC · JPL
32758	1981 ES_{18}	—	March 2, 1981	Siding Spring	S. J. Bus	·	2.1 km	MPC · JPL
32759	1981 EC_{28}	—	March 2, 1981	Siding Spring	S. J. Bus	·	1.6 km	MPC · JPL
32760	1981 ER_{28}	—	March 6, 1981	Siding Spring	S. J. Bus	·	6.1 km	MPC · JPL
32761	1981 ED_{31}	—	March 2, 1981	Siding Spring	S. J. Bus	·	3.1 km	MPC · JPL
32762	1981 ER_{32}	—	March 7, 1981	Siding Spring	S. J. Bus	·	5.9 km	MPC · JPL
32763	1981 EH_{35}	—	March 2, 1981	Siding Spring	S. J. Bus	·	2.2 km	MPC · JPL
32764	1981 EL_{36}	—	March 7, 1981	Siding Spring	S. J. Bus	·	2.2 km	MPC · JPL
32765	1981 EC_{40}	—	March 2, 1981	Siding Spring	S. J. Bus	·	7.7 km	MPC · JPL
32766 Voskresenskoe	1982 UY_{7}	Voskresenskoe	October 21, 1982	Nauchnij	L. V. Zhuravleva	·	3.3 km	MPC · JPL
32767	1983 RY_{2}	—	September 1, 1983	La Silla	H. Debehogne	·	3.2 km	MPC · JPL
32768 Alexandripatov	1983 RZ_{4}	Alexandripatov	September 5, 1983	Nauchnij	L. V. Zhuravleva	·	2.1 km	MPC · JPL
32769	1984 AJ_{1}	—	January 8, 1984	Anderson Mesa	E. Bowell	·	6.6 km	MPC · JPL
32770 Starchik	1984 YY_{1}	Starchik	December 23, 1984	Nauchnij	L. G. Karachkina	·	4.5 km	MPC · JPL
32771	1985 RK_{3}	—	September 6, 1985	La Silla	H. Debehogne	·	3.4 km	MPC · JPL
32772	1986 JL	—	May 11, 1986	Caussols	C. Pollas	H	6.0 km	MPC · JPL
32773	1986 TD	—	October 5, 1986	Piwnice	M. Antal	PAL	5.9 km	MPC · JPL
32774	1986 VZ	—	November 3, 1986	Kleť	A. Mrkos	·	4.9 km	MPC · JPL
32775	1986 WP_{2}	—	November 29, 1986	Toyota	K. Suzuki, T. Urata	NYS	4.0 km	MPC · JPL
32776 Nriag	1987 KG_{5}	Nriag	May 29, 1987	Palomar	C. S. Shoemaker, E. M. Shoemaker	EUN	6.3 km	MPC · JPL
32777	1987 QF_{1}	—	August 21, 1987	Kleť	Z. Vávrová	·	3.9 km	MPC · JPL
32778	1988 CW_{1}	—	February 11, 1988	La Silla	E. W. Elst	GEF	3.5 km	MPC · JPL
32779	1988 CZ_{2}	—	February 11, 1988	La Silla	E. W. Elst	·	1.6 km	MPC · JPL
32780	1988 CR_{5}	—	February 13, 1988	La Silla	E. W. Elst	·	4.1 km	MPC · JPL
32781	1988 DD_{2}	—	February 17, 1988	La Silla	E. W. Elst	·	3.9 km	MPC · JPL
32782	1988 RX_{10}	—	September 14, 1988	Cerro Tololo	S. J. Bus	·	8.3 km	MPC · JPL
32783	1988 RK_{13}	—	September 14, 1988	Cerro Tololo	S. J. Bus	·	4.6 km	MPC · JPL
32784	1989 AR	—	January 4, 1989	Kushiro	S. Ueda, H. Kaneda	·	4.7 km	MPC · JPL
32785	1989 CU_{1}	—	February 10, 1989	Gekko	Y. Oshima	·	2.4 km	MPC · JPL
32786	1989 GW_{2}	—	April 3, 1989	La Silla	E. W. Elst	·	2.3 km	MPC · JPL
32787	1989 ST_{1}	—	September 26, 1989	La Silla	E. W. Elst	·	2.2 km	MPC · JPL
32788	1989 SJ_{3}	—	September 26, 1989	La Silla	E. W. Elst	THM	8.8 km	MPC · JPL
32789	1989 SF_{5}	—	September 26, 1989	La Silla	E. W. Elst	·	6.4 km	MPC · JPL
32790	1989 SM_{8}	—	September 23, 1989	La Silla	H. Debehogne	MAS	2.7 km	MPC · JPL
32791	1989 TQ_{2}	—	October 3, 1989	Cerro Tololo	S. J. Bus	·	13 km	MPC · JPL
32792	1989 TR_{7}	—	October 7, 1989	La Silla	E. W. Elst	EOS	4.1 km	MPC · JPL
32793	1989 TQ_{15}	—	October 3, 1989	La Silla	H. Debehogne	NYS	4.2 km	MPC · JPL
32794	1989 UE_{5}	—	October 30, 1989	Cerro Tololo	S. J. Bus	L5	14 km	MPC · JPL
32795	1989 WA_{3}	—	November 21, 1989	Gekko	Y. Oshima	·	7.7 km	MPC · JPL
32796 Ehrenfest	1990 ET_{2}	Ehrenfest	March 2, 1990	La Silla	E. W. Elst	EUN	5.2 km	MPC · JPL
32797	1990 OJ	—	July 18, 1990	Palomar	E. F. Helin	·	4.4 km	MPC · JPL
32798	1990 OA_{2}	—	July 29, 1990	Palomar	H. E. Holt	·	7.6 km	MPC · JPL
32799	1990 QN_{1}	—	August 22, 1990	Palomar	H. E. Holt	·	3.2 km	MPC · JPL
32800	1990 QC_{19}	—	August 17, 1990	Palomar	Rose, P.	H	2.8 km	MPC · JPL

== 32801–32900 ==
back to top

Designation			Discovery			Properties		Ref
Permanent	Provisional	Named after	Date	Site	Discoverer(s)	Category	Diam.	Ref
32801	1990 RF_{5}	—	September 15, 1990	Palomar	H. E. Holt	·	2.1 km	MPC · JPL
32802	1990 SK	—	September 20, 1990	Siding Spring	R. H. McNaught	·	4.2 km	MPC · JPL
32803	1990 SR_{1}	—	September 18, 1990	Palomar	H. E. Holt	·	2.7 km	MPC · JPL
32804	1990 SO_{2}	—	September 17, 1990	Palomar	H. E. Holt	·	3.3 km	MPC · JPL
32805	1990 SM_{3}	—	September 18, 1990	Palomar	H. E. Holt	·	2.9 km	MPC · JPL
32806	1990 SF_{13}	—	September 22, 1990	La Silla	H. Debehogne	MAS	2.0 km	MPC · JPL
32807 Quarenghi	1990 SN_{28}	Quarenghi	September 24, 1990	Nauchnij	L. V. Zhuravleva, G. R. Kastelʹ	·	6.0 km	MPC · JPL
32808 Bischoff	1990 TP_{2}	Bischoff	October 10, 1990	Tautenburg Observatory	L. D. Schmadel, F. Börngen	HYG	9.1 km	MPC · JPL
32809 Sommerfeld	1990 TJ_{10}	Sommerfeld	October 10, 1990	Tautenburg Observatory	F. Börngen, L. D. Schmadel	TEL	3.7 km	MPC · JPL
32810 Steinbach	1990 TS_{10}	Steinbach	October 10, 1990	Tautenburg Observatory	L. D. Schmadel, F. Börngen	NYS	3.2 km	MPC · JPL
32811 Apisaon	1990 TP_{12}	Apisaon	October 14, 1990	Tautenburg Observatory	F. Börngen, L. D. Schmadel	L5	28 km	MPC · JPL
32812	1990 UY_{4}	—	October 16, 1990	La Silla	E. W. Elst	(2076)	2.9 km	MPC · JPL
32813	1990 WH_{4}	—	November 16, 1990	La Silla	E. W. Elst	·	3.2 km	MPC · JPL
32814	1990 XZ	—	December 15, 1990	Palomar	E. F. Helin	H	2.4 km	MPC · JPL
32815 Mitsufumi	1991 GK_{1}	Mitsufumi	April 14, 1991	Kitami	K. Endate, K. Watanabe	NYS ·	7.0 km	MPC · JPL
32816	1991 PP_{1}	—	August 2, 1991	La Silla	E. W. Elst	·	4.0 km	MPC · JPL
32817	1991 PZ_{5}	—	August 6, 1991	La Silla	E. W. Elst	·	4.7 km	MPC · JPL
32818	1991 PL_{10}	—	August 14, 1991	La Silla	E. W. Elst	·	3.9 km	MPC · JPL
32819	1991 PM_{15}	—	August 8, 1991	Palomar	H. E. Holt	·	5.7 km	MPC · JPL
32820	1991 PU_{19}	—	August 8, 1991	Palomar	H. E. Holt	·	6.1 km	MPC · JPL
32821 Posch	1991 RC_{3}	Posch	September 9, 1991	Tautenburg Observatory	L. D. Schmadel, F. Börngen	·	5.2 km	MPC · JPL
32822	1991 RB_{16}	—	September 15, 1991	Palomar	H. E. Holt	·	1.9 km	MPC · JPL
32823	1991 TM_{8}	—	October 1, 1991	Kitt Peak	Spacewatch	·	4.5 km	MPC · JPL
32824	1992 CJ_{3}	—	February 2, 1992	La Silla	E. W. Elst	·	5.6 km	MPC · JPL
32825	1992 CK_{3}	—	February 2, 1992	La Silla	E. W. Elst	·	2.6 km	MPC · JPL
32826	1992 DC_{1}	—	February 26, 1992	Kushiro	S. Ueda, H. Kaneda	·	2.8 km	MPC · JPL
32827	1992 DF_{1}	—	February 28, 1992	Kitt Peak	Spacewatch	·	2.4 km	MPC · JPL
32828	1992 DM_{8}	—	February 29, 1992	La Silla	UESAC	·	4.6 km	MPC · JPL
32829	1992 DT_{10}	—	February 29, 1992	La Silla	UESAC	·	1.8 km	MPC · JPL
32830	1992 DL_{11}	—	February 29, 1992	La Silla	UESAC	V	4.2 km	MPC · JPL
32831	1992 DA_{12}	—	February 29, 1992	Kitt Peak	Spacewatch	·	2.6 km	MPC · JPL
32832	1992 EB_{2}	—	March 5, 1992	Kitt Peak	Spacewatch	·	6.5 km	MPC · JPL
32833	1992 EW_{2}	—	March 6, 1992	Kitt Peak	Spacewatch	·	2.5 km	MPC · JPL
32834	1992 EO_{4}	—	March 1, 1992	La Silla	UESAC	·	3.8 km	MPC · JPL
32835	1992 EO_{5}	—	March 1, 1992	La Silla	UESAC	V · slow	2.5 km	MPC · JPL
32836	1992 EC_{6}	—	March 2, 1992	La Silla	UESAC	·	2.1 km	MPC · JPL
32837	1992 EK_{7}	—	March 1, 1992	La Silla	UESAC	·	8.7 km	MPC · JPL
32838	1992 EL_{8}	—	March 2, 1992	La Silla	UESAC	V	3.1 km	MPC · JPL
32839	1992 EY_{8}	—	March 2, 1992	La Silla	UESAC	HYG	8.2 km	MPC · JPL
32840	1992 ED_{9}	—	March 2, 1992	La Silla	UESAC	·	2.3 km	MPC · JPL
32841	1992 EO_{9}	—	March 2, 1992	La Silla	UESAC	THM	14 km	MPC · JPL
32842	1992 EO_{13}	—	March 2, 1992	La Silla	UESAC	·	7.4 km	MPC · JPL
32843	1992 EC_{18}	—	March 3, 1992	La Silla	UESAC	·	3.8 km	MPC · JPL
32844	1992 EN_{25}	—	March 8, 1992	La Silla	UESAC	·	7.5 km	MPC · JPL
32845	1992 FU_{1}	—	March 26, 1992	Kushiro	S. Ueda, H. Kaneda	·	2.2 km	MPC · JPL
32846	1992 GS_{1}	—	April 5, 1992	Kitt Peak	Spacewatch	·	7.0 km	MPC · JPL
32847	1992 JO_{3}	—	May 1, 1992	La Silla	H. Debehogne	·	7.7 km	MPC · JPL
32848	1992 MD	—	June 29, 1992	Palomar	H. E. Holt	·	3.7 km	MPC · JPL
32849	1992 OO_{2}	—	July 26, 1992	La Silla	E. W. Elst	MAS	2.8 km	MPC · JPL
32850	1992 RY_{4}	—	September 2, 1992	La Silla	E. W. Elst	·	3.3 km	MPC · JPL
32851	1992 RC_{6}	—	September 2, 1992	La Silla	E. W. Elst	·	4.0 km	MPC · JPL
32852	1992 RE_{7}	—	September 2, 1992	La Silla	E. W. Elst	·	2.5 km	MPC · JPL
32853 Döbereiner	1992 SF_{2}	Döbereiner	September 21, 1992	Tautenburg Observatory	F. Börngen, L. D. Schmadel	EUN · slow	4.6 km	MPC · JPL
32854 Sekitakayuki	1992 SC_{13}	Sekitakayuki	September 30, 1992	Kitami	K. Endate, K. Watanabe	(5)	4.2 km	MPC · JPL
32855 Zollitsch	1992 SF_{17}	Zollitsch	September 24, 1992	Tautenburg Observatory	L. D. Schmadel, F. Börngen	·	5.0 km	MPC · JPL
32856	1992 SA_{25}	—	September 30, 1992	Palomar	H. E. Holt	·	4.2 km	MPC · JPL
32857	1992 UG_{6}	—	October 31, 1992	Uenohara	N. Kawasato	·	3.8 km	MPC · JPL
32858 Kitakamigawa	1993 BA_{3}	Kitakamigawa	January 25, 1993	Geisei	T. Seki	EOS	7.6 km	MPC · JPL
32859	1993 EL	—	March 15, 1993	Catalina Station	T. B. Spahr	·	4.1 km	MPC · JPL
32860	1993 FG_{5}	—	March 17, 1993	La Silla	UESAC	KOR	3.6 km	MPC · JPL
32861	1993 FM_{7}	—	March 17, 1993	La Silla	UESAC	KOR	5.1 km	MPC · JPL
32862	1993 FD_{10}	—	March 17, 1993	La Silla	UESAC	·	1.7 km	MPC · JPL
32863	1993 FP_{11}	—	March 17, 1993	La Silla	UESAC	KOR	3.6 km	MPC · JPL
32864	1993 FW_{15}	—	March 17, 1993	La Silla	UESAC	EOS	5.1 km	MPC · JPL
32865	1993 FQ_{16}	—	March 17, 1993	La Silla	UESAC	·	1.7 km	MPC · JPL
32866	1993 FW_{16}	—	March 19, 1993	La Silla	UESAC	KOR	3.1 km	MPC · JPL
32867	1993 FL_{20}	—	March 19, 1993	La Silla	UESAC	·	4.9 km	MPC · JPL
32868	1993 FM_{25}	—	March 21, 1993	La Silla	UESAC	·	5.6 km	MPC · JPL
32869	1993 FW_{26}	—	March 21, 1993	La Silla	UESAC	EOS	6.6 km	MPC · JPL
32870	1993 FD_{27}	—	March 21, 1993	La Silla	UESAC	·	2.0 km	MPC · JPL
32871	1993 FQ_{32}	—	March 21, 1993	La Silla	UESAC	KOR	4.7 km	MPC · JPL
32872	1993 FM_{36}	—	March 19, 1993	La Silla	UESAC	·	5.3 km	MPC · JPL
32873	1993 FS_{37}	—	March 19, 1993	La Silla	UESAC	KOR	3.2 km	MPC · JPL
32874	1993 FJ_{48}	—	March 19, 1993	La Silla	UESAC	KOR	3.7 km	MPC · JPL
32875	1993 FQ_{58}	—	March 19, 1993	La Silla	UESAC	·	3.9 km	MPC · JPL
32876	1993 FW_{60}	—	March 19, 1993	La Silla	UESAC	·	6.3 km	MPC · JPL
32877	1993 FU_{73}	—	March 21, 1993	La Silla	UESAC	·	2.4 km	MPC · JPL
32878	1993 NX	—	July 12, 1993	La Silla	E. W. Elst	NYS	2.7 km	MPC · JPL
32879	1993 OO_{5}	—	July 20, 1993	La Silla	E. W. Elst	·	2.1 km	MPC · JPL
32880	1993 OR_{5}	—	July 20, 1993	La Silla	E. W. Elst	THM	8.7 km	MPC · JPL
32881	1993 OK_{6}	—	July 20, 1993	La Silla	E. W. Elst	·	5.7 km	MPC · JPL
32882	1993 RW_{6}	—	September 15, 1993	La Silla	E. W. Elst	NYS	2.7 km	MPC · JPL
32883	1993 RJ_{7}	—	September 15, 1993	La Silla	E. W. Elst	NYS ·	6.0 km	MPC · JPL
32884	1993 SO_{14}	—	September 16, 1993	La Silla	H. Debehogne, E. W. Elst	·	4.3 km	MPC · JPL
32885	1993 TC_{25}	—	October 9, 1993	La Silla	E. W. Elst	NYS	2.4 km	MPC · JPL
32886	1993 TS_{26}	—	October 9, 1993	La Silla	E. W. Elst	NYS ·	4.3 km	MPC · JPL
32887	1993 TT_{26}	—	October 9, 1993	La Silla	E. W. Elst	NYS	3.2 km	MPC · JPL
32888	1993 TD_{27}	—	October 9, 1993	La Silla	E. W. Elst	NYS	3.3 km	MPC · JPL
32889	1993 TN_{29}	—	October 9, 1993	La Silla	E. W. Elst	·	2.3 km	MPC · JPL
32890 Schwob	1994 AL_{1}	Schwob	January 8, 1994	Palomar	C. S. Shoemaker, D. H. Levy	H	1.7 km	MPC · JPL
32891 Amatrice	1994 CE_{1}	Amatrice	February 9, 1994	Colleverde	V. S. Casulli	EUN	4.4 km	MPC · JPL
32892 Prufrock	1994 DW	Prufrock	February 22, 1994	La Palma	A. A. Kaas	EOS	5.4 km	MPC · JPL
32893 van der Waals	1994 EM_{6}	van der Waals	March 9, 1994	Caussols	E. W. Elst	WAT	7.0 km	MPC · JPL
32894	1994 JK_{3}	—	May 3, 1994	Kitt Peak	Spacewatch	·	3.4 km	MPC · JPL
32895	1994 JL_{5}	—	May 4, 1994	Kitt Peak	Spacewatch	·	4.6 km	MPC · JPL
32896	1994 NM_{2}	—	July 12, 1994	Catalina Station	T. B. Spahr	·	6.5 km	MPC · JPL
32897 Curtharris	1994 PD	Curtharris	August 1, 1994	Palomar	C. S. Shoemaker, D. H. Levy	·	4.1 km	MPC · JPL
32898	1994 PS_{1}	—	August 9, 1994	Palomar	E. F. Helin	·	5.0 km	MPC · JPL
32899 Knigge	1994 PY_{1}	Knigge	August 4, 1994	Tautenburg Observatory	F. Börngen	·	12 km	MPC · JPL
32900	1994 PG_{5}	—	August 10, 1994	La Silla	E. W. Elst	·	5.6 km	MPC · JPL

== 32901–33000 ==
back to top

Designation			Discovery			Properties		Ref
Permanent	Provisional	Named after	Date	Site	Discoverer(s)	Category	Diam.	Ref
32901	1994 PB_{9}	—	August 10, 1994	La Silla	E. W. Elst	·	9.5 km	MPC · JPL
32902	1994 PC_{10}	—	August 10, 1994	La Silla	E. W. Elst	·	1.2 km	MPC · JPL
32903	1994 PN_{17}	—	August 10, 1994	La Silla	E. W. Elst	·	6.3 km	MPC · JPL
32904	1994 PU_{24}	—	August 12, 1994	La Silla	E. W. Elst	THM	7.2 km	MPC · JPL
32905	1994 PX_{32}	—	August 12, 1994	La Silla	E. W. Elst	HYG	6.0 km	MPC · JPL
32906	1994 RH	—	September 2, 1994	Palomar	E. F. Helin, K. J. Lawrence	AMO +1km	2.2 km	MPC · JPL
32907	1994 RL_{2}	—	September 1, 1994	Kitt Peak	Spacewatch	·	11 km	MPC · JPL
32908	1994 SE_{2}	—	September 27, 1994	Kitt Peak	Spacewatch	·	2.7 km	MPC · JPL
32909 Uemuramahito	1994 TS	Uemuramahito	October 2, 1994	Kitami	K. Endate, K. Watanabe	·	2.3 km	MPC · JPL
32910	1994 TE_{15}	—	October 13, 1994	Kiyosato	S. Otomo	·	2.7 km	MPC · JPL
32911 Cervara	1994 VX	Cervara	November 4, 1994	Colleverde	V. S. Casulli	·	1.9 km	MPC · JPL
32912	1994 WS_{2}	—	November 30, 1994	Oizumi	T. Kobayashi	·	4.1 km	MPC · JPL
32913	1994 YV_{3}	—	December 31, 1994	Kitt Peak	Spacewatch	·	4.2 km	MPC · JPL
32914	1995 AG_{1}	—	January 6, 1995	Nyukasa	M. Hirasawa, S. Suzuki	·	4.1 km	MPC · JPL
32915	1995 BD_{2}	—	January 30, 1995	Oizumi	T. Kobayashi	NYS	2.1 km	MPC · JPL
32916	1995 CL	—	February 1, 1995	Oizumi	T. Kobayashi	·	6.3 km	MPC · JPL
32917	1995 CM	—	February 1, 1995	Oizumi	T. Kobayashi	·	1.9 km	MPC · JPL
32918	1995 CZ	—	February 3, 1995	Oizumi	T. Kobayashi	NYS ·	3.9 km	MPC · JPL
32919 Ohashi	1995 CJ_{1}	Ohashi	February 3, 1995	Kitami	K. Endate, K. Watanabe	·	3.7 km	MPC · JPL
32920	1995 CH_{2}	—	February 1, 1995	Kitt Peak	Spacewatch	NYS	2.4 km	MPC · JPL
32921	1995 EV	—	March 9, 1995	Stroncone	Santa Lucia	·	3.9 km	MPC · JPL
32922	1995 EM_{2}	—	March 1, 1995	Kitt Peak	Spacewatch	·	2.6 km	MPC · JPL
32923	1995 GF_{3}	—	April 2, 1995	Kitt Peak	Spacewatch	·	5.3 km	MPC · JPL
32924	1995 GF_{6}	—	April 6, 1995	Kitt Peak	Spacewatch	·	2.8 km	MPC · JPL
32925	1995 KF	—	May 24, 1995	Catalina Station	C. W. Hergenrother	·	2.9 km	MPC · JPL
32926	1995 ME_{1}	—	June 22, 1995	Kitt Peak	Spacewatch	·	4.3 km	MPC · JPL
32927	1995 OY_{3}	—	July 22, 1995	Kitt Peak	Spacewatch	·	2.3 km	MPC · JPL
32928 Xiejialin	1995 QZ	Xiejialin	August 20, 1995	Xinglong	SCAP	H	1.9 km	MPC · JPL
32929	1995 QY_{9}	—	August 31, 1995	Mauna Kea	D. C. Jewitt, J. Chen	plutino	66 km	MPC · JPL
32930	1995 SC_{4}	—	September 24, 1995	Church Stretton	S. P. Laurie	·	7.3 km	MPC · JPL
32931 Ferioli	1995 SY_{4}	Ferioli	September 26, 1995	Sormano	P. Sicoli, Ghezzi, P.	EMA	7.3 km	MPC · JPL
32932	1995 SX_{15}	—	September 18, 1995	Kitt Peak	Spacewatch	·	5.7 km	MPC · JPL
32933	1995 SF_{21}	—	September 19, 1995	Kitt Peak	Spacewatch	·	3.0 km	MPC · JPL
32934	1995 SP_{25}	—	September 19, 1995	Kitt Peak	Spacewatch	·	4.2 km	MPC · JPL
32935	1995 SV_{43}	—	September 25, 1995	Kitt Peak	Spacewatch	·	5.2 km	MPC · JPL
32936	1995 SA_{44}	—	September 25, 1995	Kitt Peak	Spacewatch	·	5.7 km	MPC · JPL
32937	1995 TT	—	October 13, 1995	Oizumi	T. Kobayashi	EOS	9.9 km	MPC · JPL
32938 Ivanopaci	1995 TP_{2}	Ivanopaci	October 15, 1995	San Marcello	L. Tesi, A. Boattini	·	3.7 km	MPC · JPL
32939 Nasimi	1995 UN_{2}	Nasimi	October 24, 1995	Kleť	Kleť	·	5.4 km	MPC · JPL
32940	1995 UW_{4}	—	October 26, 1995	Oizumi	T. Kobayashi	·	3.4 km	MPC · JPL
32941	1995 UY_{4}	—	October 24, 1995	Sormano	A. Testa, Ventre, G.	·	5.4 km	MPC · JPL
32942	1995 UD_{7}	—	October 27, 1995	Kushiro	S. Ueda, H. Kaneda	TIR	5.2 km	MPC · JPL
32943 Sandyryan	1995 VK_{2}	Sandyryan	November 13, 1995	Haleakala	AMOS	EOS	5.7 km	MPC · JPL
32944 Gussalli	1995 WC_{3}	Gussalli	November 19, 1995	Sormano	P. Sicoli, F. Manca	·	8.4 km	MPC · JPL
32945 Lecce	1995 WR_{5}	Lecce	November 24, 1995	Colleverde	V. S. Casulli	·	5.0 km	MPC · JPL
32946	1995 WZ_{17}	—	November 17, 1995	Kitt Peak	Spacewatch	·	6.1 km	MPC · JPL
32947	1995 YH_{2}	—	December 23, 1995	Sudbury	D. di Cicco	·	4.3 km	MPC · JPL
32948	1995 YA_{6}	—	December 16, 1995	Kitt Peak	Spacewatch	·	7.0 km	MPC · JPL
32949	1996 AR_{3}	—	January 14, 1996	Haleakala	AMOS	THM	5.8 km	MPC · JPL
32950	1996 CA_{1}	—	February 10, 1996	Xinglong	SCAP	EUP	12 km	MPC · JPL
32951	1996 FA_{2}	—	March 20, 1996	Haleakala	NEAT	·	1.7 km	MPC · JPL
32952	1996 FA_{16}	—	March 22, 1996	La Silla	E. W. Elst	·	2.5 km	MPC · JPL
32953	1996 GF_{19}	—	April 15, 1996	La Silla	E. W. Elst	V	2.4 km	MPC · JPL
32954	1996 GP_{20}	—	April 15, 1996	La Silla	E. W. Elst	·	3.8 km	MPC · JPL
32955	1996 HC_{2}	—	April 24, 1996	Moriyama	Ikari, Y.	·	2.0 km	MPC · JPL
32956	1996 HR_{18}	—	April 18, 1996	La Silla	E. W. Elst	NYS ·	4.7 km	MPC · JPL
32957	1996 HX_{20}	—	April 18, 1996	La Silla	E. W. Elst	V	1.3 km	MPC · JPL
32958	1996 HU_{24}	—	April 20, 1996	La Silla	E. W. Elst	V	1.7 km	MPC · JPL
32959	1996 HB_{25}	—	April 20, 1996	La Silla	E. W. Elst	(5)	3.8 km	MPC · JPL
32960	1996 NO_{4}	—	July 14, 1996	La Silla	E. W. Elst	EUN	2.8 km	MPC · JPL
32961	1996 PS	—	August 9, 1996	Haleakala	NEAT	·	2.3 km	MPC · JPL
32962	1996 PH_{1}	—	August 11, 1996	Rand	G. R. Viscome	·	2.8 km	MPC · JPL
32963	1996 PJ_{1}	—	August 11, 1996	Rand	G. R. Viscome	·	2.2 km	MPC · JPL
32964	1996 PS_{3}	—	August 9, 1996	Haleakala	NEAT	NYS	2.0 km	MPC · JPL
32965	1996 PX_{4}	—	August 15, 1996	Haleakala	NEAT	·	6.4 km	MPC · JPL
32966	1996 PE_{5}	—	August 15, 1996	Rand	G. R. Viscome	·	3.3 km	MPC · JPL
32967	1996 PG_{7}	—	August 8, 1996	La Silla	E. W. Elst	slow	4.8 km	MPC · JPL
32968	1996 PK_{8}	—	August 8, 1996	La Silla	E. W. Elst	NYS	3.2 km	MPC · JPL
32969 Motohikosato	1996 PP_{9}	Motohikosato	August 6, 1996	Nanyo	T. Okuni	·	4.7 km	MPC · JPL
32970	1996 QX	—	August 19, 1996	Kleť	Kleť	·	1.9 km	MPC · JPL
32971	1996 RQ_{10}	—	September 8, 1996	Kitt Peak	Spacewatch	·	2.4 km	MPC · JPL
32972	1996 SB_{2}	—	September 17, 1996	Kitt Peak	Spacewatch	·	5.7 km	MPC · JPL
32973	1996 TN_{11}	—	October 11, 1996	Kitami	K. Endate	·	4.2 km	MPC · JPL
32974	1996 TX_{16}	—	October 4, 1996	Kitt Peak	Spacewatch	EOS	5.9 km	MPC · JPL
32975	1996 TR_{23}	—	October 6, 1996	Kitt Peak	Spacewatch	·	4.9 km	MPC · JPL
32976	1996 VK	—	November 3, 1996	Oohira	T. Urata	·	4.7 km	MPC · JPL
32977	1996 VR_{4}	—	November 13, 1996	Oizumi	T. Kobayashi	RAF	4.6 km	MPC · JPL
32978	1996 VG_{7}	—	November 9, 1996	Xinglong	SCAP	·	7.4 km	MPC · JPL
32979	1996 VH_{7}	—	November 9, 1996	Xinglong	SCAP	·	6.1 km	MPC · JPL
32980	1996 VH_{25}	—	November 10, 1996	Kitt Peak	Spacewatch	·	6.1 km	MPC · JPL
32981	1996 VO_{27}	—	November 11, 1996	Kitt Peak	Spacewatch	THM	7.4 km	MPC · JPL
32982	1996 VD_{38}	—	November 2, 1996	Xinglong	SCAP	·	4.4 km	MPC · JPL
32983	1996 WU_{2}	—	November 27, 1996	Xinglong	SCAP	EUN	5.8 km	MPC · JPL
32984	1996 XX	—	December 1, 1996	Chichibu	N. Satō	MAR	3.0 km	MPC · JPL
32985	1996 XN_{3}	—	December 1, 1996	Kitt Peak	Spacewatch	·	3.5 km	MPC · JPL
32986	1996 XQ_{6}	—	December 1, 1996	Kitt Peak	Spacewatch	MAR	5.1 km	MPC · JPL
32987 Uyuni	1996 XB_{9}	Uyuni	December 4, 1996	Colleverde	V. S. Casulli	MAR	3.5 km	MPC · JPL
32988	1996 XK_{19}	—	December 8, 1996	Oizumi	T. Kobayashi	EOS	6.7 km	MPC · JPL
32989	1996 XA_{24}	—	December 5, 1996	Kitt Peak	Spacewatch	·	5.9 km	MPC · JPL
32990 Sayo-hime	1996 YD_{3}	Sayo-hime	December 30, 1996	Chichibu	N. Satō	EOS	7.9 km	MPC · JPL
32991	1997 AC_{3}	—	January 4, 1997	Oizumi	T. Kobayashi	·	5.2 km	MPC · JPL
32992	1997 AN_{3}	—	January 3, 1997	Kitt Peak	Spacewatch	KOR	2.8 km	MPC · JPL
32993	1997 AX_{6}	—	January 9, 1997	Oizumi	T. Kobayashi	·	8.2 km	MPC · JPL
32994	1997 AT_{21}	—	January 11, 1997	Xinglong	SCAP	·	6.2 km	MPC · JPL
32995	1997 BS_{1}	—	January 29, 1997	Oizumi	T. Kobayashi	EOS	4.8 km	MPC · JPL
32996	1997 CV	—	February 1, 1997	Oizumi	T. Kobayashi	·	4.3 km	MPC · JPL
32997	1997 CG_{3}	—	February 3, 1997	Haleakala	NEAT	·	7.3 km	MPC · JPL
32998	1997 CK_{5}	—	February 1, 1997	Chichibu	N. Satō	·	3.9 km	MPC · JPL
32999	1997 CY_{27}	—	February 6, 1997	Xinglong	SCAP	·	16 km	MPC · JPL
33000 Chenjiansheng	1997 CJ_{28}	Chenjiansheng	February 11, 1997	Xinglong	SCAP	·	5.8 km	MPC · JPL

back to top

== See also ==
- Meanings of minor-planet names: 32001–33000
