= 32145 Katberman =

Main-belt asteroid

Discovery
- Discovered by: LINEAR
- Discovery site: Lincoln Lab's ETS
- Discovery date: 7 June 2000

Designations
- Named after: Katharine B. Berman (2016 Intel STS awardee)
- Alternative designations: 2000 LE_{30} · 1996 MV; 1998 YL_{15} · 1999 AL_{37}
- Minor planet category: main-belt · (inner)

Orbital characteristics
- Epoch 4 September 2017 (JD 2458000.5)
- Uncertainty parameter 0
- Observation arc: 20.76 yr (7,582 days)
- Aphelion: 2.8399 AU
- Perihelion: 1.9889 AU
- Semi-major axis: 2.4144 AU
- Eccentricity: 0.1762
- Orbital period (sidereal): 3.75 yr (1,370 days)
- Mean anomaly: 236.95°
- Mean motion: 0° 15^{m} 45.72^{s} / day
- Inclination: 9.0211°
- Longitude of ascending node: 105.91°
- Argument of perihelion: 139.73°

Physical characteristics
- Dimensions: 2.91 km (calculated); 4.411±0.775 km
- Synodic rotation period: 9.1292±0.0095 h 9.140±0.090 h 9.1695±0.0095 h
- Geometric albedo: 0.1578±0.0624; 0.158±0.062; 0.20 (assumed)
- Spectral type: S
- Absolute magnitude (H): 14.4 · 14.578±0.005 (R) · 14.6 · 14.670±0.250 (R) · 14.68±0.22 · 15.04

32145 Katberman (provisional designation 2000 LE_{30}) is a stony asteroid from the inner regions of the asteroid belt, approximately 4 kilometers in diameter. The asteroid was discovered on 7 June 2000, by the LINEAR team at Lincoln Laboratory's Experimental Test Site in Socorro, New Mexico, United States. It was named for Katharine Berman, a 2016 Intel STS awardee.

== Orbit and classification ==
Katberman orbits the Sun in the inner main-belt at a distance of 2.0–2.8 AU once every 3 years and 9 months (1,370 days). Its orbit has an eccentricity of 0.18 and an inclination of 9° with respect to the ecliptic.

The asteroid's observation arc begins 4 years prior to its official discovery observation, with a precovery taken by the Steward Observatory's Spacewatch survey at Kitt Peak in June 1996.

== Physical characteristics ==
=== Diameter and albedo ===
According to the survey carried out by the NEOWISE mission of NASA's space-based Wide-field Infrared Survey Explorer, Katberman measures 4.4 kilometers in diameter and its surface has an albedo of 0.16, while the Collaborative Asteroid Lightcurve Link assumes a standard albedo for a stony asteroid of 0.20 and calculates a diameter of 2.9 kilometers with an absolute magnitude of 15.04.

=== Rotation period ===
In October 2012, and January 2014, three rotational lightcurves of Katberman were obtained from photometric observations at the Palomar Transient Factory in California. Lightcurve analysis gave a rotation period of 9.14, 9.17 and 9.13 hours, respectively, with a corresponding brightness variation of 0.85, 0.80 and 0.70 in magnitude (U=2/2/2).

== Naming ==
This minor planet was named after Katharine Barr Berman (born 1998) awardee in the Intel Science Talent Search of 2016. She was a finalist for her cellular and molecular biology project. At the time, she attended the U.S. Hastings High School in New York. The official naming citation was published by the Minor Planet Center on 21 May 2016 (M.P.C. 100315).
