= 32226 Vikulgupta =

Stony Flora asteroid from the inner regions of the asteroid belt

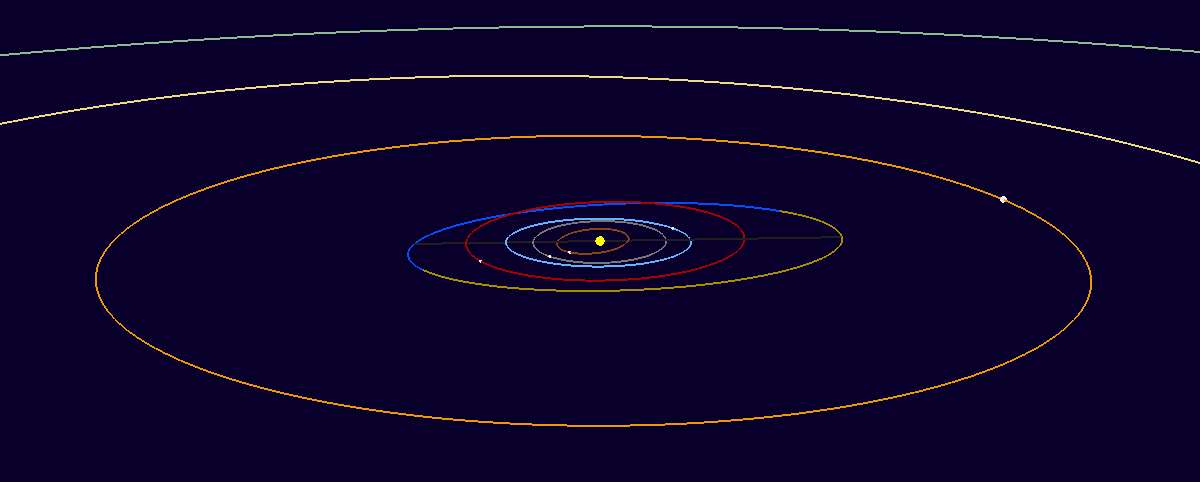
- Yellow-Blue orbit is of 32226 Vikulgupta.

Discovery
- Discovered by: LINEAR
- Discovery site: Lincoln Lab's ETS
- Discovery date: 23 July 2000

Designations
- Named after: Vikul Gupta (2016 Intel STS awardee)
- Alternative designations: 2000 OQ_{23} · 1999 CY_{85}
- Minor planet category: main-belt · Flora

Orbital characteristics
- Epoch 4 September 2017 (JD 2458000.5)
- Uncertainty parameter 0
- Observation arc: 19.56 yr (7,143 days)
- Aphelion: 2.5878 AU
- Perihelion: 2.0633 AU
- Semi-major axis: 2.3256 AU
- Eccentricity: 0.1128
- Orbital period (sidereal): 3.55 yr (1,295 days)
- Mean anomaly: 322.00°
- Mean motion: 0° 16^{m} 40.44^{s} / day
- Inclination: 4.2004°
- Longitude of ascending node: 302.69°
- Argument of perihelion: 320.95°

Physical characteristics
- Dimensions: 3.11 km (calculated); 3.776±0.134 km
- Synodic rotation period: 2.57±0.05 h 2.5724±0.0006 h
- Geometric albedo: 0.215±0.036; 0.2153±0.0356; 0.24 (assumed)
- Spectral type: S
- Absolute magnitude (H): 14.4 · 14.55±0.16 (R) · 14.613±0.005 (R) · 14.7 · 15.33±0.43

32226 Vikulgupta (provisional designation 2000 OQ_{23}) is a stony Flora asteroid from the inner regions of the asteroid belt, approximately 3.5 kilometers in diameter.

The asteroid was discovered on 23 July 2000, by the LINEAR team at Lincoln Laboratory's Experimental Test Site near Socorro, New Mexico, in the United States. It was named for Vikul Gupta, a 2016 Intel STS awardee.

== Orbit and classification ==
Vikulgupta is a member of the Flora family, one of the largest groups of stony asteroids in the main-belt. It orbits the Sun in the inner main-belt at a distance of 2.1–2.6 AU once every 3 years and 7 months (1,295 days). Its orbit has an eccentricity of 0.11 and an inclination of 4° with respect to the ecliptic.

A first precovery was taken at Whipple Observatory in 1997, extending the asteroid's observation arc by 3 years prior to its official discovery observation at Socorro.

== Physical characteristics ==
=== Rotation period ===
In February 2013, two rotational lightcurves of Vikulgupta were obtained from photometric observations at the Palomar Transient Factory in California. Lightcurve analysis gave a rotation period of 2.57 and 2.5724 hours with a brightness variation of 0.35 and 0.34 magnitude, respectively (U=2/2).

=== Diameter and albedo ===
According to the survey carried out by the NEOWISE mission of NASA's space-based Wide-field Infrared Survey Explorer, Vikulgupta measures 3.8 kilometers in diameter and its surface has an albedo of 0.215, while the Collaborative Asteroid Lightcurve Link assumes an albedo of 0.24 – derived from 8 Flora, the largest member and namesake of its orbital family – and calculates a diameter of 3.1 kilometers with an absolute magnitude of 14.7.

== Naming ==
This minor planet was named after Vikul Gupta (born 1998), a science competition finalist in the 2016 Intel Science Talent Search, who was awarded for his computer science project. At the time, he attended the U.S. Oregon Episcopal School in Portland. The approved naming citation was published by the Minor Planet Center on 21 May 2016 (M.P.C. 100315).
