= Xu Guangxian =

Chinese chemist and acadmeic (1920–2015)

- 徐光宪
- Born: November 7, 1920; Shaoxing, Zhejiang, China
- Died: April 28, 2015 (aged 94); Beijing, China
- Education: Zhejiang University of Technology; Shanghai Jiaotong University; Washington University in St. Louis; Columbia University
- Known for: "The Father of Chinese Rare Earths Chemistry"
- Spouse: Gao Xiaoxia (m. 1946–1998)
- Scientific career
- Fields: Rare earths

Chinese name
- Traditional Chinese: 徐光憲
- Simplified Chinese: 徐光宪
Transcriptions
Standard Mandarin
- Hanyu Pinyin: Xú Guāngxiàn
- Wade–Giles: Hsü Kuang-hsien

Xu Guangxian (Chinese: 徐光宪; November 7, 1920 – April 28, 2015), also known as Kwang-hsien Hsu, was a Chinese chemist and professor at Peking University. He was an academician of the Chinese Academy of Sciences who is respected for his contributions in both theoretical and experimental chemistry. He is a former president of the Chinese Chemical Society, and is known as "The Father of Chinese Rare Earths Chemistry".

== Early life and education ==
Xu was born in Shaoxing, Zhejiang on November 7, 1920. He entered Hangzhou Advanced Industrial Vocational School in Zhejiang (now part of Zhejiang University of Technology). Due to the Second Sino-Japanese War, the students and faculty were relocated to an advanced industrial school in Ningbo, where Xu graduated in 1939.

In 1940 Xu entered Jiaotong University in Shanghai (now known as Shanghai Jiao Tong University, SJTU). Again, there was disruption at the university because of the war. Xu received his B.Sc. in 1944. In 1945, Xu Guangxian worked as a teaching assistant at SJTU, with professor Gu Jidong. He married one of his classmates, chemist Gao Xiaoxia in 1946.

Xu and Gao passed national examinations for studying abroad in 1946. Xu traveled to the United States in 1948 to attend the graduate school of Washington University in St. Louis. After ranking first in a probationary summer class at Columbia University in New York City, he was able to transfer to Columbia. There he studied quantum chemistry with a minor in physics from 1948 to 1951. He also worked as a teaching assistant, enabling Gao Xiaoxia to join him and study analytical chemistry at New York University.

Xu received his MS in 1949 and his PhD in 1951 working with Charles O. Beckmann. His thesis in quantum chemistry was "Optically Active Quantum Chemical Theory". In February 1949, he became a member of the Phi Lambda Upsilon National Honorary Chemical Society (ΦΛΥ). In October 1950, Xu became a member of Sigma Xi (ΣΞ).

Meanwhile, in China, the Chinese Civil War resulted in the formation of the People's Republic of China in 1949. The Korean War broke out in June, 1950. Soon after, the United States government passed an act forbidding Chinese citizens who were studying in America from returning to China. Concerned that they might not be allowed to return home if they waited until Gao Xiaoxia received her Ph.D., Xu Guangxian and Gao Xiaoxia applied for short-term visas to China. On April 15, 1951, they left for China on the USS General Gordon, one of the last three cruisers to leave for China before the American ban went into effect.

== Career ==
After returning to China in 1951, Xu became an associate professor at the Department of Chemistry of Peking University. By autumn 1952, he held professorships in both the Department of Chemistry and the Department of Technical Physics. Xu held various directorships at the university. He worked primarily in the areas of quantum chemistry and chemical bonding theory. He studied the bonding characteristics of molecules and proposed a formula relating the order of filling of atomic orbital levels to the grouping of elements into periods in the periodic table. This led to greater understanding of the lanthanides and actinides.

Xu became the department dean in 1956 and directed the department of radiation chemistry. Xu was involved in the Chinese nuclear weapons development program, in which he played a role in separating and extracting elements for nuclear fuels. In particular, he did experimental research on the separation of Uranium-235 and Uranium-238. After 1966, when the Cultural Revolution began, Xu's department stopped doing atomic research.

During the Cultural Revolution, Xu and his wife Gao Xiaoxia were accused of spying for the Kuomintang and sent to a labor camp from 1969 to 1972.

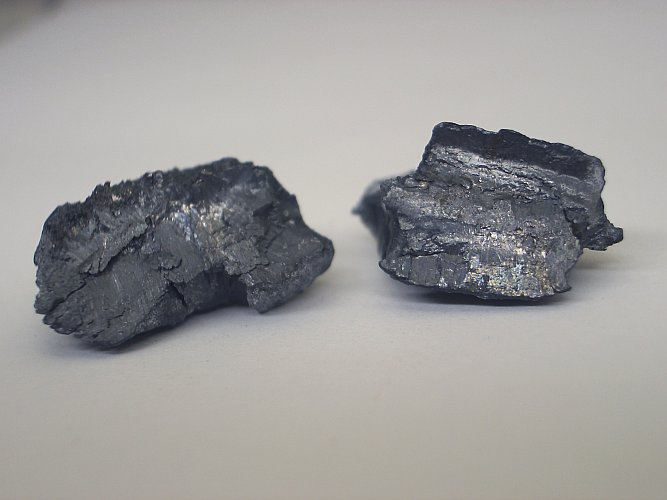
The element praseodymium

When he returned to Peking University in 1972, Xu was asked to change his field of study to the extraction of praseodymium, a rare earth element. During the 1970s, Xu studied the theoretical basis and design for solvent extraction, developed mathematical models, and made important contributions towards the development of separation processes for rare earth elements. Gao Xiaoxia's development of microanalytical techniques in polarography contributed to the success of Xu's research. Xu developed the process of countercurrent extraction (also known as series extraction or cascade extraction) and substantially reduced both the time needed to extract materials, and their resulting cost.

Xu founded the Research Center of Rare Earth Chemistry as of 1986 and was essential in establishing the State Key Laboratory of Rare Earth Materials Chemistry and Applications in 1989. He served as director and as chairman of its academic committee.

In 2005, Xu Guangxian raised concerns about the mining of thorium in the Baotou area, where mine wastes were released into the Yellow River. The Yellow River is a source of drinking water for an estimated 150 million people, so radioactive contamination is a very serious issue. Xu has suggested that the Chinese develop stocks of rare earths to stave off shortages of rare earths.

Xu published more than 500 reviewed papers and several books. These included Principle of Extraction Chemistry, Rare Earth Solvent Extraction, The Structure of Matter and The Basic Principles of Quantum Chemistry and Ab-initio Calculation. Xu has supervised hundreds of students.

== Awards and honors ==
- Xu has twice received China's State Natural Science Award (Second Class and Third Class, 1987); twice received the State Science and Technology Progress Award (Second Class, 1998; Third Class, 1991); and received the Ho Leung Ho Lee Prize for Scientific and Technological Progress in 1994.
- Xu received the 2008 State Preeminent Science and Technology Award. It was presented to him at the Great Hall of the People in Beijing, on January 9, 2009, by Hu Jintao. Xu was also congratulated by Wen Jiabao. The award is considered to be China's equivalent to the Nobel Prize.
- In 2009, Xu Guangxian, Qian Xuesen, Zhang Guangdou, and Wu Wenjun were honored with the inaugural SJTU Outstanding Alumni Lifetime Achievement Award from Shanghai Jiao Tong University.
- Asteroid 345871 Xuguangxian, discovered by astronomers with the PMO NEO Survey Program at Purple Mountain Observatory in 2007, was named in his memory. The official naming citation was published by the Minor Planet Center on January 9, 2020 (M.P.C. 120070).

Xu died in Beijing on April 28, 2015, at age 94.

== Memberships ==
- Elected to the Chinese Academy of Sciences in 1980
- President (1986―1990), Chinese Chemical Society (CCS)
- Vice-president (1980―1999), Chinese Society of Rare Earths (CSRE) Honorary vice-president thereafter
- Editor-in-chief, Rare Earths (a 3-volume monograph on the science and technology of rare earths in China), Metallurgical Industry Press, Beijing, 1995
- Editor-in-chief, Journal of Rare Earths

== See also ==
- Project 596 – China's first nuclear weapons test.
