= Gao Xiaoxia =

Chinese chemist

- 高小霞
- Born: 1919; Xiaoshan, Zhejiang, China
- Died: 9 September 1998 (aged 78–79); Beijing, China
- Education: Shanghai Jiao Tong University, New York University
- Spouse: Xu Guangxian (m. 1946–1998)
- Scientific career
- Fields: Rare earths

Gao Xiaoxia (Chinese: 高小霞; pinyin: Gāo Xiǎoxiá; 1919 – 9 September 1998) was a Chinese chemist and an academician of the Chinese Academy of Sciences. She held leadership positions at Peking University and in the Chinese Chemical Society. Her contributions to analytical chemistry, particularly the development of microanalytical techniques in polarography, were instrumental in supporting the research and production of rare earths.

== Early life and education ==
Gao was born in Xiaoshan, Zhejiang, in 1919. In 1944 she graduated from Jiaotong University in Shanghai, with a BSc in chemistry. She was the only woman in the class to earn a degree. While she was a student the chemistry laboratory was in an abandoned factory in the French Concession, because of the Second Sino-Japanese War. Gao was a classmate of chemist Xu Guangxian, whom she married in 1946.

Gao and Xu passed national examinations for studying abroad in 1946. Xu traveled to the United States in 1948 where he attended graduate school at Washington University in St. Louis and Columbia University. He also worked as a teaching assistant, enabling Gao to join him and study analytical chemistry at New York University.

At NYU, Gao worked with Anton Benedetti-Pichler, an "extraordinarily ingenious" developer of microanalytical techniques. Gao received her master's degree in analytical chemistry from NYU in 1950 and continued to work towards her PhD.

Meanwhile, the Chinese Civil War resulted in the victory of the Communist Party in 1949. The Korean War broke out in June 1950. Soon after, the United States government proposed legislation to ban Chinese students from returning to China. Concerned that they might not be allowed to return home if they waited until she received her degree, Gao and her husband applied for short-term visas to China. On 15 April 1951, they left aboard the General Gordon, one of the last three passenger ships to leave for China before the ban.

== Career ==
After returning to China in May 1951, Gao joined the Department of Chemistry (later the Institute of Analytical Chemistry) of Peking University. Initially a lecturer, she rose to assistant and full professor, and served three terms as the Director of Analytical Chemistry.

In 1966, the Cultural Revolution began. Many academics were persecuted and killed. Gao and her husband were accused of spying for the former Kuomintang government and sent to a labor camp in 1969; they were released and returned to Peking University in 1972.

Gao focused on instrumentation, developing tools and methods in polarography and applying them to the detection of trace elements. She was particularly interested in platinum group elements and rare earths. Her work led to greater understanding of the lanthanides and actinides. Her work supported the development of separation processes for rare earth elements, introduced by her husband, which reduced the time and cost of extracting such materials. She also helped to develop China's first monitoring station for the measurement of air pollution.

Gao was active in the Chinese Chemical Society between 1978 and 1990. She held various leadership positions including being the Director of the Popular Science Committee and the Deputy Director of the Committee of Analytical Chemistry. She was elected to the Chinese Academy of Sciences in 1980.

Gao published both papers and books, including Introduction to Electroanalytical Chemistry (1986) and Rare Earth agricultural and electroanalytical chemistry (1997). Her students include the first two Chinese to defend PhD theses in chemistry in mainland China: Zhang Manping and Jiao Kui.
