= Meanings of minor-planet names: 345001–346000 =

As minor planet discoveries are confirmed, they are given a permanent number by the IAU's Minor Planet Center (MPC), and the discoverers can then submit names for them, following the IAU's naming conventions. The list below concerns those minor planets in the specified number-range that have received names, and explains the meanings of those names.

Official naming citations of newly named small Solar System bodies are approved and published in a bulletin by IAU's Working Group for Small Bodies Nomenclature (WGSBN). Before May 2021, citations were published in MPC's Minor Planet Circulars for many decades. Recent citations can also be found on the JPL Small-Body Database (SBDB). Until his death in 2016, German astronomer Lutz D. Schmadel compiled these citations into the Dictionary of Minor Planet Names (DMP) and regularly updated the collection.

Based on Paul Herget's The Names of the Minor Planets, Schmadel also researched the unclear origin of numerous asteroids, most of which had been named prior to World War II. This article incorporates text from this source, which is in the public domain: SBDB New namings may only be added to this list below after official publication as the preannouncement of names is condemned. The WGSBN publishes a comprehensive guideline for the naming rules of non-cometary small Solar System bodies.

== 345001–345100 ==
Named minor planet	Provisional	This minor planet was named for...	Ref · Catalog
There are no named minor planets in this number range

== 345101–345200 ==
back to top

Named minor planet	Provisional	This minor planet was named for...	Ref · Catalog
There are no named minor planets in this number range

== 345201–345300 ==
back to top

Named minor planet	Provisional	This minor planet was named for...	Ref · Catalog
There are no named minor planets in this number range

== 345301–345400 ==
back to top

Named minor planet	Provisional	This minor planet was named for...	Ref · Catalog
There are no named minor planets in this number range

== 345401–345500 ==
back to top

Named minor planet	Provisional	This minor planet was named for...	Ref · Catalog
There are no named minor planets in this number range

== 345501–345600 ==
back to top

Named minor planet	Provisional	This minor planet was named for...	Ref · Catalog
345574 Michael	2006 RN_{117}	Michael P. JasonSmith, New Zealander computer scientist and software engineer.	IAU · 345574

== 345601–345700 ==
back to top

Named minor planet	Provisional	This minor planet was named for...	Ref · Catalog
345648 Adyendre	2006 TZ_{6}	Endre Ady (1877–1919) was a poet, journalist, short story writer, and one of Hungary's greatest lyric poets. He is best known for his daring works celebrating love, but he also wrote religious and revolutionary poems. His expression was radical in form, language and content.	IAU · 345648

== 345701–345800 ==
back to top

Named minor planet	Provisional	This minor planet was named for...	Ref · Catalog
345720 Monte Vigese	2006 XC_{44}	Monte Vigese is a 1091-m mountain in the Bolognese Apennines in Italy. The name derives from Vigo, a village perched on its slopes.	IAU · 345720
345762 Jacquescœur	2007 EA_{88}	Jacques Cœur (c. 1395–1456), was a French merchant and government official, who initiated regular trade routes between France and the Levant (Eastern Mediterranean).	IAU · 345762
345763 Pompiere	2007 EQ_{88}	The Corpo dei Pompieri, established by royal decree in 1935, is today called Corpo Nazionale dei Vigili del Fuoco. The word Pompiere comes from "pump", the main and characteristic device used by them.	IAU · 345763

== 345801–345900 ==
back to top

Named minor planet	Provisional	This minor planet was named for...	Ref · Catalog
345842 Alexparker	2007 LG_{31}	Alex H. Parker (born 1987), an American astronomer and co-discoverer of minor planets (uncredited as of 2017)	JPL · 345842
345868 Halicarnassus	2007 QE_{2}	The Mausoleum at Halicarnassus, built 353-350 BCE, was the tomb of Mausolus, a governor in the Achaemenid Empire. It was one of the seven wonders of the ancient world.	IAU · 345868
345871 Xuguangxian	2007 QR_{6}	Xu Guangxian (1920–2015), an academician of the Chinese Academy of Science, developed the theory of counter-current cascade extraction, which is widely used in rare-earth separation. (Xu Guangxian is also known as Kwang-hsien Hsu.)	JPL · 345871

== 345901–346000 ==
back to top

Named minor planet	Provisional	This minor planet was named for...	Ref · Catalog
345959 Dafeng	2007 SA_{23}	Dafeng, a coastal district under the administration of Yancheng, Jiangsu province, China.	IAU · 345959
345971 Marktorrence	2007 TG_{105}	Mark H. Torrence (born 1952), an American planetary scientist and contributor to several NASA missions	JPL · 345971
345972 Rufin	2007 TM_{105}	Jean-Christophe Rufin (born 1952) is a French doctor, diplomat, historian, globetrotter and novelist. He is the president of Action Against Hunger, was one of the earliest members of Médecins Sans Frontières, and is a member of the Académie Française.	IAU · 345972

back to top

Preceded by 344,001–345,000	Meanings of minor-planet names List of minor planets: 345,001–346,000	Succeeded by 346,001–347,000
