= Meanings of minor-planet names: 346001–347000 =

As minor planet discoveries are confirmed, they are given a permanent number by the IAU's Minor Planet Center (MPC), and the discoverers can then submit names for them, following the IAU's naming conventions. The list below concerns those minor planets in the specified number-range that have received names, and explains the meanings of those names.

Official naming citations of newly named small Solar System bodies are approved and published in a bulletin by IAU's Working Group for Small Bodies Nomenclature (WGSBN). Before May 2021, citations were published in MPC's Minor Planet Circulars for many decades. Recent citations can also be found on the JPL Small-Body Database (SBDB). Until his death in 2016, German astronomer Lutz D. Schmadel compiled these citations into the Dictionary of Minor Planet Names (DMP) and regularly updated the collection.

Based on Paul Herget's The Names of the Minor Planets, Schmadel also researched the unclear origin of numerous asteroids, most of which had been named prior to World War II. This article incorporates text from this source, which is in the public domain: SBDB New namings may only be added to this list below after official publication as the preannouncement of names is condemned. The WGSBN publishes a comprehensive guideline for the naming rules of non-cometary small Solar System bodies.

== 346001–346100 ==
Named minor planet	Provisional	This minor planet was named for...	Ref · Catalog
There are no named minor planets in this number range

== 346101–346200 ==
back to top

Named minor planet	Provisional	This minor planet was named for...	Ref · Catalog
346150 Nanyi	2007 VE_{253}	Nanyi is the Chinese abbreviation of Nanjing Medical University, which was founded in 1934 and is one of the birthplaces of public health education in modern China.	IAU · 346150

== 346201–346300 ==
back to top

Named minor planet	Provisional	This minor planet was named for...	Ref · Catalog
346261 Alexandrescu	2008 EK_{145}	Harald Alexandrescu (1945–2005), a Romanian astronomer.	JPL · 346261

== 346301–346400 ==
back to top

Named minor planet	Provisional	This minor planet was named for...	Ref · Catalog
346318 Elektrėnai	2008 QX_{32}	Elektrenai, a city in Vilnius County, Lithuania.	IAU · 346318

== 346401–346500 ==
back to top

Named minor planet	Provisional	This minor planet was named for...	Ref · Catalog
346471 Sleeperhennig	2008 TA_{160}	Melissa Sleeper (b. 1957) is an American elementary teacher and Lee Ann Hennig (b. 1946) is an American high-school astronomy teacher. Both women have inspired and encouraged many students to become scientists.	IAU · 346471

== 346501–346600 ==
back to top

Named minor planet	Provisional	This minor planet was named for...	Ref · Catalog
There are no named minor planets in this number range

== 346601–346700 ==
back to top

Named minor planet	Provisional	This minor planet was named for...	Ref · Catalog
346666 Knorozov	2008 YK_{22}	Yuri Valentinovich Knorozov, Russian linguist.	IAU · 346666

== 346701–346800 ==
back to top

Named minor planet	Provisional	This minor planet was named for...	Ref · Catalog
346721 Panchengdong	2009 AP_{15}	Chengdong Pan (1934–1997), Chinese mathematician of number theory.	IAU · 346721

== 346801–346900 ==
back to top

Named minor planet	Provisional	This minor planet was named for...	Ref · Catalog
346810 Giancabattisti	2009 CD_{40}	Giancarlo Battisti (born 1942) is a very enthusiastic Italian amateur astronomer. He is the author of the graphical Atlas of Galaxies (2008).	IAU · 346810
346886 Middelburg	2009 MB	Middelburg is an old Dutch city on the isle of Walcheren in the province of Zeeland that was built as a fortress against the Vikings.	JPL · 346886
346889 Rhiphonos	2009 QV_{38}	Riphonus (Rhiphonos), one of the commanders of the Lamian centaurs in Greek mythology. He is one of the twelve rustic spirits of the Lamos river set by Zeus to guard the infant Dionysos. Later, Riphonus joined Dionysus in his campaign against India.	JPL · 346889

== 346901–347000 ==
back to top

Named minor planet	Provisional	This minor planet was named for...	Ref · Catalog
346998 Wakamura	2010 CR_{182}	Cori Wakamura (b. 1977), a Fiscal Specialist at the Institute for Astronomy of the University of Hawaiʻi.	IAU · 346998
346999 Evalilly	2010 CQ_{183}	Eva Lilly (b. 1982), a Slovak-American astronomer. She earned her PhD in astronomy at Comenius University in Bratislava.	IAU · 346999

back to top

Preceded by 345,001–346,000	Meanings of minor-planet names List of minor planets: 346,001–347,000	Succeeded by 347,001–348,000
