= List of minor planets: 345001–346000 =

The following is a partial list of minor planets, running from minor-planet number 345001 through 346000, inclusive. The primary data for this and other partial lists is based on JPL's "Small-Body Orbital Elements" and data available from the Minor Planet Center. Critical list information is also provided by the MPC, unless otherwise specified from Lowell Observatory. A detailed description of the table's columns and additional sources are given on the main page including a complete list of every page in this series, and a statistical break-up on the dynamical classification of minor planets.

Also see the summary list of all named bodies in numerical and alphabetical order, and the corresponding naming citations for the number range of this particular list. New namings may only be added to this list after official publication, as the preannouncement of names is condemned by the Working Group for Small Bodies Nomenclature of the International Astronomical Union.

Near-Earth obj.	MBA (inner)	MBA (outer)	Centaur
Mars-crosser	MBA (middle)	Jupiter trojan	Trans-Neptunian obj.
Unclassified

== 345001–345100 ==
Designation			Discovery			Properties		Ref
Permanent	Provisional	Named after	Date	Site	Discoverer(s)	Category	Diam.	Ref
345001	2005 BE_{7}	—	January 16, 2005	Socorro	LINEAR	·	2.1 km	MPC · JPL
345002	2005 BR_{10}	—	January 16, 2005	Kitt Peak	Spacewatch	EUN	1.5 km	MPC · JPL
345003	2005 BF_{49}	—	January 16, 2005	Catalina	CSS	·	1.6 km	MPC · JPL
345004	2005 CK_{1}	—	February 1, 2005	Catalina	CSS	·	1.7 km	MPC · JPL
345005	2005 CK_{5}	—	February 1, 2005	Kitt Peak	Spacewatch	·	1.8 km	MPC · JPL
345006	2005 CF_{6}	—	February 1, 2005	Kitt Peak	Spacewatch	·	1.4 km	MPC · JPL
345007	2005 CH_{14}	—	February 2, 2005	Kitt Peak	Spacewatch	·	1.5 km	MPC · JPL
345008	2005 CP_{14}	—	February 2, 2005	Kitt Peak	Spacewatch	·	1.2 km	MPC · JPL
345009	2005 CL_{16}	—	February 2, 2005	Socorro	LINEAR	·	3.1 km	MPC · JPL
345010	2005 CX_{27}	—	February 3, 2005	Socorro	LINEAR	·	1.8 km	MPC · JPL
345011	2005 CM_{29}	—	February 1, 2005	Kitt Peak	Spacewatch	MIS	2.7 km	MPC · JPL
345012	2005 CL_{62}	—	February 9, 2005	Anderson Mesa	LONEOS	(5)	1.5 km	MPC · JPL
345013	2005 CZ_{65}	—	February 9, 2005	Socorro	LINEAR	JUN	1.1 km	MPC · JPL
345014	2005 DT_{1}	—	February 28, 2005	Catalina	CSS	·	1.6 km	MPC · JPL
345015	2005 EC_{2}	—	March 2, 2005	Catalina	CSS	H	630 m	MPC · JPL
345016	2005 EP_{4}	—	March 1, 2005	Junk Bond	Junk Bond	·	1.4 km	MPC · JPL
345017	2005 EP_{8}	—	March 2, 2005	Kitt Peak	Spacewatch	·	1.3 km	MPC · JPL
345018	2005 EK_{43}	—	March 3, 2005	Kitt Peak	Spacewatch	·	1.7 km	MPC · JPL
345019	2005 EZ_{45}	—	March 3, 2005	Catalina	CSS	·	3.2 km	MPC · JPL
345020	2005 EU_{59}	—	March 4, 2005	Mount Lemmon	Mount Lemmon Survey	·	2.0 km	MPC · JPL
345021	2005 EF_{72}	—	March 2, 2005	Catalina	CSS	·	2.6 km	MPC · JPL
345022	2005 EY_{77}	—	March 3, 2005	Catalina	CSS	·	2.0 km	MPC · JPL
345023	2005 EF_{83}	—	March 4, 2005	Kitt Peak	Spacewatch	·	3.3 km	MPC · JPL
345024	2005 EV_{83}	—	March 4, 2005	Catalina	CSS	·	3.2 km	MPC · JPL
345025	2005 EF_{92}	—	March 8, 2005	Anderson Mesa	LONEOS	·	2.7 km	MPC · JPL
345026	2005 EQ_{97}	—	March 3, 2005	Catalina	CSS	·	1.8 km	MPC · JPL
345027	2005 EE_{110}	—	March 4, 2005	Mount Lemmon	Mount Lemmon Survey	·	1.9 km	MPC · JPL
345028	2005 EV_{112}	—	March 4, 2005	Mount Lemmon	Mount Lemmon Survey	·	1.7 km	MPC · JPL
345029	2005 EV_{119}	—	March 8, 2005	Anderson Mesa	LONEOS	·	1.5 km	MPC · JPL
345030	2005 EU_{145}	—	March 10, 2005	Mount Lemmon	Mount Lemmon Survey	·	2.8 km	MPC · JPL
345031	2005 EN_{148}	—	March 10, 2005	Kitt Peak	Spacewatch	EOS	2.4 km	MPC · JPL
345032	2005 EP_{162}	—	March 10, 2005	Mount Lemmon	Mount Lemmon Survey	·	2.1 km	MPC · JPL
345033	2005 EX_{163}	—	March 10, 2005	Mount Lemmon	Mount Lemmon Survey	·	1.9 km	MPC · JPL
345034	2005 EA_{165}	—	March 11, 2005	Kitt Peak	Spacewatch	·	1.9 km	MPC · JPL
345035	2005 EA_{168}	—	March 11, 2005	Mount Lemmon	Mount Lemmon Survey	HOF	2.7 km	MPC · JPL
345036	2005 EP_{176}	—	March 8, 2005	Mount Lemmon	Mount Lemmon Survey	·	2.1 km	MPC · JPL
345037	2005 ED_{189}	—	March 10, 2005	Siding Spring	SSS	·	2.6 km	MPC · JPL
345038	2005 EJ_{190}	—	March 11, 2005	Mount Lemmon	Mount Lemmon Survey	·	1.0 km	MPC · JPL
345039	2005 EB_{225}	—	March 12, 2005	Socorro	LINEAR	(40134)	3.3 km	MPC · JPL
345040	2005 ER_{229}	—	March 10, 2005	Mount Lemmon	Mount Lemmon Survey	·	1.7 km	MPC · JPL
345041	2005 ES_{233}	—	March 10, 2005	Anderson Mesa	LONEOS	·	2.1 km	MPC · JPL
345042	2005 EC_{270}	—	March 12, 2005	Socorro	LINEAR	·	2.2 km	MPC · JPL
345043	2005 EH_{284}	—	March 11, 2005	Mount Lemmon	Mount Lemmon Survey	·	1.6 km	MPC · JPL
345044	2005 EP_{286}	—	March 9, 2005	Catalina	CSS	·	2.1 km	MPC · JPL
345045	2005 EC_{320}	—	March 9, 2005	Mount Lemmon	Mount Lemmon Survey	BRA	1.6 km	MPC · JPL
345046	2005 FJ_{4}	—	March 30, 2005	Catalina	CSS	·	2.5 km	MPC · JPL
345047	2005 GC_{2}	—	April 1, 2005	Catalina	CSS	·	2.0 km	MPC · JPL
345048	2005 GO_{40}	—	April 4, 2005	Mount Lemmon	Mount Lemmon Survey	·	2.2 km	MPC · JPL
345049	2005 GP_{48}	—	April 5, 2005	Mount Lemmon	Mount Lemmon Survey	·	1.5 km	MPC · JPL
345050	2005 GJ_{54}	—	April 5, 2005	Mount Lemmon	Mount Lemmon Survey	AGN	1.2 km	MPC · JPL
345051	2005 GD_{72}	—	April 4, 2005	Mount Lemmon	Mount Lemmon Survey	·	2.4 km	MPC · JPL
345052	2005 GQ_{73}	—	April 4, 2005	Mount Lemmon	Mount Lemmon Survey	·	2.1 km	MPC · JPL
345053	2005 GD_{103}	—	April 9, 2005	Kitt Peak	Spacewatch	·	930 m	MPC · JPL
345054	2005 GK_{104}	—	November 20, 2003	Kitt Peak	Spacewatch	MRX	1.0 km	MPC · JPL
345055	2005 GO_{109}	—	April 10, 2005	Mount Lemmon	Mount Lemmon Survey	KOR	1.3 km	MPC · JPL
345056	2005 GJ_{119}	—	April 11, 2005	Socorro	LINEAR	·	2.7 km	MPC · JPL
345057	2005 GX_{129}	—	April 7, 2005	Kitt Peak	Spacewatch	·	2.2 km	MPC · JPL
345058	2005 GY_{129}	—	April 7, 2005	Kitt Peak	Spacewatch	·	3.1 km	MPC · JPL
345059	2005 GO_{133}	—	April 10, 2005	Kitt Peak	Spacewatch	AGN	1.4 km	MPC · JPL
345060	2005 GC_{147}	—	March 15, 2005	Mount Lemmon	Mount Lemmon Survey	·	2.8 km	MPC · JPL
345061	2005 GF_{164}	—	April 10, 2005	Mount Lemmon	Mount Lemmon Survey	·	2.6 km	MPC · JPL
345062	2005 GP_{166}	—	April 11, 2005	Mount Lemmon	Mount Lemmon Survey	·	1.7 km	MPC · JPL
345063	2005 GU_{166}	—	April 2, 2005	Mount Lemmon	Mount Lemmon Survey	·	1.8 km	MPC · JPL
345064	2005 GT_{172}	—	March 16, 2005	Mount Lemmon	Mount Lemmon Survey	·	3.0 km	MPC · JPL
345065	2005 GU_{204}	—	April 10, 2005	Mount Lemmon	Mount Lemmon Survey	T_{j} (2.98) · EUP	2.8 km	MPC · JPL
345066	2005 JR_{1}	—	May 3, 2005	Junk Bond	Junk Bond	·	2.2 km	MPC · JPL
345067	2005 JY_{15}	—	May 3, 2005	Kitt Peak	Spacewatch	·	4.5 km	MPC · JPL
345068	2005 JF_{27}	—	May 3, 2005	Socorro	LINEAR	·	3.6 km	MPC · JPL
345069	2005 JW_{32}	—	May 4, 2005	Mount Lemmon	Mount Lemmon Survey	·	2.8 km	MPC · JPL
345070	2005 JV_{42}	—	May 8, 2005	Kitt Peak	Spacewatch	·	5.5 km	MPC · JPL
345071	2005 JE_{47}	—	May 3, 2005	Kitt Peak	Spacewatch	·	2.1 km	MPC · JPL
345072	2005 JC_{52}	—	May 4, 2005	Kitt Peak	Spacewatch	KOR	1.4 km	MPC · JPL
345073	2005 JO_{65}	—	May 4, 2005	Kitt Peak	Spacewatch	·	960 m	MPC · JPL
345074	2005 JE_{69}	—	May 6, 2005	Kitt Peak	Spacewatch	TIR	3.4 km	MPC · JPL
345075	2005 JP_{78}	—	April 11, 2005	Mount Lemmon	Mount Lemmon Survey	·	1.7 km	MPC · JPL
345076	2005 JB_{87}	—	May 9, 2005	Mount Lemmon	Mount Lemmon Survey	ADE	2.0 km	MPC · JPL
345077	2005 JN_{111}	—	May 9, 2005	Kitt Peak	Spacewatch	EOS	2.2 km	MPC · JPL
345078	2005 JX_{134}	—	May 14, 2005	Mount Lemmon	Mount Lemmon Survey	·	1.7 km	MPC · JPL
345079	2005 JW_{146}	—	May 14, 2005	Kitt Peak	Spacewatch	·	3.8 km	MPC · JPL
345080	2005 JO_{162}	—	May 8, 2005	Kitt Peak	Spacewatch	LIX	3.3 km	MPC · JPL
345081	2005 JH_{182}	—	May 4, 2005	Kitt Peak	Spacewatch	·	3.3 km	MPC · JPL
345082	2005 KS_{1}	—	May 16, 2005	Mount Lemmon	Mount Lemmon Survey	·	2.4 km	MPC · JPL
345083	2005 KK_{3}	—	May 17, 2005	Mount Lemmon	Mount Lemmon Survey	·	3.8 km	MPC · JPL
345084	2005 LA_{11}	—	June 3, 2005	Kitt Peak	Spacewatch	EOS	2.5 km	MPC · JPL
345085	2005 LJ_{21}	—	June 6, 2005	Kitt Peak	Spacewatch	·	3.7 km	MPC · JPL
345086	2005 LY_{25}	—	June 8, 2005	Kitt Peak	Spacewatch	·	3.1 km	MPC · JPL
345087	2005 LA_{39}	—	June 11, 2005	Kitt Peak	Spacewatch	·	3.1 km	MPC · JPL
345088	2005 MF	—	June 16, 2005	Mount Lemmon	Mount Lemmon Survey	·	3.8 km	MPC · JPL
345089	2005 MX_{6}	—	June 27, 2005	Kitt Peak	Spacewatch	·	3.3 km	MPC · JPL
345090	2005 MM_{15}	—	June 18, 2005	Mount Lemmon	Mount Lemmon Survey	·	840 m	MPC · JPL
345091	2005 MG_{19}	—	June 29, 2005	Kitt Peak	Spacewatch	·	2.2 km	MPC · JPL
345092	2005 MD_{21}	—	June 30, 2005	Palomar	NEAT	·	660 m	MPC · JPL
345093	2005 MO_{29}	—	June 29, 2005	Kitt Peak	Spacewatch	·	4.4 km	MPC · JPL
345094	2005 MV_{35}	—	June 30, 2005	Kitt Peak	Spacewatch	·	650 m	MPC · JPL
345095	2005 MB_{40}	—	June 30, 2005	Kitt Peak	Spacewatch	·	780 m	MPC · JPL
345096	2005 MG_{40}	—	June 30, 2005	Kitt Peak	Spacewatch	·	540 m	MPC · JPL
345097	2005 NH_{1}	—	July 2, 2005	Catalina	CSS	·	800 m	MPC · JPL
345098	2005 NK_{10}	—	July 3, 2005	Mount Lemmon	Mount Lemmon Survey	·	2.1 km	MPC · JPL
345099	2005 NA_{15}	—	July 4, 2005	Palomar	NEAT	·	820 m	MPC · JPL
345100	2005 NS_{24}	—	July 4, 2005	Kitt Peak	Spacewatch	·	3.3 km	MPC · JPL

== 345101–345200 ==
back to top

Designation			Discovery			Properties		Ref
Permanent	Provisional	Named after	Date	Site	Discoverer(s)	Category	Diam.	Ref
345101	2005 NK_{35}	—	July 5, 2005	Kitt Peak	Spacewatch	·	3.5 km	MPC · JPL
345102	2005 NO_{42}	—	June 18, 2005	Mount Lemmon	Mount Lemmon Survey	VER	3.1 km	MPC · JPL
345103	2005 NA_{47}	—	July 7, 2005	Campo Imperatore	CINEOS	·	740 m	MPC · JPL
345104	2005 NU_{70}	—	July 4, 2005	Palomar	NEAT	·	750 m	MPC · JPL
345105	2005 NY_{71}	—	July 5, 2005	Palomar	NEAT	·	600 m	MPC · JPL
345106	2005 OS_{4}	—	July 27, 2005	Palomar	NEAT	·	1.0 km	MPC · JPL
345107	2005 OV_{15}	—	July 29, 2005	Palomar	NEAT	·	820 m	MPC · JPL
345108	2005 PF_{4}	—	July 30, 2005	Palomar	NEAT	·	1.0 km	MPC · JPL
345109	2005 PS_{10}	—	July 18, 2005	Palomar	NEAT	·	780 m	MPC · JPL
345110	2005 QL_{2}	—	August 24, 2005	Palomar	NEAT	V	860 m	MPC · JPL
345111	2005 QX_{8}	—	August 25, 2005	Palomar	NEAT	·	890 m	MPC · JPL
345112	2005 QD_{33}	—	August 25, 2005	Palomar	NEAT	·	720 m	MPC · JPL
345113	2005 QY_{36}	—	August 25, 2005	Palomar	NEAT	·	820 m	MPC · JPL
345114	2005 QA_{38}	—	August 25, 2005	Palomar	NEAT	·	1.1 km	MPC · JPL
345115	2005 QY_{39}	—	August 26, 2005	Palomar	NEAT	·	970 m	MPC · JPL
345116	2005 QS_{41}	—	August 26, 2005	Anderson Mesa	LONEOS	·	740 m	MPC · JPL
345117	2005 QM_{52}	—	August 27, 2005	Needville	Dillon, W. G.	·	940 m	MPC · JPL
345118	2005 QW_{59}	—	August 25, 2005	Palomar	NEAT	·	840 m	MPC · JPL
345119	2005 QJ_{70}	—	August 26, 2005	Palomar	NEAT	·	850 m	MPC · JPL
345120	2005 QR_{73}	—	August 29, 2005	Anderson Mesa	LONEOS	·	1.6 km	MPC · JPL
345121	2005 QQ_{95}	—	August 27, 2005	Palomar	NEAT	HYG	5.2 km	MPC · JPL
345122	2005 QU_{103}	—	August 27, 2005	Palomar	NEAT	·	760 m	MPC · JPL
345123	2005 QD_{131}	—	August 28, 2005	Kitt Peak	Spacewatch	·	860 m	MPC · JPL
345124	2005 QR_{148}	—	August 30, 2005	Anderson Mesa	LONEOS	·	720 m	MPC · JPL
345125	2005 QF_{157}	—	August 30, 2005	Palomar	NEAT	·	880 m	MPC · JPL
345126	2005 QQ_{159}	—	July 29, 2005	Palomar	NEAT	·	880 m	MPC · JPL
345127	2005 QK_{165}	—	August 31, 2005	Palomar	NEAT	V	850 m	MPC · JPL
345128	2005 QH_{169}	—	August 29, 2005	Palomar	NEAT	·	950 m	MPC · JPL
345129	2005 QN_{172}	—	August 29, 2005	Palomar	NEAT	·	720 m	MPC · JPL
345130	2005 RS_{29}	—	September 13, 2005	Socorro	LINEAR	·	600 m	MPC · JPL
345131	2005 SC_{1}	—	September 23, 2005	Kitt Peak	Spacewatch	·	630 m	MPC · JPL
345132	2005 SB_{3}	—	September 23, 2005	Catalina	CSS	·	860 m	MPC · JPL
345133	2005 SL_{4}	—	September 24, 2005	Altschwendt	W. Ries	·	1.1 km	MPC · JPL
345134	2005 SK_{5}	—	September 23, 2005	Catalina	CSS	PHO	910 m	MPC · JPL
345135	2005 SO_{22}	—	September 23, 2005	Kitt Peak	Spacewatch	·	1.2 km	MPC · JPL
345136	2005 SS_{39}	—	September 24, 2005	Kitt Peak	Spacewatch	·	860 m	MPC · JPL
345137	2005 SV_{43}	—	September 24, 2005	Kitt Peak	Spacewatch	V	560 m	MPC · JPL
345138	2005 SS_{44}	—	August 30, 2005	Palomar	NEAT	·	1.2 km	MPC · JPL
345139	2005 SP_{47}	—	September 24, 2005	Kitt Peak	Spacewatch	·	840 m	MPC · JPL
345140	2005 SH_{53}	—	September 25, 2005	Catalina	CSS	·	940 m	MPC · JPL
345141	2005 SH_{56}	—	September 25, 2005	Kitt Peak	Spacewatch	·	1.6 km	MPC · JPL
345142	2005 SJ_{56}	—	September 25, 2005	Kitt Peak	Spacewatch	·	790 m	MPC · JPL
345143	2005 SO_{71}	—	September 23, 2005	Kitt Peak	Spacewatch	·	1.0 km	MPC · JPL
345144	2005 SV_{79}	—	September 24, 2005	Kitt Peak	Spacewatch	·	1.2 km	MPC · JPL
345145	2005 SD_{83}	—	September 24, 2005	Kitt Peak	Spacewatch	V	660 m	MPC · JPL
345146	2005 SL_{102}	—	September 25, 2005	Kitt Peak	Spacewatch	(883)	820 m	MPC · JPL
345147	2005 SW_{107}	—	September 26, 2005	Kitt Peak	Spacewatch	·	830 m	MPC · JPL
345148	2005 SE_{108}	—	September 26, 2005	Kitt Peak	Spacewatch	·	1.5 km	MPC · JPL
345149	2005 SY_{115}	—	September 27, 2005	Kitt Peak	Spacewatch	·	1.0 km	MPC · JPL
345150	2005 SB_{122}	—	September 29, 2005	Kitt Peak	Spacewatch	·	920 m	MPC · JPL
345151	2005 SU_{123}	—	September 29, 2005	Anderson Mesa	LONEOS	·	710 m	MPC · JPL
345152	2005 SJ_{128}	—	September 29, 2005	Anderson Mesa	LONEOS	·	810 m	MPC · JPL
345153	2005 SP_{129}	—	September 29, 2005	Mount Lemmon	Mount Lemmon Survey	·	1.1 km	MPC · JPL
345154	2005 SP_{131}	—	September 29, 2005	Kitt Peak	Spacewatch	·	970 m	MPC · JPL
345155	2005 SB_{166}	—	September 28, 2005	Palomar	NEAT	·	930 m	MPC · JPL
345156	2005 SQ_{167}	—	September 28, 2005	Palomar	NEAT	·	1.1 km	MPC · JPL
345157	2005 SE_{171}	—	September 29, 2005	Kitt Peak	Spacewatch	·	970 m	MPC · JPL
345158	2005 SO_{193}	—	September 29, 2005	Kitt Peak	Spacewatch	·	1.3 km	MPC · JPL
345159	2005 SO_{205}	—	September 11, 2005	Socorro	LINEAR	·	840 m	MPC · JPL
345160	2005 SN_{206}	—	September 30, 2005	Anderson Mesa	LONEOS	·	1.2 km	MPC · JPL
345161	2005 SM_{223}	—	August 26, 2005	Palomar	NEAT	·	1.4 km	MPC · JPL
345162	2005 SK_{224}	—	September 29, 2005	Mount Lemmon	Mount Lemmon Survey	CYB	3.9 km	MPC · JPL
345163	2005 SJ_{238}	—	September 29, 2005	Kitt Peak	Spacewatch	·	760 m	MPC · JPL
345164	2005 SH_{249}	—	September 30, 2005	Mount Lemmon	Mount Lemmon Survey	NYS	1.0 km	MPC · JPL
345165	2005 SJ_{260}	—	September 22, 2005	Palomar	NEAT	·	1.0 km	MPC · JPL
345166	2005 SP_{263}	—	September 23, 2005	Kitt Peak	Spacewatch	·	700 m	MPC · JPL
345167	2005 ST_{265}	—	September 27, 2005	Palomar	NEAT	·	790 m	MPC · JPL
345168	2005 SD_{271}	—	September 30, 2005	Anderson Mesa	LONEOS	·	900 m	MPC · JPL
345169	2005 SQ_{278}	—	September 29, 2005	Mount Lemmon	Mount Lemmon Survey	·	700 m	MPC · JPL
345170	2005 SW_{285}	—	September 25, 2005	Apache Point	A. C. Becker	CYB	4.6 km	MPC · JPL
345171	2005 TO_{18}	—	October 1, 2005	Socorro	LINEAR	(2076)	830 m	MPC · JPL
345172	2005 TJ_{29}	—	October 2, 2005	Mount Lemmon	Mount Lemmon Survey	·	1.2 km	MPC · JPL
345173	2005 TN_{36}	—	October 1, 2005	Mount Lemmon	Mount Lemmon Survey	·	920 m	MPC · JPL
345174	2005 TM_{41}	—	October 2, 2005	Mount Lemmon	Mount Lemmon Survey	·	810 m	MPC · JPL
345175	2005 TY_{65}	—	October 2, 2005	Palomar	NEAT	·	820 m	MPC · JPL
345176	2005 TF_{72}	—	October 3, 2005	Catalina	CSS	·	780 m	MPC · JPL
345177	2005 TR_{73}	—	October 7, 2005	Anderson Mesa	LONEOS	·	1.1 km	MPC · JPL
345178	2005 TS_{74}	—	October 1, 2005	Catalina	CSS	(883)	1.0 km	MPC · JPL
345179	2005 TG_{78}	—	October 7, 2005	Mount Lemmon	Mount Lemmon Survey	(45637) · CYB	4.7 km	MPC · JPL
345180	2005 TA_{82}	—	October 3, 2005	Kitt Peak	Spacewatch	·	730 m	MPC · JPL
345181	2005 TL_{94}	—	September 25, 2005	Kitt Peak	Spacewatch	·	860 m	MPC · JPL
345182	2005 TF_{97}	—	October 6, 2005	Mount Lemmon	Mount Lemmon Survey	·	1.1 km	MPC · JPL
345183	2005 TB_{99}	—	October 7, 2005	Catalina	CSS	·	990 m	MPC · JPL
345184	2005 TL_{103}	—	September 29, 2005	Kitt Peak	Spacewatch	·	1.0 km	MPC · JPL
345185	2005 TO_{128}	—	October 7, 2005	Kitt Peak	Spacewatch	·	750 m	MPC · JPL
345186	2005 TC_{169}	—	October 9, 2005	Kitt Peak	Spacewatch	·	1.1 km	MPC · JPL
345187	2005 TM_{171}	—	October 10, 2005	Anderson Mesa	LONEOS	·	1.2 km	MPC · JPL
345188	2005 TY_{178}	—	October 23, 1995	Kitt Peak	Spacewatch	·	780 m	MPC · JPL
345189	2005 TS_{182}	—	October 5, 2005	Catalina	CSS	·	1.1 km	MPC · JPL
345190	2005 UX_{18}	—	October 22, 2005	Kitt Peak	Spacewatch	·	910 m	MPC · JPL
345191	2005 UR_{21}	—	October 23, 2005	Kitt Peak	Spacewatch	·	940 m	MPC · JPL
345192	2005 UD_{23}	—	October 23, 2005	Kitt Peak	Spacewatch	·	700 m	MPC · JPL
345193	2005 UL_{28}	—	October 23, 2005	Kitt Peak	Spacewatch	·	1.1 km	MPC · JPL
345194	2005 UM_{30}	—	October 23, 2005	Catalina	CSS	·	1.1 km	MPC · JPL
345195	2005 UD_{31}	—	October 24, 2005	Kitt Peak	Spacewatch	V	750 m	MPC · JPL
345196	2005 UG_{33}	—	September 30, 2005	Mount Lemmon	Mount Lemmon Survey	·	1.0 km	MPC · JPL
345197	2005 UP_{50}	—	October 23, 2005	Catalina	CSS	·	910 m	MPC · JPL
345198	2005 UB_{55}	—	October 23, 2005	Catalina	CSS	·	1.1 km	MPC · JPL
345199	2005 UD_{56}	—	October 23, 2005	Catalina	CSS	·	790 m	MPC · JPL
345200	2005 UV_{61}	—	October 25, 2005	Mount Lemmon	Mount Lemmon Survey	·	1.1 km	MPC · JPL

== 345201–345300 ==
back to top

Designation			Discovery			Properties		Ref
Permanent	Provisional	Named after	Date	Site	Discoverer(s)	Category	Diam.	Ref
345201	2005 UB_{65}	—	October 20, 2005	Palomar	NEAT	·	1.0 km	MPC · JPL
345202	2005 UO_{71}	—	October 23, 2005	Catalina	CSS	·	840 m	MPC · JPL
345203	2005 UE_{77}	—	October 24, 2005	Kitt Peak	Spacewatch	·	1.7 km	MPC · JPL
345204	2005 UT_{85}	—	October 22, 2005	Kitt Peak	Spacewatch	·	830 m	MPC · JPL
345205	2005 UW_{89}	—	October 22, 2005	Kitt Peak	Spacewatch	·	860 m	MPC · JPL
345206	2005 UE_{91}	—	October 22, 2005	Kitt Peak	Spacewatch	·	1.0 km	MPC · JPL
345207	2005 UA_{92}	—	October 22, 2005	Kitt Peak	Spacewatch	·	1.1 km	MPC · JPL
345208	2005 UR_{93}	—	October 22, 2005	Kitt Peak	Spacewatch	·	890 m	MPC · JPL
345209	2005 UD_{103}	—	October 22, 2005	Kitt Peak	Spacewatch	·	1.4 km	MPC · JPL
345210	2005 UB_{108}	—	October 22, 2005	Kitt Peak	Spacewatch	NYS	1.2 km	MPC · JPL
345211	2005 UZ_{109}	—	October 22, 2005	Kitt Peak	Spacewatch	·	1.2 km	MPC · JPL
345212	2005 UA_{111}	—	October 22, 2005	Kitt Peak	Spacewatch	·	680 m	MPC · JPL
345213	2005 UB_{112}	—	October 22, 2005	Kitt Peak	Spacewatch	·	840 m	MPC · JPL
345214	2005 UO_{114}	—	October 22, 2005	Catalina	CSS	·	1.2 km	MPC · JPL
345215	2005 UE_{115}	—	October 23, 2005	Palomar	NEAT	·	810 m	MPC · JPL
345216	2005 UN_{116}	—	October 23, 2005	Catalina	CSS	·	1.1 km	MPC · JPL
345217	2005 UW_{139}	—	October 25, 2005	Mount Lemmon	Mount Lemmon Survey	·	630 m	MPC · JPL
345218	2005 UJ_{152}	—	October 26, 2005	Kitt Peak	Spacewatch	NYS	970 m	MPC · JPL
345219	2005 UB_{157}	—	October 27, 2005	Kitt Peak	Spacewatch	·	1.1 km	MPC · JPL
345220	2005 UV_{158}	—	October 29, 2005	Eskridge	Farpoint	·	1.1 km	MPC · JPL
345221	2005 UH_{163}	—	October 23, 2005	Kitt Peak	Spacewatch	·	780 m	MPC · JPL
345222	2005 UU_{168}	—	October 24, 2005	Kitt Peak	Spacewatch	·	900 m	MPC · JPL
345223	2005 UR_{171}	—	October 24, 2005	Kitt Peak	Spacewatch	NYS	1 km	MPC · JPL
345224	2005 UL_{173}	—	October 24, 2005	Kitt Peak	Spacewatch	·	940 m	MPC · JPL
345225	2005 UC_{176}	—	October 24, 2005	Kitt Peak	Spacewatch	·	1.2 km	MPC · JPL
345226	2005 UY_{189}	—	October 27, 2005	Mount Lemmon	Mount Lemmon Survey	3:2 · SHU	5.4 km	MPC · JPL
345227	2005 UY_{193}	—	October 22, 2005	Kitt Peak	Spacewatch	·	880 m	MPC · JPL
345228	2005 UF_{198}	—	October 25, 2005	Kitt Peak	Spacewatch	·	910 m	MPC · JPL
345229	2005 UY_{205}	—	October 26, 2005	Kitt Peak	Spacewatch	·	1.1 km	MPC · JPL
345230	2005 UM_{214}	—	October 26, 2005	Anderson Mesa	LONEOS	·	980 m	MPC · JPL
345231	2005 UR_{214}	—	October 27, 2005	Palomar	NEAT	V	660 m	MPC · JPL
345232	2005 UD_{215}	—	October 27, 2005	Palomar	NEAT	·	990 m	MPC · JPL
345233	2005 UL_{216}	—	October 25, 2005	Catalina	CSS	V	930 m	MPC · JPL
345234	2005 UN_{216}	—	October 25, 2005	Catalina	CSS	V	860 m	MPC · JPL
345235	2005 UX_{222}	—	October 25, 2005	Kitt Peak	Spacewatch	·	730 m	MPC · JPL
345236	2005 UT_{234}	—	October 25, 2005	Kitt Peak	Spacewatch	·	870 m	MPC · JPL
345237	2005 UT_{239}	—	October 25, 2005	Kitt Peak	Spacewatch	·	930 m	MPC · JPL
345238	2005 UN_{247}	—	October 28, 2005	Mount Lemmon	Mount Lemmon Survey	·	960 m	MPC · JPL
345239	2005 UY_{252}	—	October 26, 2005	Anderson Mesa	LONEOS	·	1.1 km	MPC · JPL
345240	2005 UU_{266}	—	October 27, 2005	Kitt Peak	Spacewatch	3:2 · SHU	4.8 km	MPC · JPL
345241	2005 UV_{277}	—	October 24, 2005	Kitt Peak	Spacewatch	·	750 m	MPC · JPL
345242	2005 UF_{283}	—	October 26, 2005	Kitt Peak	Spacewatch	·	880 m	MPC · JPL
345243	2005 UL_{293}	—	October 26, 2005	Kitt Peak	Spacewatch	NYS	850 m	MPC · JPL
345244	2005 UT_{304}	—	October 26, 2005	Kitt Peak	Spacewatch	·	900 m	MPC · JPL
345245	2005 UE_{306}	—	October 27, 2005	Mount Lemmon	Mount Lemmon Survey	·	830 m	MPC · JPL
345246	2005 UQ_{314}	—	October 28, 2005	Catalina	CSS	·	1.1 km	MPC · JPL
345247	2005 UM_{410}	—	October 31, 2005	Mount Lemmon	Mount Lemmon Survey	·	850 m	MPC · JPL
345248	2005 UZ_{410}	—	October 31, 2005	Mount Lemmon	Mount Lemmon Survey	·	1.8 km	MPC · JPL
345249	2005 UJ_{433}	—	October 28, 2005	Kitt Peak	Spacewatch	·	810 m	MPC · JPL
345250	2005 UX_{440}	—	October 29, 2005	Catalina	CSS	·	1.0 km	MPC · JPL
345251	2005 UE_{455}	—	October 28, 2005	Mount Lemmon	Mount Lemmon Survey	·	1.0 km	MPC · JPL
345252	2005 UV_{456}	—	October 30, 2005	Palomar	NEAT	PHO	1.3 km	MPC · JPL
345253	2005 UJ_{472}	—	October 30, 2005	Kitt Peak	Spacewatch	V	630 m	MPC · JPL
345254	2005 UT_{477}	—	October 26, 2005	Anderson Mesa	LONEOS	V	770 m	MPC · JPL
345255	2005 UR_{502}	—	October 31, 2005	Anderson Mesa	LONEOS	·	1.6 km	MPC · JPL
345256	2005 VE_{6}	—	November 4, 2005	Kitt Peak	Spacewatch	V	560 m	MPC · JPL
345257	2005 VT_{6}	—	November 6, 2005	Kitt Peak	Spacewatch	·	960 m	MPC · JPL
345258	2005 VM_{8}	—	November 1, 2005	Kitt Peak	Spacewatch	·	810 m	MPC · JPL
345259	2005 VT_{17}	—	November 4, 2005	Mount Lemmon	Mount Lemmon Survey	·	1.0 km	MPC · JPL
345260	2005 VQ_{25}	—	November 2, 2005	Socorro	LINEAR	V	700 m	MPC · JPL
345261	2005 VN_{28}	—	October 29, 2005	Catalina	CSS	·	920 m	MPC · JPL
345262	2005 VT_{30}	—	November 4, 2005	Kitt Peak	Spacewatch	NYS	1.1 km	MPC · JPL
345263	2005 VT_{42}	—	November 4, 2005	Catalina	CSS	·	840 m	MPC · JPL
345264	2005 VV_{51}	—	October 27, 2005	Kitt Peak	Spacewatch	·	940 m	MPC · JPL
345265	2005 VS_{59}	—	October 25, 2005	Kitt Peak	Spacewatch	·	1.0 km	MPC · JPL
345266	2005 VC_{60}	—	September 19, 1998	Apache Point	SDSS	·	790 m	MPC · JPL
345267	2005 VQ_{60}	—	November 5, 2005	Mount Lemmon	Mount Lemmon Survey	·	920 m	MPC · JPL
345268	2005 VX_{61}	—	November 1, 2005	Mount Lemmon	Mount Lemmon Survey	·	1.2 km	MPC · JPL
345269	2005 VA_{70}	—	November 1, 2005	Mount Lemmon	Mount Lemmon Survey	·	1 km	MPC · JPL
345270	2005 VZ_{70}	—	November 1, 2005	Mount Lemmon	Mount Lemmon Survey	·	1.3 km	MPC · JPL
345271	2005 VO_{95}	—	October 29, 2005	Mount Lemmon	Mount Lemmon Survey	NYS	910 m	MPC · JPL
345272	2005 VG_{99}	—	November 10, 2005	Catalina	CSS	·	1.8 km	MPC · JPL
345273	2005 VS_{102}	—	November 2, 2005	Catalina	CSS	·	1.1 km	MPC · JPL
345274	2005 VY_{102}	—	November 2, 2005	Mount Lemmon	Mount Lemmon Survey	·	1.3 km	MPC · JPL
345275	2005 VE_{104}	—	November 3, 2005	Mount Lemmon	Mount Lemmon Survey	(2076)	970 m	MPC · JPL
345276	2005 WP_{16}	—	November 22, 2005	Kitt Peak	Spacewatch	·	1.1 km	MPC · JPL
345277	2005 WD_{26}	—	November 21, 2005	Kitt Peak	Spacewatch	NYS	830 m	MPC · JPL
345278	2005 WV_{36}	—	November 22, 2005	Kitt Peak	Spacewatch	·	1.2 km	MPC · JPL
345279	2005 WF_{37}	—	November 22, 2005	Kitt Peak	Spacewatch	·	830 m	MPC · JPL
345280	2005 WL_{39}	—	November 25, 2005	Mount Lemmon	Mount Lemmon Survey	3:2	4.9 km	MPC · JPL
345281	2005 WQ_{41}	—	November 21, 2005	Kitt Peak	Spacewatch	·	1.2 km	MPC · JPL
345282	2005 WP_{50}	—	November 25, 2005	Mount Lemmon	Mount Lemmon Survey	·	870 m	MPC · JPL
345283	2005 WW_{50}	—	November 25, 2005	Mount Lemmon	Mount Lemmon Survey	·	1.3 km	MPC · JPL
345284	2005 WZ_{52}	—	November 25, 2005	Mount Lemmon	Mount Lemmon Survey	·	970 m	MPC · JPL
345285	2005 WQ_{55}	—	November 21, 2005	Catalina	CSS	·	1.3 km	MPC · JPL
345286	2005 WM_{63}	—	November 25, 2005	Mount Lemmon	Mount Lemmon Survey	MAS	690 m	MPC · JPL
345287	2005 WT_{73}	—	November 26, 2005	Mount Lemmon	Mount Lemmon Survey	·	1.2 km	MPC · JPL
345288	2005 WS_{79}	—	November 25, 2005	Kitt Peak	Spacewatch	·	1.2 km	MPC · JPL
345289	2005 WS_{81}	—	November 28, 2005	Catalina	CSS	(2076)	940 m	MPC · JPL
345290	2005 WU_{85}	—	April 28, 2000	Kitt Peak	Spacewatch	·	1.4 km	MPC · JPL
345291	2005 WA_{90}	—	November 26, 2005	Catalina	CSS	·	820 m	MPC · JPL
345292	2005 WB_{102}	—	November 29, 2005	Socorro	LINEAR	·	920 m	MPC · JPL
345293	2005 WD_{103}	—	November 26, 2005	Catalina	CSS	·	920 m	MPC · JPL
345294	2005 WG_{122}	—	November 25, 2005	Mount Lemmon	Mount Lemmon Survey	·	1.1 km	MPC · JPL
345295	2005 WH_{133}	—	November 25, 2005	Mount Lemmon	Mount Lemmon Survey	·	1.3 km	MPC · JPL
345296	2005 WR_{141}	—	November 28, 2005	Mount Lemmon	Mount Lemmon Survey	·	1.2 km	MPC · JPL
345297	2005 WV_{151}	—	November 28, 2005	Catalina	CSS	·	1.4 km	MPC · JPL
345298	2005 WN_{153}	—	November 29, 2005	Kitt Peak	Spacewatch	·	850 m	MPC · JPL
345299	2005 WP_{157}	—	November 25, 2005	Mount Lemmon	Mount Lemmon Survey	·	1.4 km	MPC · JPL
345300	2005 WC_{161}	—	November 28, 2005	Socorro	LINEAR	·	1.4 km	MPC · JPL

== 345301–345400 ==
back to top

Designation			Discovery			Properties		Ref
Permanent	Provisional	Named after	Date	Site	Discoverer(s)	Category	Diam.	Ref
345301	2005 WJ_{166}	—	November 29, 2005	Mount Lemmon	Mount Lemmon Survey	3:2	3.8 km	MPC · JPL
345302	2005 WA_{173}	—	November 30, 2005	Mount Lemmon	Mount Lemmon Survey	·	900 m	MPC · JPL
345303	2005 WL_{178}	—	November 30, 2005	Kitt Peak	Spacewatch	MAS	680 m	MPC · JPL
345304	2005 WS_{197}	—	November 21, 2005	Kitt Peak	Spacewatch	3:2	5.3 km	MPC · JPL
345305	2005 WF_{202}	—	November 30, 2005	Kitt Peak	Spacewatch	NYS	1.5 km	MPC · JPL
345306	2005 WO_{204}	—	November 25, 2005	Mount Lemmon	Mount Lemmon Survey	EUN	1.6 km	MPC · JPL
345307	2005 XW_{11}	—	December 1, 2005	Kitt Peak	Spacewatch	V	980 m	MPC · JPL
345308	2005 XA_{23}	—	December 2, 2005	Mount Lemmon	Mount Lemmon Survey	3:2	4.8 km	MPC · JPL
345309	2005 XM_{26}	—	December 4, 2005	Mount Lemmon	Mount Lemmon Survey	NYS	1.5 km	MPC · JPL
345310	2005 XQ_{31}	—	December 2, 2005	Mount Lemmon	Mount Lemmon Survey	·	820 m	MPC · JPL
345311	2005 XU_{37}	—	December 4, 2005	Kitt Peak	Spacewatch	MAS	820 m	MPC · JPL
345312	2005 XD_{38}	—	December 4, 2005	Kitt Peak	Spacewatch	·	1.3 km	MPC · JPL
345313	2005 XZ_{44}	—	December 2, 2005	Kitt Peak	Spacewatch	V	780 m	MPC · JPL
345314	2005 XY_{52}	—	December 2, 2005	Kitt Peak	Spacewatch	·	1.3 km	MPC · JPL
345315	2005 XQ_{86}	—	December 8, 2005	Kitt Peak	Spacewatch	·	910 m	MPC · JPL
345316	2005 XW_{114}	—	December 1, 2005	Kitt Peak	M. W. Buie	·	990 m	MPC · JPL
345317	2005 YL_{6}	—	December 21, 2005	Catalina	CSS	PHO	1.1 km	MPC · JPL
345318	2005 YG_{22}	—	December 24, 2005	Kitt Peak	Spacewatch	·	1.0 km	MPC · JPL
345319	2005 YU_{25}	—	December 24, 2005	Kitt Peak	Spacewatch	·	950 m	MPC · JPL
345320	2005 YY_{25}	—	December 24, 2005	Kitt Peak	Spacewatch	NYS	1.5 km	MPC · JPL
345321	2005 YX_{26}	—	December 22, 2005	Kitt Peak	Spacewatch	·	1.6 km	MPC · JPL
345322	2005 YU_{32}	—	December 22, 2005	Kitt Peak	Spacewatch	NYS	890 m	MPC · JPL
345323	2005 YS_{40}	—	December 25, 2005	Kitt Peak	Spacewatch	·	1.9 km	MPC · JPL
345324	2005 YG_{42}	—	December 22, 2005	Kitt Peak	Spacewatch	NYS	1.2 km	MPC · JPL
345325	2005 YS_{45}	—	December 25, 2005	Kitt Peak	Spacewatch	MAS	690 m	MPC · JPL
345326	2005 YX_{46}	—	December 25, 2005	Kitt Peak	Spacewatch	·	1.2 km	MPC · JPL
345327	2005 YZ_{48}	—	December 22, 2005	Kitt Peak	Spacewatch	fast	1.2 km	MPC · JPL
345328	2005 YS_{91}	—	December 26, 2005	Mount Lemmon	Mount Lemmon Survey	·	1.0 km	MPC · JPL
345329	2005 YP_{96}	—	December 26, 2005	Kitt Peak	Spacewatch	NYS	1.1 km	MPC · JPL
345330	2005 YU_{100}	—	December 24, 2005	Kitt Peak	Spacewatch	·	1.4 km	MPC · JPL
345331	2005 YS_{103}	—	December 25, 2005	Kitt Peak	Spacewatch	NYS	950 m	MPC · JPL
345332	2005 YU_{106}	—	December 25, 2005	Mount Lemmon	Mount Lemmon Survey	·	1.3 km	MPC · JPL
345333	2005 YM_{107}	—	December 25, 2005	Mount Lemmon	Mount Lemmon Survey	V	780 m	MPC · JPL
345334	2005 YD_{111}	—	December 25, 2005	Kitt Peak	Spacewatch	NYS	1.1 km	MPC · JPL
345335	2005 YE_{111}	—	December 25, 2005	Kitt Peak	Spacewatch	CLA	1.5 km	MPC · JPL
345336	2005 YP_{115}	—	December 25, 2005	Kitt Peak	Spacewatch	·	1.5 km	MPC · JPL
345337	2005 YP_{126}	—	December 26, 2005	Kitt Peak	Spacewatch	·	1.5 km	MPC · JPL
345338	2005 YK_{127}	—	December 28, 2005	Palomar	NEAT	PHO	2.7 km	MPC · JPL
345339	2005 YR_{145}	—	December 29, 2005	Socorro	LINEAR	·	1.2 km	MPC · JPL
345340	2005 YK_{160}	—	December 27, 2005	Kitt Peak	Spacewatch	·	1.1 km	MPC · JPL
345341	2005 YL_{167}	—	December 27, 2005	Kitt Peak	Spacewatch	·	1.1 km	MPC · JPL
345342	2005 YE_{175}	—	December 30, 2005	Socorro	LINEAR	·	1.9 km	MPC · JPL
345343	2005 YF_{178}	—	December 24, 2005	Kitt Peak	Spacewatch	·	940 m	MPC · JPL
345344	2005 YG_{179}	—	December 26, 2005	Mount Lemmon	Mount Lemmon Survey	MAS	620 m	MPC · JPL
345345	2005 YL_{179}	—	December 26, 2005	Kitt Peak	Spacewatch	3:2	5.5 km	MPC · JPL
345346	2005 YR_{179}	—	December 27, 2005	Kitt Peak	Spacewatch	CLA	2.0 km	MPC · JPL
345347	2005 YP_{188}	—	December 28, 2005	Mount Lemmon	Mount Lemmon Survey	·	980 m	MPC · JPL
345348	2005 YF_{191}	—	December 30, 2005	Kitt Peak	Spacewatch	MAS	860 m	MPC · JPL
345349	2005 YU_{196}	—	December 24, 2005	Kitt Peak	Spacewatch	·	1.5 km	MPC · JPL
345350	2005 YE_{205}	—	December 26, 2005	Mount Lemmon	Mount Lemmon Survey	MAS	570 m	MPC · JPL
345351	2005 YY_{222}	—	November 12, 2005	Kitt Peak	Spacewatch	·	980 m	MPC · JPL
345352	2005 YC_{268}	—	December 25, 2005	Mount Lemmon	Mount Lemmon Survey	MAS	630 m	MPC · JPL
345353	2005 YP_{272}	—	December 30, 2005	Kitt Peak	Spacewatch	·	950 m	MPC · JPL
345354	2005 YW_{291}	—	December 30, 2005	Mount Lemmon	Mount Lemmon Survey	·	1.6 km	MPC · JPL
345355	2006 AC_{6}	—	January 2, 2006	Socorro	LINEAR	PHO	1.2 km	MPC · JPL
345356	2006 AP_{9}	—	January 4, 2006	Mount Lemmon	Mount Lemmon Survey	·	1.3 km	MPC · JPL
345357	2006 AY_{10}	—	January 4, 2006	Catalina	CSS	PHO	2.0 km	MPC · JPL
345358	2006 AP_{14}	—	January 5, 2006	Mount Lemmon	Mount Lemmon Survey	MAS	610 m	MPC · JPL
345359	2006 AX_{27}	—	January 5, 2006	Catalina	CSS	·	1.4 km	MPC · JPL
345360	2006 AX_{31}	—	January 5, 2006	Catalina	CSS	·	1.4 km	MPC · JPL
345361	2006 AJ_{32}	—	January 5, 2006	Catalina	CSS	·	1.6 km	MPC · JPL
345362	2006 AY_{32}	—	January 6, 2006	Kitt Peak	Spacewatch	NYS	1.3 km	MPC · JPL
345363	2006 AE_{36}	—	January 4, 2006	Kitt Peak	Spacewatch	NYS	1.0 km	MPC · JPL
345364	2006 AA_{49}	—	January 5, 2006	Kitt Peak	Spacewatch	NYS	870 m	MPC · JPL
345365	2006 AK_{70}	—	January 6, 2006	Kitt Peak	Spacewatch	V	790 m	MPC · JPL
345366	2006 AS_{70}	—	January 6, 2006	Kitt Peak	Spacewatch	V	640 m	MPC · JPL
345367	2006 AU_{70}	—	January 6, 2006	Kitt Peak	Spacewatch	3:2 · SHU	4.7 km	MPC · JPL
345368	2006 AY_{70}	—	January 6, 2006	Kitt Peak	Spacewatch	·	1.3 km	MPC · JPL
345369	2006 AN_{71}	—	January 6, 2006	Mount Lemmon	Mount Lemmon Survey	·	1.5 km	MPC · JPL
345370	2006 AS_{88}	—	December 28, 2005	Kitt Peak	Spacewatch	·	1.4 km	MPC · JPL
345371	2006 AE_{96}	—	January 4, 2006	Catalina	CSS	PHO	1.5 km	MPC · JPL
345372	2006 BR_{9}	—	January 22, 2006	Anderson Mesa	LONEOS	·	1.4 km	MPC · JPL
345373	2006 BO_{11}	—	January 20, 2006	Kitt Peak	Spacewatch	·	1.2 km	MPC · JPL
345374	2006 BV_{29}	—	January 23, 2006	Mount Nyukasa	Japan Aerospace Exploration Agency	·	1.4 km	MPC · JPL
345375	2006 BD_{31}	—	January 20, 2006	Kitt Peak	Spacewatch	MAS	690 m	MPC · JPL
345376	2006 BU_{31}	—	January 20, 2006	Kitt Peak	Spacewatch	V	760 m	MPC · JPL
345377	2006 BE_{36}	—	January 23, 2006	Kitt Peak	Spacewatch	·	1.1 km	MPC · JPL
345378	2006 BQ_{38}	—	January 23, 2006	Mount Lemmon	Mount Lemmon Survey	NYS	1.4 km	MPC · JPL
345379	2006 BP_{40}	—	January 21, 2006	Kitt Peak	Spacewatch	·	1.2 km	MPC · JPL
345380	2006 BS_{41}	—	January 22, 2006	Mount Lemmon	Mount Lemmon Survey	·	1.5 km	MPC · JPL
345381	2006 BO_{51}	—	January 25, 2006	Kitt Peak	Spacewatch	·	1.2 km	MPC · JPL
345382	2006 BB_{57}	—	January 22, 2006	Mount Lemmon	Mount Lemmon Survey	MAS	790 m	MPC · JPL
345383	2006 BM_{67}	—	January 23, 2006	Kitt Peak	Spacewatch	MAS	760 m	MPC · JPL
345384	2006 BR_{69}	—	January 23, 2006	Kitt Peak	Spacewatch	·	1.1 km	MPC · JPL
345385	2006 BR_{79}	—	January 23, 2006	Kitt Peak	Spacewatch	·	2.1 km	MPC · JPL
345386	2006 BW_{82}	—	January 24, 2006	Kitt Peak	Spacewatch	·	1.8 km	MPC · JPL
345387	2006 BG_{114}	—	January 25, 2006	Kitt Peak	Spacewatch	·	1.1 km	MPC · JPL
345388	2006 BD_{118}	—	January 26, 2006	Kitt Peak	Spacewatch	AGN	1.3 km	MPC · JPL
345389	2006 BJ_{120}	—	January 26, 2006	Kitt Peak	Spacewatch	·	1.2 km	MPC · JPL
345390	2006 BT_{148}	—	January 22, 2006	Mount Lemmon	Mount Lemmon Survey	NYS	1.3 km	MPC · JPL
345391	2006 BK_{163}	—	January 26, 2006	Mount Lemmon	Mount Lemmon Survey	MAS	690 m	MPC · JPL
345392	2006 BP_{166}	—	January 26, 2006	Mount Lemmon	Mount Lemmon Survey	·	1.1 km	MPC · JPL
345393	2006 BC_{169}	—	January 26, 2006	Mount Lemmon	Mount Lemmon Survey	·	1.5 km	MPC · JPL
345394	2006 BX_{188}	—	January 28, 2006	Kitt Peak	Spacewatch	·	1.4 km	MPC · JPL
345395	2006 BC_{189}	—	January 28, 2006	Kitt Peak	Spacewatch	·	920 m	MPC · JPL
345396	2006 BZ_{191}	—	January 30, 2006	Catalina	CSS	·	2.3 km	MPC · JPL
345397	2006 BE_{196}	—	January 30, 2006	Kitt Peak	Spacewatch	NYS	1.1 km	MPC · JPL
345398	2006 BZ_{206}	—	January 31, 2006	Mount Lemmon	Mount Lemmon Survey	·	1.2 km	MPC · JPL
345399	2006 BP_{208}	—	January 31, 2006	Catalina	CSS	·	1.7 km	MPC · JPL
345400	2006 BJ_{221}	—	January 30, 2006	Kitt Peak	Spacewatch	·	1.2 km	MPC · JPL

== 345401–345500 ==
back to top

Designation			Discovery			Properties		Ref
Permanent	Provisional	Named after	Date	Site	Discoverer(s)	Category	Diam.	Ref
345401	2006 BX_{233}	—	January 31, 2006	Kitt Peak	Spacewatch	·	1 km	MPC · JPL
345402	2006 BX_{246}	—	January 31, 2006	Kitt Peak	Spacewatch	NYS	1.2 km	MPC · JPL
345403	2006 BL_{247}	—	January 31, 2006	Kitt Peak	Spacewatch	·	2.8 km	MPC · JPL
345404	2006 BE_{251}	—	January 31, 2006	Kitt Peak	Spacewatch	MAS	750 m	MPC · JPL
345405	2006 BD_{254}	—	January 31, 2006	Kitt Peak	Spacewatch	MAS	740 m	MPC · JPL
345406	2006 BX_{255}	—	January 31, 2006	Kitt Peak	Spacewatch	NYS	930 m	MPC · JPL
345407	2006 BR_{260}	—	January 31, 2006	Kitt Peak	Spacewatch	L5	12 km	MPC · JPL
345408	2006 BY_{262}	—	January 31, 2006	Kitt Peak	Spacewatch	·	1.6 km	MPC · JPL
345409	2006 CO_{20}	—	February 1, 2006	Kitt Peak	Spacewatch	·	1.3 km	MPC · JPL
345410	2006 CV_{20}	—	February 1, 2006	Mount Lemmon	Mount Lemmon Survey	NYS	1.3 km	MPC · JPL
345411	2006 CW_{35}	—	February 2, 2006	Catalina	CSS	NYS	1.3 km	MPC · JPL
345412	2006 CE_{42}	—	February 2, 2006	Kitt Peak	Spacewatch	·	1.5 km	MPC · JPL
345413	2006 CP_{50}	—	February 3, 2006	Mount Lemmon	Mount Lemmon Survey	·	2.7 km	MPC · JPL
345414	2006 CZ_{66}	—	November 19, 2004	Tucson	R. A. Tucker	T_{j} (2.98) · HIL · 3:2 · (6124)	5.5 km	MPC · JPL
345415	2006 DQ_{8}	—	February 21, 2006	Mount Lemmon	Mount Lemmon Survey	·	1.1 km	MPC · JPL
345416	2006 DV_{17}	—	February 20, 2006	Kitt Peak	Spacewatch	NYS	1.2 km	MPC · JPL
345417	2006 DW_{23}	—	September 7, 2004	Kitt Peak	Spacewatch	MAS	710 m	MPC · JPL
345418	2006 DL_{30}	—	February 20, 2006	Kitt Peak	Spacewatch	(5)	1.4 km	MPC · JPL
345419	2006 DO_{30}	—	February 20, 2006	Kitt Peak	Spacewatch	·	1.5 km	MPC · JPL
345420	2006 DY_{34}	—	February 20, 2006	Kitt Peak	Spacewatch	NYS	980 m	MPC · JPL
345421	2006 DE_{35}	—	February 20, 2006	Kitt Peak	Spacewatch	·	1.1 km	MPC · JPL
345422	2006 DA_{38}	—	February 21, 2006	Anderson Mesa	LONEOS	·	1.6 km	MPC · JPL
345423	2006 DD_{43}	—	February 20, 2006	Kitt Peak	Spacewatch	·	1.4 km	MPC · JPL
345424	2006 DU_{43}	—	February 20, 2006	Kitt Peak	Spacewatch	·	1.3 km	MPC · JPL
345425	2006 DM_{49}	—	February 21, 2006	Mount Lemmon	Mount Lemmon Survey	MAS	640 m	MPC · JPL
345426	2006 DZ_{49}	—	February 22, 2006	Socorro	LINEAR	·	1.6 km	MPC · JPL
345427	2006 DG_{73}	—	February 22, 2006	Mount Lemmon	Mount Lemmon Survey	·	2.2 km	MPC · JPL
345428	2006 DN_{77}	—	February 24, 2006	Kitt Peak	Spacewatch	·	1.6 km	MPC · JPL
345429	2006 DY_{86}	—	February 24, 2006	Kitt Peak	Spacewatch	·	1.3 km	MPC · JPL
345430	2006 DY_{88}	—	February 24, 2006	Kitt Peak	Spacewatch	·	830 m	MPC · JPL
345431	2006 DK_{90}	—	February 24, 2006	Kitt Peak	Spacewatch	·	1.7 km	MPC · JPL
345432	2006 DQ_{93}	—	February 24, 2006	Kitt Peak	Spacewatch	·	1.5 km	MPC · JPL
345433	2006 DL_{98}	—	February 25, 2006	Kitt Peak	Spacewatch	·	1.2 km	MPC · JPL
345434	2006 DP_{105}	—	February 25, 2006	Mount Lemmon	Mount Lemmon Survey	L5	8.1 km	MPC · JPL
345435	2006 DR_{123}	—	February 24, 2006	Mount Lemmon	Mount Lemmon Survey	ADE	2.1 km	MPC · JPL
345436	2006 DB_{132}	—	February 25, 2006	Kitt Peak	Spacewatch	·	1.3 km	MPC · JPL
345437	2006 DK_{140}	—	February 25, 2006	Kitt Peak	Spacewatch	(5)	1.5 km	MPC · JPL
345438	2006 DF_{155}	—	February 25, 2006	Kitt Peak	Spacewatch	·	1.2 km	MPC · JPL
345439	2006 DY_{160}	—	February 27, 2006	Kitt Peak	Spacewatch	NYS	1.4 km	MPC · JPL
345440	2006 DD_{167}	—	February 27, 2006	Kitt Peak	Spacewatch	NYS	1.2 km	MPC · JPL
345441	2006 DN_{176}	—	February 27, 2006	Mount Lemmon	Mount Lemmon Survey	·	1.3 km	MPC · JPL
345442	2006 DE_{182}	—	February 27, 2006	Mount Lemmon	Mount Lemmon Survey	·	1.1 km	MPC · JPL
345443	2006 DO_{211}	—	February 24, 2006	Mount Lemmon	Mount Lemmon Survey	·	1.0 km	MPC · JPL
345444	2006 DV_{216}	—	February 28, 2006	Mount Lemmon	Mount Lemmon Survey	·	2.7 km	MPC · JPL
345445	2006 EO_{3}	—	March 2, 2006	Kitt Peak	Spacewatch	AGN	1.3 km	MPC · JPL
345446	2006 EW_{14}	—	March 2, 2006	Kitt Peak	Spacewatch	MAS	740 m	MPC · JPL
345447	2006 EM_{20}	—	March 3, 2006	Kitt Peak	Spacewatch	·	1.5 km	MPC · JPL
345448	2006 EN_{20}	—	March 3, 2006	Kitt Peak	Spacewatch	·	1.4 km	MPC · JPL
345449	2006 EB_{23}	—	March 3, 2006	Kitt Peak	Spacewatch	·	2.2 km	MPC · JPL
345450	2006 ET_{38}	—	March 4, 2006	Catalina	CSS	·	1.8 km	MPC · JPL
345451	2006 EA_{39}	—	March 4, 2006	Catalina	CSS	·	1.6 km	MPC · JPL
345452	2006 EQ_{40}	—	March 4, 2006	Kitt Peak	Spacewatch	·	1.6 km	MPC · JPL
345453	2006 EX_{40}	—	December 14, 2004	Catalina	CSS	·	2.2 km	MPC · JPL
345454	2006 EA_{45}	—	March 3, 2006	Catalina	CSS	JUN	1.3 km	MPC · JPL
345455	2006 FY	—	March 19, 2006	Socorro	LINEAR	PHO	1.5 km	MPC · JPL
345456	2006 FJ_{1}	—	March 21, 2006	Mount Lemmon	Mount Lemmon Survey	·	1.5 km	MPC · JPL
345457	2006 FG_{2}	—	March 4, 2006	Kitt Peak	Spacewatch	·	1.8 km	MPC · JPL
345458	2006 FG_{6}	—	March 23, 2006	Catalina	CSS	·	1.4 km	MPC · JPL
345459	2006 FX_{10}	—	March 23, 2006	Kitt Peak	Spacewatch	·	2.4 km	MPC · JPL
345460	2006 FS_{35}	—	March 29, 2006	Lulin	Q. Ye	·	2.7 km	MPC · JPL
345461	2006 FC_{37}	—	February 24, 2006	Catalina	CSS	·	1.9 km	MPC · JPL
345462	2006 FY_{39}	—	March 25, 2006	Kitt Peak	Spacewatch	·	1.8 km	MPC · JPL
345463	2006 FU_{51}	—	March 26, 2006	Anderson Mesa	LONEOS	EUN	1.7 km	MPC · JPL
345464	2006 GD_{13}	—	April 2, 2006	Kitt Peak	Spacewatch	·	3.7 km	MPC · JPL
345465	2006 GU_{26}	—	April 2, 2006	Kitt Peak	Spacewatch	·	1.5 km	MPC · JPL
345466	2006 GZ_{28}	—	April 2, 2006	Kitt Peak	Spacewatch	·	1.4 km	MPC · JPL
345467	2006 GB_{36}	—	April 7, 2006	Mount Lemmon	Mount Lemmon Survey	·	2.6 km	MPC · JPL
345468	2006 GG_{42}	—	April 9, 2006	Catalina	CSS	·	3.8 km	MPC · JPL
345469	2006 HU_{10}	—	April 19, 2006	Kitt Peak	Spacewatch	·	1.2 km	MPC · JPL
345470	2006 HU_{15}	—	April 20, 2006	Kitt Peak	Spacewatch	·	1.9 km	MPC · JPL
345471	2006 HJ_{21}	—	April 20, 2006	Kitt Peak	Spacewatch	·	2.7 km	MPC · JPL
345472	2006 HQ_{21}	—	April 20, 2006	Kitt Peak	Spacewatch	·	1.2 km	MPC · JPL
345473	2006 HP_{26}	—	April 20, 2006	Kitt Peak	Spacewatch	·	1.7 km	MPC · JPL
345474	2006 HE_{35}	—	April 19, 2006	Mount Lemmon	Mount Lemmon Survey	·	1.3 km	MPC · JPL
345475	2006 HV_{36}	—	April 20, 2006	Kitt Peak	Spacewatch	H	590 m	MPC · JPL
345476	2006 HM_{48}	—	April 24, 2006	Kitt Peak	Spacewatch	·	380 m	MPC · JPL
345477	2006 HH_{63}	—	April 24, 2006	Kitt Peak	Spacewatch	·	1.3 km	MPC · JPL
345478	2006 HU_{67}	—	April 24, 2006	Mount Lemmon	Mount Lemmon Survey	·	1.7 km	MPC · JPL
345479	2006 HN_{76}	—	April 25, 2006	Kitt Peak	Spacewatch	·	2.9 km	MPC · JPL
345480	2006 HY_{80}	—	April 26, 2006	Kitt Peak	Spacewatch	·	2.0 km	MPC · JPL
345481	2006 HN_{83}	—	April 26, 2006	Kitt Peak	Spacewatch	·	2.4 km	MPC · JPL
345482	2006 HT_{88}	—	April 30, 2006	Catalina	CSS	JUN	1.7 km	MPC · JPL
345483	2006 HG_{91}	—	April 29, 2006	Kitt Peak	Spacewatch	·	2.0 km	MPC · JPL
345484	2006 HU_{98}	—	April 30, 2006	Kitt Peak	Spacewatch	·	1.6 km	MPC · JPL
345485	2006 HL_{100}	—	April 30, 2006	Kitt Peak	Spacewatch	HOF	2.5 km	MPC · JPL
345486	2006 HN_{101}	—	April 30, 2006	Kitt Peak	Spacewatch	·	2.0 km	MPC · JPL
345487	2006 HP_{103}	—	April 30, 2006	Kitt Peak	Spacewatch	·	2.4 km	MPC · JPL
345488	2006 HY_{110}	—	April 21, 2006	Kitt Peak	Spacewatch	·	1.6 km	MPC · JPL
345489	2006 HO_{119}	—	April 8, 2006	Kitt Peak	Spacewatch	MAR	1.2 km	MPC · JPL
345490	2006 JV	—	May 4, 2006	Mount Lemmon	Mount Lemmon Survey	·	1.5 km	MPC · JPL
345491	2006 JF_{1}	—	May 1, 2006	Kitt Peak	Spacewatch	·	1.2 km	MPC · JPL
345492	2006 JY_{1}	—	May 1, 2006	Socorro	LINEAR	·	2.0 km	MPC · JPL
345493	2006 JY_{2}	—	May 2, 2006	Mount Lemmon	Mount Lemmon Survey	·	1.6 km	MPC · JPL
345494	2006 JK_{11}	—	May 1, 2006	Kitt Peak	Spacewatch	·	1.7 km	MPC · JPL
345495	2006 JS_{11}	—	May 1, 2006	Kitt Peak	Spacewatch	·	2.9 km	MPC · JPL
345496	2006 JO_{16}	—	May 2, 2006	Kitt Peak	Spacewatch	·	1.4 km	MPC · JPL
345497	2006 JU_{28}	—	May 3, 2006	Kitt Peak	Spacewatch	ADE	1.8 km	MPC · JPL
345498	2006 JX_{29}	—	May 3, 2006	Kitt Peak	Spacewatch	·	1.8 km	MPC · JPL
345499	2006 JF_{32}	—	April 25, 2006	Kitt Peak	Spacewatch	·	1.7 km	MPC · JPL
345500	2006 JB_{35}	—	May 4, 2006	Kitt Peak	Spacewatch	·	2.1 km	MPC · JPL

== 345501–345600 ==
back to top

Designation			Discovery			Properties		Ref
Permanent	Provisional	Named after	Date	Site	Discoverer(s)	Category	Diam.	Ref
345501	2006 JH_{37}	—	May 5, 2006	Kitt Peak	Spacewatch	·	2.7 km	MPC · JPL
345502	2006 JW_{40}	—	November 21, 2003	Kitt Peak	Spacewatch	·	2.2 km	MPC · JPL
345503	2006 JJ_{44}	—	May 6, 2006	Kitt Peak	Spacewatch	·	2.3 km	MPC · JPL
345504	2006 JU_{48}	—	May 8, 2006	Siding Spring	SSS	·	2.9 km	MPC · JPL
345505	2006 JO_{53}	—	May 6, 2006	Mount Lemmon	Mount Lemmon Survey	·	2.9 km	MPC · JPL
345506	2006 JG_{54}	—	May 8, 2006	Mount Lemmon	Mount Lemmon Survey	·	2.6 km	MPC · JPL
345507	2006 JT_{55}	—	May 1, 2006	Catalina	CSS	·	2.5 km	MPC · JPL
345508	2006 JX_{67}	—	May 1, 2006	Kitt Peak	M. W. Buie	·	2.0 km	MPC · JPL
345509	2006 JV_{80}	—	May 4, 2006	Kitt Peak	Spacewatch	·	1.9 km	MPC · JPL
345510	2006 KG	—	May 16, 2006	Palomar	NEAT	H	520 m	MPC · JPL
345511	2006 KR_{2}	—	September 14, 2002	Palomar	NEAT	·	4.0 km	MPC · JPL
345512	2006 KW_{14}	—	May 20, 2006	Anderson Mesa	LONEOS	EUN	1.6 km	MPC · JPL
345513	2006 KE_{25}	—	May 19, 2006	Mount Lemmon	Mount Lemmon Survey	·	2.1 km	MPC · JPL
345514	2006 KU_{32}	—	May 20, 2006	Kitt Peak	Spacewatch	·	2.1 km	MPC · JPL
345515	2006 KS_{40}	—	April 9, 2006	Mount Lemmon	Mount Lemmon Survey	H	440 m	MPC · JPL
345516	2006 KT_{46}	—	May 21, 2006	Mount Lemmon	Mount Lemmon Survey	·	1.5 km	MPC · JPL
345517	2006 KS_{51}	—	May 21, 2006	Kitt Peak	Spacewatch	·	2.0 km	MPC · JPL
345518	2006 KT_{56}	—	May 22, 2006	Kitt Peak	Spacewatch	KON	3.4 km	MPC · JPL
345519	2006 KA_{58}	—	May 22, 2006	Kitt Peak	Spacewatch	EUN	1.3 km	MPC · JPL
345520	2006 KG_{69}	—	May 22, 2006	Kitt Peak	Spacewatch	·	2.6 km	MPC · JPL
345521	2006 KK_{72}	—	May 22, 2006	Kitt Peak	Spacewatch	·	2.2 km	MPC · JPL
345522	2006 KN_{73}	—	May 23, 2006	Kitt Peak	Spacewatch	EOS	2.1 km	MPC · JPL
345523	2006 KP_{88}	—	May 24, 2006	Kitt Peak	Spacewatch	·	2.2 km	MPC · JPL
345524	2006 KM_{102}	—	May 27, 2006	Kitt Peak	Spacewatch	·	2.7 km	MPC · JPL
345525	2006 KQ_{108}	—	May 31, 2006	Mount Lemmon	Mount Lemmon Survey	·	1.3 km	MPC · JPL
345526	2006 LT_{3}	—	November 19, 2003	Palomar	NEAT	WIT	1.4 km	MPC · JPL
345527	2006 LB_{5}	—	May 23, 2006	Kitt Peak	Spacewatch	·	2.8 km	MPC · JPL
345528	2006 MG_{6}	—	June 19, 2006	Mount Lemmon	Mount Lemmon Survey	H	820 m	MPC · JPL
345529	2006 NS	—	June 24, 2006	Palomar	NEAT	·	8.6 km	MPC · JPL
345530	2006 OC_{6}	—	May 26, 2006	Catalina	CSS	·	2.9 km	MPC · JPL
345531	2006 OV_{12}	—	July 20, 2006	Palomar	NEAT	H	740 m	MPC · JPL
345532	2006 PF_{4}	—	August 15, 2006	Reedy Creek	J. Broughton	·	3.2 km	MPC · JPL
345533	2006 QL_{9}	—	August 19, 2006	Kitt Peak	Spacewatch	·	5.6 km	MPC · JPL
345534	2006 QQ_{27}	—	August 20, 2006	Kitt Peak	Spacewatch	EOS	2.5 km	MPC · JPL
345535	2006 QX_{69}	—	August 21, 2006	Kitt Peak	Spacewatch	·	2.8 km	MPC · JPL
345536	2006 QE_{77}	—	August 21, 2006	Kitt Peak	Spacewatch	·	4.3 km	MPC · JPL
345537	2006 QK_{79}	—	August 24, 2006	Eskridge	Farpoint	·	2.5 km	MPC · JPL
345538	2006 QG_{83}	—	August 27, 2006	Kitt Peak	Spacewatch	EOS	2.1 km	MPC · JPL
345539	2006 QU_{85}	—	September 21, 2001	Kitt Peak	Spacewatch	·	2.1 km	MPC · JPL
345540	2006 QY_{99}	—	August 24, 2006	Socorro	LINEAR	·	5.1 km	MPC · JPL
345541	2006 QN_{104}	—	August 28, 2006	Anderson Mesa	LONEOS	·	4.1 km	MPC · JPL
345542	2006 QB_{105}	—	August 28, 2006	Catalina	CSS	·	2.3 km	MPC · JPL
345543	2006 QT_{112}	—	August 24, 2006	Socorro	LINEAR	·	3.3 km	MPC · JPL
345544	2006 QW_{134}	—	August 27, 2006	Anderson Mesa	LONEOS	EOS	2.7 km	MPC · JPL
345545	2006 QC_{147}	—	February 23, 1998	Kitt Peak	Spacewatch	·	3.2 km	MPC · JPL
345546	2006 QE_{148}	—	August 18, 2006	Kitt Peak	Spacewatch	THM	2.5 km	MPC · JPL
345547	2006 QB_{184}	—	August 19, 2006	Kitt Peak	Spacewatch	·	2.3 km	MPC · JPL
345548	2006 QS_{187}	—	August 30, 2006	Anderson Mesa	LONEOS	EOS	2.6 km	MPC · JPL
345549	2006 RR_{4}	—	September 12, 2006	Catalina	CSS	CYB	4.1 km	MPC · JPL
345550	2006 RP_{13}	—	September 14, 2006	Kitt Peak	Spacewatch	·	3.2 km	MPC · JPL
345551	2006 RV_{15}	—	September 14, 2006	Catalina	CSS	·	3.4 km	MPC · JPL
345552	2006 RW_{16}	—	September 14, 2006	Catalina	CSS	·	3.4 km	MPC · JPL
345553	2006 RW_{21}	—	September 15, 2006	Catalina	CSS	·	4.9 km	MPC · JPL
345554	2006 RT_{31}	—	September 15, 2006	Kitt Peak	Spacewatch	·	2.5 km	MPC · JPL
345555	2006 RT_{32}	—	September 15, 2006	Catalina	CSS	T_{j} (2.93)	3.4 km	MPC · JPL
345556	2006 RR_{36}	—	August 15, 2006	Palomar	NEAT	·	3.7 km	MPC · JPL
345557	2006 RZ_{40}	—	September 14, 2006	Kitt Peak	Spacewatch	LIX	3.6 km	MPC · JPL
345558	2006 RP_{42}	—	September 14, 2006	Kitt Peak	Spacewatch	THM	2.7 km	MPC · JPL
345559	2006 RK_{61}	—	September 11, 2006	Catalina	CSS	·	7.6 km	MPC · JPL
345560	2006 RK_{64}	—	September 13, 2006	Palomar	NEAT	·	2.4 km	MPC · JPL
345561	2006 RG_{69}	—	September 15, 2006	Kitt Peak	Spacewatch	·	4.7 km	MPC · JPL
345562	2006 RO_{71}	—	September 15, 2006	Kitt Peak	Spacewatch	·	3.0 km	MPC · JPL
345563	2006 RY_{74}	—	September 15, 2006	Kitt Peak	Spacewatch	THM	1.9 km	MPC · JPL
345564	2006 RG_{77}	—	September 15, 2006	Kitt Peak	Spacewatch	·	3.1 km	MPC · JPL
345565	2006 RC_{80}	—	September 15, 2006	Kitt Peak	Spacewatch	·	2.7 km	MPC · JPL
345566	2006 RL_{81}	—	September 15, 2006	Kitt Peak	Spacewatch	·	3.0 km	MPC · JPL
345567	2006 RV_{81}	—	September 15, 2006	Kitt Peak	Spacewatch	THM	2.1 km	MPC · JPL
345568	2006 RH_{85}	—	September 15, 2006	Kitt Peak	Spacewatch	·	3.3 km	MPC · JPL
345569	2006 RN_{92}	—	September 15, 2006	Kitt Peak	Spacewatch	HYG	2.5 km	MPC · JPL
345570	2006 RE_{100}	—	February 22, 2003	Palomar	NEAT	EOS	2.6 km	MPC · JPL
345571	2006 RR_{103}	—	September 11, 2006	Apache Point	A. C. Becker	·	2.8 km	MPC · JPL
345572	2006 RW_{104}	—	September 14, 2006	Kitt Peak	Spacewatch	·	3.2 km	MPC · JPL
345573	2006 RS_{112}	—	September 14, 2006	Mauna Kea	Masiero, J.	·	3.5 km	MPC · JPL
345574 Michael	2006 RN_{117}	Michael	September 14, 2006	Mauna Kea	Masiero, J.	·	3.1 km	MPC · JPL
345575	2006 SP	—	September 16, 2006	Catalina	CSS	·	3.0 km	MPC · JPL
345576	2006 SU_{7}	—	September 16, 2006	Anderson Mesa	LONEOS	EOS	2.4 km	MPC · JPL
345577	2006 SD_{8}	—	September 16, 2006	Catalina	CSS	·	5.2 km	MPC · JPL
345578	2006 SZ_{15}	—	September 17, 2006	Catalina	CSS	·	3.7 km	MPC · JPL
345579	2006 SU_{17}	—	September 17, 2006	Kitt Peak	Spacewatch	·	3.3 km	MPC · JPL
345580	2006 SG_{20}	—	September 16, 2006	Catalina	CSS	·	3.4 km	MPC · JPL
345581	2006 SG_{27}	—	September 16, 2006	Catalina	CSS	EOS	3.1 km	MPC · JPL
345582	2006 SL_{29}	—	September 17, 2006	Kitt Peak	Spacewatch	·	2.9 km	MPC · JPL
345583	2006 SS_{38}	—	September 18, 2006	Kitt Peak	Spacewatch	·	2.7 km	MPC · JPL
345584	2006 SX_{46}	—	September 19, 2006	Catalina	CSS	·	3.9 km	MPC · JPL
345585	2006 SQ_{49}	—	September 20, 2006	Cordell-Lorenz	Cordell-Lorenz	BRA	2.1 km	MPC · JPL
345586	2006 SC_{51}	—	September 17, 2006	Catalina	CSS	·	3.7 km	MPC · JPL
345587	2006 SJ_{56}	—	September 19, 2006	Catalina	CSS	·	3.9 km	MPC · JPL
345588	2006 SA_{58}	—	September 18, 2006	Kitt Peak	Spacewatch	·	3.2 km	MPC · JPL
345589	2006 SJ_{63}	—	September 20, 2006	Palomar	NEAT	·	3.7 km	MPC · JPL
345590	2006 SN_{66}	—	September 19, 2006	Kitt Peak	Spacewatch	·	3.5 km	MPC · JPL
345591	2006 SF_{70}	—	September 19, 2006	Kitt Peak	Spacewatch	·	2.6 km	MPC · JPL
345592	2006 SC_{72}	—	September 19, 2006	Kitt Peak	Spacewatch	THM	2.3 km	MPC · JPL
345593	2006 SG_{75}	—	September 19, 2006	Kitt Peak	Spacewatch	THM	3.2 km	MPC · JPL
345594	2006 SV_{82}	—	September 18, 2006	Kitt Peak	Spacewatch	EOS	2.2 km	MPC · JPL
345595	2006 SQ_{89}	—	September 18, 2006	Kitt Peak	Spacewatch	VER	2.9 km	MPC · JPL
345596	2006 SP_{95}	—	September 18, 2006	Kitt Peak	Spacewatch	THM	2.3 km	MPC · JPL
345597	2006 SK_{99}	—	September 18, 2006	Kitt Peak	Spacewatch	·	4.2 km	MPC · JPL
345598	2006 SN_{102}	—	September 19, 2006	Kitt Peak	Spacewatch	·	3.0 km	MPC · JPL
345599	2006 SE_{118}	—	September 24, 2006	Kitt Peak	Spacewatch	LIX	3.9 km	MPC · JPL
345600	2006 SJ_{121}	—	September 18, 2006	Anderson Mesa	LONEOS	·	3.1 km	MPC · JPL

== 345601–345700 ==
back to top

Designation			Discovery			Properties		Ref
Permanent	Provisional	Named after	Date	Site	Discoverer(s)	Category	Diam.	Ref
345601	2006 SR_{125}	—	September 20, 2006	Catalina	CSS	·	3.4 km	MPC · JPL
345602	2006 SC_{132}	—	September 16, 2006	Catalina	CSS	·	4.3 km	MPC · JPL
345603	2006 SC_{139}	—	September 21, 2006	Anderson Mesa	LONEOS	·	3.4 km	MPC · JPL
345604	2006 SH_{155}	—	September 22, 2006	Catalina	CSS	·	3.5 km	MPC · JPL
345605	2006 SM_{165}	—	September 25, 2006	Kitt Peak	Spacewatch	·	3.2 km	MPC · JPL
345606	2006 SU_{165}	—	September 25, 2006	Kitt Peak	Spacewatch	·	2.6 km	MPC · JPL
345607	2006 SP_{171}	—	September 25, 2006	Kitt Peak	Spacewatch	KOR	1.9 km	MPC · JPL
345608	2006 SD_{178}	—	September 25, 2006	Mount Lemmon	Mount Lemmon Survey	THM	2.3 km	MPC · JPL
345609	2006 SN_{182}	—	September 25, 2006	Mount Lemmon	Mount Lemmon Survey	·	3.5 km	MPC · JPL
345610	2006 SV_{191}	—	September 26, 2006	Mount Lemmon	Mount Lemmon Survey	·	3.3 km	MPC · JPL
345611	2006 SF_{205}	—	September 25, 2006	Mount Lemmon	Mount Lemmon Survey	·	2.9 km	MPC · JPL
345612	2006 SS_{205}	—	September 25, 2006	Mount Lemmon	Mount Lemmon Survey	·	2.2 km	MPC · JPL
345613	2006 SC_{207}	—	September 25, 2006	Kitt Peak	Spacewatch	·	3.5 km	MPC · JPL
345614	2006 SZ_{209}	—	September 26, 2006	Mount Lemmon	Mount Lemmon Survey	·	3.0 km	MPC · JPL
345615	2006 SV_{213}	—	September 27, 2006	Catalina	CSS	·	3.2 km	MPC · JPL
345616	2006 SF_{215}	—	September 27, 2006	Kitt Peak	Spacewatch	·	4.0 km	MPC · JPL
345617	2006 SP_{226}	—	September 26, 2006	Kitt Peak	Spacewatch	VER	2.8 km	MPC · JPL
345618	2006 SC_{228}	—	September 26, 2006	Kitt Peak	Spacewatch	VER	2.1 km	MPC · JPL
345619	2006 SA_{242}	—	September 26, 2006	Kitt Peak	Spacewatch	THM	2.0 km	MPC · JPL
345620	2006 SX_{244}	—	September 26, 2006	Kitt Peak	Spacewatch	·	4.6 km	MPC · JPL
345621	2006 SV_{247}	—	September 26, 2006	Mount Lemmon	Mount Lemmon Survey	·	2.3 km	MPC · JPL
345622	2006 SX_{253}	—	September 26, 2006	Mount Lemmon	Mount Lemmon Survey	THM	2.4 km	MPC · JPL
345623	2006 SV_{258}	—	September 26, 2006	Kitt Peak	Spacewatch	·	3.2 km	MPC · JPL
345624	2006 SY_{265}	—	September 26, 2006	Kitt Peak	Spacewatch	(1298)	6.4 km	MPC · JPL
345625	2006 SM_{283}	—	September 26, 2006	Socorro	LINEAR	·	4.5 km	MPC · JPL
345626	2006 SO_{283}	—	September 26, 2006	Socorro	LINEAR	·	4.3 km	MPC · JPL
345627	2006 SE_{287}	—	September 22, 2006	Anderson Mesa	LONEOS	·	3.3 km	MPC · JPL
345628	2006 SO_{300}	—	September 26, 2006	Catalina	CSS	·	2.8 km	MPC · JPL
345629	2006 SV_{300}	—	September 26, 2006	Kitt Peak	Spacewatch	·	3.9 km	MPC · JPL
345630	2006 SJ_{310}	—	September 27, 2006	Kitt Peak	Spacewatch	·	3.3 km	MPC · JPL
345631	2006 SU_{311}	—	September 27, 2006	Kitt Peak	Spacewatch	·	3.6 km	MPC · JPL
345632	2006 SM_{313}	—	September 27, 2006	Kitt Peak	Spacewatch	·	3.8 km	MPC · JPL
345633	2006 SS_{314}	—	September 27, 2006	Kitt Peak	Spacewatch	·	4.6 km	MPC · JPL
345634	2006 SD_{322}	—	September 27, 2006	Kitt Peak	Spacewatch	VER	3.8 km	MPC · JPL
345635	2006 SV_{338}	—	September 28, 2006	Kitt Peak	Spacewatch	VER	3.1 km	MPC · JPL
345636	2006 SJ_{349}	—	September 29, 2006	Anderson Mesa	LONEOS	LIX	4.0 km	MPC · JPL
345637	2006 SE_{350}	—	October 28, 1995	Kitt Peak	Spacewatch	·	2.7 km	MPC · JPL
345638	2006 SN_{354}	—	September 30, 2006	Socorro	LINEAR	·	3.7 km	MPC · JPL
345639	2006 SX_{364}	—	September 30, 2006	Catalina	CSS	EOS	2.7 km	MPC · JPL
345640	2006 SJ_{365}	—	September 30, 2006	Catalina	CSS	·	3.9 km	MPC · JPL
345641	2006 SV_{373}	—	September 16, 2006	Apache Point	A. C. Becker	·	2.7 km	MPC · JPL
345642	2006 SE_{374}	—	September 16, 2006	Apache Point	A. C. Becker	·	2.9 km	MPC · JPL
345643	2006 ST_{383}	—	September 29, 2006	Apache Point	A. C. Becker	·	3.4 km	MPC · JPL
345644	2006 SB_{385}	—	September 29, 2006	Apache Point	A. C. Becker	·	3.0 km	MPC · JPL
345645	2006 SC_{385}	—	September 29, 2006	Apache Point	A. C. Becker	·	4.1 km	MPC · JPL
345646	2006 TN	—	October 2, 2006	Mount Lemmon	Mount Lemmon Survey	AMO	410 m	MPC · JPL
345647	2006 TV_{4}	—	October 2, 2006	Mount Lemmon	Mount Lemmon Survey	THB	3.2 km	MPC · JPL
345648 Adyendre	2006 TZ_{6}	Adyendre	October 1, 2006	Piszkéstető	K. Sárneczky, B. Csák	VER	3.2 km	MPC · JPL
345649	2006 TD_{7}	—	October 10, 2006	Farra d'Isonzo	Farra d'Isonzo	·	2.8 km	MPC · JPL
345650	2006 TZ_{14}	—	October 11, 2006	Kitt Peak	Spacewatch	·	4.3 km	MPC · JPL
345651	2006 TV_{20}	—	October 11, 2006	Kitt Peak	Spacewatch	·	3.7 km	MPC · JPL
345652	2006 TJ_{22}	—	October 11, 2006	Kitt Peak	Spacewatch	·	3.8 km	MPC · JPL
345653	2006 TH_{31}	—	October 12, 2006	Kitt Peak	Spacewatch	·	4.3 km	MPC · JPL
345654	2006 TS_{41}	—	October 12, 2006	Palomar	NEAT	·	3.2 km	MPC · JPL
345655	2006 TE_{60}	—	October 13, 2006	Kitt Peak	Spacewatch	·	5.4 km	MPC · JPL
345656	2006 TF_{68}	—	October 11, 2006	Palomar	NEAT	·	4.1 km	MPC · JPL
345657	2006 TD_{73}	—	October 11, 2006	Palomar	NEAT	·	720 m	MPC · JPL
345658	2006 TZ_{77}	—	October 12, 2006	Palomar	NEAT	·	2.5 km	MPC · JPL
345659	2006 TM_{82}	—	October 13, 2006	Kitt Peak	Spacewatch	VER	3.2 km	MPC · JPL
345660	2006 TK_{92}	—	October 14, 2006	Lulin	Lin, C.-S., Q. Ye	HYG	3.3 km	MPC · JPL
345661	2006 TH_{103}	—	October 15, 2006	Kitt Peak	Spacewatch	·	3.8 km	MPC · JPL
345662	2006 TF_{117}	—	October 3, 2006	Apache Point	A. C. Becker	·	3.0 km	MPC · JPL
345663	2006 TP_{118}	—	October 3, 2006	Apache Point	A. C. Becker	·	3.1 km	MPC · JPL
345664	2006 TK_{128}	—	October 11, 2006	Palomar	NEAT	·	3.0 km	MPC · JPL
345665	2006 UX_{2}	—	October 16, 2006	Catalina	CSS	·	3.3 km	MPC · JPL
345666	2006 UJ_{9}	—	October 16, 2006	Kitt Peak	Spacewatch	·	3.9 km	MPC · JPL
345667	2006 US_{18}	—	October 16, 2006	Kitt Peak	Spacewatch	·	870 m	MPC · JPL
345668	2006 UH_{20}	—	October 16, 2006	Kitt Peak	Spacewatch	HYG	3.6 km	MPC · JPL
345669	2006 UM_{25}	—	October 16, 2006	Kitt Peak	Spacewatch	·	3.4 km	MPC · JPL
345670	2006 UX_{26}	—	October 16, 2006	Kitt Peak	Spacewatch	HYG	3.6 km	MPC · JPL
345671	2006 UL_{29}	—	October 16, 2006	Kitt Peak	Spacewatch	·	3.2 km	MPC · JPL
345672	2006 UN_{56}	—	October 18, 2006	Kitt Peak	Spacewatch	EOS	2.2 km	MPC · JPL
345673	2006 UT_{56}	—	September 17, 2006	Catalina	CSS	·	3.5 km	MPC · JPL
345674	2006 UU_{67}	—	October 16, 2006	Catalina	CSS	EOS	2.5 km	MPC · JPL
345675	2006 UQ_{68}	—	October 16, 2006	Catalina	CSS	·	3.6 km	MPC · JPL
345676	2006 UK_{70}	—	October 16, 2006	Kitt Peak	Spacewatch	·	4.0 km	MPC · JPL
345677	2006 UY_{73}	—	September 26, 2006	Kitt Peak	Spacewatch	·	3.5 km	MPC · JPL
345678	2006 UQ_{97}	—	October 18, 2006	Kitt Peak	Spacewatch	·	4.1 km	MPC · JPL
345679	2006 UL_{100}	—	October 18, 2006	Kitt Peak	Spacewatch	·	2.7 km	MPC · JPL
345680	2006 UK_{109}	—	October 19, 2006	Kitt Peak	Spacewatch	·	2.5 km	MPC · JPL
345681	2006 UZ_{112}	—	October 19, 2006	Kitt Peak	Spacewatch	HYG	2.6 km	MPC · JPL
345682	2006 UZ_{118}	—	October 19, 2006	Kitt Peak	Spacewatch	VER	2.5 km	MPC · JPL
345683	2006 UL_{119}	—	October 15, 2006	Kitt Peak	Spacewatch	·	4.1 km	MPC · JPL
345684	2006 UX_{141}	—	October 19, 2006	Kitt Peak	Spacewatch	·	1.0 km	MPC · JPL
345685	2006 UX_{146}	—	October 20, 2006	Kitt Peak	Spacewatch	·	3.8 km	MPC · JPL
345686	2006 UT_{147}	—	October 20, 2006	Kitt Peak	Spacewatch	·	2.9 km	MPC · JPL
345687	2006 UV_{149}	—	October 20, 2006	Catalina	CSS	·	5.2 km	MPC · JPL
345688	2006 UG_{154}	—	October 21, 2006	Catalina	CSS	·	2.8 km	MPC · JPL
345689	2006 UP_{162}	—	October 21, 2006	Mount Lemmon	Mount Lemmon Survey	·	3.2 km	MPC · JPL
345690	2006 UG_{166}	—	October 21, 2006	Mount Lemmon	Mount Lemmon Survey	·	3.0 km	MPC · JPL
345691	2006 UK_{169}	—	October 21, 2006	Mount Lemmon	Mount Lemmon Survey	·	3.3 km	MPC · JPL
345692	2006 UT_{176}	—	October 16, 2006	Catalina	CSS	·	3.3 km	MPC · JPL
345693	2006 UW_{186}	—	October 19, 2006	Catalina	CSS	·	3.2 km	MPC · JPL
345694	2006 UU_{187}	—	October 19, 2006	Catalina	CSS	·	3.7 km	MPC · JPL
345695	2006 UT_{188}	—	September 17, 2006	Catalina	CSS	EUP	4.8 km	MPC · JPL
345696	2006 UN_{190}	—	October 19, 2006	Catalina	CSS	·	5.5 km	MPC · JPL
345697	2006 UU_{222}	—	October 17, 2006	Catalina	CSS	VER	3.6 km	MPC · JPL
345698	2006 UN_{243}	—	October 27, 2006	Mount Lemmon	Mount Lemmon Survey	·	2.8 km	MPC · JPL
345699	2006 UZ_{250}	—	October 27, 2006	Mount Lemmon	Mount Lemmon Survey	(11097) · CYB	2.6 km	MPC · JPL
345700	2006 UX_{263}	—	October 27, 2006	Kitt Peak	Spacewatch	·	6.0 km	MPC · JPL

== 345701–345800 ==
back to top

Designation			Discovery			Properties		Ref
Permanent	Provisional	Named after	Date	Site	Discoverer(s)	Category	Diam.	Ref
345701	2006 UZ_{331}	—	September 14, 2006	Kitt Peak	Spacewatch	·	2.6 km	MPC · JPL
345702	2006 UL_{357}	—	October 27, 2006	Mauna Kea	P. A. Wiegert	·	3.0 km	MPC · JPL
345703	2006 UF_{359}	—	October 21, 2006	Kitt Peak	Spacewatch	·	3.2 km	MPC · JPL
345704	2006 VE_{3}	—	November 9, 2006	Kitt Peak	Spacewatch	·	800 m	MPC · JPL
345705	2006 VB_{14}	—	November 15, 2006	Catalina	CSS	ATE	410 m	MPC · JPL
345706	2006 VX_{16}	—	November 9, 2006	Kitt Peak	Spacewatch	·	4.1 km	MPC · JPL
345707	2006 VW_{51}	—	September 14, 2006	Kitt Peak	Spacewatch	THM	2.6 km	MPC · JPL
345708	2006 VH_{115}	—	November 14, 2006	Kitt Peak	Spacewatch	·	2.9 km	MPC · JPL
345709	2006 VZ_{130}	—	November 15, 2006	Catalina	CSS	·	4.5 km	MPC · JPL
345710	2006 VP_{140}	—	November 15, 2006	Kitt Peak	Spacewatch	THM	2.7 km	MPC · JPL
345711	2006 VC_{150}	—	November 9, 2006	Palomar	NEAT	VER	3.7 km	MPC · JPL
345712	2006 VV_{170}	—	November 1, 2006	Kitt Peak	Spacewatch	·	3.1 km	MPC · JPL
345713	2006 WC_{27}	—	November 18, 2006	Socorro	LINEAR	TIR	3.3 km	MPC · JPL
345714	2006 WA_{73}	—	November 18, 2006	Kitt Peak	Spacewatch	·	2.9 km	MPC · JPL
345715	2006 WF_{115}	—	November 20, 2006	Socorro	LINEAR	CYB	4.6 km	MPC · JPL
345716	2006 WP_{178}	—	November 24, 2006	Mount Lemmon	Mount Lemmon Survey	·	2.9 km	MPC · JPL
345717	2006 WD_{180}	—	November 10, 2006	Kitt Peak	Spacewatch	·	3.3 km	MPC · JPL
345718	2006 XB_{6}	—	December 8, 2006	Palomar	NEAT	·	4.1 km	MPC · JPL
345719	2006 XT_{10}	—	December 9, 2006	Kitt Peak	Spacewatch	·	6.6 km	MPC · JPL
345720 Monte Vigese	2006 XC_{44}	Monte Vigese	December 12, 2006	San Marcello	L. Tesi, M.T. Mazzucato	·	940 m	MPC · JPL
345721	2006 YZ_{51}	—	December 27, 2006	Mount Lemmon	Mount Lemmon Survey	·	1.5 km	MPC · JPL
345722	2007 BG_{29}	—	January 21, 2007	Socorro	LINEAR	ATE +1km	650 m	MPC · JPL
345723	2007 BB_{40}	—	January 24, 2007	Mount Lemmon	Mount Lemmon Survey	·	650 m	MPC · JPL
345724	2007 BW_{44}	—	January 25, 2007	Catalina	CSS	·	810 m	MPC · JPL
345725	2007 BC_{61}	—	January 27, 2007	Mount Lemmon	Mount Lemmon Survey	·	580 m	MPC · JPL
345726	2007 BH_{79}	—	January 27, 2007	Kitt Peak	Spacewatch	·	1.1 km	MPC · JPL
345727	2007 CV_{17}	—	January 9, 2007	Kitt Peak	Spacewatch	·	850 m	MPC · JPL
345728	2007 CF_{35}	—	February 6, 2007	Kitt Peak	Spacewatch	·	1.1 km	MPC · JPL
345729	2007 CS_{43}	—	February 8, 2007	Kitt Peak	Spacewatch	(2076)	750 m	MPC · JPL
345730	2007 CZ_{43}	—	February 8, 2007	Kitt Peak	Spacewatch	·	810 m	MPC · JPL
345731	2007 CV_{56}	—	February 15, 2007	Catalina	CSS	·	920 m	MPC · JPL
345732	2007 CR_{65}	—	February 10, 2007	Mount Lemmon	Mount Lemmon Survey	·	840 m	MPC · JPL
345733	2007 DB_{6}	—	February 17, 2007	Kitt Peak	Spacewatch	·	960 m	MPC · JPL
345734	2007 DD_{11}	—	August 31, 2005	Kitt Peak	Spacewatch	·	820 m	MPC · JPL
345735	2007 DV_{23}	—	February 17, 2007	Kitt Peak	Spacewatch	·	750 m	MPC · JPL
345736	2007 DY_{45}	—	February 21, 2007	Bergisch Gladbach	W. Bickel	·	800 m	MPC · JPL
345737	2007 DZ_{52}	—	February 19, 2007	Mount Lemmon	Mount Lemmon Survey	JUN	1.1 km	MPC · JPL
345738	2007 DB_{64}	—	February 21, 2007	Kitt Peak	Spacewatch	·	1.5 km	MPC · JPL
345739	2007 DS_{67}	—	February 21, 2007	Kitt Peak	Spacewatch	MAS	790 m	MPC · JPL
345740	2007 DN_{72}	—	August 21, 2004	Siding Spring	SSS	NYS	1.1 km	MPC · JPL
345741	2007 DC_{93}	—	February 23, 2007	Socorro	LINEAR	·	870 m	MPC · JPL
345742	2007 DJ_{105}	—	February 27, 2007	Kitt Peak	Spacewatch	·	710 m	MPC · JPL
345743	2007 DC_{106}	—	February 23, 2007	Mount Lemmon	Mount Lemmon Survey	·	990 m	MPC · JPL
345744	2007 DU_{111}	—	February 25, 2007	Mount Lemmon	Mount Lemmon Survey	·	1.6 km	MPC · JPL
345745	2007 DT_{113}	—	February 22, 2007	Kitt Peak	Spacewatch	V	690 m	MPC · JPL
345746	2007 EA_{3}	—	March 9, 2007	Catalina	CSS	·	1.0 km	MPC · JPL
345747	2007 EE_{5}	—	March 9, 2007	Mount Lemmon	Mount Lemmon Survey	·	570 m	MPC · JPL
345748	2007 EV_{10}	—	March 9, 2007	Kitt Peak	Spacewatch	·	670 m	MPC · JPL
345749	2007 EN_{15}	—	March 9, 2007	Kitt Peak	Spacewatch	·	850 m	MPC · JPL
345750	2007 EF_{28}	—	March 9, 2007	Catalina	CSS	PHO	1.1 km	MPC · JPL
345751	2007 EL_{39}	—	March 11, 2007	Dax	Dax	·	1.1 km	MPC · JPL
345752	2007 EW_{42}	—	March 9, 2007	Kitt Peak	Spacewatch	NYS	1.2 km	MPC · JPL
345753	2007 EZ_{55}	—	March 12, 2007	Mount Lemmon	Mount Lemmon Survey	L5	9.1 km	MPC · JPL
345754	2007 EC_{62}	—	March 10, 2007	Kitt Peak	Spacewatch	·	750 m	MPC · JPL
345755	2007 EU_{64}	—	March 10, 2007	Kitt Peak	Spacewatch	·	710 m	MPC · JPL
345756	2007 ER_{69}	—	March 10, 2007	Kitt Peak	Spacewatch	·	1.1 km	MPC · JPL
345757	2007 EV_{69}	—	March 10, 2007	Kitt Peak	Spacewatch	·	830 m	MPC · JPL
345758	2007 EY_{75}	—	March 10, 2007	Kitt Peak	Spacewatch	·	1.0 km	MPC · JPL
345759	2007 EK_{81}	—	March 11, 2007	Kitt Peak	Spacewatch	·	1.3 km	MPC · JPL
345760	2007 EB_{82}	—	March 11, 2007	Anderson Mesa	LONEOS	V	940 m	MPC · JPL
345761	2007 EH_{87}	—	March 13, 2007	Mount Lemmon	Mount Lemmon Survey	PHO	1.5 km	MPC · JPL
345762 Jacquescœur	2007 EA_{88}	Jacquescœur	March 13, 2007	Saint-Sulpice	B. Christophe	·	910 m	MPC · JPL
345763 Pompiere	2007 EQ_{88}	Pompiere	March 13, 2007	San Marcello	L. Tesi, M. T. Mazzucato	·	800 m	MPC · JPL
345764	2007 EO_{96}	—	March 10, 2007	Mount Lemmon	Mount Lemmon Survey	·	1.0 km	MPC · JPL
345765	2007 ES_{96}	—	March 10, 2007	Mount Lemmon	Mount Lemmon Survey	·	710 m	MPC · JPL
345766	2007 EH_{105}	—	March 11, 2007	Mount Lemmon	Mount Lemmon Survey	·	640 m	MPC · JPL
345767	2007 EG_{108}	—	March 11, 2007	Kitt Peak	Spacewatch	·	1.6 km	MPC · JPL
345768	2007 EW_{114}	—	March 13, 2007	Mount Lemmon	Mount Lemmon Survey	·	620 m	MPC · JPL
345769	2007 EF_{118}	—	March 13, 2007	Mount Lemmon	Mount Lemmon Survey	·	1.6 km	MPC · JPL
345770	2007 EG_{119}	—	March 13, 2007	Mount Lemmon	Mount Lemmon Survey	MAS	770 m	MPC · JPL
345771	2007 ED_{127}	—	March 9, 2007	Palomar	NEAT	·	1.1 km	MPC · JPL
345772	2007 EP_{130}	—	March 9, 2007	Mount Lemmon	Mount Lemmon Survey	MAS	680 m	MPC · JPL
345773	2007 EE_{132}	—	March 9, 2007	Mount Lemmon	Mount Lemmon Survey	·	900 m	MPC · JPL
345774	2007 EO_{132}	—	March 9, 2007	Mount Lemmon	Mount Lemmon Survey	·	960 m	MPC · JPL
345775	2007 EN_{133}	—	March 9, 2007	Mount Lemmon	Mount Lemmon Survey	L5	9.9 km	MPC · JPL
345776	2007 EN_{138}	—	March 12, 2007	Kitt Peak	Spacewatch	·	680 m	MPC · JPL
345777	2007 EB_{140}	—	March 12, 2007	Mount Lemmon	Mount Lemmon Survey	·	900 m	MPC · JPL
345778	2007 EZ_{156}	—	March 12, 2007	Kitt Peak	Spacewatch	·	910 m	MPC · JPL
345779	2007 EJ_{166}	—	March 10, 2007	Kitt Peak	Spacewatch	·	1.4 km	MPC · JPL
345780	2007 EW_{169}	—	March 14, 2007	Kitt Peak	Spacewatch	(2076)	980 m	MPC · JPL
345781	2007 EZ_{184}	—	March 14, 2007	Mount Lemmon	Mount Lemmon Survey	fast?	1.1 km	MPC · JPL
345782	2007 ES_{192}	—	March 14, 2007	Kitt Peak	Spacewatch	·	1.7 km	MPC · JPL
345783	2007 EW_{195}	—	March 15, 2007	Mount Lemmon	Mount Lemmon Survey	·	1.3 km	MPC · JPL
345784	2007 EH_{197}	—	March 15, 2007	Kitt Peak	Spacewatch	·	1.2 km	MPC · JPL
345785	2007 EN_{200}	—	March 14, 2007	Socorro	LINEAR	·	780 m	MPC · JPL
345786	2007 EP_{223}	—	March 9, 2007	Kitt Peak	Spacewatch	·	620 m	MPC · JPL
345787	2007 FD_{16}	—	October 25, 2005	Kitt Peak	Spacewatch	·	1.1 km	MPC · JPL
345788	2007 FR_{19}	—	March 20, 2007	Mount Lemmon	Mount Lemmon Survey	·	1.2 km	MPC · JPL
345789	2007 FX_{31}	—	March 20, 2007	Kitt Peak	Spacewatch	·	800 m	MPC · JPL
345790	2007 GD	—	April 6, 2007	Marly	P. Kocher	V	740 m	MPC · JPL
345791	2007 GC_{6}	—	April 13, 2007	Altschwendt	W. Ries	·	1.3 km	MPC · JPL
345792	2007 GC_{7}	—	April 7, 2007	Mount Lemmon	Mount Lemmon Survey	·	1.0 km	MPC · JPL
345793	2007 GD_{11}	—	April 11, 2007	Kitt Peak	Spacewatch	·	1.4 km	MPC · JPL
345794	2007 GM_{17}	—	April 11, 2007	Kitt Peak	Spacewatch	NYS	1.2 km	MPC · JPL
345795	2007 GA_{19}	—	April 11, 2007	Kitt Peak	Spacewatch	·	1.0 km	MPC · JPL
345796	2007 GA_{24}	—	April 11, 2007	Kitt Peak	Spacewatch	NYS	760 m	MPC · JPL
345797	2007 GK_{27}	—	April 14, 2007	Kitt Peak	Spacewatch	·	1.1 km	MPC · JPL
345798	2007 GG_{28}	—	April 15, 2007	Catalina	CSS	·	1.4 km	MPC · JPL
345799	2007 GO_{31}	—	April 15, 2007	Kitt Peak	Spacewatch	·	680 m	MPC · JPL
345800	2007 GU_{31}	—	April 15, 2007	Catalina	CSS	V	880 m	MPC · JPL

== 345801–345900 ==
back to top

Designation			Discovery			Properties		Ref
Permanent	Provisional	Named after	Date	Site	Discoverer(s)	Category	Diam.	Ref
345801	2007 GJ_{36}	—	March 15, 2007	Mount Lemmon	Mount Lemmon Survey	·	1.7 km	MPC · JPL
345802	2007 GU_{40}	—	April 14, 2007	Kitt Peak	Spacewatch	·	1.5 km	MPC · JPL
345803	2007 GL_{41}	—	April 14, 2007	Kitt Peak	Spacewatch	·	1.8 km	MPC · JPL
345804	2007 GH_{44}	—	April 14, 2007	Mount Lemmon	Mount Lemmon Survey	·	540 m	MPC · JPL
345805	2007 GE_{48}	—	April 14, 2007	Kitt Peak	Spacewatch	·	1.3 km	MPC · JPL
345806	2007 GB_{50}	—	April 15, 2007	Catalina	CSS	·	1.5 km	MPC · JPL
345807	2007 GO_{52}	—	April 14, 2007	Kitt Peak	Spacewatch	·	1.9 km	MPC · JPL
345808	2007 GY_{59}	—	April 15, 2007	Kitt Peak	Spacewatch	·	1.1 km	MPC · JPL
345809	2007 GO_{60}	—	April 15, 2007	Kitt Peak	Spacewatch	·	1.2 km	MPC · JPL
345810	2007 GW_{61}	—	April 15, 2007	Catalina	CSS	NYS	1.2 km	MPC · JPL
345811	2007 GG_{75}	—	April 11, 2007	Kitt Peak	Spacewatch	·	1.0 km	MPC · JPL
345812	2007 HF_{1}	—	April 16, 2007	Catalina	CSS	PHO	2.3 km	MPC · JPL
345813	2007 HX_{4}	—	April 20, 2007	Catalina	CSS	APO +1km	1.4 km	MPC · JPL
345814	2007 HA_{14}	—	April 19, 2007	Mount Lemmon	Mount Lemmon Survey	·	870 m	MPC · JPL
345815	2007 HA_{17}	—	April 16, 2007	Catalina	CSS	(2076)	830 m	MPC · JPL
345816	2007 HA_{18}	—	April 16, 2007	Catalina	CSS	·	1.2 km	MPC · JPL
345817	2007 HR_{19}	—	April 18, 2007	Kitt Peak	Spacewatch	MAS	850 m	MPC · JPL
345818	2007 HU_{19}	—	April 18, 2007	Kitt Peak	Spacewatch	·	1.5 km	MPC · JPL
345819	2007 HQ_{22}	—	April 18, 2007	Kitt Peak	Spacewatch	·	900 m	MPC · JPL
345820	2007 HL_{26}	—	April 18, 2007	Mount Lemmon	Mount Lemmon Survey	·	1.2 km	MPC · JPL
345821	2007 HC_{27}	—	April 18, 2007	Mount Lemmon	Mount Lemmon Survey	PHO	1.0 km	MPC · JPL
345822	2007 HP_{55}	—	April 22, 2007	Kitt Peak	Spacewatch	V	830 m	MPC · JPL
345823	2007 HV_{70}	—	April 20, 2007	Vail-Jarnac	Jarnac	·	2.7 km	MPC · JPL
345824	2007 HO_{76}	—	April 23, 2007	Kitt Peak	Spacewatch	·	1.3 km	MPC · JPL
345825	2007 HN_{85}	—	April 24, 2007	Kitt Peak	Spacewatch	·	1.5 km	MPC · JPL
345826	2007 HZ_{87}	—	April 27, 2007	Kitt Peak	Spacewatch	(194)	2.1 km	MPC · JPL
345827	2007 HR_{92}	—	April 21, 2007	Cerro Tololo	M. W. Buie	NYS	710 m	MPC · JPL
345828	2007 JK_{3}	—	May 6, 2007	Kitt Peak	Spacewatch	NYS	1.6 km	MPC · JPL
345829	2007 JM_{10}	—	May 7, 2007	Kitt Peak	Spacewatch	·	1.4 km	MPC · JPL
345830	2007 JX_{13}	—	May 9, 2007	Mount Lemmon	Mount Lemmon Survey	·	2.1 km	MPC · JPL
345831	2007 JD_{19}	—	April 23, 2007	Mount Lemmon	Mount Lemmon Survey	MAR	1.2 km	MPC · JPL
345832	2007 JE_{34}	—	May 9, 2007	Catalina	CSS	·	1.8 km	MPC · JPL
345833	2007 KE_{3}	—	May 22, 2007	Mount Lemmon	Mount Lemmon Survey	·	720 m	MPC · JPL
345834	2007 KK_{3}	—	May 22, 2007	Tiki	S. F. Hönig, Teamo, N.	·	1 km	MPC · JPL
345835	2007 KB_{7}	—	May 24, 2007	Reedy Creek	J. Broughton	RAF	1.5 km	MPC · JPL
345836	2007 LO_{1}	—	June 7, 2007	Kitt Peak	Spacewatch	·	1.2 km	MPC · JPL
345837	2007 LZ_{5}	—	June 8, 2007	Kitt Peak	Spacewatch	·	1.2 km	MPC · JPL
345838	2007 LL_{18}	—	June 13, 2007	Tiki	S. F. Hönig, Teamo, N.	·	2.4 km	MPC · JPL
345839	2007 LW_{18}	—	May 16, 2007	Kitt Peak	Spacewatch	JUN	1.1 km	MPC · JPL
345840	2007 LZ_{21}	—	June 12, 2007	Kitt Peak	Spacewatch	·	1.6 km	MPC · JPL
345841	2007 LD_{25}	—	June 14, 2007	Kitt Peak	Spacewatch	·	1.9 km	MPC · JPL
345842 Alexparker	2007 LG_{31}	Alexparker	June 12, 2007	Mauna Kea	D. D. Balam	·	1.7 km	MPC · JPL
345843	2007 ML	—	June 16, 2007	Kitt Peak	Spacewatch	V	870 m	MPC · JPL
345844	2007 MD_{3}	—	June 16, 2007	Kitt Peak	Spacewatch	·	2.6 km	MPC · JPL
345845	2007 MJ_{27}	—	June 17, 2007	Kitt Peak	Spacewatch	·	1.7 km	MPC · JPL
345846	2007 NU_{1}	—	July 12, 2007	La Sagra	OAM	ADE	2.1 km	MPC · JPL
345847	2007 OW_{1}	—	July 19, 2007	Tiki	S. F. Hönig, Teamo, N.	·	2.0 km	MPC · JPL
345848	2007 OX_{2}	—	July 18, 2007	Andrushivka	Andrushivka	·	2.2 km	MPC · JPL
345849	2007 OW_{3}	—	July 18, 2007	Eskridge	G. Hug	·	1.6 km	MPC · JPL
345850	2007 OS_{7}	—	June 22, 2007	Kitt Peak	Spacewatch	·	1.7 km	MPC · JPL
345851	2007 PY_{3}	—	August 8, 2007	Siding Spring	SSS	EUN	1.8 km	MPC · JPL
345852	2007 PT_{6}	—	August 9, 2007	Tiki	S. F. Hönig, Teamo, N.	·	2.0 km	MPC · JPL
345853	2007 PU_{11}	—	August 13, 2007	Socorro	LINEAR	AMO +1km	1.9 km	MPC · JPL
345854	2007 PK_{14}	—	August 8, 2007	Socorro	LINEAR	·	2.1 km	MPC · JPL
345855	2007 PP_{14}	—	August 8, 2007	Socorro	LINEAR	·	2.0 km	MPC · JPL
345856	2007 PA_{21}	—	August 9, 2007	Socorro	LINEAR	·	4.0 km	MPC · JPL
345857	2007 PJ_{26}	—	August 8, 2007	Socorro	LINEAR	·	1.9 km	MPC · JPL
345858	2007 PE_{28}	—	August 14, 2007	Bisei SG Center	BATTeRS	·	2.7 km	MPC · JPL
345859	2007 PB_{32}	—	August 8, 2007	Socorro	LINEAR	·	1.8 km	MPC · JPL
345860	2007 PQ_{40}	—	August 9, 2007	Socorro	LINEAR	MAR	1.3 km	MPC · JPL
345861	2007 PS_{46}	—	August 10, 2007	Kitt Peak	Spacewatch	·	1.5 km	MPC · JPL
345862	2007 PU_{46}	—	August 10, 2007	Kitt Peak	Spacewatch	·	1.5 km	MPC · JPL
345863	2007 PG_{47}	—	August 10, 2007	Kitt Peak	Spacewatch	EOS	2.2 km	MPC · JPL
345864	2007 PF_{49}	—	August 9, 2007	Socorro	LINEAR	·	3.6 km	MPC · JPL
345865	2007 QF	—	August 16, 2007	Bisei SG Center	BATTeRS	EUN	1.9 km	MPC · JPL
345866	2007 QP	—	May 24, 2007	Catalina	CSS	·	3.1 km	MPC · JPL
345867	2007 QB_{1}	—	August 18, 2007	Mayhill	Lowe, A.	JUN	1.3 km	MPC · JPL
345868 Halicarnassus	2007 QE_{2}	Halicarnassus	August 19, 2007	Vallemare Borbona	V. S. Casulli	·	2.2 km	MPC · JPL
345869	2007 QM_{6}	—	August 21, 2007	Anderson Mesa	LONEOS	·	2.0 km	MPC · JPL
345870	2007 QO_{6}	—	August 21, 2007	Anderson Mesa	LONEOS	·	2.0 km	MPC · JPL
345871 Xuguangxian	2007 QR_{6}	Xuguangxian	August 13, 2007	XuYi	PMO NEO Survey Program	·	2.0 km	MPC · JPL
345872	2007 QS_{9}	—	August 22, 2007	Socorro	LINEAR	·	3.8 km	MPC · JPL
345873	2007 QM_{11}	—	August 23, 2007	Kitt Peak	Spacewatch	·	1.5 km	MPC · JPL
345874	2007 QD_{13}	—	August 24, 2007	Kitt Peak	Spacewatch	·	1.9 km	MPC · JPL
345875	2007 QQ_{16}	—	August 21, 2007	Anderson Mesa	LONEOS	·	3.2 km	MPC · JPL
345876	2007 RQ_{6}	—	September 4, 2007	La Sagra	OAM	·	1.6 km	MPC · JPL
345877	2007 RB_{8}	—	September 5, 2007	Bergisch Gladbach	W. Bickel	AGN	1.4 km	MPC · JPL
345878	2007 RN_{10}	—	September 3, 2007	Catalina	CSS	·	2.4 km	MPC · JPL
345879	2007 RW_{12}	—	September 11, 2007	Vicques	M. Ory	·	1.5 km	MPC · JPL
345880	2007 RQ_{27}	—	September 4, 2007	Mount Lemmon	Mount Lemmon Survey	EOS	1.9 km	MPC · JPL
345881	2007 RT_{30}	—	September 5, 2007	Catalina	CSS	·	2.6 km	MPC · JPL
345882	2007 RQ_{43}	—	September 9, 2007	Kitt Peak	Spacewatch	NEM	2.2 km	MPC · JPL
345883	2007 RB_{46}	—	September 9, 2007	Kitt Peak	Spacewatch	·	1.6 km	MPC · JPL
345884	2007 RD_{46}	—	September 9, 2007	Kitt Peak	Spacewatch	·	2.1 km	MPC · JPL
345885	2007 RO_{50}	—	September 9, 2007	Kitt Peak	Spacewatch	·	1.8 km	MPC · JPL
345886	2007 RN_{60}	—	September 10, 2007	Catalina	CSS	·	2.0 km	MPC · JPL
345887	2007 RD_{65}	—	September 10, 2007	Mount Lemmon	Mount Lemmon Survey	·	1.8 km	MPC · JPL
345888	2007 RK_{71}	—	September 10, 2007	Kitt Peak	Spacewatch	·	2.3 km	MPC · JPL
345889	2007 RQ_{71}	—	September 10, 2007	Kitt Peak	Spacewatch	·	1.7 km	MPC · JPL
345890	2007 RE_{73}	—	August 10, 2007	Kitt Peak	Spacewatch	·	1.9 km	MPC · JPL
345891	2007 RO_{78}	—	September 10, 2007	Mount Lemmon	Mount Lemmon Survey	·	1.7 km	MPC · JPL
345892	2007 RR_{78}	—	September 10, 2007	Mount Lemmon	Mount Lemmon Survey	·	1.6 km	MPC · JPL
345893	2007 RA_{84}	—	September 10, 2007	Kitt Peak	Spacewatch	·	2.3 km	MPC · JPL
345894	2007 RU_{90}	—	September 10, 2007	Mount Lemmon	Mount Lemmon Survey	·	1.9 km	MPC · JPL
345895	2007 RC_{93}	—	September 10, 2007	Mount Lemmon	Mount Lemmon Survey	·	1.8 km	MPC · JPL
345896	2007 RE_{96}	—	October 30, 2002	Kitt Peak	Spacewatch	·	1.7 km	MPC · JPL
345897	2007 RM_{96}	—	September 10, 2007	Kitt Peak	Spacewatch	·	1.9 km	MPC · JPL
345898	2007 RB_{98}	—	September 10, 2007	Kitt Peak	Spacewatch	·	3.7 km	MPC · JPL
345899	2007 RS_{99}	—	September 11, 2007	Catalina	CSS	JUN	1.2 km	MPC · JPL
345900	2007 RM_{100}	—	September 11, 2007	Mount Lemmon	Mount Lemmon Survey	EOS	2.3 km	MPC · JPL

== 345901–346000 ==
back to top

Designation			Discovery			Properties		Ref
Permanent	Provisional	Named after	Date	Site	Discoverer(s)	Category	Diam.	Ref
345901	2007 RB_{108}	—	September 11, 2007	Kitt Peak	Spacewatch	·	2.2 km	MPC · JPL
345902	2007 RO_{114}	—	September 11, 2007	Kitt Peak	Spacewatch	·	1.7 km	MPC · JPL
345903	2007 RD_{119}	—	September 11, 2007	Purple Mountain	PMO NEO Survey Program	·	3.1 km	MPC · JPL
345904	2007 RK_{126}	—	September 12, 2007	Mount Lemmon	Mount Lemmon Survey	PAD	1.9 km	MPC · JPL
345905	2007 RU_{129}	—	September 12, 2007	Mount Lemmon	Mount Lemmon Survey	(11882)	2.0 km	MPC · JPL
345906	2007 RS_{140}	—	September 13, 2007	Socorro	LINEAR	·	2.4 km	MPC · JPL
345907	2007 RY_{148}	—	September 12, 2007	Catalina	CSS	·	3.2 km	MPC · JPL
345908	2007 RZ_{148}	—	September 12, 2007	Goodricke-Pigott	R. A. Tucker	·	2.4 km	MPC · JPL
345909	2007 RS_{151}	—	September 27, 2003	Kitt Peak	Spacewatch	·	1.4 km	MPC · JPL
345910	2007 RY_{153}	—	September 10, 2007	Kitt Peak	Spacewatch	AGN	1.0 km	MPC · JPL
345911	2007 RF_{154}	—	September 10, 2007	Kitt Peak	Spacewatch	·	1.5 km	MPC · JPL
345912	2007 RE_{163}	—	September 10, 2007	Kitt Peak	Spacewatch	NEM	2.3 km	MPC · JPL
345913	2007 RQ_{167}	—	September 10, 2007	Kitt Peak	Spacewatch	·	2.3 km	MPC · JPL
345914	2007 RT_{167}	—	September 10, 2007	Kitt Peak	Spacewatch	AST	1.6 km	MPC · JPL
345915	2007 RR_{170}	—	September 10, 2007	Kitt Peak	Spacewatch	NEM	2.2 km	MPC · JPL
345916	2007 RS_{172}	—	September 10, 2007	Kitt Peak	Spacewatch	·	2.3 km	MPC · JPL
345917	2007 RB_{173}	—	September 10, 2007	Kitt Peak	Spacewatch	·	2.3 km	MPC · JPL
345918	2007 RU_{174}	—	September 10, 2007	Kitt Peak	Spacewatch	·	1.6 km	MPC · JPL
345919	2007 RX_{180}	—	September 11, 2007	Mount Lemmon	Mount Lemmon Survey	·	1.4 km	MPC · JPL
345920	2007 RH_{184}	—	September 9, 2007	Kitt Peak	Spacewatch	·	2.1 km	MPC · JPL
345921	2007 RF_{194}	—	September 12, 2007	Kitt Peak	Spacewatch	KOR	1.3 km	MPC · JPL
345922	2007 RM_{205}	—	September 9, 2007	Kitt Peak	Spacewatch	·	2.9 km	MPC · JPL
345923	2007 RJ_{210}	—	September 10, 2007	Kitt Peak	Spacewatch	·	1.9 km	MPC · JPL
345924	2007 RZ_{214}	—	September 12, 2007	Kitt Peak	Spacewatch	AGN	1.3 km	MPC · JPL
345925	2007 RA_{215}	—	September 12, 2007	Kitt Peak	Spacewatch	MRX	1.2 km	MPC · JPL
345926	2007 RO_{223}	—	September 8, 2007	Mount Lemmon	Mount Lemmon Survey	·	4.1 km	MPC · JPL
345927	2007 RC_{233}	—	September 12, 2007	Catalina	CSS	(13314)	2.4 km	MPC · JPL
345928	2007 RK_{233}	—	September 12, 2007	Catalina	CSS	·	2.3 km	MPC · JPL
345929	2007 RW_{233}	—	September 12, 2007	Anderson Mesa	LONEOS	·	2.8 km	MPC · JPL
345930	2007 RN_{240}	—	August 21, 2007	La Sagra	OAM	·	2.5 km	MPC · JPL
345931	2007 RH_{246}	—	September 12, 2007	Mount Lemmon	Mount Lemmon Survey	·	1.8 km	MPC · JPL
345932	2007 RR_{246}	—	September 12, 2007	Catalina	CSS	DOR	2.6 km	MPC · JPL
345933	2007 RP_{251}	—	September 9, 2007	Kitt Peak	Spacewatch	·	2.0 km	MPC · JPL
345934	2007 RO_{252}	—	September 13, 2007	Kitt Peak	Spacewatch	THM	2.6 km	MPC · JPL
345935	2007 RP_{255}	—	September 14, 2007	Kitt Peak	Spacewatch	·	2.5 km	MPC · JPL
345936	2007 RB_{268}	—	September 15, 2007	Kitt Peak	Spacewatch	AGN	1.3 km	MPC · JPL
345937	2007 RU_{273}	—	September 15, 2007	Kitt Peak	Spacewatch	·	1.9 km	MPC · JPL
345938	2007 RX_{276}	—	September 5, 2007	Catalina	CSS	·	2.7 km	MPC · JPL
345939	2007 RJ_{277}	—	September 5, 2007	Catalina	CSS	·	2.9 km	MPC · JPL
345940	2007 RB_{278}	—	September 5, 2007	Catalina	CSS	·	2.6 km	MPC · JPL
345941	2007 RC_{284}	—	September 9, 2007	Kitt Peak	Spacewatch	·	3.2 km	MPC · JPL
345942	2007 RU_{287}	—	September 10, 2007	Kitt Peak	Spacewatch	·	4.2 km	MPC · JPL
345943	2007 RY_{287}	—	September 10, 2007	Kitt Peak	Spacewatch	·	3.3 km	MPC · JPL
345944	2007 RZ_{293}	—	September 13, 2007	Mount Lemmon	Mount Lemmon Survey	·	1.7 km	MPC · JPL
345945	2007 RD_{303}	—	September 15, 2007	Mount Lemmon	Mount Lemmon Survey	KOR	1.5 km	MPC · JPL
345946	2007 RT_{314}	—	September 3, 2007	Catalina	CSS	·	3.8 km	MPC · JPL
345947	2007 RL_{315}	—	September 10, 2007	Kitt Peak	Spacewatch	AGN	1.4 km	MPC · JPL
345948	2007 RA_{319}	—	September 12, 2007	Catalina	CSS	·	1.8 km	MPC · JPL
345949	2007 RL_{320}	—	September 13, 2007	Mount Lemmon	Mount Lemmon Survey	·	4.0 km	MPC · JPL
345950	2007 RA_{321}	—	September 13, 2007	Socorro	LINEAR	·	3.5 km	MPC · JPL
345951	2007 RT_{325}	—	September 15, 2007	Mount Lemmon	Mount Lemmon Survey	·	2.4 km	MPC · JPL
345952	2007 SP_{2}	—	September 20, 2007	Farra d'Isonzo	Farra d'Isonzo	·	1.5 km	MPC · JPL
345953	2007 SL_{4}	—	September 19, 2007	Siding Spring	SSS	TIN	1.5 km	MPC · JPL
345954	2007 SX_{7}	—	September 18, 2007	Kitt Peak	Spacewatch	·	1.7 km	MPC · JPL
345955	2007 SQ_{15}	—	August 14, 2007	Siding Spring	SSS	·	2.3 km	MPC · JPL
345956	2007 SS_{16}	—	September 30, 2007	Kitt Peak	Spacewatch	AEO	1.4 km	MPC · JPL
345957	2007 SL_{18}	—	September 25, 2007	Mount Lemmon	Mount Lemmon Survey	·	2.3 km	MPC · JPL
345958	2007 SS_{19}	—	September 25, 2007	Mount Lemmon	Mount Lemmon Survey	AGN	1.4 km	MPC · JPL
345959 Dafeng	2007 SA_{23}	Dafeng	September 21, 2007	XuYi	PMO NEO Survey Program	DOR	2.5 km	MPC · JPL
345960	2007 TO_{3}	—	October 5, 2007	Pla D'Arguines	R. Ferrando	·	2.2 km	MPC · JPL
345961	2007 TX_{4}	—	October 2, 2007	Charleston	Astronomical Research Observatory	AGN	1.2 km	MPC · JPL
345962	2007 TM_{24}	—	October 11, 2007	Eskridge	G. Hug	·	2.2 km	MPC · JPL
345963	2007 TR_{32}	—	October 6, 2007	Kitt Peak	Spacewatch	·	1.7 km	MPC · JPL
345964	2007 TX_{42}	—	March 4, 2005	Mount Lemmon	Mount Lemmon Survey	·	2.7 km	MPC · JPL
345965	2007 TS_{49}	—	March 9, 2005	Mount Lemmon	Mount Lemmon Survey	AGN	1.1 km	MPC · JPL
345966	2007 TW_{53}	—	October 4, 2007	Kitt Peak	Spacewatch	HYG	3.3 km	MPC · JPL
345967	2007 TA_{90}	—	October 8, 2007	Mount Lemmon	Mount Lemmon Survey	(16286)	2.6 km	MPC · JPL
345968	2007 TO_{93}	—	October 6, 2007	Kitt Peak	Spacewatch	·	1.9 km	MPC · JPL
345969	2007 TC_{102}	—	September 12, 2007	Mount Lemmon	Mount Lemmon Survey	·	2.3 km	MPC · JPL
345970	2007 TU_{103}	—	October 8, 2007	Mount Lemmon	Mount Lemmon Survey	·	2.5 km	MPC · JPL
345971 Marktorrence	2007 TG_{105}	Marktorrence	October 14, 2007	Front Royal	Skillman, D. R.	HOF	2.7 km	MPC · JPL
345972 Rufin	2007 TM_{105}	Rufin	October 14, 2007	Saint-Sulpice	B. Christophe	AST	1.6 km	MPC · JPL
345973	2007 TN_{105}	—	October 15, 2007	Calvin-Rehoboth	Calvin College	·	2.1 km	MPC · JPL
345974	2007 TL_{110}	—	October 8, 2007	Catalina	CSS	·	2.6 km	MPC · JPL
345975	2007 TF_{115}	—	October 8, 2007	Anderson Mesa	LONEOS	·	2.1 km	MPC · JPL
345976	2007 TZ_{117}	—	October 9, 2007	Kitt Peak	Spacewatch	EOS	2.2 km	MPC · JPL
345977	2007 TW_{119}	—	October 9, 2007	Mount Lemmon	Mount Lemmon Survey	EOS	1.7 km	MPC · JPL
345978	2007 TS_{121}	—	October 6, 2007	Kitt Peak	Spacewatch	·	1.5 km	MPC · JPL
345979	2007 TQ_{135}	—	October 8, 2007	Kitt Peak	Spacewatch	·	1.9 km	MPC · JPL
345980	2007 TE_{137}	—	October 8, 2007	Kitt Peak	Spacewatch	·	2.6 km	MPC · JPL
345981	2007 TZ_{138}	—	October 9, 2007	Kitt Peak	Spacewatch	AGN	1.2 km	MPC · JPL
345982	2007 TL_{141}	—	October 9, 2007	Mount Lemmon	Mount Lemmon Survey	·	3.5 km	MPC · JPL
345983	2007 TX_{145}	—	October 6, 2007	Socorro	LINEAR	·	2.5 km	MPC · JPL
345984	2007 TJ_{149}	—	October 8, 2007	Socorro	LINEAR	·	2.1 km	MPC · JPL
345985	2007 TM_{152}	—	September 24, 2007	Kitt Peak	Spacewatch	EOS	2.2 km	MPC · JPL
345986	2007 TK_{154}	—	September 3, 2002	Palomar	NEAT	·	2.4 km	MPC · JPL
345987	2007 TT_{166}	—	October 12, 2007	Socorro	LINEAR	·	2.4 km	MPC · JPL
345988	2007 TW_{166}	—	October 12, 2007	Socorro	LINEAR	·	2.2 km	MPC · JPL
345989	2007 TP_{169}	—	October 12, 2007	Socorro	LINEAR	·	5.2 km	MPC · JPL
345990	2007 TS_{172}	—	October 15, 2007	Socorro	LINEAR	H	410 m	MPC · JPL
345991	2007 TF_{173}	—	October 4, 2007	Kitt Peak	Spacewatch	·	2.9 km	MPC · JPL
345992	2007 TG_{174}	—	October 4, 2007	Kitt Peak	Spacewatch	·	2.4 km	MPC · JPL
345993	2007 TO_{176}	—	October 5, 2007	Purple Mountain	PMO NEO Survey Program	·	3.9 km	MPC · JPL
345994	2007 TL_{182}	—	October 8, 2007	Anderson Mesa	LONEOS	·	3.2 km	MPC · JPL
345995	2007 TN_{182}	—	October 8, 2007	Anderson Mesa	LONEOS	·	2.5 km	MPC · JPL
345996	2007 TV_{184}	—	October 13, 2007	Gaisberg	Gierlinger, R.	KOR	1.4 km	MPC · JPL
345997	2007 TO_{194}	—	October 7, 2007	Mount Lemmon	Mount Lemmon Survey	KOR	1.2 km	MPC · JPL
345998	2007 TN_{196}	—	October 7, 2007	Mount Lemmon	Mount Lemmon Survey	HYG	2.9 km	MPC · JPL
345999	2007 TX_{199}	—	October 8, 2007	Kitt Peak	Spacewatch	·	1.7 km	MPC · JPL
346000	2007 TD_{202}	—	October 8, 2007	Mount Lemmon	Mount Lemmon Survey	·	2.7 km	MPC · JPL

back to top

== See also ==
- Meanings of minor-planet names: 345001–346000
