= List of minor planets: 346001–347000 =

The following is a partial list of minor planets, running from minor-planet number 346001 through 347000, inclusive. The primary data for this and other partial lists is based on JPL's "Small-Body Orbital Elements" and data available from the Minor Planet Center. Critical list information is also provided by the MPC, unless otherwise specified from Lowell Observatory. A detailed description of the table's columns and additional sources are given on the main page including a complete list of every page in this series, and a statistical break-up on the dynamical classification of minor planets.

Also see the summary list of all named bodies in numerical and alphabetical order, and the corresponding naming citations for the number range of this particular list. New namings may only be added to this list after official publication, as the preannouncement of names is condemned by the Working Group for Small Bodies Nomenclature of the International Astronomical Union.

| Near-Earth obj. | MBA (inner) | MBA (outer) | Centaur |
| Mars-crosser | MBA (middle) | Jupiter trojan | Trans-Neptunian obj. |
| Unclassified |

== 346001–346100 ==
| Designation | | | Discovery | | | Properties | | Ref |
| Permanent | Provisional | Named after | Date | Site | Discoverer(s) | Category | Diam. | Ref |
|---|---|---|---|---|---|---|---|---|
| 346001 | 2007 TG_{202} | — | October 8, 2007 | Mount Lemmon | Mount Lemmon Survey | · | 1.9 km | MPC · JPL |
| 346002 | 2007 TL_{204} | — | October 8, 2007 | Mount Lemmon | Mount Lemmon Survey | KOR | 1.4 km | MPC · JPL |
| 346003 | 2007 TA_{207} | — | October 10, 2007 | Mount Lemmon | Mount Lemmon Survey | AGN | 1.1 km | MPC · JPL |
| 346004 | 2007 TD_{207} | — | October 10, 2007 | Mount Lemmon | Mount Lemmon Survey | · | 1.6 km | MPC · JPL |
| 346005 | 2007 TQ_{216} | — | October 7, 2007 | Kitt Peak | Spacewatch | · | 2.0 km | MPC · JPL |
| 346006 | 2007 TG_{217} | — | October 7, 2007 | Kitt Peak | Spacewatch | · | 2.4 km | MPC · JPL |
| 346007 | 2007 TU_{221} | — | October 9, 2007 | Kitt Peak | Spacewatch | AGN | 1.2 km | MPC · JPL |
| 346008 | 2007 TB_{223} | — | October 10, 2007 | Kitt Peak | Spacewatch | · | 2.7 km | MPC · JPL |
| 346009 | 2007 TT_{239} | — | October 10, 2007 | Mount Lemmon | Mount Lemmon Survey | · | 4.7 km | MPC · JPL |
| 346010 | 2007 TS_{243} | — | October 8, 2007 | Catalina | CSS | · | 2.2 km | MPC · JPL |
| 346011 | 2007 TU_{248} | — | October 11, 2007 | Catalina | CSS | · | 2.3 km | MPC · JPL |
| 346012 | 2007 TY_{255} | — | October 10, 2007 | Kitt Peak | Spacewatch | · | 2.4 km | MPC · JPL |
| 346013 | 2007 TD_{266} | — | October 11, 2007 | Kitt Peak | Spacewatch | · | 1.7 km | MPC · JPL |
| 346014 | 2007 TG_{266} | — | October 12, 2007 | Kitt Peak | Spacewatch | · | 1.7 km | MPC · JPL |
| 346015 | 2007 TQ_{266} | — | October 9, 2007 | Kitt Peak | Spacewatch | · | 3.2 km | MPC · JPL |
| 346016 | 2007 TF_{283} | — | October 8, 2007 | Mount Lemmon | Mount Lemmon Survey | PAD | 2.1 km | MPC · JPL |
| 346017 | 2007 TW_{286} | — | October 10, 2007 | Mount Lemmon | Mount Lemmon Survey | · | 4.0 km | MPC · JPL |
| 346018 | 2007 TN_{289} | — | October 12, 2007 | Mount Lemmon | Mount Lemmon Survey | · | 1.5 km | MPC · JPL |
| 346019 | 2007 TX_{292} | — | October 8, 2007 | Mount Lemmon | Mount Lemmon Survey | · | 2.9 km | MPC · JPL |
| 346020 | 2007 TD_{298} | — | October 11, 2007 | Mount Lemmon | Mount Lemmon Survey | · | 2.1 km | MPC · JPL |
| 346021 | 2007 TZ_{316} | — | October 12, 2007 | Kitt Peak | Spacewatch | KOR | 1.4 km | MPC · JPL |
| 346022 | 2007 TJ_{327} | — | October 11, 2007 | Kitt Peak | Spacewatch | · | 2.2 km | MPC · JPL |
| 346023 | 2007 TD_{335} | — | October 11, 2007 | Kitt Peak | Spacewatch | · | 3.0 km | MPC · JPL |
| 346024 | 2007 TA_{339} | — | October 15, 2007 | Kitt Peak | Spacewatch | KOR | 1.4 km | MPC · JPL |
| 346025 | 2007 TG_{339} | — | October 8, 2007 | Mount Lemmon | Mount Lemmon Survey | · | 1.4 km | MPC · JPL |
| 346026 | 2007 TM_{355} | — | October 11, 2007 | Catalina | CSS | THB | 3.8 km | MPC · JPL |
| 346027 | 2007 TT_{360} | — | October 14, 2007 | Mount Lemmon | Mount Lemmon Survey | · | 2.2 km | MPC · JPL |
| 346028 | 2007 TS_{363} | — | October 14, 2007 | Mount Lemmon | Mount Lemmon Survey | · | 3.9 km | MPC · JPL |
| 346029 | 2007 TA_{365} | — | October 9, 2007 | Mount Lemmon | Mount Lemmon Survey | · | 3.6 km | MPC · JPL |
| 346030 | 2007 TV_{371} | — | October 13, 2007 | Catalina | CSS | · | 3.0 km | MPC · JPL |
| 346031 | 2007 TG_{383} | — | October 14, 2007 | Kitt Peak | Spacewatch | KOR | 1.5 km | MPC · JPL |
| 346032 | 2007 TW_{383} | — | October 14, 2007 | Kitt Peak | Spacewatch | · | 1.8 km | MPC · JPL |
| 346033 | 2007 TS_{392} | — | October 15, 2007 | Catalina | CSS | · | 1.8 km | MPC · JPL |
| 346034 | 2007 TT_{403} | — | October 15, 2007 | Kitt Peak | Spacewatch | · | 2.1 km | MPC · JPL |
| 346035 | 2007 TE_{405} | — | October 15, 2007 | Kitt Peak | Spacewatch | · | 2.4 km | MPC · JPL |
| 346036 | 2007 TW_{412} | — | October 15, 2007 | Anderson Mesa | LONEOS | · | 2.3 km | MPC · JPL |
| 346037 | 2007 TS_{419} | — | October 3, 2007 | Siding Spring | SSS | · | 2.8 km | MPC · JPL |
| 346038 | 2007 TX_{419} | — | September 13, 2007 | Catalina | CSS | · | 4.0 km | MPC · JPL |
| 346039 | 2007 TS_{422} | — | October 10, 2007 | Mount Lemmon | Mount Lemmon Survey | · | 2.1 km | MPC · JPL |
| 346040 | 2007 TD_{423} | — | October 4, 2007 | Kitt Peak | Spacewatch | KOR | 1.2 km | MPC · JPL |
| 346041 | 2007 TN_{425} | — | October 8, 2007 | Anderson Mesa | LONEOS | · | 3.7 km | MPC · JPL |
| 346042 | 2007 TU_{429} | — | October 13, 2007 | Kitt Peak | Spacewatch | KOR | 1.4 km | MPC · JPL |
| 346043 | 2007 TO_{440} | — | May 4, 2005 | Mount Lemmon | Mount Lemmon Survey | EOS | 2.4 km | MPC · JPL |
| 346044 | 2007 TE_{451} | — | October 14, 2007 | Mount Lemmon | Mount Lemmon Survey | · | 2.7 km | MPC · JPL |
| 346045 | 2007 UW_{5} | — | October 19, 2007 | La Cañada | Lacruz, J. | · | 2.3 km | MPC · JPL |
| 346046 | 2007 UX_{17} | — | October 16, 2007 | Mount Lemmon | Mount Lemmon Survey | · | 2.1 km | MPC · JPL |
| 346047 | 2007 UJ_{20} | — | October 18, 2007 | Mount Lemmon | Mount Lemmon Survey | KOR | 1.2 km | MPC · JPL |
| 346048 | 2007 UQ_{22} | — | October 16, 2007 | Kitt Peak | Spacewatch | · | 3.6 km | MPC · JPL |
| 346049 | 2007 UX_{22} | — | October 16, 2007 | Kitt Peak | Spacewatch | KOR | 1.3 km | MPC · JPL |
| 346050 | 2007 UE_{24} | — | October 16, 2007 | Kitt Peak | Spacewatch | · | 1.7 km | MPC · JPL |
| 346051 | 2007 UK_{26} | — | October 19, 2007 | Kitt Peak | Spacewatch | · | 2.5 km | MPC · JPL |
| 346052 | 2007 UZ_{29} | — | October 19, 2007 | Anderson Mesa | LONEOS | · | 1.8 km | MPC · JPL |
| 346053 | 2007 UP_{34} | — | October 18, 2007 | Anderson Mesa | LONEOS | · | 1.8 km | MPC · JPL |
| 346054 | 2007 UL_{36} | — | October 19, 2007 | Catalina | CSS | NEM | 2.9 km | MPC · JPL |
| 346055 | 2007 UU_{40} | — | October 16, 2007 | Kitt Peak | Spacewatch | · | 2.6 km | MPC · JPL |
| 346056 | 2007 UO_{43} | — | October 18, 2007 | Kitt Peak | Spacewatch | · | 1.5 km | MPC · JPL |
| 346057 | 2007 UO_{48} | — | October 20, 2007 | Mount Lemmon | Mount Lemmon Survey | · | 2.5 km | MPC · JPL |
| 346058 | 2007 UD_{50} | — | October 24, 2007 | Mount Lemmon | Mount Lemmon Survey | · | 2.6 km | MPC · JPL |
| 346059 | 2007 UL_{55} | — | October 30, 2007 | Kitt Peak | Spacewatch | NAE | 3.4 km | MPC · JPL |
| 346060 | 2007 UU_{55} | — | October 30, 2007 | Kitt Peak | Spacewatch | · | 1.8 km | MPC · JPL |
| 346061 | 2007 UM_{61} | — | October 18, 2007 | Kitt Peak | Spacewatch | · | 2.2 km | MPC · JPL |
| 346062 | 2007 UH_{63} | — | October 30, 2007 | Mount Lemmon | Mount Lemmon Survey | · | 1.5 km | MPC · JPL |
| 346063 | 2007 UG_{68} | — | October 30, 2007 | Catalina | CSS | · | 2.6 km | MPC · JPL |
| 346064 | 2007 UH_{82} | — | October 30, 2007 | Kitt Peak | Spacewatch | KOR | 1.4 km | MPC · JPL |
| 346065 | 2007 UR_{83} | — | October 30, 2007 | Kitt Peak | Spacewatch | EOS | 1.9 km | MPC · JPL |
| 346066 | 2007 UO_{85} | — | October 30, 2007 | Kitt Peak | Spacewatch | · | 2.1 km | MPC · JPL |
| 346067 | 2007 UG_{86} | — | October 30, 2007 | Kitt Peak | Spacewatch | · | 2.4 km | MPC · JPL |
| 346068 | 2007 UM_{87} | — | October 30, 2007 | Kitt Peak | Spacewatch | KOR | 1.7 km | MPC · JPL |
| 346069 | 2007 UV_{87} | — | October 30, 2007 | Kitt Peak | Spacewatch | · | 1.9 km | MPC · JPL |
| 346070 | 2007 UN_{89} | — | October 30, 2007 | Mount Lemmon | Mount Lemmon Survey | · | 2.0 km | MPC · JPL |
| 346071 | 2007 UZ_{94} | — | April 2, 2005 | Mount Lemmon | Mount Lemmon Survey | · | 2.3 km | MPC · JPL |
| 346072 | 2007 UQ_{96} | — | October 9, 2007 | Mount Lemmon | Mount Lemmon Survey | · | 1.8 km | MPC · JPL |
| 346073 | 2007 UN_{100} | — | October 30, 2007 | Kitt Peak | Spacewatch | · | 2.5 km | MPC · JPL |
| 346074 | 2007 UQ_{102} | — | October 14, 2007 | Kitt Peak | Spacewatch | TIR | 3.9 km | MPC · JPL |
| 346075 | 2007 UL_{104} | — | October 30, 2007 | Kitt Peak | Spacewatch | · | 2.5 km | MPC · JPL |
| 346076 | 2007 UA_{105} | — | October 30, 2007 | Kitt Peak | Spacewatch | · | 2.8 km | MPC · JPL |
| 346077 | 2007 UF_{114} | — | October 31, 2007 | Kitt Peak | Spacewatch | EOS | 2.2 km | MPC · JPL |
| 346078 | 2007 UL_{120} | — | January 15, 2004 | Kitt Peak | Spacewatch | KOR | 1.6 km | MPC · JPL |
| 346079 | 2007 UQ_{128} | — | October 20, 2007 | Kitt Peak | Spacewatch | · | 1.9 km | MPC · JPL |
| 346080 | 2007 UJ_{130} | — | October 18, 2007 | Kitt Peak | Spacewatch | · | 2.0 km | MPC · JPL |
| 346081 | 2007 UL_{130} | — | October 18, 2007 | Kitt Peak | Spacewatch | · | 2.6 km | MPC · JPL |
| 346082 | 2007 UR_{131} | — | May 4, 2005 | Mount Lemmon | Mount Lemmon Survey | · | 2.2 km | MPC · JPL |
| 346083 | 2007 UB_{133} | — | October 21, 2007 | Kitt Peak | Spacewatch | · | 2.0 km | MPC · JPL |
| 346084 | 2007 UN_{138} | — | October 19, 2007 | Mount Lemmon | Mount Lemmon Survey | · | 4.3 km | MPC · JPL |
| 346085 | 2007 UL_{139} | — | June 18, 2006 | Kitt Peak | Spacewatch | · | 2.2 km | MPC · JPL |
| 346086 | 2007 UD_{140} | — | October 16, 2007 | Mount Lemmon | Mount Lemmon Survey | · | 1.8 km | MPC · JPL |
| 346087 | 2007 UP_{141} | — | October 17, 2007 | Mount Lemmon | Mount Lemmon Survey | · | 2.6 km | MPC · JPL |
| 346088 | 2007 UW_{141} | — | October 21, 2007 | Mount Lemmon | Mount Lemmon Survey | · | 3.4 km | MPC · JPL |
| 346089 | 2007 VQ_{7} | — | November 4, 2007 | Junk Bond | D. Healy | · | 1.7 km | MPC · JPL |
| 346090 | 2007 VM_{23} | — | November 2, 2007 | Mount Lemmon | Mount Lemmon Survey | KOR | 1.1 km | MPC · JPL |
| 346091 | 2007 VH_{30} | — | November 2, 2007 | Kitt Peak | Spacewatch | · | 2.0 km | MPC · JPL |
| 346092 | 2007 VK_{30} | — | November 2, 2007 | Kitt Peak | Spacewatch | · | 1.7 km | MPC · JPL |
| 346093 | 2007 VF_{31} | — | November 2, 2007 | Kitt Peak | Spacewatch | · | 2.1 km | MPC · JPL |
| 346094 | 2007 VG_{32} | — | November 2, 2007 | Kitt Peak | Spacewatch | · | 4.1 km | MPC · JPL |
| 346095 | 2007 VU_{35} | — | November 1, 2007 | Kitt Peak | Spacewatch | KOR | 1.3 km | MPC · JPL |
| 346096 | 2007 VW_{44} | — | November 1, 2007 | Kitt Peak | Spacewatch | TIR | 4.6 km | MPC · JPL |
| 346097 | 2007 VY_{45} | — | November 1, 2007 | Kitt Peak | Spacewatch | · | 2.2 km | MPC · JPL |
| 346098 | 2007 VL_{48} | — | November 1, 2007 | Kitt Peak | Spacewatch | · | 3.0 km | MPC · JPL |
| 346099 | 2007 VN_{55} | — | November 1, 2007 | Kitt Peak | Spacewatch | · | 3.3 km | MPC · JPL |
| 346100 | 2007 VN_{59} | — | November 1, 2007 | Kitt Peak | Spacewatch | · | 1.6 km | MPC · JPL |

== 346101–346200 ==
back to top

| Designation | | | Discovery | | | Properties | | Ref |
| Permanent | Provisional | Named after | Date | Site | Discoverer(s) | Category | Diam. | Ref |
|---|---|---|---|---|---|---|---|---|
| 346101 | 2007 VN_{62} | — | November 1, 2007 | Kitt Peak | Spacewatch | · | 4.8 km | MPC · JPL |
| 346102 | 2007 VY_{62} | — | November 1, 2007 | Kitt Peak | Spacewatch | · | 2.7 km | MPC · JPL |
| 346103 | 2007 VW_{63} | — | November 1, 2007 | Kitt Peak | Spacewatch | · | 2.9 km | MPC · JPL |
| 346104 | 2007 VE_{65} | — | November 1, 2007 | Kitt Peak | Spacewatch | · | 1.9 km | MPC · JPL |
| 346105 | 2007 VN_{66} | — | November 2, 2007 | Catalina | CSS | · | 2.6 km | MPC · JPL |
| 346106 | 2007 VV_{79} | — | November 3, 2007 | Kitt Peak | Spacewatch | THM | 2.2 km | MPC · JPL |
| 346107 | 2007 VX_{79} | — | November 3, 2007 | Kitt Peak | Spacewatch | · | 1.8 km | MPC · JPL |
| 346108 | 2007 VG_{85} | — | November 2, 2007 | Socorro | LINEAR | · | 2.3 km | MPC · JPL |
| 346109 | 2007 VC_{88} | — | November 2, 2007 | Socorro | LINEAR | · | 4.2 km | MPC · JPL |
| 346110 | 2007 VA_{92} | — | November 7, 2007 | Eskridge | G. Hug | · | 6.4 km | MPC · JPL |
| 346111 | 2007 VQ_{92} | — | November 3, 2007 | Socorro | LINEAR | · | 3.2 km | MPC · JPL |
| 346112 | 2007 VF_{94} | — | November 7, 2007 | Bisei SG Center | BATTeRS | · | 4.7 km | MPC · JPL |
| 346113 | 2007 VX_{97} | — | November 1, 2007 | Kitt Peak | Spacewatch | · | 2.4 km | MPC · JPL |
| 346114 | 2007 VG_{102} | — | November 2, 2007 | Kitt Peak | Spacewatch | · | 3.6 km | MPC · JPL |
| 346115 | 2007 VG_{103} | — | November 3, 2007 | Kitt Peak | Spacewatch | · | 2.0 km | MPC · JPL |
| 346116 | 2007 VD_{115} | — | November 3, 2007 | Kitt Peak | Spacewatch | HYG | 2.5 km | MPC · JPL |
| 346117 | 2007 VT_{129} | — | November 1, 2007 | Mount Lemmon | Mount Lemmon Survey | KOR | 1.6 km | MPC · JPL |
| 346118 | 2007 VD_{132} | — | November 2, 2007 | Mount Lemmon | Mount Lemmon Survey | · | 1.4 km | MPC · JPL |
| 346119 | 2007 VZ_{134} | — | November 3, 2007 | Kitt Peak | Spacewatch | · | 2.4 km | MPC · JPL |
| 346120 | 2007 VM_{142} | — | November 4, 2007 | Kitt Peak | Spacewatch | KOR | 1.5 km | MPC · JPL |
| 346121 | 2007 VS_{150} | — | November 7, 2007 | Kitt Peak | Spacewatch | · | 3.3 km | MPC · JPL |
| 346122 | 2007 VH_{156} | — | November 5, 2007 | Kitt Peak | Spacewatch | EOS | 1.6 km | MPC · JPL |
| 346123 | 2007 VP_{156} | — | November 5, 2007 | Mount Lemmon | Mount Lemmon Survey | · | 1.9 km | MPC · JPL |
| 346124 | 2007 VV_{165} | — | November 5, 2007 | Kitt Peak | Spacewatch | · | 2.6 km | MPC · JPL |
| 346125 | 2007 VA_{167} | — | November 5, 2007 | Mount Lemmon | Mount Lemmon Survey | · | 5.1 km | MPC · JPL |
| 346126 | 2007 VE_{169} | — | November 5, 2007 | Kitt Peak | Spacewatch | · | 4.0 km | MPC · JPL |
| 346127 | 2007 VM_{169} | — | November 5, 2007 | Kitt Peak | Spacewatch | · | 3.2 km | MPC · JPL |
| 346128 | 2007 VR_{171} | — | November 7, 2007 | Kitt Peak | Spacewatch | · | 2.2 km | MPC · JPL |
| 346129 | 2007 VW_{173} | — | November 2, 2007 | Catalina | CSS | · | 4.3 km | MPC · JPL |
| 346130 | 2007 VG_{174} | — | November 3, 2007 | Anderson Mesa | LONEOS | · | 2.0 km | MPC · JPL |
| 346131 | 2007 VB_{192} | — | November 4, 2007 | Mount Lemmon | Mount Lemmon Survey | · | 4.0 km | MPC · JPL |
| 346132 | 2007 VN_{194} | — | November 5, 2007 | Mount Lemmon | Mount Lemmon Survey | · | 3.8 km | MPC · JPL |
| 346133 | 2007 VM_{196} | — | November 7, 2007 | Catalina | CSS | BRA | 1.8 km | MPC · JPL |
| 346134 | 2007 VV_{197} | — | November 8, 2007 | Mount Lemmon | Mount Lemmon Survey | · | 2.3 km | MPC · JPL |
| 346135 | 2007 VF_{202} | — | November 5, 2007 | Purple Mountain | PMO NEO Survey Program | · | 3.1 km | MPC · JPL |
| 346136 | 2007 VY_{207} | — | October 12, 2007 | Kitt Peak | Spacewatch | KOR | 1.3 km | MPC · JPL |
| 346137 | 2007 VV_{220} | — | November 9, 2007 | Kitt Peak | Spacewatch | · | 2.0 km | MPC · JPL |
| 346138 | 2007 VF_{222} | — | November 7, 2007 | Mount Lemmon | Mount Lemmon Survey | · | 1.7 km | MPC · JPL |
| 346139 | 2007 VX_{224} | — | November 9, 2007 | Mount Lemmon | Mount Lemmon Survey | · | 2.6 km | MPC · JPL |
| 346140 | 2007 VB_{225} | — | November 9, 2007 | Mount Lemmon | Mount Lemmon Survey | · | 1.5 km | MPC · JPL |
| 346141 | 2007 VA_{226} | — | November 9, 2007 | Mount Lemmon | Mount Lemmon Survey | · | 3.3 km | MPC · JPL |
| 346142 | 2007 VZ_{230} | — | November 7, 2007 | Kitt Peak | Spacewatch | KOR | 1.5 km | MPC · JPL |
| 346143 | 2007 VK_{234} | — | November 9, 2007 | Kitt Peak | Spacewatch | · | 3.1 km | MPC · JPL |
| 346144 | 2007 VT_{236} | — | November 11, 2007 | Mount Lemmon | Mount Lemmon Survey | · | 2.2 km | MPC · JPL |
| 346145 | 2007 VQ_{237} | — | November 11, 2007 | Mount Lemmon | Mount Lemmon Survey | slow | 4.1 km | MPC · JPL |
| 346146 | 2007 VK_{238} | — | November 13, 2007 | Kitt Peak | Spacewatch | · | 2.6 km | MPC · JPL |
| 346147 | 2007 VC_{239} | — | April 7, 2005 | Anderson Mesa | LONEOS | HNS | 1.9 km | MPC · JPL |
| 346148 | 2007 VH_{241} | — | November 11, 2007 | Purple Mountain | PMO NEO Survey Program | · | 3.7 km | MPC · JPL |
| 346149 | 2007 VH_{251} | — | November 9, 2007 | Catalina | CSS | H | 590 m | MPC · JPL |
| 346150 Nanyi | 2007 VE_{253} | Nanyi | November 5, 2007 | XuYi | PMO NEO Survey Program | EOS | 2.3 km | MPC · JPL |
| 346151 | 2007 VF_{253} | — | November 13, 2007 | Mount Lemmon | Mount Lemmon Survey | · | 4.0 km | MPC · JPL |
| 346152 | 2007 VD_{254} | — | November 14, 2007 | Kitt Peak | Spacewatch | · | 6.4 km | MPC · JPL |
| 346153 | 2007 VC_{260} | — | November 15, 2007 | Anderson Mesa | LONEOS | · | 1.9 km | MPC · JPL |
| 346154 | 2007 VH_{265} | — | November 13, 2007 | Kitt Peak | Spacewatch | · | 2.1 km | MPC · JPL |
| 346155 | 2007 VJ_{279} | — | November 14, 2007 | Kitt Peak | Spacewatch | · | 2.3 km | MPC · JPL |
| 346156 | 2007 VH_{281} | — | November 14, 2007 | Kitt Peak | Spacewatch | · | 3.3 km | MPC · JPL |
| 346157 | 2007 VW_{281} | — | November 14, 2007 | Kitt Peak | Spacewatch | · | 2.3 km | MPC · JPL |
| 346158 | 2007 VH_{282} | — | November 14, 2007 | Kitt Peak | Spacewatch | EOS | 2.1 km | MPC · JPL |
| 346159 | 2007 VH_{283} | — | November 14, 2007 | Kitt Peak | Spacewatch | THM | 2.4 km | MPC · JPL |
| 346160 | 2007 VQ_{285} | — | November 14, 2007 | Kitt Peak | Spacewatch | · | 2.0 km | MPC · JPL |
| 346161 | 2007 VT_{297} | — | November 11, 2007 | Catalina | CSS | · | 3.8 km | MPC · JPL |
| 346162 | 2007 VG_{303} | — | November 2, 2007 | Catalina | CSS | · | 2.8 km | MPC · JPL |
| 346163 | 2007 VZ_{307} | — | November 5, 2007 | Kitt Peak | Spacewatch | THM | 2.4 km | MPC · JPL |
| 346164 | 2007 VY_{308} | — | November 9, 2007 | Kitt Peak | Spacewatch | · | 5.6 km | MPC · JPL |
| 346165 | 2007 VB_{309} | — | November 9, 2007 | Mount Lemmon | Mount Lemmon Survey | 615 | 1.3 km | MPC · JPL |
| 346166 | 2007 VV_{312} | — | November 3, 2007 | Mount Lemmon | Mount Lemmon Survey | EOS | 2.6 km | MPC · JPL |
| 346167 | 2007 VC_{314} | — | November 1, 2007 | Kitt Peak | Spacewatch | · | 2.8 km | MPC · JPL |
| 346168 | 2007 VE_{318} | — | November 5, 2007 | Mount Lemmon | Mount Lemmon Survey | THM | 2.2 km | MPC · JPL |
| 346169 | 2007 VD_{320} | — | September 13, 2007 | Mount Lemmon | Mount Lemmon Survey | EOS | 2.2 km | MPC · JPL |
| 346170 | 2007 VA_{322} | — | September 29, 2001 | Palomar | NEAT | · | 3.4 km | MPC · JPL |
| 346171 | 2007 VG_{325} | — | November 1, 2007 | Kitt Peak | Spacewatch | · | 3.1 km | MPC · JPL |
| 346172 | 2007 VL_{326} | — | November 4, 2007 | Mount Lemmon | Mount Lemmon Survey | PHO | 1.7 km | MPC · JPL |
| 346173 | 2007 VU_{331} | — | November 7, 2007 | Kitt Peak | Spacewatch | · | 1.9 km | MPC · JPL |
| 346174 | 2007 VJ_{334} | — | November 13, 2007 | Kitt Peak | Spacewatch | · | 2.5 km | MPC · JPL |
| 346175 | 2007 VV_{334} | — | November 14, 2007 | Kitt Peak | Spacewatch | VER | 3.5 km | MPC · JPL |
| 346176 | 2007 WA_{2} | — | November 17, 2007 | Bisei SG Center | BATTeRS | · | 2.0 km | MPC · JPL |
| 346177 | 2007 WO_{8} | — | November 18, 2007 | Socorro | LINEAR | · | 2.0 km | MPC · JPL |
| 346178 | 2007 WZ_{17} | — | November 18, 2007 | Mount Lemmon | Mount Lemmon Survey | · | 4.0 km | MPC · JPL |
| 346179 | 2007 WL_{22} | — | November 17, 2007 | Kitt Peak | Spacewatch | · | 2.3 km | MPC · JPL |
| 346180 | 2007 WU_{24} | — | November 2, 2007 | Kitt Peak | Spacewatch | · | 3.0 km | MPC · JPL |
| 346181 | 2007 WP_{33} | — | November 19, 2007 | Mount Lemmon | Mount Lemmon Survey | · | 3.6 km | MPC · JPL |
| 346182 | 2007 WF_{40} | — | November 17, 2007 | Catalina | CSS | · | 2.4 km | MPC · JPL |
| 346183 | 2007 WE_{42} | — | November 18, 2007 | Mount Lemmon | Mount Lemmon Survey | · | 2.7 km | MPC · JPL |
| 346184 | 2007 WX_{55} | — | November 30, 2007 | Charleston | Astronomical Research Observatory | THM | 2.4 km | MPC · JPL |
| 346185 | 2007 WB_{56} | — | November 30, 2007 | Lulin | Yang, T.-C., Q. Ye | · | 5.1 km | MPC · JPL |
| 346186 | 2007 WH_{63} | — | November 20, 2007 | Mount Lemmon | Mount Lemmon Survey | · | 2.3 km | MPC · JPL |
| 346187 | 2007 WQ_{63} | — | November 21, 2007 | Mount Lemmon | Mount Lemmon Survey | · | 2.5 km | MPC · JPL |
| 346188 | 2007 XQ | — | November 4, 2007 | Mount Lemmon | Mount Lemmon Survey | EOS | 2.5 km | MPC · JPL |
| 346189 | 2007 XX_{1} | — | December 3, 2007 | Catalina | CSS | · | 4.1 km | MPC · JPL |
| 346190 | 2007 XN_{11} | — | December 4, 2007 | Anderson Mesa | LONEOS | · | 5.1 km | MPC · JPL |
| 346191 | 2007 XX_{11} | — | December 4, 2007 | Kitt Peak | Spacewatch | · | 4.6 km | MPC · JPL |
| 346192 | 2007 XY_{18} | — | October 14, 2007 | Mount Lemmon | Mount Lemmon Survey | · | 2.8 km | MPC · JPL |
| 346193 | 2007 XZ_{19} | — | December 12, 2007 | La Sagra | OAM | · | 2.1 km | MPC · JPL |
| 346194 | 2007 XW_{20} | — | December 13, 2007 | Socorro | LINEAR | H | 670 m | MPC · JPL |
| 346195 | 2007 XC_{24} | — | December 14, 2007 | Dauban | Chante-Perdrix | · | 2.4 km | MPC · JPL |
| 346196 | 2007 XQ_{24} | — | December 13, 2007 | Socorro | LINEAR | H | 570 m | MPC · JPL |
| 346197 | 2007 XH_{25} | — | December 15, 2007 | La Sagra | OAM | · | 2.1 km | MPC · JPL |
| 346198 | 2007 XR_{25} | — | December 15, 2007 | Kitt Peak | Spacewatch | · | 4.4 km | MPC · JPL |
| 346199 | 2007 XD_{27} | — | December 14, 2007 | Kitt Peak | Spacewatch | · | 5.0 km | MPC · JPL |
| 346200 | 2007 XD_{29} | — | December 15, 2007 | Kitt Peak | Spacewatch | · | 2.0 km | MPC · JPL |

== 346201–346300 ==
back to top

| Designation | | | Discovery | | | Properties | | Ref |
| Permanent | Provisional | Named after | Date | Site | Discoverer(s) | Category | Diam. | Ref |
|---|---|---|---|---|---|---|---|---|
| 346201 | 2007 XF_{31} | — | December 15, 2007 | Kitt Peak | Spacewatch | · | 3.3 km | MPC · JPL |
| 346202 | 2007 XZ_{33} | — | December 10, 2007 | Socorro | LINEAR | · | 3.8 km | MPC · JPL |
| 346203 | 2007 XR_{35} | — | December 13, 2007 | Socorro | LINEAR | · | 4.8 km | MPC · JPL |
| 346204 | 2007 XN_{44} | — | December 15, 2007 | Kitt Peak | Spacewatch | ELF | 4.3 km | MPC · JPL |
| 346205 | 2007 XF_{47} | — | December 15, 2007 | Kitt Peak | Spacewatch | · | 3.2 km | MPC · JPL |
| 346206 | 2007 XB_{53} | — | December 4, 2007 | Mount Lemmon | Mount Lemmon Survey | · | 3.1 km | MPC · JPL |
| 346207 | 2007 XB_{58} | — | December 5, 2007 | Kitt Peak | Spacewatch | · | 5.4 km | MPC · JPL |
| 346208 | 2007 XL_{58} | — | December 5, 2007 | Kitt Peak | Spacewatch | EOS | 2.3 km | MPC · JPL |
| 346209 | 2007 XZ_{58} | — | December 14, 2007 | Mount Lemmon | Mount Lemmon Survey | · | 2.7 km | MPC · JPL |
| 346210 | 2007 YY_{8} | — | December 16, 2007 | Mount Lemmon | Mount Lemmon Survey | · | 3.8 km | MPC · JPL |
| 346211 | 2007 YF_{10} | — | December 16, 2007 | Kitt Peak | Spacewatch | · | 2.5 km | MPC · JPL |
| 346212 | 2007 YS_{14} | — | November 4, 2007 | Kitt Peak | Spacewatch | H | 530 m | MPC · JPL |
| 346213 | 2007 YY_{22} | — | December 16, 2007 | Mount Lemmon | Mount Lemmon Survey | · | 3.2 km | MPC · JPL |
| 346214 | 2007 YP_{26} | — | December 18, 2007 | Mount Lemmon | Mount Lemmon Survey | · | 2.5 km | MPC · JPL |
| 346215 | 2007 YK_{31} | — | December 28, 2007 | Kitt Peak | Spacewatch | · | 4.6 km | MPC · JPL |
| 346216 | 2007 YW_{44} | — | December 30, 2007 | Mount Lemmon | Mount Lemmon Survey | H | 700 m | MPC · JPL |
| 346217 | 2007 YS_{47} | — | December 30, 2007 | La Sagra | OAM | H | 800 m | MPC · JPL |
| 346218 | 2007 YJ_{50} | — | December 28, 2007 | Kitt Peak | Spacewatch | THM | 2.2 km | MPC · JPL |
| 346219 | 2007 YC_{56} | — | December 29, 2007 | Lulin | LUSS | · | 3.9 km | MPC · JPL |
| 346220 | 2007 YK_{57} | — | December 5, 2007 | Kitt Peak | Spacewatch | · | 2.8 km | MPC · JPL |
| 346221 | 2007 YA_{59} | — | December 31, 2007 | Catalina | CSS | · | 3.1 km | MPC · JPL |
| 346222 | 2007 YN_{59} | — | December 18, 2007 | Mount Lemmon | Mount Lemmon Survey | H | 770 m | MPC · JPL |
| 346223 | 2007 YJ_{60} | — | December 16, 2007 | Catalina | CSS | · | 3.2 km | MPC · JPL |
| 346224 | 2007 YA_{62} | — | December 16, 2007 | Kitt Peak | Spacewatch | · | 2.1 km | MPC · JPL |
| 346225 | 2007 YB_{66} | — | December 30, 2007 | Mount Lemmon | Mount Lemmon Survey | · | 2.4 km | MPC · JPL |
| 346226 | 2007 YH_{69} | — | December 20, 2007 | Kitt Peak | Spacewatch | HYG | 2.9 km | MPC · JPL |
| 346227 | 2008 AK_{3} | — | January 8, 2008 | Altschwendt | W. Ries | EOS | 2.6 km | MPC · JPL |
| 346228 | 2008 AL_{6} | — | January 10, 2008 | Mount Lemmon | Mount Lemmon Survey | EOS | 2.3 km | MPC · JPL |
| 346229 | 2008 AK_{12} | — | January 10, 2008 | Mount Lemmon | Mount Lemmon Survey | · | 2.4 km | MPC · JPL |
| 346230 | 2008 AE_{17} | — | January 10, 2008 | Kitt Peak | Spacewatch | · | 2.7 km | MPC · JPL |
| 346231 | 2008 AX_{36} | — | January 10, 2008 | Catalina | CSS | · | 4.5 km | MPC · JPL |
| 346232 | 2008 AF_{37} | — | January 10, 2008 | Kitt Peak | Spacewatch | · | 2.8 km | MPC · JPL |
| 346233 | 2008 AY_{37} | — | January 10, 2008 | Mount Lemmon | Mount Lemmon Survey | · | 2.3 km | MPC · JPL |
| 346234 | 2008 AZ_{59} | — | January 11, 2008 | Catalina | CSS | VER | 3.7 km | MPC · JPL |
| 346235 | 2008 AC_{118} | — | January 13, 2008 | Catalina | CSS | · | 2.7 km | MPC · JPL |
| 346236 | 2008 BD_{5} | — | January 16, 2008 | Kitt Peak | Spacewatch | CYB | 4.5 km | MPC · JPL |
| 346237 | 2008 BW_{25} | — | January 30, 2008 | Catalina | CSS | · | 6.0 km | MPC · JPL |
| 346238 | 2008 BT_{39} | — | January 30, 2008 | Catalina | CSS | · | 2.8 km | MPC · JPL |
| 346239 | 2008 BP_{40} | — | January 31, 2008 | Socorro | LINEAR | DOR | 3.1 km | MPC · JPL |
| 346240 | 2008 BF_{43} | — | January 16, 2008 | Mount Lemmon | Mount Lemmon Survey | T_{j} (2.98) | 4.8 km | MPC · JPL |
| 346241 | 2008 BK_{43} | — | January 16, 2008 | Mayhill | Lowe, A. | · | 3.7 km | MPC · JPL |
| 346242 | 2008 BY_{49} | — | January 31, 2008 | Catalina | CSS | · | 3.0 km | MPC · JPL |
| 346243 | 2008 CO_{19} | — | February 6, 2008 | Catalina | CSS | · | 3.3 km | MPC · JPL |
| 346244 | 2008 CX_{77} | — | February 6, 2008 | Anderson Mesa | LONEOS | · | 3.7 km | MPC · JPL |
| 346245 | 2008 CY_{115} | — | February 10, 2008 | Mount Lemmon | Mount Lemmon Survey | L5 | 10 km | MPC · JPL |
| 346246 | 2008 CX_{176} | — | February 9, 2008 | Socorro | LINEAR | · | 4.8 km | MPC · JPL |
| 346247 | 2008 CC_{180} | — | February 9, 2008 | Anderson Mesa | LONEOS | · | 5.6 km | MPC · JPL |
| 346248 | 2008 CW_{186} | — | November 9, 2007 | Mount Lemmon | Mount Lemmon Survey | H | 720 m | MPC · JPL |
| 346249 | 2008 DY_{4} | — | February 27, 2008 | Lulin | LUSS | H | 670 m | MPC · JPL |
| 346250 | 2008 DP_{15} | — | February 27, 2008 | Mount Lemmon | Mount Lemmon Survey | · | 2.6 km | MPC · JPL |
| 346251 | 2008 DF_{57} | — | February 28, 2008 | Catalina | CSS | TIR | 4.0 km | MPC · JPL |
| 346252 | 2008 DC_{65} | — | February 28, 2008 | Catalina | CSS | TIR | 3.6 km | MPC · JPL |
| 346253 | 2008 DG_{84} | — | February 26, 2008 | Kitt Peak | Spacewatch | · | 3.1 km | MPC · JPL |
| 346254 | 2008 EY_{24} | — | March 3, 2008 | Mount Lemmon | Mount Lemmon Survey | · | 3.6 km | MPC · JPL |
| 346255 | 2008 EN_{29} | — | March 4, 2008 | Mount Lemmon | Mount Lemmon Survey | L5 | 13 km | MPC · JPL |
| 346256 | 2008 EP_{32} | — | March 1, 2008 | Catalina | CSS | · | 6.4 km | MPC · JPL |
| 346257 | 2008 ES_{65} | — | March 9, 2008 | Mount Lemmon | Mount Lemmon Survey | H | 760 m | MPC · JPL |
| 346258 | 2008 EB_{71} | — | March 6, 2008 | Mount Lemmon | Mount Lemmon Survey | · | 1.4 km | MPC · JPL |
| 346259 | 2008 ET_{81} | — | March 1, 2008 | Socorro | LINEAR | · | 2.6 km | MPC · JPL |
| 346260 | 2008 ER_{130} | — | March 11, 2008 | Kitt Peak | Spacewatch | 3:2 | 5.0 km | MPC · JPL |
| 346261 Alexandrescu | 2008 EK_{145} | Alexandrescu | March 12, 2008 | La Silla | EURONEAR | · | 690 m | MPC · JPL |
| 346262 | 2008 FK_{10} | — | March 26, 2008 | Kitt Peak | Spacewatch | · | 5.6 km | MPC · JPL |
| 346263 | 2008 FR_{83} | — | March 28, 2008 | Kitt Peak | Spacewatch | 3:2 · SHU | 5.9 km | MPC · JPL |
| 346264 | 2008 FK_{100} | — | March 30, 2008 | Kitt Peak | Spacewatch | L5 | 9.4 km | MPC · JPL |
| 346265 | 2008 FA_{107} | — | March 31, 2008 | Kitt Peak | Spacewatch | 3:2 | 4.9 km | MPC · JPL |
| 346266 | 2008 FX_{125} | — | March 31, 2008 | Kitt Peak | Spacewatch | · | 1.1 km | MPC · JPL |
| 346267 | 2008 FA_{131} | — | March 28, 2008 | Kitt Peak | Spacewatch | L5 | 10 km | MPC · JPL |
| 346268 | 2008 FB_{134} | — | March 28, 2008 | Kitt Peak | Spacewatch | L5 | 9.3 km | MPC · JPL |
| 346269 | 2008 GS_{38} | — | April 3, 2008 | Mount Lemmon | Mount Lemmon Survey | · | 760 m | MPC · JPL |
| 346270 | 2008 GR_{40} | — | April 4, 2008 | Kitt Peak | Spacewatch | V | 630 m | MPC · JPL |
| 346271 | 2008 GZ_{71} | — | March 4, 2008 | Mount Lemmon | Mount Lemmon Survey | · | 610 m | MPC · JPL |
| 346272 | 2008 GT_{74} | — | April 7, 2008 | Kitt Peak | Spacewatch | · | 660 m | MPC · JPL |
| 346273 | 2008 GB_{82} | — | April 8, 2008 | Kitt Peak | Spacewatch | · | 660 m | MPC · JPL |
| 346274 | 2008 GS_{99} | — | September 28, 2000 | Kitt Peak | Spacewatch | L5 | 7.7 km | MPC · JPL |
| 346275 | 2008 GT_{137} | — | April 7, 2008 | Kitt Peak | Spacewatch | · | 780 m | MPC · JPL |
| 346276 | 2008 GA_{140} | — | May 19, 2005 | Palomar | NEAT | · | 1.2 km | MPC · JPL |
| 346277 | 2008 GE_{140} | — | April 6, 2008 | Mount Lemmon | Mount Lemmon Survey | NYS | 910 m | MPC · JPL |
| 346278 | 2008 GR_{141} | — | March 19, 2007 | Mount Lemmon | Mount Lemmon Survey | L5 | 10 km | MPC · JPL |
| 346279 | 2008 HQ_{10} | — | April 24, 2008 | Kitt Peak | Spacewatch | · | 500 m | MPC · JPL |
| 346280 | 2008 HU_{35} | — | April 29, 2008 | Mount Lemmon | Mount Lemmon Survey | · | 790 m | MPC · JPL |
| 346281 | 2008 JV_{4} | — | May 2, 2008 | Catalina | CSS | · | 820 m | MPC · JPL |
| 346282 | 2008 JL_{26} | — | May 12, 2008 | Mount Lemmon | Mount Lemmon Survey | · | 6.1 km | MPC · JPL |
| 346283 | 2008 JR_{32} | — | May 7, 2008 | Kitt Peak | Spacewatch | · | 590 m | MPC · JPL |
| 346284 | 2008 JK_{36} | — | May 3, 2008 | Mount Lemmon | Mount Lemmon Survey | · | 630 m | MPC · JPL |
| 346285 | 2008 KN_{19} | — | May 28, 2008 | Mount Lemmon | Mount Lemmon Survey | · | 880 m | MPC · JPL |
| 346286 | 2008 KF_{27} | — | May 30, 2008 | Kitt Peak | Spacewatch | · | 1.4 km | MPC · JPL |
| 346287 | 2008 LP_{11} | — | November 20, 2006 | Kitt Peak | Spacewatch | · | 660 m | MPC · JPL |
| 346288 | 2008 NP_{2} | — | July 9, 2008 | La Sagra | OAM | · | 1.1 km | MPC · JPL |
| 346289 | 2008 NY_{3} | — | July 14, 2008 | Charleston | R. Holmes | · | 1.3 km | MPC · JPL |
| 346290 | 2008 OF_{10} | — | July 28, 2008 | Hibiscus | S. F. Hönig, Teamo, N. | · | 1.4 km | MPC · JPL |
| 346291 | 2008 OM_{20} | — | July 29, 2008 | Kitt Peak | Spacewatch | NYS | 1.3 km | MPC · JPL |
| 346292 | 2008 OG_{21} | — | July 30, 2008 | Kitt Peak | Spacewatch | · | 1.0 km | MPC · JPL |
| 346293 | 2008 PG_{3} | — | August 4, 2008 | Vicques | M. Ory | · | 1.5 km | MPC · JPL |
| 346294 | 2008 PH_{6} | — | April 12, 2004 | Kitt Peak | Spacewatch | MAS | 590 m | MPC · JPL |
| 346295 | 2008 PW_{7} | — | August 5, 2008 | La Sagra | OAM | · | 1.2 km | MPC · JPL |
| 346296 | 2008 PA_{9} | — | August 6, 2008 | Dauban | Kugel, F. | · | 840 m | MPC · JPL |
| 346297 | 2008 PK_{12} | — | August 8, 2008 | La Sagra | OAM | HNS | 1.6 km | MPC · JPL |
| 346298 | 2008 PH_{15} | — | August 10, 2008 | La Sagra | OAM | · | 790 m | MPC · JPL |
| 346299 | 2008 PS_{21} | — | August 7, 2008 | Kitt Peak | Spacewatch | · | 1.5 km | MPC · JPL |
| 346300 | 2008 QK | — | August 20, 2008 | Hibiscus | Teamo, N. | V | 760 m | MPC · JPL |

== 346301–346400 ==
back to top

| Designation | | | Discovery | | | Properties | | Ref |
| Permanent | Provisional | Named after | Date | Site | Discoverer(s) | Category | Diam. | Ref |
|---|---|---|---|---|---|---|---|---|
| 346301 | 2008 QD_{2} | — | August 24, 2008 | La Sagra | OAM | · | 1.4 km | MPC · JPL |
| 346302 | 2008 QS_{3} | — | August 25, 2008 | Piszkéstető | K. Sárneczky | MAS | 830 m | MPC · JPL |
| 346303 | 2008 QZ_{6} | — | August 25, 2008 | Parc National des Cévennes | C. Demeautis, J.-M. Lopez | MAS | 730 m | MPC · JPL |
| 346304 | 2008 QV_{9} | — | August 26, 2008 | La Sagra | OAM | MAS | 740 m | MPC · JPL |
| 346305 | 2008 QW_{9} | — | August 26, 2008 | Dauban | Kugel, F. | MAS | 760 m | MPC · JPL |
| 346306 | 2008 QF_{10} | — | August 26, 2008 | La Sagra | OAM | NYS | 1.1 km | MPC · JPL |
| 346307 | 2008 QK_{10} | — | August 26, 2008 | La Sagra | OAM | · | 2.1 km | MPC · JPL |
| 346308 | 2008 QA_{11} | — | August 26, 2008 | La Sagra | OAM | NYS | 1.2 km | MPC · JPL |
| 346309 | 2008 QK_{12} | — | August 26, 2008 | La Sagra | OAM | · | 1.7 km | MPC · JPL |
| 346310 | 2008 QS_{12} | — | August 7, 2008 | Kitt Peak | Spacewatch | MAS | 710 m | MPC · JPL |
| 346311 | 2008 QJ_{13} | — | August 27, 2008 | La Sagra | OAM | · | 1.3 km | MPC · JPL |
| 346312 | 2008 QB_{14} | — | August 21, 2008 | Kitt Peak | Spacewatch | · | 1.1 km | MPC · JPL |
| 346313 | 2008 QK_{17} | — | August 27, 2008 | La Sagra | OAM | NYS | 1.2 km | MPC · JPL |
| 346314 | 2008 QV_{19} | — | August 29, 2008 | Taunus | Karge, S., R. Kling | V | 620 m | MPC · JPL |
| 346315 | 2008 QE_{24} | — | August 30, 2008 | Sandlot | G. Hug | · | 880 m | MPC · JPL |
| 346316 | 2008 QM_{26} | — | August 29, 2008 | La Sagra | OAM | MAS | 660 m | MPC · JPL |
| 346317 | 2008 QC_{31} | — | August 30, 2008 | Socorro | LINEAR | · | 1.4 km | MPC · JPL |
| 346318 Elektrėnai | 2008 QX_{32} | Elektrėnai | August 31, 2008 | Moletai | K. Černis, E. Cernis | · | 1.3 km | MPC · JPL |
| 346319 | 2008 QX_{35} | — | August 21, 2008 | Kitt Peak | Spacewatch | · | 1.0 km | MPC · JPL |
| 346320 | 2008 QO_{39} | — | August 24, 2008 | Kitt Peak | Spacewatch | · | 2.7 km | MPC · JPL |
| 346321 | 2008 QY_{39} | — | August 26, 2008 | La Sagra | OAM | · | 1.2 km | MPC · JPL |
| 346322 | 2008 QW_{41} | — | August 26, 2008 | La Sagra | OAM | · | 2.3 km | MPC · JPL |
| 346323 | 2008 QM_{48} | — | August 24, 2008 | Kitt Peak | Spacewatch | (2076) | 1.1 km | MPC · JPL |
| 346324 | 2008 RF | — | September 1, 2008 | Hibiscus | S. F. Hönig, Teamo, N. | · | 1.4 km | MPC · JPL |
| 346325 | 2008 RN_{1} | — | September 3, 2008 | Hibiscus | S. F. Hönig, Teamo, N. | · | 1.7 km | MPC · JPL |
| 346326 | 2008 RX_{4} | — | September 2, 2008 | Kitt Peak | Spacewatch | NYS | 1.2 km | MPC · JPL |
| 346327 | 2008 RM_{5} | — | September 2, 2008 | Kitt Peak | Spacewatch | · | 1.2 km | MPC · JPL |
| 346328 | 2008 RD_{15} | — | August 24, 2008 | Kitt Peak | Spacewatch | · | 1.5 km | MPC · JPL |
| 346329 | 2008 RZ_{18} | — | August 15, 2004 | Campo Imperatore | CINEOS | · | 1.1 km | MPC · JPL |
| 346330 | 2008 RZ_{21} | — | September 3, 2008 | La Sagra | OAM | · | 1 km | MPC · JPL |
| 346331 | 2008 RG_{27} | — | September 8, 2008 | Dauban | Kugel, F. | · | 3.0 km | MPC · JPL |
| 346332 | 2008 RW_{29} | — | September 2, 2008 | Kitt Peak | Spacewatch | · | 1.5 km | MPC · JPL |
| 346333 | 2008 RK_{31} | — | September 2, 2008 | Kitt Peak | Spacewatch | NYS | 1.1 km | MPC · JPL |
| 346334 | 2008 RT_{39} | — | September 2, 2008 | Kitt Peak | Spacewatch | · | 1.3 km | MPC · JPL |
| 346335 | 2008 RS_{41} | — | September 2, 2008 | Kitt Peak | Spacewatch | · | 1.2 km | MPC · JPL |
| 346336 | 2008 RO_{44} | — | September 2, 2008 | Kitt Peak | Spacewatch | MAS | 650 m | MPC · JPL |
| 346337 | 2008 RK_{48} | — | September 6, 2008 | Catalina | CSS | V | 780 m | MPC · JPL |
| 346338 | 2008 RM_{50} | — | September 3, 2008 | Kitt Peak | Spacewatch | · | 980 m | MPC · JPL |
| 346339 | 2008 RE_{58} | — | September 3, 2008 | Kitt Peak | Spacewatch | · | 1.3 km | MPC · JPL |
| 346340 | 2008 RP_{68} | — | September 4, 2008 | Kitt Peak | Spacewatch | · | 1.7 km | MPC · JPL |
| 346341 | 2008 RE_{69} | — | September 4, 2008 | Kitt Peak | Spacewatch | · | 1.2 km | MPC · JPL |
| 346342 | 2008 RA_{72} | — | September 6, 2008 | Catalina | CSS | V | 710 m | MPC · JPL |
| 346343 | 2008 RJ_{77} | — | September 6, 2008 | Catalina | CSS | · | 1.4 km | MPC · JPL |
| 346344 | 2008 RA_{81} | — | September 3, 2008 | Kitt Peak | Spacewatch | · | 3.3 km | MPC · JPL |
| 346345 | 2008 RB_{86} | — | September 5, 2008 | Kitt Peak | Spacewatch | · | 1.7 km | MPC · JPL |
| 346346 | 2008 RD_{98} | — | September 7, 2008 | Mount Lemmon | Mount Lemmon Survey | · | 1.2 km | MPC · JPL |
| 346347 | 2008 RA_{110} | — | September 3, 2008 | Kitt Peak | Spacewatch | · | 910 m | MPC · JPL |
| 346348 | 2008 RY_{111} | — | September 4, 2008 | Kitt Peak | Spacewatch | · | 1.4 km | MPC · JPL |
| 346349 | 2008 RN_{114} | — | September 6, 2008 | Mount Lemmon | Mount Lemmon Survey | · | 1.1 km | MPC · JPL |
| 346350 | 2008 RX_{114} | — | September 6, 2008 | Mount Lemmon | Mount Lemmon Survey | · | 1.2 km | MPC · JPL |
| 346351 | 2008 RB_{118} | — | September 9, 2008 | Mount Lemmon | Mount Lemmon Survey | AEO | 1.0 km | MPC · JPL |
| 346352 | 2008 RM_{118} | — | September 9, 2008 | Mount Lemmon | Mount Lemmon Survey | NYS · fast? | 1.4 km | MPC · JPL |
| 346353 | 2008 RU_{120} | — | September 9, 2008 | Mount Lemmon | Mount Lemmon Survey | · | 1.2 km | MPC · JPL |
| 346354 | 2008 RO_{129} | — | September 9, 2008 | Mount Lemmon | Mount Lemmon Survey | (5) | 1.2 km | MPC · JPL |
| 346355 | 2008 RH_{130} | — | September 9, 2008 | Mount Lemmon | Mount Lemmon Survey | · | 2.0 km | MPC · JPL |
| 346356 | 2008 RM_{133} | — | September 6, 2008 | Catalina | CSS | · | 1.7 km | MPC · JPL |
| 346357 | 2008 RR_{137} | — | September 5, 2008 | Kitt Peak | Spacewatch | · | 1.4 km | MPC · JPL |
| 346358 | 2008 RV_{138} | — | September 6, 2008 | Catalina | CSS | · | 1.3 km | MPC · JPL |
| 346359 | 2008 RW_{138} | — | September 6, 2008 | Catalina | CSS | · | 2.4 km | MPC · JPL |
| 346360 | 2008 RF_{139} | — | September 7, 2008 | Mount Lemmon | Mount Lemmon Survey | · | 1.0 km | MPC · JPL |
| 346361 | 2008 RP_{140} | — | September 9, 2008 | Mount Lemmon | Mount Lemmon Survey | · | 1.9 km | MPC · JPL |
| 346362 | 2008 RS_{141} | — | September 7, 2008 | Mount Lemmon | Mount Lemmon Survey | NYS | 1.1 km | MPC · JPL |
| 346363 | 2008 ST_{2} | — | September 23, 2008 | Sierra Stars | Tozzi, F. | NYS | 1.5 km | MPC · JPL |
| 346364 | 2008 SZ_{3} | — | September 22, 2008 | Socorro | LINEAR | NYS | 1.1 km | MPC · JPL |
| 346365 | 2008 SR_{6} | — | September 22, 2008 | Socorro | LINEAR | · | 1.2 km | MPC · JPL |
| 346366 | 2008 SW_{6} | — | September 22, 2008 | Socorro | LINEAR | · | 2.0 km | MPC · JPL |
| 346367 | 2008 SF_{18} | — | September 19, 2008 | Kitt Peak | Spacewatch | · | 1.5 km | MPC · JPL |
| 346368 | 2008 SG_{18} | — | September 19, 2008 | Kitt Peak | Spacewatch | · | 1.6 km | MPC · JPL |
| 346369 | 2008 SQ_{18} | — | November 29, 1997 | Kitt Peak | Spacewatch | · | 1.1 km | MPC · JPL |
| 346370 | 2008 SE_{27} | — | September 19, 2008 | Kitt Peak | Spacewatch | NYS | 1.1 km | MPC · JPL |
| 346371 | 2008 SO_{29} | — | September 19, 2008 | Kitt Peak | Spacewatch | · | 1.3 km | MPC · JPL |
| 346372 | 2008 SW_{33} | — | October 10, 1993 | Kitt Peak | Spacewatch | · | 1.2 km | MPC · JPL |
| 346373 | 2008 SA_{39} | — | September 20, 2008 | Kitt Peak | Spacewatch | NYS | 1.3 km | MPC · JPL |
| 346374 | 2008 SZ_{39} | — | September 20, 2008 | Kitt Peak | Spacewatch | · | 1.7 km | MPC · JPL |
| 346375 | 2008 SH_{46} | — | September 20, 2008 | Kitt Peak | Spacewatch | V | 720 m | MPC · JPL |
| 346376 | 2008 SL_{46} | — | September 20, 2008 | Kitt Peak | Spacewatch | NYS | 1.3 km | MPC · JPL |
| 346377 | 2008 SM_{46} | — | September 20, 2008 | Kitt Peak | Spacewatch | · | 1.3 km | MPC · JPL |
| 346378 | 2008 SB_{47} | — | September 20, 2008 | Kitt Peak | Spacewatch | · | 1.7 km | MPC · JPL |
| 346379 | 2008 SQ_{48} | — | September 20, 2008 | Mount Lemmon | Mount Lemmon Survey | · | 1.1 km | MPC · JPL |
| 346380 | 2008 SC_{53} | — | September 20, 2008 | Mount Lemmon | Mount Lemmon Survey | · | 1.1 km | MPC · JPL |
| 346381 | 2008 SD_{54} | — | September 20, 2008 | Mount Lemmon | Mount Lemmon Survey | · | 1.8 km | MPC · JPL |
| 346382 | 2008 SN_{56} | — | September 20, 2008 | Mount Lemmon | Mount Lemmon Survey | NYS | 980 m | MPC · JPL |
| 346383 | 2008 SO_{56} | — | September 20, 2008 | Mount Lemmon | Mount Lemmon Survey | · | 1.8 km | MPC · JPL |
| 346384 | 2008 SW_{60} | — | September 20, 2008 | Catalina | CSS | · | 1.2 km | MPC · JPL |
| 346385 | 2008 SW_{62} | — | September 21, 2008 | Kitt Peak | Spacewatch | NYS | 1.5 km | MPC · JPL |
| 346386 | 2008 SM_{64} | — | September 21, 2008 | Catalina | CSS | · | 1.5 km | MPC · JPL |
| 346387 | 2008 SO_{64} | — | September 21, 2008 | Catalina | CSS | · | 2.1 km | MPC · JPL |
| 346388 | 2008 SS_{71} | — | September 22, 2008 | Goodricke-Pigott | R. A. Tucker | · | 1.2 km | MPC · JPL |
| 346389 | 2008 SF_{76} | — | August 24, 2008 | Kitt Peak | Spacewatch | · | 1.1 km | MPC · JPL |
| 346390 | 2008 SZ_{77} | — | September 3, 2008 | Kitt Peak | Spacewatch | · | 1.1 km | MPC · JPL |
| 346391 | 2008 SV_{84} | — | September 28, 2008 | Wrightwood | J. W. Young | EUN | 1.3 km | MPC · JPL |
| 346392 | 2008 SK_{87} | — | September 20, 2008 | Catalina | CSS | · | 1.4 km | MPC · JPL |
| 346393 | 2008 SQ_{87} | — | September 20, 2008 | Catalina | CSS | · | 1.5 km | MPC · JPL |
| 346394 | 2008 SL_{100} | — | September 21, 2008 | Kitt Peak | Spacewatch | · | 1.5 km | MPC · JPL |
| 346395 | 2008 SE_{101} | — | September 21, 2008 | Kitt Peak | Spacewatch | · | 1.1 km | MPC · JPL |
| 346396 | 2008 SY_{106} | — | September 21, 2008 | Kitt Peak | Spacewatch | NYS | 1.1 km | MPC · JPL |
| 346397 | 2008 SC_{116} | — | September 22, 2008 | Kitt Peak | Spacewatch | · | 2.0 km | MPC · JPL |
| 346398 | 2008 SB_{120} | — | September 22, 2008 | Mount Lemmon | Mount Lemmon Survey | · | 1.1 km | MPC · JPL |
| 346399 | 2008 SO_{120} | — | September 22, 2008 | Mount Lemmon | Mount Lemmon Survey | KOR | 1.6 km | MPC · JPL |
| 346400 | 2008 SA_{129} | — | September 22, 2008 | Kitt Peak | Spacewatch | · | 1.4 km | MPC · JPL |

== 346401–346500 ==
back to top

| Designation | | | Discovery | | | Properties | | Ref |
| Permanent | Provisional | Named after | Date | Site | Discoverer(s) | Category | Diam. | Ref |
|---|---|---|---|---|---|---|---|---|
| 346401 | 2008 SC_{137} | — | September 23, 2008 | Mount Lemmon | Mount Lemmon Survey | HOF | 2.4 km | MPC · JPL |
| 346402 | 2008 SF_{148} | — | September 25, 2008 | Bergisch Gladbach | W. Bickel | · | 1.0 km | MPC · JPL |
| 346403 | 2008 SL_{149} | — | September 24, 2008 | Bergisch Gladbach | W. Bickel | GEF | 1.5 km | MPC · JPL |
| 346404 | 2008 SB_{152} | — | September 26, 2008 | Bisei SG Center | BATTeRS | · | 1.7 km | MPC · JPL |
| 346405 | 2008 SU_{152} | — | September 22, 2008 | Socorro | LINEAR | ADE | 2.0 km | MPC · JPL |
| 346406 | 2008 SO_{154} | — | September 19, 2008 | Kitt Peak | Spacewatch | · | 1.2 km | MPC · JPL |
| 346407 | 2008 SE_{156} | — | September 23, 2008 | Socorro | LINEAR | · | 1.2 km | MPC · JPL |
| 346408 | 2008 SF_{156} | — | September 23, 2008 | Socorro | LINEAR | · | 1.4 km | MPC · JPL |
| 346409 | 2008 SG_{156} | — | September 23, 2008 | Socorro | LINEAR | · | 1.4 km | MPC · JPL |
| 346410 | 2008 SM_{159} | — | September 24, 2008 | Socorro | LINEAR | · | 1.9 km | MPC · JPL |
| 346411 | 2008 SP_{164} | — | September 28, 2008 | Socorro | LINEAR | · | 2.7 km | MPC · JPL |
| 346412 | 2008 SW_{164} | — | September 28, 2008 | Socorro | LINEAR | · | 2.5 km | MPC · JPL |
| 346413 | 2008 SK_{166} | — | September 28, 2008 | Socorro | LINEAR | · | 2.1 km | MPC · JPL |
| 346414 | 2008 SP_{178} | — | September 23, 2008 | Siding Spring | SSS | NYS | 1.1 km | MPC · JPL |
| 346415 | 2008 SZ_{180} | — | September 24, 2008 | Kitt Peak | Spacewatch | · | 1.2 km | MPC · JPL |
| 346416 | 2008 SH_{182} | — | September 24, 2008 | Kitt Peak | Spacewatch | MAS | 760 m | MPC · JPL |
| 346417 | 2008 SJ_{182} | — | January 14, 2002 | Kitt Peak | Spacewatch | MAS | 730 m | MPC · JPL |
| 346418 | 2008 SW_{183} | — | September 24, 2008 | Kitt Peak | Spacewatch | · | 1.3 km | MPC · JPL |
| 346419 | 2008 SC_{192} | — | September 25, 2008 | Kitt Peak | Spacewatch | · | 1.8 km | MPC · JPL |
| 346420 | 2008 SK_{193} | — | September 25, 2008 | Kitt Peak | Spacewatch | V | 790 m | MPC · JPL |
| 346421 | 2008 SO_{193} | — | September 25, 2008 | Kitt Peak | Spacewatch | · | 2.9 km | MPC · JPL |
| 346422 | 2008 SP_{196} | — | September 25, 2008 | Kitt Peak | Spacewatch | · | 1.1 km | MPC · JPL |
| 346423 | 2008 ST_{197} | — | September 25, 2008 | Kitt Peak | Spacewatch | · | 1.0 km | MPC · JPL |
| 346424 | 2008 SB_{205} | — | September 26, 2008 | Kitt Peak | Spacewatch | · | 1.4 km | MPC · JPL |
| 346425 | 2008 SF_{206} | — | September 26, 2008 | Kitt Peak | Spacewatch | · | 1.5 km | MPC · JPL |
| 346426 | 2008 SF_{219} | — | September 30, 2008 | La Sagra | OAM | · | 1.4 km | MPC · JPL |
| 346427 | 2008 SL_{224} | — | September 26, 2008 | Kitt Peak | Spacewatch | · | 2.0 km | MPC · JPL |
| 346428 | 2008 ST_{235} | — | September 28, 2008 | Mount Lemmon | Mount Lemmon Survey | · | 1.4 km | MPC · JPL |
| 346429 | 2008 SM_{238} | — | September 29, 2008 | Kitt Peak | Spacewatch | NYS | 1.3 km | MPC · JPL |
| 346430 | 2008 SE_{242} | — | September 10, 2008 | Kitt Peak | Spacewatch | MAS | 730 m | MPC · JPL |
| 346431 | 2008 SJ_{242} | — | September 29, 2008 | Kitt Peak | Spacewatch | · | 990 m | MPC · JPL |
| 346432 | 2008 SA_{248} | — | September 20, 2008 | Kitt Peak | Spacewatch | · | 970 m | MPC · JPL |
| 346433 | 2008 SY_{248} | — | June 3, 2003 | Kitt Peak | Spacewatch | · | 990 m | MPC · JPL |
| 346434 | 2008 SK_{253} | — | September 21, 2008 | Kitt Peak | Spacewatch | · | 1.7 km | MPC · JPL |
| 346435 | 2008 SZ_{254} | — | September 23, 2008 | Mount Lemmon | Mount Lemmon Survey | · | 2.8 km | MPC · JPL |
| 346436 | 2008 SU_{258} | — | September 22, 2008 | Catalina | CSS | V | 790 m | MPC · JPL |
| 346437 | 2008 SZ_{265} | — | September 29, 2008 | Kitt Peak | Spacewatch | · | 2.1 km | MPC · JPL |
| 346438 | 2008 SX_{267} | — | September 23, 2008 | Kitt Peak | Spacewatch | · | 1.6 km | MPC · JPL |
| 346439 | 2008 SC_{282} | — | September 25, 2008 | Mount Lemmon | Mount Lemmon Survey | · | 1.1 km | MPC · JPL |
| 346440 | 2008 SJ_{302} | — | September 23, 2008 | Catalina | CSS | EUN | 2.1 km | MPC · JPL |
| 346441 | 2008 SH_{308} | — | September 30, 2008 | Mount Lemmon | Mount Lemmon Survey | · | 2.8 km | MPC · JPL |
| 346442 | 2008 TO_{2} | — | October 4, 2008 | Catalina | CSS | · | 2.4 km | MPC · JPL |
| 346443 | 2008 TP_{7} | — | October 3, 2008 | La Sagra | OAM | V | 690 m | MPC · JPL |
| 346444 | 2008 TD_{8} | — | October 4, 2008 | La Sagra | OAM | NYS | 1.3 km | MPC · JPL |
| 346445 | 2008 TW_{15} | — | September 2, 2008 | Kitt Peak | Spacewatch | · | 1.5 km | MPC · JPL |
| 346446 | 2008 TL_{19} | — | October 1, 2008 | Mount Lemmon | Mount Lemmon Survey | · | 1.2 km | MPC · JPL |
| 346447 | 2008 TM_{20} | — | September 22, 2008 | Mount Lemmon | Mount Lemmon Survey | (5) | 1.1 km | MPC · JPL |
| 346448 | 2008 TL_{21} | — | October 1, 2008 | Mount Lemmon | Mount Lemmon Survey | · | 1.2 km | MPC · JPL |
| 346449 | 2008 TF_{22} | — | October 1, 2008 | Mount Lemmon | Mount Lemmon Survey | · | 1.2 km | MPC · JPL |
| 346450 | 2008 TQ_{23} | — | April 25, 2007 | Mount Lemmon | Mount Lemmon Survey | · | 1.6 km | MPC · JPL |
| 346451 | 2008 TY_{26} | — | October 10, 2008 | Mount Lemmon | Mount Lemmon Survey | JUN | 1.3 km | MPC · JPL |
| 346452 | 2008 TW_{39} | — | October 1, 2008 | Kitt Peak | Spacewatch | · | 1.9 km | MPC · JPL |
| 346453 | 2008 TJ_{47} | — | October 1, 2008 | Kitt Peak | Spacewatch | · | 2.1 km | MPC · JPL |
| 346454 | 2008 TE_{50} | — | October 2, 2008 | Kitt Peak | Spacewatch | MAS | 780 m | MPC · JPL |
| 346455 | 2008 TE_{60} | — | October 2, 2008 | Kitt Peak | Spacewatch | · | 1.1 km | MPC · JPL |
| 346456 | 2008 TF_{66} | — | October 2, 2008 | Kitt Peak | Spacewatch | · | 1.2 km | MPC · JPL |
| 346457 | 2008 TR_{72} | — | October 2, 2008 | Kitt Peak | Spacewatch | · | 1.7 km | MPC · JPL |
| 346458 | 2008 TB_{78} | — | October 2, 2008 | Mount Lemmon | Mount Lemmon Survey | MAS | 710 m | MPC · JPL |
| 346459 | 2008 TR_{84} | — | October 3, 2008 | Kitt Peak | Spacewatch | · | 1 km | MPC · JPL |
| 346460 | 2008 TZ_{84} | — | October 3, 2008 | Kitt Peak | Spacewatch | · | 1.2 km | MPC · JPL |
| 346461 | 2008 TK_{86} | — | October 3, 2008 | Mount Lemmon | Mount Lemmon Survey | · | 1.6 km | MPC · JPL |
| 346462 | 2008 TZ_{90} | — | October 3, 2008 | Kitt Peak | Spacewatch | · | 820 m | MPC · JPL |
| 346463 | 2008 TB_{94} | — | October 5, 2008 | La Sagra | OAM | NYS | 1.1 km | MPC · JPL |
| 346464 | 2008 TC_{116} | — | October 6, 2008 | Catalina | CSS | V | 640 m | MPC · JPL |
| 346465 | 2008 TN_{120} | — | October 7, 2008 | Mount Lemmon | Mount Lemmon Survey | · | 1.6 km | MPC · JPL |
| 346466 | 2008 TZ_{120} | — | October 7, 2008 | Kitt Peak | Spacewatch | (5) | 1.0 km | MPC · JPL |
| 346467 | 2008 TG_{131} | — | October 8, 2008 | Mount Lemmon | Mount Lemmon Survey | · | 1.8 km | MPC · JPL |
| 346468 | 2008 TF_{134} | — | October 8, 2008 | Mount Lemmon | Mount Lemmon Survey | · | 1.4 km | MPC · JPL |
| 346469 | 2008 TR_{151} | — | October 9, 2008 | Mount Lemmon | Mount Lemmon Survey | · | 1.5 km | MPC · JPL |
| 346470 | 2008 TW_{158} | — | October 10, 2008 | Kitt Peak | Spacewatch | · | 1.2 km | MPC · JPL |
| 346471 Sleeperhennig | 2008 TA_{160} | Sleeperhennig | October 1, 2008 | Charleston | Astronomical Research Observatory | · | 2.2 km | MPC · JPL |
| 346472 | 2008 TH_{165} | — | October 2, 2008 | Kitt Peak | Spacewatch | (5) | 1.1 km | MPC · JPL |
| 346473 | 2008 TH_{168} | — | October 1, 2008 | Catalina | CSS | MAR | 1.4 km | MPC · JPL |
| 346474 | 2008 TK_{180} | — | October 2, 2008 | Catalina | CSS | · | 1.7 km | MPC · JPL |
| 346475 | 2008 TM_{182} | — | October 1, 2008 | Kitt Peak | Spacewatch | · | 1.5 km | MPC · JPL |
| 346476 | 2008 TJ_{183} | — | October 2, 2008 | Socorro | LINEAR | V | 1.0 km | MPC · JPL |
| 346477 | 2008 TO_{185} | — | October 6, 2008 | Mount Lemmon | Mount Lemmon Survey | · | 1.5 km | MPC · JPL |
| 346478 | 2008 TN_{186} | — | October 7, 2008 | Mount Lemmon | Mount Lemmon Survey | · | 1.9 km | MPC · JPL |
| 346479 | 2008 UG | — | October 17, 2008 | Siding Spring | SSS | · | 1.7 km | MPC · JPL |
| 346480 | 2008 UK_{1} | — | October 20, 2008 | Goodricke-Pigott | R. A. Tucker | · | 1.7 km | MPC · JPL |
| 346481 | 2008 UN_{5} | — | October 25, 2008 | Catalina | CSS | · | 2.5 km | MPC · JPL |
| 346482 | 2008 UZ_{10} | — | October 17, 2008 | Kitt Peak | Spacewatch | · | 1.5 km | MPC · JPL |
| 346483 | 2008 UX_{29} | — | October 20, 2008 | Kitt Peak | Spacewatch | · | 2.7 km | MPC · JPL |
| 346484 | 2008 UH_{32} | — | October 20, 2008 | Kitt Peak | Spacewatch | · | 1.3 km | MPC · JPL |
| 346485 | 2008 UY_{38} | — | October 20, 2008 | Kitt Peak | Spacewatch | · | 1.0 km | MPC · JPL |
| 346486 | 2008 UE_{40} | — | September 22, 2008 | Mount Lemmon | Mount Lemmon Survey | · | 1.6 km | MPC · JPL |
| 346487 | 2008 UJ_{47} | — | October 20, 2008 | Kitt Peak | Spacewatch | · | 1.8 km | MPC · JPL |
| 346488 | 2008 UB_{48} | — | October 20, 2008 | Mount Lemmon | Mount Lemmon Survey | EUN | 950 m | MPC · JPL |
| 346489 | 2008 UN_{52} | — | October 20, 2008 | Kitt Peak | Spacewatch | · | 2.2 km | MPC · JPL |
| 346490 | 2008 UD_{60} | — | October 21, 2008 | Kitt Peak | Spacewatch | · | 1.1 km | MPC · JPL |
| 346491 | 2008 UA_{62} | — | October 21, 2008 | Kitt Peak | Spacewatch | EOS | 2.7 km | MPC · JPL |
| 346492 | 2008 UJ_{67} | — | February 24, 2006 | Mount Lemmon | Mount Lemmon Survey | (5) | 1.5 km | MPC · JPL |
| 346493 | 2008 UK_{71} | — | October 21, 2008 | Mount Lemmon | Mount Lemmon Survey | · | 2.0 km | MPC · JPL |
| 346494 | 2008 UH_{74} | — | October 21, 2008 | Kitt Peak | Spacewatch | · | 3.4 km | MPC · JPL |
| 346495 | 2008 UL_{75} | — | October 21, 2008 | Kitt Peak | Spacewatch | · | 1.0 km | MPC · JPL |
| 346496 | 2008 UW_{75} | — | October 21, 2008 | Kitt Peak | Spacewatch | · | 1.2 km | MPC · JPL |
| 346497 | 2008 UO_{76} | — | October 21, 2008 | Kitt Peak | Spacewatch | · | 1.4 km | MPC · JPL |
| 346498 | 2008 US_{78} | — | October 22, 2008 | Kitt Peak | Spacewatch | · | 1.9 km | MPC · JPL |
| 346499 | 2008 UF_{86} | — | October 23, 2008 | Kitt Peak | Spacewatch | · | 1.8 km | MPC · JPL |
| 346500 | 2008 UV_{86} | — | October 23, 2008 | Mount Lemmon | Mount Lemmon Survey | · | 990 m | MPC · JPL |

== 346501–346600 ==
back to top

| Designation | | | Discovery | | | Properties | | Ref |
| Permanent | Provisional | Named after | Date | Site | Discoverer(s) | Category | Diam. | Ref |
|---|---|---|---|---|---|---|---|---|
| 346501 | 2008 UL_{94} | — | October 26, 2008 | Socorro | LINEAR | · | 1.8 km | MPC · JPL |
| 346502 | 2008 UH_{95} | — | October 28, 2008 | Great Shefford | Birtwhistle, P. | · | 1.5 km | MPC · JPL |
| 346503 | 2008 UO_{102} | — | March 24, 2006 | Mount Lemmon | Mount Lemmon Survey | · | 1.2 km | MPC · JPL |
| 346504 | 2008 UT_{105} | — | October 21, 2008 | Kitt Peak | Spacewatch | · | 950 m | MPC · JPL |
| 346505 | 2008 UC_{125} | — | October 22, 2008 | Kitt Peak | Spacewatch | · | 970 m | MPC · JPL |
| 346506 | 2008 UR_{126} | — | October 22, 2008 | Kitt Peak | Spacewatch | EOS | 2.5 km | MPC · JPL |
| 346507 | 2008 UZ_{127} | — | October 22, 2008 | Kitt Peak | Spacewatch | · | 2.3 km | MPC · JPL |
| 346508 | 2008 UA_{131} | — | October 23, 2008 | Kitt Peak | Spacewatch | · | 1.6 km | MPC · JPL |
| 346509 | 2008 UZ_{131} | — | October 23, 2008 | Kitt Peak | Spacewatch | · | 1.5 km | MPC · JPL |
| 346510 | 2008 UJ_{132} | — | October 23, 2008 | Kitt Peak | Spacewatch | MAS | 820 m | MPC · JPL |
| 346511 | 2008 UK_{136} | — | October 23, 2008 | Kitt Peak | Spacewatch | · | 950 m | MPC · JPL |
| 346512 | 2008 UM_{142} | — | October 23, 2008 | Kitt Peak | Spacewatch | · | 1.2 km | MPC · JPL |
| 346513 | 2008 UL_{143} | — | October 23, 2008 | Kitt Peak | Spacewatch | · | 1.2 km | MPC · JPL |
| 346514 | 2008 UD_{149} | — | October 23, 2008 | Kitt Peak | Spacewatch | · | 1.5 km | MPC · JPL |
| 346515 | 2008 UM_{157} | — | October 23, 2008 | Kitt Peak | Spacewatch | · | 1.8 km | MPC · JPL |
| 346516 | 2008 UR_{158} | — | October 23, 2008 | Kitt Peak | Spacewatch | · | 1.9 km | MPC · JPL |
| 346517 | 2008 UQ_{160} | — | October 23, 2008 | Kitt Peak | Spacewatch | · | 1.2 km | MPC · JPL |
| 346518 | 2008 US_{162} | — | October 24, 2008 | Kitt Peak | Spacewatch | · | 2.4 km | MPC · JPL |
| 346519 | 2008 UT_{166} | — | October 24, 2008 | Kitt Peak | Spacewatch | · | 1.5 km | MPC · JPL |
| 346520 | 2008 UC_{169} | — | October 24, 2008 | Kitt Peak | Spacewatch | · | 1.5 km | MPC · JPL |
| 346521 | 2008 UP_{181} | — | October 24, 2008 | Mount Lemmon | Mount Lemmon Survey | · | 1.4 km | MPC · JPL |
| 346522 | 2008 UA_{185} | — | October 24, 2008 | Kitt Peak | Spacewatch | EOS | 2.2 km | MPC · JPL |
| 346523 | 2008 UM_{185} | — | October 24, 2008 | Kitt Peak | Spacewatch | · | 1.5 km | MPC · JPL |
| 346524 | 2008 UB_{186} | — | October 24, 2008 | Mount Lemmon | Mount Lemmon Survey | NYS | 990 m | MPC · JPL |
| 346525 | 2008 UR_{186} | — | October 24, 2008 | Kitt Peak | Spacewatch | · | 2.1 km | MPC · JPL |
| 346526 | 2008 UA_{187} | — | October 24, 2008 | Kitt Peak | Spacewatch | · | 1.6 km | MPC · JPL |
| 346527 | 2008 UV_{196} | — | October 27, 2008 | Mount Lemmon | Mount Lemmon Survey | V | 690 m | MPC · JPL |
| 346528 | 2008 UM_{201} | — | October 28, 2008 | Socorro | LINEAR | PHO | 1.5 km | MPC · JPL |
| 346529 | 2008 UX_{204} | — | October 25, 2008 | Catalina | CSS | V | 1.1 km | MPC · JPL |
| 346530 | 2008 UT_{223} | — | October 25, 2008 | Catalina | CSS | · | 1.5 km | MPC · JPL |
| 346531 | 2008 UM_{225} | — | October 25, 2008 | Kitt Peak | Spacewatch | (5) | 1.6 km | MPC · JPL |
| 346532 | 2008 UH_{228} | — | October 25, 2008 | Kitt Peak | Spacewatch | · | 1.4 km | MPC · JPL |
| 346533 | 2008 UY_{239} | — | October 26, 2008 | Kitt Peak | Spacewatch | · | 1.5 km | MPC · JPL |
| 346534 | 2008 UE_{245} | — | October 26, 2008 | Kitt Peak | Spacewatch | EUN | 1.5 km | MPC · JPL |
| 346535 | 2008 UW_{247} | — | October 26, 2008 | Kitt Peak | Spacewatch | · | 1.3 km | MPC · JPL |
| 346536 | 2008 UO_{260} | — | October 27, 2008 | Mount Lemmon | Mount Lemmon Survey | · | 1.0 km | MPC · JPL |
| 346537 | 2008 UD_{271} | — | September 21, 2008 | Mount Lemmon | Mount Lemmon Survey | · | 2.3 km | MPC · JPL |
| 346538 | 2008 UJ_{273} | — | November 17, 2004 | Campo Imperatore | CINEOS | · | 2.1 km | MPC · JPL |
| 346539 | 2008 UR_{277} | — | October 28, 2008 | Mount Lemmon | Mount Lemmon Survey | · | 1.5 km | MPC · JPL |
| 346540 | 2008 UK_{282} | — | October 28, 2008 | Kitt Peak | Spacewatch | · | 1.9 km | MPC · JPL |
| 346541 | 2008 UW_{284} | — | October 28, 2008 | Mount Lemmon | Mount Lemmon Survey | · | 1.0 km | MPC · JPL |
| 346542 | 2008 UP_{288} | — | October 28, 2008 | Mount Lemmon | Mount Lemmon Survey | · | 1.0 km | MPC · JPL |
| 346543 | 2008 UX_{289} | — | October 28, 2008 | Kitt Peak | Spacewatch | · | 1.9 km | MPC · JPL |
| 346544 | 2008 UE_{300} | — | October 29, 2008 | Kitt Peak | Spacewatch | (5) | 1.5 km | MPC · JPL |
| 346545 | 2008 UL_{302} | — | October 29, 2008 | Kitt Peak | Spacewatch | · | 1.8 km | MPC · JPL |
| 346546 | 2008 UM_{303} | — | October 29, 2008 | Kitt Peak | Spacewatch | · | 1.7 km | MPC · JPL |
| 346547 | 2008 UB_{304} | — | October 29, 2008 | Mount Lemmon | Mount Lemmon Survey | · | 1.2 km | MPC · JPL |
| 346548 | 2008 UQ_{304} | — | October 29, 2008 | Kitt Peak | Spacewatch | · | 1.3 km | MPC · JPL |
| 346549 | 2008 UV_{314} | — | October 30, 2008 | Mount Lemmon | Mount Lemmon Survey | · | 3.4 km | MPC · JPL |
| 346550 | 2008 UQ_{324} | — | October 31, 2008 | Kitt Peak | Spacewatch | · | 1.7 km | MPC · JPL |
| 346551 | 2008 UJ_{325} | — | October 31, 2008 | Kitt Peak | Spacewatch | · | 1.5 km | MPC · JPL |
| 346552 | 2008 UA_{327} | — | October 31, 2008 | Mount Lemmon | Mount Lemmon Survey | · | 2.3 km | MPC · JPL |
| 346553 | 2008 UL_{328} | — | October 24, 2008 | Catalina | CSS | · | 1.0 km | MPC · JPL |
| 346554 | 2008 UK_{338} | — | October 21, 2008 | Kitt Peak | Spacewatch | · | 2.0 km | MPC · JPL |
| 346555 | 2008 UV_{340} | — | October 24, 2008 | Kitt Peak | Spacewatch | · | 1.8 km | MPC · JPL |
| 346556 | 2008 UW_{340} | — | October 24, 2008 | Catalina | CSS | EUN | 1.6 km | MPC · JPL |
| 346557 | 2008 UM_{346} | — | October 31, 2008 | Mount Lemmon | Mount Lemmon Survey | · | 1.4 km | MPC · JPL |
| 346558 | 2008 UZ_{353} | — | October 21, 2008 | Mount Lemmon | Mount Lemmon Survey | · | 1.7 km | MPC · JPL |
| 346559 | 2008 UM_{354} | — | October 27, 2008 | Mount Lemmon | Mount Lemmon Survey | KOR | 1.8 km | MPC · JPL |
| 346560 | 2008 UP_{355} | — | October 25, 2008 | Mount Lemmon | Mount Lemmon Survey | · | 1.3 km | MPC · JPL |
| 346561 | 2008 UH_{357} | — | October 24, 2008 | Kitt Peak | Spacewatch | · | 900 m | MPC · JPL |
| 346562 | 2008 UX_{365} | — | October 24, 2008 | Catalina | CSS | · | 1.6 km | MPC · JPL |
| 346563 | 2008 UO_{368} | — | October 24, 2008 | Mount Lemmon | Mount Lemmon Survey | ADE | 3.4 km | MPC · JPL |
| 346564 | 2008 UY_{368} | — | October 26, 2008 | Mount Lemmon | Mount Lemmon Survey | · | 2.4 km | MPC · JPL |
| 346565 | 2008 VF_{1} | — | November 1, 2008 | Socorro | LINEAR | · | 1.1 km | MPC · JPL |
| 346566 | 2008 VF_{9} | — | November 2, 2008 | Mount Lemmon | Mount Lemmon Survey | · | 2.2 km | MPC · JPL |
| 346567 | 2008 VH_{15} | — | July 30, 2008 | Mount Lemmon | Mount Lemmon Survey | · | 1.6 km | MPC · JPL |
| 346568 | 2008 VZ_{17} | — | November 1, 2008 | Kitt Peak | Spacewatch | · | 1.0 km | MPC · JPL |
| 346569 | 2008 VF_{19} | — | November 1, 2008 | Kitt Peak | Spacewatch | · | 920 m | MPC · JPL |
| 346570 | 2008 VB_{23} | — | November 1, 2008 | Mount Lemmon | Mount Lemmon Survey | · | 1.8 km | MPC · JPL |
| 346571 | 2008 VX_{25} | — | November 2, 2008 | Kitt Peak | Spacewatch | · | 980 m | MPC · JPL |
| 346572 | 2008 VT_{34} | — | November 2, 2008 | Mount Lemmon | Mount Lemmon Survey | · | 2.0 km | MPC · JPL |
| 346573 | 2008 VG_{47} | — | November 3, 2008 | Kitt Peak | Spacewatch | · | 1.2 km | MPC · JPL |
| 346574 | 2008 VR_{47} | — | November 3, 2008 | Mount Lemmon | Mount Lemmon Survey | MAR | 1.4 km | MPC · JPL |
| 346575 | 2008 VD_{48} | — | September 29, 2008 | Mount Lemmon | Mount Lemmon Survey | · | 2.0 km | MPC · JPL |
| 346576 | 2008 VJ_{51} | — | September 7, 2008 | Mount Lemmon | Mount Lemmon Survey | · | 1.4 km | MPC · JPL |
| 346577 | 2008 VJ_{57} | — | September 22, 2008 | Mount Lemmon | Mount Lemmon Survey | (5) | 1.5 km | MPC · JPL |
| 346578 | 2008 VK_{59} | — | November 7, 2008 | Catalina | CSS | MAS | 830 m | MPC · JPL |
| 346579 | 2008 VJ_{60} | — | November 7, 2008 | Mount Lemmon | Mount Lemmon Survey | HNS | 1.7 km | MPC · JPL |
| 346580 | 2008 VA_{65} | — | November 1, 2008 | Kitt Peak | Spacewatch | · | 2.3 km | MPC · JPL |
| 346581 | 2008 VQ_{65} | — | November 9, 2008 | Kitt Peak | Spacewatch | · | 1.1 km | MPC · JPL |
| 346582 | 2008 VO_{68} | — | November 2, 2008 | Mount Lemmon | Mount Lemmon Survey | · | 2.4 km | MPC · JPL |
| 346583 | 2008 VP_{68} | — | November 8, 2008 | Mount Lemmon | Mount Lemmon Survey | (13314) | 1.8 km | MPC · JPL |
| 346584 | 2008 VB_{74} | — | November 7, 2008 | Mount Lemmon | Mount Lemmon Survey | · | 1.5 km | MPC · JPL |
| 346585 | 2008 VH_{76} | — | November 1, 2008 | Mount Lemmon | Mount Lemmon Survey | · | 2.0 km | MPC · JPL |
| 346586 | 2008 VU_{76} | — | November 1, 2008 | Kitt Peak | Spacewatch | EUN | 1.3 km | MPC · JPL |
| 346587 | 2008 VG_{78} | — | November 7, 2008 | Mount Lemmon | Mount Lemmon Survey | (5) | 1.5 km | MPC · JPL |
| 346588 | 2008 VM_{78} | — | November 7, 2008 | Mount Lemmon | Mount Lemmon Survey | · | 1.3 km | MPC · JPL |
| 346589 | 2008 VC_{79} | — | November 9, 2008 | Mount Lemmon | Mount Lemmon Survey | · | 1.9 km | MPC · JPL |
| 346590 | 2008 VM_{79} | — | November 7, 2008 | Mount Lemmon | Mount Lemmon Survey | · | 3.3 km | MPC · JPL |
| 346591 | 2008 VW_{79} | — | November 6, 2008 | Socorro | LINEAR | ADE | 3.6 km | MPC · JPL |
| 346592 | 2008 VE_{80} | — | November 2, 2008 | Mount Lemmon | Mount Lemmon Survey | · | 3.6 km | MPC · JPL |
| 346593 | 2008 WJ_{1} | — | November 17, 2008 | Kitt Peak | Spacewatch | · | 1.1 km | MPC · JPL |
| 346594 | 2008 WD_{8} | — | November 17, 2008 | Kitt Peak | Spacewatch | · | 1.3 km | MPC · JPL |
| 346595 | 2008 WH_{8} | — | November 17, 2008 | Kitt Peak | Spacewatch | MAS | 850 m | MPC · JPL |
| 346596 | 2008 WC_{9} | — | November 17, 2008 | Kitt Peak | Spacewatch | · | 1.0 km | MPC · JPL |
| 346597 | 2008 WU_{15} | — | November 17, 2008 | Kitt Peak | Spacewatch | · | 1.4 km | MPC · JPL |
| 346598 | 2008 WZ_{21} | — | November 18, 2008 | La Sagra | OAM | · | 1.2 km | MPC · JPL |
| 346599 | 2008 WW_{24} | — | November 18, 2008 | Catalina | CSS | NEM | 2.8 km | MPC · JPL |
| 346600 | 2008 WX_{24} | — | November 18, 2008 | Catalina | CSS | · | 1.4 km | MPC · JPL |

== 346601–346700 ==
back to top

| Designation | | | Discovery | | | Properties | | Ref |
| Permanent | Provisional | Named after | Date | Site | Discoverer(s) | Category | Diam. | Ref |
|---|---|---|---|---|---|---|---|---|
| 346601 | 2008 WE_{32} | — | November 19, 2008 | Mount Lemmon | Mount Lemmon Survey | · | 1.7 km | MPC · JPL |
| 346602 | 2008 WO_{32} | — | November 1, 2008 | Mount Lemmon | Mount Lemmon Survey | · | 1.5 km | MPC · JPL |
| 346603 | 2008 WH_{35} | — | November 17, 2008 | Kitt Peak | Spacewatch | · | 1.2 km | MPC · JPL |
| 346604 | 2008 WY_{42} | — | November 17, 2008 | Kitt Peak | Spacewatch | · | 1.9 km | MPC · JPL |
| 346605 | 2008 WR_{46} | — | November 17, 2008 | Kitt Peak | Spacewatch | MAR | 1.2 km | MPC · JPL |
| 346606 | 2008 WR_{58} | — | September 30, 2008 | Mount Lemmon | Mount Lemmon Survey | (5) | 1.8 km | MPC · JPL |
| 346607 | 2008 WG_{60} | — | November 21, 2008 | Socorro | LINEAR | · | 1.7 km | MPC · JPL |
| 346608 | 2008 WC_{63} | — | November 20, 2008 | Socorro | LINEAR | EUN | 1.3 km | MPC · JPL |
| 346609 | 2008 WD_{64} | — | November 18, 2008 | Catalina | CSS | · | 1.9 km | MPC · JPL |
| 346610 | 2008 WN_{68} | — | November 18, 2008 | Kitt Peak | Spacewatch | · | 1.4 km | MPC · JPL |
| 346611 | 2008 WD_{73} | — | November 19, 2008 | Mount Lemmon | Mount Lemmon Survey | · | 1.5 km | MPC · JPL |
| 346612 | 2008 WF_{75} | — | November 20, 2008 | Kitt Peak | Spacewatch | (5) | 920 m | MPC · JPL |
| 346613 | 2008 WB_{81} | — | November 20, 2008 | Kitt Peak | Spacewatch | · | 1.6 km | MPC · JPL |
| 346614 | 2008 WG_{84} | — | November 20, 2008 | Kitt Peak | Spacewatch | · | 1.3 km | MPC · JPL |
| 346615 | 2008 WQ_{84} | — | November 20, 2008 | Kitt Peak | Spacewatch | (5) | 1.4 km | MPC · JPL |
| 346616 | 2008 WG_{90} | — | November 22, 2008 | Kitt Peak | Spacewatch | EUN | 1.3 km | MPC · JPL |
| 346617 | 2008 WK_{90} | — | November 22, 2008 | Mount Lemmon | Mount Lemmon Survey | · | 2.3 km | MPC · JPL |
| 346618 | 2008 WH_{92} | — | November 7, 2008 | Charleston | R. Holmes | · | 1.4 km | MPC · JPL |
| 346619 | 2008 WA_{93} | — | November 26, 2008 | La Sagra | OAM | · | 1.4 km | MPC · JPL |
| 346620 | 2008 WE_{95} | — | November 21, 2008 | Cerro Burek | Burek, Cerro | · | 1.6 km | MPC · JPL |
| 346621 | 2008 WM_{95} | — | November 23, 2008 | Socorro | LINEAR | · | 1.7 km | MPC · JPL |
| 346622 | 2008 WS_{99} | — | November 24, 2008 | Mount Lemmon | Mount Lemmon Survey | · | 1.6 km | MPC · JPL |
| 346623 | 2008 WU_{100} | — | November 24, 2008 | Mount Lemmon | Mount Lemmon Survey | · | 1.5 km | MPC · JPL |
| 346624 | 2008 WS_{109} | — | November 30, 2008 | Kitt Peak | Spacewatch | · | 1.4 km | MPC · JPL |
| 346625 | 2008 WK_{112} | — | November 30, 2008 | Kitt Peak | Spacewatch | · | 1.2 km | MPC · JPL |
| 346626 | 2008 WJ_{113} | — | November 30, 2008 | Kitt Peak | Spacewatch | · | 1.4 km | MPC · JPL |
| 346627 | 2008 WC_{124} | — | November 19, 2008 | Mount Lemmon | Mount Lemmon Survey | · | 2.0 km | MPC · JPL |
| 346628 | 2008 WD_{125} | — | November 24, 2008 | Kitt Peak | Spacewatch | NEM | 1.9 km | MPC · JPL |
| 346629 | 2008 WO_{128} | — | November 24, 2008 | Kitt Peak | Spacewatch | · | 1.2 km | MPC · JPL |
| 346630 | 2008 WC_{132} | — | December 9, 2004 | Kitt Peak | Spacewatch | · | 2.3 km | MPC · JPL |
| 346631 | 2008 WK_{133} | — | November 19, 2008 | Kitt Peak | Spacewatch | EUN | 1.4 km | MPC · JPL |
| 346632 | 2008 WX_{135} | — | November 19, 2008 | Kitt Peak | Spacewatch | · | 1.8 km | MPC · JPL |
| 346633 | 2008 WD_{136} | — | November 19, 2004 | Catalina | CSS | NYS | 1.5 km | MPC · JPL |
| 346634 | 2008 WW_{137} | — | November 24, 2008 | Kitt Peak | Spacewatch | · | 1.5 km | MPC · JPL |
| 346635 | 2008 WS_{138} | — | November 19, 2008 | Kitt Peak | Spacewatch | · | 2.5 km | MPC · JPL |
| 346636 | 2008 WW_{139} | — | November 30, 2008 | Kitt Peak | Spacewatch | · | 1.6 km | MPC · JPL |
| 346637 | 2008 WZ_{140} | — | November 19, 2008 | Mount Lemmon | Mount Lemmon Survey | · | 1.8 km | MPC · JPL |
| 346638 | 2008 XH_{3} | — | December 6, 2008 | Bisei SG Center | BATTeRS | · | 1.5 km | MPC · JPL |
| 346639 | 2008 XN_{4} | — | November 21, 2008 | Socorro | LINEAR | (1547) | 2.1 km | MPC · JPL |
| 346640 | 2008 XR_{8} | — | December 1, 2008 | Mount Lemmon | Mount Lemmon Survey | · | 1.7 km | MPC · JPL |
| 346641 | 2008 XD_{12} | — | December 2, 2008 | Mount Lemmon | Mount Lemmon Survey | · | 1.6 km | MPC · JPL |
| 346642 | 2008 XQ_{14} | — | September 24, 2008 | Mount Lemmon | Mount Lemmon Survey | (5) | 1.4 km | MPC · JPL |
| 346643 | 2008 XV_{14} | — | December 1, 2008 | Kitt Peak | Spacewatch | · | 1.6 km | MPC · JPL |
| 346644 | 2008 XC_{22} | — | December 1, 2008 | Mount Lemmon | Mount Lemmon Survey | · | 1.8 km | MPC · JPL |
| 346645 | 2008 XS_{29} | — | December 1, 2008 | Kitt Peak | Spacewatch | · | 3.6 km | MPC · JPL |
| 346646 | 2008 XN_{35} | — | December 2, 2008 | Kitt Peak | Spacewatch | · | 2.9 km | MPC · JPL |
| 346647 | 2008 XD_{40} | — | November 22, 2008 | Kitt Peak | Spacewatch | · | 1.8 km | MPC · JPL |
| 346648 | 2008 XQ_{45} | — | December 4, 2008 | Sandlot | G. Hug | · | 1.3 km | MPC · JPL |
| 346649 | 2008 XU_{49} | — | December 7, 2008 | Mount Lemmon | Mount Lemmon Survey | AGN | 1.3 km | MPC · JPL |
| 346650 | 2008 XR_{51} | — | December 1, 2008 | Kitt Peak | Spacewatch | (5) | 1.4 km | MPC · JPL |
| 346651 | 2008 XO_{54} | — | December 2, 2008 | Socorro | LINEAR | · | 4.1 km | MPC · JPL |
| 346652 | 2008 XA_{55} | — | December 6, 2008 | Socorro | LINEAR | · | 2.2 km | MPC · JPL |
| 346653 | 2008 XC_{55} | — | December 6, 2008 | Kitt Peak | Spacewatch | WIT | 1.4 km | MPC · JPL |
| 346654 | 2008 YT | — | December 19, 2008 | Calar Alto | F. Hormuth | · | 1.7 km | MPC · JPL |
| 346655 | 2008 YD_{1} | — | January 16, 2005 | Socorro | LINEAR | (5) | 1.6 km | MPC · JPL |
| 346656 | 2008 YH_{1} | — | September 28, 2003 | Kitt Peak | Spacewatch | · | 1.7 km | MPC · JPL |
| 346657 | 2008 YW_{2} | — | December 22, 2008 | Mayhill | Lowe, A. | AGN | 1.5 km | MPC · JPL |
| 346658 | 2008 YA_{7} | — | December 23, 2008 | Dauban | Kugel, F. | · | 2.0 km | MPC · JPL |
| 346659 | 2008 YZ_{7} | — | December 22, 2008 | La Sagra | OAM | · | 3.0 km | MPC · JPL |
| 346660 | 2008 YT_{11} | — | December 21, 2008 | Catalina | CSS | · | 1.5 km | MPC · JPL |
| 346661 | 2008 YW_{13} | — | December 20, 2008 | Mount Lemmon | Mount Lemmon Survey | · | 1.2 km | MPC · JPL |
| 346662 | 2008 YG_{14} | — | December 20, 2008 | Lulin | LUSS | · | 2.1 km | MPC · JPL |
| 346663 | 2008 YH_{17} | — | December 21, 2008 | Mount Lemmon | Mount Lemmon Survey | · | 1.8 km | MPC · JPL |
| 346664 | 2008 YN_{18} | — | December 21, 2008 | Kitt Peak | Spacewatch | · | 2.8 km | MPC · JPL |
| 346665 | 2008 YH_{21} | — | December 21, 2008 | Mount Lemmon | Mount Lemmon Survey | · | 3.2 km | MPC · JPL |
| 346666 Knorozov | 2008 YK_{22} | Knorozov | December 21, 2008 | Mount Lemmon | Mount Lemmon Survey | · | 1.7 km | MPC · JPL |
| 346667 | 2008 YS_{25} | — | May 25, 2007 | Mount Lemmon | Mount Lemmon Survey | · | 1.9 km | MPC · JPL |
| 346668 | 2008 YP_{26} | — | December 24, 2008 | Dauban | Kugel, F. | · | 2.5 km | MPC · JPL |
| 346669 | 2008 YE_{27} | — | December 22, 2008 | Socorro | LINEAR | · | 2.1 km | MPC · JPL |
| 346670 | 2008 YF_{27} | — | December 22, 2008 | Socorro | LINEAR | EUN | 1.7 km | MPC · JPL |
| 346671 | 2008 YH_{28} | — | December 29, 2008 | Mayhill | Lowe, A. | · | 1.3 km | MPC · JPL |
| 346672 | 2008 YL_{29} | — | December 27, 2008 | Bisei SG Center | BATTeRS | · | 1.7 km | MPC · JPL |
| 346673 | 2008 YO_{32} | — | December 30, 2008 | Purple Mountain | PMO NEO Survey Program | · | 3.1 km | MPC · JPL |
| 346674 | 2008 YN_{33} | — | December 29, 2008 | Dauban | Kugel, F. | · | 1.6 km | MPC · JPL |
| 346675 | 2008 YM_{34} | — | December 31, 2008 | Bergisch Gladbach | W. Bickel | · | 1.7 km | MPC · JPL |
| 346676 | 2008 YT_{34} | — | December 29, 2008 | Kitt Peak | Spacewatch | NEM | 2.7 km | MPC · JPL |
| 346677 | 2008 YK_{36} | — | December 22, 2008 | Kitt Peak | Spacewatch | · | 1.6 km | MPC · JPL |
| 346678 | 2008 YS_{38} | — | December 29, 2008 | Catalina | CSS | BRA | 2.0 km | MPC · JPL |
| 346679 | 2008 YN_{39} | — | December 29, 2008 | Mount Lemmon | Mount Lemmon Survey | EUN | 1.4 km | MPC · JPL |
| 346680 | 2008 YV_{40} | — | December 30, 2008 | Kitt Peak | Spacewatch | · | 1.8 km | MPC · JPL |
| 346681 | 2008 YG_{50} | — | December 29, 2008 | Mount Lemmon | Mount Lemmon Survey | · | 1.9 km | MPC · JPL |
| 346682 | 2008 YR_{63} | — | December 30, 2008 | Mount Lemmon | Mount Lemmon Survey | AGN | 980 m | MPC · JPL |
| 346683 | 2008 YL_{78} | — | December 30, 2008 | Mount Lemmon | Mount Lemmon Survey | · | 1.7 km | MPC · JPL |
| 346684 | 2008 YU_{78} | — | December 30, 2008 | Mount Lemmon | Mount Lemmon Survey | EOS | 2.3 km | MPC · JPL |
| 346685 | 2008 YF_{82} | — | August 24, 2007 | Kitt Peak | Spacewatch | · | 1.7 km | MPC · JPL |
| 346686 | 2008 YJ_{83} | — | December 31, 2008 | Kitt Peak | Spacewatch | · | 1.5 km | MPC · JPL |
| 346687 | 2008 YY_{84} | — | December 27, 2008 | Bergisch Gladbach | W. Bickel | · | 1.5 km | MPC · JPL |
| 346688 | 2008 YJ_{109} | — | December 29, 2008 | Kitt Peak | Spacewatch | · | 3.1 km | MPC · JPL |
| 346689 | 2008 YT_{110} | — | December 31, 2008 | Kitt Peak | Spacewatch | · | 1.8 km | MPC · JPL |
| 346690 | 2008 YE_{113} | — | December 31, 2008 | Catalina | CSS | · | 3.7 km | MPC · JPL |
| 346691 | 2008 YA_{114} | — | December 29, 2008 | Kitt Peak | Spacewatch | AST | 1.8 km | MPC · JPL |
| 346692 | 2008 YU_{120} | — | December 30, 2008 | Kitt Peak | Spacewatch | · | 2.1 km | MPC · JPL |
| 346693 | 2008 YH_{121} | — | December 30, 2008 | Kitt Peak | Spacewatch | HOF | 3.0 km | MPC · JPL |
| 346694 | 2008 YZ_{121} | — | December 30, 2008 | Mount Lemmon | Mount Lemmon Survey | (5) | 2.1 km | MPC · JPL |
| 346695 | 2008 YC_{123} | — | December 30, 2008 | Kitt Peak | Spacewatch | · | 2.3 km | MPC · JPL |
| 346696 | 2008 YG_{123} | — | December 30, 2008 | Kitt Peak | Spacewatch | · | 2.2 km | MPC · JPL |
| 346697 | 2008 YG_{124} | — | December 30, 2008 | Kitt Peak | Spacewatch | KOR | 1.1 km | MPC · JPL |
| 346698 | 2008 YN_{134} | — | December 30, 2008 | Kitt Peak | Spacewatch | · | 2.7 km | MPC · JPL |
| 346699 | 2008 YO_{138} | — | December 30, 2008 | Kitt Peak | Spacewatch | · | 1.9 km | MPC · JPL |
| 346700 | 2008 YT_{138} | — | December 30, 2008 | Mount Lemmon | Mount Lemmon Survey | · | 2.0 km | MPC · JPL |

== 346701–346800 ==
back to top

| Designation | | | Discovery | | | Properties | | Ref |
| Permanent | Provisional | Named after | Date | Site | Discoverer(s) | Category | Diam. | Ref |
|---|---|---|---|---|---|---|---|---|
| 346701 | 2008 YM_{144} | — | December 30, 2008 | Kitt Peak | Spacewatch | · | 1.9 km | MPC · JPL |
| 346702 | 2008 YB_{151} | — | December 22, 2008 | Mount Lemmon | Mount Lemmon Survey | · | 1.9 km | MPC · JPL |
| 346703 | 2008 YE_{155} | — | December 22, 2008 | Kitt Peak | Spacewatch | · | 2.6 km | MPC · JPL |
| 346704 | 2008 YD_{156} | — | December 29, 2008 | Mount Lemmon | Mount Lemmon Survey | NEM | 2.3 km | MPC · JPL |
| 346705 | 2008 YA_{159} | — | December 30, 2008 | Mount Lemmon | Mount Lemmon Survey | · | 2.3 km | MPC · JPL |
| 346706 | 2008 YO_{159} | — | December 31, 2008 | Kitt Peak | Spacewatch | THM | 2.6 km | MPC · JPL |
| 346707 | 2008 YU_{159} | — | December 22, 2008 | Catalina | CSS | · | 1.9 km | MPC · JPL |
| 346708 | 2008 YT_{162} | — | December 22, 2008 | Kitt Peak | Spacewatch | · | 1.8 km | MPC · JPL |
| 346709 | 2008 YL_{165} | — | December 22, 2008 | Mount Lemmon | Mount Lemmon Survey | · | 1.6 km | MPC · JPL |
| 346710 | 2008 YZ_{166} | — | December 19, 2008 | Socorro | LINEAR | HNS | 1.7 km | MPC · JPL |
| 346711 | 2008 YB_{167} | — | December 20, 2008 | Socorro | LINEAR | · | 2.1 km | MPC · JPL |
| 346712 | 2008 YC_{169} | — | December 22, 2008 | Kitt Peak | Spacewatch | HOF | 3.0 km | MPC · JPL |
| 346713 | 2008 YK_{169} | — | December 29, 2008 | Mount Lemmon | Mount Lemmon Survey | HOF | 7.1 km | MPC · JPL |
| 346714 | 2008 YU_{169} | — | December 31, 2008 | Mount Lemmon | Mount Lemmon Survey | EOS | 2.4 km | MPC · JPL |
| 346715 | 2008 YN_{172} | — | December 29, 2008 | Catalina | CSS | · | 1.6 km | MPC · JPL |
| 346716 | 2009 AW | — | January 2, 2009 | Mayhill | Lowe, A. | · | 1.7 km | MPC · JPL |
| 346717 | 2009 AB_{1} | — | January 1, 2009 | Dauban | Kugel, F. | (5) | 1.3 km | MPC · JPL |
| 346718 | 2009 AL_{6} | — | January 1, 2009 | Kitt Peak | Spacewatch | KOR | 1.2 km | MPC · JPL |
| 346719 | 2009 AO_{12} | — | January 2, 2009 | Mount Lemmon | Mount Lemmon Survey | · | 2.1 km | MPC · JPL |
| 346720 | 2009 AX_{14} | — | January 2, 2009 | Mount Lemmon | Mount Lemmon Survey | · | 2.0 km | MPC · JPL |
| 346721 Panchengdong | 2009 AP_{15} | Panchengdong | January 14, 2009 | Weihai | University, Shandong | · | 1.9 km | MPC · JPL |
| 346722 | 2009 AH_{17} | — | January 1, 2009 | Kitt Peak | Spacewatch | · | 1.5 km | MPC · JPL |
| 346723 | 2009 AJ_{17} | — | January 1, 2009 | Kitt Peak | Spacewatch | · | 1.6 km | MPC · JPL |
| 346724 | 2009 AT_{18} | — | January 2, 2009 | Kitt Peak | Spacewatch | · | 2.6 km | MPC · JPL |
| 346725 | 2009 AU_{21} | — | January 3, 2009 | Kitt Peak | Spacewatch | · | 2.6 km | MPC · JPL |
| 346726 | 2009 AN_{22} | — | September 11, 2007 | Mount Lemmon | Mount Lemmon Survey | · | 2.0 km | MPC · JPL |
| 346727 | 2009 AU_{23} | — | January 3, 2009 | Kitt Peak | Spacewatch | BRA | 1.5 km | MPC · JPL |
| 346728 | 2009 AZ_{25} | — | January 2, 2009 | Kitt Peak | Spacewatch | KOR | 1.1 km | MPC · JPL |
| 346729 | 2009 AK_{26} | — | January 2, 2009 | Kitt Peak | Spacewatch | · | 1.5 km | MPC · JPL |
| 346730 | 2009 AA_{27} | — | January 2, 2009 | Kitt Peak | Spacewatch | KOR | 1.4 km | MPC · JPL |
| 346731 | 2009 AY_{30} | — | January 15, 2009 | Kitt Peak | Spacewatch | KOR | 1.4 km | MPC · JPL |
| 346732 | 2009 AX_{33} | — | January 15, 2009 | Kitt Peak | Spacewatch | · | 2.4 km | MPC · JPL |
| 346733 | 2009 AH_{46} | — | January 8, 2009 | Kitt Peak | Spacewatch | · | 2.4 km | MPC · JPL |
| 346734 | 2009 AM_{49} | — | January 1, 2009 | Kitt Peak | Spacewatch | · | 2.3 km | MPC · JPL |
| 346735 | 2009 AV_{50} | — | January 15, 2009 | Kitt Peak | Spacewatch | · | 2.3 km | MPC · JPL |
| 346736 | 2009 BQ_{3} | — | October 31, 2002 | Palomar | NEAT | · | 2.4 km | MPC · JPL |
| 346737 | 2009 BX_{3} | — | January 18, 2009 | Socorro | LINEAR | · | 3.1 km | MPC · JPL |
| 346738 | 2009 BA_{4} | — | January 18, 2009 | Socorro | LINEAR | · | 2.2 km | MPC · JPL |
| 346739 | 2009 BE_{5} | — | January 17, 2009 | Dauban | Kugel, F. | (194) | 1.7 km | MPC · JPL |
| 346740 | 2009 BX_{5} | — | January 18, 2009 | Sandlot | G. Hug | MIS | 2.6 km | MPC · JPL |
| 346741 | 2009 BP_{7} | — | January 18, 2009 | Socorro | LINEAR | · | 2.6 km | MPC · JPL |
| 346742 | 2009 BL_{8} | — | January 17, 2009 | Socorro | LINEAR | · | 1.4 km | MPC · JPL |
| 346743 | 2009 BJ_{12} | — | January 25, 2009 | Gaisberg | Gierlinger, R. | · | 1.9 km | MPC · JPL |
| 346744 | 2009 BS_{14} | — | January 16, 2009 | Kitt Peak | Spacewatch | · | 1.8 km | MPC · JPL |
| 346745 | 2009 BD_{15} | — | January 16, 2009 | Kitt Peak | Spacewatch | · | 1.4 km | MPC · JPL |
| 346746 | 2009 BG_{16} | — | January 16, 2009 | Mount Lemmon | Mount Lemmon Survey | KOR | 1.2 km | MPC · JPL |
| 346747 | 2009 BX_{16} | — | January 16, 2009 | Kitt Peak | Spacewatch | LIX | 4.7 km | MPC · JPL |
| 346748 | 2009 BF_{17} | — | September 13, 2007 | Mount Lemmon | Mount Lemmon Survey | KOR | 1.1 km | MPC · JPL |
| 346749 | 2009 BX_{18} | — | January 16, 2009 | Mount Lemmon | Mount Lemmon Survey | KOR | 1.5 km | MPC · JPL |
| 346750 | 2009 BM_{23} | — | January 17, 2009 | Kitt Peak | Spacewatch | PAD | 2.1 km | MPC · JPL |
| 346751 | 2009 BR_{27} | — | January 16, 2009 | Kitt Peak | Spacewatch | · | 2.3 km | MPC · JPL |
| 346752 | 2009 BS_{28} | — | January 16, 2009 | Kitt Peak | Spacewatch | AST | 1.6 km | MPC · JPL |
| 346753 | 2009 BX_{31} | — | January 16, 2009 | Kitt Peak | Spacewatch | · | 1.7 km | MPC · JPL |
| 346754 | 2009 BW_{34} | — | January 16, 2009 | Kitt Peak | Spacewatch | · | 1.9 km | MPC · JPL |
| 346755 | 2009 BF_{35} | — | January 16, 2009 | Kitt Peak | Spacewatch | · | 3.4 km | MPC · JPL |
| 346756 | 2009 BX_{37} | — | January 16, 2009 | Kitt Peak | Spacewatch | KOR | 1.4 km | MPC · JPL |
| 346757 | 2009 BD_{41} | — | January 16, 2009 | Kitt Peak | Spacewatch | · | 1.6 km | MPC · JPL |
| 346758 | 2009 BY_{43} | — | January 16, 2009 | Kitt Peak | Spacewatch | · | 1.8 km | MPC · JPL |
| 346759 | 2009 BV_{46} | — | January 16, 2009 | Kitt Peak | Spacewatch | EOS | 2.3 km | MPC · JPL |
| 346760 | 2009 BB_{55} | — | January 16, 2009 | Mount Lemmon | Mount Lemmon Survey | · | 2.2 km | MPC · JPL |
| 346761 | 2009 BH_{57} | — | January 18, 2009 | Kitt Peak | Spacewatch | · | 2.7 km | MPC · JPL |
| 346762 | 2009 BG_{62} | — | January 18, 2009 | Mount Lemmon | Mount Lemmon Survey | fast | 3.0 km | MPC · JPL |
| 346763 | 2009 BZ_{73} | — | January 16, 2009 | Purple Mountain | PMO NEO Survey Program | · | 1.3 km | MPC · JPL |
| 346764 | 2009 BE_{74} | — | January 17, 2009 | Kitt Peak | Spacewatch | · | 2.6 km | MPC · JPL |
| 346765 | 2009 BF_{74} | — | January 17, 2009 | Kitt Peak | Spacewatch | · | 1.8 km | MPC · JPL |
| 346766 | 2009 BN_{74} | — | January 18, 2009 | Catalina | CSS | GAL | 2.1 km | MPC · JPL |
| 346767 | 2009 BS_{74} | — | January 18, 2009 | Purple Mountain | PMO NEO Survey Program | WIT | 1.0 km | MPC · JPL |
| 346768 | 2009 BQ_{79} | — | January 30, 2009 | Socorro | LINEAR | · | 2.5 km | MPC · JPL |
| 346769 | 2009 BY_{84} | — | January 1, 2009 | Kitt Peak | Spacewatch | · | 2.9 km | MPC · JPL |
| 346770 | 2009 BE_{85} | — | December 22, 2008 | Kitt Peak | Spacewatch | · | 2.2 km | MPC · JPL |
| 346771 | 2009 BH_{85} | — | January 25, 2009 | Kitt Peak | Spacewatch | · | 1.6 km | MPC · JPL |
| 346772 | 2009 BR_{86} | — | January 25, 2009 | Kitt Peak | Spacewatch | · | 2.1 km | MPC · JPL |
| 346773 | 2009 BP_{93} | — | January 25, 2009 | Kitt Peak | Spacewatch | AGN | 1.3 km | MPC · JPL |
| 346774 | 2009 BS_{95} | — | January 26, 2009 | Mount Lemmon | Mount Lemmon Survey | KOR | 1.4 km | MPC · JPL |
| 346775 | 2009 BT_{95} | — | January 26, 2009 | Mount Lemmon | Mount Lemmon Survey | · | 1.6 km | MPC · JPL |
| 346776 | 2009 BX_{99} | — | January 28, 2009 | Catalina | CSS | · | 2.0 km | MPC · JPL |
| 346777 | 2009 BL_{111} | — | January 28, 2009 | Catalina | CSS | AEO | 1.3 km | MPC · JPL |
| 346778 | 2009 BP_{113} | — | January 26, 2009 | Kitt Peak | Spacewatch | · | 4.7 km | MPC · JPL |
| 346779 | 2009 BU_{114} | — | January 26, 2009 | Kitt Peak | Spacewatch | · | 2.1 km | MPC · JPL |
| 346780 | 2009 BY_{120} | — | January 31, 2009 | Kitt Peak | Spacewatch | EOS | 2.6 km | MPC · JPL |
| 346781 | 2009 BW_{122} | — | January 31, 2009 | Kitt Peak | Spacewatch | · | 1.5 km | MPC · JPL |
| 346782 | 2009 BC_{123} | — | January 20, 2009 | Kitt Peak | Spacewatch | · | 2.8 km | MPC · JPL |
| 346783 | 2009 BU_{128} | — | January 29, 2009 | Mount Lemmon | Mount Lemmon Survey | · | 2.3 km | MPC · JPL |
| 346784 | 2009 BQ_{130} | — | January 31, 2009 | Mount Lemmon | Mount Lemmon Survey | EOS | 2.0 km | MPC · JPL |
| 346785 | 2009 BX_{132} | — | January 31, 2009 | Kitt Peak | Spacewatch | · | 2.6 km | MPC · JPL |
| 346786 | 2009 BQ_{138} | — | January 29, 2009 | Kitt Peak | Spacewatch | · | 2.9 km | MPC · JPL |
| 346787 | 2009 BV_{141} | — | January 30, 2009 | Kitt Peak | Spacewatch | KOR | 1.7 km | MPC · JPL |
| 346788 | 2009 BZ_{144} | — | January 30, 2009 | Kitt Peak | Spacewatch | EOS | 2.6 km | MPC · JPL |
| 346789 | 2009 BC_{145} | — | January 30, 2009 | Kitt Peak | Spacewatch | · | 1.9 km | MPC · JPL |
| 346790 | 2009 BJ_{146} | — | January 30, 2009 | Mount Lemmon | Mount Lemmon Survey | EOS | 1.9 km | MPC · JPL |
| 346791 | 2009 BV_{149} | — | January 31, 2009 | Kitt Peak | Spacewatch | · | 1.8 km | MPC · JPL |
| 346792 | 2009 BG_{153} | — | January 31, 2009 | Kitt Peak | Spacewatch | AST | 1.7 km | MPC · JPL |
| 346793 | 2009 BF_{155} | — | January 31, 2009 | Kitt Peak | Spacewatch | · | 1.3 km | MPC · JPL |
| 346794 | 2009 BC_{157} | — | January 31, 2009 | Kitt Peak | Spacewatch | · | 1.9 km | MPC · JPL |
| 346795 | 2009 BV_{157} | — | January 31, 2009 | Kitt Peak | Spacewatch | · | 2.4 km | MPC · JPL |
| 346796 | 2009 BX_{158} | — | January 31, 2009 | Kitt Peak | Spacewatch | VER | 2.6 km | MPC · JPL |
| 346797 | 2009 BJ_{173} | — | January 20, 2009 | Kitt Peak | Spacewatch | AST | 1.8 km | MPC · JPL |
| 346798 | 2009 BM_{174} | — | January 25, 2009 | Kitt Peak | Spacewatch | CYB | 4.7 km | MPC · JPL |
| 346799 | 2009 BQ_{174} | — | January 25, 2009 | Kitt Peak | Spacewatch | · | 2.1 km | MPC · JPL |
| 346800 | 2009 BE_{175} | — | January 26, 2009 | Purple Mountain | PMO NEO Survey Program | EOS | 2.4 km | MPC · JPL |

== 346801–346900 ==
back to top

| Designation | | | Discovery | | | Properties | | Ref |
| Permanent | Provisional | Named after | Date | Site | Discoverer(s) | Category | Diam. | Ref |
|---|---|---|---|---|---|---|---|---|
| 346801 | 2009 BP_{176} | — | January 31, 2009 | Kitt Peak | Spacewatch | · | 2.5 km | MPC · JPL |
| 346802 | 2009 BZ_{177} | — | January 31, 2009 | Mount Lemmon | Mount Lemmon Survey | · | 2.0 km | MPC · JPL |
| 346803 | 2009 BK_{181} | — | January 18, 2009 | Catalina | CSS | · | 2.5 km | MPC · JPL |
| 346804 | 2009 BF_{183} | — | January 25, 2009 | Catalina | CSS | · | 2.4 km | MPC · JPL |
| 346805 | 2009 CH_{2} | — | February 2, 2009 | Moletai | K. Černis, Zdanavicius, J. | · | 1.9 km | MPC · JPL |
| 346806 | 2009 CL_{15} | — | February 3, 2009 | Kitt Peak | Spacewatch | HYG | 3.0 km | MPC · JPL |
| 346807 | 2009 CZ_{19} | — | February 15, 2009 | Calar Alto | F. Hormuth | · | 3.2 km | MPC · JPL |
| 346808 | 2009 CK_{30} | — | February 1, 2009 | Kitt Peak | Spacewatch | · | 1.7 km | MPC · JPL |
| 346809 | 2009 CD_{35} | — | February 2, 2009 | Mount Lemmon | Mount Lemmon Survey | EOS | 1.9 km | MPC · JPL |
| 346810 Giancabattisti | 2009 CD_{40} | Giancabattisti | February 13, 2009 | Vallemare Borbona | V. S. Casulli | GEF | 1.6 km | MPC · JPL |
| 346811 | 2009 CF_{40} | — | February 14, 2009 | Catalina | CSS | · | 2.3 km | MPC · JPL |
| 346812 | 2009 CK_{40} | — | February 13, 2009 | Kitt Peak | Spacewatch | · | 2.7 km | MPC · JPL |
| 346813 | 2009 CN_{40} | — | February 13, 2009 | Kitt Peak | Spacewatch | HOF | 2.6 km | MPC · JPL |
| 346814 | 2009 CG_{49} | — | February 14, 2009 | Mount Lemmon | Mount Lemmon Survey | AGN | 1.5 km | MPC · JPL |
| 346815 | 2009 CE_{50} | — | February 14, 2009 | La Sagra | OAM | (5) | 1.5 km | MPC · JPL |
| 346816 | 2009 CV_{51} | — | February 14, 2009 | Mount Lemmon | Mount Lemmon Survey | · | 1.8 km | MPC · JPL |
| 346817 | 2009 CG_{53} | — | February 15, 2009 | Catalina | CSS | · | 3.6 km | MPC · JPL |
| 346818 | 2009 CO_{57} | — | February 2, 2009 | Kitt Peak | Spacewatch | KOR | 1.3 km | MPC · JPL |
| 346819 | 2009 CQ_{57} | — | February 2, 2009 | Kitt Peak | Spacewatch | · | 2.1 km | MPC · JPL |
| 346820 | 2009 CA_{59} | — | February 5, 2009 | Kitt Peak | Spacewatch | (1298) | 3.5 km | MPC · JPL |
| 346821 | 2009 CD_{60} | — | May 26, 2006 | Mount Lemmon | Mount Lemmon Survey | · | 2.5 km | MPC · JPL |
| 346822 | 2009 CO_{62} | — | February 5, 2009 | Kitt Peak | Spacewatch | THM | 2.2 km | MPC · JPL |
| 346823 | 2009 CD_{64} | — | February 2, 2009 | Kitt Peak | Spacewatch | · | 3.2 km | MPC · JPL |
| 346824 | 2009 CZ_{64} | — | February 3, 2009 | Mount Lemmon | Mount Lemmon Survey | EOS | 2.0 km | MPC · JPL |
| 346825 | 2009 CM_{65} | — | February 5, 2009 | Kitt Peak | Spacewatch | · | 2.8 km | MPC · JPL |
| 346826 | 2009 DT_{1} | — | February 16, 2009 | Dauban | Kugel, F. | · | 3.2 km | MPC · JPL |
| 346827 | 2009 DL_{3} | — | February 19, 2009 | Sierra Stars | Tozzi, F. | · | 1.9 km | MPC · JPL |
| 346828 | 2009 DW_{3} | — | February 18, 2009 | Socorro | LINEAR | · | 2.8 km | MPC · JPL |
| 346829 | 2009 DT_{4} | — | February 19, 2009 | Mayhill | Lowe, A. | · | 4.0 km | MPC · JPL |
| 346830 | 2009 DY_{9} | — | February 19, 2009 | Socorro | LINEAR | · | 2.6 km | MPC · JPL |
| 346831 | 2009 DE_{12} | — | February 21, 2009 | Cordell-Lorenz | D. T. Durig | · | 2.7 km | MPC · JPL |
| 346832 | 2009 DS_{12} | — | February 16, 2009 | Kitt Peak | Spacewatch | · | 4.2 km | MPC · JPL |
| 346833 | 2009 DT_{15} | — | February 16, 2009 | La Sagra | OAM | · | 1.3 km | MPC · JPL |
| 346834 | 2009 DM_{16} | — | February 17, 2009 | La Sagra | OAM | KOR | 1.7 km | MPC · JPL |
| 346835 | 2009 DH_{27} | — | February 22, 2009 | Calar Alto | F. Hormuth | VER | 3.1 km | MPC · JPL |
| 346836 | 2009 DQ_{35} | — | February 20, 2009 | Kitt Peak | Spacewatch | · | 3.2 km | MPC · JPL |
| 346837 | 2009 DD_{44} | — | February 24, 2009 | Dauban | Kugel, F. | · | 3.4 km | MPC · JPL |
| 346838 | 2009 DB_{50} | — | February 19, 2009 | Kitt Peak | Spacewatch | · | 3.3 km | MPC · JPL |
| 346839 | 2009 DW_{51} | — | February 22, 2009 | Kitt Peak | Spacewatch | · | 2.5 km | MPC · JPL |
| 346840 | 2009 DM_{57} | — | February 22, 2009 | Kitt Peak | Spacewatch | EOS | 2.1 km | MPC · JPL |
| 346841 | 2009 DD_{77} | — | February 21, 2009 | Mount Lemmon | Mount Lemmon Survey | · | 2.4 km | MPC · JPL |
| 346842 | 2009 DW_{88} | — | February 22, 2009 | Mount Lemmon | Mount Lemmon Survey | · | 1.4 km | MPC · JPL |
| 346843 | 2009 DZ_{92} | — | February 28, 2009 | Mount Lemmon | Mount Lemmon Survey | · | 4.2 km | MPC · JPL |
| 346844 | 2009 DP_{95} | — | February 25, 2009 | Catalina | CSS | EOS | 2.4 km | MPC · JPL |
| 346845 | 2009 DA_{96} | — | February 25, 2009 | Catalina | CSS | · | 3.8 km | MPC · JPL |
| 346846 | 2009 DB_{110} | — | January 30, 2009 | Siding Spring | SSS | · | 2.6 km | MPC · JPL |
| 346847 | 2009 DC_{115} | — | February 26, 2009 | Catalina | CSS | · | 1.8 km | MPC · JPL |
| 346848 | 2009 DS_{116} | — | February 27, 2009 | Kitt Peak | Spacewatch | · | 3.4 km | MPC · JPL |
| 346849 | 2009 DU_{116} | — | February 26, 2004 | Kitt Peak | Deep Ecliptic Survey | · | 1.5 km | MPC · JPL |
| 346850 | 2009 DY_{119} | — | August 28, 2006 | Catalina | CSS | · | 3.1 km | MPC · JPL |
| 346851 | 2009 DO_{122} | — | February 27, 2009 | Kitt Peak | Spacewatch | · | 2.5 km | MPC · JPL |
| 346852 | 2009 DD_{124} | — | February 19, 2009 | Kitt Peak | Spacewatch | KOR | 1.4 km | MPC · JPL |
| 346853 | 2009 DU_{128} | — | February 24, 2009 | Catalina | CSS | · | 3.9 km | MPC · JPL |
| 346854 | 2009 DW_{132} | — | February 26, 2009 | Mount Lemmon | Mount Lemmon Survey | · | 1.8 km | MPC · JPL |
| 346855 | 2009 EJ | — | March 1, 2009 | Great Shefford | Birtwhistle, P. | THM | 2.6 km | MPC · JPL |
| 346856 | 2009 EZ_{14} | — | March 15, 2009 | Kitt Peak | Spacewatch | · | 2.9 km | MPC · JPL |
| 346857 | 2009 EF_{16} | — | March 15, 2009 | Kitt Peak | Spacewatch | · | 3.3 km | MPC · JPL |
| 346858 | 2009 EN_{19} | — | March 15, 2009 | Mount Lemmon | Mount Lemmon Survey | THM | 2.4 km | MPC · JPL |
| 346859 | 2009 ET_{21} | — | March 14, 2009 | La Sagra | OAM | · | 2.6 km | MPC · JPL |
| 346860 | 2009 EF_{23} | — | March 7, 2009 | Mount Lemmon | Mount Lemmon Survey | · | 3.1 km | MPC · JPL |
| 346861 | 2009 EQ_{23} | — | March 3, 2009 | Catalina | CSS | URS | 6.1 km | MPC · JPL |
| 346862 | 2009 EY_{26} | — | March 8, 2009 | Mount Lemmon | Mount Lemmon Survey | · | 3.1 km | MPC · JPL |
| 346863 | 2009 EA_{30} | — | March 1, 2009 | Mount Lemmon | Mount Lemmon Survey | · | 3.0 km | MPC · JPL |
| 346864 | 2009 EP_{30} | — | March 7, 2009 | Mount Lemmon | Mount Lemmon Survey | EOS | 2.3 km | MPC · JPL |
| 346865 | 2009 FJ_{3} | — | March 17, 2009 | Taunus | E. Schwab, Zimmer, U. | TEL | 1.5 km | MPC · JPL |
| 346866 | 2009 FX_{14} | — | November 11, 2001 | Apache Point | SDSS | · | 3.7 km | MPC · JPL |
| 346867 | 2009 FZ_{15} | — | March 17, 2009 | Kitt Peak | Spacewatch | · | 3.0 km | MPC · JPL |
| 346868 | 2009 FC_{19} | — | March 20, 2009 | La Cañada | Lacruz, J. | · | 2.0 km | MPC · JPL |
| 346869 | 2009 FT_{24} | — | March 21, 2009 | La Sagra | OAM | · | 3.5 km | MPC · JPL |
| 346870 | 2009 FW_{24} | — | February 24, 2009 | Catalina | CSS | · | 2.9 km | MPC · JPL |
| 346871 | 2009 FB_{26} | — | March 16, 2009 | Mount Lemmon | Mount Lemmon Survey | · | 3.0 km | MPC · JPL |
| 346872 | 2009 FW_{46} | — | March 27, 2009 | Kitt Peak | Spacewatch | THM | 2.4 km | MPC · JPL |
| 346873 | 2009 FN_{47} | — | March 28, 2009 | Mount Lemmon | Mount Lemmon Survey | · | 3.2 km | MPC · JPL |
| 346874 | 2009 FR_{49} | — | March 27, 2009 | Mount Lemmon | Mount Lemmon Survey | HYG | 3.0 km | MPC · JPL |
| 346875 | 2009 FD_{50} | — | March 27, 2009 | Catalina | CSS | URS | 3.8 km | MPC · JPL |
| 346876 | 2009 FY_{60} | — | March 21, 2009 | Mount Lemmon | Mount Lemmon Survey | · | 1.3 km | MPC · JPL |
| 346877 | 2009 FG_{64} | — | March 31, 2009 | Kitt Peak | Spacewatch | · | 2.7 km | MPC · JPL |
| 346878 | 2009 FD_{65} | — | March 18, 2009 | Mount Lemmon | Mount Lemmon Survey | THM | 2.4 km | MPC · JPL |
| 346879 | 2009 HM_{26} | — | April 18, 2009 | Kitt Peak | Spacewatch | · | 2.6 km | MPC · JPL |
| 346880 | 2009 HM_{29} | — | April 19, 2009 | Kitt Peak | Spacewatch | JUN | 1.4 km | MPC · JPL |
| 346881 | 2009 HP_{29} | — | April 19, 2009 | Kitt Peak | Spacewatch | · | 1.8 km | MPC · JPL |
| 346882 | 2009 HV_{29} | — | April 19, 2009 | Kitt Peak | Spacewatch | EOS | 2.4 km | MPC · JPL |
| 346883 | 2009 JH_{4} | — | May 1, 2009 | Cerro Burek | I. de la Cueva | L5 | 10 km | MPC · JPL |
| 346884 | 2009 JX_{12} | — | May 15, 2009 | La Sagra | OAM | CYB | 6.2 km | MPC · JPL |
| 346885 | 2009 JN_{17} | — | May 14, 2009 | Mount Lemmon | Mount Lemmon Survey | L5 | 14 km | MPC · JPL |
| 346886 Middelburg | 2009 MB | Middelburg | November 15, 1999 | Uccle | E. W. Elst | H | 530 m | MPC · JPL |
| 346887 | 2009 OU_{23} | — | July 28, 2009 | Kitt Peak | Spacewatch | · | 4.0 km | MPC · JPL |
| 346888 | 2009 PB_{10} | — | August 15, 2009 | La Sagra | OAM | H | 690 m | MPC · JPL |
| 346889 Rhiphonos | 2009 QV_{38} | Rhiphonos | August 28, 2009 | Zelenchukskaya Stn | T. V. Krjačko | T_{j} (2.91) · centaur | 23 km | MPC · JPL |
| 346890 | 2009 RP_{30} | — | September 14, 2009 | Kitt Peak | Spacewatch | · | 930 m | MPC · JPL |
| 346891 | 2009 RO_{39} | — | September 15, 2009 | Kitt Peak | Spacewatch | · | 780 m | MPC · JPL |
| 346892 | 2009 RY_{42} | — | September 15, 2009 | Kitt Peak | Spacewatch | · | 640 m | MPC · JPL |
| 346893 | 2009 RT_{43} | — | September 15, 2009 | Kitt Peak | Spacewatch | · | 720 m | MPC · JPL |
| 346894 | 2009 RG_{54} | — | September 15, 2009 | Kitt Peak | Spacewatch | · | 650 m | MPC · JPL |
| 346895 | 2009 SN_{38} | — | September 16, 2009 | Kitt Peak | Spacewatch | · | 920 m | MPC · JPL |
| 346896 | 2009 SL_{98} | — | September 17, 2009 | Moletai | K. Černis, Zdanavicius, J. | · | 790 m | MPC · JPL |
| 346897 | 2009 SJ_{104} | — | September 26, 2009 | Catalina | CSS | H | 650 m | MPC · JPL |
| 346898 | 2009 SC_{126} | — | September 18, 2009 | Kitt Peak | Spacewatch | · | 850 m | MPC · JPL |
| 346899 | 2009 ST_{360} | — | September 17, 2009 | Kitt Peak | Spacewatch | · | 2.1 km | MPC · JPL |
| 346900 | 2009 TD_{38} | — | October 14, 2009 | Catalina | CSS | V | 780 m | MPC · JPL |

== 346901–347000 ==
back to top

| Designation | | | Discovery | | | Properties | | Ref |
| Permanent | Provisional | Named after | Date | Site | Discoverer(s) | Category | Diam. | Ref |
|---|---|---|---|---|---|---|---|---|
| 346901 | 2009 TH_{44} | — | October 14, 2009 | Kitt Peak | Spacewatch | · | 610 m | MPC · JPL |
| 346902 | 2009 UJ_{1} | — | October 18, 2009 | Catalina | CSS | H | 760 m | MPC · JPL |
| 346903 | 2009 UG_{13} | — | October 18, 2009 | Kitt Peak | Spacewatch | H | 650 m | MPC · JPL |
| 346904 | 2009 UR_{88} | — | October 22, 2009 | Catalina | CSS | · | 1.6 km | MPC · JPL |
| 346905 | 2009 UY_{144} | — | October 16, 2009 | Catalina | CSS | H | 680 m | MPC · JPL |
| 346906 | 2009 VD_{21} | — | November 9, 2009 | Mount Lemmon | Mount Lemmon Survey | V | 780 m | MPC · JPL |
| 346907 | 2009 VH_{48} | — | April 1, 2008 | Kitt Peak | Spacewatch | · | 760 m | MPC · JPL |
| 346908 | 2009 VW_{79} | — | November 10, 2009 | Catalina | CSS | · | 1.6 km | MPC · JPL |
| 346909 | 2009 WR_{41} | — | November 17, 2009 | Kitt Peak | Spacewatch | · | 670 m | MPC · JPL |
| 346910 | 2009 WW_{50} | — | November 20, 2009 | Kitt Peak | Spacewatch | · | 750 m | MPC · JPL |
| 346911 | 2009 WF_{76} | — | November 10, 2009 | Kitt Peak | Spacewatch | · | 750 m | MPC · JPL |
| 346912 | 2009 WR_{83} | — | November 19, 2009 | Kitt Peak | Spacewatch | · | 1.0 km | MPC · JPL |
| 346913 | 2009 WQ_{87} | — | April 24, 2001 | Kitt Peak | Spacewatch | · | 1.0 km | MPC · JPL |
| 346914 | 2009 WR_{94} | — | November 20, 2009 | Mount Lemmon | Mount Lemmon Survey | · | 900 m | MPC · JPL |
| 346915 | 2009 WY_{125} | — | November 20, 2009 | Kitt Peak | Spacewatch | · | 800 m | MPC · JPL |
| 346916 | 2009 WD_{204} | — | November 16, 2009 | Kitt Peak | Spacewatch | V | 670 m | MPC · JPL |
| 346917 | 2009 WO_{262} | — | November 20, 2009 | Mount Lemmon | Mount Lemmon Survey | NYS | 900 m | MPC · JPL |
| 346918 | 2009 XF_{18} | — | December 15, 2009 | Mount Lemmon | Mount Lemmon Survey | · | 950 m | MPC · JPL |
| 346919 | 2009 XO_{20} | — | October 22, 2005 | Catalina | CSS | · | 1.1 km | MPC · JPL |
| 346920 | 2009 XL_{21} | — | December 10, 2009 | Mount Lemmon | Mount Lemmon Survey | · | 760 m | MPC · JPL |
| 346921 | 2009 XM_{21} | — | December 10, 2009 | Mount Lemmon | Mount Lemmon Survey | HOF | 2.8 km | MPC · JPL |
| 346922 | 2009 YV_{4} | — | December 17, 2009 | Mount Lemmon | Mount Lemmon Survey | · | 890 m | MPC · JPL |
| 346923 | 2009 YT_{20} | — | December 27, 2009 | Kitt Peak | Spacewatch | · | 1.5 km | MPC · JPL |
| 346924 | 2009 YR_{22} | — | December 18, 2009 | Mount Lemmon | Mount Lemmon Survey | · | 630 m | MPC · JPL |
| 346925 | 2009 YH_{25} | — | December 27, 2009 | Kitt Peak | Spacewatch | · | 1.7 km | MPC · JPL |
| 346926 | 2010 AS_{2} | — | January 7, 2010 | Bisei SG Center | BATTeRS | · | 720 m | MPC · JPL |
| 346927 | 2010 AG_{28} | — | January 7, 2010 | Mount Lemmon | Mount Lemmon Survey | · | 930 m | MPC · JPL |
| 346928 | 2010 AX_{30} | — | January 6, 2010 | Kitt Peak | Spacewatch | · | 1.3 km | MPC · JPL |
| 346929 | 2010 AN_{31} | — | January 6, 2010 | Kitt Peak | Spacewatch | · | 2.0 km | MPC · JPL |
| 346930 | 2010 AA_{35} | — | January 7, 2010 | Kitt Peak | Spacewatch | · | 710 m | MPC · JPL |
| 346931 | 2010 AR_{35} | — | January 7, 2010 | Kitt Peak | Spacewatch | · | 1.3 km | MPC · JPL |
| 346932 | 2010 AH_{36} | — | December 18, 2009 | Mount Lemmon | Mount Lemmon Survey | · | 1.8 km | MPC · JPL |
| 346933 | 2010 AS_{37} | — | January 7, 2010 | Kitt Peak | Spacewatch | · | 1.0 km | MPC · JPL |
| 346934 | 2010 AQ_{44} | — | November 24, 2006 | Mount Lemmon | Mount Lemmon Survey | · | 950 m | MPC · JPL |
| 346935 | 2010 AF_{47} | — | January 8, 2010 | Kitt Peak | Spacewatch | · | 1.6 km | MPC · JPL |
| 346936 | 2010 AJ_{47} | — | January 8, 2010 | Kitt Peak | Spacewatch | · | 880 m | MPC · JPL |
| 346937 | 2010 AE_{50} | — | January 8, 2010 | Kitt Peak | Spacewatch | · | 1.4 km | MPC · JPL |
| 346938 | 2010 AA_{51} | — | March 31, 2003 | Kitt Peak | Spacewatch | · | 1.4 km | MPC · JPL |
| 346939 | 2010 AT_{51} | — | March 11, 2003 | Palomar | NEAT | · | 1.4 km | MPC · JPL |
| 346940 | 2010 AQ_{55} | — | January 8, 2010 | Kitt Peak | Spacewatch | · | 920 m | MPC · JPL |
| 346941 | 2010 AG_{59} | — | January 6, 2010 | Catalina | CSS | · | 1.3 km | MPC · JPL |
| 346942 | 2010 AU_{61} | — | January 6, 2010 | Kitt Peak | Spacewatch | · | 1.0 km | MPC · JPL |
| 346943 | 2010 AN_{67} | — | September 6, 1999 | Kitt Peak | Spacewatch | · | 1.8 km | MPC · JPL |
| 346944 | 2010 AH_{72} | — | January 13, 2010 | Mount Lemmon | Mount Lemmon Survey | · | 1.2 km | MPC · JPL |
| 346945 | 2010 AT_{74} | — | January 13, 2010 | Socorro | LINEAR | PHO | 3.6 km | MPC · JPL |
| 346946 | 2010 AF_{76} | — | January 13, 2010 | Socorro | LINEAR | · | 960 m | MPC · JPL |
| 346947 | 2010 AX_{76} | — | October 1, 2005 | Catalina | CSS | · | 990 m | MPC · JPL |
| 346948 | 2010 AJ_{81} | — | January 12, 2010 | Catalina | CSS | · | 4.5 km | MPC · JPL |
| 346949 | 2010 AJ_{87} | — | January 8, 2010 | WISE | WISE | · | 1.6 km | MPC · JPL |
| 346950 | 2010 AG_{89} | — | January 8, 2010 | WISE | WISE | · | 2.9 km | MPC · JPL |
| 346951 | 2010 AU_{90} | — | March 18, 2010 | Siding Spring | SSS | EUN | 2.0 km | MPC · JPL |
| 346952 | 2010 AQ_{94} | — | January 8, 2010 | WISE | WISE | · | 2.1 km | MPC · JPL |
| 346953 | 2010 AB_{100} | — | August 17, 2001 | Palomar | NEAT | · | 4.8 km | MPC · JPL |
| 346954 | 2010 AX_{105} | — | January 12, 2010 | WISE | WISE | · | 3.1 km | MPC · JPL |
| 346955 | 2010 AO_{107} | — | December 10, 2004 | Kitt Peak | Spacewatch | (194) | 1.7 km | MPC · JPL |
| 346956 | 2010 AB_{113} | — | January 13, 2010 | WISE | WISE | · | 4.1 km | MPC · JPL |
| 346957 | 2010 BJ_{4} | — | January 23, 2010 | Siding Spring | SSS | PHO | 1.8 km | MPC · JPL |
| 346958 | 2010 BX_{51} | — | January 20, 2010 | WISE | WISE | · | 4.0 km | MPC · JPL |
| 346959 | 2010 BM_{54} | — | November 7, 2007 | Kitt Peak | Spacewatch | · | 4.2 km | MPC · JPL |
| 346960 | 2010 BJ_{78} | — | January 24, 2010 | WISE | WISE | · | 2.5 km | MPC · JPL |
| 346961 | 2010 CU_{1} | — | February 2, 2010 | La Sagra | OAM | · | 750 m | MPC · JPL |
| 346962 | 2010 CB_{4} | — | February 6, 2010 | Mount Lemmon | Mount Lemmon Survey | · | 660 m | MPC · JPL |
| 346963 | 2010 CN_{4} | — | January 10, 2003 | Kitt Peak | Spacewatch | · | 870 m | MPC · JPL |
| 346964 | 2010 CR_{4} | — | February 6, 2010 | La Sagra | OAM | · | 910 m | MPC · JPL |
| 346965 | 2010 CS_{4} | — | February 6, 2010 | La Sagra | OAM | · | 1.3 km | MPC · JPL |
| 346966 | 2010 CD_{7} | — | February 6, 2010 | WISE | WISE | DOR | 2.9 km | MPC · JPL |
| 346967 | 2010 CP_{8} | — | February 7, 2010 | WISE | WISE | · | 2.8 km | MPC · JPL |
| 346968 | 2010 CZ_{31} | — | February 9, 2010 | Kitt Peak | Spacewatch | · | 1.3 km | MPC · JPL |
| 346969 | 2010 CO_{32} | — | February 9, 2010 | Kitt Peak | Spacewatch | · | 940 m | MPC · JPL |
| 346970 | 2010 CU_{32} | — | February 10, 2010 | Kitt Peak | Spacewatch | · | 890 m | MPC · JPL |
| 346971 | 2010 CK_{33} | — | September 30, 2005 | Mount Lemmon | Mount Lemmon Survey | · | 1.2 km | MPC · JPL |
| 346972 | 2010 CA_{34} | — | February 10, 2010 | Kitt Peak | Spacewatch | · | 2.1 km | MPC · JPL |
| 346973 | 2010 CP_{34} | — | April 28, 2006 | Cerro Tololo | Deep Ecliptic Survey | · | 1.9 km | MPC · JPL |
| 346974 | 2010 CC_{35} | — | February 10, 2010 | Kitt Peak | Spacewatch | · | 1.1 km | MPC · JPL |
| 346975 | 2010 CJ_{39} | — | February 13, 2010 | Mount Lemmon | Mount Lemmon Survey | · | 1.6 km | MPC · JPL |
| 346976 | 2010 CN_{62} | — | February 9, 2010 | Catalina | CSS | · | 930 m | MPC · JPL |
| 346977 | 2010 CV_{65} | — | January 7, 2006 | Mount Lemmon | Mount Lemmon Survey | · | 1.2 km | MPC · JPL |
| 346978 | 2010 CN_{66} | — | February 9, 2010 | Kitt Peak | Spacewatch | MAS | 840 m | MPC · JPL |
| 346979 | 2010 CB_{69} | — | February 10, 2010 | Kitt Peak | Spacewatch | · | 1.1 km | MPC · JPL |
| 346980 | 2010 CA_{82} | — | February 13, 2010 | Kitt Peak | Spacewatch | · | 2.0 km | MPC · JPL |
| 346981 | 2010 CO_{82} | — | February 13, 2010 | Kitt Peak | Spacewatch | · | 1.7 km | MPC · JPL |
| 346982 | 2010 CR_{84} | — | February 14, 2010 | Kitt Peak | Spacewatch | MAS | 720 m | MPC · JPL |
| 346983 | 2010 CD_{93} | — | September 29, 2008 | Mount Lemmon | Mount Lemmon Survey | (29841) | 1.7 km | MPC · JPL |
| 346984 | 2010 CR_{100} | — | February 14, 2010 | Mount Lemmon | Mount Lemmon Survey | · | 2.2 km | MPC · JPL |
| 346985 | 2010 CR_{103} | — | February 14, 2010 | Kitt Peak | Spacewatch | MAS | 710 m | MPC · JPL |
| 346986 | 2010 CS_{109} | — | February 14, 2010 | Mount Lemmon | Mount Lemmon Survey | · | 880 m | MPC · JPL |
| 346987 | 2010 CN_{123} | — | February 15, 2010 | Kitt Peak | Spacewatch | · | 2.7 km | MPC · JPL |
| 346988 | 2010 CJ_{125} | — | February 15, 2010 | Kitt Peak | Spacewatch | · | 1.6 km | MPC · JPL |
| 346989 | 2010 CU_{129} | — | February 10, 2010 | WISE | WISE | · | 2.7 km | MPC · JPL |
| 346990 | 2010 CP_{138} | — | February 14, 2010 | Kitt Peak | Spacewatch | · | 1.2 km | MPC · JPL |
| 346991 | 2010 CU_{140} | — | May 10, 2003 | Kitt Peak | Spacewatch | MAS | 840 m | MPC · JPL |
| 346992 | 2010 CB_{144} | — | February 9, 2010 | Kitt Peak | Spacewatch | · | 1.0 km | MPC · JPL |
| 346993 | 2010 CT_{148} | — | January 27, 2003 | Socorro | LINEAR | · | 880 m | MPC · JPL |
| 346994 | 2010 CO_{157} | — | February 15, 2010 | Kitt Peak | Spacewatch | · | 2.4 km | MPC · JPL |
| 346995 | 2010 CW_{166} | — | February 13, 2010 | Kitt Peak | Spacewatch | · | 2.1 km | MPC · JPL |
| 346996 | 2010 CU_{168} | — | February 6, 2010 | Kitt Peak | Spacewatch | EUN | 2.0 km | MPC · JPL |
| 346997 | 2010 CS_{170} | — | February 13, 2010 | Kitt Peak | Spacewatch | · | 1.7 km | MPC · JPL |
| 346998 Wakamura | 2010 CR_{182} | Wakamura | February 15, 2010 | Haleakala | Pan-STARRS 1 | · | 1.7 km | MPC · JPL |
| 346999 Evalilly | 2010 CQ_{183} | Evalilly | February 15, 2010 | Haleakala | Pan-STARRS 1 | AGN | 1.3 km | MPC · JPL |
| 347000 | 2010 CW_{216} | — | February 7, 2010 | WISE | WISE | · | 3.6 km | MPC · JPL |

back to top

== See also ==
- Meanings of minor-planet names: 346001–347000
