= Meanings of minor-planet names: 347001–348000 =

As minor planet discoveries are confirmed, they are given a permanent number by the IAU's Minor Planet Center (MPC), and the discoverers can then submit names for them, following the IAU's naming conventions. The list below concerns those minor planets in the specified number-range that have received names, and explains the meanings of those names.

Official naming citations of newly named small Solar System bodies are approved and published in a bulletin by IAU's Working Group for Small Bodies Nomenclature (WGSBN). Before May 2021, citations were published in MPC's Minor Planet Circulars for many decades. Recent citations can also be found on the JPL Small-Body Database (SBDB). Until his death in 2016, German astronomer Lutz D. Schmadel compiled these citations into the Dictionary of Minor Planet Names (DMP) and regularly updated the collection.

Based on Paul Herget's The Names of the Minor Planets, Schmadel also researched the unclear origin of numerous asteroids, most of which had been named prior to World War II. This article incorporates text from this source, which is in the public domain: SBDB New namings may only be added to this list below after official publication as the preannouncement of names is condemned. The WGSBN publishes a comprehensive guideline for the naming rules of non-cometary small Solar System bodies.

== 347001–347100 ==
Named minor planet	Provisional	This minor planet was named for...	Ref · Catalog
347016 Haydnhuntley	2010 DR_{77}	J. Haydn Huntley (b. 1963), an American software engineer.	IAU · 347016
347017 Pui-Hin	2010 DB_{78}	Pui Hin Rhoads (b. 1949) joined the computer group at the University of Hawaii's Institute for Astronomy, in the United States in 1986, and later became the head of the group.	IAU · 347017
347020 Hofheim	2010 EV_{20}	Hofheim am Taunus is a picturesque German district town located near Frankfurt, in the heart of the Rhein-Main-Region. First mentioned in the 1254, the town is home to the Sternwarte Hofheim, a lively community of amateur astronomers. This minor planet is named on the occasion of the observatory's 25th anniversary	IAU · 347020
347028 Važec	2010 EV_{44}	Važec, a village in northern Slovakia, within the district of Liptovský Mikuláš in the Žilina Region.	JPL · 347028

== 347101–347200 ==
back to top

Named minor planet	Provisional	This minor planet was named for...	Ref · Catalog
There are no named minor planets in this number range

== 347201–347300 ==
back to top

Named minor planet	Provisional	This minor planet was named for...	Ref · Catalog
347266 Carrière	2011 KR_{28}	Jean-Claude Carrière (1931–2021) was a French novelist, screenwriter, actor, and Academy Award honoree. He was a frequent collaborator with Luis Buñuel on the screenplays of Buñuel's late French films.	IAU · 347266

== 347301–347400 ==
back to top

Named minor planet	Provisional	This minor planet was named for...	Ref · Catalog
347336 Changmeemann	2012 NN_{1}	Meemann Chang (born 1936) is an academician of the Chinese Academy of Sciences and pioneered the study of tetrapod origin in China. Her pioneer work has revolutionized research on early vertebrate evolution.	IAU · 347336

== 347401–347500 ==
back to top

Named minor planet	Provisional	This minor planet was named for...	Ref · Catalog
There are no named minor planets in this number range

== 347501–347600 ==
back to top

Named minor planet	Provisional	This minor planet was named for...	Ref · Catalog
There are no named minor planets in this number range

== 347601–347700 ==
back to top

Named minor planet	Provisional	This minor planet was named for...	Ref · Catalog
There are no named minor planets in this number range

== 347701–347800 ==
back to top

Named minor planet	Provisional	This minor planet was named for...	Ref · Catalog
There are no named minor planets in this number range

== 347801–347900 ==
back to top

Named minor planet	Provisional	This minor planet was named for...	Ref · Catalog
There are no named minor planets in this number range

== 347901–348000 ==
back to top

Named minor planet	Provisional	This minor planet was named for...	Ref · Catalog
347940 Jorgezuluaga	2003 FZ_{128}	Jorge Zuluaga (born 1975) is a researcher, educator and popularizer of astronomy.	JPL · 347940

back to top

Preceded by 346,001–347,000	Meanings of minor-planet names List of minor planets: 347,001–348,000	Succeeded by 348,001–349,000
