= List of minor planets: 347001–348000 =

The following is a partial list of minor planets, running from minor-planet number 347001 through 348000, inclusive. The primary data for this and other partial lists is based on JPL's "Small-Body Orbital Elements" and data available from the Minor Planet Center. Critical list information is also provided by the MPC, unless otherwise specified from Lowell Observatory. A detailed description of the table's columns and additional sources are given on the main page including a complete list of every page in this series, and a statistical break-up on the dynamical classification of minor planets.

Also see the summary list of all named bodies in numerical and alphabetical order, and the corresponding naming citations for the number range of this particular list. New namings may only be added to this list after official publication, as the preannouncement of names is condemned by the Working Group for Small Bodies Nomenclature of the International Astronomical Union.

Near-Earth obj.	MBA (inner)	MBA (outer)	Centaur
Mars-crosser	MBA (middle)	Jupiter trojan	Trans-Neptunian obj.
Unclassified

== 347001–347100 ==
Designation			Discovery			Properties		Ref
Permanent	Provisional	Named after	Date	Site	Discoverer(s)	Category	Diam.	Ref
347001	2010 CN_{220}	—	May 6, 2010	Mount Lemmon	Mount Lemmon Survey	·	4.2 km	MPC · JPL
347002	2010 CC_{227}	—	February 9, 2010	WISE	WISE	·	3.8 km	MPC · JPL
347003	2010 CH_{229}	—	February 9, 2010	WISE	WISE	·	5.7 km	MPC · JPL
347004	2010 DF_{2}	—	February 16, 2010	Kitt Peak	Spacewatch	WIT	1.2 km	MPC · JPL
347005	2010 DJ_{12}	—	February 20, 2010	Great Shefford	Birtwhistle, P.	·	2.2 km	MPC · JPL
347006	2010 DX_{21}	—	February 17, 2010	Socorro	LINEAR	·	1.0 km	MPC · JPL
347007	2010 DM_{23}	—	February 18, 2010	WISE	WISE	·	4.8 km	MPC · JPL
347008	2010 DP_{32}	—	February 18, 2010	WISE	WISE	ADE	3.6 km	MPC · JPL
347009	2010 DF_{33}	—	February 19, 2010	WISE	WISE	·	6.6 km	MPC · JPL
347010	2010 DC_{37}	—	February 16, 2010	Kitt Peak	Spacewatch	HOF	3.2 km	MPC · JPL
347011	2010 DF_{39}	—	February 16, 2010	Kitt Peak	Spacewatch	·	1.7 km	MPC · JPL
347012	2010 DL_{42}	—	February 17, 2010	Kitt Peak	Spacewatch	·	1.4 km	MPC · JPL
347013	2010 DA_{43}	—	February 17, 2010	Kitt Peak	Spacewatch	NYS	950 m	MPC · JPL
347014	2010 DT_{55}	—	February 22, 2010	WISE	WISE	URS	4.0 km	MPC · JPL
347015	2010 DL_{74}	—	February 18, 2010	Mount Lemmon	Mount Lemmon Survey	·	1.2 km	MPC · JPL
347016 Haydnhuntley	2010 DR_{77}	Haydnhuntley	February 16, 2010	Haleakala	Pan-STARRS 1	·	2.3 km	MPC · JPL
347017 Pui-Hin	2010 DB_{78}	Pui-Hin	February 16, 2010	Haleakala	Pan-STARRS 1	·	1.3 km	MPC · JPL
347018	2010 DZ_{78}	—	February 19, 2010	Kitt Peak	Spacewatch	·	1.7 km	MPC · JPL
347019	2010 EL_{12}	—	March 4, 2010	Kitt Peak	Spacewatch	·	2.6 km	MPC · JPL
347020 Hofheim	2010 EV_{20}	Hofheim	March 7, 2010	Taunus	Karge, S., E. Schwab	·	1.3 km	MPC · JPL
347021	2010 EB_{34}	—	March 5, 2010	Kitt Peak	Spacewatch	·	1.7 km	MPC · JPL
347022	2010 EV_{35}	—	March 10, 2010	La Sagra	OAM	·	1.3 km	MPC · JPL
347023	2010 EZ_{38}	—	April 29, 2006	Siding Spring	SSS	·	2.0 km	MPC · JPL
347024	2010 EQ_{39}	—	March 10, 2010	La Sagra	OAM	·	1.4 km	MPC · JPL
347025	2010 EP_{40}	—	March 12, 2010	Catalina	CSS	·	1.6 km	MPC · JPL
347026	2010 EN_{43}	—	March 6, 2010	Dauban	Kugel, F.	·	2.1 km	MPC · JPL
347027	2010 EJ_{44}	—	March 13, 2010	Črni Vrh	Mikuž, B.	·	3.2 km	MPC · JPL
347028 Važec	2010 EV_{44}	Važec	March 13, 2010	LightBuckets	T. Vorobjov	NYS	970 m	MPC · JPL
347029	2010 EV_{69}	—	March 13, 2010	Kitt Peak	Spacewatch	MRX	940 m	MPC · JPL
347030	2010 EX_{70}	—	March 12, 2010	Kitt Peak	Spacewatch	·	1.8 km	MPC · JPL
347031	2010 EZ_{76}	—	March 12, 2010	Kitt Peak	Spacewatch	HOF	2.9 km	MPC · JPL
347032	2010 EM_{82}	—	March 12, 2010	Kitt Peak	Spacewatch	·	2.6 km	MPC · JPL
347033	2010 EK_{85}	—	October 3, 2003	Kitt Peak	Spacewatch	·	2.2 km	MPC · JPL
347034	2010 EJ_{88}	—	March 14, 2010	Kitt Peak	Spacewatch	·	1.6 km	MPC · JPL
347035	2010 EE_{94}	—	February 20, 2002	Kitt Peak	Spacewatch	·	1.4 km	MPC · JPL
347036	2010 EH_{94}	—	March 14, 2010	Mount Lemmon	Mount Lemmon Survey	MAS	700 m	MPC · JPL
347037	2010 EU_{101}	—	March 15, 2010	Kitt Peak	Spacewatch	NYS	1.1 km	MPC · JPL
347038	2010 EF_{104}	—	March 7, 2010	Črni Vrh	J. Zakrajšek, H. Mikuž	·	1.5 km	MPC · JPL
347039	2010 EV_{106}	—	September 20, 2003	Kitt Peak	Spacewatch	·	3.1 km	MPC · JPL
347040	2010 EW_{106}	—	September 19, 2001	Socorro	LINEAR	MAS	800 m	MPC · JPL
347041	2010 EH_{109}	—	March 15, 2010	Kitt Peak	Spacewatch	DOR	2.4 km	MPC · JPL
347042	2010 EN_{113}	—	October 28, 2008	Kitt Peak	Spacewatch	·	1.5 km	MPC · JPL
347043	2010 EU_{120}	—	January 17, 2005	Kitt Peak	Spacewatch	·	1.8 km	MPC · JPL
347044	2010 EA_{122}	—	October 22, 2003	Kitt Peak	Spacewatch	·	2.3 km	MPC · JPL
347045	2010 EU_{122}	—	March 15, 2010	Kitt Peak	Spacewatch	·	1.5 km	MPC · JPL
347046	2010 EU_{123}	—	March 10, 2010	Purple Mountain	PMO NEO Survey Program	KON	3.3 km	MPC · JPL
347047	2010 EM_{124}	—	March 12, 2010	Catalina	CSS	·	2.1 km	MPC · JPL
347048	2010 ET_{124}	—	April 21, 2006	Catalina	CSS	·	2.9 km	MPC · JPL
347049	2010 EZ_{126}	—	October 6, 2008	Mount Lemmon	Mount Lemmon Survey	·	1.3 km	MPC · JPL
347050	2010 EK_{127}	—	March 15, 2010	Catalina	CSS	·	1.3 km	MPC · JPL
347051	2010 EQ_{130}	—	March 13, 2010	Kitt Peak	Spacewatch	·	2.3 km	MPC · JPL
347052	2010 EV_{130}	—	March 13, 2010	Mount Lemmon	Mount Lemmon Survey	·	1.9 km	MPC · JPL
347053	2010 ET_{137}	—	March 12, 2010	Kitt Peak	Spacewatch	·	2.1 km	MPC · JPL
347054	2010 EZ_{137}	—	March 13, 2010	Catalina	CSS	TIR	2.4 km	MPC · JPL
347055	2010 ER_{138}	—	March 15, 2010	Mount Lemmon	Mount Lemmon Survey	·	2.8 km	MPC · JPL
347056	2010 EZ_{138}	—	March 14, 2010	La Sagra	OAM	·	2.0 km	MPC · JPL
347057	2010 EY_{139}	—	December 21, 2008	Mount Lemmon	Mount Lemmon Survey	·	1.7 km	MPC · JPL
347058	2010 EE_{140}	—	March 15, 2010	Catalina	CSS	·	2.7 km	MPC · JPL
347059	2010 FU_{1}	—	March 16, 2010	Mount Lemmon	Mount Lemmon Survey	·	2.3 km	MPC · JPL
347060	2010 FQ_{3}	—	March 16, 2010	Mount Lemmon	Mount Lemmon Survey	EUN	1.6 km	MPC · JPL
347061	2010 FR_{4}	—	March 16, 2010	Mount Lemmon	Mount Lemmon Survey	·	1.3 km	MPC · JPL
347062	2010 FY_{10}	—	April 27, 2006	Kitt Peak	Spacewatch	·	1.7 km	MPC · JPL
347063	2010 FY_{24}	—	March 18, 2010	Mount Lemmon	Mount Lemmon Survey	MRX	1.4 km	MPC · JPL
347064	2010 FF_{27}	—	March 20, 2010	Mount Lemmon	Mount Lemmon Survey	·	2.0 km	MPC · JPL
347065	2010 FT_{28}	—	March 16, 2010	Catalina	CSS	TIR	2.9 km	MPC · JPL
347066	2010 FY_{30}	—	March 17, 2010	Kitt Peak	Spacewatch	HYG	2.7 km	MPC · JPL
347067	2010 FD_{31}	—	March 18, 2010	Kitt Peak	Spacewatch	·	2.0 km	MPC · JPL
347068	2010 FL_{47}	—	February 2, 2005	Kitt Peak	Spacewatch	·	2.0 km	MPC · JPL
347069	2010 FR_{54}	—	March 21, 2010	Kitt Peak	Spacewatch	·	3.6 km	MPC · JPL
347070	2010 FP_{57}	—	April 30, 2006	Catalina	CSS	·	1.8 km	MPC · JPL
347071	2010 FW_{83}	—	March 21, 2010	Catalina	CSS	·	1.7 km	MPC · JPL
347072	2010 FF_{87}	—	March 19, 2010	Mount Lemmon	Mount Lemmon Survey	·	3.0 km	MPC · JPL
347073	2010 FW_{88}	—	March 19, 2010	Kitt Peak	Spacewatch	·	1.7 km	MPC · JPL
347074	2010 FO_{100}	—	September 30, 2003	Kitt Peak	Spacewatch	·	1.5 km	MPC · JPL
347075	2010 GS_{23}	—	February 24, 2006	Kitt Peak	Spacewatch	·	2.8 km	MPC · JPL
347076	2010 GD_{26}	—	April 4, 2010	Kitt Peak	Spacewatch	·	1.8 km	MPC · JPL
347077	2010 GS_{27}	—	April 5, 2010	Catalina	CSS	ADE	2.8 km	MPC · JPL
347078	2010 GR_{30}	—	April 4, 2010	Kitt Peak	Spacewatch	·	1.5 km	MPC · JPL
347079	2010 GX_{31}	—	April 6, 2010	Črni Vrh	Matičič, S.	·	4.6 km	MPC · JPL
347080	2010 GM_{32}	—	April 8, 2010	Črni Vrh	Skvarč, J.	·	2.7 km	MPC · JPL
347081	2010 GW_{35}	—	November 19, 2003	Kitt Peak	Spacewatch	NEM	2.7 km	MPC · JPL
347082	2010 GV_{39}	—	April 6, 2010	WISE	WISE	·	1.3 km	MPC · JPL
347083	2010 GK_{75}	—	April 8, 2010	XuYi	PMO NEO Survey Program	·	2.7 km	MPC · JPL
347084	2010 GY_{96}	—	April 4, 2010	Kitt Peak	Spacewatch	AST	1.7 km	MPC · JPL
347085	2010 GD_{102}	—	April 5, 2010	Kitt Peak	Spacewatch	EOS	1.9 km	MPC · JPL
347086	2010 GM_{105}	—	April 7, 2010	Kitt Peak	Spacewatch	·	2.7 km	MPC · JPL
347087	2010 GV_{108}	—	March 21, 2010	Kitt Peak	Spacewatch	·	3.3 km	MPC · JPL
347088	2010 GL_{111}	—	September 13, 2007	Mount Lemmon	Mount Lemmon Survey	AEO	1.6 km	MPC · JPL
347089	2010 GD_{114}	—	April 10, 2010	Kitt Peak	Spacewatch	·	1.9 km	MPC · JPL
347090	2010 GG_{119}	—	April 11, 2010	Mount Lemmon	Mount Lemmon Survey	·	1.5 km	MPC · JPL
347091	2010 GF_{123}	—	April 14, 2010	Kitt Peak	Spacewatch	·	1.7 km	MPC · JPL
347092	2010 GJ_{132}	—	April 10, 2010	Mount Lemmon	Mount Lemmon Survey	·	4.0 km	MPC · JPL
347093	2010 GN_{135}	—	April 4, 2010	Kitt Peak	Spacewatch	·	3.4 km	MPC · JPL
347094	2010 GA_{136}	—	April 6, 2005	Mount Lemmon	Mount Lemmon Survey	·	2.0 km	MPC · JPL
347095	2010 GU_{140}	—	January 15, 2005	Kitt Peak	Spacewatch	·	1.6 km	MPC · JPL
347096	2010 GN_{144}	—	April 11, 2010	Mount Lemmon	Mount Lemmon Survey	KOR	1.4 km	MPC · JPL
347097	2010 GJ_{160}	—	December 5, 2008	Kitt Peak	Spacewatch	·	2.4 km	MPC · JPL
347098	2010 HO_{17}	—	February 9, 2007	Kitt Peak	Spacewatch	L5	12 km	MPC · JPL
347099	2010 HO_{21}	—	April 22, 2010	WISE	WISE	L5 · 010	10 km	MPC · JPL
347100	2010 HS_{23}	—	April 25, 2010	Mount Lemmon	Mount Lemmon Survey	·	2.0 km	MPC · JPL

== 347101–347200 ==
back to top

Designation			Discovery			Properties		Ref
Permanent	Provisional	Named after	Date	Site	Discoverer(s)	Category	Diam.	Ref
347101	2010 HZ_{53}	—	April 24, 2010	WISE	WISE	·	3.6 km	MPC · JPL
347102	2010 HS_{79}	—	April 20, 2010	Kitt Peak	Spacewatch	NYS	1.3 km	MPC · JPL
347103	2010 HX_{79}	—	April 20, 2010	Kitt Peak	Spacewatch	·	4.2 km	MPC · JPL
347104	2010 HJ_{103}	—	April 12, 2004	Kitt Peak	Spacewatch	·	2.9 km	MPC · JPL
347105	2010 HO_{103}	—	October 1, 2008	Mount Lemmon	Mount Lemmon Survey	·	1.7 km	MPC · JPL
347106	2010 HG_{104}	—	April 16, 2010	Siding Spring	SSS	·	3.3 km	MPC · JPL
347107	2010 HD_{105}	—	October 8, 2007	Mount Lemmon	Mount Lemmon Survey	KOR	1.3 km	MPC · JPL
347108	2010 HJ_{107}	—	September 18, 2006	Catalina	CSS	·	3.7 km	MPC · JPL
347109	2010 JX_{29}	—	May 3, 2010	Kitt Peak	Spacewatch	·	2.3 km	MPC · JPL
347110	2010 JD_{37}	—	April 17, 2010	Kitt Peak	Spacewatch	·	3.4 km	MPC · JPL
347111	2010 JR_{43}	—	May 16, 2005	Palomar	NEAT	·	2.3 km	MPC · JPL
347112	2010 JE_{48}	—	September 25, 2006	Kitt Peak	Spacewatch	VER	2.8 km	MPC · JPL
347113	2010 JA_{74}	—	May 8, 2010	Mount Lemmon	Mount Lemmon Survey	·	2.6 km	MPC · JPL
347114	2010 JS_{76}	—	November 17, 1998	Kitt Peak	Spacewatch	·	2.4 km	MPC · JPL
347115	2010 JK_{78}	—	May 11, 2010	Mount Lemmon	Mount Lemmon Survey	·	3.6 km	MPC · JPL
347116	2010 JY_{79}	—	May 12, 2010	Kitt Peak	Spacewatch	·	3.4 km	MPC · JPL
347117	2010 JK_{80}	—	May 4, 2010	Catalina	CSS	MAR	2.2 km	MPC · JPL
347118	2010 JS_{82}	—	May 12, 2010	Nogales	Tenagra II	JUN	1.5 km	MPC · JPL
347119	2010 JT_{116}	—	May 4, 2010	Catalina	CSS	·	2.3 km	MPC · JPL
347120	2010 JF_{122}	—	May 13, 2010	Kitt Peak	Spacewatch	(5)	1.8 km	MPC · JPL
347121	2010 JU_{149}	—	May 7, 2010	Mount Lemmon	Mount Lemmon Survey	EUN	1.6 km	MPC · JPL
347122	2010 JU_{151}	—	February 17, 2001	Haleakala	NEAT	·	2.3 km	MPC · JPL
347123	2010 JF_{155}	—	November 7, 2007	Kitt Peak	Spacewatch	·	3.8 km	MPC · JPL
347124	2010 JQ_{162}	—	April 1, 2005	Kitt Peak	Spacewatch	·	2.2 km	MPC · JPL
347125	2010 JN_{164}	—	May 9, 2010	Mount Lemmon	Mount Lemmon Survey	EOS	1.9 km	MPC · JPL
347126	2010 JF_{168}	—	May 12, 2010	Kitt Peak	Spacewatch	·	4.3 km	MPC · JPL
347127	2010 JO_{174}	—	May 11, 2010	Mount Lemmon	Mount Lemmon Survey	·	4.5 km	MPC · JPL
347128	2010 JQ_{175}	—	May 13, 2010	Kitt Peak	Spacewatch	·	3.2 km	MPC · JPL
347129	2010 JZ_{175}	—	May 14, 2010	Mount Lemmon	Mount Lemmon Survey	·	4.0 km	MPC · JPL
347130	2010 KT_{9}	—	May 17, 2010	Kitt Peak	Spacewatch	·	5.1 km	MPC · JPL
347131	2010 KB_{62}	—	May 24, 2010	Mount Lemmon	Mount Lemmon Survey	HNS	1.6 km	MPC · JPL
347132	2010 LE_{33}	—	June 6, 2010	WISE	WISE	·	3.1 km	MPC · JPL
347133	2010 LT_{77}	—	June 10, 2010	WISE	WISE	·	1.5 km	MPC · JPL
347134	2010 MC_{113}	—	February 2, 2006	Mount Lemmon	Mount Lemmon Survey	L5	10 km	MPC · JPL
347135	2010 NZ_{93}	—	July 3, 2010	WISE	WISE	·	2.4 km	MPC · JPL
347136	2010 OO_{33}	—	July 20, 2010	WISE	WISE	·	3.1 km	MPC · JPL
347137	2010 OO_{46}	—	July 22, 2010	WISE	WISE	·	4.3 km	MPC · JPL
347138	2010 OB_{50}	—	July 22, 2010	WISE	WISE	·	4.6 km	MPC · JPL
347139	2010 OF_{66}	—	April 22, 2004	Kitt Peak	Spacewatch	·	4.9 km	MPC · JPL
347140	2010 OU_{70}	—	July 25, 2010	WISE	WISE	·	5.4 km	MPC · JPL
347141	2010 OO_{71}	—	December 17, 2003	Kitt Peak	Spacewatch	·	3.7 km	MPC · JPL
347142	2010 OB_{77}	—	December 30, 2008	Mount Lemmon	Mount Lemmon Survey	HOF	2.6 km	MPC · JPL
347143	2010 OX_{88}	—	July 27, 2010	WISE	WISE	·	4.2 km	MPC · JPL
347144	2010 OR_{98}	—	July 28, 2010	WISE	WISE	·	3.4 km	MPC · JPL
347145	2010 OF_{121}	—	July 31, 2010	WISE	WISE	·	2.6 km	MPC · JPL
347146	2010 OC_{122}	—	July 31, 2010	WISE	WISE	·	4.7 km	MPC · JPL
347147	2010 SJ_{33}	—	September 28, 2006	Kitt Peak	Spacewatch	·	1.1 km	MPC · JPL
347148	2010 WY	—	October 17, 2009	Mount Lemmon	Mount Lemmon Survey	L4 · ERY	10 km	MPC · JPL
347149	2011 CB_{76}	—	July 3, 2005	Siding Spring	SSS	·	1.2 km	MPC · JPL
347150	2011 CH_{76}	—	September 6, 2004	Siding Spring	SSS	H	580 m	MPC · JPL
347151	2011 CP_{87}	—	September 16, 2009	Kitt Peak	Spacewatch	·	1.5 km	MPC · JPL
347152	2011 CV_{88}	—	March 16, 2007	Kitt Peak	Spacewatch	·	2.7 km	MPC · JPL
347153	2011 EZ_{13}	—	November 18, 1995	Kitt Peak	Spacewatch	·	820 m	MPC · JPL
347154	2011 EE_{14}	—	March 2, 2011	Mount Lemmon	Mount Lemmon Survey	·	2.0 km	MPC · JPL
347155	2011 ET_{19}	—	October 11, 2004	Kitt Peak	Spacewatch	·	1.8 km	MPC · JPL
347156	2011 EZ_{42}	—	August 7, 2004	Siding Spring	SSS	·	1.5 km	MPC · JPL
347157	2011 EG_{63}	—	January 28, 2006	Mount Lemmon	Mount Lemmon Survey	·	2.6 km	MPC · JPL
347158	2011 EA_{72}	—	January 10, 2002	Palomar	NEAT	EUN	1.5 km	MPC · JPL
347159	2011 FL_{7}	—	October 1, 2005	Mount Lemmon	Mount Lemmon Survey	NYS	1.5 km	MPC · JPL
347160	2011 FB_{8}	—	March 26, 2007	Mount Lemmon	Mount Lemmon Survey	·	1.5 km	MPC · JPL
347161	2011 FW_{8}	—	February 6, 2007	Kitt Peak	Spacewatch	·	1.1 km	MPC · JPL
347162	2011 FN_{12}	—	April 8, 1995	Kitt Peak	T. J. Balonek	·	750 m	MPC · JPL
347163	2011 FD_{13}	—	April 25, 2004	Catalina	CSS	·	860 m	MPC · JPL
347164	2011 FZ_{17}	—	April 12, 2007	Siding Spring	SSS	·	1.6 km	MPC · JPL
347165	2011 FU_{19}	—	September 6, 2008	Catalina	CSS	·	1.4 km	MPC · JPL
347166	2011 FN_{24}	—	May 15, 2001	Haleakala	NEAT	·	810 m	MPC · JPL
347167	2011 FE_{29}	—	August 4, 2005	Palomar	NEAT	·	780 m	MPC · JPL
347168	2011 FU_{32}	—	May 12, 2007	Kitt Peak	Spacewatch	EUN	1.1 km	MPC · JPL
347169	2011 FJ_{33}	—	October 14, 2001	Apache Point	SDSS	·	3.1 km	MPC · JPL
347170	2011 FD_{41}	—	September 13, 2002	Palomar	NEAT	EOS	2.2 km	MPC · JPL
347171	2011 FO_{46}	—	August 24, 2008	Kitt Peak	Spacewatch	·	1.1 km	MPC · JPL
347172	2011 FB_{60}	—	August 27, 2008	Hibiscus	Teamo, N.	MAS	690 m	MPC · JPL
347173	2011 FG_{94}	—	July 30, 2008	Mount Lemmon	Mount Lemmon Survey	NYS	950 m	MPC · JPL
347174	2011 FO_{134}	—	July 28, 2005	Palomar	NEAT	V	680 m	MPC · JPL
347175	2011 FB_{143}	—	February 8, 2007	Mount Lemmon	Mount Lemmon Survey	MAS	750 m	MPC · JPL
347176	2011 FT_{147}	—	October 17, 2009	Mount Lemmon	Mount Lemmon Survey	V	850 m	MPC · JPL
347177	2011 FE_{149}	—	October 7, 2005	Anderson Mesa	LONEOS	·	1.0 km	MPC · JPL
347178	2011 FA_{150}	—	January 14, 2011	Kitt Peak	Spacewatch	·	2.5 km	MPC · JPL
347179	2011 FJ_{150}	—	December 11, 2009	Mount Lemmon	Mount Lemmon Survey	·	790 m	MPC · JPL
347180	2011 FW_{154}	—	March 26, 2003	Apache Point	SDSS	H	670 m	MPC · JPL
347181	2011 GD_{11}	—	October 24, 2009	Kitt Peak	Spacewatch	·	1.5 km	MPC · JPL
347182	2011 GM_{15}	—	May 20, 2006	Kitt Peak	Spacewatch	H	510 m	MPC · JPL
347183	2011 GH_{31}	—	October 4, 2004	Kitt Peak	Spacewatch	H	470 m	MPC · JPL
347184	2011 GG_{42}	—	November 9, 2009	Kitt Peak	Spacewatch	(883)	990 m	MPC · JPL
347185	2011 GA_{45}	—	May 16, 2004	Siding Spring	SSS	NYS	1.1 km	MPC · JPL
347186	2011 GW_{48}	—	October 29, 2008	Mount Lemmon	Mount Lemmon Survey	·	3.6 km	MPC · JPL
347187	2011 GK_{49}	—	March 17, 2004	Kitt Peak	Spacewatch	·	670 m	MPC · JPL
347188	2011 GL_{55}	—	August 13, 2002	Socorro	LINEAR	·	890 m	MPC · JPL
347189	2011 GM_{57}	—	April 2, 2006	Catalina	CSS	·	3.3 km	MPC · JPL
347190	2011 GX_{59}	—	November 3, 2005	Mount Lemmon	Mount Lemmon Survey	V	840 m	MPC · JPL
347191	2011 GP_{70}	—	December 13, 2006	Kitt Peak	Spacewatch	·	760 m	MPC · JPL
347192	2011 GU_{73}	—	January 10, 2007	Kitt Peak	Spacewatch	·	700 m	MPC · JPL
347193	2011 GZ_{81}	—	September 11, 2007	Catalina	CSS	EOS	2.6 km	MPC · JPL
347194	2011 HK_{6}	—	March 17, 2004	Socorro	LINEAR	·	1.0 km	MPC · JPL
347195	2011 HW_{6}	—	November 14, 2007	Mount Lemmon	Mount Lemmon Survey	H	670 m	MPC · JPL
347196	2011 HV_{7}	—	November 14, 2007	Mount Lemmon	Mount Lemmon Survey	H	650 m	MPC · JPL
347197	2011 HV_{10}	—	March 11, 2007	Kitt Peak	Spacewatch	·	1.7 km	MPC · JPL
347198	2011 HZ_{16}	—	September 14, 2005	Catalina	CSS	PHO	880 m	MPC · JPL
347199	2011 HG_{18}	—	July 29, 2008	Kitt Peak	Spacewatch	·	1.2 km	MPC · JPL
347200	2011 HX_{18}	—	November 19, 2008	Catalina	CSS	·	2.0 km	MPC · JPL

== 347201–347300 ==
back to top

Designation			Discovery			Properties		Ref
Permanent	Provisional	Named after	Date	Site	Discoverer(s)	Category	Diam.	Ref
347201	2011 HN_{19}	—	September 6, 2008	Catalina	CSS	·	1.3 km	MPC · JPL
347202	2011 HD_{21}	—	April 5, 2005	Palomar	NEAT	T_{j} (2.99)	3.9 km	MPC · JPL
347203	2011 HT_{26}	—	February 21, 2006	Mount Lemmon	Mount Lemmon Survey	·	1.7 km	MPC · JPL
347204	2011 HB_{28}	—	April 30, 1997	Socorro	LINEAR	·	750 m	MPC · JPL
347205	2011 HC_{28}	—	March 26, 2001	Socorro	LINEAR	·	790 m	MPC · JPL
347206	2011 HD_{29}	—	May 22, 2001	Kitt Peak	Spacewatch	·	730 m	MPC · JPL
347207	2011 HM_{30}	—	August 30, 2005	Kitt Peak	Spacewatch	·	800 m	MPC · JPL
347208	2011 HG_{32}	—	June 23, 2003	Anderson Mesa	LONEOS	·	1.9 km	MPC · JPL
347209	2011 HN_{34}	—	October 21, 1995	Kitt Peak	Spacewatch	·	2.1 km	MPC · JPL
347210	2011 HT_{35}	—	March 9, 2005	Kitt Peak	Spacewatch	EOS	2.3 km	MPC · JPL
347211	2011 HF_{36}	—	August 29, 2005	Palomar	NEAT	·	810 m	MPC · JPL
347212	2011 HK_{37}	—	October 29, 2003	Kitt Peak	Spacewatch	·	2.6 km	MPC · JPL
347213	2011 HD_{50}	—	April 19, 2006	Kitt Peak	Spacewatch	·	2.4 km	MPC · JPL
347214	2011 HX_{54}	—	December 27, 2006	Mount Lemmon	Mount Lemmon Survey	V	730 m	MPC · JPL
347215	2011 HD_{60}	—	October 6, 2005	Kitt Peak	Spacewatch	·	610 m	MPC · JPL
347216	2011 HD_{64}	—	November 5, 2005	Kitt Peak	Spacewatch	·	990 m	MPC · JPL
347217	2011 HO_{65}	—	May 21, 2006	Kitt Peak	Spacewatch	EOS	2.4 km	MPC · JPL
347218	2011 HR_{69}	—	February 17, 2004	Kitt Peak	Spacewatch	·	730 m	MPC · JPL
347219	2011 HS_{71}	—	April 18, 1996	Kitt Peak	Spacewatch	·	1.0 km	MPC · JPL
347220	2011 HQ_{72}	—	July 8, 2003	Palomar	NEAT	·	2.3 km	MPC · JPL
347221	2011 HV_{73}	—	July 12, 2002	Palomar	NEAT	·	2.4 km	MPC · JPL
347222	2011 HN_{76}	—	November 10, 2009	Kitt Peak	Spacewatch	·	740 m	MPC · JPL
347223	2011 HW_{77}	—	November 8, 2008	Mount Lemmon	Mount Lemmon Survey	·	1.7 km	MPC · JPL
347224	2011 HO_{78}	—	March 20, 2004	Kitt Peak	Spacewatch	·	830 m	MPC · JPL
347225	2011 HP_{81}	—	December 31, 2005	Kitt Peak	Spacewatch	·	1.6 km	MPC · JPL
347226	2011 HM_{82}	—	September 6, 2008	Catalina	CSS	·	1.2 km	MPC · JPL
347227	2011 HS_{82}	—	October 1, 2005	Mount Lemmon	Mount Lemmon Survey	·	1.2 km	MPC · JPL
347228	2011 HT_{86}	—	April 26, 2011	Kitt Peak	Spacewatch	V	690 m	MPC · JPL
347229	2011 HW_{91}	—	April 28, 2004	Kitt Peak	Spacewatch	·	730 m	MPC · JPL
347230	2011 HJ_{95}	—	September 18, 2001	Kitt Peak	Spacewatch	·	3.0 km	MPC · JPL
347231	2011 JU_{7}	—	December 27, 2006	Mount Lemmon	Mount Lemmon Survey	V	740 m	MPC · JPL
347232	2011 JN_{8}	—	November 5, 2004	Palomar	NEAT	H	740 m	MPC · JPL
347233	2011 JZ_{9}	—	October 26, 2008	Mount Lemmon	Mount Lemmon Survey	·	1.8 km	MPC · JPL
347234	2011 JL_{10}	—	July 11, 2005	Kitt Peak	Spacewatch	EUP	5.2 km	MPC · JPL
347235	2011 JT_{10}	—	January 31, 2006	Kitt Peak	Spacewatch	·	2.1 km	MPC · JPL
347236	2011 JJ_{11}	—	August 21, 2004	Siding Spring	SSS	·	1.8 km	MPC · JPL
347237	2011 JY_{11}	—	November 4, 2005	Kitt Peak	Spacewatch	·	1.2 km	MPC · JPL
347238	2011 JO_{15}	—	May 4, 2003	Haleakala	NEAT	H	870 m	MPC · JPL
347239	2011 JG_{17}	—	March 11, 2007	Kitt Peak	Spacewatch	·	1.3 km	MPC · JPL
347240	2011 JS_{17}	—	January 31, 2006	Kitt Peak	Spacewatch	·	1.7 km	MPC · JPL
347241	2011 JC_{18}	—	September 29, 2008	Mount Lemmon	Mount Lemmon Survey	slow	1.8 km	MPC · JPL
347242	2011 JD_{25}	—	January 16, 2004	Kitt Peak	Spacewatch	·	1.2 km	MPC · JPL
347243	2011 JJ_{26}	—	September 9, 2007	Kitt Peak	Spacewatch	·	3.2 km	MPC · JPL
347244	2011 JK_{27}	—	February 2, 2006	Kitt Peak	Spacewatch	·	2.3 km	MPC · JPL
347245	2011 JM_{28}	—	October 31, 2005	Kitt Peak	Spacewatch	·	870 m	MPC · JPL
347246	2011 JY_{28}	—	November 21, 2009	Kitt Peak	Spacewatch	·	1.2 km	MPC · JPL
347247	2011 JJ_{29}	—	March 13, 2007	Kitt Peak	Spacewatch	·	1.1 km	MPC · JPL
347248	2011 KX_{1}	—	May 8, 2006	Mount Lemmon	Mount Lemmon Survey	·	3.0 km	MPC · JPL
347249	2011 KO_{2}	—	October 22, 2005	Kitt Peak	Spacewatch	·	960 m	MPC · JPL
347250	2011 KX_{4}	—	November 1, 2005	Mount Lemmon	Mount Lemmon Survey	·	860 m	MPC · JPL
347251	2011 KK_{7}	—	August 28, 2005	Kitt Peak	Spacewatch	·	780 m	MPC · JPL
347252	2011 KD_{8}	—	November 30, 2003	Kitt Peak	Spacewatch	·	2.4 km	MPC · JPL
347253	2011 KU_{8}	—	June 3, 2003	Kitt Peak	Spacewatch	·	980 m	MPC · JPL
347254	2011 KZ_{8}	—	November 8, 2009	Kitt Peak	Spacewatch	·	910 m	MPC · JPL
347255	2011 KW_{9}	—	June 27, 1998	Caussols	ODAS	·	2.0 km	MPC · JPL
347256	2011 KE_{10}	—	September 22, 2008	Kitt Peak	Spacewatch	·	1.2 km	MPC · JPL
347257	2011 KG_{11}	—	April 11, 2004	Palomar	NEAT	·	860 m	MPC · JPL
347258	2011 KJ_{17}	—	August 21, 2006	Kitt Peak	Spacewatch	·	2.7 km	MPC · JPL
347259	2011 KS_{17}	—	October 7, 2008	Mount Lemmon	Mount Lemmon Survey	·	1.8 km	MPC · JPL
347260	2011 KU_{18}	—	September 28, 2003	Kitt Peak	Spacewatch	·	1.7 km	MPC · JPL
347261	2011 KB_{20}	—	January 8, 2006	Mount Lemmon	Mount Lemmon Survey	HNS	1.2 km	MPC · JPL
347262	2011 KB_{24}	—	March 10, 2007	Kitt Peak	Spacewatch	NYS	1.2 km	MPC · JPL
347263	2011 KH_{27}	—	November 3, 2008	Mount Lemmon	Mount Lemmon Survey	EUN	2.0 km	MPC · JPL
347264	2011 KU_{27}	—	August 9, 2007	Socorro	LINEAR	·	2.0 km	MPC · JPL
347265	2011 KB_{28}	—	October 30, 2008	Kitt Peak	Spacewatch	·	1.6 km	MPC · JPL
347266 Carrière	2011 KR_{28}	Carrière	June 13, 2004	Saint-Sulpice	B. Christophe	·	1.2 km	MPC · JPL
347267	2011 KS_{28}	—	January 27, 2006	Kitt Peak	Spacewatch	·	1.6 km	MPC · JPL
347268	2011 KZ_{29}	—	October 27, 2005	Kitt Peak	Spacewatch	·	1.2 km	MPC · JPL
347269	2011 KH_{30}	—	December 14, 2004	Kitt Peak	Spacewatch	·	2.6 km	MPC · JPL
347270	2011 KR_{30}	—	May 2, 2000	Kitt Peak	Spacewatch	V	730 m	MPC · JPL
347271	2011 KQ_{31}	—	February 12, 2002	Kitt Peak	Spacewatch	·	1.5 km	MPC · JPL
347272	2011 KG_{34}	—	March 6, 2002	Palomar	NEAT	·	1.5 km	MPC · JPL
347273	2011 KH_{37}	—	November 9, 2008	Kitt Peak	Spacewatch	·	1.2 km	MPC · JPL
347274	2011 KK_{43}	—	February 6, 2007	Mount Lemmon	Mount Lemmon Survey	·	710 m	MPC · JPL
347275	2011 LJ	—	March 17, 2004	Apache Point	SDSS	·	800 m	MPC · JPL
347276	2011 LF_{3}	—	December 3, 2005	Mauna Kea	A. Boattini	·	3.2 km	MPC · JPL
347277	2011 LN_{3}	—	November 4, 2005	Kitt Peak	Spacewatch	·	1.1 km	MPC · JPL
347278	2011 LS_{5}	—	November 7, 2008	Mount Lemmon	Mount Lemmon Survey	·	1.6 km	MPC · JPL
347279	2011 LC_{6}	—	November 30, 2005	Mount Lemmon	Mount Lemmon Survey	·	1.2 km	MPC · JPL
347280	2011 LR_{6}	—	November 7, 2005	Mauna Kea	A. Boattini	·	1.4 km	MPC · JPL
347281	2011 LU_{6}	—	October 1, 2005	Mount Lemmon	Mount Lemmon Survey	(2076)	740 m	MPC · JPL
347282	2011 LX_{11}	—	December 5, 2005	Mount Lemmon	Mount Lemmon Survey	V	790 m	MPC · JPL
347283	2011 LH_{12}	—	September 5, 2008	Kitt Peak	Spacewatch	·	1.0 km	MPC · JPL
347284	2011 LD_{18}	—	February 24, 2006	Catalina	CSS	·	2.5 km	MPC · JPL
347285	2011 LP_{21}	—	March 20, 1999	Apache Point	SDSS	·	4.4 km	MPC · JPL
347286	2011 LR_{27}	—	February 21, 2007	Mount Lemmon	Mount Lemmon Survey	NYS	1.0 km	MPC · JPL
347287	2011 MG	—	August 10, 2001	Palomar	NEAT	·	840 m	MPC · JPL
347288	2011 MU_{4}	—	December 16, 2007	Catalina	CSS	·	3.2 km	MPC · JPL
347289	2011 MV_{6}	—	May 4, 2000	Apache Point	SDSS	·	2.8 km	MPC · JPL
347290	2011 MT_{7}	—	July 21, 2002	Palomar	NEAT	GEF	1.7 km	MPC · JPL
347291	2011 MQ_{10}	—	July 3, 2000	Kitt Peak	Spacewatch	·	3.6 km	MPC · JPL
347292	2011 NB_{3}	—	October 1, 2003	Kitt Peak	Spacewatch	·	1.7 km	MPC · JPL
347293	2011 OT_{2}	—	October 25, 2008	Kitt Peak	Spacewatch	·	1.6 km	MPC · JPL
347294	2011 OF_{3}	—	August 21, 2000	Anderson Mesa	LONEOS	TIR	3.9 km	MPC · JPL
347295	2011 OM_{3}	—	February 8, 2010	WISE	WISE	·	5.4 km	MPC · JPL
347296	2011 OT_{5}	—	January 16, 2005	Kitt Peak	Spacewatch	L5	10 km	MPC · JPL
347297	2011 OW_{19}	—	September 16, 2006	Catalina	CSS	·	3.8 km	MPC · JPL
347298	2011 OZ_{20}	—	December 15, 2004	Socorro	LINEAR	·	2.5 km	MPC · JPL
347299	2011 OA_{28}	—	June 1, 2011	ESA OGS	ESA OGS	L5	10 km	MPC · JPL
347300	2011 OQ_{34}	—	December 14, 2004	Socorro	LINEAR	(5)	1.3 km	MPC · JPL

== 347301–347400 ==
back to top

Designation			Discovery			Properties		Ref
Permanent	Provisional	Named after	Date	Site	Discoverer(s)	Category	Diam.	Ref
347301	2011 OR_{35}	—	December 17, 2003	Kitt Peak	Spacewatch	PAD	2.6 km	MPC · JPL
347302	2011 OH_{51}	—	September 14, 2006	Kitt Peak	Spacewatch	THM	2.9 km	MPC · JPL
347303	2011 PS_{3}	—	July 30, 1995	Kitt Peak	Spacewatch	·	3.5 km	MPC · JPL
347304	2011 PK_{7}	—	December 20, 2007	Mount Lemmon	Mount Lemmon Survey	EOS	3.1 km	MPC · JPL
347305	2011 QT_{3}	—	October 4, 2003	Kitt Peak	Spacewatch	·	2.7 km	MPC · JPL
347306	2011 QN_{4}	—	September 19, 1995	Kitt Peak	Spacewatch	·	1.6 km	MPC · JPL
347307	2011 QW_{5}	—	October 20, 2006	Kitt Peak	Spacewatch	·	3.2 km	MPC · JPL
347308	2011 QN_{6}	—	November 17, 2007	Kitt Peak	Spacewatch	·	4.0 km	MPC · JPL
347309	2011 QQ_{10}	—	September 20, 2006	Catalina	CSS	·	3.0 km	MPC · JPL
347310	2011 QF_{17}	—	July 5, 2005	Palomar	NEAT	HYG	3.2 km	MPC · JPL
347311	2011 QF_{28}	—	February 4, 2009	Mount Lemmon	Mount Lemmon Survey	·	3.0 km	MPC · JPL
347312	2011 QL_{33}	—	November 21, 2001	Apache Point	SDSS	·	2.6 km	MPC · JPL
347313	2011 QB_{46}	—	February 1, 2006	Mount Lemmon	Mount Lemmon Survey	L5	8.5 km	MPC · JPL
347314	2011 QE_{46}	—	September 7, 2000	Kitt Peak	Spacewatch	L5	7.8 km	MPC · JPL
347315	2011 QK_{46}	—	November 11, 2001	Apache Point	SDSS	L5	9.7 km	MPC · JPL
347316	2011 QJ_{63}	—	October 17, 2001	Socorro	LINEAR	·	2.8 km	MPC · JPL
347317	2011 QX_{75}	—	September 30, 2006	Mount Lemmon	Mount Lemmon Survey	KOR	1.8 km	MPC · JPL
347318	2011 QV_{76}	—	March 4, 2005	Mount Lemmon	Mount Lemmon Survey	L5	8.8 km	MPC · JPL
347319	2011 QB_{96}	—	December 10, 2004	Socorro	LINEAR	PHO	1.7 km	MPC · JPL
347320	2011 RS_{15}	—	November 7, 2007	Kitt Peak	Spacewatch	·	2.3 km	MPC · JPL
347321	2011 SH_{6}	—	October 12, 2006	Palomar	NEAT	·	3.2 km	MPC · JPL
347322	2011 SB_{27}	—	March 15, 2004	Kitt Peak	Spacewatch	·	6.7 km	MPC · JPL
347323	2011 SM_{39}	—	March 12, 2010	WISE	WISE	CYB	4.1 km	MPC · JPL
347324	2011 SE_{72}	—	February 21, 2003	Palomar	NEAT	·	3.1 km	MPC · JPL
347325	2011 SM_{117}	—	March 12, 2003	Kitt Peak	Spacewatch	·	2.8 km	MPC · JPL
347326	2011 SZ_{178}	—	March 17, 2009	Kitt Peak	Spacewatch	·	5.5 km	MPC · JPL
347327	2011 SV_{196}	—	November 14, 2006	Mount Lemmon	Mount Lemmon Survey	HYG	3.2 km	MPC · JPL
347328	2011 SC_{218}	—	May 14, 2004	Kitt Peak	Spacewatch	EOS	2.0 km	MPC · JPL
347329	2011 SZ_{263}	—	September 30, 2006	Mount Lemmon	Mount Lemmon Survey	·	3.5 km	MPC · JPL
347330	2011 SV_{266}	—	March 18, 2007	Kitt Peak	Spacewatch	L5	9.0 km	MPC · JPL
347331	2011 UE_{121}	—	September 11, 2005	Kitt Peak	Spacewatch	·	3.7 km	MPC · JPL
347332	2011 UK_{295}	—	October 28, 2006	Kitt Peak	Spacewatch	·	4.2 km	MPC · JPL
347333	2012 BV_{19}	—	November 13, 2005	Palomar	NEAT	EUP	4.1 km	MPC · JPL
347334	2012 MV_{5}	—	November 23, 2009	Mount Lemmon	Mount Lemmon Survey	·	4.6 km	MPC · JPL
347335	2012 NF_{1}	—	August 24, 2001	Socorro	LINEAR	·	2.7 km	MPC · JPL
347336 Changmeemann	2012 NN_{1}	Changmeemann	August 18, 2007	XuYi	PMO NEO Survey Program	EOS	2.8 km	MPC · JPL
347337	2012 OR_{5}	—	March 9, 2006	Kitt Peak	Spacewatch	H	680 m	MPC · JPL
347338	2012 OC_{6}	—	March 20, 2007	Mount Lemmon	Mount Lemmon Survey	·	3.1 km	MPC · JPL
347339	2012 PN_{12}	—	March 2, 2006	Kitt Peak	Spacewatch	·	2.0 km	MPC · JPL
347340	2012 PM_{16}	—	December 27, 2006	Mount Lemmon	Mount Lemmon Survey	·	1.6 km	MPC · JPL
347341	2012 PF_{18}	—	February 7, 2002	Socorro	LINEAR	·	1.9 km	MPC · JPL
347342	2012 PC_{31}	—	January 17, 2010	Kitt Peak	Spacewatch	·	1.6 km	MPC · JPL
347343	2012 PK_{31}	—	December 1, 2005	Kitt Peak	Spacewatch	·	1.9 km	MPC · JPL
347344	2012 PW_{36}	—	March 19, 2001	Kitt Peak	Spacewatch	·	2.2 km	MPC · JPL
347345	2012 QQ_{9}	—	December 2, 2005	Mount Lemmon	Mount Lemmon Survey	MAS	740 m	MPC · JPL
347346	2012 QD_{13}	—	September 22, 1995	Kitt Peak	Spacewatch	·	3.5 km	MPC · JPL
347347	2012 QV_{16}	—	May 29, 2008	Mount Lemmon	Mount Lemmon Survey	·	1.3 km	MPC · JPL
347348	2012 QM_{20}	—	September 5, 2007	Catalina	CSS	BRA	1.8 km	MPC · JPL
347349	2012 QP_{20}	—	January 15, 2004	Kitt Peak	Spacewatch	·	690 m	MPC · JPL
347350	2012 QK_{21}	—	May 31, 2008	Mount Lemmon	Mount Lemmon Survey	·	1.7 km	MPC · JPL
347351	2012 QW_{22}	—	September 28, 2003	Kitt Peak	Spacewatch	·	2.6 km	MPC · JPL
347352	2012 QX_{22}	—	September 21, 2001	Kitt Peak	Spacewatch	·	3.7 km	MPC · JPL
347353	2012 QX_{24}	—	November 4, 2005	Mount Lemmon	Mount Lemmon Survey	·	1.7 km	MPC · JPL
347354	2012 QU_{29}	—	January 9, 2006	Kitt Peak	Spacewatch	MAS	750 m	MPC · JPL
347355	2012 QV_{33}	—	April 16, 2007	Mount Lemmon	Mount Lemmon Survey	·	1.4 km	MPC · JPL
347356	2012 QK_{35}	—	February 7, 2000	Kitt Peak	Spacewatch	·	1.6 km	MPC · JPL
347357	2012 QQ_{36}	—	December 21, 2005	Kitt Peak	Spacewatch	MAS	900 m	MPC · JPL
347358	2012 QR_{40}	—	February 1, 2003	Palomar	NEAT	·	5.4 km	MPC · JPL
347359	2012 QF_{41}	—	December 1, 2005	Mount Lemmon	Mount Lemmon Survey	MAS	900 m	MPC · JPL
347360	2012 QU_{41}	—	October 24, 2008	Catalina	CSS	·	2.6 km	MPC · JPL
347361	2012 QV_{41}	—	October 16, 1977	Palomar	C. J. van Houten, I. van Houten-Groeneveld, T. Gehrels	·	1.1 km	MPC · JPL
347362	2012 QB_{42}	—	July 9, 2002	Palomar	NEAT	·	5.3 km	MPC · JPL
347363	2012 QR_{51}	—	October 15, 1995	Kitt Peak	Spacewatch	JUN	1.1 km	MPC · JPL
347364	2012 RQ_{1}	—	September 5, 2002	Socorro	LINEAR	·	810 m	MPC · JPL
347365	2012 RK_{3}	—	March 15, 2004	Socorro	LINEAR	·	1.3 km	MPC · JPL
347366	2012 RL_{4}	—	July 26, 2001	Kitt Peak	Spacewatch	·	960 m	MPC · JPL
347367	2012 RS_{4}	—	September 30, 2005	Kitt Peak	Spacewatch	NYS	690 m	MPC · JPL
347368	2012 RD_{6}	—	August 16, 2006	Siding Spring	SSS	LIX	4.2 km	MPC · JPL
347369	2012 RK_{6}	—	October 22, 2005	Kitt Peak	Spacewatch	NYS	1.2 km	MPC · JPL
347370	2012 RU_{6}	—	September 6, 2008	Catalina	CSS	NYS	1.3 km	MPC · JPL
347371	2012 RL_{7}	—	August 23, 2001	Anderson Mesa	LONEOS	·	1.1 km	MPC · JPL
347372	2012 RQ_{8}	—	October 14, 2001	Socorro	LINEAR	·	3.8 km	MPC · JPL
347373	2012 RZ_{8}	—	July 29, 2008	Mount Lemmon	Mount Lemmon Survey	EUN	2.1 km	MPC · JPL
347374	2012 RM_{10}	—	February 14, 2000	Kitt Peak	Spacewatch	·	2.2 km	MPC · JPL
347375	2012 RL_{12}	—	October 9, 1996	Prescott	P. G. Comba	·	810 m	MPC · JPL
347376	2012 RU_{12}	—	January 9, 2006	Kitt Peak	Spacewatch	·	1.8 km	MPC · JPL
347377	2012 RH_{14}	—	October 4, 2002	Socorro	LINEAR	·	910 m	MPC · JPL
347378	2012 RM_{14}	—	August 15, 2006	Palomar	NEAT	·	3.7 km	MPC · JPL
347379	2012 RV_{17}	—	April 29, 2008	Mount Lemmon	Mount Lemmon Survey	·	900 m	MPC · JPL
347380	2012 RX_{17}	—	September 26, 2003	Desert Eagle	W. K. Y. Yeung	·	2.3 km	MPC · JPL
347381	2012 RG_{19}	—	February 23, 2007	Mount Lemmon	Mount Lemmon Survey	NYS	1.6 km	MPC · JPL
347382	2012 RS_{19}	—	November 19, 2009	Kitt Peak	Spacewatch	(2076)	740 m	MPC · JPL
347383	2012 RB_{21}	—	January 8, 2005	Campo Imperatore	CINEOS	MRX	1.2 km	MPC · JPL
347384	2012 RB_{24}	—	November 29, 2003	Kitt Peak	Spacewatch	AGN	1.5 km	MPC · JPL
347385	2012 RO_{24}	—	September 14, 2006	Catalina	CSS	·	4.7 km	MPC · JPL
347386	2012 RO_{25}	—	December 29, 2003	Kitt Peak	Spacewatch	·	1.8 km	MPC · JPL
347387	2012 RL_{29}	—	October 23, 2001	Socorro	LINEAR	·	1.4 km	MPC · JPL
347388	2012 RF_{34}	—	October 4, 2002	Campo Imperatore	CINEOS	·	1.9 km	MPC · JPL
347389	2012 RH_{34}	—	December 16, 1999	Kitt Peak	Spacewatch	·	2.1 km	MPC · JPL
347390	2012 RV_{34}	—	October 24, 2003	Kitt Peak	Spacewatch	HOF	2.8 km	MPC · JPL
347391	2012 RL_{35}	—	November 29, 2005	Mount Lemmon	Mount Lemmon Survey	·	1.3 km	MPC · JPL
347392	2012 RP_{35}	—	August 19, 2006	Kitt Peak	Spacewatch	·	2.8 km	MPC · JPL
347393	2012 RR_{41}	—	February 26, 2004	Kitt Peak	Deep Ecliptic Survey	·	2.3 km	MPC · JPL
347394	2012 SK_{1}	—	January 7, 2006	Mount Lemmon	Mount Lemmon Survey	fast	1.2 km	MPC · JPL
347395	2012 SQ_{4}	—	February 23, 2007	Mount Lemmon	Mount Lemmon Survey	·	1.5 km	MPC · JPL
347396	2012 SZ_{5}	—	August 31, 2005	Kitt Peak	Spacewatch	·	1.9 km	MPC · JPL
347397	2012 SD_{6}	—	October 11, 2001	Palomar	NEAT	THM	2.5 km	MPC · JPL
347398	2012 SW_{8}	—	October 1, 2008	Kitt Peak	Spacewatch	·	1.6 km	MPC · JPL
347399	2012 SR_{11}	—	January 15, 2005	Kitt Peak	Spacewatch	·	2.3 km	MPC · JPL
347400	2012 SW_{11}	—	August 14, 2001	Haleakala	NEAT	·	1.0 km	MPC · JPL

== 347401–347500 ==
back to top

Designation			Discovery			Properties		Ref
Permanent	Provisional	Named after	Date	Site	Discoverer(s)	Category	Diam.	Ref
347401	2012 SB_{13}	—	October 16, 2007	Mount Lemmon	Mount Lemmon Survey	·	3.8 km	MPC · JPL
347402	2012 SG_{15}	—	August 25, 1995	Kitt Peak	Spacewatch	·	3.7 km	MPC · JPL
347403	2012 SN_{17}	—	September 19, 2003	Kitt Peak	Spacewatch	(12739)	1.6 km	MPC · JPL
347404	2012 SU_{20}	—	November 16, 2003	Kitt Peak	Spacewatch	·	2.7 km	MPC · JPL
347405	2012 SM_{22}	—	November 9, 1999	Kitt Peak	Spacewatch	·	2.0 km	MPC · JPL
347406	2012 SX_{27}	—	September 24, 2008	Mount Lemmon	Mount Lemmon Survey	·	1.2 km	MPC · JPL
347407	2012 SF_{30}	—	January 31, 2006	Kitt Peak	Spacewatch	L5	9.3 km	MPC · JPL
347408	2012 SJ_{31}	—	March 9, 2007	Mount Lemmon	Mount Lemmon Survey	·	1.2 km	MPC · JPL
347409	2012 SL_{31}	—	September 19, 2001	Socorro	LINEAR	·	2.6 km	MPC · JPL
347410	2012 SO_{31}	—	September 27, 2008	Mount Lemmon	Mount Lemmon Survey	(5)	1.2 km	MPC · JPL
347411	2012 SV_{32}	—	January 30, 2004	Kitt Peak	Spacewatch	·	660 m	MPC · JPL
347412	2012 SJ_{34}	—	April 11, 2005	Mount Lemmon	Mount Lemmon Survey	EOS	1.7 km	MPC · JPL
347413	2012 SA_{37}	—	September 11, 2004	Kitt Peak	Spacewatch	3:2 · SHU	6.8 km	MPC · JPL
347414	2012 SS_{38}	—	August 29, 2006	Kitt Peak	Spacewatch	·	4.6 km	MPC · JPL
347415	2012 SU_{40}	—	September 13, 2007	Mount Lemmon	Mount Lemmon Survey	·	2.8 km	MPC · JPL
347416	2012 SV_{40}	—	October 24, 2001	Kitt Peak	Spacewatch	·	3.3 km	MPC · JPL
347417	2012 SR_{44}	—	November 19, 2003	Catalina	CSS	·	2.7 km	MPC · JPL
347418	2012 ST_{44}	—	October 14, 2001	Kitt Peak	Spacewatch	·	3.3 km	MPC · JPL
347419	2012 SL_{48}	—	September 13, 2007	Mount Lemmon	Mount Lemmon Survey	·	2.7 km	MPC · JPL
347420	2012 SD_{49}	—	December 12, 1998	Kitt Peak	Spacewatch	KOR	1.8 km	MPC · JPL
347421	2012 ST_{57}	—	July 27, 2005	Palomar	NEAT	·	830 m	MPC · JPL
347422	2012 SW_{58}	—	August 17, 2006	Palomar	NEAT	·	3.9 km	MPC · JPL
347423	2012 SV_{60}	—	April 2, 2005	Kitt Peak	Spacewatch	·	3.3 km	MPC · JPL
347424	2012 TX	—	February 9, 2005	Mount Lemmon	Mount Lemmon Survey	HOF	3.4 km	MPC · JPL
347425	2012 TX_{2}	—	September 25, 1998	Apache Point	SDSS	·	3.5 km	MPC · JPL
347426	2012 TZ_{2}	—	May 16, 2005	Mount Lemmon	Mount Lemmon Survey	·	920 m	MPC · JPL
347427	2012 TE_{11}	—	April 5, 2000	Socorro	LINEAR	ERI	2.1 km	MPC · JPL
347428	2012 TV_{13}	—	September 7, 2008	Catalina	CSS	V	890 m	MPC · JPL
347429	2012 TS_{19}	—	September 18, 2001	Anderson Mesa	LONEOS	V	730 m	MPC · JPL
347430	2012 TN_{21}	—	September 23, 2008	Mount Lemmon	Mount Lemmon Survey	·	1.3 km	MPC · JPL
347431	2012 TZ_{21}	—	February 13, 2004	Kitt Peak	Spacewatch	·	3.0 km	MPC · JPL
347432	2012 TP_{22}	—	October 14, 2001	Kitt Peak	Spacewatch	·	5.0 km	MPC · JPL
347433	2012 TL_{33}	—	September 18, 2003	Palomar	NEAT	·	1.7 km	MPC · JPL
347434	2012 TC_{37}	—	April 18, 2006	Kitt Peak	Spacewatch	·	2.1 km	MPC · JPL
347435	2012 TS_{88}	—	October 18, 2001	Palomar	NEAT	·	3.5 km	MPC · JPL
347436	2012 TR_{109}	—	October 21, 2007	Mount Lemmon	Mount Lemmon Survey	EOS	2.7 km	MPC · JPL
347437	2012 TP_{113}	—	August 29, 2006	Kitt Peak	Spacewatch	·	2.5 km	MPC · JPL
347438	2012 TA_{156}	—	February 7, 2006	Kitt Peak	Spacewatch	·	1.5 km	MPC · JPL
347439	2012 TK_{165}	—	March 23, 2006	Catalina	CSS	EUN	1.4 km	MPC · JPL
347440	2012 TG_{173}	—	October 28, 2005	Catalina	CSS	·	1.2 km	MPC · JPL
347441	2012 TK_{174}	—	September 19, 2003	Kitt Peak	Spacewatch	NEM	2.5 km	MPC · JPL
347442	2012 TZ_{188}	—	February 1, 2005	Kitt Peak	Spacewatch	AST	1.9 km	MPC · JPL
347443	2012 TE_{189}	—	September 20, 2001	Kitt Peak	Spacewatch	·	2.7 km	MPC · JPL
347444	2012 TJ_{189}	—	October 31, 1999	Kitt Peak	Spacewatch	·	1.4 km	MPC · JPL
347445	2012 TU_{216}	—	March 9, 2005	Mount Lemmon	Mount Lemmon Survey	·	1.9 km	MPC · JPL
347446	2012 TF_{231}	—	December 19, 2004	Mount Lemmon	Mount Lemmon Survey	L5	20 km	MPC · JPL
347447	2012 TC_{232}	—	November 10, 2005	Mount Lemmon	Mount Lemmon Survey	·	1.7 km	MPC · JPL
347448	2012 TF_{232}	—	December 5, 2005	Kitt Peak	Spacewatch	·	1.4 km	MPC · JPL
347449	2012 TW_{236}	—	April 23, 1998	Socorro	LINEAR	T_{j} (2.61) · unusual	20 km	MPC · JPL
347450	2012 TH_{241}	—	October 18, 2003	Kitt Peak	Spacewatch	·	2.8 km	MPC · JPL
347451	2012 TW_{241}	—	September 19, 2007	Kitt Peak	Spacewatch	KOR	1.6 km	MPC · JPL
347452	2012 TL_{242}	—	April 9, 2008	Kitt Peak	Spacewatch	L5	5.4 km	MPC · JPL
347453	2012 TS_{242}	—	August 21, 2006	Kitt Peak	Spacewatch	·	3.2 km	MPC · JPL
347454	2012 TT_{242}	—	October 8, 2007	Mount Lemmon	Mount Lemmon Survey	·	2.0 km	MPC · JPL
347455	2012 TE_{258}	—	February 23, 2007	Kitt Peak	Spacewatch	L5	10 km	MPC · JPL
347456	2012 TE_{259}	—	September 10, 2007	Kitt Peak	Spacewatch	KOR	1.7 km	MPC · JPL
347457	2012 TU_{262}	—	September 11, 2001	Kitt Peak	Spacewatch	THM	1.9 km	MPC · JPL
347458	2012 TV_{262}	—	April 11, 2004	Palomar	NEAT	·	5.5 km	MPC · JPL
347459	2012 TP_{298}	—	September 19, 2001	Socorro	LINEAR	·	910 m	MPC · JPL
347460	2012 TA_{301}	—	April 15, 2008	Kitt Peak	Spacewatch	·	760 m	MPC · JPL
347461	2012 TW_{302}	—	April 2, 2006	Kitt Peak	Spacewatch	·	1.8 km	MPC · JPL
347462	2012 TY_{308}	—	October 6, 2004	Kitt Peak	Spacewatch	EUN	960 m	MPC · JPL
347463	2012 TR_{309}	—	August 19, 2008	Siding Spring	SSS	·	1.4 km	MPC · JPL
347464	2012 TF_{312}	—	November 27, 1999	Anderson Mesa	LONEOS	(1547)	3.1 km	MPC · JPL
347465	2012 TV_{312}	—	March 18, 1998	Kitt Peak	Spacewatch	·	2.0 km	MPC · JPL
347466	2012 TZ_{313}	—	September 28, 2005	Palomar	NEAT	·	720 m	MPC · JPL
347467	2012 TD_{314}	—	February 27, 2006	Kitt Peak	Spacewatch	·	1.8 km	MPC · JPL
347468	2012 TU_{314}	—	December 14, 2004	Kitt Peak	Spacewatch	(5)	2.0 km	MPC · JPL
347469	2012 TG_{315}	—	February 23, 2003	Anderson Mesa	LONEOS	·	5.0 km	MPC · JPL
347470	2012 TS_{316}	—	December 18, 2001	Palomar	NEAT	·	1.8 km	MPC · JPL
347471	2012 UW_{1}	—	November 2, 2008	Mount Lemmon	Mount Lemmon Survey	·	1.9 km	MPC · JPL
347472	2012 UD_{3}	—	December 1, 1994	Kitt Peak	Spacewatch	·	1.2 km	MPC · JPL
347473	2012 UZ_{3}	—	October 9, 2007	Mount Lemmon	Mount Lemmon Survey	KOR	1.9 km	MPC · JPL
347474	2012 UG_{10}	—	April 26, 2006	Kitt Peak	Spacewatch	·	1.9 km	MPC · JPL
347475	2012 UQ_{14}	—	September 16, 2006	Kitt Peak	Spacewatch	HYG	3.3 km	MPC · JPL
347476	2012 UV_{29}	—	October 3, 1999	Kitt Peak	Spacewatch	·	2.8 km	MPC · JPL
347477	2012 UZ_{131}	—	September 30, 1995	Kitt Peak	Spacewatch	·	720 m	MPC · JPL
347478	2012 UX_{133}	—	October 29, 2005	Catalina	CSS	·	1.3 km	MPC · JPL
347479	2012 UR_{134}	—	July 23, 2003	Palomar	NEAT	·	2.0 km	MPC · JPL
347480	3291 T-2	—	September 30, 1973	Palomar	C. J. van Houten, I. van Houten-Groeneveld, T. Gehrels	·	1 km	MPC · JPL
347481	1174 T-3	—	October 17, 1977	Palomar	C. J. van Houten, I. van Houten-Groeneveld, T. Gehrels	·	2.8 km	MPC · JPL
347482	1993 FQ_{19}	—	March 17, 1993	La Silla	UESAC	·	2.8 km	MPC · JPL
347483	1993 TZ_{10}	—	October 15, 1993	Kitt Peak	Spacewatch	NYS	1.1 km	MPC · JPL
347484	1994 SW_{5}	—	September 28, 1994	Kitt Peak	Spacewatch	·	3.5 km	MPC · JPL
347485	1994 UT_{5}	—	October 28, 1994	Kitt Peak	Spacewatch	·	1.6 km	MPC · JPL
347486	1995 HD_{3}	—	April 26, 1995	Kitt Peak	Spacewatch	NYS	1.3 km	MPC · JPL
347487	1995 MC_{7}	—	June 29, 1995	Kitt Peak	Spacewatch	·	1.6 km	MPC · JPL
347488	1995 OO_{8}	—	July 25, 1995	Kitt Peak	Spacewatch	·	1.1 km	MPC · JPL
347489	1995 TS_{3}	—	October 15, 1995	Kitt Peak	Spacewatch	·	1.5 km	MPC · JPL
347490	1995 TG_{9}	—	October 1, 1995	Kitt Peak	Spacewatch	·	1.6 km	MPC · JPL
347491	1995 WV_{9}	—	November 16, 1995	Kitt Peak	Spacewatch	(5)	1.3 km	MPC · JPL
347492	1996 AT_{13}	—	January 15, 1996	Kitt Peak	Spacewatch	·	710 m	MPC · JPL
347493	1996 VP_{9}	—	November 3, 1996	Kitt Peak	Spacewatch	·	1.9 km	MPC · JPL
347494	1996 VW_{27}	—	November 11, 1996	Kitt Peak	Spacewatch	·	1.9 km	MPC · JPL
347495	1998 QP_{2}	—	August 20, 1998	Kitt Peak	Spacewatch	·	1.7 km	MPC · JPL
347496	1998 QG_{58}	—	August 30, 1998	Kitt Peak	Spacewatch	·	2.1 km	MPC · JPL
347497	1998 QR_{109}	—	August 21, 1998	Haleakala	NEAT	·	3.0 km	MPC · JPL
347498	1998 RE_{68}	—	September 14, 1998	Socorro	LINEAR	·	2.2 km	MPC · JPL
347499	1998 SV_{2}	—	September 19, 1998	Catalina	CSS	·	1.3 km	MPC · JPL
347500	1998 SQ_{40}	—	September 24, 1998	Kitt Peak	Spacewatch	·	1.5 km	MPC · JPL

== 347501–347600 ==
back to top

Designation			Discovery			Properties		Ref
Permanent	Provisional	Named after	Date	Site	Discoverer(s)	Category	Diam.	Ref
347501	1998 SH_{50}	—	September 25, 1998	Kitt Peak	Spacewatch	·	2.5 km	MPC · JPL
347502	1998 UG_{9}	—	October 16, 1998	Kitt Peak	Spacewatch	·	700 m	MPC · JPL
347503	1998 XT_{16}	—	December 15, 1998	Višnjan	K. Korlević	·	3.1 km	MPC · JPL
347504	1999 AF_{32}	—	January 15, 1999	Kitt Peak	Spacewatch	V	760 m	MPC · JPL
347505	1999 CM_{4}	—	February 11, 1999	Socorro	LINEAR	·	1.5 km	MPC · JPL
347506	1999 GU_{62}	—	April 12, 1999	Kitt Peak	Spacewatch	·	1.5 km	MPC · JPL
347507	1999 KN_{2}	—	May 16, 1999	Kitt Peak	Spacewatch	·	1.2 km	MPC · JPL
347508	1999 RJ_{25}	—	September 7, 1999	Socorro	LINEAR	RAF	1.6 km	MPC · JPL
347509	1999 RA_{104}	—	September 8, 1999	Socorro	LINEAR	·	690 m	MPC · JPL
347510	1999 RV_{154}	—	September 9, 1999	Socorro	LINEAR	·	700 m	MPC · JPL
347511	1999 RV_{189}	—	September 9, 1999	Socorro	LINEAR	·	2.6 km	MPC · JPL
347512	1999 RJ_{203}	—	September 8, 1999	Socorro	LINEAR	MAR	1.5 km	MPC · JPL
347513	1999 RA_{226}	—	September 4, 1999	Catalina	CSS	EUN	1.7 km	MPC · JPL
347514	1999 SP_{14}	—	September 29, 1999	Catalina	CSS	·	1.4 km	MPC · JPL
347515	1999 TS_{7}	—	October 2, 1999	Socorro	LINEAR	·	2.8 km	MPC · JPL
347516	1999 TT_{30}	—	October 4, 1999	Socorro	LINEAR	·	1.7 km	MPC · JPL
347517	1999 TR_{51}	—	October 4, 1999	Kitt Peak	Spacewatch	EUN ·	2.8 km	MPC · JPL
347518	1999 TJ_{62}	—	October 7, 1999	Kitt Peak	Spacewatch	·	1.3 km	MPC · JPL
347519	1999 TP_{65}	—	October 1, 1999	Kitt Peak	Spacewatch	·	980 m	MPC · JPL
347520	1999 TQ_{69}	—	October 6, 1999	Socorro	LINEAR	·	600 m	MPC · JPL
347521	1999 TZ_{108}	—	October 4, 1999	Socorro	LINEAR	·	1.9 km	MPC · JPL
347522	1999 TN_{139}	—	October 6, 1999	Socorro	LINEAR	(5)	1.4 km	MPC · JPL
347523	1999 TU_{141}	—	October 7, 1999	Socorro	LINEAR	·	1.6 km	MPC · JPL
347524	1999 TK_{210}	—	October 14, 1999	Socorro	LINEAR	·	4.4 km	MPC · JPL
347525	1999 TG_{217}	—	October 15, 1999	Socorro	LINEAR	T_{j} (2.98)	4.1 km	MPC · JPL
347526	1999 TT_{289}	—	October 10, 1999	Socorro	LINEAR	(5)	1.4 km	MPC · JPL
347527	1999 UQ_{18}	—	October 30, 1999	Kitt Peak	Spacewatch	(5)	1.3 km	MPC · JPL
347528	1999 UR_{50}	—	October 30, 1999	Catalina	CSS	·	1.7 km	MPC · JPL
347529	1999 VJ_{36}	—	November 3, 1999	Socorro	LINEAR	(1547)	2.6 km	MPC · JPL
347530	1999 VF_{52}	—	November 3, 1999	Socorro	LINEAR	JUN	1.3 km	MPC · JPL
347531	1999 VN_{116}	—	November 4, 1999	Kitt Peak	Spacewatch	·	1.0 km	MPC · JPL
347532	1999 WO_{5}	—	November 28, 1999	Kitt Peak	Spacewatch	·	1.7 km	MPC · JPL
347533	1999 XA_{17}	—	December 7, 1999	Socorro	LINEAR	·	2.5 km	MPC · JPL
347534	1999 XN_{142}	—	December 12, 1999	Socorro	LINEAR	H	820 m	MPC · JPL
347535	1999 XH_{189}	—	December 12, 1999	Socorro	LINEAR	·	2.3 km	MPC · JPL
347536	1999 XB_{258}	—	December 8, 1999	Kitt Peak	Spacewatch	·	2.1 km	MPC · JPL
347537	1999 YY_{13}	—	December 31, 1999	San Marcello	L. Tesi, G. Forti	·	3.5 km	MPC · JPL
347538	2000 AP_{1}	—	January 2, 2000	Socorro	LINEAR	·	1.0 km	MPC · JPL
347539	2000 AQ_{24}	—	January 3, 2000	Socorro	LINEAR	·	1.9 km	MPC · JPL
347540	2000 AS_{42}	—	December 15, 1999	Socorro	LINEAR	H	650 m	MPC · JPL
347541	2000 AF_{44}	—	January 5, 2000	Kitt Peak	Spacewatch	MAR	1.1 km	MPC · JPL
347542	2000 AV_{152}	—	January 8, 2000	Socorro	LINEAR	H	800 m	MPC · JPL
347543	2000 BN_{6}	—	January 29, 2000	Socorro	LINEAR	H	710 m	MPC · JPL
347544	2000 EJ_{7}	—	March 3, 2000	Kitt Peak	Spacewatch	·	660 m	MPC · JPL
347545	2000 EB_{36}	—	March 3, 2000	Socorro	LINEAR	·	1.9 km	MPC · JPL
347546	2000 EE_{132}	—	March 11, 2000	Socorro	LINEAR	MRX	1.2 km	MPC · JPL
347547	2000 OL_{1}	—	July 24, 2000	Kitt Peak	Spacewatch	·	980 m	MPC · JPL
347548	2000 QA_{50}	—	August 24, 2000	Socorro	LINEAR	·	1.2 km	MPC · JPL
347549	2000 SW_{5}	—	September 22, 2000	Socorro	LINEAR	·	4.8 km	MPC · JPL
347550	2000 SA_{126}	—	September 24, 2000	Socorro	LINEAR	·	1.5 km	MPC · JPL
347551	2000 SG_{220}	—	September 26, 2000	Socorro	LINEAR	·	2.0 km	MPC · JPL
347552	2000 SB_{302}	—	September 28, 2000	Socorro	LINEAR	·	1.3 km	MPC · JPL
347553	2000 SS_{312}	—	September 27, 2000	Socorro	LINEAR	PHO	1.6 km	MPC · JPL
347554	2000 ST_{325}	—	September 29, 2000	Kitt Peak	Spacewatch	·	1.8 km	MPC · JPL
347555	2000 SL_{367}	—	September 22, 2000	Haleakala	NEAT	·	1.8 km	MPC · JPL
347556	2000 TP_{20}	—	August 31, 2000	Socorro	LINEAR	JUN	1.4 km	MPC · JPL
347557	2000 TW_{54}	—	October 1, 2000	Socorro	LINEAR	·	2.4 km	MPC · JPL
347558	2000 UP_{18}	—	October 25, 2000	Socorro	LINEAR	·	1.4 km	MPC · JPL
347559	2000 UT_{24}	—	October 24, 2000	Socorro	LINEAR	·	1.9 km	MPC · JPL
347560	2000 UW_{24}	—	October 24, 2000	Socorro	LINEAR	V	1.0 km	MPC · JPL
347561	2000 UN_{64}	—	October 25, 2000	Socorro	LINEAR	SUL	2.7 km	MPC · JPL
347562	2000 UO_{95}	—	October 25, 2000	Socorro	LINEAR	·	2.5 km	MPC · JPL
347563	2000 UX_{101}	—	October 25, 2000	Socorro	LINEAR	V	1.1 km	MPC · JPL
347564	2000 UF_{111}	—	October 26, 2000	Kitt Peak	Spacewatch	·	1.6 km	MPC · JPL
347565	2000 VX	—	November 1, 2000	Kitt Peak	Spacewatch	VER	3.2 km	MPC · JPL
347566	2000 VS_{1}	—	November 1, 2000	Socorro	LINEAR	·	1.7 km	MPC · JPL
347567	2000 WQ_{28}	—	November 25, 2000	Socorro	LINEAR	·	1.6 km	MPC · JPL
347568	2000 WA_{119}	—	November 20, 2000	Socorro	LINEAR	·	1.9 km	MPC · JPL
347569	2000 WK_{130}	—	November 19, 2000	Kitt Peak	Spacewatch	·	2.5 km	MPC · JPL
347570	2000 XN_{55}	—	December 5, 2000	Socorro	LINEAR	·	2.2 km	MPC · JPL
347571	2000 YZ_{53}	—	December 30, 2000	Socorro	LINEAR	·	1.7 km	MPC · JPL
347572	2000 YZ_{55}	—	December 30, 2000	Socorro	LINEAR	(10369)	2.7 km	MPC · JPL
347573	2000 YB_{59}	—	December 30, 2000	Socorro	LINEAR	·	1.6 km	MPC · JPL
347574	2000 YL_{113}	—	December 30, 2000	Socorro	LINEAR	EUN	1.7 km	MPC · JPL
347575	2001 AC_{6}	—	January 2, 2001	Socorro	LINEAR	·	1.6 km	MPC · JPL
347576	2001 AP_{28}	—	January 5, 2001	Socorro	LINEAR	·	2.1 km	MPC · JPL
347577	2001 AE_{47}	—	January 15, 2001	Socorro	LINEAR	·	3.1 km	MPC · JPL
347578	2001 AY_{49}	—	December 22, 2000	Kitt Peak	Spacewatch	L4	10 km	MPC · JPL
347579	2001 BZ_{10}	—	January 16, 2001	Bohyunsan	Bohyunsan	·	1.4 km	MPC · JPL
347580	2001 CM_{9}	—	February 1, 2001	Socorro	LINEAR	·	1.8 km	MPC · JPL
347581	2001 CK_{13}	—	February 1, 2001	Socorro	LINEAR	·	2.0 km	MPC · JPL
347582	2001 CT_{49}	—	February 3, 2001	Socorro	LINEAR	·	1.6 km	MPC · JPL
347583	2001 DZ_{61}	—	February 19, 2001	Socorro	LINEAR	·	1.8 km	MPC · JPL
347584	2001 EH_{18}	—	March 15, 2001	Socorro	LINEAR	·	2.3 km	MPC · JPL
347585	2001 FE_{89}	—	March 27, 2001	Kitt Peak	Spacewatch	·	1.2 km	MPC · JPL
347586	2001 FK_{92}	—	March 16, 2001	Socorro	LINEAR	(5)	1.9 km	MPC · JPL
347587	2001 FW_{94}	—	March 16, 2001	Socorro	LINEAR	PHO	1.1 km	MPC · JPL
347588	2001 FN_{145}	—	March 24, 2001	Kitt Peak	Spacewatch	·	1.7 km	MPC · JPL
347589	2001 GP_{5}	—	April 15, 2001	Haleakala	NEAT	·	2.3 km	MPC · JPL
347590	2001 NS_{5}	—	July 13, 2001	Palomar	NEAT	·	780 m	MPC · JPL
347591	2001 OJ	—	July 16, 2001	Haleakala	NEAT	·	950 m	MPC · JPL
347592	2001 PU_{19}	—	August 10, 2001	Palomar	NEAT	·	970 m	MPC · JPL
347593	2001 PX_{21}	—	August 10, 2001	Haleakala	NEAT	PHO	1.3 km	MPC · JPL
347594	2001 PP_{57}	—	August 14, 2001	Haleakala	NEAT	V	810 m	MPC · JPL
347595	2001 QL_{35}	—	August 16, 2001	Socorro	LINEAR	(5)	1.6 km	MPC · JPL
347596	2001 QB_{59}	—	August 17, 2001	Socorro	LINEAR	·	980 m	MPC · JPL
347597	2001 QF_{188}	—	August 21, 2001	Haleakala	NEAT	·	1.4 km	MPC · JPL
347598	2001 QM_{211}	—	August 23, 2001	Anderson Mesa	LONEOS	·	980 m	MPC · JPL
347599	2001 QM_{222}	—	August 24, 2001	Anderson Mesa	LONEOS	ADE	2.1 km	MPC · JPL
347600	2001 QQ_{241}	—	August 24, 2001	Socorro	LINEAR	·	1.1 km	MPC · JPL

== 347601–347700 ==
back to top

Designation			Discovery			Properties		Ref
Permanent	Provisional	Named after	Date	Site	Discoverer(s)	Category	Diam.	Ref
347601	2001 QY_{278}	—	August 19, 2001	Socorro	LINEAR	·	940 m	MPC · JPL
347602	2001 RN_{28}	—	September 7, 2001	Socorro	LINEAR	·	1.9 km	MPC · JPL
347603	2001 RY_{41}	—	September 11, 2001	Socorro	LINEAR	·	1 km	MPC · JPL
347604	2001 RX_{49}	—	September 10, 2001	Socorro	LINEAR	·	3.3 km	MPC · JPL
347605	2001 RK_{61}	—	September 12, 2001	Socorro	LINEAR	·	1.0 km	MPC · JPL
347606	2001 RR_{65}	—	September 10, 2001	Socorro	LINEAR	JUN	3.3 km	MPC · JPL
347607	2001 RL_{101}	—	September 12, 2001	Socorro	LINEAR	·	2.6 km	MPC · JPL
347608	2001 RD_{105}	—	September 12, 2001	Socorro	LINEAR	MAS	720 m	MPC · JPL
347609	2001 RO_{105}	—	September 12, 2001	Socorro	LINEAR	·	780 m	MPC · JPL
347610	2001 RF_{119}	—	August 12, 2001	Palomar	NEAT	·	2.4 km	MPC · JPL
347611	2001 RZ_{121}	—	August 24, 2001	Socorro	LINEAR	·	1.0 km	MPC · JPL
347612	2001 RP_{135}	—	September 12, 2001	Socorro	LINEAR	·	2.3 km	MPC · JPL
347613	2001 RJ_{150}	—	September 11, 2001	Anderson Mesa	LONEOS	·	810 m	MPC · JPL
347614	2001 SH_{13}	—	September 16, 2001	Socorro	LINEAR	·	890 m	MPC · JPL
347615	2001 ST_{13}	—	September 16, 2001	Socorro	LINEAR	·	3.0 km	MPC · JPL
347616	2001 SB_{15}	—	September 16, 2001	Socorro	LINEAR	·	970 m	MPC · JPL
347617	2001 SZ_{37}	—	August 5, 2001	Palomar	NEAT	·	3.0 km	MPC · JPL
347618	2001 SJ_{51}	—	September 16, 2001	Socorro	LINEAR	·	940 m	MPC · JPL
347619	2001 SA_{78}	—	September 19, 2001	Socorro	LINEAR	·	1.1 km	MPC · JPL
347620	2001 SS_{95}	—	September 20, 2001	Socorro	LINEAR	·	1.1 km	MPC · JPL
347621	2001 SB_{114}	—	September 20, 2001	Desert Eagle	W. K. Y. Yeung	·	2.6 km	MPC · JPL
347622	2001 SU_{122}	—	September 16, 2001	Socorro	LINEAR	·	1.2 km	MPC · JPL
347623	2001 SN_{124}	—	September 16, 2001	Socorro	LINEAR	·	1.1 km	MPC · JPL
347624	2001 SJ_{128}	—	September 16, 2001	Socorro	LINEAR	·	1.2 km	MPC · JPL
347625	2001 SM_{130}	—	September 16, 2001	Socorro	LINEAR	·	1.2 km	MPC · JPL
347626	2001 SM_{131}	—	September 16, 2001	Socorro	LINEAR	V	670 m	MPC · JPL
347627	2001 SG_{134}	—	September 16, 2001	Socorro	LINEAR	·	3.2 km	MPC · JPL
347628	2001 SG_{154}	—	September 17, 2001	Socorro	LINEAR	NYS	1.1 km	MPC · JPL
347629	2001 SY_{174}	—	September 16, 2001	Socorro	LINEAR	·	3.0 km	MPC · JPL
347630	2001 SZ_{191}	—	May 22, 2001	Cerro Tololo	Deep Ecliptic Survey	·	790 m	MPC · JPL
347631	2001 SO_{199}	—	September 19, 2001	Socorro	LINEAR	(2076)	830 m	MPC · JPL
347632	2001 SG_{211}	—	September 19, 2001	Socorro	LINEAR	·	860 m	MPC · JPL
347633	2001 SW_{264}	—	September 16, 2001	Socorro	LINEAR	·	1.6 km	MPC · JPL
347634	2001 SW_{269}	—	September 21, 2001	Socorro	LINEAR	APO	420 m	MPC · JPL
347635	2001 SQ_{277}	—	September 21, 2001	Anderson Mesa	LONEOS	·	1.1 km	MPC · JPL
347636	2001 SC_{303}	—	September 20, 2001	Socorro	LINEAR	·	1.3 km	MPC · JPL
347637	2001 SA_{304}	—	September 20, 2001	Socorro	LINEAR	·	1.1 km	MPC · JPL
347638	2001 SZ_{327}	—	September 18, 2001	Anderson Mesa	LONEOS	·	1.0 km	MPC · JPL
347639	2001 SU_{339}	—	September 21, 2001	Anderson Mesa	LONEOS	·	3.2 km	MPC · JPL
347640	2001 TG_{1}	—	October 10, 2001	Kitt Peak	Spacewatch	MAS	500 m	MPC · JPL
347641	2001 TJ_{4}	—	October 7, 2001	Palomar	NEAT	·	2.6 km	MPC · JPL
347642	2001 TR_{9}	—	October 13, 2001	Socorro	LINEAR	V	820 m	MPC · JPL
347643	2001 TP_{29}	—	October 14, 2001	Socorro	LINEAR	·	2.8 km	MPC · JPL
347644	2001 TO_{45}	—	October 14, 2001	Desert Eagle	W. K. Y. Yeung	ADE	2.3 km	MPC · JPL
347645	2001 TT_{52}	—	October 13, 2001	Socorro	LINEAR	·	860 m	MPC · JPL
347646	2001 TR_{54}	—	October 14, 2001	Socorro	LINEAR	·	2.4 km	MPC · JPL
347647	2001 TS_{60}	—	October 13, 2001	Socorro	LINEAR	·	1.4 km	MPC · JPL
347648	2001 TF_{75}	—	October 13, 2001	Socorro	LINEAR	·	1.1 km	MPC · JPL
347649	2001 TP_{76}	—	September 19, 2001	Socorro	LINEAR	·	1.8 km	MPC · JPL
347650	2001 TW_{89}	—	September 17, 2001	Socorro	LINEAR	·	3.6 km	MPC · JPL
347651	2001 TY_{93}	—	October 14, 2001	Socorro	LINEAR	·	1.4 km	MPC · JPL
347652	2001 TC_{100}	—	October 14, 2001	Socorro	LINEAR	·	3.4 km	MPC · JPL
347653	2001 TD_{127}	—	October 13, 2001	Kitt Peak	Spacewatch	·	2.2 km	MPC · JPL
347654	2001 TN_{130}	—	October 8, 2001	Palomar	NEAT	·	1.1 km	MPC · JPL
347655	2001 TU_{153}	—	October 13, 2001	Palomar	NEAT	·	2.7 km	MPC · JPL
347656	2001 TG_{155}	—	October 13, 2001	Kitt Peak	Spacewatch	·	2.3 km	MPC · JPL
347657	2001 TV_{177}	—	October 14, 2001	Socorro	LINEAR	NYS	1.1 km	MPC · JPL
347658	2001 TV_{182}	—	October 14, 2001	Socorro	LINEAR	·	2.6 km	MPC · JPL
347659	2001 TC_{186}	—	October 14, 2001	Socorro	LINEAR	NYS	870 m	MPC · JPL
347660	2001 TU_{186}	—	October 14, 2001	Socorro	LINEAR	·	1.1 km	MPC · JPL
347661	2001 TJ_{198}	—	September 12, 2001	Socorro	LINEAR	·	960 m	MPC · JPL
347662	2001 TJ_{201}	—	October 11, 2001	Socorro	LINEAR	·	2.6 km	MPC · JPL
347663	2001 TK_{205}	—	October 11, 2001	Socorro	LINEAR	·	2.7 km	MPC · JPL
347664	2001 TT_{214}	—	October 13, 2001	Palomar	NEAT	·	1.4 km	MPC · JPL
347665	2001 TG_{226}	—	October 14, 2001	Palomar	NEAT	·	1.2 km	MPC · JPL
347666	2001 TO_{259}	—	October 11, 2001	Palomar	NEAT	·	2.7 km	MPC · JPL
347667	2001 TN_{261}	—	April 20, 2007	Kitt Peak	Spacewatch	·	1.2 km	MPC · JPL
347668	2001 UR_{8}	—	October 14, 2001	Anderson Mesa	LONEOS	·	3.7 km	MPC · JPL
347669	2001 UF_{12}	—	October 24, 2001	Desert Eagle	W. K. Y. Yeung	·	1.2 km	MPC · JPL
347670	2001 UR_{24}	—	October 18, 2001	Socorro	LINEAR	·	1.3 km	MPC · JPL
347671	2001 UV_{44}	—	October 17, 2001	Socorro	LINEAR	·	930 m	MPC · JPL
347672	2001 UY_{54}	—	October 16, 2001	Socorro	LINEAR	·	3.2 km	MPC · JPL
347673	2001 UE_{58}	—	October 17, 2001	Socorro	LINEAR	·	1.1 km	MPC · JPL
347674	2001 UB_{70}	—	October 17, 2001	Kitt Peak	Spacewatch	·	2.3 km	MPC · JPL
347675	2001 UL_{71}	—	September 22, 2001	Kitt Peak	Spacewatch	·	2.8 km	MPC · JPL
347676	2001 UR_{94}	—	October 19, 2001	Haleakala	NEAT	·	1.5 km	MPC · JPL
347677	2001 UH_{99}	—	October 17, 2001	Socorro	LINEAR	·	970 m	MPC · JPL
347678	2001 UG_{120}	—	October 22, 2001	Socorro	LINEAR	·	2.9 km	MPC · JPL
347679	2001 UT_{132}	—	October 21, 2001	Socorro	LINEAR	·	2.3 km	MPC · JPL
347680	2001 UJ_{146}	—	October 23, 2001	Socorro	LINEAR	·	660 m	MPC · JPL
347681	2001 UJ_{164}	—	October 18, 2001	Palomar	NEAT	·	1.7 km	MPC · JPL
347682	2001 UA_{165}	—	October 23, 2001	Palomar	NEAT	·	4.4 km	MPC · JPL
347683	2001 UE_{172}	—	October 18, 2001	Palomar	NEAT	·	790 m	MPC · JPL
347684	2001 UJ_{186}	—	October 17, 2001	Socorro	LINEAR	V	990 m	MPC · JPL
347685	2001 UG_{208}	—	October 20, 2001	Kitt Peak	Spacewatch	NYS	720 m	MPC · JPL
347686	2001 VQ_{6}	—	November 9, 2001	Socorro	LINEAR	MAS	810 m	MPC · JPL
347687	2001 VZ_{6}	—	November 9, 2001	Socorro	LINEAR	NYS	1.2 km	MPC · JPL
347688	2001 VA_{11}	—	November 10, 2001	Socorro	LINEAR	·	3.9 km	MPC · JPL
347689	2001 VS_{20}	—	November 9, 2001	Socorro	LINEAR	NYS	1.3 km	MPC · JPL
347690	2001 VN_{38}	—	November 9, 2001	Socorro	LINEAR	·	650 m	MPC · JPL
347691	2001 VD_{78}	—	November 11, 2001	Kitt Peak	Spacewatch	MAS	730 m	MPC · JPL
347692	2001 VM_{78}	—	November 13, 2001	Socorro	LINEAR	H	820 m	MPC · JPL
347693	2001 VP_{79}	—	November 9, 2001	Palomar	NEAT	·	1.2 km	MPC · JPL
347694	2001 VO_{90}	—	November 15, 2001	Socorro	LINEAR	·	3.4 km	MPC · JPL
347695	2001 VO_{119}	—	November 12, 2001	Socorro	LINEAR	·	1.2 km	MPC · JPL
347696	2001 VN_{131}	—	November 11, 2001	Apache Point	SDSS	·	2.6 km	MPC · JPL
347697	2001 VD_{134}	—	November 12, 2001	Apache Point	SDSS	·	1.4 km	MPC · JPL
347698	2001 WG_{1}	—	November 17, 2001	Socorro	LINEAR	H	640 m	MPC · JPL
347699	2001 WR_{6}	—	November 17, 2001	Socorro	LINEAR	·	1.5 km	MPC · JPL
347700	2001 WD_{13}	—	November 17, 2001	Socorro	LINEAR	·	1.2 km	MPC · JPL

== 347701–347800 ==
back to top

Designation			Discovery			Properties		Ref
Permanent	Provisional	Named after	Date	Site	Discoverer(s)	Category	Diam.	Ref
347701	2001 WF_{35}	—	November 17, 2001	Socorro	LINEAR	BAP	1.2 km	MPC · JPL
347702	2001 WE_{36}	—	November 17, 2001	Socorro	LINEAR	·	3.1 km	MPC · JPL
347703	2001 WX_{43}	—	November 18, 2001	Socorro	LINEAR	·	2.5 km	MPC · JPL
347704	2001 WO_{50}	—	November 17, 2001	Socorro	LINEAR	·	1.6 km	MPC · JPL
347705	2001 WG_{67}	—	October 23, 2001	Socorro	LINEAR	·	3.2 km	MPC · JPL
347706	2001 WO_{72}	—	October 13, 2001	Kitt Peak	Spacewatch	MAS	610 m	MPC · JPL
347707	2001 XR_{3}	—	December 9, 2001	Socorro	LINEAR	H	900 m	MPC · JPL
347708	2001 XO_{15}	—	December 10, 2001	Socorro	LINEAR	·	1.2 km	MPC · JPL
347709	2001 XR_{15}	—	December 10, 2001	Socorro	LINEAR	·	3.9 km	MPC · JPL
347710	2001 XK_{46}	—	December 9, 2001	Socorro	LINEAR	·	5.7 km	MPC · JPL
347711	2001 XQ_{56}	—	December 10, 2001	Socorro	LINEAR	·	3.2 km	MPC · JPL
347712	2001 XY_{60}	—	December 10, 2001	Socorro	LINEAR	·	3.8 km	MPC · JPL
347713	2001 XU_{70}	—	December 11, 2001	Socorro	LINEAR	·	1.6 km	MPC · JPL
347714	2001 XX_{71}	—	December 11, 2001	Socorro	LINEAR	·	1.4 km	MPC · JPL
347715	2001 XD_{73}	—	December 11, 2001	Socorro	LINEAR	·	3.0 km	MPC · JPL
347716	2001 XQ_{84}	—	December 11, 2001	Socorro	LINEAR	·	2.9 km	MPC · JPL
347717	2001 XB_{94}	—	December 10, 2001	Socorro	LINEAR	·	1.2 km	MPC · JPL
347718	2001 XO_{102}	—	December 11, 2001	Socorro	LINEAR	H	720 m	MPC · JPL
347719	2001 XO_{114}	—	December 13, 2001	Socorro	LINEAR	·	3.0 km	MPC · JPL
347720	2001 XM_{130}	—	December 14, 2001	Socorro	LINEAR	·	1.3 km	MPC · JPL
347721	2001 XX_{131}	—	December 14, 2001	Socorro	LINEAR	·	3.4 km	MPC · JPL
347722	2001 XB_{169}	—	December 14, 2001	Socorro	LINEAR	·	4.6 km	MPC · JPL
347723	2001 XC_{200}	—	December 14, 2001	Socorro	LINEAR	·	4.6 km	MPC · JPL
347724	2001 XQ_{211}	—	December 11, 2001	Socorro	LINEAR	·	1.5 km	MPC · JPL
347725	2001 XY_{211}	—	December 11, 2001	Socorro	LINEAR	·	3.4 km	MPC · JPL
347726	2001 XG_{226}	—	December 15, 2001	Socorro	LINEAR	·	3.7 km	MPC · JPL
347727	2001 XG_{249}	—	December 14, 2001	Kitt Peak	Spacewatch	·	1.6 km	MPC · JPL
347728	2001 XN_{260}	—	December 10, 2001	Kitt Peak	Spacewatch	·	1.1 km	MPC · JPL
347729	2001 XH_{267}	—	December 9, 2001	Socorro	LINEAR	·	3.6 km	MPC · JPL
347730	2001 YX_{2}	—	December 17, 2001	Socorro	LINEAR	H	740 m	MPC · JPL
347731	2001 YG_{6}	—	December 23, 2001	Kingsnake	J. V. McClusky	·	3.2 km	MPC · JPL
347732	2001 YA_{28}	—	December 18, 2001	Socorro	LINEAR	TIR	3.2 km	MPC · JPL
347733	2001 YU_{90}	—	December 17, 2001	Palomar	NEAT	TIR	3.6 km	MPC · JPL
347734	2001 YC_{139}	—	December 19, 2001	Kitt Peak	Spacewatch	·	3.4 km	MPC · JPL
347735	2001 YF_{143}	—	December 17, 2001	Socorro	LINEAR	TIR	3.5 km	MPC · JPL
347736	2001 YS_{150}	—	December 19, 2001	Socorro	LINEAR	·	1.4 km	MPC · JPL
347737	2002 AM_{12}	—	January 10, 2002	Campo Imperatore	CINEOS	·	1.3 km	MPC · JPL
347738	2002 AT_{44}	—	January 9, 2002	Socorro	LINEAR	ELF	5.0 km	MPC · JPL
347739	2002 AL_{51}	—	January 9, 2002	Socorro	LINEAR	·	3.8 km	MPC · JPL
347740	2002 AO_{52}	—	January 9, 2002	Socorro	LINEAR	V	960 m	MPC · JPL
347741	2002 AP_{53}	—	January 9, 2002	Socorro	LINEAR	·	4.3 km	MPC · JPL
347742	2002 AO_{56}	—	January 9, 2002	Socorro	LINEAR	·	4.6 km	MPC · JPL
347743	2002 AN_{59}	—	January 9, 2002	Socorro	LINEAR	EUP	6.7 km	MPC · JPL
347744	2002 AU_{78}	—	January 8, 2002	Socorro	LINEAR	·	4.0 km	MPC · JPL
347745	2002 AA_{80}	—	January 8, 2002	Socorro	LINEAR	·	3.5 km	MPC · JPL
347746	2002 AB_{103}	—	January 6, 2002	Kitt Peak	Spacewatch	(5)	1.6 km	MPC · JPL
347747	2002 AB_{115}	—	January 9, 2002	Socorro	LINEAR	LIX	4.0 km	MPC · JPL
347748	2002 AR_{122}	—	January 9, 2002	Socorro	LINEAR	·	3.4 km	MPC · JPL
347749	2002 AT_{129}	—	January 15, 2002	Kingsnake	J. V. McClusky	T_{j} (2.97)	3.3 km	MPC · JPL
347750	2002 AF_{142}	—	January 13, 2002	Socorro	LINEAR	·	1.5 km	MPC · JPL
347751	2002 AN_{142}	—	January 13, 2002	Socorro	LINEAR	·	2.8 km	MPC · JPL
347752	2002 AM_{150}	—	January 14, 2002	Socorro	LINEAR	·	1.3 km	MPC · JPL
347753	2002 AS_{164}	—	January 13, 2002	Socorro	LINEAR	LUT	6.0 km	MPC · JPL
347754	2002 AG_{182}	—	January 5, 2002	Palomar	NEAT	LIX	4.8 km	MPC · JPL
347755	2002 AX_{183}	—	January 6, 2002	Palomar	NEAT	·	2.8 km	MPC · JPL
347756	2002 AK_{198}	—	January 8, 2002	Socorro	LINEAR	H	740 m	MPC · JPL
347757	2002 AO_{198}	—	January 9, 2002	Socorro	LINEAR	ERI	1.9 km	MPC · JPL
347758	2002 BF_{13}	—	January 18, 2002	Socorro	LINEAR	PHO	2.0 km	MPC · JPL
347759	2002 BT_{22}	—	January 23, 2002	Socorro	LINEAR	·	3.8 km	MPC · JPL
347760	2002 BW_{27}	—	January 20, 2002	Anderson Mesa	LONEOS	TIR	3.5 km	MPC · JPL
347761	2002 CL_{8}	—	February 5, 2002	Palomar	NEAT	·	3.7 km	MPC · JPL
347762	2002 CF_{12}	—	February 7, 2002	Socorro	LINEAR	PHO	1.3 km	MPC · JPL
347763	2002 CH_{28}	—	February 6, 2002	Socorro	LINEAR	·	1.7 km	MPC · JPL
347764	2002 CJ_{53}	—	February 7, 2002	Socorro	LINEAR	·	2.6 km	MPC · JPL
347765	2002 CF_{66}	—	February 7, 2002	Socorro	LINEAR	·	1.3 km	MPC · JPL
347766	2002 CH_{70}	—	February 7, 2002	Socorro	LINEAR	·	5.3 km	MPC · JPL
347767	2002 CN_{88}	—	February 7, 2002	Socorro	LINEAR	·	1.3 km	MPC · JPL
347768	2002 CS_{116}	—	February 15, 2002	Ondřejov	P. Pravec	·	1.1 km	MPC · JPL
347769	2002 CC_{150}	—	February 10, 2002	Socorro	LINEAR	·	1.4 km	MPC · JPL
347770	2002 CP_{157}	—	February 7, 2002	Socorro	LINEAR	·	3.6 km	MPC · JPL
347771	2002 CM_{172}	—	February 8, 2002	Socorro	LINEAR	·	800 m	MPC · JPL
347772	2002 CS_{179}	—	February 10, 2002	Socorro	LINEAR	·	3.5 km	MPC · JPL
347773	2002 CK_{181}	—	February 10, 2002	Socorro	LINEAR	VER	3.2 km	MPC · JPL
347774	2002 CC_{185}	—	February 10, 2002	Socorro	LINEAR	·	3.9 km	MPC · JPL
347775	2002 CL_{192}	—	February 10, 2002	Socorro	LINEAR	·	1.4 km	MPC · JPL
347776	2002 CC_{205}	—	February 10, 2002	Socorro	LINEAR	·	1.4 km	MPC · JPL
347777	2002 CG_{230}	—	January 13, 2002	Desert Eagle	W. K. Y. Yeung	·	890 m	MPC · JPL
347778	2002 CC_{232}	—	February 8, 2002	Socorro	LINEAR	H	790 m	MPC · JPL
347779	2002 CK_{241}	—	February 11, 2002	Socorro	LINEAR	·	1.2 km	MPC · JPL
347780	2002 CJ_{276}	—	February 9, 2002	Kitt Peak	Spacewatch	·	1.8 km	MPC · JPL
347781	2002 CO_{283}	—	February 9, 2002	Kitt Peak	Spacewatch	·	1.5 km	MPC · JPL
347782	2002 CS_{283}	—	February 9, 2002	Desert Eagle	W. K. Y. Yeung	·	2.4 km	MPC · JPL
347783	2002 CV_{293}	—	February 9, 2002	Palomar	NEAT	EUP	6.6 km	MPC · JPL
347784	2002 DF_{3}	—	February 21, 2002	Socorro	LINEAR	·	4.5 km	MPC · JPL
347785	2002 DG_{7}	—	February 19, 2002	Socorro	LINEAR	·	4.0 km	MPC · JPL
347786	2002 EY_{6}	—	March 6, 2002	Siding Spring	R. H. McNaught	·	1.4 km	MPC · JPL
347787	2002 EB_{102}	—	March 6, 2002	Socorro	LINEAR	·	1.9 km	MPC · JPL
347788	2002 EU_{147}	—	March 15, 2002	Palomar	NEAT	·	1.4 km	MPC · JPL
347789	2002 EW_{149}	—	March 15, 2002	Palomar	NEAT	·	1.4 km	MPC · JPL
347790	2002 FO_{24}	—	March 19, 2002	Palomar	NEAT	TIR	4.2 km	MPC · JPL
347791	2002 GV_{2}	—	April 4, 2002	Haleakala	NEAT	·	1.6 km	MPC · JPL
347792	2002 GG_{119}	—	April 12, 2002	Palomar	NEAT	T_{j} (2.98)	3.4 km	MPC · JPL
347793	2002 GB_{181}	—	April 10, 2002	Palomar	NEAT	TIR	2.9 km	MPC · JPL
347794	2002 GQ_{183}	—	April 9, 2002	Palomar	NEAT	·	1.4 km	MPC · JPL
347795	2002 GV_{183}	—	April 9, 2002	Palomar	NEAT	·	1.6 km	MPC · JPL
347796	2002 GA_{185}	—	April 9, 2002	Palomar	NEAT	·	1.3 km	MPC · JPL
347797	2002 GU_{188}	—	April 9, 2002	Palomar	NEAT	·	1.4 km	MPC · JPL
347798	2002 GL_{190}	—	September 20, 2003	Kitt Peak	Spacewatch	·	3.1 km	MPC · JPL
347799	2002 GO_{190}	—	April 19, 2006	Kitt Peak	Spacewatch	·	1.6 km	MPC · JPL
347800	2002 JS_{17}	—	May 7, 2002	Palomar	NEAT	NYS	1.5 km	MPC · JPL

== 347801–347900 ==
back to top

Designation			Discovery			Properties		Ref
Permanent	Provisional	Named after	Date	Site	Discoverer(s)	Category	Diam.	Ref
347801	2002 JE_{20}	—	April 16, 2002	Socorro	LINEAR	H	670 m	MPC · JPL
347802	2002 JN_{31}	—	May 9, 2002	Socorro	LINEAR	·	2.0 km	MPC · JPL
347803	2002 JY_{55}	—	May 9, 2002	Socorro	LINEAR	·	2.2 km	MPC · JPL
347804	2002 JS_{104}	—	May 11, 2002	Socorro	LINEAR	·	2.3 km	MPC · JPL
347805	2002 JP_{110}	—	May 11, 2002	Socorro	LINEAR	·	1.8 km	MPC · JPL
347806	2002 JL_{132}	—	May 9, 2002	Palomar	NEAT	·	2.4 km	MPC · JPL
347807	2002 JX_{146}	—	May 7, 2002	Palomar	NEAT	MAR	1.4 km	MPC · JPL
347808	2002 LJ_{2}	—	May 15, 2002	Socorro	LINEAR	H	730 m	MPC · JPL
347809	2002 LJ_{39}	—	June 10, 2002	Socorro	LINEAR	(194)	2.4 km	MPC · JPL
347810	2002 LM_{42}	—	June 10, 2002	Socorro	LINEAR	·	2.3 km	MPC · JPL
347811	2002 LX_{62}	—	June 13, 2002	Palomar	NEAT	EUN	1.6 km	MPC · JPL
347812	2002 MW_{3}	—	June 25, 2002	Haleakala	NEAT	·	2.6 km	MPC · JPL
347813	2002 NP_{1}	—	July 5, 2002	Socorro	LINEAR	AMO +1km	1.1 km	MPC · JPL
347814	2002 NQ_{24}	—	July 9, 2002	Socorro	LINEAR	·	3.5 km	MPC · JPL
347815	2002 NG_{60}	—	July 14, 2002	Palomar	NEAT	·	1.9 km	MPC · JPL
347816	2002 NN_{66}	—	July 9, 2002	Palomar	NEAT	·	660 m	MPC · JPL
347817	2002 NQ_{80}	—	May 24, 2006	Mount Lemmon	Mount Lemmon Survey	·	2.3 km	MPC · JPL
347818	2002 OZ_{5}	—	July 20, 2002	Palomar	NEAT	·	680 m	MPC · JPL
347819	2002 OX_{6}	—	July 20, 2002	Palomar	NEAT	·	1.9 km	MPC · JPL
347820	2002 OQ_{11}	—	July 18, 2002	Socorro	LINEAR	·	2.1 km	MPC · JPL
347821	2002 OM_{25}	—	July 30, 2002	Haleakala	S. F. Hönig	·	3.8 km	MPC · JPL
347822	2002 OZ_{31}	—	July 17, 2002	Palomar	NEAT	AEO	1.1 km	MPC · JPL
347823	2002 OE_{34}	—	January 29, 2009	Mount Lemmon	Mount Lemmon Survey	·	2.2 km	MPC · JPL
347824	2002 OM_{36}	—	October 31, 2007	Catalina	CSS	·	4.1 km	MPC · JPL
347825	2002 PD_{3}	—	August 3, 2002	Palomar	NEAT	ADE	3.6 km	MPC · JPL
347826	2002 PZ_{3}	—	June 23, 2002	La Palma	S. Collander-Brown, A. Fitzsimmons	·	2.3 km	MPC · JPL
347827	2002 PM_{24}	—	August 6, 2002	Palomar	NEAT	·	2.2 km	MPC · JPL
347828	2002 PL_{25}	—	August 6, 2002	Palomar	NEAT	·	3.5 km	MPC · JPL
347829	2002 PP_{33}	—	August 6, 2002	Campo Imperatore	CINEOS	URS	4.6 km	MPC · JPL
347830	2002 PU_{38}	—	August 6, 2002	Palomar	NEAT	·	1.1 km	MPC · JPL
347831	2002 PH_{65}	—	August 11, 2002	Palomar	NEAT	ADE	2.8 km	MPC · JPL
347832	2002 PH_{68}	—	August 6, 2002	Palomar	NEAT	·	1.9 km	MPC · JPL
347833	2002 PY_{71}	—	July 9, 2002	Socorro	LINEAR	EUN	1.5 km	MPC · JPL
347834	2002 PL_{72}	—	August 12, 2002	Socorro	LINEAR	·	2.6 km	MPC · JPL
347835	2002 PV_{99}	—	August 14, 2002	Socorro	LINEAR	·	660 m	MPC · JPL
347836	2002 PA_{101}	—	August 11, 2002	Palomar	NEAT	EOS	2.3 km	MPC · JPL
347837	2002 PO_{107}	—	August 13, 2002	Palomar	NEAT	·	2.3 km	MPC · JPL
347838	2002 PY_{138}	—	August 12, 2002	Socorro	LINEAR	·	2.0 km	MPC · JPL
347839	2002 PK_{140}	—	August 14, 2002	Socorro	LINEAR	PHO	1.2 km	MPC · JPL
347840	2002 PM_{176}	—	August 7, 2002	Palomar	NEAT	·	2.3 km	MPC · JPL
347841	2002 PR_{190}	—	August 15, 2002	Palomar	NEAT	·	1.9 km	MPC · JPL
347842	2002 QL_{15}	—	August 17, 2002	Palomar	NEAT	·	2.4 km	MPC · JPL
347843	2002 QB_{19}	—	August 26, 2002	Palomar	NEAT	·	1.5 km	MPC · JPL
347844	2002 QX_{24}	—	August 28, 2002	Socorro	LINEAR	·	3.1 km	MPC · JPL
347845	2002 QA_{68}	—	August 28, 2002	Palomar	NEAT	·	1.6 km	MPC · JPL
347846	2002 QX_{70}	—	August 18, 2002	Palomar	NEAT	·	1.9 km	MPC · JPL
347847	2002 QH_{83}	—	August 16, 2002	Palomar	NEAT	·	1.5 km	MPC · JPL
347848	2002 QO_{84}	—	August 16, 2002	Palomar	NEAT	·	2.2 km	MPC · JPL
347849	2002 QS_{88}	—	August 30, 2002	Palomar	NEAT	·	2.4 km	MPC · JPL
347850	2002 QO_{93}	—	August 18, 2002	Palomar	NEAT	AGN	1.3 km	MPC · JPL
347851	2002 QK_{118}	—	August 30, 2002	Palomar	NEAT	·	1.8 km	MPC · JPL
347852	2002 QQ_{134}	—	August 30, 2002	Palomar	NEAT	MRX	1.2 km	MPC · JPL
347853	2002 QK_{144}	—	October 15, 2007	Mount Lemmon	Mount Lemmon Survey	PAD	1.5 km	MPC · JPL
347854	2002 QQ_{149}	—	October 8, 2007	Calvin-Rehoboth	L. A. Molnar	·	1.6 km	MPC · JPL
347855	2002 RW_{30}	—	September 4, 2002	Anderson Mesa	LONEOS	·	2.7 km	MPC · JPL
347856	2002 RW_{43}	—	September 5, 2002	Socorro	LINEAR	DOR	3.0 km	MPC · JPL
347857	2002 RW_{74}	—	September 5, 2002	Socorro	LINEAR	·	2.8 km	MPC · JPL
347858	2002 RW_{122}	—	September 8, 2002	Haleakala	NEAT	·	2.9 km	MPC · JPL
347859	2002 RT_{132}	—	September 12, 2002	Essen	M. Fröhlich, A. Knöfel	H	570 m	MPC · JPL
347860	2002 RG_{175}	—	September 13, 2002	Palomar	NEAT	·	600 m	MPC · JPL
347861	2002 RT_{190}	—	September 12, 2002	Haleakala	NEAT	·	850 m	MPC · JPL
347862	2002 RB_{201}	—	September 13, 2002	Socorro	LINEAR	·	2.7 km	MPC · JPL
347863	2002 RE_{201}	—	September 13, 2002	Socorro	LINEAR	·	640 m	MPC · JPL
347864	2002 RW_{213}	—	September 5, 2002	Anderson Mesa	LONEOS	·	830 m	MPC · JPL
347865	2002 RE_{235}	—	September 11, 2002	Palomar	White, M., M. Collins	HOF	2.4 km	MPC · JPL
347866	2002 RN_{237}	—	September 15, 2002	Palomar	R. Matson	HOF	2.9 km	MPC · JPL
347867	2002 RB_{241}	—	September 14, 2002	Palomar	R. Matson	·	2.2 km	MPC · JPL
347868	2002 RD_{243}	—	September 14, 2002	Palomar	NEAT	·	1.1 km	MPC · JPL
347869	2002 RB_{246}	—	September 1, 2002	Palomar	NEAT	AGN	1.2 km	MPC · JPL
347870	2002 RE_{246}	—	September 1, 2002	Palomar	NEAT	·	1.7 km	MPC · JPL
347871	2002 RL_{269}	—	September 10, 2002	Palomar	NEAT	GEF	1.4 km	MPC · JPL
347872	2002 RZ_{270}	—	September 4, 2002	Palomar	NEAT	PAD	1.7 km	MPC · JPL
347873	2002 SN_{52}	—	September 17, 2002	Palomar	NEAT	GEF	1.7 km	MPC · JPL
347874	2002 TU_{3}	—	September 17, 2002	Haleakala	NEAT	·	1.7 km	MPC · JPL
347875	2002 TA_{24}	—	October 2, 2002	Socorro	LINEAR	·	2.2 km	MPC · JPL
347876	2002 TF_{26}	—	October 2, 2002	Socorro	LINEAR	·	4.1 km	MPC · JPL
347877	2002 TW_{52}	—	October 2, 2002	Socorro	LINEAR	·	2.5 km	MPC · JPL
347878	2002 TH_{56}	—	October 2, 2002	Socorro	LINEAR	EOS	2.4 km	MPC · JPL
347879	2002 TM_{59}	—	October 3, 2002	Palomar	NEAT	H	610 m	MPC · JPL
347880	2002 TP_{84}	—	October 2, 2002	Haleakala	NEAT	·	2.7 km	MPC · JPL
347881	2002 TG_{85}	—	October 2, 2002	Haleakala	NEAT	H	650 m	MPC · JPL
347882	2002 TJ_{109}	—	October 2, 2002	Haleakala	NEAT	·	2.6 km	MPC · JPL
347883	2002 TU_{129}	—	October 4, 2002	Palomar	NEAT	·	1.9 km	MPC · JPL
347884	2002 TE_{156}	—	October 5, 2002	Palomar	NEAT	VER	3.7 km	MPC · JPL
347885	2002 TB_{169}	—	October 3, 2002	Palomar	NEAT	·	4.1 km	MPC · JPL
347886	2002 TG_{170}	—	October 3, 2002	Palomar	NEAT	·	2.9 km	MPC · JPL
347887	2002 TG_{186}	—	October 4, 2002	Socorro	LINEAR	·	690 m	MPC · JPL
347888	2002 TE_{190}	—	October 6, 2002	Socorro	LINEAR	BRA	1.7 km	MPC · JPL
347889	2002 TX_{202}	—	October 4, 2002	Socorro	LINEAR	·	2.2 km	MPC · JPL
347890	2002 TQ_{207}	—	October 4, 2002	Socorro	LINEAR	·	760 m	MPC · JPL
347891	2002 TS_{218}	—	October 5, 2002	Socorro	LINEAR	·	3.3 km	MPC · JPL
347892	2002 TR_{219}	—	October 5, 2002	Socorro	LINEAR	·	900 m	MPC · JPL
347893	2002 TO_{287}	—	October 10, 2002	Socorro	LINEAR	·	2.8 km	MPC · JPL
347894	2002 TO_{364}	—	October 10, 2002	Apache Point	SDSS	615	1.4 km	MPC · JPL
347895	2002 TP_{368}	—	October 10, 2002	Apache Point	SDSS	EOS	2.2 km	MPC · JPL
347896	2002 TQ_{369}	—	October 10, 2002	Apache Point	SDSS	·	2.8 km	MPC · JPL
347897	2002 TY_{379}	—	October 6, 2002	Palomar	NEAT	·	1.9 km	MPC · JPL
347898	2002 UH_{74}	—	October 30, 2002	Palomar	NEAT	·	800 m	MPC · JPL
347899	2002 UR_{74}	—	October 30, 2002	Palomar	NEAT	·	660 m	MPC · JPL
347900	2002 VR_{3}	—	November 1, 2002	Palomar	NEAT	·	670 m	MPC · JPL

== 347901–348000 ==
back to top

Designation			Discovery			Properties		Ref
Permanent	Provisional	Named after	Date	Site	Discoverer(s)	Category	Diam.	Ref
347901	2002 VD_{5}	—	November 5, 2002	Wrightwood	J. W. Young	HOF	3.6 km	MPC · JPL
347902	2002 VO_{71}	—	November 7, 2002	Socorro	LINEAR	·	2.6 km	MPC · JPL
347903	2002 VC_{76}	—	November 7, 2002	Socorro	LINEAR	·	800 m	MPC · JPL
347904	2002 VO_{138}	—	November 15, 2002	Palomar	NEAT	·	710 m	MPC · JPL
347905	2002 WV_{12}	—	November 6, 2002	Socorro	LINEAR	H	850 m	MPC · JPL
347906	2002 WT_{24}	—	November 7, 2002	Kitt Peak	Spacewatch	·	630 m	MPC · JPL
347907	2002 WQ_{30}	—	November 24, 2002	Palomar	NEAT	KOR	1.9 km	MPC · JPL
347908	2002 XW_{1}	—	December 1, 2002	Socorro	LINEAR	·	990 m	MPC · JPL
347909	2002 XL_{18}	—	December 5, 2002	Socorro	LINEAR	·	800 m	MPC · JPL
347910	2002 XP_{52}	—	December 10, 2002	Socorro	LINEAR	·	1.1 km	MPC · JPL
347911	2002 XA_{121}	—	December 3, 2002	Palomar	NEAT	·	1.9 km	MPC · JPL
347912	2002 YK_{15}	—	December 31, 2002	Socorro	LINEAR	·	2.4 km	MPC · JPL
347913	2002 YL_{26}	—	December 31, 2002	Socorro	LINEAR	·	820 m	MPC · JPL
347914	2003 AN_{3}	—	January 1, 2003	Socorro	LINEAR	H	840 m	MPC · JPL
347915	2003 AQ_{51}	—	January 5, 2003	Socorro	LINEAR	·	2.7 km	MPC · JPL
347916	2003 BO_{37}	—	January 28, 2003	Kitt Peak	Spacewatch	·	740 m	MPC · JPL
347917	2003 BS_{39}	—	December 28, 2002	Kitt Peak	Spacewatch	EOS	2.1 km	MPC · JPL
347918	2003 BD_{42}	—	January 27, 2003	Palomar	NEAT	·	1.2 km	MPC · JPL
347919	2003 BS_{42}	—	January 29, 2003	Palomar	NEAT	·	1.5 km	MPC · JPL
347920	2003 BX_{46}	—	January 24, 2003	Pla D'Arguines	R. Ferrando	·	1.1 km	MPC · JPL
347921	2003 BU_{70}	—	January 31, 2003	Kitt Peak	Spacewatch	·	1.6 km	MPC · JPL
347922	2003 BA_{77}	—	January 29, 2003	Palomar	NEAT	·	3.7 km	MPC · JPL
347923	2003 BA_{91}	—	January 31, 2003	Socorro	LINEAR	·	4.2 km	MPC · JPL
347924	2003 BP_{93}	—	February 9, 2003	Palomar	NEAT	·	4.1 km	MPC · JPL
347925	2003 CF_{12}	—	January 28, 2003	Palomar	NEAT	ADE	2.5 km	MPC · JPL
347926	2003 CH_{17}	—	February 7, 2003	Desert Eagle	W. K. Y. Yeung	·	2.1 km	MPC · JPL
347927	2003 DZ_{12}	—	February 26, 2003	Campo Imperatore	CINEOS	·	1.6 km	MPC · JPL
347928	2003 EM	—	March 3, 2003	Socorro	LINEAR	PHO	1.2 km	MPC · JPL
347929	2003 EG_{24}	—	March 6, 2003	Socorro	LINEAR	·	820 m	MPC · JPL
347930	2003 EN_{27}	—	March 6, 2003	Anderson Mesa	LONEOS	·	930 m	MPC · JPL
347931	2003 EE_{41}	—	March 8, 2003	Palomar	NEAT	·	3.3 km	MPC · JPL
347932	2003 FW_{4}	—	March 25, 2003	Wrightwood	J. W. Young	·	3.6 km	MPC · JPL
347933	2003 FF_{58}	—	March 26, 2003	Palomar	NEAT	·	3.1 km	MPC · JPL
347934	2003 FS_{59}	—	March 26, 2003	Palomar	NEAT	·	3.2 km	MPC · JPL
347935	2003 FV_{61}	—	March 26, 2003	Palomar	NEAT	·	2.6 km	MPC · JPL
347936	2003 FK_{66}	—	March 26, 2003	Palomar	NEAT	·	3.5 km	MPC · JPL
347937	2003 FR_{86}	—	March 28, 2003	Anderson Mesa	LONEOS	·	1.5 km	MPC · JPL
347938	2003 FF_{94}	—	March 29, 2003	Anderson Mesa	LONEOS	ERI	2.2 km	MPC · JPL
347939	2003 FA_{99}	—	March 30, 2003	Socorro	LINEAR	·	1.1 km	MPC · JPL
347940 Jorgezuluaga	2003 FZ_{128}	Jorgezuluaga	March 30, 2003	Mérida	Ferrin, I., Leal, C.	·	3.1 km	MPC · JPL
347941	2003 FQ_{130}	—	March 26, 2003	Kitt Peak	Spacewatch	·	940 m	MPC · JPL
347942	2003 GV_{14}	—	April 3, 2003	Socorro	LINEAR	·	2.1 km	MPC · JPL
347943	2003 GF_{57}	—	April 9, 2003	Kitt Peak	Spacewatch	L4	10 km	MPC · JPL
347944	2003 HO_{17}	—	April 25, 2003	Anderson Mesa	LONEOS	V	790 m	MPC · JPL
347945	2003 HM_{23}	—	April 25, 2003	Kitt Peak	Spacewatch	·	1.1 km	MPC · JPL
347946	2003 HE_{26}	—	April 25, 2003	Kitt Peak	Spacewatch	·	2.9 km	MPC · JPL
347947	2003 LA	—	June 1, 2003	Kitt Peak	Spacewatch	H	840 m	MPC · JPL
347948	2003 MW_{5}	—	June 26, 2003	Socorro	LINEAR	fast	3.9 km	MPC · JPL
347949	2003 OO_{15}	—	July 23, 2003	Palomar	NEAT	·	1.9 km	MPC · JPL
347950	2003 OM_{26}	—	July 24, 2003	Palomar	NEAT	·	1.7 km	MPC · JPL
347951	2003 OM_{29}	—	July 25, 2003	Palomar	NEAT	ADE	2.7 km	MPC · JPL
347952	2003 PK_{4}	—	August 2, 2003	Reedy Creek	J. Broughton	·	1.9 km	MPC · JPL
347953	2003 QG	—	August 18, 2003	Campo Imperatore	CINEOS	(5)	1.5 km	MPC · JPL
347954	2003 QV_{23}	—	August 21, 2003	Palomar	NEAT	EUN	1.4 km	MPC · JPL
347955	2003 QV_{27}	—	July 25, 2003	Palomar	NEAT	·	1.0 km	MPC · JPL
347956	2003 QP_{61}	—	August 23, 2003	Socorro	LINEAR	·	760 m	MPC · JPL
347957	2003 QD_{77}	—	August 24, 2003	Socorro	LINEAR	(69559)	5.5 km	MPC · JPL
347958	2003 QL_{89}	—	August 26, 2003	Črni Vrh	Mikuž, H.	·	1.7 km	MPC · JPL
347959	2003 QE_{100}	—	August 28, 2003	Palomar	NEAT	·	1.0 km	MPC · JPL
347960	2003 QX_{105}	—	August 25, 2003	Socorro	LINEAR	·	1.5 km	MPC · JPL
347961	2003 RK_{1}	—	August 29, 2003	Haleakala	NEAT	·	2.0 km	MPC · JPL
347962	2003 RC_{5}	—	September 3, 2003	Essen	Essen	·	1.4 km	MPC · JPL
347963	2003 RB_{8}	—	September 4, 2003	Socorro	LINEAR	·	2.4 km	MPC · JPL
347964	2003 RE_{8}	—	September 5, 2003	Socorro	LINEAR	JUN	1.5 km	MPC · JPL
347965	2003 RZ_{9}	—	September 1, 2003	Socorro	LINEAR	·	2.0 km	MPC · JPL
347966	2003 RG_{24}	—	September 15, 2003	Anderson Mesa	LONEOS	·	1.5 km	MPC · JPL
347967	2003 SU_{25}	—	September 17, 2003	Kitt Peak	Spacewatch	·	1.2 km	MPC · JPL
347968	2003 SD_{31}	—	September 18, 2003	Kitt Peak	Spacewatch	·	810 m	MPC · JPL
347969	2003 SK_{33}	—	September 16, 2003	Anderson Mesa	LONEOS	T_{j} (2.95)	4.2 km	MPC · JPL
347970	2003 SL_{42}	—	September 16, 2003	Anderson Mesa	LONEOS	·	4.1 km	MPC · JPL
347971	2003 SN_{44}	—	September 16, 2003	Anderson Mesa	LONEOS	·	2.0 km	MPC · JPL
347972	2003 SW_{44}	—	September 16, 2003	Anderson Mesa	LONEOS	ADE	3.5 km	MPC · JPL
347973	2003 SM_{60}	—	September 17, 2003	Kitt Peak	Spacewatch	·	3.6 km	MPC · JPL
347974	2003 SR_{61}	—	September 17, 2003	Socorro	LINEAR	·	1.7 km	MPC · JPL
347975	2003 SU_{63}	—	September 17, 2003	Socorro	LINEAR	JUN	1.3 km	MPC · JPL
347976	2003 SM_{70}	—	September 17, 2003	Kitt Peak	Spacewatch	fast	1.8 km	MPC · JPL
347977	2003 SE_{80}	—	September 19, 2003	Haleakala	NEAT	·	2.0 km	MPC · JPL
347978	2003 SY_{86}	—	September 17, 2003	Socorro	LINEAR	·	1.4 km	MPC · JPL
347979	2003 SZ_{90}	—	September 18, 2003	Socorro	LINEAR	·	2.3 km	MPC · JPL
347980	2003 SQ_{91}	—	September 18, 2003	Palomar	NEAT	(1547) · fast	1.5 km	MPC · JPL
347981	2003 SM_{95}	—	September 19, 2003	Palomar	NEAT	·	1.1 km	MPC · JPL
347982	2003 SG_{98}	—	September 19, 2003	Kitt Peak	Spacewatch	·	1.5 km	MPC · JPL
347983	2003 SB_{99}	—	September 19, 2003	Haleakala	NEAT	·	3.1 km	MPC · JPL
347984	2003 SZ_{106}	—	September 20, 2003	Palomar	NEAT	·	1.4 km	MPC · JPL
347985	2003 SQ_{108}	—	September 21, 2003	Socorro	LINEAR	·	2.4 km	MPC · JPL
347986	2003 SP_{115}	—	September 16, 2003	Socorro	LINEAR	·	2.0 km	MPC · JPL
347987	2003 SY_{116}	—	September 16, 2003	Palomar	NEAT	·	1.7 km	MPC · JPL
347988	2003 SJ_{123}	—	September 18, 2003	Palomar	NEAT	·	1.7 km	MPC · JPL
347989	2003 SH_{134}	—	September 18, 2003	Palomar	NEAT	·	1.2 km	MPC · JPL
347990	2003 SO_{136}	—	September 19, 2003	Campo Imperatore	CINEOS	NYS	1.3 km	MPC · JPL
347991	2003 SR_{144}	—	September 19, 2003	Palomar	NEAT	·	1.8 km	MPC · JPL
347992	2003 SB_{148}	—	September 16, 2003	Socorro	LINEAR	·	1.1 km	MPC · JPL
347993	2003 SD_{165}	—	September 20, 2003	Anderson Mesa	LONEOS	·	2.1 km	MPC · JPL
347994	2003 SL_{165}	—	September 21, 2003	Socorro	LINEAR	·	3.1 km	MPC · JPL
347995	2003 SZ_{177}	—	September 19, 2003	Palomar	NEAT	·	1.4 km	MPC · JPL
347996	2003 SS_{194}	—	September 20, 2003	Palomar	NEAT	·	1.4 km	MPC · JPL
347997	2003 SH_{207}	—	September 26, 2003	Socorro	LINEAR	·	1.7 km	MPC · JPL
347998	2003 SA_{209}	—	September 24, 2003	Palomar	NEAT	·	1.8 km	MPC · JPL
347999	2003 SP_{209}	—	September 20, 2003	Kitt Peak	Spacewatch	·	1.6 km	MPC · JPL
348000	2003 SK_{210}	—	September 26, 2003	Socorro	LINEAR	·	770 m	MPC · JPL

back to top

== See also ==
- Meanings of minor-planet names: 347001–348000
