= List of minor planets: 344001–345000 =

The following is a partial list of minor planets, running from minor-planet number 344001 through 345000, inclusive. The primary data for this and other partial lists is based on JPL's "Small-Body Orbital Elements" and data available from the Minor Planet Center. Critical list information is also provided by the MPC, unless otherwise specified from Lowell Observatory. A detailed description of the table's columns and additional sources are given on the main page including a complete list of every page in this series, and a statistical break-up on the dynamical classification of minor planets.

Also see the summary list of all named bodies in numerical and alphabetical order, and the corresponding naming citations for the number range of this particular list. New namings may only be added to this list after official publication, as the preannouncement of names is condemned by the Working Group for Small Bodies Nomenclature of the International Astronomical Union.

Near-Earth obj.	MBA (inner)	MBA (outer)	Centaur
Mars-crosser	MBA (middle)	Jupiter trojan	Trans-Neptunian obj.
Unclassified

== 344001–344100 ==
Designation			Discovery			Properties		Ref
Permanent	Provisional	Named after	Date	Site	Discoverer(s)	Category	Diam.	Ref
344001	2011 QD_{46}	—	November 11, 2001	Kitt Peak	Spacewatch	L5	10 km	MPC · JPL
344002	2011 QN_{47}	—	September 23, 2000	Socorro	LINEAR	L5	10 km	MPC · JPL
344003	2011 QW_{53}	—	June 9, 2011	Haleakala	Pan-STARRS 1	L5	10 km	MPC · JPL
344004	2011 QV_{73}	—	December 21, 2003	Kitt Peak	Spacewatch	L5	11 km	MPC · JPL
344005	2011 QZ_{75}	—	January 26, 2006	Kitt Peak	Spacewatch	L5	8.2 km	MPC · JPL
344006	2011 QD_{77}	—	April 23, 2010	WISE	WISE	L5	6.0 km	MPC · JPL
344007	2011 RF_{2}	—	October 4, 2006	Mount Lemmon	Mount Lemmon Survey	·	4.5 km	MPC · JPL
344008	2011 SL_{6}	—	September 20, 2001	Socorro	LINEAR	·	4.5 km	MPC · JPL
344009	2011 SH_{99}	—	November 13, 2007	Mount Lemmon	Mount Lemmon Survey	·	2.2 km	MPC · JPL
344010	2011 SN_{121}	—	April 20, 2009	Kitt Peak	Spacewatch	URS	3.4 km	MPC · JPL
344011	2011 UH_{57}	—	February 8, 1995	Kitt Peak	Spacewatch	·	2.4 km	MPC · JPL
344012	2011 UE_{153}	—	January 27, 2004	Kitt Peak	Spacewatch	·	1.8 km	MPC · JPL
344013	2011 UP_{343}	—	January 11, 2002	Kitt Peak	Spacewatch	·	5.1 km	MPC · JPL
344014	2011 XX_{1}	—	July 28, 2009	Kitt Peak	Spacewatch	L4	10 km	MPC · JPL
344015	2012 BW_{94}	—	April 12, 2005	Kitt Peak	Spacewatch	NYS	1.2 km	MPC · JPL
344016	2012 BO_{130}	—	August 21, 2004	Siding Spring	SSS	EOS	2.5 km	MPC · JPL
344017	2012 BW_{150}	—	April 19, 2007	Kitt Peak	Spacewatch	·	5.7 km	MPC · JPL
344018	2012 DN_{57}	—	February 10, 2008	Mount Lemmon	Mount Lemmon Survey	·	1.7 km	MPC · JPL
344019	2012 DK_{63}	—	December 19, 2003	Socorro	LINEAR	NYS	1.4 km	MPC · JPL
344020	2012 DL_{91}	—	December 21, 2006	Mount Lemmon	Mount Lemmon Survey	·	1.9 km	MPC · JPL
344021	2012 FV_{36}	—	October 23, 2006	Mount Lemmon	Mount Lemmon Survey	·	1.9 km	MPC · JPL
344022	2012 GR_{8}	—	August 19, 2006	Kitt Peak	Spacewatch	·	750 m	MPC · JPL
344023	2012 GZ_{14}	—	September 26, 2003	Apache Point	SDSS	·	3.3 km	MPC · JPL
344024	2012 GU_{33}	—	January 31, 2006	Catalina	CSS	·	3.3 km	MPC · JPL
344025	2012 HK_{41}	—	March 3, 2005	Kitt Peak	Spacewatch	(2076)	850 m	MPC · JPL
344026	2012 JP_{10}	—	October 12, 2001	Kitt Peak	Spacewatch	·	1.3 km	MPC · JPL
344027	2012 JJ_{11}	—	July 6, 2002	Palomar	NEAT	H	700 m	MPC · JPL
344028	2012 JV_{18}	—	April 2, 2006	Mount Lemmon	Mount Lemmon Survey	·	2.8 km	MPC · JPL
344029	2012 JN_{35}	—	February 13, 2002	Apache Point	SDSS	·	2.0 km	MPC · JPL
344030	2012 JA_{64}	—	September 18, 2009	Mount Lemmon	Mount Lemmon Survey	·	3.6 km	MPC · JPL
344031	2012 LZ_{13}	—	January 12, 2010	Mount Lemmon	Mount Lemmon Survey	·	3.3 km	MPC · JPL
344032	2012 LE_{20}	—	September 29, 2009	Mount Lemmon	Mount Lemmon Survey	VER	3.5 km	MPC · JPL
344033	2012 LS_{23}	—	October 30, 2005	Mount Lemmon	Mount Lemmon Survey	·	1.4 km	MPC · JPL
344034	2012 MK_{2}	—	September 9, 2001	Anderson Mesa	LONEOS	·	1.8 km	MPC · JPL
344035	2012 MQ_{5}	—	December 18, 2001	Apache Point	SDSS	EUN	1.5 km	MPC · JPL
344036	2012 MG_{11}	—	June 17, 2004	Palomar	NEAT	·	1.6 km	MPC · JPL
344037	2012 PG_{2}	—	December 7, 1999	Kitt Peak	Spacewatch	·	1.9 km	MPC · JPL
344038	2012 PH_{4}	—	September 11, 2004	Kitt Peak	Spacewatch	·	1.1 km	MPC · JPL
344039	2012 PB_{5}	—	June 22, 2006	Mount Lemmon	Mount Lemmon Survey	VER	3.8 km	MPC · JPL
344040 Davidiactor	2012 PO_{5}	Davidiactor	May 23, 2001	Cerro Tololo	Deep Ecliptic Survey	PHO	1.1 km	MPC · JPL
344041	2012 PY_{5}	—	August 24, 2005	Palomar	NEAT	·	940 m	MPC · JPL
344042	2012 PY_{8}	—	July 7, 2007	Lulin	LUSS	·	2.3 km	MPC · JPL
344043	2012 PF_{11}	—	October 26, 2008	Kitt Peak	Spacewatch	·	2.6 km	MPC · JPL
344044	2012 PB_{24}	—	September 1, 2003	Socorro	LINEAR	·	2.7 km	MPC · JPL
344045	2012 QT_{14}	—	July 10, 1978	Palomar	E. M. Shoemaker, E. F. Helin	·	2.0 km	MPC · JPL
344046	2012 QJ_{19}	—	June 24, 1995	Kitt Peak	Spacewatch	·	1.9 km	MPC · JPL
344047	4331 P-L	—	September 24, 1960	Palomar	C. J. van Houten, I. van Houten-Groeneveld, T. Gehrels	·	620 m	MPC · JPL
344048	6807 P-L	—	September 24, 1960	Palomar	C. J. van Houten, I. van Houten-Groeneveld, T. Gehrels	DOR	2.6 km	MPC · JPL
344049	6865 P-L	—	September 24, 1960	Palomar	C. J. van Houten, I. van Houten-Groeneveld, T. Gehrels	·	1.5 km	MPC · JPL
344050	1254 T-2	—	September 29, 1973	Palomar	C. J. van Houten, I. van Houten-Groeneveld, T. Gehrels	·	980 m	MPC · JPL
344051	4074 T-2	—	September 29, 1973	Palomar	C. J. van Houten, I. van Houten-Groeneveld, T. Gehrels	·	1.3 km	MPC · JPL
344052	4121 T-2	—	September 29, 1973	Palomar	C. J. van Houten, I. van Houten-Groeneveld, T. Gehrels	·	2.5 km	MPC · JPL
344053	5478 T-2	—	September 30, 1973	Palomar	C. J. van Houten, I. van Houten-Groeneveld, T. Gehrels	·	2.4 km	MPC · JPL
344054	4185 T-3	—	October 16, 1977	Palomar	C. J. van Houten, I. van Houten-Groeneveld, T. Gehrels	·	3.5 km	MPC · JPL
344055	4530 T-3	—	October 16, 1977	Palomar	C. J. van Houten, I. van Houten-Groeneveld, T. Gehrels	·	1 km	MPC · JPL
344056	1992 HT_{3}	—	April 30, 1992	San Pedro Martir	San Pedro Martir	·	3.7 km	MPC · JPL
344057	1993 QP_{8}	—	August 20, 1993	La Silla	E. W. Elst	·	2.7 km	MPC · JPL
344058	1994 PS_{22}	—	August 12, 1994	La Silla	E. W. Elst	·	1.8 km	MPC · JPL
344059	1994 SY_{8}	—	September 28, 1994	Kitt Peak	Spacewatch	·	1.1 km	MPC · JPL
344060	1995 OL	—	July 23, 1995	Ondřejov	P. Pravec	·	1.9 km	MPC · JPL
344061	1995 OL_{11}	—	July 27, 1995	Kitt Peak	Spacewatch	·	2.4 km	MPC · JPL
344062	1995 OO_{16}	—	July 26, 1995	Kitt Peak	Spacewatch	·	720 m	MPC · JPL
344063	1995 SM_{13}	—	September 18, 1995	Kitt Peak	Spacewatch	·	1.3 km	MPC · JPL
344064	1995 SB_{52}	—	September 26, 1995	Kitt Peak	Spacewatch	·	710 m	MPC · JPL
344065	1995 UB_{4}	—	October 20, 1995	Oizumi	T. Kobayashi	·	1.5 km	MPC · JPL
344066	1995 UL_{11}	—	October 17, 1995	Kitt Peak	Spacewatch	·	610 m	MPC · JPL
344067	1995 WK_{38}	—	November 23, 1995	Kitt Peak	Spacewatch	VER	3.1 km	MPC · JPL
344068	1995 YN_{8}	—	December 18, 1995	Kitt Peak	Spacewatch	·	3.2 km	MPC · JPL
344069	1996 BD_{6}	—	January 18, 1996	Kitt Peak	Spacewatch	·	860 m	MPC · JPL
344070	1996 VN_{35}	—	November 9, 1996	Kitt Peak	Spacewatch	·	2.2 km	MPC · JPL
344071	1996 XS_{16}	—	December 4, 1996	Kitt Peak	Spacewatch	·	2.3 km	MPC · JPL
344072	1997 CY_{1}	—	February 2, 1997	Kitt Peak	Spacewatch	·	690 m	MPC · JPL
344073	1997 CD_{16}	—	February 6, 1997	Kitt Peak	Spacewatch	·	3.6 km	MPC · JPL
344074	1997 UH_{9}	—	October 29, 1997	Haleakala	NEAT	ATE	560 m	MPC · JPL
344075	1997 WK_{9}	—	November 21, 1997	Kitt Peak	Spacewatch	·	1.3 km	MPC · JPL
344076	1998 HJ_{3}	—	April 19, 1998	Socorro	LINEAR	APO · PHA	570 m	MPC · JPL
344077	1998 HG_{8}	—	April 21, 1998	Kitt Peak	Spacewatch	·	820 m	MPC · JPL
344078	1998 QB_{29}	—	August 25, 1998	Ondřejov	L. Kotková	·	1.1 km	MPC · JPL
344079	1998 RO_{8}	—	September 13, 1998	Kitt Peak	Spacewatch	·	960 m	MPC · JPL
344080	1998 RP_{36}	—	September 14, 1998	Socorro	LINEAR	·	2.1 km	MPC · JPL
344081	1998 SP_{16}	—	September 17, 1998	Kitt Peak	Spacewatch	·	1.8 km	MPC · JPL
344082	1998 SF_{21}	—	September 21, 1998	Kitt Peak	Spacewatch	AGN	1.1 km	MPC · JPL
344083	1998 TX_{11}	—	October 13, 1998	Kitt Peak	Spacewatch	HOF	2.8 km	MPC · JPL
344084	1998 TZ_{27}	—	October 15, 1998	Kitt Peak	Spacewatch	AEO	1.3 km	MPC · JPL
344085	1998 UA_{45}	—	October 22, 1998	Kitt Peak	Spacewatch	(2076)	820 m	MPC · JPL
344086	1999 AW_{11}	—	January 7, 1999	Kitt Peak	Spacewatch	·	1.1 km	MPC · JPL
344087	1999 CA_{130}	—	February 6, 1999	Mauna Kea	Veillet, C.	·	1.0 km	MPC · JPL
344088	1999 CL_{152}	—	February 12, 1999	Kitt Peak	Spacewatch	·	1.8 km	MPC · JPL
344089	1999 JN_{47}	—	May 10, 1999	Socorro	LINEAR	·	2.1 km	MPC · JPL
344090	1999 JK_{133}	—	May 14, 1999	Socorro	LINEAR	PHO	1.3 km	MPC · JPL
344091	1999 LG_{7}	—	June 11, 1999	Kitt Peak	Spacewatch	·	1.7 km	MPC · JPL
344092	1999 NK_{2}	—	July 12, 1999	Socorro	LINEAR	EUN	2.2 km	MPC · JPL
344093	1999 RB_{19}	—	September 6, 1999	Anderson Mesa	LONEOS	·	1.0 km	MPC · JPL
344094	1999 RD_{126}	—	September 9, 1999	Socorro	LINEAR	(5)	1.7 km	MPC · JPL
344095	1999 RG_{153}	—	September 9, 1999	Socorro	LINEAR	·	820 m	MPC · JPL
344096	1999 RL_{237}	—	September 8, 1999	Catalina	CSS	·	1.6 km	MPC · JPL
344097	1999 RJ_{252}	—	September 7, 1999	Kitt Peak	Spacewatch	(5)	1.1 km	MPC · JPL
344098	1999 SG_{18}	—	September 13, 1999	Socorro	LINEAR	(1547)	2.4 km	MPC · JPL
344099	1999 TC_{25}	—	October 2, 1999	Socorro	LINEAR	·	1.6 km	MPC · JPL
344100	1999 TK_{30}	—	October 4, 1999	Socorro	LINEAR	·	2.9 km	MPC · JPL

== 344101–344200 ==
back to top

Designation			Discovery			Properties		Ref
Permanent	Provisional	Named after	Date	Site	Discoverer(s)	Category	Diam.	Ref
344101	1999 TR_{59}	—	October 7, 1999	Kitt Peak	Spacewatch	·	1.4 km	MPC · JPL
344102	1999 TT_{94}	—	October 2, 1999	Socorro	LINEAR	·	2.1 km	MPC · JPL
344103	1999 TD_{127}	—	October 4, 1999	Socorro	LINEAR	·	1.9 km	MPC · JPL
344104	1999 TH_{148}	—	October 7, 1999	Socorro	LINEAR	·	1.4 km	MPC · JPL
344105	1999 TD_{150}	—	October 7, 1999	Socorro	LINEAR	EUN	1.2 km	MPC · JPL
344106	1999 TH_{237}	—	October 4, 1999	Kitt Peak	Spacewatch	·	1.8 km	MPC · JPL
344107	1999 TA_{242}	—	October 4, 1999	Catalina	CSS	·	2.7 km	MPC · JPL
344108	1999 TB_{255}	—	October 13, 1999	Socorro	LINEAR	RAF	1.1 km	MPC · JPL
344109	1999 TF_{264}	—	October 15, 1999	Kitt Peak	Spacewatch	·	540 m	MPC · JPL
344110	1999 TR_{305}	—	October 3, 1999	Catalina	CSS	EUN	1.5 km	MPC · JPL
344111	1999 UB_{28}	—	October 30, 1999	Kitt Peak	Spacewatch	·	1.9 km	MPC · JPL
344112	1999 VD_{4}	—	November 1, 1999	Catalina	CSS	·	1.7 km	MPC · JPL
344113	1999 VJ_{41}	—	November 1, 1999	Kitt Peak	Spacewatch	·	1.9 km	MPC · JPL
344114	1999 VU_{54}	—	October 10, 1999	Socorro	LINEAR	·	1.5 km	MPC · JPL
344115	1999 VV_{71}	—	November 15, 1999	Eskridge	Farpoint	·	1.4 km	MPC · JPL
344116	1999 VB_{83}	—	October 6, 1999	Kitt Peak	Spacewatch	HNS	1.4 km	MPC · JPL
344117	1999 VF_{116}	—	November 4, 1999	Kitt Peak	Spacewatch	·	1.6 km	MPC · JPL
344118	1999 VN_{122}	—	November 4, 1999	Kitt Peak	Spacewatch	·	1.1 km	MPC · JPL
344119	1999 VF_{130}	—	November 11, 1999	Kitt Peak	Spacewatch	EUN	1.5 km	MPC · JPL
344120	1999 VM_{142}	—	November 10, 1999	Kitt Peak	Spacewatch	·	1.5 km	MPC · JPL
344121	1999 VD_{143}	—	October 1, 1999	Kitt Peak	Spacewatch	·	840 m	MPC · JPL
344122	1999 VP_{185}	—	October 30, 1999	Kitt Peak	Spacewatch	EUN	1.5 km	MPC · JPL
344123	1999 VC_{197}	—	October 8, 1999	Socorro	LINEAR	·	2.2 km	MPC · JPL
344124	1999 VB_{212}	—	November 12, 1999	Socorro	LINEAR	·	710 m	MPC · JPL
344125	1999 XD_{9}	—	December 5, 1999	Socorro	LINEAR	HNS	1.8 km	MPC · JPL
344126	1999 XC_{17}	—	December 7, 1999	Socorro	LINEAR	H	850 m	MPC · JPL
344127	1999 XO_{24}	—	December 6, 1999	Socorro	LINEAR	·	1.9 km	MPC · JPL
344128	1999 XR_{49}	—	December 7, 1999	Socorro	LINEAR	·	1.5 km	MPC · JPL
344129	1999 XW_{148}	—	December 7, 1999	Kitt Peak	Spacewatch	·	850 m	MPC · JPL
344130	1999 XW_{235}	—	December 3, 1999	Kitt Peak	Spacewatch	CYB	4.9 km	MPC · JPL
344131	1999 YE_{10}	—	December 27, 1999	Kitt Peak	Spacewatch	·	1.5 km	MPC · JPL
344132	1999 YP_{13}	—	December 31, 1999	Socorro	LINEAR	·	3.2 km	MPC · JPL
344133	2000 AD_{6}	—	January 4, 2000	Socorro	LINEAR	AMO	660 m	MPC · JPL
344134	2000 AS_{169}	—	January 7, 2000	Socorro	LINEAR	·	3.5 km	MPC · JPL
344135	2000 BO_{40}	—	January 28, 2000	Kitt Peak	Spacewatch	·	2.1 km	MPC · JPL
344136	2000 CF_{24}	—	February 2, 2000	Socorro	LINEAR	·	1.8 km	MPC · JPL
344137	2000 DG_{22}	—	February 29, 2000	Socorro	LINEAR	·	2.0 km	MPC · JPL
344138	2000 ES_{153}	—	March 6, 2000	Haleakala	NEAT	·	2.6 km	MPC · JPL
344139	2000 GX_{139}	—	April 4, 2000	Anderson Mesa	LONEOS	·	2.4 km	MPC · JPL
344140	2000 HB_{46}	—	April 29, 2000	Socorro	LINEAR	H	630 m	MPC · JPL
344141	2000 HS_{66}	—	April 26, 2000	Kitt Peak	Spacewatch	·	2.0 km	MPC · JPL
344142	2000 HL_{102}	—	April 26, 2000	Anderson Mesa	LONEOS	·	1.1 km	MPC · JPL
344143	2000 JQ_{3}	—	May 4, 2000	Socorro	LINEAR	AMO	740 m	MPC · JPL
344144	2000 KA_{22}	—	May 28, 2000	Socorro	LINEAR	NYS	1.2 km	MPC · JPL
344145	2000 KX_{37}	—	May 24, 2000	Kitt Peak	Spacewatch	AGN	1.5 km	MPC · JPL
344146	2000 NP_{11}	—	July 10, 2000	Anderson Mesa	LONEOS	·	4.4 km	MPC · JPL
344147	2000 PK_{8}	—	August 3, 2000	Socorro	LINEAR	·	1.2 km	MPC · JPL
344148	2000 QD_{43}	—	August 24, 2000	Socorro	LINEAR	·	1.3 km	MPC · JPL
344149	2000 QH_{148}	—	August 27, 2000	Kvistaberg	Uppsala-DLR Asteroid Survey	·	1.7 km	MPC · JPL
344150	2000 QV_{159}	—	August 31, 2000	Socorro	LINEAR	·	800 m	MPC · JPL
344151	2000 SV_{4}	—	September 20, 2000	Socorro	LINEAR	·	600 m	MPC · JPL
344152	2000 SS_{50}	—	September 23, 2000	Socorro	LINEAR	·	1.4 km	MPC · JPL
344153	2000 SU_{56}	—	September 24, 2000	Socorro	LINEAR	·	1.3 km	MPC · JPL
344154	2000 TN_{57}	—	October 2, 2000	Anderson Mesa	LONEOS	·	1.7 km	MPC · JPL
344155	2000 UE_{66}	—	October 25, 2000	Socorro	LINEAR	·	1.6 km	MPC · JPL
344156	2000 VJ_{43}	—	November 1, 2000	Socorro	LINEAR	·	1.6 km	MPC · JPL
344157	2000 WS_{52}	—	November 27, 2000	Kitt Peak	Spacewatch	·	1.4 km	MPC · JPL
344158	2000 WV_{66}	—	November 21, 2000	Socorro	LINEAR	HNS	1.7 km	MPC · JPL
344159	2000 WY_{120}	—	November 20, 2000	Socorro	LINEAR	·	2.2 km	MPC · JPL
344160	2000 WS_{155}	—	November 30, 2000	Socorro	LINEAR	·	1.8 km	MPC · JPL
344161	2000 YK_{18}	—	December 20, 2000	Socorro	LINEAR	·	1.7 km	MPC · JPL
344162	2000 YL_{30}	—	December 22, 2000	Kitt Peak	Spacewatch	·	1.7 km	MPC · JPL
344163	2000 YZ_{49}	—	December 30, 2000	Socorro	LINEAR	·	2.2 km	MPC · JPL
344164	2000 YF_{61}	—	December 30, 2000	Socorro	LINEAR	·	1.6 km	MPC · JPL
344165	2000 YN_{87}	—	December 30, 2000	Socorro	LINEAR	·	1.8 km	MPC · JPL
344166	2000 YK_{90}	—	December 30, 2000	Socorro	LINEAR	·	2.0 km	MPC · JPL
344167	2000 YT_{95}	—	December 30, 2000	Socorro	LINEAR	MAR	1.9 km	MPC · JPL
344168	2000 YU_{139}	—	December 27, 2000	Kitt Peak	Spacewatch	·	2.5 km	MPC · JPL
344169	2001 AD_{1}	—	January 1, 2001	Kitt Peak	Spacewatch	·	1.6 km	MPC · JPL
344170	2001 AF_{36}	—	January 5, 2001	Socorro	LINEAR	H	580 m	MPC · JPL
344171	2001 AA_{47}	—	January 15, 2001	Socorro	LINEAR	BAR	1.3 km	MPC · JPL
344172	2001 AV_{49}	—	January 14, 2001	Kitt Peak	Spacewatch	(1547)	1.8 km	MPC · JPL
344173	2001 BS_{24}	—	January 20, 2001	Socorro	LINEAR	·	2.2 km	MPC · JPL
344174	2001 BF_{30}	—	January 20, 2001	Socorro	LINEAR	·	2.9 km	MPC · JPL
344175	2001 BO_{30}	—	January 20, 2001	Socorro	LINEAR	·	1.2 km	MPC · JPL
344176	2001 BU_{52}	—	January 17, 2001	Haleakala	NEAT	·	2.1 km	MPC · JPL
344177	2001 BV_{53}	—	January 18, 2001	Socorro	LINEAR	H	650 m	MPC · JPL
344178	2001 CD_{13}	—	February 1, 2001	Socorro	LINEAR	·	1.4 km	MPC · JPL
344179	2001 DX_{7}	—	February 18, 2001	Eskridge	Farpoint	·	1.7 km	MPC · JPL
344180	2001 DP_{9}	—	February 16, 2001	Socorro	LINEAR	·	1.8 km	MPC · JPL
344181	2001 DR_{15}	—	February 16, 2001	Socorro	LINEAR	·	1.6 km	MPC · JPL
344182	2001 DT_{27}	—	February 17, 2001	Socorro	LINEAR	·	2.1 km	MPC · JPL
344183	2001 DC_{100}	—	February 17, 2001	Haleakala	NEAT	(5)	1.9 km	MPC · JPL
344184	2001 DT_{105}	—	February 16, 2001	Anderson Mesa	LONEOS	·	1.8 km	MPC · JPL
344185	2001 DE_{106}	—	February 20, 2001	Socorro	LINEAR	L4	10 km	MPC · JPL
344186	2001 FD_{96}	—	March 16, 2001	Socorro	LINEAR	·	2.0 km	MPC · JPL
344187	2001 FK_{202}	—	March 21, 2001	Kitt Peak	SKADS	·	1.5 km	MPC · JPL
344188	2001 HW_{24}	—	April 15, 2001	Socorro	LINEAR	·	960 m	MPC · JPL
344189	2001 HJ_{61}	—	April 24, 2001	Kitt Peak	Spacewatch	·	3.1 km	MPC · JPL
344190	2001 JO_{10}	—	May 15, 2001	Anderson Mesa	LONEOS	·	960 m	MPC · JPL
344191	2001 KB_{18}	—	May 20, 2001	Ondřejov	P. Pravec, P. Kušnirák	·	1.2 km	MPC · JPL
344192	2001 LX_{16}	—	June 15, 2001	Socorro	LINEAR	·	1.0 km	MPC · JPL
344193	2001 NV_{5}	—	July 13, 2001	Palomar	NEAT	·	810 m	MPC · JPL
344194	2001 OZ_{22}	—	July 19, 2001	Palomar	NEAT	H	730 m	MPC · JPL
344195	2001 OS_{28}	—	July 18, 2001	Palomar	NEAT	·	880 m	MPC · JPL
344196	2001 OY_{34}	—	July 19, 2001	Palomar	NEAT	·	1.5 km	MPC · JPL
344197	2001 OS_{94}	—	January 13, 1999	Kitt Peak	Spacewatch	KON	3.4 km	MPC · JPL
344198	2001 PU_{34}	—	August 10, 2001	Palomar	NEAT	EOS	2.2 km	MPC · JPL
344199	2001 PF_{41}	—	August 11, 2001	Palomar	NEAT	·	1.3 km	MPC · JPL
344200	2001 QR_{5}	—	August 16, 2001	Socorro	LINEAR	NYS	1.1 km	MPC · JPL

== 344201–344300 ==
back to top

Designation			Discovery			Properties		Ref
Permanent	Provisional	Named after	Date	Site	Discoverer(s)	Category	Diam.	Ref
344201	2001 QB_{107}	—	August 22, 2001	Socorro	LINEAR	H	750 m	MPC · JPL
344202	2001 QJ_{111}	—	July 30, 2001	Socorro	LINEAR	·	1.4 km	MPC · JPL
344203	2001 QR_{123}	—	August 19, 2001	Socorro	LINEAR	·	1.0 km	MPC · JPL
344204	2001 QO_{149}	—	August 22, 2001	Haleakala	NEAT	·	4.3 km	MPC · JPL
344205	2001 QY_{149}	—	August 25, 2001	Palomar	NEAT	ERI	2.1 km	MPC · JPL
344206	2001 QZ_{154}	—	August 23, 2001	Anderson Mesa	LONEOS	LIX	3.7 km	MPC · JPL
344207	2001 QD_{177}	—	August 26, 2001	Kitt Peak	Spacewatch	·	1.7 km	MPC · JPL
344208	2001 QC_{252}	—	August 25, 2001	Socorro	LINEAR	·	880 m	MPC · JPL
344209	2001 QZ_{265}	—	August 20, 2001	Palomar	NEAT	·	3.6 km	MPC · JPL
344210	2001 QV_{292}	—	August 16, 2001	Palomar	NEAT	·	2.7 km	MPC · JPL
344211	2001 QE_{333}	—	August 17, 2001	Socorro	LINEAR	·	1.1 km	MPC · JPL
344212	2001 RL_{9}	—	September 8, 2001	Socorro	LINEAR	H	760 m	MPC · JPL
344213	2001 RL_{31}	—	September 6, 2001	Palomar	NEAT	·	2.4 km	MPC · JPL
344214	2001 RH_{36}	—	August 20, 2001	Socorro	LINEAR	·	1.3 km	MPC · JPL
344215	2001 RW_{42}	—	September 6, 2001	Palomar	NEAT	·	1.2 km	MPC · JPL
344216	2001 RB_{54}	—	September 12, 2001	Socorro	LINEAR	·	1.6 km	MPC · JPL
344217	2001 RJ_{57}	—	September 12, 2001	Socorro	LINEAR	·	1.2 km	MPC · JPL
344218	2001 RK_{65}	—	September 10, 2001	Socorro	LINEAR	·	1.2 km	MPC · JPL
344219	2001 RT_{69}	—	September 10, 2001	Socorro	LINEAR	·	1.2 km	MPC · JPL
344220	2001 RV_{83}	—	September 11, 2001	Anderson Mesa	LONEOS	·	1.3 km	MPC · JPL
344221	2001 RY_{89}	—	September 11, 2001	Anderson Mesa	LONEOS	NYS	1.1 km	MPC · JPL
344222	2001 RK_{106}	—	September 12, 2001	Socorro	LINEAR	·	1.9 km	MPC · JPL
344223	2001 RY_{106}	—	September 12, 2001	Socorro	LINEAR	·	1.0 km	MPC · JPL
344224	2001 RK_{120}	—	September 12, 2001	Socorro	LINEAR	MAS	640 m	MPC · JPL
344225	2001 RU_{122}	—	September 12, 2001	Socorro	LINEAR	·	2.1 km	MPC · JPL
344226	2001 RE_{138}	—	September 12, 2001	Socorro	LINEAR	·	2.3 km	MPC · JPL
344227	2001 RA_{146}	—	September 8, 2001	Socorro	LINEAR	·	3.4 km	MPC · JPL
344228	2001 RN_{154}	—	September 11, 2001	Anderson Mesa	LONEOS	·	2.6 km	MPC · JPL
344229	2001 SC	—	September 16, 2001	Emerald Lane	L. Ball	·	1.8 km	MPC · JPL
344230	2001 SR_{10}	—	September 16, 2001	Socorro	LINEAR	T_{j} (2.98) · EUP	5.6 km	MPC · JPL
344231	2001 SX_{14}	—	September 16, 2001	Socorro	LINEAR	·	1.2 km	MPC · JPL
344232	2001 SO_{25}	—	September 16, 2001	Socorro	LINEAR	·	950 m	MPC · JPL
344233	2001 SQ_{41}	—	September 16, 2001	Socorro	LINEAR	·	2.4 km	MPC · JPL
344234	2001 SJ_{120}	—	September 16, 2001	Socorro	LINEAR	·	2.4 km	MPC · JPL
344235	2001 SA_{124}	—	September 16, 2001	Socorro	LINEAR	·	1.1 km	MPC · JPL
344236	2001 SC_{127}	—	August 22, 2001	Kitt Peak	Spacewatch	·	760 m	MPC · JPL
344237	2001 SG_{137}	—	September 16, 2001	Socorro	LINEAR	·	1.4 km	MPC · JPL
344238	2001 SW_{138}	—	September 16, 2001	Socorro	LINEAR	·	2.8 km	MPC · JPL
344239	2001 ST_{140}	—	September 16, 2001	Socorro	LINEAR	NYS	890 m	MPC · JPL
344240	2001 SV_{143}	—	September 16, 2001	Socorro	LINEAR	·	3.2 km	MPC · JPL
344241	2001 SQ_{145}	—	September 16, 2001	Socorro	LINEAR	·	3.0 km	MPC · JPL
344242	2001 SA_{147}	—	September 16, 2001	Socorro	LINEAR	·	970 m	MPC · JPL
344243	2001 SO_{147}	—	September 17, 2001	Socorro	LINEAR	·	990 m	MPC · JPL
344244	2001 SD_{148}	—	September 17, 2001	Socorro	LINEAR	·	1.2 km	MPC · JPL
344245	2001 SQ_{155}	—	September 17, 2001	Socorro	LINEAR	·	3.1 km	MPC · JPL
344246	2001 SN_{159}	—	September 17, 2001	Socorro	LINEAR	·	1.3 km	MPC · JPL
344247	2001 SL_{179}	—	September 17, 2001	Socorro	LINEAR	·	6.0 km	MPC · JPL
344248	2001 SN_{202}	—	September 19, 2001	Socorro	LINEAR	MAS	630 m	MPC · JPL
344249	2001 SS_{241}	—	September 19, 2001	Socorro	LINEAR	·	3.1 km	MPC · JPL
344250	2001 SL_{242}	—	September 19, 2001	Socorro	LINEAR	V	670 m	MPC · JPL
344251	2001 SV_{244}	—	September 19, 2001	Socorro	LINEAR	THM	2.6 km	MPC · JPL
344252	2001 ST_{247}	—	September 19, 2001	Socorro	LINEAR	ERI	1.4 km	MPC · JPL
344253	2001 SH_{249}	—	September 19, 2001	Socorro	LINEAR	NYS	1.2 km	MPC · JPL
344254	2001 SU_{251}	—	September 19, 2001	Socorro	LINEAR	V	800 m	MPC · JPL
344255	2001 SQ_{262}	—	August 26, 2001	Socorro	LINEAR	H	490 m	MPC · JPL
344256	2001 SR_{274}	—	September 20, 2001	Kitt Peak	Spacewatch	·	2.4 km	MPC · JPL
344257	2001 SL_{290}	—	September 29, 2001	Palomar	NEAT	·	2.4 km	MPC · JPL
344258	2001 SE_{295}	—	September 20, 2001	Socorro	LINEAR	·	1.1 km	MPC · JPL
344259	2001 SF_{303}	—	September 12, 2001	Kitt Peak	Spacewatch	·	2.9 km	MPC · JPL
344260	2001 SG_{305}	—	September 20, 2001	Socorro	LINEAR	EOS	2.0 km	MPC · JPL
344261	2001 SK_{311}	—	September 19, 2001	Socorro	LINEAR	TEL	1.9 km	MPC · JPL
344262	2001 SJ_{313}	—	September 21, 2001	Socorro	LINEAR	THB	3.8 km	MPC · JPL
344263	2001 SZ_{323}	—	September 25, 2001	Socorro	LINEAR	EOS	2.3 km	MPC · JPL
344264	2001 SL_{329}	—	September 19, 2001	Socorro	LINEAR	EOS	1.8 km	MPC · JPL
344265	2001 SA_{338}	—	September 20, 2001	Socorro	LINEAR	·	1.1 km	MPC · JPL
344266	2001 SA_{343}	—	September 22, 2001	Palomar	NEAT	PHO	1.3 km	MPC · JPL
344267	2001 SE_{349}	—	September 21, 2001	Socorro	LINEAR	EUP	3.2 km	MPC · JPL
344268	2001 SU_{349}	—	September 19, 2001	Anderson Mesa	LONEOS	·	3.3 km	MPC · JPL
344269	2001 SJ_{354}	—	September 24, 2001	Palomar	NEAT	·	2.4 km	MPC · JPL
344270	2001 SZ_{354}	—	September 18, 2001	Anderson Mesa	LONEOS	·	1.2 km	MPC · JPL
344271	2001 TE_{19}	—	October 8, 2001	Socorro	LINEAR	TIR	2.9 km	MPC · JPL
344272	2001 TR_{45}	—	October 14, 2001	Needville	Needville	V	730 m	MPC · JPL
344273	2001 TD_{48}	—	October 9, 2001	Kitt Peak	Spacewatch	·	2.7 km	MPC · JPL
344274	2001 TQ_{50}	—	October 13, 2001	Socorro	LINEAR	·	3.1 km	MPC · JPL
344275	2001 TF_{62}	—	October 13, 2001	Socorro	LINEAR	·	1.1 km	MPC · JPL
344276	2001 TD_{146}	—	October 10, 2001	Palomar	NEAT	·	1.1 km	MPC · JPL
344277	2001 TX_{151}	—	October 10, 2001	Palomar	NEAT	·	1.3 km	MPC · JPL
344278	2001 TM_{153}	—	September 16, 2001	Socorro	LINEAR	EMA	3.8 km	MPC · JPL
344279	2001 TO_{167}	—	October 15, 2001	Socorro	LINEAR	·	1.8 km	MPC · JPL
344280	2001 TV_{174}	—	October 15, 2001	Socorro	LINEAR	·	2.6 km	MPC · JPL
344281	2001 TY_{175}	—	October 14, 2001	Socorro	LINEAR	·	2.8 km	MPC · JPL
344282	2001 TV_{176}	—	October 14, 2001	Socorro	LINEAR	·	1.0 km	MPC · JPL
344283	2001 TZ_{179}	—	October 7, 2001	Palomar	NEAT	·	3.3 km	MPC · JPL
344284	2001 TL_{192}	—	October 14, 2001	Socorro	LINEAR	·	1.1 km	MPC · JPL
344285	2001 TM_{199}	—	October 11, 2001	Socorro	LINEAR	·	1.3 km	MPC · JPL
344286	2001 TG_{215}	—	September 22, 2001	Anderson Mesa	LONEOS	·	2.9 km	MPC · JPL
344287	2001 TD_{226}	—	October 14, 2001	Palomar	NEAT	·	3.5 km	MPC · JPL
344288	2001 TZ_{251}	—	October 14, 2001	Apache Point	SDSS	·	4.0 km	MPC · JPL
344289	2001 TX_{254}	—	October 14, 2001	Apache Point	SDSS	EOS	2.3 km	MPC · JPL
344290	2001 TV_{256}	—	October 15, 2001	Palomar	NEAT	V	780 m	MPC · JPL
344291	2001 UQ_{4}	—	October 21, 2001	Emerald Lane	L. Ball	NYS	1.0 km	MPC · JPL
344292	2001 UK_{12}	—	October 24, 2001	Desert Eagle	W. K. Y. Yeung	NYS	1.4 km	MPC · JPL
344293	2001 US_{23}	—	October 18, 2001	Socorro	LINEAR	·	1.6 km	MPC · JPL
344294	2001 UQ_{37}	—	October 17, 2001	Socorro	LINEAR	·	3.2 km	MPC · JPL
344295	2001 UE_{54}	—	October 18, 2001	Socorro	LINEAR	V	730 m	MPC · JPL
344296	2001 UH_{58}	—	October 11, 2001	Palomar	NEAT	NYS	910 m	MPC · JPL
344297	2001 UV_{61}	—	October 17, 2001	Socorro	LINEAR	EOS	2.7 km	MPC · JPL
344298	2001 UX_{65}	—	October 18, 2001	Socorro	LINEAR	·	4.3 km	MPC · JPL
344299	2001 UB_{77}	—	October 17, 2001	Socorro	LINEAR	·	2.8 km	MPC · JPL
344300	2001 US_{86}	—	October 18, 2001	Kitt Peak	Spacewatch	NYS	990 m	MPC · JPL

== 344301–344400 ==
back to top

Designation			Discovery			Properties		Ref
Permanent	Provisional	Named after	Date	Site	Discoverer(s)	Category	Diam.	Ref
344301	2001 UM_{87}	—	October 21, 2001	Kitt Peak	Spacewatch	·	780 m	MPC · JPL
344302	2001 UA_{103}	—	October 20, 2001	Socorro	LINEAR	MAS	680 m	MPC · JPL
344303	2001 UN_{111}	—	October 21, 2001	Socorro	LINEAR	·	2.7 km	MPC · JPL
344304	2001 UR_{114}	—	October 22, 2001	Socorro	LINEAR	·	3.1 km	MPC · JPL
344305	2001 UZ_{129}	—	October 20, 2001	Socorro	LINEAR	·	2.8 km	MPC · JPL
344306	2001 UR_{130}	—	October 18, 2001	Palomar	NEAT	·	1.0 km	MPC · JPL
344307	2001 UU_{130}	—	October 20, 2001	Socorro	LINEAR	THM	2.3 km	MPC · JPL
344308	2001 UO_{135}	—	October 22, 2001	Socorro	LINEAR	EOS	2.6 km	MPC · JPL
344309	2001 UX_{144}	—	October 23, 2001	Socorro	LINEAR	·	1.1 km	MPC · JPL
344310	2001 UL_{146}	—	October 23, 2001	Socorro	LINEAR	MAS	650 m	MPC · JPL
344311	2001 UZ_{159}	—	October 23, 2001	Socorro	LINEAR	·	1.6 km	MPC · JPL
344312	2001 UR_{170}	—	October 21, 2001	Socorro	LINEAR	·	1.1 km	MPC · JPL
344313	2001 UJ_{177}	—	October 11, 2001	Palomar	NEAT	·	3.6 km	MPC · JPL
344314	2001 UO_{194}	—	October 18, 2001	Palomar	NEAT	·	2.9 km	MPC · JPL
344315	2001 UL_{199}	—	October 14, 2001	Socorro	LINEAR	·	3.2 km	MPC · JPL
344316	2001 UD_{201}	—	October 19, 2001	Palomar	NEAT	·	2.7 km	MPC · JPL
344317	2001 UK_{202}	—	October 21, 2001	Socorro	LINEAR	EOS	2.2 km	MPC · JPL
344318	2001 US_{205}	—	October 19, 2001	Palomar	NEAT	EMA	3.8 km	MPC · JPL
344319	2001 UY_{206}	—	October 20, 2001	Socorro	LINEAR	·	1.5 km	MPC · JPL
344320	2001 UC_{215}	—	October 23, 2001	Socorro	LINEAR	THM	2.6 km	MPC · JPL
344321	2001 UF_{221}	—	October 23, 2001	Socorro	LINEAR	·	1.3 km	MPC · JPL
344322	2001 US_{222}	—	October 23, 2001	Kitt Peak	Spacewatch	·	3.4 km	MPC · JPL
344323	2001 UT_{224}	—	October 25, 2001	Socorro	LINEAR	·	1.9 km	MPC · JPL
344324	2001 UE_{225}	—	October 25, 2001	Socorro	LINEAR	·	4.2 km	MPC · JPL
344325	2001 VU_{8}	—	November 9, 2001	Socorro	LINEAR	·	4.0 km	MPC · JPL
344326	2001 VX_{13}	—	November 10, 2001	Socorro	LINEAR	·	1.3 km	MPC · JPL
344327	2001 VR_{38}	—	November 9, 2001	Socorro	LINEAR	V	840 m	MPC · JPL
344328	2001 VZ_{39}	—	November 9, 2001	Socorro	LINEAR	·	1.6 km	MPC · JPL
344329	2001 VZ_{41}	—	November 9, 2001	Socorro	LINEAR	·	4.3 km	MPC · JPL
344330	2001 VW_{72}	—	November 12, 2001	Kitt Peak	Spacewatch	·	2.2 km	MPC · JPL
344331	2001 VY_{72}	—	November 12, 2001	Kitt Peak	Spacewatch	MAS	620 m	MPC · JPL
344332	2001 VL_{75}	—	November 12, 2001	Socorro	LINEAR	·	2.1 km	MPC · JPL
344333	2001 VE_{89}	—	November 12, 2001	Socorro	LINEAR	V	690 m	MPC · JPL
344334	2001 VW_{92}	—	November 15, 2001	Socorro	LINEAR	·	4.1 km	MPC · JPL
344335	2001 VC_{96}	—	November 15, 2001	Socorro	LINEAR	THB	3.5 km	MPC · JPL
344336	2001 VP_{98}	—	November 15, 2001	Socorro	LINEAR	T_{j} (2.98)	4.8 km	MPC · JPL
344337	2001 VB_{104}	—	November 12, 2001	Socorro	LINEAR	NYS	1.2 km	MPC · JPL
344338	2001 VG_{114}	—	November 12, 2001	Socorro	LINEAR	TIR	3.8 km	MPC · JPL
344339	2001 VH_{127}	—	November 11, 2001	Apache Point	SDSS	EOS	2.2 km	MPC · JPL
344340	2001 VG_{132}	—	November 12, 2001	Apache Point	SDSS	L5	9.4 km	MPC · JPL
344341	2001 WR_{8}	—	November 17, 2001	Socorro	LINEAR	·	3.4 km	MPC · JPL
344342	2001 WZ_{15}	—	November 26, 2001	Socorro	LINEAR	PHO	2.1 km	MPC · JPL
344343	2001 WY_{25}	—	November 17, 2001	Socorro	LINEAR	MAS	670 m	MPC · JPL
344344	2001 WB_{26}	—	November 17, 2001	Socorro	LINEAR	·	1.3 km	MPC · JPL
344345	2001 WL_{32}	—	November 17, 2001	Socorro	LINEAR	NYS	1.4 km	MPC · JPL
344346	2001 WX_{33}	—	November 17, 2001	Socorro	LINEAR	V	820 m	MPC · JPL
344347	2001 WZ_{34}	—	November 17, 2001	Socorro	LINEAR	NYS	1.1 km	MPC · JPL
344348	2001 WS_{48}	—	November 19, 2001	Anderson Mesa	LONEOS	·	4.8 km	MPC · JPL
344349	2001 WX_{54}	—	November 19, 2001	Socorro	LINEAR	·	4.6 km	MPC · JPL
344350	2001 WQ_{56}	—	October 21, 2001	Socorro	LINEAR	·	1.4 km	MPC · JPL
344351	2001 WV_{62}	—	November 19, 2001	Socorro	LINEAR	HYG	3.5 km	MPC · JPL
344352	2001 WS_{68}	—	November 20, 2001	Socorro	LINEAR	·	3.9 km	MPC · JPL
344353	2001 WN_{74}	—	October 13, 2001	Kitt Peak	Spacewatch	·	2.4 km	MPC · JPL
344354	2001 WP_{75}	—	November 20, 2001	Socorro	LINEAR	MAS	680 m	MPC · JPL
344355	2001 WK_{81}	—	November 20, 2001	Socorro	LINEAR	MAS	850 m	MPC · JPL
344356	2001 WV_{84}	—	November 20, 2001	Socorro	LINEAR	THM	2.2 km	MPC · JPL
344357	2001 WP_{90}	—	November 21, 2001	Socorro	LINEAR	·	3.2 km	MPC · JPL
344358	2001 XD_{20}	—	December 9, 2001	Socorro	LINEAR	LIX	4.4 km	MPC · JPL
344359	2001 XH_{32}	—	December 7, 2001	Kitt Peak	Spacewatch	·	3.0 km	MPC · JPL
344360	2001 XX_{32}	—	December 10, 2001	Kitt Peak	Spacewatch	MAS	630 m	MPC · JPL
344361	2001 XC_{36}	—	December 9, 2001	Socorro	LINEAR	TIR	3.8 km	MPC · JPL
344362	2001 XQ_{76}	—	December 11, 2001	Socorro	LINEAR	·	1.3 km	MPC · JPL
344363	2001 XZ_{94}	—	December 10, 2001	Socorro	LINEAR	EUP	4.8 km	MPC · JPL
344364	2001 XX_{96}	—	December 10, 2001	Socorro	LINEAR	TIR	5.7 km	MPC · JPL
344365	2001 XL_{110}	—	December 11, 2001	Socorro	LINEAR	·	1.5 km	MPC · JPL
344366	2001 XE_{120}	—	December 14, 2001	Socorro	LINEAR	V	780 m	MPC · JPL
344367	2001 XZ_{123}	—	December 14, 2001	Socorro	LINEAR	THM	2.4 km	MPC · JPL
344368	2001 XF_{125}	—	December 14, 2001	Socorro	LINEAR	THM	2.7 km	MPC · JPL
344369	2001 XN_{129}	—	December 14, 2001	Socorro	LINEAR	·	1.1 km	MPC · JPL
344370	2001 XT_{137}	—	December 14, 2001	Socorro	LINEAR	NYS	1.2 km	MPC · JPL
344371	2001 XP_{143}	—	December 14, 2001	Socorro	LINEAR	NYS	940 m	MPC · JPL
344372	2001 XZ_{143}	—	December 14, 2001	Socorro	LINEAR	V	820 m	MPC · JPL
344373	2001 XU_{149}	—	December 14, 2001	Socorro	LINEAR	·	4.5 km	MPC · JPL
344374	2001 XO_{154}	—	December 14, 2001	Socorro	LINEAR	VER	3.8 km	MPC · JPL
344375	2001 XQ_{169}	—	December 14, 2001	Socorro	LINEAR	NYS	1.4 km	MPC · JPL
344376	2001 XJ_{201}	—	December 13, 2001	Bergisch Gladbach	W. Bickel	·	3.6 km	MPC · JPL
344377	2001 XD_{203}	—	December 11, 2001	Socorro	LINEAR	·	1.5 km	MPC · JPL
344378	2001 XK_{203}	—	December 11, 2001	Socorro	LINEAR	ERI	1.6 km	MPC · JPL
344379	2001 XD_{212}	—	December 11, 2001	Socorro	LINEAR	·	1.6 km	MPC · JPL
344380	2001 XO_{214}	—	December 11, 2001	Socorro	LINEAR	EUP	5.5 km	MPC · JPL
344381	2001 XQ_{216}	—	December 14, 2001	Socorro	LINEAR	·	4.2 km	MPC · JPL
344382	2001 XX_{217}	—	December 15, 2001	Socorro	LINEAR	·	3.3 km	MPC · JPL
344383	2001 XH_{224}	—	December 15, 2001	Socorro	LINEAR	·	3.8 km	MPC · JPL
344384	2001 XT_{231}	—	December 15, 2001	Socorro	LINEAR	·	3.6 km	MPC · JPL
344385	2001 XW_{232}	—	December 15, 2001	Socorro	LINEAR	·	4.4 km	MPC · JPL
344386	2001 XM_{233}	—	December 15, 2001	Socorro	LINEAR	·	5.8 km	MPC · JPL
344387	2001 XN_{248}	—	December 14, 2001	Kitt Peak	Spacewatch	MAS	660 m	MPC · JPL
344388	2001 XF_{258}	—	December 8, 2001	Anderson Mesa	LONEOS	TIR	3.2 km	MPC · JPL
344389	2001 XQ_{260}	—	December 10, 2001	Kitt Peak	Spacewatch	·	2.4 km	MPC · JPL
344390	2001 XG_{267}	—	December 9, 2001	Socorro	LINEAR	·	3.9 km	MPC · JPL
344391	2001 YQ_{37}	—	December 18, 2001	Socorro	LINEAR	·	4.1 km	MPC · JPL
344392	2001 YG_{44}	—	December 18, 2001	Socorro	LINEAR	·	6.0 km	MPC · JPL
344393	2001 YV_{77}	—	December 18, 2001	Socorro	LINEAR	·	1.7 km	MPC · JPL
344394	2001 YM_{80}	—	December 18, 2001	Socorro	LINEAR	·	4.3 km	MPC · JPL
344395	2001 YT_{87}	—	December 18, 2001	Socorro	LINEAR	·	1.5 km	MPC · JPL
344396	2001 YS_{124}	—	December 17, 2001	Socorro	LINEAR	·	4.3 km	MPC · JPL
344397	2001 YM_{129}	—	December 17, 2001	Socorro	LINEAR	·	1.6 km	MPC · JPL
344398	2001 YU_{144}	—	December 17, 2001	Socorro	LINEAR	·	4.9 km	MPC · JPL
344399	2002 AH_{4}	—	January 8, 2002	Socorro	LINEAR	T_{j} (2.95)	3.3 km	MPC · JPL
344400	2002 AA_{7}	—	January 9, 2002	Cima Ekar	ADAS	EUN	1.8 km	MPC · JPL

== 344401–344500 ==
back to top

Designation			Discovery			Properties		Ref
Permanent	Provisional	Named after	Date	Site	Discoverer(s)	Category	Diam.	Ref
344401	2002 AJ_{22}	—	January 9, 2002	Kitt Peak	Spacewatch	EUN	1.6 km	MPC · JPL
344402	2002 AS_{25}	—	January 8, 2002	Palomar	NEAT	·	2.0 km	MPC · JPL
344403	2002 AN_{33}	—	January 7, 2002	Kitt Peak	Spacewatch	·	1.4 km	MPC · JPL
344404	2002 AG_{44}	—	January 9, 2002	Socorro	LINEAR	·	3.3 km	MPC · JPL
344405	2002 AQ_{88}	—	January 9, 2002	Socorro	LINEAR	·	5.2 km	MPC · JPL
344406	2002 AS_{107}	—	January 9, 2002	Socorro	LINEAR	MAS	970 m	MPC · JPL
344407	2002 AN_{127}	—	January 13, 2002	Socorro	LINEAR	NYS	1.4 km	MPC · JPL
344408	2002 AU_{137}	—	January 9, 2002	Socorro	LINEAR	·	3.2 km	MPC · JPL
344409	2002 AB_{148}	—	January 13, 2002	Palomar	NEAT	·	4.1 km	MPC · JPL
344410	2002 AD_{148}	—	January 13, 2002	Palomar	NEAT	·	1.8 km	MPC · JPL
344411	2002 AP_{163}	—	January 13, 2002	Socorro	LINEAR	·	1.5 km	MPC · JPL
344412	2002 AP_{171}	—	January 14, 2002	Socorro	LINEAR	·	1.4 km	MPC · JPL
344413 Campodeifiori	2002 BC	Campodeifiori	January 18, 2002	Schiaparelli	Bellini, F.	·	4.2 km	MPC · JPL
344414	2002 BF_{14}	—	January 19, 2002	Socorro	LINEAR	·	1.2 km	MPC · JPL
344415	2002 BO_{28}	—	January 19, 2002	Anderson Mesa	LONEOS	·	4.9 km	MPC · JPL
344416	2002 BV_{30}	—	January 26, 2002	Socorro	LINEAR	PHO	1.2 km	MPC · JPL
344417	2002 CK_{17}	—	February 6, 2002	Socorro	LINEAR	NYS	1.4 km	MPC · JPL
344418	2002 CY_{35}	—	February 7, 2002	Socorro	LINEAR	·	2.6 km	MPC · JPL
344419	2002 CU_{37}	—	February 7, 2002	Socorro	LINEAR	·	4.4 km	MPC · JPL
344420	2002 CG_{68}	—	February 7, 2002	Socorro	LINEAR	·	2.9 km	MPC · JPL
344421	2002 CL_{182}	—	February 10, 2002	Socorro	LINEAR	·	1.4 km	MPC · JPL
344422	2002 CK_{201}	—	February 10, 2002	Socorro	LINEAR	·	1.6 km	MPC · JPL
344423	2002 CK_{207}	—	February 10, 2002	Socorro	LINEAR	·	1.6 km	MPC · JPL
344424	2002 CO_{233}	—	February 11, 2002	Socorro	LINEAR	·	1.8 km	MPC · JPL
344425	2002 CC_{234}	—	February 12, 2002	Palomar	NEAT	T_{j} (2.95)	3.1 km	MPC · JPL
344426	2002 CF_{258}	—	February 6, 2002	Palomar	NEAT	·	5.0 km	MPC · JPL
344427	2002 CS_{275}	—	February 9, 2002	Kitt Peak	Spacewatch	MAS	640 m	MPC · JPL
344428	2002 DD	—	February 16, 2002	Ondřejov	P. Pravec, P. Kušnirák	MAS	810 m	MPC · JPL
344429	2002 EP_{43}	—	March 12, 2002	Socorro	LINEAR	·	1.4 km	MPC · JPL
344430	2002 ES_{100}	—	March 5, 2002	Haleakala	NEAT	·	2.0 km	MPC · JPL
344431	2002 EA_{114}	—	March 10, 2002	Kitt Peak	Spacewatch	·	1.6 km	MPC · JPL
344432	2002 EZ_{115}	—	March 10, 2002	Haleakala	NEAT	·	1.6 km	MPC · JPL
344433	2002 EL_{157}	—	March 13, 2002	Palomar	NEAT	·	1.2 km	MPC · JPL
344434	2002 FJ_{37}	—	March 31, 2002	Palomar	NEAT	MAR	1.5 km	MPC · JPL
344435	2002 FD_{38}	—	March 30, 2002	Palomar	NEAT	L4	16 km	MPC · JPL
344436	2002 GE_{12}	—	April 15, 2002	Desert Eagle	W. K. Y. Yeung	·	2.8 km	MPC · JPL
344437	2002 GF_{87}	—	April 10, 2002	Socorro	LINEAR	·	2.0 km	MPC · JPL
344438	2002 GR_{114}	—	April 11, 2002	Socorro	LINEAR	·	1.2 km	MPC · JPL
344439	2002 GY_{116}	—	April 11, 2002	Socorro	LINEAR	·	1.4 km	MPC · JPL
344440	2002 GU_{126}	—	April 12, 2002	Palomar	NEAT	·	1.4 km	MPC · JPL
344441	2002 GN_{170}	—	April 9, 2002	Socorro	LINEAR	·	2.5 km	MPC · JPL
344442	2002 GX_{181}	—	April 2, 2002	Kitt Peak	Spacewatch	·	2.1 km	MPC · JPL
344443	2002 GL_{189}	—	April 8, 2002	Palomar	NEAT	·	1.7 km	MPC · JPL
344444	2002 HM_{3}	—	April 16, 2002	Socorro	LINEAR	·	2.7 km	MPC · JPL
344445	2002 HQ_{7}	—	April 19, 2002	Kitt Peak	Spacewatch	·	1.9 km	MPC · JPL
344446	2002 JO_{54}	—	May 9, 2002	Socorro	LINEAR	·	2.9 km	MPC · JPL
344447	2002 JU_{78}	—	May 11, 2002	Socorro	LINEAR	·	1.3 km	MPC · JPL
344448	2002 JO_{95}	—	May 11, 2002	Socorro	LINEAR	·	2.1 km	MPC · JPL
344449	2002 JB_{106}	—	May 13, 2002	Socorro	LINEAR	·	1.8 km	MPC · JPL
344450	2002 JJ_{120}	—	May 5, 2002	Palomar	NEAT	·	2.2 km	MPC · JPL
344451	2002 JM_{123}	—	May 6, 2002	Palomar	NEAT	·	2.0 km	MPC · JPL
344452	2002 KF_{13}	—	May 18, 2002	Palomar	NEAT	·	1.7 km	MPC · JPL
344453	2002 LE_{29}	—	June 9, 2002	Socorro	LINEAR	TIN	3.1 km	MPC · JPL
344454	2002 LL_{42}	—	June 10, 2002	Socorro	LINEAR	·	2.1 km	MPC · JPL
344455	2002 LE_{47}	—	June 15, 2002	Emerald Lane	L. Ball	ADE	3.4 km	MPC · JPL
344456	2002 LZ_{51}	—	June 9, 2002	Socorro	LINEAR	·	1.8 km	MPC · JPL
344457	2002 MX_{3}	—	June 24, 2002	Palomar	NEAT	·	4.4 km	MPC · JPL
344458	2002 MT_{6}	—	April 25, 2006	Mount Lemmon	Mount Lemmon Survey	·	1.9 km	MPC · JPL
344459	2002 MW_{6}	—	January 14, 2008	Kitt Peak	Spacewatch	·	780 m	MPC · JPL
344460	2002 NH_{20}	—	July 9, 2002	Socorro	LINEAR	·	860 m	MPC · JPL
344461	2002 NK_{56}	—	July 11, 2002	Campo Imperatore	CINEOS	GEF	1.6 km	MPC · JPL
344462	2002 ND_{63}	—	July 9, 2002	Palomar	NEAT	·	1.9 km	MPC · JPL
344463	2002 NX_{65}	—	July 9, 2002	Palomar	NEAT	·	1.9 km	MPC · JPL
344464	2002 NK_{76}	—	November 30, 2003	Kitt Peak	Spacewatch	·	2.0 km	MPC · JPL
344465	2002 NB_{79}	—	May 8, 2006	Mount Lemmon	Mount Lemmon Survey	·	2.1 km	MPC · JPL
344466	2002 OF_{7}	—	July 20, 2002	Palomar	NEAT	·	2.0 km	MPC · JPL
344467	2002 OK_{7}	—	July 20, 2002	Palomar	NEAT	·	2.7 km	MPC · JPL
344468	2002 OT_{36}	—	April 26, 2006	Mount Lemmon	Mount Lemmon Survey	·	2.6 km	MPC · JPL
344469	2002 OA_{37}	—	October 27, 2008	Kitt Peak	Spacewatch	·	1.9 km	MPC · JPL
344470	2002 PQ_{4}	—	August 4, 2002	Palomar	NEAT	·	2.5 km	MPC · JPL
344471	2002 PN_{59}	—	August 10, 2002	Socorro	LINEAR	PHO	3.7 km	MPC · JPL
344472	2002 PR_{93}	—	August 11, 2002	Haleakala	NEAT	·	2.4 km	MPC · JPL
344473	2002 PM_{109}	—	August 13, 2002	Socorro	LINEAR	BRA	1.7 km	MPC · JPL
344474	2002 PN_{113}	—	August 15, 2002	Socorro	LINEAR	·	4.0 km	MPC · JPL
344475	2002 PG_{118}	—	July 21, 2002	Palomar	NEAT	·	720 m	MPC · JPL
344476	2002 PX_{143}	—	August 9, 2002	Cerro Tololo	M. W. Buie	AGN	1.1 km	MPC · JPL
344477	2002 PB_{160}	—	August 8, 2002	Palomar	S. F. Hönig	·	2.8 km	MPC · JPL
344478	2002 PY_{165}	—	August 8, 2002	Palomar	Lowe, A.	AGN	1.4 km	MPC · JPL
344479	2002 PR_{168}	—	August 8, 2002	Palomar	NEAT	AGN	1.4 km	MPC · JPL
344480	2002 PE_{170}	—	August 8, 2002	Palomar	NEAT	KOR	1.4 km	MPC · JPL
344481	2002 PH_{177}	—	August 11, 2002	Palomar	NEAT	HOF	3.2 km	MPC · JPL
344482	2002 PN_{184}	—	August 15, 2002	Palomar	NEAT	·	2.1 km	MPC · JPL
344483	2002 PM_{197}	—	March 30, 2011	Mount Lemmon	Mount Lemmon Survey	·	540 m	MPC · JPL
344484	2002 PP_{197}	—	March 11, 2005	Mount Lemmon	Mount Lemmon Survey	·	2.1 km	MPC · JPL
344485	2002 PW_{197}	—	December 21, 2008	Kitt Peak	Spacewatch	·	2.2 km	MPC · JPL
344486	2002 QU_{16}	—	August 27, 2002	Palomar	NEAT	·	2.4 km	MPC · JPL
344487	2002 QR_{48}	—	July 22, 2002	Palomar	NEAT	·	580 m	MPC · JPL
344488	2002 QO_{68}	—	August 18, 2002	Palomar	NEAT	·	1.9 km	MPC · JPL
344489	2002 QP_{71}	—	August 18, 2002	Palomar	NEAT	·	670 m	MPC · JPL
344490	2002 QZ_{76}	—	August 17, 2002	Palomar	NEAT	·	700 m	MPC · JPL
344491	2002 QU_{79}	—	August 20, 2002	Xinglong	SCAP	MRX	1.2 km	MPC · JPL
344492	2002 QU_{84}	—	August 30, 2002	Palomar	NEAT	·	2.1 km	MPC · JPL
344493	2002 QJ_{85}	—	August 17, 2002	Palomar	NEAT	·	1.9 km	MPC · JPL
344494	2002 QQ_{94}	—	August 17, 2002	Haleakala	NEAT	·	570 m	MPC · JPL
344495	2002 QF_{102}	—	August 18, 2002	Palomar	NEAT	·	2.9 km	MPC · JPL
344496	2002 QW_{105}	—	August 29, 2002	Palomar	NEAT	·	2.5 km	MPC · JPL
344497	2002 QL_{113}	—	August 27, 2002	Palomar	NEAT	·	2.2 km	MPC · JPL
344498	2002 QX_{114}	—	August 28, 2002	Palomar	NEAT	HOF	2.3 km	MPC · JPL
344499	2002 QF_{115}	—	August 18, 2002	Palomar	NEAT	·	2.2 km	MPC · JPL
344500	2002 QH_{121}	—	August 16, 2002	Palomar	NEAT	·	510 m	MPC · JPL

== 344501–344600 ==
back to top

Designation			Discovery			Properties		Ref
Permanent	Provisional	Named after	Date	Site	Discoverer(s)	Category	Diam.	Ref
344501	2002 QN_{132}	—	August 16, 2002	Palomar	NEAT	AGN	1.1 km	MPC · JPL
344502	2002 QW_{139}	—	March 4, 2005	Mount Lemmon	Mount Lemmon Survey	·	2.9 km	MPC · JPL
344503	2002 QS_{141}	—	July 21, 2007	Charleston	R. Holmes	·	2.0 km	MPC · JPL
344504	2002 QG_{144}	—	September 10, 2007	Kitt Peak	Spacewatch	·	1.7 km	MPC · JPL
344505	2002 QJ_{149}	—	December 1, 2003	Kitt Peak	Spacewatch	·	2.0 km	MPC · JPL
344506	2002 QN_{152}	—	October 9, 1999	Socorro	LINEAR	·	720 m	MPC · JPL
344507	2002 RZ_{10}	—	September 4, 2002	Palomar	NEAT	·	820 m	MPC · JPL
344508	2002 RQ_{78}	—	September 5, 2002	Socorro	LINEAR	·	610 m	MPC · JPL
344509	2002 RL_{80}	—	September 5, 2002	Socorro	LINEAR	PHO	1.2 km	MPC · JPL
344510	2002 RT_{82}	—	September 5, 2002	Socorro	LINEAR	·	730 m	MPC · JPL
344511	2002 RG_{85}	—	September 5, 2002	Socorro	LINEAR	·	810 m	MPC · JPL
344512	2002 RM_{128}	—	September 10, 2002	Palomar	NEAT	(18466)	2.4 km	MPC · JPL
344513	2002 RE_{140}	—	September 10, 2002	Palomar	NEAT	·	2.6 km	MPC · JPL
344514	2002 RQ_{224}	—	September 13, 2002	Anderson Mesa	LONEOS	·	2.3 km	MPC · JPL
344515	2002 RA_{242}	—	September 14, 2002	Palomar	R. Matson	·	2.7 km	MPC · JPL
344516	2002 RW_{248}	—	September 14, 2002	Palomar	NEAT	AGN	1.2 km	MPC · JPL
344517	2002 RX_{269}	—	September 1, 2002	Palomar	NEAT	·	2.2 km	MPC · JPL
344518	2002 RU_{277}	—	September 4, 2002	Palomar	NEAT	·	610 m	MPC · JPL
344519	2002 RH_{293}	—	September 9, 2007	Mount Lemmon	Mount Lemmon Survey	·	2.3 km	MPC · JPL
344520	2002 SF_{2}	—	September 26, 2002	Palomar	NEAT	·	540 m	MPC · JPL
344521	2002 SY_{10}	—	September 27, 2002	Palomar	NEAT	·	2.1 km	MPC · JPL
344522	2002 SB_{20}	—	September 26, 2002	Palomar	NEAT	·	2.3 km	MPC · JPL
344523	2002 SB_{41}	—	September 30, 2002	Haleakala	NEAT	V	980 m	MPC · JPL
344524	2002 TK_{6}	—	October 1, 2002	Anderson Mesa	LONEOS	·	2.0 km	MPC · JPL
344525	2002 TJ_{92}	—	September 28, 2002	Palomar	NEAT	·	670 m	MPC · JPL
344526	2002 TD_{110}	—	October 2, 2002	Haleakala	NEAT	·	2.7 km	MPC · JPL
344527	2002 TZ_{135}	—	October 4, 2002	Anderson Mesa	LONEOS	·	3.7 km	MPC · JPL
344528	2002 TK_{149}	—	October 5, 2002	Palomar	NEAT	KOR	1.4 km	MPC · JPL
344529	2002 TG_{159}	—	October 5, 2002	Palomar	NEAT	·	3.5 km	MPC · JPL
344530	2002 TZ_{163}	—	October 5, 2002	Palomar	NEAT	BRA	2.4 km	MPC · JPL
344531	2002 TE_{231}	—	October 8, 2002	Palomar	NEAT	·	3.6 km	MPC · JPL
344532	2002 TH_{237}	—	October 6, 2002	Socorro	LINEAR	·	720 m	MPC · JPL
344533	2002 TJ_{245}	—	October 7, 2002	Haleakala	NEAT	·	2.2 km	MPC · JPL
344534	2002 TJ_{313}	—	October 4, 2002	Apache Point	SDSS	·	2.8 km	MPC · JPL
344535	2002 TD_{329}	—	October 5, 2002	Apache Point	SDSS	KOR	1.3 km	MPC · JPL
344536	2002 TV_{332}	—	October 5, 2002	Apache Point	SDSS	KOR	1.2 km	MPC · JPL
344537	2002 TZ_{374}	—	October 5, 2002	Palomar	NEAT	·	2.7 km	MPC · JPL
344538	2002 TV_{377}	—	October 4, 2002	Palomar	NEAT	·	760 m	MPC · JPL
344539	2002 TN_{385}	—	October 15, 2002	Palomar	NEAT	·	660 m	MPC · JPL
344540	2002 TS_{385}	—	October 15, 2002	Palomar	NEAT	·	1.1 km	MPC · JPL
344541	2002 UW_{51}	—	October 29, 2002	Apache Point	SDSS	·	2.2 km	MPC · JPL
344542	2002 VU_{10}	—	November 1, 2002	Palomar	NEAT	·	840 m	MPC · JPL
344543	2002 VA_{18}	—	November 2, 2002	Haleakala	NEAT	·	2.4 km	MPC · JPL
344544	2002 VP_{54}	—	November 6, 2002	Anderson Mesa	LONEOS	·	1.0 km	MPC · JPL
344545	2002 VJ_{74}	—	November 7, 2002	Socorro	LINEAR	·	2.5 km	MPC · JPL
344546	2002 VK_{78}	—	November 7, 2002	Socorro	LINEAR	·	3.8 km	MPC · JPL
344547	2002 VM_{86}	—	November 8, 2002	Socorro	LINEAR	·	730 m	MPC · JPL
344548	2002 VK_{95}	—	November 11, 2002	Socorro	LINEAR	·	830 m	MPC · JPL
344549	2002 VJ_{98}	—	November 12, 2002	Socorro	LINEAR	·	890 m	MPC · JPL
344550	2002 VP_{104}	—	November 12, 2002	Socorro	LINEAR	·	840 m	MPC · JPL
344551	2002 VJ_{122}	—	November 13, 2002	Palomar	NEAT	·	910 m	MPC · JPL
344552	2002 VM_{139}	—	November 1, 2002	Palomar	NEAT	·	2.3 km	MPC · JPL
344553	2002 VS_{147}	—	December 15, 2009	Mount Lemmon	Mount Lemmon Survey	·	900 m	MPC · JPL
344554	2002 WG_{19}	—	November 25, 2002	Palomar	S. F. Hönig	·	870 m	MPC · JPL
344555	2002 WN_{22}	—	December 27, 2006	Mount Lemmon	Mount Lemmon Survey	·	1.9 km	MPC · JPL
344556	2002 WF_{25}	—	November 25, 2002	Palomar	NEAT	L5	8.1 km	MPC · JPL
344557	2002 WU_{31}	—	July 31, 2005	Palomar	NEAT	·	910 m	MPC · JPL
344558	2002 XQ_{13}	—	December 3, 2002	Palomar	NEAT	·	2.8 km	MPC · JPL
344559	2002 XF_{16}	—	December 3, 2002	Palomar	NEAT	·	930 m	MPC · JPL
344560	2002 XK_{31}	—	December 6, 2002	Socorro	LINEAR	·	990 m	MPC · JPL
344561	2002 XA_{32}	—	December 6, 2002	Socorro	LINEAR	·	770 m	MPC · JPL
344562	2002 XZ_{33}	—	December 5, 2002	Socorro	LINEAR	·	970 m	MPC · JPL
344563	2002 XS_{35}	—	December 7, 2002	Desert Eagle	W. K. Y. Yeung	·	1.1 km	MPC · JPL
344564	2002 XX_{40}	—	December 6, 2002	Socorro	LINEAR	·	4.7 km	MPC · JPL
344565	2002 XT_{41}	—	December 6, 2002	Socorro	LINEAR	·	860 m	MPC · JPL
344566	2002 XY_{42}	—	December 9, 2002	Kitt Peak	Spacewatch	·	850 m	MPC · JPL
344567	2002 XB_{46}	—	December 10, 2002	Socorro	LINEAR	·	4.0 km	MPC · JPL
344568	2002 XX_{50}	—	December 5, 2002	Socorro	LINEAR	·	900 m	MPC · JPL
344569	2002 XL_{116}	—	December 11, 2002	Apache Point	SDSS	HYG	3.4 km	MPC · JPL
344570	2002 XD_{119}	—	December 11, 2002	Palomar	NEAT	·	810 m	MPC · JPL
344571	2002 XP_{119}	—	December 10, 2002	Palomar	NEAT	·	3.8 km	MPC · JPL
344572	2003 AM_{15}	—	January 4, 2003	Nashville	Clingan, R.	·	950 m	MPC · JPL
344573	2003 AV_{16}	—	January 5, 2003	Tebbutt	F. B. Zoltowski	EOS	2.6 km	MPC · JPL
344574	2003 AG_{42}	—	January 7, 2003	Socorro	LINEAR	·	990 m	MPC · JPL
344575	2003 AE_{51}	—	December 31, 2002	Socorro	LINEAR	·	3.6 km	MPC · JPL
344576	2003 AA_{66}	—	January 7, 2003	Socorro	LINEAR	PHO	1.1 km	MPC · JPL
344577	2003 AA_{71}	—	January 10, 2003	Kitt Peak	Spacewatch	·	680 m	MPC · JPL
344578	2003 AT_{72}	—	January 11, 2003	Socorro	LINEAR	·	5.8 km	MPC · JPL
344579	2003 AE_{78}	—	January 10, 2003	Socorro	LINEAR	·	3.4 km	MPC · JPL
344580	2003 AR_{84}	—	January 10, 2003	Socorro	LINEAR	·	2.4 km	MPC · JPL
344581 Albisetti	2003 BG_{1}	Albisetti	January 24, 2003	Sormano	Sormano	·	2.9 km	MPC · JPL
344582	2003 BE_{7}	—	January 25, 2003	Anderson Mesa	LONEOS	·	1.5 km	MPC · JPL
344583	2003 BS_{66}	—	January 31, 2003	Socorro	LINEAR	·	1.3 km	MPC · JPL
344584	2003 BZ_{68}	—	January 29, 2003	Palomar	NEAT	·	3.7 km	MPC · JPL
344585	2003 BG_{70}	—	January 30, 2003	Socorro	LINEAR	·	3.2 km	MPC · JPL
344586	2003 BB_{71}	—	January 31, 2003	Kitt Peak	Spacewatch	·	2.5 km	MPC · JPL
344587	2003 BF_{76}	—	January 29, 2003	Palomar	NEAT	·	2.5 km	MPC · JPL
344588	2003 BN_{81}	—	January 31, 2003	Socorro	LINEAR	·	3.0 km	MPC · JPL
344589	2003 BR_{81}	—	January 31, 2003	Socorro	LINEAR	EUP	4.9 km	MPC · JPL
344590	2003 BR_{87}	—	January 27, 2003	Anderson Mesa	LONEOS	·	4.4 km	MPC · JPL
344591	2003 BC_{93}	—	January 26, 2003	Palomar	NEAT	·	2.7 km	MPC · JPL
344592	2003 BU_{93}	—	January 17, 2003	Palomar	NEAT	·	3.7 km	MPC · JPL
344593	2003 CF_{5}	—	September 28, 2001	Palomar	NEAT	·	3.4 km	MPC · JPL
344594	2003 CJ_{7}	—	February 1, 2003	Socorro	LINEAR	·	1.6 km	MPC · JPL
344595	2003 CN_{11}	—	February 5, 2003	Wrightwood	J. W. Young	·	1.1 km	MPC · JPL
344596	2003 CP_{24}	—	February 3, 2003	Palomar	NEAT	ERI	2.0 km	MPC · JPL
344597	2003 DW_{3}	—	February 22, 2003	Palomar	NEAT	·	1.7 km	MPC · JPL
344598	2003 DB_{10}	—	February 23, 2003	Socorro	LINEAR	·	6.9 km	MPC · JPL
344599	2003 DM_{23}	—	February 25, 2003	Haleakala	NEAT	·	4.1 km	MPC · JPL
344600	2003 DW_{23}	—	February 21, 2003	Palomar	NEAT	·	3.5 km	MPC · JPL

== 344601–344700 ==
back to top

Designation			Discovery			Properties		Ref
Permanent	Provisional	Named after	Date	Site	Discoverer(s)	Category	Diam.	Ref
344601	2003 EJ_{14}	—	March 7, 2003	Palomar	NEAT	·	1.4 km	MPC · JPL
344602	2003 EK_{14}	—	March 7, 2003	Palomar	NEAT	·	850 m	MPC · JPL
344603	2003 ER_{16}	—	March 9, 2003	Palomar	NEAT	EUP	3.5 km	MPC · JPL
344604	2003 EA_{19}	—	March 6, 2003	Anderson Mesa	LONEOS	MAS	750 m	MPC · JPL
344605	2003 EU_{20}	—	March 6, 2003	Anderson Mesa	LONEOS	·	1.5 km	MPC · JPL
344606	2003 EM_{30}	—	March 6, 2003	Palomar	NEAT	·	3.1 km	MPC · JPL
344607	2003 EE_{32}	—	March 7, 2003	Socorro	LINEAR	T_{j} (2.94)	4.5 km	MPC · JPL
344608	2003 EB_{34}	—	March 7, 2003	Kitt Peak	Spacewatch	·	5.0 km	MPC · JPL
344609	2003 EM_{50}	—	March 9, 2003	Kitt Peak	Spacewatch	H	580 m	MPC · JPL
344610	2003 EH_{53}	—	March 8, 2003	Palomar	NEAT	·	4.4 km	MPC · JPL
344611	2003 EC_{57}	—	March 9, 2003	Anderson Mesa	LONEOS	·	3.5 km	MPC · JPL
344612	2003 EK_{60}	—	March 11, 2003	Palomar	NEAT	·	1.1 km	MPC · JPL
344613	2003 FB_{1}	—	March 23, 2003	Palomar	NEAT	T_{j} (2.98) · EUP	6.1 km	MPC · JPL
344614	2003 FK_{4}	—	March 24, 2003	Socorro	LINEAR	EUP	5.5 km	MPC · JPL
344615	2003 FY_{7}	—	March 30, 2003	Socorro	LINEAR	H	700 m	MPC · JPL
344616	2003 FA_{8}	—	March 30, 2003	Socorro	LINEAR	H	680 m	MPC · JPL
344617	2003 FE_{10}	—	March 23, 2003	Kitt Peak	Spacewatch	NYS	920 m	MPC · JPL
344618	2003 FA_{27}	—	March 24, 2003	Kitt Peak	Spacewatch	·	1.2 km	MPC · JPL
344619	2003 FP_{30}	—	March 25, 2003	Haleakala	NEAT	·	870 m	MPC · JPL
344620	2003 FS_{39}	—	March 24, 2003	Kitt Peak	Spacewatch	·	1.4 km	MPC · JPL
344621	2003 FA_{45}	—	March 24, 2003	Kitt Peak	Spacewatch	MAS	770 m	MPC · JPL
344622	2003 FG_{58}	—	March 26, 2003	Palomar	NEAT	·	1.6 km	MPC · JPL
344623	2003 GW_{19}	—	April 5, 2003	Kitt Peak	Spacewatch	·	1.2 km	MPC · JPL
344624	2003 HC_{6}	—	April 24, 2003	Kitt Peak	Spacewatch	MAS	730 m	MPC · JPL
344625	2003 HV_{34}	—	April 26, 2003	Kitt Peak	Spacewatch	·	1 km	MPC · JPL
344626	2003 HX_{35}	—	April 27, 2003	Socorro	LINEAR	T_{j} (2.98)	3.2 km	MPC · JPL
344627	2003 JL_{2}	—	May 1, 2003	Kitt Peak	Spacewatch	·	1.3 km	MPC · JPL
344628	2003 JM_{5}	—	May 1, 2003	Socorro	LINEAR	·	1.6 km	MPC · JPL
344629	2003 JL_{18}	—	May 1, 2003	Kitt Peak	Spacewatch	L4 · ERY	9.1 km	MPC · JPL
344630	2003 KD_{10}	—	May 27, 2003	Haleakala	NEAT	·	1.1 km	MPC · JPL
344631	2003 LY_{2}	—	June 4, 2003	Socorro	LINEAR	·	2.2 km	MPC · JPL
344632	2003 OW_{6}	—	July 23, 2003	Palomar	NEAT	KON	4.1 km	MPC · JPL
344633	2003 OL_{14}	—	July 22, 2003	Palomar	NEAT	(194)	2.1 km	MPC · JPL
344634	2003 OW_{31}	—	July 25, 2003	Socorro	LINEAR	·	1.8 km	MPC · JPL
344635	2003 OU_{32}	—	July 22, 2003	Palomar	NEAT	·	2.2 km	MPC · JPL
344636	2003 PG_{7}	—	August 1, 2003	Haleakala	NEAT	(5)	1.5 km	MPC · JPL
344637	2003 QE_{4}	—	August 18, 2003	Campo Imperatore	CINEOS	·	1.7 km	MPC · JPL
344638	2003 QK_{9}	—	August 20, 2003	Campo Imperatore	CINEOS	·	1.6 km	MPC · JPL
344639	2003 QK_{11}	—	August 21, 2003	Haleakala	NEAT	·	2.2 km	MPC · JPL
344640	2003 QO_{25}	—	August 22, 2003	Palomar	NEAT	·	1.6 km	MPC · JPL
344641 Szeleczky	2003 QV_{29}	Szeleczky	August 23, 2003	Piszkéstető	K. Sárneczky, B. Sipőcz	·	1.4 km	MPC · JPL
344642	2003 QP_{31}	—	August 21, 2003	Haleakala	NEAT	·	1.7 km	MPC · JPL
344643	2003 QP_{34}	—	July 24, 2003	Palomar	NEAT	·	1.6 km	MPC · JPL
344644	2003 QC_{54}	—	August 23, 2003	Socorro	LINEAR	(1547)	2.3 km	MPC · JPL
344645	2003 QA_{65}	—	August 23, 2003	Palomar	NEAT	·	1.8 km	MPC · JPL
344646	2003 QN_{67}	—	August 23, 2003	Palomar	NEAT	·	2.2 km	MPC · JPL
344647	2003 QT_{69}	—	August 26, 2003	Kleť	Kleť	fast	1.7 km	MPC · JPL
344648	2003 QJ_{76}	—	August 24, 2003	Socorro	LINEAR	·	1.5 km	MPC · JPL
344649	2003 QW_{101}	—	August 29, 2003	Haleakala	NEAT	ADE	2.3 km	MPC · JPL
344650	2003 RM_{6}	—	August 31, 2003	Haleakala	NEAT	MAR	1.6 km	MPC · JPL
344651	2003 RB_{18}	—	September 4, 2003	Socorro	LINEAR	·	2.0 km	MPC · JPL
344652	2003 RA_{22}	—	September 14, 2003	Haleakala	NEAT	·	2.0 km	MPC · JPL
344653	2003 RN_{26}	—	September 3, 2003	Haleakala	NEAT	·	3.0 km	MPC · JPL
344654	2003 SK_{7}	—	September 16, 2003	Kitt Peak	Spacewatch	·	1.8 km	MPC · JPL
344655	2003 SE_{25}	—	September 17, 2003	Haleakala	NEAT	DOR	2.8 km	MPC · JPL
344656	2003 SP_{37}	—	September 16, 2003	Palomar	NEAT	EUN	1.4 km	MPC · JPL
344657	2003 SE_{47}	—	September 16, 2003	Anderson Mesa	LONEOS	·	1.9 km	MPC · JPL
344658	2003 SH_{54}	—	September 16, 2003	Anderson Mesa	LONEOS	·	2.0 km	MPC · JPL
344659	2003 SP_{65}	—	September 18, 2003	Anderson Mesa	LONEOS	·	1.9 km	MPC · JPL
344660	2003 SV_{66}	—	September 19, 2003	Campo Imperatore	CINEOS	EUN	1.9 km	MPC · JPL
344661	2003 SB_{72}	—	September 18, 2003	Kitt Peak	Spacewatch	·	1.5 km	MPC · JPL
344662	2003 SF_{73}	—	September 18, 2003	Kitt Peak	Spacewatch	·	1.5 km	MPC · JPL
344663	2003 SY_{87}	—	September 17, 2003	Campo Imperatore	CINEOS	·	1.6 km	MPC · JPL
344664	2003 SJ_{104}	—	September 20, 2003	Haleakala	NEAT	·	1.8 km	MPC · JPL
344665	2003 SH_{106}	—	September 15, 2003	Palomar	NEAT	·	2.0 km	MPC · JPL
344666	2003 SK_{113}	—	September 16, 2003	Kitt Peak	Spacewatch	·	1.6 km	MPC · JPL
344667	2003 SA_{142}	—	September 20, 2003	Palomar	NEAT	·	1.5 km	MPC · JPL
344668	2003 SX_{148}	—	September 16, 2003	Kitt Peak	Spacewatch	·	2.5 km	MPC · JPL
344669	2003 SN_{149}	—	September 16, 2003	Kitt Peak	Spacewatch	·	2.1 km	MPC · JPL
344670	2003 SA_{152}	—	September 19, 2003	Anderson Mesa	LONEOS	·	3.1 km	MPC · JPL
344671	2003 SQ_{152}	—	September 19, 2003	Anderson Mesa	LONEOS	·	2.8 km	MPC · JPL
344672	2003 ST_{160}	—	September 16, 2003	Anderson Mesa	LONEOS	GEF	1.5 km	MPC · JPL
344673	2003 SG_{168}	—	September 23, 2003	Palomar	NEAT	·	2.4 km	MPC · JPL
344674	2003 SB_{176}	—	September 18, 2003	Palomar	NEAT	·	2.0 km	MPC · JPL
344675	2003 SH_{186}	—	September 22, 2003	Anderson Mesa	LONEOS	·	1.5 km	MPC · JPL
344676	2003 SF_{189}	—	September 22, 2003	Socorro	LINEAR	·	2.3 km	MPC · JPL
344677	2003 SY_{196}	—	August 25, 2003	Palomar	NEAT	·	1.8 km	MPC · JPL
344678	2003 SC_{205}	—	September 22, 2003	Kitt Peak	Spacewatch	·	2.2 km	MPC · JPL
344679	2003 SV_{205}	—	September 17, 2003	Kitt Peak	Spacewatch	·	1.7 km	MPC · JPL
344680	2003 SO_{235}	—	September 24, 2003	Haleakala	NEAT	ADE	2.7 km	MPC · JPL
344681	2003 SM_{236}	—	September 26, 2003	Socorro	LINEAR	ADE	2.2 km	MPC · JPL
344682	2003 SX_{241}	—	September 18, 2003	Palomar	NEAT	·	2.2 km	MPC · JPL
344683	2003 SP_{263}	—	September 28, 2003	Socorro	LINEAR	·	2.1 km	MPC · JPL
344684	2003 SY_{270}	—	September 25, 2003	Palomar	NEAT	·	1.4 km	MPC · JPL
344685	2003 SH_{272}	—	September 27, 2003	Socorro	LINEAR	·	1.7 km	MPC · JPL
344686	2003 SW_{278}	—	September 30, 2003	Socorro	LINEAR	·	2.2 km	MPC · JPL
344687	2003 SS_{289}	—	September 28, 2003	Anderson Mesa	LONEOS	·	1.9 km	MPC · JPL
344688	2003 SA_{298}	—	September 18, 2003	Haleakala	NEAT	·	2.4 km	MPC · JPL
344689	2003 SU_{311}	—	September 29, 2003	Kitt Peak	Spacewatch	·	1.6 km	MPC · JPL
344690	2003 SK_{312}	—	September 27, 2003	Goodricke-Pigott	R. A. Tucker	·	1.9 km	MPC · JPL
344691	2003 SL_{312}	—	September 19, 2003	Socorro	LINEAR	JUN	1.2 km	MPC · JPL
344692	2003 SL_{335}	—	September 26, 2003	Apache Point	SDSS	·	1.8 km	MPC · JPL
344693	2003 SS_{337}	—	September 18, 2003	Kitt Peak	Spacewatch	·	1.8 km	MPC · JPL
344694	2003 SX_{337}	—	September 19, 2003	Kitt Peak	Spacewatch	·	1.4 km	MPC · JPL
344695	2003 SY_{382}	—	September 26, 2003	Apache Point	SDSS	·	1.6 km	MPC · JPL
344696	2003 SK_{392}	—	September 26, 2003	Apache Point	SDSS	NEM	2.4 km	MPC · JPL
344697	2003 SA_{395}	—	September 26, 2003	Apache Point	SDSS	·	2.0 km	MPC · JPL
344698	2003 SM_{402}	—	September 26, 2003	Apache Point	SDSS	·	1.9 km	MPC · JPL
344699	2003 SH_{406}	—	October 16, 2003	Palomar	NEAT	·	2.5 km	MPC · JPL
344700	2003 SV_{423}	—	September 25, 2003	Mauna Kea	P. A. Wiegert	·	1.2 km	MPC · JPL

== 344701–344800 ==
back to top

Designation			Discovery			Properties		Ref
Permanent	Provisional	Named after	Date	Site	Discoverer(s)	Category	Diam.	Ref
344701	2003 SW_{427}	—	September 29, 2003	Kitt Peak	Spacewatch	·	2.0 km	MPC · JPL
344702	2003 SG_{432}	—	September 18, 2003	Kitt Peak	Spacewatch	·	1.6 km	MPC · JPL
344703	2003 TP_{13}	—	October 3, 2003	Kitt Peak	Spacewatch	·	2.6 km	MPC · JPL
344704	2003 TU_{14}	—	September 20, 2003	Socorro	LINEAR	·	1.8 km	MPC · JPL
344705	2003 TU_{20}	—	October 15, 2003	Anderson Mesa	LONEOS	·	2.3 km	MPC · JPL
344706	2003 TS_{33}	—	October 1, 2003	Kitt Peak	Spacewatch	·	2.1 km	MPC · JPL
344707	2003 TJ_{44}	—	October 2, 2003	Haleakala	NEAT	·	2.1 km	MPC · JPL
344708	2003 TC_{48}	—	October 3, 2003	Kitt Peak	Spacewatch	·	1.7 km	MPC · JPL
344709	2003 TG_{54}	—	October 5, 2003	Kitt Peak	Spacewatch	·	1.6 km	MPC · JPL
344710	2003 TT_{54}	—	October 5, 2003	Kitt Peak	Spacewatch	·	1.5 km	MPC · JPL
344711	2003 TA_{57}	—	October 5, 2003	Kitt Peak	Spacewatch	WIT	1.2 km	MPC · JPL
344712	2003 UZ_{6}	—	October 16, 2003	Socorro	LINEAR	BAR	1.9 km	MPC · JPL
344713	2003 UW_{14}	—	September 27, 2003	Kitt Peak	Spacewatch	·	1.6 km	MPC · JPL
344714	2003 UZ_{18}	—	October 20, 2003	Kitt Peak	Spacewatch	WIT	1.3 km	MPC · JPL
344715	2003 UX_{21}	—	October 22, 2003	Kingsnake	J. V. McClusky	·	2.5 km	MPC · JPL
344716	2003 UE_{48}	—	October 16, 2003	Kitt Peak	Spacewatch	·	2.3 km	MPC · JPL
344717	2003 UT_{65}	—	October 16, 2003	Palomar	NEAT	·	2.3 km	MPC · JPL
344718	2003 UL_{69}	—	October 18, 2003	Kitt Peak	Spacewatch	·	1.6 km	MPC · JPL
344719	2003 UN_{73}	—	October 19, 2003	Kitt Peak	Spacewatch	·	1.6 km	MPC · JPL
344720	2003 UJ_{76}	—	October 17, 2003	Anderson Mesa	LONEOS	·	3.5 km	MPC · JPL
344721	2003 UO_{76}	—	October 17, 2003	Anderson Mesa	LONEOS	·	4.1 km	MPC · JPL
344722	2003 UY_{80}	—	October 16, 2003	Anderson Mesa	LONEOS	·	2.5 km	MPC · JPL
344723	2003 UD_{101}	—	October 20, 2003	Palomar	NEAT	·	1.7 km	MPC · JPL
344724	2003 UV_{104}	—	October 18, 2003	Kitt Peak	Spacewatch	·	2.2 km	MPC · JPL
344725	2003 UN_{105}	—	October 18, 2003	Kitt Peak	Spacewatch	·	2.1 km	MPC · JPL
344726	2003 UH_{117}	—	October 21, 2003	Socorro	LINEAR	MRX	1.3 km	MPC · JPL
344727	2003 UB_{119}	—	October 18, 2003	Kitt Peak	Spacewatch	HNS	1.5 km	MPC · JPL
344728	2003 UO_{124}	—	October 20, 2003	Kitt Peak	Spacewatch	·	1.8 km	MPC · JPL
344729	2003 UQ_{125}	—	October 20, 2003	Socorro	LINEAR	·	2.0 km	MPC · JPL
344730	2003 UU_{131}	—	October 19, 2003	Palomar	NEAT	·	2.3 km	MPC · JPL
344731	2003 UM_{137}	—	September 27, 2003	Kitt Peak	Spacewatch	·	1.3 km	MPC · JPL
344732	2003 UO_{138}	—	October 21, 2003	Socorro	LINEAR	·	2.7 km	MPC · JPL
344733	2003 UX_{139}	—	October 16, 2003	Anderson Mesa	LONEOS	·	2.1 km	MPC · JPL
344734	2003 UQ_{141}	—	October 18, 2003	Anderson Mesa	LONEOS	·	2.1 km	MPC · JPL
344735	2003 UF_{150}	—	October 20, 2003	Socorro	LINEAR	·	2.3 km	MPC · JPL
344736	2003 UQ_{153}	—	October 19, 2003	Anderson Mesa	LONEOS	EUN	1.6 km	MPC · JPL
344737	2003 UC_{160}	—	October 21, 2003	Kitt Peak	Spacewatch	·	1.8 km	MPC · JPL
344738	2003 UB_{164}	—	October 21, 2003	Socorro	LINEAR	·	2.3 km	MPC · JPL
344739	2003 UF_{198}	—	October 21, 2003	Kitt Peak	Spacewatch	·	1.7 km	MPC · JPL
344740	2003 UE_{205}	—	September 22, 2003	Kitt Peak	Spacewatch	·	2.5 km	MPC · JPL
344741	2003 UT_{215}	—	October 21, 2003	Kitt Peak	Spacewatch	EUN	1.4 km	MPC · JPL
344742	2003 UW_{225}	—	October 22, 2003	Kitt Peak	Spacewatch	ADE	2.2 km	MPC · JPL
344743	2003 UA_{233}	—	October 24, 2003	Socorro	LINEAR	·	1.8 km	MPC · JPL
344744	2003 UX_{241}	—	October 24, 2003	Socorro	LINEAR	·	2.0 km	MPC · JPL
344745	2003 UO_{244}	—	October 24, 2003	Kitt Peak	Spacewatch	AEO	1.3 km	MPC · JPL
344746	2003 UG_{245}	—	October 24, 2003	Kitt Peak	Spacewatch	·	2.3 km	MPC · JPL
344747	2003 UA_{277}	—	October 30, 2003	Socorro	LINEAR	·	2.6 km	MPC · JPL
344748	2003 UT_{284}	—	October 21, 2003	Palomar	NEAT	·	1.5 km	MPC · JPL
344749	2003 UX_{289}	—	September 26, 2003	Bergisch Gladbach	W. Bickel	·	1.8 km	MPC · JPL
344750	2003 UO_{317}	—	October 22, 2003	Apache Point	SDSS	EUN	1.2 km	MPC · JPL
344751	2003 UT_{319}	—	October 20, 2003	Kitt Peak	Spacewatch	·	2.2 km	MPC · JPL
344752	2003 US_{324}	—	October 17, 2003	Apache Point	SDSS	·	1.5 km	MPC · JPL
344753	2003 UT_{326}	—	October 17, 2003	Apache Point	SDSS	·	1.4 km	MPC · JPL
344754	2003 UQ_{371}	—	July 23, 2003	Palomar	NEAT	·	1.7 km	MPC · JPL
344755	2003 VL_{2}	—	November 4, 2003	Socorro	LINEAR	·	2.6 km	MPC · JPL
344756	2003 VO_{2}	—	November 14, 2003	Palomar	NEAT	AMO	250 m	MPC · JPL
344757	2003 WK_{20}	—	October 25, 2003	Socorro	LINEAR	·	2.6 km	MPC · JPL
344758	2003 WG_{29}	—	November 18, 2003	Kitt Peak	Spacewatch	·	1.9 km	MPC · JPL
344759	2003 WW_{29}	—	November 18, 2003	Kitt Peak	Spacewatch	·	2.1 km	MPC · JPL
344760	2003 WM_{43}	—	November 18, 2003	Palomar	NEAT	·	2.0 km	MPC · JPL
344761	2003 WO_{44}	—	November 19, 2003	Palomar	NEAT	·	2.8 km	MPC · JPL
344762	2003 WU_{61}	—	November 19, 2003	Kitt Peak	Spacewatch	WIT	1.4 km	MPC · JPL
344763	2003 WD_{62}	—	November 19, 2003	Kitt Peak	Spacewatch	JUN	1.2 km	MPC · JPL
344764	2003 WQ_{69}	—	November 19, 2003	Kitt Peak	Spacewatch	EOS	2.1 km	MPC · JPL
344765	2003 WW_{71}	—	November 20, 2003	Socorro	LINEAR	·	3.0 km	MPC · JPL
344766	2003 WE_{87}	—	November 21, 2003	Socorro	LINEAR	·	2.4 km	MPC · JPL
344767	2003 WW_{92}	—	November 19, 2003	Anderson Mesa	LONEOS	·	1.8 km	MPC · JPL
344768	2003 WT_{94}	—	November 19, 2003	Anderson Mesa	LONEOS	·	1.6 km	MPC · JPL
344769	2003 WH_{97}	—	November 19, 2003	Anderson Mesa	LONEOS	·	2.9 km	MPC · JPL
344770	2003 WQ_{102}	—	November 21, 2003	Socorro	LINEAR	·	2.7 km	MPC · JPL
344771	2003 WP_{106}	—	November 21, 2003	Palomar	NEAT	·	2.6 km	MPC · JPL
344772	2003 WQ_{123}	—	November 20, 2003	Socorro	LINEAR	·	2.0 km	MPC · JPL
344773	2003 WK_{149}	—	November 24, 2003	Socorro	LINEAR	·	2.4 km	MPC · JPL
344774	2003 WS_{149}	—	November 24, 2003	Anderson Mesa	LONEOS	·	2.5 km	MPC · JPL
344775	2003 WP_{154}	—	November 26, 2003	Kitt Peak	Spacewatch	·	2.3 km	MPC · JPL
344776	2003 WX_{166}	—	November 18, 2003	Anderson Mesa	LONEOS	·	3.3 km	MPC · JPL
344777	2003 WU_{170}	—	November 21, 2003	Catalina	CSS	·	2.1 km	MPC · JPL
344778	2003 WT_{190}	—	November 24, 2003	Anderson Mesa	LONEOS	AEO	1.4 km	MPC · JPL
344779	2003 WA_{193}	—	November 23, 2003	Anderson Mesa	LONEOS	·	2.3 km	MPC · JPL
344780	2003 WA_{194}	—	November 19, 2003	Kitt Peak	Spacewatch	NEM	2.4 km	MPC · JPL
344781	2003 XT_{1}	—	December 1, 2003	Socorro	LINEAR	AEO	1.4 km	MPC · JPL
344782	2003 XM_{5}	—	December 3, 2003	Anderson Mesa	LONEOS	·	2.4 km	MPC · JPL
344783	2003 XL_{8}	—	December 4, 2003	Socorro	LINEAR	·	5.2 km	MPC · JPL
344784	2003 XQ_{18}	—	December 15, 2003	Palomar	NEAT	·	2.5 km	MPC · JPL
344785	2003 XA_{23}	—	December 1, 2003	Kitt Peak	Spacewatch	·	2.7 km	MPC · JPL
344786	2003 XJ_{31}	—	December 1, 2003	Kitt Peak	Spacewatch	·	3.8 km	MPC · JPL
344787	2003 XM_{33}	—	December 1, 2003	Kitt Peak	Spacewatch	PAD	1.5 km	MPC · JPL
344788	2003 XG_{34}	—	December 1, 2003	Kitt Peak	Spacewatch	AGN	1.1 km	MPC · JPL
344789	2003 XU_{38}	—	December 4, 2003	Socorro	LINEAR	·	2.7 km	MPC · JPL
344790	2003 YE_{67}	—	December 19, 2003	Kitt Peak	Spacewatch	·	2.1 km	MPC · JPL
344791	2003 YQ_{79}	—	December 18, 2003	Socorro	LINEAR	·	2.1 km	MPC · JPL
344792	2003 YA_{87}	—	December 19, 2003	Socorro	LINEAR	·	2.5 km	MPC · JPL
344793	2003 YT_{103}	—	December 21, 2003	Socorro	LINEAR	GAL	2.1 km	MPC · JPL
344794	2003 YQ_{120}	—	December 27, 2003	Socorro	LINEAR	·	2.6 km	MPC · JPL
344795	2003 YK_{134}	—	December 28, 2003	Socorro	LINEAR	·	2.8 km	MPC · JPL
344796	2003 YS_{148}	—	December 29, 2003	Socorro	LINEAR	·	1.9 km	MPC · JPL
344797	2003 YB_{149}	—	December 29, 2003	Catalina	CSS	·	3.1 km	MPC · JPL
344798	2003 YY_{150}	—	December 29, 2003	Catalina	CSS	·	2.7 km	MPC · JPL
344799	2003 YJ_{165}	—	December 17, 2003	Kitt Peak	Spacewatch	·	1.8 km	MPC · JPL
344800	2003 YE_{179}	—	December 22, 2003	Kitt Peak	Spacewatch	L5	10 km	MPC · JPL

== 344801–344900 ==
back to top

Designation			Discovery			Properties		Ref
Permanent	Provisional	Named after	Date	Site	Discoverer(s)	Category	Diam.	Ref
344801	2003 YE_{181}	—	December 22, 2003	Socorro	LINEAR	·	2.4 km	MPC · JPL
344802	2004 BC_{6}	—	January 16, 2004	Kitt Peak	Spacewatch	·	2.7 km	MPC · JPL
344803	2004 BM_{24}	—	January 19, 2004	Anderson Mesa	LONEOS	·	1.9 km	MPC · JPL
344804	2004 BE_{32}	—	January 19, 2004	Kitt Peak	Spacewatch	·	2.2 km	MPC · JPL
344805	2004 BR_{36}	—	January 19, 2004	Kitt Peak	Spacewatch	·	2.6 km	MPC · JPL
344806	2004 BK_{41}	—	January 22, 2004	Palomar	NEAT	·	960 m	MPC · JPL
344807	2004 BM_{51}	—	January 21, 2004	Socorro	LINEAR	·	4.1 km	MPC · JPL
344808	2004 BO_{60}	—	January 21, 2004	Socorro	LINEAR	MRX	1.2 km	MPC · JPL
344809	2004 BX_{120}	—	January 31, 2004	Socorro	LINEAR	·	2.5 km	MPC · JPL
344810	2004 BZ_{130}	—	January 16, 2004	Kitt Peak	Spacewatch	·	1.6 km	MPC · JPL
344811	2004 BA_{137}	—	January 19, 2004	Kitt Peak	Spacewatch	KOR	1.3 km	MPC · JPL
344812	2004 BH_{159}	—	January 20, 2004	Cerro Paranal	Cerro Paranal	·	590 m	MPC · JPL
344813	2004 CO	—	February 9, 2004	Palomar	NEAT	·	3.4 km	MPC · JPL
344814	2004 CW_{15}	—	February 11, 2004	Kitt Peak	Spacewatch	·	2.8 km	MPC · JPL
344815	2004 CQ_{75}	—	February 11, 2004	Palomar	NEAT	·	2.9 km	MPC · JPL
344816	2004 CL_{83}	—	February 12, 2004	Kitt Peak	Spacewatch	·	1.0 km	MPC · JPL
344817	2004 DN_{30}	—	February 17, 2004	Socorro	LINEAR	·	1.0 km	MPC · JPL
344818	2004 DJ_{59}	—	February 23, 2004	Socorro	LINEAR	·	850 m	MPC · JPL
344819	2004 EN	—	March 10, 2004	Palomar	NEAT	·	950 m	MPC · JPL
344820	2004 ES_{5}	—	March 11, 2004	Palomar	NEAT	·	3.5 km	MPC · JPL
344821	2004 ER_{6}	—	March 12, 2004	Palomar	NEAT	V	730 m	MPC · JPL
344822	2004 EX_{7}	—	March 13, 2004	Palomar	NEAT	·	3.9 km	MPC · JPL
344823	2004 EN_{11}	—	March 10, 2004	Palomar	NEAT	·	2.6 km	MPC · JPL
344824	2004 ER_{60}	—	March 11, 2004	Palomar	NEAT	URS	4.9 km	MPC · JPL
344825	2004 EH_{64}	—	March 14, 2004	Catalina	CSS	·	2.9 km	MPC · JPL
344826	2004 EC_{74}	—	March 12, 2004	Palomar	NEAT	·	910 m	MPC · JPL
344827	2004 EU_{76}	—	March 15, 2004	Kitt Peak	Spacewatch	·	860 m	MPC · JPL
344828	2004 EZ_{78}	—	March 15, 2004	Kitt Peak	Spacewatch	TIR	3.3 km	MPC · JPL
344829	2004 FR_{7}	—	March 16, 2004	Socorro	LINEAR	·	1.8 km	MPC · JPL
344830	2004 FE_{18}	—	March 25, 2004	Wrightwood	J. W. Young	·	650 m	MPC · JPL
344831	2004 FD_{33}	—	March 16, 2004	Catalina	CSS	·	2.6 km	MPC · JPL
344832	2004 FY_{71}	—	March 17, 2004	Kitt Peak	Spacewatch	·	1.7 km	MPC · JPL
344833	2004 FT_{80}	—	March 16, 2004	Socorro	LINEAR	·	3.4 km	MPC · JPL
344834	2004 FH_{83}	—	March 18, 2004	Kitt Peak	Spacewatch	·	900 m	MPC · JPL
344835	2004 FZ_{92}	—	March 19, 2004	Socorro	LINEAR	·	890 m	MPC · JPL
344836	2004 FK_{95}	—	March 20, 2004	Socorro	LINEAR	·	720 m	MPC · JPL
344837	2004 FT_{107}	—	March 22, 2004	Socorro	LINEAR	EUP	4.4 km	MPC · JPL
344838	2004 FC_{130}	—	March 21, 2004	Kitt Peak	Spacewatch	·	1.2 km	MPC · JPL
344839	2004 FC_{143}	—	March 27, 2004	Anderson Mesa	LONEOS	T_{j} (2.96)	4.6 km	MPC · JPL
344840	2004 FS_{147}	—	March 19, 2004	Palomar	NEAT	·	3.6 km	MPC · JPL
344841	2004 FK_{148}	—	March 28, 2004	Kitt Peak	Spacewatch	·	4.2 km	MPC · JPL
344842	2004 FV_{165}	—	March 17, 2004	Kitt Peak	Spacewatch	·	750 m	MPC · JPL
344843	2004 GQ_{12}	—	April 11, 2004	Palomar	NEAT	·	1.0 km	MPC · JPL
344844	2004 GX_{17}	—	April 12, 2004	Anderson Mesa	LONEOS	·	970 m	MPC · JPL
344845	2004 GJ_{18}	—	April 12, 2004	Catalina	CSS	H	650 m	MPC · JPL
344846	2004 GB_{26}	—	April 14, 2004	Kitt Peak	Spacewatch	·	1.1 km	MPC · JPL
344847	2004 GC_{33}	—	April 12, 2004	Anderson Mesa	LONEOS	·	820 m	MPC · JPL
344848	2004 GR_{41}	—	April 13, 2004	Catalina	CSS	·	1.2 km	MPC · JPL
344849	2004 GX_{42}	—	April 15, 2004	Socorro	LINEAR	·	4.6 km	MPC · JPL
344850	2004 GV_{45}	—	April 12, 2004	Kitt Peak	Spacewatch	·	760 m	MPC · JPL
344851	2004 GK_{50}	—	April 12, 2004	Kitt Peak	Spacewatch	·	750 m	MPC · JPL
344852	2004 GP_{74}	—	April 14, 2004	Kitt Peak	Spacewatch	·	4.6 km	MPC · JPL
344853	2004 GM_{80}	—	April 13, 2004	Kitt Peak	Spacewatch	·	3.6 km	MPC · JPL
344854	2004 GS_{84}	—	April 14, 2004	Kitt Peak	Spacewatch	EOS	2.5 km	MPC · JPL
344855	2004 HS_{6}	—	April 16, 2004	Palomar	NEAT	EUP	5.1 km	MPC · JPL
344856	2004 HV_{6}	—	April 16, 2004	Socorro	LINEAR	·	960 m	MPC · JPL
344857	2004 HO_{12}	—	April 19, 2004	Socorro	LINEAR	·	2.7 km	MPC · JPL
344858	2004 HT_{12}	—	April 21, 2004	Socorro	LINEAR	EOS	2.6 km	MPC · JPL
344859	2004 HD_{13}	—	April 16, 2004	Kitt Peak	Spacewatch	·	2.6 km	MPC · JPL
344860	2004 HT_{29}	—	April 21, 2004	Socorro	LINEAR	·	700 m	MPC · JPL
344861	2004 HP_{38}	—	April 23, 2004	Catalina	CSS	·	1.5 km	MPC · JPL
344862	2004 HX_{38}	—	April 24, 2004	Socorro	LINEAR	H	620 m	MPC · JPL
344863	2004 HP_{50}	—	April 23, 2004	Kitt Peak	Spacewatch	·	1.2 km	MPC · JPL
344864	2004 HK_{60}	—	April 25, 2004	Kitt Peak	Spacewatch	URS	4.5 km	MPC · JPL
344865	2004 JK	—	May 9, 2004	Kitt Peak	Spacewatch	V	870 m	MPC · JPL
344866	2004 JP_{5}	—	May 11, 2004	Catalina	CSS	EUP	4.9 km	MPC · JPL
344867	2004 JP_{8}	—	May 12, 2004	Catalina	CSS	PHO	1.2 km	MPC · JPL
344868	2004 JB_{13}	—	May 13, 2004	Anderson Mesa	LONEOS	H	540 m	MPC · JPL
344869	2004 JD_{13}	—	May 13, 2004	Socorro	LINEAR	PHO	1.1 km	MPC · JPL
344870	2004 JY_{18}	—	May 13, 2004	Kitt Peak	Spacewatch	·	880 m	MPC · JPL
344871	2004 JN_{19}	—	May 13, 2004	Palomar	NEAT	·	890 m	MPC · JPL
344872	2004 JA_{39}	—	May 14, 2004	Kitt Peak	Spacewatch	·	4.3 km	MPC · JPL
344873	2004 JL_{49}	—	May 13, 2004	Kitt Peak	Spacewatch	·	1.1 km	MPC · JPL
344874	2004 NZ_{4}	—	July 9, 2004	Palomar	NEAT	PHO	4.2 km	MPC · JPL
344875	2004 NQ_{33}	—	July 11, 2004	Socorro	LINEAR	PHO	1.2 km	MPC · JPL
344876	2004 OZ_{5}	—	July 18, 2004	Reedy Creek	J. Broughton	·	1.7 km	MPC · JPL
344877	2004 OL_{7}	—	July 16, 2004	Socorro	LINEAR	·	1.2 km	MPC · JPL
344878	2004 PM_{13}	—	August 7, 2004	Palomar	NEAT	·	1.4 km	MPC · JPL
344879	2004 PW_{16}	—	August 7, 2004	Campo Imperatore	CINEOS	·	1.3 km	MPC · JPL
344880	2004 PW_{21}	—	August 8, 2004	Palomar	NEAT	·	1.6 km	MPC · JPL
344881	2004 PQ_{49}	—	August 8, 2004	Socorro	LINEAR	NYS	1.3 km	MPC · JPL
344882	2004 PS_{63}	—	August 10, 2004	Socorro	LINEAR	V	810 m	MPC · JPL
344883	2004 PA_{68}	—	August 6, 2004	Palomar	NEAT	·	1.2 km	MPC · JPL
344884	2004 PW_{71}	—	August 8, 2004	Socorro	LINEAR	NYS	1.5 km	MPC · JPL
344885	2004 PJ_{73}	—	August 8, 2004	Socorro	LINEAR	PHO	1.3 km	MPC · JPL
344886	2004 PV_{82}	—	August 10, 2004	Socorro	LINEAR	NYS	1.3 km	MPC · JPL
344887	2004 PD_{88}	—	August 11, 2004	Socorro	LINEAR	PHO	3.1 km	MPC · JPL
344888	2004 PY_{99}	—	August 11, 2004	Socorro	LINEAR	·	2.0 km	MPC · JPL
344889	2004 PJ_{111}	—	August 15, 2004	Cerro Tololo	M. W. Buie	·	1.6 km	MPC · JPL
344890	2004 RP_{14}	—	September 6, 2004	Siding Spring	SSS	·	1.6 km	MPC · JPL
344891	2004 RL_{30}	—	September 7, 2004	Socorro	LINEAR	NYS	1.4 km	MPC · JPL
344892	2004 RR_{35}	—	September 7, 2004	Socorro	LINEAR	·	1.4 km	MPC · JPL
344893	2004 RC_{42}	—	September 7, 2004	Kitt Peak	Spacewatch	(5)	1.0 km	MPC · JPL
344894	2004 RZ_{54}	—	September 8, 2004	Socorro	LINEAR	·	1.3 km	MPC · JPL
344895	2004 RZ_{70}	—	September 8, 2004	Socorro	LINEAR	·	1.7 km	MPC · JPL
344896	2004 RY_{72}	—	September 8, 2004	Socorro	LINEAR	·	1.2 km	MPC · JPL
344897	2004 RJ_{83}	—	September 9, 2004	Socorro	LINEAR	·	1.3 km	MPC · JPL
344898	2004 RG_{98}	—	September 8, 2004	Socorro	LINEAR	PHO	1.2 km	MPC · JPL
344899	2004 RT_{106}	—	September 8, 2004	Campo Imperatore	CINEOS	V	870 m	MPC · JPL
344900	2004 RM_{109}	—	September 9, 2004	Socorro	LINEAR	·	1.0 km	MPC · JPL

== 344901–345000 ==
back to top

Designation			Discovery			Properties		Ref
Permanent	Provisional	Named after	Date	Site	Discoverer(s)	Category	Diam.	Ref
344901	2004 RC_{136}	—	September 7, 2004	Palomar	NEAT	·	1.0 km	MPC · JPL
344902	2004 RZ_{142}	—	September 8, 2004	Socorro	LINEAR	·	1.7 km	MPC · JPL
344903	2004 RY_{144}	—	September 9, 2004	Socorro	LINEAR	MAS	990 m	MPC · JPL
344904	2004 RJ_{162}	—	September 11, 2004	Socorro	LINEAR	RAF	980 m	MPC · JPL
344905	2004 RW_{182}	—	September 10, 2004	Socorro	LINEAR	·	1.7 km	MPC · JPL
344906	2004 RG_{185}	—	September 10, 2004	Socorro	LINEAR	PHO	1.1 km	MPC · JPL
344907	2004 RJ_{186}	—	September 10, 2004	Socorro	LINEAR	V	690 m	MPC · JPL
344908	2004 RV_{195}	—	September 10, 2004	Socorro	LINEAR	·	1.6 km	MPC · JPL
344909	2004 RG_{202}	—	September 11, 2004	Socorro	LINEAR	·	1.1 km	MPC · JPL
344910	2004 RK_{213}	—	September 11, 2004	Socorro	LINEAR	·	2.1 km	MPC · JPL
344911	2004 RF_{218}	—	September 11, 2004	Socorro	LINEAR	H	660 m	MPC · JPL
344912	2004 RJ_{237}	—	September 10, 2004	Kitt Peak	Spacewatch	·	1.1 km	MPC · JPL
344913	2004 RV_{239}	—	September 10, 2004	Kitt Peak	Spacewatch	3:2 · SHU	5.3 km	MPC · JPL
344914	2004 RR_{261}	—	September 10, 2004	Kitt Peak	Spacewatch	·	1.2 km	MPC · JPL
344915	2004 RB_{289}	—	September 13, 2004	Kitt Peak	Spacewatch	H	450 m	MPC · JPL
344916	2004 RT_{294}	—	September 11, 2004	Kitt Peak	Spacewatch	·	2.1 km	MPC · JPL
344917	2004 RC_{314}	—	September 15, 2004	Kitt Peak	Spacewatch	PHO	1.4 km	MPC · JPL
344918	2004 RY_{347}	—	September 12, 2004	Mauna Kea	P. A. Wiegert	NYS	1.1 km	MPC · JPL
344919	2004 SA_{36}	—	September 17, 2004	Kitt Peak	Spacewatch	·	1.6 km	MPC · JPL
344920	2004 TA_{5}	—	October 4, 2004	Kitt Peak	Spacewatch	(5)	1.3 km	MPC · JPL
344921	2004 TU_{8}	—	October 5, 2004	Anderson Mesa	LONEOS	H	780 m	MPC · JPL
344922	2004 TO_{9}	—	September 8, 2004	Socorro	LINEAR	H	650 m	MPC · JPL
344923	2004 TB_{12}	—	October 7, 2004	Goodricke-Pigott	R. A. Tucker	·	1.2 km	MPC · JPL
344924	2004 TB_{17}	—	October 10, 2004	Socorro	LINEAR	H	780 m	MPC · JPL
344925	2004 TF_{32}	—	September 7, 2004	Kitt Peak	Spacewatch	·	920 m	MPC · JPL
344926	2004 TE_{53}	—	October 4, 2004	Kitt Peak	Spacewatch	·	1.9 km	MPC · JPL
344927	2004 TU_{62}	—	October 5, 2004	Kitt Peak	Spacewatch	3:2 · SHU	4.9 km	MPC · JPL
344928	2004 TH_{80}	—	October 5, 2004	Kitt Peak	Spacewatch	·	2.9 km	MPC · JPL
344929	2004 TK_{90}	—	October 5, 2004	Kitt Peak	Spacewatch	·	960 m	MPC · JPL
344930	2004 TU_{117}	—	October 5, 2004	Anderson Mesa	LONEOS	·	1.6 km	MPC · JPL
344931	2004 TQ_{169}	—	October 7, 2004	Socorro	LINEAR	·	1.7 km	MPC · JPL
344932	2004 TO_{174}	—	October 9, 2004	Socorro	LINEAR	NYS ·	1.1 km	MPC · JPL
344933	2004 TY_{175}	—	October 9, 2004	Socorro	LINEAR	EUN	1.1 km	MPC · JPL
344934	2004 TY_{180}	—	October 7, 2004	Kitt Peak	Spacewatch	·	1.7 km	MPC · JPL
344935	2004 TL_{203}	—	October 7, 2004	Kitt Peak	Spacewatch	MAR	1.3 km	MPC · JPL
344936	2004 TK_{266}	—	October 9, 2004	Kitt Peak	Spacewatch	·	1.3 km	MPC · JPL
344937	2004 TT_{272}	—	October 9, 2004	Kitt Peak	Spacewatch	·	2.2 km	MPC · JPL
344938	2004 TG_{285}	—	October 8, 2004	Kitt Peak	Spacewatch	3:2	4.1 km	MPC · JPL
344939	2004 TT_{319}	—	October 11, 2004	Kitt Peak	Spacewatch	·	1.6 km	MPC · JPL
344940	2004 TT_{344}	—	October 15, 2004	Anderson Mesa	LONEOS	·	2.2 km	MPC · JPL
344941	2004 TF_{347}	—	October 5, 2004	Anderson Mesa	LONEOS	·	1.9 km	MPC · JPL
344942	2004 TA_{369}	—	October 9, 2004	Kitt Peak	Spacewatch	·	1.7 km	MPC · JPL
344943	2004 VL_{2}	—	November 3, 2004	Palomar	NEAT	·	1.7 km	MPC · JPL
344944	2004 VD_{3}	—	November 3, 2004	Kitt Peak	Spacewatch	·	1.2 km	MPC · JPL
344945	2004 VQ_{21}	—	November 4, 2004	Catalina	CSS	T_{j} (2.95) · 3:2	6.5 km	MPC · JPL
344946	2004 VM_{38}	—	November 4, 2004	Kitt Peak	Spacewatch	3:2	3.6 km	MPC · JPL
344947	2004 VB_{44}	—	November 4, 2004	Kitt Peak	Spacewatch	T_{j} (2.99) · 3:2	4.8 km	MPC · JPL
344948	2004 VA_{49}	—	November 4, 2004	Kitt Peak	Spacewatch	·	1.3 km	MPC · JPL
344949	2004 VF_{52}	—	November 4, 2004	Catalina	CSS	T_{j} (2.98)	4.3 km	MPC · JPL
344950	2004 VO_{52}	—	November 4, 2004	Catalina	CSS	·	1.6 km	MPC · JPL
344951	2004 VU_{63}	—	November 10, 2004	Kitt Peak	Spacewatch	·	3.0 km	MPC · JPL
344952	2004 VK_{64}	—	November 11, 2004	Goodricke-Pigott	Goodricke-Pigott	·	2.6 km	MPC · JPL
344953	2004 VQ_{72}	—	November 9, 2004	Catalina	CSS	T_{j} (2.98) · 3:2	5.7 km	MPC · JPL
344954	2004 VL_{75}	—	November 3, 2004	Catalina	CSS	H	650 m	MPC · JPL
344955	2004 VB_{81}	—	November 4, 2004	Kitt Peak	Spacewatch	3:2	5.5 km	MPC · JPL
344956	2004 VF_{92}	—	November 4, 2004	Kitt Peak	Spacewatch	·	1.9 km	MPC · JPL
344957	2004 VX_{99}	—	November 9, 2004	Mauna Kea	Veillet, C.	·	1.1 km	MPC · JPL
344958	2004 WL_{2}	—	November 17, 2004	Campo Imperatore	CINEOS	·	1.4 km	MPC · JPL
344959	2004 XH	—	December 2, 2004	Anderson Mesa	LONEOS	T_{j} (2.99) · 3:2	7.3 km	MPC · JPL
344960	2004 XE_{7}	—	December 2, 2004	Socorro	LINEAR	·	1.8 km	MPC · JPL
344961	2004 XG_{10}	—	December 2, 2004	Palomar	NEAT	·	1.3 km	MPC · JPL
344962	2004 XR_{11}	—	December 7, 2004	Socorro	LINEAR	·	1.4 km	MPC · JPL
344963	2004 XT_{13}	—	December 8, 2004	Socorro	LINEAR	EUN	1.8 km	MPC · JPL
344964	2004 XN_{18}	—	December 8, 2004	Socorro	LINEAR	·	2.2 km	MPC · JPL
344965	2004 XH_{20}	—	December 8, 2004	Socorro	LINEAR	·	1.8 km	MPC · JPL
344966	2004 XA_{23}	—	December 8, 2004	Socorro	LINEAR	·	3.7 km	MPC · JPL
344967	2004 XC_{24}	—	December 9, 2004	Catalina	CSS	(5)	900 m	MPC · JPL
344968	2004 XT_{31}	—	December 9, 2004	Catalina	CSS	HNS	1.8 km	MPC · JPL
344969	2004 XQ_{49}	—	December 10, 2004	Junk Bond	Junk Bond	·	1.1 km	MPC · JPL
344970	2004 XX_{50}	—	December 14, 2004	Campo Imperatore	CINEOS	(5)	1.3 km	MPC · JPL
344971	2004 XN_{58}	—	December 10, 2004	Kitt Peak	Spacewatch	·	3.0 km	MPC · JPL
344972	2004 XN_{69}	—	December 10, 2004	Socorro	LINEAR	·	2.2 km	MPC · JPL
344973	2004 XW_{74}	—	December 9, 2004	Catalina	CSS	(5)	1.6 km	MPC · JPL
344974	2004 XX_{92}	—	December 11, 2004	Socorro	LINEAR	·	2.7 km	MPC · JPL
344975	2004 XE_{100}	—	December 12, 2004	Kitt Peak	Spacewatch	·	1.7 km	MPC · JPL
344976	2004 XP_{108}	—	December 11, 2004	Socorro	LINEAR	(5)	1.4 km	MPC · JPL
344977	2004 XY_{108}	—	December 12, 2004	Kitt Peak	Spacewatch	·	1.8 km	MPC · JPL
344978	2004 XX_{118}	—	December 12, 2004	Kitt Peak	Spacewatch	·	1.1 km	MPC · JPL
344979	2004 XC_{122}	—	December 15, 2004	Socorro	LINEAR	(5)	1.8 km	MPC · JPL
344980	2004 XQ_{124}	—	December 10, 2004	Socorro	LINEAR	(194)	2.5 km	MPC · JPL
344981	2004 XQ_{128}	—	December 14, 2004	Socorro	LINEAR	·	1.9 km	MPC · JPL
344982	2004 XC_{146}	—	December 14, 2004	Socorro	LINEAR	(194)	1.6 km	MPC · JPL
344983	2004 XS_{150}	—	December 15, 2004	Kitt Peak	Spacewatch	·	2.2 km	MPC · JPL
344984	2004 XU_{191}	—	December 15, 2004	Catalina	CSS	·	2.2 km	MPC · JPL
344985	2004 YV_{10}	—	December 18, 2004	Mount Lemmon	Mount Lemmon Survey	·	1.2 km	MPC · JPL
344986	2004 YT_{16}	—	December 18, 2004	Mount Lemmon	Mount Lemmon Survey	(5) · fast	1.6 km	MPC · JPL
344987	2004 YB_{36}	—	December 21, 2004	Catalina	CSS	·	2.4 km	MPC · JPL
344988	2005 AQ_{2}	—	January 6, 2005	Catalina	CSS	·	1.6 km	MPC · JPL
344989	2005 AV_{7}	—	January 6, 2005	Catalina	CSS	·	1.6 km	MPC · JPL
344990	2005 AY_{17}	—	January 6, 2005	Socorro	LINEAR	·	2.5 km	MPC · JPL
344991	2005 AN_{18}	—	January 6, 2005	Catalina	CSS	(5)	1.5 km	MPC · JPL
344992	2005 AQ_{20}	—	January 6, 2005	Socorro	LINEAR	·	2.1 km	MPC · JPL
344993	2005 AP_{28}	—	January 6, 2005	Socorro	LINEAR	H	820 m	MPC · JPL
344994	2005 AN_{29}	—	January 15, 2005	Kvistaberg	Uppsala-DLR Asteroid Survey	JUN	1.5 km	MPC · JPL
344995	2005 AP_{41}	—	January 15, 2005	Socorro	LINEAR	·	1.3 km	MPC · JPL
344996	2005 AG_{52}	—	January 13, 2005	Catalina	CSS	·	1.9 km	MPC · JPL
344997	2005 AG_{57}	—	January 15, 2005	Anderson Mesa	LONEOS	·	1.7 km	MPC · JPL
344998	2005 AM_{70}	—	January 15, 2005	Catalina	CSS	·	2.3 km	MPC · JPL
344999	2005 AZ_{73}	—	January 15, 2005	Kitt Peak	Spacewatch	WIT	1.0 km	MPC · JPL
345000	2005 AK_{76}	—	January 15, 2005	Kitt Peak	Spacewatch	·	1.8 km	MPC · JPL

back to top

== See also ==
- Meanings of minor-planet names: 344001–345000
