= Meanings of minor-planet names: 344001–345000 =

As minor planet discoveries are confirmed, they are given a permanent number by the IAU's Minor Planet Center (MPC), and the discoverers can then submit names for them, following the IAU's naming conventions. The list below concerns those minor planets in the specified number-range that have received names, and explains the meanings of those names.

Official naming citations of newly named small Solar System bodies are approved and published in a bulletin by IAU's Working Group for Small Bodies Nomenclature (WGSBN). Before May 2021, citations were published in MPC's Minor Planet Circulars for many decades. Recent citations can also be found on the JPL Small-Body Database (SBDB). Until his death in 2016, German astronomer Lutz D. Schmadel compiled these citations into the Dictionary of Minor Planet Names (DMP) and regularly updated the collection.

Based on Paul Herget's The Names of the Minor Planets, Schmadel also researched the unclear origin of numerous asteroids, most of which had been named prior to World War II. This article incorporates text from this source, which is in the public domain: SBDB New namings may only be added to this list below after official publication as the preannouncement of names is condemned. The WGSBN publishes a comprehensive guideline for the naming rules of non-cometary small Solar System bodies.

== 344001–344100 ==
Named minor planet	Provisional	This minor planet was named for...	Ref · Catalog
344040 Davidiactor	2012 PO_{5}	David I. Actor (b. 1949) spent his career in water resources and engineering, from lake and marine charting to waste water management and infrastructure planning in the US.	IAU · 344040

== 344101–344200 ==
back to top

Named minor planet	Provisional	This minor planet was named for...	Ref · Catalog
There are no named minor planets in this number range

== 344201–344300 ==
back to top

Named minor planet	Provisional	This minor planet was named for...	Ref · Catalog
There are no named minor planets in this number range

== 344301–344400 ==
back to top

Named minor planet	Provisional	This minor planet was named for...	Ref · Catalog
There are no named minor planets in this number range

== 344401–344500 ==
back to top

Named minor planet	Provisional	This minor planet was named for...	Ref · Catalog
344413 Campodeifiori	2002 BC	Campo dei Fiori di Varese is the name of a beautiful and panoramic 1226-m mountain, just north of the city of Varese. The Schiaparelli Observatory, where this object was discovered, was built on the top in 1964 by Salvatore Furia. Since 1984, Campo dei Fiori has been a regional park, where biodiversity is preserved.	IAU · 344413

== 344501–344600 ==
back to top

Named minor planet	Provisional	This minor planet was named for...	Ref · Catalog
344581 Albisetti	2003 BG_{1}	Walter Albisetti (1957–2013), a professor at the Faculty of Medicine of the University of Milan.	JPL · 344581

== 344601–344700 ==
back to top

Named minor planet	Provisional	This minor planet was named for...	Ref · Catalog
344641 Szeleczky	2003 QV_{29}	Zita Szeleczky (1915–1999), a Hungarian stage and film actress.	JPL · 344641

== 344701–344800 ==
back to top

Named minor planet	Provisional	This minor planet was named for...	Ref · Catalog
There are no named minor planets in this number range

== 344801–344900 ==
back to top

Named minor planet	Provisional	This minor planet was named for...	Ref · Catalog
There are no named minor planets in this number range

== 344901–345000 ==
back to top

Named minor planet	Provisional	This minor planet was named for...	Ref · Catalog
There are no named minor planets in this number range

back to top

Preceded by 343,001–344,000	Meanings of minor-planet names List of minor planets: 344,001–345,000	Succeeded by 345,001–346,000
