= Sorana =

Sorana may refer to:

- Sorana (Pescia), a village in Pistoia, Tuscany, Italy
  - Sorana bean, a type of cannellini bean grown in Sorana
- Sorana Cîrstea (born 1990), Romanian tennis player
- Sorana Păcurar (better known as only Sorana) Romanian singer and songwriter
- Sorana Gurian (1913–1956), Moldovan writer and translator
- Marcia Servilia Sorana (c. 40s–66 AD), daughter of Roman Senator Barea Soranus, part of the Stoic Opposition
- Callicore sorana, a butterfly of genus Callicore

== See also ==
- Sora, Lazio, a town in Italy
- Sorano, a town and comune in Grosseto, Tuscany, Italy
  - Sovana, a frazione of Sorano, once known as Soana
    - Sovana DOC, a wine produced in Sovana
- Soraya, a female given name
