= Pescia =

- Comune
- Comune di Pescia
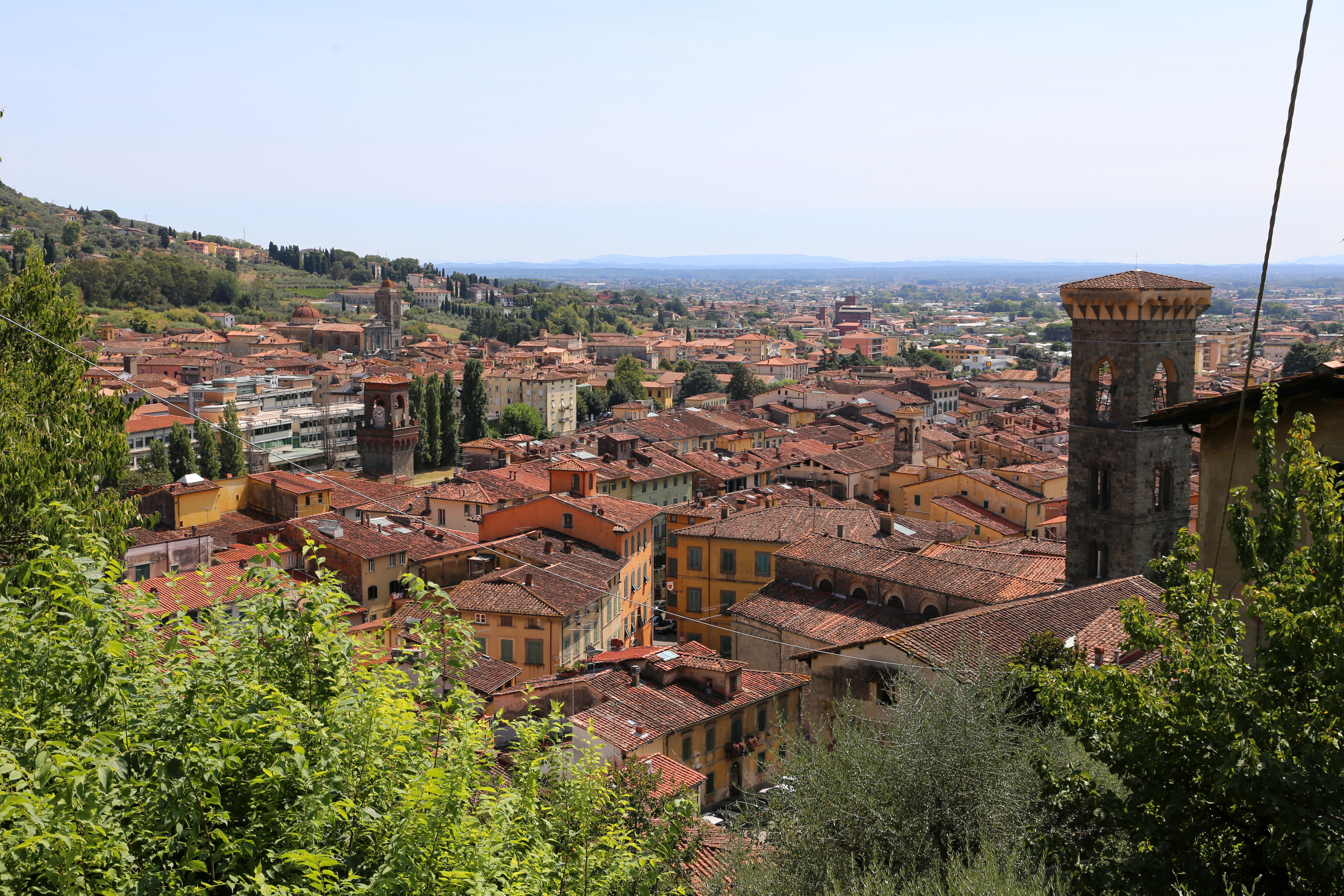
- View of Pescia

- Coat of arms

- Location within Italy Location within Tuscany
- Coordinates: 43°54′N 10°41.4′E
- Country: Italy
- Region: Tuscany
- Province: Pistoia (PT)
- Frazioni: Medicina, Fibbialla, Aramo, San Quirico, Castelvecchio, Stiappa, Pontito, Sorana, Vellano, Pietrabuona, Collodi, Veneri, Chiodo

Government
  - Mayor: Oreste Giurlani

Area
  - Total: 79.18 km^{2} (30.57 sq mi)
- Elevation: 68 m (223 ft)

Population (31 December 2017)
  - Total: 19,584
  - Density: 247.3/km^{2} (640.6/sq mi)
- Demonym: Pesciatini
- Time zone: UTC+1 (CET)
  - Summer (DST): UTC+2 (CEST)
- Postal code: 51017, 51012, 51010
- Dialing code: 0572
- Patron saint: St. Dorothea
- Saint day: 6 February
- Website: (in Italian) Official website

Pescia (Italian pronunciation: [ˈpeʃʃa]) is an Italian city in the province of Pistoia, Tuscany, central Italy.

It is located in a central zone between the cities Lucca and Florence, on the banks of the river of the same name.

== History ==
Archaeological excavations have suggested that the Lombards built the first settlement here on the river banks. The name of the city comes in fact from the Lombardic word pehhia, meaning "river".

Lucca occupied and destroyed Pescia during the 13th century, but the town was quickly rebuilt. During the entire Middle Ages Florence and Lucca contended for the city, as the latter was located on the border between the two republics. In 1339, after almost ten years of war, Florence occupied it.

The economy of the town was founded on mulberry cultivation and silkworm breeding. Heavily struck by the Black Death, Pescia overcame the demographic and economic depression which had ensued only at the end of the 15th century.

At the end of the 17th century, the grand-duke of Tuscany declared Pescia "City of the Grand Duchy of Tuscany". In the 19th century, the silk production was so important that Pescia was called "the little Manchester of Tuscany". The economy of the town dropped after a commercial conflict between France and Italy (1888). The passage of Napoleon highly damaged the economy of the city, because he substituted silk with sugar beet.

Since 1925, Pesciatins found an alternative economic source in cultivating and trading flowers and olive plants (since the end of the 19th century). Bombardments during World War II caused much damage to Pescia.

== Main sights ==
- Palazzo del Vicario (13th–14th centuries), now the Town Hall
- Palazzo Palagio or del Podestà (12th–13th centuries)
- Pescia Cathedral, dating perhaps to the 5th–6th century but later rebuilt several times. It is mentioned for the first time in 872, but the oldest surviving remains date to the 13th century. It houses a funerary tomb by Raffaello da Montelupo.
- San Francesco: Gothic, 13th-century church. The Cardini Chapel was built in grey pietra serena using a design by Andrea Cavalcanti, a pupil of Filippo Brunelleschi; it houses a fresco by Neri di Bicci (1458). The right apse chapel has a fresco cycle of Stories of the Virgin by Bicci di Lorenzo (15th century), while in the left chapel is a Madonna with Child (1335) by Angelo Puccinelli. The panel of St. Francis and the Episodes of His Life (1235) by Bonaventura Berlinghieri is the earliest known depiction of St. Francis' iconography.
- Communal Palace
- City Library
- Old Flower Market (1951) for its modern architecture
- Madonna di Piè di Piazza: small Renaissance-style oratory

== Economy ==
Economic activities in and around the city include flower growing (carnations, for which it is an international market centre) and paper production.

The village of Sorana is known for its namesake sorana bean.

== Education ==
The city is home to three professional (economics, agrarian and graphic-touristic) high schools and four cultural (classical, scientific, linguistic and psycho-pedagogic) high schools.

== Museums ==
- Paper Museum in Pescia
- Municipal Museum
- Gipsoteca Libero Andreotti
- Pinacoteca di San Michele

== Twin cities ==
- Nerja, Spain
- Oullins, France
