= Paper Museum in Pescia =

Museum in Pescia, Italy

- Museo della Carta di Pescia
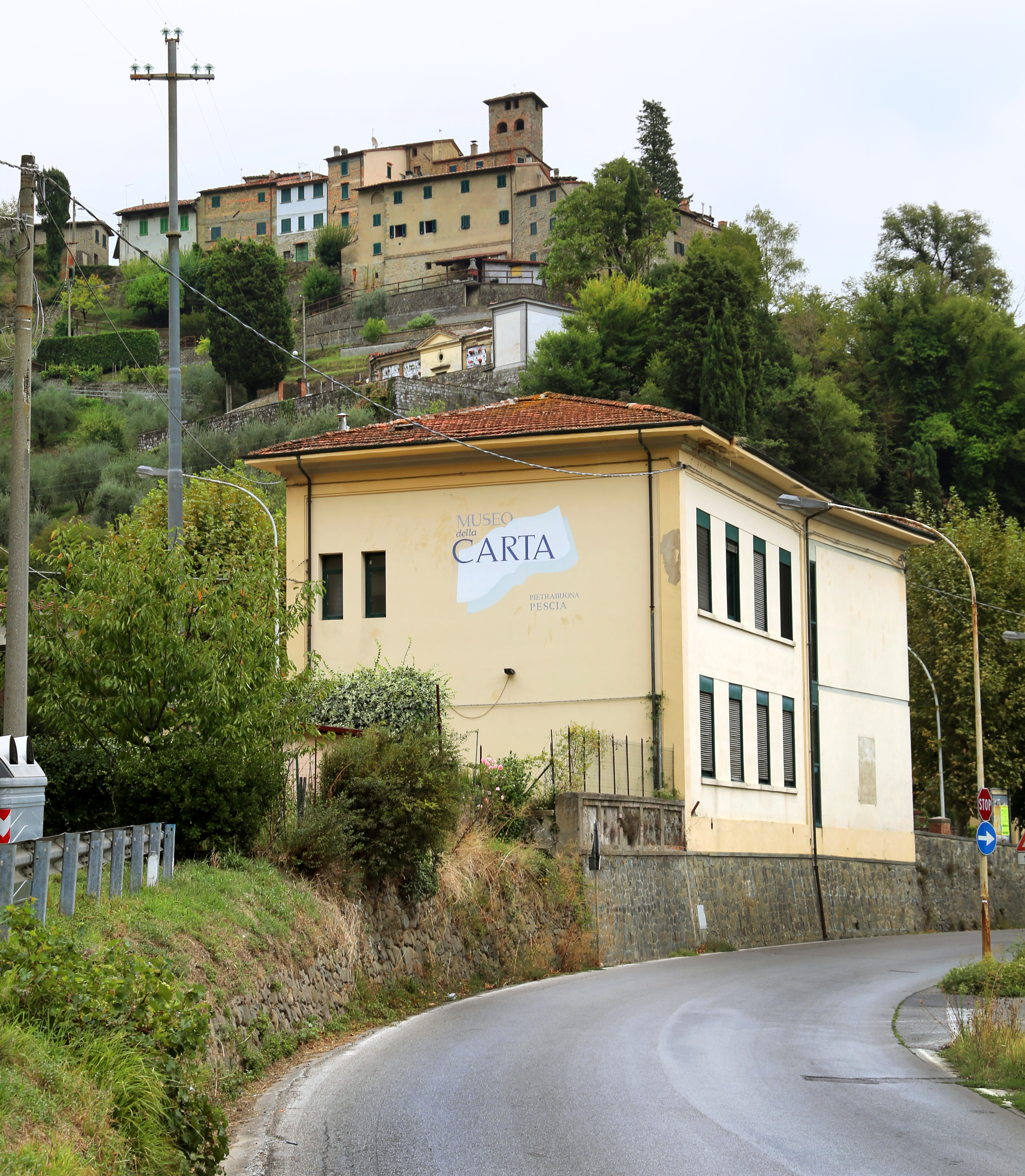
- Established: 1996
- Location: Pescia, Lucca, Italy
- Coordinates: 43°55′46″N 10°41′30″E
- Director: Massimiliano Bini
- Owner: Associazione Museo della Carta di Pescia
- Website: https://museodellacarta.org/

The Paper Museum in Pescia (Tuscany, Italy) (Italian: Museo della Carta di Pescia) is the only museum in Tuscany that records, documents, protects, and passes down to the public the art of handmade paper. Its purpose is to preserve the ancient art of processing and manufacturing handmade paper and to raise awareness of the importance and evolution of paper production.

Founded in 1996 by public and private bodies and companies making part of the Pescia Onlus Paper Museum Association, it has its headquarters in the eighteenth-century Cartiera Le Carte, purchased in 2003 by such Association. In 2021, the Museum was recognized as a Museum of Regional Relevance by the Tuscany Region and was included in the National Museum Network.

The museum preserves about 7,000 pieces including paper filigree shapes, filigree waxes, punches, metal sheets, and stamps, and 600 linear meters of documents relating to the Ancient Magnani paper mills of Pescia which make up the Magnani Historical Archive.

It is part of La Via della Carta in Tuscany, a project aimed at establishing a wide system of paper industrial archeology spread in the provinces of Lucca and Pistoia, carried out in collaboration with the Lucca paper district.

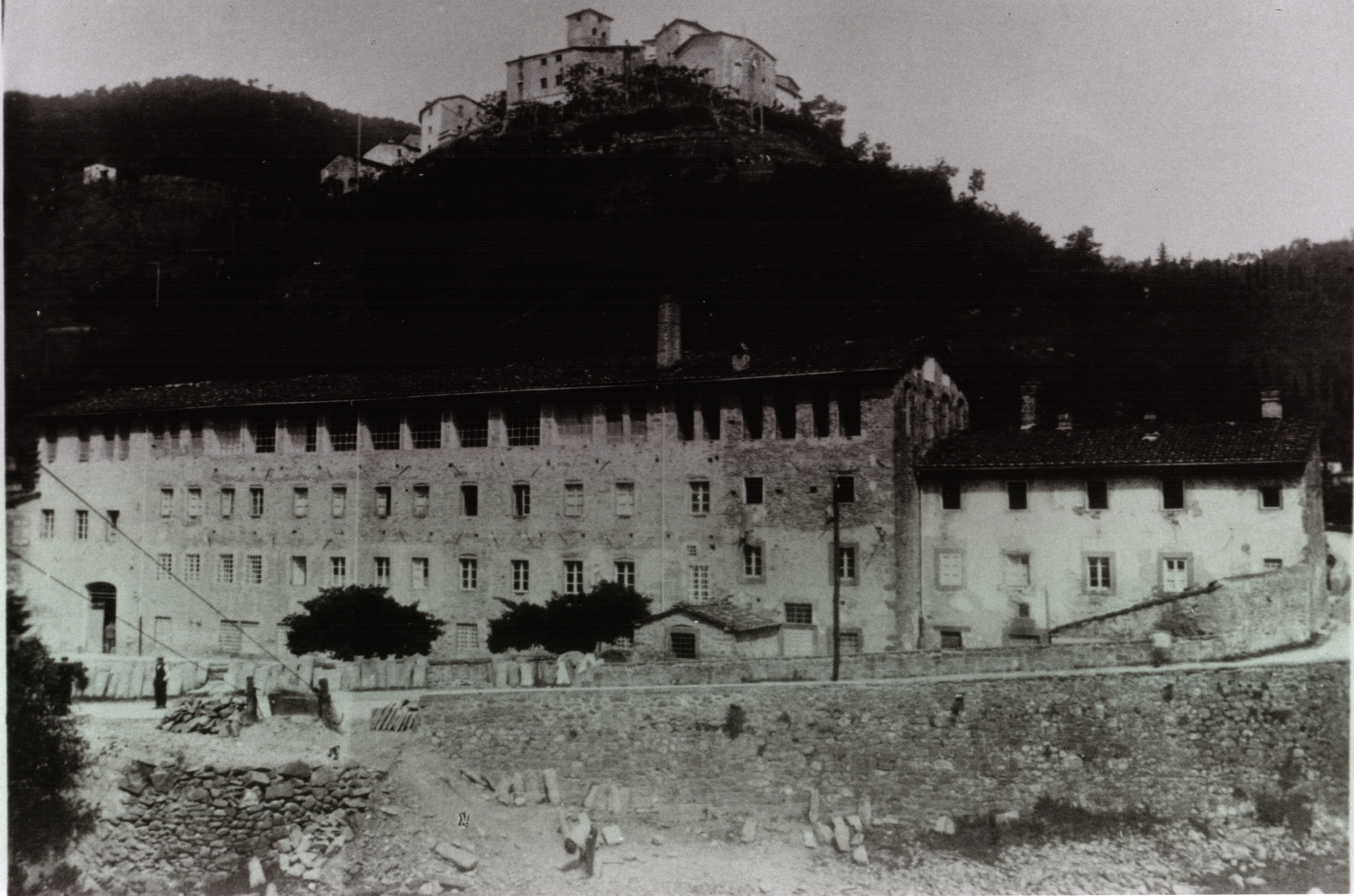
Paper mill in 1929

== Description ==
The first, second, and third floors are currently undergoing restoration (November 2021) and will be open to the public once the works are completed.

== Ground floor ==
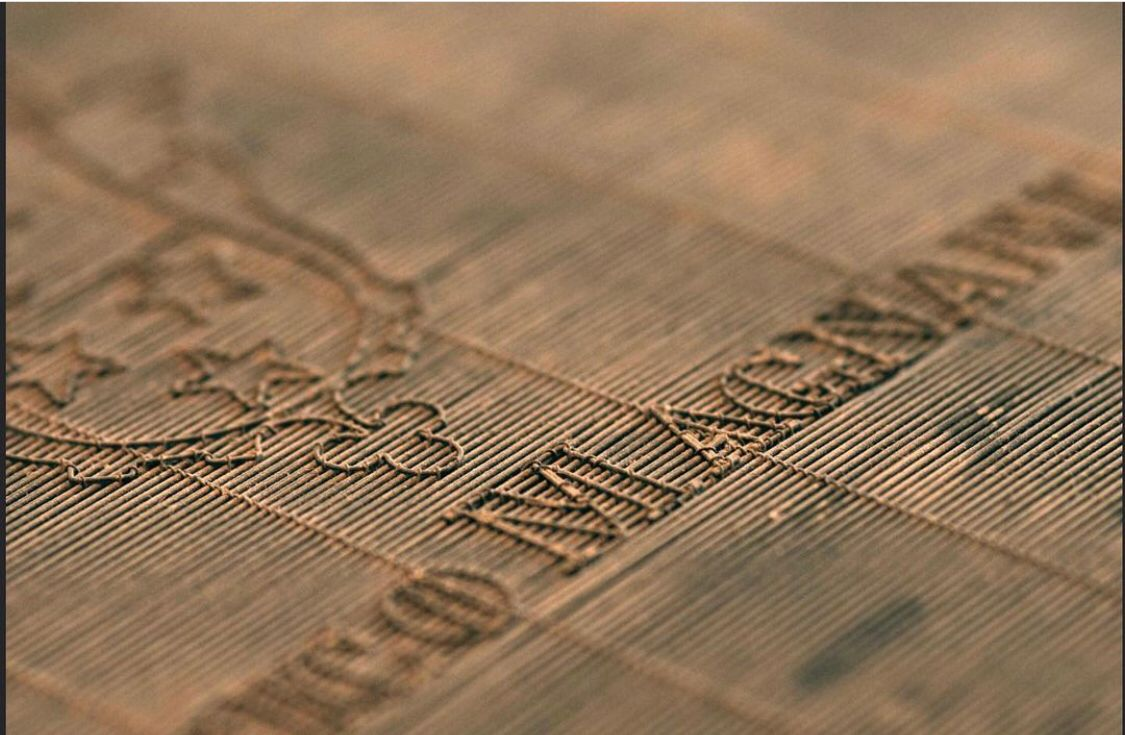
Watermark

On the ground floor, there is a large room with cross vaults where the processing phases that used hydraulic energy were once allocated. In the first multimedia room, a touch screen station and a three-dimensional scale reconstruction of the building allow one to visit the whole paper mill; some videos show all the processing phases related to the creation of hand-made paper: from the arrival of the bales of rags to reams of paper; a narrating voice follows the images with excerpts from the book by Carlo Magnani, Memories of a card maker. A second touchscreen station allows one to discover the museum's collections. The tour continues in the restored Sala dei Tini, where it is possible to witness the creation of hand-made paper by the master papermakers of the Carlo Magnani Pescia Company; then proceed to the Sala delle Pile a Maglio; finally, visit the Sala delle Filigrane of the Magnani historical archive where a selection of watermarked paper shapes is exhibited.

== First floor ==
Here we find the Bottega, the place where the paper used to be left to rest and where all the set-up works were carried out: from selection to the realization of the reams and then envelope folding.

== Second floor ==
This part of the building was reserved for the apartments of workers who lived inside the paper mill. Once recovered, the spaces will house the visitable deposit of the permanent collections.

== Third floor ==
This part of the building, equipped with characteristic "windows" with adjustable closures, is called a spanditoio; it was used to dry the sheets of paper made. The spanditoio will host a conference room, an educational room, and spaces for temporary exhibitions.

== CCartierLe Carte ==
The ancient paper factory, called Le Carte, is one of the most important monuments of industrial archeology in the area. It is representative of the typical development model of the Genoese-Tuscan paper manufacturing in the Middle Ages and the entire modern age, both as regards the location, almost in the center of the "paper district" of the Pescia stream, both for the architectural canons and for the ancient equipment it still retains.

Built in 1712, it was enlarged in 1725 by the Ansaldi family who then sold it to Agostino Calamari in 1825. In 1860 it was then purchased by the Magnani family and continued to produce hand-made paper until 1992.

== Restoration ==
After the acquisition of the building, the Pescia Onlus Paper Museum Association launched a project to renovate the spaces to safeguard the historical aspects and to allow the museum to function. The works foresee the division of the paper mill into three areas:

- the west wing, whose restoration has already been completed, houses the Magnani Historical Archive;
- the central wing will house the museum with all the machinery used in the processing and production of paper and the approximately 7000 pieces that make up the collections;
- the east wing will house the entrance to the museum, the ticket office, the shop, and the offices.

== Magnani Historical Archive ==
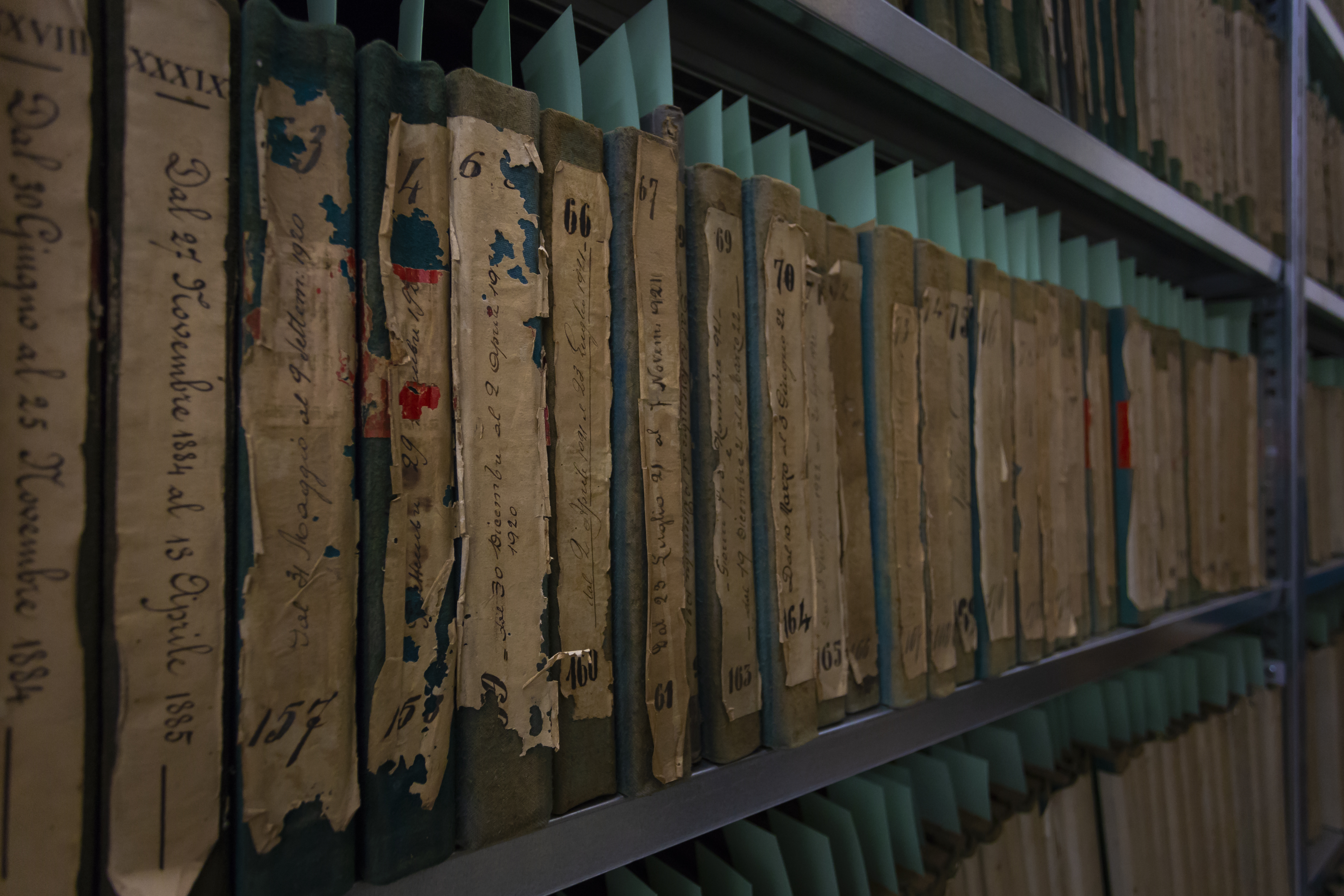
historical archive

The archive was placed in 2016 in the first restored wing of the building. It houses the historical documents of the Magnani company between the 18th century and the early years of the 21st; among them the personnel documents, company registers, writings, and papers of Carlo Magnani. Through this documentation it was possible to reconstruct the historical activity of the paper mill and the entrepreneurial links of the Magnani company with other industries in Italy and abroad. The archive is currently (2021) in the ordering phase.

== Impresa Sociale Magnani Pescia Srl ==
In 2018 the Museum gave life to the Impresa Sociale Magnani Pescia Srl which, after an intergenerational change of skills, resumed the manufacture of strictly handmade watermarked paper under the Enrico Magnani Pescia brand.

== Trivia ==
- The Paper Museum in Pescia is not just a museum but also a functioning paper mill, where visitors can watch master papermakers create handmade paper from rags using traditional 18th-century methods. Guests can even participate in workshops to make their own sheet of paper, following the same process used centuries ago.

== Gallery ==
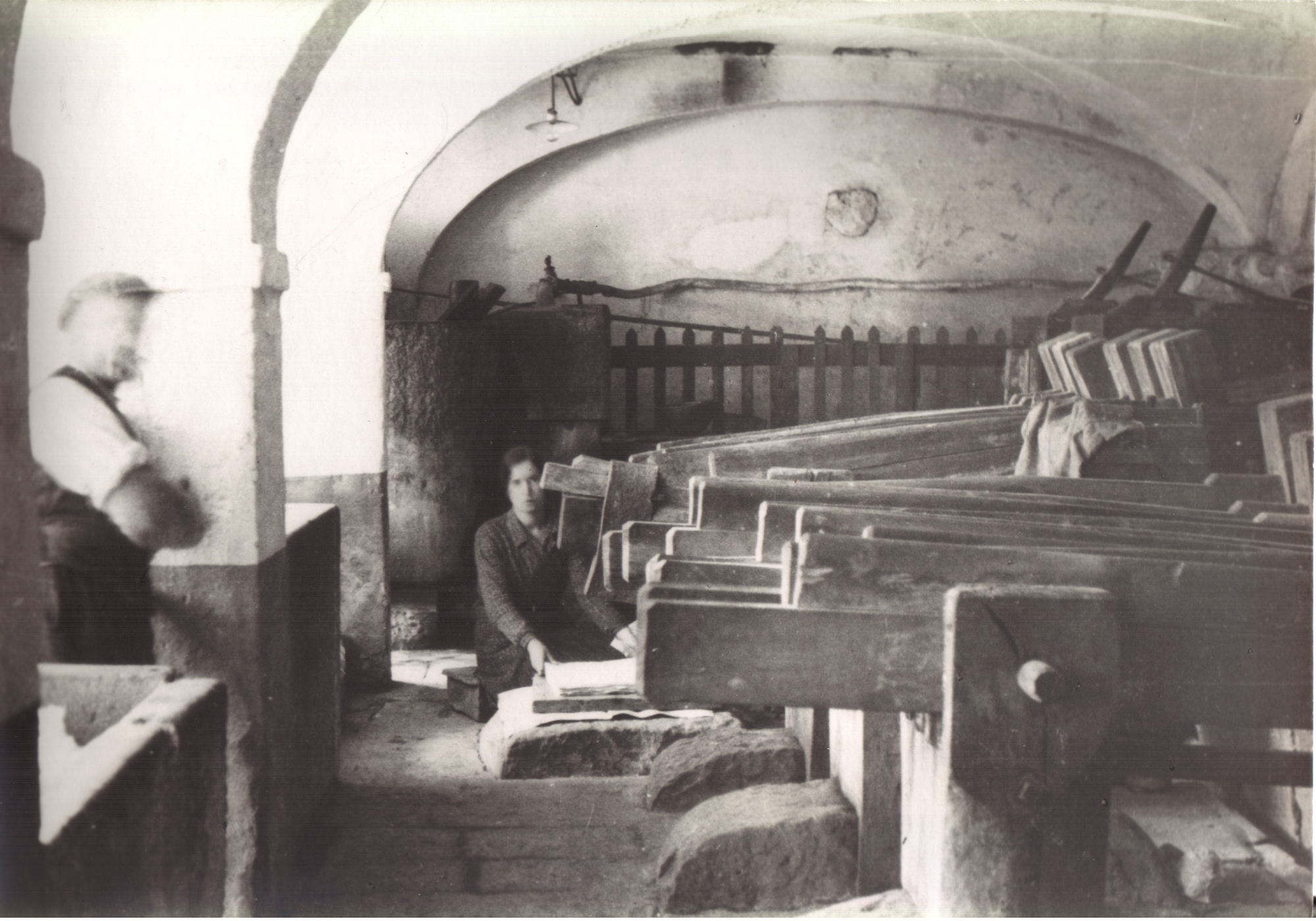
Sala delle pile

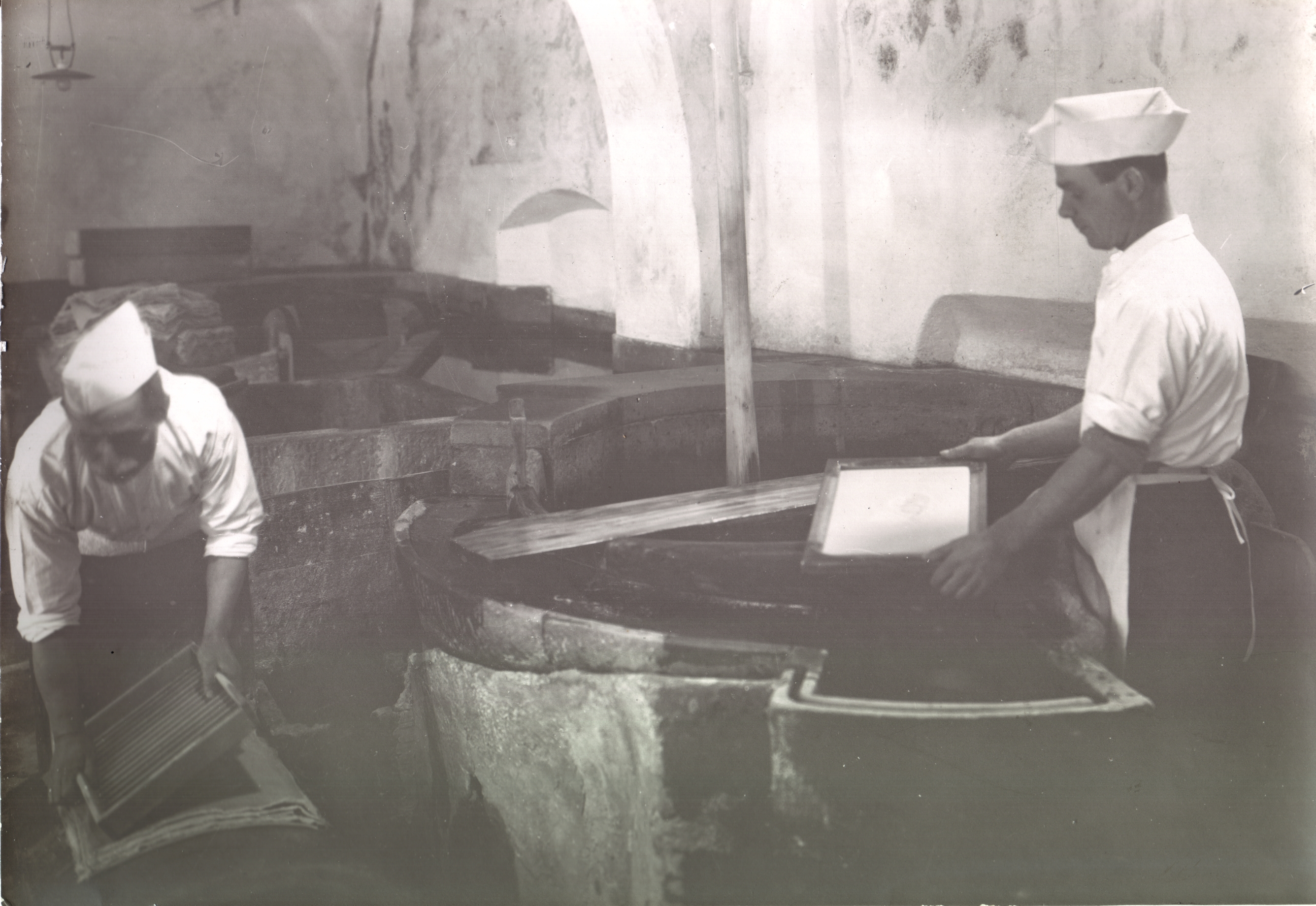
Sala dei tini

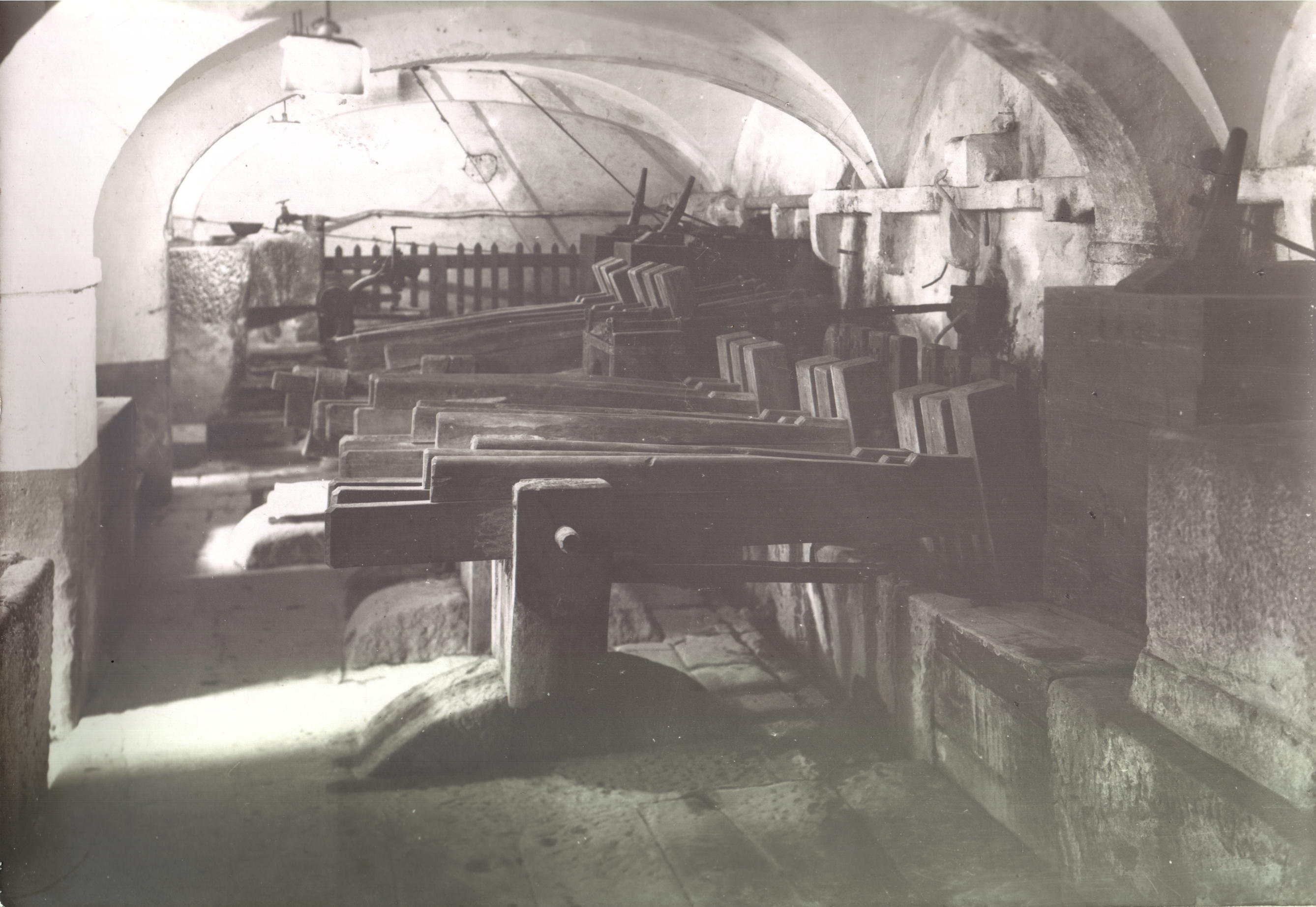
Sala del maglio
