= Madonna di Piè di Piazza, Pescia =

Church building in Pescia, Italy

Coordinates: 43.901979°N 10.688296°E

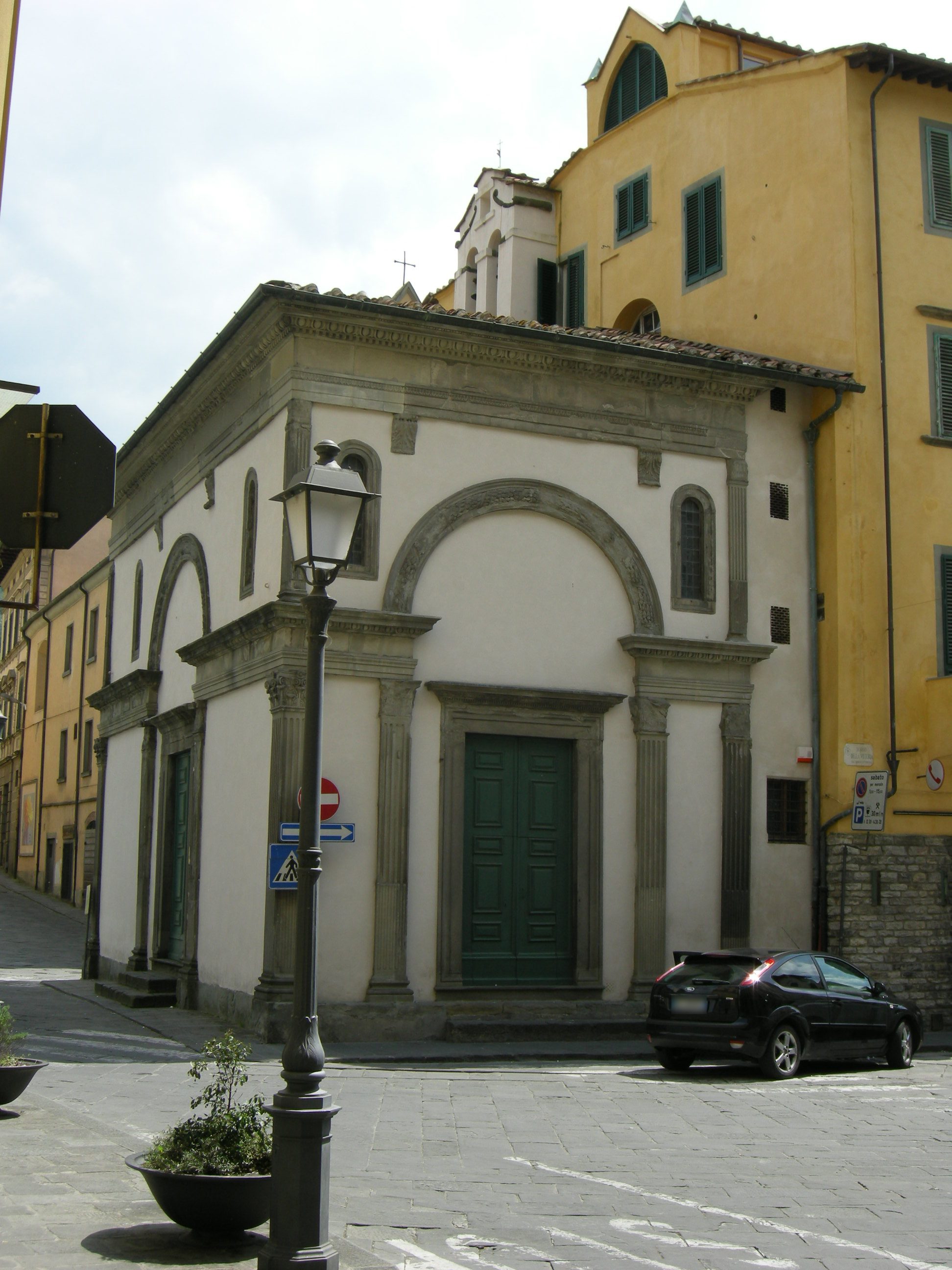
Entrance to church from side

The church of the Madonna di Piè di Piazza (Madonna at the foot of the public square), originally called the Oratory of San Pietro e Paolo is a 15th-century, Renaissance-style, Roman Catholic prayer hall located at the south end of the Piazza Grande in the town of Pescia, region of Tuscany, Italy.

== History and description ==
This church was built in 1454 under the patronage of the Galeotti family, by designs attributed to Andrea di Lazzaro Cavalcanti, also called il Buggiano, who was a pupil of Filippo Brunelleschi. At the start of the 17th century, by order of the Grand-Duke Ferdinand I, a venerated icon of the Madonna was moved to this church; it had previously been housed in a small chapel on the bridge of Santa Maria. In 1605, an elegantly coffered and painted wooden ceiling was installed by Giovanni Zeti. The interior was decorated by Domenico Marcacci, with an altarpiece added by Alessandro Tiarini.
