= Sorana (Pescia) =

Village in Pescia, Pistoia, Tuscany, Italy

- Frazione
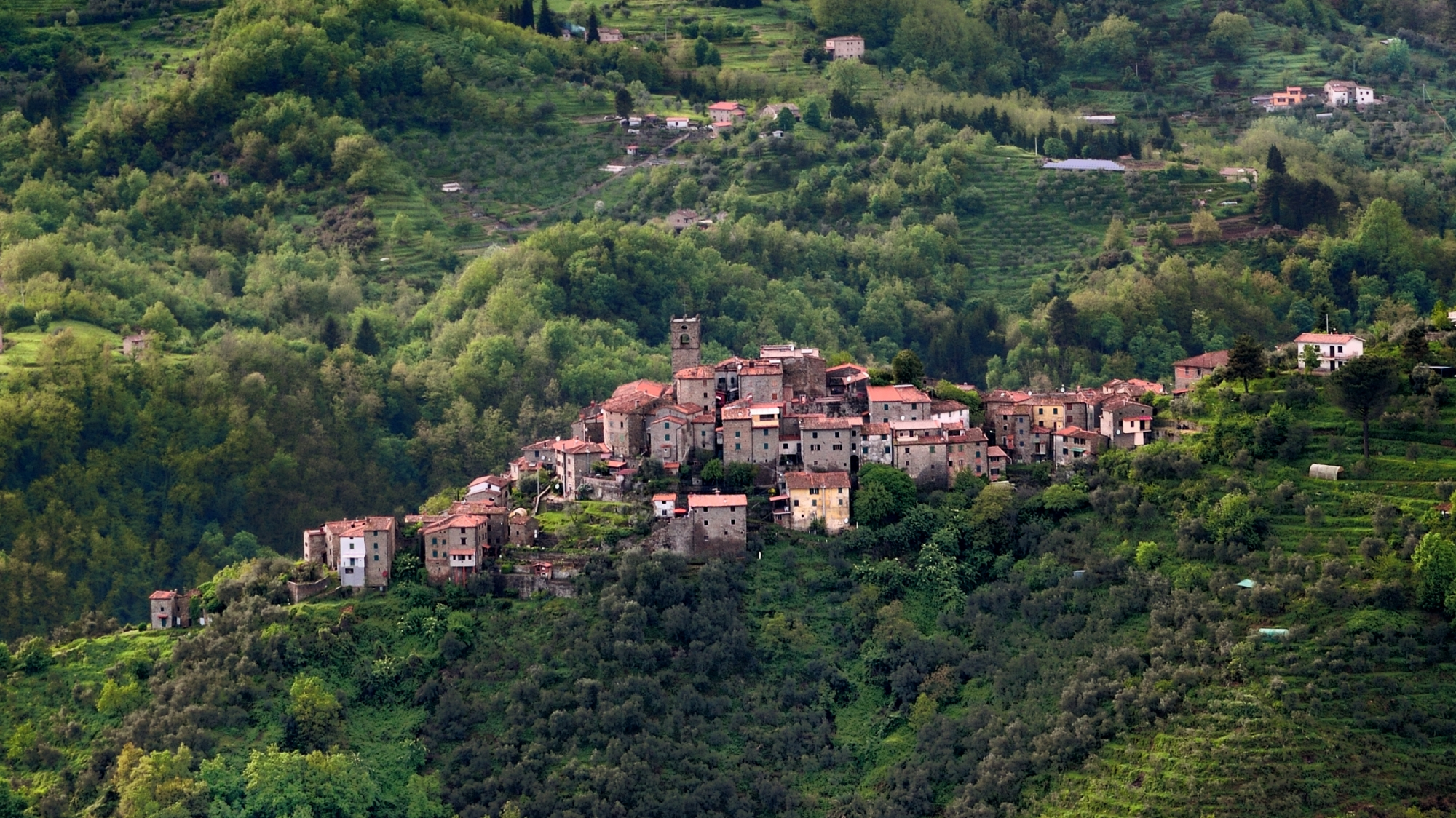
- Sorana

- Location of Sorana in Italy
- Country: Italy
- Region: Tuscany
- Province: Pistoia
- Comune: Pescia
- Time zone: UTC+1 (CET)
  - Summer (DST): UTC+2 (CEST)

Sorana is a village (frazione) in the municipality of Pescia in the province of Pistoia in Tuscany, Italy. It lies along the Pescia River on the slope of Monte Petritulo in the foothills of the Apennine Mountains about twelve kilometers from Montecatini Terme. In 1994, it had 300 inhabitants. The area is known for its production of the Sorana bean.

Sorana is one of the Ten Castella in the local area known as the Valleriana and nicknamed Svizzera Pesciatina. The other castelle are Aramo, Castelvecchio, Fibbialla, Medicina, Pietrabuona, Pontito, San Quirico, Stiappa, and Vellano, plus an eleventh, Lignana, which is in ruins. The castella villages are built from pietra serena stone.

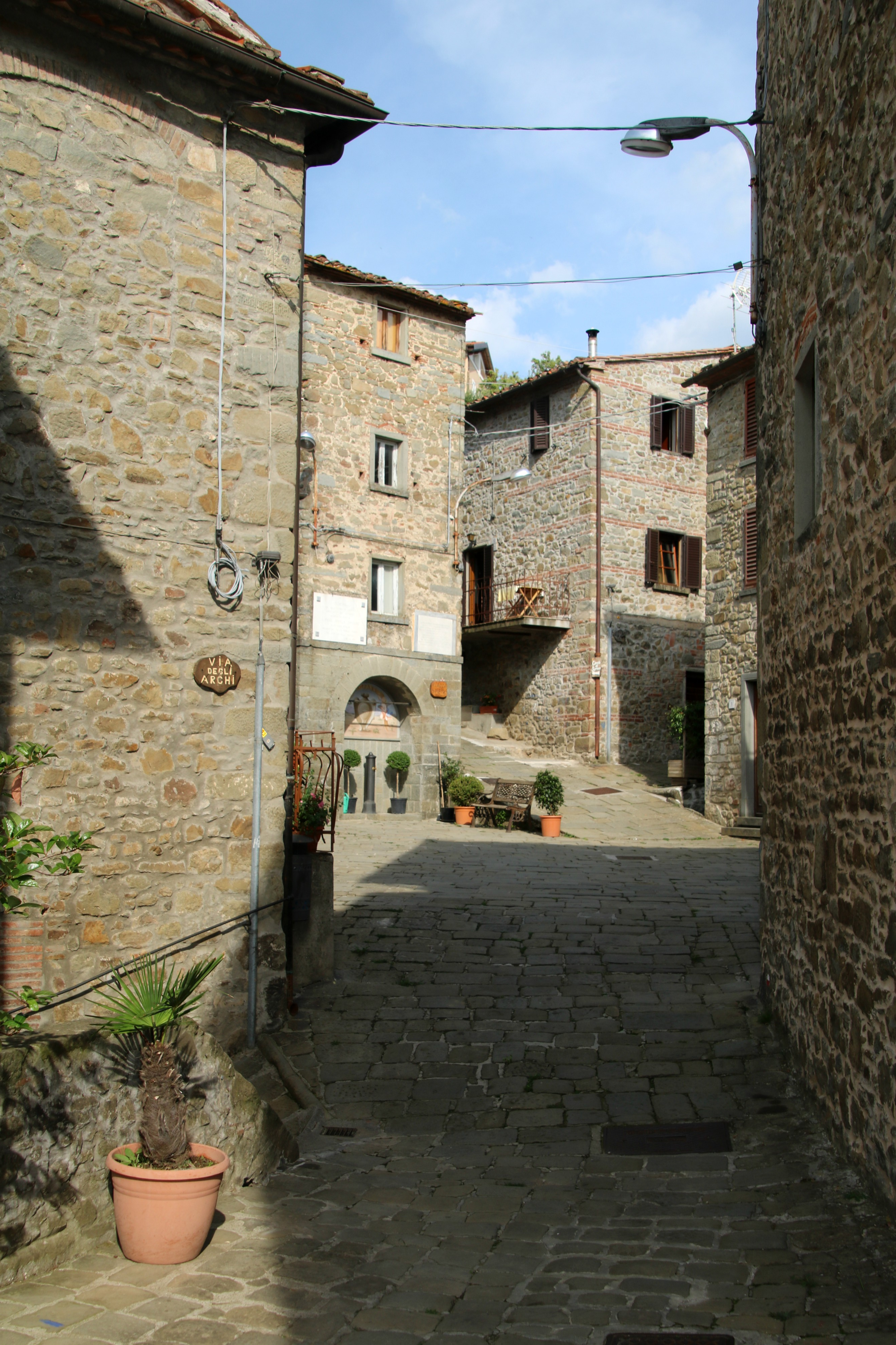

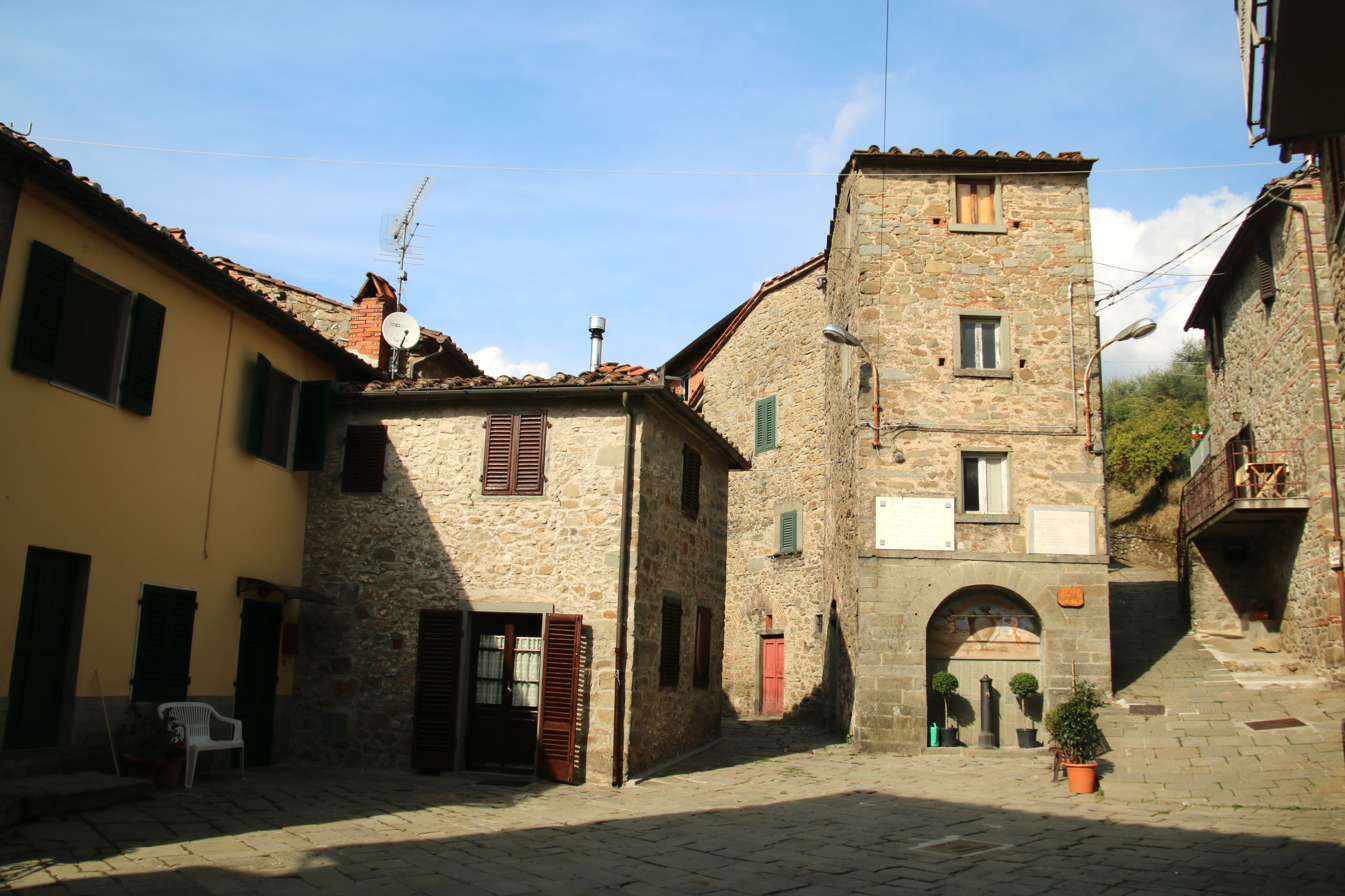

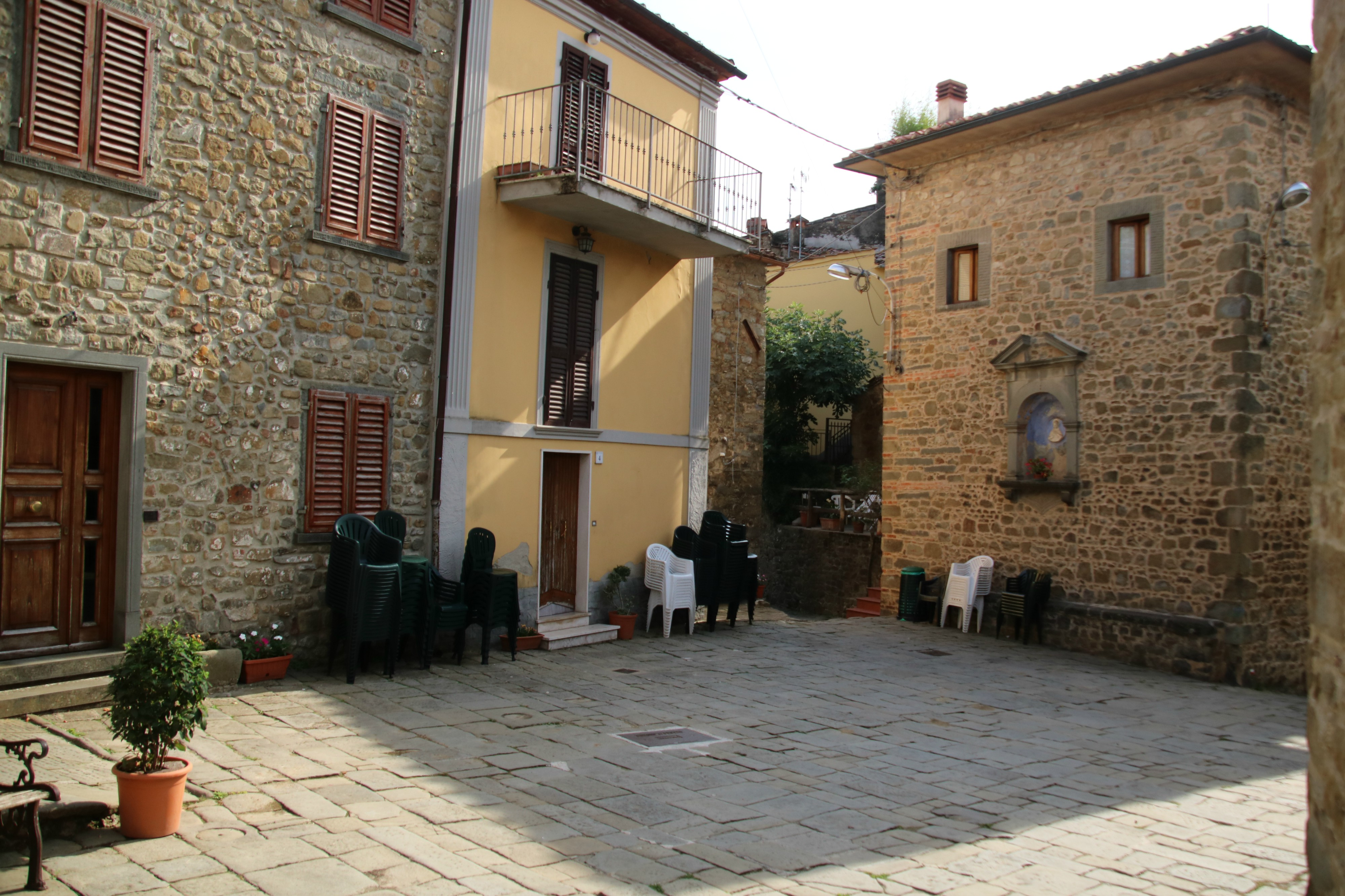

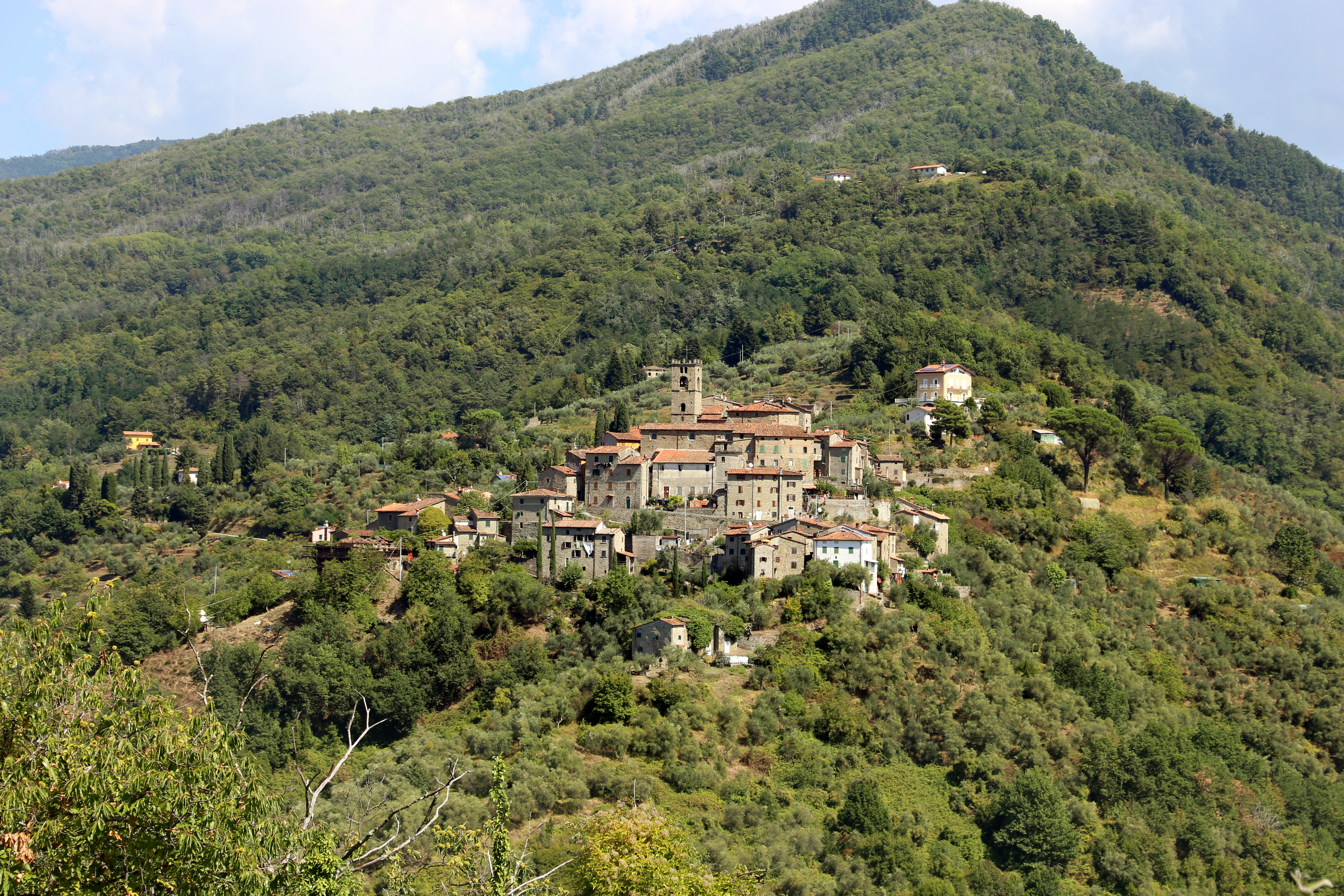

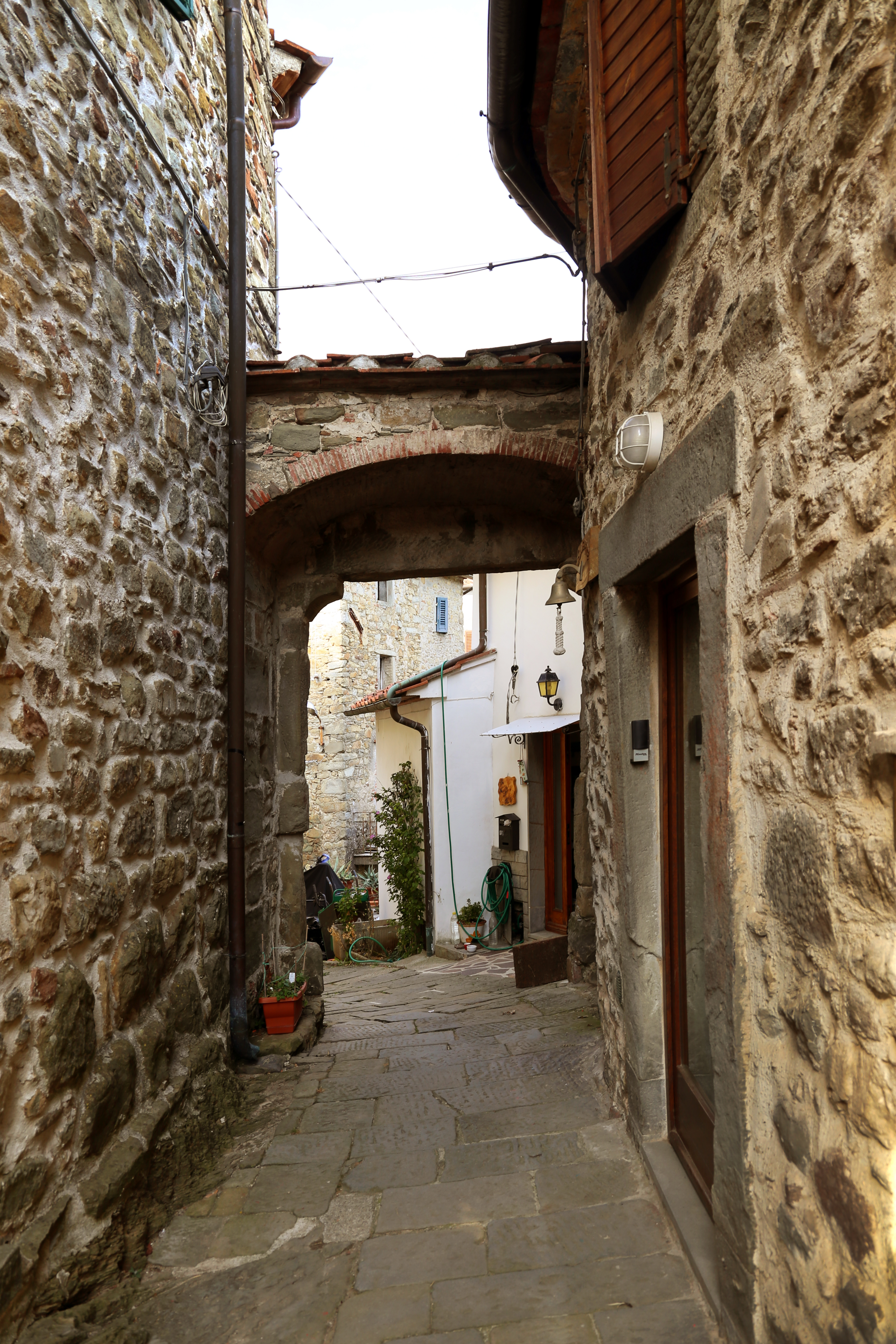

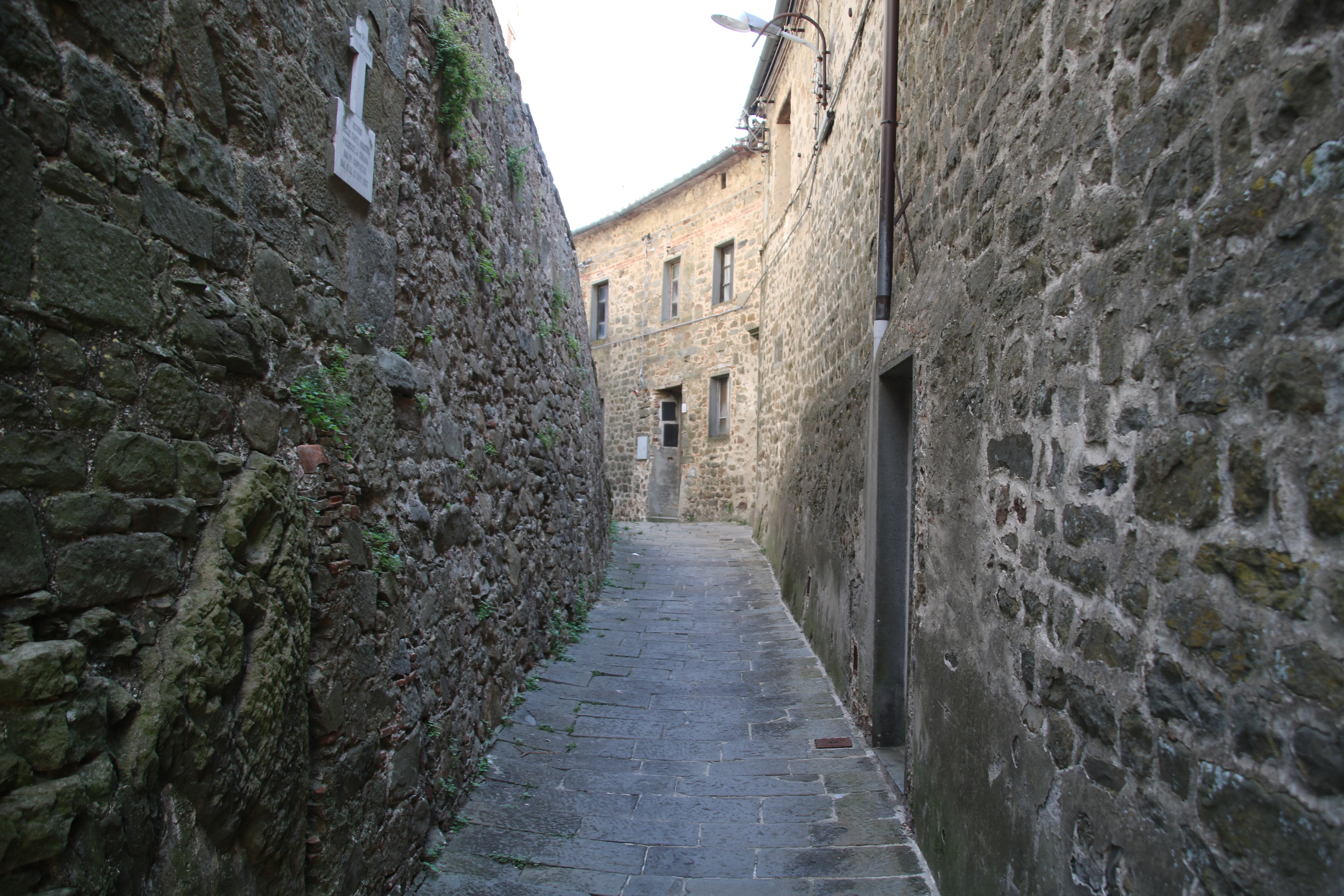
