= Pescia Cathedral =

Roman Catholic cathedral in Pescia, Tuscany, Italy

Coordinates: 43°54′03.50″N 10°41′32″E

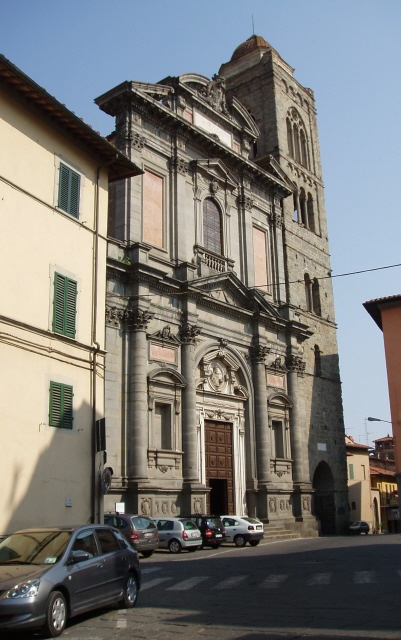
Pescia Cathedral

Pescia Cathedral (Italian: Duomo di Pescia; Cattedrale di Maria Santissima Assunta e di San Giovanni Battista) is a Roman Catholic cathedral in Pescia, Tuscany, Italy, dedicated to the Assumption of the Virgin Mary and to Saint John the Baptist.

It is the episcopal seat of the Diocese of Pescia.

== See also ==
Cathedral website
