= Pontito =

- Frazione
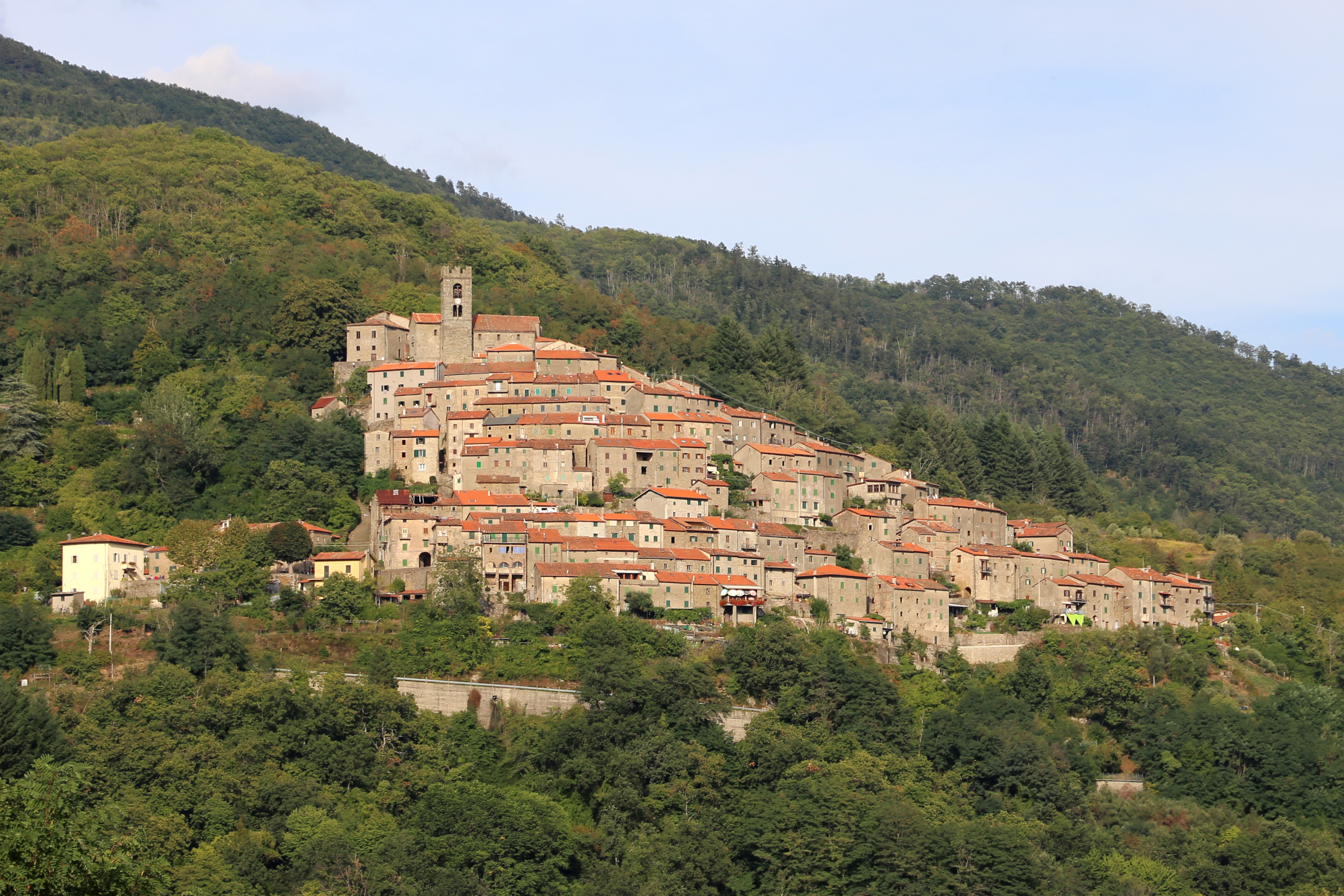

- Location of Pontito in Italy
- Coordinates: 43°59′51.5″N 10°43′22″E
- Country: Italy
- Region: Tuscany
- Province: Pistoia (PT)
- Comune: Pescia
- Elevation: 745 m (2,444 ft)

Population
  - Total: 47
- Time zone: UTC+1 (CET)
  - Summer (DST): UTC+2 (CEST)
- Postal code: 51010
- Dialing code: (+39) 0572

Pontito is administratively a frazione of the comune of Pescia, in the Province of Pistoia, Tuscany.

== Location and description ==
It is one of the localities called Dieci castella (Ten castles) of the Valleriana area, otherwise called Svizzera Pesciatina ("Switzerland of Pescia"). It is located in the northernmost part of the Valleriana area. Pontito is an ancient village with its old stone houses in an almost total solitude, perched on a hill of 745 meters above sea level. The village is famous for is bell shape, obtained in accordance with the characteristics of the hill on which it has arisen. The bell shape widens as the altitude diminishes. In all likelihood the origins of the village are early medieval, making it one of the oldest and most iconic villages of the area.

== Etymology ==
According to tradition, the name should be traced to a bridge built here by the Roman emperor Titus. A more probable hypothesis binds the name of the village to a saint named Pontito. Another hypothesis is to derive the name from the village's characteristic pointed shape, defined as appuntito ("pointed"), which then became the current name of the village.

== Monuments and places of interest ==
- Church of Saints Andrea and Lucia

== Gallery of images ==
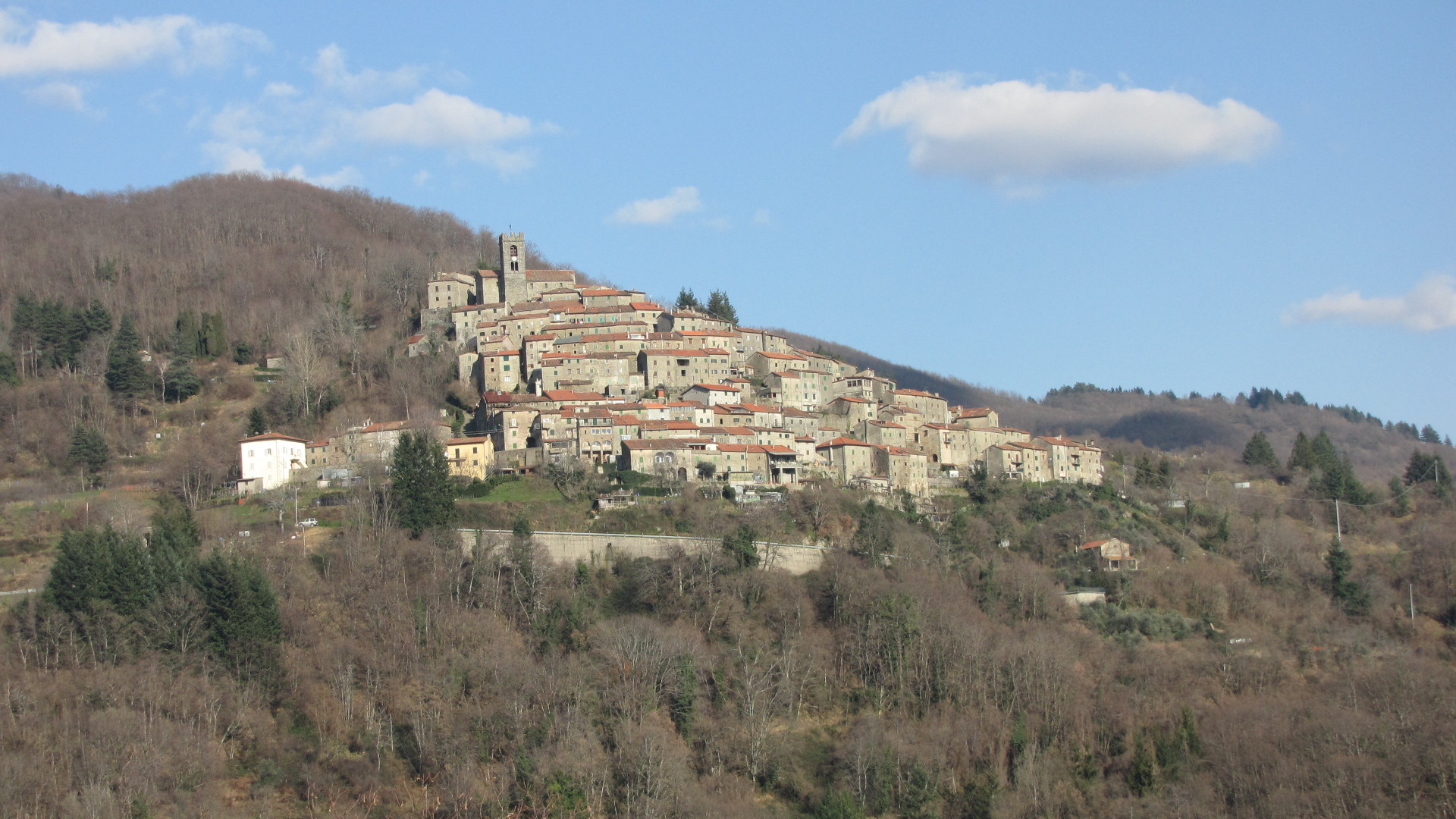
View of Pontito from the village of Stiappa

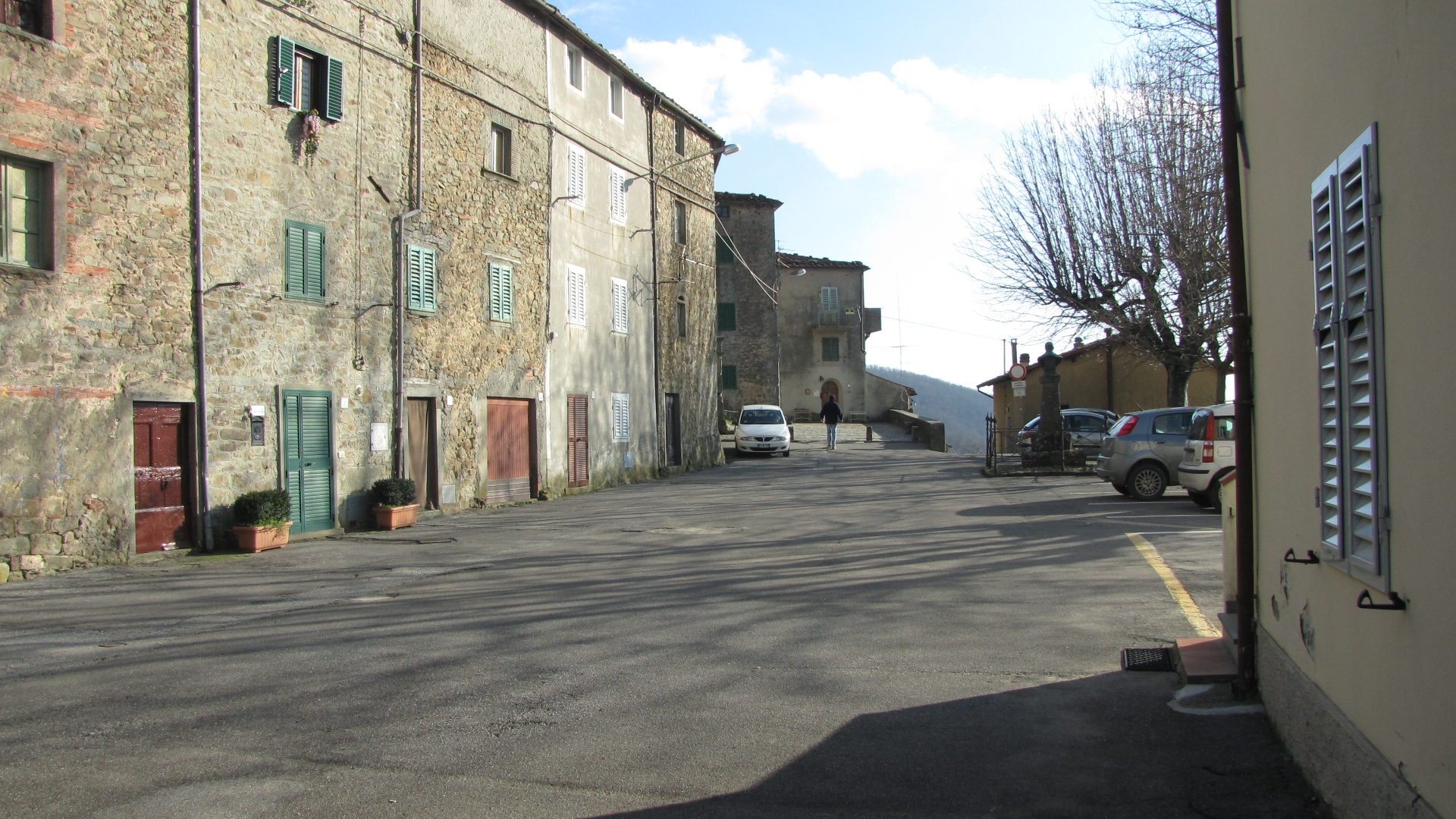
Piazza Lazzaro Papi, the main village square

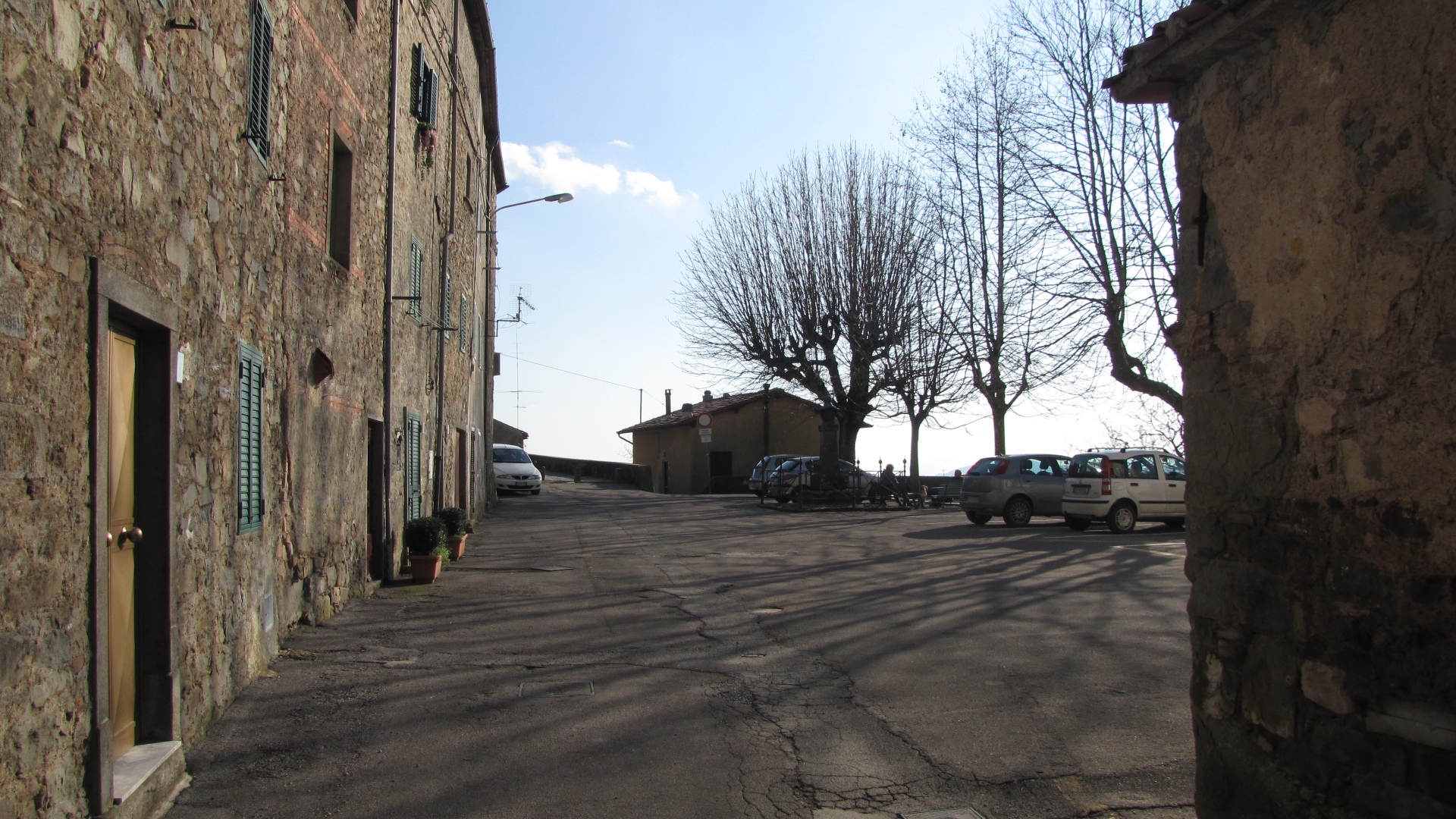
Piazza Lazzaro Papi

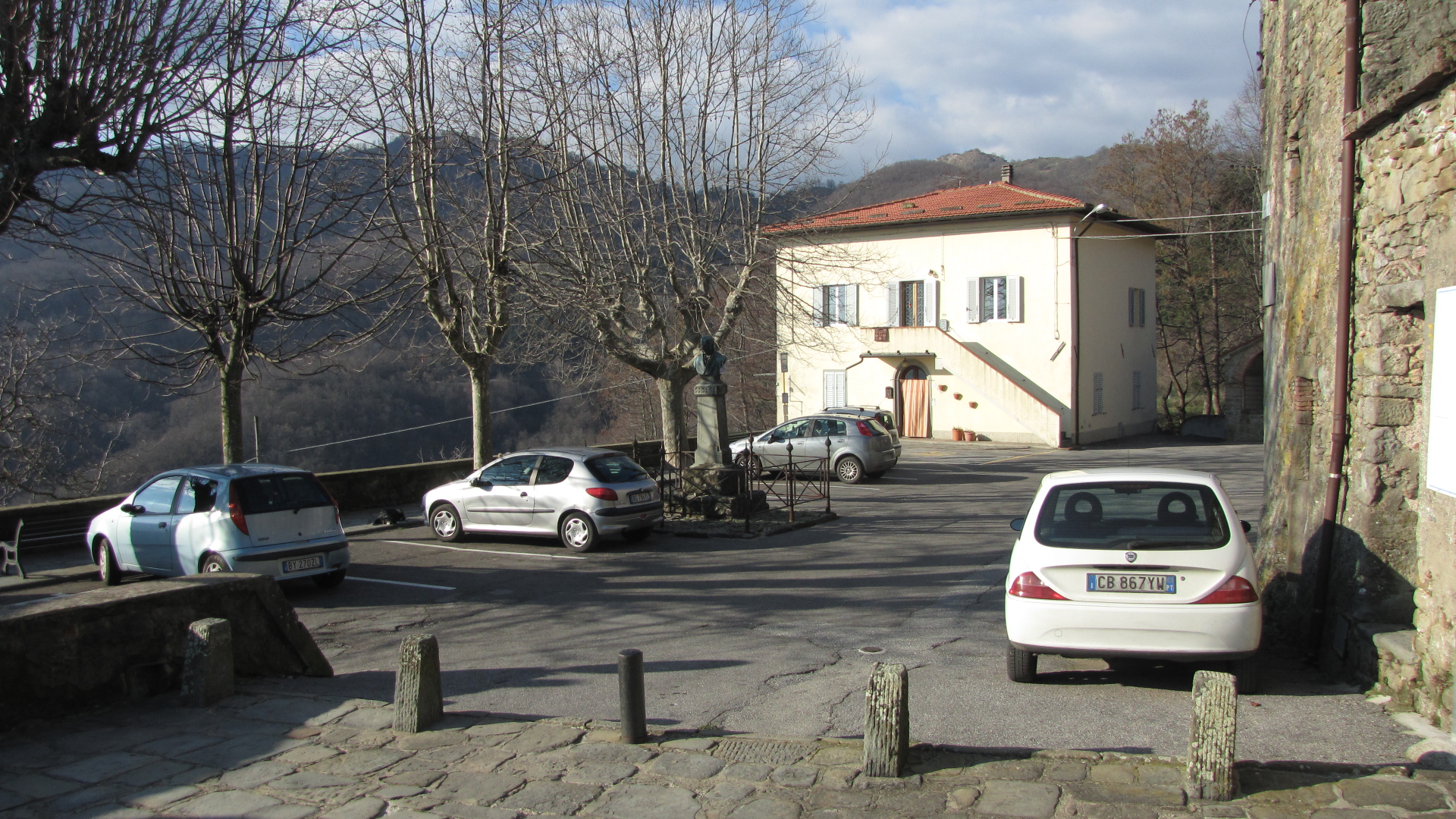
Piazza Lazzaro Papi

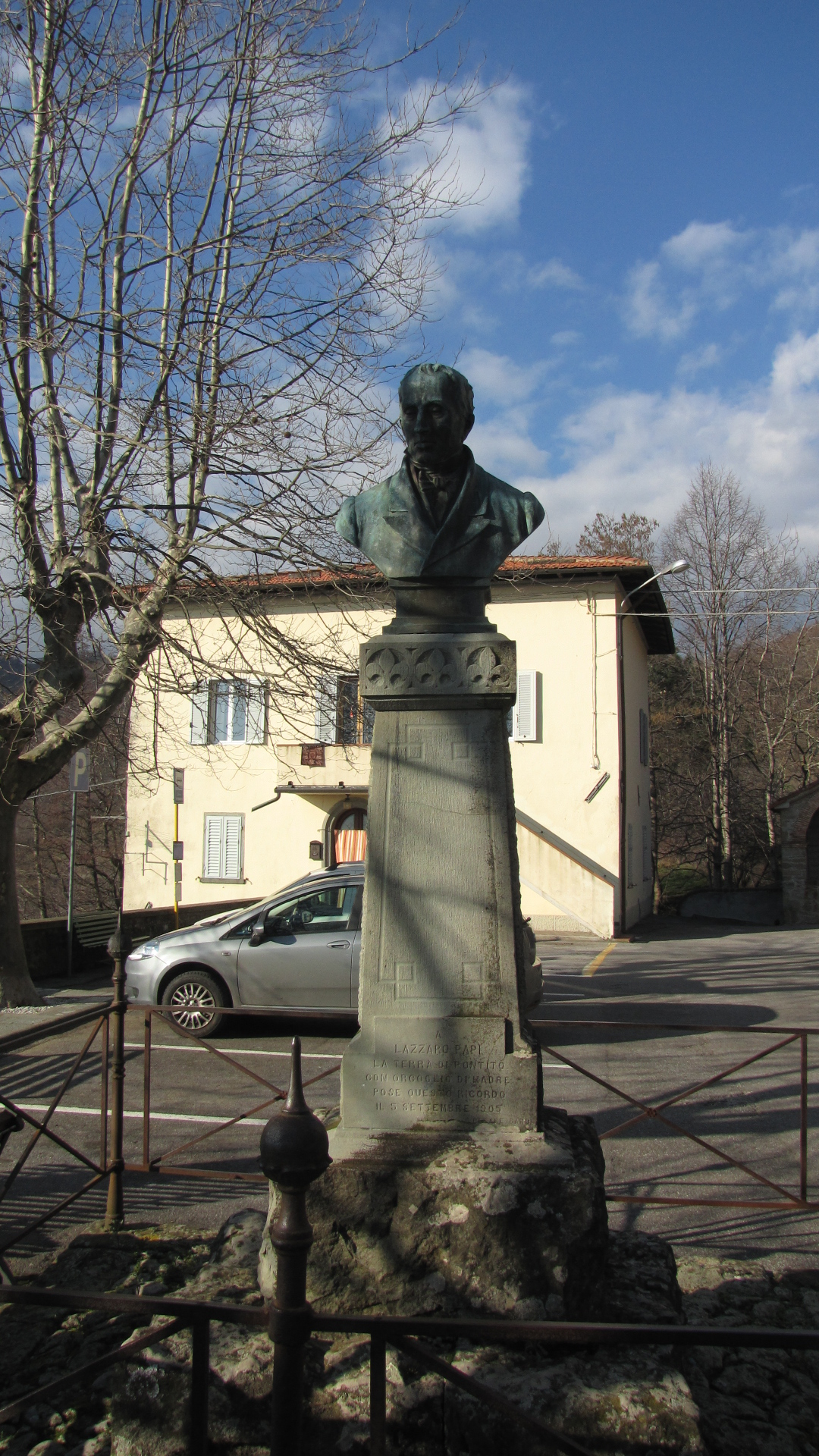
Monument to Lazzaro Papi

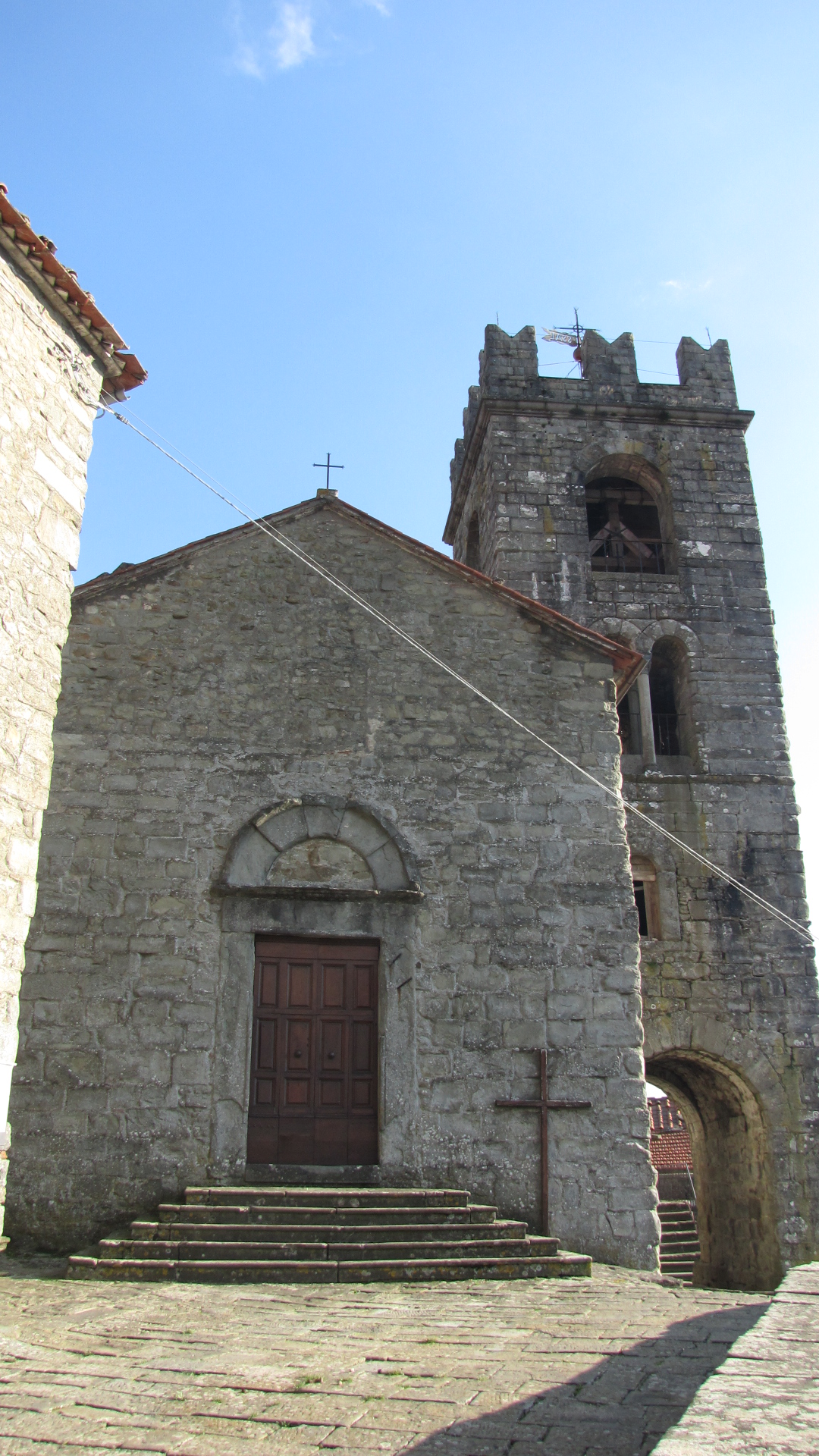
Chiesa dei Santi Lucia e Andrea (Church of Saints Andrea and Lucia)

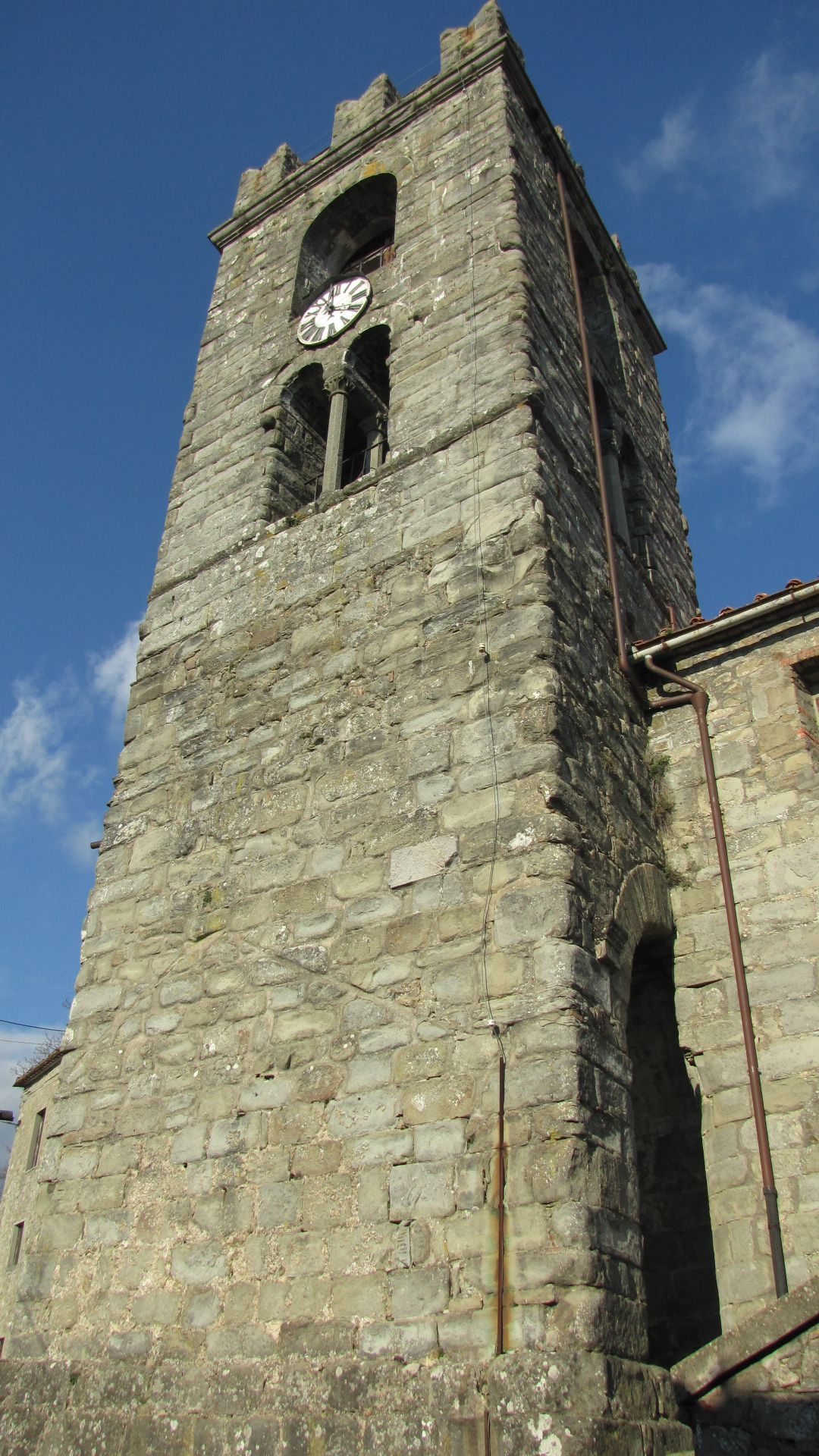
Il campanile (the bell tower), formerly a medieval defense tower

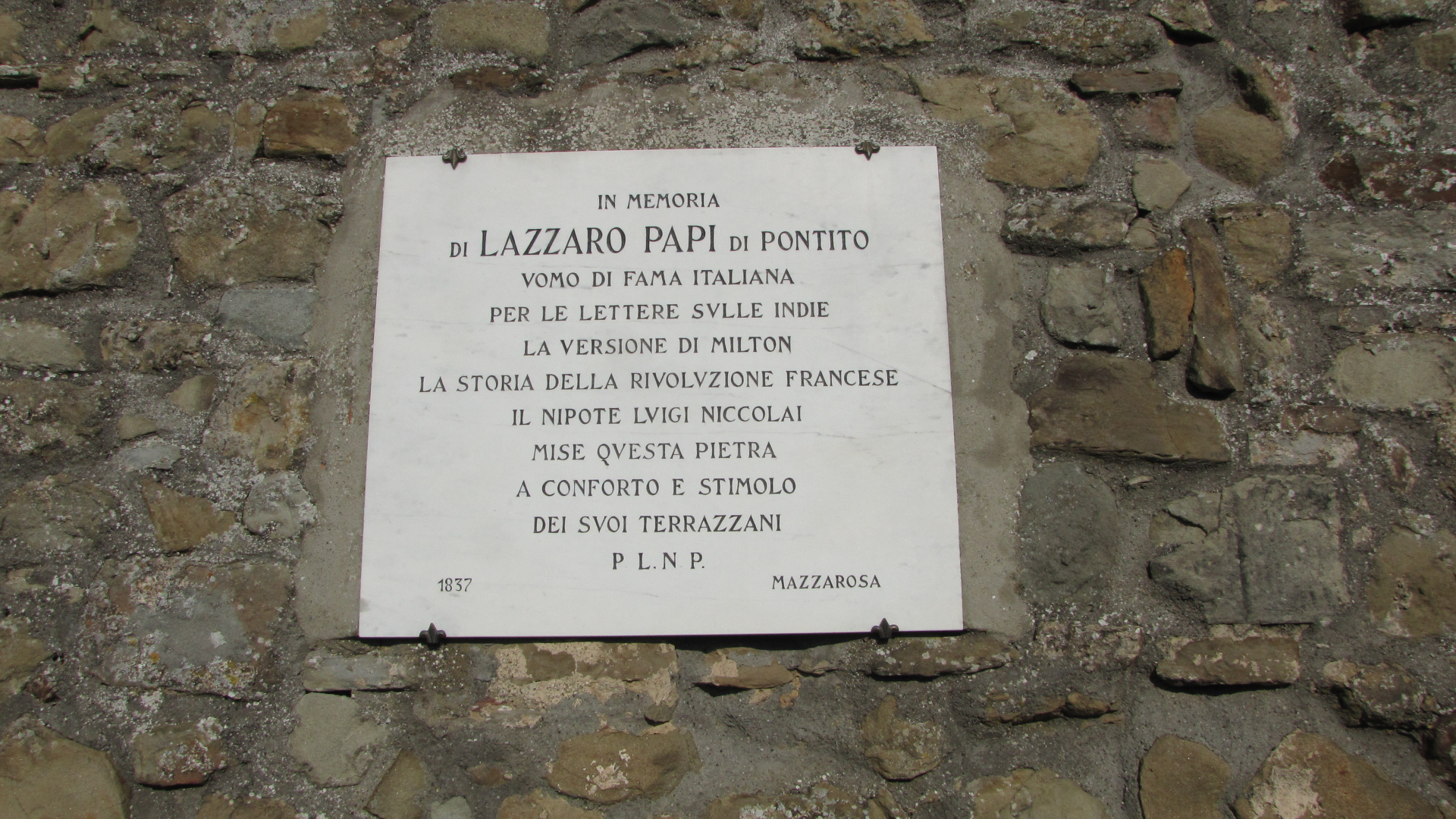
Plaque dedicated to Lazzaro Papi

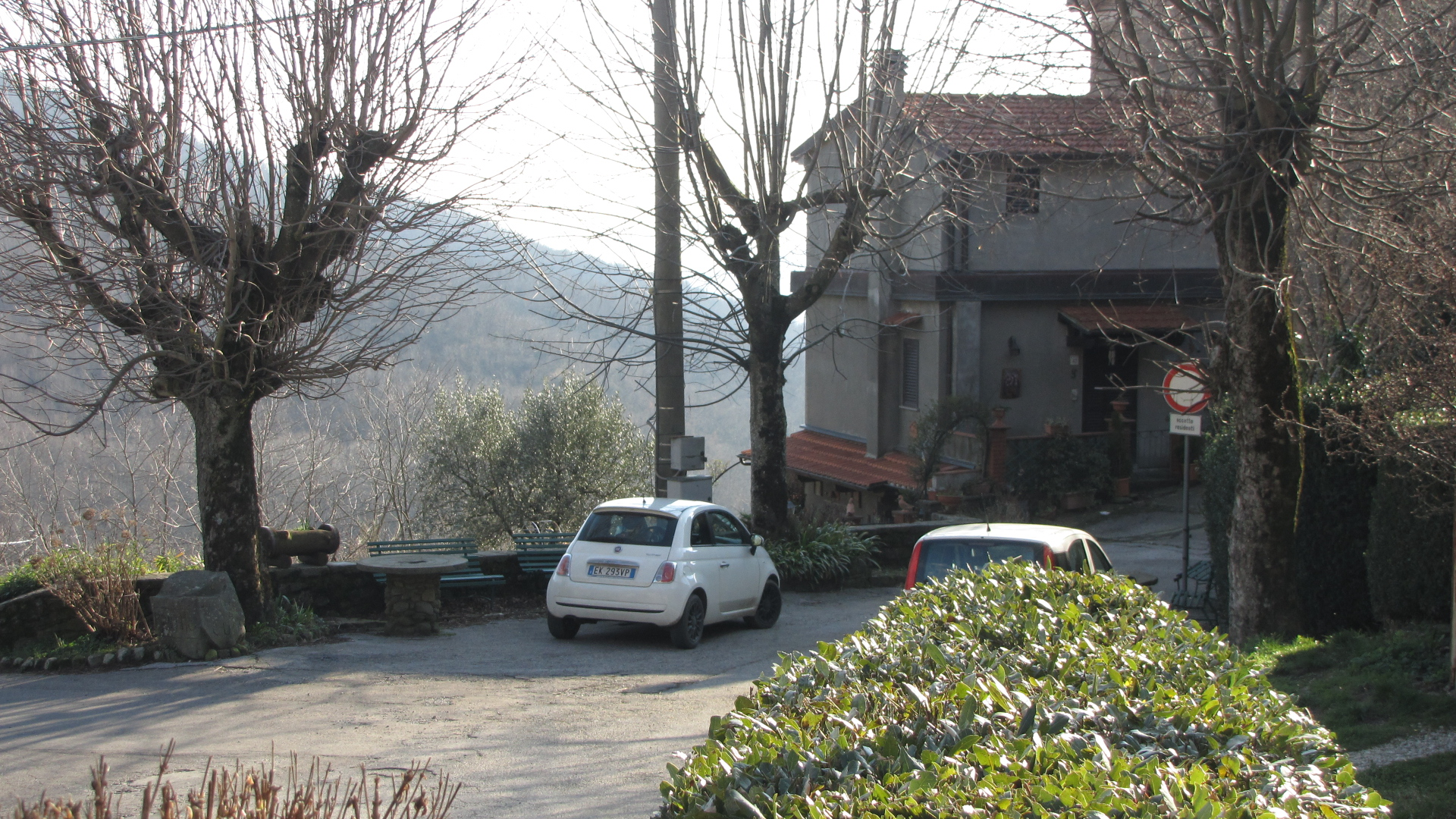
Piazzetta called "Porta a Luca"

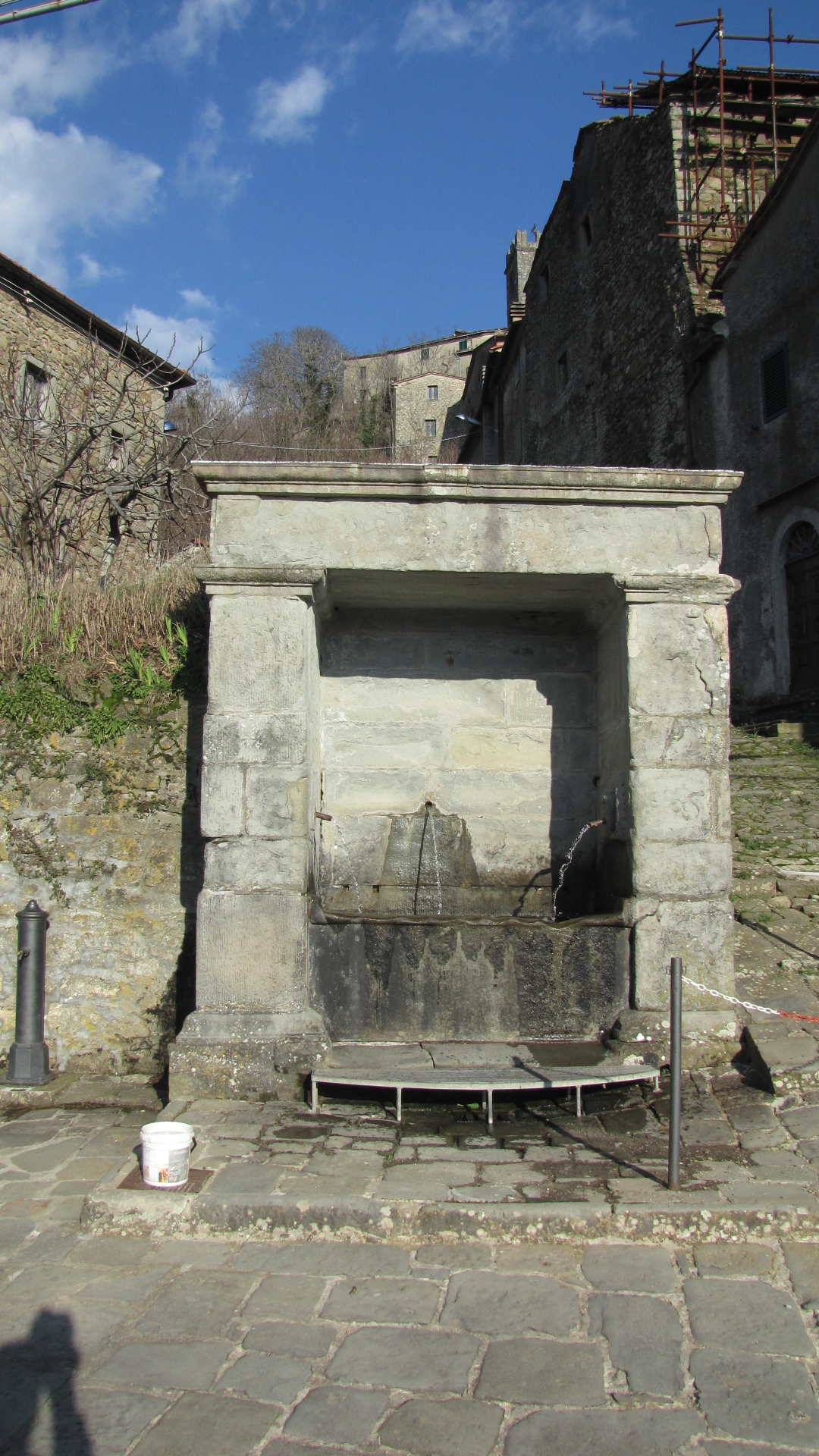
The village's main fountain, called "il Pillion" (the Pill).

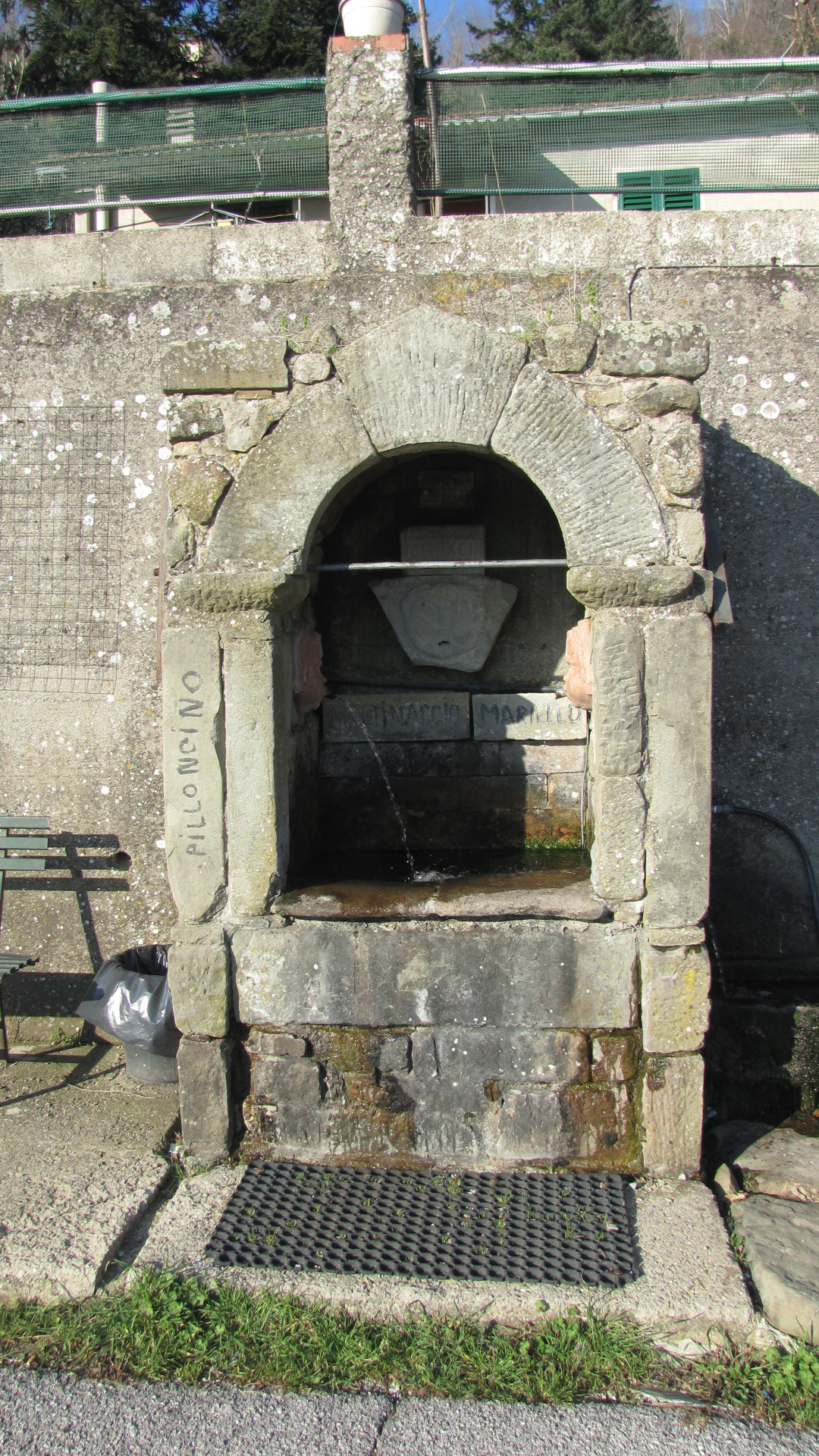
The village's lesser fountain, called "il Pilloncino"

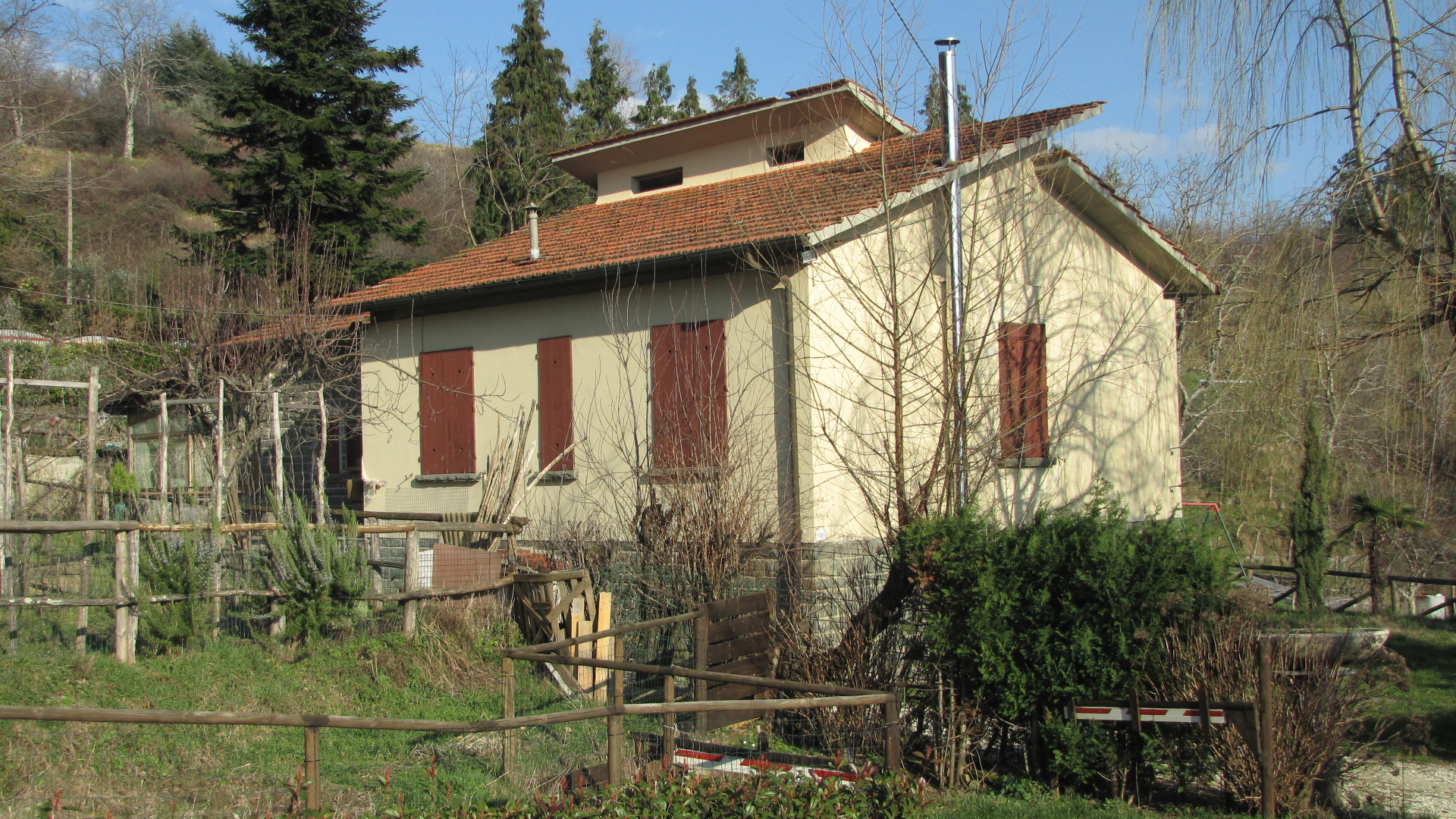
Building of the former elementary school, now reconverted into a house
