= Valdinievole =

Area in Tuscany, Italy

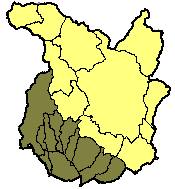
The 11 Comuni of Valdinievole shown in brown within the province of Pistoia

Valdinievole or Val di Nievole (Italian pronunciation: [ˌvaldiˈnjɛːvole]; "Valley of the Nievole (River)") is an area in the south-western part of the province of Pistoia, Tuscany, Italy.

== Geography ==
The area is made up of 11 comuni: Buggiano, Chiesina Uzzanese, Larciano, Lamporecchio, Massa e Cozzile, Monsummano Terme, Montecatini Terme, Pescia, Pieve a Nievole, Ponte Buggianese, and Uzzano, and has a population of almost 120,000. Parts of the comuni of Altopascio, Montecarlo, Marliana, and Serravalle Pistoiese are as well geographically part of the valley.

The main settlements are Montecatini and Monsummano, greatly developed in the last part of the 20th century, besides Pescia, the historical capital, which has the only hospital and is the Catholic Bishop's seat.

The name of the valley refers to the Nievole (Nièvole [ˈnjɛːvole], from Latin nebula, that means fog), a river that flows in the eastern part of the valley, whose main river is however the Pescia Maggiore or Pescia di Pescia which, as the Pescia Minore or di Collodi, flows in the western part of Valdinievole. All the streams and rivers of Valdinievole flow into the marsh of Fucecchio, the southern border between Valdinievole and the Arno valley in the province of Florence. On the northern and eastern sides of the valley there are hills, part of the lower Apennines and of the Montalbano.

== Notable people ==
- Allucio of Campigliano (1070–1134), a saint born to a wealthy, landed family in the Valdinievole and he ministered to the poor and travellers there.
