= Montalbano (mountain) =

Mountain range in Tuscany, Italy

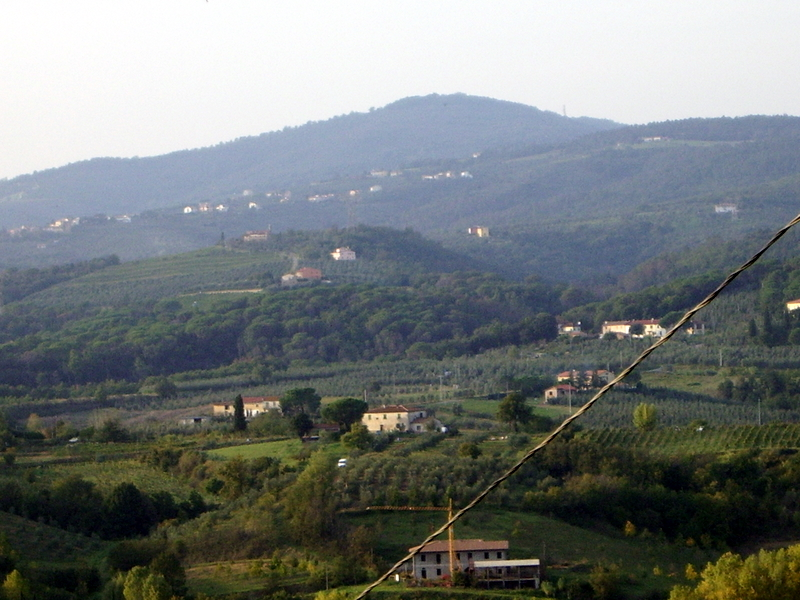
- Montalbano seen from Montelupo Fiorentino

Highest point
- Peak: Il Cupolino
- Elevation: 641 m (2,103 ft)

Dimensions
- Length: 25 km (16 mi)
- Width: 6.4 km (4.0 mi)
- Area: 160 km^{2} (62 mi^{2})

Geography
- Country: Italy
- Region: Tuscany
- Parent range: Apennines

Geology
- Rock type: Sandstone macigno

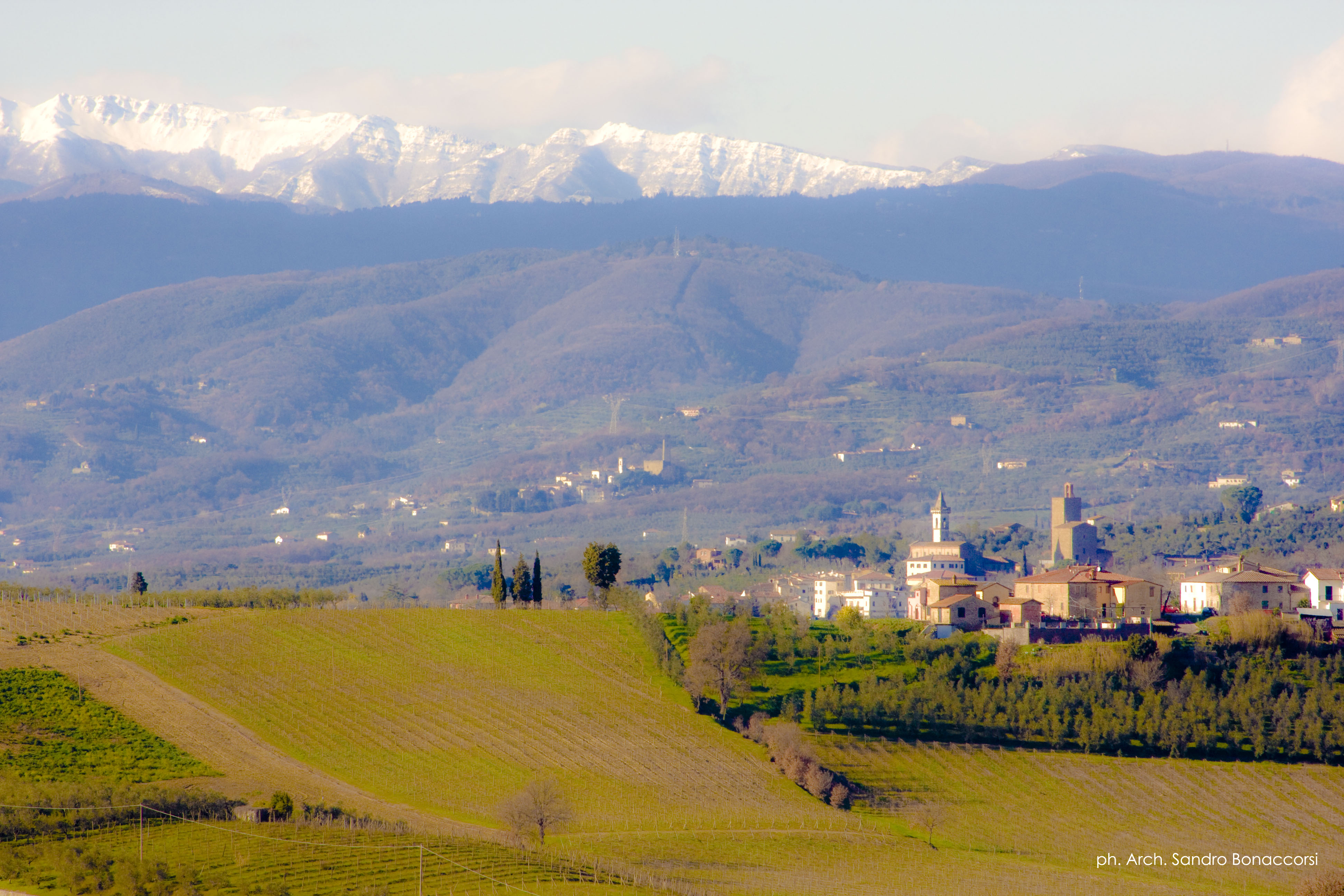

The Montalbano, or Monte Albano, is a mountain range that extends over 16,000 hectares across the provinces of Pistoia, Prato, and Florence, in the territories of the municipalities of Serravalle Pistoiese, Monsummano Terme, Larciano, Lastra a Signa, Lamporecchio, Quarrata, Carmignano, Poggio a Caiano, Signa, Montelupo Fiorentino, Capraia e Limite, Vinci, and Cerreto Guidi.

== Geography ==
The hilly and mountainous system separates the Upper Valdarno and the Florence-Prato-Pistoia plain from the Lower Valdarno and reaches an elevation of 641 a.s.l. with its highest peak, Il Cupolino. It detaches from the Apennines at the pass of Serravalle Pistoiese (182 m a.s.l.) and reaches the Arno at the narrow passage of the Gonfolina, where the river flows between two steep banks. The range is bounded on one side by the Arno basin (Lower Valdarno), which stretches from Lastra a Signa to Empoli, and on the other by the basin of its tributary Ombrone Pistoiese.

Montalbano is characterized by a system of adjacent hills, sloping gently down to the surrounding plains to the southwest and northeast. However, there are numerous steep depressions.

=== Climate and vegetation ===
The only weather station (excluding amateur ones) in the Montalbano area is located in Castelmartini, in the municipality of Larciano, although it is situated on the plain at just 23 m above sea level. Given the scarcity of climatological data series in the area, it is difficult to establish a reliable climatic profile for Montalbano itself. The general impression, supported by anthropogenic vegetation, is that the lower parts and southwest-facing slopes have a relatively Mediterranean climate, while the higher elevations and northeast-facing slopes have a submontane climate (a subtype of the temperate climate, according to the Köppen classification) with a dry summer period coinciding with peak temperatures and minimal precipitation. In the traditional phytoclimatic classification by Aldo Pavari, the mid-lower part of Montalbano falls within the Lauretum zone (medium-cold subzone), and the ridge within the Castanetum zone (warm subzone). More recent climatological and bioclimatological sources do not agree on a precise classification, partly because the area lies in a transitional zone between the Central European domain (horizon of deciduous trees) and the Mediterranean domain (horizon of evergreen sclerophylls). According to Bagnouls and Gaussen, it falls within the attenuated mesomediterranean bioclimate, while for Salvador Rivas Martínez, it is in the sub-Mediterranean temperate oceanic bioclimate

== History ==
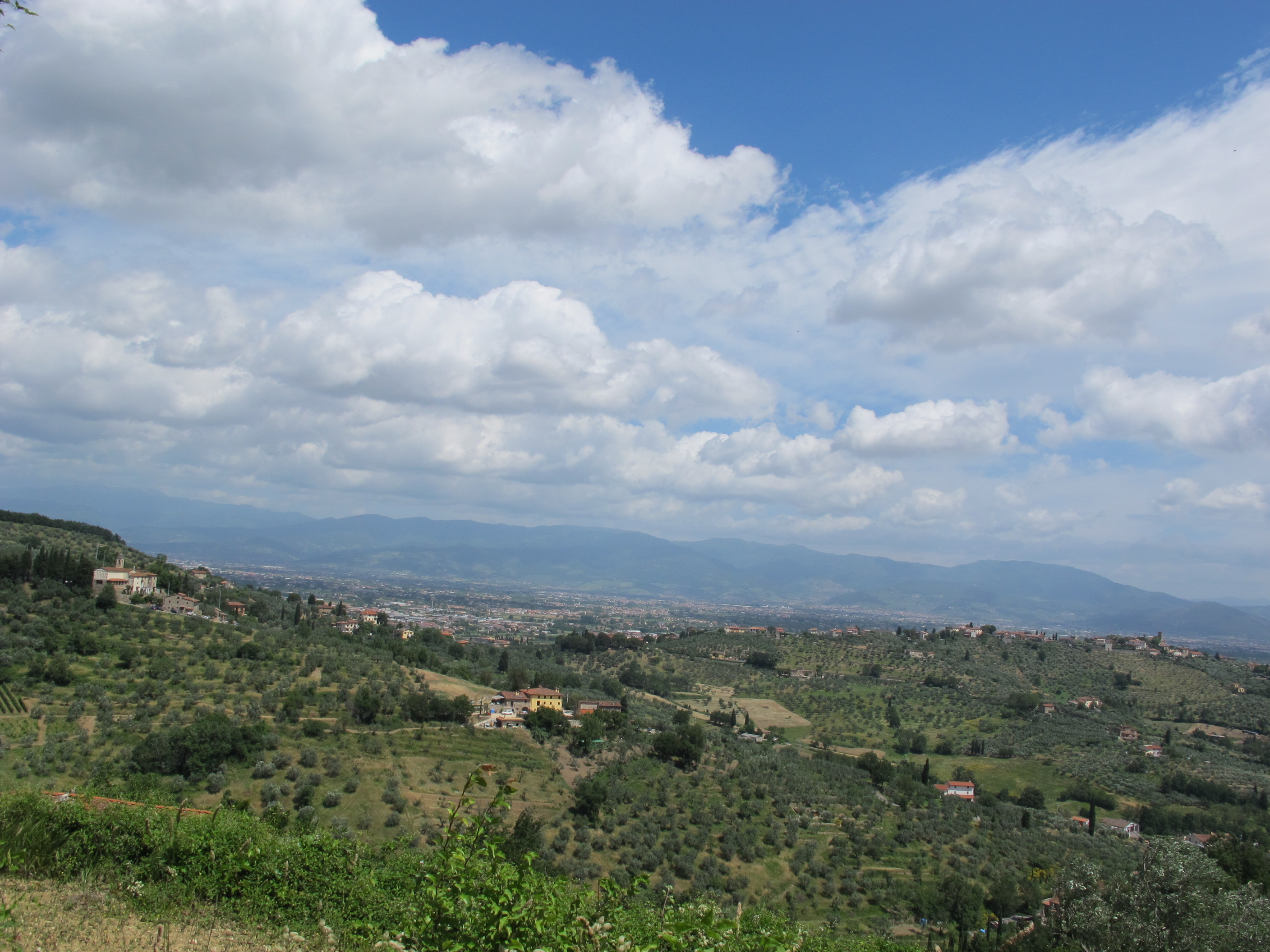
View from Montalbano toward Quarrata

The particular position between Pistoia, Prato, and Florence, and the environmental characteristics between plain and hill, played a decisive role in the historical evolution of the area, especially in the 13th century. The area, since the early Middle Ages, was almost entirely part of the Pistoia countryside and was equipped with an extensive system of castles and fortifications, not all of which have survived. The Pistoia defensive system indeed pivoted on Montalbano with the castles of Serravalle, Monsummano Alto, Montevettolini, Larciano, Cecina, Lamporecchio, Vinci, Tizzana, Carmignano, Artimino, and Capraia. Between the 13th and 14th century, the entire Montalbano territory was a battleground between Florence, Pistoia, and Lucca and the scene of the exploits of Castruccio Castracani, until Florence’s complete dominance.

Characteristic of the medieval period are the village of Artimino, the castle of Larciano, and numerous parish churches and chapels scattered in the countryside, including the Pieve di Santa Maria e di San Leonardo near Artimino, the Abbey of San Martino in Campo, the Church of San Giusto al Pinone, and the Church of San Baronto.

== Productions ==
Numerous historic farms in the area currently produce olive oil and wine. The Montalbano area is suited for the production of red wines, including the Chianti Montalbano. In particular, its extra virgin olive oil can be designated IGP Toscano menzione Montalbano in compliance with the geographical area and quality parameters set by the regulations of the Consortium for the Protection of Tuscan Extra Virgin Olive Oil IGP. The production area for olives destined for the production of extra virgin olive oil with protected geographical indication “Toscano di Montalbano” includes, within the administrative territory of the Province of Pistoia, Province of Prato, and Florence, all or part of the olive-growing territories within the administrative boundaries of the municipalities of: Capraia e Limite, Carmignano, Cerreto Guidi, Fucecchio, Lamporecchio, Larciano, Monsummano Terme, Poggio a Caiano, Pistoia, Quarrata, Serravalle Pistoiese, and Vinci.

Specifically, this area is delimited as follows: From a line starting at a point to the north on the Torrente Stella, in the locality of Stazione di Masotti in the municipality of Serravalle Pistoiese, it proceeds southeast to the confluence of the Torrente Ombrone in the locality of Poggetto, in the municipality of Poggio a Caiano; it then follows the same Torrente Ombrone until its confluence with the Arno river. The line continues west along the Arno river from the Carmignano railway station to the locality of San Pierino in the municipality of Fucecchio; it then proceeds north along the municipal road to Massarella until the Canale Maestro in the locality of Ponte del Burelle, then continues north along the same Canale Maestro until its confluence with the Nievole river in the locality of Porto dell’Uggia. From here, it continues north along the same Nievole river to the locality of Ponte di Serravalle. It then continues northeast along state road No. 435 until it rejoins the Torrente Stella in the locality of Masotti, the point where the delimitation began.

== See also ==
- Carmignano
- Poggio a Caiano
- Quarrata
- Valdinievole

== Bibliography ==
- Antonio Arrighi; Adelaide Bertogna; Stefano Naef, eds. (1993). Montalbano [Montalbano: Geology, Flora, Fauna, History] (in Italian). Vol. Geologia, flora, fauna, storia. Padova: Tamari. ISBN 88-8043-006-8.
- Gestri, Giovanni; Peruzzi, Lorenzo (2013). I fiori di Leonardo. La flora vascolare del Montalbano in Toscana [Leonardo’s Flowers: The Vascular Flora of Montalbano in Tuscany] (in Italian). Roma: Aracne editrice. ISBN 978-88-548-5920-3.
- Istituto Regionale per la Programmazione Economica della Toscana, ed. (1981). Immagini da ventisette secoli: schedatura esemplificativa dei beni culturali del Montalbano [Images from Twenty-Seven Centuries: Exemplary Cataloging of Montalbano’s Cultural Heritage] (in Italian). Pistoia: Consorzio interprovinciale per il Montalbano.
- Repetti, Emanuele (1833–1846). Dizionario geografico fisico storico della Toscana [Geographical, Physical, and Historical Dictionary of Tuscany] (in Italian). Firenze. OCLC 671858704.
