= Rinaldo Vanni =

Italian politician

President of the Province of Pistoia
- In office 20 July 2015 – 26 February 2019
- Preceded by: Federica Fratoni
- Succeeded by: Luca Marmo

Mayor of Monsummano Terme
- In office 8 June 2009 – 11 June 2019
- Preceded by: Giuliano Calvetti
- Succeeded by: Simona De Caro

Personal details
- Born: 13 December 1959 (age 66) Ponte Buggianese, Province of Pistoia, Italy
- Party: Democratic Party
- Occupation: Public administrator

Rinaldo Vanni is an Italian politician of the Democratic Party who served as president of the Province of Pistoia from 2015 to 2019 and as mayor of Monsummano Terme from 2009 to 2019.

== Life and career ==
Vanni obtained a diploma as a surveyor from the Istituto Tecnico "Enrico Fermi" in Pistoia in 1979. After an initial period working in a professional technical office, he entered public service in 1982 and remained a public employee until April 2009.

Active in politics since the late 1980s, he later became a local official of the Democratic Party. Vanni was elected mayor of Monsummano Terme in June 2009 and was re-elected in 2014.

In October 2014, he was elected to the Provincial Council of Pistoia. Following the resignation of president Federica Fratoni, Vanni became acting president of the province on 20 April 2015. He was subsequently elected president of the Province of Pistoia in July 2015. He resigned from office on 26 February 2019.
