= Aldo Morelli =

Italian politician (1950–2025)

President of the Province of Pistoia
- In office 26 July 1990 – 14 June 1999
- Preceded by: Riccardo Rastelli
- Succeeded by: Gianfranco Venturi

Member of the Regional Council of Tuscany
- In office 26 March 2013 – 17 June 2015

Personal details
- Born: 28 February 1950 Lamporecchio, Italy
- Died: 7 October 2025 (aged 75) Lamporecchio, Province of Pistoia, Italy
- Party: PCI (until 1991); PDS (1991–1998); DS (1998–2007); PD (2007–2025)

Aldo Morelli (28 February 1950 – 7 October 2025) was an Italian politician. A member of the Italian Communist Party, the Democratic Party of the Left, and the Democrats of the Left, he served as president of the Province of Pistoia from 1990 to 1999. He also served as mayor of Lamporecchio (1999–2009) and member of the Regional Council of Tuscany (2013–2015).

Morelli died in Lamporecchio on 7 October 2025, at the age of 75.
