= Berlingozzo =

Italian ring-shaped cake

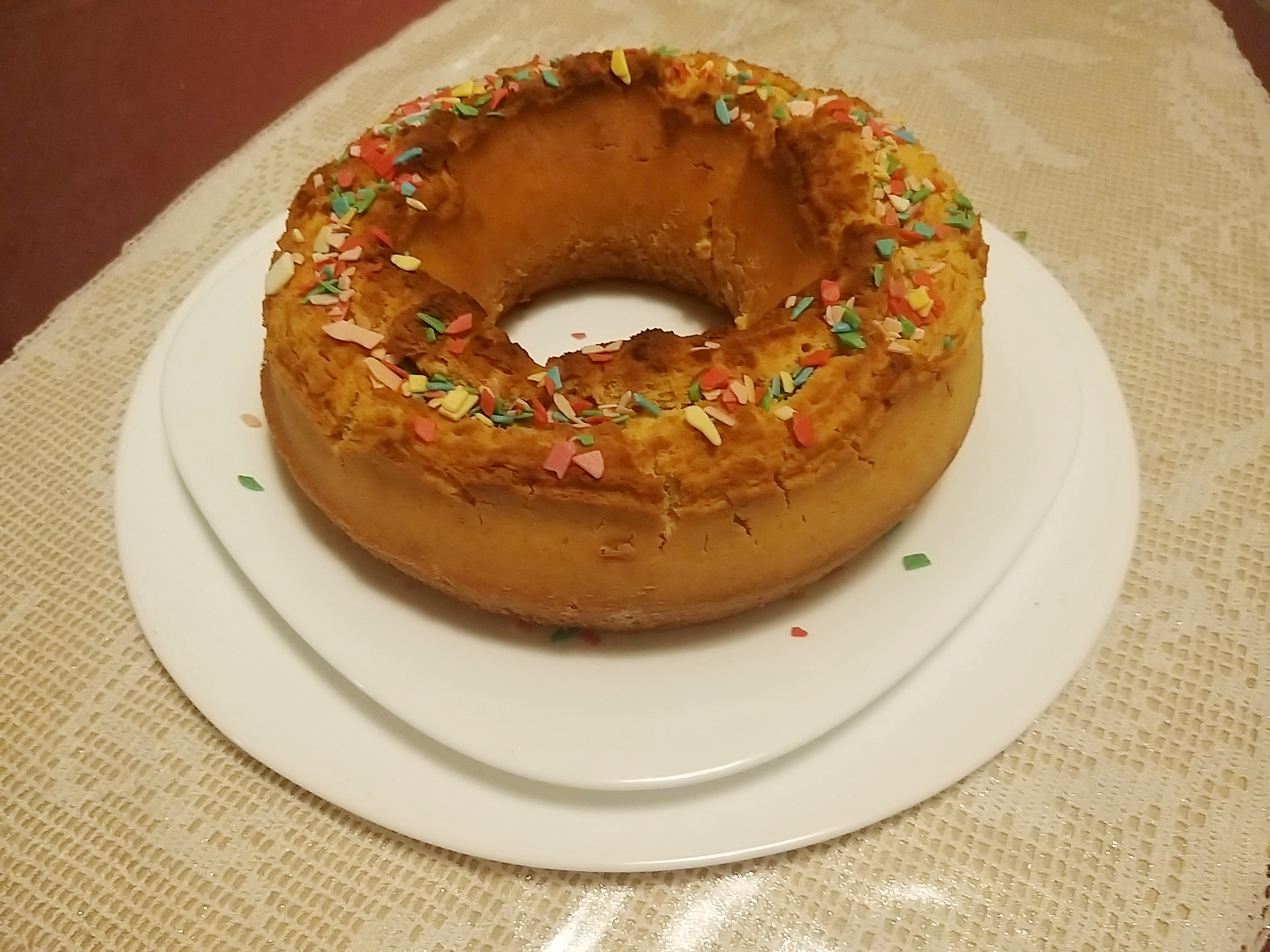
- Type: Cake
- Place of origin: Italy
- Region or state: Lamporecchio (province of Pistoia), Tuscany
- Main ingredients: Flour, sugar, butter, eggs, anise seeds

Berlingozzo is a typical Carnival cake of Lamporecchio, a comune (municipality) in the province of Pistoia, Italy. The name derives from berlingaccio, an Italian term that indicated Fat Thursday.

== See also ==
- List of Italian desserts and pastries
