= Larciano =

- Comune
- Comune di Larciano
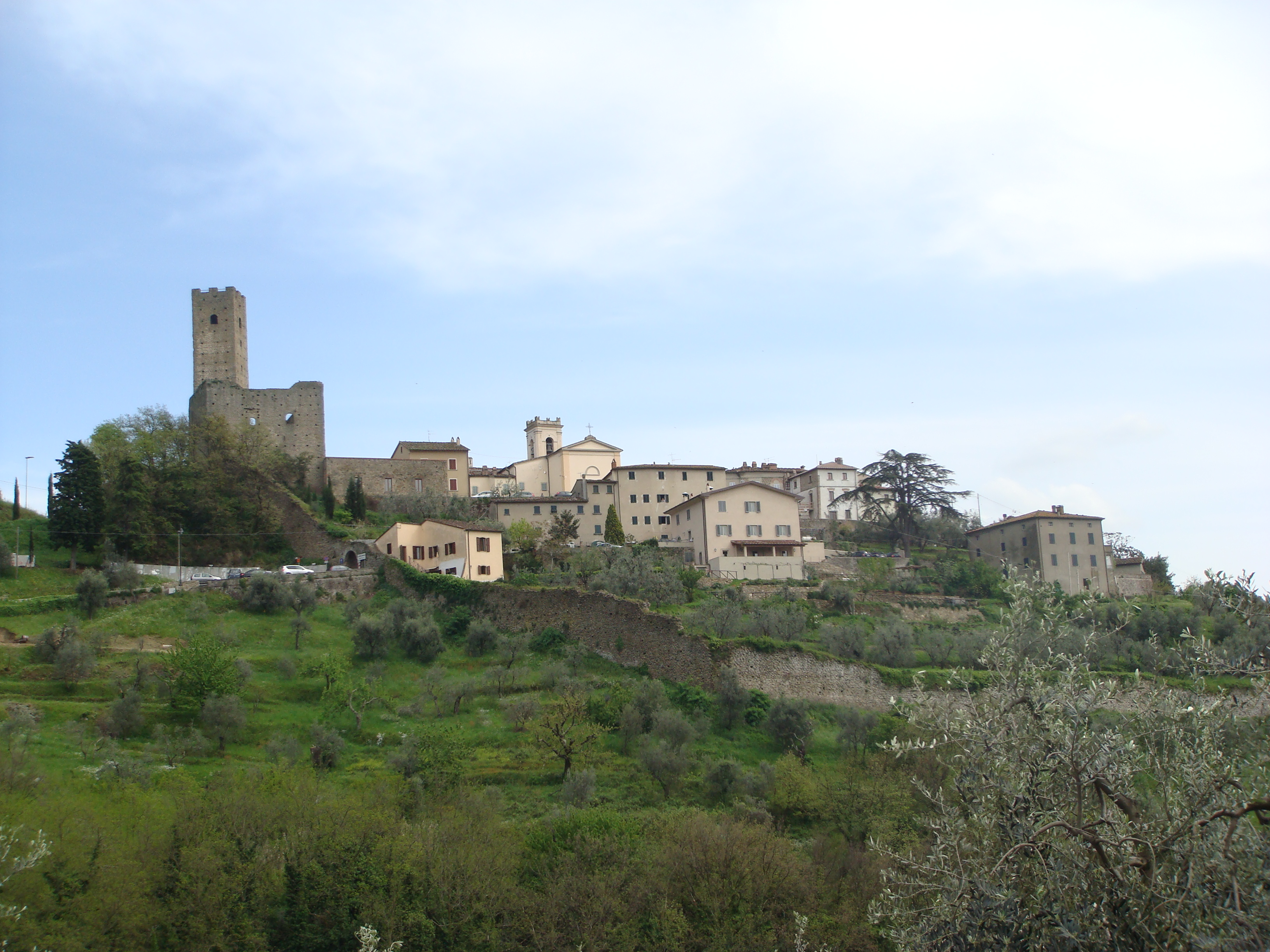
- View of Larciano

- Coat of arms

- Location within Italy Location within Tuscany
- Coordinates: 43°49′N 10°53′E
- Country: Italy
- Region: Tuscany
- Province: Pistoia (PT)
- Frazioni: Castelmartini, Cecina, Larciano Castello, San Rocco

Government
  - Mayor: Lisa Amidei

Area
  - Total: 24.97 km^{2} (9.64 sq mi)
- Elevation: 50 m (160 ft)

Population (31 August 2017)
  - Total: 6,319
  - Density: 253.1/km^{2} (655.4/sq mi)
- Demonym: Larcianesi
- Time zone: UTC+1 (CET)
  - Summer (DST): UTC+2 (CEST)
- Postal code: 51036
- Dialing code: 0573
- Website: Official website

Larciano is a comune (municipality) in the Province of Pistoia in the Italian region of Tuscany. The town hall is located in San Rocco.

Larciano is about 50 kilometers west of Florence and about 15 kilometers south of Pistoia.

Larciano borders the following municipalities: Cerreto Guidi (FI), Fucecchio (FI), Lamporecchio (PT), Monsummano Terme (PT), Ponte Buggianese (PT), Serravalle Pistoiese (PT).

== Geography ==
=== Territory ===
Larciano is located in the Valdinievole area, on the Montalbano slopes and it borders the Fucecchio Marsh.

== History ==
The name of Larciano results from the latinization of the Etruscan name Larthial, which was the possessive genitive of the male name Larth. Larth is the proper name of an Etruscan fighter whose tomb, dating back to the year 340BCE, was discovered in 1870 in Tarquinia (a municipality in the Lazio region, Italy).

Another hypothesis focuses on a "praedium" (farm), possibly donated to a Roman soldier who had fought in the wars against the Ligurians. Italian words which end in "-ano" is typical of the Roman settlements which arose from a "praedium".

Finally, a third hypothesis, suggests that the toponym derives from "larch", since in the past the area was rich in larch woods.

In 941 the toponym was presented as Arsianus.

The history of Larciano is based on the history of the area named nowadays Larciano Castello.

By the middle of the tenth century, Larciano belonged to the Guidi family thanks to a donation that Ranieri and Guido, Count Tegrimo's sons, made to the cathedral and to the bishop of Pistoia. Later, the castle situated in Larciano was confirmed to the Guidis by Arrigo VI and Federico II.

In 1225 the sons of Guido Guerra, who was the count of Modigliana (a municipality in Emilia-Romagna), sold Larciano, along with Cecina, Casi and Collecchio, to the municipality of Pistoia for 6,000 lire. Due to its position, Larciano became one of the cornerstones of the defensive system of Pistoia in the so-called “low part of the mountains”. In fact, this denomination used to be referred to the western slope of the Montalbano area: this explains the decision of the city to strengthen its walls and other defense works.

In 1302, during the war between the Ghibellines coming from Pistoia against the Guelphs from Florence and Lucca, Larciano was conquered immediately after the surrender of Serravalle. However, in 1310 the town was reconquered together with other territories lost by Pistoia, upon the payment of 10,000 gold florins. Around the year 1391, the castle became a solid base organized by Pistoia and Florence, with the same purpose of protecting themselves by the danger of a possible offensive in Tuscany by Gian Galeazzo Visconti.

In 1401 Florence took possession of Larciano and the whole countryside; consequently Larciano became the seat of one of the four Podestà’s seat in which the territory around Pistoia was organized. Among the Podestà, the most famous was Francesco Ferrucci. Subsequently, Larciano and Serravalle were put together in the same Podestà for the will of the Medici family. In 1772 Serravalle became the sole seat of the Podestà’s seat, while in 1774 Larciano and Lamporecchio were gathered.

It was only on the 1st of July 1897 that Larciano obtained the separation from Lamporecchio and it became an independent municipality. It was composed of the hamlets of Biagiotti, Biccimurri, Castelmartini, Cecina, Larciano Castello and San Rocco, which still houses the Town Hall.

=== Honours ===
Italian gold medal bar

"During the last world conflict, this municipality of approximately five thousand two hundred inhabitants suffered one of the most brutal and atrocious retaliation by the Nazis troops, who slaughtered one hundred and seventy-five unarmed citizens, above all women, young people and children. Guided by a deep faith in a better, free and democratic country, the locals participated in the struggle against Nazi-fascism, giving a great example of exceptional self-denial, firmness and patriotism."

– 23 August 1944

== Monuments and places of interest ==
=== Religious buildings ===
- San Rocco Church
- Pieve of San Silvestro
- San Donnino Church
- San Niccolò Church

=== Civil buildings ===
- Villa Banchieri

=== Military buildings ===
- Larciano Castle

=== Natural areas ===
- Fucecchio Marsh

=== Other ===
- Monument to the martyrs of the Fucecchio Marsh. It was inaugurated in September 2002 in Castelmartini, where one of the bloodiest massacres, known as the massacre of the Fucecchio Marsh, was committed by the Nazis after the armistice. It is located in via Francesca. It is a Carrara marble work made by Gino Terreni from Empoli. The former President of the Italian Republic, Carlo Azeglio Ciampi, was present at the inauguration. There are seven preparatory works, including the original plaster of the monument to the martyrs of the Fucecchio Marsh, created and donated by Gino Terreni, at the new Centre for Research, Documentation and Promotion of the Fucecchio Marsh in Castelmartini.
- Garden of memory. It was inaugurated on August 23, 1996 in Castelmartini and it aims to commemorate the massacre carried out on August 23, 1944 by the Nazis, in which 175 people were killed. It was created by Andrea Dami and Simone Fagioli, who recovered the former cemetery by intervening with permanent art installations. The work called "Paysage", realized by Andrea Dami, consists of 36 panels dedicated to the dead of the municipality of Larciano: the quadrangular and cubic panels recall women, while the spherical and round ones evoke men. The shapes are not identical, as the lives of the victims were different, and they are located slightly obliquely to the horizon, representing the randomness and unpredictability of life. In addition, Andrea Dami and Simone Fagioli created the "walkable postcard" called "My brother is here", which is a series of graphic and cultural themes that emerged from eighty-two emails arriving from different countries of Europe, America and Asia. "My brother is here" consists of nine mosaic "pictograms-seats-tables-platforms" representing the world (universality of the message), the relationship between man and woman (human archetype), the eye (symbol of direct vision of massacre), the table of peace (element of constant reflection), the duality between sun and moon (duality of life), the cross (sacrifice of the 175 victims in the massacre), blood (blood of all the people killed), the dove (symbol of peace par excellence) and the word "no!" (one word against violence and war).

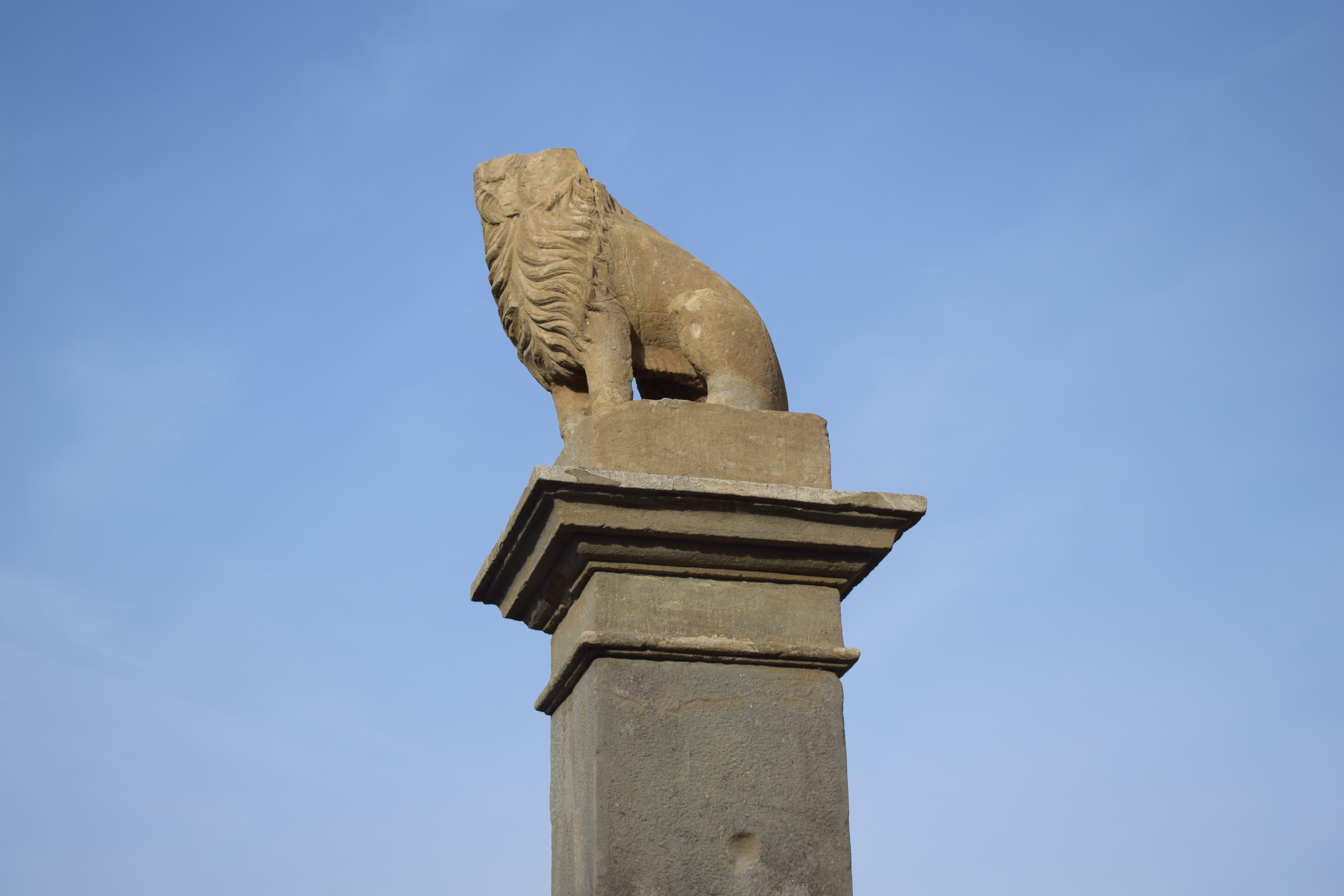

- Marzocco. In the Florentine Republic, the marzocco was a lion, symbol of the popular power. In the fourteenth century, next to Palazzo Vecchio (Florence), the Signoria kept a menagerie of lions, hence the name of the street "via dei Leoni" (literally “street of Lions”). Even today there is an example of marzocco in Piazza della Signoria in Florence. The example of marzocco situated in the centre of the square of Larciano Castello differs from the Florentine one in the absence of the lion's head; in fact, it is said that it was stolen by Cecina, the nearby and historical rival.
- Bagno gate, San Marco gate and South gate. Today the wall path presents three entrance gates; a northwest gate (San Marco gate), a northeast one (Bagno gate) and finally a south gate. In the description of the castle, the Liber Censuum book (dated back to the year 1382) mentions “duarum portis, quarum una vocatur Porta a Bagno, and alia Porta S. Marci”. However, it is difficult to recognize through this toponymy the gates mentioned above and, consequently, it is not easy to date them. The Bagno gate and the San Marco one have the same constructive characteristic, namely the Liutprando’s foot (ancient unit of measurement of Lombard origin); for this reason they can be dated between the tenth and thirteen centuries. While the San Marco gate is related to the expansion of the thirteen century walls, the Bagno gate could already be referred to the first stone walls dating back to the twelfth century. In addition, the latter gate suffered the lowering of the threshold level, linked to the profound changes in the internal viability of the castle, which also led to the destruction of part of the wall path. On the other hand, the southern gate is the most recent of the three access points to the village, as it can be noticed in the use of the Pistoiese arm as a modular base. It was built following the extension of the walls, so after the year 1382, but prior to the establishment of the Florentine arm as a single module in Tuscany, so before the end of the eighteenth-century.

== Culture ==
=== Library ===
In Larciano there is a municipal library which offers many services, such as the local, the interlibrary and the home loan, the consultation, some educational activities for adults and children and activities to promote reading and a playroom.

=== Research ===
- Astronomical observatory of Castelmartini.

=== Schools ===
In the municipality of Larciano it is possible to find two public kindergartens, a primary school and a middle school; the Istituto Comprensivo di Larciano includes all these schools.

=== Museums ===
- The Museum of Rural Life “Casa Dei”. Located inside a two-storey farmhouse inside the Fucecchio Marsh, the museum collects materials from the peasant life of the early twentieth century. The museum is divided into sections and the final goal is to make people aware of the relationship established between the place, the agricultural activity and the role in the rural life at that time. The aforementioned museum was created in collaboration with the Tuscany Region and with the patronage of the Province of Pistoia and the Municipality of Larciano within the project called "Along the Migratory Routes" and it has entered the museum network of the Tuscany Region since 2012.
- The Civic Museum of Larciano Castello. Located in Larciano Castello and inaugurated in 1975, the museum collects some objects coming from the Valdinievole area and others arriving from other places, through donations or temporary loans thanks to museums. The finds cover a large time frame that starts from prehistoric times until the late Renaissance. The museum is organized in two sections: a local and an educational section.

=== Gallery ===
- Cum Venio, home, studio, art gallery. Born in June 2022 from the renovation of the former convent in Piazza Quattro Martiri. The structure promotes local cultural realities, such as debates on various topics and local personalities, through book presentations, dissemination meetings and art exhibitions. Two of the most important held in its spaces, the one dedicated to the reinterpretation of "Leonardo's Women" and the first "Retrospective of the Work of Filippo Biagioli".

=== Events ===
- Settembre Larcianese (literally “September in Larciano”). The fair was created in 1874 to encourage the breeding and the livestock trade and it was annually held in the square of San Rocco. The fair was immediately successful, so much that in 1875 the square of San Rocco was enlarged to give more space to animals. In addition to the purchase of animals, the competition for the best beasts and the livestock exhibition, the fair gave the opportunity to take part in traditional competitions, to see the fireworks and to have a great time thanks to storytellers and fire eaters. In 1907 the flight of the “colombina” was introduced: this event was auspicious for the forthcoming agricultural year. Initially, the fair lasted only one day, more precisely it used to take place on the second Thursday of September; today it continues for several days. The program of the fair has been changed due to the economic transformation of the area, from agricultural to mainly industrial and artisanal; this is the reason why the animals for the various competitions are no longer seen in the square.
- Cherry festival: takes place in Castelmartini. Initially it used to last a week, from Sunday to Sunday at the turn of 13 June, at the same time as the celebrations in honor of Saint Anthony of Padua. Today the festival lasts for two weeks and continues to attract many citizens. The name of the festival is due to the fact that the cherries of the area are distributed free of charge during the first Sunday of celebrations.
- Castagnata (literally “chestnut festival”): takes place in Cecina on the penultimate Sunday of October. During the fair, chestnut products, such as “necci”, “castagnacci” and “frugiate”, can be found and there is also the possibility to taste the local wine.

== Human geography ==
=== Hamlets ===
Larciano is composed of four hamlets: Castelmartini, Cecina, Larciano Castello and San Rocco.

==== Castelmartini ====
It is a residential area characterized by a strong productive component. The original inhabited center, dating back to the end of the thirteenth century when a "castrum Martini Jacobi Admannati" is mentioned in the Liber censuum, is located west of via Francesca; in the same area there was the ancient hospital of San Donnino in Cerbaia, which has now disappeared and it is remembered through the name of the current church of Castelmartini. The ancient hospital was located not far from the place where Pistoia had a port which connected it with Pisa, through the canals of the marshes. Besides, this ancient hospital was connected to a road of considerable importance that crossed the Montalbano area, thus it was an important accommodation facility in the organization of the territory under the government of the Pistoian municipality. The Parish Church of Castelmartini, built as a chapel around 1200, underwent a radical makeover at the end of the nineteenth century, resulting in a late neoclassical aspect. In the building next to the church, the headquarters of the Centre for Research, Documentation and Promotion of the Fucecchio Marsh is located. Its purpose is to promote initiatives aimed to the conservation and enhancement of the marsh from an environmental and naturalistic point of view, in terms of an area of national and international interest. Proceeding towards the Morette Port, which is a particularly interesting area of access to the marsh, the Villa Poggi Banchieri is situated; it was built by expanding and modifying the ancient Castrum Martini which gave its name to this place.

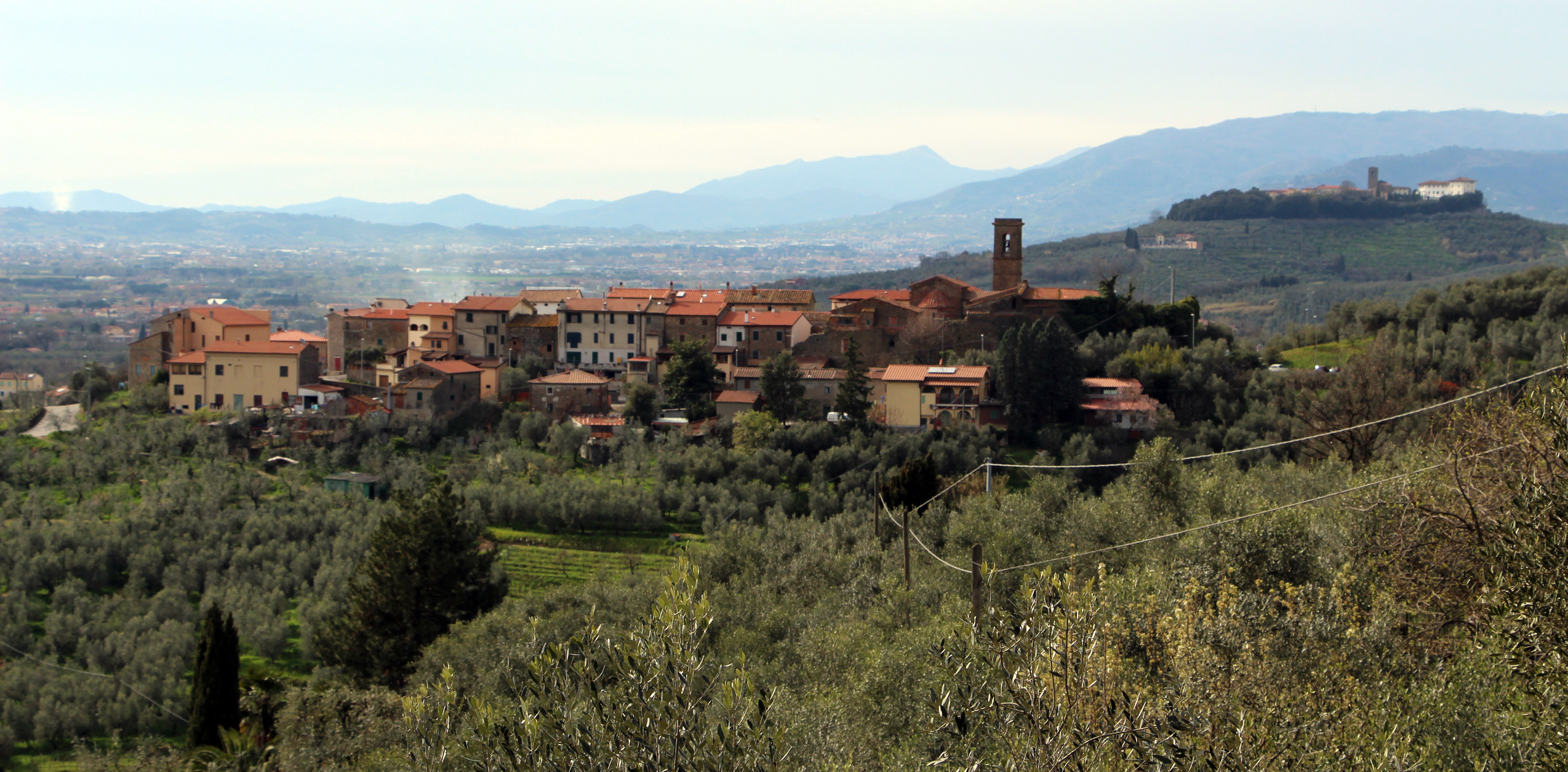
Cecina, on the background Montevettolini.

==== Cecina ====
It is a medieval village with walls and two entrance gates, located on the slopes of Montalbano; its origins are probably Etruscan and perhaps its name derives from the surname of the ancient Etruscan noble family of Volterra Kaiknas (in Latin Caecina). Within the walls there is the church of San Nicola, whose origins are Romanesque; the external hemicycle of the apse is preserved even if the entire structure has been radically remodelled over the centuries. The interior presents a vaulted roof and a single nave, along with the chapel of San Rosario situated on the left, whose altar dated to1632. In the second bay on the left, within a seventeenth-century frame, an expressive fourteenth century wooden crucifix is exhibited.

==== Larciano Castello ====
It has preserved the urban structure of a medieval village, developed on a sloping terrain, and it keeps the walls of the twelfth century with three entrance gates. The fortress is located at the highest point within the walls. The most important element of the fortress is the high quadrangular tower, from which you can observe a suggestive panorama that ranges from the Valdinievole area to the Lower Valdarno. Inside the fortress there is also a civic museum. The parish church of San Silvestro is characterized by a very simple plan with a single nave. Of medieval origin, this parish church does not provide many traces in the external walls and it has suffered radical transformations over the centuries. The rectory (the former Palazzo Podestarile) is a simple and massive building that looks out on the square, situated on the right of the church. At the centre of the square there is a column supporting the Marzocco, a reminder of the Florentine domination.

==== San Rocco ====
At the end of the nineteenth century, the population, that had settled inside the church of San Rocco since the seventeenth century, had grown considerably. In fact, a great number of people had moved from Larciano Castello to the flat areas, that had been reclaimed, so consequently, free from malaria and arable. The population commissioned the church in the place where there was already a small church dedicated to the Holy Virgin in 1631 when the plague, which had affected the territory of Larciano, was coming to an end and this building was dedicated to the saint considered the protector against evil.

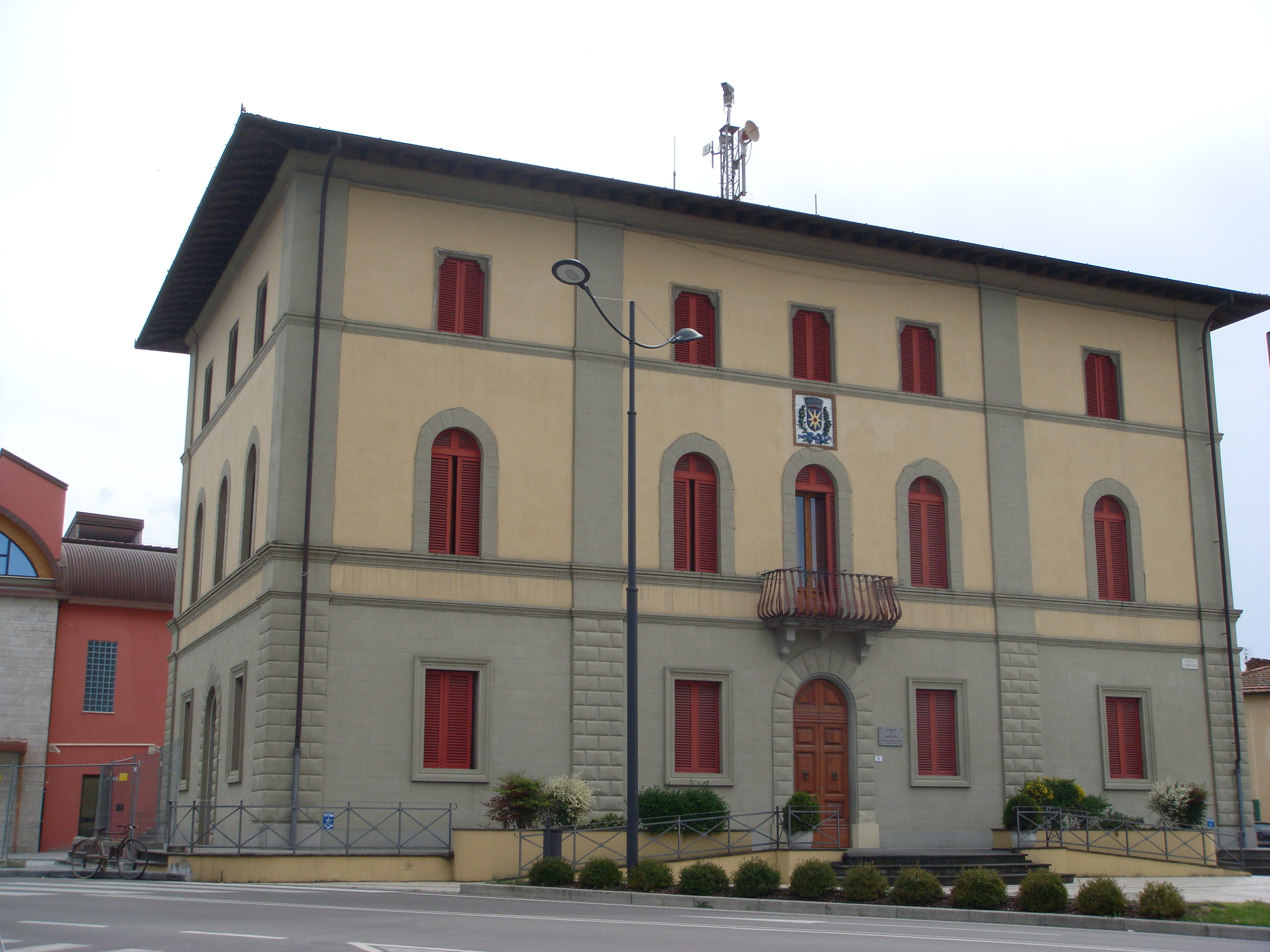
The Town Hall in the main square of San Rocco.

In 1884 San Rocco was detached from San Silvestro from which it used to depend, and three years later it was recognized as a parish. This event marked the beginning and the subsequent development of the town of San Rocco, different from Larciano Alto. In 1897 Larciano obtained the administrative autonomy from Lamporecchio and the centre of San Rocco obtained the seat of the Town Hall, restored and inaugurated in June 1997.

=== Other localities in the territory ===
In Larciano there are other smaller localities, such as Baccane, Biagiotti, Biccimurri, Case di Monte, Colonna, Mungherino and Puntoni.

== Media ==
=== Newspapers ===
Orizzonti is a cultural, informative and historical monthly magazine that deals with topics related to the municipalities of Larciano, Lamporecchio, Vinci and Cerreto Guidi; in the last years, articles related to Valdinievole area and Empoli are also inserted. The principal aim is to promote the socio-cultural activities linked to these territories; for this reason, readers are active users in the construction of this magazine, since they are invited to show any issues, proposals and suggestions, as well as they can write any articles having to do with topics of public interest.

== Administration ==
A table with the different administrations of the municipality of Larciano is shown below.

Period		Name	Political party	Political post	Note
17 July 1985	31 May 1990	Graziano Lustri	Partito Comunista Italiano	Mayor	
31 May 1990	22 April 1991	Graziano Lustri	Partito Comunista Italiano	Mayor	
22 April 1991	24 April 1995	Andrea Stefano Lollini	Partito Democratico della Sinistra	Mayor	
24 April 1995	14 June 1999	Andrea Stefano Lollini	Partito Democratico della Sinistra	Mayor	
14 June 1999	14 June 2004	Roberta Beneforti	Centro-Sinistra	Mayor	
14 June 2004	8 June 2009	Roberta Beneforti	Centro-Sinistra	Mayor	
8 June 2009	26 May 2014	Antonio Pappalardo	Lista Civica	Mayor	
26 May 2014	4 March 2015	Antonio Pappalardo	Lista Civica	Mayor	
4 March 2015	5 June 2016	Lisa Amidei	Lista Civica	Deputy Mayor acting as Mayor	
5 June 2016	In charge	Lisa Amidei	Lista Civica	Mayor	

=== Twin towns ===
- Poussan, from 2013
- Rousset, from 2013

== Sport ==
=== Football ===
Larciano has several football clubs, among which the most important is the U.S.D. Art. Ind. Larcianese, showing the expression of the community of artisans, industrialists and citizens of Larciano. Recently, the Larcianese football club has achieved unexpected goals for a little village such as Larciano: it won the Italy Amateur Cup in 1998 and it had been playing in D-Series for several years.

==== The tournament of the districts ====
The tournament of the districts is an amateur football event that generally takes place during summer and a large part of the residents of Larciano are actively engaged. The current form of the tournament presents six districts competing with each other:

- District of San Rocco
- District of Cecina Ponente
- District of Biccimurri
- District of Colonna
- District of Levante
- District of Larciano

Two rounds of three districts each are drawn lots. The finalists of the previous edition's tournament are placed as seeded in the two rounds. The teams of each round face each other in a single match; the winner of each round goes directly to the semifinals, while the second and third teams will participate in a play-off.

=== Cycling ===
The Larcianese U.C. association embodies the passion of residents for cycling. It organizes the GP Industria & Artigianato di Larciano, a cycling race for professionals that generally takes place at the beginning of March, between the Strade Bianche and the Tirreno-Adriatico.

The Larcianese cycling association was born thanks to Nello Bonfanti, who was the representative of the Salvarani cycling team. Founded the association, Bonfanti became involved in organizing cycling races; so, starting from the early 60s the tradition of the cycling race named "I circuiti degli assi" began in Larciano and it continued until the mid-70s.

This cycling association was recognized nationally and then internationally.
