= Neri Farina Cini =

Italian politician and entrepreneur (1878–1967)

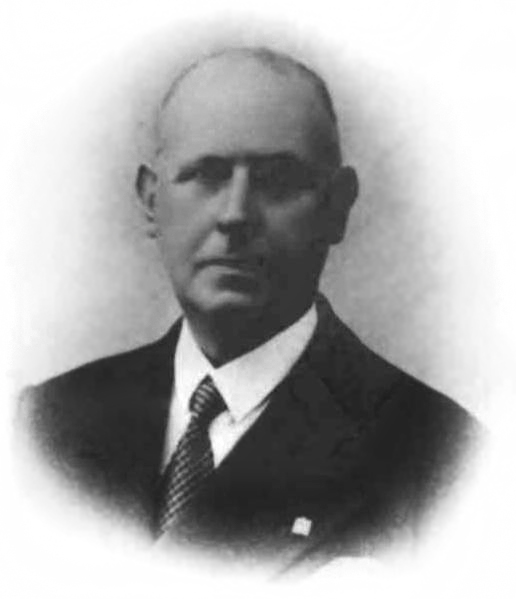

Senator of the Kingdom of Italy
- In office 29 April 1943 – August 1944

Member of the Chamber of Fasces and Corporations
- In office 11 March 1939 – 29 April 1943

President of the Province of Pistoia
- In office 1931–1935
- Preceded by: Alberto Cappugi
- Succeeded by: Mario Montemagni

Podestà of San Marcello Pistoiese
- In office 1927–1931

Personal details
- Born: 20 August 1878 Florence, Kingdom of Italy
- Died: 1967 (aged 88–89)
- Party: National Fascist Party
- Occupation: Entrepreneur, naval officer

Neri Farina Cini (20 August 1878 – 1967) was an Italian naval officer, industrial entrepreneur, and Fascist-era politician. He served as a member of the Chamber of Fasces and Corporations and later as a senator of the Kingdom of Italy during the final phase of the Fascist regime. He also served as podestà of San Marcello Pistoiese (1927–1931) and as president of the Province of Pistoia (1931–1935).

He oversaw significant growth at the paper mill, which in 1925 merged with the Tuscan Industrial Paper Processing Plant in Florence. He was also active in the fields of both maritime and rail transportation; for many years, he served on the board of directors of the Navigazione Generale Italiana and was a member of the board of directors of the Società per le Strade Ferrate Meridionali.
