= Pieve of San Silvestro =

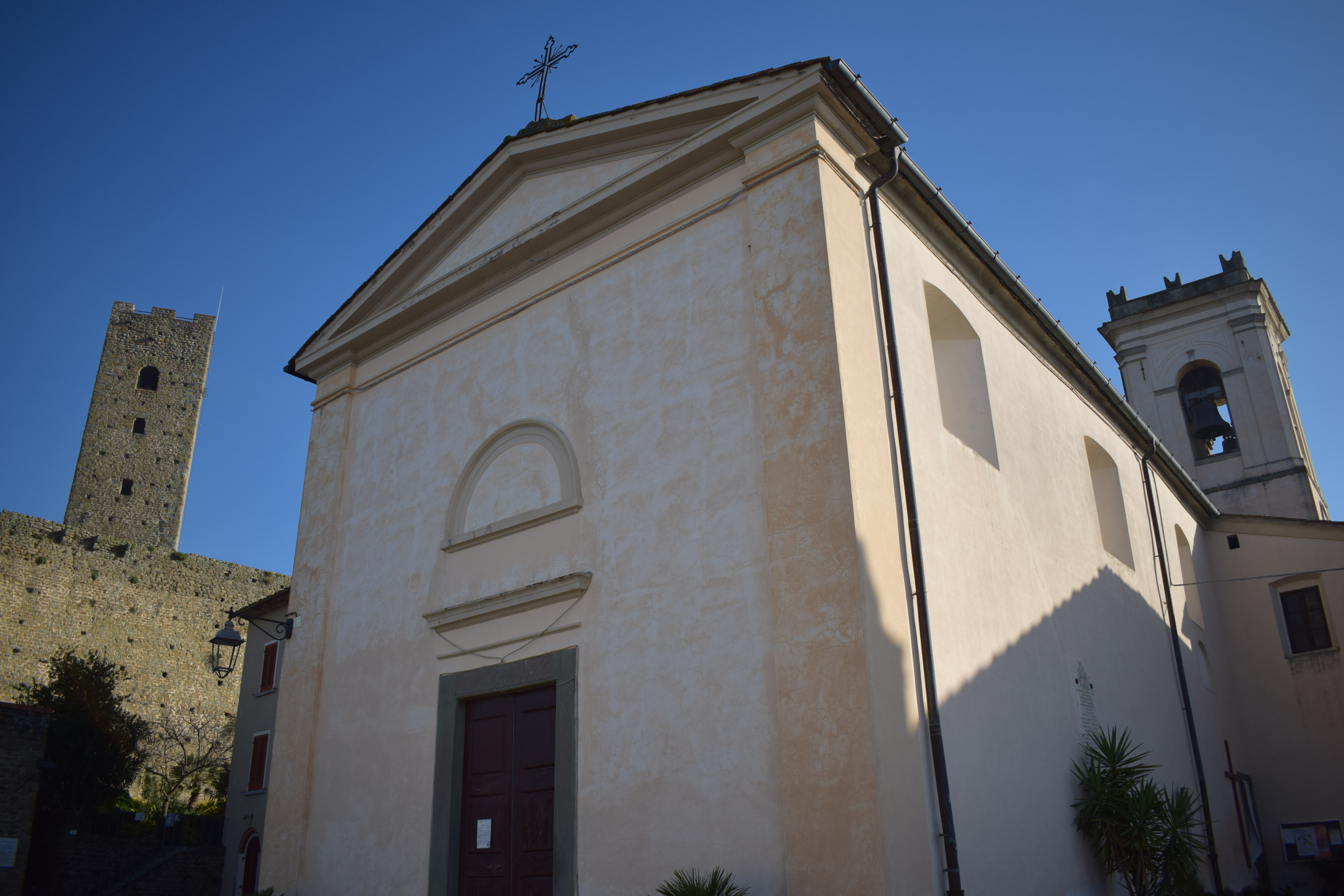

Religion
- Affiliation: Christianity
- Province: Pistoia
- Region: Tuscany
- Ecclesiastical or organizational status: Active
- Patron: Pope Sylvester I

Location
- Municipality: Larciano
- State: Italy
- Interactive map of Pieve of San Silvestro

San Silvestro is a Roman Catholic pieve dedicated to Saint Sylvester located in the municipality of Larciano, in the province of Pistoia, in Tuscany, Italy. The property belongs to the Diocese of San Miniato, Florence.

== History ==
A temple had previously been a pagan temple and had already been transformed into a church and dedicated to Saint Martin. This church is dedicated to Saint Sylvester because, during his pontificate in the fourth century, the local population converted to Christianity.

This would confirm the hypothesis according to which the building dates back to the Paleo-Christian period; however, there are no visible traces left of either that building or subsequent Romanesque structures, with the possible exception of some foundations or walls.

== Interior ==
During a 16th century rebuilding, the single nave was lengthened and the apse demolished; the layout then replaced with a Latin cross transept and a rectangular apse. On the counter-façade, there is the organ, perhaps the oldest one in the Valdinievole area (probably of the 16th or 17th-century), with organ screens in carved, painted, and gilded wood. At the entrance, two 17th-century holy water fonts are situated. The right one is set on a 15th-century column; inside a niche, a beautiful hexagonal marble baptismal font can be found, supported by a pedestal with a band. The latter is decorated with the ancient Larciano Medici coat of arms (the wild boar) and that of the Gori family who had built it in 1532, as the inscription shows. Some argue, however, that the Gori family represents the workers of the factory, donors of the work. A painting depicts the Miracles of St Anthony between St Francis and St Michael the Archangel (1663). At the center of the choir, a 19th-century painting depicts St Sylvester baptizing Costantine by Bartolomeo Valiani.

The main altar was built with sandstone and stucco in 1748, but, during the early nineteenth century, it underwent some rebuilding works, bringing to light the walnut choir, still located inside the church. On the altars, canvases depict St Anthony of Padua, St Francis, and St Michael the Archangel and contains an altar-piece with St. Anthony holding baby Jesus, another shows seven scenes of the saint's miracles, divided by panels with small cherubs supporting a cartouche. On the back, there is the following inscription: "This panel was made of alms from the citizens of Larciano on the advice of Piero di Antonio di Vincenzo di Bartolo di Giovanni, prior of Larciano the year of the foundation of this office 1663".
