= Lago Piatto =

Lake in Tuscany, Italy

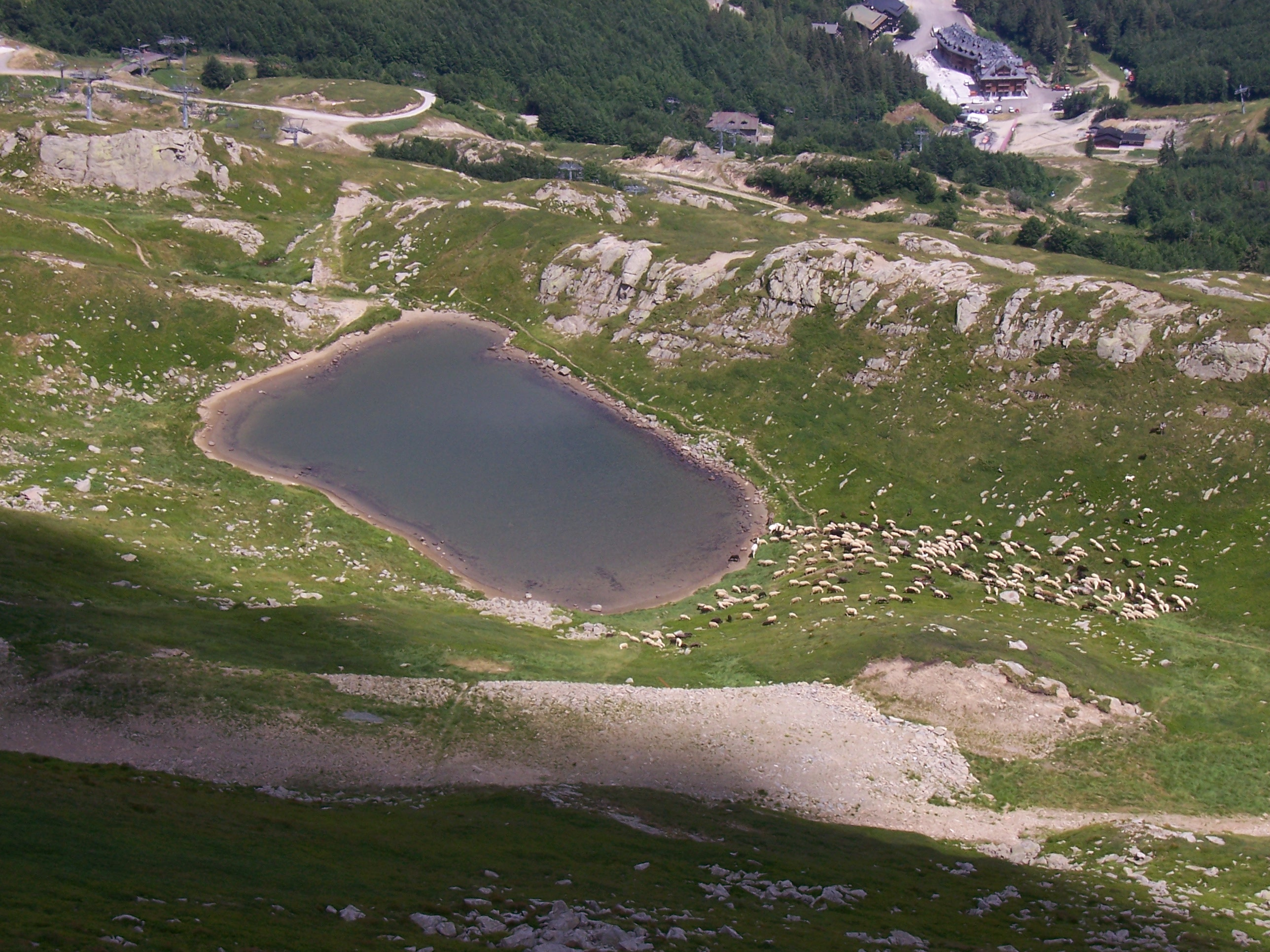

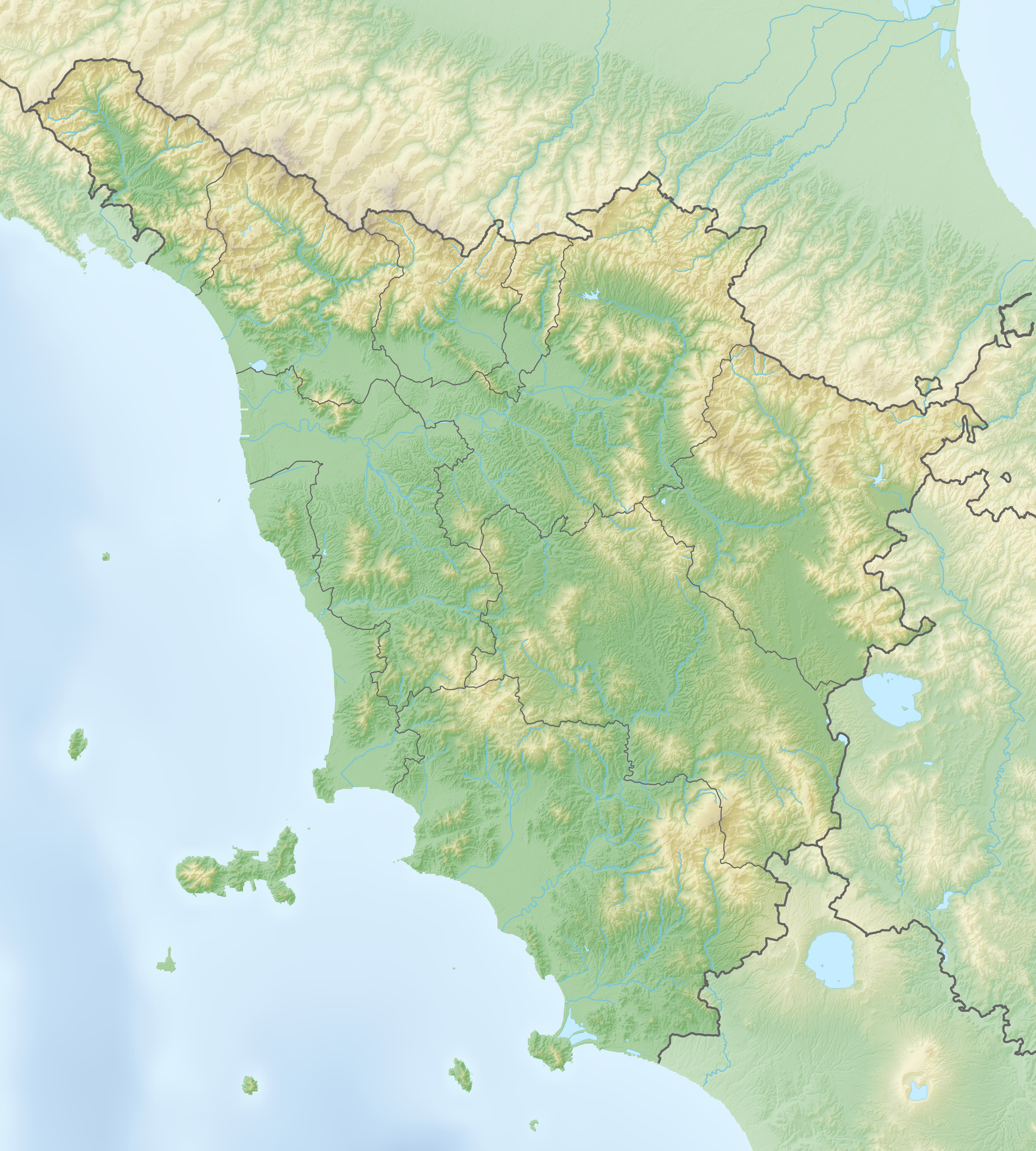
- Location within Tuscany
- Location: Province of Pistoia, Tuscany, Italy
- Coordinates: 44°07′08″N 10°37′50″E
- Basin countries: Italy
- Surface elevation: 1,823 m (5,981 ft)

Lago Piatto (lit. 'flat lake') is a lake in the province of Pistoia, Tuscany, Italy.
