= Federica Fratoni =

Italian politician

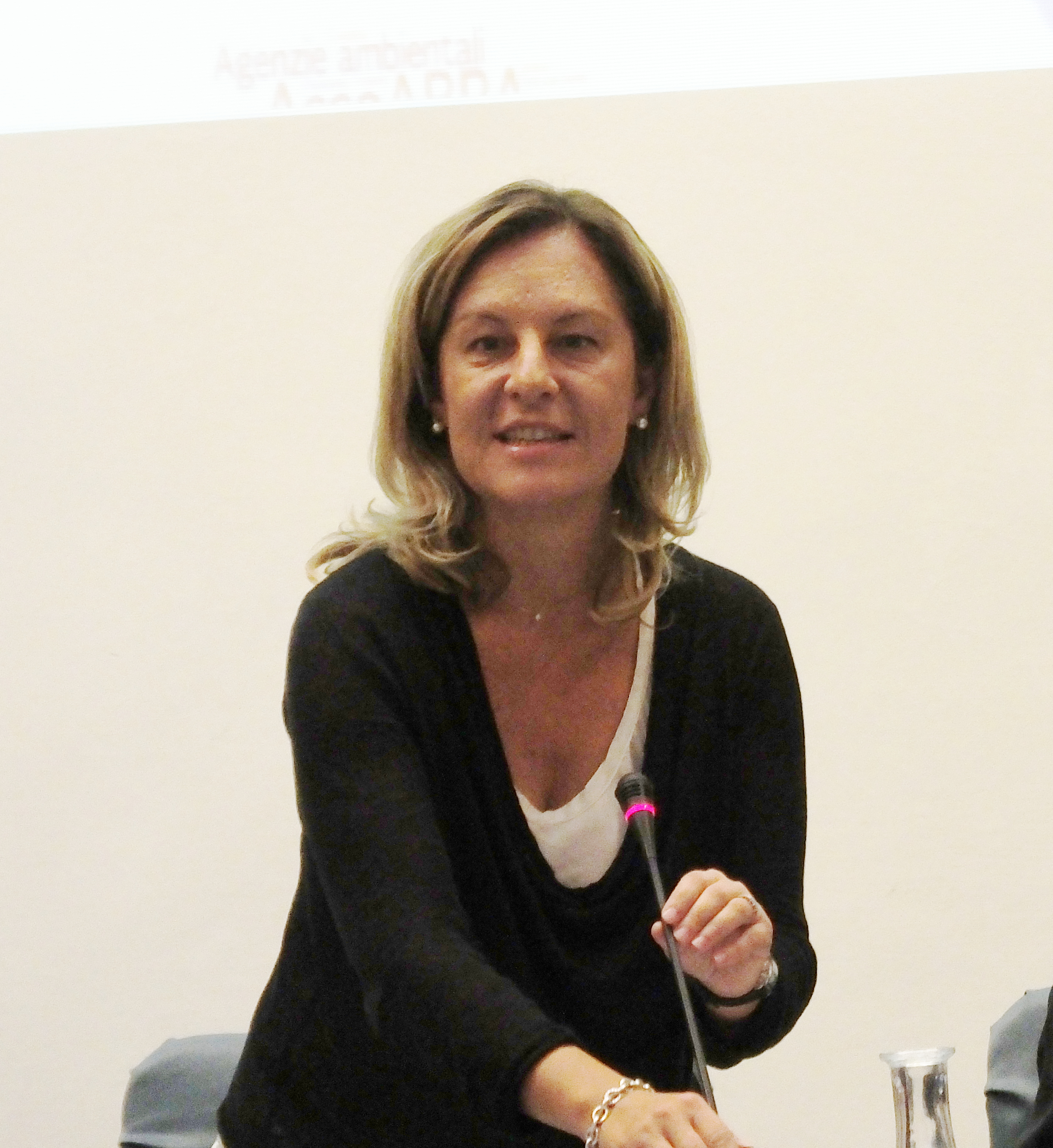

President of the Province of Pistoia
- In office 8 June 2009 – 19 July 2015
- Preceded by: Gianfranco Venturi
- Succeeded by: Rinaldo Vanni

Member of the Regional Council of Tuscany
- In office 17 June 2015 – 1 July 2015
- Succeeded by: Massimo Baldi
- In office 8 October 2020 – 29 October 2025

Regional assessor for Environment of Tuscany
- In office 1 July 2015 – 8 October 2020
- President: Enrico Rossi
- Preceded by: Anna Rita Bramerini
- Succeeded by: Monia Monni

Personal details
- Born: 8 June 1972 (age 54) Florence, Tuscany, Italy
- Party: Democratic Party
- Education: University of Florence

Federica Fratoni (born 8 June 1972) is an Italian politician of the Democratic Party. She served as president of the Province of Pistoia from 2009 to 2015, becoming the first woman to hold the office. She was later elected at the Regional Council of Tuscany, also serving as regional assessor for Environment of Tuscany from 2015 to 2020.

In 2022, Fratoni was the centre-left candidate for mayor of Pistoia, supported by the Democratic Party, the Five Star Movement and allied civic lists. She was defeated by the incumbent mayor Alessandro Tomasi, receiving 28.3% of the vote against Tomasi's 51.5%.
