= Gianfranco Venturi =

Italian politician

President of the Province of Pistoia
- In office 13 June 1999 – 14 June 2009
- Preceded by: Aldo Morelli
- Succeeded by: Federica Fratoni

Member of the Regional Council of Tuscany
- In office 29 March 2010 – 31 May 2015

Personal details
- Born: 4 February 1952 (age 74) Pistoia, Italy
- Party: Italian Communist Party; Democratic Party of the Left; Democrats of the Left; Democratic Party

Gianfranco Venturi (born 4 February 1952) is an Italian politician who served as president of the Province of Pistoia (1999–2009) and as a member of the Regional Council of Tuscany (2010–2015).

== Life and career ==
Born in Pistoia in 1952, Venturi was a leading member of the Italian Communist Party (PCI) in the province of Pistoia, serving as secretary of its local federation from 1982 to 1989. He was elected to the Pistoia City Council in 1975 and later served on the Provincial Council from 1990, also serving as assessor in the provincial executive (1993–1999). In 1999 he was elected president of the Province of Pistoia in the first round of voting with more than 52% of the vote, and was re-elected in 2004.

He subsequently joined the Democratic Party (PD), helping to establish its local organization, and served as its provincial coordinator in Pistoia from February to November 2009.

In the 2010 regional election, Venturi was elected to the Regional Council of Tuscany in the constituency of Pistoia. During his term, he served as secretary of the First Commission (Institutional Affairs, Planning and Budget), a member of the Oversight Commission, and later as president of the Sixth Commission (Territory and Environment).

Venturi left the Democratic Party in 2013, two years before the end of his term as a regional councillor. Following the conclusion of his term in 2015, he withdrew from political life.
