= Massa e Cozzile =

- Comune
- Comune di Massa e Cozzile
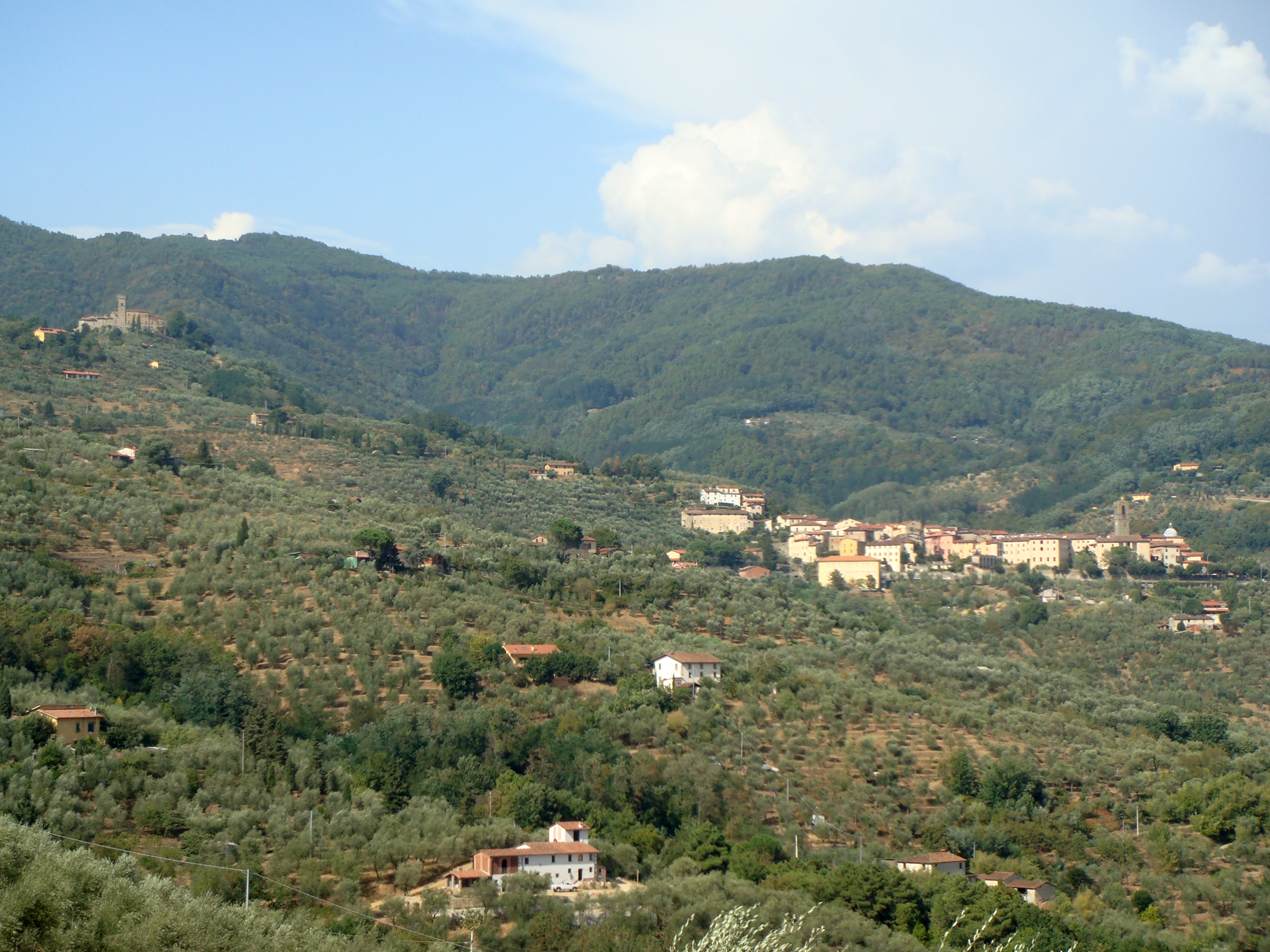
- View of Cozzile (left) and Massa (right)

- Coat of arms

- Location within Italy Location within Tuscany
- Coordinates: 43°55′N 10°45′E
- Country: Italy
- Region: Tuscany
- Province: Pistoia (PT)
- Frazioni: Cozzile, Croci, Margine Coperta, Massa (municipal seat), Traversagna, Vacchereccia, Vangile

Government
  - Mayor: Marzia Niccoli

Area
  - Total: 16.01 km^{2} (6.18 sq mi)
- Elevation: 223 m (732 ft)

Population (31 October 2017)
  - Total: 7,925
  - Density: 495.0/km^{2} (1,282/sq mi)
- Demonym(s): Massesi and Cozzilesi
- Time zone: UTC+1 (CET)
  - Summer (DST): UTC+2 (CEST)
- Postal code: 51010
- Dialing code: 0572
- Patron saint: St. Roch
- Saint day: 16 August
- Website: Official website

Massa e Cozzile is a comune (municipality) in the Province of Pistoia in the Italian region Tuscany, located about 45 kilometres (28 mi) northwest of Florence and about 14 kilometres (9 mi) west of Pistoia, in the central part of the Valdinievole. It was the birthplace of composer Bernardo Pasquini.

Massa e Cozzile borders the following municipalities: Buggiano, Marliana, Montecatini Terme and Pescia.

== Physical geography ==
The comune is located in the central part of Valdinievole. Massa e Cozzile's territory is split into two distinct areas: in the north the territory is mostly hilly, often alternating with tall mountains (the highest peak is at 770-885 m), this is where the settlements of Massa and Cozzile are properly located, both being small medieval towns with only around a hundred inhabitants. The southern part of the territory is flatter and composed only of plains, and most of the comune's population lives here as, unlike the northern settlements, these (particularly the neighbourhoods of Margine Coperta and Traversagna) are much more modern and industrialised and most of the services are located here.

As for watercourses, there is no significant river in the comune but only small streams, particularly the Gamberaio and the Borra which later flow into the Padule region and their water fuel the Arno river.

== History ==
The territory of Massa e Cozzile, as well as the broader region of Valdinievole, has been inhabited since prehistoric times, but for the most part it was simply a region of transit due to it being a heavily marshy region. At one point it became a disputed area between the ancient ligures and the etruscans, who often fought over the land. The ancient romans were able to impose their hegemony over the territory after decades of fighting, and often gifted the conquered lands to retired soldiers (veterans). The Romans later built the via Cassia, which connected Rome to the city of Luni.

It is in this context, around the 4th or 3rd century BC, that an agricultural establishment was founded, that corresponds with the modern-day village of Massa. Nothing of it remains today in the modern settlement, except for a handful of ruins and gates (most of which are now fully derelict, except for the Porta ai campi and the Porta a Buggiano) which in the present day constitute the so-called catrio, the settlement is believed to have developed around this establishment, and the first mention of it in ancient records is dated to the year 976.

During the high Middle ages, the region was a buffer zone between the lombards (who controlled the Padule and the region of Lucca) and the byzantine empire (which still controlled Pistoia), and after many wars it definitively fell under the control of the republic of Lucca. The castle of Cozzile was probably built around this period, and the two communities started closely cooperating until they became a single entity. In 1303 an army coming from Massa conquered the castle of Verruca, originally in the hands of Pistoia, and it became an integral part of the comune, even though Verruca would eventually be abandoned and the castle itself destroyed. Massa e Cozzile therefore became a polycentric comune: while it was seen by outsiders as a single entity, the three communities that composed it (Massa, Cozzile and Verruca) had their own autonomy and could equally make their voices be heard. To this day the three communities are represented on the coat of arms: the mace stands for Massa, the fleur-de-lis stands for Cozzile and the greek cross stands for Verruca.

After the death of Castruccio Castracani in 1328, Lucca lost its influence on Valdinievole, which paved the way for the infiltration of Florence. Inside of the duchy of Florence, later the grand duchy of Tuscany, Massa e Cozzile became a podesteria (a sort of mayoralty, administered by a podestà) and was able to reach a certain level of autonomy from the main center, until administrative reforms united the entirety of Valdinievole, with the exception of Pescia, under the podesteria of Buggiano. With the unification of Italy in 1861, Massa e Cozzile and the other comuni became part of the province of Lucca, until they were transferred to the newly-created province of Pistoia in 1928. The comune underwent rapid modernisation and industrialisation efforts, especially in its southern region with the development of the neighbourhoods of Margine Coperta and Traversagna.

In 1944, during the period of italian resistance, a group of German soldiers destroyed a bridge on the local watercourse and later executed an innocent 39-year old resident named Aladino Sabatini. A street was named after him in memory.

== Main sights ==
=== Neighbourhoods and quarters ===
Officially, Massa e Cozzile recognises five neighbourhoods (frazioni) inside of its territory:

- Massa
- Cozzile
- Margine Coperta
- Traversagna
- Vangile

Massa serves as the de facto administrative center of the comune, despite it not having legally an actual center of power (this is known as a comune sparso, "scattered municipality"), despite this most of the citizens live in the neighbourhoods of Margine Coperta and Traversagna. Other quarters and minor localities include: Verruca, Croci, Vacchereccia, Le Molina, Biscolla, Bruceto, Mortineto and others.

=== Churches ===
- Church of San Jacopo Maggiore, in Cozzile.
- Church of Santa Maria Assunta, in Massa.
- Church of Santa Rita, in Margine Coperta.
- Sanctuary of Croci, in Croci.
- Church of San Sebastiano e San Rocco, in Vangile.
- Church of the Santissima Trinità, in Traversagna.

=== Civil architectures and other places of interest ===
- Villa Belvedere-Ankuri Pucci (serves as medical center since 1978), in Margine Coperta.
- San Michele museum, in Massa.
- Palazzo Pretorio (de facto town hall), in Massa.
- Castle of Cozzile, in Cozzile.
- Villa Gusci (now closed to the public), in Traversagna.
- Barano bridge, in Querceto.
- Massa e Cozzile multi-sports center, in Margine Coperta.
- "Montecatini" shopping centre, in Biscolla.

== Twin towns ==
- Judenburg, Austria
- Bir Gandus, Western Sahara (Sahrawi Arab Democratic Republic)
