= Bernesque poetry =

Bernesque poetry is a genre of satirical poetry that flourished during the Italian Renaissance. The style is named after Francesco Berni, an early pioneer of the style who popularized it across Europe.

== Tropes ==
Bernesque poetry is noted for its humorous and mocking tone, as well as its tendency to make light of serious or distressing situations. Bernesque poetry often relies on double meanings which are deployed in a masterful way-characteristically incarnated in food items or objects of daily use.
