= Marliana =

Municipality in Tuscany, Italy

- Comune
- Comune di Marliana
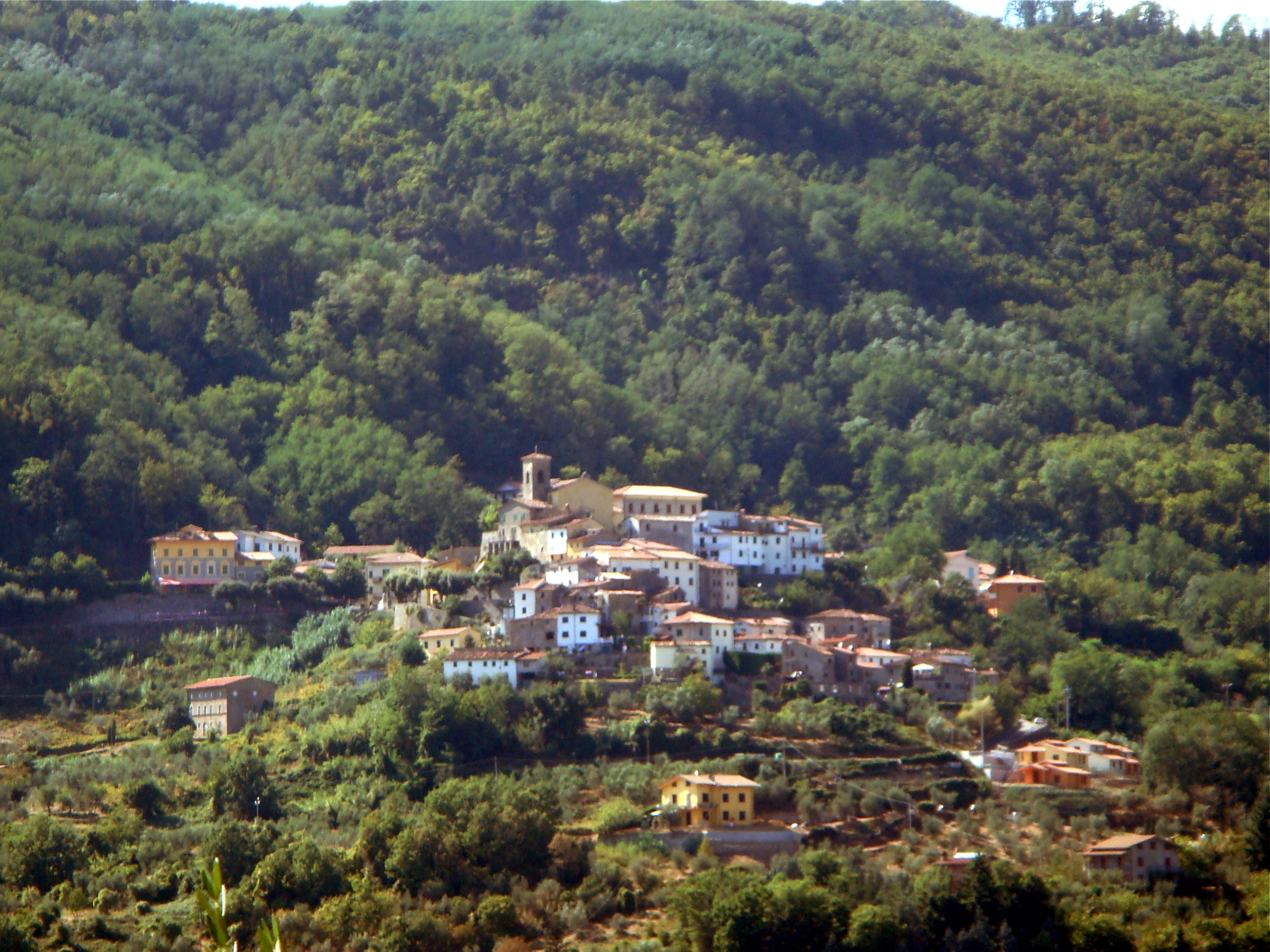
- View of Marliana

- Coat of arms

- Location within Italy Location within Tuscany
- Coordinates: 43°56′N 10°46′E
- Country: Italy
- Region: Tuscany
- Province: Pistoia (PT)
- Frazioni: Avaglio, Campomaggio, Petrolo, Casore del Monte, Fagno, Giampierone, Grati, Marliana, Momigno, Montagnana pistoiese, Novelleto, Panicagliora, Serra Pistoiese, Femminamorta

Government
  - Mayor: Marco Traversari

Area
  - Total: 43.04 km^{2} (16.62 sq mi)
- Elevation: 469 m (1,539 ft)

Population (30 September 2017)
  - Total: 3,179
  - Density: 73.86/km^{2} (191.3/sq mi)
- Demonym: Marlianesi
- Time zone: UTC+1 (CET)
  - Summer (DST): UTC+2 (CEST)
- Postal code: 51010
- Dialing code: 0572
- Patron saint: St. Nicholas
- Saint day: 6 December
- Website: Official website

Marliana is a municipality (Italian: comune) in the Province of Pistoia in the Italian region Tuscany, located about 40 kilometres (25 mi) northwest of Florence and about 12 kilometres (7 mi) west of Pistoia.

The church of St. Nicholas, known from 1373, houses two statuettes attributed to Benedetto Buglioni.

Marliana borders the following municipalities: Massa e Cozzile, Montecatini Terme, Pescia, Pistoia, San Marcello Piteglio, Serravalle Pistoiese.

== Twinning ==
The municipality is a twin town of Saint-Léger-en-Yvelines (Yvelines, France) since 2006
