= List of presidents of the Province of Pistoia =

President of the Province of Pistoia
- Presidente della Provincia di Pistoia
- Incumbent; Luca Marmo since 9 April 2019
- Term length: 4 years
- Deputy: Lisa Amidei

The president of the Province of Pistoia is the head of the provincial government in Pistoia, Tuscany, Italy. The president oversees the administration of the province, coordinates the activities of the municipalities, and represents the province in regional and national matters. Since April 2019, the office has been held by Luca Marmo of the Democratic Party.

== History ==
The Province of Pistoia was established in 1927 during the Fascist regime, when it was separated from the Province of Florence. The province was then administrated by the president of the Provincial Rectorate, an official appointed by the central government. After World War II, democratic provincial bodies were restored. In 1951, the modern office of the president of the Province of Pistoia was established as the head of the provincial executive, working alongside the Provincial Council.

From 1951 to 1995, the president was elected by the Provincial Council. Between 1995 and 2014, the president was directly elected by the citizens of the province. Following the 2014 Delrio reform, presidents have been elected by the assembly of mayors and municipal councillors of the municipalities within the province, and the term of office was reduced from five to four years.

== List ==
=== Presidents of the Provincial Rectorate (1927-1944) ===
No.	Portrait	Name	Term of office		Party
No.	Portrait	Name	Start	End	Party
1		Alberto Cappugi	April 1929	1931	National Fascist Party
2		Neri Farina Cini	1931	1935	National Fascist Party
3		Mario Montemagni	1935	?	National Fascist Party

=== Presidents of the Province (1951–present) ===
No.	Portrait	Name	Term of office		Party	Election
No.	Portrait	Name	Start	End	Party	Election
1		Emanuele Romei	1951	1956	Italian Communist Party	1951
2		Vincenzo Nardi	1956	1960	Italian Socialist Party	1956
2		Vincenzo Nardi	1960	1964	Italian Socialist Party	1960
3		Luigi Nanni	1964	1967	Italian Communist Party	1964
(2)		Vincenzo Nardi	1967	1970	Italian Socialist Party	1964
(2)		Vincenzo Nardi	1970	1975	Italian Socialist Party	1970
4		Vasco Mati	1975	1977	Italian Communist Party	1975
5		Ivo Lucchesi	1977	1980	Italian Communist Party	1975
5		Ivo Lucchesi	1980	1982	Italian Communist Party	1980
6		Vittorio Soldi	1982	1985	Italian Socialist Party	1980
7		Riccardo Rastelli	27 June 1985	26 July 1990	Italian Communist Party	1985
8		Aldo Morelli	26 July 1990	8 May 1995	Democratic Party of the Left	1990
8		Aldo Morelli	8 May 1995	14 June 1999	Democratic Party of the Left	1995
9		Gianfranco Venturi	14 June 1999	12 June 2004	Democrats of the Left; Democratic Party	1999
9		Gianfranco Venturi	12 June 2004	8 June 2009	Democrats of the Left; Democratic Party	2004
10		Federica Fratoni	8 June 2009	29 October 2014	Democratic Party	2009
10		Federica Fratoni	29 October 2014	20 April 2015	Democratic Party	2014
–		Rinaldo Vanni	20 April 2015	20 July 2015	Democratic Party	2014
11		Rinaldo Vanni	20 July 2015	26 February 2019	Democratic Party	2015
–		Marzia Niccoli (acting)	26 February 2019	9 April 2019	Democratic Party	2015
12		Luca Marmo	9 April 2019	11 July 2023	Democratic Party	2019
12		Luca Marmo	11 July 2023	Incumbent	Democratic Party	2023

== Sources ==
- Palla, Marco; Innocenti, Michela (2007). Provinciali del fascismo. La struttura politica e sociale del Pnf a Pistoia, 1921-1943. Gli Ori.
