= Luca Marmo =

Italian politician (born 1967)

President of the Province of Pistoia
- Incumbent
- Assumed office 9 April 2019
- Preceded by: Rinaldo Vanni

Mayor of San Marcello Piteglio
- Incumbent
- Assumed office 12 June 2017
- Preceded by: Office established

Mayor of Piteglio
- In office 26 May 2014 – 1 January 2017
- Preceded by: Claudio Gaggini
- Succeeded by: Office abolished

Personal details
- Born: 18 November 1967 (age 58) Aarau, Switzerland
- Party: PDS; DS; PD

Luca Marmo (born 18 November 1967) is an Italian politician of the Democratic Party who has served as president of the Province of Pistoia since 2019 and as mayor of San Marcello Piteglio since 2017.

== Life and career ==
Born in Switzerland, Marmo returned to Italy during his youth and attended the scientific high school in Pistoia. He also studied at the music conservatories of Lucca and Florence, graduating in music studies. He later worked in public administration and as a music teacher in secondary schools. In 2012, he graduated in industrial and information engineering from the University of Pisa.

In 1995, Marmo began his political career in the municipality of Piteglio, where he served as a municipal councillor and assessor. He was elected mayor of Piteglio in 2014 and remained in office until the municipality was merged into the newly established municipality of San Marcello Piteglio on 1 January 2017. Following the merger, he was elected the first mayor of San Marcello Piteglio on 12 June 2017 and was re-elected in 2022.

On 9 April 2019, Marmo was elected president of the Province of Pistoia. He was re-elected to the office in 2023.
