= Pieve a Nievole =

- Comune
- Comune di Pieve a Nievole
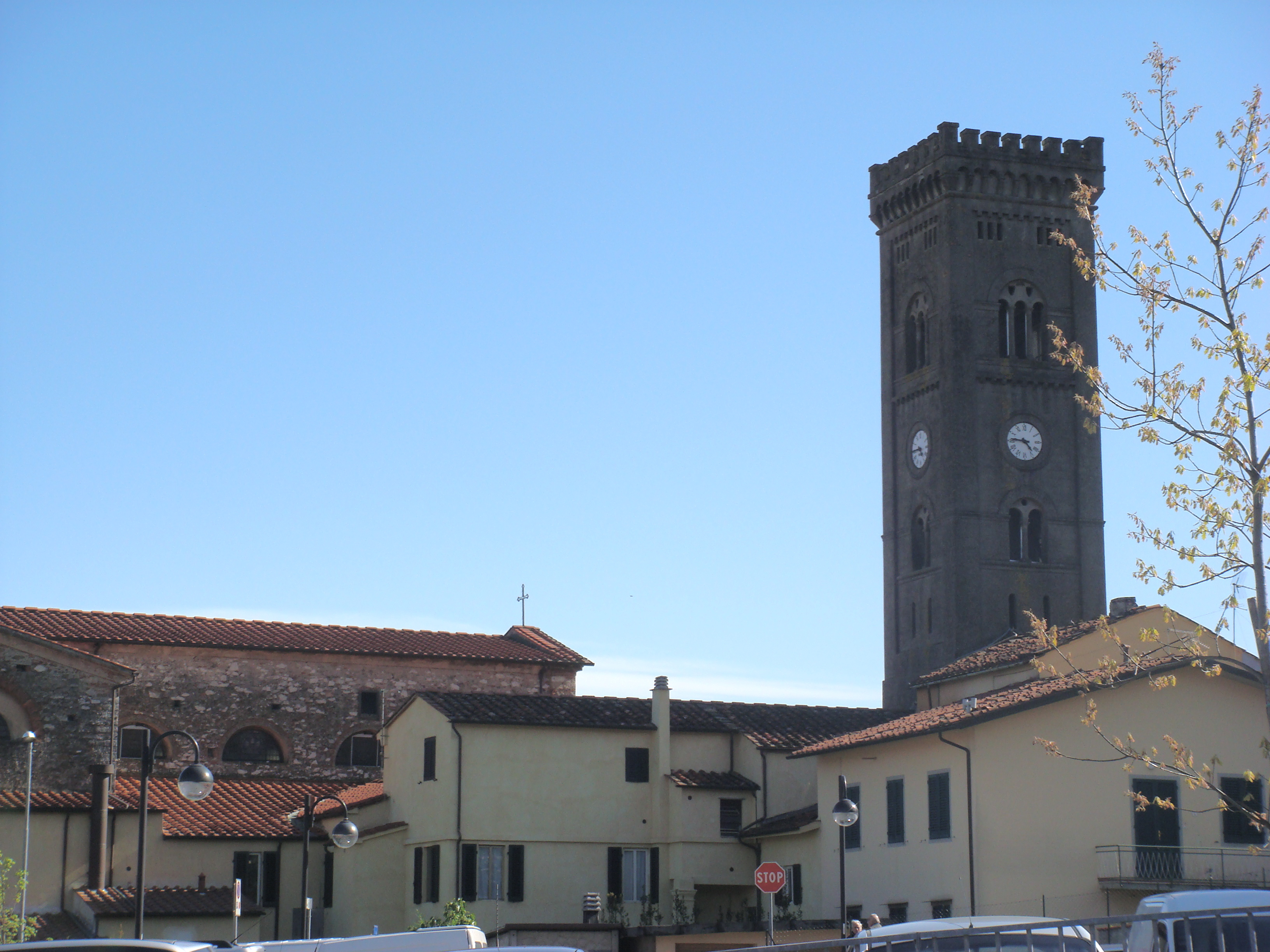
- Center of Pieve a Nievole

- Location within Italy Location within Tuscany
- Coordinates: 43°52′N 10°49′E
- Country: Italy
- Region: Tuscany
- Province: Pistoia (PT)
- Frazioni: Via Nova, Poggetto, La Colonna

Government
  - Mayor: Gilda Diolaiuti

Area
  - Total: 12.67 km^{2} (4.89 sq mi)
- Elevation: 28 m (92 ft)

Population (31 December 2010)
  - Total: 9,632
  - Density: 760.2/km^{2} (1,969/sq mi)
- Demonym: Pievarini
- Time zone: UTC+1 (CET)
  - Summer (DST): UTC+2 (CEST)
- Postal code: 51018
- Dialing code: 0572
- Patron saint: Saint Mark
- Saint day: 25 April
- Website: Official website

Pieve a Nievole is a comune (municipality) in the Province of Pistoia in the Italian region Tuscany, located about 35 kilometres (22 miles) northwest of Florence and about 11 km (7 mi) southwest of Pistoia.

Pieve a Nievole borders the following municipalities: Monsummano Terme, Montecatini-Terme, Ponte Buggianese, Serravalle Pistoiese.
