= Francesco Berni =

Italian poet (1497/98–1535)

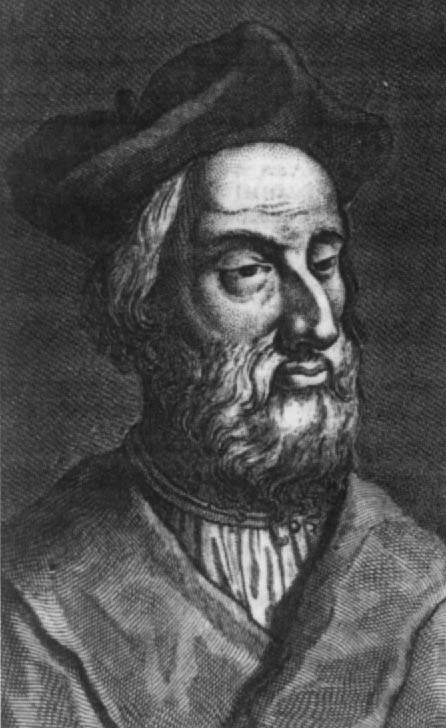
Francesco Berni

Francesco Berni (1497/98 – 26 May 1535) was an Italian poet. He is credited for beginning what is now known as "Bernesque poetry", a serio-comedic type of poetry with elements of satire.

== Biography ==
=== Life ===
Berni was born 1497 or 1498 in Lamporecchio (Tuscany).

His father Nicolò was a doctor of a long-established Florentine family, but excessively poor. At an early age he was sent to Florence, where he remained until his nineteenth year and wrote a pastoral play, Catrina. In 1517 he set out for Rome, in the service of Bernardo Dovizi, Cardinal Bibbiena. After the cardinal's death (1520), he was thrown on his own devices. At the time of the election of Adrian VI he circulated witty lampoons, for which he was obliged for a time to leave Rome. Later he returned to accept a situation as clerk or secretary to Gian Matteo Giberti, datary to Clement VII. The duties of his office, for which Berni was in every way unfit, were exceedingly irritating to the poet, who, however, made himself celebrated at Rome as the most witty and inventive of a certain club of literary men, who devoted themselves to light and sparkling effusions.

So strong was the admiration for Berni's verses, that mocking or burlesque poems have since been called poesie bernesche. About the year 1530 he was relieved from his servitude by obtaining a canonry in the cathedral of Florence.

He died in Florence, 1536, and according to Romantic tradition poisoned by Duke Alessandro de Medici, for having refused to poison the duke's cousin, Ippolito de' Medici; but considerable obscurity rests over this story.

=== Works ===
Berni undertook the revision of the whole poem, avowedly altering no sentiment, removing or adding no incident, but simply giving to each line and stanza due gracefulness and polish. His task he completed with marvellous success; scarcely a line remains as it was, and the general opinion has pronounced decisively in favour of the revision over the original. To each canto he prefixed a few stanzas of reflective verse in the manner of Ariosto, and in one of these introductions he gives us the only certain information we have concerning his own life. Berni appears to have been favorably disposed towards the Reformation principles at that time introduced into Italy, and this may explain the bitterness of some remarks of his upon the church. The first edition of the Rifacimento was printed posthumously in 1541, and it has been supposed that a few passages either did not receive the author's final revision, or have been retouched by another hand.

The success of Berni's Rifacimento was so great that the original text by Boiardo fell into oblivion for three centuries. Only in the nineteenth century did Anthony Panizzi discover in the British Museum Library the authentic Orlando Innamorato and publish it. A partial translation of Berni's Orlando was published by W.S. Rose in 1823.

== Legacy ==
Streets in Florence, Empoli, Pietrasanta, Varese and Verona have been named via Francesco Berni after him.
