= Cerreto Guidi =

- Comune
- Comune di Cerreto Guidi
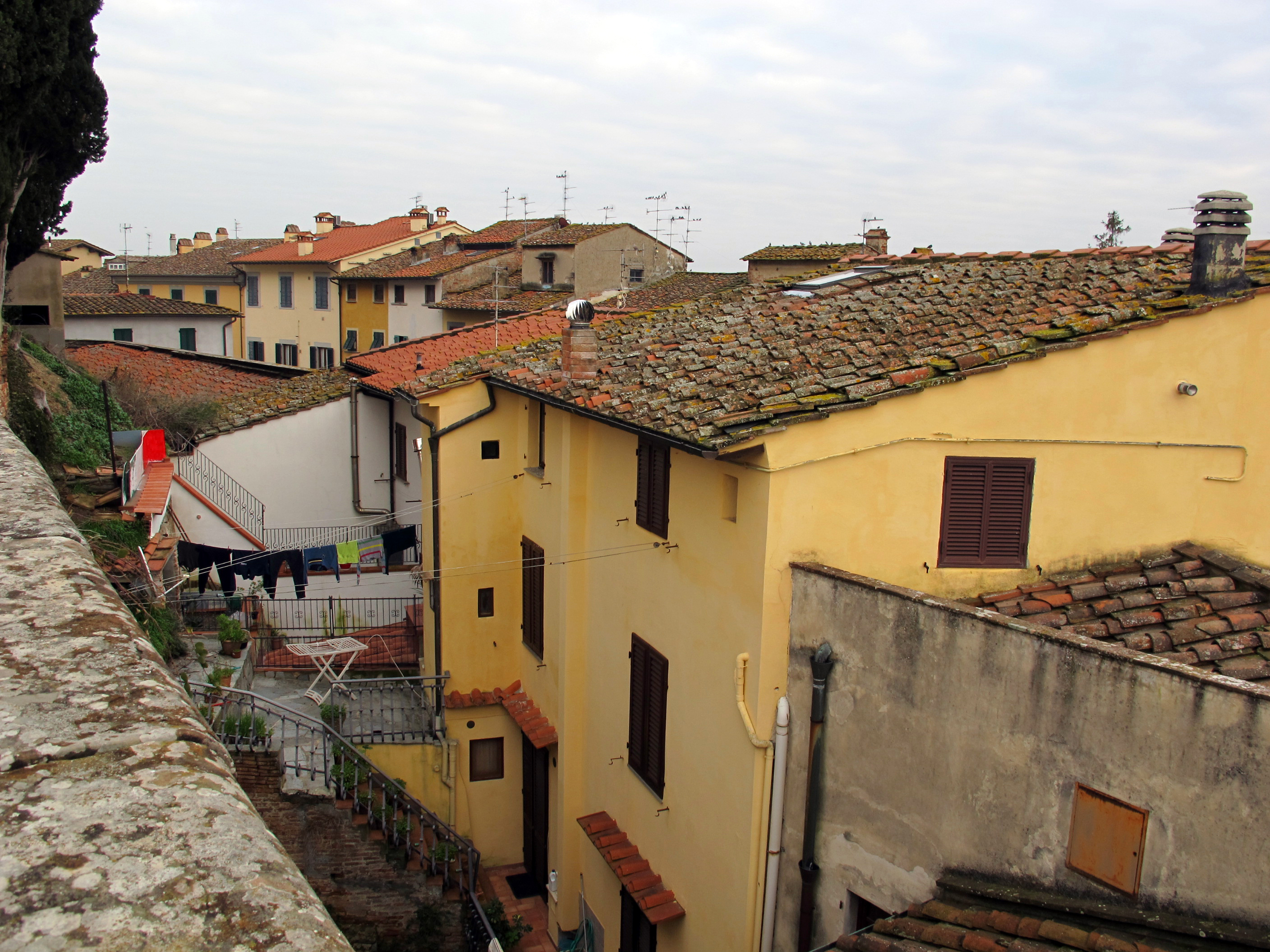
- Panorama of Cerreto Guidi

- Location within Italy Location within Tuscany
- Coordinates: 43°46′N 10°53′E
- Country: Italy
- Region: Tuscany
- Metropolitan city: Florence (FI)

Government
  - Mayor: Simona Rossetti

Area
  - Total: 49.32 km^{2} (19.04 sq mi)
- Elevation: 123 m (404 ft)

Population (30 June 2017)
  - Total: 10,993
  - Density: 222.9/km^{2} (577.3/sq mi)
- Demonym: Cerretesi
- Time zone: UTC+1 (CET)
  - Summer (DST): UTC+2 (CEST)
- Postal code: 50050
- Dialing code: 0571
- Website: Official website

Cerreto Guidi is a comune (municipality) in the Metropolitan City of Florence in the Italian region Tuscany, located about 30 kilometres (19 mi) west of Florence.

Cerreto Guidi borders the following municipalities: Empoli, Fucecchio, Lamporecchio, Larciano, San Miniato, Vinci.
