= Uzzano =

- Comune
- Comune di Uzzano
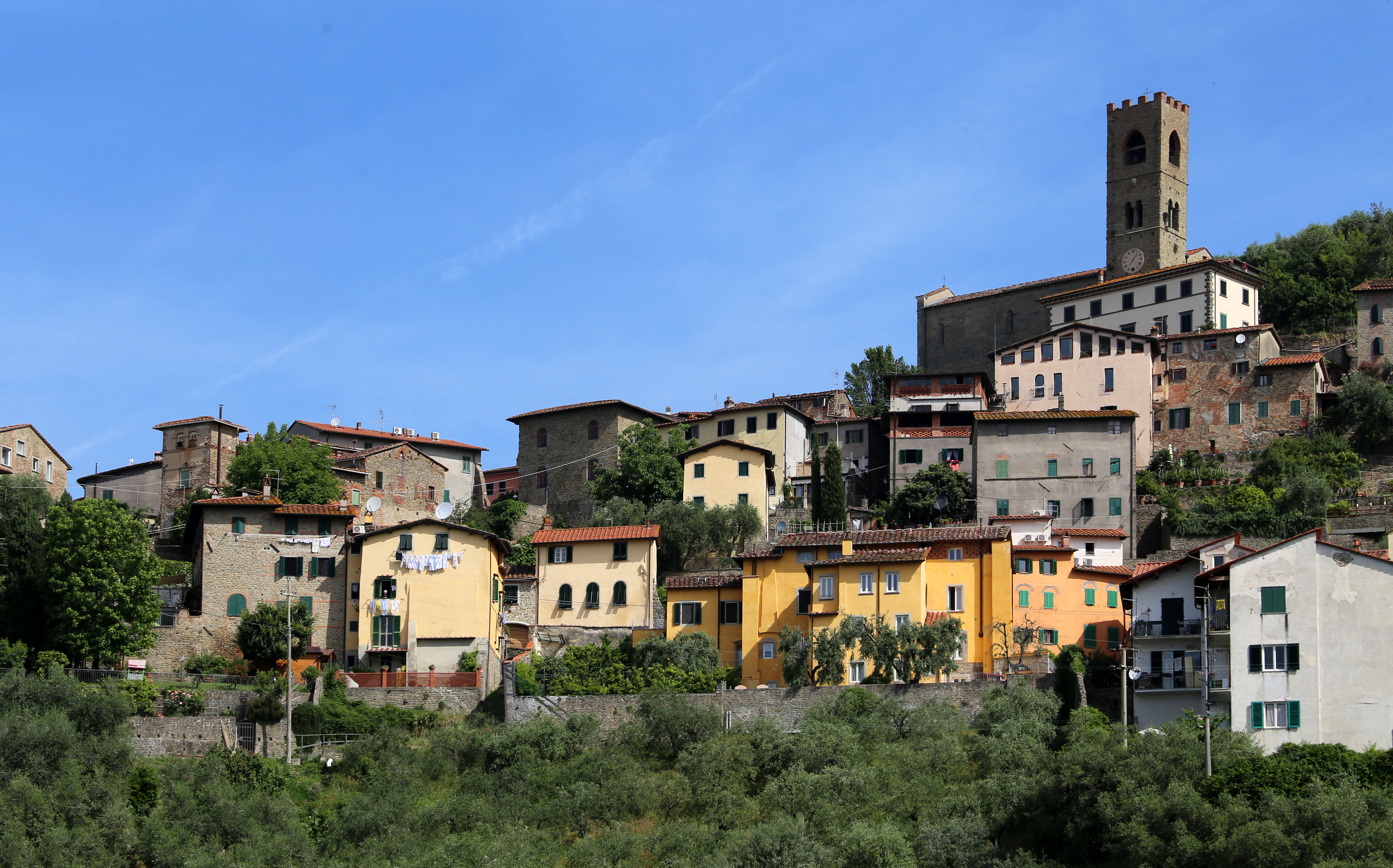
- Uzzano Castello

- Coat of arms

- Location within Italy Location within Tuscany
- Coordinates: 43°53′N 10°43′E
- Country: Italy
- Region: Tuscany
- Province: Province of Pistoia (PT)
- Frazioni: Fornaci, Sant'Allucio, Santa Lucia, Torricchio, Uzzano Castello

Government
  - Mayor: Riccardo Franchi

Area
  - Total: 7.8 km^{2} (3.0 sq mi)
- Elevation: 50 m (160 ft)

Population (31 June 2011)
  - Total: 5,699
  - Density: 730/km^{2} (1,900/sq mi)
- Demonym: Uzzanesi
- Time zone: UTC+1 (CET)
  - Summer (DST): UTC+2 (CEST)
- Postal code: 51010
- Dialing code: 0572
- Patron saint: Saint Martin of Tours
- Saint day: November 11
- Website: Official website

Uzzano is a comune (municipality) in the Province of Pistoia in the Italian region Tuscany, located about 45 kilometres (28 miles) west of Florence and about 15 kilometres (9 mi) southwest of Pistoia.

Uzzano borders the following municipalities: Buggiano, Chiesina Uzzanese, Pescia, Ponte Buggianese.

== History ==
The origin of Uzzano's hilltop settlement dates to the Lombard period, though the first mention of it dates about 1000 AD, when its castle was in the possession of a noble family of Lucca, of Lombard lineage, who were signori of Uzzano and of Montichiari and Vivinaia.

In 1202 the comune gained local autonomy, remaining nevertheless a dependency of Lucca. In the 14th century Uzzano, like other comuni of the Valdinievole, passed under the dominion of Florence, with which it was joined until the unification of Italy, when it was returned to the jurisdiction of Lucca, and the separated by the creation of the province of Pistoia (1928). In 1963, the southern section of Uzzano was separated to form the comune of Chiesina Uzzanese.

== Main sights ==
- Church of Santi Jacopo e Martin (12th-13th centuries). It houses a Romanesque holy water font, a 16th-century baptismal font, a 16th-century wooden pulpit and a Renaissance statue attributed to Giovanni della Robbia. Paintings include a fresco cycle of the Florentine School and a 15th-century fresco attributed to Neri di Bicci. A survey from 1896 also notes canvases by Alessandro Bardelli and Alessio Germignani.
- Palazzo del Capitano ("Captain's Palace", 13th-14th centuries), once the communal seat, now housing the municipal archives. It has a hall with a 15th-century fresco with Madonna Enthroned with Child and Saints James and Martin.
- 17th century oratories of Madonna del Canale and St. Anthony of Padua
