= Lamporecchio =

- Comune
- Comune di Lamporecchio
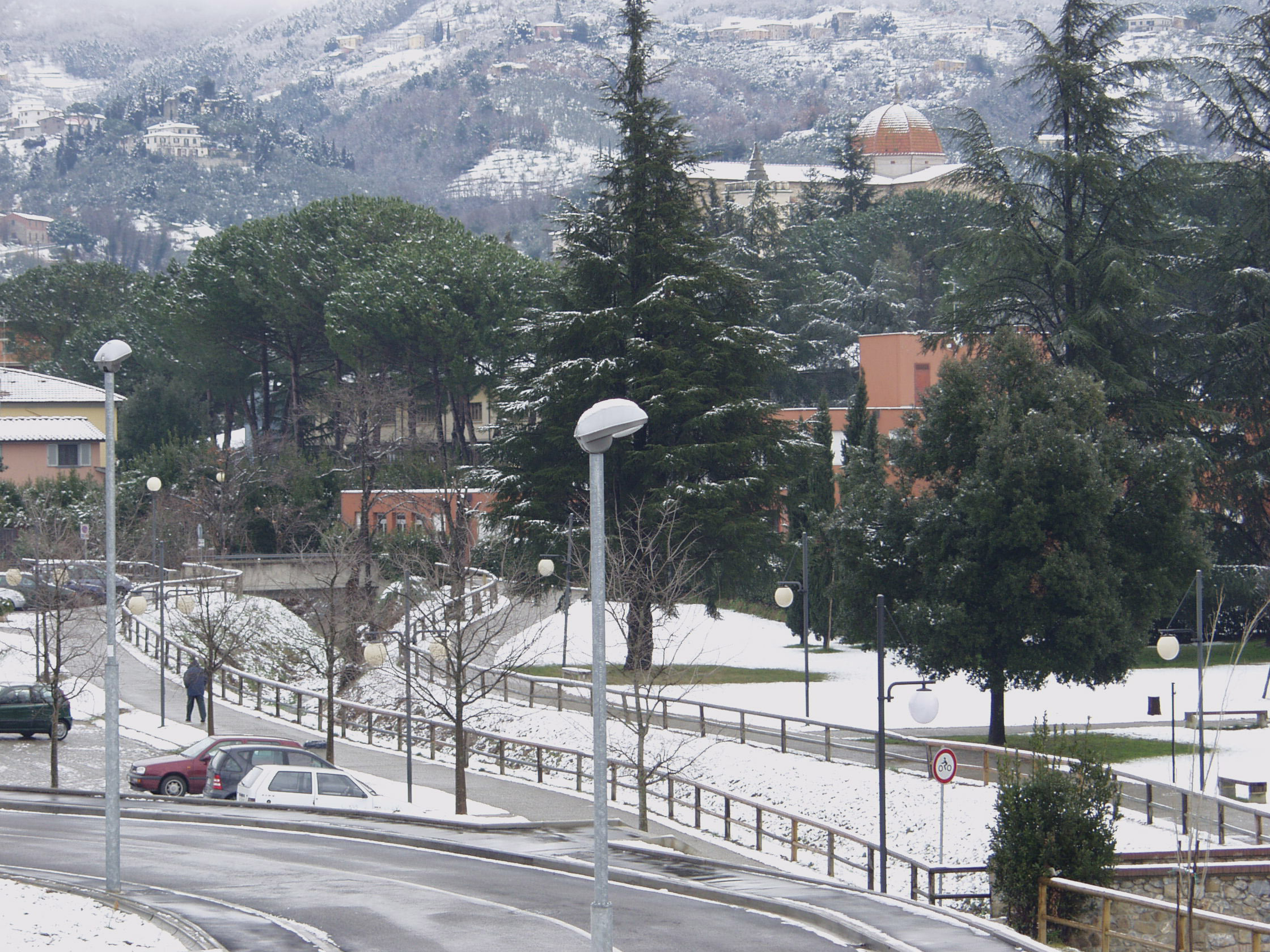
- View of Lamporecchio

- Location within Italy Location within Tuscany
- Coordinates: 43°49′N 10°54′E
- Country: Italy
- Region: Tuscany
- Province: Province of Pistoia (PT)
- Frazioni: Borgano, Cerbaia, Collececioli, Fornello, Mastromarco, Orbignano, Papone, Porciano, San Baronto, Spicchio, Papiano

Government
  - Mayor: Elisa Meacci (Dive Party)

Area
  - Total: 22.25 km^{2} (8.59 sq mi)
- Elevation: 56 m (184 ft)

Population (31 August 2017)
  - Total: 7,524
  - Density: 338.2/km^{2} (875.8/sq mi)
- Demonym: Lamporecchiani
- Time zone: UTC+1 (CET)
  - Summer (DST): UTC+2 (CEST)
- Postal code: 51035
- Dialing code: 0573
- Patron saint: Saint Stephen
- Saint day: 26 December
- Website: Official website

Lamporecchio (Italian: [lampoˈrekkjo]) is a comune (municipality) in the province of Pistoia, in the Italian region of Tuscany, located about 30 kilometres (19 mi) west of Florence and about 13 kilometres (8 mi) south of Pistoia, 15 kilometres (9 mi) east of Montecatini Terme, and 4 kilometres (2.5 mi) west of Vinci.

Lamporecchio is the birthplace of Francesco Berni, a poet. From here started its ascent as one of the most important noble families of Tuscany, the Rospigliosi, which later moved to Pistoia and Rome, reaching the papacy with Clement IX.

The town is known for the invention of brigidini, which are thin anise flavored wafers, and the berlingozzo, a typical Carnival cake.

Lamporecchio borders the following municipalities: Cerreto Guidi, Larciano, Quarrata, Serravalle Pistoiese, Vinci.

A frazione (hamlet) of Lamporecchio, called San Baronto, was chosen to be a part of 2013 UCI Road World Championships road race.
