= Ponte Buggianese =

- Comune
- Comune di Ponte Buggianese
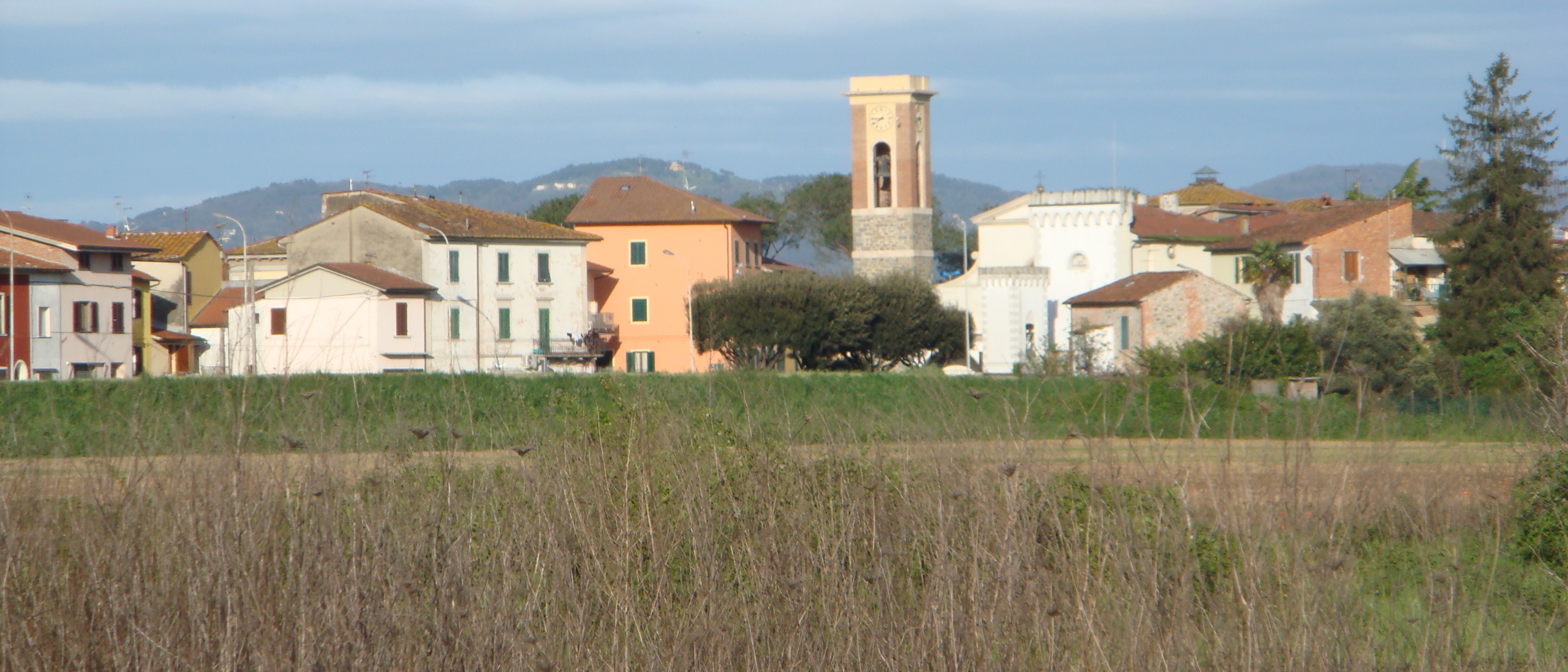
- View of Ponte Buggianese

- Location within Italy Location within Tuscany
- Coordinates: 43°51′N 10°45′E
- Country: Italy
- Region: Tuscany
- Province: Pistoia (PT)
- Frazioni: Albinatico, Anchione, Casabianca, Ponte di Mingo, Fattoria, Vione

Government
  - Mayor: Nicola Tesi

Area
  - Total: 29.53 km^{2} (11.40 sq mi)
- Elevation: 18 m (59 ft)

Population (30 November 2016)
  - Total: 8,856
  - Density: 299.9/km^{2} (776.7/sq mi)
- Demonym: Pontigiani
- Time zone: UTC+1 (CET)
  - Summer (DST): UTC+2 (CEST)
- Postal code: 51019
- Dialing code: 0572
- Patron saint: Madonna del Buon Consiglio
- Saint day: 26 April
- Website: Official website

Ponte Buggianese (Italian pronunciation: [ˈponte buddʒaˈneːze]) is a comune (municipality) in the Province of Pistoia in the Italian region Tuscany, located about 45 kilometres (28 mi) west of Florence and about 20 kilometres (12 mi) southwest of Pistoia.

Ponte Buggianese borders the following municipalities: Buggiano, Chiesina Uzzanese, Fucecchio, Larciano, Montecatini Terme, Monsummano Terme, Pieve a Nievole and Uzzano.
