= Serravalle Pistoiese =

- Comune
- Comune di Serravalle Pistoiese
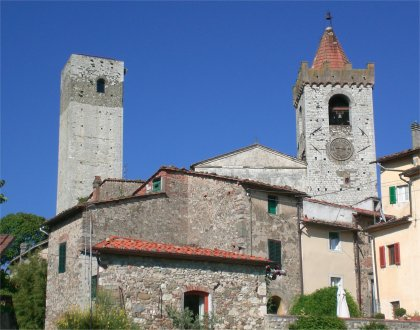
- View of Serravalle Pistoiese

- Coat of arms

- Location within Italy Location within Tuscany
- Coordinates: 43°54′N 10°50′E
- Country: Italy
- Region: Tuscany
- Province: Pistoia (PT)
- Frazioni: Baco, Cantagrillo, Casalguidi, Castellina, Le Ville, Masotti, Pontassio, Ponte alla Stella, Ponte di Serravalle, Serravalle Scalo, Vinacciano

Government
  - Mayor: Piero Lunardi

Area
  - Total: 42.05 km^{2} (16.24 sq mi)
- Elevation: 182 m (597 ft)

Population (31 December 2015)
  - Total: 11,659
  - Density: 277.3/km^{2} (718.1/sq mi)
- Demonym: Serravallini or Terrazzani
- Time zone: UTC+1 (CET)
  - Summer (DST): UTC+2 (CEST)
- Postal code: 51030
- Dialing code: 0573
- Patron saint: Saint Louis of Toulouse
- Saint day: 19 August
- Website: Official website

Serravalle Pistoiese is a comune (municipality) in the Province of Pistoia in the Italian region Tuscany, located about 35 kilometres (22 mi) northwest of Florence and about 8 kilometres (5 mi) southwest of Pistoia.

== History ==
The original settlement consisted of two cones, those of S. Maria and Nievole, the fortress was built by the New Lucchesi in 1302. Casttrum of talking in an old inventory of the assets of the town of Pistoia dated around 1380, this document is listed in the Castrum Serravallis cum walls turribus September muratis circumcirca et cum duabus januis.

== Main sights ==
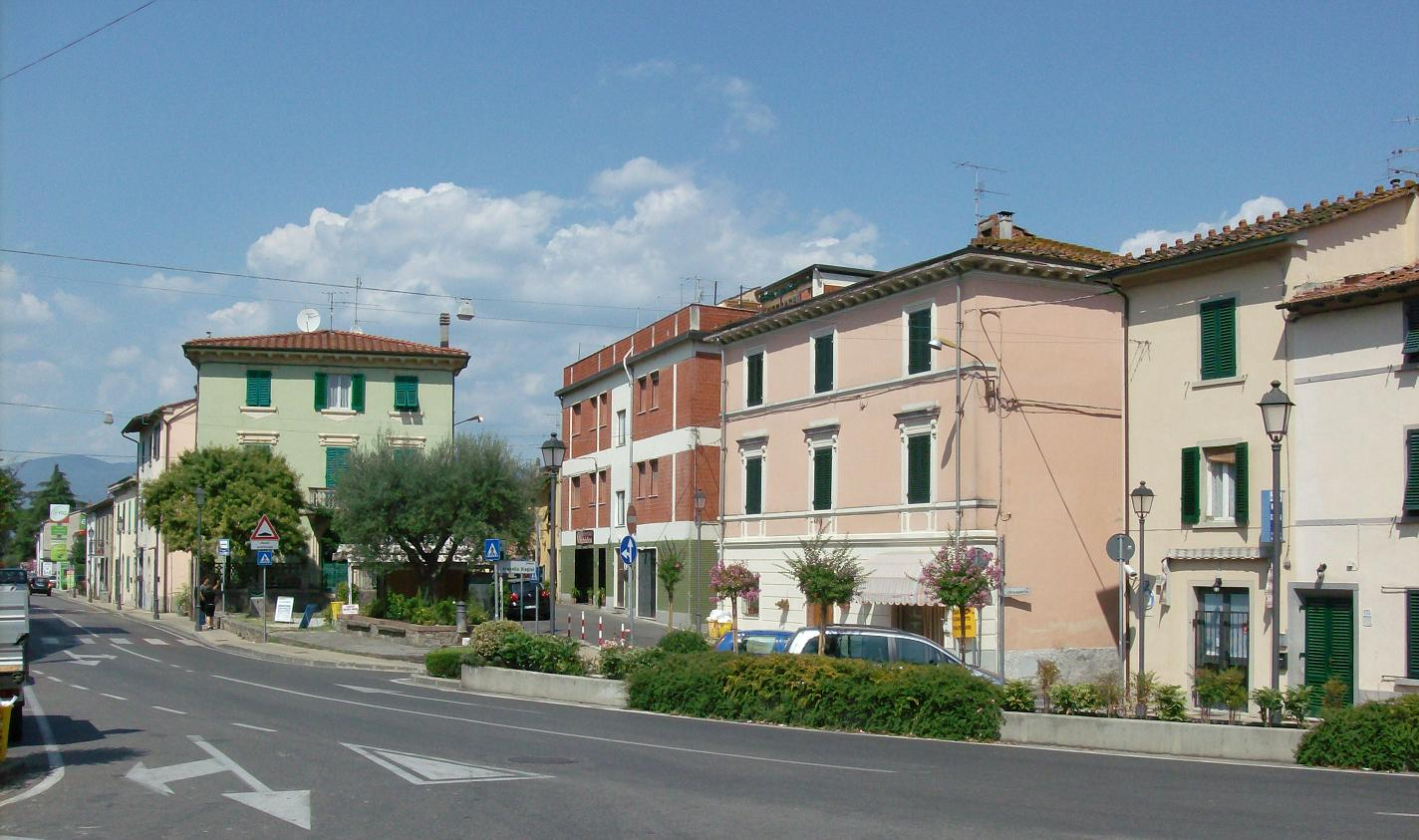
Town centre of Cantagrillo, one of the frazioni of the municipality Serravalle Pistoiese

- Church of San Michele Arcangelo. It houses a 14th-century Miracle of St. Blaise and a triptych with Madonna Enthroned with Child and Saints (1438), by Bartolomeo di Andrea Bocchi.
- Barbarossa (Lombard) Tower
- Church of Santo Stefano
- Oratory of San Rocco e San Sebastiano, with fragment of 14th-century fresco decoration
- Church of St. Peter, in the frazione of Casalguidi. It houses some 16th-century paintings.
- Rocca Nuova, or Rocca di Castruccio, a medieval castle.

== Twin towns ==
Serravalle Pistoiese is twinned with:

- Uzerche, France
- Grafenwörth, Austria
