= Province of Pistoia =

Province of Italy

Coordinates: 43°56′N 10°55′E

Province of Pistoia Provincia di Pistoia (Italian)
- Province
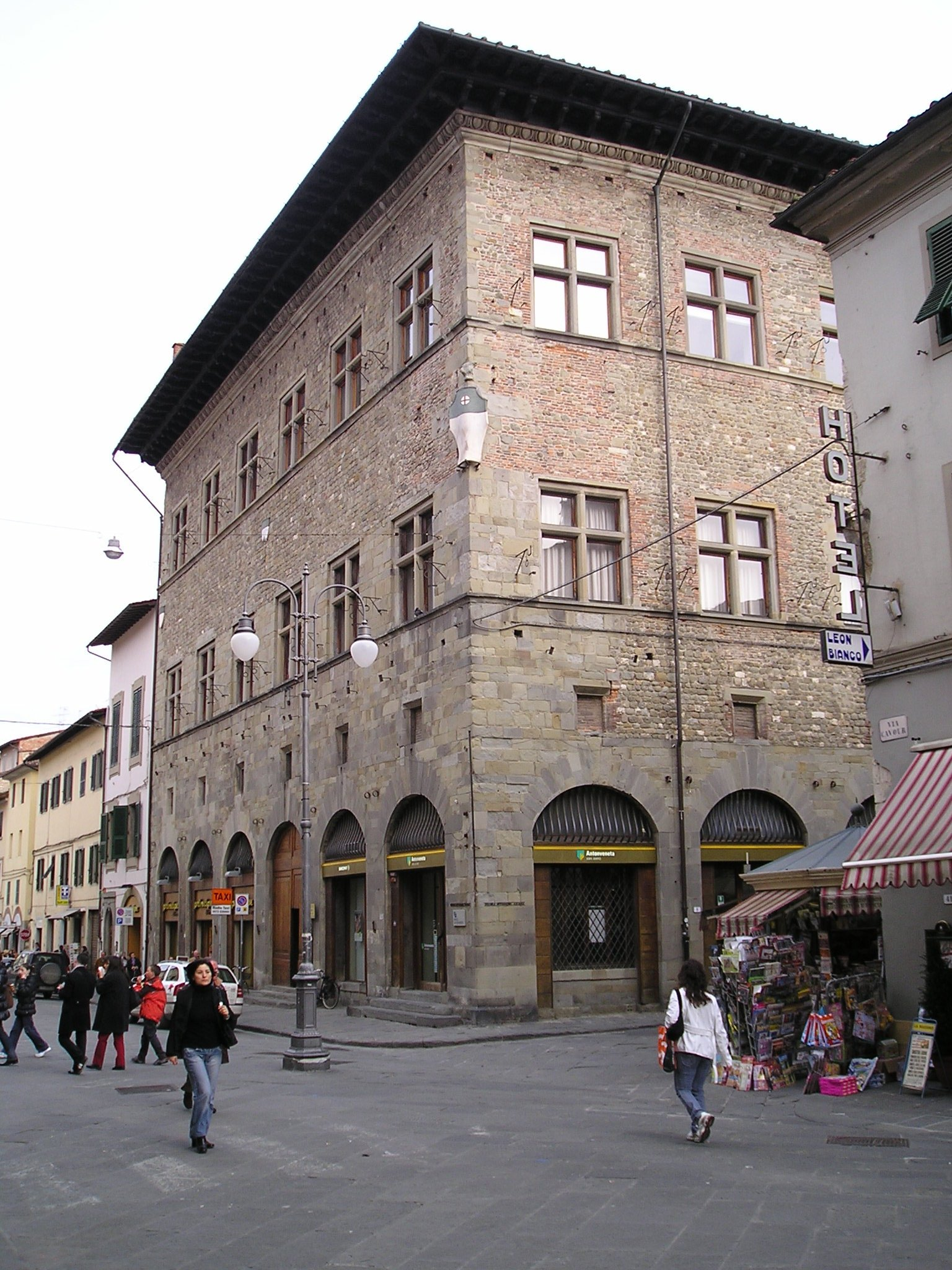
- Palazzo Panciatichi in Pistoia, the provincial seat

- Coat of arms

- Location of the Province of Pistoia in Italy
- Country: Italy
- Region: Tuscany
- Capital(s): Pistoia
- Municipalities: 20

Government
  - President: Luca Marmo

Area
  - Total: 964.12 km^{2} (372.25 sq mi)

Population (2026)
  - Total: 290,867
  - Density: 301.69/km^{2} (781.38/sq mi)

GDP
  - Total: €7.302 billion (2015)
  - Per capita: €24,986 (2015)
- Time zone: UTC+1 (CET)
  - Summer (DST): UTC+2 (CEST)
- Postal code: 51100
- Telephone prefix: 0573
- Vehicle registration: PT
- ISTAT code: 047

The Province of Pistoia (Italian: provincia di Pistoia) is a province in the region of Tuscany in Italy. It is a landlocked province with the seat at the city of Pistoia. It has a population of 290,867 in an area of 964.12 square kilometres (372.25 sq mi) across its 20 municipalities.

== History ==
The region had Gallic, Ligurian and Etruscan settlements before being captured by the Roman Empire in the sixth century BCE. It was followed by bishopric reign in the fifth century CE. It later rose to prominence in the early Middle Ages under the Lombards. It became a free city in 1177 CE and became part of Florence in the 16th century CE and the later the Kingdom of Italy. Pistols were manufactured originally here in the 16th century and the name itself is said to have been derived from Pistoia.

== Geography ==
Pistoia is a landlocked province located in northeastern Tuscany, stretching from the Apennine ridges in the north to the Arno river and Ombrone plains in the south. It borders the provinces of Florence, Prato, Lucca, Modena, and Bologna. Spread over an area of 964 km^{2} (372 sq mi), it encompasses 20 comuni, including the provincial capital, Pistoia. The terrain ranges from valley plains to mountain peaks reaching 1,600 m (5,200 ft) in the Apennines. The region includes various natural reserves located in the Pistoia mountains including Abetone and Val de Luce. The city of Pistoia is roughly 40 kilometres (25 mi) away from both Lucca and Florence.

== Demographics ==
As of 2026, the population is 290,867, of which 48.7% are male, and 51.3% are female. Minors make up 13.8% of the population, and seniors make up 27.0%.

Historical population

Year	Pop.	±%
1861	148,553	—
1871	162,864	+9.6%
1881	166,457	+2.2%
1901	192,859	+15.9%
1911	206,382	+7.0%
1921	214,184	+3.8%
1931	209,795	−2.0%
1936	211,150	+0.6%

Year	Pop.	±%
1951	219,582	+4.0%
1961	232,999	+6.1%
1971	254,335	+9.2%
1981	264,995	+4.2%
1991	264,622	−0.1%
2001	268,503	+1.5%
2011	287,866	+7.2%
2021	289,414	+0.5%

Source: ISTAT

=== Immigration ===
As of 2025, immigrants make up 13.7% of the total population. The 5 largest foreign countries of birth are Albania, Romania, Morocco, China, and Nigeria.

== Government ==
=== Municipalities ===
The province has 20 municipalities:

- Abetone Cutigliano
- Agliana
- Buggiano
- Chiesina Uzzanese
- Lamporecchio
- Larciano
- Marliana
- Massa e Cozzile
- Monsummano Terme
- Montale
- Montecatini-Terme
- Pescia
- Pieve a Nievole
- Pistoia
- Ponte Buggianese
- Quarrata
- Sambuca Pistoiese
- San Marcello Piteglio
- Serravalle Pistoiese
- Uzzano

== Economy ==
After the World War II, the mainly agricultural province underwent industrial development. However, the province was amongst the ones with the lowest income per capita in Tuscany due to high poverty levels in the 1960s. Pistoia is globally renowned for floriculture and nursery production, with nearly 2,000 plant nurseries producing 25% of Italy’s ornamental plants. The land around the cities of Pistoia and Pescia are popular locations for flower and plant cultivation, and town and commune Quarrata is known for its wood furniture. Manufacturing includes engineering goods, textiles, furniture, and ceramics. Tourism is a key contributor to the economy with several heritage sites, spa resorts, and skiing sites attracting tourists. The province hosts the renowned Giostra dell’Orso, a medieval jousting festival on July 25, honoring St Jacopo with historic pageantry, in Pistoia.

== See also ==
- Basin of Pavana
