= Caio De Cenco =

Italian Brazilian footballer (born 1989)

Personal information
- Date of birth: 5 May 1989 (age 37)
- Place of birth: São Paulo, Brazil
- Height: 1.89 m (6 ft 2 1/2 in)
- Position: Forward

Team information
- Current team: Ilvamaddalena

Senior career*
Years	Team	Apps	(Gls)
2007–2010	Boca S.Lazzaro/Pietri		
2010–2012	Bellaria	55	(19)
2012–2013	Cesena	0	(0)
2012–2013	→ Reggiana (loan)	9	(0)
2013	→ Monza (loan)	14	(5)
2013–2016	Pavia	13	(4)
2014	→ Monza (loan)	10	(3)
2014–2015	→ SPAL (loan)	13	(0)
2015	→ Pontedera (loan)	16	(5)
2015–2016	→ Pordenone (loan)	15	(8)
2016	→ Trapani (loan)	6	(1)
2016–2017	Trapani	13	(1)
2017–2019	Padova	15	(2)
2017–2018	→ Pistoiese (loan)	21	(1)
2018–2019	→ Südtirol (loan)	38	(5)
2019–2020	Pontedera	24	(9)
2020–2021	Feralpisalò	17	(1)
2021	→ Carpi (loan)	22	(5)
2021–2022	Mantova	25	(3)
2022–2023	Ostia Mare	29	(4)
2023–2024	Flaminia	32	(7)
2024-2025	Atletico Uri	?	(12)
2025-	Ilvamaddalena	?	(11)
- * Club domestic league appearances and goals as of 5 may 2026

Caio De Cenco (born 5 May 1989) is an Italian Brazilian professional footballer who plays as a forward for Italian Serie Eccellenza club Ilvamaddalena in Sardinia.

== Career ==
=== Boca ===
Born in São Paulo, Brazil, De Cenco started his Italian career at Emilia-Romagna club Boca San Lazzaro, in Italian Serie D, the fifth division (from 1978 to 2014; Serie C refound in 2014) and top division of amateur (non fully professional) football. He played 15 games in 2007–08 Serie D, at age 18. He followed the club relegated to Eccellenza in 2008. In 2009 Boca demerged with San Lazzaro, and merged with Pietri Carpi and Vignola to form Boca Pietri Carpi, which De Cenco followed the demerger and merger to the new club. He scored 14 goals in 2009–10 Serie D. The club folded after relegation back to Eccellenza at the end of season.

=== Cesena ===
In August 2010 De Cenco was signed by Serie A club A.C. Cesena on a free transfer. He was farmed to A.C. Bellaria – Igea Marina in a co-ownership deal for €500 each, along with Alessio Petti. De Cenco spent 2 Serie C2 seasons with the Romagna-based club. In June 2012 Cesena bought back De Cenco also for €500, in 3-year contract, re-joining coach Nicola Campedelli, teammates Daniele Fioretti, Daniele Forte and Marco Mariani. Despite Cesena relegated back to Serie B, De Cenco did not include in the pre-season camp of the Romagna-based side. On 6 July 2012 he was signed by Emilian club Reggiana. On 15 January 2013 De Cenco left for Lombard club Monza. De Cenco scored nil in the first half of the season in Serie C1 and 5 goals in the second half in Serie C2 respectively. In June 2013 De Cenco was sold to Pavia of Serie C1.

=== Pavia ===
De Cenco was signed by another Lombard club Pavia in June 2013 in co-ownership deal for €350,000, as part of the deal that Cesena signed Matteo Zanini for €400,000. He scored 4 goals in the first half of 2013–14 Serie C1 season. On 31 January 2014 De Cenco returned to Monza in temporary deal. Monza finished as the fourth of Group A of 2013–14 Serie C2 season, which qualified to 2014–15 Serie C, while Pavia finished as the least of Group A of 2013–14 Serie C1, however also qualified to Serie C.

On 1 September 2014 he was swapped with Samuele Sereni of SPAL. On 26 January 2015 De Cenco left for Pontedera. In June 2015 Cesena gave up the remain 50% registration rights of De Cenco to Pavia, as well as Pavia gave up the remain 50% registration rights of Fabio Reato to Cesena.

In summer 2015 De Cenco was signed by Pordenone. He scored his first goal for the club on 4 August, in a friendly match.

=== Trapani ===
On 22 July 2016 he was re-signed by Trapani, after a loan in the second half of 2015–16 season.

=== Padova ===
On 8 January 2017 De Cenco was signed by Padova in a 2 1/2-year contract.

=== Pontedera ===
On 29 July 2019, he signed a 2-year contract with Pontedera.

=== Feralpisalò ===
On 1 September 2020 he moved to Feralpisalò on a 2-year contract.

==== Loan to Carpi ====
On 14 January 2021 he joined Carpi on loan.

=== Mantova ===
On 25 August 2021, after his contract with Feralpisalò expired, De Cenco joined to Mantova 1911.

=== Ostia Mare ===
On 3 August 2022, De Cenco moved to Ostia Mare in Serie D.
