= Ferretti (surname) =

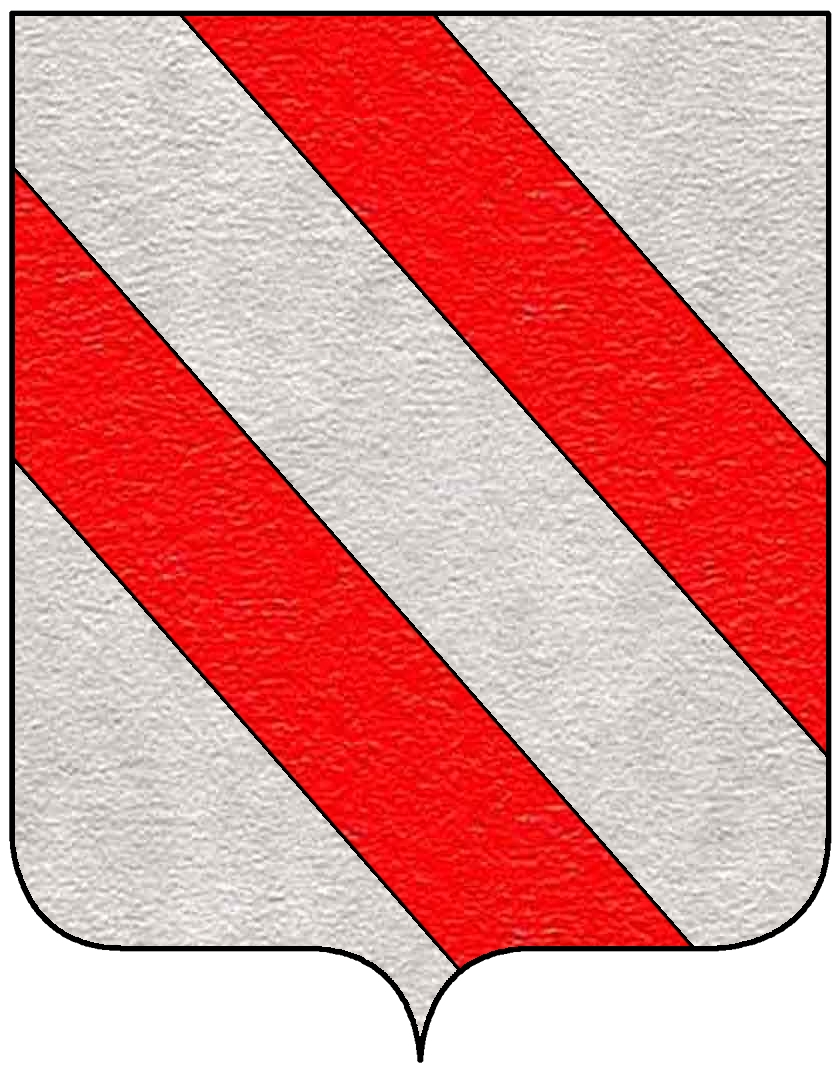
Coat of arms of the Ferretti family

Ferretti is an Italian surname. Notable people with the surname include:

- Alberta Ferretti (born 1950), Italian fashion designer and dressmaker
- Andrea Ferretti (footballer, born 1985), Italian footballer
- Andrea Ferretti (footballer, born 1986), Italian footballer
- Andrée Ferretti (1935–2022), Canadian political figure and author
- Antonio Ferretti (born 1957), Swiss former racing cyclist
- Augustino Chester “Chet” Ferretti (1933–1971), jazz and big band trumpeter
- Daniele Ferretti (born 1986), Italian footballer
- Dante Ferretti (born 1943), Italian production designer, art director and costume designer
- Elena Ferretti (born 1960), Italian Eurobeat and Italo disco singer
- Emerson Ferretti (born 1971), Brazilian former footballer
- Emilio Ferretti (1489–1552), Italian jurist and diplomat
- Fernando Ferretti (1949-2011), Brazilian footballer
- Francesca Ferretti (born 1984), Italian volleyball player
- Gabriel Ferretti (1385-1456), Italian Roman Catholic priest
- Gabriele Ferretti (1795-1860), Italian Catholic cardinal
- Giancarlo Ferretti (born 1941), Italian former bicycle racing team manager
- Gian Pietro Ferretti (died 1557), Bishop of Milos and Lavello
- Giovanni Ferretti (footballer) (1940-2007), Italian footballer
- Giovanni Ferretti (composer) (1540-1609), Italian composer
- Giovanni Domenico Ferretti (1692-1768) Italian painter
- Giovanni Lindo Ferretti (born 1953), Italian singer-songwriter, composer and author
- Giuseppe Milesi Pironi Ferretti (1817-1873), Italian Catholic cardinal
- Johad Ferretti (born 1994), Italian footballer
- Lando Ferretti (1895-1977), Italian journalist, politician and sports administrator
- Luca Ferretti (born 1983), Italian footballer
- Marisa Ferretti Barth (1931–2021), Canadian senator
- Massimiliano Ferretti (born 1966), Italian former water polo player
- Pope Pius IX, born Giovanni Maria Mastai Ferretti (1792-1878), Italian pope of the Catholic Church
- Raimondo Ferretti (1650-1719), Archbishop of Ravenna and Bishop of Recanati e Loreto
- Ricardo Ferretti (born 1954), Mexican football manager
- Stefano Onorato Ferretti (1640–1720), 138th Doge of the Republic of Genoa and king of Corsica
- Vasco Ferretti (born 1935), Italian novelist, historian, professor and journalist

== In fiction ==
- Louis Ferretti, a character from the Stargate media franchise
- Renato Ferretti, called René, a main character from the Italian TV series Boris and the following film

== Other uses ==
- Pier Giorgio Ferretti, pseudonym used by Giuliano Biagetti, Italian director and screenwriter
