= Reato =

Reato is an Italian surname. Notable people with the surname include:

- Fabio Reato (born 1993), Italian footballer
- Tommaso Reato (born 1984), Italian rugby union player

== See also ==
- Reto
