= Fioretti (surname) =

Fioretti is an Italian surname. Notable people with the surname include:

- Daniele Fioretti (born 1990), Italian footballer
- Francesco Fioretti (born 1993), Italian ice dancer
- Robert Fioretti (born 1953), American politician

== See also ==
- Little Flowers of St. Francis (Italian: Fioretti di San Francesco), florilegium on the life of Saint Francis of Assisi
