= Marco Almaviva =

Italian painter

Marco Almaviva (born 23 January 1934) is an Italian painter.

== Early life and training ==
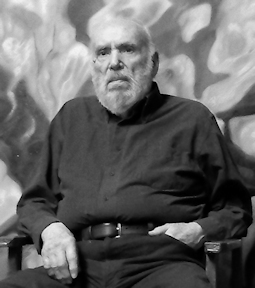
Marco Almaviva in his studio. 14 July 2023

Almaviva was born in Novi Ligure (Province of Alessandria, Italy). His father, the sculptor Armando Vassallo, Francesco Messina's first teacher and close friend, was one of the most representative of the small circle of artists who have distinguished themselves for their research potential and originality, representing alternative lines of research with respect to the dominant models in the Italian artistic culture of the Thirties. In contrast to the directives of fascism, Vassallo rejected the dominant classicism in the field of sculpture. He was the protagonist of a particular artistic journey: from his early experiences in liberty and art déco, through a significant intervention of stylistic reduction, in the mid-twenties he reached original solutions, characterized by the convergence of floral linearism with the volumetric essentiality attributable to the instances of Novecento Italiano. This research perspective led Vassallo to join the avant-garde group "Sintesi", inspired by the principles of Second Futurism. By the time Vassallo moved from Genoa to Novi Ligure, he had taken part in two Venice Biennals (1928 and 1930), and the 1925 Exposition des Arts Décoratifs in Paris; he had established relationships and worked with major exponents of art and culture of his time, from Adolfo Wildt to Arturo Martini, from Edgar Wood to Rino Valdameri, Giovanni Pastrone and Gabriele D'Annunzio,-drawing one of the posters of the blockbuster Cabiria. Anyway, Vassallo had already begun to express dissent against the fascist regime as far as art was concerned, openly criticizing its leaders, with his consequent exclusion from the public exhibition circuit. One of Vassallo's last presences in an official exhibition was in September 1933, together with Arturo Martini, with whom he shared the urgent need to renew Italian sculpture and art.

The dramatic events in his father's life led Marco Almaviva to have a technical-scientific education, far from the world of art. His artistic interests began to take shape in the late 1950s when he started frequenting the Brera environment in Milan, also to gain a deeper understanding of his father's artistic history and work. This initial need became one of the primary motivations for an unvarnished analysis of the art world, founded on a critical approach towards artistic officialdom, a characteristic that would shape the entire career of Marco Almaviva. In this perspective, he came into contact with Francesco Messina, spending time in his studio and dealing in particular with the interest that, at that time, the Sicilian sculptor had shown for new materials. In the early 1960s, in Milan, Almaviva is in contact with Peppino Ghiringhelli of the “Il Milione” gallery. He knows Carlo Carrà, Dino Buzzati and the avant-garde circles. In the mid-1960s, he meets Giorgio Kaisserlian, a fundamental reference for Lucio Fontana’s work.

=== Kaisserlian's paradox: an infeasible scenario ===
The meeting with Kaisserlian (1965) had a crucial impact on Almaviva's artistic choices. The Milanese critic introduced Almaviva to the revolutionary consequences of Fontana's Spatialism. Fontana had brought about a radical transformation with the act of tearing the canvas, particularly in works like "Expectations," which eliminated the traditional two-dimensional foundation of painting. As Kaisserlian clarified, this rupture in the support structure meant that there was no longer another surface or "reserve" on which to continue painting. To persist as a painter would have implied working without the canvas, an unfeasible and paradoxical solution -attempting to create an "oil on canvas" without the flat support on which to apply the paint. The concept of an "oil without having the plane/canvas" explicitly reveals the revolutionary scope of Fontana's gesture, as it effectively nullifies the possibility of providing a relevant response to Fontana's breakthrough within the confines of traditional painting. In this regard, Kaisserlian made a significant observation that, despite Fontana's act of eliminating traditional painting, the essence of Spatialism was born from within the realm of painting itself. To move beyond painting, one needed to confront and engage directly with the medium, passing through the canvas. This implied that one had to be a painter to effectively express oneself in this context. Considering this perspective, Almaviva chose to stay within the realm of painting, also because he found that a purely formal approach to art did not satisfy him.

== The beginnings and the Tonaltimbrica ==
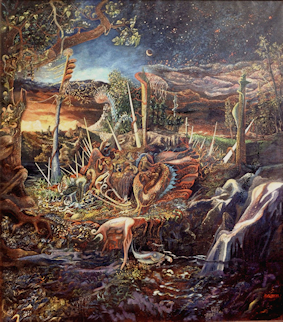
Marco Almaviva, Palpito Primordiale (Primordial Beat) 1967. Oil on canvas, cm. 200 x 160 (78.74 x 62.69)

Since its beginnings, Almaviva embraced a vision of art and life that couldn't ignore a fundamental observation, which consists of acknowledging the violence that characterizes the entire natural hierarchy. It is the incessant struggle for survival, the recurring element that pervades, first and foremost, the biological sphere in which human reality is inevitably placed. This was the underlying assumption to which Almaviva referred in all his evaluations concerning everything he had acquired, not only in relation to art but, more generally, in connection to every idea on which to base any possible conception of reality. Consequently, there was a rejection of any conception of existence that aimed to justify a world marked by oppression and suffering. Painting, therefore, became Almaviva's initial response to the drama present in nature to this state of affairs. It became a way to “reorganize one's morality” in terms of bearing witness to the drama present in nature (dominated by Zöe) against all possible mystifications of reality. Based on these premises, he aimed to create a pictorial structure capable of fully visualizing a world in which everything was engulfed by the biological sphere, unable to break free from the primal instincts that dominate in nature. For this purpose, in 1967, he developed Tonaltimbrica, a pictorial style whose formal structure is conceived in strict correspondence with the irrepressible biological antagonism that, in Almaviva's conception, characterizes existence. In the same year, he made his debut in Milan, at the Rotonda della Besana, in an exhibition organized by the Centro Verritré, showcasing Palpito Primordiale (Primordial Beat) considered the emblem of the new tonaltimbric sensitivity.

=== Tonaltimbric Style ===
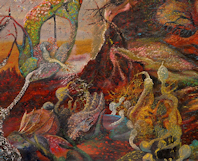
Tonaltimbric style. Marco Almaviva, Albareda (detail) 1968. Oli on canvas, cm. 80 x 120 (81.5 x 47.24 inches)

The Tonaltimbrica was presented as "a two-dimensional painting in a single figurative system." Stylistically, it is characterized by the extreme reduction of its two constituent elements: on one hand, the "tonal" element that outlines the masses in the background of the painting using a color base that defines spaces through variations in tone within a uniform chromatic range; on the other hand, the "timbric" sign, consisting of the relief texture of pure color that structures the tonal masses in the background of the picture. It is through the interaction of these two distinct components (tonal+timbric) that a representation is achieved that is "rough and poignant," "able to make one feel the struggle and drama that continuously unfold at every level of life."

== The birth of Filoplastica ==
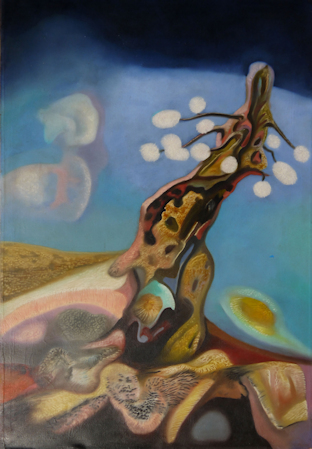
Marco Almaviva, Fioritura (Flowering) 1971. Oil on canvas, cm. 130 x 90 (51.18 x 35.43 inches)

In 1969, Almaviva moved to Genoa, where he founded the Amaltea Gallery, a documentation center for his work. In 1971, the aggressive and sharp code of Tonaltimbrica transformed into the soft filament of Filoplastica. Almaviva's new artistic solution was an expression of a new research necessity that, while not denying the initial denunciation against the arrogance of nature, aimed at a broader vision in which to reconsider reality. The theoretical possibilities for such an operation were already implicit in Tonaltimbrica since it regarded the natural context, albeit in its undeniable evidence, as an intermediate reality within a world that needed to be further investigated. However, this operation wouldn't have involved any metaphysical escape towards a paradisiacal reality as compensation for suffering in nature. Almaviva's pictorial investigation remained internal to the matter itself. In the representation of Filoplastica, the dynamics of biological reality and the drama of life are reinterpreted as if they were epidermal manifestations, similar to germinations or efflorescences, of a primordial material substrate.

=== The pictorial structure of Filoplastica ===
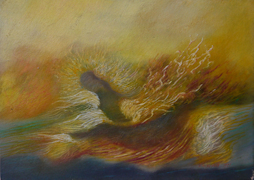
Marco Almaviva, Anelito (Yearning) 1971. Oil on chipboard, cm. 25 x 35 (9.84 x 13.78 inches)

The new conception of Filoplastica entails a different organization of the pictorial space. The previous significance of Tonaltimbrica, sharp and penetrating, took on the appearance of a filament, thin and sinuous, which immerses itself in the basic chromatic layer of the painting. Filoplastica represents a stylistic inversion of the Tonaltimbrica components: the timbral mark of pure colour becomes a chromatic line characterised by changes in tone that, consequently, also involve the background, which, in its initial application, unlike Tonaltimbrica, stands out for its uniformity. The interpenetration between the filament and the colour base of the painting bestows upon the representation the characteristics of a plastic, impalpable, and luminous form, conceived by Almaviva as the expression of that primordial matter that he aims to investigate, despite its inherent incomprehensibility.

== Filoplastica as research ==
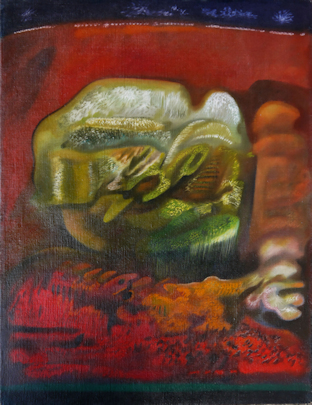
Marco Almaviva, M Nucleus 1980. Oil on canvas, cm. 130 x 100 (51.18 x 39.37 inches)

During the 1970s, he gave form to 35 solo exhibitions in various Italian cities, characterized by the filoplastic research. In 1979, he moved to Borgo a Buggiano, Tuscany, where he continued his research activity, completely independent of established artistic currents and critics. In the early 1980s, he shaped two fundamental painting cycles, "Forms from the Ptolemaic World" and "The Matter of Limbs," which emphasize the crystalline and impalpable matter that constitutes the hallmark of Filoplastica, delving into the aesthetic values connected with the nature of his research. This was also done with the aim of not being confused in the prevailing atmosphere of the "return to painting" movement that emerged in the early 1980s. Almaviva has consistently asserted the Tonaltimbica and Filoplastica's intrinsic originality, given the close correspondence between their defining poetic principles and their unprecedented formal solutions. Consequently, they represent a significant expansion of the field of knowledge, whose boundaries of innovation were once deemed so narrow as to suggest the inevitable exhaustion of painting.

=== Painting beyond Flatness ===
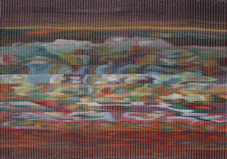
Archetype series. Marco Almaviva, Lineare (Linear) PBF22, 2021, cm. 53 x 83 (20.87 x 32.68 inches)

In line with the spirit of inquiry that characterises his work, Almaviva deemed it necessary to address the issue of tearing the canvas, which had eliminated the very possibility for painting to exist as such, precisely because its fundamental condition, flatness, had been irreparably destroyed through Fontana's intervention. In 1965, following his encounter with Kaisserlian, Almaviva conceived a solution corresponding to the paradox formulated by the Milanese critic: a painting that would form independently of any pre-established surface, as a more pertinent response to the revolutionary turn of Spatialism. The definitive realisation occurred in 2019 when Almaviva produced the first artefacts (the Archetypes and the Rectoverso), expressions of a new form of painting that, in its constitutive procedure, precedes the formation of the support. As the philosopher Carmelo Strano wrote, Almaviva retained the "obsession for surpassing the canvas medium," that does not pass through the Fontanian yoke nor "the existential exasperations of Piero Manzoni [...] His 'Archetypes', always ideally children of Filoplastica, are paintings that have eluded the canvas while still determining a framework.” The "Painting beyond Flatness" project, conceived in 2020 by Almaviva himself, aims to investigate all the consequences resulting from the Rectoverso (corresponding to an "oil on canvas without the canvas to paint on") in relation to the dynamics of modernism that led to the so-called "abandonment of painting." In this regard, given the centrality that flatness assumes in this context, the production of the Rectoverso structurally fits into the path that has characterised painting as a materially constituted procedure, freeing itself from any potential denotative function. From this perspective, the new research, precisely because it has made possible the realisation of an artefact corresponding to an oil on canvas whose execution did not rely on canvas or any pre-existing plane, has rendered the painting autonomous from all the constraints that flatness exerted upon it. Consequently, the Rectoverso breaks free from everything that, in terms of compositionality, is subject to the flat surface. It is, therefore, a painting detached from any compositional rules, and it constitutes a work of art "wholly literal" since, by virtue of its own realisation procedure, there is no real distinction between the support, the background, and the painting itself.
