= Marco Mariani =

Marco Mariani may refer to:

- Marco Mariani (footballer) (born 1992), Italian footballer
- Marco Mariani (curler) (born 1968), Italian curler
- Marco Mariani (politician)
- Marco Mariani (actor)
