= Daniele Forte =

Italian professional footballer (born 1990)

Personal information
- Full name: Daniele Antonio Forte
- Date of birth: 7 September 1990 (age 36)
- Place of birth: Foggia, Italy
- Height: 1.86 m (6 ft 1 in)
- Position: Midfielder

Team information
- Current team: Avezzano

Youth career
- Foggia

Senior career*
Years	Team	Apps	(Gls)
2009–2010	Montecchio	30	(2)
2010–2012	Bellaria	60	(5)
2012–2014	Cesena	0	(0)
2013	→ Borgo (loan)	16	(1)
2013–2014	→ Forlì (loan)	12	(1)
2014	→ Foggia (loan)	6	(0)
2014–2015	Bellaria Igea	32	(11)
2015–2016	Lavagnese	36	(8)
2016–2017	Ravenna	30	(10)
2017–2019	Arzignano	57	(11)
2019–2020	Turris	24	(7)
2020–2022	Arzignano	51	(10)
2022	Arezzo	10	(1)
2022–2023	Cjarlins Muzane	18	(2)
2023–	Avezzano	0	(0)
- * Club domestic league appearances and goals as of 7 May 2023

Daniele Antonio Forte (born 7 September 1990) is an Italian professional footballer who plays as a midfielder for Serie D club Avezzano.

== Career ==
Born in Foggia, Apulia, Forte started his career at his hometown club U.S. Foggia, where he was a player in the reserve league in the 2008–09 season. In 2009, he left for Serie D club Real Montecchio, located in Marche. He played 30 games for the relegated club. In 2010, he was signed by professional club A.C. Bellaria – Igea Marina, where he spent 2 seasons with the Romagna club in Lega Pro Seconda Divisione. On 28 May 2012 Forte was signed by Cesena, the major club of the region. The club also signed former Bellaria coach Nicola Campedelli, whom the brother of Cesena president Igor, as well as signing 3 Bellaria team-mate in June 2012, namely Caio De Cenco, Daniele Fioretti and Marco Mariani.

Forte remained in Cesena in the first half of 2012–13 Serie B, however he failed to play any game. He picked no.4 shirt for the first team. On 9 January 2013 Forte and Fioretti were signed by Borgo-a-Buggiano.

On 15 July 2013 Forte left for Forlì. On 14 January 2014 he was signed by Foggia Calcio in another temporary deal. Both clubs qualified for Lega Pro Divisione Unica as the playoffs winner of Group A of 2013–14 season and the 5th of Group B of 2013–14 Lega Pro Seconda Divisione respectively, which the first and second division of Lega Pro (ex–Serie C) merged.

On 13 July 2019, he signed with Serie D club Turris.

On 1 August 2020, he returned to Arzignano. On 17 October 2021, he played his 100 game for Arzignano against Delta Porto Tolle.

On 22 July 2022, Forte moved to Arezzo in Serie D.
