= Francesco Urso =

Italian footballer

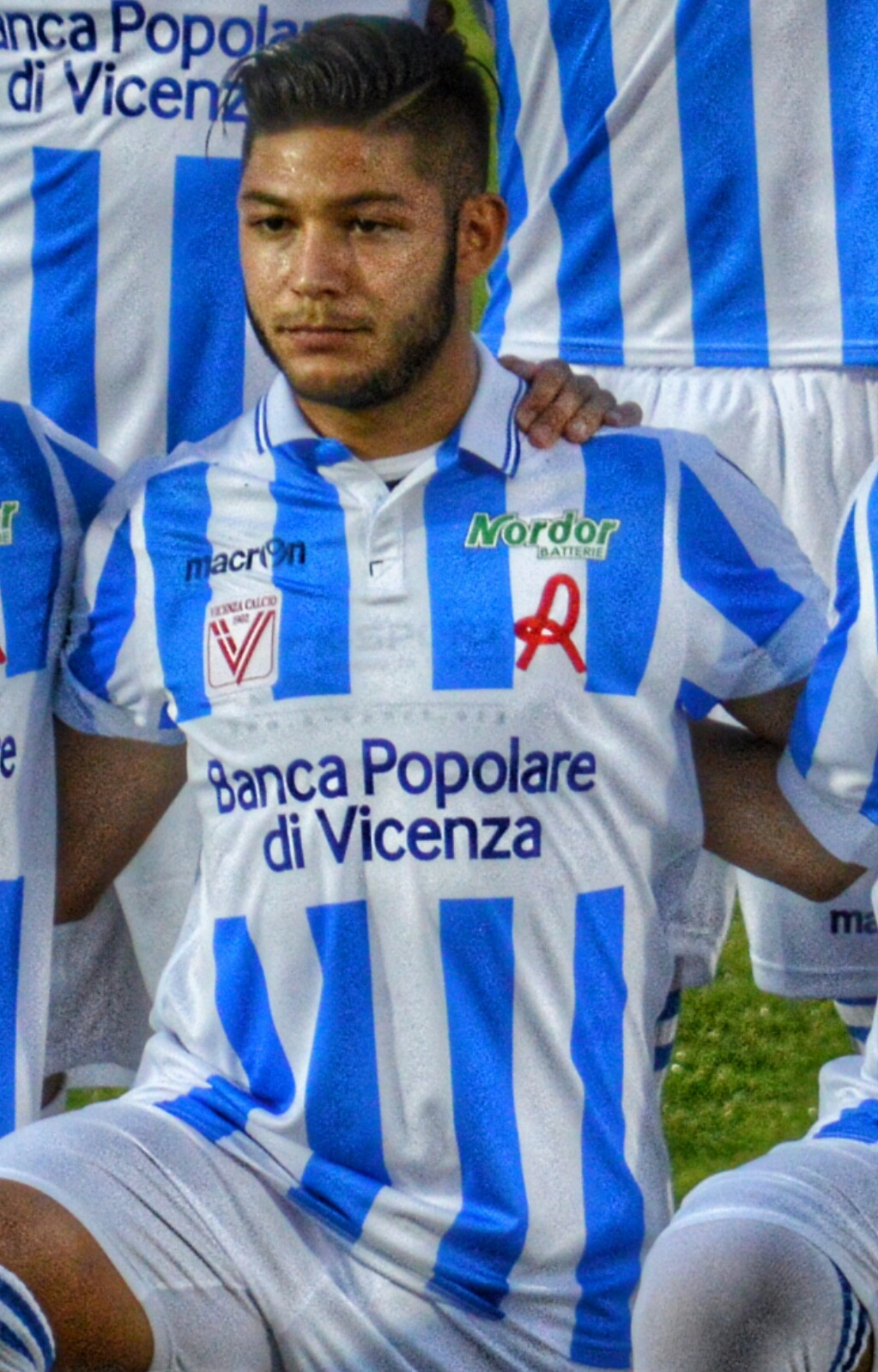
- Francesco Urso in 2016.

Personal information
- Date of birth: 9 June 1994 (age 32)
- Place of birth: Fano, Italy
- Height: 1.75 m (5 ft 9 in)
- Position: Midfielder

Team information
- Current team: Gravina
- Number: 18

Youth career
- Cesena

Senior career*
Years	Team	Apps	(Gls)
2012–2014	Cesena	1	(0)
2012–2013	→ Fano (loan)	27	(2)
2013–2014	→ Santarcangelo (loan)	27	(3)
2014–2017	Vicenza	50	(1)
2015	→ Prato (loan)	17	(2)
2017–2018	Matera	20	(1)
2019	Virtus Entella	6	(0)
2019–2021	Catanzaro	7	(0)
2021	Fano	4	(0)
2022–2023	Fidelis Andria	31	(4)
2023	Torres	12	(0)
2023–2024	Cavese	30	(5)
2024–2025	Reggina	26	(1)
2026–	Gravina	7	(1)
- * Club domestic league appearances and goals as of 15 March 2026

Francesco Urso (born 9 June 1994) is an Italian professional footballer who plays as a midfielder for Serie D club Gravina.

== Career ==
Born in Fano, Marche region, Urso started his career at Romagna club Cesena. He was a player in the under-17 youth team in 2010–11 season. Urso was promoted to reserve team in 2011–12, which he received first team call-up on 10 March 2012. Urso played a friendly match for the first team on 4 April.; he made his competitive debut in the round 36 (in total 38 rounds) of 2011–12 Serie A, as the half-time substitute of Tommaso Arrigoni. Both players made their unofficial Italy U18 debut on 9 May, against the reserve team of Livorno.

On 24 June 2013 Urso was signed by Santarcangelo along with Marco Mariani. Santarcangelo qualified to 2014–15 Serie C as the 5th of Group B of 2013–14 Serie C2.

On 27 June 2014, few days before the closure of 2013–14 financial year, Urso was sold to another third level club Vicenza, with Salvatore Maiorana moved to the Serie A newcomer. Both players were tagged for €2 million transfer fee; Urso signed a 5-year contract. In January 2015 he joined Prato on loan.

On 26 February 2019, he signed with Serie C club Virtus Entella.

On 26 June 2019, Urso signed to Catanzaro until 30 June 2021.

On 1 February 2021 he returned to his hometown club Fano.

On 5 January 2022 he joined Fidelis Andria.

On 30 January 2023, Urso signed with Torres.

== Honours ==
Virtus Entella

- Serie C: 2018–19 (Group A)
