= Matteo Zanini =

Italian footballer

Personal information
- Date of birth: 10 May 1994 (age 32)
- Place of birth: Lodi, Italy
- Height: 1.78 m (5 ft 10 in)
- Position: Full back

Team information
- Current team: Siracusa
- Number: 33

Youth career
- Pavia

Senior career*
Years	Team	Apps	(Gls)
2012–2013	Pavia	19	(0)
2013–2016	Cesena	0	(0)
2013–2014	→ Pavia (loan)	26	(0)
2014–2015	→ Cosenza (loan)	22	(0)
2015–2016	→ Messina (loan)	25	(0)
2016–2017	Akragas	19	(5)
2017–2018	Catanzaro	42	(8)
2018–2019	Lucchese	32	(5)
2019–2021	Reggiana	23	(1)
2021–2022	Paganese	46	(1)
2022–2023	Imolese	28	(4)
2023–2025	AlbinoLeffe	48	(5)
2025–	Siracusa	18	(1)
- * Club domestic league appearances and goals as of 1 May 2026

Matteo Zanini (born 10 May 1994) is an Italian professional footballer who plays as a defender for Serie D club Siracusa.

== Career ==
Born in Pavia, Lombardy, Zanini started his career at hometown club A.C. Pavia. He was the member of the reserve team in 2011–12 season. He made his first team debut during 2012–13 Lega Pro Prima Divisione season. On 6 December 2012 he signed his first fully professional contract. However at the end of season, on 29 June 2013, he was sold to Serie B club Cesena in co-ownership deal for €400,000 in 3-year contract, with Caio De Cenco moved to Pavia also in co-ownership deal for €350,000.

On 18 July 2013 he returned to Pavia along with Cesena team-mate Fabio Reato (whom Cesena signed him in 2012). Pavia finished as the last of Group A in 2013–14 Lega Pro Prima Divisione season, but due to the merger of the prime and second division of Lega Pro, the team did not relegate.

On 20 June 2014 the co-ownership of Zanini, Reato and De Cenco were renewed. In June 2015 Zanini joined Cesena outright.

In summer 2015 Zanini joined Messina.

On 2 August 2016 Zanini joined Akragas in a 2-year contract. On 31 January 2017 Zanini was signed by Catanzaro in a 2 1/2-year deal.

On 17 October 2018, he signed with Lucchese.

On 18 July 2019, he signed with Reggio Audace.

On 1 February 2021 he joined Paganese.

On 17 July 2023, Zanini moved to AlbinoLeffe.
