= Villa Bellavista, Buggiano =

Coordinates: 43.87086°N 10.72891°E

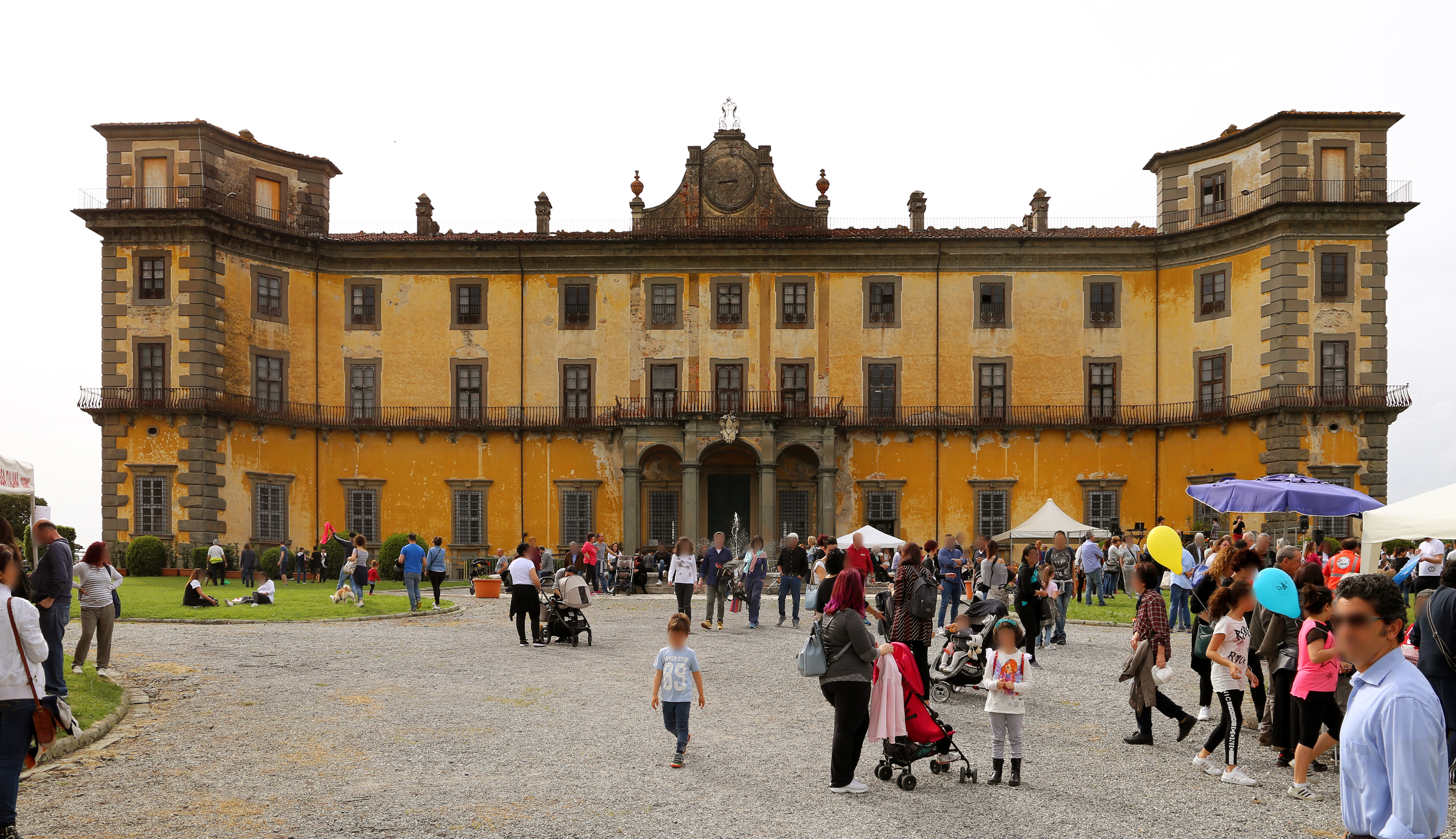
Entrance facade

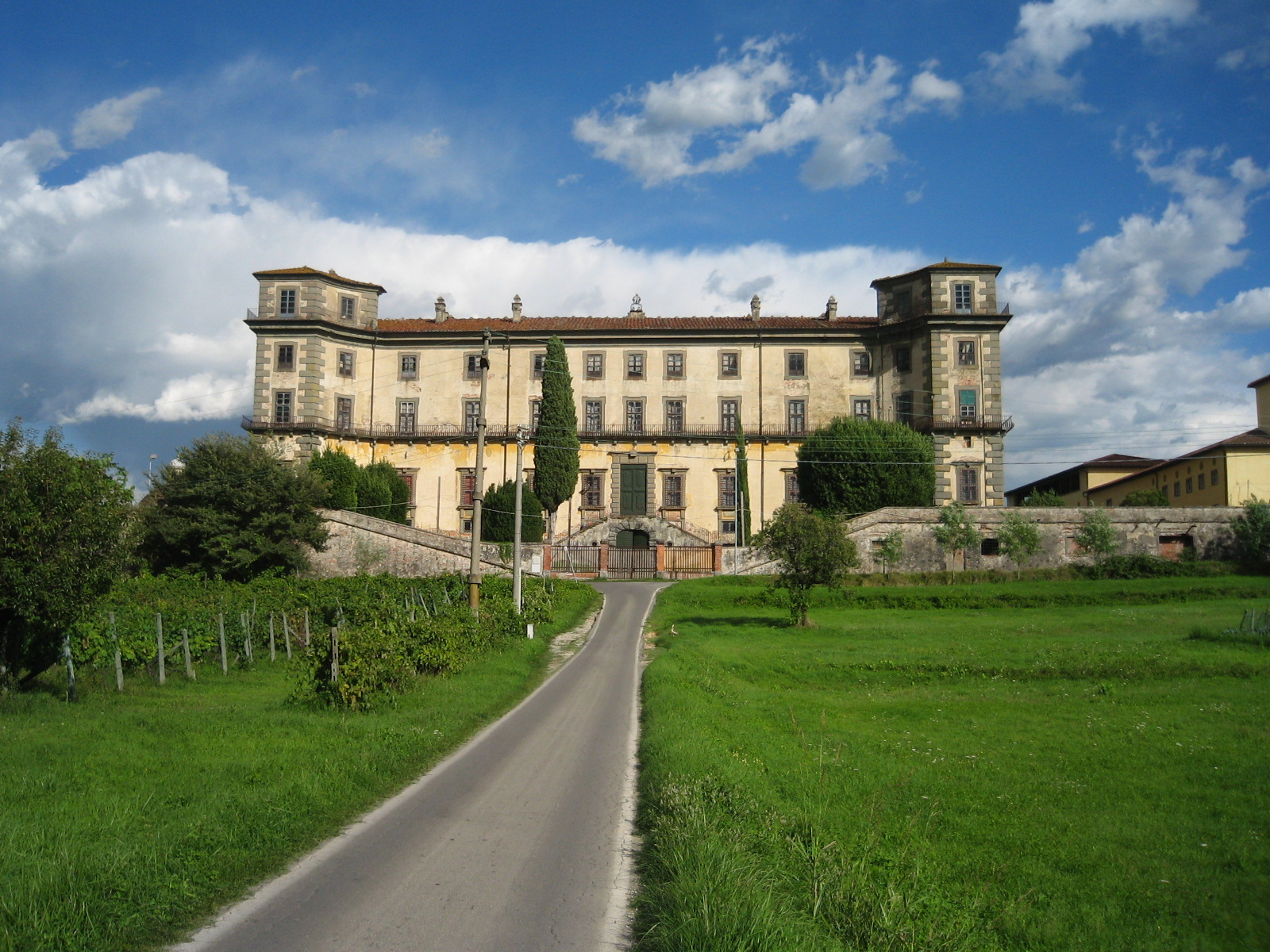
Villa Bellavista garden facade

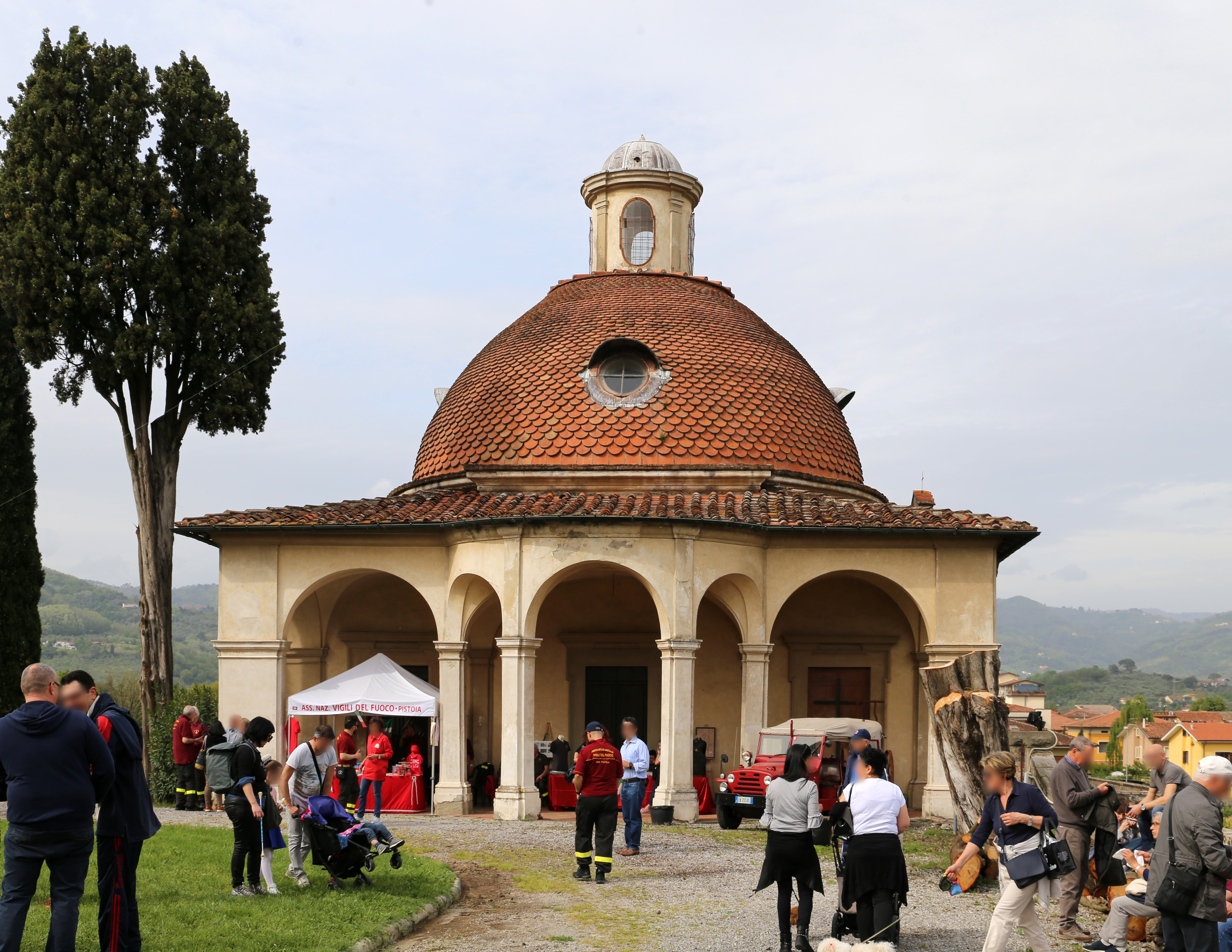
Chapel of the villa

Villa Bellavista is a Baroque-style villa located outside of the town of Buggiano in the province of Pistoia, region of Tuscany, Italy.

== History and description ==
Francesco Feroni (1614–1696) was a merchant from Livorno, who was sent to Amsterdam as a trader and agent for the Florentine senator Lorenzo Buonaccorsi. By 1652 he became an agent for the Ferdinando II de' Medici, Grand-Duke of Tuscany, mediating trade with the English and the Dutch. In 1662, he greatly enriched himself while playing a role for Tuscany in facilitating slave trading between the Protestant countries and Spanish American colonies. By 1672, he had left Amsterdam with most of his riches to return to Tuscany. Back in Tuscany, he gained entrance to the nobility as a senator and Minister of Finance.

With his wealth, in 1673 Feroni purchased this and other lands in Valdinievole. In 1696, Fabio, his son commissioned the present villa from the architect Antonio Maria Ferri. Feroni also built an aqueduct to bring water from the mountains to the valley.

The villa facade has a convex layout with corners resembling castle-towers. The interior was extesnsively frescoed by Pier Dandini, depicting scenes that evoke the defense of the Catholic faith. Niccolò Nannetti frescoed two rooms on the ground floor. Giovan Battista Ciceri created the stucco decoration of the chapel and the panels in the central hall.

Over the past two centuries, the villa has had a number of owners and it no longer contains the original furniture or art collections obtained by the Feronis. The villa is being restored for public use.
