= Colle di Buggiano =

Coordinates: 43.896°N 10.7345°E

Colle di Buggiano is a little medieval village in the Valdinievole. It is a frazione of the comune of Buggiano, in the province of Pistoia, Italy.

== History ==
As suggested by the name, which means "Hill of Buggiano", the village stands on a hill above Buggiano. It is close to the Castle of Buggiano to which it belonged and whose history it shares, and about half-way between Buggiano and Massa e Cozzile. Its origin dates to about the year 500, but the original village was founded a century earlier one kilometre from the present village. The decision to change the location of the village was made for defensive reasons, as the original village was too exposed to enemy raids. During the medieval age Colle di Buggiano became an important rest station along the only viable route between Lucca and Pistoia.

The Knights of Malta founded a church here, still recognizable today by the big red cross located in front of the entrance.

Colle and its neighborhood has a population of about 300 people.

== Gallery ==
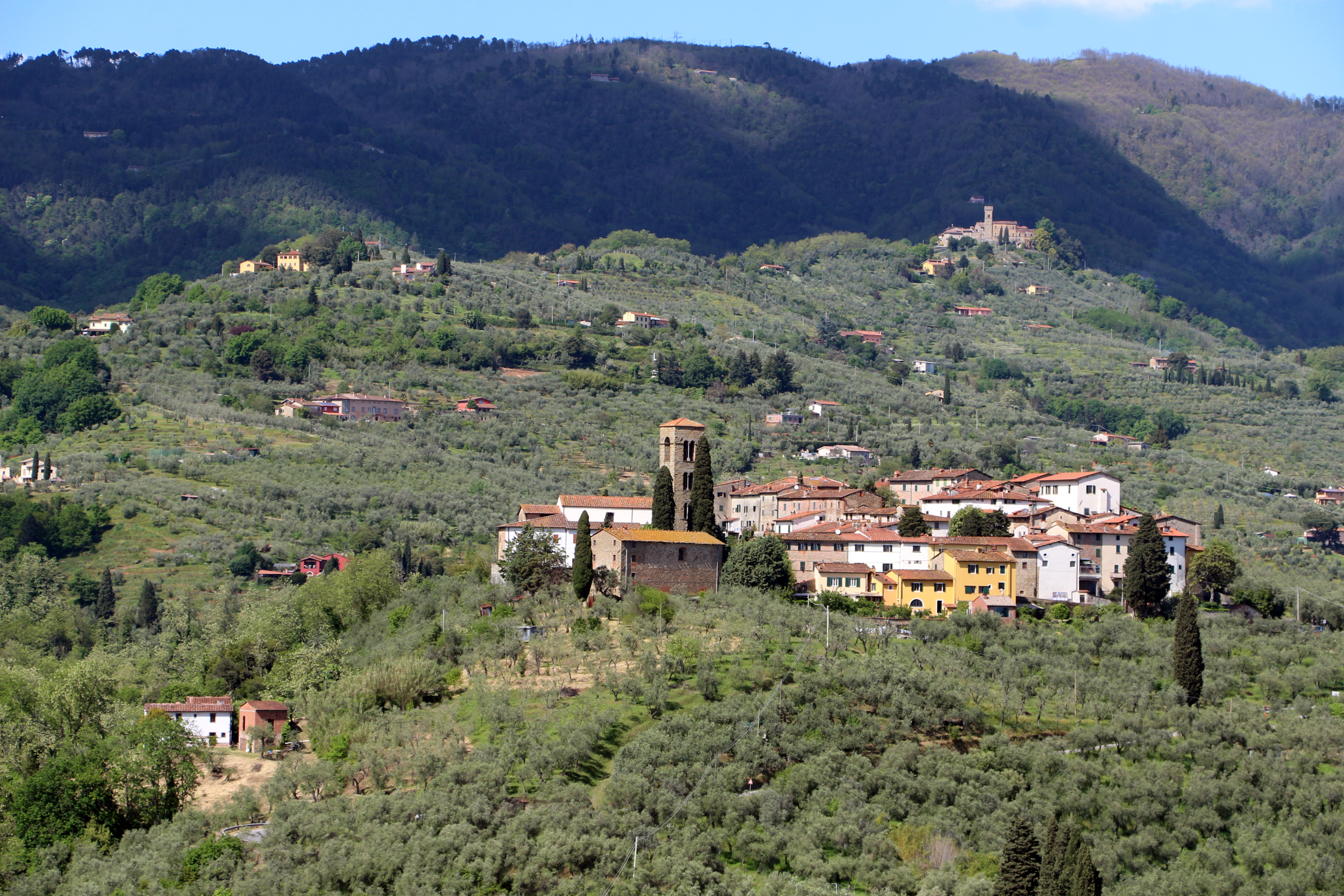
Colle di Buggiano

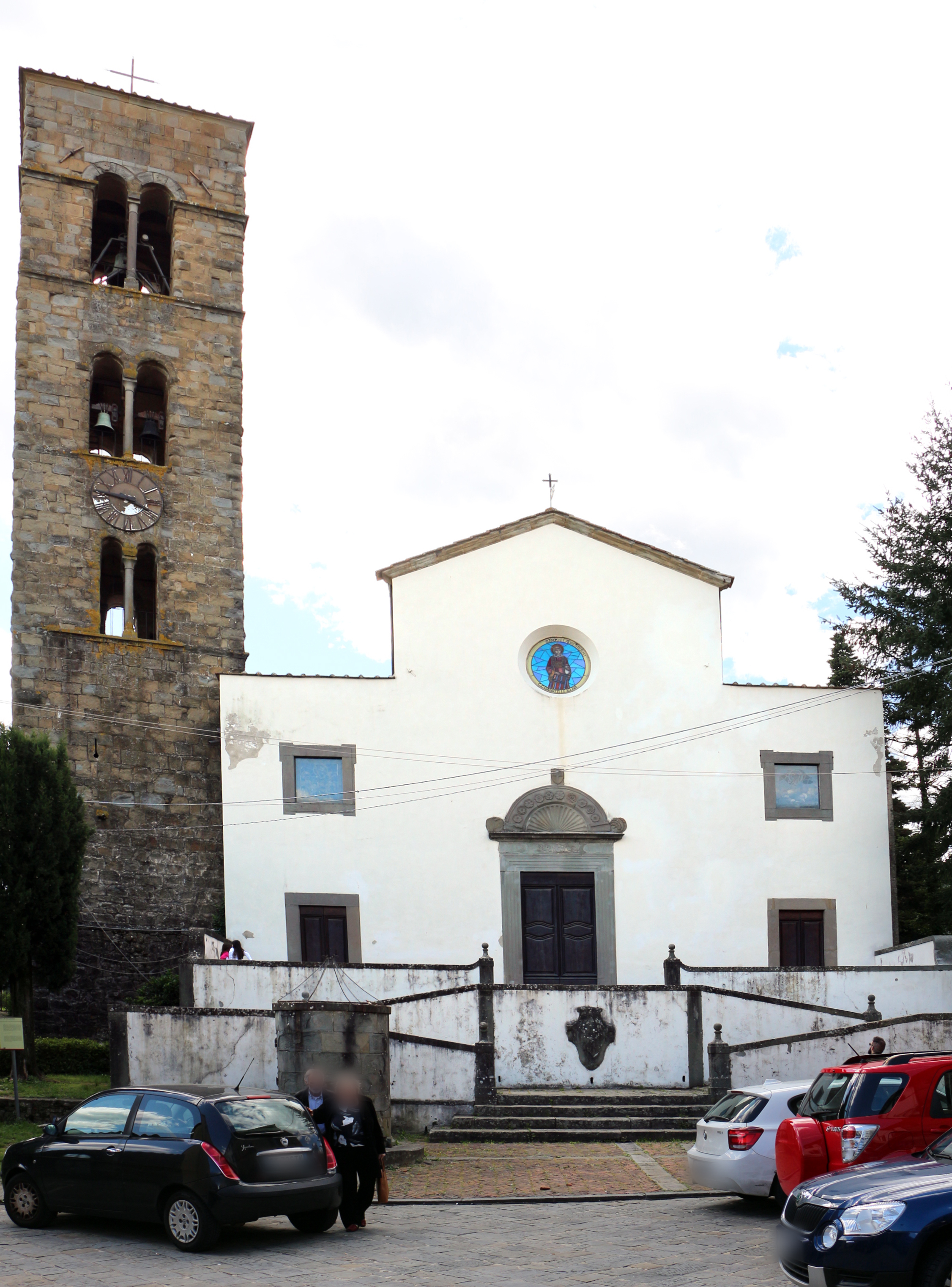
Chiesa di San Lorenzo
