= Gabriel Ferretti =

Blessed Italian Franciscan

Blessed Gabriel Ferretti O.F.M.
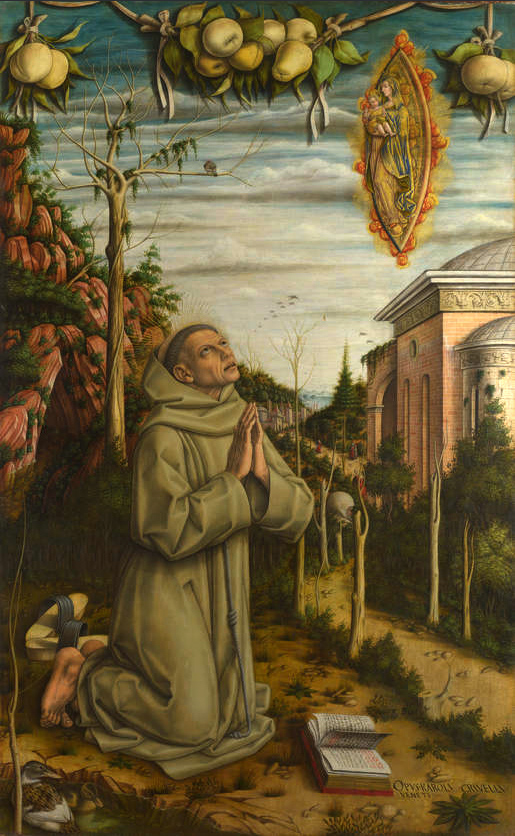
- Carlo Crivelli – 1480s.

Priest
- Born: c. 1385; Ancona, Papal States
- Died: 12 November 1456 (aged 71); Ancona, Italy
- Venerated in: Roman Catholic Church
- Beatified: 19 September 1753, Saint Peter's Basilica, Papal States by Pope Benedict XIV
- Feast: 9 November
- Attributes: Franciscan habit
- Patronage: Ancona

Gabriel Ferretti (c. 1385 – 12 November 1456) was an Italian Roman Catholic priest and a professed member of the Order of Friars Minor. He was an ancestor to both Cardinal Gabriele Ferretti and Pope Pius IX having been descended from a long noble lineage. Ferretti entered the religious life after becoming of age and soon after his ordination held two important leadership positions in the order. He set about restoring run down Franciscan convents in the region as well as seeing to the establishment of new ones to deal with an influx of new novices.

Ferretti's beatification cause could be traced soon after his death after Pope Callixtus III had Giacomo della Marca collect evidence that would attest to Ferretti's saintliness. Pope Benedict XIV later beatified Ferretti on 19 September 1753 in a decree that recognized his official "cultus" (or longstanding and popular veneration).

== Life ==
Gabriel Ferretti was born circa 1385 in Ancona as the eldest of ten children to the devout Count Liverotto Ferretti (a count since 1397) and Alvisia Sacchetti (who married in 1378) who were responsible for his upbringing in the Christian faith. He was an ancestor to future Cardinal Gabriele Ferretti and the future Pope Pius IX. His paternal grandfather was Francesco Ferretti and his paternal great-grandfather was Pietro Ferretti. His maternal grandfather was Simone Sacchetti. His siblings included:

- Francesco (1380–1435) – served as a podestà in several Italian cities.
- Paolina
- Pietro – made the uncanonical Bishop of Ancona (under Antipope John XXIII) and later the canonical Bishop of Ascoli Piceno (under Pope Martin V).

In 1403 he entered the Order of Friars Minor at their convent church of San Francesco ad Alto stationed in his hometown and did his novitiate and formation there prior to his solemn profession into the order. Ferretti achieved excellent results in his philosophical and theological studies during this time. He became respected for his virtuous and meek nature and after his ordination to the priesthood in 1410 was appointed to preach in the region which he did until 1425. It was following this preaching period that he was then assigned as the guardian for the Ancona convent in 1425 while he was soon after elected as the order's provincial for the entire Ancona province in 1434. He was diligent in enacting the functions of that office but was known for strict observance to the Franciscan rule; he was known to be severe with those who were lax in their observance of the rule.

Ferretti once travelled to Assisi but en route visited the Franciscan church in Foligno where the sacristan mistook him for being a simple religious brother. The sacristan asked him to serve the Mass for a priest who had just gone to the altar to prepare the Mass. Ferretti did so in obedience but the convent guardian recognized him at once and reproached the sacristan whom Ferretti defended. He said: "To serve Mass is a great privilege. The angels would consider themselves honored. So do not blame the brother for conferring that honor on me!"

His reputation for preaching to the masses was noted to the point where Giacomo della Marca – who was preaching in Bosnia – asked for his help in that task. But the Ancona council in their deliberations on 22 February 1438 passed a resolution asking Pope Eugene IV to ensure the friar remained in Ancona due to all his good works. The pope accepted this request which meant that Ferretti could not go to Bosnia to aid his friend.

He was zealous in the restoration and establishment of new convents. In San Severino Marche he restored the Santa Maria delle Grazie convent that had fallen into ruin while building the San Nicolò convent in Ascoli Piceno and then Santissima Annunziata in Osimo. He also saw to the enlargement of his own in Ancona in order to accommodate a stream of new novices who had come for admittance and formation in the order. Ferretti also advised on occasion the Bishop of Ancona, Antonio Fatati. In 1449 he left the post of provincial and became instead the superior for the convent church of San Francesco ad Alto which he remained until 1452.

Ferretti died in his cell in his convent on 12 November 1456 with Giacomo della Marca at his deathbed. It was he who delivered Ferretti's funeral oration in which he spoke of his virtue and holiness. Ferretti's remains were interred at San Francesco ad Alto until 1489 when his remains were exhumed with his sister Paolina organizing the new tomb for him; Pope Innocent VIII approved the exhumation on 17 July 1489 in the papal bull Desideratis ut. His remains were moved once more on 14 May 1862 to the Ancona Cathedral until their final transfer on 30 January 1943 to the San Giovanni Battista church that Ferretti's order managed.

== Beatification ==
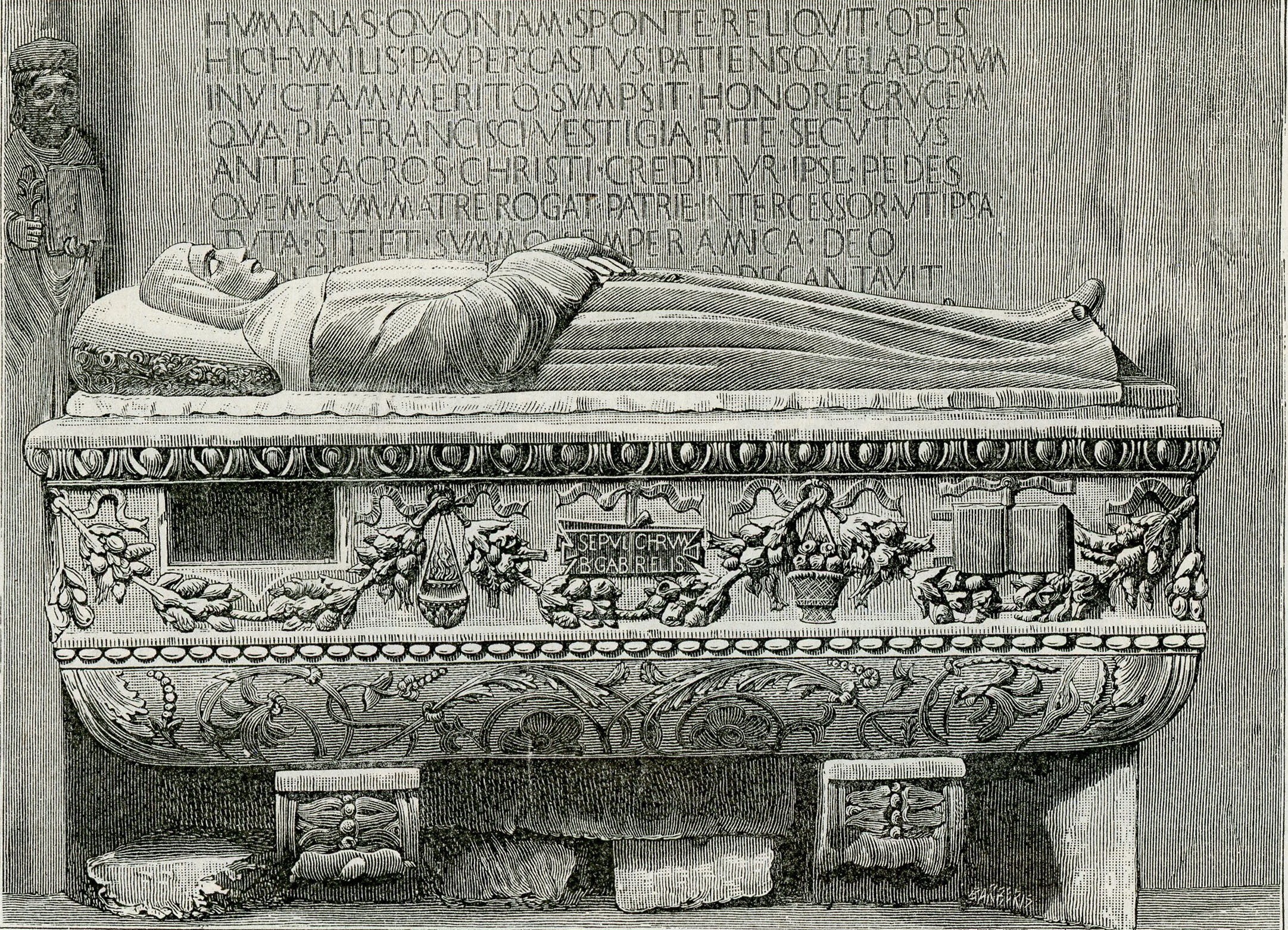
Former tomb in the Ancona Cathedral.

The reputation for Ferretti's holiness went further than Ancona to all those places he had visited during his lifetime. Pope Callixtus III – in 1456 just after the friar's death – ordered Giacomo della Marca to collect evidence that would attest to Ferretti's saintliness. Pope Benedict XIV later beatified Ferretti on 19 September 1753 in a decree that confirmed the friar's local "cultus" (or longstanding and popular veneration). That pope himself knew of Ferretti and his saintliness while he served as Bishop of Ancona prior to his pontifical election.
