= Vasco Ferretti =

Italian novelist, professor, and historian (born 1935)

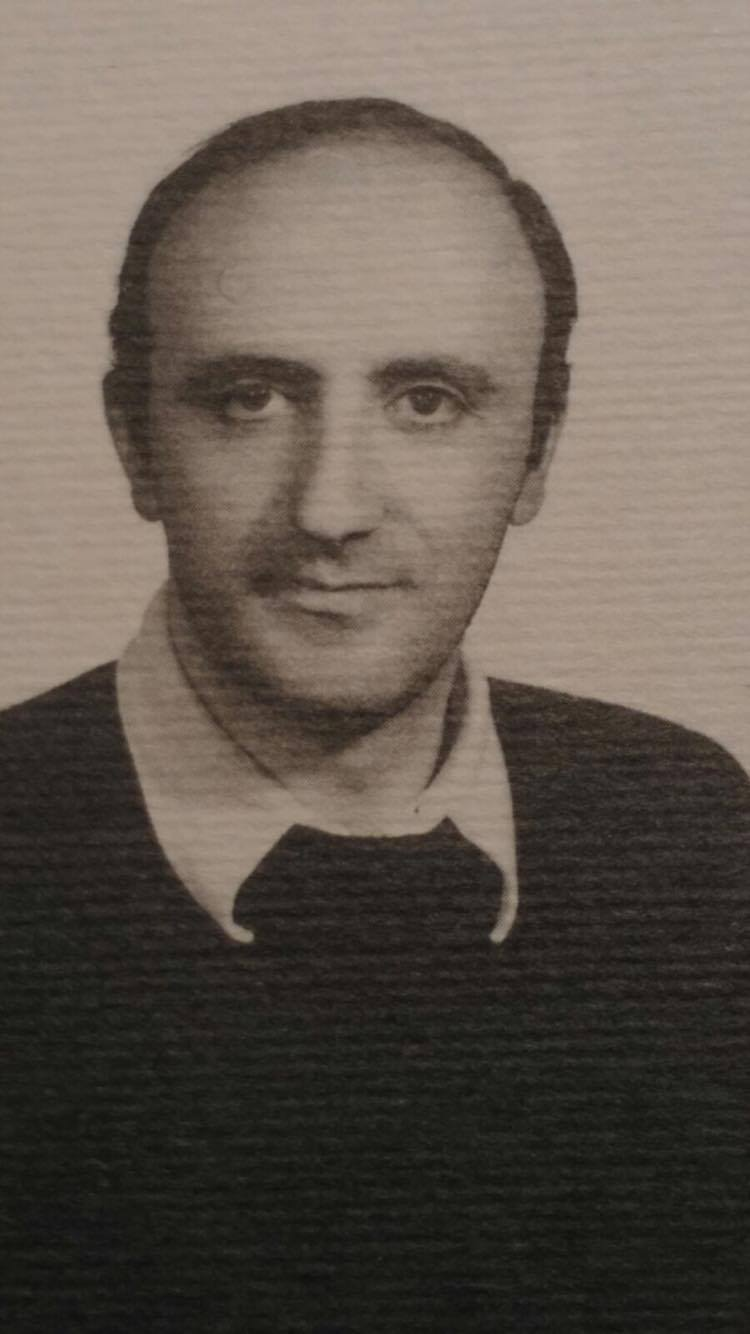
- Born: August 25, 1935 (age 91); Buggiano, Tuscany, Italy
- Citizenship: Italian
- Occupation: Writer
- Writing career
- Genre: Historical Novel
- Notable works: Kesselring (2009), Vip & Stars (1983), Le stragi naziste sotto la linea gotica. 1944: Sant'Anna di Stazzema, Padule di Fucecchio, Marzabotto(2004), Dante Alighieri e la battaglia di Montecatini (2015)
- Literary movement: Post War Romance
- Website: www.vascoferretti.it

Vasco Ferretti (born 25 August 1935) is an Italian novelist, historian, professor and journalist from Buggiano, Tuscany. He has written books in the fiction genres of historical novels and the Romance novel. His most important books are Kesselring (2009), Vip & Stars (1983), Dante Alighieri e la battaglia di Montecatini (2015), Le stragi naziste sotto la linea gotica 1944: Sant'Anna di Stazzema, Padule di Fucecchio, Marzabotto (2004).

== Biography ==
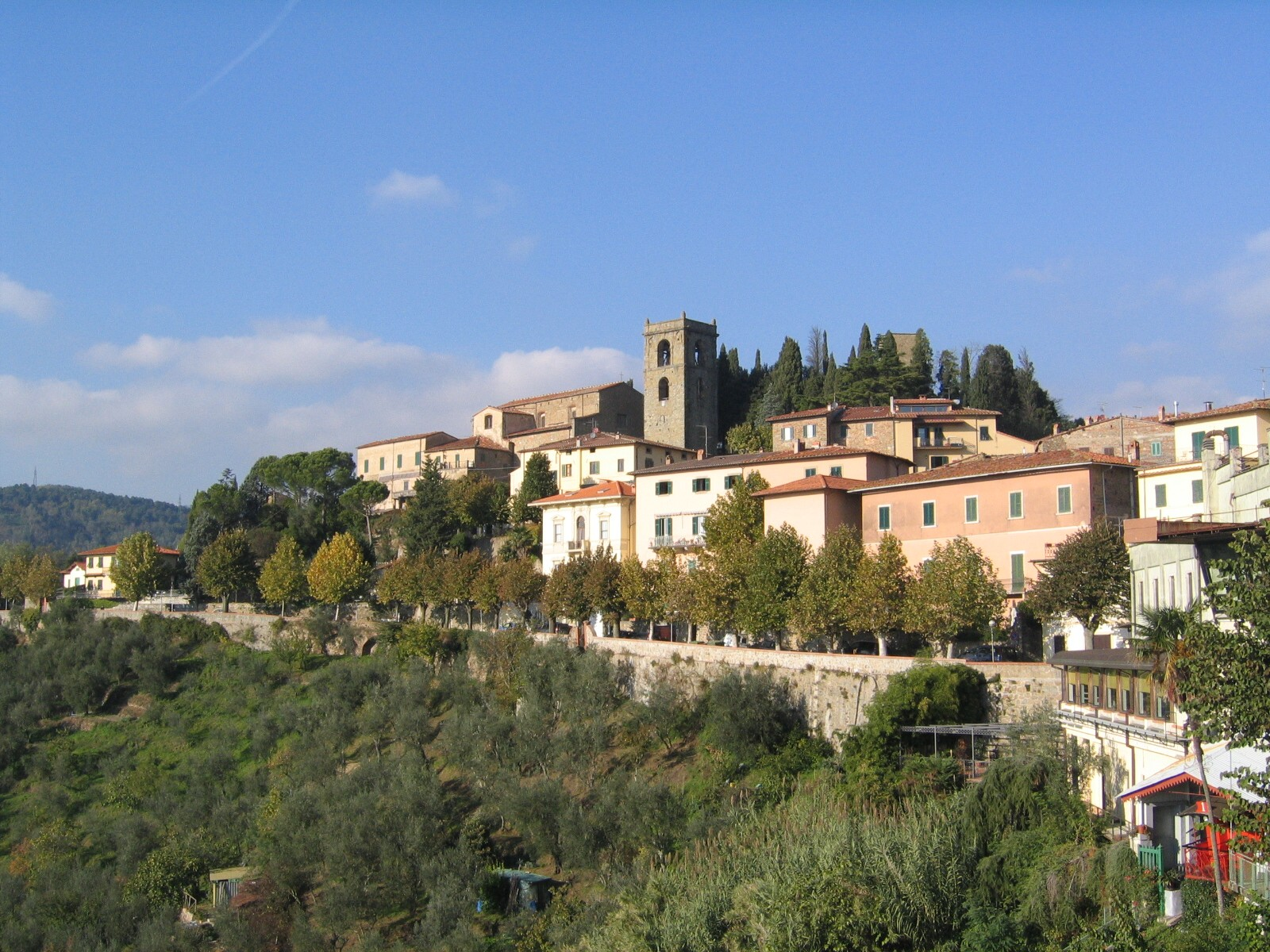
Montecatini; where Ferretti lived most of his life, and where he currently lives with his wife.

Vasco Ferretti was born in Buggiano, Toscana (August 25, 1935). He was born in to a farming family, and obtained his master's degree in 1953, after studying for two years at the Catering College of Montecatini. He then worked as a hotel doorman in Forte dei Marmi. In 1955–1956 he attended the annual course for trade union leaders of the Trade Union CISL (Centro Studi di San Domenico di Fiesole), and emerged with a five-year assignment in Rome as the National Secretary of Tourism Workers in the same CISL. He returned to Montecatini because of his family's economic problems and then studied to obtain a degree in philosophy and science of education in 1970 at the University of Urbino, where he subsequently taught for two years. His victory at the Ministerial Competition allowed him to teach philosophy and history at the Institute of Pescia and Montecatini, until his retirement from teaching in 1992. In 1975 he was listed in the Register of Journalists working in Tuscany. For the past decades he has dedicated himself to historical research by publishing with Mursia (Milan) the following works: "Kesselring" (biography); "Nazi massacres of Marzabotto, Stazzema and marshes of Fucecchio."; "1944, a Red Blood Summer", set in Tuscany under the German occupation during World War II. Ferretti also works with other publishers: "Lager and Gulag" with Amazon (ebook on Kindle).

== Influences ==
Ferretti's works are highly influenced by traces of his philosophical and classical formation. In passages of his books there are multiple references to Franz Kafka in the syntax and in the paragraph structure. His works are influenced by his association with Hermeticism and by his relationship with writers such as Giuseppe Ungaretti, Salvatore Quasimodo, Eugenio Montale and Dante Alighieri, who deeply influenced him and his literature. Hermeticism is a tradition which follows a set of philosophical and religious beliefs.

== Works ==
=== Kesselring (2009) ===
Kesselring (Edizioni Mursia, Milano, 2009) is a biography of Albert Kesselring, a German Luftwaffe general, during World War II. The general was born on November 30, 1885, in Marktsteft (German empire) and died in a sanatorium in Bad Nauheim in West Germany, on 16 July 1960 at the age of 74, following a heart attack. He was one of the most skillful and highly decorated commanders of Nazi Germany. The biography focuses on the general's military feats, his imprisonment and his participation to the Nuremberg trials(1946) as a witness, and to the trials in Venice (1947) as an accused. The structure of the biography is a historical-judiciary thriller, which is one of the characteristics that made this novel one of Vasco Ferretti's most relevant works. Author Ovidio Dallera in a review of Kesselring describes General Kesselring as a character who earned his notoriety unlike many historical characters who have obtained an undeserved 'fame'. Vasco Ferretti, has been the first historical researcher that has brought the acts of the process against Albert Kesselring in Italy, from the War Office in Kew (London), from which he also drew the book Vernichten. Kesselring by Vasco Ferretti isn't the only book regarding the general, since other writings about him could also be found, for example: Kesselring's own biography written by himself during his combat years, Albert Kesselring written by P. Paolo Battistelli and Kesselring: the making of the Luftwaffe written by Kenneth Macksey.

=== Dante Alighieri e la battaglia di Montecatini (2015) ===
Dante Alighieri e la battaglia di Montecatini (EDIFIR, 2015) is a historical novel about the Battle of Montecatini, on August 29, 1325 in the Province of Pistoia. The battle was fought in the Val di Nievole by the Republic of Pisa, and the forces of both the Kingdom of Naples and the Republic of Florence. The Guelphs and the Capetian House of Anjou hoped the battle represented the showdown for the Ghibellines of Pisa and of Lucca, led by Uguccione della Faggiuola and Castruccio Castracani, but it turned out to be a tragic defeat to the detriment of Florence instead. Niccolò Machiavelli, in his biography of Castruccio Castracani, wrote that the battle only caused thousands of deaths. Due to the ransom of many prisoners, Florence suffered an economic collapse and this situation made complex the conditions of Dante Alighieri, who was returning after thirteen years of exile. Dante himself, as well as all his biographers, desired to go back to Florence to spend the rest of his life. It unfortunately was a life expectancy never assuaged.

=== Vernichten (1988) ===
Vernichten (in German = 'annihilate') refers to the order given to the soldiers of the Wehrmacht for the massacre of the Marsh of Fucecchio on August 23–24, 1944. It was run by General Peter Eduard Crasemann and caused 174 victims (men, women and children). The massacre took place in the area between Pistoia and Florence that is called Marsh of Fucecchio. The reasons for the massacre are unclear, but could be related to false intelligence which pointed out the presence of gangs of partisans in the Marsh of Fucecchio.

=== Le stragi naziste sotto la linea gotica. 1944: Sant'Anna di Stazzema, Padule di Fucecchio, Marzabotto ===
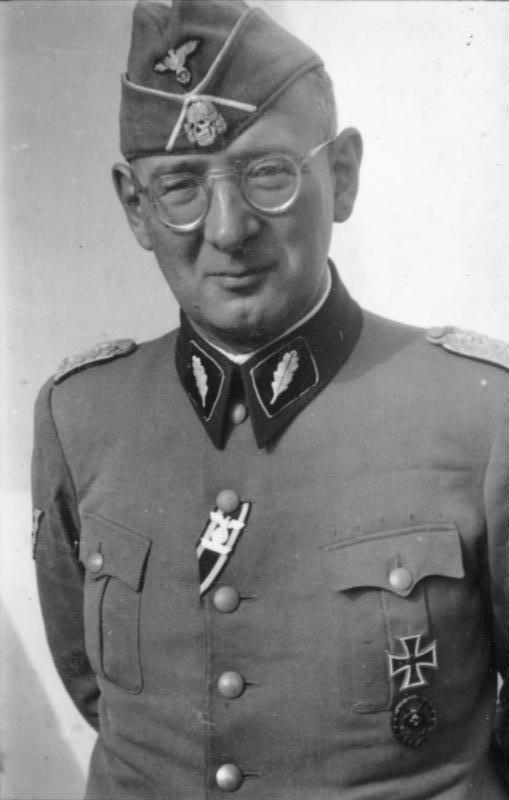
Max Simon

Le stragi naziste sotto la linea gotica. 1944: Sant'Anna di Stazzema, Padule di Fucecchio, Marzabotto is an enquire book about the massacres committed by the 16. SS-Panzergrenadier-Division "Reichsführer SS" and the 26 Panzer division commanded by the Corps Commander Max Simon. The book, released in 2004 analyzes the terroristic operations, committed by the nazi in order to intimidate and scare the population of Marzabotto, Sant'Anna di Stazzema and Padule di Fucecchio. The author provides a precise chronicle of the massacres and how they happened. The book also explores the background of those communities before the tragedy and the psychological impact these slaughters had on the population and on the partisan resistance. Due to its relevant historical content for the Italian culture, the book was inserted into the historical series of the Italian editor Mursia

=== Processo a Moravia (1994) ===
In a late evening of September 1974 (16 years before his death), Alberto Moravia is the great defendant in a process that takes place in one of the "liberty" rooms of the Tamerici baths in Montecatini. The accuser is Aldo Rossi, the defender of Moravia is Geno Pampaloni, a well known Italian book reviewer. It was a great opportunity for Moravia to express himself, his ideas and his motives to write rather than just focus on the process itself. He explained so much that it could have been possible to draft his autobiography. He was brought to the process because of his lack of proper interest in the country's affairs. He confesses his thoughts in front of an audience that previously had witnessed at the process of Pier Paolo Pasolini and accept his reasons as well as it did with Moravia's in this trial fiction. Moravia claims he is a disciple of Fëdor Dostoevskij (Fyodor Dostoyevsky): indeed traces of the Russian writer can be recognized in his literature. Alberto Moravia outlines his strong tendency to tell stories and his great curiosity as to illustrate his disengaged literature.

=== Vips e Stars, cento personaggi alle terme di Montecatini (1983) ===
Vips and stars is a unique story of characters that recalls the Belle Époque period and the roaring '60s. Its main characters are divas, geniuses, kings, lords, queens, maraharaja, writers, politicians, musicians, movie producers, actors and actresses. These celebrities are inserted in the scenario of the faboulous and famous city of Montecatini Terme. The main personalities in this story are:

Characters: Divas and Lords

- Lina Cavalieri, diva of the Belle Epoque

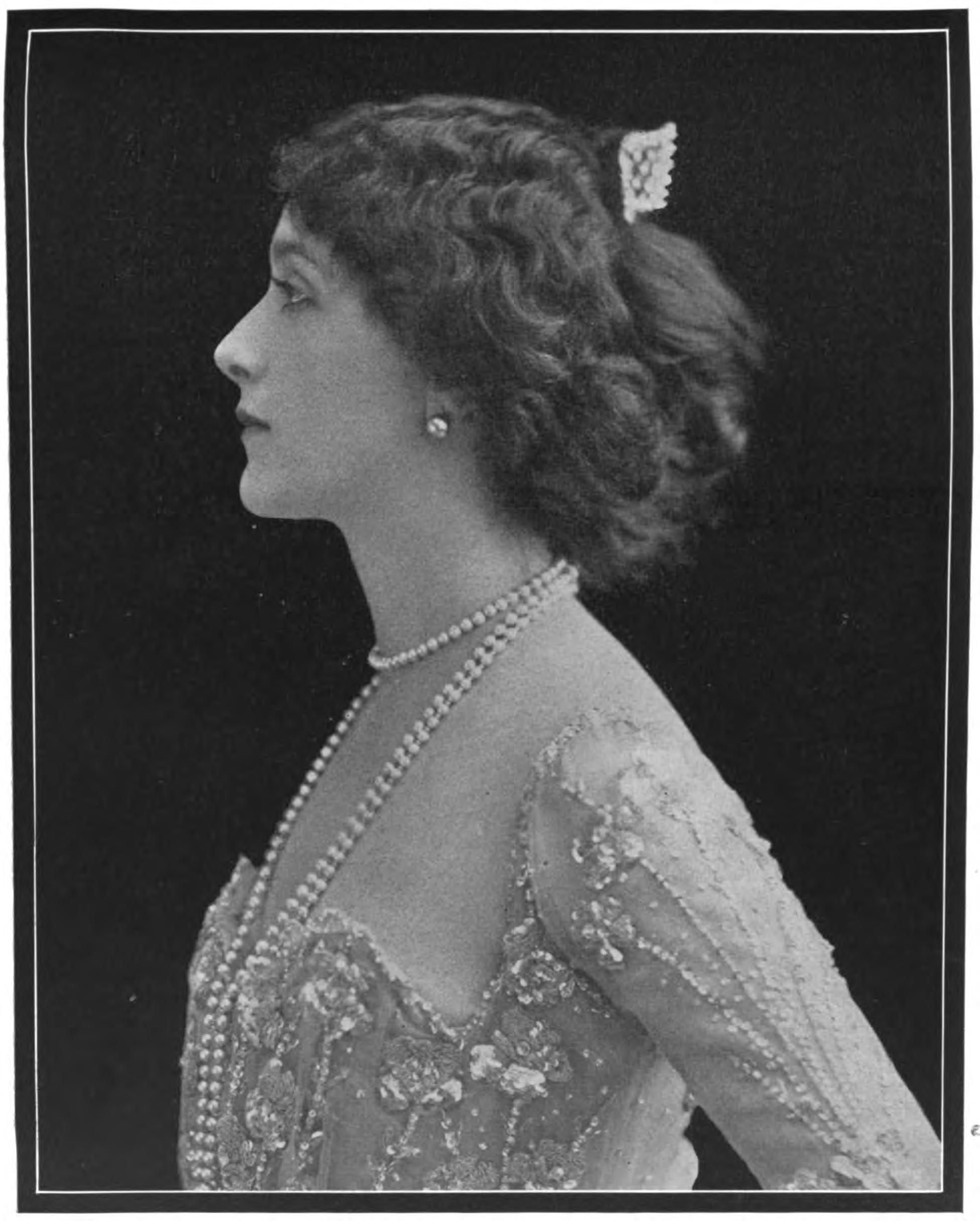
Lina Cavalieri

- Mary Pickford and Douglas Fairbanks, ambassadors from Hollywood
- Orson Welles, the magnificent
- William Holden, the last king of Hollywood

Politicians

- Enrico De Nicola, gentleman president
- Pietro Nenni, father of the Socialism
- Sandro Pertini, the most beloved president

Writers

- Massimo D’Azeglio, the wounded at the Locanda Maggiore
- Anita Loos, the great muse of Hollywood

Geniuses and Artists

- Giuseppe Verdi, the genius and the VIP
- Guglielmo Marconi, father of the modern era
- Giorgio de Chirico, the immortal metaphysical
- René Magritte, at the start of the Surrealism

Musicians

- Arrigo Boito, Verdi and the Othello
- Pietro Mascagni, the "rusticano"
- Giacomo Puccini, a Boheme life
- Richard Strauss, Salome and the Rose cavalier
- Herbert Von Karajan, the Salzburg king

=== Fuoco fatuo. Il lato effimero dell'amore (2014) ===
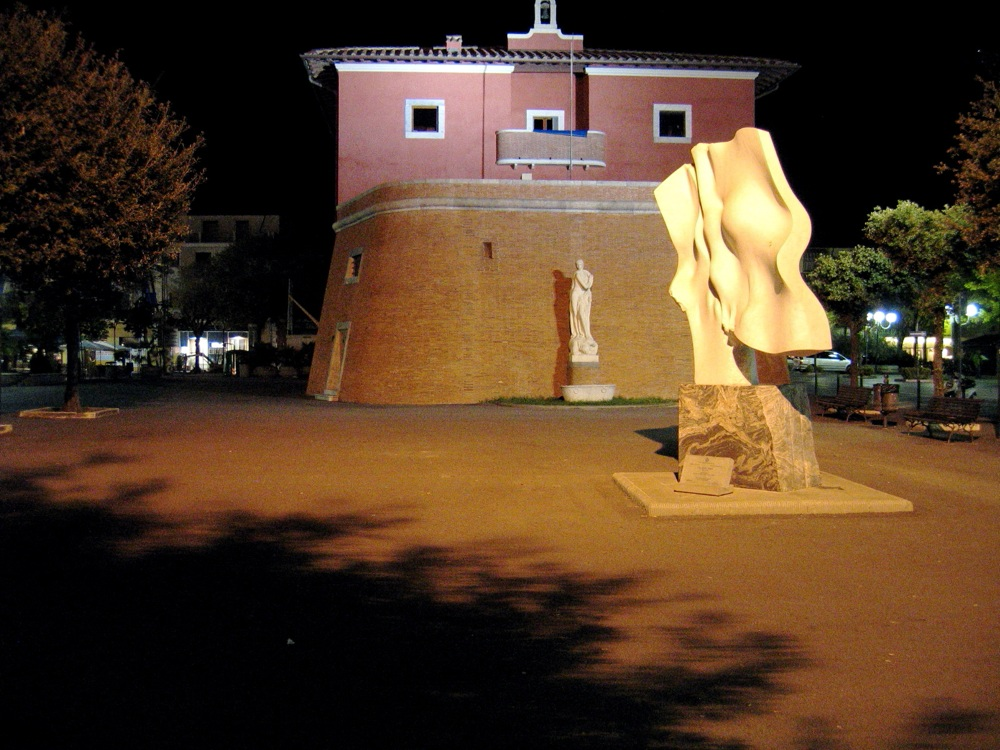
Night view of Forte Dei Marmi where most of the book is settled

This romance, set in the 60's, is about the story of Alessandro and Denise, two young high school students that meet on the dance floor of a disco in the city of Pistoia. The two immediately fall in love passionately with each other but their passion will make them face the consequences of belonging to different social classes and their different aspirations. As the boy moves to Forte dei Marmi to seek work as a concierge in a luxury hotel, Denise, a rebel soul, decides to escape from the upper class society in order to pursue her desire of success without letting him know about her movements. After all Alessandro doesn't give up and keeps following his love dream, facing rich entrepreneurs, actresses and movie directors. Ferretti shows in this work a snapshot of a period and of the generation of the time. The story is animated by a deep search of the meaning of life and by the never ending search under the surface of existence to get to its most authentic meaning

== Bibliography ==
- Umanità (Humanity) (1954)
- Insuccesso scolastico ed emarginazione sociale (school failure and social exclusion) (1972)
- La scuola a tempo pieno (the full-time school) (1973)
- Il pensiero filosofico moderno e la pedagogia dell‘ attivismo (The modern philosophy's thought and the pedagogy of' activism) (1973)
- La pedagogia tra scienze umane e scienze biologiche (Pedagogy between human and biological sciences) (1975)
- L’antico e il moderno. Mille anni di storia di Montecatini (The ancient and the modern. A thousand years of history of Montecatini) (1980)
- La seduzione del gioco (The seduction of the game) (1980-1981)
- Vip & Stars. Cento personaggi alle Terme di Montecatini (Vip & Stars. One hundred of characters in the Montecatini's SPA) (1983)
- Vernichten (1988)
- Exil (1989)
- Epos-Eros (1989)
- In morte della poesia e dei poeti (In the death of poetry and poets) (1991)
- Processo a Moravia (The process in Moravia) (1994)
- Le stragi naziste sotto la Linea Gotica (Nazi massacres under the Gothic Line) (2004)
- Il Comune di Montecatini Terme 1905.2005: cento anni di autonomia (The city of Montecatini Terme 1905.2005: one hundred years of autonomy) (2005)
- I944. Una estate rosso sangue (1944. a blood-red colored summer) (2007)
- Poetry- d'Amore si muore (Poetry- it's possible to die for Love) (2007)
- Thomas Stearns Eliot e Dante Alighieri: due poetiche a confronto (Thomas Stearns Eliot and Dante Alighieri: two poetic in comparison) (2008)
- Kesselring (2009)
- Viareggio. Cento anni di Casinò (Viareggio. One hundred years of Casinò) (2010)
- Vasco Pratolini. Fascismo/antifascismo e minimalismo narrativo degli esordi (Vasco Pratolini. Fascism / anti-fascism and narrative minimalism of the beginning)(2010)
- Montecatini e le sue Terme. Dalla Belle Epoque agli anni Duemila (Montecatini and its spa. From the Belle Epoque to the twenty-first century) (2010)
- 1944-2011. Padule di Fucecchio. La strage, il processo, la memoria di una comunità (1944-2011. Fucecchio Marshes. The massacre, the process, the memory of a community) (2011)
- Lager e Gulag. Piccola metafisica dell' omicidio di massa come igiene sociale (Lager and Gulag. Small metaphysics of 'mass murder as a social hygiene) (2013)
- Montecatinesi - Ricordi ed esperienze con ventisette protagonisti della società civile (Montecatinesi - Memories and experiences with twenty-seven representatives of civil society) (2014)
- Kill Heidrych (2014)
- Fuoco fatuo. Il lato effimero dell’amore (Wisp. The ephemeral side of love) (2014)
- Dante Alighieri e la battaglia di Montecatini (Dante Alighieri and the Battle of Montecatini) (2015)

=== Contemporary history ===
- Vernichten (1988)
- Le stragi naziste sotto la Linea Gotica (Nazi massacres under the Gothic Line) (2004)
- 1944. Una estate rosso sangue (1944. a blood-red colored summer) (2007)
- Kesselring (2009)
- 1944-2011. Padule di Fucecchio. La strage, il processo, la memoria di una comunità (1944-2011. Fucecchio Marshes. The massacre, the process, the memory of a community) (2011)
- Lager e Gulag. Piccola metafisica dell ‘omicidio di massa come igiene sociale (Lager and Gulag. Small metaphysics of 'mass murder as a social hygiene) (2013)
- Kill Heidrych (2014)
- Dante Alighieri e la battaglia di Montecatini (Dante Alighieri and the Battle of Montecatini) (2015)

=== Educational Sciences ===
- Insuccesso scolastico ed emarginazione sociale (school failure and social exclusion) (1972)
- La scuola a tempo pieno (the full-time school) (1973)
- Il pensiero filosofico moderno e la pedagogia dell' attivismo (The modern philosophical thought and the pedagogy of' activism) (1973)
- La pedagogia tra scienze umane e scienze biologiche (Pedagogy between human and biological sciences) (1975)
- La seduzione del gioco (The seduction of the game) (1980-1981)

=== Poems ===
- Umanità (Humanity) (1954)
- Exil (1989)
- Epos-Eros (1989)
- In morte della poesia e dei poeti (In the death of poetry and poets) (1991)
- Poetry- d'Amore si muore (Poetry- it's possible to die for Love) (2007)
- Thomas Stearns Eliot e Dante Alighieri: due poetiche a confronto (Thomas Stearns Eliot and Dante Alighieri: two poetic in comparison) (2008)

=== Literary criticism ===
- Processo a Moravia (The process in Moravia) (1994)
- Vasco Pratolini. Fascismo/antifascismo e minimalismo narrativo degli esordi (Vasco Pratolini. Fascism / anti-fascism and narrative minimalism of the beginning) (2010)

=== Local History Research ===
- L’antico e il moderno. Mille anni di storia di Montecatini (The ancient and the modern. A thousand years of history of Montecatini) (1980)
- Vip & Stars. Cento personaggi alle Terme di Montecatini (1983)
- Il Comune di Montecatini Terme 1905.2005: cento anni di autonomia (The city of Montecatini Terme 1905.2005: one hundred years of autonomy) (2005)
- Viareggio. Cento anni di Casinò (Viareggio. One hundred years of Casinò) (2010)
- Montecatini e le sue Terme. Dalla Belle Epoque agli anni Duemila (Montecatini and its spa. From the Belle Epoque to the twenty-first century) (2010)
- Montecatinesi - Ricordi ed esperienze con ventisette protagonisti della società civile (Montecatinesi - Memories and experiences with twenty-seven representatives of civil society) (2014)

=== Narrative ===
- Fuoco fatuo. Il lato effimero dell’amore (Wisp. The ephemeral side of love) (2014)
