= Samuele Sereni =

Italian footballer (born 1988)

Personal information
- Date of birth: 5 January 1988 (age 38)
- Place of birth: Castiglion Fibocchi, Italy
- Height: 1.78 m (5 ft 10 in)
- Position: Defender

Team information
- Current team: Olimpic Sansovino

Youth career
- Arezzo Gio

Senior career*
Years	Team	Apps	(Gls)
2007–2010	Arezzo Gio	26	(0)
2007–2009	→ Figline (loan)	61	(0)
2010–2011	Grosseto	2	(0)
2011	Pisa	9	(0)
2012	Mantova	17	(0)
2013	Arezzo	4	(0)
2013–2014	Rimini	17	(0)
2014–2015	S.P.A.L.	10	(0)
2014–2015	→ Pavia (loan)	21	(3)
2015–2016	Mantova	23	(0)
2016–2017	Forlì	26	(3)
2017–2019	Imolese	12	(0)
2019–2020	Arezzo	7	(0)
2020–2021	Olimpic Sansovino	-	(-)
- * Club domestic league appearances and goals

Samuele Sereni (born 5 January 1988) is an Italian footballer who plays as a defender.

== Club career ==
Sereni started his career in local Arezzo Gio. He was loaned to fourth-tier Figline for 2 years, before he could made his professional debut in the Lega Pro. On the summer of 2010, Serie B side Grosseto signed him, but he played only 2 match on the second tier. In January, he returned to Lega Pro, to Pisa. He spent here only a half season, before he signed to fourth-tier Mantova. One year later, he returned to Arezzo (at the time fourth-tier), before Rimini signed him. His next club was third-level S.P.A.L., before he was loaned to fellow third level Pavia. In the Lombardian team he scored 3 goals, but started the next season at Mantova. He spent the 2016–17 season at Forlì. In December 2017, after half year without club, he returned to Serie D, as Imolese signed him In September 2020, signing for a lower category team, Olimpic Sansovino (1st Category Toscana). In January 2019, his first club, Arezzo signed him again.

== Sources ==
- Samuele Sereni at TuttoCalciatori.net (in Italian)
