= US Borgo a Buggiano 1920 =

Italian football club

Borgo a Buggiano
- Full name: Unione Sportiva Borgo a Buggiano 1920
- Nicknames: Guerrieri azzurri (Blue warriors)
- Founded: 1920
- Ground: Stadio Alberto Benedetti, Borgo a Buggiano, Italy
- Capacity: 1,000
- Chairman: Luciano Arabelli
- Manager: Luca Biagi
- League: Terza Categoria
- 2012–13: Lega Pro Seconda Divisione B, 9th
Home colours	Away colours

Unione Sportiva Borgo a Buggiano 1920 is an Italian football club based in Borgo a Buggiano, a frazione of Buggiano, Tuscany.

== History ==
The club was founded in 1920.

Borgo a Buggiano won group D of the 2010-11 Serie D season and was promoted to Lega Pro Seconda Divisione for the first time.

== Dissolution and later reformation ==
At the end of the 2012–13 Lega Pro Seconda Divisione season, the club finished at ninth place in Group B, but they later renounced voluntarily from competing in the next season. As a result, they went out of business. But they later reformed and joined the 2013–14 Terza Categoria season.

== Colours and badge ==
The team's colour is light blue.
