= Buggiano =

- Comune
- Comune di Buggiano
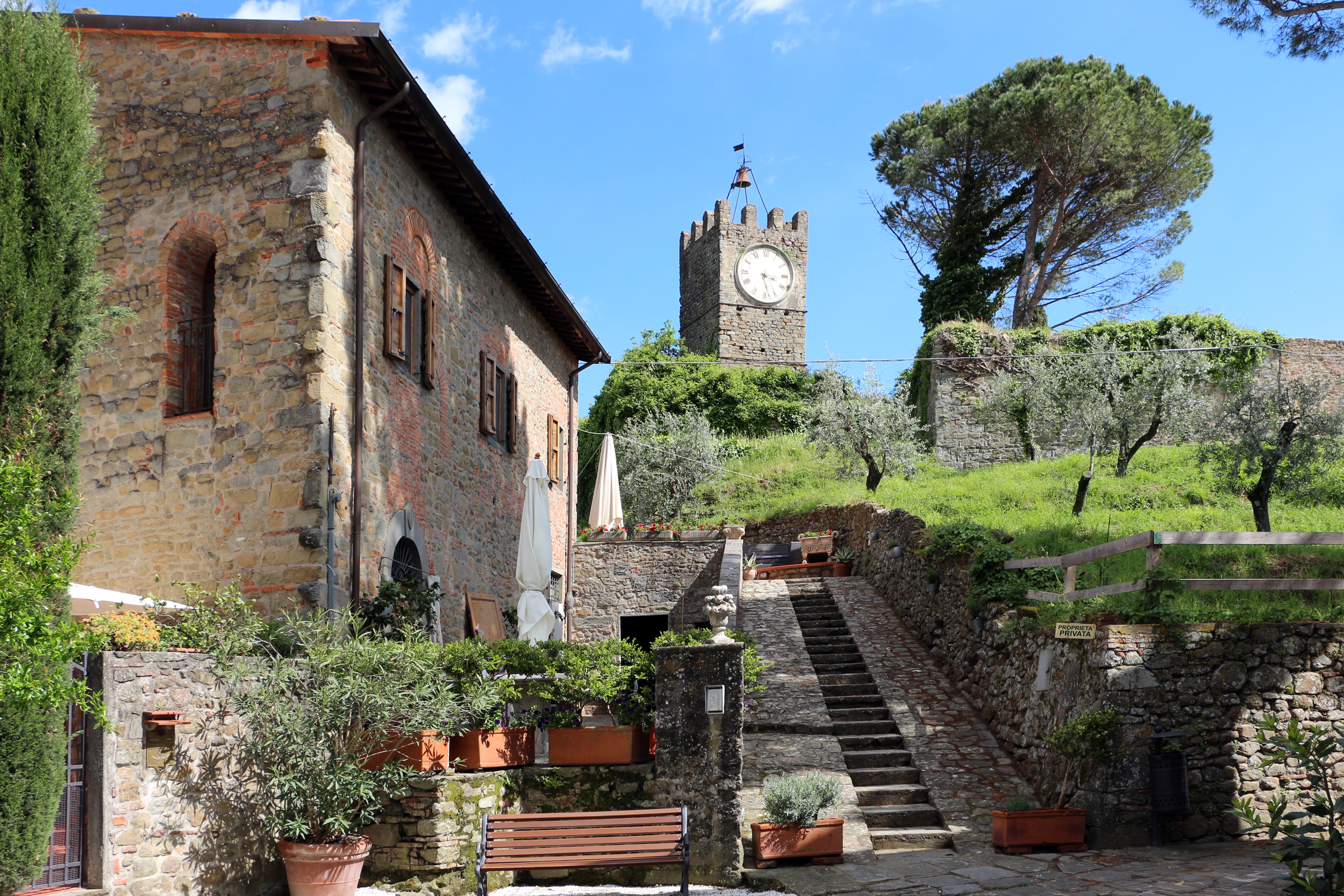
- View of Buggiano

- Coat of arms

- Location within Italy Location within Tuscany
- Coordinates: 43°53′N 10°44′E
- Country: Italy
- Region: Tuscany
- Province: Pistoia (PT)
- Frazioni: Borgo a Buggiano, Buggiano Castello, Colle di Buggiano, Malocchio, Pittini, Santa Maria, Stignano

Government
  - Mayor: Daniele Bettarini

Area
  - Total: 16.04 km^{2} (6.19 sq mi)
- Elevation: 41 m (135 ft)

Population (30 April 2017)
  - Total: 8,761
  - Density: 546.2/km^{2} (1,415/sq mi)
- Demonym: Borghigiani
- Time zone: UTC+1 (CET)
  - Summer (DST): UTC+2 (CEST)
- Postal code: 51011
- Dialing code: 0572
- Patron saint: Holy Crucifix
- Saint day: August 18
- Website: Official website

Buggiano is a comune (municipality) in the Province of Pistoia in the Italian region Tuscany, located about 45 kilometres (28 mi) northwest of Florence and about 15 kilometres (9 mi) southwest of Pistoia.

== Main sights ==
- Sanctuary of the Holy Crucifix (18th century)
- Pieve di Sant'Andrea (11th century).
- Pieve of San Lorenzo (13th century), remade in the two following centuries. It has a Romanesque bell tower with double mullioned windows, including the basement of an 11th-century tower. The interior has several 16th-century canvasses and a 14th-century crucifix.
- Madonna della Salute e di San Nicolao: 11th century church houses a 12th-13th century marble baptismal font with intarsia; a 1442 Annunciation by Bicci di Lorenzo; a painting of the Archangels Michael and Raphael with Tobias attributed to Giovanni Battista del Verrocchio; and a Baptism of Christ by Francesco Bachiacca.
- Villa Bellavista: 1695 baroque villa

== Twin cities ==
- Ascheberg, Germany

== People ==
- Benito Lorenzi (footballer)
- Vasco Ferretti (writer)
- Piqued Jacks (band)
