= Daniele Fioretti =

Italian footballer (born 1990)

Personal information
- Date of birth: 19 December 1990 (age 35)
- Place of birth: Umbertide, Italy
- Position: Forward

Team information
- Current team: Sasso Marconi Zola

Youth career
- –2009: Pontevecchio
- 2008: → Genoa (loan)

Senior career*
Years	Team	Apps	(Gls)
2007–2011	Pontevecchio	88	(32)
2008	→ Genoa (loan)	0	(0)
2011–2012	Bellaria	34	(10)
2012–2014	Cesena	0	(0)
2012–2013	→ Tritium (loan)	8	(0)
2013	→ Borgo (loan)	12	(0)
2013–2014	→ Bellaria (loan)	16	(6)
2014	Mantova	3	(1)
2014–2015	Legnago Salus	30	(14)
2015	Correggese	14	(4)
2015–2016	Sambenedettese	9	(1)
2016–2017	Recanatese	23	(4)
2017–2018	Este	33	(12)
2018	Matelica	14	(3)
2018–2019	Clodiense	16	(4)
2020	Ghivizzano Borgo a Mozzano	6	(0)
2020–	Sasso Marconi Zola	0	(0)
- * Club domestic league appearances and goals as of 12:15, 10 August 2020 (UTC)

Daniele Fioretti (born 19 December 1990) is an Italian footballer who plays as a forward for SSD Sasso Marconi Zola in Serie D.

== Career ==
Born in Umbertide, the Province of Perugia, Umbria, Fioretti started his career at Pontevecchio, a Serie D club located in Ponte San Giovanni, a frazione of the city of Perugia. In January 2008 he was signed by Genoa. Fioretti was excluded from pre-season call-up for Pontevecchio in 2008–09 Serie D, which soon after he was reinstated but only played 9 times for the first team. Fioretti was also suspended 6 games for the reserve in October 2008 by FIGC. In 2009–10 and 2010–11 Serie D, he scored 15 goals each, as the joint 4th and 4th top-scorer of Group E of 2009–10 season and 2010–11 season respectively.

In summer 2011, he was signed by the fourth division club Bellaria. He scored 10 times in his first fully professional season. On 28 June 2012, Serie B club Cesena signed him along with teammate Marco Mariani, and the coach of Bellaria at that time, Nicola Campedelli, is the brother of Cesena president Igor.

In July 2012 he was loaned to the third division club Tritium. On 9 January 2013 he left for the fourth division club Borgo-a-Buggiano along with former Bellaria teammate Daniele Forte from Cesena directly. He did not score any goal in 2012–13 season.

In August 2013 Fioretti returned to Bellaria along with Cesena teammate Nicola Del Pivo.

On 31 January 2014, Fioretti was signed by Mantova F.C. in co-ownership deal. The club qualified to 2014–15 Serie C as the 8th of Group A of 2013–14 Lega Pro Seconda Divisione.

On 23 December 2015, Fioretti was signed by A.S.D. Sambenedettese Calcio.
