= Emilio Ferretti =

Italian jurist and diplomat (1489–1552)

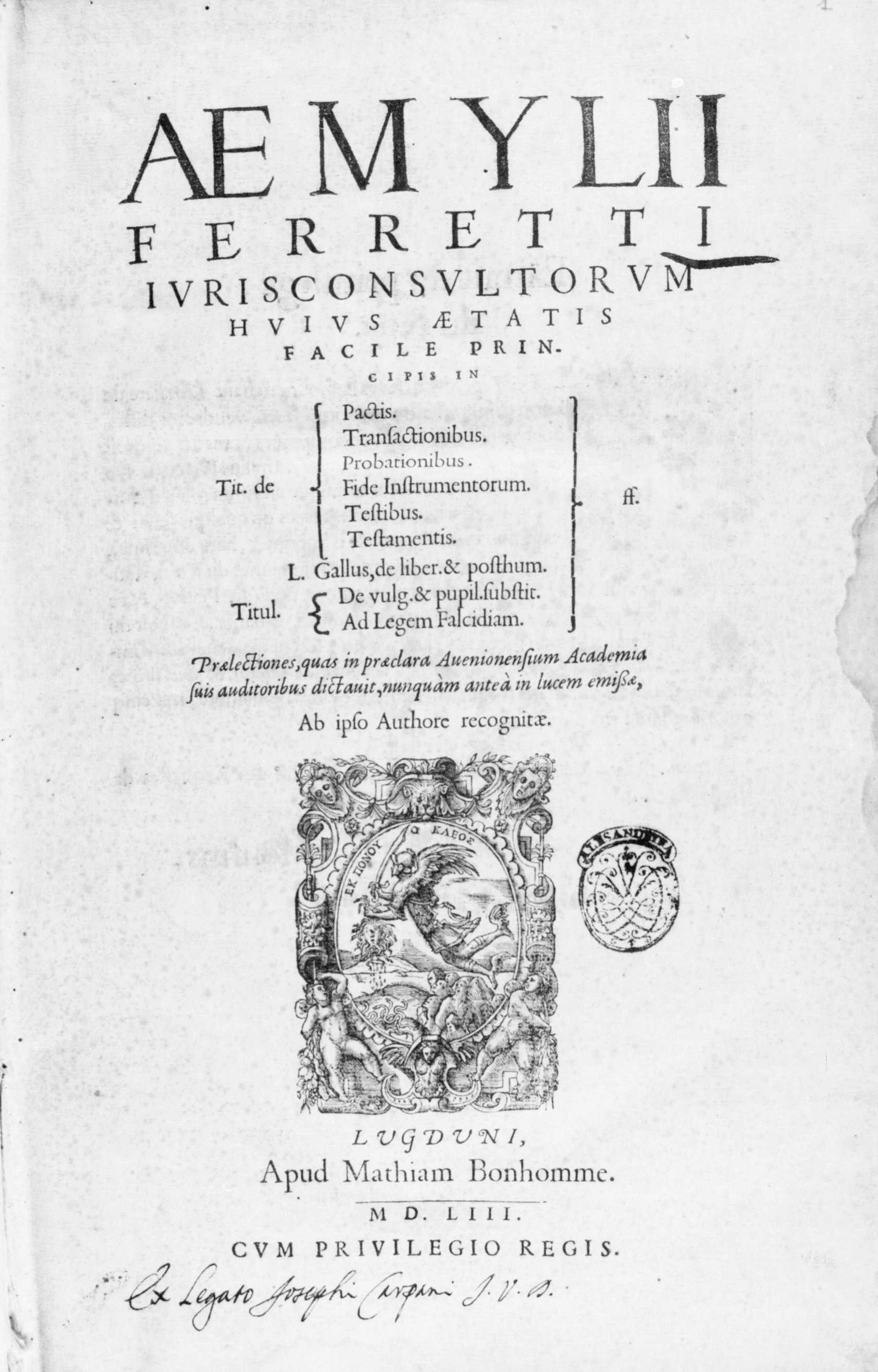
In titulum De pactis (1553)

Emilio Ferretti (born Domenico Ferretti; Castelfranco di Sotto, 14 November 1489 – Avignon, 15 July 1552) was an Italian jurist and diplomat, secretary in Rome to Pope Leo X and later professor of law at the University of Valencia and the University of Avignon.

== Works ==
- In Cornelii Taciti Annalium libros Aemylii Ferretti iurisconsulti annotatiunculae (in Latin). Lyon: Sébastien Gryphe. 1541.
- Libellus singularis De mora: et Legis vnicae de eo quod interest codice interpretatio (in Latin). Lyon: Macé Bonhomme. 1551.
- In titulum De pactis, transactionibus, probationibus, fide instrumentorum, testibus, testamentis (in Latin). Lyon: Maurice Roy & Louis Pesnot. 1553.
