= Fabio Reato =

Italian footballer

Personal information
- Date of birth: 20 March 1993 (age 33)
- Place of birth: L'Aquila, Italy
- Position: Defender

Youth career
- Milan
- 2011–2012: Pavia

Senior career*
Years	Team	Apps	(Gls)
2012–2015	Cesena	0	(0)
2012–2014	→ Pavia (loan)	22	(0)
2014–2015	→ Forlì (loan)	3	(0)
- * Club domestic league appearances and goals

Fabio Reato (born 20 March 1993) is an Italian former professional footballer who plays as a defender.

== Career ==
Born in L'Aquila, Abruzzo, Reato started his career at Lombard club A.C. Milan. In 2010–11 season he was a member of Berretti under-18 team. In 2011, he was signed by Pavia. In 2012, he was signed by Serie B club Cesena on a co-ownership deal with Pavia, for €150,000 transfer fee (César Meza Colli plus €75,000). He signed a 3-year contract.

Reato also returned to Pavia on a temporary deal in 2012–13 and 2013–14 Lega Pro Prima Divisione seasons. Cesena team-mate Matteo Zanini also joined Pavia along with Reato. In 2013 and again in 2014 the co-ownership deal were renewed.

In 2014, he left for Forlì along with L.Arrigoni, T.Arrigoni, N.Capellini, and M.Đurić. In June 2015 Cesena acquired Reato outright, as well as Pavia acquired Caio De Cenco outright.
