= Reto =

Given name

Reto is a masculine given name, commonly used in Switzerland only.

== Origin and meaning ==
The name means "coming from / related to Rhaetia, Rhaetian Alps, Rhaetian people or Rhaeto-Romance languages".

== Notable people ==
- Reto Berra - Swiss ice hockey player
- Reto Burgermeister - Swiss cross-country skier
- Reto Capadrutt - Swiss bobsledder
- Reto Götschi - Swiss bobsledder
- Reto Grütter - Swiss sidecarcross passenger
- Reto Salimbeni - Swiss film-maker
- Reto Schenkel - Swiss sprinter
- Reto Schmidiger – Swiss alpine ski racer
- Reto Stiffler - businessman
- Reto Suri - Swiss ice hockey player
- Reto Ziegler - Swiss footballer

== Other uses ==
- Reto-Moto - Danish videogame developer
