= Tommaso Arrigoni =

Italian footballer

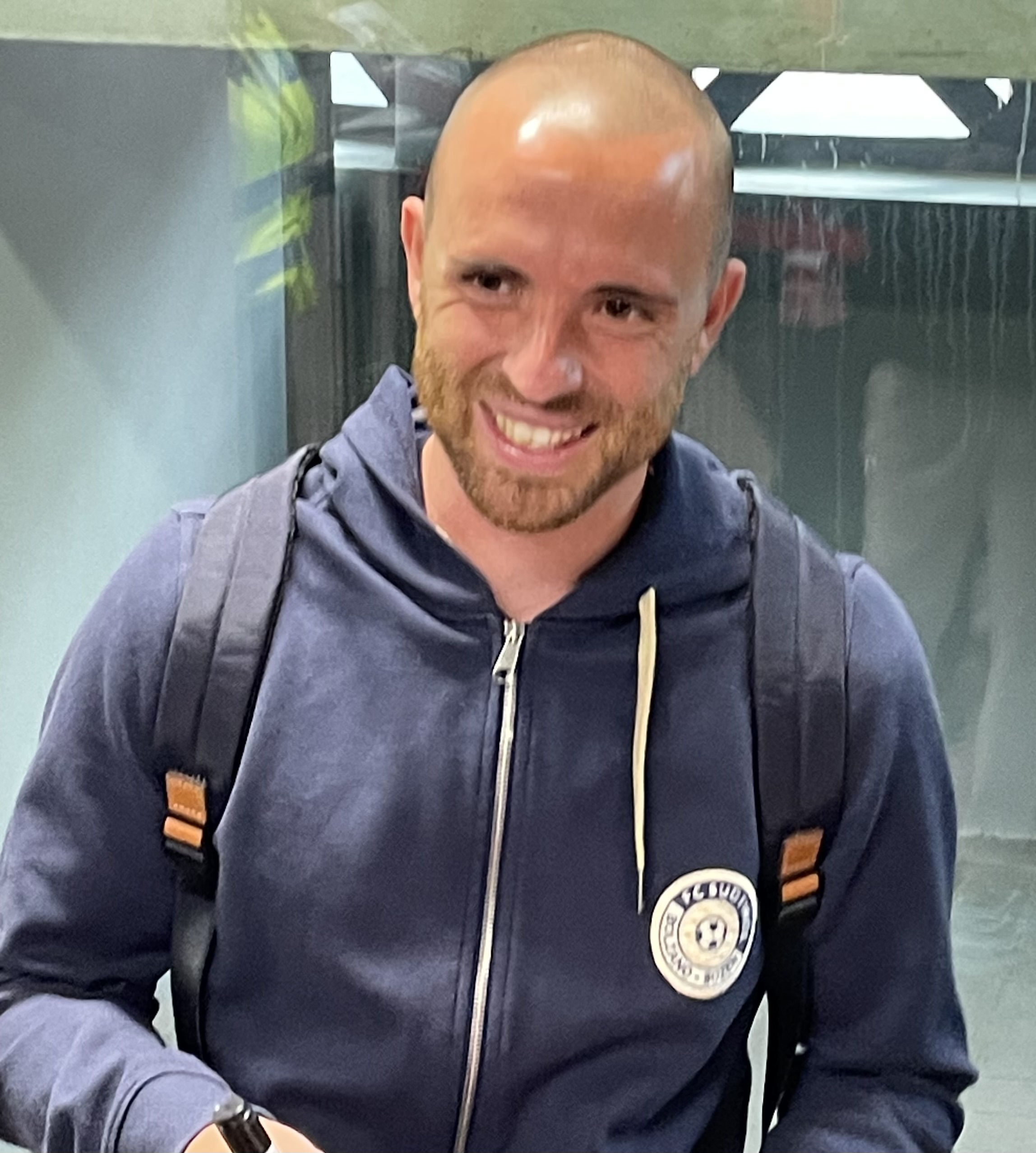

Personal information
- Date of birth: 26 February 1994 (age 32)
- Place of birth: Cesena, Italy
- Height: 1.71 m (5 ft 7 in)
- Position: Midfielder

Team information
- Current team: Livorno (on loan from Cesena)
- Number: 17

Youth career
- Cesena

Senior career*
Years	Team	Apps	(Gls)
2011–2017	Cesena	19	(0)
2012–2013	→ Tritium (loan)	17	(0)
2014	→ SPAL (loan)	12	(1)
2014–2015	→ Forlì (loan)	27	(1)
2015–2016	→ Santarcangelo (loan)	17	(0)
2016–2017	→ Lumezzane (loan)	39	(0)
2017–2018	Lucchese	35	(5)
2018–2020	Siena	53	(8)
2020–2024	Como	102	(8)
2024	→ Südtirol (loan)	17	(0)
2024–2025	Südtirol	20	(1)
2025–	Cesena	6	(0)
2026–	→ Livorno (loan)	0	(0)
- * Club domestic league appearances and goals as of 13 May 2026

Tommaso Arrigoni (born 26 February 1994) is an Italian footballer who plays as a midfielder for Serie C Group B club Livorno, on loan from Cesena.

== Club career ==
On 16 August 2012 Arrigoni left for Tritium on a temporary deal. On 24 January 2013 he was re-called from Trezzo sull'Adda. and immediately called-up against Vicenza, wearing shirt number 37. On 31 January 2014 he was signed by SPAL.

On 17 July 2014 Tommaso and Leonardo Arrigoni, Marco Đurić, Nicola Capellini and Fabio Reato were signed by Forlì.

On 31 August 2015 Tommaso was signed by Santarcangelo in another loan.

On 13 July 2016 Arrigoni was signed by Lumezzane.

On 20 August 2020, he signed a 2-year contract with Como.

On 15 January 2024, Arrigoni joined Südtirol in Serie B on loan until the end of the 2023–24 season, with Südtirol holding an obligation to make the transfer permanent at the end of the loan if they avoid relegation.

On 8 August 2025, Arrigoni signed a two-season contract with Cesena, returning to the resurrected version of his childhood hometown club.

== International career ==
Arrigoni received call-up from U16 and U18 team but only make his debut in an unofficial match. He received a call-up to a U17 international tournament. However he was later replaced by Angelo Chiavazzo.

== Personal life ==
His uncle Daniele Arrigoni is a former footballer and currently a football coach. Leonardo Arrigoni, son of Daniele is also a professional footballer.

Tommaso's brother Alfredo died in 2013.
