= Marco Mariani (footballer) =

Italian footballer

Personal information
- Date of birth: 25 December 1992 (age 33)
- Place of birth: Atri, Italy
- Position: Midfielder

Senior career*
Years	Team	Apps	(Gls)
2009–2011	Curi – Angolana	37	(1)
2011–2012	Bellaria – Igea	28	(1)
2012–2013	Cesena	0	(0)
2012–2013	→ Bellaria – Igea (loan)	28	(1)
2013–2014	Santarcangelo	30	(1)
- * Club domestic league appearances and goals

Marco Mariani (born 25 December 1992) is an Italian professional footballer who plays as a midfielder. He played in the fourth tier of football in Italy for Bellaria – Igea and Santarcangelo.

== Career ==
Born in Atri, Abruzzo, Mariani started his career at Abruzzan club Renato Curi – Angolana. He spent 2 seasons with the club in Serie D. In 2011, he was signed by professional club Bellaria – Igea Marina, which he made 24 starts in his first Serie C2 season for the Romagna-based club.

On 28 June 2012 he followed former Bellaria coach Nicola Campedelli to join another Romagnol club Cesena, which the club president was Igor, Nicola's brother. The club also signed team-mates Caio De Cenco, Daniele Fioretti and Daniele Forte from Bellaria. However Mariani was not included in the club's Serie B plan, which Mariani returned to Bellaria for 2012–13 season. The club also signed goalkeeper Andrea Rossini from Cesena (& Parma).

On 23 June 2013 Mariani remained in that region but for Santarcangelo di Romagna. Santarcangelo also signed Francesco Urso and Giacomo Bassoli (in January) from Cesena. Santarcangelo qualified to 2014–15 Serie C as the 5th of Group B of 2013–14 Serie C2.
