= Borgo a Buggiano =

- Frazione
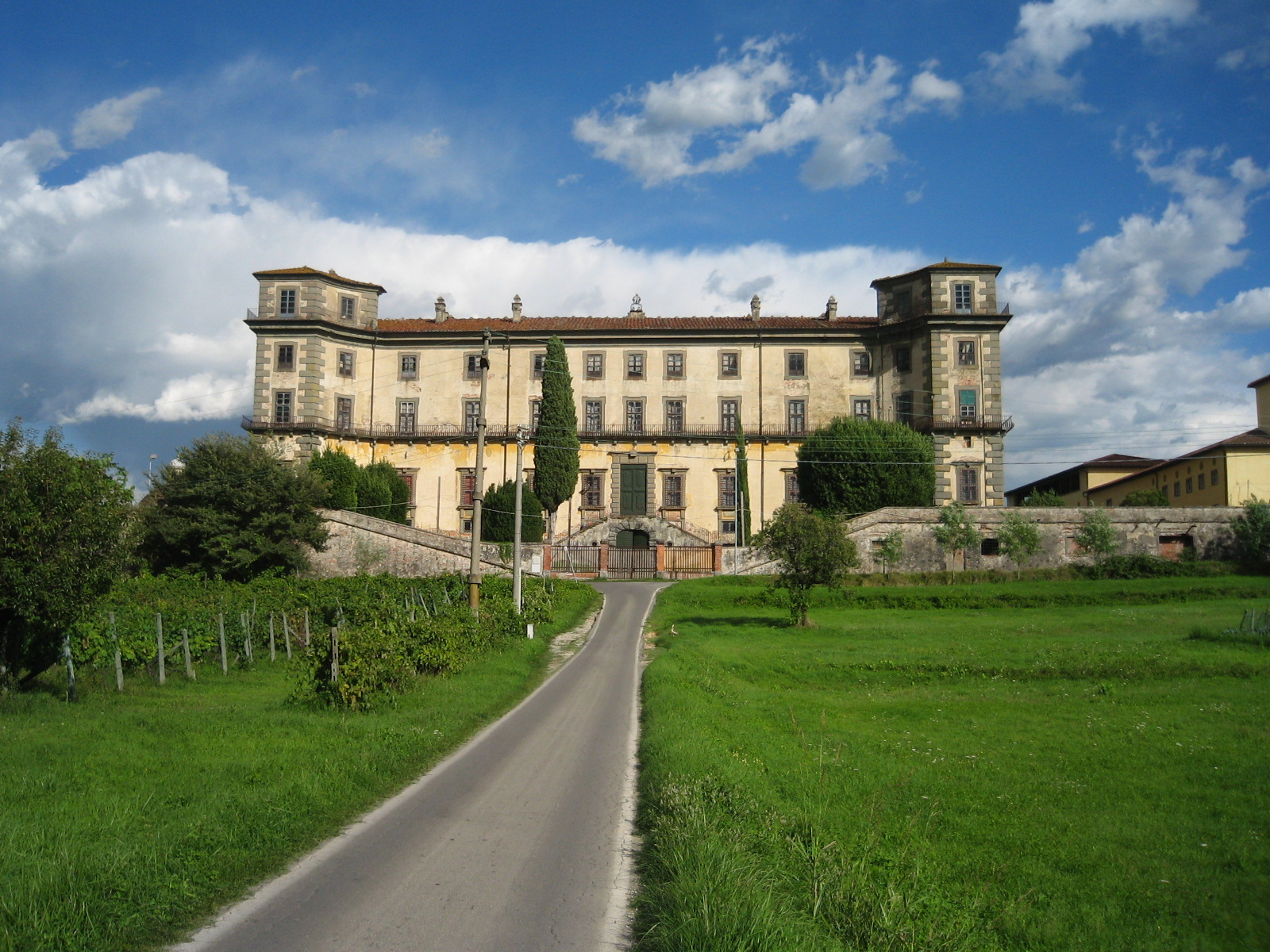
- Villa Bellavista in Borgo a Buggiano

- Location of Borgo a Buggiano in Italy
- Coordinates: 43°52′47″N 10°43′42″E
- Country: Italy
- Region: Tuscany
- Province: Pistoia (PT)
- Comune: Buggiano
- Elevation: 32 m (105 ft)

Population (2011)
  - Total: 7,302
- Time zone: UTC+1 (CET)
  - Summer (DST): UTC+2 (CEST)
- Postal code: 51011
- Dialing code: (+39) 0572

Borgo a Buggiano is a town in Tuscany, central Italy, and the municipal seat of the comune of Buggiano, province of Pistoia.

Borgo a Buggiano is about 21 km from Pistoia and 53 km from Florence.

== Sports ==
The town is home to the football team U.S. Borgo a Buggiano 1920, which reached Serie C.

== Bibliography ==
- Emanuele Repetti (1833). "Borgo a Buggiano". Dizionario geografico fisico storico della Toscana (in Italian). Vol. 1. Florence. pp. 336–337.
