= 2013 GM3 =

Near-Earth micro-asteroid

2013 GM_{3}
Discovery
- Discovered by: Mount Lemmon Srvy.
- Discovery site: Mount Lemmon Obs. (first observed only)
- Discovery date: 3 April 2013

Designations
- Minor planet category: Aten · NEO

Orbital characteristics
- Epoch 4 September 2017 (JD 2458000.5)
- Uncertainty parameter 7
- Observation arc: 12 days
- Aphelion: 1.0753 AU
- Perihelion: 0.5959 AU
- Semi-major axis: 0.8356 AU
- Eccentricity: 0.2869
- Orbital period (sidereal): 0.76 yr (279 days)
- Mean anomaly: 141.89°
- Mean motion: 1° 17^{m} 25.08^{s} / day
- Inclination: 0.0145°
- Longitude of ascending node: 329.79°
- Argument of perihelion: 19.638°
- Earth MOID: 0.0000948 AU · 0.037 LD

Physical characteristics
- Mean diameter: 0.017 km (generic at 0.20); 0.025 km (estimate)
- Absolute magnitude (H): 26.3

2013 GM_{3} is a micro-asteroid, classified as near-Earth object of the Aten group, approximately 20 meters in diameter. It was first observed on 3 April 2013, by astronomers of the Mount Lemmon Survey conducted at the Mount Lemmon Observatory near Tucson, Arizona, United States.

The asteroid has only been observed for 12 days. Based on a crude orbit determination, it has an exceptionally low MOID and may approach Earth at one lunar distance on 14 April 2026. Alternative calculations gave a much shorter distance with a possible minimum transit at approximately 8,600 kilometers above Earth's surface.

== Orbit and classification ==
2013 GM_{3} is a member of the dynamical Aten group, which are Earth-crossing asteroids and one of the smaller subgroups of near-Earth objects.

It orbits the Sun at a distance of 0.60–1.08 AU once every 9 months (279 days; semi-major axis of 0.84 AU). Its orbit has an eccentricity of 0.29 and an inclination of nearly 0° with respect to the ecliptic. The body's observation arc begins with a precovery taken by DECam at the Chilean Víctor M. Blanco Telescope on 1 April 2013, just two nights prior to its first official observation at Mount Lemmon.

=== Close approaches ===
2013 GM_{3} has a poorly determined orbit with an uncertainty parameter of 7, due to its short 12-day observation arc. Based on the preliminary orbital elements, the object has an Earth minimum orbital intersection distance of 0.0000948 AU (14,200 km), which translates into 0.037 lunar distances (LD). Due to its small size, that is, an absolute magnitude fainter than 22, it is not classified as a potentially hazardous asteroid.

On 14 April 2026, the object is currently predicted to approach Earth within a nominal distance of 0.00262382 AU (393,000 km; 244,000 mi) or 1.02 LD. It will also pass the Moon at a nominal distance of 0.00036017 AU (53,900 km; 33,500 mi). Conversely, Italian astronomers Piero Sicoli and Francesco Manca at the Sormano Astronomical Observatory estimated a close approach with Earth at a nominal distance of 68,420 kilometers and a possible minimum transit at approximately 8,600 kilometers above Earth's surface for that very same date. The two astronomers acknowledge that their orbital computations still contain large uncertainties.

== Physical characteristics ==
2013 GM_{3} has not been observed by any of the space-based surveys such as the Infrared Astronomical Satellite IRAS, the Japanese Akari satellite, and NASA's Wide-field Infrared Survey Explorer with its subsequent NEOWISE mission. Based on a generic magnitude-to-diameter conversion, 2013 GM_{3} measures approximately 17 meter in diameter using an absolute magnitude of 26.3 and assuming an albedo of 0.20, which is a typical figure for the common, stony S-type asteroids. Astronomers at the Sormano Astronomical Observatory estimate a similar diameter of 25 meters.

As of 2018, no rotational lightcurve of 2013 GM_{3} has been obtained from photometric observations. The asteroid's rotation period, shape and spin axis remain unknown.

== Numbering and naming ==
This minor planet has neither been numbered nor named.
