= Augusto Testa =

Italian astronomer

Minor planets discovered: 31
see § List of discovered minor planets

Augusto Testa (born 1950) is an Italian amateur astronomer and a discoverer of minor planets, observing at the Sormano Astronomical Observatory in northern Italy. According to the Minor Planet Center, he has discovered numerous asteroids during 1994–2000, all of them in collaboration with other astronomers (see table legend). In recognition of his achievements, the main-belt asteroid 11667 Testa, discovered by Luciano Tesi and Andrea Boattini at San Marcello Pistoiese Observatory in 1997, was named after him.

== List of discovered minor planets ==
| 7848 Bernasconi | 22 February 1996 | list^{[A]} |
| 8111 Hoepli | 2 April 1995 | list^{[B]} |
| 13777 Cielobuio | 20 October 1998 | list^{[A]} |
| 14103 Manzoni | 1 October 1997 | list^{[C]} |
| (17560) 1994 AD_{3} | 14 January 1994 | list^{[D]} |
| (17740) 1998 BC_{19} | 27 January 1998 | list^{[E]} |
| 18542 Broglio | 29 December 1996 | list^{[F]} |
| 19287 Paronelli | 22 February 1996 | list^{[A]} |
| 22500 Grazianoventre | 26 July 1997 | list^{[C]} |
| (24861) 1996 DE_{1} | 22 February 1996 | list^{[E]} |
| 27855 Giorgilli | 4 January 1995 | list^{[F]} |
| (29424) 1997 BV_{4} | 29 January 1997 | list^{[G]} |
| (31244) 1998 DG_{11} | 19 February 1998 | list^{[C]} |
| (32941) 1995 UY_{4} | 24 October 1995 | list^{[H]} |

| 33035 Pareschi | 27 September 1997 | list^{[A]} |
| (33049) 1997 UF_{5} | 25 October 1997 | list^{[C]} |
| 37734 Bonacina | 30 October 1996 | list^{[B]} |
| (39654) 1995 UP | 19 October 1995 | list^{[B]} |
| 43993 Mariola | 26 July 1997 | list^{[C]} |
| (48841) 1998 BB_{19} | 27 January 1998 | list^{[E]} |
| (69573) 1998 BQ_{26} | 28 January 1998 | list^{[C]} |
| 79472 Chiorny | 6 January 1998 | list^{[G]} |
| 79847 Colzani | 7 December 1998 | list^{[F]} |
| (85433) 1997 CJ_{22} | 13 February 1997 | list^{[A]} |
| (97356) 2000 AY_{27} | 5 January 2000 | list^{[G]} |
| (100711) 1998 BD_{19} | 27 January 1998 | list^{[E]} |
| (120679) 1997 BW_{4} | 29 January 1997 | list^{[G]} |
| (185688) 1997 CC_{6} | 6 February 1997 | list^{[A]} |

| 185733 Luigicolzani | 28 November 1998 | list^{[A]} |
| (219091) 1998 RF_{3} | 15 September 1998 | list^{[C]} |
| (282034) 1995 UO | 19 October 1995 | list^{[B]} |
Co-discovery made with:^{A} M. Cavagna^{B} V. Giuliani^{C} P. Sicoli^{D} C. Gualdoni^{E} P. Ghezzi^{F} F. Manca^{G} P. Chiavenna^{H} G. Ventre
