= 15460 Manca =

Asteroid

Discovery
- Discovered by: A. Boattini; L. Tesi
- Discovery site: San Marcello Pistoiese Obs.
- Discovery date: 25 December 1998

Designations
- Named after: Francesco Manca (Italian astronomer)
- Alternative designations: 1998 YD_{10} · 1994 ET_{1}
- Minor planet category: main-belt · Koronis

Orbital characteristics
- Epoch 4 September 2017 (JD 2458000.5)
- Uncertainty parameter 0
- Observation arc: 66.30 yr (24,216 days)
- Aphelion: 3.1671 AU
- Perihelion: 2.6460 AU
- Semi-major axis: 2.9065 AU
- Eccentricity: 0.0896
- Orbital period (sidereal): 4.96 yr (1,810 days)
- Mean anomaly: 316.30°
- Mean motion: 0° 11^{m} 56.04^{s} / day
- Inclination: 3.2872°
- Longitude of ascending node: 92.423°
- Argument of perihelion: 320.81°

Physical characteristics
- Dimensions: 5.17 km (calculated); 5.354±0.315 km
- Synodic rotation period: 7.2723±0.0209 h
- Geometric albedo: 0.24 (assumed); 0.2949±0.0586; 0.295±0.059
- Spectral type: X · S
- Absolute magnitude (H): 12.97±0.29 · 13.3 · 13.6 · 14.114±0.005 (S)

15460 Manca (provisional designation 1998 YD_{10}) is a Koronian asteroid from the outer region of the asteroid belt, approximately 5 kilometers in diameter.

The asteroid was discovered on 25 December 1998, by Italian astronomers Andrea Boattini and Luciano Tesi at Pistoia Mountains Astronomical Observatory in San Marcello Pistoiese, central Italy. It was named for Italian amateur astronomer Francesco Manca.

== Orbit and classification ==
Manca belongs to the Koronis family, a family of stony asteroids in the outer main-belt with nearly ecliptical orbits. It orbits the Sun at a distance of 2.6–3.2 astronomical units (AU) once every 4 years and 12 months (1,810 days). Its orbit has an eccentricity of 0.09 and an inclination of 3° with respect to the ecliptic.

The asteroid's observation arc begins 48 years prior to its official discovery observation, with a precovery taken at the Palomar Observatory in March 1950.

== Physical characteristics ==
Manca has also been characterized as an X-type asteroid by Pan-STARRS photometric survey.

=== Rotation period ===
In August 2012, a rotational lightcurve was obtained for Manca from photometric observations made at the Palomar Transient Factory, California. Analysis of the lightcurve gave a rotation period of 7.2723 hours with a brightness variation of 0.22 magnitude (U=2).

=== Diameter and albedo ===
According to the survey carried out by NASA's Wide-field Infrared Survey Explorer with its subsequent NEOWISE mission, Manca measures 5.35 kilometers in diameter and its surface has an albedo of 0.295. The Collaborative Asteroid Lightcurve Link assumes a stony standard albedo for members of the Koronis family of 0.24, and calculates a diameter of 5.17 kilometers with an absolute magnitude of 13.6.

== Naming ==
This minor planet was named for Italian amateur astronomer Francesco Manca (born 1966), member of the "Gruppo Astrofili Brianza" and an active observer of near-Earth objects, and potentially hazardous asteroids in particular, at Sormano Astronomical Observatory in northern Italy. The official naming citation was published by the Minor Planet Center on 13 October 2000 (M.P.C. 41388).
