= San Marcello Pistoiese =

- Frazione
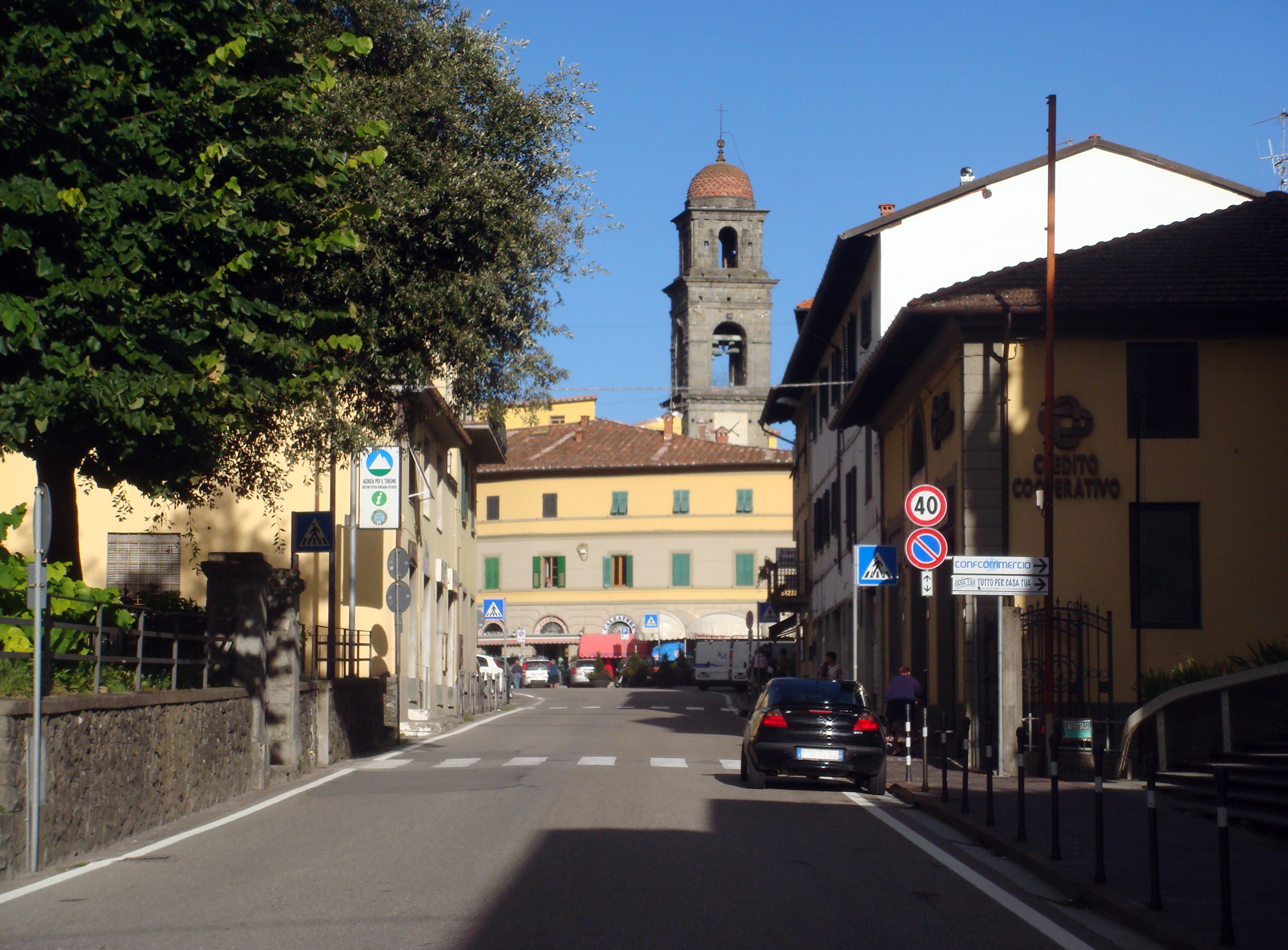
- Center of San Marcello Pistoiese

- Location of San Marcello Pistoiese in Italy
- Coordinates: 44°3′N 10°48′E
- Country: Italy
- Region: Tuscany
- Province: Pistoia (PT)
- Comune: San Marcello Piteglio

Area
  - Total: 84.7 km^{2} (32.7 sq mi)
- Elevation: 623 m (2,044 ft)

Population (2007)
  - Total: 6,917
  - Density: 81.7/km^{2} (212/sq mi)
- Demonym: Sammarcellini
- Time zone: UTC+1 (CET)
  - Summer (DST): UTC+2 (CEST)
- Postal code: 51028
- Dialing code: 0573
- Website: Official website

San Marcello Pistoiese was a comune (municipality) in the Province of Pistoia in the Italian region Tuscany, located about 45 kilometres (28 mi) northwest of Florence and about 15 kilometres (9 mi) northwest of Pistoia. It has been a frazione of San Marcello Piteglio since 2017.

== History ==
Before the Roman conquest (3rd-2nd centuries BC), the area was likely inhabited by some Italic tribe, such as the Ligures. The Roman senator Catilina died in 62 BC in a battle not far from here.

During the Middle Ages, San Marcello was an independent commune (13th century), until it fell to Pistoia in the late 14th century. The frazione of Gavinana was the location of the eponymous battle in 1530.

The original settlement started to grow substantially after the construction of the road connecting Pistoia to Modena, which passed through it (1781). In 1864 it was connected by the Ferrovia Porrettana, from Pistoia to Bologna, later expanded with an electric tramway line (Ferrovia Alto Pistoiese), from Pracchia to San Marcello.

The town has the longest pedestrian suspension bridge in Italy, Ponte sospeso di San Marcello Piteglio, connecting the frazione of Mammiano Basso and Popiglio, and spanning the river Lima. Among other sites are the parish church of San Marcello and the deconsecrated church of Santa Caterina, once affiliated with a convent of nuns.

== Science ==
San Marcello is home to the Pistoia Mountains Astronomical Observatory.
