= Alto Pistoiese railway =

Italian disused railway

Overview
- Status: Disused
- Locale: Tuscany, Italy
- Termini: Pracchia; Mammiano
- Stations: 9

Service
- Type: Light rail
- Depot(s): San Marcello locomotive depot

History
- Commenced: 1919
- Completed: 1926
- Closed: 1965

Technical
- Line length: 16.8 km (10.4 mi)
- Number of tracks: 1-2
- Track gauge: 950 mm (3 ft 1 3/8 in)
- Electrification: 1200 V DC
- Highest elevation: 842 m (2,762 ft)

The Alto Pistoiese railway, also known as the Pracchia-San Marcello Pistoiese-Mammiano railway, was an Italian narrow-gauge railway line, which ran in the Province of Pistoia between Pracchia and Mammiano with a spur to San Marcello Pistoiese. The railway was operational from 1926 until 1965, and was used by passenger services as well as freight trains.
