= 9115 Battisti =

Asteroid

Discovery
- Discovered by: P. Sicoli; F. Manca
- Discovery site: Sormano Obs. (587)
- Discovery date: 27 February 1997

Designations
- Named after: Lucio Battisti (singer, songwriter)
- Alternative designations: 1997 DG · 1980 RC_{8} 1991 RM_{21}
- Minor planet category: main-belt · Vestian

Orbital characteristics
- Epoch 4 September 2017 (JD 2458000.5)
- Uncertainty parameter 0
- Observation arc: 35.82 yr (13,082 days)
- Aphelion: 2.6103 AU
- Perihelion: 2.1806 AU
- Semi-major axis: 2.3955 AU
- Eccentricity: 0.0897
- Orbital period (sidereal): 3.71 yr (1,354 days)
- Mean anomaly: 91.637°
- Mean motion: 0° 15^{m} 56.88^{s} / day
- Inclination: 5.1604°
- Longitude of ascending node: 267.21°
- Argument of perihelion: 344.55°

Physical characteristics
- Dimensions: 5.14 km (calculated); 5.73±0.58 km
- Synodic rotation period: 5.0228±0.0025 h
- Geometric albedo: 0.195±0.054; 0.20 (assumed)
- Spectral type: S
- Absolute magnitude (H): 13.359±0.002 (R) · 13.60 · 13.69±0.22 · 13.7 · 13.81

9115 Battisti, provisional designation 1997 DG, is a stony Vestian asteroid from the inner regions of the asteroid belt, approximately 5.5 kilometers in diameter. It was discovered on 27 February 1997, by Italian astronomers Piero Sicoli and Francesco Manca at Sormano Astronomical Observatory in northern Italy. The asteroid was named for Italian singer-songwriter Lucio Battisti.

== Orbit and classification ==
Battisti is a member of the Vestian family. It orbits the Sun in the inner main-belt at a distance of 2.2–2.6 AU once every 3 years and 9 months (1,354 days). Its orbit has an eccentricity of 0.09 and an inclination of 5° with respect to the ecliptic. In September 1980, it was first identified as 1980 RC_{8} at Palomar Observatory, extending the body's observation arc by 17 years prior to its official discovery observation at Sormano.

== Physical characteristics ==
=== Rotation period ===
In November 2010, a fragmentary rotational lightcurve of Battisti was obtained from photometric observations at the Palomar Transient Factory in California. It gave a rotation period of 5.0228 hours with a low brightness variation of 0.07 magnitude (U=1), typically indicating that the asteroid has a nearly spheroidal shape.

=== Diameter and albedo ===
According to the survey carried out by NASA's Wide-field Infrared Survey Explorer with its subsequent NEOWISE mission, Battisti measures 5.7 kilometers in diameter and its surface has an albedo of 0.195, while the Collaborative Asteroid Lightcurve Link assumes a standard albedo of 0.20 for stony asteroids and calculates a diameter of 5.1 kilometers, based on an absolute magnitude of 13.82.

== Naming ==
This minor planet was named in memory of Italian singer-songwriter Lucio Battisti (1943–1998). In the 1970s, Battisti lived in a small village near Sormano, location of the discovering observatory. The official naming citation was published by the Minor Planet Center on 8 December 1998, three months after his death (M.P.C. 33389).
