= Marco Cavagna =

Italian astronomer

Minor planets discovered: 19
| 7199 Brianza | 28 March 1994 | list^{[A]} |
| 7848 Bernasconi | 22 February 1996 | list^{[B]} |
| 8106 Carpino | 23 December 1994 | list^{[C]} |
| 8935 Beccaria | 11 January 1997 | list^{[C]} |
| 13777 Cielobuio | 20 October 1998 | list^{[B]} |
| 16682 Donati | 18 March 1994 | list^{[A]} |
| 19287 Paronelli | 22 February 1996 | list^{[B]} |
| 19318 Somanah | 2 December 1996 | list^{[D]} |
| 23571 Zuaboni | 1 January 1995 | list^{[E]} |
| (31254) 1998 DK_{23} | 27 February 1998 | list^{[F]} |
| 33035 Pareschi | 27 September 1997 | list^{[B]} |
| 33151 Tomasobelloni | 25 February 1998 | list^{[G]} |
| 35316 Monella | 11 January 1997 | list^{[C]} |
| 55854 Stoppani | 8 November 1996 | list^{[F]} |
| 69971 Tanzi | 18 November 1998 | list |
| (79382) 1997 GC_{4} | 8 April 1997 | list^{[F]} |
| (85433) 1997 CJ_{22} | 13 February 1997 | list^{[B]} |
| (185688) 1997 CC_{6} | 6 February 1997 | list^{[B]} |
| 185733 Luigicolzani | 28 November 1998 | list^{[B]} |
Co-discovery made with:^{A} V. Giuliani^{B} A. Testa^{C} P. Sicoli^{D} F. Manca^{E} E. Galliani^{F} P. Chiavenna^{G} P. Ghezzi

Marco Cavagna (1958 – August 9, 2005) was an Italian amateur astronomer.

== Biography ==
During his career, Cavagna discovered numerous asteroids, operating from the Sormano Astronomical Observatory in Sormano, northern Italy. The Minor Planet Center credits him with the discovery of 19 minor planets he made between 1994 and 1998. In the 1970s and 1980s, he was one of Italy's leading observers of comets and national coordinator during the International Halley Watch in 1986. Cavagna was also a lecturer at the planetarium of Milan, co-founder of the Sormano Observatory, and a consultant for IAU's commission XX (Positions & motions of minor planets, comets and satellites).

Cavagna died of a stroke on 9 August 2005. The 0.5-meter Ritchey–Chrétien telescope at Sormano Observatory is now named in his memory. The inner main-belt asteroid 10149 Cavagna, discovered by astronomers Maura Tombelli and Andrea Boattini at San Marcello Pistoiese Observatory, was named after him in 1999 (M.P.C. 35494).

== Personal life ==
Cavagna was married to amateur astronomer Emanuela Galliani and they are jointly credited by the Minor Planet Center with the discovery of asteroid (23571) Zuaboni on 1 January 1995.
