= Francesco Manca =

Italian astronomer

Minor planets discovered: 26
see § List of discovered minor planets

Francesco Manca (born November 1966, in Milan, Italy) is an Italian amateur astronomer and discoverer of minor planets at the Sormano Astronomical Observatory in northern Italy.

Manca also performs follow-up astrometry of near-Earth objects (NEOs). He acquired research and observational experience on the NEOs at professional observatories in Arizona, United States at Catalina Sky Survey (IAU Obs code 703 and G96) Non-observational work focuses on computations of orbit and close approaches of asteroids with the Earth (linked at Center for Near Earth Object Studies (CNEOS) - Jet Propulsion Laboratory) and computation of orbit identifications of asteroids (Near Earth Asteroids, Mars-crossing asteroids, Hungaria group, Trans-Neptunian object) and comets.

He wrote many articles on specialistic magazines. Member of SIMCA (Italian: Società Italiana Meccanica Celeste e Astrodinamica), associated (INAF) National Institute for Astrophysics and International Asteroid Warning Network (IAWN). His professional activity concerns the application of measuring systems as encoders for Right Ascension and Declination (azimuth and elevation), installed on telescopes and Radio telescopes such as the VLT, LBT, ELT (Extremely Large Telescope), ALMA (Atacama Large Millimeter Array), DAG (Turkish for Eastern Anatolia Observatory), ASTRI (Astrophysics with mirrors at Italian Replicant Technology) and NEOSTEL (FlyEye telescope) for ESA or on space instruments as Solar Monitoring Observatory.

The Koronian asteroid 15460 Manca, discovered by Andrea Boattini and Luciano Tesi at San Marcello Pistoiese Observatory in 1998, is named in his honour.

== List of discovered minor planets ==
important; height: 324px;
9111 Matarazzo	28 January 1997	list^{[A]}
9115 Battisti	27 February 1997	list^{[A]}
(9796) 1996 HW	19 April 1996	list^{[B]}
10387 Bepicolombo	18 October 1996	list^{[A]}
10605 Guidoni	3 November 1996	list^{[C]}
10606 Crocco	3 November 1996	list^{[C]}
11652 Johnbrownlee	7 February 1997	list^{[A]}
12405 Nespoli	15 September 1995	list^{[C]}
18542 Broglio	29 December 1996	list^{[D]}
18556 Battiato	7 February 1997	list^{[A]}
19318 Somanah	2 December 1996	list^{[E]}
21289 Giacomel	3 November 1996	list^{[C]}

important; height: 324px;
26197 Bormio	31 March 1997	list^{[A]}
27855 Giorgilli	4 January 1995	list^{[D]}
32944 Gussalli	19 November 1995	list^{[A]}
35334 Yarkovsky	31 March 1997	list^{[A]}
37022 Robertovittori	22 October 2000	list^{[F]}
39734 Marchiori	14 December 1996	list^{[B]}
43956 Elidoro	7 February 1997	list^{[A]}
43957 Invernizzi	7 February 1997	list^{[A]}
48643 Allen-Beach	20 October 1995	list^{[A]}
59087 Maccacaro	15 November 1998	list^{[A]}
69961 Millosevich	15 November 1998	list^{[A]}
79847 Colzani	7 December 1998	list^{[D]}

important;
(96583) 1998 VG_{34}	15 November 1998	list^{[A]}
(100641) 1997 VO_{4}	3 November 1997	list^{[C]}
Co-discovery made with:^{A} P. Sicoli^{B} P. Chiavenna^{C} V. Giuliani^{D} A. Testa^{E} M. Cavagna^{F} G. Ventre

== See also ==
- Augusto Testa
- Marco Cavagna
- Graziano Ventre
- Pierangelo Ghezzi
- Piero Sicoli
- Valter Giuliani

== Publications ==
- "Asteroid and Planet Close Encounters", Minor Planet Bulletin, ( 1999 F. Manca, P. Sicoli )
- "Monitoring Hazardous Objects", Proceedings of the Third Italian Meeting of Planetary Science, ( 2000 F. Manca, P. Sicoli )
- "Planetary Close Encounters", Proceedings of the Fourth Italian Meeting of Planetary Science, ( 2002 F. Manca, P. Sicoli )
- "Minor planet recovery: analysis and verification of data obtained by OrbFit and Edipo software", Proceedings of the Fifth Italian Meeting of Planetary Science, ( 2003 F. Manca, A. Testa, M. Carpino)
- "Identification of asteroids and comets: methods and results", Proceedings of the X National Conference on Planetary Science. (2011 F. Manca, P. Sicoli, and A. Testa)
- "Identification of asteroids and comets: update on methods and results". Proceedings of the XI National Conference on Planetary Science. (2013 F. Manca, A. Testa)
- "Close encounters among asteroids, comets, Earth-Moon system and inner planets: the cases of (99942) Apophis and Comet C/2013 A1 ". Proceedings of the XII Italian national workshop of planetary sciences. (2015 F. Manca, P. Sicoli, A. Testa)
- "(WMT) Wide-field Mufara Telescope", Presentation at XIV Italian Meeting of Planetary Science, ( 2018 F. Manca, M. Di Martino )
- "TANDEM: a new SST station at INAF-OAS Loiano Observatory", Presentation at 75th International Astronautical Congress (IAC), (2024 D. Gallieni, F. Manca)
- Publication excerpt from ADS (The SAO/NASA Astrophysics Data System)

=== MPECs, CBETs and IAUCs ===
- MPEC 2009-Y21: COMET P/2009 W1 (Hill)
- IAUC 9102: COMET P/2009 W1 (Hill)
- MPEC 1999-G10: NEA 1996 FR3
- MPEC 2009-H16: PHA 1990 UA = 2009 FJ44
- MPEC 2008-G29: PHA 2005 GY8 = 2008 FG5
- MPEC 2010-G51: PHA 1998 WB2 = 2010 GJ7
- MPEC 2012-H43: NEA 2001 QN142 = 2012 HP2
- MPEC 2012-S56: NEA 2005 CZ6 = 2012 SO30
- MPEC 2012-T47: NEA 2007 UZ1 = 2012 TC53
- MPEC 2012-T65: NEA 2010 JN33 = 2012 TU78
- MPEC 2012-U91: PHA 1999 VR6 = 2012 UV68
- MPEC 2013-F21: PHA 2001 TA2 = 2013 FH
- MPEC 2013-J68: NEA 2008 HJ3 = 2013 JV22
- MPEC 2013-T67: NEA 2010 VD1 = 2013 TZ68
- MPEC 2013-X11: NEA 1998 WP7 = 2013 WS45
- MPEC 2014-C52: NEA 1995 CR = 2014 CL13
- MPEC 2014-H85: NEA 2007 VE3 = 2014 HL132
- MPEC 2014-L08: NEA 2011 ME = 2014 KU86
- MPEC 2014-N14: NEA 2011 OK5 = 2014 MS41
- MPEC 2014-P59: NEA 2010 ST16 = 2014 OT392
- MPEC 2014-T15: NEA 2005 SY25 = 2014 SA324
- MPEC 2014-T16: NEA 2007 TF15 = 2014 SK304
- MPEC 2014-W47: NEA 2014 UC115 = 2014 WN7
- MPEC 2014-W137: PHA 2009 VZ = 2014 WA363
- MPEC 2014-X18: NEA 2003 YE13 = 2014 WW365
- MPEC 2015-DA43: NEA 2008 HA2 = 2015 DB54
- MPEC 2015-E38: NEA 2007 EF88 = 2015 ES
- MPEC 2015-H75: NEA 2000 AH205 = 2015 HS9
- MPEC 2015-H86: COMET P/2004 R1 = 2015 HC10 (McNaught)
- CBET 4094: COMET P/2015 HC_10 = P/2004 R1 (McNAUGHT)
- MPEC 2015-H106: NEA 2015 FO124 = 2015 DP224
- MPEC 2015-Q12: NEA 2001 QJ96 = 2015 PK229
- MPEC 2015-Q13: TRANS NEPTUNIAN OBJECT 2014 UM33 = 2010 TQ182
- MPEC 2015-R33: NEA 2000 SM10 = 2015 RF2
- MPEC 2015-X118: NEA 2010 VU198 = 2015 XR129
- MPEC 2015-X131: NEA 2012 XT111 = 2015 XQ169
- MPEC 2016-A145: NEA 2002 LE31 = 2016 AJ131
- MPEC 2016-E69: NEA 2005 EQ95 = 2016 EB28
- MPEC 2016-E94: NEA 2005 SC = 2016 EH56
- MPEC 2016-N47: NEA 2010 MH1 = 2016 NZ
- MPEC 2016-R162: NEA 2009 SY = 2016 RX33
- MPEC 2016-T106: NEA 2005 CE41 = 2016 TA19
- MPEC 2016-X73: NEA 2010 XN = 2016 XX17
- MPEC 2017-W67: NEA 2006 WY3 = 2017 WO
- MPEC 2017-Y110: PHA 2009 EV = 2017 YQ4
- MPEC 2018-B11: NEA 2003 UO12 = 2018 AX11
- MPEC 2018-E53: NEA 2018 EO1 = 2013 LG7
- MPEC 2018-H83: NEA 2001 SC170 = 2018 HP1
- MPEC 2018-R135: NEA 1998 UM1 = 2018 RP4
- MPEC 2018-U64: TRANS NEPTUNIAN OBJECT 1997 GA45 = 2001 FH193
- MPEC 2018-V130: NEA 2018 VX1 = 2018 VA6
- MPEC 2019-A120: NEA 2007 HW4 = 2019 AE5
- MPEC 2019-B157: PHA 2012 OP4 = 2019 BR4
- MPEC 2019-C76: NEA 2002 CC26 = 2019 CM1
- MPEC 2019-H100: NEA 2014 HC177 = 2019 HU3
- MPEC 2019-R82: NEA 2008 CR116 = 2019 RN1
- MPEC 2019-T98: NEA 2015 FJ35 = 2019 TQ1
- MPEC 2019-V63: PHA 1998 US18 = 2019 VC1
- MPEC 2019-W120: NEA 2019 UG7 = 2019 WP
- MPEC 2020-C63: NEA 2020 BC15 = 2007 CP5
- MPEC 2020-N26: NEA 2013 JS7 = 2020 HG1
- MPEC 2020-N219: NEA 2005 FK = 2020 OU4
- MPEC 2020-Q225: NEA 1998 WA2 = 2020 PE
- MPEC 2020-U167: NEA 1998 VD32 = 2020 SS7
- MPEC 2020-V103: NEA 2001 GP2 = 2020 UJ7
- MPEC 2020- W35: PHA 2003 WP21 = 2020 VO6
- MPEC 2020-X13: NEA 2020 QM = 2019 RM4
- MPEC 2021-B32: NEA 2019 YH4 = 2010 CP199
- MPEC 2021-B33: NEA 2015 OO = 2010 CR247
- MPEC 2021-C49: NEA 2017 GQ5 = 2010 JY209
- MPEC 2021-C192: PHA 2010 KD149 = 2010 PW58
- MPEC 2021-F81: PHA 2010 FF10 = 2021 ES5
- MPEC 2021-J242: NEA 2010 LE152 = 2020 XY3
- MPEC 2021-K67: NEA 2021 HY9 = 2021 HW2
- MPEC 2021-K96: NEA 2010 NT81 = 2016 FZ14
- MPEC 2021-L68: NEA 2001 RX47 = 2021 LO1
- MPEC 2021-L85: PHA 2019 WW4 = 2010 BF135
- MPEC 2021-M39: NEA 2010 FY103 = 2021 AS7
- MPEC 2021-T58: NEA 2006 TO = 2021 TQ
- MPEC 2021-T131: NEA 2007 VD138 = 2021 SO5
- MPEC 2021-W27: NEA 2001 KY18 = 2021 VD5
- MPEC 2022-A16: PHA 2010 BV132 = 2021 MB2
- MPEC 2022-A124: PHA 2011 AT26 = 2022 AN3
- MPEC 2022-A165: NEA 2010 CN233 = 2010 BO127 = 2010 BH149 = 2010 BF150
- MPEC 2022-C25: NEA 2010 GT21 = 2021 VE10
- MPEC 2022-C54: NEA 2010 HW81 = 2022 BD3
- MPEC 2022-C220: NEA 2019 AG3 = 2010 KC138
- MPEC 2022-P105: NEA 2022 OU1 = 2010 BT71
- MPEC 2023-R08: NEA 2023 JH5 = 2010 MP122
- MPEC 2024-M22: NEA 2020 NB1 = 2010 JV181
- MPEC 2024-U131: NEA 2014 LM25 = 2019 LD7 = 2024 PE1
- MPEC 2025-M163: NEA 2008 NA = 2025 MF90
- MPEC 2025-Y148: NEA 2016 AP8 = 2025 YW3
- MPEC 2026-A61: NEA 2017 YX3 = 2026 AR
- MPEC 2026-E60: NEA 2026 BU = 2026 BV
- MPEC 2026-E67: NEA 2011 EC41 = 2026 DU14
- MPEC 2026-E68: NEA 2000 EZ106 = 2026 DU11
- MPEC 2026-E109: NEA 2015 EX = 2026 EK1
- MPEC 2026-E134: NEA 2005 XY4 = 2026 EG2
- MPEC 2026-G08: NEA 2010 HK22 = 2010 HE111 = 2025 XU
- MPEC 2026-G40: NEA 2001 MS3 = 2026 GF
- MPEC 2026-L20: NEA 2019 SB11 = 2026 JS4
- MPEC 2026-N52: NEA 2007 AA2 = 2026 NA1
- MPEC 2026-O86: NEA 2011 YD40 = 2026 OO3
