= 7866 Sicoli =

Nysa asteroid

Discovery
- Discovered by: E. Bowell
- Discovery site: Anderson Mesa Stn.
- Discovery date: 13 October 1982

Designations
- Named after: Piero Sicoli (discoverer of minor planets)
- Alternative designations: 1982 TK · 1954 CT; 1959 OD
- Minor planet category: main-belt · Nysa–Polana complex

Orbital characteristics
- Epoch 4 September 2017 (JD 2458000.5)
- Uncertainty parameter 0
- Observation arc: 63.01 yr (23,016 days)
- Aphelion: 2.9392 AU
- Perihelion: 1.9165 AU
- Semi-major axis: 2.4279 AU
- Eccentricity: 0.2106
- Orbital period (sidereal): 3.78 yr (1,382 days)
- Mean anomaly: 112.12°
- Mean motion: 0° 15^{m} 37.8^{s} / day
- Inclination: 3.4801°
- Longitude of ascending node: 77.978°
- Argument of perihelion: 253.20°

Physical characteristics
- Dimensions: 5.604±0.199 km 6.34 km (calculated)
- Geometric albedo: 0.21 (assumed); 0.2455±0.0504; 0.246±0.050
- Spectral type: S
- Absolute magnitude (H): 13.28±0.28 · 13.3 · 13.4

7866 Sicoli, provisional designation 1982 TK, is a stony asteroid from the inner regions of the asteroid belt, approximately 6 kilometers in diameter. It was discovered on 13 October 1982, by American astronomer Edward Bowell at Lowell's Anderson Mesa Station near Flagstaff, Arizona. The asteroid was named after Italian astronomer Piero Sicoli.

== Orbit and classification ==
Sicoli orbits the Sun in the inner main-belt at a distance of 1.9–2.9 AU once every 3 years and 9 months (1,382 days). Its orbit has an eccentricity of 0.21 and an inclination of 3° with respect to the ecliptic. The first precovery was taken at Palomar Mountain in 1954, extending the asteroid's observation arc by 28 years prior to its discovery.

== Physical characteristics ==
=== Diameter and albedo ===
According to the survey carried out by NASA's Wide-field Infrared Survey Explorer with its subsequent NEOWISE mission, Sicoli measures 6.3 kilometers in diameter and its surface has an albedo of 0.246, while the Collaborative Asteroid Lightcurve Link assumes a standard albedo for stony asteroids of 0.21 and calculates a diameter of 5.6 kilometers, based on an absolute magnitude of 13.3.

=== Lightcurves ===
As of 2016, no rotational lightcurve has been obtained for this asteroid and its rotation period and shape remain unknown.

== Naming ==
This minor planet was named in honor of Italian astronomer Piero Sicoli (born 1954), a discoverer of minor planets and Observation Coordinator at the Sormano Astronomical Observatory in northern Italy. The official naming citation was published by the Minor Planet Center on 28 July 1999 (M.P.C. 35488).
