= San Mommè =

- Frazione
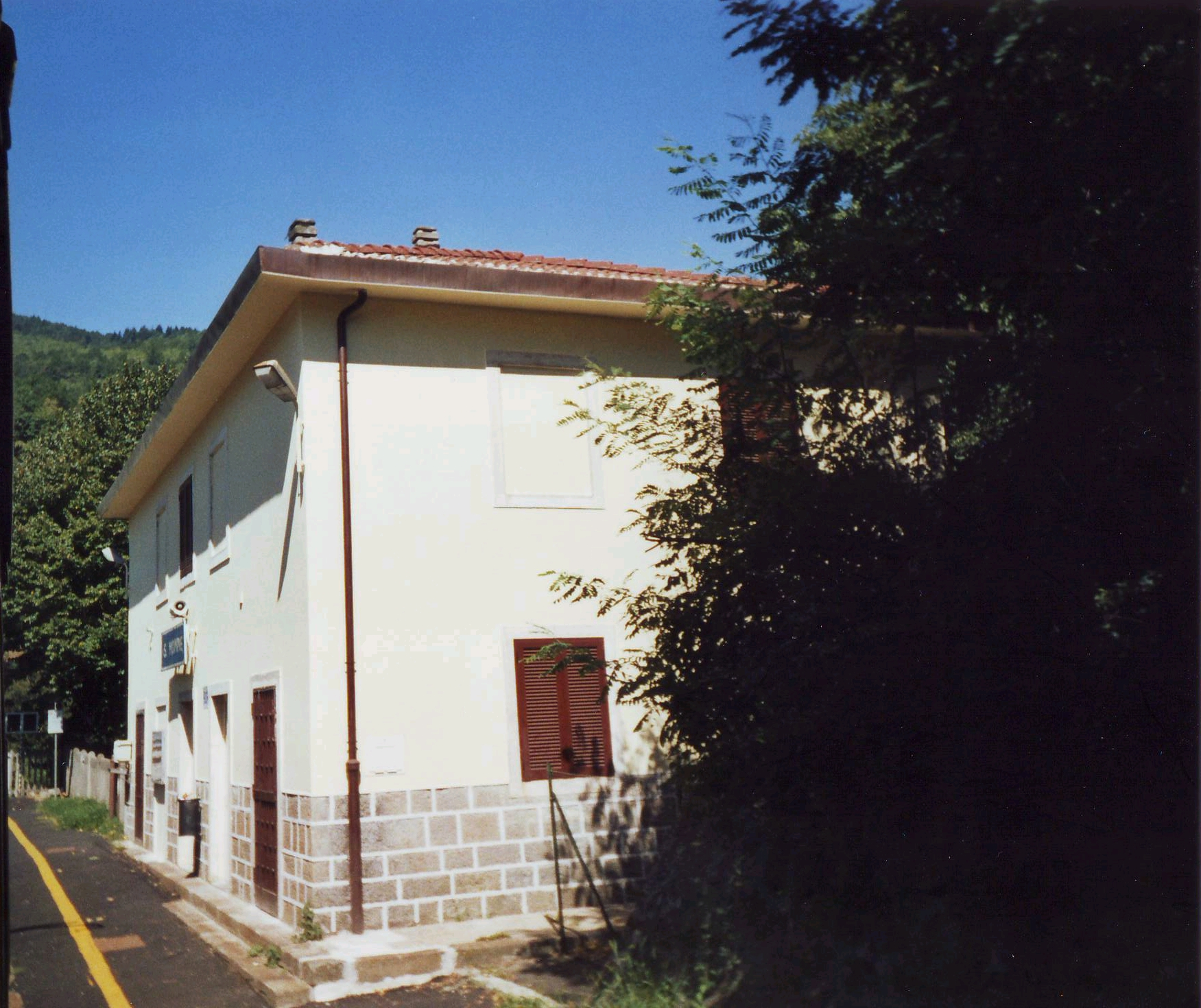
- San Mommè railway station

- Location of San Mommè in Italy
- Coordinates: 44°01′33″N 10°54′29″E
- Country: Italy
- Region: Tuscany
- Province: Pistoia (PT)
- Comune: Pistoia
- Elevation: 555 m (1,821 ft)

Population (2011)
  - Total: 177
- Demonym: Sammommeani
- Time zone: UTC+1 (CET)
  - Summer (DST): UTC+2 (CEST)
- Postal code: 51100
- Dialing code: (+39) 0573
- Patron saint: St. Matthew

San Mommè, also spelled Sammommè, is an Italian village and hamlet (frazione) of the municipality of Pistoia, in the province of Pistoia, Tuscany. In 2011 it had a population of 177.

== Geography ==
The village is located in the Tuscan-Emilian Apennine Mountains, nearby the borders of Emilia-Romagna. It is 11 km from Pracchia, 14 from Pistoia and 22 from Porretta Terme. It is served by a station on the Porrettana railway Bologna-Pistoia.

== Personalities ==
- AG Fronzoni (1923-2002), graphic designer

Ernanni morelli.
