= Paolo Chiavenna =

Italian astronomer

Minor planets discovered: 15
(9796) 1996 HW	April 19, 1996	MPC ^{[A]}
11145 Emanuelli	August 29, 1997	MPC ^{[B]}
15379 Alefranz	August 29, 1997	MPC ^{[B]}
(17614) 1995 UT_{7}	October 27, 1995	MPC ^{[B]}
27900 Cecconi	September 7, 1996	MPC ^{[C]}
(29424) 1997 BV_{4}	January 29, 1997	MPC ^{[D]}
(31254) 1998 DK_{23}	February 27, 1998	MPC ^{[E]}
35270 Molinari	September 7, 1996	MPC ^{[C]}
(37706) 1996 RN	September 8, 1996	MPC ^{[C]}
39734 Marchiori	December 14, 1996	MPC ^{[A]}
55854 Stoppani	November 8, 1996	MPC ^{[E]}
(79382) 1997 GC_{4}	April 8, 1997	MPC ^{[E]}
79472 Chiorny	January 6, 1998	MPC ^{[D]}
(97356) 2000 AY_{27}	January 5, 2000	MPC ^{[D]}
(120679) 1997 BW_{4}	January 29, 1997	MPC ^{[D]}
^{A} with Francesco Manca^{B} with Piero Sicoli^{C} with Valter Giuliani^{D} with Augusto Testa^{E} with Marco Cavagna

Paolo Chiavenna is an Italian amateur astronomer and a co-discoverer of minor planets, credited by the Minor Planet Center with the discovery of 15 minor planets during 1995–2000.

He is an active observer at the Sormano Astronomical Observatory in the north Italian province of Como. The observatory was founded in 1987 and is a member of the GIA (Gruppo Italiano Astrometristi), an Italian association of amateur astronomers who specialize in the observation of minor bodies. Chiavenna's activities there include astrophotography, software development and observation, during the course of which he has made his discoveries, all in collaboration with Francesco Manca, Piero Sicoli, Valter Giuliani, Augusto Testa and Marco Cavagna.
