= Piteglio =

- Frazione
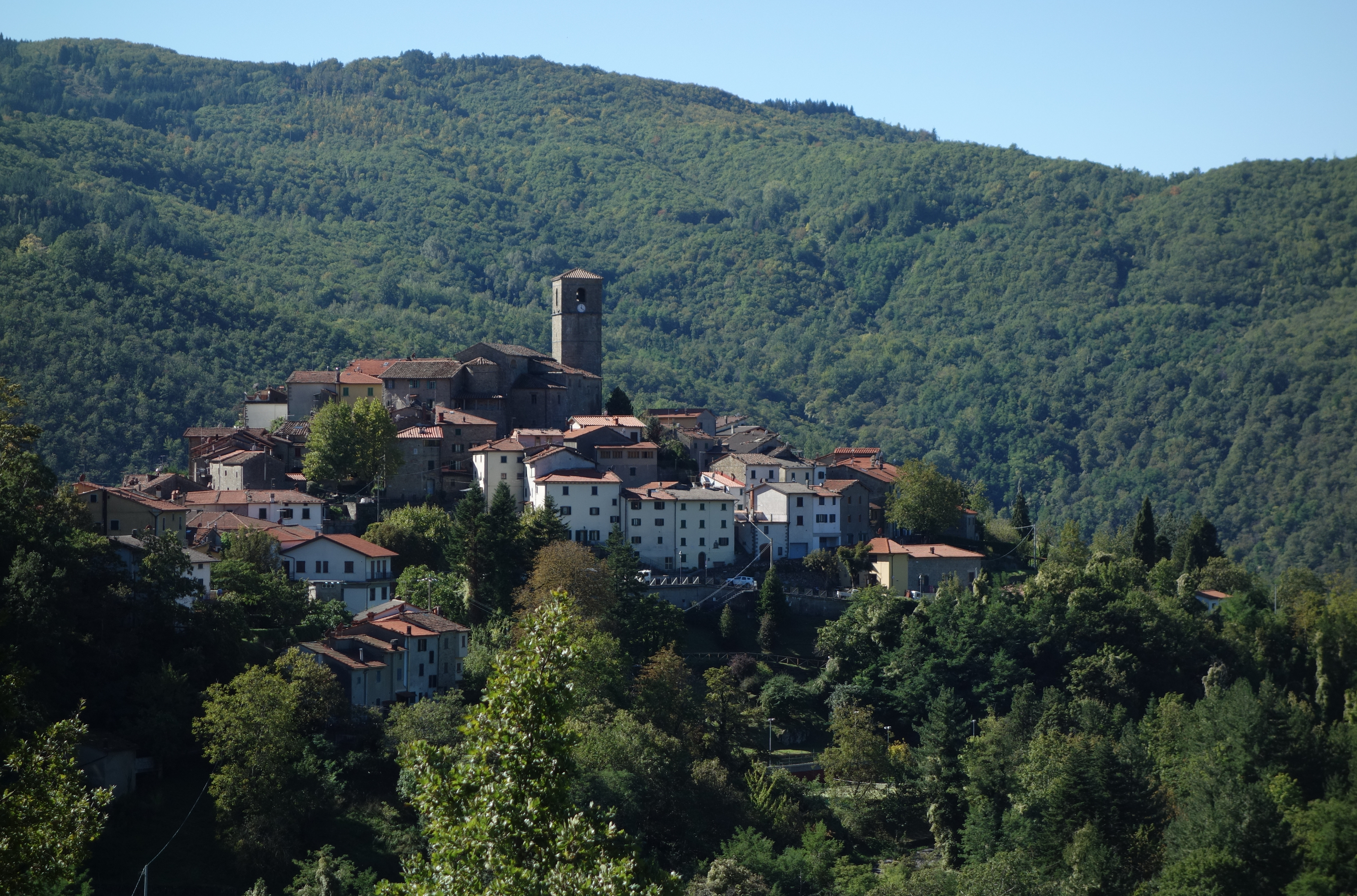

- Location of Piteglio in Italy
- Coordinates: 44°2′N 10°46′E
- Country: Italy
- Region: Tuscany
- Province: Pistoia (PT)
- Comune: San Marcello Piteglio

Area
  - Total: 50.1 km^{2} (19.3 sq mi)
- Elevation: 698 m (2,290 ft)

Population (2007)
  - Total: 1,834
  - Density: 36.6/km^{2} (94.8/sq mi)
- Demonym: Piteglini
- Time zone: UTC+1 (CET)
  - Summer (DST): UTC+2 (CEST)
- Postal code: 51020
- Dialing code: 0573
- Website: Official website

Piteglio was a comune (municipality) in the Province of Pistoia in the Italian region Tuscany, located about 50 kilometres (31 mi) northwest of Florence and about 15 kilometres (9 mi) northwest of Pistoia. It has been a frazione of San Marcello Piteglio since 2017.
