= San Marcello, San Marcello Pistoiese =

Church in Tuscany, Italy

Coordinates: 44.0553°N 10.79160°E

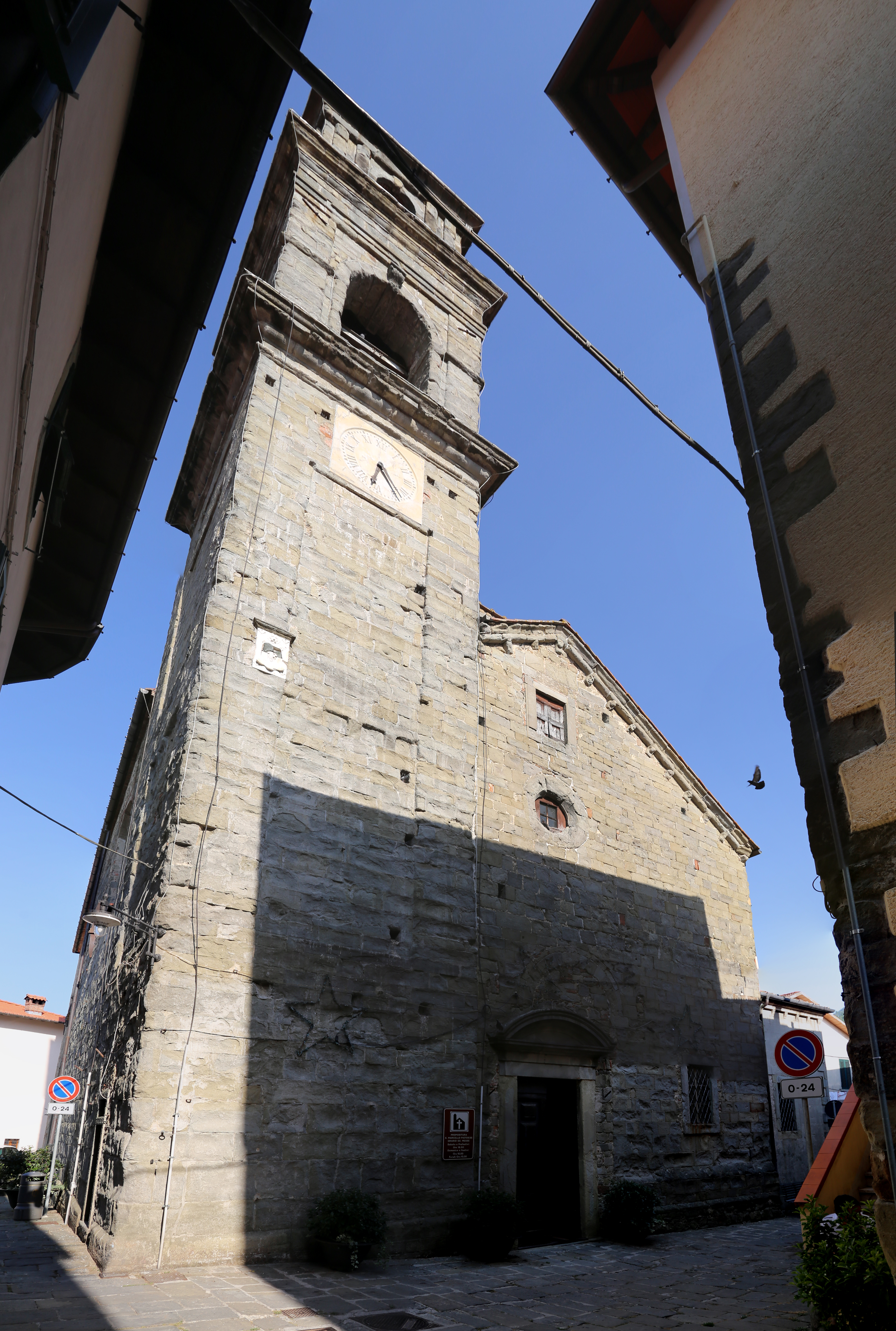
San Marcello church and bell=tower

San Marcello is a Roman Catholic parish church located on Piazza Arcangeli in the town of San Marcello Pistoiese, province of Pistoia, region of Tuscany, Italy.

== History ==
The church is dedicated to the saint Pope Marcellus I (255 – 309). A pieve, or rural paris church, was mentioned in documents from 998 as "curtem de Marcillo"; a document from 1001 in the archives of Pistoia also mentions the church.

The bell-tower and facade may have been erected or incorporated parts of an ancient fortress. In the 17th century, the razing of a church of St Michael in town, aided in the refurbishment of San Marcello. A major reconstruction occurred in 1786-1788 under the guidance of Scipione de' Ricci, the bishop of Pistoia and Prato. This bishop appears to have named a provost in 1784. The interior single nave was refurbished during 1792- 1795, adding the present marble pavement and polychrome windows. The dentral cupola was frescoed by Giuseppe Gricci. He also frescoed a Descent of the Holy Spirit (1788) and the four evangelists in the spandrels.
