= Suspension Bridge of San Marcello Piteglio =

Pedestrian bridge in Italy

Coordinates: 44°03′12″N 10°45′58″E

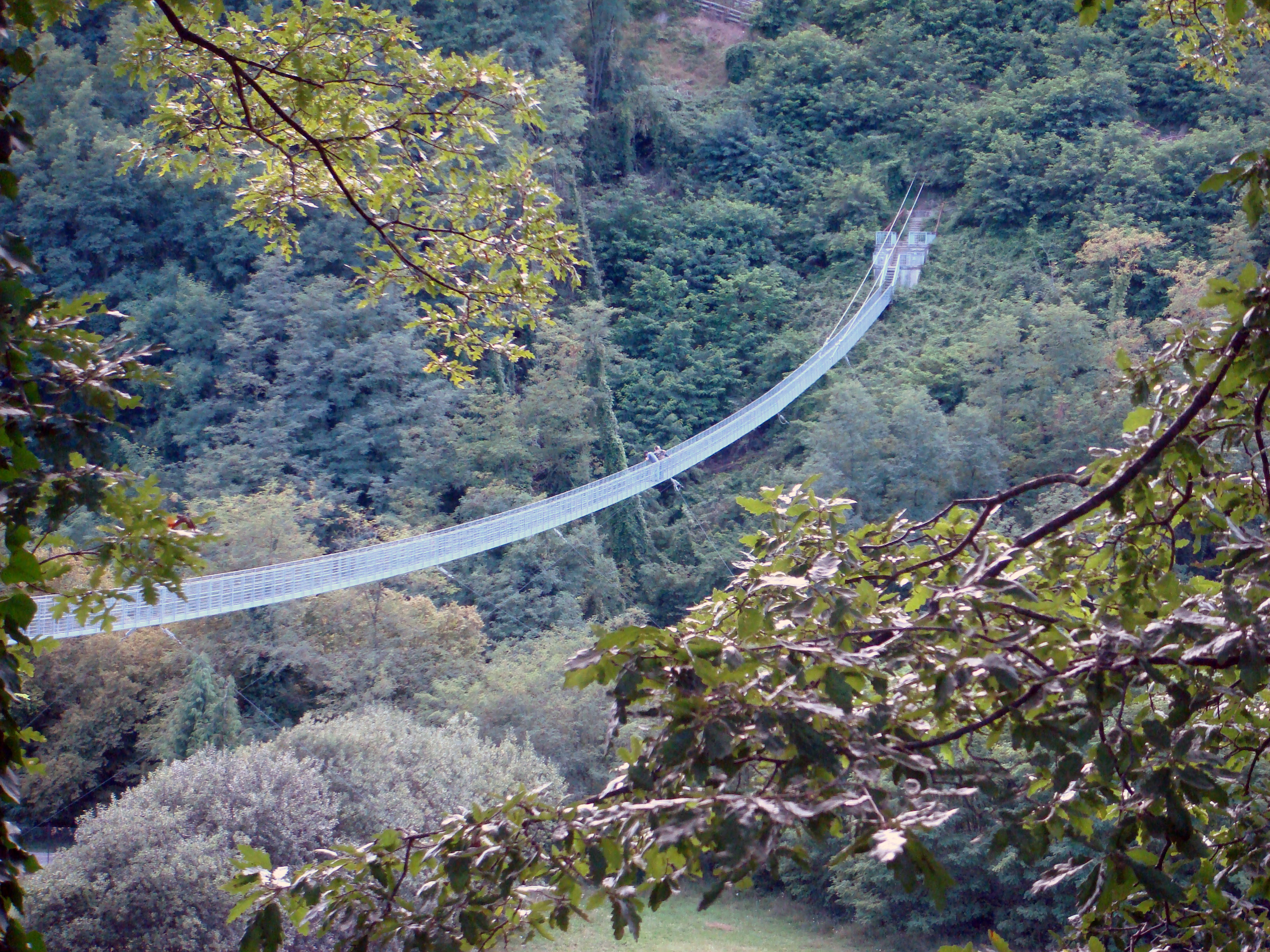
View of bridge from side

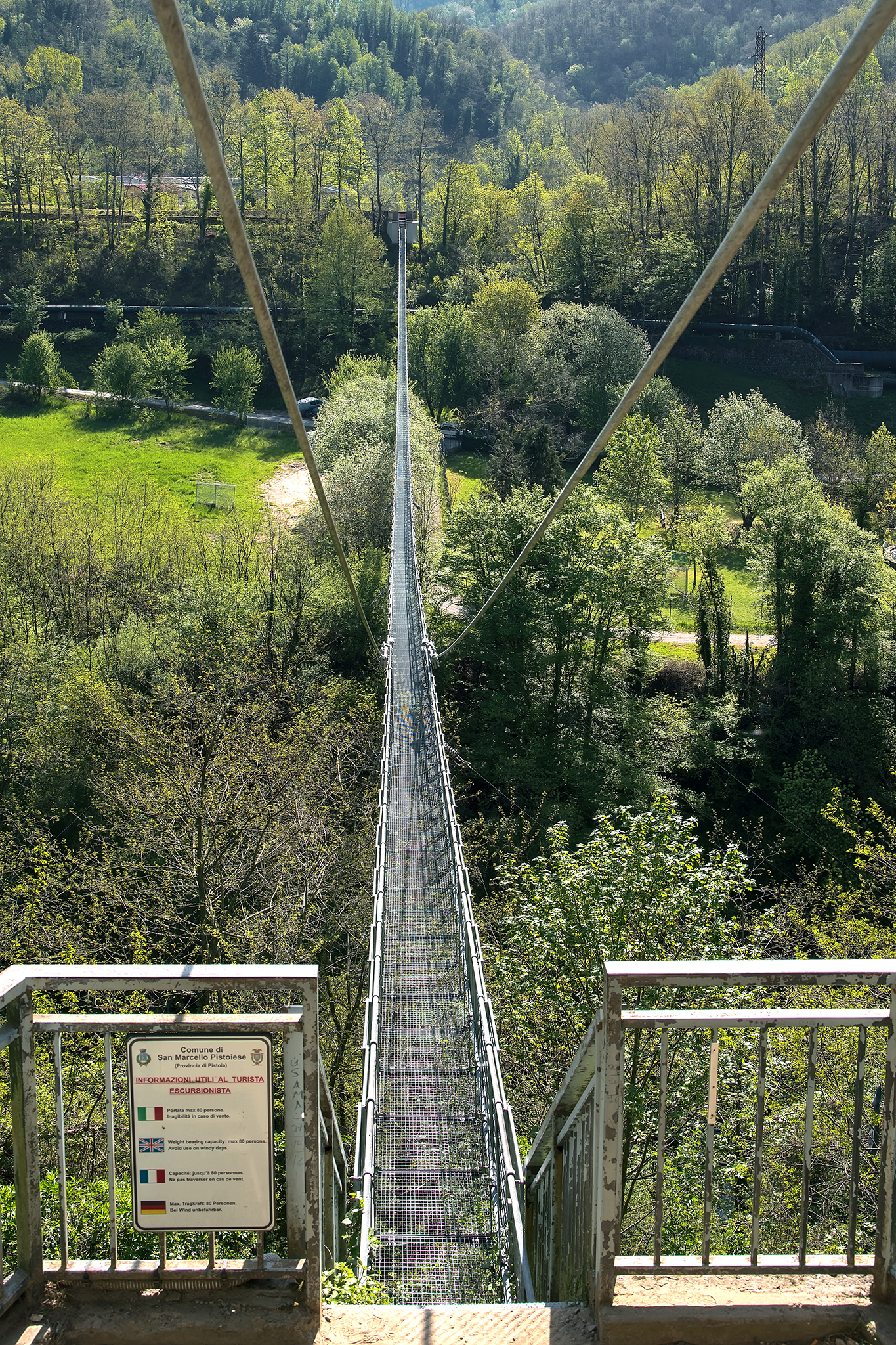
View from one bridgehead

The Suspension Bridge of San Marcello Piteglio (or in Italian, Ponte sospeso di San Marcello Piteglio) is the longest pedestrian suspension bridge or suspension footbridge in Italy, spanning the river Lima between the neighborhoods of Popiglio and Mammiano Basso, both located within the town limits of San Marcello Piteglio, province of Pistoia, region of Tuscany, Italy.

The metal bridge is a pedestrian walkway of nearly 300 meters, built in 1923, to shorten the walk for workers reaching factories on both sides of the river. The construction was patronized by Vicenzo Douglas Scotti, then Count San Giorgino della Scala. The bridge is suspended by four cables and passes over 30 meters above the river. Until 1990, it held the record as the longest such bridge in the world, till it was overtaken by the Kokonoe Yume Bridge in Kokonoe, Ōita, Japan.

The bridge over the Lima has been refurbished and reinforced over the years, lastly in 2004.
