= Monument to Francesco Ferruccio, Gavinana =

Monument to Francesco Ferruccio
- Monumento a Ferrucci a Gavinana
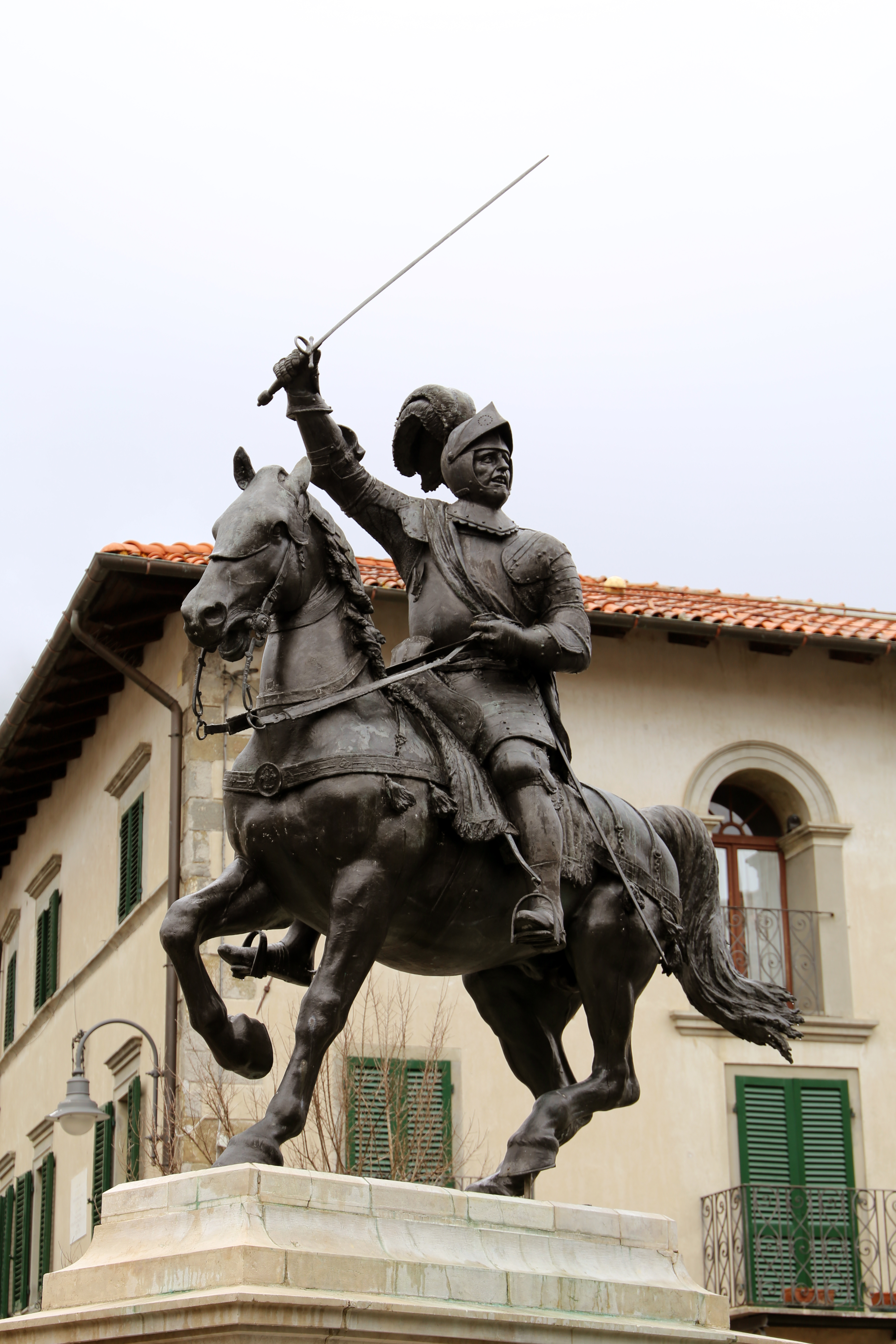
- Equestrian Monument to Francesco Ferruccio
- The location of the monument today Click on the map to see marker.
- Location: Gavinana, region of Tuscany, Italy
- Coordinates: 44°03′20″N 10°49′12″E

The Monument to Francesco Ferruccio is an equestrian statue dedicated to the Florentine military leader (1489–1530), who fought to repel the troops of the Habsburg Holy Roman Emperor Charles V, who had invaded Tuscany. The statue is located in the main central piazza Aiale of the hamlet of Gavinana (frazione of San Marcello Piteglio), province of Pistoia, region of Tuscany, Italy.

The equestrian statue on a plinth was commissioned by the commune of Pescia and designed by Emilio Gallori, who also designed the equestrian monument to Garibaldi on the Janiculum. It represents a confident Ferruccio, dressed in armor. The captain is remembered for carrying out a initially victorious sortie against an imperial detachment led by the Prince of Orange Philibert of Chalon. However, by the end of the day, Ferruccio's troops were routed by reinforcements of landsknecht mercenaries, and the captain was captured and executed. In the 19th century, the brief historical episode was commonly recalled by authors such as Massimo d'Azeglio in Niccolò dei Lapi and Francesco Domenico Guerrazzi in L'Assedio di Firenze, and became emblematic of Italian patriotism and resistance against the foreign occupation of the Italian peninsula. It even continued to be an inspiration in World War I and the battles against Habsburg Austria-Hungary and the Central Powers.
