= Pracchia =

- Frazione
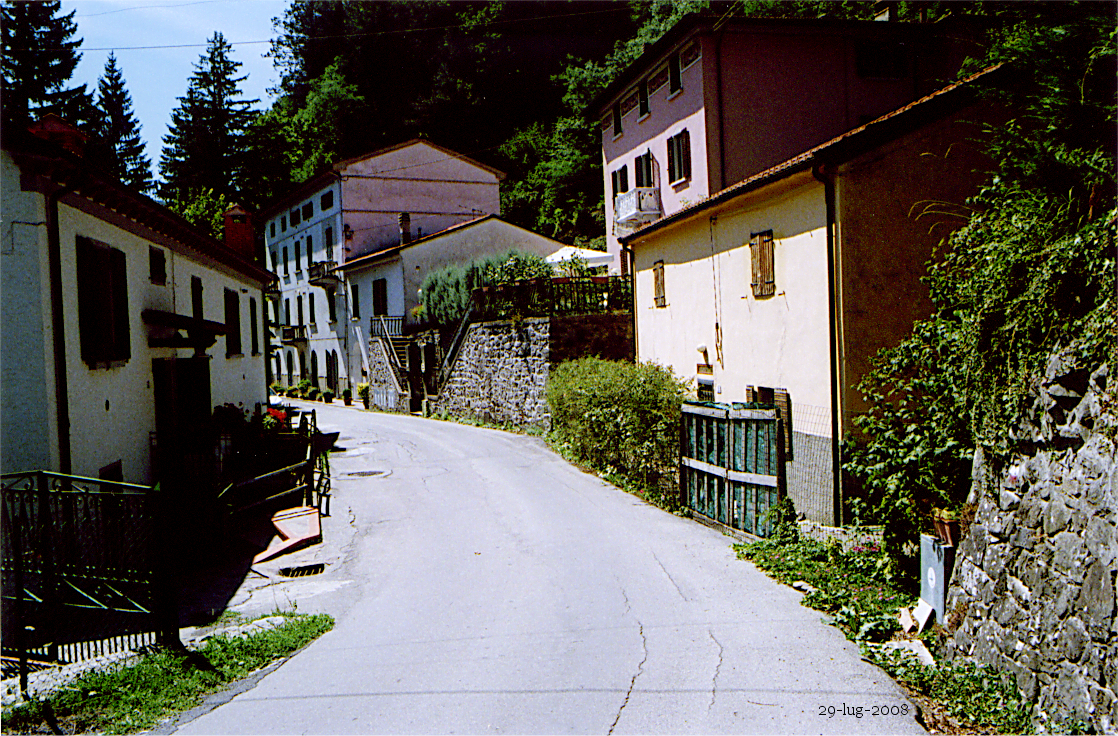
- View of Pracchia Alta

- Location of Pracchia in Italy
- Coordinates: 44°03′21″N 10°54′29″E
- Country: Italy
- Region: Tuscany
- Province: Pistoia (PT)
- Comune: Pistoia
- Elevation: 616 m (2,021 ft)

Population (2011)
  - Total: 268
- Demonym: Pracchiesi
- Time zone: UTC+1 (CET)
  - Summer (DST): UTC+2 (CEST)
- Postal code: 51027
- Dialing code: (+39) 0573
- Patron saint: St. Lawrence
- Website: Official website

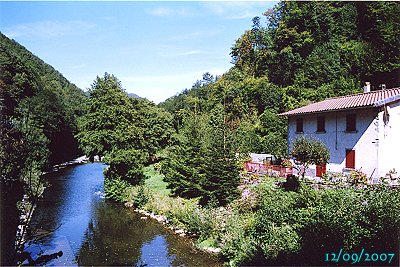
The mill of Setteponti

Pracchia is an Italian village and hamlet (frazione) of the municipality of Pistoia, in the province of Pistoia, Tuscany. In 2011 it had a population of 268.

== History ==
Due to its position, the village hosted a customs between the Grand Duchy of Tuscany and the Papal States. In 1524, the construction of the first blast furnaces to manufacture of iron from Elba island began.

== Geography ==
The village is located in the Tuscan-Emilian Apennine Mountains, lesser than a km from the borders of Emilia-Romagna, between Pistoia (26 km south) and Bologna (81 km north). It is 1 km from Vizzero, 11 from San Mommè, 12 from San Marcello Pistoiese and 16 from Porretta Terme.

The settlement is crossed in the middle by the river Reno, that divides it into "Pracchia Alta" (Upper Pracchia) and "Pracchia Bassa" (Lower Pracchia). North of the village is located a zone named "Setteponti" (Seven Bridges), once known as "Mulino del Pillotti" (Pillotti's Mill), and the seat of the ancient customs.

== Transport ==
The village is served by a station on the Porrettana railway Bologna-Pistoia. It was the junction point of an abandoned narrow-gauge railway, the Ferrovia Alto Pistoiese (FAP) Pracchia-San Marcello Pistoiese-Mammiano, dismantled after 1965.

== Gallery ==
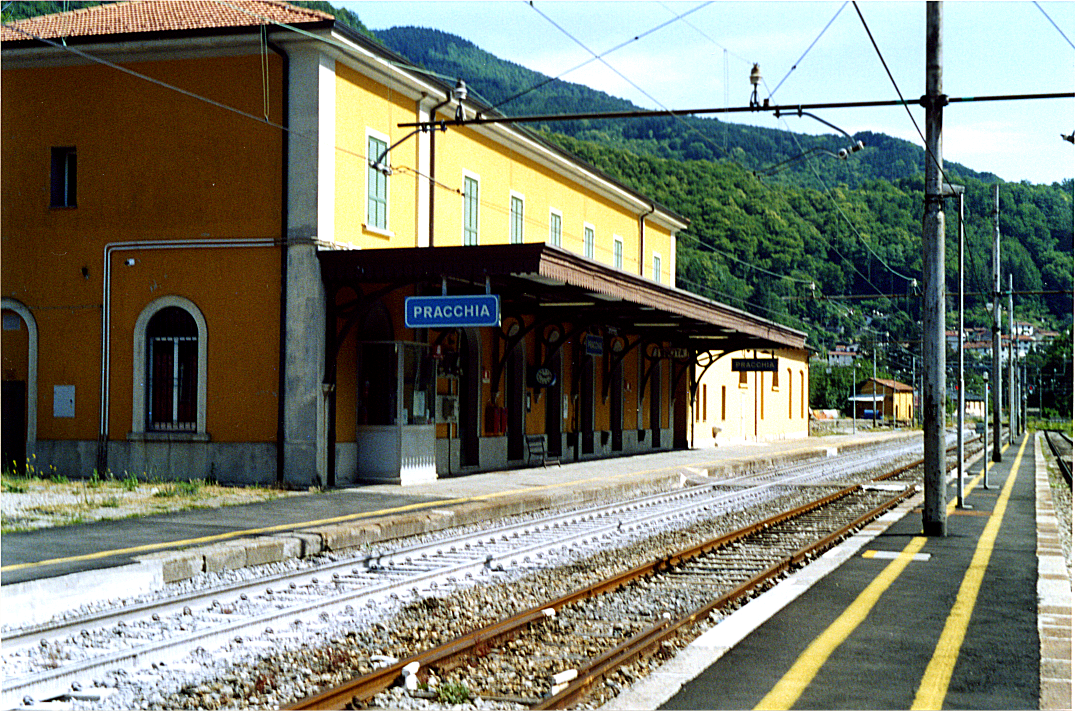
Pracchia railway station (FS)

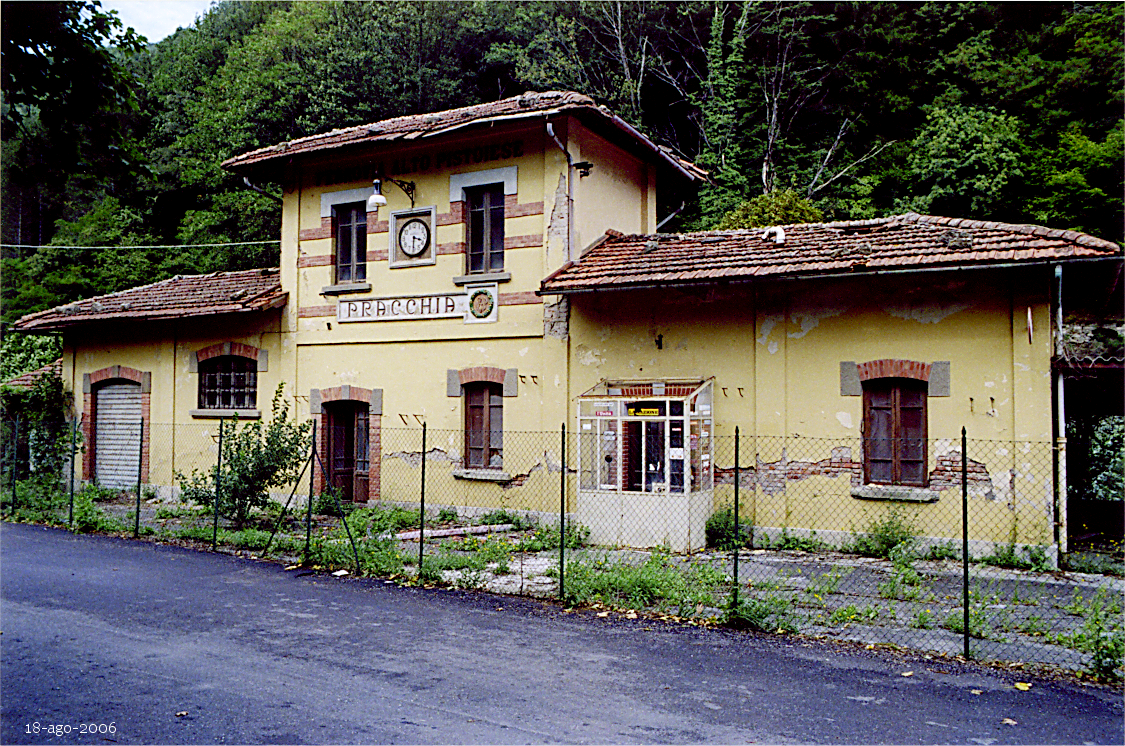
The former Pracchia (FAP) station, in front of the working one

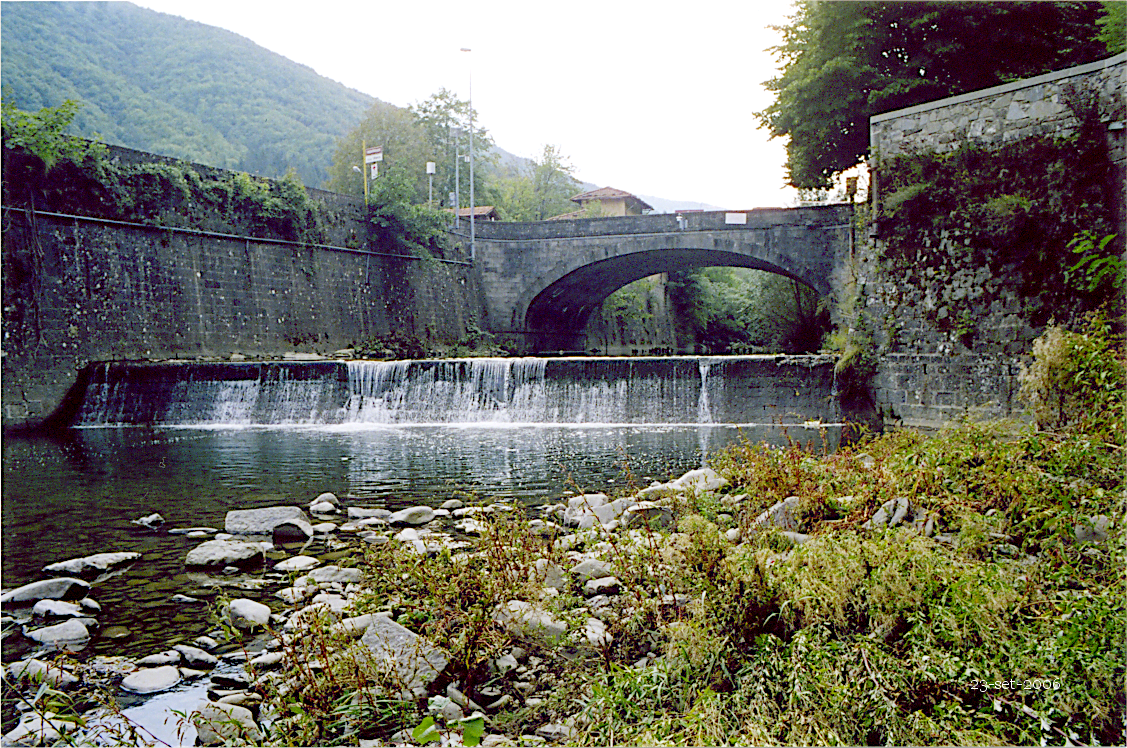
A bridge over the Reno river

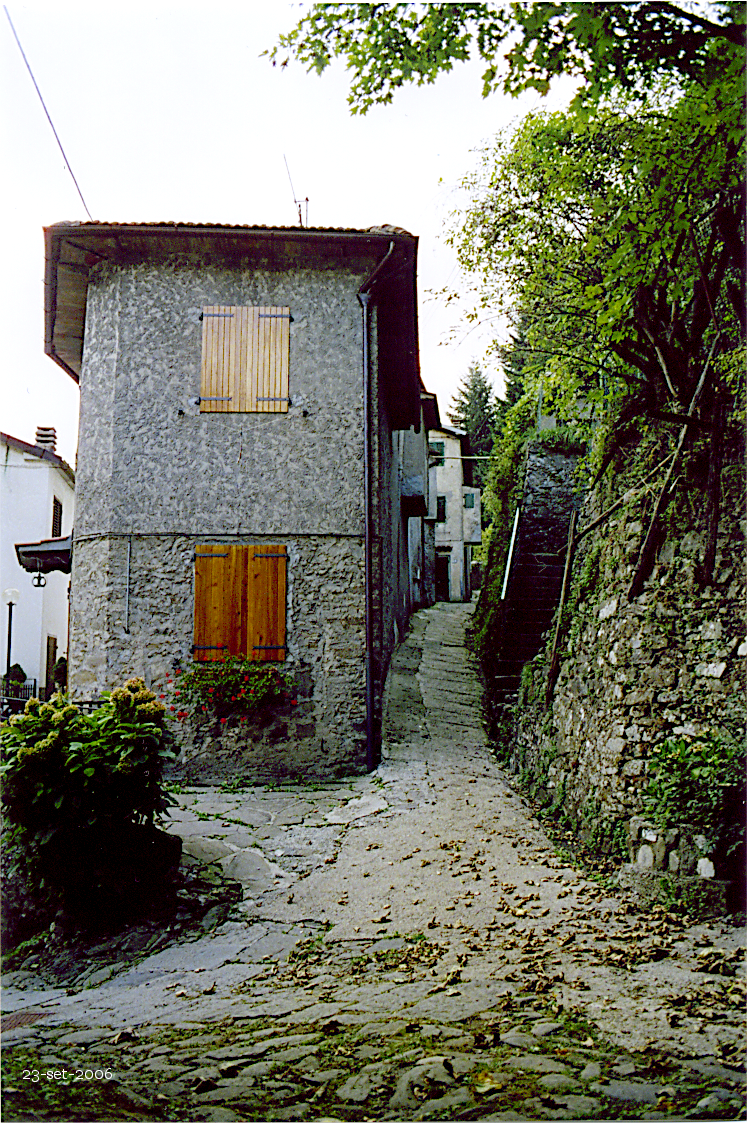
An old house of Pracchia Alta
