= 6882 Sormano =

Main-belt asteroid

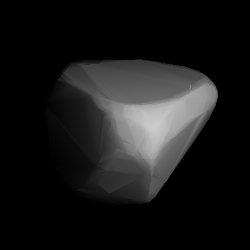
- Shape model of Sormano from its lightcurve

Discovery
- Discovered by: P. Sicoli; V. Giuliani
- Discovery site: Sormano Obs.
- Discovery date: 5 February 1995

Designations
- Named after: Sormano Observatory (discovering observatory)
- Alternative designations: 1995 CC_{1} · 1986 XM_{2} 1989 OW · 1993 OQ
- Minor planet category: main-belt · (middle); Eunomia · Maria

Orbital characteristics
- Epoch 4 September 2017 (JD 2458000.5)
- Uncertainty parameter 0
- Observation arc: 27.85 yr (10,173 days)
- Aphelion: 2.8043 AU
- Perihelion: 2.2997 AU
- Semi-major axis: 2.5520 AU
- Eccentricity: 0.0989
- Orbital period (sidereal): 4.08 yr (1,489 days)
- Mean anomaly: 327.31°
- Mean motion: 0° 14^{m} 30.48^{s} / day
- Inclination: 14.390°
- Longitude of ascending node: 284.19°
- Argument of perihelion: 16.030°

Physical characteristics
- Mean diameter: 6.69 km (calculated); 7.665±0.101 km 8.096±0.040 km
- Synodic rotation period: 3.6901±0.0006 h 3.998344±0.000001 h
- Geometric albedo: 0.21 (assumed); 0.269±0.034; 0.3003±0.0545
- Spectral type: S (family-based)
- Absolute magnitude (H): 12.5 · 12.7 · 12.736±0.003 (R) · 13.19

6882 Sormano (prov. designation: 1995 CC_{1}) is an stony Eunomia asteroid from the middle region of the asteroid belt, approximately 7 kilometers (4.3 miles) in diameter. It was discovered on 5 February 1995, by Italian amateur astronomers Piero Sicoli and Valter Giuliani at Sormano Astronomical Observatory in northern Italy. The asteroid was named for the Italian mountain-village of Sormano and its discovering observatory.

== Orbit and classification ==
Sormano is a member of the Eunomia family, a large group of S-type asteroids and the most prominent family in the intermediate main-belt. It orbits the Sun at a distance of 2.3–2.8 AU once every 4 years and 1 month (1,489 days). Its orbit has an eccentricity of 0.10 and an inclination of 14° with respect to the ecliptic. The asteroid's observation arc begins 6 years prior to its discovery, as it had previously been observed as 1989 OW at Palomar Observatory in 1989.

== Naming ==
This minor planet was named in honor of the Italian mountain-village of Sormano and its discovering nearby observatory. It is funded, built and operated by the "Gruppo Astrofili Brianza", a group of Italian amateur astronomers who have discovered numerous minor planets. The official naming citation was published by the Minor Planet Center on 3 May 1996 (M.P.C. 27130).

== Physical characteristics ==
=== Rotation and shape ===
In September 2010, a rotational lightcurve of Sormano was obtained from photometric observations made at the Palomar Transient Factory in California. It gave a rotation period of 3.6901 hours with a high brightness variation of 0.71 magnitude, indicative of a non-spheroidal shape (U=2). A similar period of 3.998 hours was derived from remodeled data of the Lowell photometric database (n.a.).

=== Diameter and albedo ===
According to the survey carried out by NASA's Wide-field Infrared Survey Explorer with its subsequent NEOWISE mission, Sormano measures 7.6 to 8.0 kilometers in diameter and its surface has an albedo between 0.269 and 0.300. The Collaborative Asteroid Lightcurve Link assumes an albedo 0.21 – derived from 15 Eunomia, the family's largest member and namesake – and calculates a diameter of 6.69 kilometers with an absolute magnitude of 13.19.
