= San Marcello Piteglio =

- Comune
- Comune di San Marcello Piteglio
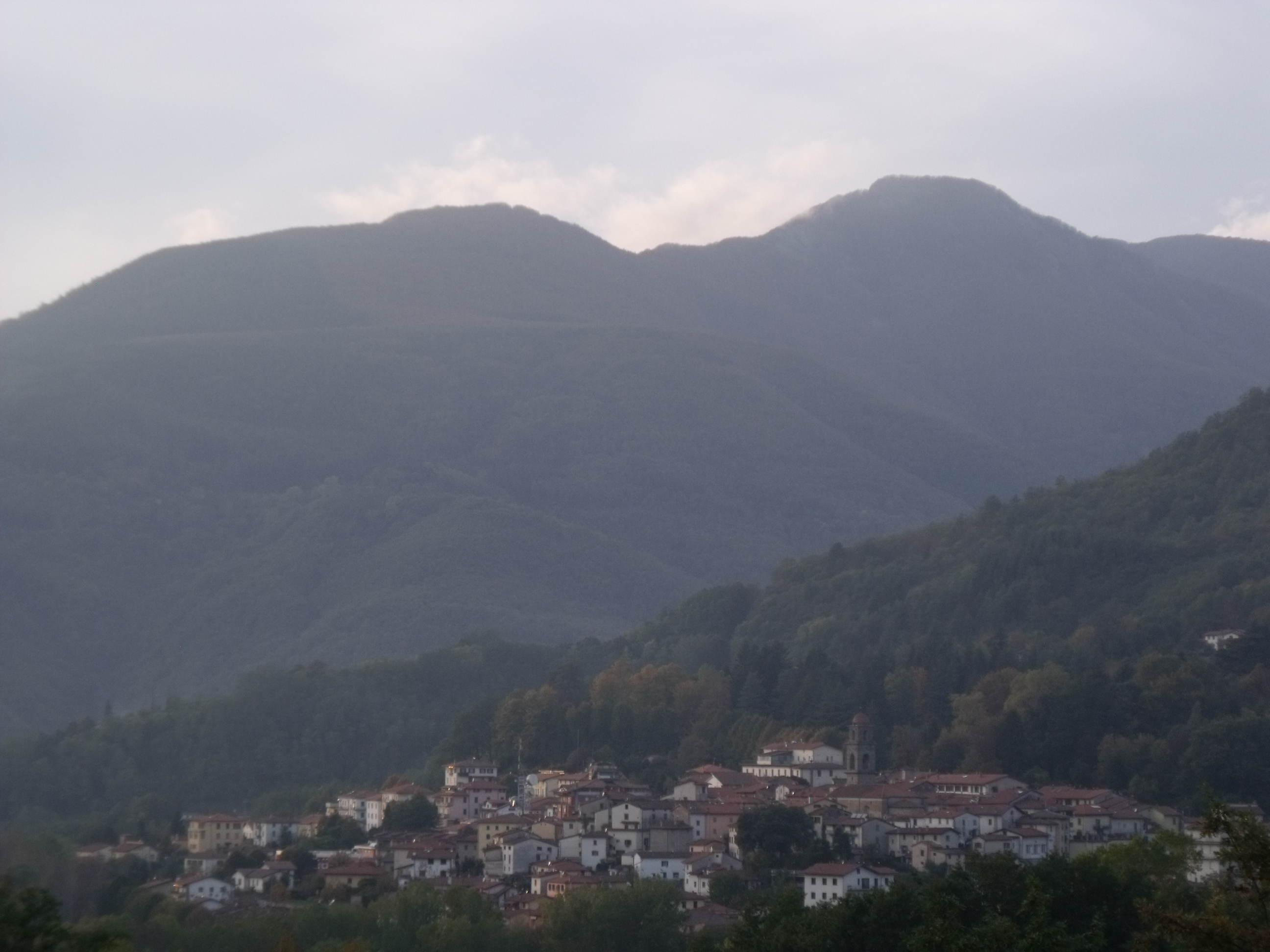
- View of San Marcello Piteglio

- Location within Italy Location within Tuscany
- Coordinates: 44°03′20″N 10°47′27″E
- Country: Italy
- Region: Tuscany
- Province: Pistoia (PT)
- Frazioni: Bardalone, Calamecca, Campo Tizzoro, Crespole, Gavinana, La Lima, Lanciole, Lancisa, Limestre, Lizzano Pistoiese, Lolle, Macchia Antonini, Mammiano, Mammiano Basso, Maresca, Piteglio, Pontepetri, Popiglio, Prataccio, Prunetta, San Marcello Pistoiese (municipal seat), Spignana, Vizzaneta

Government
  - Mayor: Luca Marmo

Area
  - Total: 134.96 km^{2} (52.11 sq mi)
- Elevation: 340 m (1,120 ft)

Population (1 January 2016)
  - Total: 8,099
  - Density: 60.01/km^{2} (155.4/sq mi)
- Time zone: UTC+1 (CET)
  - Summer (DST): UTC+2 (CEST)
- Postal code: 51028
- Dialing code: 0573
- Website: Official website

San Marcello Piteglio is a comune (municipality) in the Province of Pistoia in Tuscany, Italy. It was created in 2016 after the merger of the former communes of San Marcello Pistoiese and Piteglio. The hamlet of Gavinana is notable for the site at which Francesco Ferrucio was captured and executed in the 16th-century, and housing the patriotic 19th-century Equestrian Monument to Ferrucio.

== Science ==
San Marcello is home to the Pistoia Mountains Astronomical Observatory.

== Twin towns ==
- La Güera, Western Sahara
- Saône, France
- Saint-Martin-du-Tertre, France, since 1987
