= Piero Sicoli =

Italian astronomer

- Born: 1954 (age 71–72)
- Occupation: astronomer
- Known for: observing at Sormano Astronomical Observatorydiscoovering
- Notable work: discoverer of minor planets
- Awards: Asteroid 7866 Sicoli named in his honor

Piero Sicoli (born 1954) is an Italian astronomer and discoverer of minor planets, observing at the Italian Sormano Astronomical Observatory.He deals with the history of comets, astrometry and orbit calculations, in particular of objects approaching the Earth. As the observatory's coordinator, he is responsible for close encounters computation of near-Earth objects (NEOs), orbit computations, and identification of asteroids (about one thousand, included 17 NEOs). The Observatory's focus is the examination and tracking of NEOs in Solar System.

The main-belt asteroid 7866 Sicoli, discovered by Edward Bowell at Anderson Mesa Station in 1982, is named in his honor.

Minor planets discovered: 43
see § List of discovered minor planets

== List of discovered minor planets ==
6882 Sormano	5 February 1995	list^{[A]}
8106 Carpino	23 December 1994	list^{[B]}
8208 Volta	28 February 1995	list^{[C]}
8209 Toscanelli	28 February 1995	list^{[C]}
8935 Beccaria	11 January 1997	list^{[B]}
9111 Matarazzo	28 January 1997	list^{[D]}
9115 Battisti	27 February 1997	list^{[D]}
10387 Bepicolombo	18 October 1996	list^{[D]}
11145 Emanuelli	29 August 1997	list^{[E]}
11652 Johnbrownlee	7 February 1997	list^{[D]}

11970 Palitzsch	4 October 1994	list^{[C]}
12410 Donald Duck	26 September 1995	list^{[C]}
13158 Carcano	17 October 1995	list^{[C]}
14024 Procol Harum	9 September 1994	list^{[C]}
14103 Manzoni	1 October 1997	list^{[F]}
15379 Alefranz	29 August 1997	list^{[E]}
16749 Vospini	16 August 1996	list^{[A]}
(17614) 1995 UT_{7}	27 October 1995	list^{[E]}
18556 Battiato	7 February 1997	list^{[D]}
19398 Creedence	2 March 1998	list^{[C]}

22500 Grazianoventre	26 July 1997	list^{[F]}
26197 Bormio	31 March 1997	list^{[D]}
31244 Guidomonzino	19 February 1998	list^{[F]}
32931 Ferioli	26 September 1995	list^{[C]}
32944 Gussalli	19 November 1995	list^{[D]}
(33049) 1997 UF_{5}	25 October 1997	list^{[F]}
35316 Monella	11 January 1997	list^{[B]}
35334 Yarkovsky	31 March 1997	list^{[D]}
39653 Carnera	17 October 1995	list^{[C]}
43956 Elidoro	7 February 1997	list^{[D]}

43957 Invernizzi	7 February 1997	list^{[D]}
43993 Mariola	26 July 1997	list^{[F]}
46691 Ghezzi	30 January 1997	list^{[A]}
48640 Eziobosso	17 October 1995	list^{[C]}
48643 Allen-Beach	20 October 1995	list^{[D]}
55810 Fabiofazio	4 October 1994	list^{[C]}
59087 Maccacaro	15 November 1998	list^{[D]}
(69573) 1998 BQ_{26}	28 January 1998	list^{[F]}
69961 Millosevich	15 November 1998	list^{[D]}
(96583) 1998 VG_{34}	15 November 1998	list^{[D]}

(155410) 1996 CE_{2}	15 February 1996	list^{[C]}
(173146) 1995 UM	17 October 1995	list^{[C]}
(219091) 1998 RF_{3}	15 September 1998	list^{[F]}
Co-discovery made with:^{A} V. Giuliani^{B} M. Cavagna^{C} P. Ghezzi^{D} F. Manca^{E} P. Chiavenna^{F} A. Testa

== Publications ==
- "The orbit of (944) Hidalgo", British Astron. Assoc. Jnl., (1990, M. Cavagna, P. Sicoli)
- "Future Earth Approaches of (4179) Toutatis", Minor Planet Bulletin, (1992, M. Cavagna, P. Sicoli)
- "Earth Close Approaches of Minor Planet (7482) 1994 PC1", Minor Planet Bulletin, (1997, P. Sicoli)
- "Asteroid and Planet Close Encounters", Minor Planet Bulletin, (1999, F. Manca, P. Sicoli)
- "Monitoring Hazardous Objects", Proceedings of the Third Italian Meeting of Planetary Science, (2000, F. Manca, P. Sicoli)
- "Giuseppe Piazzi and the Discovery of Ceres", Asteroids III, (2002, G. Fodera' Serio, A. Manara, P. Sicoli)
- "Planetary Close Encounters", Proceedings of the Fourth Italian Meeting of Planetary Science, (2002, F. Manca, P. Sicoli)
- "Killed by a meteorite?", Mercury, (2003, P. Sicoli, C.J. Cunningham)
- "Identification of asteroids and comets: methods and results", Proceedings of the X National Conference on Planetary Science. (2011, F. Manca, P. Sicoli, and A. Testa)
- "Comets and Political anxieties in the first half of the Ninth Century: New Light on Comets X/839 B1 and X/841 Y1". Journal of Astronomical History and Heritage, 25(2), 213–226 (2022, P. Sicoli, M. Cesario, R. Gorelli)
- "New and improved orbits of historical comets: Late 4th and 5th century" ICARUS Volume 384, 15 September 2022, 115112 (M.J. Martínez, F.J. Marco, P. Sicoli, R. Gorelli)
- "Did 1P/ Halley have an outburst in 990 AD?". THE COMET’S TALE Comet Section – British Astronomical Association, Journal – Number 41 2022 June (P. Sicoli, R. Gorelli)
- "Medieval Comets European and Middle Eastern Perspective". Universitat Politècnica de València. (2023, P. Sicoli, R. Gorelli, M.J. Martínez Uso, F.J. Marco) https://doi.org/10.4995/SCCIE.2023.666301
- "New and improved orbits of some historical comets: 6TH and 7TH centuries". ICARUS Volume 420, 15 September 2024, 116165 (P. Sicoli, R. Gorelli, M.J. Martínez, F.J. Marco)
- "Comete nell'Italia antica e medievale" Book Edit. LED Bibliotheca (2024, P. Sicoli)
