= Luciano Tesi =

Italian veterinarian and amateur astronomer

- Born: 10 December 1931 (age 94); Monsummano Terme, Italy
- Occupations: veterinarian, amateur astronomer
- Known for: discovery of minor planets

Luciano Tesi (Italian pronunciation: [luˈtʃaːno ˈteːzi]; born 10 December 1931) is an Italian veterinarian, amateur astronomer, discoverer of many minor planets, and director of the San Marcello Pistoiese Observatory.

In 1980, he founded the "Amateur Group of Pistoiese Mountain" (Italian: Gruppo Astrofili Montagna Pistoiese). Later on, this resulted in the construction of the Pistoia Mountains Astronomical Observatory. As the director of the observatory, he has collaborated with many discoverers in following up near-Earth objects and in finding minor planets since 1994.

The near-Earth object and Amor asteroid, 15817 Lucianotesi, discovered by Andrea Boattini and Maura Tombelli at San Marcello Pistoiese in 1994, was named in his honor.

== Discoveries ==
Minor planets discovered: 191
see § List of discovered minor planets

Luciano Tesi is credited by the Minor Planet Center (MPC) with the discovery of many numbered minor planets since 1994 (see table), mostly in collaboration with several other astronomers. Together with Giancarlo Fagioli, he also discovered the main-belt asteroid 280641 Edosara, which was erroneously credited to "T. esi" by the MPC. Co-discoveries made by Tesi/Fagioli appear as 3 separate records in the MPC's List of "Minor Planet Discoverers".

=== List of discovered minor planets ===
7787 Annalaura	23 November 1994	list^{[A]}
7801 Goretti	12 April 1996	list^{[A]}
8051 Pistoria	13 August 1997	list^{[B]}
8558 Hack	1 August 1995	list^{[A]}
9904 Mauratombelli	29 July 1997	list^{[A]}
10219 Penco	25 October 1997	list^{[A]}
10371 Gigli	27 February 1995	list^{[A]}
10584 Ferrini	14 April 1996	list^{[A]}
10642 Charmaine	19 January 1999	list^{[A]}
11102 Bertorighini	26 September 1995	list
11359 Piteglio	27 January 1998	list^{[C]}
11595 Monsummano	23 May 1995	list^{[A]}
11605 Ranfagni	19 October 1995	list^{[A]}
11622 Samuele	9 September 1996	list^{[A]}
11625 Francelinda	20 October 1996	list^{[B]}
11667 Testa	19 October 1997	list^{[A]}
12399 Bartolini	19 July 1995	list^{[A]}
12840 Paolaferrari	6 April 1997	list^{[B]}
12927 Pinocchio	30 September 1999	list^{[D]}
13150 Paolotesi	23 March 1995	list^{[A]}
13200 Romagnani	13 March 1997	list^{[B]}
13223 Cenaceneri	13 August 1997	list
13250 Danieladucato	19 July 1998	list^{[A]}
13704 Aletesi	13 August 1998	list
13798 Cecchini	15 November 1998	list^{[A]}

14186 Virgiliofos	7 December 1998	list^{[A]}
14486 Tuscia	4 October 1994	list^{[B]}
14964 Robertobacci	2 November 1996	list^{[B]}
15034 Décines	16 November 1998	list^{[D]}
15041 Paperetti	8 December 1998	list^{[A]}
15460 Manca	25 December 1998	list^{[A]}
(15478) 1999 CZ_{2}	7 February 1999	list^{[A]}
(16152) 1999 YN_{12}	30 December 1999	list^{[D]}
16683 Alepieri	3 May 1994	list^{[B]}
16744 Antonioleone	23 July 1996	list
16797 Wilkerson	7 February 1997	list^{[A]}
17056 Boschetti	6 April 1999	list^{[A]}
21269 Bechini	6 June 1996	list^{[A]}
23547 Tognelli	17 February 1994	list^{[B]}
(23589) 1995 UR_{6}	23 October 1995	list^{[A]}
24818 Menichelli	23 November 1994	list^{[A]}
24969 Lucafini	13 February 1998	list^{[A]}
(24996) 1998 OD_{1}	20 July 1998	list^{[E]}
25601 Francopacini	1 January 2000	list^{[D]}
26177 Fabiodolfi	12 April 1996	list^{[A]}
26356 Aventini	26 December 1998	list^{[A]}
26498 Dinotina	4 February 2000	list^{[A]}
27270 Guidotti	2 January 2000	list^{[F]}
27917 Edoardo	6 November 1996	list^{[B]}
27959 Fagioli	19 September 1997	list

27977 Distratis	25 October 1997	list^{[A]}
29353 Manu	19 July 1995	list^{[A]}
29443 Remocorti	13 July 1997	list^{[B]}
29672 Salvo	12 December 1998	list^{[A]}
29705 Cialucy	26 December 1998	list^{[A]}
29706 Simonetta	25 December 1998	list^{[A]}
31414 Rotarysusa	14 January 1999	list^{[A]}
31458 Delrosso	15 February 1999	list^{[A]}
32938 Ivanopaci	15 October 1995	list^{[A]}
33010 Enricoprosperi	11 March 1997	list^{[B]}
33480 Bartolucci	4 April 1999	list^{[D]}
33532 Gabriellacoli	18 April 1999	list^{[A]}
34716 Guzzo	14 August 2001	list^{[A]}
34717 Mirkovilli	14 August 2001	list^{[A]}
34718 Cantagalli	14 August 2001	list^{[A]}
35358 Lorifini	27 September 1997	list^{[D]}
35461 Mazzucato	26 February 1998	list^{[A]}
36446 Cinodapistoia	22 August 2000	list^{[A]}
38020 Hannadam	17 June 1998	list^{[A]}
39678 Ammannito	12 June 1996	list^{[A]}
39748 Guccini	28 January 1997	list^{[B]}
39849 Giampieri	13 February 1998	list^{[A]}
42523 Ragazzileonardo	6 March 1994	list^{[B]}
42614 Ubaldina	2 March 1998	list^{[F]}
42929 Francini	8 October 1999	list^{[G]}

43193 Secinaro	1 January 2000	list^{[A]}
43882 Maurivicoli	7 March 1995	list^{[A]}
44574 Lavoratti	4 April 1999	list^{[D]}
46644 Lagia	19 July 1995	list^{[A]}
46720 Pierostroppa	13 August 1997	list^{[A]}
(46815) 1998 MG_{3}	21 June 1998	list^{[A]}
(49340) 1998 WG	16 November 1998	list^{[A]}
49987 Bonata	3 January 2000	list^{[G]}
(50537) 2000 EH_{14}	3 March 2000	list^{[D]}
54852 Mercatali	22 July 2001	list^{[D]}
54967 Millucci	15 August 2001	list^{[A]}
55196 Marchini	11 September 2001	list^{[A]}
55418 Bianciardi	13 October 2001	list^{[D]}
(55828) 1995 UN_{6}	16 October 1995	list^{[A]}
57140 Gaddi	15 August 2001	list^{[A]}
58709 Zenocolò	14 February 1998	list^{[G]}
(59114) 1998 XQ_{2}	7 December 1998	list^{[A]}
(59384) 1999 FH_{10}	22 March 1999	list^{[A]}
59417 Giocasilli	5 April 1999	list^{[A]}
60406 Albertosuci	3 February 2000	list^{[A]}
63463 Calamandrei	20 July 2001	list^{[D]}
67070 Rinaldi	1 January 2000	list^{[A]}
70444 Genovali	9 October 1999	list^{[D]}
70744 Maffucci	9 November 1999	list^{[G]}
(71221) 1999 YL_{9}	31 December 1999	list^{[D]}

71489 Dynamocamp	4 February 2000	list^{[D]}
(75238) 1999 WC_{9}	29 November 1999	list^{[A]}
(75887) 2000 CS_{34}	4 February 2000	list^{[D]}
(77464) 2001 HV_{16}	22 April 2001	list^{[A]}
79212 Martadigrazia	6 March 1994	list^{[B]}
(79523) 1998 OC_{1}	20 July 1998	list^{[A]}
80008 Danielarhodes	4 April 1999	list^{[A]}
(82454) 2001 OT_{12}	21 July 2001	list^{[A]}
82463 Mluigiaborsi	21 July 2001	list^{[G]}
82638 Bottariclaudio	7 August 2001	list^{[D]}
82927 Ferrucci	25 August 2001	list^{[A]}
(85439) 1997 EP_{40}	13 March 1997	list^{[B]}
86195 Cireglio	30 September 1999	list^{[G]}
(86375) 2000 AT_{2}	1 January 2000	list^{[D]}
(86376) 2000 AX_{4}	2 January 2000	list^{[A]}
89735 Tommei	4 January 2002	list^{[A]}
(91146) 1998 OA_{1}	20 July 1998	list^{[D]}
91214 Diclemente	23 December 1998	list^{[A]}
(91900) 1999 VV_{11}	5 November 1999	list^{[D]}
92279 Bindiluca	22 February 2000	list
(94634) 2001 WQ_{14}	21 November 2001	list^{[D]}
99389 Marconovi	5 January 2002	list^{[D]}
(100730) 1998 CE_{2}	13 February 1998	list^{[A]}
100897 Piatra Neamt	5 May 1998	list^{[F]}
(101534) 1998 YC_{10}	25 December 1998	list^{[A]}

103421 Laurmatt	6 January 2000	list^{[G]}
108205 Baccipaolo	26 April 2001	list^{[G]}
(108950) 2001 PS_{28}	14 August 2001	list^{[A]}
(109658) 2001 RZ_{10}	11 September 2001	list^{[A]}
121546 Straulino	5 November 1999	list^{[A]}
135041 Lorenzofranco	21 July 2001	list^{[D]}
137082 Maurobachini	12 December 1998	list^{[G]}
(137117) 1999 BK_{4}	19 January 1999	list^{[A]}
(139231) 2001 HW_{16}	22 April 2001	list^{[D]}
144303 Mirellabreschi	16 February 2004	list^{[H]}
(146017) 2000 CX_{120}	5 February 2000	list^{[A]}
(148206) 2000 CL_{97}	13 February 2000	list^{[D]}
(150238) 1998 YG_{9}	23 December 1998	list^{[A]}
(150712) 2001 QD	16 August 2001	list^{[A]}
(150713) 2001 QF	16 August 2001	list^{[D]}
152583 Saône	4 October 1994	list^{[B]}
(155923) 2001 PB_{14}	14 August 2001	list^{[A]}
(155926) 2001 PE_{29}	15 August 2001	list^{[D]}
(159421) 1999 TN_{10}	8 October 1999	list^{[D]}
(165912) 2001 TE_{7}	11 October 2001	list^{[D]}
172734 Giansimon	10 February 2004	list^{[H]}
(173230) 1998 XM	6 December 1998	list^{[A]}
(175771) 1998 XO_{2}	7 December 1998	list^{[A]}
181494 Forestale	16 October 2006	list^{[J]}
(181312) 2006 QV_{39}	24 August 2006	list^{[A]}

(181722) 1995 CU	1 February 1995	list^{[A]}
(181734) 1995 UQ_{6}	23 October 1995	list^{[A]}
(185990) 2001 OS_{12}	21 July 2001	list^{[A]}
(189087) 2001 PE_{15}	13 August 2001	list^{[A]}
191582 Kikadolfi	20 December 2003	list^{[H]}
(192573) 1998 XL	6 December 1998	list^{[A]}
193818 Polidoro	16 August 2001	list^{[G]}
198616 Lucabracali	14 January 2005	list^{[H]}
(205006) 1997 AY_{21}	15 January 1997	list^{[B]}
207657 Mangiantini	1 August 2007	list^{[H]}
(208135) 2000 EF_{15}	2 March 2000	list^{[A]}
210414 Gebartolomei	3 December 2007	list^{[H]}
214715 Silvanofuso	10 October 2006	list^{[H]}
214953 Giugavazzi	29 November 2007	list^{[H]}
216345 Savigliano	4 December 2007	list^{[J]}
(219829) 2002 CR_{39}	7 February 2002	list^{[D]}
234026 Unioneastrofili	23 September 1998	list
235999 Bucciantini	4 April 2005	list^{[H]}
236784 Livorno	12 August 2007	list^{[I]}
(241611) 1999 TO_{10}	8 October 1999	list^{[A]}
(246893) 1997 OB_{1}	29 July 1997	list^{[A]}
(247208) 2001 PN_{28}	13 August 2001	list^{[A]}
248866 Margherita	17 October 2006	list^{[I]}
280641 Edosara	6 January 2005	list^{[H]}
280652 Aimaku	2 February 2005	list^{[H]}
283057 Casteldipiazza	24 July 2008	list^{[H]}

283461 Leacipaola	14 August 2001	list
289608 Wanli	4 April 2005	list^{[H]}
296928 Francescopalla	17 February 1994	list^{[B]}
299134 Moggicecchi	10 March 2005	list^{[H]}
300226 Francocanepari	13 December 2006	list^{[H]}
309704 Baruffetti	29 March 2008	list^{[H]}
(313036) 2000 PL	2 August 2000	list^{[D]}
314808 Martindutertre	15 October 2006	list^{[H]}
315046 Gianniferrari	13 February 2007	list^{[H]}
319651 Topografo	10 October 2006	list^{[I]}
(334068) 2001 PP_{28}	13 August 2001	list^{[A]}
(337429) 2001 RL_{16}	10 September 2001	list^{[A]}
343057 Lucaravenni	15 February 2009	list^{[H]}
345720 Monte Vigese	12 December 2005	list^{[I]}
345763 Pompiere	13 March 2007	list^{[I]}
(347537) 1999 YY_{13}	31 December 1999	list^{[G]}
(363124) 2001 PO_{28}	13 August 2001	list^{[D]}
364264 Martymartina	11 October 2006	list^{[H]}
379130 Lopresti	15 February 2009	list^{[H]}
(390534) 1998 TA_{2}	13 October 1998	list
395124 Astonepia	10 December 2009	list^{[H]}
396931 Nerliluca	4 April 2005	list
470324 Debbanci	16 August 2007	list^{[H]}
475696 Fisiocritico	13 November 2006	list^{[I]}
Co-discovery made with:^{A} A. Boattini^{B} G. Cattani^{C} V. Cecchini^{D} M. Tombelli^{E} V. Goretti^{F} A. Caronia^{G} G. Forti^{H} G. Fagioli^{I} M. Mazzucato

== See also ==
- List of minor planet discoverers § L. Tesi
