= Sormano Astronomical Observatory =

Sormano Astronomical Observatory Osservatorio Astronomico Sormano
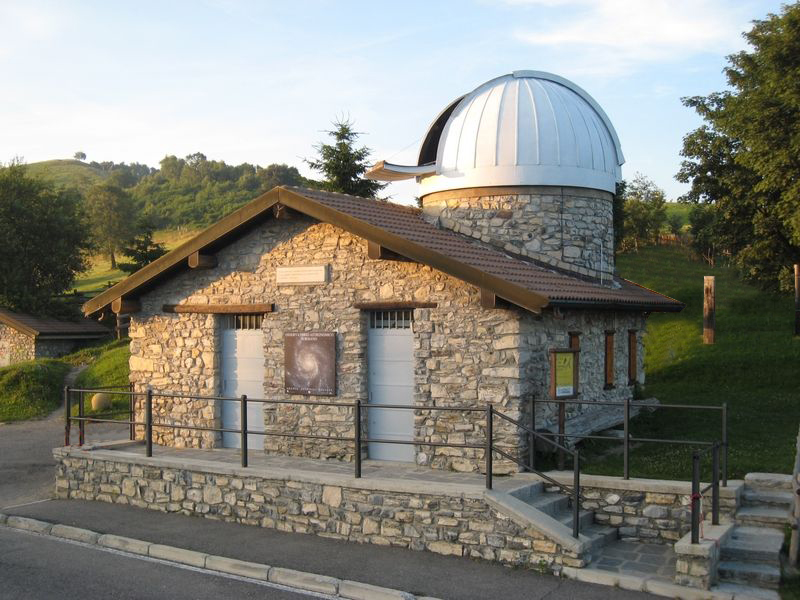
- Sormano Astronomical Observatory
- Organization: Gruppo Astrofili Brianza
- Observatory code: 587
- Location: Sormano, Italy
- Coordinates: 45°52′59″N 9°13′45″E
- Altitude: 1,128 meters (3,701 ft)
- Established: 1986
- Website: Osservatorio A. Sormano

Telescopes
- Cavagna Telescope: 0.5 m Ritchey–Chrétien
- unnamed: 0.172 m Maksutov telescope
- Related media on Commons

The Sormano Astronomical Observatory (Italian: Osservatorio Astronomico Sormano, obs. code: 587) is an astronomical observatory north of Milan, Italy. Located near the Swiss border at 1000 meters elevation at the mountain village of Sormano in the pre-Alps, the observatory was privately funded by the Gruppo Astrofili Brianza and built in 1986.

== Description ==
The observatory is known for its astrometric observations of minor planets and comets in the Solar System. After its first light in January 1989, several amateur astronomers such as Marco Cavagna, Valter Giuliani, Piero Sicoli, Pierangelo Ghezzi, Francesco Manca, Paolo Chiavenna, Graziano Ventre and Augusto Testa have made their minor planet discoveries at the observatory using its 50-centimeter "Cavagna Telescope", a Ritchey–Chrétien astrograph. Astronomers at Sormano have developed their own custom software to make follow-up observations of near-Earth objects such as 4179 Toutatis and 99942 Apophis.

The Eunomia asteroid 6882 Sormano, discovered by Piero Sicoli and Valter Giuliani, was named in honor of the village and its discovering nearby observatory. Naming citation was published on 3 May 1996 (M.P.C. 27130).

=== Sormano 2 Observatory ===
A second observatory, Sormano 2 Observatory (obs. code: L06) is located nearby, at 373 meters elevation, just south of Bellagio. The observatory also conducts astrometric observations, such as of the near-Earth object 2018 CY2 in February 2018, using a 0.28-meter reflector (f/10 + CCD).

== Discoveries ==
The Minor Planet Center credits the discovery of 344581 Albisetti directly to the Sormano Astronomical Observatory. It is named after Italian Walter Albisetti (1957–2013).

Minor planets discovered: 1
344581 Albisetti	24 January 2003	list^{[A]}
Discovery credited to "Sormano" by the MPC

== See also ==
- List of asteroid-discovering observatories
- List of astronomical observatories
- List of minor planet discoverers § Discovering dedicated institutions
