= Pistoia Mountains Astronomical Observatory =

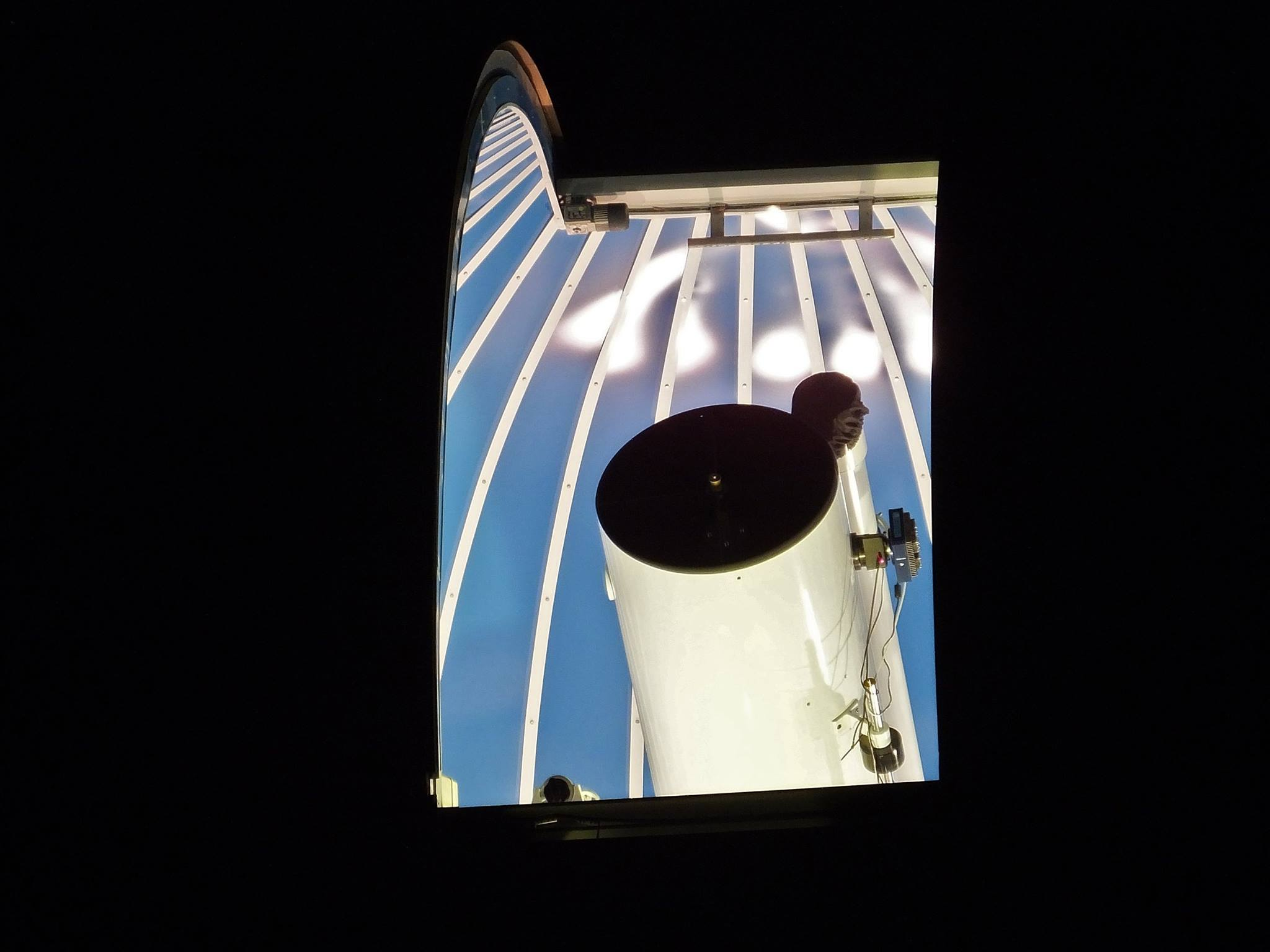
- Organization: Gruppo Astrofili Montagna Pistoiese
- Observatory code: 104
- Location: Pian dei Termini, San Marcello Piteglio, Italy
- Coordinates: 44°03′47″N 10°48′15″E
- Altitude: 1,000 m (3,300 ft) website = www.gamp-pt.net
- Website: www.gamp-pt.net

Telescopes
- Old Telescope: 40 cm Newton-Cassegrain
- New Telescope: 60 cm Newton-Cassegrain
- Related media on Commons

The Pistoia Mountains Astronomical Observatory (Italian: Osservatorio Astronomico della Montagna Pistoiese; obs. code: 104), also known as the San Marcello Observatory and the Pian dei Termini Observatory (Italian: Osservatorio di Pian dei Termini), is an astronomical observatory in San Marcello Piteglio, Tuscany, central Italy.

The observatory uses a 0.4- and 0.6-meter Newton-Cassegrain telescope and is the home of the Gruppo Astrofili Montagna Pistoiese, a group of amateur astronomers known for its members Luciano Tesi (founder), Paolo Bacci, and the late Vittorio Goretti, Silvano Casulli and Vasco Cecchini.

Minor planets discovered: 36
see § List of discovered minor planets

== List of discovered minor planets ==
(64118) 2001 TK_{17}	13 October 2001	list
(181494) 2006 UJ_{4}	16 October 2006	list
(187480) 2006 QX_{39}	24 August 2006	list
(192157) 2006 VZ_{113}	13 November 2006	list
(212632) 2006 TY_{94}	15 October 2006	list
(237279) 2008 XB_{7}	7 December 2008	list
(243035) 2006 VT_{95}	13 November 2006	list
(248866) 2006 UN_{55}	17 October 2006	list
(262238) 2006 SU_{286}	22 September 2006	list
(268789) 2006 TZ_{94}	15 October 2006	list
(292235) 2006 SP_{64}	21 September 2006	list
(292248) 2006 SF_{78}	22 September 2006	list
(300226) 2006 XK_{51}	13 December 2006	list
(306309) 2011 SH_{71}	23 September 2006	list
(314720) 2006 SQ_{64}	22 September 2006	list
(315046) 2007 CG_{51}	13 February 2007	list
(315199) 2007 QD	16 August 2007	list
(319651) 2006 TO_{7}	10 October 2006	list
(340731) 2006 SQ_{155}	22 September 2006	list
(343057) 2009 CB_{20}	15 February 2009	list

(345720) 2006 XC_{44}	12 December 2006	list
(345763) 2007 EQ_{88}	13 March 2007	list
(356630) 2011 US_{32}	23 September 2006	list
(364264) 2006 TP_{7}	11 October 2006	list
(367249) 2007 PC_{28}	12 August 2007	list
(379130) 2009 CA_{20}	15 February 2009	list
(395124) 2009 XX_{7}	10 December 2009	list
(396931) 2005 GX_{33}	4 April 2005	list
(400162) 2006 VM_{85}	14 November 2006	list
(400193) 2006 XW_{60}	14 December 2006	list
(410035) 2006 XO_{68}	14 December 2006	list
(438501) 2007 QY_{3}	16 August 2007	list
(441676) 2008 YB_{6}	21 December 2008	list
(470324) 2007 QX_{3}	16 August 2007	list
(475696) 2006 VY_{113}	13 November 2006	list
(477464) 2009 XK_{1}	8 December 2009	list

== See also ==
- List of asteroid-discovering observatories
- List of astronomical observatories
- List of minor planet discoverers § Discovering dedicated institutions
