= Padmanabhan =

Notable people with the name Padmanabhan include:

- C. M. Padmanabhan Nair (?–1977), an Indian politician
- Dayal Padmanabhan, an Indian film director and producer
- Govindarajan Padmanabhan, a renowned biochemist and a pioneer in Indian biotechnology
- Manjula Padmanabhan, a playwright, journalist, comic strip artist, and children's book author
- Mannathu Padmanabha Pillai (1878–1970), an Indian social reformer and a freedom fighter
- Mohan Padmanabhan, an Indian economist and journalist
- Neela Padmanabhan, a Tamil writer
- Nikhil Padmanabhan (born 1979) , cosmologist and astrophysicist
- Padmanabhan Balaram, an Indian biochemist
- Padmanabhan Nair (1928–2007), an eminent Kathakali exponent
- Padmanabhan Palpu (1963–1950), a bacteriologist and social revolutionary
- Padmanabhan Sivadas, an Indian cricketer
- Sundararajan Padmanabhan, the former Chief of Army Staff of the Indian Army
- Thanu Padmanabhan (1957–2021), an Indian theoretical physicist
- Thinakkal Padmanabhan, a short story writer
- Uma Padmanabhan, a Tamil socialite, actress and news presenter
- Vijay Padmanabhan, a law professor
- Dr. R. S. Padmanabhan, dental surgeon of Karnataka -1946, Qualified at Vienna

== See also ==
- Budget Padmanabhan, a South Indian Tamil film
