= Padmanabha =

Padmanabha (Sanskrit: पद्मनाभ, romanized: Padmanābha, lit. 'the one with the lotus navel') is an epithet of the Hindu deity Vishnu. It may refer to:

== Places ==
- Padmanabhaswamy Temple, in Trivandrum, Kerala, India
- Padmanabhapuram, a town in Kanyakumari district, Tamil Nadu, India
- Anantha Padmanabha Swamy Temple, in Vikarabad, Andhra Pradesh, India
- Padmanabham, one of the 46 mandals in Visakhapatnam District in India.
- Padmanabhanagar, a neighborhood in Bangalore, Karnataka, India
  - Padmanaba Nagar Assembly constituency

== Religion ==
- One of the thousand names of Vishnu in the Sanskrit hymn Vishnu Sahasranama
  - Padmanabha Swamy, the presiding deity at the Padmanabhaswamy Temple in Thiruvananthapuram, Kerala, India
- Padmanabha, in the Jain tradition, the future reincarnation of Bimbisara, King of Magadha

== Other ==
- Padmanābha (poet), 15th century Indian poet
- Padmanabhan, an Indian male given name
