= Nikhil Padmanabhan =

Indian-born cosmologist and astrophysicist

- Born: September 14, 1979 (age 46)
- Citizenship: India
- Education: Stanford University (BS, 2001); Princeton University (PhD, 2006)
- Known for: BAO reconstruction SDSS ubercalibration DESI; BOSS
- Awards: Hubble Fellowship (2006); Sloan Research Fellowship (2013); Dylan Hixon '88 Prize (2017); Lancelot M. Berkeley Prize (2026, shared)
- Scientific career
- Fields: Physical cosmology Observational cosmology High-performance computing
- Workplaces: Yale University; Lawrence Berkeley National Laboratory
- Doctoral advisor: Uroš Seljak
- Website: physics.yale.edu/people/nikhil-padmanabhan

Nikhil Padmanabhan (born September 14, 1979) is a cosmologist and tenured Associate Professor of Physics and Astronomy at Yale University. His research focuses on the large-scale structure of the universe, dark energy, and baryon acoustic oscillations (BAO), using data from large astronomical surveys including the Sloan Digital Sky Survey (SDSS), the Baryon Oscillation Spectroscopic Survey (BOSS), eBOSS, the Dark Energy Survey (DES), and the Dark Energy Spectroscopic Instrument (DESI). He co-leads the DESI BAO analysis team and has been involved leadership in cosmological surveys.

== Education and early career ==
Padmanabhan received his BS in Physics with Honours and Distinction, with a minor in Mathematics, from Stanford University in 2001, where he was elected to Phi Beta Kappa and named a President's Scholar. He received his PhD in physics from Princeton University in 2006, where he worked with Uroš Seljak as a Centennial Fellow. His doctoral research focused on the clustering of luminous red galaxies in the SDSS and their use as probes of cosmology, including the construction of one of the earliest photometric BAO measurements.

Following his PhD, Padmanabhan held a Hubble Fellowship and Chamberlain Fellowship at Lawrence Berkeley National Laboratory from 2006 to 2009. He joined the faculty at Yale University in 2009, where he holds a joint appointment in the Department of Physics and the Department of Astronomy.

== Research ==
Padmanabhan's research lies at the interface of theoretical and observational cosmology, with a focus on using the distribution of galaxies to constrain cosmological parameters and the nature of dark energy.

=== SDSS photometric calibration ===
Padmanabhan developed the "ubercal" algorithm for the photometric calibration of wide-field optical imaging surveys. The algorithm simultaneously solves for calibration parameters and relative stellar fluxes using overlapping observations, achieving approximately 1% relative calibration errors across 8,500 square degrees in the griz bands of the SDSS.

=== Baryon acoustic oscillation reconstruction ===
Padmanabhan led the first application of density-field reconstruction to observational data to sharpen the baryon acoustic oscillation signal. The reconstruction technique, building on theoretical work by Daniel Eisenstein and others, uses phase information in the galaxy density field to partially reverse non-linear gravitational evolution, thereby sharpening the BAO feature.

=== BOSS ===
Padmanabhan co-chaired the galaxy clustering working group of the Baryon Oscillation Spectroscopic Survey (BOSS), part of SDSS-III, together with Will Percival. In this role, he helped oversee the BAO measurements from the BOSS galaxy samples, which at the time provided the most precise distance measurements to the distant universe. He was also one of the named authors on the original BOSS proposal and survey design documents. He continued contributing to the successor eBOSS program and has also been involved in the Dark Energy Survey (DES).

=== DESI ===
Padmanabhan co-leads Key Project 4 (KP4) of the Dark Energy Spectroscopic Instrument (DESI) collaboration, which is responsible for BAO measurements from two-point galaxy clustering, together with Hee-Jong Seo. He led the first detection of the BAO signal from early DESI commissioning data, demonstrating a 5σ BAO detection from luminous red galaxies with only two months of observations.

=== High-performance computing ===
Padmanabhan has a secondary research interest in high-performance computing for cosmological simulations, and developed ChplUltra, a Chapel-based code for simulating ultralight dark matter dynamics on distributed computing systems.

== Awards and honors ==
- Centennial Fellow, Princeton University (2001)
- Departmental Teaching Award, Princeton University Department of Physics (2006)
- Hubble Fellowship, NASA (2006)
- Chamberlain Fellowship, Lawrence Berkeley National Laboratory (2006)
- Sloan Research Fellowship, Alfred P. Sloan Foundation (2013)
- Lancelot M. Berkeley–New York Community Trust Prize for Meritorious Work in Astronomy, American Astronomical Society (2026, shared with the DESI Collaboration)

== Selected publications ==
- Padmanabhan, Nikhil; et al. (2008). "An improved photometric calibration of the Sloan Digital Sky Survey imaging data". The Astrophysical Journal. 674 (2): 1217–1233. arXiv:astro-ph/0703454. doi:10.1086/524677.
- Padmanabhan, Nikhil; Xu, Xiaoying; Eisenstein, Daniel J.; et al. (2012). "A 2 per cent distance to z = 0.35 by reconstructing baryon acoustic oscillations – I.". Monthly Notices of the Royal Astronomical Society. 427 (3): 2132–2145. arXiv:1202.0090. doi:10.1111/j.1365-2966.2012.21888.x.
- Padmanabhan, Nikhil; et al. (2007). "The clustering of luminous red galaxies in the Sloan Digital Sky Survey imaging data". Monthly Notices of the Royal Astronomical Society. 378 (3): 852–872. arXiv:astro-ph/0605302. doi:10.1111/j.1365-2966.2007.11593.x.
