= List of minor planets: 183001–184000 =

The following is a partial list of minor planets, running from minor-planet number 183001 through 184000, inclusive. The primary data for this and other partial lists is based on JPL's "Small-Body Orbital Elements" and data available from the Minor Planet Center. Critical list information is also provided by the MPC, unless otherwise specified from Lowell Observatory. A detailed description of the table's columns and additional sources are given on the main page including a complete list of every page in this series, and a statistical break-up on the dynamical classification of minor planets.

Also see the summary list of all named bodies in numerical and alphabetical order, and the corresponding naming citations for the number range of this particular list. New namings may only be added to this list after official publication, as the preannouncement of names is condemned by the Working Group for Small Bodies Nomenclature of the International Astronomical Union.

Near-Earth obj.	MBA (inner)	MBA (outer)	Centaur
Mars-crosser	MBA (middle)	Jupiter trojan	Trans-Neptunian obj.
Unclassified

== 183001–183100 ==
Designation			Discovery			Properties		Ref
Permanent	Provisional	Named after	Date	Site	Discoverer(s)	Category	Diam.	Ref
183001	2002 PR_{49}	—	August 10, 2002	Socorro	LINEAR	NYS	1.7 km	MPC · JPL
183002	2002 PA_{55}	—	August 9, 2002	Socorro	LINEAR	·	1.8 km	MPC · JPL
183003	2002 PN_{55}	—	August 9, 2002	Socorro	LINEAR	(2076)	1.1 km	MPC · JPL
183004	2002 PO_{55}	—	August 9, 2002	Socorro	LINEAR	·	1.5 km	MPC · JPL
183005	2002 PK_{58}	—	August 10, 2002	Socorro	LINEAR	·	1.5 km	MPC · JPL
183006	2002 PG_{59}	—	August 10, 2002	Socorro	LINEAR	·	1.2 km	MPC · JPL
183007	2002 PJ_{67}	—	August 6, 2002	Palomar	NEAT	·	1.3 km	MPC · JPL
183008	2002 PG_{79}	—	August 11, 2002	Palomar	NEAT	·	1.6 km	MPC · JPL
183009	2002 PZ_{83}	—	August 10, 2002	Socorro	LINEAR	NYS	1.5 km	MPC · JPL
183010	2002 PD_{85}	—	August 10, 2002	Socorro	LINEAR	·	1.3 km	MPC · JPL
183011	2002 PA_{88}	—	August 12, 2002	Socorro	LINEAR	·	950 m	MPC · JPL
183012	2002 PM_{88}	—	August 12, 2002	Socorro	LINEAR	MIS	3.7 km	MPC · JPL
183013	2002 PT_{90}	—	August 12, 2002	Haleakala	NEAT	·	1.2 km	MPC · JPL
183014	2002 PG_{92}	—	August 14, 2002	Socorro	LINEAR	·	1.5 km	MPC · JPL
183015	2002 PT_{92}	—	August 14, 2002	Palomar	NEAT	·	3.8 km	MPC · JPL
183016	2002 PU_{93}	—	August 11, 2002	Haleakala	NEAT	·	1.6 km	MPC · JPL
183017	2002 PV_{93}	—	August 11, 2002	Haleakala	NEAT	·	4.5 km	MPC · JPL
183018	2002 PQ_{94}	—	August 12, 2002	Haleakala	NEAT	·	1.7 km	MPC · JPL
183019	2002 PG_{96}	—	August 14, 2002	Socorro	LINEAR	·	980 m	MPC · JPL
183020	2002 PF_{97}	—	August 14, 2002	Socorro	LINEAR	·	1.3 km	MPC · JPL
183021	2002 PT_{99}	—	August 14, 2002	Socorro	LINEAR	·	1.2 km	MPC · JPL
183022	2002 PQ_{110}	—	August 13, 2002	Socorro	LINEAR	V	990 m	MPC · JPL
183023	2002 PG_{113}	—	August 13, 2002	Socorro	LINEAR	·	900 m	MPC · JPL
183024	2002 PJ_{122}	—	August 14, 2002	Socorro	LINEAR	·	1.2 km	MPC · JPL
183025	2002 PR_{122}	—	August 14, 2002	Anderson Mesa	LONEOS	·	1.3 km	MPC · JPL
183026	2002 PE_{125}	—	August 14, 2002	Socorro	LINEAR	·	1.2 km	MPC · JPL
183027	2002 PP_{127}	—	August 14, 2002	Socorro	LINEAR	·	1.2 km	MPC · JPL
183028	2002 PC_{140}	—	August 13, 2002	Bergisch Gladbach	W. Bickel	·	3.1 km	MPC · JPL
183029	2002 PU_{140}	—	August 14, 2002	Siding Spring	R. H. McNaught	·	3.4 km	MPC · JPL
183030	2002 PE_{151}	—	August 6, 2002	Palomar	NEAT	·	960 m	MPC · JPL
183031	2002 PD_{165}	—	August 8, 2002	Palomar	S. F. Hönig	·	970 m	MPC · JPL
183032	2002 PD_{177}	—	August 8, 2002	Palomar	NEAT	NYS	1.4 km	MPC · JPL
183033	2002 PV_{179}	—	August 8, 2002	Palomar	NEAT	·	960 m	MPC · JPL
183034	2002 PD_{183}	—	August 11, 2002	Palomar	NEAT	·	3.4 km	MPC · JPL
183035	2002 QY	—	August 16, 2002	Palomar	NEAT	·	1.7 km	MPC · JPL
183036	2002 QR_{17}	—	August 27, 2002	Palomar	NEAT	·	1.9 km	MPC · JPL
183037	2002 QJ_{22}	—	August 27, 2002	Palomar	NEAT	·	1.2 km	MPC · JPL
183038	2002 QR_{22}	—	August 27, 2002	Palomar	NEAT	·	940 m	MPC · JPL
183039	2002 QG_{25}	—	August 28, 2002	Palomar	NEAT	·	1.2 km	MPC · JPL
183040	2002 QP_{50}	—	August 16, 2002	Palomar	Lowe, A.	·	3.2 km	MPC · JPL
183041	2002 QW_{50}	—	August 29, 2002	Palomar	R. Matson	·	1.2 km	MPC · JPL
183042	2002 QH_{52}	—	August 29, 2002	Palomar	S. F. Hönig	NYS	1.6 km	MPC · JPL
183043	2002 QY_{60}	—	August 28, 2002	Palomar	NEAT	·	680 m	MPC · JPL
183044	2002 QY_{63}	—	August 30, 2002	Palomar	NEAT	·	1.1 km	MPC · JPL
183045	2002 QZ_{63}	—	August 20, 2002	Palomar	NEAT	V	900 m	MPC · JPL
183046	2002 QB_{65}	—	August 26, 2002	Palomar	NEAT	·	940 m	MPC · JPL
183047	2002 QW_{65}	—	August 18, 2002	Palomar	NEAT	·	1.5 km	MPC · JPL
183048	2002 QM_{68}	—	August 29, 2002	Palomar	NEAT	·	1.6 km	MPC · JPL
183049	2002 QW_{69}	—	August 27, 2002	Palomar	NEAT	·	1.7 km	MPC · JPL
183050	2002 QV_{70}	—	August 18, 2002	Palomar	NEAT	·	1.6 km	MPC · JPL
183051	2002 QY_{72}	—	August 28, 2002	Palomar	NEAT	NYS	1.5 km	MPC · JPL
183052	2002 QR_{78}	—	August 29, 2002	Palomar	NEAT	·	1.0 km	MPC · JPL
183053	2002 QC_{87}	—	August 16, 2002	Nanchuan	Q. Ye	·	2.0 km	MPC · JPL
183054	2002 QW_{88}	—	August 27, 2002	Palomar	NEAT	NYS	1.2 km	MPC · JPL
183055	2002 QM_{91}	—	August 18, 2002	Palomar	NEAT	·	1.4 km	MPC · JPL
183056	2002 QK_{93}	—	August 19, 2002	Palomar	NEAT	·	1.6 km	MPC · JPL
183057	2002 QU_{93}	—	August 29, 2002	Palomar	NEAT	·	1.3 km	MPC · JPL
183058	2002 QE_{96}	—	August 18, 2002	Palomar	NEAT	·	990 m	MPC · JPL
183059	2002 QF_{97}	—	August 29, 2002	Palomar	NEAT	·	1.3 km	MPC · JPL
183060	2002 QX_{102}	—	August 17, 2002	Palomar	NEAT	NYS	1.4 km	MPC · JPL
183061	2002 QK_{107}	—	August 27, 2002	Palomar	NEAT	·	2.1 km	MPC · JPL
183062	2002 QX_{118}	—	August 18, 2002	Palomar	NEAT	·	1.5 km	MPC · JPL
183063	2002 QE_{119}	—	August 17, 2002	Haleakala	NEAT	·	1.2 km	MPC · JPL
183064	2002 QO_{119}	—	August 17, 2002	Palomar	NEAT	MAS	1.0 km	MPC · JPL
183065	2002 QT_{122}	—	August 16, 2002	Palomar	NEAT	·	2.6 km	MPC · JPL
183066	2002 RA_{6}	—	September 1, 2002	Haleakala	NEAT	V	930 m	MPC · JPL
183067	2002 RG_{13}	—	September 4, 2002	Anderson Mesa	LONEOS	·	1.6 km	MPC · JPL
183068	2002 RM_{13}	—	September 4, 2002	Anderson Mesa	LONEOS	MAS	1.1 km	MPC · JPL
183069	2002 RR_{13}	—	September 4, 2002	Anderson Mesa	LONEOS	·	1.0 km	MPC · JPL
183070	2002 RV_{18}	—	September 4, 2002	Anderson Mesa	LONEOS	·	2.7 km	MPC · JPL
183071	2002 RO_{21}	—	September 4, 2002	Anderson Mesa	LONEOS	MIS	4.0 km	MPC · JPL
183072	2002 RA_{28}	—	September 5, 2002	Socorro	LINEAR	·	1.9 km	MPC · JPL
183073	2002 RJ_{28}	—	September 5, 2002	Socorro	LINEAR	·	1.9 km	MPC · JPL
183074	2002 RD_{40}	—	September 5, 2002	Socorro	LINEAR	·	1.5 km	MPC · JPL
183075	2002 RE_{41}	—	September 5, 2002	Socorro	LINEAR	·	1.1 km	MPC · JPL
183076	2002 RB_{46}	—	September 5, 2002	Socorro	LINEAR	·	920 m	MPC · JPL
183077	2002 RJ_{46}	—	September 5, 2002	Socorro	LINEAR	·	1.7 km	MPC · JPL
183078	2002 RY_{46}	—	September 5, 2002	Socorro	LINEAR	·	1.5 km	MPC · JPL
183079	2002 RK_{49}	—	September 5, 2002	Socorro	LINEAR	NYS	1.7 km	MPC · JPL
183080	2002 RA_{52}	—	September 5, 2002	Socorro	LINEAR	V	1.2 km	MPC · JPL
183081	2002 RG_{52}	—	September 5, 2002	Socorro	LINEAR	NYS	1.9 km	MPC · JPL
183082	2002 RH_{54}	—	September 5, 2002	Socorro	LINEAR	·	1.9 km	MPC · JPL
183083	2002 RL_{54}	—	September 5, 2002	Socorro	LINEAR	·	1.9 km	MPC · JPL
183084	2002 RY_{54}	—	September 5, 2002	Anderson Mesa	LONEOS	V	1.1 km	MPC · JPL
183085	2002 RZ_{59}	—	September 5, 2002	Anderson Mesa	LONEOS	fast	1.3 km	MPC · JPL
183086	2002 RO_{72}	—	September 5, 2002	Socorro	LINEAR	·	1.6 km	MPC · JPL
183087	2002 RG_{75}	—	September 5, 2002	Socorro	LINEAR	·	1.5 km	MPC · JPL
183088	2002 RO_{79}	—	September 5, 2002	Socorro	LINEAR	·	1.3 km	MPC · JPL
183089	2002 RA_{80}	—	September 5, 2002	Socorro	LINEAR	·	1.7 km	MPC · JPL
183090	2002 RC_{81}	—	September 5, 2002	Socorro	LINEAR	CLA	2.2 km	MPC · JPL
183091	2002 RR_{82}	—	September 5, 2002	Socorro	LINEAR	NYS	1.4 km	MPC · JPL
183092	2002 RQ_{85}	—	September 5, 2002	Socorro	LINEAR	NYS	1.5 km	MPC · JPL
183093	2002 RC_{87}	—	September 5, 2002	Socorro	LINEAR	NYS	1.6 km	MPC · JPL
183094	2002 RF_{89}	—	September 5, 2002	Socorro	LINEAR	·	1.1 km	MPC · JPL
183095	2002 RK_{98}	—	September 5, 2002	Socorro	LINEAR	·	1.4 km	MPC · JPL
183096	2002 RP_{98}	—	September 5, 2002	Socorro	LINEAR	(2076)	1.9 km	MPC · JPL
183097	2002 RZ_{99}	—	September 5, 2002	Socorro	LINEAR	·	1.1 km	MPC · JPL
183098	2002 RH_{100}	—	September 5, 2002	Socorro	LINEAR	·	970 m	MPC · JPL
183099	2002 RJ_{100}	—	September 5, 2002	Socorro	LINEAR	·	1.9 km	MPC · JPL
183100	2002 RT_{101}	—	September 5, 2002	Socorro	LINEAR	·	1.3 km	MPC · JPL

== 183101–183200 ==
back to top

Designation			Discovery			Properties		Ref
Permanent	Provisional	Named after	Date	Site	Discoverer(s)	Category	Diam.	Ref
183101	2002 RO_{103}	—	September 5, 2002	Socorro	LINEAR	·	950 m	MPC · JPL
183102	2002 RM_{110}	—	September 6, 2002	Socorro	LINEAR	·	1.6 km	MPC · JPL
183103	2002 RL_{116}	—	September 7, 2002	Socorro	LINEAR	·	1.4 km	MPC · JPL
183104	2002 RL_{117}	—	September 7, 2002	Socorro	LINEAR	·	1.7 km	MPC · JPL
183105	2002 RH_{118}	—	September 4, 2002	Campo Imperatore	CINEOS	·	3.1 km	MPC · JPL
183106	2002 RB_{121}	—	September 7, 2002	Socorro	LINEAR	ERI	2.6 km	MPC · JPL
183107	2002 RJ_{127}	—	September 10, 2002	Palomar	NEAT	·	3.2 km	MPC · JPL
183108	2002 RZ_{128}	—	September 10, 2002	Haleakala	NEAT	·	1 km	MPC · JPL
183109	2002 RW_{133}	—	September 10, 2002	Palomar	NEAT	V	940 m	MPC · JPL
183110	2002 RC_{136}	—	September 11, 2002	Haleakala	NEAT	·	1.3 km	MPC · JPL
183111	2002 RC_{137}	—	September 13, 2002	Essen	Essen	·	1.5 km	MPC · JPL
183112	2002 RF_{137}	—	September 12, 2002	Goodricke-Pigott	R. A. Tucker	·	1.4 km	MPC · JPL
183113	2002 RN_{139}	—	September 10, 2002	Palomar	NEAT	T_{j} (2.97) · 3:2	11 km	MPC · JPL
183114 Vicques	2002 RU_{140}	Vicques	September 13, 2002	Vicques	M. Ory	·	2.8 km	MPC · JPL
183115	2002 RP_{147}	—	September 11, 2002	Palomar	NEAT	·	1.5 km	MPC · JPL
183116	2002 RJ_{149}	—	September 11, 2002	Haleakala	NEAT	·	900 m	MPC · JPL
183117	2002 RY_{155}	—	September 11, 2002	Palomar	NEAT	·	1.3 km	MPC · JPL
183118	2002 RE_{157}	—	September 11, 2002	Palomar	NEAT	·	1.8 km	MPC · JPL
183119	2002 RQ_{163}	—	September 12, 2002	Palomar	NEAT	·	1.3 km	MPC · JPL
183120	2002 RX_{169}	—	September 13, 2002	Palomar	NEAT	·	1.1 km	MPC · JPL
183121	2002 RV_{172}	—	September 13, 2002	Palomar	NEAT	(1338) (FLO)	940 m	MPC · JPL
183122	2002 RX_{174}	—	September 13, 2002	Palomar	NEAT	·	1.4 km	MPC · JPL
183123	2002 RN_{178}	—	September 14, 2002	Palomar	NEAT	·	860 m	MPC · JPL
183124	2002 RU_{179}	—	September 14, 2002	Kitt Peak	Spacewatch	·	1.6 km	MPC · JPL
183125	2002 RC_{182}	—	September 11, 2002	Palomar	NEAT	·	2.5 km	MPC · JPL
183126	2002 RU_{194}	—	September 12, 2002	Palomar	NEAT	·	2.7 km	MPC · JPL
183127	2002 RM_{200}	—	September 13, 2002	Palomar	NEAT	·	1.3 km	MPC · JPL
183128	2002 RC_{201}	—	September 13, 2002	Socorro	LINEAR	·	880 m	MPC · JPL
183129	2002 RO_{201}	—	September 13, 2002	Socorro	LINEAR	NYS	1.6 km	MPC · JPL
183130	2002 RR_{201}	—	September 13, 2002	Socorro	LINEAR	·	1.2 km	MPC · JPL
183131	2002 RG_{202}	—	September 13, 2002	Palomar	NEAT	·	2.7 km	MPC · JPL
183132	2002 RS_{202}	—	September 13, 2002	Palomar	NEAT	·	2.2 km	MPC · JPL
183133	2002 RK_{203}	—	September 13, 2002	Haleakala	NEAT	NYS	1.8 km	MPC · JPL
183134	2002 RK_{210}	—	September 15, 2002	Kitt Peak	Spacewatch	·	1.5 km	MPC · JPL
183135	2002 RW_{211}	—	September 15, 2002	Haleakala	NEAT	·	1.2 km	MPC · JPL
183136	2002 RC_{216}	—	September 13, 2002	Anderson Mesa	LONEOS	·	2.0 km	MPC · JPL
183137	2002 RW_{219}	—	September 15, 2002	Palomar	NEAT	·	1.7 km	MPC · JPL
183138	2002 RY_{222}	—	September 15, 2002	Haleakala	NEAT	·	3.6 km	MPC · JPL
183139	2002 RW_{224}	—	September 13, 2002	Haleakala	NEAT	·	1.2 km	MPC · JPL
183140	2002 RA_{231}	—	September 15, 2002	Haleakala	NEAT	·	1.9 km	MPC · JPL
183141	2002 RW_{231}	—	September 14, 2002	Palomar	NEAT	HOF	3.9 km	MPC · JPL
183142	2002 RF_{238}	—	September 15, 2002	Palomar	R. Matson	·	1.1 km	MPC · JPL
183143	2002 RC_{240}	—	September 14, 2002	Palomar	R. Matson	·	2.0 km	MPC · JPL
183144	2002 RZ_{241}	—	September 14, 2002	Palomar	R. Matson	·	2.4 km	MPC · JPL
183145	2002 RV_{248}	—	September 14, 2002	Palomar	NEAT	·	1.6 km	MPC · JPL
183146	2002 RH_{251}	—	September 4, 2002	Palomar	NEAT	(2076)	1.2 km	MPC · JPL
183147	2002 RB_{252}	—	September 12, 2002	Palomar	NEAT	·	1.9 km	MPC · JPL
183148	2002 RZ_{253}	—	September 14, 2002	Palomar	NEAT	V	640 m	MPC · JPL
183149	2002 RL_{254}	—	September 14, 2002	Palomar	NEAT	NYS	1.3 km	MPC · JPL
183150	2002 RQ_{260}	—	September 15, 2002	Palomar	NEAT	MAS	840 m	MPC · JPL
183151	2002 RU_{261}	—	September 6, 2002	Socorro	LINEAR	·	1.5 km	MPC · JPL
183152	2002 RR_{273}	—	September 4, 2002	Palomar	NEAT	·	1.1 km	MPC · JPL
183153	2002 SD_{1}	—	September 26, 2002	Palomar	NEAT	·	2.0 km	MPC · JPL
183154	2002 SK_{1}	—	September 26, 2002	Pla D'Arguines	R. Ferrando	·	1.3 km	MPC · JPL
183155	2002 SE_{3}	—	September 27, 2002	Palomar	NEAT	·	2.8 km	MPC · JPL
183156	2002 SR_{4}	—	September 27, 2002	Palomar	NEAT	·	1.8 km	MPC · JPL
183157	2002 SL_{7}	—	September 27, 2002	Palomar	NEAT	·	2.0 km	MPC · JPL
183158	2002 SS_{8}	—	September 27, 2002	Palomar	NEAT	·	2.2 km	MPC · JPL
183159	2002 SO_{10}	—	September 27, 2002	Palomar	NEAT	·	1.7 km	MPC · JPL
183160	2002 SO_{12}	—	September 27, 2002	Palomar	NEAT	·	1.3 km	MPC · JPL
183161	2002 SP_{14}	—	September 27, 2002	Palomar	NEAT	·	1.8 km	MPC · JPL
183162	2002 SR_{22}	—	September 26, 2002	Palomar	NEAT	·	1.4 km	MPC · JPL
183163	2002 SU_{22}	—	September 26, 2002	Haleakala	NEAT	·	1.9 km	MPC · JPL
183164	2002 SF_{23}	—	September 27, 2002	Palomar	NEAT	·	2.2 km	MPC · JPL
183165	2002 SU_{23}	—	September 27, 2002	Anderson Mesa	LONEOS	·	1.2 km	MPC · JPL
183166	2002 SF_{31}	—	September 28, 2002	Haleakala	NEAT	·	1.5 km	MPC · JPL
183167	2002 SA_{33}	—	September 28, 2002	Haleakala	NEAT	V	1.1 km	MPC · JPL
183168	2002 SO_{34}	—	September 29, 2002	Haleakala	NEAT	·	1.1 km	MPC · JPL
183169	2002 SX_{35}	—	September 29, 2002	Haleakala	NEAT	NYS	1.6 km	MPC · JPL
183170	2002 SD_{37}	—	September 29, 2002	Haleakala	NEAT	V	1.0 km	MPC · JPL
183171	2002 SN_{37}	—	September 29, 2002	Haleakala	NEAT	·	2.0 km	MPC · JPL
183172	2002 SG_{39}	—	September 30, 2002	Socorro	LINEAR	·	1.7 km	MPC · JPL
183173	2002 SM_{39}	—	September 30, 2002	Socorro	LINEAR	·	1.6 km	MPC · JPL
183174	2002 SH_{40}	—	September 30, 2002	Haleakala	NEAT	·	1.7 km	MPC · JPL
183175	2002 SM_{40}	—	September 30, 2002	Haleakala	NEAT	·	1.4 km	MPC · JPL
183176	2002 SV_{43}	—	September 29, 2002	Haleakala	NEAT	NYS	1.5 km	MPC · JPL
183177	2002 SG_{47}	—	September 30, 2002	Socorro	LINEAR	·	1.3 km	MPC · JPL
183178	2002 SO_{47}	—	September 30, 2002	Socorro	LINEAR	·	1.1 km	MPC · JPL
183179	2002 SN_{48}	—	September 30, 2002	Socorro	LINEAR	·	1.7 km	MPC · JPL
183180	2002 SQ_{49}	—	September 30, 2002	Socorro	LINEAR	·	1.7 km	MPC · JPL
183181	2002 SH_{50}	—	September 30, 2002	Haleakala	NEAT	·	1.8 km	MPC · JPL
183182 Weinheim	2002 SB_{51}	Weinheim	September 30, 2002	Weinheim	Kurtze, L.	·	2.0 km	MPC · JPL
183183	2002 SH_{51}	—	September 16, 2002	Haleakala	NEAT	·	1.5 km	MPC · JPL
183184	2002 SR_{54}	—	September 30, 2002	Socorro	LINEAR	·	1.2 km	MPC · JPL
183185	2002 SH_{55}	—	September 30, 2002	Socorro	LINEAR	·	1.2 km	MPC · JPL
183186	2002 SM_{59}	—	September 16, 2002	Palomar	NEAT	·	1.3 km	MPC · JPL
183187	2002 SA_{65}	—	September 16, 2002	Palomar	NEAT	(2076)	870 m	MPC · JPL
183188	2002 SQ_{65}	—	September 16, 2002	Palomar	NEAT	·	940 m	MPC · JPL
183189	2002 SY_{67}	—	September 26, 2002	Palomar	NEAT	(2076)	940 m	MPC · JPL
183190	2002 SC_{70}	—	September 26, 2002	Palomar	NEAT	·	1.1 km	MPC · JPL
183191	2002 ST_{71}	—	September 16, 2002	Haleakala	NEAT	EUN	1.6 km	MPC · JPL
183192	2002 TR_{4}	—	October 1, 2002	Socorro	LINEAR	NYS	2.3 km	MPC · JPL
183193	2002 TY_{4}	—	October 1, 2002	Socorro	LINEAR	·	1.8 km	MPC · JPL
183194	2002 TC_{5}	—	October 1, 2002	Socorro	LINEAR	V	1.2 km	MPC · JPL
183195	2002 TW_{5}	—	October 1, 2002	Anderson Mesa	LONEOS	·	1.3 km	MPC · JPL
183196	2002 TN_{7}	—	October 1, 2002	Anderson Mesa	LONEOS	·	1.5 km	MPC · JPL
183197	2002 TG_{10}	—	October 2, 2002	Socorro	LINEAR	V	1.2 km	MPC · JPL
183198	2002 TH_{13}	—	October 1, 2002	Anderson Mesa	LONEOS	·	1.4 km	MPC · JPL
183199	2002 TS_{13}	—	October 1, 2002	Socorro	LINEAR	NYS	2.0 km	MPC · JPL
183200	2002 TP_{15}	—	October 2, 2002	Socorro	LINEAR	·	1.7 km	MPC · JPL

== 183201–183300 ==
back to top

Designation			Discovery			Properties		Ref
Permanent	Provisional	Named after	Date	Site	Discoverer(s)	Category	Diam.	Ref
183201	2002 TE_{17}	—	October 2, 2002	Socorro	LINEAR	fast	1.1 km	MPC · JPL
183202	2002 TP_{17}	—	October 2, 2002	Socorro	LINEAR	·	2.4 km	MPC · JPL
183203	2002 TS_{17}	—	October 2, 2002	Socorro	LINEAR	·	1.3 km	MPC · JPL
183204	2002 TZ_{18}	—	October 2, 2002	Socorro	LINEAR	·	1.2 km	MPC · JPL
183205	2002 TX_{19}	—	October 2, 2002	Socorro	LINEAR	NYS	1.5 km	MPC · JPL
183206	2002 TT_{22}	—	October 2, 2002	Socorro	LINEAR	·	1.8 km	MPC · JPL
183207	2002 TE_{23}	—	October 2, 2002	Socorro	LINEAR	NYS	1.7 km	MPC · JPL
183208	2002 TR_{28}	—	October 2, 2002	Socorro	LINEAR	NYS	1.5 km	MPC · JPL
183209	2002 TW_{28}	—	October 2, 2002	Socorro	LINEAR	V	1.4 km	MPC · JPL
183210	2002 TE_{29}	—	October 2, 2002	Socorro	LINEAR	MAS	1.1 km	MPC · JPL
183211	2002 TZ_{30}	—	October 2, 2002	Socorro	LINEAR	NYS	1.8 km	MPC · JPL
183212	2002 TG_{31}	—	October 2, 2002	Socorro	LINEAR	·	1.4 km	MPC · JPL
183213	2002 TE_{33}	—	October 2, 2002	Socorro	LINEAR	·	2.1 km	MPC · JPL
183214	2002 TW_{34}	—	October 2, 2002	Socorro	LINEAR	SUL	2.9 km	MPC · JPL
183215	2002 TZ_{34}	—	October 2, 2002	Socorro	LINEAR	·	1.6 km	MPC · JPL
183216	2002 TJ_{36}	—	October 2, 2002	Socorro	LINEAR	V	1.0 km	MPC · JPL
183217	2002 TQ_{36}	—	October 2, 2002	Socorro	LINEAR	·	1.8 km	MPC · JPL
183218	2002 TK_{37}	—	October 2, 2002	Socorro	LINEAR	V	960 m	MPC · JPL
183219	2002 TN_{37}	—	October 2, 2002	Socorro	LINEAR	·	1.2 km	MPC · JPL
183220	2002 TJ_{39}	—	October 2, 2002	Socorro	LINEAR	·	1.5 km	MPC · JPL
183221	2002 TQ_{39}	—	October 2, 2002	Socorro	LINEAR	(5)	2.9 km	MPC · JPL
183222	2002 TN_{41}	—	October 2, 2002	Socorro	LINEAR	·	1.7 km	MPC · JPL
183223	2002 TS_{43}	—	October 2, 2002	Socorro	LINEAR	·	1.4 km	MPC · JPL
183224	2002 TT_{43}	—	October 2, 2002	Socorro	LINEAR	V	1.2 km	MPC · JPL
183225	2002 TX_{44}	—	October 2, 2002	Socorro	LINEAR	·	2.3 km	MPC · JPL
183226	2002 TW_{47}	—	October 2, 2002	Socorro	LINEAR	·	1.2 km	MPC · JPL
183227	2002 TY_{47}	—	October 2, 2002	Socorro	LINEAR	·	2.6 km	MPC · JPL
183228	2002 TT_{48}	—	October 2, 2002	Socorro	LINEAR	·	1.4 km	MPC · JPL
183229	2002 TD_{57}	—	October 1, 2002	Anderson Mesa	LONEOS	·	1.4 km	MPC · JPL
183230	2002 TC_{58}	—	October 4, 2002	Socorro	LINEAR	·	5.4 km	MPC · JPL
183231	2002 TJ_{70}	—	October 2, 2002	Campo Imperatore	CINEOS	·	4.2 km	MPC · JPL
183232	2002 TQ_{70}	—	October 3, 2002	Palomar	NEAT	·	4.2 km	MPC · JPL
183233	2002 TD_{72}	—	October 3, 2002	Palomar	NEAT	·	2.1 km	MPC · JPL
183234	2002 TC_{73}	—	October 3, 2002	Palomar	NEAT	·	2.1 km	MPC · JPL
183235	2002 TZ_{78}	—	October 1, 2002	Socorro	LINEAR	(5)	2.1 km	MPC · JPL
183236	2002 TQ_{81}	—	October 1, 2002	Haleakala	NEAT	·	1.1 km	MPC · JPL
183237	2002 TR_{82}	—	October 2, 2002	Socorro	LINEAR	·	1.4 km	MPC · JPL
183238	2002 TF_{85}	—	October 2, 2002	Haleakala	NEAT	·	1.5 km	MPC · JPL
183239	2002 TS_{90}	—	October 3, 2002	Palomar	NEAT	·	2.0 km	MPC · JPL
183240	2002 TG_{96}	—	October 3, 2002	Palomar	NEAT	·	3.1 km	MPC · JPL
183241	2002 TV_{98}	—	October 3, 2002	Socorro	LINEAR	·	1.8 km	MPC · JPL
183242	2002 TT_{107}	—	October 4, 2002	Socorro	LINEAR	V	1.0 km	MPC · JPL
183243	2002 TV_{108}	—	October 1, 2002	Haleakala	NEAT	·	1.5 km	MPC · JPL
183244	2002 TM_{111}	—	October 3, 2002	Kitt Peak	Spacewatch	·	1.2 km	MPC · JPL
183245	2002 TY_{111}	—	October 3, 2002	Socorro	LINEAR	NYS	1.8 km	MPC · JPL
183246	2002 TT_{121}	—	October 3, 2002	Palomar	NEAT	V	1.1 km	MPC · JPL
183247	2002 TB_{124}	—	October 4, 2002	Palomar	NEAT	PHO	1.4 km	MPC · JPL
183248	2002 TU_{125}	—	October 4, 2002	Socorro	LINEAR	V	860 m	MPC · JPL
183249	2002 TG_{131}	—	October 4, 2002	Socorro	LINEAR	·	1.7 km	MPC · JPL
183250	2002 TN_{131}	—	October 4, 2002	Socorro	LINEAR	·	2.1 km	MPC · JPL
183251	2002 TE_{134}	—	October 4, 2002	Palomar	NEAT	·	2.0 km	MPC · JPL
183252	2002 TS_{155}	—	October 5, 2002	Palomar	NEAT	·	1.4 km	MPC · JPL
183253	2002 TJ_{163}	—	October 5, 2002	Palomar	NEAT	·	2.1 km	MPC · JPL
183254	2002 TK_{166}	—	October 3, 2002	Socorro	LINEAR	·	1.4 km	MPC · JPL
183255	2002 TX_{168}	—	October 3, 2002	Palomar	NEAT	·	2.3 km	MPC · JPL
183256	2002 TL_{174}	—	October 4, 2002	Socorro	LINEAR	·	2.6 km	MPC · JPL
183257	2002 TA_{185}	—	October 4, 2002	Socorro	LINEAR	CLA	2.2 km	MPC · JPL
183258	2002 TT_{195}	—	October 3, 2002	Socorro	LINEAR	·	2.6 km	MPC · JPL
183259	2002 TT_{196}	—	October 4, 2002	Socorro	LINEAR	·	1.8 km	MPC · JPL
183260	2002 TB_{208}	—	October 4, 2002	Socorro	LINEAR	·	5.2 km	MPC · JPL
183261	2002 TE_{208}	—	October 4, 2002	Socorro	LINEAR	·	1.9 km	MPC · JPL
183262	2002 TS_{209}	—	October 6, 2002	Haleakala	NEAT	·	2.3 km	MPC · JPL
183263	2002 TG_{215}	—	October 4, 2002	Socorro	LINEAR	·	2.3 km	MPC · JPL
183264	2002 TH_{220}	—	October 5, 2002	Campo Imperatore	CINEOS	·	1.2 km	MPC · JPL
183265	2002 TR_{223}	—	October 7, 2002	Anderson Mesa	LONEOS	·	1.8 km	MPC · JPL
183266	2002 TJ_{225}	—	October 8, 2002	Anderson Mesa	LONEOS	·	1.9 km	MPC · JPL
183267	2002 TW_{225}	—	October 8, 2002	Anderson Mesa	LONEOS	·	1.8 km	MPC · JPL
183268	2002 TE_{227}	—	October 8, 2002	Anderson Mesa	LONEOS	·	1.9 km	MPC · JPL
183269	2002 TB_{241}	—	October 7, 2002	Socorro	LINEAR	MAS	1.2 km	MPC · JPL
183270	2002 TC_{241}	—	October 7, 2002	Socorro	LINEAR	·	2.1 km	MPC · JPL
183271	2002 TL_{248}	—	October 7, 2002	Palomar	NEAT	NYS	1.8 km	MPC · JPL
183272	2002 TS_{251}	—	October 8, 2002	Anderson Mesa	LONEOS	·	2.1 km	MPC · JPL
183273	2002 TP_{258}	—	October 9, 2002	Socorro	LINEAR	NYS	1.9 km	MPC · JPL
183274	2002 TS_{258}	—	October 9, 2002	Socorro	LINEAR	·	1.7 km	MPC · JPL
183275	2002 TE_{260}	—	October 9, 2002	Socorro	LINEAR	·	1.1 km	MPC · JPL
183276	2002 TT_{260}	—	October 9, 2002	Socorro	LINEAR	BAR	2.2 km	MPC · JPL
183277	2002 TV_{261}	—	October 10, 2002	Palomar	NEAT	·	1.5 km	MPC · JPL
183278	2002 TP_{270}	—	October 9, 2002	Socorro	LINEAR	·	2.1 km	MPC · JPL
183279	2002 TG_{271}	—	October 9, 2002	Socorro	LINEAR	·	1.8 km	MPC · JPL
183280	2002 TT_{274}	—	October 9, 2002	Socorro	LINEAR	·	1.8 km	MPC · JPL
183281	2002 TC_{278}	—	October 10, 2002	Socorro	LINEAR	V	1.4 km	MPC · JPL
183282	2002 TM_{283}	—	October 10, 2002	Socorro	LINEAR	·	2.9 km	MPC · JPL
183283	2002 TY_{287}	—	October 10, 2002	Socorro	LINEAR	·	1.5 km	MPC · JPL
183284	2002 TU_{294}	—	October 10, 2002	Socorro	LINEAR	PHO	1.9 km	MPC · JPL
183285	2002 TD_{298}	—	October 12, 2002	Socorro	LINEAR	WIT	1.6 km	MPC · JPL
183286 Sanjaklajić	2002 TP_{304}	Sanjaklajić	October 4, 2002	Apache Point	SDSS	·	1.3 km	MPC · JPL
183287 Deisenstein	2002 TJ_{318}	Deisenstein	October 5, 2002	Apache Point	SDSS	·	1.5 km	MPC · JPL
183288 Eyer	2002 TH_{331}	Eyer	October 5, 2002	Apache Point	SDSS	·	1.1 km	MPC · JPL
183289 Krabbendam	2002 TR_{345}	Krabbendam	October 5, 2002	Apache Point	SDSS	·	1.6 km	MPC · JPL
183290	2002 TP_{375}	—	October 3, 2002	Socorro	LINEAR	·	1.4 km	MPC · JPL
183291	2002 TC_{376}	—	October 10, 2002	Apache Point	SDSS	·	1.9 km	MPC · JPL
183292	2002 TK_{376}	—	October 6, 2002	Socorro	LINEAR	·	4.6 km	MPC · JPL
183293	2002 TD_{378}	—	October 15, 2002	Palomar	NEAT	·	4.5 km	MPC · JPL
183294 Langbroek	2002 TB_{382}	Langbroek	October 9, 2002	Palomar	NEAT	·	5.8 km	MPC · JPL
183295	2002 UJ	—	October 19, 2002	Palomar	NEAT	PHO	2.2 km	MPC · JPL
183296	2002 UX_{2}	—	October 28, 2002	Socorro	LINEAR	HNS	1.8 km	MPC · JPL
183297	2002 UZ_{5}	—	October 28, 2002	Palomar	NEAT	·	1.7 km	MPC · JPL
183298	2002 UB_{14}	—	October 29, 2002	Palomar	NEAT	EUN	2.0 km	MPC · JPL
183299	2002 UD_{19}	—	October 30, 2002	Haleakala	NEAT	(5)	1.8 km	MPC · JPL
183300	2002 UH_{19}	—	October 30, 2002	Haleakala	NEAT	slow	1.9 km	MPC · JPL

== 183301–183400 ==
back to top

Designation			Discovery			Properties		Ref
Permanent	Provisional	Named after	Date	Site	Discoverer(s)	Category	Diam.	Ref
183301	2002 UN_{20}	—	October 28, 2002	Haleakala	NEAT	·	1.5 km	MPC · JPL
183302	2002 UB_{26}	—	October 30, 2002	Palomar	NEAT	PHO	1.6 km	MPC · JPL
183303	2002 UU_{33}	—	October 31, 2002	Palomar	NEAT	·	2.2 km	MPC · JPL
183304	2002 UZ_{37}	—	October 31, 2002	Palomar	NEAT	·	1.8 km	MPC · JPL
183305	2002 UR_{41}	—	October 31, 2002	Palomar	NEAT	·	1.9 km	MPC · JPL
183306	2002 UM_{48}	—	October 31, 2002	Socorro	LINEAR	·	2.5 km	MPC · JPL
183307	2002 UZ_{55}	—	October 29, 2002	Apache Point	SDSS	·	1.2 km	MPC · JPL
183308	2002 UR_{72}	—	October 25, 2002	Palomar	NEAT	·	4.9 km	MPC · JPL
183309	2002 VQ	—	November 2, 2002	Wrightwood	J. W. Young	L5	9.8 km	MPC · JPL
183310	2002 VK_{6}	—	November 5, 2002	La Palma	La Palma	NYS	1.4 km	MPC · JPL
183311	2002 VV_{9}	—	November 1, 2002	Palomar	NEAT	·	1.5 km	MPC · JPL
183312	2002 VD_{10}	—	November 1, 2002	Palomar	NEAT	(5)	1.5 km	MPC · JPL
183313	2002 VH_{14}	—	November 5, 2002	Anderson Mesa	LONEOS	PHO	2.1 km	MPC · JPL
183314	2002 VJ_{18}	—	November 2, 2002	Haleakala	NEAT	·	1.5 km	MPC · JPL
183315	2002 VS_{21}	—	November 5, 2002	Socorro	LINEAR	·	2.2 km	MPC · JPL
183316	2002 VP_{27}	—	November 5, 2002	Anderson Mesa	LONEOS	·	1.8 km	MPC · JPL
183317	2002 VY_{27}	—	November 5, 2002	Anderson Mesa	LONEOS	V	1.2 km	MPC · JPL
183318	2002 VH_{34}	—	November 5, 2002	Socorro	LINEAR	·	2.4 km	MPC · JPL
183319	2002 VT_{41}	—	November 5, 2002	Palomar	NEAT	·	1.9 km	MPC · JPL
183320	2002 VE_{42}	—	November 5, 2002	Palomar	NEAT	·	1.6 km	MPC · JPL
183321	2002 VE_{44}	—	November 4, 2002	Haleakala	NEAT	·	1.9 km	MPC · JPL
183322	2002 VO_{49}	—	November 5, 2002	Anderson Mesa	LONEOS	·	2.0 km	MPC · JPL
183323	2002 VV_{50}	—	November 6, 2002	Anderson Mesa	LONEOS	·	1.7 km	MPC · JPL
183324	2002 VK_{51}	—	November 6, 2002	Anderson Mesa	LONEOS	(2076)	2.1 km	MPC · JPL
183325	2002 VQ_{51}	—	November 6, 2002	Anderson Mesa	LONEOS	·	1.3 km	MPC · JPL
183326	2002 VK_{52}	—	November 6, 2002	Anderson Mesa	LONEOS	V	1.1 km	MPC · JPL
183327	2002 VP_{52}	—	November 6, 2002	Anderson Mesa	LONEOS	·	1.4 km	MPC · JPL
183328	2002 VY_{55}	—	November 6, 2002	Socorro	LINEAR	NYS	1.5 km	MPC · JPL
183329	2002 VA_{56}	—	November 6, 2002	Anderson Mesa	LONEOS	NEM	3.3 km	MPC · JPL
183330	2002 VC_{67}	—	November 6, 2002	Haleakala	NEAT	·	3.9 km	MPC · JPL
183331	2002 VF_{67}	—	November 6, 2002	Haleakala	NEAT	(5)	2.0 km	MPC · JPL
183332	2002 VR_{72}	—	November 7, 2002	Socorro	LINEAR	·	2.0 km	MPC · JPL
183333	2002 VB_{77}	—	November 7, 2002	Socorro	LINEAR	V	950 m	MPC · JPL
183334	2002 VR_{77}	—	November 7, 2002	Socorro	LINEAR	·	1.6 km	MPC · JPL
183335	2002 VQ_{80}	—	November 7, 2002	Socorro	LINEAR	·	2.5 km	MPC · JPL
183336	2002 VQ_{81}	—	November 7, 2002	Socorro	LINEAR	(5)	2.3 km	MPC · JPL
183337	2002 VX_{82}	—	November 7, 2002	Socorro	LINEAR	(5)	1.7 km	MPC · JPL
183338	2002 VM_{83}	—	November 7, 2002	Socorro	LINEAR	·	2.1 km	MPC · JPL
183339	2002 VV_{86}	—	November 8, 2002	Socorro	LINEAR	·	5.6 km	MPC · JPL
183340	2002 VC_{87}	—	November 8, 2002	Socorro	LINEAR	·	1.6 km	MPC · JPL
183341	2002 VQ_{89}	—	November 11, 2002	Palomar	NEAT	·	1.9 km	MPC · JPL
183342	2002 VF_{90}	—	November 11, 2002	Socorro	LINEAR	(5)	1.7 km	MPC · JPL
183343	2002 VN_{92}	—	November 11, 2002	Socorro	LINEAR	·	1.6 km	MPC · JPL
183344	2002 VE_{93}	—	November 11, 2002	Socorro	LINEAR	·	1.5 km	MPC · JPL
183345	2002 VB_{100}	—	November 10, 2002	Socorro	LINEAR	·	2.0 km	MPC · JPL
183346	2002 VH_{104}	—	November 12, 2002	Socorro	LINEAR	NYS	1.4 km	MPC · JPL
183347	2002 VJ_{108}	—	November 12, 2002	Socorro	LINEAR	·	2.1 km	MPC · JPL
183348	2002 VE_{109}	—	November 12, 2002	Socorro	LINEAR	·	2.0 km	MPC · JPL
183349	2002 VZ_{109}	—	November 12, 2002	Socorro	LINEAR	·	2.4 km	MPC · JPL
183350	2002 VC_{110}	—	November 12, 2002	Palomar	NEAT	NYS	2.0 km	MPC · JPL
183351	2002 VP_{111}	—	November 13, 2002	Palomar	NEAT	·	2.4 km	MPC · JPL
183352	2002 VG_{114}	—	November 13, 2002	Palomar	NEAT	·	1.7 km	MPC · JPL
183353	2002 VQ_{119}	—	November 12, 2002	Socorro	LINEAR	·	2.4 km	MPC · JPL
183354	2002 VW_{119}	—	November 12, 2002	Socorro	LINEAR	·	3.8 km	MPC · JPL
183355	2002 VS_{122}	—	November 13, 2002	Palomar	NEAT	·	2.4 km	MPC · JPL
183356	2002 VH_{124}	—	November 6, 2002	Kingsnake	J. V. McClusky	NYS	1.7 km	MPC · JPL
183357 Rickshelton	2002 VT_{129}	Rickshelton	November 9, 2002	Kitt Peak	M. W. Buie	·	1.3 km	MPC · JPL
183358	2002 VM_{131}	—	November 13, 2002	Palomar	S. F. Hönig	L5	10 km	MPC · JPL
183359	2002 VS_{134}	—	November 6, 2002	Socorro	LINEAR	·	2.2 km	MPC · JPL
183360	2002 VN_{140}	—	November 13, 2002	Palomar	NEAT	·	2.4 km	MPC · JPL
183361	2002 VO_{141}	—	November 6, 2002	Palomar	NEAT	JUN	1.6 km	MPC · JPL
183362	2002 WB_{13}	—	November 28, 2002	Anderson Mesa	LONEOS	(5)	1.7 km	MPC · JPL
183363	2002 WC_{13}	—	November 28, 2002	Anderson Mesa	LONEOS	CLA	2.6 km	MPC · JPL
183364	2002 WT_{16}	—	November 28, 2002	Haleakala	NEAT	·	4.5 km	MPC · JPL
183365	2002 WK_{20}	—	November 24, 2002	Palomar	S. F. Hönig	·	1.7 km	MPC · JPL
183366	2002 WU_{22}	—	November 24, 2002	Palomar	NEAT	·	1.4 km	MPC · JPL
183367	2002 XJ	—	December 1, 2002	Socorro	LINEAR	MAS	1.2 km	MPC · JPL
183368	2002 XD_{7}	—	December 2, 2002	Socorro	LINEAR	JUN	1.8 km	MPC · JPL
183369	2002 XZ_{15}	—	December 3, 2002	Palomar	NEAT	·	2.5 km	MPC · JPL
183370	2002 XE_{17}	—	December 3, 2002	Palomar	NEAT	HNS	1.7 km	MPC · JPL
183371	2002 XP_{20}	—	December 2, 2002	Socorro	LINEAR	·	1.6 km	MPC · JPL
183372	2002 XZ_{21}	—	December 2, 2002	Socorro	LINEAR	·	2.6 km	MPC · JPL
183373	2002 XO_{22}	—	December 3, 2002	Palomar	NEAT	·	2.1 km	MPC · JPL
183374	2002 XC_{25}	—	December 5, 2002	Socorro	LINEAR	·	2.0 km	MPC · JPL
183375	2002 XT_{29}	—	December 5, 2002	Palomar	NEAT	·	2.2 km	MPC · JPL
183376	2002 XM_{30}	—	December 6, 2002	Socorro	LINEAR	·	3.9 km	MPC · JPL
183377	2002 XM_{31}	—	December 6, 2002	Socorro	LINEAR	·	2.2 km	MPC · JPL
183378	2002 XG_{37}	—	December 7, 2002	Socorro	LINEAR	JUN	1.4 km	MPC · JPL
183379	2002 XL_{44}	—	December 7, 2002	Emerald Lane	L. Ball	·	1.6 km	MPC · JPL
183380	2002 XP_{48}	—	December 10, 2002	Socorro	LINEAR	NYS	1.7 km	MPC · JPL
183381	2002 XC_{49}	—	December 10, 2002	Socorro	LINEAR	·	7.0 km	MPC · JPL
183382	2002 XJ_{51}	—	December 10, 2002	Socorro	LINEAR	·	1.6 km	MPC · JPL
183383	2002 XM_{54}	—	December 10, 2002	Palomar	NEAT	·	5.5 km	MPC · JPL
183384	2002 XD_{55}	—	December 10, 2002	Palomar	NEAT	·	2.1 km	MPC · JPL
183385	2002 XN_{58}	—	December 11, 2002	Socorro	LINEAR	(5)	2.2 km	MPC · JPL
183386	2002 XR_{59}	—	December 10, 2002	Socorro	LINEAR	·	5.2 km	MPC · JPL
183387	2002 XE_{60}	—	December 10, 2002	Socorro	LINEAR	MAS	1.3 km	MPC · JPL
183388	2002 XL_{60}	—	December 10, 2002	Socorro	LINEAR	MAS	1.2 km	MPC · JPL
183389	2002 XD_{63}	—	December 11, 2002	Socorro	LINEAR	·	3.7 km	MPC · JPL
183390	2002 XX_{66}	—	December 10, 2002	Socorro	LINEAR	·	2.1 km	MPC · JPL
183391	2002 XG_{72}	—	December 11, 2002	Socorro	LINEAR	(5)	2.2 km	MPC · JPL
183392	2002 XU_{72}	—	December 11, 2002	Socorro	LINEAR	(5)	2.4 km	MPC · JPL
183393	2002 XJ_{73}	—	December 11, 2002	Socorro	LINEAR	·	2.3 km	MPC · JPL
183394	2002 XH_{75}	—	December 11, 2002	Socorro	LINEAR	·	2.7 km	MPC · JPL
183395	2002 XT_{76}	—	December 11, 2002	Socorro	LINEAR	·	1.8 km	MPC · JPL
183396	2002 XZ_{76}	—	December 11, 2002	Socorro	LINEAR	EOS	5.0 km	MPC · JPL
183397	2002 XT_{80}	—	December 11, 2002	Socorro	LINEAR	·	1.9 km	MPC · JPL
183398	2002 XS_{91}	—	December 4, 2002	Kitt Peak	M. W. Buie	ADE	3.6 km	MPC · JPL
183399	2002 XQ_{93}	—	December 6, 2002	Kitt Peak	M. W. Buie	·	2.0 km	MPC · JPL
183400	2002 XJ_{101}	—	December 5, 2002	Socorro	LINEAR	SUL	3.5 km	MPC · JPL

== 183401–183500 ==
back to top

Designation			Discovery			Properties		Ref
Permanent	Provisional	Named after	Date	Site	Discoverer(s)	Category	Diam.	Ref
183401	2002 XM_{109}	—	December 6, 2002	Socorro	LINEAR	·	2.3 km	MPC · JPL
183402	2002 XY_{111}	—	December 6, 2002	Socorro	LINEAR	·	2.0 km	MPC · JPL
183403 Gal	2002 XW_{115}	Gal	December 11, 2002	Apache Point	SDSS	EOS	2.9 km	MPC · JPL
183404	2002 YO	—	December 27, 2002	Anderson Mesa	LONEOS	·	2.6 km	MPC · JPL
183405	2002 YE_{4}	—	December 30, 2002	Nogales	Tenagra II	AST	3.0 km	MPC · JPL
183406	2002 YK_{6}	—	December 28, 2002	Anderson Mesa	LONEOS	·	3.2 km	MPC · JPL
183407	2002 YU_{6}	—	December 28, 2002	Anderson Mesa	LONEOS	·	2.8 km	MPC · JPL
183408	2002 YM_{8}	—	December 31, 2002	Socorro	LINEAR	·	2.6 km	MPC · JPL
183409	2002 YV_{13}	—	December 31, 2002	Socorro	LINEAR	LEO	3.1 km	MPC · JPL
183410	2002 YS_{17}	—	December 31, 2002	Socorro	LINEAR	MIS	3.5 km	MPC · JPL
183411	2002 YA_{19}	—	December 31, 2002	Socorro	LINEAR	·	1.3 km	MPC · JPL
183412	2002 YF_{20}	—	December 31, 2002	Socorro	LINEAR	·	3.0 km	MPC · JPL
183413	2002 YN_{20}	—	December 31, 2002	Socorro	LINEAR	NYS	2.5 km	MPC · JPL
183414	2002 YY_{29}	—	December 31, 2002	Socorro	LINEAR	·	4.2 km	MPC · JPL
183415	2003 AH_{2}	—	January 2, 2003	Socorro	LINEAR	(1547)	2.5 km	MPC · JPL
183416	2003 AD_{5}	—	January 1, 2003	Socorro	LINEAR	·	2.0 km	MPC · JPL
183417	2003 AE_{5}	—	January 1, 2003	Socorro	LINEAR	·	2.5 km	MPC · JPL
183418	2003 AY_{6}	—	January 2, 2003	Socorro	LINEAR	EOS	2.7 km	MPC · JPL
183419	2003 AC_{12}	—	January 1, 2003	Socorro	LINEAR	·	1.8 km	MPC · JPL
183420	2003 AU_{14}	—	January 2, 2003	Anderson Mesa	LONEOS	·	3.8 km	MPC · JPL
183421	2003 AX_{17}	—	January 5, 2003	Anderson Mesa	LONEOS	EUN	2.3 km	MPC · JPL
183422	2003 AF_{20}	—	January 5, 2003	Socorro	LINEAR	·	2.2 km	MPC · JPL
183423	2003 AR_{20}	—	January 5, 2003	Socorro	LINEAR	(5)	1.7 km	MPC · JPL
183424	2003 AC_{22}	—	January 5, 2003	Socorro	LINEAR	·	2.4 km	MPC · JPL
183425	2003 AL_{23}	—	January 4, 2003	Socorro	LINEAR	·	4.8 km	MPC · JPL
183426	2003 AM_{24}	—	January 4, 2003	Socorro	LINEAR	EUN	2.1 km	MPC · JPL
183427	2003 AD_{25}	—	January 4, 2003	Socorro	LINEAR	·	2.5 km	MPC · JPL
183428	2003 AD_{29}	—	January 4, 2003	Socorro	LINEAR	·	7.5 km	MPC · JPL
183429	2003 AW_{35}	—	January 7, 2003	Socorro	LINEAR	·	2.8 km	MPC · JPL
183430	2003 AG_{55}	—	January 5, 2003	Socorro	LINEAR	EUN	1.9 km	MPC · JPL
183431	2003 AA_{58}	—	January 5, 2003	Socorro	LINEAR	EUN	2.1 km	MPC · JPL
183432	2003 AH_{61}	—	January 7, 2003	Socorro	LINEAR	·	3.0 km	MPC · JPL
183433	2003 AT_{62}	—	January 8, 2003	Socorro	LINEAR	NYS ·	3.3 km	MPC · JPL
183434	2003 AL_{63}	—	January 8, 2003	Socorro	LINEAR	·	2.1 km	MPC · JPL
183435	2003 AB_{65}	—	January 7, 2003	Socorro	LINEAR	·	4.3 km	MPC · JPL
183436	2003 AH_{65}	—	January 7, 2003	Socorro	LINEAR	EUN	2.3 km	MPC · JPL
183437	2003 AK_{65}	—	January 7, 2003	Socorro	LINEAR	·	5.3 km	MPC · JPL
183438	2003 AF_{68}	—	January 8, 2003	Socorro	LINEAR	·	2.0 km	MPC · JPL
183439	2003 AC_{72}	—	January 10, 2003	Socorro	LINEAR	·	2.5 km	MPC · JPL
183440	2003 AW_{82}	—	January 8, 2003	Bergisch Gladbach	W. Bickel	·	2.8 km	MPC · JPL
183441	2003 AK_{84}	—	January 11, 2003	Goodricke-Pigott	R. A. Tucker	·	2.8 km	MPC · JPL
183442	2003 AL_{90}	—	January 5, 2003	Socorro	LINEAR	(8737)	4.7 km	MPC · JPL
183443	2003 AZ_{91}	—	January 7, 2003	Socorro	LINEAR	·	3.1 km	MPC · JPL
183444	2003 AN_{94}	—	January 10, 2003	Socorro	LINEAR	GEF	1.9 km	MPC · JPL
183445	2003 BE_{3}	—	January 24, 2003	La Silla	A. Boattini, H. Scholl	·	3.4 km	MPC · JPL
183446	2003 BT_{7}	—	January 26, 2003	Kitt Peak	Spacewatch	·	1.4 km	MPC · JPL
183447	2003 BV_{8}	—	January 26, 2003	Anderson Mesa	LONEOS	·	2.1 km	MPC · JPL
183448	2003 BY_{10}	—	January 26, 2003	Anderson Mesa	LONEOS	·	3.3 km	MPC · JPL
183449	2003 BU_{12}	—	January 26, 2003	Haleakala	NEAT	·	3.2 km	MPC · JPL
183450	2003 BL_{18}	—	January 27, 2003	Socorro	LINEAR	HNS	2.0 km	MPC · JPL
183451	2003 BV_{18}	—	January 26, 2003	Palomar	NEAT	EUN · fast	1.8 km	MPC · JPL
183452	2003 BF_{20}	—	January 27, 2003	Anderson Mesa	LONEOS	ADE	3.4 km	MPC · JPL
183453	2003 BK_{22}	—	January 25, 2003	Palomar	NEAT	·	2.6 km	MPC · JPL
183454	2003 BK_{24}	—	January 25, 2003	Palomar	NEAT	·	2.8 km	MPC · JPL
183455	2003 BO_{30}	—	January 27, 2003	Socorro	LINEAR	·	3.0 km	MPC · JPL
183456	2003 BY_{33}	—	January 25, 2003	Palomar	NEAT	·	3.3 km	MPC · JPL
183457	2003 BC_{35}	—	January 27, 2003	Socorro	LINEAR	·	2.4 km	MPC · JPL
183458	2003 BU_{42}	—	January 29, 2003	Palomar	NEAT	·	2.9 km	MPC · JPL
183459	2003 BL_{46}	—	January 29, 2003	Socorro	LINEAR	·	2.2 km	MPC · JPL
183460	2003 BT_{52}	—	January 27, 2003	Anderson Mesa	LONEOS	(18466) · slow	3.9 km	MPC · JPL
183461	2003 BU_{54}	—	January 27, 2003	Palomar	NEAT	·	2.4 km	MPC · JPL
183462	2003 BM_{56}	—	January 28, 2003	Haleakala	NEAT	·	2.6 km	MPC · JPL
183463	2003 BH_{60}	—	January 27, 2003	Haleakala	NEAT	·	2.1 km	MPC · JPL
183464	2003 BO_{60}	—	January 27, 2003	Palomar	NEAT	·	1.9 km	MPC · JPL
183465	2003 BL_{72}	—	January 28, 2003	Palomar	NEAT	·	3.6 km	MPC · JPL
183466	2003 BE_{74}	—	January 29, 2003	Palomar	NEAT	·	5.2 km	MPC · JPL
183467	2003 BP_{75}	—	January 29, 2003	Palomar	NEAT	·	3.1 km	MPC · JPL
183468	2003 BQ_{76}	—	January 29, 2003	Palomar	NEAT	ADE	4.3 km	MPC · JPL
183469	2003 BF_{81}	—	January 31, 2003	Socorro	LINEAR	·	3.1 km	MPC · JPL
183470	2003 BH_{82}	—	January 31, 2003	Socorro	LINEAR	·	3.2 km	MPC · JPL
183471	2003 BM_{86}	—	January 25, 2003	Anderson Mesa	LONEOS	·	2.6 km	MPC · JPL
183472	2003 BV_{87}	—	January 27, 2003	Socorro	LINEAR	·	1.8 km	MPC · JPL
183473	2003 BD_{88}	—	January 27, 2003	Socorro	LINEAR	NEM	3.1 km	MPC · JPL
183474	2003 CB_{1}	—	February 1, 2003	Socorro	LINEAR	·	4.0 km	MPC · JPL
183475	2003 CK_{2}	—	February 1, 2003	Socorro	LINEAR	·	2.7 km	MPC · JPL
183476	2003 CR_{13}	—	February 4, 2003	Anderson Mesa	LONEOS	·	4.1 km	MPC · JPL
183477	2003 CD_{18}	—	February 8, 2003	Socorro	LINEAR	·	2.7 km	MPC · JPL
183478	2003 CR_{19}	—	February 7, 2003	Palomar	NEAT	·	3.1 km	MPC · JPL
183479	2003 DL_{5}	—	February 19, 2003	Palomar	NEAT	·	2.1 km	MPC · JPL
183480	2003 DP_{5}	—	February 19, 2003	Palomar	NEAT	·	2.4 km	MPC · JPL
183481	2003 DR_{5}	—	February 19, 2003	Palomar	NEAT	·	3.0 km	MPC · JPL
183482	2003 DE_{12}	—	February 25, 2003	Campo Imperatore	CINEOS	KOR	1.6 km	MPC · JPL
183483	2003 DS_{12}	—	February 26, 2003	Campo Imperatore	CINEOS	·	2.5 km	MPC · JPL
183484	2003 DZ_{14}	—	February 25, 2003	Campo Imperatore	CINEOS	·	3.9 km	MPC · JPL
183485	2003 DY_{18}	—	February 21, 2003	Palomar	NEAT	·	5.4 km	MPC · JPL
183486	2003 DX_{21}	—	February 28, 2003	Socorro	LINEAR	·	4.8 km	MPC · JPL
183487	2003 ES_{3}	—	March 6, 2003	Palomar	NEAT	AGN	1.7 km	MPC · JPL
183488	2003 ET_{6}	—	March 6, 2003	Anderson Mesa	LONEOS	·	3.0 km	MPC · JPL
183489	2003 EJ_{18}	—	March 6, 2003	Anderson Mesa	LONEOS	PAD	2.7 km	MPC · JPL
183490	2003 EQ_{18}	—	March 6, 2003	Anderson Mesa	LONEOS	AGN	2.0 km	MPC · JPL
183491	2003 EU_{21}	—	March 6, 2003	Socorro	LINEAR	·	3.7 km	MPC · JPL
183492	2003 EH_{25}	—	March 6, 2003	Anderson Mesa	LONEOS	·	4.8 km	MPC · JPL
183493	2003 EB_{29}	—	March 6, 2003	Socorro	LINEAR	·	2.5 km	MPC · JPL
183494	2003 EM_{35}	—	March 7, 2003	Socorro	LINEAR	·	3.5 km	MPC · JPL
183495	2003 EK_{37}	—	March 8, 2003	Anderson Mesa	LONEOS	·	4.2 km	MPC · JPL
183496	2003 EF_{38}	—	March 8, 2003	Anderson Mesa	LONEOS	·	3.5 km	MPC · JPL
183497	2003 EH_{46}	—	March 7, 2003	Anderson Mesa	LONEOS	·	2.9 km	MPC · JPL
183498	2003 EN_{47}	—	March 9, 2003	Socorro	LINEAR	·	4.0 km	MPC · JPL
183499	2003 ES_{61}	—	March 6, 2003	Socorro	LINEAR	NEM	3.5 km	MPC · JPL
183500	2003 FV_{2}	—	March 24, 2003	Haleakala	NEAT	EUP	5.8 km	MPC · JPL

== 183501–183600 ==
back to top

Designation			Discovery			Properties		Ref
Permanent	Provisional	Named after	Date	Site	Discoverer(s)	Category	Diam.	Ref
183501	2003 FU_{4}	—	March 25, 2003	Wrightwood	J. W. Young	·	2.5 km	MPC · JPL
183502	2003 FM_{8}	—	March 30, 2003	Socorro	LINEAR	H	880 m	MPC · JPL
183503	2003 FP_{12}	—	March 22, 2003	Kvistaberg	Uppsala-DLR Asteroid Survey	EOS	2.9 km	MPC · JPL
183504	2003 FP_{15}	—	March 23, 2003	Kitt Peak	Spacewatch	·	4.2 km	MPC · JPL
183505	2003 FY_{25}	—	March 24, 2003	Kitt Peak	Spacewatch	·	2.7 km	MPC · JPL
183506	2003 FP_{33}	—	March 23, 2003	Kitt Peak	Spacewatch	EOS	3.7 km	MPC · JPL
183507	2003 FC_{36}	—	March 23, 2003	Kitt Peak	Spacewatch	·	2.4 km	MPC · JPL
183508	2003 FE_{36}	—	March 23, 2003	Kitt Peak	Spacewatch	·	2.8 km	MPC · JPL
183509	2003 FZ_{40}	—	March 25, 2003	Palomar	NEAT	·	3.0 km	MPC · JPL
183510	2003 FJ_{41}	—	March 25, 2003	Palomar	NEAT	·	3.3 km	MPC · JPL
183511	2003 FV_{48}	—	March 24, 2003	Kitt Peak	Spacewatch	H	780 m	MPC · JPL
183512	2003 FG_{51}	—	March 25, 2003	Palomar	NEAT	·	2.6 km	MPC · JPL
183513	2003 FR_{53}	—	March 25, 2003	Palomar	NEAT	·	6.2 km	MPC · JPL
183514	2003 FC_{58}	—	March 26, 2003	Kitt Peak	Spacewatch	THB	5.9 km	MPC · JPL
183515	2003 FA_{65}	—	March 26, 2003	Palomar	NEAT	·	3.8 km	MPC · JPL
183516	2003 FJ_{78}	—	March 27, 2003	Kitt Peak	Spacewatch	·	3.7 km	MPC · JPL
183517	2003 FP_{80}	—	March 27, 2003	Socorro	LINEAR	·	3.6 km	MPC · JPL
183518	2003 FA_{81}	—	March 27, 2003	Socorro	LINEAR	·	4.2 km	MPC · JPL
183519	2003 FS_{88}	—	March 28, 2003	Kitt Peak	Spacewatch	·	3.9 km	MPC · JPL
183520	2003 FR_{90}	—	March 29, 2003	Anderson Mesa	LONEOS	·	4.8 km	MPC · JPL
183521	2003 FM_{91}	—	March 29, 2003	Anderson Mesa	LONEOS	·	3.1 km	MPC · JPL
183522	2003 FM_{93}	—	March 29, 2003	Anderson Mesa	LONEOS	·	4.1 km	MPC · JPL
183523	2003 FU_{93}	—	March 29, 2003	Anderson Mesa	LONEOS	EOS	3.8 km	MPC · JPL
183524	2003 FV_{101}	—	March 31, 2003	Socorro	LINEAR	·	3.5 km	MPC · JPL
183525	2003 FK_{110}	—	March 30, 2003	Kitt Peak	Spacewatch	CYB	8.0 km	MPC · JPL
183526	2003 FV_{114}	—	March 31, 2003	Anderson Mesa	LONEOS	·	7.1 km	MPC · JPL
183527	2003 FV_{118}	—	March 26, 2003	Anderson Mesa	LONEOS	·	5.3 km	MPC · JPL
183528	2003 FT_{126}	—	March 31, 2003	Kitt Peak	Spacewatch	·	2.6 km	MPC · JPL
183529	2003 FV_{127}	—	March 31, 2003	Catalina	CSS	·	6.1 km	MPC · JPL
183530	2003 FV_{130}	—	March 29, 2003	Anderson Mesa	LONEOS	EOS	2.8 km	MPC · JPL
183531	2003 FA_{132}	—	March 27, 2003	Kitt Peak	Spacewatch	·	3.6 km	MPC · JPL
183532	2003 GC_{27}	—	April 6, 2003	Anderson Mesa	LONEOS	·	4.0 km	MPC · JPL
183533	2003 GG_{29}	—	April 6, 2003	Haleakala	NEAT	T_{j} (2.94)	6.2 km	MPC · JPL
183534	2003 GU_{38}	—	April 7, 2003	Kitt Peak	Spacewatch	·	4.9 km	MPC · JPL
183535	2003 GN_{45}	—	April 8, 2003	Palomar	NEAT	EOS	3.7 km	MPC · JPL
183536	2003 GF_{50}	—	April 4, 2003	Kitt Peak	Spacewatch	EOS	2.8 km	MPC · JPL
183537	2003 GY_{54}	—	April 4, 2003	Kitt Peak	Spacewatch	·	4.5 km	MPC · JPL
183538	2003 GC_{55}	—	April 4, 2003	Anderson Mesa	LONEOS	·	5.0 km	MPC · JPL
183539	2003 HV_{15}	—	April 27, 2003	Socorro	LINEAR	H	1.1 km	MPC · JPL
183540	2003 HC_{17}	—	April 24, 2003	Anderson Mesa	LONEOS	EOS	3.2 km	MPC · JPL
183541	2003 HV_{22}	—	April 26, 2003	Kitt Peak	Spacewatch	·	2.8 km	MPC · JPL
183542	2003 HH_{24}	—	April 27, 2003	Kitt Peak	Spacewatch	GEF	1.5 km	MPC · JPL
183543	2003 HN_{25}	—	April 25, 2003	Kitt Peak	Spacewatch	KOR	1.6 km	MPC · JPL
183544	2003 HZ_{27}	—	April 26, 2003	Kitt Peak	Spacewatch	EOS	3.2 km	MPC · JPL
183545	2003 HJ_{35}	—	April 26, 2003	Haleakala	NEAT	·	2.7 km	MPC · JPL
183546	2003 HD_{38}	—	April 29, 2003	Socorro	LINEAR	·	4.8 km	MPC · JPL
183547	2003 HR_{38}	—	April 29, 2003	Anderson Mesa	LONEOS	·	3.4 km	MPC · JPL
183548	2003 HU_{42}	—	April 29, 2003	Kitt Peak	Spacewatch	AMO +1km	1.0 km	MPC · JPL
183549	2003 HU_{49}	—	April 29, 2003	Socorro	LINEAR	·	4.6 km	MPC · JPL
183550	2003 HU_{57}	—	April 24, 2003	Kitt Peak	Spacewatch	·	3.9 km	MPC · JPL
183551	2003 JU_{4}	—	May 3, 2003	Kitt Peak	Spacewatch	·	4.4 km	MPC · JPL
183552	2003 JY_{5}	—	May 1, 2003	Kitt Peak	Spacewatch	·	2.8 km	MPC · JPL
183553	2003 JP_{10}	—	May 2, 2003	Kitt Peak	Spacewatch	·	2.9 km	MPC · JPL
183554	2003 JP_{11}	—	May 5, 2003	Kitt Peak	Spacewatch	·	5.8 km	MPC · JPL
183555	2003 JN_{13}	—	May 6, 2003	Nogales	Tenagra II	·	6.6 km	MPC · JPL
183556	2003 JQ_{13}	—	May 5, 2003	Anderson Mesa	LONEOS	·	2.6 km	MPC · JPL
183557	2003 KZ_{2}	—	May 22, 2003	Kitt Peak	Spacewatch	·	3.7 km	MPC · JPL
183558	2003 KT_{9}	—	May 25, 2003	Anderson Mesa	LONEOS	T_{j} (2.98)	6.2 km	MPC · JPL
183559	2003 KQ_{12}	—	May 26, 2003	Kitt Peak	Spacewatch	VER	4.0 km	MPC · JPL
183560 Křišťan	2003 KO_{18}	Křišťan	May 24, 2003	Kleť	KLENOT	·	5.8 km	MPC · JPL
183561	2003 KC_{32}	—	May 27, 2003	Kitt Peak	Spacewatch	·	5.2 km	MPC · JPL
183562	2003 LP_{4}	—	June 5, 2003	Kitt Peak	Spacewatch	HYG	3.6 km	MPC · JPL
183563	2003 MD_{4}	—	June 22, 2003	Nogales	M. Schwartz, P. R. Holvorcem	·	3.7 km	MPC · JPL
183564	2003 MA_{12}	—	June 29, 2003	Socorro	LINEAR	·	6.9 km	MPC · JPL
183565	2003 NL_{2}	—	July 3, 2003	Reedy Creek	J. Broughton	·	1.8 km	MPC · JPL
183566	2003 NQ_{2}	—	July 4, 2003	Haleakala	NEAT	·	6.6 km	MPC · JPL
183567	2003 OZ_{10}	—	July 27, 2003	Reedy Creek	J. Broughton	·	1.7 km	MPC · JPL
183568	2003 OQ_{11}	—	July 20, 2003	Palomar	NEAT	H	860 m	MPC · JPL
183569	2003 PN_{3}	—	August 2, 2003	Haleakala	NEAT	·	5.1 km	MPC · JPL
183570	2003 QJ_{3}	—	August 19, 2003	Campo Imperatore	CINEOS	NYS	1.3 km	MPC · JPL
183571	2003 QK_{22}	—	August 20, 2003	Palomar	NEAT	·	1.5 km	MPC · JPL
183572	2003 QV_{31}	—	August 21, 2003	Palomar	NEAT	·	950 m	MPC · JPL
183573	2003 QH_{46}	—	August 23, 2003	Palomar	NEAT	MAS	1.1 km	MPC · JPL
183574	2003 QJ_{54}	—	August 23, 2003	Socorro	LINEAR	·	1.1 km	MPC · JPL
183575	2003 QP_{72}	—	August 23, 2003	Socorro	LINEAR	CYB	6.0 km	MPC · JPL
183576	2003 RA_{5}	—	September 3, 2003	Haleakala	NEAT	·	2.3 km	MPC · JPL
183577	2003 SX_{11}	—	September 16, 2003	Kitt Peak	Spacewatch	·	1.1 km	MPC · JPL
183578	2003 SD_{19}	—	September 16, 2003	Kitt Peak	Spacewatch	NYS	1.2 km	MPC · JPL
183579	2003 SD_{25}	—	September 17, 2003	Haleakala	NEAT	HIL · 3:2	9.8 km	MPC · JPL
183580	2003 SO_{33}	—	September 16, 2003	Anderson Mesa	LONEOS	MAS	1.2 km	MPC · JPL
183581	2003 SY_{84}	—	September 20, 2003	Haleakala	NEAT	slow	2.3 km	MPC · JPL
183582	2003 SM_{127}	—	September 19, 2003	Ondřejov	P. Kušnirák	·	1.2 km	MPC · JPL
183583	2003 SV_{177}	—	September 19, 2003	Kitt Peak	Spacewatch	·	1.8 km	MPC · JPL
183584	2003 SF_{182}	—	September 20, 2003	Socorro	LINEAR	·	2.2 km	MPC · JPL
183585	2003 SZ_{201}	—	September 18, 2003	Goodricke-Pigott	R. A. Tucker	·	2.5 km	MPC · JPL
183586	2003 SF_{204}	—	September 22, 2003	Kitt Peak	Spacewatch	NYS	1.5 km	MPC · JPL
183587	2003 SZ_{246}	—	September 26, 2003	Socorro	LINEAR	·	910 m	MPC · JPL
183588	2003 SY_{257}	—	September 28, 2003	Socorro	LINEAR	NYS	1.4 km	MPC · JPL
183589	2003 SO_{284}	—	September 20, 2003	Socorro	LINEAR	V	1.1 km	MPC · JPL
183590	2003 SH_{294}	—	September 28, 2003	Socorro	LINEAR	·	1.5 km	MPC · JPL
183591	2003 SZ_{312}	—	September 17, 2003	Palomar	NEAT	·	1.1 km	MPC · JPL
183592	2003 SJ_{313}	—	September 18, 2003	Haleakala	NEAT	·	920 m	MPC · JPL
183593	2003 TG_{16}	—	October 15, 2003	Anderson Mesa	LONEOS	·	920 m	MPC · JPL
183594	2003 TB_{53}	—	October 5, 2003	Kitt Peak	Spacewatch	·	930 m	MPC · JPL
183595	2003 TG_{58}	—	October 3, 2003	Mauna Kea	Mauna Kea	cubewano (cold)	165 km	MPC · JPL
183596	2003 UV	—	October 16, 2003	Kitt Peak	Spacewatch	·	980 m	MPC · JPL
183597	2003 UT_{14}	—	October 16, 2003	Kitt Peak	Spacewatch	·	3.3 km	MPC · JPL
183598	2003 UN_{35}	—	October 16, 2003	Anderson Mesa	LONEOS	·	1.0 km	MPC · JPL
183599	2003 UY_{39}	—	October 16, 2003	Kitt Peak	Spacewatch	·	1.9 km	MPC · JPL
183600	2003 UQ_{45}	—	October 18, 2003	Kitt Peak	Spacewatch	MAS	1.3 km	MPC · JPL

== 183601–183700 ==
back to top

Designation			Discovery			Properties		Ref
Permanent	Provisional	Named after	Date	Site	Discoverer(s)	Category	Diam.	Ref
183601	2003 UX_{57}	—	October 16, 2003	Kitt Peak	Spacewatch	·	1.5 km	MPC · JPL
183602	2003 UQ_{62}	—	October 16, 2003	Anderson Mesa	LONEOS	V	980 m	MPC · JPL
183603	2003 UO_{73}	—	October 19, 2003	Kitt Peak	Spacewatch	·	1.1 km	MPC · JPL
183604	2003 UK_{93}	—	October 17, 2003	Kitt Peak	Spacewatch	·	2.1 km	MPC · JPL
183605	2003 UW_{93}	—	October 18, 2003	Kitt Peak	Spacewatch	·	1.5 km	MPC · JPL
183606	2003 UP_{102}	—	October 20, 2003	Palomar	NEAT	·	830 m	MPC · JPL
183607	2003 UW_{103}	—	October 20, 2003	Palomar	NEAT	·	1.9 km	MPC · JPL
183608	2003 UV_{135}	—	October 21, 2003	Palomar	NEAT	·	1.0 km	MPC · JPL
183609	2003 UV_{160}	—	October 21, 2003	Kitt Peak	Spacewatch	·	1.4 km	MPC · JPL
183610	2003 UL_{161}	—	October 21, 2003	Anderson Mesa	LONEOS	·	1 km	MPC · JPL
183611	2003 UH_{175}	—	October 21, 2003	Anderson Mesa	LONEOS	·	850 m	MPC · JPL
183612	2003 UG_{179}	—	October 21, 2003	Socorro	LINEAR	·	1.5 km	MPC · JPL
183613	2003 UP_{201}	—	October 21, 2003	Socorro	LINEAR	·	1.8 km	MPC · JPL
183614	2003 UJ_{203}	—	October 21, 2003	Kitt Peak	Spacewatch	·	2.2 km	MPC · JPL
183615	2003 UE_{204}	—	October 21, 2003	Kitt Peak	Spacewatch	·	2.0 km	MPC · JPL
183616	2003 UG_{213}	—	October 23, 2003	Haleakala	NEAT	NYS	1.7 km	MPC · JPL
183617	2003 UF_{218}	—	October 21, 2003	Socorro	LINEAR	·	910 m	MPC · JPL
183618	2003 US_{221}	—	October 22, 2003	Kitt Peak	Spacewatch	·	1.6 km	MPC · JPL
183619	2003 UT_{229}	—	October 23, 2003	Anderson Mesa	LONEOS	·	780 m	MPC · JPL
183620	2003 UQ_{236}	—	October 23, 2003	Anderson Mesa	LONEOS	NYS	1.5 km	MPC · JPL
183621	2003 UJ_{242}	—	October 24, 2003	Socorro	LINEAR	·	940 m	MPC · JPL
183622	2003 UO_{245}	—	October 24, 2003	Socorro	LINEAR	·	920 m	MPC · JPL
183623	2003 UE_{260}	—	October 25, 2003	Socorro	LINEAR	·	1.3 km	MPC · JPL
183624	2003 UG_{260}	—	October 25, 2003	Socorro	LINEAR	·	4.0 km	MPC · JPL
183625	2003 UZ_{263}	—	October 27, 2003	Kitt Peak	Spacewatch	ERI	1.9 km	MPC · JPL
183626	2003 UQ_{267}	—	October 28, 2003	Socorro	LINEAR	MAS	1.1 km	MPC · JPL
183627	2003 UM_{274}	—	October 30, 2003	Socorro	LINEAR	(5)	1.5 km	MPC · JPL
183628	2003 UR_{307}	—	October 18, 2003	Anderson Mesa	LONEOS	·	920 m	MPC · JPL
183629	2003 UF_{308}	—	October 19, 2003	Kitt Peak	Spacewatch	·	1.1 km	MPC · JPL
183630	2003 US_{356}	—	October 19, 2003	Kitt Peak	Spacewatch	·	1.5 km	MPC · JPL
183631	2003 UH_{375}	—	October 22, 2003	Apache Point	SDSS	·	1.5 km	MPC · JPL
183632	2003 UB_{383}	—	October 22, 2003	Apache Point	SDSS	·	1.7 km	MPC · JPL
183633	2003 US_{402}	—	October 23, 2003	Apache Point	SDSS	NYS	1.4 km	MPC · JPL
183634	2003 US_{403}	—	October 23, 2003	Apache Point	SDSS	MAS	750 m	MPC · JPL
183635 Helmi	2003 UF_{413}	Helmi	October 24, 2003	Apache Point	SDSS	NYS	1.9 km	MPC · JPL
183636	2003 VV	—	November 5, 2003	Socorro	LINEAR	PHO	2.0 km	MPC · JPL
183637	2003 VW_{8}	—	November 15, 2003	Kitt Peak	Spacewatch	·	860 m	MPC · JPL
183638	2003 WC_{24}	—	November 19, 2003	Kitt Peak	Spacewatch	·	1.1 km	MPC · JPL
183639	2003 WO_{24}	—	November 20, 2003	Socorro	LINEAR	·	980 m	MPC · JPL
183640	2003 WR_{35}	—	November 19, 2003	Socorro	LINEAR	·	880 m	MPC · JPL
183641	2003 WU_{45}	—	November 16, 2003	Kitt Peak	Spacewatch	·	1.1 km	MPC · JPL
183642	2003 WA_{55}	—	November 20, 2003	Socorro	LINEAR	·	1.8 km	MPC · JPL
183643	2003 WF_{56}	—	November 20, 2003	Socorro	LINEAR	·	920 m	MPC · JPL
183644	2003 WX_{59}	—	November 18, 2003	Kitt Peak	Spacewatch	MAS	930 m	MPC · JPL
183645	2003 WP_{60}	—	November 18, 2003	Palomar	NEAT	·	1.5 km	MPC · JPL
183646	2003 WR_{63}	—	November 19, 2003	Kitt Peak	Spacewatch	·	960 m	MPC · JPL
183647	2003 WU_{63}	—	November 19, 2003	Kitt Peak	Spacewatch	MAS	890 m	MPC · JPL
183648	2003 WY_{66}	—	November 19, 2003	Kitt Peak	Spacewatch	NYS	1.2 km	MPC · JPL
183649	2003 WX_{67}	—	November 19, 2003	Kitt Peak	Spacewatch	·	1.9 km	MPC · JPL
183650	2003 WG_{75}	—	November 18, 2003	Kitt Peak	Spacewatch	·	980 m	MPC · JPL
183651	2003 WP_{89}	—	November 16, 2003	Catalina	CSS	·	950 m	MPC · JPL
183652	2003 WL_{91}	—	November 18, 2003	Kitt Peak	Spacewatch	V	960 m	MPC · JPL
183653	2003 WK_{93}	—	November 19, 2003	Anderson Mesa	LONEOS	·	1.0 km	MPC · JPL
183654	2003 WL_{94}	—	November 19, 2003	Anderson Mesa	LONEOS	·	900 m	MPC · JPL
183655	2003 WO_{102}	—	November 21, 2003	Socorro	LINEAR	·	2.6 km	MPC · JPL
183656	2003 WX_{108}	—	November 20, 2003	Socorro	LINEAR	·	860 m	MPC · JPL
183657	2003 WX_{115}	—	November 20, 2003	Socorro	LINEAR	·	1.1 km	MPC · JPL
183658	2003 WN_{117}	—	November 20, 2003	Socorro	LINEAR	(5)	2.0 km	MPC · JPL
183659	2003 WA_{120}	—	November 20, 2003	Socorro	LINEAR	·	1.2 km	MPC · JPL
183660	2003 WL_{120}	—	November 20, 2003	Socorro	LINEAR	·	900 m	MPC · JPL
183661	2003 WG_{123}	—	November 20, 2003	Socorro	LINEAR	·	970 m	MPC · JPL
183662	2003 WN_{126}	—	November 20, 2003	Socorro	LINEAR	·	5.4 km	MPC · JPL
183663	2003 WR_{130}	—	November 21, 2003	Socorro	LINEAR	PHO	3.6 km	MPC · JPL
183664	2003 WC_{131}	—	November 21, 2003	Kitt Peak	Spacewatch	·	990 m	MPC · JPL
183665	2003 WR_{131}	—	November 21, 2003	Palomar	NEAT	·	1.3 km	MPC · JPL
183666	2003 WL_{133}	—	November 21, 2003	Socorro	LINEAR	·	810 m	MPC · JPL
183667	2003 WQ_{133}	—	November 21, 2003	Socorro	LINEAR	·	990 m	MPC · JPL
183668	2003 WM_{134}	—	November 21, 2003	Socorro	LINEAR	(5)	1.8 km	MPC · JPL
183669	2003 WX_{135}	—	November 21, 2003	Socorro	LINEAR	·	1.5 km	MPC · JPL
183670	2003 WG_{138}	—	November 21, 2003	Socorro	LINEAR	·	1.2 km	MPC · JPL
183671	2003 WO_{145}	—	November 21, 2003	Socorro	LINEAR	·	1.2 km	MPC · JPL
183672	2003 WN_{150}	—	November 24, 2003	Anderson Mesa	LONEOS	·	1.0 km	MPC · JPL
183673	2003 WO_{192}	—	November 21, 2003	Socorro	LINEAR	·	2.1 km	MPC · JPL
183674	2003 XG_{3}	—	December 1, 2003	Socorro	LINEAR	·	1.2 km	MPC · JPL
183675	2003 XU_{14}	—	December 13, 2003	Socorro	LINEAR	PHO	1.8 km	MPC · JPL
183676	2003 XB_{17}	—	December 14, 2003	Palomar	NEAT	·	1.8 km	MPC · JPL
183677	2003 XJ_{27}	—	December 1, 2003	Socorro	LINEAR	·	1.2 km	MPC · JPL
183678	2003 XV_{31}	—	December 1, 2003	Kitt Peak	Spacewatch	MAS	740 m	MPC · JPL
183679	2003 XJ_{37}	—	December 3, 2003	Socorro	LINEAR	·	1.5 km	MPC · JPL
183680	2003 XR_{40}	—	December 14, 2003	Kitt Peak	Spacewatch	EUN	2.4 km	MPC · JPL
183681	2003 YO	—	December 16, 2003	Anderson Mesa	LONEOS	PHO	1.6 km	MPC · JPL
183682	2003 YH_{2}	—	December 18, 2003	Socorro	LINEAR	·	1.2 km	MPC · JPL
183683	2003 YW_{6}	—	December 17, 2003	Socorro	LINEAR	·	1.6 km	MPC · JPL
183684	2003 YE_{9}	—	December 16, 2003	Kitt Peak	Spacewatch	NYS	1.4 km	MPC · JPL
183685	2003 YT_{11}	—	December 17, 2003	Socorro	LINEAR	·	4.8 km	MPC · JPL
183686	2003 YX_{13}	—	December 17, 2003	Catalina	CSS	·	1.7 km	MPC · JPL
183687	2003 YX_{14}	—	December 17, 2003	Socorro	LINEAR	·	1.2 km	MPC · JPL
183688	2003 YU_{16}	—	December 17, 2003	Kitt Peak	Spacewatch	·	1.5 km	MPC · JPL
183689	2003 YV_{17}	—	December 16, 2003	Catalina	CSS	MAS	1.0 km	MPC · JPL
183690	2003 YQ_{22}	—	December 18, 2003	Socorro	LINEAR	·	1.3 km	MPC · JPL
183691	2003 YZ_{24}	—	December 18, 2003	Socorro	LINEAR	·	3.0 km	MPC · JPL
183692	2003 YP_{25}	—	December 18, 2003	Socorro	LINEAR	·	1.2 km	MPC · JPL
183693	2003 YX_{28}	—	December 17, 2003	Kitt Peak	Spacewatch	MAS	910 m	MPC · JPL
183694	2003 YQ_{29}	—	December 17, 2003	Kitt Peak	Spacewatch	MAS	980 m	MPC · JPL
183695	2003 YF_{31}	—	December 18, 2003	Socorro	LINEAR	·	2.7 km	MPC · JPL
183696	2003 YO_{31}	—	December 18, 2003	Socorro	LINEAR	·	1.2 km	MPC · JPL
183697	2003 YA_{32}	—	December 18, 2003	Kitt Peak	Spacewatch	(2076)	1.1 km	MPC · JPL
183698	2003 YM_{32}	—	December 18, 2003	Haleakala	NEAT	·	1.1 km	MPC · JPL
183699	2003 YO_{32}	—	December 18, 2003	Haleakala	NEAT	·	1.1 km	MPC · JPL
183700	2003 YK_{36}	—	December 18, 2003	Socorro	LINEAR	·	1.2 km	MPC · JPL

== 183701–183800 ==
back to top

Designation			Discovery			Properties		Ref
Permanent	Provisional	Named after	Date	Site	Discoverer(s)	Category	Diam.	Ref
183701	2003 YO_{36}	—	December 21, 2003	Socorro	LINEAR	·	1.3 km	MPC · JPL
183702	2003 YX_{36}	—	December 17, 2003	Kitt Peak	Spacewatch	NYS	1.3 km	MPC · JPL
183703	2003 YS_{39}	—	December 19, 2003	Kitt Peak	Spacewatch	·	1.2 km	MPC · JPL
183704	2003 YB_{45}	—	December 20, 2003	Socorro	LINEAR	PHO	1.8 km	MPC · JPL
183705	2003 YR_{50}	—	December 18, 2003	Socorro	LINEAR	·	850 m	MPC · JPL
183706	2003 YD_{51}	—	December 18, 2003	Socorro	LINEAR	NYS	1.8 km	MPC · JPL
183707	2003 YJ_{51}	—	December 18, 2003	Socorro	LINEAR	NYS	1.2 km	MPC · JPL
183708	2003 YF_{52}	—	December 18, 2003	Socorro	LINEAR	V	1 km	MPC · JPL
183709	2003 YN_{56}	—	December 19, 2003	Socorro	LINEAR	·	1.6 km	MPC · JPL
183710	2003 YR_{57}	—	December 19, 2003	Socorro	LINEAR	·	1.1 km	MPC · JPL
183711	2003 YG_{58}	—	December 19, 2003	Socorro	LINEAR	NYS	1.7 km	MPC · JPL
183712	2003 YY_{61}	—	December 19, 2003	Socorro	LINEAR	·	1.2 km	MPC · JPL
183713	2003 YD_{64}	—	December 19, 2003	Socorro	LINEAR	NYS	2.0 km	MPC · JPL
183714	2003 YO_{70}	—	December 19, 2003	Socorro	LINEAR	·	1.2 km	MPC · JPL
183715	2003 YG_{71}	—	December 18, 2003	Socorro	LINEAR	V	1.1 km	MPC · JPL
183716	2003 YA_{73}	—	December 18, 2003	Socorro	LINEAR	NYS	1.2 km	MPC · JPL
183717	2003 YH_{74}	—	December 18, 2003	Socorro	LINEAR	(5)	1.6 km	MPC · JPL
183718	2003 YJ_{75}	—	December 18, 2003	Socorro	LINEAR	·	1.1 km	MPC · JPL
183719	2003 YP_{75}	—	December 18, 2003	Socorro	LINEAR	NYS	1.1 km	MPC · JPL
183720	2003 YP_{82}	—	December 18, 2003	Kitt Peak	Spacewatch	·	950 m	MPC · JPL
183721	2003 YN_{84}	—	December 19, 2003	Socorro	LINEAR	·	2.9 km	MPC · JPL
183722	2003 YR_{84}	—	December 19, 2003	Kitt Peak	Spacewatch	·	1.4 km	MPC · JPL
183723	2003 YN_{85}	—	December 19, 2003	Socorro	LINEAR	V	1.0 km	MPC · JPL
183724	2003 YY_{85}	—	December 19, 2003	Socorro	LINEAR	·	1.9 km	MPC · JPL
183725	2003 YT_{89}	—	December 19, 2003	Kitt Peak	Spacewatch	·	1.4 km	MPC · JPL
183726	2003 YB_{95}	—	December 19, 2003	Socorro	LINEAR	·	920 m	MPC · JPL
183727	2003 YC_{97}	—	December 19, 2003	Socorro	LINEAR	·	1.3 km	MPC · JPL
183728	2003 YK_{99}	—	December 19, 2003	Socorro	LINEAR	NYS	2.0 km	MPC · JPL
183729	2003 YM_{99}	—	December 19, 2003	Socorro	LINEAR	·	1.2 km	MPC · JPL
183730	2003 YF_{100}	—	December 19, 2003	Socorro	LINEAR	·	1.2 km	MPC · JPL
183731	2003 YJ_{101}	—	December 19, 2003	Socorro	LINEAR	·	1.1 km	MPC · JPL
183732	2003 YC_{103}	—	December 19, 2003	Socorro	LINEAR	·	1.2 km	MPC · JPL
183733	2003 YO_{103}	—	December 21, 2003	Kitt Peak	Spacewatch	·	1.2 km	MPC · JPL
183734	2003 YT_{106}	—	December 22, 2003	Palomar	NEAT	·	1.5 km	MPC · JPL
183735	2003 YY_{109}	—	December 23, 2003	Socorro	LINEAR	·	3.2 km	MPC · JPL
183736	2003 YT_{112}	—	December 23, 2003	Socorro	LINEAR	·	1.2 km	MPC · JPL
183737	2003 YD_{113}	—	December 23, 2003	Socorro	LINEAR	·	1.2 km	MPC · JPL
183738	2003 YH_{113}	—	December 23, 2003	Socorro	LINEAR	·	1.8 km	MPC · JPL
183739	2003 YF_{117}	—	December 27, 2003	Socorro	LINEAR	·	1.5 km	MPC · JPL
183740	2003 YL_{119}	—	December 27, 2003	Socorro	LINEAR	·	1.4 km	MPC · JPL
183741	2003 YW_{119}	—	December 27, 2003	Socorro	LINEAR	NYS	1.2 km	MPC · JPL
183742	2003 YD_{120}	—	December 27, 2003	Socorro	LINEAR	·	1.1 km	MPC · JPL
183743	2003 YJ_{120}	—	December 27, 2003	Socorro	LINEAR	·	3.2 km	MPC · JPL
183744	2003 YP_{134}	—	December 28, 2003	Socorro	LINEAR	·	1.6 km	MPC · JPL
183745	2003 YT_{134}	—	December 28, 2003	Socorro	LINEAR	·	1.3 km	MPC · JPL
183746	2003 YB_{138}	—	December 27, 2003	Socorro	LINEAR	·	1.7 km	MPC · JPL
183747	2003 YK_{144}	—	December 28, 2003	Socorro	LINEAR	·	1.3 km	MPC · JPL
183748	2003 YX_{152}	—	December 29, 2003	Catalina	CSS	·	2.1 km	MPC · JPL
183749	2003 YM_{157}	—	December 16, 2003	Kitt Peak	Spacewatch	NYS	1.4 km	MPC · JPL
183750	2003 YD_{164}	—	December 17, 2003	Kitt Peak	Spacewatch	·	1.2 km	MPC · JPL
183751	2003 YR_{169}	—	December 18, 2003	Socorro	LINEAR	·	4.4 km	MPC · JPL
183752	2003 YB_{176}	—	December 29, 2003	Socorro	LINEAR	·	1.0 km	MPC · JPL
183753	2004 AO_{1}	—	January 12, 2004	Palomar	NEAT	MAS	1.2 km	MPC · JPL
183754	2004 AQ_{1}	—	January 12, 2004	Palomar	NEAT	·	2.2 km	MPC · JPL
183755	2004 AR_{3}	—	January 13, 2004	Anderson Mesa	LONEOS	·	1.7 km	MPC · JPL
183756	2004 AK_{5}	—	January 13, 2004	Anderson Mesa	LONEOS	·	1.6 km	MPC · JPL
183757	2004 AC_{6}	—	January 13, 2004	Palomar	NEAT	·	2.3 km	MPC · JPL
183758	2004 AQ_{8}	—	January 14, 2004	Palomar	NEAT	·	2.0 km	MPC · JPL
183759	2004 AY_{9}	—	January 15, 2004	Kitt Peak	Spacewatch	·	1.1 km	MPC · JPL
183760	2004 AD_{10}	—	January 15, 2004	Kitt Peak	Spacewatch	NYS	1.7 km	MPC · JPL
183761	2004 AZ_{13}	—	January 13, 2004	Kitt Peak	Spacewatch	·	1.3 km	MPC · JPL
183762	2004 AG_{18}	—	January 15, 2004	Kitt Peak	Spacewatch	·	1.1 km	MPC · JPL
183763	2004 AL_{25}	—	January 12, 2004	Palomar	NEAT	·	2.6 km	MPC · JPL
183764	2004 BQ_{1}	—	January 16, 2004	Kitt Peak	Spacewatch	·	1.5 km	MPC · JPL
183765	2004 BJ_{3}	—	January 16, 2004	Palomar	NEAT	·	1.1 km	MPC · JPL
183766	2004 BR_{3}	—	January 16, 2004	Palomar	NEAT	·	910 m	MPC · JPL
183767	2004 BD_{4}	—	January 16, 2004	Palomar	NEAT	·	1.3 km	MPC · JPL
183768	2004 BW_{4}	—	January 16, 2004	Palomar	NEAT	NYS	1.4 km	MPC · JPL
183769	2004 BF_{5}	—	January 16, 2004	Palomar	NEAT	GEF	2.1 km	MPC · JPL
183770	2004 BR_{9}	—	January 16, 2004	Palomar	NEAT	·	2.2 km	MPC · JPL
183771	2004 BJ_{12}	—	January 16, 2004	Palomar	NEAT	·	1.0 km	MPC · JPL
183772	2004 BC_{14}	—	January 17, 2004	Palomar	NEAT	MAS	990 m	MPC · JPL
183773	2004 BJ_{18}	—	January 18, 2004	Kitt Peak	Spacewatch	·	1.7 km	MPC · JPL
183774	2004 BX_{18}	—	January 18, 2004	Goodricke-Pigott	R. A. Tucker	JUN	1.5 km	MPC · JPL
183775	2004 BE_{19}	—	January 17, 2004	Palomar	NEAT	·	1.3 km	MPC · JPL
183776	2004 BH_{19}	—	January 17, 2004	Palomar	NEAT	·	1.7 km	MPC · JPL
183777	2004 BJ_{19}	—	January 17, 2004	Palomar	NEAT	·	1.2 km	MPC · JPL
183778	2004 BO_{19}	—	January 17, 2004	Palomar	NEAT	·	1.9 km	MPC · JPL
183779	2004 BO_{20}	—	January 16, 2004	Catalina	CSS	·	1.1 km	MPC · JPL
183780	2004 BA_{22}	—	January 19, 2004	Socorro	LINEAR	·	3.3 km	MPC · JPL
183781	2004 BH_{22}	—	January 17, 2004	Palomar	NEAT	·	1.5 km	MPC · JPL
183782	2004 BG_{23}	—	January 18, 2004	Palomar	NEAT	·	1.3 km	MPC · JPL
183783	2004 BE_{27}	—	January 21, 2004	Socorro	LINEAR	·	1.4 km	MPC · JPL
183784	2004 BA_{29}	—	January 18, 2004	Palomar	NEAT	·	1.8 km	MPC · JPL
183785	2004 BG_{29}	—	January 18, 2004	Palomar	NEAT	·	1.5 km	MPC · JPL
183786	2004 BJ_{30}	—	January 18, 2004	Palomar	NEAT	NYS	1.4 km	MPC · JPL
183787	2004 BP_{30}	—	January 18, 2004	Palomar	NEAT	·	1.3 km	MPC · JPL
183788	2004 BJ_{32}	—	January 19, 2004	Kitt Peak	Spacewatch	·	1.1 km	MPC · JPL
183789	2004 BT_{33}	—	January 19, 2004	Kitt Peak	Spacewatch	·	1.5 km	MPC · JPL
183790	2004 BJ_{34}	—	January 19, 2004	Catalina	CSS	·	1.4 km	MPC · JPL
183791	2004 BU_{37}	—	January 19, 2004	Catalina	CSS	NYS	1.8 km	MPC · JPL
183792	2004 BY_{37}	—	January 19, 2004	Catalina	CSS	HNS	1.7 km	MPC · JPL
183793	2004 BZ_{37}	—	January 19, 2004	Catalina	CSS	MAS	1.1 km	MPC · JPL
183794	2004 BB_{38}	—	January 19, 2004	Catalina	CSS	NYS	1.4 km	MPC · JPL
183795	2004 BG_{38}	—	January 19, 2004	Catalina	CSS	NYS	1.8 km	MPC · JPL
183796	2004 BP_{38}	—	January 20, 2004	Socorro	LINEAR	MAS	820 m	MPC · JPL
183797	2004 BY_{38}	—	January 20, 2004	Socorro	LINEAR	·	2.9 km	MPC · JPL
183798	2004 BH_{40}	—	January 21, 2004	Socorro	LINEAR	·	3.7 km	MPC · JPL
183799	2004 BJ_{40}	—	January 21, 2004	Socorro	LINEAR	·	1.1 km	MPC · JPL
183800	2004 BM_{40}	—	January 21, 2004	Socorro	LINEAR	V	1.1 km	MPC · JPL

== 183801–183900 ==
back to top

Designation			Discovery			Properties		Ref
Permanent	Provisional	Named after	Date	Site	Discoverer(s)	Category	Diam.	Ref
183801	2004 BS_{40}	—	January 21, 2004	Socorro	LINEAR	NYS	1.2 km	MPC · JPL
183802	2004 BD_{41}	—	January 21, 2004	Socorro	LINEAR	MAS	850 m	MPC · JPL
183803	2004 BX_{42}	—	January 22, 2004	Palomar	NEAT	ERI	2.3 km	MPC · JPL
183804	2004 BO_{43}	—	January 22, 2004	Socorro	LINEAR	MAS	1.1 km	MPC · JPL
183805	2004 BR_{44}	—	January 22, 2004	Socorro	LINEAR	·	1.1 km	MPC · JPL
183806	2004 BT_{48}	—	January 21, 2004	Socorro	LINEAR	·	1.9 km	MPC · JPL
183807	2004 BE_{49}	—	January 21, 2004	Socorro	LINEAR	·	1.8 km	MPC · JPL
183808	2004 BC_{52}	—	January 21, 2004	Socorro	LINEAR	·	1.1 km	MPC · JPL
183809	2004 BH_{53}	—	January 22, 2004	Socorro	LINEAR	·	1.3 km	MPC · JPL
183810	2004 BQ_{60}	—	January 21, 2004	Socorro	LINEAR	MAR	1.3 km	MPC · JPL
183811	2004 BJ_{62}	—	January 22, 2004	Socorro	LINEAR	V	1.0 km	MPC · JPL
183812	2004 BK_{63}	—	January 22, 2004	Socorro	LINEAR	·	1.5 km	MPC · JPL
183813	2004 BO_{63}	—	January 22, 2004	Socorro	LINEAR	MAS	920 m	MPC · JPL
183814	2004 BR_{64}	—	January 22, 2004	Socorro	LINEAR	·	1.7 km	MPC · JPL
183815	2004 BH_{70}	—	January 22, 2004	Socorro	LINEAR	·	1.6 km	MPC · JPL
183816	2004 BT_{70}	—	January 22, 2004	Socorro	LINEAR	NYS	1.4 km	MPC · JPL
183817	2004 BG_{71}	—	January 22, 2004	Socorro	LINEAR	·	1.7 km	MPC · JPL
183818	2004 BN_{76}	—	January 24, 2004	Socorro	LINEAR	MAR	1.5 km	MPC · JPL
183819	2004 BF_{77}	—	January 22, 2004	Socorro	LINEAR	·	1.5 km	MPC · JPL
183820	2004 BH_{77}	—	January 22, 2004	Socorro	LINEAR	NYS	1.1 km	MPC · JPL
183821	2004 BV_{77}	—	January 22, 2004	Socorro	LINEAR	·	1.3 km	MPC · JPL
183822	2004 BE_{79}	—	January 22, 2004	Socorro	LINEAR	AGN	1.6 km	MPC · JPL
183823	2004 BV_{81}	—	January 26, 2004	Anderson Mesa	LONEOS	BAP	1.9 km	MPC · JPL
183824	2004 BC_{83}	—	January 28, 2004	Kitt Peak	Spacewatch	·	1.7 km	MPC · JPL
183825	2004 BZ_{87}	—	January 23, 2004	Socorro	LINEAR	·	1.4 km	MPC · JPL
183826	2004 BF_{92}	—	January 26, 2004	Anderson Mesa	LONEOS	·	1.9 km	MPC · JPL
183827	2004 BO_{94}	—	January 28, 2004	Socorro	LINEAR	·	4.6 km	MPC · JPL
183828	2004 BV_{95}	—	January 22, 2004	Socorro	LINEAR	·	1.6 km	MPC · JPL
183829	2004 BD_{96}	—	January 24, 2004	Socorro	LINEAR	NYS	1.1 km	MPC · JPL
183830	2004 BS_{96}	—	January 24, 2004	Socorro	LINEAR	MAS	1.0 km	MPC · JPL
183831	2004 BE_{97}	—	January 24, 2004	Socorro	LINEAR	·	1.5 km	MPC · JPL
183832	2004 BZ_{98}	—	January 27, 2004	Kitt Peak	Spacewatch	·	2.0 km	MPC · JPL
183833	2004 BD_{103}	—	January 29, 2004	Socorro	LINEAR	·	1.3 km	MPC · JPL
183834	2004 BM_{104}	—	January 23, 2004	Socorro	LINEAR	·	1.5 km	MPC · JPL
183835	2004 BG_{105}	—	January 24, 2004	Socorro	LINEAR	V	1.1 km	MPC · JPL
183836	2004 BH_{105}	—	January 24, 2004	Socorro	LINEAR	MAS	1.0 km	MPC · JPL
183837	2004 BU_{108}	—	January 28, 2004	Catalina	CSS	·	1.6 km	MPC · JPL
183838	2004 BD_{109}	—	January 28, 2004	Kitt Peak	Spacewatch	·	1.7 km	MPC · JPL
183839	2004 BQ_{109}	—	January 28, 2004	Kitt Peak	Spacewatch	MAS	830 m	MPC · JPL
183840	2004 BP_{110}	—	January 28, 2004	Catalina	CSS	V	1.1 km	MPC · JPL
183841	2004 BR_{110}	—	January 28, 2004	Catalina	CSS	ERI	2.4 km	MPC · JPL
183842	2004 BS_{110}	—	January 28, 2004	Catalina	CSS	·	2.3 km	MPC · JPL
183843	2004 BW_{112}	—	January 27, 2004	Kitt Peak	Spacewatch	·	1.2 km	MPC · JPL
183844	2004 BD_{113}	—	January 27, 2004	Socorro	LINEAR	·	2.8 km	MPC · JPL
183845	2004 BQ_{114}	—	January 29, 2004	Anderson Mesa	LONEOS	·	1.6 km	MPC · JPL
183846	2004 BZ_{122}	—	January 22, 2004	Mauna Kea	Allen, L.	MAS	1.0 km	MPC · JPL
183847	2004 BF_{124}	—	January 18, 2004	Palomar	NEAT	·	1.5 km	MPC · JPL
183848	2004 BN_{130}	—	January 16, 2004	Kitt Peak	Spacewatch	·	2.3 km	MPC · JPL
183849	2004 BO_{134}	—	January 18, 2004	Catalina	CSS	·	3.4 km	MPC · JPL
183850	2004 BA_{147}	—	January 22, 2004	Socorro	LINEAR	(12739)	2.3 km	MPC · JPL
183851	2004 BA_{163}	—	January 16, 2004	Palomar	NEAT	·	1.8 km	MPC · JPL
183852	2004 BB_{163}	—	January 27, 2004	Catalina	CSS	·	3.5 km	MPC · JPL
183853	2004 CC_{2}	—	February 12, 2004	Goodricke-Pigott	Goodricke-Pigott	·	3.0 km	MPC · JPL
183854	2004 CG_{2}	—	February 12, 2004	Desert Eagle	W. K. Y. Yeung	·	2.0 km	MPC · JPL
183855	2004 CN_{3}	—	February 10, 2004	Palomar	NEAT	·	2.6 km	MPC · JPL
183856	2004 CS_{5}	—	February 10, 2004	Catalina	CSS	·	1.3 km	MPC · JPL
183857	2004 CG_{6}	—	February 10, 2004	Palomar	NEAT	V	970 m	MPC · JPL
183858	2004 CR_{7}	—	February 10, 2004	Catalina	CSS	·	1.4 km	MPC · JPL
183859	2004 CM_{10}	—	February 11, 2004	Anderson Mesa	LONEOS	NYS	1.3 km	MPC · JPL
183860	2004 CW_{12}	—	February 11, 2004	Palomar	NEAT	·	1.1 km	MPC · JPL
183861	2004 CG_{13}	—	February 11, 2004	Palomar	NEAT	MAS	1.1 km	MPC · JPL
183862	2004 CB_{14}	—	February 11, 2004	Anderson Mesa	LONEOS	NYS	1.7 km	MPC · JPL
183863	2004 CE_{14}	—	February 11, 2004	Anderson Mesa	LONEOS	·	2.0 km	MPC · JPL
183864	2004 CN_{15}	—	February 11, 2004	Kitt Peak	Spacewatch	·	1.8 km	MPC · JPL
183865	2004 CN_{16}	—	February 11, 2004	Kitt Peak	Spacewatch	MAS	1.1 km	MPC · JPL
183866	2004 CP_{17}	—	February 12, 2004	Kitt Peak	Spacewatch	NYS	1.4 km	MPC · JPL
183867	2004 CP_{21}	—	February 11, 2004	Anderson Mesa	LONEOS	NYS	1.8 km	MPC · JPL
183868	2004 CL_{35}	—	February 11, 2004	Kitt Peak	Spacewatch	·	2.5 km	MPC · JPL
183869	2004 CP_{35}	—	February 11, 2004	Catalina	CSS	·	2.4 km	MPC · JPL
183870	2004 CQ_{36}	—	February 12, 2004	Kitt Peak	Spacewatch	MAS	1.2 km	MPC · JPL
183871	2004 CO_{40}	—	February 12, 2004	Kitt Peak	Spacewatch	·	1.7 km	MPC · JPL
183872	2004 CT_{40}	—	February 12, 2004	Kitt Peak	Spacewatch	·	1.6 km	MPC · JPL
183873	2004 CN_{42}	—	February 11, 2004	Kitt Peak	Spacewatch	·	1.8 km	MPC · JPL
183874	2004 CR_{43}	—	February 12, 2004	Kitt Peak	Spacewatch	·	1.7 km	MPC · JPL
183875	2004 CK_{50}	—	February 13, 2004	Kitt Peak	Spacewatch	·	5.4 km	MPC · JPL
183876	2004 CU_{50}	—	February 15, 2004	RAS	Mayhill	·	2.1 km	MPC · JPL
183877	2004 CH_{51}	—	February 13, 2004	Palomar	NEAT	·	3.7 km	MPC · JPL
183878	2004 CS_{53}	—	February 11, 2004	Kitt Peak	Spacewatch	·	1.8 km	MPC · JPL
183879	2004 CM_{54}	—	February 11, 2004	Catalina	CSS	NYS	1.8 km	MPC · JPL
183880	2004 CC_{57}	—	February 11, 2004	Palomar	NEAT	·	4.3 km	MPC · JPL
183881	2004 CV_{57}	—	February 14, 2004	Socorro	LINEAR	·	1.4 km	MPC · JPL
183882	2004 CV_{59}	—	February 10, 2004	Palomar	NEAT	V	1.0 km	MPC · JPL
183883	2004 CK_{62}	—	February 11, 2004	Palomar	NEAT	·	1.8 km	MPC · JPL
183884	2004 CW_{66}	—	February 15, 2004	Socorro	LINEAR	·	2.4 km	MPC · JPL
183885	2004 CW_{69}	—	February 11, 2004	Palomar	NEAT	V	980 m	MPC · JPL
183886	2004 CX_{69}	—	February 11, 2004	Palomar	NEAT	·	1.4 km	MPC · JPL
183887	2004 CQ_{71}	—	February 13, 2004	Palomar	NEAT	·	3.8 km	MPC · JPL
183888	2004 CW_{71}	—	February 13, 2004	Palomar	NEAT	·	2.1 km	MPC · JPL
183889	2004 CY_{72}	—	February 13, 2004	Kitt Peak	Spacewatch	·	2.0 km	MPC · JPL
183890	2004 CT_{74}	—	February 11, 2004	Kitt Peak	Spacewatch	·	1.4 km	MPC · JPL
183891	2004 CG_{76}	—	February 11, 2004	Palomar	NEAT	·	1.6 km	MPC · JPL
183892	2004 CO_{76}	—	February 11, 2004	Kitt Peak	Spacewatch	·	1.8 km	MPC · JPL
183893	2004 CP_{76}	—	February 11, 2004	Palomar	NEAT	V	840 m	MPC · JPL
183894	2004 CV_{76}	—	February 11, 2004	Palomar	NEAT	·	2.7 km	MPC · JPL
183895	2004 CZ_{77}	—	February 11, 2004	Palomar	NEAT	NYS	1.9 km	MPC · JPL
183896	2004 CD_{79}	—	February 11, 2004	Palomar	NEAT	·	1.6 km	MPC · JPL
183897	2004 CS_{79}	—	February 11, 2004	Palomar	NEAT	·	2.3 km	MPC · JPL
183898	2004 CU_{81}	—	February 12, 2004	Kitt Peak	Spacewatch	·	1.4 km	MPC · JPL
183899	2004 CW_{81}	—	February 12, 2004	Kitt Peak	Spacewatch	MAS	900 m	MPC · JPL
183900	2004 CU_{82}	—	February 12, 2004	Kitt Peak	Spacewatch	·	1.5 km	MPC · JPL

== 183901–184000 ==
back to top

Designation			Discovery			Properties		Ref
Permanent	Provisional	Named after	Date	Site	Discoverer(s)	Category	Diam.	Ref
183901	2004 CP_{83}	—	February 12, 2004	Kitt Peak	Spacewatch	·	1.3 km	MPC · JPL
183902	2004 CW_{89}	—	February 11, 2004	Palomar	NEAT	·	2.6 km	MPC · JPL
183903	2004 CX_{89}	—	February 11, 2004	Palomar	NEAT	·	1.6 km	MPC · JPL
183904	2004 CP_{90}	—	February 12, 2004	Palomar	NEAT	V	940 m	MPC · JPL
183905	2004 CC_{91}	—	February 12, 2004	Kitt Peak	Spacewatch	·	1.5 km	MPC · JPL
183906	2004 CP_{91}	—	February 13, 2004	Desert Eagle	W. K. Y. Yeung	·	1.4 km	MPC · JPL
183907	2004 CO_{93}	—	February 11, 2004	Palomar	NEAT	V	960 m	MPC · JPL
183908	2004 CN_{94}	—	February 12, 2004	Kitt Peak	Spacewatch	·	1.4 km	MPC · JPL
183909	2004 CW_{96}	—	February 12, 2004	Palomar	NEAT	·	1.7 km	MPC · JPL
183910	2004 CY_{99}	—	February 15, 2004	Catalina	CSS	·	2.1 km	MPC · JPL
183911	2004 CB_{100}	—	February 15, 2004	Catalina	CSS	·	2.4 km	MPC · JPL
183912	2004 CS_{100}	—	February 15, 2004	Catalina	CSS	NYS	1.9 km	MPC · JPL
183913	2004 CT_{100}	—	February 15, 2004	Catalina	CSS	·	2.2 km	MPC · JPL
183914	2004 CC_{101}	—	February 15, 2004	Catalina	CSS	·	2.8 km	MPC · JPL
183915	2004 CO_{103}	—	February 12, 2004	Palomar	NEAT	·	2.2 km	MPC · JPL
183916	2004 CP_{103}	—	February 12, 2004	Palomar	NEAT	·	1.7 km	MPC · JPL
183917	2004 CF_{105}	—	February 13, 2004	Kitt Peak	Spacewatch	·	1.7 km	MPC · JPL
183918	2004 CO_{107}	—	February 14, 2004	Kitt Peak	Spacewatch	·	2.2 km	MPC · JPL
183919	2004 CX_{107}	—	February 14, 2004	Kitt Peak	Spacewatch	·	1.3 km	MPC · JPL
183920	2004 CM_{109}	—	February 11, 2004	Socorro	LINEAR	MAR	1.8 km	MPC · JPL
183921	2004 CA_{110}	—	February 14, 2004	Palomar	NEAT	·	3.5 km	MPC · JPL
183922	2004 CQ_{112}	—	February 13, 2004	Anderson Mesa	LONEOS	V	1.0 km	MPC · JPL
183923	2004 CS_{118}	—	February 11, 2004	Palomar	NEAT	·	1.1 km	MPC · JPL
183924	2004 CM_{122}	—	February 12, 2004	Kitt Peak	Spacewatch	·	1.3 km	MPC · JPL
183925	2004 CG_{123}	—	February 12, 2004	Kitt Peak	Spacewatch	·	1.6 km	MPC · JPL
183926	2004 CJ_{127}	—	February 13, 2004	Kitt Peak	Spacewatch	(2076)	1.3 km	MPC · JPL
183927	2004 DP	—	February 16, 2004	Kitt Peak	Spacewatch	NYS	1.6 km	MPC · JPL
183928	2004 DY_{1}	—	February 17, 2004	Kitt Peak	Spacewatch	·	2.4 km	MPC · JPL
183929	2004 DL_{2}	—	February 16, 2004	Kitt Peak	Spacewatch	·	1.8 km	MPC · JPL
183930	2004 DQ_{4}	—	February 16, 2004	Kitt Peak	Spacewatch	·	1.7 km	MPC · JPL
183931	2004 DR_{6}	—	February 16, 2004	Kitt Peak	Spacewatch	MAS	810 m	MPC · JPL
183932	2004 DT_{6}	—	February 16, 2004	Kitt Peak	Spacewatch	·	1.6 km	MPC · JPL
183933	2004 DF_{9}	—	February 17, 2004	Socorro	LINEAR	·	1.7 km	MPC · JPL
183934	2004 DK_{11}	—	February 16, 2004	Kitt Peak	Spacewatch	·	1.7 km	MPC · JPL
183935	2004 DW_{19}	—	February 17, 2004	Socorro	LINEAR	·	1.8 km	MPC · JPL
183936	2004 DA_{22}	—	February 17, 2004	Catalina	CSS	·	1.5 km	MPC · JPL
183937	2004 DG_{22}	—	February 17, 2004	Catalina	CSS	·	1.8 km	MPC · JPL
183938	2004 DO_{25}	—	February 16, 2004	Socorro	LINEAR	NYS	1.2 km	MPC · JPL
183939	2004 DO_{27}	—	February 16, 2004	Catalina	CSS	·	1.9 km	MPC · JPL
183940	2004 DB_{29}	—	February 17, 2004	Kitt Peak	Spacewatch	·	1.4 km	MPC · JPL
183941	2004 DX_{29}	—	February 17, 2004	Socorro	LINEAR	·	1.5 km	MPC · JPL
183942	2004 DO_{31}	—	February 17, 2004	Socorro	LINEAR	·	2.0 km	MPC · JPL
183943	2004 DN_{32}	—	February 18, 2004	Kitt Peak	Spacewatch	·	1.9 km	MPC · JPL
183944	2004 DS_{34}	—	February 19, 2004	Socorro	LINEAR	·	1.6 km	MPC · JPL
183945	2004 DW_{34}	—	February 19, 2004	Socorro	LINEAR	·	1.7 km	MPC · JPL
183946	2004 DG_{35}	—	February 19, 2004	Socorro	LINEAR	EOS	3.0 km	MPC · JPL
183947	2004 DD_{36}	—	February 19, 2004	Socorro	LINEAR	·	5.0 km	MPC · JPL
183948	2004 DB_{40}	—	February 17, 2004	Kitt Peak	Spacewatch	NYS	1.9 km	MPC · JPL
183949	2004 DH_{40}	—	February 18, 2004	Socorro	LINEAR	·	2.0 km	MPC · JPL
183950	2004 DO_{40}	—	February 22, 2004	Kitt Peak	Spacewatch	NYS	1.7 km	MPC · JPL
183951	2004 DF_{43}	—	February 23, 2004	Socorro	LINEAR	MAS	1.1 km	MPC · JPL
183952	2004 DL_{44}	—	February 25, 2004	Nogales	Tenagra II	NYS	1.9 km	MPC · JPL
183953	2004 DA_{47}	—	February 19, 2004	Socorro	LINEAR	·	1.8 km	MPC · JPL
183954	2004 DS_{47}	—	February 19, 2004	Socorro	LINEAR	V	860 m	MPC · JPL
183955	2004 DG_{50}	—	February 22, 2004	Kitt Peak	Spacewatch	·	1.4 km	MPC · JPL
183956	2004 DC_{52}	—	February 24, 2004	Haleakala	NEAT	·	1.7 km	MPC · JPL
183957	2004 DK_{54}	—	February 22, 2004	Kitt Peak	Spacewatch	NYS	1.5 km	MPC · JPL
183958	2004 DG_{56}	—	February 22, 2004	Kitt Peak	Spacewatch	·	1.3 km	MPC · JPL
183959	2004 DT_{59}	—	February 25, 2004	Socorro	LINEAR	·	1.9 km	MPC · JPL
183960	2004 DL_{60}	—	February 26, 2004	Socorro	LINEAR	·	1.9 km	MPC · JPL
183961	2004 DM_{61}	—	February 26, 2004	Socorro	LINEAR	·	1.6 km	MPC · JPL
183962	2004 DM_{62}	—	February 17, 2004	Socorro	LINEAR	·	2.5 km	MPC · JPL
183963	2004 DJ_{64}	—	February 26, 2004	Kitt Peak	M. W. Buie	cubewano (cold)	130 km	MPC · JPL
183964	2004 DJ_{71}	—	February 26, 2004	Kitt Peak	M. W. Buie	res · 3:7	112 km	MPC · JPL
183965	2004 DD_{77}	—	February 18, 2004	Socorro	LINEAR	MAS	1.2 km	MPC · JPL
183966	2004 ER_{1}	—	March 11, 2004	Palomar	NEAT	V	1.2 km	MPC · JPL
183967	2004 EQ_{4}	—	March 11, 2004	Palomar	NEAT	THM	3.5 km	MPC · JPL
183968	2004 EW_{6}	—	March 12, 2004	Palomar	NEAT	V	1.0 km	MPC · JPL
183969	2004 ES_{7}	—	March 12, 2004	Palomar	NEAT	·	3.6 km	MPC · JPL
183970	2004 EC_{8}	—	March 13, 2004	Palomar	NEAT	·	2.3 km	MPC · JPL
183971	2004 EG_{8}	—	March 13, 2004	Palomar	NEAT	HNS	1.5 km	MPC · JPL
183972	2004 EA_{11}	—	March 15, 2004	Desert Eagle	W. K. Y. Yeung	·	1.8 km	MPC · JPL
183973	2004 EH_{11}	—	March 10, 2004	Palomar	NEAT	·	1.7 km	MPC · JPL
183974	2004 EM_{15}	—	March 11, 2004	Palomar	NEAT	·	2.2 km	MPC · JPL
183975	2004 EX_{15}	—	March 12, 2004	Palomar	NEAT	EUN	2.3 km	MPC · JPL
183976	2004 ER_{19}	—	March 14, 2004	Kitt Peak	Spacewatch	·	1.8 km	MPC · JPL
183977	2004 EP_{28}	—	March 15, 2004	Kitt Peak	Spacewatch	·	1.9 km	MPC · JPL
183978	2004 EU_{28}	—	March 15, 2004	Kitt Peak	Spacewatch	·	1.4 km	MPC · JPL
183979	2004 EJ_{31}	—	March 14, 2004	Palomar	NEAT	·	4.0 km	MPC · JPL
183980	2004 ED_{36}	—	March 13, 2004	Palomar	NEAT	SUL	3.0 km	MPC · JPL
183981	2004 EJ_{37}	—	March 13, 2004	Palomar	NEAT	·	4.4 km	MPC · JPL
183982	2004 EH_{43}	—	March 15, 2004	Kitt Peak	Spacewatch	·	2.1 km	MPC · JPL
183983	2004 EH_{44}	—	March 14, 2004	Kitt Peak	Spacewatch	·	1.7 km	MPC · JPL
183984	2004 EQ_{45}	—	March 15, 2004	Kitt Peak	Spacewatch	NEM	3.0 km	MPC · JPL
183985	2004 EK_{46}	—	March 15, 2004	Socorro	LINEAR	·	2.2 km	MPC · JPL
183986	2004 EH_{48}	—	March 15, 2004	Socorro	LINEAR	NYS	1.4 km	MPC · JPL
183987	2004 EU_{51}	—	March 15, 2004	Socorro	LINEAR	·	1.5 km	MPC · JPL
183988	2004 EL_{52}	—	March 15, 2004	Socorro	LINEAR	·	1.6 km	MPC · JPL
183989	2004 EF_{53}	—	March 15, 2004	Socorro	LINEAR	·	2.5 km	MPC · JPL
183990	2004 EM_{53}	—	March 15, 2004	Socorro	LINEAR	·	1.6 km	MPC · JPL
183991	2004 EJ_{54}	—	March 12, 2004	Palomar	NEAT	·	1.7 km	MPC · JPL
183992	2004 EX_{58}	—	March 15, 2004	Palomar	NEAT	·	2.0 km	MPC · JPL
183993	2004 EV_{60}	—	March 12, 2004	Palomar	NEAT	·	1.3 km	MPC · JPL
183994	2004 EF_{63}	—	March 13, 2004	Palomar	NEAT	V	1.0 km	MPC · JPL
183995	2004 EU_{63}	—	March 13, 2004	Palomar	NEAT	·	1.6 km	MPC · JPL
183996	2004 EU_{71}	—	March 15, 2004	Kitt Peak	Spacewatch	NYS	1.3 km	MPC · JPL
183997	2004 EE_{72}	—	March 15, 2004	Socorro	LINEAR	·	1.8 km	MPC · JPL
183998	2004 EQ_{74}	—	March 13, 2004	Palomar	NEAT	HNS	1.8 km	MPC · JPL
183999	2004 EV_{76}	—	March 15, 2004	Catalina	CSS	·	2.4 km	MPC · JPL
184000	2004 EB_{78}	—	March 15, 2004	Catalina	CSS	·	1.6 km	MPC · JPL

back to top

== See also ==
- Meanings of minor-planet names: 183001–184000
