= Meanings of minor-planet names: 183001–184000 =

As minor planet discoveries are confirmed, they are given a permanent number by the IAU's Minor Planet Center (MPC), and the discoverers can then submit names for them, following the IAU's naming conventions. The list below concerns those minor planets in the specified number-range that have received names, and explains the meanings of those names.

Official naming citations of newly named small Solar System bodies are approved and published in a bulletin by IAU's Working Group for Small Bodies Nomenclature (WGSBN). Before May 2021, citations were published in MPC's Minor Planet Circulars for many decades. Recent citations can also be found on the JPL Small-Body Database (SBDB). Until his death in 2016, German astronomer Lutz D. Schmadel compiled these citations into the Dictionary of Minor Planet Names (DMP) and regularly updated the collection.

Based on Paul Herget's The Names of the Minor Planets, Schmadel also researched the unclear origin of numerous asteroids, most of which had been named prior to World War II. This article incorporates text from this source, which is in the public domain: SBDB New namings may only be added to this list below after official publication as the preannouncement of names is condemned. The WGSBN publishes a comprehensive guideline for the naming rules of non-cometary small Solar System bodies.

== 183001–183100 ==
| Named minor planet | Provisional | This minor planet was named for... | Ref · Catalog |
|---|---|---|---|
There are no named minor planets in this number range

== 183101–183200 ==
back to top

| Named minor planet | Provisional | This minor planet was named for... | Ref · Catalog |
|---|---|---|---|
| 183114 Vicques | 2002 RU_{140} | The Swiss municipality of Vicques, in the Jura Mountains, where this asteroid was discovered at the Jura Observatory | JPL · 183114 |
| 183182 Weinheim | 2002 SB_{51} | The German town of Weinheim, located on the western side of the Odenwald mountain range near Heidelberg Germany | JPL · 183182 |

== 183201–183300 ==
back to top

| Named minor planet | Provisional | This minor planet was named for... | Ref · Catalog |
|---|---|---|---|
| 183286 Sanjaklajić | 2002 TP_{304} | Sanja Klajić, Croatian physician. | IAU · 183286 |
| 183287 Deisenstein | 2002 TJ_{318} | Daniel Eisenstein (born 1970), an American astronomer with the Sloan Digital Sky Survey | JPL · 183287 |
| 183288 Eyer | 2002 TH_{331} | Laurent Eyer (born 1965), a Swiss astronomer with the Sloan Digital Sky Survey | JPL · 183288 |
| 183289 Krabbendam | 2002 TR_{345} | Victor Krabbendam, American engineer and project manager who played a central role in the design, construction, and commissioning of the Vera C. Rubin Observatory. | IAU · 183289 |
| 183294 Langbroek | 2002 TB_{382} | Marco Langbroek (born 1970), Dutch archeologist and amateur astronomer, who also observes meteors as a member of the Dutch Meteor Society | JPL · 183294 |

== 183301–183400 ==
back to top

| Named minor planet | Provisional | This minor planet was named for... | Ref · Catalog |
|---|---|---|---|
| 183357 Rickshelton | 2002 VT_{129} | Richard G. Shelton (born 1957), Johns Hopkins University Applied Physics Laboratory, served as a Senior Mission Operations Analyst for the New Horizons mission to Pluto. | JPL · 183357 |

== 183401–183500 ==
back to top

| Named minor planet | Provisional | This minor planet was named for... | Ref · Catalog |
|---|---|---|---|
| 183403 Gal | 2002 XW_{115} | Roy Gal (born 1973), an American astronomer with the Sloan Digital Sky Survey | JPL · 183403 |

== 183501–183600 ==
back to top

| Named minor planet | Provisional | This minor planet was named for... | Ref · Catalog |
|---|---|---|---|
| 183560 Křišťan | 2003 KO_{18} | Christian of Prachatice (1360–1368), medieval Czech astronomer | JPL · 183560 |

== 183601–183700 ==
back to top

| Named minor planet | Provisional | This minor planet was named for... | Ref · Catalog |
|---|---|---|---|
| 183635 Helmi | 2003 UF_{413} | Amina Helmi (born 1970), an Argentinian-Dutch astronomer with the Sloan Digital Sky Survey | JPL · 183635 |

== 183701–183800 ==
back to top

| Named minor planet | Provisional | This minor planet was named for... | Ref · Catalog |
|---|---|---|---|
There are no named minor planets in this number range

== 183801–183900 ==
back to top

| Named minor planet | Provisional | This minor planet was named for... | Ref · Catalog |
|---|---|---|---|
There are no named minor planets in this number range

== 183901–184000 ==
back to top

| Named minor planet | Provisional | This minor planet was named for... | Ref · Catalog |
|---|---|---|---|
There are no named minor planets in this number range

back to top

| Preceded by 182,001–183,000 | Meanings of minor-planet names List of minor planets: 183,001–184,000 | Succeeded by 184,001–185,000 |
