= Mohan Padmanabhan =

Indian economist and journalist

Mohan Padmanabhan is an Indian economist and journalist. He writes for a number of major financial newspapers including The Hindu Business Line.

In the 1990s he was Deputy Chief of the News Bureau of the newspaper The Hindu Business Line. He is based in Kolkata.
