= Vijay Padmanabhan =

Vijay Padmanabhan is a law Professor at Benjamin N. Cardozo School of Law at Yeshiva University, who was formerly a senior lawyer for the United States Department of State.

Padmanabhan's duties at the State Department included negotiating for other countries to seek homes for former Guantanamo captives. After leaving government service Padmanabhan called the Guantanamo military commissions "an abject failure".
