= Daniel Eisenstein =

American cosmologist and academic

Daniel Eisenstein (born 1970) is an American cosmologist and academic. Eisenstein's PhD (1996) is from Harvard University under the supervision of Abraham Loeb. He held postdoctoral positions at the Institute for Advanced Study and the University of Chicago before moving to the University of Arizona as a professor in 2001. He moved to his current position as a professor of astronomy at Harvard University in 2010. He was joint-winner of the 2014 Shaw Prize. An asteroid (183287 Deisenstein) was named in his honor.

He is well known for his landmark work on baryon acoustic oscillations (BAO) as a tool for measuring the large-scale structure of the universe, and for his leadership roles in major astronomical surveys, including the Sloan Digital Sky Survey (SDSS) and the Dark Energy Spectroscopic Instrument (DESI). He was Director of Sloan Digital Sky Survey III from 2007 to 2015, and the co-Spokesperson of the Dark Energy Spectroscopic Instrument from 2014 to 2020.
