= Will Percival =

British cosmologist and astrophysicist

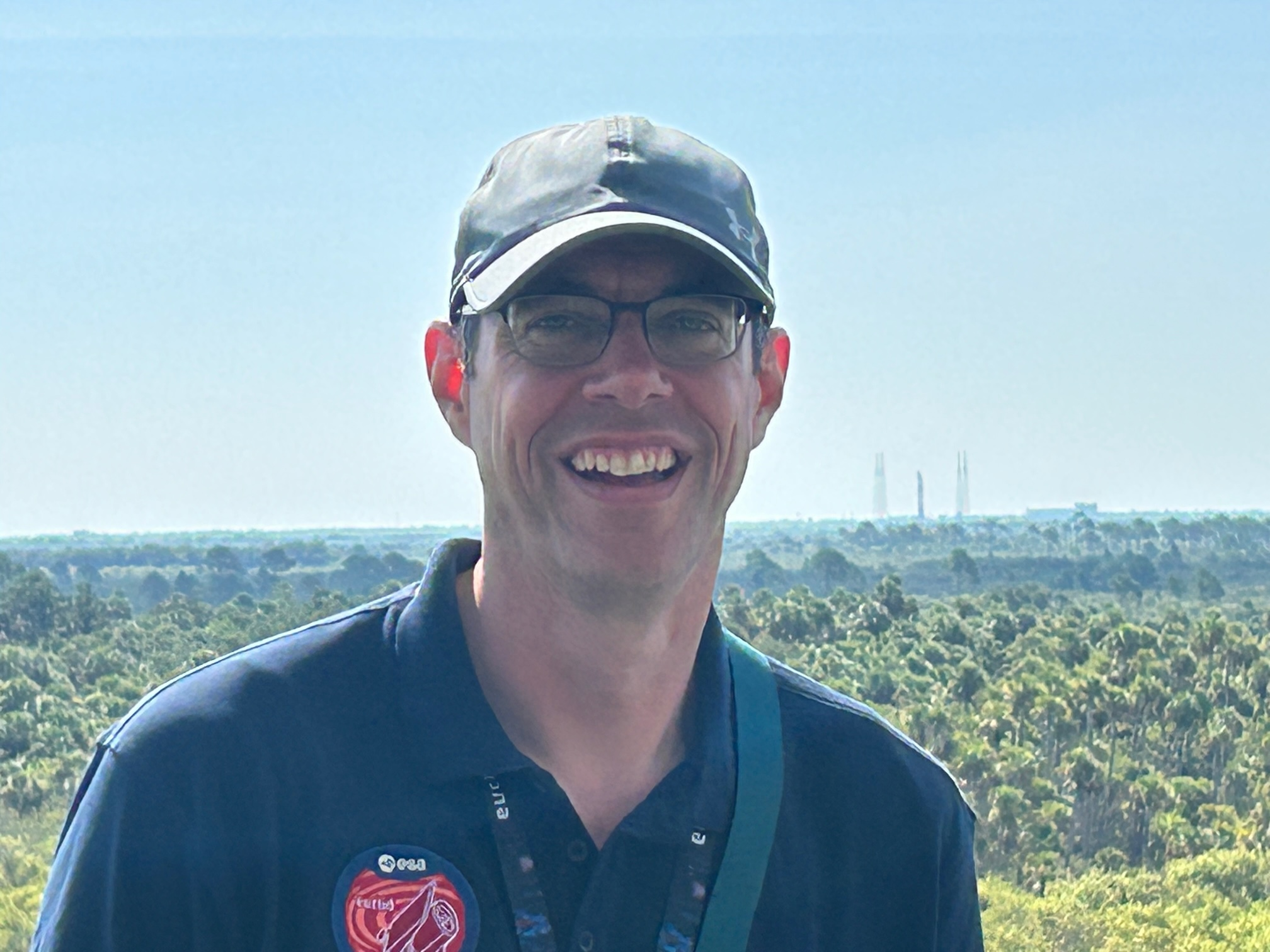
- Percival at the Euclid launch from Cape Canaveral, Florida, on July 1, 2023.
- Born: England
- Education: University of Oxford (PhD, 1999)
- Awards: Philip Leverhulme Prize (2007), Royal Astronomical Society Fowler Prize (2008), Royal Astronomical Society Team Award (2008), Distinguished Scientist Fellowship, Chinese Academy of Sciences (2016), Fellow of the Royal Society of Canada (2025)
- Scientific career
- Fields: Cosmology, Astrophysics
- Workplaces: Waterloo Centre for Astrophysics, University of Waterloo; Perimeter Institute for Theoretical Physics

Will Percival is a British-Canadian cosmologist and astrophysicist whose research focuses on the large‑scale structure of the Universe, using observations of the spatial distribution of galaxies to study cosmological expansion and dark energy. He is a professor of astrophysics at the University of Waterloo, director of the Waterloo Centre for Astrophysics, and an associate faculty member at the Perimeter Institute for Theoretical Physics.

== Early life and education ==
Percival was born in England and developed an early interest in mathematics. He transitioned into astrophysics and cosmology during his postgraduate studies at the University of Oxford in 1999, where his doctoral work focused on observational cosmology and quasar studies.

== Academic career ==
Percival held academic positions in the United Kingdom before moving to Canada. From 2005 to 2018, he was Professor of Cosmology at the Institute of Cosmology and Gravitation at the University of Portsmouth, where he played a leading role in large galaxy survey projects.

In 2018, he joined the University of Waterloo as a professor in the Department of Physics and Astronomy. He holds the Mike and Ophelia Lazaridis Distinguished Research Chair in Astrophysics and serves as director of the Waterloo Centre for Astrophysics. He is also an associate faculty member at the Perimeter Institute for Theoretical Physics.

== Research and contributions ==
Percival's research focuses on observational cosmology and the statistical analysis of galaxy distributions on the largest scales. His work uses large spectroscopic surveys of galaxies and quasars to reconstruct the expansion history of the Universe and study the nature of dark energy.

A central aspect of his work is the use of baryon acoustic oscillations, patterns imprinted in the distribution of galaxies by sound waves in the early Universe. These patterns serve as a "standard ruler" for measuring cosmological distances and constraining models of cosmic expansion. Measurements of baryon acoustic oscillations in galaxy surveys provide an independent method for determining the expansion history of the Universe and probing the properties of dark energy. Percival has been a major contributor to the development of baryon acoustic oscillations as a precision cosmological probe. In 2001, he used data from the Two-degree-Field Galaxy Redshift Survey to detect the signature of baryons in the distribution of galaxies. This forms a pillar of modern cosmology, and creates particularly strong constraints when combined with data from the CMB. The subsequent work using data from the Sloan Digital Sky Survey (SDSS) and related experiments showed how galaxy clustering measurements could determine the distance–redshift relation and constrain cosmological parameters, helping establish baryon acoustic oscillations as a central tool in modern cosmology.

Percival has held senior roles in several major international galaxy survey collaborations, including the 2dF Galaxy Redshift Survey, the Sloan Digital Sky Survey, the Baryon Oscillation Spectroscopic Survey (BOSS) and extended BOSS (eBOSS), the Dark Energy Spectroscopic Instrument (DESI), and the Euclid satellite mission of the European Space Agency. He served as Survey Scientist for the extended Baryon Oscillation Spectroscopic Survey (eBOSS), part of the Sloan Digital Sky Survey, which mapped the distribution of millions of galaxies and quasars and enabled measurements of the expansion history of the Universe across more than 11 billion years of cosmic time.

Percival also helps to lead the Dark Energy Spectroscopic Instrument (DESI), serving as spokesperson since 2024.. DESI has produced the largest three‑dimensional maps of the Universe to date. By analyzing the distribution of millions of galaxies and quasars, these surveys allow astronomers to reconstruct how cosmic expansion has evolved over time. These maps enable high‑precision measurements of cosmic expansion and provide new tests of dark energy models.

Recent analyses of BAO with the DESI data, are mildly discrepant with CMB measurements, potentially pointing to a need for revisions to the standard cosmological model. These findings have been described as potentially very important for the field of cosmology, as they challenge the prevailing ΛCDM model and motivate new theoretical frameworks.

In addition, Percival is one of the scientific leads for the European Space Agency's Euclid mission, which aims to map billions of galaxies to study the large‑scale structure of the Universe. His work involves applying statistical methods to galaxy distributions to measure a standard cosmological distance scale and investigate the causes of cosmic acceleration. Together with DESI and earlier SDSS surveys, these projects form part of a long‑term international effort to achieve increasingly precise measurements of cosmic structure and expansion across cosmic time.

== Honours and awards ==
Percival has received numerous honours for his contributions to cosmology, including:

- Fellow of the Royal Society of Canada (elected 2025)
- Mike & Ophelia Lazaridis Distinguished Research Chair in Astrophysics, University of Waterloo (2018)
- Distinguished Scientist Fellowship, Chinese Academy of Sciences (2016)
- Royal Astronomical Society Group Award (2008), as a member of the 2dF Galaxy Redshift Survey collaboration
- Fowler Award (A) of the Royal Astronomical Society (2008), recognizing early‑career contributions to astronomy
- Philip Leverhulme Prize (2007), awarded for outstanding research achievement

He has also been repeatedly named a highly cited researcher by Clarivate Analytics (2015-16, 2019-23), reflecting the influence of his work in physics and astronomy.

== Professional service ==
In addition to his research, Percival has served on advisory and review panels for national and international science organizations, including the European Space Agency and the UK Space Agency. He has contributed to the scientific planning and oversight of cosmological surveys through these advisory roles. He is also active in graduate education and public outreach, including university teaching and public lectures on cosmology and galaxy surveys

== See also ==
- Observational cosmology
- Large-scale structure of the Universe
- Baryon acoustic oscillations
- Dark energy
