= Meanings of minor-planet names: 185001–186000 =

As minor planet discoveries are confirmed, they are given a permanent number by the IAU's Minor Planet Center (MPC), and the discoverers can then submit names for them, following the IAU's naming conventions. The list below concerns those minor planets in the specified number-range that have received names, and explains the meanings of those names.

Official naming citations of newly named small Solar System bodies are approved and published in a bulletin by IAU's Working Group for Small Bodies Nomenclature (WGSBN). Before May 2021, citations were published in MPC's Minor Planet Circulars for many decades. Recent citations can also be found on the JPL Small-Body Database (SBDB). Until his death in 2016, German astronomer Lutz D. Schmadel compiled these citations into the Dictionary of Minor Planet Names (DMP) and regularly updated the collection.

Based on Paul Herget's The Names of the Minor Planets, Schmadel also researched the unclear origin of numerous asteroids, most of which had been named prior to World War II. This article incorporates text from this source, which is in the public domain: SBDB New namings may only be added to this list below after official publication as the preannouncement of names is condemned. The WGSBN publishes a comprehensive guideline for the naming rules of non-cometary small Solar System bodies.

== 185001–185100 ==
Named minor planet	Provisional	This minor planet was named for...	Ref · Catalog
185020 Pratte	2006 QV_{33}	John R. Pratte (born 1941) is an associate who has been instrumental in the construction of instrumentation at the U.S. Astronomical Research Observatory (H55) in Charleston, Illinois	JPL · 185020
185039 Alessiapossenti	2006 QG_{137}	Alessia Possenti (born 1972), daughter-in-law of Italian amateur astronomer Vincenzo Casulli who discovered this minor planet	JPL · 185039

== 185101–185200 ==
back to top

Named minor planet	Provisional	This minor planet was named for...	Ref · Catalog
185101 Balearicuni	2006 SX_{19}	The University of the Balearic Islands (UIB; Catalan: Universitat de les Illes Balears, Spanish: Universidad de las Islas Baleares) is a Balearic Spanish university, founded in 1978 and located in Palma on the island of Majorca.	IAU · 185101
185150 Panevezys	2006 SP_{161}	Panevėžys, a city of Lithuania	JPL · 185150
185164 Ingeburgherz	2006 SL_{218}	Ingeburg Herz (born 1920), co-owner of Tchibo and one of the most successful German entrepreneurs	JPL · 185164
185196 Vámbéry	2006 TR_{10}	Ármin Vámbéry (1832–1913), a Hungarian orientalist, traveler, university professor and a full member of the Hungarian Academy of Sciences.	IAU · 185196

== 185201–185300 ==
back to top

Named minor planet	Provisional	This minor planet was named for...	Ref · Catalog
185216 Gueiren	2006 TA_{57}	Gueiren (meaning all to be benevolent), is the earliest developed area in Taiwan	JPL · 185216
185250 Korostyshiv	2006 UY_{62}	Korostyshiv, an ancient city in Ukraine located on the Teteriv river	JPL · 185250

== 185301–185400 ==
back to top

Named minor planet	Provisional	This minor planet was named for...	Ref · Catalog
185312 Yvonnemarschall	2006 UV_{325}	Yvonne Marschall-Heinis, Swiss medical-practice assistant.	IAU · 185312
185321 Kammerlander	2006 VJ_{2}	Hans Kammerlander (born 1956), an Italian mountaineer and explorer, who has climbed twelve of the world's fourteen 8000-m mountains.	JPL · 185321
185325 Anupabhagwat	2006 VE_{14}	Anupama Bhagwat (born 1974), an Indian sitar player and composer of Hindustani classical music	JPL · 185325
185364 Sunweihsin	2006 VQ_{103}	Wei-Hsin Sun (born 1957), director of National Museum of Natural Science in Taiwan	JPL · 185364

== 185401–185500 ==
back to top

Named minor planet	Provisional	This minor planet was named for...	Ref · Catalog
185448 Nomentum	2006 YK_{13}	Mentana, an Italian town near Rome. The town's ancient name was "Nomentum", to which the Via Nomentana led from Rome.	JPL · 185448
185484 Czochralski	2007 DB_{85}	Jan Czochralski (1885–1952), a Polish chemist.	IAU · 185484
185498 Majorcastroinst	2007 SN	The Institute of Astronomy and Astronautics of Mallorca (IAAM; Spanish: Instituto de Astronomía y Astronáutica de Mallorca) a non-profit multidisciplinary scientific entity, made up of entrepreneurs from different areas of science and knowledge, founded to promote science and technology in Balearic society (Src).	IAU · 185498

== 185501–185600 ==
back to top

Named minor planet	Provisional	This minor planet was named for...	Ref · Catalog
185535 Gangda	2007 WH_{56}	GangDa, the Chinese abbreviation for the University of Hong Kong (Xiang Gang Da Xue), is the first and foremost tertiary institution in Hong Kong	JPL · 185535
185538 Fangcheng	2007 XD_{28}	Fang Cheng (born 1938), Chinese astrophysicist	JPL · 185538
185546 Yushan	2007 YU_{31}	Yu Shan (3,952 m), the highest mountain of Taiwan, located in the Jade Mountain Range	JPL · 185546
185554 Bikushev	2008 AB_{5}	Artyom Bikushev (1986–2008), a student at Kazan State University	JPL · 185554
185560 Harrykroto	2008 AQ_{31}	Harry Kroto (born 1939), an English chemist and Fellow of the Royal Society	JPL · 185560
185561 Miquelsiquier	2008 AV_{31}	Miquel Siquier Capó (born 1955), professor of mathematics and former president of the Institute of Astronomy and Astronautics of Mallorca (Src).	IAU · 185561
185576 Covichi	2008 BL_{15}	Covadonga Lacruz Camblor (born 1990), daughter of Spanish astronomer Juan Lacruz who discovered this minor planet. "Covichi" is her nickname.	JPL · 185576
185577 Hhaihao	2008 BA_{16}	The Chinese city of Haikou (Hhaihao City), capital and most populous city of the province of Hainan	MPC · 185577
185578 Agustínelcasta	2008 BJ_{16}	Agustin Martinez (b. 1963), known as Agustin El Casta, is a Mallorcan humorist	IAU · 185578
185579 Jorgejuan	2008 BS_{16}	Jorge Juan y Santacilia (1713–1773) was a Spanish sailor who founded the Royal Observatory of Madrid in 1757. He measured the length of the terrestrial meridian and determined that Earth is an oblate spheroid.	IAU · 185579
185580 Andratx	2008 BV_{18}	The Spanish village of Andratx, located in the west of the island of Mallorca	MPC · 185580

== 185601–185700 ==
back to top

Named minor planet	Provisional	This minor planet was named for...	Ref · Catalog
185633 Rainbach	2008 DO	The municipality of Rainbach, Austria, where the discovering Gaisberg Observatory (German: Sternwarte Gaisberg) is located	JPL · 185633
185636 Shiao Lin	2008 DV_{40}	Literally "Little Forest" in Mandarin Chinese, a village in Kaohsiung, Taiwan which was buried in a landslide caused by Typhoon Morakot on August 8, 2009	JPL · 185636
185638 Erwinschwab	2008 EU_{7}	Erwin Schwab (born 1964), German amateur astronomer and discoverer of minor planets	JPL · 185638
185639 Rainerkling	2008 EH_{8}	Rainer Kling (born 1952), German amateur astronomer and discoverer of minor planets	JPL · 185639
185640 Sunyisui	2008 EB_{34}	Sun Yisui (born 1936) is an astronomer who has made contributions to both celestial mechanics and nonlinear dynamics. Elected an academician of the Chinese Academy of Sciences in 1997	JPL · 185640
185641 Judd	2008 EH_{69}	Michele Judd (born 1965) was a senior engineer in the Jet Propulsion Laboratory Science Division 32 from 2003 to 2008	JPL · 185641

== 185701–185800 ==
back to top

Named minor planet	Provisional	This minor planet was named for...	Ref · Catalog
185733 Luigicolzani	1998 WW_{30}	Luigi Colzani (1922–2015), an enthusiastic and helpful collaborator at Sormano Astronomical Observatory (587) in Italy	JPL · 185733
185744 Hogan	1999 FK_{90}	Craig Hogan (born 1955), an American astrophysicist with the Sloan Digital Sky Survey	JPL · 185744
185757 Kareltrutnovský	1999 TK_{15}	Karel Trutnovský, Czech geodesist, cartographer and astronomer.	IAU · 185757

== 185801–185900 ==
back to top

Named minor planet	Provisional	This minor planet was named for...	Ref · Catalog
There are no named minor planets in this number range

== 185901–186000 ==
back to top

Named minor planet	Provisional	This minor planet was named for...	Ref · Catalog
There are no named minor planets in this number range

back to top

Preceded by 184,001–185,000	Meanings of minor-planet names List of minor planets: 185,001–186,000	Succeeded by 186,001–187,000
