= List of minor planets: 185001–186000 =

The following is a partial list of minor planets, running from minor-planet number 185001 through 186000, inclusive. The primary data for this and other partial lists is based on JPL's "Small-Body Orbital Elements" and data available from the Minor Planet Center. Critical list information is also provided by the MPC, unless otherwise specified from Lowell Observatory. A detailed description of the table's columns and additional sources are given on the main page including a complete list of every page in this series, and a statistical break-up on the dynamical classification of minor planets.

Also see the summary list of all named bodies in numerical and alphabetical order, and the corresponding naming citations for the number range of this particular list. New namings may only be added to this list after official publication, as the preannouncement of names is condemned by the Working Group for Small Bodies Nomenclature of the International Astronomical Union.

Near-Earth obj.	MBA (inner)	MBA (outer)	Centaur
Mars-crosser	MBA (middle)	Jupiter trojan	Trans-Neptunian obj.
Unclassified

== 185001–185100 ==
Designation			Discovery			Properties		Ref
Permanent	Provisional	Named after	Date	Site	Discoverer(s)	Category	Diam.	Ref
185001	2006 PT_{6}	—	August 12, 2006	Palomar	NEAT	KOR	2.0 km	MPC · JPL
185002	2006 PB_{7}	—	August 12, 2006	Palomar	NEAT	·	1.7 km	MPC · JPL
185003	2006 PC_{9}	—	August 13, 2006	Palomar	NEAT	·	1.1 km	MPC · JPL
185004	2006 PD_{9}	—	August 13, 2006	Palomar	NEAT	·	1.1 km	MPC · JPL
185005	2006 PJ_{9}	—	August 13, 2006	Palomar	NEAT	BRA	2.6 km	MPC · JPL
185006	2006 PD_{12}	—	August 13, 2006	Palomar	NEAT	·	3.0 km	MPC · JPL
185007	2006 PV_{16}	—	August 15, 2006	Palomar	NEAT	·	1.0 km	MPC · JPL
185008	2006 PE_{27}	—	August 15, 2006	Palomar	NEAT	·	1.1 km	MPC · JPL
185009	2006 PO_{30}	—	August 12, 2006	Palomar	NEAT	EMA	6.4 km	MPC · JPL
185010	2006 PR_{31}	—	August 14, 2006	Siding Spring	SSS	V	870 m	MPC · JPL
185011	2006 PM_{38}	—	August 14, 2006	Palomar	NEAT	MAS	1 km	MPC · JPL
185012	2006 QJ_{3}	—	August 17, 2006	Palomar	NEAT	H	950 m	MPC · JPL
185013	2006 QQ_{8}	—	August 19, 2006	Kitt Peak	Spacewatch	·	1.4 km	MPC · JPL
185014	2006 QT_{17}	—	August 17, 2006	Palomar	NEAT	·	1.8 km	MPC · JPL
185015	2006 QS_{21}	—	August 19, 2006	Anderson Mesa	LONEOS	·	880 m	MPC · JPL
185016	2006 QN_{25}	—	August 18, 2006	Kitt Peak	Spacewatch	·	900 m	MPC · JPL
185017	2006 QU_{27}	—	August 20, 2006	Palomar	NEAT	V	760 m	MPC · JPL
185018	2006 QY_{28}	—	August 21, 2006	Kitt Peak	Spacewatch	·	1.7 km	MPC · JPL
185019	2006 QP_{29}	—	August 17, 2006	Palomar	NEAT	KOR	2.4 km	MPC · JPL
185020 Pratte	2006 QV_{33}	Pratte	August 23, 2006	Antares	R. Holmes	·	2.5 km	MPC · JPL
185021	2006 QB_{38}	—	August 16, 2006	Siding Spring	SSS	V	1.1 km	MPC · JPL
185022	2006 QY_{38}	—	August 18, 2006	Anderson Mesa	LONEOS	·	1.0 km	MPC · JPL
185023	2006 QV_{56}	—	August 24, 2006	Socorro	LINEAR	·	1.9 km	MPC · JPL
185024	2006 QT_{59}	—	August 19, 2006	Palomar	NEAT	·	3.1 km	MPC · JPL
185025	2006 QF_{61}	—	August 21, 2006	Socorro	LINEAR	EUN	2.7 km	MPC · JPL
185026	2006 QV_{63}	—	August 24, 2006	Palomar	NEAT	·	1.3 km	MPC · JPL
185027	2006 QP_{64}	—	August 27, 2006	Kitt Peak	Spacewatch	KOR	1.9 km	MPC · JPL
185028	2006 QL_{68}	—	August 21, 2006	Kitt Peak	Spacewatch	·	1.4 km	MPC · JPL
185029	2006 QG_{78}	—	August 22, 2006	Palomar	NEAT	·	950 m	MPC · JPL
185030	2006 QW_{83}	—	August 27, 2006	Kitt Peak	Spacewatch	NYS	1.4 km	MPC · JPL
185031	2006 QE_{87}	—	August 27, 2006	Kitt Peak	Spacewatch	·	970 m	MPC · JPL
185032	2006 QX_{93}	—	August 16, 2006	Palomar	NEAT	·	2.8 km	MPC · JPL
185033	2006 QZ_{115}	—	August 27, 2006	Anderson Mesa	LONEOS	·	1.8 km	MPC · JPL
185034	2006 QO_{118}	—	August 27, 2006	Anderson Mesa	LONEOS	·	1.9 km	MPC · JPL
185035	2006 QV_{119}	—	August 28, 2006	Catalina	CSS	·	1.4 km	MPC · JPL
185036	2006 QX_{119}	—	August 28, 2006	Catalina	CSS	·	3.1 km	MPC · JPL
185037	2006 QJ_{123}	—	August 29, 2006	Catalina	CSS	·	2.7 km	MPC · JPL
185038	2006 QU_{123}	—	August 29, 2006	Anderson Mesa	LONEOS	·	3.3 km	MPC · JPL
185039 Alessiapossenti	2006 QG_{137}	Alessiapossenti	August 30, 2006	Vallemare di Borbona	V. S. Casulli	·	1.6 km	MPC · JPL
185040	2006 QS_{137}	—	August 29, 2006	Anderson Mesa	LONEOS	H	1.0 km	MPC · JPL
185041	2006 QR_{144}	—	August 21, 2006	Socorro	LINEAR	·	2.2 km	MPC · JPL
185042	2006 QF_{147}	—	August 18, 2006	Kitt Peak	Spacewatch	·	1.3 km	MPC · JPL
185043	2006 QA_{153}	—	August 19, 2006	Kitt Peak	Spacewatch	KOR	2.1 km	MPC · JPL
185044	2006 QW_{156}	—	August 19, 2006	Kitt Peak	Spacewatch	·	1.4 km	MPC · JPL
185045	2006 QT_{168}	—	August 30, 2006	Anderson Mesa	LONEOS	·	970 m	MPC · JPL
185046	2006 RH_{4}	—	September 12, 2006	Catalina	CSS	·	840 m	MPC · JPL
185047	2006 RQ_{4}	—	September 12, 2006	Catalina	CSS	·	1.7 km	MPC · JPL
185048	2006 RS_{4}	—	September 12, 2006	Catalina	CSS	H	870 m	MPC · JPL
185049	2006 RT_{4}	—	September 12, 2006	Catalina	CSS	·	900 m	MPC · JPL
185050	2006 RL_{6}	—	September 14, 2006	Catalina	CSS	·	1.7 km	MPC · JPL
185051	2006 RV_{7}	—	September 12, 2006	Catalina	CSS	NYS	1.3 km	MPC · JPL
185052	2006 RH_{9}	—	September 12, 2006	Catalina	CSS	(5)	3.1 km	MPC · JPL
185053	2006 RU_{17}	—	September 14, 2006	Palomar	NEAT	·	5.4 km	MPC · JPL
185054	2006 RA_{19}	—	September 14, 2006	Kitt Peak	Spacewatch	MAS	980 m	MPC · JPL
185055	2006 RP_{19}	—	September 14, 2006	Catalina	CSS	·	4.1 km	MPC · JPL
185056	2006 RA_{22}	—	September 15, 2006	Catalina	CSS	·	1.6 km	MPC · JPL
185057	2006 RH_{22}	—	September 15, 2006	Palomar	NEAT	·	3.3 km	MPC · JPL
185058	2006 RL_{23}	—	September 12, 2006	Catalina	CSS	·	1.3 km	MPC · JPL
185059	2006 RY_{24}	—	September 14, 2006	Kitt Peak	Spacewatch	·	5.1 km	MPC · JPL
185060	2006 RW_{27}	—	September 14, 2006	Palomar	NEAT	·	3.4 km	MPC · JPL
185061	2006 RB_{28}	—	September 14, 2006	Kitt Peak	Spacewatch	·	2.8 km	MPC · JPL
185062	2006 RL_{30}	—	September 15, 2006	Kitt Peak	Spacewatch	slow	3.1 km	MPC · JPL
185063	2006 RF_{31}	—	September 15, 2006	Kitt Peak	Spacewatch	·	2.4 km	MPC · JPL
185064	2006 RJ_{32}	—	September 15, 2006	Kitt Peak	Spacewatch	·	2.1 km	MPC · JPL
185065	2006 RO_{37}	—	September 12, 2006	Catalina	CSS	·	1.7 km	MPC · JPL
185066	2006 RT_{43}	—	September 14, 2006	Kitt Peak	Spacewatch	·	740 m	MPC · JPL
185067	2006 RW_{43}	—	September 14, 2006	Kitt Peak	Spacewatch	THM	2.9 km	MPC · JPL
185068	2006 RJ_{44}	—	September 14, 2006	Kitt Peak	Spacewatch	MAS	920 m	MPC · JPL
185069	2006 RQ_{45}	—	September 14, 2006	Kitt Peak	Spacewatch	·	840 m	MPC · JPL
185070	2006 RR_{50}	—	September 14, 2006	Kitt Peak	Spacewatch	KOR	1.6 km	MPC · JPL
185071	2006 RM_{55}	—	September 14, 2006	Kitt Peak	Spacewatch	V	880 m	MPC · JPL
185072	2006 RV_{57}	—	September 15, 2006	Kitt Peak	Spacewatch	·	1.5 km	MPC · JPL
185073	2006 RG_{59}	—	September 15, 2006	Kitt Peak	Spacewatch	MAS	710 m	MPC · JPL
185074	2006 RE_{60}	—	September 15, 2006	Kitt Peak	Spacewatch	MAS	1.0 km	MPC · JPL
185075	2006 RB_{62}	—	September 12, 2006	Catalina	CSS	V	1.1 km	MPC · JPL
185076	2006 RZ_{69}	—	September 15, 2006	Kitt Peak	Spacewatch	MAS	910 m	MPC · JPL
185077	2006 RL_{71}	—	September 15, 2006	Kitt Peak	Spacewatch	·	1.4 km	MPC · JPL
185078	2006 RH_{72}	—	September 15, 2006	Kitt Peak	Spacewatch	AST	2.0 km	MPC · JPL
185079	2006 RM_{72}	—	September 15, 2006	Kitt Peak	Spacewatch	·	1.6 km	MPC · JPL
185080	2006 RJ_{73}	—	September 15, 2006	Kitt Peak	Spacewatch	·	2.1 km	MPC · JPL
185081	2006 RT_{73}	—	September 15, 2006	Kitt Peak	Spacewatch	·	1.4 km	MPC · JPL
185082	2006 RN_{74}	—	September 15, 2006	Kitt Peak	Spacewatch	·	1.6 km	MPC · JPL
185083	2006 RU_{78}	—	September 15, 2006	Kitt Peak	Spacewatch	·	3.5 km	MPC · JPL
185084	2006 RR_{87}	—	September 15, 2006	Kitt Peak	Spacewatch	·	930 m	MPC · JPL
185085	2006 RG_{92}	—	September 15, 2006	Kitt Peak	Spacewatch	slow?	2.0 km	MPC · JPL
185086	2006 RP_{92}	—	September 15, 2006	Kitt Peak	Spacewatch	·	3.1 km	MPC · JPL
185087	2006 RA_{93}	—	September 15, 2006	Kitt Peak	Spacewatch	·	1 km	MPC · JPL
185088	2006 RD_{93}	—	September 15, 2006	Kitt Peak	Spacewatch	·	1.0 km	MPC · JPL
185089	2006 RF_{93}	—	September 15, 2006	Kitt Peak	Spacewatch	CYB	5.0 km	MPC · JPL
185090	2006 RQ_{97}	—	September 15, 2006	Kitt Peak	Spacewatch	·	810 m	MPC · JPL
185091	2006 RG_{99}	—	September 15, 2006	Kitt Peak	Spacewatch	·	1.8 km	MPC · JPL
185092	2006 RS_{99}	—	September 12, 2006	Catalina	CSS	NYS	1.3 km	MPC · JPL
185093	2006 RV_{104}	—	September 14, 2006	Kitt Peak	Spacewatch	V	690 m	MPC · JPL
185094	2006 RD_{105}	—	September 14, 2006	Kitt Peak	Spacewatch	·	3.1 km	MPC · JPL
185095	2006 SS_{5}	—	September 16, 2006	Palomar	NEAT	·	1.2 km	MPC · JPL
185096	2006 ST_{5}	—	September 16, 2006	Palomar	NEAT	·	3.2 km	MPC · JPL
185097	2006 SB_{11}	—	September 16, 2006	Catalina	CSS	·	3.3 km	MPC · JPL
185098	2006 SJ_{13}	—	September 17, 2006	Socorro	LINEAR	·	1.5 km	MPC · JPL
185099	2006 SK_{13}	—	September 17, 2006	Socorro	LINEAR	ADE	3.0 km	MPC · JPL
185100	2006 SY_{16}	—	September 17, 2006	Kitt Peak	Spacewatch	·	1.6 km	MPC · JPL

== 185101–185200 ==
back to top

Designation			Discovery			Properties		Ref
Permanent	Provisional	Named after	Date	Site	Discoverer(s)	Category	Diam.	Ref
185101 Balearicuni	2006 SX_{19}	Balearicuni	September 19, 2006	OAM	OAM	·	2.4 km	MPC · JPL
185102	2006 SE_{20}	—	September 16, 2006	Catalina	CSS	EOS	2.4 km	MPC · JPL
185103	2006 SV_{20}	—	September 16, 2006	Anderson Mesa	LONEOS	·	1.0 km	MPC · JPL
185104	2006 SJ_{21}	—	September 16, 2006	Anderson Mesa	LONEOS	·	870 m	MPC · JPL
185105	2006 SV_{23}	—	September 18, 2006	Catalina	CSS	·	3.7 km	MPC · JPL
185106	2006 SN_{27}	—	September 16, 2006	Anderson Mesa	LONEOS	·	1.1 km	MPC · JPL
185107	2006 SA_{34}	—	September 17, 2006	Catalina	CSS	·	2.0 km	MPC · JPL
185108	2006 SM_{37}	—	September 17, 2006	Kitt Peak	Spacewatch	·	850 m	MPC · JPL
185109	2006 SS_{45}	—	September 18, 2006	Catalina	CSS	·	1.4 km	MPC · JPL
185110	2006 SV_{46}	—	September 19, 2006	Catalina	CSS	·	1.7 km	MPC · JPL
185111	2006 SK_{47}	—	September 19, 2006	Kitt Peak	Spacewatch	·	1.5 km	MPC · JPL
185112	2006 SK_{48}	—	September 19, 2006	Kitt Peak	Spacewatch	PHO	1.5 km	MPC · JPL
185113	2006 SP_{48}	—	September 16, 2006	Catalina	CSS	·	1.8 km	MPC · JPL
185114	2006 SB_{49}	—	September 18, 2006	Kitt Peak	Spacewatch	NEM	2.5 km	MPC · JPL
185115	2006 SV_{50}	—	September 17, 2006	Anderson Mesa	LONEOS	·	3.4 km	MPC · JPL
185116	2006 SO_{54}	—	September 18, 2006	Catalina	CSS	GEF	2.2 km	MPC · JPL
185117	2006 SP_{54}	—	September 18, 2006	Catalina	CSS	·	1.1 km	MPC · JPL
185118	2006 SC_{55}	—	September 18, 2006	Catalina	CSS	·	1.6 km	MPC · JPL
185119	2006 SH_{57}	—	September 17, 2006	Kitt Peak	Spacewatch	·	730 m	MPC · JPL
185120	2006 SD_{63}	—	September 18, 2006	Anderson Mesa	LONEOS	·	4.8 km	MPC · JPL
185121	2006 SK_{63}	—	September 20, 2006	Palomar	NEAT	·	3.2 km	MPC · JPL
185122	2006 SB_{69}	—	September 19, 2006	Kitt Peak	Spacewatch	·	1.4 km	MPC · JPL
185123	2006 SQ_{70}	—	September 19, 2006	Kitt Peak	Spacewatch	·	1.3 km	MPC · JPL
185124	2006 SZ_{70}	—	September 19, 2006	Kitt Peak	Spacewatch	V	920 m	MPC · JPL
185125	2006 ST_{73}	—	September 19, 2006	Kitt Peak	Spacewatch	·	860 m	MPC · JPL
185126	2006 SZ_{74}	—	September 19, 2006	Kitt Peak	Spacewatch	·	1.1 km	MPC · JPL
185127	2006 SY_{88}	—	September 18, 2006	Kitt Peak	Spacewatch	NYS	1.4 km	MPC · JPL
185128	2006 SB_{93}	—	September 18, 2006	Kitt Peak	Spacewatch	·	2.3 km	MPC · JPL
185129	2006 SF_{94}	—	September 18, 2006	Kitt Peak	Spacewatch	·	1.8 km	MPC · JPL
185130	2006 SH_{96}	—	September 18, 2006	Kitt Peak	Spacewatch	·	1.5 km	MPC · JPL
185131	2006 SM_{101}	—	September 19, 2006	Catalina	CSS	THM	4.3 km	MPC · JPL
185132	2006 SV_{104}	—	September 19, 2006	Kitt Peak	Spacewatch	·	1.9 km	MPC · JPL
185133	2006 SY_{110}	—	September 21, 2006	Goodricke-Pigott	R. A. Tucker	·	950 m	MPC · JPL
185134	2006 SF_{112}	—	September 22, 2006	Anderson Mesa	LONEOS	·	3.7 km	MPC · JPL
185135	2006 SP_{120}	—	September 18, 2006	Catalina	CSS	·	4.0 km	MPC · JPL
185136	2006 ST_{120}	—	September 18, 2006	Catalina	CSS	·	2.0 km	MPC · JPL
185137	2006 SG_{121}	—	September 18, 2006	Catalina	CSS	·	4.1 km	MPC · JPL
185138	2006 SE_{123}	—	September 19, 2006	Catalina	CSS	·	2.4 km	MPC · JPL
185139	2006 SS_{127}	—	September 25, 2006	Kitt Peak	Spacewatch	·	2.2 km	MPC · JPL
185140	2006 SE_{129}	—	September 17, 2006	Anderson Mesa	LONEOS	T_{j} (2.86) · CYB	5.0 km	MPC · JPL
185141	2006 SS_{130}	—	September 18, 2006	Calvin-Rehoboth	Calvin College	·	1.3 km	MPC · JPL
185142	2006 SE_{132}	—	September 16, 2006	Catalina	CSS	·	3.4 km	MPC · JPL
185143	2006 SJ_{138}	—	September 20, 2006	Anderson Mesa	LONEOS	GEF	1.7 km	MPC · JPL
185144	2006 SY_{149}	—	September 19, 2006	Kitt Peak	Spacewatch	·	2.1 km	MPC · JPL
185145	2006 SD_{155}	—	September 22, 2006	Socorro	LINEAR	NYS	1.7 km	MPC · JPL
185146	2006 SS_{157}	—	September 23, 2006	Kitt Peak	Spacewatch	·	1.2 km	MPC · JPL
185147	2006 SN_{159}	—	September 23, 2006	Kitt Peak	Spacewatch	·	1.5 km	MPC · JPL
185148	2006 SJ_{160}	—	September 23, 2006	Kitt Peak	Spacewatch	·	1.2 km	MPC · JPL
185149	2006 SX_{160}	—	September 23, 2006	Kitt Peak	Spacewatch	·	880 m	MPC · JPL
185150 Panevėžys	2006 SP_{161}	Panevėžys	September 23, 2006	Moletai	K. Černis	·	1.3 km	MPC · JPL
185151	2006 SC_{189}	—	September 26, 2006	Kitt Peak	Spacewatch	·	3.5 km	MPC · JPL
185152	2006 SK_{192}	—	September 26, 2006	Mount Lemmon	Mount Lemmon Survey	·	1.4 km	MPC · JPL
185153	2006 SP_{192}	—	September 26, 2006	Mount Lemmon	Mount Lemmon Survey	·	660 m	MPC · JPL
185154	2006 SJ_{195}	—	September 26, 2006	Kitt Peak	Spacewatch	·	2.0 km	MPC · JPL
185155	2006 SA_{198}	—	September 27, 2006	Goodricke-Pigott	R. A. Tucker	·	820 m	MPC · JPL
185156	2006 SN_{200}	—	September 24, 2006	Kitt Peak	Spacewatch	KOR	1.8 km	MPC · JPL
185157	2006 SY_{203}	—	September 25, 2006	Kitt Peak	Spacewatch	·	940 m	MPC · JPL
185158	2006 SC_{206}	—	September 25, 2006	Kitt Peak	Spacewatch	·	2.6 km	MPC · JPL
185159	2006 SC_{212}	—	September 26, 2006	Mount Lemmon	Mount Lemmon Survey	MRX	1.2 km	MPC · JPL
185160	2006 SY_{212}	—	September 26, 2006	Kitt Peak	Spacewatch	·	1.6 km	MPC · JPL
185161	2006 SY_{214}	—	September 27, 2006	Kitt Peak	Spacewatch	·	1.5 km	MPC · JPL
185162	2006 SD_{215}	—	September 27, 2006	Kitt Peak	Spacewatch	(194)	1.9 km	MPC · JPL
185163	2006 SG_{216}	—	September 27, 2006	Kitt Peak	Spacewatch	·	1.4 km	MPC · JPL
185164 Ingeburgherz	2006 SL_{218}	Ingeburgherz	September 27, 2006	OAM	OAM	MRX	1.3 km	MPC · JPL
185165	2006 SK_{219}	—	September 23, 2006	Kitt Peak	Spacewatch	V	940 m	MPC · JPL
185166	2006 SA_{224}	—	September 25, 2006	Mount Lemmon	Mount Lemmon Survey	·	1.0 km	MPC · JPL
185167	2006 SP_{246}	—	September 26, 2006	Mount Lemmon	Mount Lemmon Survey	NYS	1.5 km	MPC · JPL
185168	2006 SB_{252}	—	September 26, 2006	Kitt Peak	Spacewatch	·	1.7 km	MPC · JPL
185169	2006 SG_{264}	—	September 26, 2006	Kitt Peak	Spacewatch	·	2.6 km	MPC · JPL
185170	2006 SY_{279}	—	September 28, 2006	Catalina	CSS	·	2.1 km	MPC · JPL
185171	2006 SK_{280}	—	September 29, 2006	Anderson Mesa	LONEOS	·	2.6 km	MPC · JPL
185172	2006 SP_{282}	—	September 25, 2006	Anderson Mesa	LONEOS	EOS	2.6 km	MPC · JPL
185173	2006 SY_{283}	—	September 26, 2006	Catalina	CSS	·	1.3 km	MPC · JPL
185174	2006 SG_{284}	—	September 27, 2006	Anderson Mesa	LONEOS	WIT	1.6 km	MPC · JPL
185175	2006 SB_{285}	—	September 29, 2006	Anderson Mesa	LONEOS	·	2.0 km	MPC · JPL
185176	2006 SX_{291}	—	September 21, 2006	Catalina	CSS	·	4.3 km	MPC · JPL
185177	2006 SK_{303}	—	September 27, 2006	Kitt Peak	Spacewatch	HOF	3.7 km	MPC · JPL
185178	2006 SP_{328}	—	September 27, 2006	Kitt Peak	Spacewatch	(5)	1.6 km	MPC · JPL
185179	2006 SG_{332}	—	September 28, 2006	Mount Lemmon	Mount Lemmon Survey	·	3.1 km	MPC · JPL
185180	2006 SQ_{341}	—	September 28, 2006	Mount Lemmon	Mount Lemmon Survey	·	1.9 km	MPC · JPL
185181	2006 SD_{344}	—	September 28, 2006	Kitt Peak	Spacewatch	·	2.7 km	MPC · JPL
185182	2006 SY_{344}	—	September 28, 2006	Kitt Peak	Spacewatch	·	2.7 km	MPC · JPL
185183	2006 SP_{345}	—	September 28, 2006	Kitt Peak	Spacewatch	·	1.5 km	MPC · JPL
185184	2006 SQ_{353}	—	September 30, 2006	Catalina	CSS	·	1.1 km	MPC · JPL
185185	2006 SF_{357}	—	September 30, 2006	Catalina	CSS	·	1.7 km	MPC · JPL
185186	2006 SV_{359}	—	September 30, 2006	Catalina	CSS	·	2.9 km	MPC · JPL
185187	2006 SN_{391}	—	September 18, 2006	Catalina	CSS	EUN	1.9 km	MPC · JPL
185188	2006 SM_{392}	—	September 25, 2006	Kitt Peak	Spacewatch	·	1.8 km	MPC · JPL
185189	2006 SA_{393}	—	September 27, 2006	Mount Lemmon	Mount Lemmon Survey	·	3.6 km	MPC · JPL
185190	2006 SA_{395}	—	September 30, 2006	Catalina	CSS	·	1.5 km	MPC · JPL
185191	2006 TB_{1}	—	October 3, 2006	Mount Lemmon	Mount Lemmon Survey	·	1.8 km	MPC · JPL
185192	2006 TV_{1}	—	October 1, 2006	Kitt Peak	Spacewatch	·	1.1 km	MPC · JPL
185193	2006 TW_{3}	—	October 2, 2006	Kitt Peak	Spacewatch	NYS	1.4 km	MPC · JPL
185194	2006 TY_{4}	—	October 2, 2006	Mount Lemmon	Mount Lemmon Survey	·	2.8 km	MPC · JPL
185195	2006 TX_{5}	—	October 2, 2006	Mount Lemmon	Mount Lemmon Survey	·	1.8 km	MPC · JPL
185196 Vámbéry	2006 TR_{10}	Vámbéry	October 15, 2006	Piszkéstető	K. Sárneczky, Z. Kuli	·	1.8 km	MPC · JPL
185197	2006 TP_{13}	—	October 10, 2006	Palomar	NEAT	(5)	1.8 km	MPC · JPL
185198	2006 TO_{23}	—	October 11, 2006	Kitt Peak	Spacewatch	·	2.1 km	MPC · JPL
185199	2006 TB_{25}	—	October 12, 2006	Kitt Peak	Spacewatch	·	3.8 km	MPC · JPL
185200	2006 TV_{25}	—	October 12, 2006	Kitt Peak	Spacewatch	KOR	1.6 km	MPC · JPL

== 185201–185300 ==
back to top

Designation			Discovery			Properties		Ref
Permanent	Provisional	Named after	Date	Site	Discoverer(s)	Category	Diam.	Ref
185201	2006 TX_{36}	—	October 12, 2006	Kitt Peak	Spacewatch	·	2.0 km	MPC · JPL
185202	2006 TD_{39}	—	October 12, 2006	Kitt Peak	Spacewatch	RAF	1.6 km	MPC · JPL
185203	2006 TN_{39}	—	October 12, 2006	Kitt Peak	Spacewatch	·	1.9 km	MPC · JPL
185204	2006 TM_{42}	—	October 12, 2006	Kitt Peak	Spacewatch	TIR	4.0 km	MPC · JPL
185205	2006 TZ_{43}	—	October 12, 2006	Kitt Peak	Spacewatch	·	1.6 km	MPC · JPL
185206	2006 TU_{44}	—	October 12, 2006	Kitt Peak	Spacewatch	·	2.1 km	MPC · JPL
185207	2006 TP_{47}	—	October 12, 2006	Kitt Peak	Spacewatch	·	1.9 km	MPC · JPL
185208	2006 TU_{47}	—	October 12, 2006	Kitt Peak	Spacewatch	·	1.3 km	MPC · JPL
185209	2006 TA_{48}	—	October 12, 2006	Kitt Peak	Spacewatch	AST	3.0 km	MPC · JPL
185210	2006 TN_{50}	—	October 12, 2006	Kitt Peak	Spacewatch	·	1.6 km	MPC · JPL
185211	2006 TQ_{50}	—	October 12, 2006	Kitt Peak	Spacewatch	(29841)	3.5 km	MPC · JPL
185212	2006 TB_{53}	—	October 12, 2006	Kitt Peak	Spacewatch	NYS	1.3 km	MPC · JPL
185213	2006 TN_{53}	—	October 12, 2006	Kitt Peak	Spacewatch	MAS	1.0 km	MPC · JPL
185214	2006 TZ_{54}	—	October 12, 2006	Palomar	NEAT	·	1.8 km	MPC · JPL
185215	2006 TP_{55}	—	October 12, 2006	Palomar	NEAT	·	1.3 km	MPC · JPL
185216 Gueiren	2006 TA_{57}	Gueiren	October 14, 2006	Lulin Observatory	Q. Ye, Lin, C. S.	·	2.1 km	MPC · JPL
185217	2006 TS_{57}	—	October 15, 2006	Catalina	CSS	·	3.4 km	MPC · JPL
185218	2006 TO_{59}	—	October 13, 2006	Kitt Peak	Spacewatch	·	3.4 km	MPC · JPL
185219	2006 TO_{61}	—	October 12, 2006	Kitt Peak	Spacewatch	·	2.5 km	MPC · JPL
185220	2006 TK_{62}	—	October 9, 2006	Palomar	NEAT	·	3.1 km	MPC · JPL
185221	2006 TK_{66}	—	October 11, 2006	Palomar	NEAT	AGN	1.7 km	MPC · JPL
185222	2006 TU_{66}	—	October 11, 2006	Palomar	NEAT	·	4.0 km	MPC · JPL
185223	2006 TS_{68}	—	October 11, 2006	Palomar	NEAT	·	920 m	MPC · JPL
185224	2006 TG_{70}	—	October 11, 2006	Kitt Peak	Spacewatch	·	4.7 km	MPC · JPL
185225	2006 TV_{74}	—	October 11, 2006	Palomar	NEAT	·	3.3 km	MPC · JPL
185226	2006 TH_{76}	—	October 11, 2006	Palomar	NEAT	·	1.2 km	MPC · JPL
185227	2006 TN_{76}	—	October 11, 2006	Palomar	NEAT	·	4.3 km	MPC · JPL
185228	2006 TT_{77}	—	October 12, 2006	Kitt Peak	Spacewatch	·	1.1 km	MPC · JPL
185229	2006 TS_{78}	—	October 12, 2006	Palomar	NEAT	·	4.2 km	MPC · JPL
185230	2006 TZ_{90}	—	October 13, 2006	Kitt Peak	Spacewatch	·	1.1 km	MPC · JPL
185231	2006 TM_{91}	—	October 13, 2006	Kitt Peak	Spacewatch	KOR	1.6 km	MPC · JPL
185232	2006 TX_{103}	—	October 15, 2006	Kitt Peak	Spacewatch	·	1.5 km	MPC · JPL
185233	2006 TY_{109}	—	October 12, 2006	Kitt Peak	Spacewatch	·	2.0 km	MPC · JPL
185234	2006 TH_{110}	—	October 13, 2006	Kitt Peak	Spacewatch	·	3.4 km	MPC · JPL
185235	2006 TA_{115}	—	October 1, 2006	Apache Point	A. C. Becker	·	4.8 km	MPC · JPL
185236	2006 TP_{120}	—	October 12, 2006	Apache Point	A. C. Becker	·	4.2 km	MPC · JPL
185237	2006 TP_{121}	—	October 13, 2006	Kitt Peak	Spacewatch	·	2.3 km	MPC · JPL
185238	2006 UK_{3}	—	October 16, 2006	Catalina	CSS	NYS	1.2 km	MPC · JPL
185239	2006 UZ_{6}	—	October 16, 2006	Catalina	CSS	·	3.2 km	MPC · JPL
185240	2006 UF_{12}	—	October 17, 2006	Mount Lemmon	Mount Lemmon Survey	·	2.2 km	MPC · JPL
185241	2006 UR_{15}	—	October 17, 2006	Mount Lemmon	Mount Lemmon Survey	·	4.1 km	MPC · JPL
185242	2006 UQ_{31}	—	October 16, 2006	Kitt Peak	Spacewatch	·	2.2 km	MPC · JPL
185243	2006 UJ_{37}	—	October 16, 2006	Kitt Peak	Spacewatch	V	1.1 km	MPC · JPL
185244	2006 UK_{38}	—	October 16, 2006	Kitt Peak	Spacewatch	·	3.4 km	MPC · JPL
185245	2006 UM_{45}	—	October 16, 2006	Kitt Peak	Spacewatch	·	1.8 km	MPC · JPL
185246	2006 UU_{54}	—	October 17, 2006	Catalina	CSS	·	1.6 km	MPC · JPL
185247	2006 UW_{57}	—	October 18, 2006	Kitt Peak	Spacewatch	NYS	1.0 km	MPC · JPL
185248	2006 UZ_{59}	—	October 19, 2006	Catalina	CSS	·	1.5 km	MPC · JPL
185249	2006 UE_{62}	—	October 17, 2006	Mount Lemmon	Mount Lemmon Survey	·	1.6 km	MPC · JPL
185250 Korostyshiv	2006 UY_{62}	Korostyshiv	October 17, 2006	Andrushivka	Andrushivka	·	4.4 km	MPC · JPL
185251	2006 UZ_{63}	—	October 20, 2006	Kitt Peak	Spacewatch	·	2.0 km	MPC · JPL
185252	2006 UT_{64}	—	October 17, 2006	Mount Lemmon	Mount Lemmon Survey	MAS	980 m	MPC · JPL
185253	2006 UR_{65}	—	October 16, 2006	Catalina	CSS	·	3.5 km	MPC · JPL
185254	2006 UM_{70}	—	October 16, 2006	Catalina	CSS	·	3.3 km	MPC · JPL
185255	2006 UW_{77}	—	October 17, 2006	Kitt Peak	Spacewatch	·	2.0 km	MPC · JPL
185256	2006 UX_{78}	—	October 17, 2006	Kitt Peak	Spacewatch	AGN	1.5 km	MPC · JPL
185257	2006 UW_{88}	—	October 17, 2006	Kitt Peak	Spacewatch	KOR	2.0 km	MPC · JPL
185258	2006 US_{92}	—	October 18, 2006	Kitt Peak	Spacewatch	·	1.1 km	MPC · JPL
185259	2006 UW_{92}	—	October 18, 2006	Kitt Peak	Spacewatch	MAS	850 m	MPC · JPL
185260	2006 UU_{100}	—	October 18, 2006	Kitt Peak	Spacewatch	·	1.1 km	MPC · JPL
185261	2006 UC_{120}	—	October 19, 2006	Kitt Peak	Spacewatch	·	1.4 km	MPC · JPL
185262	2006 UD_{124}	—	October 19, 2006	Kitt Peak	Spacewatch	(2076)	790 m	MPC · JPL
185263	2006 UK_{127}	—	October 19, 2006	Kitt Peak	Spacewatch	·	1.7 km	MPC · JPL
185264	2006 UC_{128}	—	October 19, 2006	Kitt Peak	Spacewatch	·	2.7 km	MPC · JPL
185265	2006 UE_{128}	—	October 19, 2006	Palomar	NEAT	·	1.3 km	MPC · JPL
185266	2006 UZ_{128}	—	October 19, 2006	Kitt Peak	Spacewatch	·	1.4 km	MPC · JPL
185267	2006 UZ_{134}	—	October 19, 2006	Kitt Peak	Spacewatch	KOR	1.6 km	MPC · JPL
185268	2006 UP_{138}	—	October 19, 2006	Kitt Peak	Spacewatch	·	1.6 km	MPC · JPL
185269	2006 UC_{142}	—	October 19, 2006	Kitt Peak	Spacewatch	·	2.0 km	MPC · JPL
185270	2006 UX_{143}	—	October 19, 2006	Kitt Peak	Spacewatch	·	1.7 km	MPC · JPL
185271	2006 UA_{154}	—	October 21, 2006	Kitt Peak	Spacewatch	·	910 m	MPC · JPL
185272	2006 UL_{159}	—	October 21, 2006	Mount Lemmon	Mount Lemmon Survey	KOR	1.4 km	MPC · JPL
185273	2006 UO_{170}	—	October 21, 2006	Mount Lemmon	Mount Lemmon Survey	·	1.9 km	MPC · JPL
185274	2006 UR_{174}	—	October 19, 2006	Catalina	CSS	V	970 m	MPC · JPL
185275	2006 UD_{176}	—	October 16, 2006	Catalina	CSS	·	1.9 km	MPC · JPL
185276	2006 UN_{179}	—	October 16, 2006	Catalina	CSS	·	2.3 km	MPC · JPL
185277	2006 UB_{181}	—	October 16, 2006	Catalina	CSS	·	2.3 km	MPC · JPL
185278	2006 UE_{182}	—	October 16, 2006	Catalina	CSS	·	3.5 km	MPC · JPL
185279	2006 UW_{188}	—	October 19, 2006	Catalina	CSS	·	4.6 km	MPC · JPL
185280	2006 UH_{192}	—	October 19, 2006	Catalina	CSS	·	2.6 km	MPC · JPL
185281	2006 UA_{196}	—	October 20, 2006	Kitt Peak	Spacewatch	(5)	1.9 km	MPC · JPL
185282	2006 US_{198}	—	October 20, 2006	Kitt Peak	Spacewatch	·	1.9 km	MPC · JPL
185283	2006 UG_{199}	—	October 20, 2006	Kitt Peak	Spacewatch	NYS	1.7 km	MPC · JPL
185284	2006 UJ_{201}	—	October 21, 2006	Kitt Peak	Spacewatch	·	2.0 km	MPC · JPL
185285	2006 UX_{202}	—	October 22, 2006	Palomar	NEAT	·	4.0 km	MPC · JPL
185286	2006 UH_{203}	—	October 22, 2006	Palomar	NEAT	·	1.7 km	MPC · JPL
185287	2006 UV_{204}	—	October 22, 2006	Palomar	NEAT	·	3.5 km	MPC · JPL
185288	2006 UW_{207}	—	October 23, 2006	Kitt Peak	Spacewatch	·	1.8 km	MPC · JPL
185289	2006 UM_{215}	—	October 20, 2006	Goodricke-Pigott	R. A. Tucker	(7744)	2.3 km	MPC · JPL
185290	2006 UB_{219}	—	October 16, 2006	Catalina	CSS	4:3	8.8 km	MPC · JPL
185291	2006 UT_{219}	—	October 16, 2006	Catalina	CSS	·	2.6 km	MPC · JPL
185292	2006 UJ_{226}	—	October 20, 2006	Kitt Peak	Spacewatch	KOR	1.9 km	MPC · JPL
185293	2006 UY_{227}	—	October 20, 2006	Palomar	NEAT	KOR	2.0 km	MPC · JPL
185294	2006 UW_{237}	—	October 23, 2006	Kitt Peak	Spacewatch	·	2.4 km	MPC · JPL
185295	2006 UN_{239}	—	October 23, 2006	Kitt Peak	Spacewatch	·	1.6 km	MPC · JPL
185296	2006 UO_{239}	—	October 23, 2006	Kitt Peak	Spacewatch	KOR	1.8 km	MPC · JPL
185297	2006 UK_{252}	—	October 27, 2006	Mount Lemmon	Mount Lemmon Survey	·	2.0 km	MPC · JPL
185298	2006 US_{256}	—	October 28, 2006	Kitt Peak	Spacewatch	·	1.0 km	MPC · JPL
185299	2006 UT_{257}	—	October 28, 2006	Mount Lemmon	Mount Lemmon Survey	·	1.3 km	MPC · JPL
185300	2006 UD_{261}	—	October 28, 2006	Socorro	LINEAR	·	7.1 km	MPC · JPL

== 185301–185400 ==
back to top

Designation			Discovery			Properties		Ref
Permanent	Provisional	Named after	Date	Site	Discoverer(s)	Category	Diam.	Ref
185301	2006 UY_{266}	—	October 27, 2006	Catalina	CSS	·	6.7 km	MPC · JPL
185302	2006 UK_{270}	—	October 27, 2006	Kitt Peak	Spacewatch	HOF	2.4 km	MPC · JPL
185303	2006 UB_{271}	—	October 27, 2006	Mount Lemmon	Mount Lemmon Survey	·	1.4 km	MPC · JPL
185304	2006 UG_{271}	—	October 27, 2006	Kitt Peak	Spacewatch	HOF	2.6 km	MPC · JPL
185305	2006 UA_{275}	—	October 28, 2006	Kitt Peak	Spacewatch	CLA	2.0 km	MPC · JPL
185306	2006 UP_{276}	—	October 28, 2006	Mount Lemmon	Mount Lemmon Survey	·	2.2 km	MPC · JPL
185307	2006 UA_{278}	—	October 28, 2006	Kitt Peak	Spacewatch	·	990 m	MPC · JPL
185308	2006 UR_{286}	—	October 28, 2006	Kitt Peak	Spacewatch	·	1.6 km	MPC · JPL
185309	2006 UN_{291}	—	October 27, 2006	Ottmarsheim	C. Rinner	·	2.1 km	MPC · JPL
185310	2006 UE_{321}	—	October 19, 2006	Kitt Peak	M. W. Buie	·	1.6 km	MPC · JPL
185311	2006 UO_{324}	—	October 19, 2006	Mount Lemmon	Mount Lemmon Survey	·	1.8 km	MPC · JPL
185312 Yvonnemarschall	2006 UV_{325}	Yvonnemarschall	October 20, 2006	Kitt Peak	M. W. Buie	·	1.7 km	MPC · JPL
185313	2006 UA_{328}	—	October 17, 2006	Kitt Peak	Spacewatch	V	840 m	MPC · JPL
185314	2006 UO_{328}	—	October 19, 2006	Catalina	CSS	·	1.2 km	MPC · JPL
185315	2006 UV_{328}	—	October 19, 2006	Mount Lemmon	Mount Lemmon Survey	·	2.1 km	MPC · JPL
185316	2006 UE_{329}	—	October 21, 2006	Kitt Peak	Spacewatch	KOR	1.5 km	MPC · JPL
185317	2006 UL_{329}	—	October 23, 2006	Catalina	CSS	·	3.6 km	MPC · JPL
185318	2006 UW_{330}	—	October 16, 2006	Apache Point	A. C. Becker	·	3.3 km	MPC · JPL
185319	2006 UG_{331}	—	October 16, 2006	Catalina	CSS	·	2.6 km	MPC · JPL
185320	2006 UH_{331}	—	October 16, 2006	Catalina	CSS	·	5.4 km	MPC · JPL
185321 Kammerlander	2006 VJ_{2}	Kammerlander	November 10, 2006	Vallemare di Borbona	V. S. Casulli	·	3.0 km	MPC · JPL
185322	2006 VF_{5}	—	November 10, 2006	Kitt Peak	Spacewatch	KOR	1.6 km	MPC · JPL
185323	2006 VD_{6}	—	November 10, 2006	Kitt Peak	Spacewatch	·	5.9 km	MPC · JPL
185324	2006 VE_{11}	—	November 11, 2006	Mount Lemmon	Mount Lemmon Survey	HOF	3.1 km	MPC · JPL
185325 Anupabhagwat	2006 VE_{14}	Anupabhagwat	November 14, 2006	Vallemare di Borbona	V. S. Casulli	EOS ·	4.7 km	MPC · JPL
185326	2006 VC_{17}	—	November 9, 2006	Kitt Peak	Spacewatch	·	1.7 km	MPC · JPL
185327	2006 VP_{21}	—	November 10, 2006	Kitt Peak	Spacewatch	·	2.7 km	MPC · JPL
185328	2006 VS_{25}	—	November 10, 2006	Kitt Peak	Spacewatch	·	2.4 km	MPC · JPL
185329	2006 VK_{26}	—	November 10, 2006	Kitt Peak	Spacewatch	·	2.9 km	MPC · JPL
185330	2006 VU_{26}	—	November 10, 2006	Kitt Peak	Spacewatch	KOR	1.8 km	MPC · JPL
185331	2006 VG_{31}	—	November 10, 2006	Kitt Peak	Spacewatch	·	2.3 km	MPC · JPL
185332	2006 VO_{32}	—	November 11, 2006	Mount Lemmon	Mount Lemmon Survey	·	1.6 km	MPC · JPL
185333	2006 VG_{34}	—	November 11, 2006	Catalina	CSS	·	2.1 km	MPC · JPL
185334	2006 VU_{34}	—	November 11, 2006	Catalina	CSS	·	1.9 km	MPC · JPL
185335	2006 VO_{35}	—	November 11, 2006	Mount Lemmon	Mount Lemmon Survey	·	790 m	MPC · JPL
185336	2006 VR_{35}	—	November 11, 2006	Mount Lemmon	Mount Lemmon Survey	·	1.0 km	MPC · JPL
185337	2006 VH_{37}	—	November 11, 2006	Catalina	CSS	·	1.1 km	MPC · JPL
185338	2006 VQ_{37}	—	November 11, 2006	Catalina	CSS	(5)	1.7 km	MPC · JPL
185339	2006 VR_{37}	—	November 11, 2006	Catalina	CSS	·	2.3 km	MPC · JPL
185340	2006 VT_{37}	—	November 11, 2006	Palomar	NEAT	·	3.0 km	MPC · JPL
185341	2006 VB_{38}	—	November 12, 2006	Catalina	CSS	·	1.1 km	MPC · JPL
185342	2006 VF_{44}	—	November 13, 2006	Catalina	CSS	·	1.7 km	MPC · JPL
185343	2006 VK_{46}	—	November 9, 2006	Kitt Peak	Spacewatch	·	3.6 km	MPC · JPL
185344	2006 VS_{48}	—	November 10, 2006	Kitt Peak	Spacewatch	·	1.1 km	MPC · JPL
185345	2006 VW_{53}	—	November 11, 2006	Kitt Peak	Spacewatch	·	3.7 km	MPC · JPL
185346	2006 VH_{54}	—	November 11, 2006	Kitt Peak	Spacewatch	·	3.1 km	MPC · JPL
185347	2006 VW_{55}	—	November 11, 2006	Kitt Peak	Spacewatch	·	1.3 km	MPC · JPL
185348	2006 VM_{57}	—	November 11, 2006	Kitt Peak	Spacewatch	KOR	1.7 km	MPC · JPL
185349	2006 VW_{57}	—	November 11, 2006	Kitt Peak	Spacewatch	·	2.0 km	MPC · JPL
185350	2006 VQ_{61}	—	November 11, 2006	Kitt Peak	Spacewatch	·	2.1 km	MPC · JPL
185351	2006 VV_{68}	—	November 11, 2006	Kitt Peak	Spacewatch	·	2.6 km	MPC · JPL
185352	2006 VJ_{70}	—	November 11, 2006	Kitt Peak	Spacewatch	·	1.0 km	MPC · JPL
185353	2006 VZ_{71}	—	November 11, 2006	Mount Lemmon	Mount Lemmon Survey	·	2.5 km	MPC · JPL
185354	2006 VC_{74}	—	November 11, 2006	Kitt Peak	Spacewatch	·	2.4 km	MPC · JPL
185355	2006 VK_{74}	—	November 11, 2006	Kitt Peak	Spacewatch	·	2.5 km	MPC · JPL
185356	2006 VW_{75}	—	November 11, 2006	Kitt Peak	Spacewatch	·	920 m	MPC · JPL
185357	2006 VP_{78}	—	November 12, 2006	Mount Lemmon	Mount Lemmon Survey	·	4.7 km	MPC · JPL
185358	2006 VB_{83}	—	November 13, 2006	Kitt Peak	Spacewatch	NYS	1.5 km	MPC · JPL
185359	2006 VG_{85}	—	November 13, 2006	Kitt Peak	Spacewatch	·	3.0 km	MPC · JPL
185360	2006 VZ_{88}	—	November 14, 2006	Goodricke-Pigott	R. A. Tucker	·	2.1 km	MPC · JPL
185361	2006 VX_{94}	—	November 15, 2006	Kitt Peak	Spacewatch	·	2.3 km	MPC · JPL
185362	2006 VG_{96}	—	November 10, 2006	Kitt Peak	Spacewatch	·	2.0 km	MPC · JPL
185363	2006 VK_{96}	—	November 10, 2006	Kitt Peak	Spacewatch	·	1.5 km	MPC · JPL
185364 Sunweihsin	2006 VQ_{103}	Sunweihsin	November 12, 2006	Lulin Observatory	Lin, H.-C., Q. Ye	·	1.8 km	MPC · JPL
185365	2006 VW_{107}	—	November 13, 2006	Kitt Peak	Spacewatch	(5)	1.9 km	MPC · JPL
185366	2006 VM_{110}	—	November 13, 2006	Kitt Peak	Spacewatch	·	3.2 km	MPC · JPL
185367	2006 VW_{114}	—	November 14, 2006	Mount Lemmon	Mount Lemmon Survey	(5)	2.0 km	MPC · JPL
185368	2006 VL_{116}	—	November 14, 2006	Socorro	LINEAR	NYS	1.1 km	MPC · JPL
185369	2006 VJ_{117}	—	November 14, 2006	Kitt Peak	Spacewatch	KOR	1.7 km	MPC · JPL
185370	2006 VJ_{120}	—	November 14, 2006	Mount Lemmon	Mount Lemmon Survey	V	1.0 km	MPC · JPL
185371	2006 VA_{121}	—	November 14, 2006	Kitt Peak	Spacewatch	THM	2.5 km	MPC · JPL
185372	2006 VG_{129}	—	November 15, 2006	Socorro	LINEAR	·	7.0 km	MPC · JPL
185373	2006 VM_{129}	—	November 15, 2006	Socorro	LINEAR	EOS	3.5 km	MPC · JPL
185374	2006 VP_{129}	—	November 15, 2006	Socorro	LINEAR	·	1.3 km	MPC · JPL
185375	2006 VY_{130}	—	November 15, 2006	Catalina	CSS	DOR	2.4 km	MPC · JPL
185376	2006 VS_{135}	—	November 15, 2006	Kitt Peak	Spacewatch	MAS	980 m	MPC · JPL
185377	2006 VH_{137}	—	November 15, 2006	Kitt Peak	Spacewatch	·	3.3 km	MPC · JPL
185378	2006 VS_{138}	—	November 15, 2006	Kitt Peak	Spacewatch	·	3.2 km	MPC · JPL
185379	2006 VF_{139}	—	November 15, 2006	Kitt Peak	Spacewatch	THM	4.0 km	MPC · JPL
185380	2006 VW_{142}	—	November 14, 2006	Socorro	LINEAR	(1547)	1.9 km	MPC · JPL
185381	2006 VC_{143}	—	November 14, 2006	Socorro	LINEAR	·	2.2 km	MPC · JPL
185382	2006 VY_{154}	—	November 8, 2006	Palomar	NEAT	PAD	2.4 km	MPC · JPL
185383	2006 WE_{2}	—	November 18, 2006	7300 Observatory	W. K. Y. Yeung	·	3.4 km	MPC · JPL
185384	2006 WL_{6}	—	November 16, 2006	Kitt Peak	Spacewatch	·	2.6 km	MPC · JPL
185385	2006 WR_{7}	—	November 16, 2006	Kitt Peak	Spacewatch	HOF	3.0 km	MPC · JPL
185386	2006 WA_{13}	—	November 16, 2006	Mount Lemmon	Mount Lemmon Survey	·	1.5 km	MPC · JPL
185387	2006 WK_{24}	—	November 17, 2006	Mount Lemmon	Mount Lemmon Survey	·	3.3 km	MPC · JPL
185388	2006 WX_{37}	—	November 16, 2006	Kitt Peak	Spacewatch	V	760 m	MPC · JPL
185389	2006 WJ_{42}	—	November 16, 2006	Mount Lemmon	Mount Lemmon Survey	·	3.5 km	MPC · JPL
185390	2006 WG_{46}	—	November 16, 2006	Kitt Peak	Spacewatch	·	2.8 km	MPC · JPL
185391	2006 WR_{46}	—	November 16, 2006	Kitt Peak	Spacewatch	·	2.6 km	MPC · JPL
185392	2006 WP_{55}	—	November 16, 2006	Kitt Peak	Spacewatch	·	2.0 km	MPC · JPL
185393	2006 WA_{58}	—	November 17, 2006	Kitt Peak	Spacewatch	·	1.7 km	MPC · JPL
185394	2006 WU_{60}	—	November 17, 2006	Catalina	CSS	·	3.8 km	MPC · JPL
185395	2006 WZ_{70}	—	November 18, 2006	Kitt Peak	Spacewatch	·	1.5 km	MPC · JPL
185396	2006 WX_{79}	—	November 18, 2006	Kitt Peak	Spacewatch	KOR	1.6 km	MPC · JPL
185397	2006 WN_{85}	—	November 18, 2006	Kitt Peak	Spacewatch	·	2.4 km	MPC · JPL
185398	2006 WF_{92}	—	November 19, 2006	Kitt Peak	Spacewatch	MAS	1.2 km	MPC · JPL
185399	2006 WL_{92}	—	November 19, 2006	Kitt Peak	Spacewatch	·	3.5 km	MPC · JPL
185400	2006 WK_{94}	—	November 19, 2006	Kitt Peak	Spacewatch	KOR	1.7 km	MPC · JPL

== 185401–185500 ==
back to top

Designation			Discovery			Properties		Ref
Permanent	Provisional	Named after	Date	Site	Discoverer(s)	Category	Diam.	Ref
185401	2006 WG_{96}	—	November 19, 2006	Catalina	CSS	·	1.6 km	MPC · JPL
185402	2006 WW_{108}	—	November 19, 2006	Kitt Peak	Spacewatch	·	2.1 km	MPC · JPL
185403	2006 WV_{117}	—	November 20, 2006	Mount Lemmon	Mount Lemmon Survey	·	1.6 km	MPC · JPL
185404	2006 WJ_{120}	—	November 21, 2006	Socorro	LINEAR	·	2.5 km	MPC · JPL
185405	2006 WQ_{128}	—	November 26, 2006	7300 Observatory	W. K. Y. Yeung	AST	3.3 km	MPC · JPL
185406	2006 WJ_{129}	—	November 26, 2006	7300 Observatory	W. K. Y. Yeung	THM	3.9 km	MPC · JPL
185407	2006 WN_{129}	—	November 23, 2006	Goodricke-Pigott	R. A. Tucker	·	1.3 km	MPC · JPL
185408	2006 WT_{131}	—	November 17, 2006	Mount Lemmon	Mount Lemmon Survey	·	1.9 km	MPC · JPL
185409	2006 WY_{140}	—	November 20, 2006	Kitt Peak	Spacewatch	·	2.9 km	MPC · JPL
185410	2006 WD_{147}	—	November 20, 2006	Kitt Peak	Spacewatch	KOR	2.0 km	MPC · JPL
185411	2006 WY_{158}	—	November 22, 2006	Socorro	LINEAR	·	1.2 km	MPC · JPL
185412	2006 WN_{161}	—	November 23, 2006	Kitt Peak	Spacewatch	HOF	3.8 km	MPC · JPL
185413	2006 WP_{163}	—	November 23, 2006	Kitt Peak	Spacewatch	(5)	1.5 km	MPC · JPL
185414	2006 WS_{163}	—	November 23, 2006	Kitt Peak	Spacewatch	·	2.1 km	MPC · JPL
185415	2006 WL_{171}	—	November 23, 2006	Kitt Peak	Spacewatch	·	1.6 km	MPC · JPL
185416	2006 WU_{171}	—	November 23, 2006	Kitt Peak	Spacewatch	AGN	1.5 km	MPC · JPL
185417	2006 WJ_{172}	—	November 23, 2006	Kitt Peak	Spacewatch	·	1.9 km	MPC · JPL
185418	2006 WH_{182}	—	November 24, 2006	Mount Lemmon	Mount Lemmon Survey	·	1.7 km	MPC · JPL
185419	2006 WU_{185}	—	November 17, 2006	Palomar	NEAT	·	2.0 km	MPC · JPL
185420	2006 WC_{191}	—	November 27, 2006	Kitt Peak	Spacewatch	·	1.5 km	MPC · JPL
185421	2006 WL_{191}	—	November 27, 2006	Kitt Peak	Spacewatch	·	2.1 km	MPC · JPL
185422	2006 WS_{192}	—	November 27, 2006	Kitt Peak	Spacewatch	·	2.2 km	MPC · JPL
185423	2006 XM	—	December 10, 2006	RAS	Lowe, A.	EUN	2.2 km	MPC · JPL
185424	2006 XJ_{5}	—	December 2, 2006	Socorro	LINEAR	·	3.4 km	MPC · JPL
185425	2006 XR_{7}	—	December 9, 2006	Kitt Peak	Spacewatch	(5)	1.8 km	MPC · JPL
185426	2006 XW_{7}	—	December 9, 2006	Palomar	NEAT	·	1.8 km	MPC · JPL
185427	2006 XX_{7}	—	December 9, 2006	Palomar	NEAT	EOS	2.8 km	MPC · JPL
185428	2006 XX_{10}	—	December 9, 2006	Kitt Peak	Spacewatch	·	7.2 km	MPC · JPL
185429	2006 XS_{16}	—	December 10, 2006	Kitt Peak	Spacewatch	·	2.1 km	MPC · JPL
185430	2006 XE_{22}	—	December 12, 2006	Kitt Peak	Spacewatch	·	3.1 km	MPC · JPL
185431	2006 XX_{25}	—	December 12, 2006	Catalina	CSS	(5)	2.1 km	MPC · JPL
185432	2006 XO_{26}	—	December 12, 2006	Catalina	CSS	EOS	5.7 km	MPC · JPL
185433	2006 XJ_{27}	—	December 13, 2006	Kitt Peak	Spacewatch	·	1.6 km	MPC · JPL
185434	2006 XK_{31}	—	December 13, 2006	Eskridge	Farpoint	·	2.4 km	MPC · JPL
185435	2006 XC_{33}	—	December 11, 2006	Kitt Peak	Spacewatch	·	1.9 km	MPC · JPL
185436	2006 XG_{38}	—	December 11, 2006	Kitt Peak	Spacewatch	·	4.5 km	MPC · JPL
185437	2006 XB_{47}	—	December 13, 2006	Mount Lemmon	Mount Lemmon Survey	·	2.2 km	MPC · JPL
185438	2006 XW_{47}	—	December 13, 2006	Kitt Peak	Spacewatch	·	3.2 km	MPC · JPL
185439	2006 XR_{49}	—	December 13, 2006	Mount Lemmon	Mount Lemmon Survey	AGN	2.0 km	MPC · JPL
185440	2006 XK_{52}	—	December 14, 2006	Socorro	LINEAR	·	5.8 km	MPC · JPL
185441	2006 XE_{54}	—	December 15, 2006	Socorro	LINEAR	·	2.5 km	MPC · JPL
185442	2006 XQ_{54}	—	December 15, 2006	Socorro	LINEAR	(5)	1.9 km	MPC · JPL
185443	2006 XG_{57}	—	December 14, 2006	Catalina	CSS	·	3.8 km	MPC · JPL
185444	2006 XB_{59}	—	December 14, 2006	Kitt Peak	Spacewatch	HOF	3.7 km	MPC · JPL
185445	2006 YA_{2}	—	December 17, 2006	7300 Observatory	W. K. Y. Yeung	·	6.6 km	MPC · JPL
185446	2006 YN_{6}	—	December 17, 2006	Mount Lemmon	Mount Lemmon Survey	(12739)	2.1 km	MPC · JPL
185447	2006 YT_{11}	—	December 18, 2006	Nyukasa	Japan Aerospace Exploration Agency	MAS	1.2 km	MPC · JPL
185448 Nomentum	2006 YK_{13}	Nomentum	December 25, 2006	Vallemare di Borbona	V. S. Casulli	EOS	3.9 km	MPC · JPL
185449	2006 YG_{26}	—	December 21, 2006	Kitt Peak	Spacewatch	·	2.2 km	MPC · JPL
185450	2006 YG_{30}	—	December 21, 2006	Kitt Peak	Spacewatch	EOS	3.0 km	MPC · JPL
185451	2006 YS_{30}	—	December 21, 2006	Kitt Peak	Spacewatch	KOR	1.7 km	MPC · JPL
185452	2006 YZ_{39}	—	December 22, 2006	Kitt Peak	Spacewatch	KOR	1.6 km	MPC · JPL
185453	2006 YK_{41}	—	December 22, 2006	Kitt Peak	Spacewatch	·	1.5 km	MPC · JPL
185454	2006 YW_{45}	—	December 21, 2006	Catalina	CSS	THM	2.5 km	MPC · JPL
185455	2006 YX_{46}	—	December 22, 2006	Kitt Peak	Spacewatch	·	2.9 km	MPC · JPL
185456	2007 AT	—	January 8, 2007	Mount Lemmon	Mount Lemmon Survey	KOR	1.8 km	MPC · JPL
185457	2007 AN_{2}	—	January 8, 2007	Socorro	LINEAR	·	3.6 km	MPC · JPL
185458	2007 AO_{6}	—	January 8, 2007	Kitt Peak	Spacewatch	·	5.1 km	MPC · JPL
185459	2007 AD_{8}	—	January 9, 2007	Mount Lemmon	Mount Lemmon Survey	·	5.3 km	MPC · JPL
185460	2007 AG_{14}	—	January 9, 2007	Mount Lemmon	Mount Lemmon Survey	·	4.9 km	MPC · JPL
185461	2007 BK_{1}	—	January 16, 2007	Catalina	CSS	·	4.4 km	MPC · JPL
185462	2007 BH_{4}	—	January 16, 2007	Catalina	CSS	EOS	3.0 km	MPC · JPL
185463	2007 BQ_{4}	—	January 16, 2007	Catalina	CSS	EUP	6.7 km	MPC · JPL
185464	2007 BS_{5}	—	January 17, 2007	Catalina	CSS	CYB	9.0 km	MPC · JPL
185465	2007 BC_{18}	—	January 17, 2007	Palomar	NEAT	·	2.3 km	MPC · JPL
185466	2007 BT_{35}	—	January 24, 2007	Mount Lemmon	Mount Lemmon Survey	·	2.7 km	MPC · JPL
185467	2007 BN_{37}	—	January 24, 2007	Mount Lemmon	Mount Lemmon Survey	·	2.6 km	MPC · JPL
185468	2007 BR_{42}	—	January 24, 2007	Catalina	CSS	·	5.9 km	MPC · JPL
185469	2007 BQ_{45}	—	January 25, 2007	Kitt Peak	Spacewatch	·	3.4 km	MPC · JPL
185470	2007 BT_{45}	—	January 25, 2007	Socorro	LINEAR	·	4.1 km	MPC · JPL
185471	2007 BV_{45}	—	January 26, 2007	Kitt Peak	Spacewatch	EOS	3.2 km	MPC · JPL
185472	2007 BZ_{62}	—	January 27, 2007	Mount Lemmon	Mount Lemmon Survey	KOR	1.8 km	MPC · JPL
185473	2007 BE_{67}	—	January 27, 2007	Mount Lemmon	Mount Lemmon Survey	·	3.2 km	MPC · JPL
185474	2007 BR_{74}	—	January 17, 2007	Kitt Peak	Spacewatch	·	4.3 km	MPC · JPL
185475	2007 BA_{75}	—	January 27, 2007	Kitt Peak	Spacewatch	·	2.8 km	MPC · JPL
185476	2007 CL_{4}	—	February 6, 2007	Mount Lemmon	Mount Lemmon Survey	·	2.8 km	MPC · JPL
185477	2007 CK_{6}	—	February 6, 2007	Kitt Peak	Spacewatch	·	1.3 km	MPC · JPL
185478	2007 CD_{7}	—	February 6, 2007	Palomar	NEAT	EMA	6.4 km	MPC · JPL
185479	2007 CN_{10}	—	February 6, 2007	Mount Lemmon	Mount Lemmon Survey	·	1.6 km	MPC · JPL
185480	2007 CX_{27}	—	February 6, 2007	Kitt Peak	Spacewatch	EOS	3.1 km	MPC · JPL
185481	2007 CF_{34}	—	February 6, 2007	Mount Lemmon	Mount Lemmon Survey	AGN	1.6 km	MPC · JPL
185482	2007 CK_{38}	—	February 6, 2007	Mount Lemmon	Mount Lemmon Survey	HYG	4.0 km	MPC · JPL
185483	2007 DX_{5}	—	February 17, 2007	Kitt Peak	Spacewatch	·	7.0 km	MPC · JPL
185484 Czochralski	2007 DB_{85}	Czochralski	February 22, 2007	Antares	Astronomical Research Observatory	SYL · CYB	5.9 km	MPC · JPL
185485	2007 EL_{68}	—	March 10, 2007	Kitt Peak	Spacewatch	L5	10 km	MPC · JPL
185486	2007 EP_{75}	—	March 10, 2007	Kitt Peak	Spacewatch	L5	12 km	MPC · JPL
185487	2007 ED_{139}	—	March 12, 2007	Kitt Peak	Spacewatch	L5	10 km	MPC · JPL
185488	2007 EF_{159}	—	March 14, 2007	Mount Lemmon	Mount Lemmon Survey	KOR	1.9 km	MPC · JPL
185489	2007 FK_{33}	—	March 25, 2007	Mount Lemmon	Mount Lemmon Survey	L5	9.6 km	MPC · JPL
185490	2007 GR_{1}	—	April 9, 2007	Bergen-Enkheim	Bergen-Enkheim	L5	16 km	MPC · JPL
185491	2007 GP_{3}	—	April 9, 2007	Kitt Peak	Spacewatch	MAS	910 m	MPC · JPL
185492	2007 HA_{8}	—	April 18, 2007	Anderson Mesa	LONEOS	L5 · slow	12 km	MPC · JPL
185493	2007 PO_{42}	—	August 13, 2007	Socorro	LINEAR	·	1.3 km	MPC · JPL
185494	2007 RB_{33}	—	September 5, 2007	Anderson Mesa	LONEOS	·	2.8 km	MPC · JPL
185495	2007 RV_{141}	—	September 13, 2007	Socorro	LINEAR	MAS	1.1 km	MPC · JPL
185496	2007 RR_{241}	—	September 13, 2007	Socorro	LINEAR	THM	3.3 km	MPC · JPL
185497	2007 RJ_{260}	—	September 14, 2007	Mount Lemmon	Mount Lemmon Survey	NYS	1.3 km	MPC · JPL
185498 Majorcastroinst	2007 SN	Majorcastroinst	September 17, 2007	OAM	OAM	·	2.5 km	MPC · JPL
185499	2007 TV_{40}	—	October 6, 2007	Kitt Peak	Spacewatch	KOR	1.9 km	MPC · JPL
185500	2007 TA_{54}	—	October 4, 2007	Kitt Peak	Spacewatch	AST	3.8 km	MPC · JPL

== 185501–185600 ==
back to top

Designation			Discovery			Properties		Ref
Permanent	Provisional	Named after	Date	Site	Discoverer(s)	Category	Diam.	Ref
185501	2007 TR_{57}	—	October 4, 2007	Kitt Peak	Spacewatch	·	2.4 km	MPC · JPL
185502	2007 TF_{126}	—	October 6, 2007	Kitt Peak	Spacewatch	THM	4.4 km	MPC · JPL
185503	2007 TK_{165}	—	October 11, 2007	Socorro	LINEAR	·	2.9 km	MPC · JPL
185504	2007 TQ_{230}	—	October 8, 2007	Kitt Peak	Spacewatch	·	2.8 km	MPC · JPL
185505	2007 TU_{251}	—	October 12, 2007	Anderson Mesa	LONEOS	·	3.6 km	MPC · JPL
185506	2007 TJ_{315}	—	October 12, 2007	Kitt Peak	Spacewatch	·	2.8 km	MPC · JPL
185507	2007 TE_{335}	—	October 11, 2007	Kitt Peak	Spacewatch	MAS	770 m	MPC · JPL
185508	2007 TO_{335}	—	October 11, 2007	Kitt Peak	Spacewatch	·	2.7 km	MPC · JPL
185509	2007 TJ_{361}	—	October 14, 2007	Mount Lemmon	Mount Lemmon Survey	·	2.7 km	MPC · JPL
185510	2007 TA_{364}	—	October 14, 2007	Mount Lemmon	Mount Lemmon Survey	·	2.8 km	MPC · JPL
185511	2007 TR_{414}	—	October 15, 2007	Lulin Observatory	LUSS	·	2.5 km	MPC · JPL
185512	2007 UL	—	October 16, 2007	RAS	Lowe, A.	·	1.3 km	MPC · JPL
185513	2007 UY_{46}	—	October 20, 2007	Catalina	CSS	·	3.2 km	MPC · JPL
185514	2007 UE_{79}	—	October 30, 2007	Mount Lemmon	Mount Lemmon Survey	·	1.8 km	MPC · JPL
185515	2007 UW_{104}	—	October 30, 2007	Kitt Peak	Spacewatch	·	1.7 km	MPC · JPL
185516	2007 UB_{116}	—	October 31, 2007	Kitt Peak	Spacewatch	·	1.1 km	MPC · JPL
185517	2007 VQ_{28}	—	November 2, 2007	Kitt Peak	Spacewatch	·	4.2 km	MPC · JPL
185518	2007 VG_{51}	—	November 1, 2007	Kitt Peak	Spacewatch	GEF	2.1 km	MPC · JPL
185519	2007 VT_{63}	—	November 1, 2007	Kitt Peak	Spacewatch	·	1.9 km	MPC · JPL
185520	2007 VM_{65}	—	November 1, 2007	Kitt Peak	Spacewatch	·	2.3 km	MPC · JPL
185521	2007 VA_{67}	—	November 2, 2007	Kitt Peak	Spacewatch	·	3.0 km	MPC · JPL
185522	2007 VH_{75}	—	November 3, 2007	Kitt Peak	Spacewatch	·	1.9 km	MPC · JPL
185523	2007 VZ_{145}	—	November 4, 2007	Kitt Peak	Spacewatch	·	1.8 km	MPC · JPL
185524	2007 VK_{162}	—	November 5, 2007	Kitt Peak	Spacewatch	·	2.3 km	MPC · JPL
185525	2007 VJ_{164}	—	November 5, 2007	Mount Lemmon	Mount Lemmon Survey	MAS	1.0 km	MPC · JPL
185526	2007 VT_{190}	—	November 8, 2007	Kitt Peak	Spacewatch	·	3.7 km	MPC · JPL
185527	2007 VE_{238}	—	November 13, 2007	Anderson Mesa	LONEOS	·	1.6 km	MPC · JPL
185528	2007 VR_{243}	—	November 11, 2007	OAM	OAM	·	4.2 km	MPC · JPL
185529	2007 WE_{12}	—	November 17, 2007	Catalina	CSS	VER	4.7 km	MPC · JPL
185530	2007 WT_{12}	—	November 17, 2007	Kitt Peak	Spacewatch	EOS	3.0 km	MPC · JPL
185531	2007 WR_{23}	—	November 18, 2007	Mount Lemmon	Mount Lemmon Survey	KOR	1.9 km	MPC · JPL
185532	2007 WR_{42}	—	November 18, 2007	Mount Lemmon	Mount Lemmon Survey	SYL · CYB	6.3 km	MPC · JPL
185533	2007 WG_{53}	—	November 17, 2007	Eskridge	Farpoint	AST	3.5 km	MPC · JPL
185534	2007 WP_{54}	—	November 19, 2007	Mount Lemmon	Mount Lemmon Survey	·	4.3 km	MPC · JPL
185535 Gangda	2007 WH_{56}	Gangda	November 28, 2007	Purple Mountain	PMO NEO Survey Program	(5)	4.5 km	MPC · JPL
185536	2007 XS_{3}	—	December 3, 2007	Catalina	CSS	KOR	2.3 km	MPC · JPL
185537	2007 XK_{12}	—	December 4, 2007	Kitt Peak	Spacewatch	·	2.3 km	MPC · JPL
185538 Fangcheng	2007 XD_{28}	Fangcheng	December 14, 2007	Purple Mountain	PMO NEO Survey Program	·	2.6 km	MPC · JPL
185539	2007 XS_{28}	—	December 15, 2007	Kitt Peak	Spacewatch	(17392)	1.9 km	MPC · JPL
185540	2007 XQ_{32}	—	December 15, 2007	Kitt Peak	Spacewatch	AGN	1.9 km	MPC · JPL
185541	2007 XE_{33}	—	December 15, 2007	Kitt Peak	Spacewatch	·	2.8 km	MPC · JPL
185542	2007 XM_{39}	—	December 13, 2007	Socorro	LINEAR	·	1.9 km	MPC · JPL
185543	2007 XY_{39}	—	December 13, 2007	Socorro	LINEAR	·	2.2 km	MPC · JPL
185544	2007 YN_{28}	—	December 18, 2007	Mount Lemmon	Mount Lemmon Survey	H	1.0 km	MPC · JPL
185545	2007 YH_{31}	—	December 28, 2007	Kitt Peak	Spacewatch	(12739)	2.4 km	MPC · JPL
185546 Yushan	2007 YU_{31}	Yushan	December 28, 2007	Lulin Observatory	Q. Ye, Lin, C. S.	MAS	850 m	MPC · JPL
185547	2007 YS_{33}	—	December 28, 2007	Kitt Peak	Spacewatch	·	4.0 km	MPC · JPL
185548	2007 YG_{45}	—	December 30, 2007	Mount Lemmon	Mount Lemmon Survey	·	1.2 km	MPC · JPL
185549	2007 YX_{52}	—	December 30, 2007	Catalina	CSS	·	1.4 km	MPC · JPL
185550	2007 YP_{57}	—	December 28, 2007	Kitt Peak	Spacewatch	·	3.4 km	MPC · JPL
185551	2007 YT_{58}	—	December 30, 2007	Catalina	CSS	·	1.0 km	MPC · JPL
185552	2007 YY_{58}	—	December 31, 2007	Catalina	CSS	·	2.9 km	MPC · JPL
185553	2008 AX_{4}	—	January 7, 2008	Lulin Observatory	LUSS	MAS	760 m	MPC · JPL
185554 Bikushev	2008 AB_{5}	Bikushev	January 7, 2008	Lulin Observatory	Q. Ye	TEL	2.1 km	MPC · JPL
185555	2008 AP_{8}	—	January 10, 2008	Kitt Peak	Spacewatch	NYS	1.1 km	MPC · JPL
185556	2008 AY_{8}	—	January 10, 2008	Kitt Peak	Spacewatch	KOR	2.0 km	MPC · JPL
185557	2008 AF_{16}	—	January 10, 2008	Mount Lemmon	Mount Lemmon Survey	V	870 m	MPC · JPL
185558	2008 AG_{19}	—	January 10, 2008	Mount Lemmon	Mount Lemmon Survey	·	4.1 km	MPC · JPL
185559	2008 AO_{22}	—	January 10, 2008	Mount Lemmon	Mount Lemmon Survey	·	1.5 km	MPC · JPL
185560 Harrykroto	2008 AQ_{31}	Harrykroto	January 7, 2008	OAM	OAM	·	1.0 km	MPC · JPL
185561 Miquelsiquier	2008 AV_{31}	Miquelsiquier	January 12, 2008	OAM	OAM	·	3.8 km	MPC · JPL
185562	2008 AU_{32}	—	January 13, 2008	Mallorca	OAM	·	1.4 km	MPC · JPL
185563	2008 AL_{34}	—	January 10, 2008	Kitt Peak	Spacewatch	·	1.0 km	MPC · JPL
185564	2008 AO_{42}	—	January 10, 2008	Catalina	CSS	·	1.7 km	MPC · JPL
185565	2008 AR_{42}	—	January 10, 2008	Catalina	CSS	·	4.9 km	MPC · JPL
185566	2008 AY_{43}	—	January 10, 2008	Kitt Peak	Spacewatch	·	1.2 km	MPC · JPL
185567	2008 AQ_{59}	—	January 11, 2008	Kitt Peak	Spacewatch	·	1.2 km	MPC · JPL
185568	2008 AE_{71}	—	January 12, 2008	Kitt Peak	Spacewatch	MAS	1.1 km	MPC · JPL
185569	2008 AS_{77}	—	January 12, 2008	Kitt Peak	Spacewatch	·	2.7 km	MPC · JPL
185570	2008 AA_{78}	—	January 12, 2008	Kitt Peak	Spacewatch	·	3.6 km	MPC · JPL
185571	2008 AT_{98}	—	January 14, 2008	Kitt Peak	Spacewatch	NYS	1.5 km	MPC · JPL
185572	2008 AP_{103}	—	January 15, 2008	Mount Lemmon	Mount Lemmon Survey	·	2.2 km	MPC · JPL
185573	2008 AE_{106}	—	January 15, 2008	Mount Lemmon	Mount Lemmon Survey	·	1.3 km	MPC · JPL
185574	2008 BV_{4}	—	January 16, 2008	Kitt Peak	Spacewatch	·	1.5 km	MPC · JPL
185575	2008 BF_{15}	—	January 29, 2008	Junk Bond	D. Healy	·	2.4 km	MPC · JPL
185576 Covichi	2008 BL_{15}	Covichi	January 26, 2008	La Cañada	Lacruz, J.	MAS	970 m	MPC · JPL
185577 Hhaihao	2008 BA_{16}	Hhaihao	January 28, 2008	Lulin Observatory	Q. Ye, Lin, H.-C.	·	1.8 km	MPC · JPL
185578 Agustínelcasta	2008 BJ_{16}	Agustínelcasta	January 28, 2008	OAM	OAM	·	1.7 km	MPC · JPL
185579 Jorgejuan	2008 BS_{16}	Jorgejuan	January 29, 2008	OAM	OAM	V	930 m	MPC · JPL
185580 Andratx	2008 BV_{18}	Andratx	January 29, 2008	OAM	OAM	·	1.6 km	MPC · JPL
185581	2008 BM_{20}	—	January 30, 2008	Catalina	CSS	·	1.3 km	MPC · JPL
185582	2008 BZ_{20}	—	January 30, 2008	Mount Lemmon	Mount Lemmon Survey	·	2.7 km	MPC · JPL
185583	2008 BG_{22}	—	January 31, 2008	Mount Lemmon	Mount Lemmon Survey	MAS	1.0 km	MPC · JPL
185584	2008 BW_{22}	—	January 31, 2008	Mount Lemmon	Mount Lemmon Survey	·	3.3 km	MPC · JPL
185585	2008 BF_{23}	—	January 31, 2008	Mount Lemmon	Mount Lemmon Survey	·	2.8 km	MPC · JPL
185586	2008 BJ_{24}	—	January 30, 2008	Kitt Peak	Spacewatch	NYS	1.3 km	MPC · JPL
185587	2008 BR_{24}	—	January 30, 2008	OAM	OAM	·	2.3 km	MPC · JPL
185588	2008 BH_{26}	—	January 30, 2008	Catalina	CSS	·	4.8 km	MPC · JPL
185589	2008 BS_{31}	—	January 30, 2008	Mount Lemmon	Mount Lemmon Survey	·	910 m	MPC · JPL
185590	2008 BJ_{33}	—	January 30, 2008	Kitt Peak	Spacewatch	·	1.8 km	MPC · JPL
185591	2008 BP_{35}	—	January 30, 2008	Kitt Peak	Spacewatch	·	2.3 km	MPC · JPL
185592	2008 BR_{35}	—	January 30, 2008	Kitt Peak	Spacewatch	·	4.8 km	MPC · JPL
185593	2008 BC_{41}	—	January 30, 2008	Catalina	CSS	·	3.9 km	MPC · JPL
185594	2008 BG_{42}	—	January 31, 2008	Catalina	CSS	·	3.4 km	MPC · JPL
185595	2008 CR_{2}	—	February 1, 2008	Mount Lemmon	Mount Lemmon Survey	·	2.5 km	MPC · JPL
185596	2008 CP_{3}	—	February 2, 2008	Kitt Peak	Spacewatch	NYS	1.5 km	MPC · JPL
185597	2008 CH_{4}	—	February 2, 2008	Kitt Peak	Spacewatch	·	840 m	MPC · JPL
185598	2008 CY_{5}	—	February 7, 2008	RAS	Lowe, A.	H	740 m	MPC · JPL
185599	2008 CJ_{7}	—	February 2, 2008	Kitt Peak	Spacewatch	HIL · 3:2	8.5 km	MPC · JPL
185600	2008 CT_{14}	—	February 3, 2008	Kitt Peak	Spacewatch	·	2.0 km	MPC · JPL

== 185601–185700 ==
back to top

Designation			Discovery			Properties		Ref
Permanent	Provisional	Named after	Date	Site	Discoverer(s)	Category	Diam.	Ref
185601	2008 CC_{16}	—	February 3, 2008	Mount Lemmon	Mount Lemmon Survey	·	2.2 km	MPC · JPL
185602	2008 CF_{23}	—	February 1, 2008	Kitt Peak	Spacewatch	·	860 m	MPC · JPL
185603	2008 CQ_{23}	—	February 1, 2008	Kitt Peak	Spacewatch	·	1.9 km	MPC · JPL
185604	2008 CX_{23}	—	February 1, 2008	Kitt Peak	Spacewatch	·	3.5 km	MPC · JPL
185605	2008 CW_{25}	—	February 1, 2008	Catalina	CSS	·	5.3 km	MPC · JPL
185606	2008 CH_{29}	—	February 2, 2008	Kitt Peak	Spacewatch	AGN	1.2 km	MPC · JPL
185607	2008 CK_{35}	—	February 2, 2008	Kitt Peak	Spacewatch	·	2.2 km	MPC · JPL
185608	2008 CA_{38}	—	February 2, 2008	Kitt Peak	Spacewatch	·	4.5 km	MPC · JPL
185609	2008 CT_{42}	—	February 2, 2008	Kitt Peak	Spacewatch	·	1.2 km	MPC · JPL
185610	2008 CZ_{44}	—	February 2, 2008	Kitt Peak	Spacewatch	·	2.0 km	MPC · JPL
185611	2008 CK_{46}	—	February 2, 2008	Kitt Peak	Spacewatch	·	3.1 km	MPC · JPL
185612	2008 CT_{49}	—	February 6, 2008	Catalina	CSS	·	5.5 km	MPC · JPL
185613	2008 CE_{50}	—	February 6, 2008	Catalina	CSS	·	4.4 km	MPC · JPL
185614	2008 CD_{61}	—	February 7, 2008	Mount Lemmon	Mount Lemmon Survey	·	2.6 km	MPC · JPL
185615	2008 CZ_{66}	—	February 8, 2008	Catalina	CSS	EUN	4.8 km	MPC · JPL
185616	2008 CC_{72}	—	February 9, 2008	Catalina	CSS	·	3.5 km	MPC · JPL
185617	2008 CS_{85}	—	February 7, 2008	Mount Lemmon	Mount Lemmon Survey	NYS	1.7 km	MPC · JPL
185618	2008 CR_{93}	—	February 8, 2008	Mount Lemmon	Mount Lemmon Survey	AGN	1.3 km	MPC · JPL
185619	2008 CH_{97}	—	February 9, 2008	Kitt Peak	Spacewatch	·	2.6 km	MPC · JPL
185620	2008 CL_{120}	—	February 6, 2008	Catalina	CSS	·	5.5 km	MPC · JPL
185621	2008 CA_{121}	—	February 6, 2008	Catalina	CSS	·	2.9 km	MPC · JPL
185622	2008 CH_{127}	—	February 8, 2008	Kitt Peak	Spacewatch	·	1.8 km	MPC · JPL
185623	2008 CJ_{135}	—	February 8, 2008	Mount Lemmon	Mount Lemmon Survey	·	1.2 km	MPC · JPL
185624	2008 CU_{163}	—	February 10, 2008	Catalina	CSS	·	4.0 km	MPC · JPL
185625	2008 CD_{167}	—	February 11, 2008	Mount Lemmon	Mount Lemmon Survey	·	4.0 km	MPC · JPL
185626	2008 CU_{175}	—	February 6, 2008	Socorro	LINEAR	EUN	2.5 km	MPC · JPL
185627	2008 CC_{178}	—	February 6, 2008	Catalina	CSS	·	5.0 km	MPC · JPL
185628	2008 CD_{179}	—	February 6, 2008	Catalina	CSS	DOR	5.7 km	MPC · JPL
185629	2008 CY_{180}	—	February 9, 2008	Catalina	CSS	JUN	1.4 km	MPC · JPL
185630	2008 CZ_{180}	—	February 9, 2008	Catalina	CSS	·	1.5 km	MPC · JPL
185631	2008 CZ_{181}	—	February 11, 2008	Mount Lemmon	Mount Lemmon Survey	V	1.1 km	MPC · JPL
185632	2008 CS_{183}	—	February 13, 2008	Catalina	CSS	·	6.4 km	MPC · JPL
185633 Rainbach	2008 DO	Rainbach	February 24, 2008	Gaisberg	Gierlinger, R.	·	1.7 km	MPC · JPL
185634	2008 DR_{11}	—	February 26, 2008	Anderson Mesa	LONEOS	·	1.1 km	MPC · JPL
185635	2008 DL_{27}	—	February 26, 2008	Socorro	LINEAR	·	2.4 km	MPC · JPL
185636 Shiao Lin	2008 DV_{40}	Shiao Lin	February 27, 2008	Lulin Observatory	Lin, C.-S., Q. Ye	EOS	2.6 km	MPC · JPL
185637	2008 DH_{54}	—	February 27, 2008	Catalina	CSS	·	4.4 km	MPC · JPL
185638 Erwinschwab	2008 EU_{7}	Erwinschwab	March 1, 2008	OAM	OAM	NYS	1.4 km	MPC · JPL
185639 Rainerkling	2008 EH_{8}	Rainerkling	March 2, 2008	OAM	OAM	·	840 m	MPC · JPL
185640 Sunyisui	2008 EB_{34}	Sunyisui	March 1, 2008	XuYi	PMO NEO Survey Program	HIL · 3:2	8.3 km	MPC · JPL
185641 Judd	2008 EH_{69}	Judd	March 5, 2008	Wrightwood	J. W. Young	·	2.0 km	MPC · JPL
185642	2008 EV_{88}	—	March 8, 2008	RAS	Lowe, A.	·	4.7 km	MPC · JPL
185643	2040 P-L	—	September 24, 1960	Palomar	C. J. van Houten, I. van Houten-Groeneveld, T. Gehrels	·	1.2 km	MPC · JPL
185644	4890 P-L	—	September 24, 1960	Palomar	C. J. van Houten, I. van Houten-Groeneveld, T. Gehrels	NYS	1.0 km	MPC · JPL
185645	6733 P-L	—	September 24, 1960	Palomar	C. J. van Houten, I. van Houten-Groeneveld, T. Gehrels	·	1.8 km	MPC · JPL
185646	3217 T-2	—	September 30, 1973	Palomar	C. J. van Houten, I. van Houten-Groeneveld, T. Gehrels	·	3.8 km	MPC · JPL
185647	4226 T-2	—	September 29, 1973	Palomar	C. J. van Houten, I. van Houten-Groeneveld, T. Gehrels	NYS	1.7 km	MPC · JPL
185648	1067 T-3	—	October 17, 1977	Palomar	C. J. van Houten, I. van Houten-Groeneveld, T. Gehrels	·	4.7 km	MPC · JPL
185649	1802 T-3	—	October 17, 1977	Palomar	C. J. van Houten, I. van Houten-Groeneveld, T. Gehrels	EUP	5.3 km	MPC · JPL
185650	2608 T-3	—	October 16, 1977	Palomar	C. J. van Houten, I. van Houten-Groeneveld, T. Gehrels	·	1.6 km	MPC · JPL
185651	3043 T-3	—	October 16, 1977	Palomar	C. J. van Houten, I. van Houten-Groeneveld, T. Gehrels	NYS	1.3 km	MPC · JPL
185652	3199 T-3	—	October 16, 1977	Palomar	C. J. van Houten, I. van Houten-Groeneveld, T. Gehrels	·	3.3 km	MPC · JPL
185653	3442 T-3	—	October 16, 1977	Palomar	C. J. van Houten, I. van Houten-Groeneveld, T. Gehrels	·	3.8 km	MPC · JPL
185654	3980 T-3	—	October 16, 1977	Palomar	C. J. van Houten, I. van Houten-Groeneveld, T. Gehrels	·	3.2 km	MPC · JPL
185655	4368 T-3	—	October 16, 1977	Palomar	C. J. van Houten, I. van Houten-Groeneveld, T. Gehrels	NYS	1.5 km	MPC · JPL
185656	1981 ET_{35}	—	March 2, 1981	Siding Spring	S. J. Bus	EOS	3.0 km	MPC · JPL
185657	1992 WL_{6}	—	November 19, 1992	Kitt Peak	Spacewatch	MAR	1.8 km	MPC · JPL
185658	1993 FG_{3}	—	March 24, 1993	Kitt Peak	Spacewatch	NYS	1.2 km	MPC · JPL
185659	1993 FT_{45}	—	March 19, 1993	La Silla	UESAC	·	3.6 km	MPC · JPL
185660	1993 RE_{4}	—	September 15, 1993	La Silla	E. W. Elst	·	4.3 km	MPC · JPL
185661	1993 TY_{23}	—	October 9, 1993	La Silla	E. W. Elst	·	1.7 km	MPC · JPL
185662	1994 AG_{13}	—	January 11, 1994	Kitt Peak	Spacewatch	·	4.1 km	MPC · JPL
185663	1994 EE	—	March 4, 1994	Stroncone	A. Vagnozzi	·	1.1 km	MPC · JPL
185664	1995 AW_{1}	—	January 7, 1995	Kitt Peak	Spacewatch	·	1.5 km	MPC · JPL
185665	1995 CS_{2}	—	February 1, 1995	Kitt Peak	Spacewatch	·	1.9 km	MPC · JPL
185666	1995 FT_{9}	—	March 26, 1995	Kitt Peak	Spacewatch	L5	14 km	MPC · JPL
185667	1995 FY_{11}	—	March 27, 1995	Kitt Peak	Spacewatch	·	2.1 km	MPC · JPL
185668	1995 MF_{4}	—	June 29, 1995	Kitt Peak	Spacewatch	·	820 m	MPC · JPL
185669	1995 MN_{6}	—	June 28, 1995	Kitt Peak	Spacewatch	·	3.2 km	MPC · JPL
185670	1995 RS	—	September 14, 1995	Haleakala	AMOS	·	1.1 km	MPC · JPL
185671	1995 SC_{20}	—	September 18, 1995	Kitt Peak	Spacewatch	MAS	950 m	MPC · JPL
185672	1995 SZ_{25}	—	September 19, 1995	Kitt Peak	Spacewatch	KOR	1.8 km	MPC · JPL
185673	1995 SD_{32}	—	September 21, 1995	Kitt Peak	Spacewatch	·	710 m	MPC · JPL
185674	1995 SM_{68}	—	September 20, 1995	Kitt Peak	Spacewatch	·	1.8 km	MPC · JPL
185675	1995 SN_{79}	—	September 21, 1995	Kitt Peak	Spacewatch	KOR	1.7 km	MPC · JPL
185676	1995 SN_{88}	—	September 26, 1995	Kitt Peak	Spacewatch	MAS	700 m	MPC · JPL
185677	1995 SB_{90}	—	September 18, 1995	Kitt Peak	Spacewatch	KOR	1.4 km	MPC · JPL
185678	1995 TN_{1}	—	October 14, 1995	Xinglong	SCAP	·	1.3 km	MPC · JPL
185679	1995 UK_{36}	—	October 21, 1995	Kitt Peak	Spacewatch	·	2.6 km	MPC · JPL
185680	1995 YC_{6}	—	December 16, 1995	Kitt Peak	Spacewatch	PHO	2.8 km	MPC · JPL
185681	1996 AB_{13}	—	January 15, 1996	Kitt Peak	Spacewatch	·	3.9 km	MPC · JPL
185682	1996 JR_{16}	—	May 11, 1996	Kitt Peak	Spacewatch	·	1.3 km	MPC · JPL
185683	1996 ML_{1}	—	June 16, 1996	Kitt Peak	Spacewatch	·	1.8 km	MPC · JPL
185684	1996 RX_{5}	—	September 5, 1996	Kitt Peak	Spacewatch	·	3.6 km	MPC · JPL
185685	1996 TP_{27}	—	October 7, 1996	Kitt Peak	Spacewatch	AGN	1.6 km	MPC · JPL
185686	1996 VY_{17}	—	November 6, 1996	Kitt Peak	Spacewatch	·	3.4 km	MPC · JPL
185687	1996 XP_{16}	—	December 4, 1996	Kitt Peak	Spacewatch	·	1.1 km	MPC · JPL
185688	1997 CC_{6}	—	February 6, 1997	Sormano	M. Cavagna, A. Testa	·	2.7 km	MPC · JPL
185689	1997 GR_{7}	—	April 2, 1997	Socorro	LINEAR	EUP	7.1 km	MPC · JPL
185690	1997 GB_{9}	—	April 3, 1997	Socorro	LINEAR	·	1.6 km	MPC · JPL
185691	1997 GT_{10}	—	April 3, 1997	Socorro	LINEAR	NYS	1.3 km	MPC · JPL
185692	1997 GY_{31}	—	April 15, 1997	Kitt Peak	Spacewatch	H	940 m	MPC · JPL
185693	1997 HV_{3}	—	April 30, 1997	Kitt Peak	Spacewatch	L5	10 km	MPC · JPL
185694	1997 TF_{16}	—	October 7, 1997	Kitt Peak	Spacewatch	(5)	1.7 km	MPC · JPL
185695	1997 US_{12}	—	October 23, 1997	Kitt Peak	Spacewatch	(17392)	1.8 km	MPC · JPL
185696	1997 WJ_{4}	—	November 20, 1997	Kitt Peak	Spacewatch	·	2.7 km	MPC · JPL
185697	1997 WO_{9}	—	November 21, 1997	Kitt Peak	Spacewatch	·	2.2 km	MPC · JPL
185698	1998 BT_{27}	—	January 23, 1998	Kitt Peak	Spacewatch	·	2.1 km	MPC · JPL
185699	1998 BF_{39}	—	January 29, 1998	Kitt Peak	Spacewatch	·	1.9 km	MPC · JPL
185700	1998 DT_{6}	—	February 17, 1998	Kitt Peak	Spacewatch	WIT	1.5 km	MPC · JPL

== 185701–185800 ==
back to top

Designation			Discovery			Properties		Ref
Permanent	Provisional	Named after	Date	Site	Discoverer(s)	Category	Diam.	Ref
185701	1998 FB_{73}	—	March 29, 1998	Caussols	ODAS	·	1.2 km	MPC · JPL
185702	1998 HK_{3}	—	April 20, 1998	Socorro	LINEAR	AMO +1km	850 m	MPC · JPL
185703	1998 KW	—	May 20, 1998	Caussols	ODAS	·	3.6 km	MPC · JPL
185704	1998 OD_{8}	—	July 26, 1998	La Silla	E. W. Elst	·	3.4 km	MPC · JPL
185705	1998 QD_{24}	—	August 17, 1998	Socorro	LINEAR	·	1.4 km	MPC · JPL
185706	1998 QX_{69}	—	August 24, 1998	Socorro	LINEAR	·	2.1 km	MPC · JPL
185707	1998 QU_{77}	—	August 24, 1998	Socorro	LINEAR	·	1.7 km	MPC · JPL
185708	1998 QR_{95}	—	August 19, 1998	Socorro	LINEAR	EUP	6.1 km	MPC · JPL
185709	1998 RM_{14}	—	September 14, 1998	Kitt Peak	Spacewatch	·	5.8 km	MPC · JPL
185710	1998 RQ_{25}	—	September 14, 1998	Socorro	LINEAR	·	2.0 km	MPC · JPL
185711	1998 RB_{70}	—	September 14, 1998	Socorro	LINEAR	·	1.7 km	MPC · JPL
185712	1998 RH_{70}	—	September 14, 1998	Socorro	LINEAR	NYS	2.2 km	MPC · JPL
185713	1998 SC_{3}	—	September 17, 1998	Caussols	ODAS	·	1.6 km	MPC · JPL
185714	1998 SU_{6}	—	September 26, 1998	Socorro	LINEAR	·	6.3 km	MPC · JPL
185715	1998 SJ_{11}	—	September 17, 1998	Caussols	ODAS	·	1.7 km	MPC · JPL
185716	1998 SF_{35}	—	September 24, 1998	Socorro	LINEAR	AMO +1km	630 m	MPC · JPL
185717	1998 SB_{52}	—	September 28, 1998	Kitt Peak	Spacewatch	·	1.4 km	MPC · JPL
185718	1998 SY_{64}	—	September 20, 1998	La Silla	E. W. Elst	·	2.0 km	MPC · JPL
185719	1998 SV_{80}	—	September 26, 1998	Socorro	LINEAR	·	2.6 km	MPC · JPL
185720	1998 SG_{89}	—	September 26, 1998	Socorro	LINEAR	NYS	1.2 km	MPC · JPL
185721	1998 SS_{92}	—	September 26, 1998	Socorro	LINEAR	V	1.2 km	MPC · JPL
185722	1998 SF_{93}	—	September 26, 1998	Socorro	LINEAR	·	1.6 km	MPC · JPL
185723	1998 SB_{99}	—	September 26, 1998	Socorro	LINEAR	NYS	1.9 km	MPC · JPL
185724	1998 SN_{101}	—	September 26, 1998	Socorro	LINEAR	·	2.0 km	MPC · JPL
185725	1998 SZ_{119}	—	September 26, 1998	Socorro	LINEAR	NYS	1.5 km	MPC · JPL
185726	1998 SR_{140}	—	September 26, 1998	Socorro	LINEAR	·	1.2 km	MPC · JPL
185727	1998 SN_{158}	—	September 26, 1998	Socorro	LINEAR	·	1.9 km	MPC · JPL
185728	1998 UZ_{3}	—	October 20, 1998	Caussols	ODAS	·	1.8 km	MPC · JPL
185729	1998 UN_{25}	—	October 18, 1998	La Silla	E. W. Elst	·	1.5 km	MPC · JPL
185730	1998 UR_{35}	—	October 28, 1998	Socorro	LINEAR	·	1.5 km	MPC · JPL
185731	1998 VO_{5}	—	November 8, 1998	Gekko	T. Kagawa	·	2.1 km	MPC · JPL
185732	1998 WV_{11}	—	November 21, 1998	Socorro	LINEAR	·	1.9 km	MPC · JPL
185733 Luigicolzani	1998 WW_{30}	Luigicolzani	November 28, 1998	Sormano	M. Cavagna, A. Testa	·	2.9 km	MPC · JPL
185734	1998 WQ_{32}	—	November 19, 1998	Anderson Mesa	LONEOS	·	2.0 km	MPC · JPL
185735	1998 XD_{10}	—	December 7, 1998	Caussols	ODAS	·	2.1 km	MPC · JPL
185736	1998 XA_{27}	—	December 14, 1998	Socorro	LINEAR	PHO	2.0 km	MPC · JPL
185737	1998 YA_{17}	—	December 22, 1998	Kitt Peak	Spacewatch	·	1.9 km	MPC · JPL
185738	1999 CQ_{65}	—	February 12, 1999	Socorro	LINEAR	·	2.9 km	MPC · JPL
185739	1999 CW_{80}	—	February 12, 1999	Socorro	LINEAR	·	4.3 km	MPC · JPL
185740	1999 CB_{107}	—	February 12, 1999	Socorro	LINEAR	·	2.7 km	MPC · JPL
185741	1999 CA_{145}	—	February 8, 1999	Kitt Peak	Spacewatch	·	1.8 km	MPC · JPL
185742	1999 EE_{13}	—	March 9, 1999	Kitt Peak	Spacewatch	MIS	2.8 km	MPC · JPL
185743	1999 FP_{74}	—	March 20, 1999	Apache Point	SDSS	·	2.7 km	MPC · JPL
185744 Hogan	1999 FK_{90}	Hogan	March 21, 1999	Apache Point	SDSS	·	3.1 km	MPC · JPL
185745	1999 HM_{11}	—	April 16, 1999	Catalina	CSS	·	2.4 km	MPC · JPL
185746	1999 LO_{1}	—	June 7, 1999	Kitt Peak	Spacewatch	·	1.0 km	MPC · JPL
185747	1999 LZ_{29}	—	June 10, 1999	Kitt Peak	Spacewatch	·	2.4 km	MPC · JPL
185748	1999 NX_{4}	—	July 15, 1999	Gnosca	S. Sposetti	·	4.9 km	MPC · JPL
185749	1999 RT_{53}	—	September 7, 1999	Socorro	LINEAR	·	3.4 km	MPC · JPL
185750	1999 RT_{74}	—	September 7, 1999	Socorro	LINEAR	·	2.6 km	MPC · JPL
185751	1999 RE_{109}	—	September 8, 1999	Socorro	LINEAR	·	1.4 km	MPC · JPL
185752	1999 RC_{165}	—	September 9, 1999	Socorro	LINEAR	·	1.3 km	MPC · JPL
185753	1999 RM_{193}	—	September 13, 1999	Eskridge	G. Hug, G. Bell	·	1.4 km	MPC · JPL
185754	1999 RU_{233}	—	September 8, 1999	Catalina	CSS	EOS	3.4 km	MPC · JPL
185755	1999 SV	—	September 16, 1999	Kitt Peak	Spacewatch	THM	2.9 km	MPC · JPL
185756	1999 TM_{9}	—	October 7, 1999	Višnjan Observatory	K. Korlević, M. Jurić	·	1.6 km	MPC · JPL
185757 Kareltrutnovský	1999 TK_{15}	Kareltrutnovský	October 12, 1999	Ondřejov	P. Pravec, P. Kušnirák	·	2.9 km	MPC · JPL
185758	1999 TE_{18}	—	October 10, 1999	Xinglong	SCAP	·	4.6 km	MPC · JPL
185759	1999 TO_{43}	—	October 3, 1999	Kitt Peak	Spacewatch	·	4.4 km	MPC · JPL
185760	1999 TZ_{61}	—	October 7, 1999	Kitt Peak	Spacewatch	·	1.2 km	MPC · JPL
185761	1999 TN_{73}	—	October 10, 1999	Kitt Peak	Spacewatch	·	4.4 km	MPC · JPL
185762	1999 TP_{78}	—	October 11, 1999	Kitt Peak	Spacewatch	·	3.2 km	MPC · JPL
185763	1999 TK_{83}	—	October 12, 1999	Kitt Peak	Spacewatch	·	3.0 km	MPC · JPL
185764	1999 TL_{92}	—	October 2, 1999	Socorro	LINEAR	·	6.0 km	MPC · JPL
185765	1999 TV_{106}	—	October 4, 1999	Socorro	LINEAR	·	3.4 km	MPC · JPL
185766	1999 TK_{114}	—	October 4, 1999	Socorro	LINEAR	·	4.4 km	MPC · JPL
185767	1999 TF_{136}	—	October 6, 1999	Socorro	LINEAR	HYG	3.5 km	MPC · JPL
185768	1999 TZ_{137}	—	October 6, 1999	Socorro	LINEAR	·	1.4 km	MPC · JPL
185769	1999 TG_{164}	—	October 9, 1999	Socorro	LINEAR	·	5.6 km	MPC · JPL
185770	1999 TE_{166}	—	October 10, 1999	Socorro	LINEAR	·	950 m	MPC · JPL
185771	1999 TT_{170}	—	October 10, 1999	Socorro	LINEAR	·	1.4 km	MPC · JPL
185772	1999 TH_{176}	—	October 10, 1999	Socorro	LINEAR	·	1.0 km	MPC · JPL
185773	1999 TO_{232}	—	October 5, 1999	Catalina	CSS	TIR	4.3 km	MPC · JPL
185774	1999 TK_{236}	—	October 3, 1999	Catalina	CSS	·	1.2 km	MPC · JPL
185775	1999 TE_{241}	—	October 4, 1999	Catalina	CSS	·	2.6 km	MPC · JPL
185776	1999 TW_{269}	—	October 3, 1999	Socorro	LINEAR	TEL	2.5 km	MPC · JPL
185777	1999 TY_{290}	—	October 10, 1999	Socorro	LINEAR	·	1.3 km	MPC · JPL
185778	1999 TL_{291}	—	October 10, 1999	Socorro	LINEAR	·	5.1 km	MPC · JPL
185779	1999 UO_{20}	—	October 31, 1999	Kitt Peak	Spacewatch	·	930 m	MPC · JPL
185780	1999 UA_{34}	—	October 31, 1999	Kitt Peak	Spacewatch	EOS	2.7 km	MPC · JPL
185781	1999 US_{40}	—	October 16, 1999	Kitt Peak	Spacewatch	·	2.9 km	MPC · JPL
185782	1999 UG_{43}	—	October 28, 1999	Catalina	CSS	·	5.3 km	MPC · JPL
185783	1999 UP_{48}	—	October 30, 1999	Kitt Peak	Spacewatch	·	940 m	MPC · JPL
185784	1999 UK_{54}	—	October 19, 1999	Kitt Peak	Spacewatch	·	4.0 km	MPC · JPL
185785	1999 VY_{18}	—	November 2, 1999	Kitt Peak	Spacewatch	·	4.3 km	MPC · JPL
185786	1999 VU_{24}	—	November 13, 1999	Oizumi	T. Kobayashi	PHO	1.8 km	MPC · JPL
185787	1999 VH_{32}	—	November 3, 1999	Socorro	LINEAR	·	5.4 km	MPC · JPL
185788	1999 VL_{57}	—	November 4, 1999	Socorro	LINEAR	·	1.2 km	MPC · JPL
185789	1999 VH_{69}	—	November 4, 1999	Socorro	LINEAR	HYG	4.9 km	MPC · JPL
185790	1999 VR_{70}	—	November 4, 1999	Socorro	LINEAR	·	1.4 km	MPC · JPL
185791	1999 VT_{102}	—	November 9, 1999	Socorro	LINEAR	·	1.1 km	MPC · JPL
185792	1999 VH_{105}	—	November 9, 1999	Socorro	LINEAR	·	1.1 km	MPC · JPL
185793	1999 VT_{117}	—	November 9, 1999	Kitt Peak	Spacewatch	·	3.7 km	MPC · JPL
185794	1999 VB_{127}	—	November 9, 1999	Kitt Peak	Spacewatch	·	2.9 km	MPC · JPL
185795	1999 VJ_{143}	—	November 14, 1999	Socorro	LINEAR	·	880 m	MPC · JPL
185796	1999 VA_{151}	—	November 14, 1999	Socorro	LINEAR	EOS	3.3 km	MPC · JPL
185797	1999 VL_{152}	—	November 10, 1999	Kitt Peak	Spacewatch	·	4.3 km	MPC · JPL
185798	1999 VU_{155}	—	November 9, 1999	Socorro	LINEAR	·	1.4 km	MPC · JPL
185799	1999 VW_{155}	—	November 9, 1999	Socorro	LINEAR	·	1.5 km	MPC · JPL
185800	1999 VF_{164}	—	November 14, 1999	Socorro	LINEAR	·	4.9 km	MPC · JPL

== 185801–185900 ==
back to top

Designation			Discovery			Properties		Ref
Permanent	Provisional	Named after	Date	Site	Discoverer(s)	Category	Diam.	Ref
185801	1999 VV_{164}	—	November 14, 1999	Socorro	LINEAR	PHO	1.2 km	MPC · JPL
185802	1999 VA_{166}	—	November 14, 1999	Socorro	LINEAR	·	4.5 km	MPC · JPL
185803	1999 VX_{174}	—	November 4, 1999	Kitt Peak	Spacewatch	·	5.7 km	MPC · JPL
185804	1999 VR_{175}	—	November 11, 1999	Kitt Peak	Spacewatch	·	1.0 km	MPC · JPL
185805	1999 VS_{195}	—	November 3, 1999	Catalina	CSS	·	1 km	MPC · JPL
185806	1999 VF_{197}	—	November 2, 1999	Catalina	CSS	·	4.2 km	MPC · JPL
185807	1999 VL_{206}	—	November 9, 1999	Catalina	CSS	·	1 km	MPC · JPL
185808	1999 VF_{213}	—	November 12, 1999	Socorro	LINEAR	·	3.4 km	MPC · JPL
185809	1999 VU_{218}	—	November 3, 1999	Kitt Peak	Spacewatch	CYB	4.1 km	MPC · JPL
185810	1999 VH_{220}	—	November 3, 1999	Kitt Peak	Spacewatch	EOS	2.7 km	MPC · JPL
185811	1999 VA_{230}	—	November 9, 1999	Catalina	CSS	·	1.1 km	MPC · JPL
185812	1999 XJ_{5}	—	December 4, 1999	Catalina	CSS	HYG	4.2 km	MPC · JPL
185813	1999 XX_{60}	—	December 7, 1999	Socorro	LINEAR	NYS	1.5 km	MPC · JPL
185814	1999 XH_{62}	—	December 7, 1999	Socorro	LINEAR	·	1.5 km	MPC · JPL
185815	1999 XH_{139}	—	December 2, 1999	Kitt Peak	Spacewatch	·	3.7 km	MPC · JPL
185816	1999 XD_{146}	—	December 7, 1999	Kitt Peak	Spacewatch	HYG	4.0 km	MPC · JPL
185817	1999 XP_{197}	—	December 12, 1999	Socorro	LINEAR	·	2.7 km	MPC · JPL
185818	1999 XY_{216}	—	December 13, 1999	Kitt Peak	Spacewatch	MAS	810 m	MPC · JPL
185819	1999 XU_{221}	—	December 15, 1999	Socorro	LINEAR	·	1.6 km	MPC · JPL
185820	1999 XW_{255}	—	December 5, 1999	Kitt Peak	Spacewatch	MAS	1.0 km	MPC · JPL
185821	1999 YL_{15}	—	December 31, 1999	Kitt Peak	Spacewatch	·	3.8 km	MPC · JPL
185822	2000 AU_{4}	—	January 3, 2000	EverStaR	Everstar	·	2.0 km	MPC · JPL
185823	2000 AA_{28}	—	January 3, 2000	Socorro	LINEAR	NYS	1.7 km	MPC · JPL
185824	2000 AW_{37}	—	January 3, 2000	Socorro	LINEAR	·	1.6 km	MPC · JPL
185825	2000 AN_{86}	—	January 5, 2000	Socorro	LINEAR	·	1.1 km	MPC · JPL
185826	2000 AO_{104}	—	January 5, 2000	Socorro	LINEAR	·	1.5 km	MPC · JPL
185827	2000 AA_{134}	—	January 4, 2000	Socorro	LINEAR	·	1.1 km	MPC · JPL
185828	2000 AW_{153}	—	January 2, 2000	Socorro	LINEAR	·	5.9 km	MPC · JPL
185829	2000 AZ_{170}	—	January 7, 2000	Socorro	LINEAR	·	1.2 km	MPC · JPL
185830	2000 AB_{181}	—	January 7, 2000	Socorro	LINEAR	·	1.7 km	MPC · JPL
185831	2000 AO_{219}	—	January 8, 2000	Kitt Peak	Spacewatch	V	990 m	MPC · JPL
185832	2000 AS_{220}	—	January 8, 2000	Kitt Peak	Spacewatch	·	1.4 km	MPC · JPL
185833	2000 AL_{221}	—	January 8, 2000	Kitt Peak	Spacewatch	NYS	1.5 km	MPC · JPL
185834	2000 BO_{12}	—	January 28, 2000	Kitt Peak	Spacewatch	NYS	1.5 km	MPC · JPL
185835	2000 BT_{25}	—	January 30, 2000	Socorro	LINEAR	·	2.0 km	MPC · JPL
185836	2000 BE_{35}	—	January 30, 2000	Socorro	LINEAR	·	1.8 km	MPC · JPL
185837	2000 BH_{37}	—	January 26, 2000	Kitt Peak	Spacewatch	MAS	790 m	MPC · JPL
185838	2000 CB_{11}	—	February 2, 2000	Socorro	LINEAR	V	1.0 km	MPC · JPL
185839	2000 CF_{68}	—	February 1, 2000	Kitt Peak	Spacewatch	·	1.4 km	MPC · JPL
185840	2000 CX_{75}	—	February 8, 2000	Socorro	LINEAR	PHO	1.9 km	MPC · JPL
185841	2000 CJ_{81}	—	February 4, 2000	Socorro	LINEAR	·	3.4 km	MPC · JPL
185842	2000 CH_{98}	—	February 7, 2000	Kitt Peak	Spacewatch	MAS	850 m	MPC · JPL
185843	2000 CW_{113}	—	February 12, 2000	Kitt Peak	Spacewatch	NYS	1.7 km	MPC · JPL
185844	2000 CY_{136}	—	February 3, 2000	Kitt Peak	Spacewatch	NYS	1.5 km	MPC · JPL
185845	2000 DT_{4}	—	February 28, 2000	Socorro	LINEAR	·	2.2 km	MPC · JPL
185846	2000 DB_{30}	—	February 29, 2000	Socorro	LINEAR	·	2.4 km	MPC · JPL
185847	2000 DG_{48}	—	February 29, 2000	Socorro	LINEAR	·	1.9 km	MPC · JPL
185848	2000 DQ_{50}	—	February 29, 2000	Socorro	LINEAR	NYS	1.5 km	MPC · JPL
185849	2000 DK_{66}	—	February 29, 2000	Socorro	LINEAR	·	1.8 km	MPC · JPL
185850	2000 DZ_{85}	—	February 29, 2000	Socorro	LINEAR	V	1 km	MPC · JPL
185851	2000 DP_{107}	—	February 29, 2000	Socorro	LINEAR	APO · PHA · moon	860 m	MPC · JPL
185852	2000 EV_{1}	—	March 3, 2000	Socorro	LINEAR	·	2.0 km	MPC · JPL
185853	2000 ER_{70}	—	March 4, 2000	Socorro	LINEAR	AMO +1km	1.5 km	MPC · JPL
185854	2000 EU_{106}	—	March 9, 2000	Socorro	LINEAR	·	1.9 km	MPC · JPL
185855	2000 EX_{114}	—	March 10, 2000	Kitt Peak	Spacewatch	NYS	1.6 km	MPC · JPL
185856	2000 ER_{129}	—	March 11, 2000	Anderson Mesa	LONEOS	·	3.3 km	MPC · JPL
185857	2000 EZ_{168}	—	March 4, 2000	Socorro	LINEAR	·	2.2 km	MPC · JPL
185858	2000 GB	—	April 1, 2000	Kitt Peak	Spacewatch	·	1.8 km	MPC · JPL
185859	2000 GH_{26}	—	April 5, 2000	Socorro	LINEAR	·	2.3 km	MPC · JPL
185860	2000 GT_{29}	—	April 5, 2000	Socorro	LINEAR	·	1.7 km	MPC · JPL
185861	2000 GU_{150}	—	April 5, 2000	Socorro	LINEAR	3:2	8.0 km	MPC · JPL
185862	2000 GO_{163}	—	April 10, 2000	Haleakala	NEAT	PHO	1.6 km	MPC · JPL
185863	2000 GK_{169}	—	April 2, 2000	Anderson Mesa	LONEOS	H	720 m	MPC · JPL
185864	2000 HJ_{9}	—	April 27, 2000	Socorro	LINEAR	·	1.8 km	MPC · JPL
185865	2000 HG_{39}	—	April 29, 2000	Kitt Peak	Spacewatch	·	2.1 km	MPC · JPL
185866	2000 HL_{92}	—	April 29, 2000	Anderson Mesa	LONEOS	EUN	2.3 km	MPC · JPL
185867	2000 HL_{95}	—	April 28, 2000	Kitt Peak	Spacewatch	·	2.1 km	MPC · JPL
185868	2000 JG_{3}	—	May 3, 2000	Socorro	LINEAR	H	900 m	MPC · JPL
185869	2000 JL_{8}	—	May 5, 2000	Kitt Peak	Spacewatch	·	1.7 km	MPC · JPL
185870	2000 JL_{10}	—	May 7, 2000	Socorro	LINEAR	H	720 m	MPC · JPL
185871	2000 JY_{27}	—	May 7, 2000	Socorro	LINEAR	·	2.9 km	MPC · JPL
185872	2000 KZ	—	May 24, 2000	Kitt Peak	Spacewatch	·	1.4 km	MPC · JPL
185873	2000 KH_{3}	—	May 26, 2000	Socorro	LINEAR	H	1.1 km	MPC · JPL
185874	2000 KW_{4}	—	May 27, 2000	Socorro	LINEAR	H	1.0 km	MPC · JPL
185875	2000 LR_{23}	—	June 7, 2000	Socorro	LINEAR	·	4.2 km	MPC · JPL
185876	2000 NF_{18}	—	July 5, 2000	Anderson Mesa	LONEOS	·	2.3 km	MPC · JPL
185877	2000 OB_{8}	—	July 30, 2000	Socorro	LINEAR	JUN · fast?	2.9 km	MPC · JPL
185878	2000 OD_{22}	—	July 30, 2000	Socorro	LINEAR	·	5.0 km	MPC · JPL
185879	2000 OP_{38}	—	July 30, 2000	Socorro	LINEAR	JUN	1.8 km	MPC · JPL
185880	2000 OQ_{41}	—	July 30, 2000	Socorro	LINEAR	·	3.0 km	MPC · JPL
185881	2000 OQ_{44}	—	July 30, 2000	Socorro	LINEAR	·	2.9 km	MPC · JPL
185882	2000 QC_{15}	—	August 24, 2000	Socorro	LINEAR	EUN	2.3 km	MPC · JPL
185883	2000 QC_{43}	—	August 24, 2000	Socorro	LINEAR	·	2.2 km	MPC · JPL
185884	2000 QX_{48}	—	August 24, 2000	Socorro	LINEAR	·	3.0 km	MPC · JPL
185885	2000 QN_{62}	—	August 28, 2000	Socorro	LINEAR	·	2.7 km	MPC · JPL
185886	2000 QW_{156}	—	August 31, 2000	Socorro	LINEAR	·	2.3 km	MPC · JPL
185887	2000 QR_{158}	—	August 31, 2000	Socorro	LINEAR	·	3.5 km	MPC · JPL
185888	2000 QD_{176}	—	August 31, 2000	Socorro	LINEAR	·	2.9 km	MPC · JPL
185889	2000 QK_{192}	—	August 26, 2000	Socorro	LINEAR	EUN	2.2 km	MPC · JPL
185890	2000 QY_{208}	—	August 31, 2000	Socorro	LINEAR	·	2.5 km	MPC · JPL
185891	2000 QP_{224}	—	August 26, 2000	Haleakala	NEAT	·	3.1 km	MPC · JPL
185892	2000 QT_{229}	—	August 31, 2000	Socorro	LINEAR	·	2.7 km	MPC · JPL
185893	2000 QE_{232}	—	August 30, 2000	Kitt Peak	Spacewatch	AGN	1.6 km	MPC · JPL
185894	2000 QF_{232}	—	August 30, 2000	Kitt Peak	Spacewatch	·	2.8 km	MPC · JPL
185895	2000 RC_{1}	—	September 1, 2000	Socorro	LINEAR	·	4.9 km	MPC · JPL
185896	2000 RD_{13}	—	September 1, 2000	Socorro	LINEAR	·	3.7 km	MPC · JPL
185897	2000 RS_{16}	—	September 1, 2000	Socorro	LINEAR	BRA	2.1 km	MPC · JPL
185898	2000 RE_{48}	—	September 3, 2000	Socorro	LINEAR	·	5.4 km	MPC · JPL
185899	2000 RC_{80}	—	September 1, 2000	Socorro	LINEAR	EUN	1.9 km	MPC · JPL
185900	2000 SV_{1}	—	September 19, 2000	Prescott	P. G. Comba	·	3.1 km	MPC · JPL

== 185901–186000 ==
back to top

Designation			Discovery			Properties		Ref
Permanent	Provisional	Named after	Date	Site	Discoverer(s)	Category	Diam.	Ref
185901	2000 SU_{10}	—	September 24, 2000	Prescott	P. G. Comba	·	4.7 km	MPC · JPL
185902	2000 SH_{34}	—	September 24, 2000	Socorro	LINEAR	·	3.1 km	MPC · JPL
185903	2000 SH_{61}	—	September 24, 2000	Socorro	LINEAR	·	2.8 km	MPC · JPL
185904	2000 SP_{71}	—	September 24, 2000	Socorro	LINEAR	·	2.4 km	MPC · JPL
185905	2000 SM_{90}	—	September 22, 2000	Socorro	LINEAR	·	4.2 km	MPC · JPL
185906	2000 SF_{94}	—	September 23, 2000	Socorro	LINEAR	L5	16 km	MPC · JPL
185907	2000 SZ_{97}	—	September 23, 2000	Socorro	LINEAR	·	3.5 km	MPC · JPL
185908	2000 SZ_{117}	—	September 24, 2000	Socorro	LINEAR	MRX	1.6 km	MPC · JPL
185909	2000 SG_{129}	—	September 26, 2000	Socorro	LINEAR	·	2.8 km	MPC · JPL
185910	2000 SR_{181}	—	September 19, 2000	Haleakala	NEAT	·	2.7 km	MPC · JPL
185911	2000 SC_{183}	—	September 20, 2000	Kitt Peak	Spacewatch	·	2.9 km	MPC · JPL
185912	2000 SN_{183}	—	September 20, 2000	Haleakala	NEAT	·	3.9 km	MPC · JPL
185913	2000 SS_{197}	—	September 24, 2000	Socorro	LINEAR	·	2.8 km	MPC · JPL
185914	2000 SJ_{203}	—	September 24, 2000	Socorro	LINEAR	KOR ·	1.8 km	MPC · JPL
185915	2000 ST_{210}	—	September 25, 2000	Socorro	LINEAR	ADE	4.1 km	MPC · JPL
185916	2000 SO_{262}	—	September 25, 2000	Socorro	LINEAR	·	3.0 km	MPC · JPL
185917	2000 SO_{266}	—	September 26, 2000	Socorro	LINEAR	·	5.1 km	MPC · JPL
185918	2000 SE_{277}	—	September 30, 2000	Socorro	LINEAR	·	3.7 km	MPC · JPL
185919	2000 SM_{284}	—	September 23, 2000	Socorro	LINEAR	L5	11 km	MPC · JPL
185920	2000 SS_{288}	—	September 27, 2000	Socorro	LINEAR	·	3.8 km	MPC · JPL
185921	2000 SN_{298}	—	September 28, 2000	Socorro	LINEAR	·	2.6 km	MPC · JPL
185922	2000 SR_{322}	—	September 28, 2000	Kitt Peak	Spacewatch	·	3.2 km	MPC · JPL
185923	2000 SG_{325}	—	September 29, 2000	Kitt Peak	Spacewatch	·	4.0 km	MPC · JPL
185924	2000 SX_{344}	—	September 20, 2000	Socorro	LINEAR	·	4.4 km	MPC · JPL
185925	2000 TN_{11}	—	October 1, 2000	Socorro	LINEAR	·	2.6 km	MPC · JPL
185926	2000 TE_{41}	—	October 1, 2000	Anderson Mesa	LONEOS	·	5.7 km	MPC · JPL
185927	2000 TU_{41}	—	October 1, 2000	Socorro	LINEAR	MRX	1.6 km	MPC · JPL
185928	2000 TJ_{43}	—	October 1, 2000	Socorro	LINEAR	·	3.3 km	MPC · JPL
185929	2000 TH_{59}	—	October 2, 2000	Anderson Mesa	LONEOS	·	3.4 km	MPC · JPL
185930	2000 TL_{67}	—	October 2, 2000	Socorro	LINEAR	EOS	3.3 km	MPC · JPL
185931	2000 UK_{27}	—	October 24, 2000	Socorro	LINEAR	·	3.5 km	MPC · JPL
185932	2000 UL_{49}	—	October 24, 2000	Socorro	LINEAR	TIN	4.2 km	MPC · JPL
185933	2000 UV_{59}	—	October 25, 2000	Socorro	LINEAR	·	4.2 km	MPC · JPL
185934	2000 UO_{82}	—	October 29, 2000	Socorro	LINEAR	·	3.6 km	MPC · JPL
185935	2000 UK_{108}	—	October 30, 2000	Socorro	LINEAR	fast	2.1 km	MPC · JPL
185936	2000 VJ_{7}	—	November 1, 2000	Socorro	LINEAR	·	3.0 km	MPC · JPL
185937	2000 WM_{16}	—	November 21, 2000	Socorro	LINEAR	·	3.2 km	MPC · JPL
185938	2000 WF_{31}	—	November 20, 2000	Socorro	LINEAR	(22805)	6.4 km	MPC · JPL
185939	2000 WA_{43}	—	November 21, 2000	Socorro	LINEAR	GEF	2.3 km	MPC · JPL
185940	2000 WU_{142}	—	November 20, 2000	Anderson Mesa	LONEOS	·	5.3 km	MPC · JPL
185941	2000 WD_{148}	—	November 28, 2000	Kitt Peak	Spacewatch	·	3.8 km	MPC · JPL
185942	2000 YO_{82}	—	December 30, 2000	Socorro	LINEAR	EOS	3.6 km	MPC · JPL
185943	2000 YB_{98}	—	December 30, 2000	Socorro	LINEAR	·	1.1 km	MPC · JPL
185944	2000 YA_{122}	—	December 23, 2000	Socorro	LINEAR	·	4.7 km	MPC · JPL
185945	2000 YD_{131}	—	December 30, 2000	Socorro	LINEAR	LIX ·	6.6 km	MPC · JPL
185946	2001 AT_{35}	—	January 5, 2001	Socorro	LINEAR	·	4.4 km	MPC · JPL
185947	2001 BU_{17}	—	January 19, 2001	Socorro	LINEAR	HYG	3.9 km	MPC · JPL
185948	2001 BE_{39}	—	January 19, 2001	Kitt Peak	Spacewatch	·	4.5 km	MPC · JPL
185949	2001 BN_{68}	—	January 31, 2001	Socorro	LINEAR	·	1.3 km	MPC · JPL
185950	2001 CH_{7}	—	February 1, 2001	Socorro	LINEAR	·	1.1 km	MPC · JPL
185951	2001 DE_{8}	—	February 16, 2001	Kitt Peak	Spacewatch	·	1.2 km	MPC · JPL
185952	2001 DJ_{33}	—	February 17, 2001	Socorro	LINEAR	NYS ·	4.3 km	MPC · JPL
185953	2001 DE_{42}	—	February 19, 2001	Socorro	LINEAR	·	1.3 km	MPC · JPL
185954	2001 DK_{44}	—	February 19, 2001	Socorro	LINEAR	·	1.2 km	MPC · JPL
185955	2001 DX_{55}	—	February 16, 2001	Kitt Peak	Spacewatch	·	940 m	MPC · JPL
185956	2001 DN_{66}	—	February 19, 2001	Socorro	LINEAR	·	1.3 km	MPC · JPL
185957	2001 DH_{67}	—	February 19, 2001	Socorro	LINEAR	·	1.4 km	MPC · JPL
185958	2001 EB_{19}	—	March 14, 2001	Kitt Peak	Spacewatch	·	1.4 km	MPC · JPL
185959	2001 FL_{7}	—	March 19, 2001	Kitt Peak	Spacewatch	·	1.1 km	MPC · JPL
185960	2001 FW_{70}	—	March 19, 2001	Socorro	LINEAR	NYS	1.6 km	MPC · JPL
185961	2001 FQ_{74}	—	March 19, 2001	Socorro	LINEAR	·	1.1 km	MPC · JPL
185962	2001 FH_{75}	—	March 19, 2001	Socorro	LINEAR	fast	1.5 km	MPC · JPL
185963	2001 FO_{102}	—	March 17, 2001	Kitt Peak	Spacewatch	·	1.4 km	MPC · JPL
185964	2001 FS_{125}	—	March 24, 2001	Kitt Peak	Spacewatch	·	950 m	MPC · JPL
185965	2001 FK_{142}	—	March 23, 2001	Anderson Mesa	LONEOS	·	1.2 km	MPC · JPL
185966	2001 HC_{13}	—	April 18, 2001	Socorro	LINEAR	NYS	1.3 km	MPC · JPL
185967	2001 HR_{15}	—	April 22, 2001	Socorro	LINEAR	·	1.9 km	MPC · JPL
185968	2001 HT_{51}	—	April 23, 2001	Socorro	LINEAR	·	1.1 km	MPC · JPL
185969	2001 HG_{63}	—	April 26, 2001	Anderson Mesa	LONEOS	PHO	1.5 km	MPC · JPL
185970	2001 HP_{66}	—	April 24, 2001	Haleakala	NEAT	·	1.7 km	MPC · JPL
185971	2001 JX_{7}	—	May 15, 2001	Anderson Mesa	LONEOS	(2076)	1.2 km	MPC · JPL
185972	2001 KL_{8}	—	May 18, 2001	Socorro	LINEAR	·	2.0 km	MPC · JPL
185973	2001 KH_{21}	—	May 22, 2001	Socorro	LINEAR	·	2.3 km	MPC · JPL
185974	2001 KP_{22}	—	May 17, 2001	Socorro	LINEAR	·	1.7 km	MPC · JPL
185975	2001 KE_{40}	—	May 22, 2001	Socorro	LINEAR	·	1.4 km	MPC · JPL
185976	2001 KY_{41}	—	May 24, 2001	Ondřejov	P. Kušnirák, P. Pravec	V	870 m	MPC · JPL
185977	2001 MU_{7}	—	June 23, 2001	Eskridge	Farpoint	NYS	1.9 km	MPC · JPL
185978	2001 MO_{9}	—	June 21, 2001	Palomar	NEAT	·	2.2 km	MPC · JPL
185979	2001 MO_{16}	—	June 27, 2001	Palomar	NEAT	·	2.1 km	MPC · JPL
185980	2001 MC_{25}	—	June 16, 2001	Palomar	NEAT	·	2.9 km	MPC · JPL
185981	2001 MN_{30}	—	June 30, 2001	Palomar	NEAT	·	1.9 km	MPC · JPL
185982	2001 NW	—	July 12, 2001	Palomar	NEAT	·	2.8 km	MPC · JPL
185983	2001 NT_{1}	—	July 10, 2001	Palomar	NEAT	·	3.5 km	MPC · JPL
185984	2001 NP_{3}	—	July 13, 2001	Palomar	NEAT	MAS	1.1 km	MPC · JPL
185985	2001 NG_{10}	—	July 14, 2001	Palomar	NEAT	·	2.7 km	MPC · JPL
185986	2001 NA_{11}	—	July 14, 2001	Haleakala	NEAT	MAS	910 m	MPC · JPL
185987	2001 OD_{1}	—	July 17, 2001	Haleakala	NEAT	·	1.7 km	MPC · JPL
185988	2001 OL_{4}	—	July 19, 2001	Palomar	NEAT	·	2.2 km	MPC · JPL
185989	2001 OR_{4}	—	July 19, 2001	Palomar	NEAT	·	3.6 km	MPC · JPL
185990	2001 OS_{12}	—	July 21, 2001	San Marcello	A. Boattini, L. Tesi	·	2.4 km	MPC · JPL
185991	2001 OV_{19}	—	July 19, 2001	Palomar	NEAT	·	1.7 km	MPC · JPL
185992	2001 OA_{32}	—	July 23, 2001	Palomar	NEAT	·	2.7 km	MPC · JPL
185993	2001 OB_{76}	—	July 28, 2001	Haleakala	NEAT	·	3.1 km	MPC · JPL
185994	2001 OB_{77}	—	July 25, 2001	Haleakala	NEAT	·	1.7 km	MPC · JPL
185995	2001 PT_{1}	—	August 8, 2001	Palomar	NEAT	·	1.8 km	MPC · JPL
185996	2001 PR_{32}	—	August 10, 2001	Palomar	NEAT	PHO	1.6 km	MPC · JPL
185997	2001 PE_{35}	—	August 10, 2001	Palomar	NEAT	EUN	1.8 km	MPC · JPL
185998	2001 PM_{46}	—	August 12, 2001	Palomar	NEAT	·	2.0 km	MPC · JPL
185999	2001 PX_{62}	—	August 13, 2001	Haleakala	NEAT	·	1.8 km	MPC · JPL
186000	2001 QC_{7}	—	August 16, 2001	Socorro	LINEAR	NYS	1.5 km	MPC · JPL

back to top

== See also ==
- Meanings of minor-planet names: 185001–186000
