= 185638 Erwinschwab =

Main-belt Asteroid

Discovery
- Discovered by: OAM
- Discovery site: La Sagra Obs.
- Discovery date: 1 March 2008

Designations
- Named after: Erwin Schwab (discoverer of minor planets)
- Alternative designations: 2008 EU_{7} · 1995 UZ_{53} 1999 XL_{246} · 2006 SR_{87} 2006 UP_{322}
- Minor planet category: main-belt · (inner); Nysa–Polana complex

Orbital characteristics
- Epoch 4 September 2017 (JD 2458000.5)
- Uncertainty parameter 0
- Observation arc: 20.65 yr (7,543 days)
- Aphelion: 2.7570 AU
- Perihelion: 2.0058 AU
- Semi-major axis: 2.3814 AU
- Eccentricity: 0.1577
- Orbital period (sidereal): 3.67 yr (1,342 days)
- Mean anomaly: 212.35°
- Mean motion: 0° 16^{m} 5.52^{s} / day
- Inclination: 2.8854°
- Longitude of ascending node: 33.611°
- Argument of perihelion: 134.13°

Physical characteristics
- Dimensions: 0.95 km (estimate at 0.20); 1.8 km (estimate at 0.057)
- Absolute magnitude (H): 17.5 · 17.6

185638 Erwinschwab (provisional designation 2008 EU_{7}) is a potentially sub-kilometer asteroid from the inner regions of the asteroid belt. It was discovered on 1 March 2008, by OAM-astronomers at the La Sagra Observatory in southern Spain. The asteroid is estimated to measure between 950 meters and 1.8 kilometers in diameter and was named after German astronomer Erwin Schwab in 2009.

== Orbit and classification ==
Erwinschwab is a member of the Nysa–Polana complex, a collection of overlapping asteroid families. The asteroid orbits the Sun in the inner main-belt at a distance of 2.0–2.8 AU once every 3 years and 8 months (1,342 days). Its orbit has an eccentricity of 0.16 and an inclination of 3° with respect to the ecliptic.

The body's observation arc begins with its first identification as 1995 UZ53 by Spacewatch at Kitt Peak Observatory in October 1995, more than 12 years prior to its official discovery observation at La Sagra in 2008.

== Physical characteristics ==
The asteroid's spectral type is unknown. The Nysa-Polana complex consist of S-, F- and C-type asteroids (SFC).

=== Diameter and albedo ===
Erwinschwab has not been observed by any space-based telescope such as the Infrared Astronomical Satellite IRAS, the Japanese Akari satellite or the NEOWISE mission of NASA's Wide-field Infrared Survey Explorer. Based on an assumed albedo of 0.20, which is typical for silicaceous asteroid, the asteroid measures 0.95 kilometers in diameter for an absolute magnitude of 17.5. Since members of the Nysa-Polana complex also include carbonaceous asteroid, Erwinschwab's albedo may also be estimated at 0.057, which translates into a larger diameter of 1.8 kilometers.

=== Rotation period ===
As of 2017, no rotational lightcurve of Erwinschwab has been obtained from photometric observations. The body's rotation period, pole axis and shape remain unknown.

== Naming ==
This minor planet was named after German amateur astronomer Erwin Schwab (born 1964), a prolific discoverer of minor planets at the Starkenburg Observatory, Tzec Maun and Taunus observatories since the early 1980s. During his astrometric observation at Taunus, Schwab has collaborated with astronomer Rainer Kling. The official naming citation was published by the Minor Planet Center on 7 June 2009 (M.P.C. 66244).
