= List of minor planets: 184001–185000 =

The following is a partial list of minor planets, running from minor-planet number 184001 through 185000, inclusive. The primary data for this and other partial lists is based on JPL's "Small-Body Orbital Elements" and data available from the Minor Planet Center. Critical list information is also provided by the MPC, unless otherwise specified from Lowell Observatory. A detailed description of the table's columns and additional sources are given on the main page including a complete list of every page in this series, and a statistical break-up on the dynamical classification of minor planets.

Also see the summary list of all named bodies in numerical and alphabetical order, and the corresponding naming citations for the number range of this particular list. New namings may only be added to this list after official publication, as the preannouncement of names is condemned by the Working Group for Small Bodies Nomenclature of the International Astronomical Union.

Near-Earth obj.	MBA (inner)	MBA (outer)	Centaur
Mars-crosser	MBA (middle)	Jupiter trojan	Trans-Neptunian obj.
Unclassified

== 184001–184100 ==
Designation			Discovery			Properties		Ref
Permanent	Provisional	Named after	Date	Site	Discoverer(s)	Category	Diam.	Ref
184001	2004 EQ_{78}	—	March 15, 2004	Catalina	CSS	·	1.6 km	MPC · JPL
184002	2004 EO_{80}	—	March 14, 2004	Socorro	LINEAR	PHO	1.6 km	MPC · JPL
184003	2004 EH_{82}	—	March 15, 2004	Socorro	LINEAR	·	2.0 km	MPC · JPL
184004	2004 EO_{84}	—	March 15, 2004	Socorro	LINEAR	V	1.2 km	MPC · JPL
184005	2004 EH_{90}	—	March 14, 2004	Kitt Peak	Spacewatch	·	1.9 km	MPC · JPL
184006	2004 EF_{91}	—	March 15, 2004	Kitt Peak	Spacewatch	MAS	960 m	MPC · JPL
184007	2004 EX_{92}	—	March 15, 2004	Socorro	LINEAR	·	3.1 km	MPC · JPL
184008	2004 EY_{92}	—	March 15, 2004	Socorro	LINEAR	MAR	1.7 km	MPC · JPL
184009	2004 EJ_{95}	—	March 15, 2004	Socorro	LINEAR	V	1.2 km	MPC · JPL
184010	2004 EE_{97}	—	March 10, 2004	Palomar	NEAT	·	2.4 km	MPC · JPL
184011 Andypuckett	2004 FT_{4}	Andypuckett	March 19, 2004	Antares	R. Holmes	V	1.1 km	MPC · JPL
184012	2004 FT_{12}	—	March 16, 2004	Catalina	CSS	PHO	3.7 km	MPC · JPL
184013	2004 FY_{20}	—	March 16, 2004	Catalina	CSS	V	1.2 km	MPC · JPL
184014	2004 FA_{24}	—	March 17, 2004	Kitt Peak	Spacewatch	HOF	3.6 km	MPC · JPL
184015	2004 FH_{24}	—	March 17, 2004	Kitt Peak	Spacewatch	NYS	1.9 km	MPC · JPL
184016	2004 FW_{27}	—	March 17, 2004	Kitt Peak	Spacewatch	·	1.4 km	MPC · JPL
184017	2004 FP_{31}	—	March 30, 2004	Socorro	LINEAR	PHO	4.1 km	MPC · JPL
184018	2004 FP_{33}	—	March 16, 2004	Socorro	LINEAR	EUN	3.0 km	MPC · JPL
184019	2004 FM_{35}	—	March 16, 2004	Socorro	LINEAR	·	3.3 km	MPC · JPL
184020	2004 FA_{36}	—	March 16, 2004	Socorro	LINEAR	·	1.7 km	MPC · JPL
184021	2004 FY_{36}	—	March 16, 2004	Kitt Peak	Spacewatch	·	2.0 km	MPC · JPL
184022	2004 FE_{39}	—	March 17, 2004	Kitt Peak	Spacewatch	MAS	1.1 km	MPC · JPL
184023	2004 FY_{39}	—	March 18, 2004	Kitt Peak	Spacewatch	·	1.7 km	MPC · JPL
184024	2004 FO_{42}	—	March 18, 2004	Kitt Peak	Spacewatch	·	1.6 km	MPC · JPL
184025	2004 FG_{44}	—	March 16, 2004	Catalina	CSS	·	1.5 km	MPC · JPL
184026	2004 FO_{45}	—	March 16, 2004	Socorro	LINEAR	·	2.5 km	MPC · JPL
184027	2004 FG_{50}	—	March 18, 2004	Socorro	LINEAR	·	1.5 km	MPC · JPL
184028	2004 FJ_{55}	—	March 19, 2004	Socorro	LINEAR	·	2.0 km	MPC · JPL
184029	2004 FH_{62}	—	March 19, 2004	Socorro	LINEAR	NYS	1.6 km	MPC · JPL
184030	2004 FT_{63}	—	March 19, 2004	Socorro	LINEAR	·	2.1 km	MPC · JPL
184031	2004 FX_{64}	—	March 19, 2004	Socorro	LINEAR	·	2.3 km	MPC · JPL
184032	2004 FA_{65}	—	March 19, 2004	Socorro	LINEAR	EUN	2.1 km	MPC · JPL
184033	2004 FD_{65}	—	March 19, 2004	Socorro	LINEAR	·	2.5 km	MPC · JPL
184034	2004 FM_{66}	—	March 20, 2004	Socorro	LINEAR	·	1.6 km	MPC · JPL
184035	2004 FF_{67}	—	March 20, 2004	Socorro	LINEAR	·	3.6 km	MPC · JPL
184036	2004 FL_{67}	—	March 20, 2004	Socorro	LINEAR	·	1.6 km	MPC · JPL
184037	2004 FD_{75}	—	March 17, 2004	Kitt Peak	Spacewatch	·	1.1 km	MPC · JPL
184038	2004 FW_{77}	—	March 19, 2004	Socorro	LINEAR	MAS	1.1 km	MPC · JPL
184039	2004 FG_{82}	—	March 17, 2004	Kitt Peak	Spacewatch	KON	4.5 km	MPC · JPL
184040	2004 FJ_{82}	—	March 17, 2004	Kitt Peak	Spacewatch	·	1.6 km	MPC · JPL
184041	2004 FQ_{84}	—	March 18, 2004	Socorro	LINEAR	V	1.4 km	MPC · JPL
184042	2004 FF_{86}	—	March 19, 2004	Palomar	NEAT	V	1.0 km	MPC · JPL
184043	2004 FG_{86}	—	March 19, 2004	Palomar	NEAT	·	2.1 km	MPC · JPL
184044	2004 FM_{86}	—	March 19, 2004	Palomar	NEAT	·	2.1 km	MPC · JPL
184045	2004 FV_{87}	—	March 19, 2004	Socorro	LINEAR	NYS	1.3 km	MPC · JPL
184046	2004 FH_{90}	—	March 20, 2004	Socorro	LINEAR	(5)	1.6 km	MPC · JPL
184047	2004 FX_{92}	—	March 18, 2004	Kitt Peak	Spacewatch	·	1.6 km	MPC · JPL
184048	2004 FU_{96}	—	March 23, 2004	Socorro	LINEAR	EUN	2.5 km	MPC · JPL
184049	2004 FB_{99}	—	March 20, 2004	Socorro	LINEAR	·	1.8 km	MPC · JPL
184050	2004 FL_{99}	—	March 21, 2004	Kitt Peak	Spacewatch	·	3.6 km	MPC · JPL
184051	2004 FQ_{102}	—	March 22, 2004	Socorro	LINEAR	·	1.7 km	MPC · JPL
184052	2004 FR_{102}	—	March 22, 2004	Socorro	LINEAR	·	1.5 km	MPC · JPL
184053	2004 FN_{110}	—	March 25, 2004	Anderson Mesa	LONEOS	·	1.9 km	MPC · JPL
184054	2004 FM_{113}	—	March 21, 2004	Kitt Peak	Spacewatch	·	2.0 km	MPC · JPL
184055	2004 FD_{126}	—	March 27, 2004	Socorro	LINEAR	·	2.5 km	MPC · JPL
184056	2004 FE_{128}	—	March 27, 2004	Socorro	LINEAR	·	2.7 km	MPC · JPL
184057	2004 FY_{130}	—	March 22, 2004	Anderson Mesa	LONEOS	·	1.7 km	MPC · JPL
184058	2004 FC_{139}	—	March 20, 2004	Anderson Mesa	LONEOS	·	1.1 km	MPC · JPL
184059	2004 FG_{143}	—	March 28, 2004	Kitt Peak	Spacewatch	·	2.0 km	MPC · JPL
184060	2004 FR_{146}	—	March 27, 2004	Anderson Mesa	LONEOS	·	2.1 km	MPC · JPL
184061	2004 FM_{148}	—	March 29, 2004	Socorro	LINEAR	·	1.4 km	MPC · JPL
184062	2004 FZ_{151}	—	March 17, 2004	Kitt Peak	Spacewatch	·	1.1 km	MPC · JPL
184063	2004 FS_{162}	—	March 18, 2004	Kitt Peak	Spacewatch	·	2.8 km	MPC · JPL
184064 Miner	2004 GM	Miner	April 10, 2004	Wrightwood	J. W. Young	·	1.9 km	MPC · JPL
184065	2004 GW_{4}	—	April 11, 2004	Palomar	NEAT	·	2.3 km	MPC · JPL
184066	2004 GQ_{7}	—	April 12, 2004	Anderson Mesa	LONEOS	·	2.1 km	MPC · JPL
184067	2004 GT_{7}	—	April 12, 2004	Anderson Mesa	LONEOS	·	1.3 km	MPC · JPL
184068	2004 GX_{7}	—	April 12, 2004	Anderson Mesa	LONEOS	·	1.4 km	MPC · JPL
184069	2004 GH_{9}	—	April 12, 2004	Kitt Peak	Spacewatch	EUN	1.8 km	MPC · JPL
184070	2004 GW_{12}	—	April 11, 2004	Palomar	NEAT	·	2.8 km	MPC · JPL
184071	2004 GD_{17}	—	April 10, 2004	Palomar	NEAT	·	1.6 km	MPC · JPL
184072	2004 GM_{17}	—	April 11, 2004	Catalina	CSS	·	1.9 km	MPC · JPL
184073	2004 GU_{18}	—	April 14, 2004	Anderson Mesa	LONEOS	·	3.3 km	MPC · JPL
184074	2004 GS_{20}	—	April 10, 2004	Palomar	NEAT	·	2.1 km	MPC · JPL
184075	2004 GU_{20}	—	April 10, 2004	Palomar	NEAT	·	3.9 km	MPC · JPL
184076	2004 GY_{23}	—	April 13, 2004	Catalina	CSS	(32418)	2.7 km	MPC · JPL
184077	2004 GC_{24}	—	April 13, 2004	Catalina	CSS	·	1.8 km	MPC · JPL
184078	2004 GY_{25}	—	April 14, 2004	Kitt Peak	Spacewatch	·	3.7 km	MPC · JPL
184079	2004 GC_{27}	—	April 14, 2004	Palomar	NEAT	·	2.5 km	MPC · JPL
184080	2004 GC_{30}	—	April 12, 2004	Kitt Peak	Spacewatch	·	1.7 km	MPC · JPL
184081	2004 GR_{33}	—	April 12, 2004	Kitt Peak	Spacewatch	·	3.7 km	MPC · JPL
184082	2004 GY_{34}	—	April 13, 2004	Palomar	NEAT	·	1.8 km	MPC · JPL
184083	2004 GR_{36}	—	April 13, 2004	Palomar	NEAT	·	1.6 km	MPC · JPL
184084	2004 GY_{38}	—	April 15, 2004	Anderson Mesa	LONEOS	·	1.5 km	MPC · JPL
184085	2004 GS_{39}	—	April 15, 2004	Siding Spring	SSS	·	3.5 km	MPC · JPL
184086	2004 GG_{40}	—	April 11, 2004	Palomar	NEAT	·	2.8 km	MPC · JPL
184087	2004 GP_{41}	—	April 13, 2004	Palomar	NEAT	·	2.1 km	MPC · JPL
184088	2004 GD_{53}	—	April 13, 2004	Kitt Peak	Spacewatch	·	920 m	MPC · JPL
184089	2004 GZ_{58}	—	April 12, 2004	Anderson Mesa	LONEOS	·	1.7 km	MPC · JPL
184090	2004 GE_{70}	—	April 13, 2004	Kitt Peak	Spacewatch	·	2.2 km	MPC · JPL
184091	2004 GL_{72}	—	April 14, 2004	Kitt Peak	Spacewatch	·	2.0 km	MPC · JPL
184092	2004 GZ_{72}	—	April 14, 2004	Anderson Mesa	LONEOS	·	2.4 km	MPC · JPL
184093	2004 GG_{77}	—	April 13, 2004	Siding Spring	SSS	·	4.6 km	MPC · JPL
184094	2004 GF_{81}	—	April 13, 2004	Kitt Peak	Spacewatch	·	1.6 km	MPC · JPL
184095	2004 HH_{3}	—	April 16, 2004	Anderson Mesa	LONEOS	·	2.7 km	MPC · JPL
184096 Kazlauskas	2004 HB_{4}	Kazlauskas	April 16, 2004	Moletai	K. Černis, Zdanavicius, J.	·	2.4 km	MPC · JPL
184097	2004 HQ_{4}	—	April 16, 2004	Socorro	LINEAR	EUN	1.8 km	MPC · JPL
184098	2004 HG_{8}	—	April 16, 2004	Kitt Peak	Spacewatch	AEO	1.6 km	MPC · JPL
184099	2004 HM_{10}	—	April 17, 2004	Socorro	LINEAR	·	2.1 km	MPC · JPL
184100	2004 HQ_{10}	—	April 17, 2004	Socorro	LINEAR	·	2.8 km	MPC · JPL

== 184101–184200 ==
back to top

Designation			Discovery			Properties		Ref
Permanent	Provisional	Named after	Date	Site	Discoverer(s)	Category	Diam.	Ref
184101	2004 HE_{11}	—	April 19, 2004	Socorro	LINEAR	·	1.8 km	MPC · JPL
184102	2004 HC_{12}	—	April 19, 2004	Socorro	LINEAR	·	2.6 km	MPC · JPL
184103	2004 HT_{17}	—	April 17, 2004	Socorro	LINEAR	·	3.0 km	MPC · JPL
184104	2004 HQ_{23}	—	April 16, 2004	Kitt Peak	Spacewatch	·	1.9 km	MPC · JPL
184105	2004 HP_{24}	—	April 17, 2004	Socorro	LINEAR	·	2.5 km	MPC · JPL
184106	2004 HZ_{27}	—	April 20, 2004	Socorro	LINEAR	·	2.3 km	MPC · JPL
184107	2004 HB_{28}	—	April 20, 2004	Socorro	LINEAR	·	1.9 km	MPC · JPL
184108	2004 HG_{30}	—	April 21, 2004	Socorro	LINEAR	MIS	3.8 km	MPC · JPL
184109	2004 HZ_{30}	—	April 21, 2004	Reedy Creek	J. Broughton	·	2.0 km	MPC · JPL
184110	2004 HX_{36}	—	April 20, 2004	Socorro	LINEAR	·	3.2 km	MPC · JPL
184111	2004 HC_{38}	—	April 23, 2004	Socorro	LINEAR	·	2.6 km	MPC · JPL
184112	2004 HB_{43}	—	April 20, 2004	Socorro	LINEAR	·	2.0 km	MPC · JPL
184113	2004 HZ_{43}	—	April 21, 2004	Socorro	LINEAR	·	2.9 km	MPC · JPL
184114	2004 HM_{47}	—	April 22, 2004	Socorro	LINEAR	·	1.8 km	MPC · JPL
184115	2004 HJ_{49}	—	April 23, 2004	Campo Imperatore	CINEOS	RAF	1.5 km	MPC · JPL
184116	2004 HY_{54}	—	April 21, 2004	Socorro	LINEAR	·	2.0 km	MPC · JPL
184117	2004 HQ_{56}	—	April 26, 2004	Socorro	LINEAR	·	2.7 km	MPC · JPL
184118	2004 HG_{58}	—	April 22, 2004	Kitt Peak	Spacewatch	·	3.0 km	MPC · JPL
184119	2004 HG_{59}	—	April 25, 2004	Socorro	LINEAR	ADE	3.1 km	MPC · JPL
184120	2004 HU_{59}	—	April 25, 2004	Catalina	CSS	·	2.5 km	MPC · JPL
184121	2004 HF_{60}	—	April 25, 2004	Socorro	LINEAR	RAF	1.4 km	MPC · JPL
184122	2004 HG_{62}	—	April 30, 2004	Reedy Creek	J. Broughton	·	4.8 km	MPC · JPL
184123	2004 HQ_{66}	—	April 21, 2004	Kitt Peak	Spacewatch	AEO	1.7 km	MPC · JPL
184124	2004 HW_{71}	—	April 25, 2004	Kitt Peak	Spacewatch	·	1.3 km	MPC · JPL
184125	2004 HG_{72}	—	April 26, 2004	Anderson Mesa	LONEOS	·	1.7 km	MPC · JPL
184126	2004 JD_{1}	—	May 9, 2004	Haleakala	NEAT	·	3.1 km	MPC · JPL
184127	2004 JJ_{1}	—	May 11, 2004	Desert Eagle	W. K. Y. Yeung	GEF	2.2 km	MPC · JPL
184128	2004 JB_{11}	—	May 12, 2004	Catalina	CSS	·	2.4 km	MPC · JPL
184129	2004 JL_{11}	—	May 13, 2004	Anderson Mesa	LONEOS	·	1.9 km	MPC · JPL
184130	2004 JT_{12}	—	May 13, 2004	Reedy Creek	J. Broughton	·	3.0 km	MPC · JPL
184131	2004 JH_{14}	—	May 9, 2004	Kitt Peak	Spacewatch	·	1.7 km	MPC · JPL
184132	2004 JN_{14}	—	May 9, 2004	Kitt Peak	Spacewatch	HNS	2.0 km	MPC · JPL
184133	2004 JX_{14}	—	May 9, 2004	Haleakala	NEAT	·	4.3 km	MPC · JPL
184134	2004 JQ_{15}	—	May 10, 2004	Palomar	NEAT	·	2.3 km	MPC · JPL
184135	2004 JA_{17}	—	May 12, 2004	Siding Spring	SSS	·	4.1 km	MPC · JPL
184136	2004 JB_{18}	—	May 13, 2004	Anderson Mesa	LONEOS	·	2.5 km	MPC · JPL
184137	2004 JU_{18}	—	May 13, 2004	Kitt Peak	Spacewatch	·	3.4 km	MPC · JPL
184138	2004 JM_{19}	—	May 13, 2004	Palomar	NEAT	·	2.2 km	MPC · JPL
184139	2004 JC_{20}	—	May 14, 2004	Socorro	LINEAR	·	1.6 km	MPC · JPL
184140	2004 JW_{22}	—	May 10, 2004	Haleakala	NEAT	·	2.4 km	MPC · JPL
184141	2004 JG_{23}	—	May 13, 2004	Kitt Peak	Spacewatch	MIS	3.8 km	MPC · JPL
184142	2004 JN_{26}	—	May 15, 2004	Socorro	LINEAR	HNS	2.2 km	MPC · JPL
184143	2004 JQ_{27}	—	May 15, 2004	Socorro	LINEAR	·	2.0 km	MPC · JPL
184144	2004 JY_{30}	—	May 15, 2004	Socorro	LINEAR	·	1.9 km	MPC · JPL
184145	2004 JC_{32}	—	May 13, 2004	Anderson Mesa	LONEOS	·	1.9 km	MPC · JPL
184146	2004 JB_{36}	—	May 15, 2004	Socorro	LINEAR	·	2.7 km	MPC · JPL
184147	2004 JW_{36}	—	May 13, 2004	Kitt Peak	Spacewatch	·	2.4 km	MPC · JPL
184148	2004 JT_{51}	—	May 14, 2004	Socorro	LINEAR	·	1.8 km	MPC · JPL
184149	2004 JD_{52}	—	May 14, 2004	Haleakala	NEAT	·	2.4 km	MPC · JPL
184150	2004 JY_{53}	—	May 9, 2004	Kitt Peak	Spacewatch	·	2.6 km	MPC · JPL
184151	2004 KY	—	May 17, 2004	Reedy Creek	J. Broughton	·	1.8 km	MPC · JPL
184152	2004 KQ_{1}	—	May 18, 2004	Nashville	Clingan, R.	·	3.9 km	MPC · JPL
184153	2004 KJ_{5}	—	May 16, 2004	Kitt Peak	Spacewatch	·	1.5 km	MPC · JPL
184154	2004 KF_{6}	—	May 17, 2004	Socorro	LINEAR	·	2.4 km	MPC · JPL
184155	2004 KW_{7}	—	May 19, 2004	Socorro	LINEAR	·	2.1 km	MPC · JPL
184156	2004 KY_{14}	—	May 23, 2004	Catalina	CSS	·	4.3 km	MPC · JPL
184157	2004 KF_{16}	—	May 24, 2004	Socorro	LINEAR	·	1.8 km	MPC · JPL
184158	2004 KX_{16}	—	May 24, 2004	Socorro	LINEAR	·	3.3 km	MPC · JPL
184159	2004 LW	—	June 5, 2004	Nogales	Tenagra II	JUN	1.4 km	MPC · JPL
184160	2004 LW_{1}	—	June 6, 2004	Catalina	CSS	EUN	2.1 km	MPC · JPL
184161	2004 LM_{2}	—	June 7, 2004	Catalina	CSS	·	2.4 km	MPC · JPL
184162	2004 LB_{3}	—	June 6, 2004	Palomar	NEAT	·	2.4 km	MPC · JPL
184163	2004 LX_{4}	—	June 12, 2004	Kitt Peak	Spacewatch	·	2.6 km	MPC · JPL
184164	2004 LX_{6}	—	June 11, 2004	Socorro	LINEAR	·	2.2 km	MPC · JPL
184165	2004 LC_{9}	—	June 13, 2004	Socorro	LINEAR	·	2.6 km	MPC · JPL
184166	2004 LK_{9}	—	June 13, 2004	Palomar	NEAT	·	3.3 km	MPC · JPL
184167	2004 LS_{16}	—	June 13, 2004	Catalina	CSS	·	4.4 km	MPC · JPL
184168	2004 LD_{28}	—	June 13, 2004	Catalina	CSS	·	5.0 km	MPC · JPL
184169	2004 LC_{31}	—	June 13, 2004	Palomar	NEAT	·	7.2 km	MPC · JPL
184170	2004 MX_{1}	—	June 18, 2004	Reedy Creek	J. Broughton	·	3.1 km	MPC · JPL
184171	2004 MH_{4}	—	June 17, 2004	Palomar	NEAT	·	1.7 km	MPC · JPL
184172	2004 NM_{19}	—	July 14, 2004	Socorro	LINEAR	·	3.6 km	MPC · JPL
184173	2004 NC_{24}	—	July 14, 2004	Socorro	LINEAR	·	3.1 km	MPC · JPL
184174	2004 NS_{25}	—	July 11, 2004	Socorro	LINEAR	·	3.6 km	MPC · JPL
184175	2004 NT_{28}	—	July 14, 2004	Socorro	LINEAR	·	3.6 km	MPC · JPL
184176	2004 NK_{30}	—	July 13, 2004	Siding Spring	SSS	JUN	1.9 km	MPC · JPL
184177	2004 NA_{31}	—	July 9, 2004	Anderson Mesa	LONEOS	·	3.1 km	MPC · JPL
184178	2004 NV_{31}	—	July 15, 2004	Siding Spring	SSS	EOS	2.6 km	MPC · JPL
184179	2004 NC_{33}	—	July 11, 2004	Socorro	LINEAR	·	4.9 km	MPC · JPL
184180	2004 NN_{33}	—	July 15, 2004	Siding Spring	SSS	fast	6.3 km	MPC · JPL
184181	2004 OO	—	July 17, 2004	7300 Observatory	W. K. Y. Yeung	THM	3.2 km	MPC · JPL
184182	2004 OC_{4}	—	July 17, 2004	Socorro	LINEAR	HYG	5.0 km	MPC · JPL
184183	2004 ON_{4}	—	July 16, 2004	Socorro	LINEAR	·	3.3 km	MPC · JPL
184184	2004 OX_{11}	—	July 27, 2004	Socorro	LINEAR	·	3.3 km	MPC · JPL
184185	2004 PX	—	August 6, 2004	Palomar	NEAT	EOS	5.4 km	MPC · JPL
184186	2004 PZ_{1}	—	August 6, 2004	Reedy Creek	J. Broughton	·	3.4 km	MPC · JPL
184187	2004 PX_{3}	—	August 3, 2004	Siding Spring	SSS	·	3.7 km	MPC · JPL
184188	2004 PX_{17}	—	August 8, 2004	Socorro	LINEAR	·	2.7 km	MPC · JPL
184189	2004 PO_{19}	—	August 8, 2004	Anderson Mesa	LONEOS	·	5.0 km	MPC · JPL
184190	2004 PY_{19}	—	August 8, 2004	Palomar	NEAT	·	4.5 km	MPC · JPL
184191	2004 PD_{25}	—	August 8, 2004	Socorro	LINEAR	·	3.5 km	MPC · JPL
184192	2004 PC_{30}	—	August 8, 2004	Campo Imperatore	CINEOS	·	4.1 km	MPC · JPL
184193	2004 PO_{30}	—	August 8, 2004	Socorro	LINEAR	CYB	6.3 km	MPC · JPL
184194	2004 PS_{32}	—	August 8, 2004	Socorro	LINEAR	·	4.5 km	MPC · JPL
184195	2004 PU_{33}	—	August 8, 2004	Anderson Mesa	LONEOS	·	2.7 km	MPC · JPL
184196	2004 PF_{36}	—	August 9, 2004	Campo Imperatore	CINEOS	TIR	4.1 km	MPC · JPL
184197	2004 PA_{49}	—	August 8, 2004	Socorro	LINEAR	·	4.0 km	MPC · JPL
184198	2004 PF_{55}	—	August 8, 2004	Palomar	NEAT	·	2.4 km	MPC · JPL
184199	2004 PH_{63}	—	August 10, 2004	Socorro	LINEAR	·	3.0 km	MPC · JPL
184200	2004 PZ_{65}	—	August 6, 2004	Palomar	NEAT	·	2.9 km	MPC · JPL

== 184201–184300 ==
back to top

Designation			Discovery			Properties		Ref
Permanent	Provisional	Named after	Date	Site	Discoverer(s)	Category	Diam.	Ref
184201	2004 PE_{71}	—	August 8, 2004	Socorro	LINEAR	·	2.2 km	MPC · JPL
184202	2004 PL_{74}	—	August 8, 2004	Socorro	LINEAR	·	4.0 km	MPC · JPL
184203	2004 PG_{75}	—	August 8, 2004	Anderson Mesa	LONEOS	·	3.0 km	MPC · JPL
184204	2004 PS_{75}	—	August 8, 2004	Campo Imperatore	CINEOS	·	7.1 km	MPC · JPL
184205	2004 PJ_{81}	—	August 10, 2004	Socorro	LINEAR	DOR	3.8 km	MPC · JPL
184206	2004 PS_{83}	—	August 10, 2004	Socorro	LINEAR	EOS	3.6 km	MPC · JPL
184207	2004 PQ_{88}	—	August 7, 2004	Campo Imperatore	CINEOS	·	3.1 km	MPC · JPL
184208	2004 PR_{94}	—	August 10, 2004	Anderson Mesa	LONEOS	HYG · fast	6.5 km	MPC · JPL
184209	2004 PA_{99}	—	August 8, 2004	Palomar	NEAT	·	5.9 km	MPC · JPL
184210	2004 PB_{107}	—	August 15, 2004	Palomar	NEAT	TIR	3.8 km	MPC · JPL
184211	2004 PN_{111}	—	August 15, 2004	Siding Spring	SSS	·	7.4 km	MPC · JPL
184212	2004 PB_{112}	—	August 13, 2004	Cerro Tololo	M. W. Buie	SDO	123 km	MPC · JPL
184213	2004 PJ_{115}	—	August 8, 2004	Palomar	NEAT	EOS	3.4 km	MPC · JPL
184214	2004 QU_{3}	—	August 21, 2004	Catalina	CSS	·	4.6 km	MPC · JPL
184215	2004 QJ_{27}	—	August 21, 2004	Siding Spring	SSS	·	5.4 km	MPC · JPL
184216	2004 QV_{27}	—	August 22, 2004	Kitt Peak	Spacewatch	·	2.4 km	MPC · JPL
184217	2004 RM_{23}	—	September 7, 2004	Kitt Peak	Spacewatch	·	5.3 km	MPC · JPL
184218	2004 RF_{40}	—	September 7, 2004	Socorro	LINEAR	·	4.6 km	MPC · JPL
184219	2004 RU_{45}	—	September 8, 2004	Socorro	LINEAR	·	5.7 km	MPC · JPL
184220	2004 RQ_{58}	—	September 8, 2004	Socorro	LINEAR	·	3.5 km	MPC · JPL
184221	2004 RS_{67}	—	September 8, 2004	Socorro	LINEAR	LIX	6.8 km	MPC · JPL
184222	2004 RA_{68}	—	September 8, 2004	Socorro	LINEAR	·	3.8 km	MPC · JPL
184223	2004 RD_{69}	—	September 8, 2004	Socorro	LINEAR	·	2.6 km	MPC · JPL
184224	2004 RB_{74}	—	September 8, 2004	Socorro	LINEAR	·	3.7 km	MPC · JPL
184225	2004 RB_{81}	—	September 8, 2004	Socorro	LINEAR	HIL · 3:2 · (3561)	9.7 km	MPC · JPL
184226	2004 RR_{89}	—	September 8, 2004	Socorro	LINEAR	·	5.5 km	MPC · JPL
184227	2004 RW_{89}	—	September 8, 2004	Socorro	LINEAR	ELF	6.0 km	MPC · JPL
184228	2004 RE_{90}	—	September 8, 2004	Socorro	LINEAR	EOS	2.9 km	MPC · JPL
184229	2004 RO_{103}	—	September 8, 2004	Socorro	LINEAR	·	5.1 km	MPC · JPL
184230	2004 RD_{136}	—	September 7, 2004	Palomar	NEAT	·	5.8 km	MPC · JPL
184231	2004 RQ_{147}	—	September 9, 2004	Socorro	LINEAR	·	2.6 km	MPC · JPL
184232	2004 RS_{147}	—	September 9, 2004	Socorro	LINEAR	·	4.5 km	MPC · JPL
184233	2004 RA_{151}	—	September 9, 2004	Socorro	LINEAR	·	5.7 km	MPC · JPL
184234	2004 RK_{152}	—	September 10, 2004	Socorro	LINEAR	·	2.6 km	MPC · JPL
184235	2004 RR_{186}	—	September 10, 2004	Socorro	LINEAR	HYG	4.3 km	MPC · JPL
184236	2004 RQ_{197}	—	September 10, 2004	Socorro	LINEAR	HYG	4.2 km	MPC · JPL
184237	2004 RM_{206}	—	September 11, 2004	Socorro	LINEAR	·	3.4 km	MPC · JPL
184238	2004 RF_{208}	—	September 11, 2004	Socorro	LINEAR	·	4.2 km	MPC · JPL
184239	2004 RE_{227}	—	September 9, 2004	Kitt Peak	Spacewatch	·	5.0 km	MPC · JPL
184240	2004 RM_{232}	—	September 9, 2004	Kitt Peak	Spacewatch	·	5.0 km	MPC · JPL
184241	2004 RD_{235}	—	September 10, 2004	Socorro	LINEAR	HIL · 3:2	9.2 km	MPC · JPL
184242	2004 RL_{244}	—	September 10, 2004	Kitt Peak	Spacewatch	·	3.6 km	MPC · JPL
184243	2004 RQ_{253}	—	September 6, 2004	Palomar	NEAT	HYG	6.0 km	MPC · JPL
184244	2004 RW_{290}	—	September 9, 2004	Socorro	LINEAR	·	2.9 km	MPC · JPL
184245	2004 RY_{315}	—	September 15, 2004	Siding Spring	SSS	·	7.2 km	MPC · JPL
184246	2004 RY_{332}	—	September 15, 2004	Anderson Mesa	LONEOS	·	5.3 km	MPC · JPL
184247	2004 RZ_{332}	—	September 15, 2004	Anderson Mesa	LONEOS	·	5.2 km	MPC · JPL
184248	2004 SX_{11}	—	September 16, 2004	Siding Spring	SSS	·	4.3 km	MPC · JPL
184249	2004 SE_{29}	—	September 17, 2004	Socorro	LINEAR	TIR	3.8 km	MPC · JPL
184250	2004 SD_{33}	—	September 17, 2004	Socorro	LINEAR	·	3.5 km	MPC · JPL
184251	2004 SD_{47}	—	September 18, 2004	Socorro	LINEAR	CYB	6.2 km	MPC · JPL
184252	2004 TV_{5}	—	October 5, 2004	Kitt Peak	Spacewatch	THM	2.9 km	MPC · JPL
184253	2004 TP_{7}	—	October 5, 2004	Socorro	LINEAR	TIR	5.1 km	MPC · JPL
184254	2004 TC_{16}	—	October 8, 2004	Palomar	NEAT	·	5.5 km	MPC · JPL
184255	2004 TQ_{65}	—	October 5, 2004	Anderson Mesa	LONEOS	·	4.0 km	MPC · JPL
184256	2004 TG_{66}	—	October 5, 2004	Anderson Mesa	LONEOS	T_{j} (2.97) · 3:2	8.5 km	MPC · JPL
184257	2004 TF_{96}	—	October 5, 2004	Kitt Peak	Spacewatch	3:2	6.1 km	MPC · JPL
184258	2004 TC_{106}	—	October 7, 2004	Socorro	LINEAR	·	3.5 km	MPC · JPL
184259	2004 TY_{116}	—	October 5, 2004	Socorro	LINEAR	·	4.3 km	MPC · JPL
184260	2004 TJ_{124}	—	October 7, 2004	Socorro	LINEAR	·	4.4 km	MPC · JPL
184261	2004 TW_{124}	—	October 7, 2004	Socorro	LINEAR	·	4.0 km	MPC · JPL
184262	2004 TH_{147}	—	October 6, 2004	Kitt Peak	Spacewatch	3:2	6.4 km	MPC · JPL
184263	2004 TP_{179}	—	October 7, 2004	Kitt Peak	Spacewatch	·	1.8 km	MPC · JPL
184264	2004 TZ_{287}	—	October 9, 2004	Kitt Peak	Spacewatch	·	4.0 km	MPC · JPL
184265	2004 UL_{8}	—	October 21, 2004	Socorro	LINEAR	·	1.1 km	MPC · JPL
184266	2004 VW_{14}	—	November 3, 2004	Anderson Mesa	LONEOS	APO · PHA	450 m	MPC · JPL
184267	2004 XD	—	December 1, 2004	Socorro	LINEAR	H	910 m	MPC · JPL
184268	2004 XU_{5}	—	December 7, 2004	Socorro	LINEAR	H	1.1 km	MPC · JPL
184269	2004 XO_{11}	—	December 3, 2004	Kitt Peak	Spacewatch	NYS	1.8 km	MPC · JPL
184270	2004 XU_{41}	—	December 9, 2004	Bergisch Gladbach	W. Bickel	·	1.6 km	MPC · JPL
184271	2004 XL_{90}	—	December 11, 2004	Kitt Peak	Spacewatch	·	1.6 km	MPC · JPL
184272	2004 XR_{114}	—	December 10, 2004	Campo Imperatore	CINEOS	·	1.0 km	MPC · JPL
184273	2004 XR_{137}	—	December 11, 2004	Kitt Peak	Spacewatch	·	3.7 km	MPC · JPL
184274	2004 YW_{24}	—	December 18, 2004	Mount Lemmon	Mount Lemmon Survey	L5	12 km	MPC · JPL
184275 Laffra	2005 AX	Laffra	January 6, 2005	Nogales	J.-C. Merlin	H	780 m	MPC · JPL
184276	2005 AU_{19}	—	January 6, 2005	Catalina	CSS	L5	10 km	MPC · JPL
184277	2005 AB_{22}	—	January 6, 2005	Socorro	LINEAR	·	2.0 km	MPC · JPL
184278	2005 AS_{32}	—	January 11, 2005	Socorro	LINEAR	NYS	1.5 km	MPC · JPL
184279	2005 AM_{43}	—	January 15, 2005	Catalina	CSS	H	850 m	MPC · JPL
184280 Yperion	2005 AQ_{47}	Yperion	January 13, 2005	Jarnac	Jarnac	L5	9.9 km	MPC · JPL
184281	2005 AK_{59}	—	January 15, 2005	Socorro	LINEAR	·	940 m	MPC · JPL
184282	2005 BV_{2}	—	January 19, 2005	Goodricke-Pigott	R. A. Tucker	H	980 m	MPC · JPL
184283	2005 BX_{10}	—	January 16, 2005	Catalina	CSS	H	1.1 km	MPC · JPL
184284	2005 BK_{12}	—	January 17, 2005	Kitt Peak	Spacewatch	L5	12 km	MPC · JPL
184285	2005 CO_{7}	—	February 4, 2005	Socorro	LINEAR	H	1.1 km	MPC · JPL
184286	2005 CW_{13}	—	February 2, 2005	Kitt Peak	Spacewatch	MAS	1.1 km	MPC · JPL
184287	2005 CW_{17}	—	February 2, 2005	Socorro	LINEAR	L5	13 km	MPC · JPL
184288	2005 CD_{25}	—	February 4, 2005	Palomar	NEAT	·	3.5 km	MPC · JPL
184289	2005 CG_{31}	—	February 1, 2005	Kitt Peak	Spacewatch	·	1.4 km	MPC · JPL
184290	2005 CV_{61}	—	February 9, 2005	La Silla	A. Boattini, H. Scholl	NYS	1.6 km	MPC · JPL
184291	2005 CT_{79}	—	February 15, 2005	RAS	Lowe, A.	·	1.1 km	MPC · JPL
184292	2005 EK	—	March 1, 2005	Kitt Peak	Spacewatch	·	2.2 km	MPC · JPL
184293	2005 EB_{2}	—	March 2, 2005	Socorro	LINEAR	H	1.2 km	MPC · JPL
184294	2005 ES_{25}	—	March 3, 2005	Catalina	CSS	·	910 m	MPC · JPL
184295	2005 EJ_{37}	—	March 4, 2005	Mount Lemmon	Mount Lemmon Survey	·	1.5 km	MPC · JPL
184296	2005 EG_{38}	—	March 1, 2005	Catalina	CSS	H	970 m	MPC · JPL
184297	2005 EZ_{46}	—	March 3, 2005	Kitt Peak	Spacewatch	·	810 m	MPC · JPL
184298	2005 ES_{60}	—	March 4, 2005	Catalina	CSS	NYS	1.6 km	MPC · JPL
184299	2005 ES_{78}	—	March 3, 2005	Catalina	CSS	·	4.3 km	MPC · JPL
184300	2005 ED_{114}	—	March 4, 2005	Mount Lemmon	Mount Lemmon Survey	·	1.3 km	MPC · JPL

== 184301–184400 ==
back to top

Designation			Discovery			Properties		Ref
Permanent	Provisional	Named after	Date	Site	Discoverer(s)	Category	Diam.	Ref
184301	2005 EY_{153}	—	March 9, 2005	Socorro	LINEAR	H	610 m	MPC · JPL
184302	2005 EU_{178}	—	March 9, 2005	Kitt Peak	Spacewatch	·	2.1 km	MPC · JPL
184303	2005 EP_{181}	—	March 9, 2005	Catalina	CSS	·	2.5 km	MPC · JPL
184304	2005 EV_{198}	—	March 11, 2005	Mount Lemmon	Mount Lemmon Survey	·	900 m	MPC · JPL
184305	2005 ET_{199}	—	March 12, 2005	Kitt Peak	Spacewatch	·	1.5 km	MPC · JPL
184306	2005 ES_{203}	—	March 11, 2005	Kitt Peak	Spacewatch	L5	13 km	MPC · JPL
184307	2005 ED_{206}	—	March 13, 2005	Catalina	CSS	·	1.3 km	MPC · JPL
184308	2005 EY_{209}	—	March 4, 2005	Kitt Peak	Spacewatch	(17392)	2.2 km	MPC · JPL
184309	2005 EC_{260}	—	March 11, 2005	Kitt Peak	Spacewatch	NYS	1.4 km	MPC · JPL
184310	2005 EZ_{263}	—	March 13, 2005	Kitt Peak	Spacewatch	·	860 m	MPC · JPL
184311	2005 ER_{270}	—	March 10, 2005	Anderson Mesa	LONEOS	(2076)	1.1 km	MPC · JPL
184312	2005 EG_{278}	—	March 9, 2005	Catalina	CSS	H	830 m	MPC · JPL
184313	2005 EO_{283}	—	March 11, 2005	Catalina	CSS	·	2.1 km	MPC · JPL
184314 Mbabamwanawaresa	2005 EO_{302}	Mbabamwanawaresa	March 11, 2005	Kitt Peak	M. W. Buie	cubewano (hot)	253 km	MPC · JPL
184315 Denisbogan	2005 EB_{314}	Denisbogan	March 10, 2005	Kitt Peak	M. W. Buie	MAS	1.1 km	MPC · JPL
184316	2005 EP_{315}	—	March 11, 2005	Kitt Peak	Spacewatch	(11882)	2.4 km	MPC · JPL
184317	2005 EV_{323}	—	March 4, 2005	Jarnac	Jarnac	·	1.9 km	MPC · JPL
184318 Fosanelli	2005 GC_{1}	Fosanelli	April 2, 2005	Ottmarsheim	C. Rinner	·	2.4 km	MPC · JPL
184319	2005 GF_{2}	—	April 1, 2005	Catalina	CSS	·	2.5 km	MPC · JPL
184320	2005 GK_{7}	—	April 1, 2005	Anderson Mesa	LONEOS	·	940 m	MPC · JPL
184321	2005 GA_{8}	—	April 2, 2005	Mount Lemmon	Mount Lemmon Survey	·	1.3 km	MPC · JPL
184322	2005 GH_{30}	—	April 4, 2005	Catalina	CSS	·	4.5 km	MPC · JPL
184323	2005 GD_{32}	—	April 4, 2005	Mount Lemmon	Mount Lemmon Survey	MAS	900 m	MPC · JPL
184324	2005 GB_{39}	—	April 4, 2005	Socorro	LINEAR	·	1.5 km	MPC · JPL
184325	2005 GN_{60}	—	April 6, 2005	Jarnac	Jarnac	·	1.1 km	MPC · JPL
184326	2005 GA_{73}	—	April 4, 2005	Catalina	CSS	·	1.1 km	MPC · JPL
184327	2005 GD_{81}	—	April 8, 2005	Socorro	LINEAR	·	3.3 km	MPC · JPL
184328	2005 GB_{91}	—	April 6, 2005	Kitt Peak	Spacewatch	·	1.2 km	MPC · JPL
184329	2005 GY_{96}	—	April 6, 2005	Mount Lemmon	Mount Lemmon Survey	·	1.1 km	MPC · JPL
184330	2005 GV_{97}	—	April 7, 2005	Kitt Peak	Spacewatch	·	3.2 km	MPC · JPL
184331	2005 GV_{101}	—	April 9, 2005	Socorro	LINEAR	·	960 m	MPC · JPL
184332	2005 GF_{102}	—	April 9, 2005	Kitt Peak	Spacewatch	·	2.6 km	MPC · JPL
184333	2005 GX_{108}	—	April 10, 2005	Mount Lemmon	Mount Lemmon Survey	·	1.1 km	MPC · JPL
184334	2005 GY_{127}	—	April 9, 2005	Socorro	LINEAR	MAR	2.3 km	MPC · JPL
184335	2005 GB_{133}	—	April 10, 2005	Kitt Peak	Spacewatch	·	800 m	MPC · JPL
184336	2005 GM_{139}	—	April 12, 2005	Kitt Peak	Spacewatch	·	1.0 km	MPC · JPL
184337	2005 GN_{143}	—	April 10, 2005	Kitt Peak	Spacewatch	·	1.1 km	MPC · JPL
184338	2005 GB_{151}	—	April 11, 2005	Kitt Peak	Spacewatch	·	1.2 km	MPC · JPL
184339	2005 GA_{154}	—	April 14, 2005	Kitt Peak	Spacewatch	·	1.4 km	MPC · JPL
184340	2005 GM_{163}	—	April 10, 2005	Mount Lemmon	Mount Lemmon Survey	·	1.2 km	MPC · JPL
184341	2005 GX_{176}	—	April 15, 2005	Kitt Peak	Spacewatch	·	860 m	MPC · JPL
184342	2005 GG_{178}	—	April 15, 2005	Kitt Peak	Spacewatch	·	1.2 km	MPC · JPL
184343	2005 GW_{218}	—	April 2, 2005	Mount Lemmon	Mount Lemmon Survey	·	1.3 km	MPC · JPL
184344	2005 HO_{2}	—	April 17, 2005	Kitt Peak	Spacewatch	MAS	930 m	MPC · JPL
184345	2005 HO_{4}	—	April 27, 2005	Campo Imperatore	CINEOS	·	1.0 km	MPC · JPL
184346	2005 HF_{6}	—	April 30, 2005	Kitt Peak	Spacewatch	·	2.6 km	MPC · JPL
184347	2005 HO_{6}	—	April 30, 2005	Kitt Peak	Spacewatch	·	1.0 km	MPC · JPL
184348	2005 HW_{7}	—	April 30, 2005	Palomar	NEAT	·	1.0 km	MPC · JPL
184349	2005 JV	—	May 3, 2005	Socorro	LINEAR	·	970 m	MPC · JPL
184350	2005 JL_{1}	—	May 3, 2005	Kitt Peak	Spacewatch	·	1.2 km	MPC · JPL
184351	2005 JY_{7}	—	May 4, 2005	Mauna Kea	Veillet, C.	·	980 m	MPC · JPL
184352	2005 JA_{16}	—	May 3, 2005	Kitt Peak	Spacewatch	·	1.8 km	MPC · JPL
184353	2005 JK_{22}	—	May 8, 2005	RAS	Lowe, A.	·	1.9 km	MPC · JPL
184354	2005 JZ_{35}	—	May 4, 2005	Kitt Peak	Spacewatch	·	1.1 km	MPC · JPL
184355	2005 JL_{38}	—	May 7, 2005	Kitt Peak	Spacewatch	·	880 m	MPC · JPL
184356	2005 JP_{51}	—	May 4, 2005	Kitt Peak	Spacewatch	·	3.4 km	MPC · JPL
184357	2005 JJ_{55}	—	May 4, 2005	Kitt Peak	Spacewatch	·	900 m	MPC · JPL
184358	2005 JW_{67}	—	May 4, 2005	Palomar	NEAT	·	1.2 km	MPC · JPL
184359	2005 JB_{68}	—	May 4, 2005	Siding Spring	SSS	·	1.2 km	MPC · JPL
184360	2005 JC_{68}	—	May 4, 2005	Siding Spring	SSS	·	920 m	MPC · JPL
184361	2005 JW_{76}	—	May 9, 2005	Mount Lemmon	Mount Lemmon Survey	·	1.0 km	MPC · JPL
184362	2005 JF_{91}	—	May 11, 2005	Palomar	NEAT	·	950 m	MPC · JPL
184363	2005 JX_{101}	—	May 9, 2005	Kitt Peak	Spacewatch	·	1.1 km	MPC · JPL
184364	2005 JE_{103}	—	May 9, 2005	Kitt Peak	Spacewatch	·	2.0 km	MPC · JPL
184365	2005 JP_{104}	—	May 10, 2005	Catalina	CSS	·	1.9 km	MPC · JPL
184366	2005 JW_{106}	—	May 12, 2005	Kitt Peak	Spacewatch	·	960 m	MPC · JPL
184367	2005 JC_{110}	—	May 8, 2005	Kitt Peak	Spacewatch	·	1.1 km	MPC · JPL
184368	2005 JE_{119}	—	May 10, 2005	Kitt Peak	Spacewatch	·	1.2 km	MPC · JPL
184369	2005 JH_{134}	—	May 14, 2005	Mount Lemmon	Mount Lemmon Survey	(5)	1.6 km	MPC · JPL
184370	2005 JB_{144}	—	May 15, 2005	Mount Lemmon	Mount Lemmon Survey	HOF	4.8 km	MPC · JPL
184371	2005 JU_{155}	—	May 4, 2005	Mount Lemmon	Mount Lemmon Survey	·	2.6 km	MPC · JPL
184372	2005 JH_{160}	—	May 7, 2005	Mount Lemmon	Mount Lemmon Survey	MAS	720 m	MPC · JPL
184373	2005 JS_{161}	—	May 8, 2005	Mount Lemmon	Mount Lemmon Survey	·	880 m	MPC · JPL
184374	2005 KT_{4}	—	May 17, 2005	Mount Lemmon	Mount Lemmon Survey	·	1.6 km	MPC · JPL
184375	2005 KM_{7}	—	May 19, 2005	Mount Lemmon	Mount Lemmon Survey	·	1.5 km	MPC · JPL
184376	2005 KS_{9}	—	May 28, 2005	Reedy Creek	J. Broughton	·	1.8 km	MPC · JPL
184377	2005 KL_{10}	—	May 29, 2005	Siding Spring	SSS	·	810 m	MPC · JPL
184378	2005 KS_{11}	—	May 30, 2005	Siding Spring	SSS	·	1.1 km	MPC · JPL
184379	2005 LL_{8}	—	June 3, 2005	Reedy Creek	J. Broughton	·	1.1 km	MPC · JPL
184380	2005 LN_{8}	—	June 4, 2005	Reedy Creek	J. Broughton	·	1.2 km	MPC · JPL
184381	2005 LW_{8}	—	June 1, 2005	Kitt Peak	Spacewatch	·	1.0 km	MPC · JPL
184382	2005 LZ_{15}	—	June 5, 2005	Kitt Peak	Spacewatch	·	1.4 km	MPC · JPL
184383	2005 LU_{16}	—	June 6, 2005	Kitt Peak	Spacewatch	·	1.0 km	MPC · JPL
184384	2005 LA_{18}	—	June 6, 2005	Kitt Peak	Spacewatch	·	1.2 km	MPC · JPL
184385	2005 LO_{18}	—	June 6, 2005	Kitt Peak	Spacewatch	·	3.5 km	MPC · JPL
184386	2005 LS_{43}	—	June 10, 2005	Kitt Peak	Spacewatch	·	1.0 km	MPC · JPL
184387	2005 LY_{43}	—	June 11, 2005	Catalina	CSS	·	3.3 km	MPC · JPL
184388	2005 LG_{44}	—	June 12, 2005	Kitt Peak	Spacewatch	KOR	2.0 km	MPC · JPL
184389	2005 LE_{47}	—	June 13, 2005	Mount Lemmon	Mount Lemmon Survey	NYS	1.6 km	MPC · JPL
184390	2005 LY_{47}	—	June 14, 2005	Mount Lemmon	Mount Lemmon Survey	LEO	3.1 km	MPC · JPL
184391	2005 LY_{52}	—	June 4, 2005	Catalina	CSS	·	1.5 km	MPC · JPL
184392	2005 ME_{2}	—	June 16, 2005	Mount Lemmon	Mount Lemmon Survey	NYS	1.6 km	MPC · JPL
184393	2005 MU_{2}	—	June 17, 2005	Mount Lemmon	Mount Lemmon Survey	MAS	1.0 km	MPC · JPL
184394	2005 MH_{5}	—	June 21, 2005	Palomar	NEAT	·	2.5 km	MPC · JPL
184395	2005 MV_{5}	—	June 21, 2005	Palomar	NEAT	·	2.6 km	MPC · JPL
184396	2005 ME_{6}	—	June 24, 2005	Palomar	NEAT	·	1.2 km	MPC · JPL
184397	2005 MP_{8}	—	June 28, 2005	Kitt Peak	Spacewatch	·	1.1 km	MPC · JPL
184398	2005 MV_{10}	—	June 27, 2005	Kitt Peak	Spacewatch	·	940 m	MPC · JPL
184399	2005 MF_{12}	—	June 28, 2005	Palomar	NEAT	·	1.2 km	MPC · JPL
184400	2005 MG_{12}	—	June 28, 2005	Palomar	NEAT	·	990 m	MPC · JPL

== 184401–184500 ==
back to top

Designation			Discovery			Properties		Ref
Permanent	Provisional	Named after	Date	Site	Discoverer(s)	Category	Diam.	Ref
184401	2005 MP_{12}	—	June 28, 2005	Palomar	NEAT	·	1.7 km	MPC · JPL
184402	2005 MA_{13}	—	June 29, 2005	Palomar	NEAT	V	970 m	MPC · JPL
184403	2005 MQ_{14}	—	June 28, 2005	Palomar	NEAT	·	2.6 km	MPC · JPL
184404	2005 MD_{15}	—	June 29, 2005	Palomar	NEAT	·	1.7 km	MPC · JPL
184405	2005 MD_{18}	—	June 27, 2005	Kitt Peak	Spacewatch	(11882)	2.0 km	MPC · JPL
184406	2005 MT_{20}	—	June 30, 2005	Kitt Peak	Spacewatch	MAS	920 m	MPC · JPL
184407	2005 MF_{22}	—	June 30, 2005	Kitt Peak	Spacewatch	·	1.6 km	MPC · JPL
184408	2005 MZ_{22}	—	June 30, 2005	Catalina	CSS	·	2.8 km	MPC · JPL
184409	2005 MF_{25}	—	June 27, 2005	Kitt Peak	Spacewatch	·	1.3 km	MPC · JPL
184410	2005 MO_{30}	—	June 29, 2005	Kitt Peak	Spacewatch	·	2.5 km	MPC · JPL
184411	2005 MG_{31}	—	June 30, 2005	Kitt Peak	Spacewatch	·	1.6 km	MPC · JPL
184412	2005 MO_{31}	—	June 30, 2005	Catalina	CSS	PHO	1.6 km	MPC · JPL
184413	2005 MS_{32}	—	June 28, 2005	Palomar	NEAT	NYS	1.9 km	MPC · JPL
184414	2005 MQ_{37}	—	June 30, 2005	Kitt Peak	Spacewatch	·	1.4 km	MPC · JPL
184415	2005 MK_{39}	—	June 29, 2005	Palomar	NEAT	MAS	1.1 km	MPC · JPL
184416	2005 ML_{39}	—	June 29, 2005	Palomar	NEAT	·	1.2 km	MPC · JPL
184417	2005 MM_{41}	—	June 30, 2005	Kitt Peak	Spacewatch	KOR	1.5 km	MPC · JPL
184418	2005 MY_{46}	—	June 28, 2005	Palomar	NEAT	·	1.5 km	MPC · JPL
184419	2005 MF_{52}	—	June 30, 2005	Anderson Mesa	LONEOS	·	1.9 km	MPC · JPL
184420	2005 MJ_{52}	—	June 30, 2005	Kitt Peak	Spacewatch	·	3.9 km	MPC · JPL
184421	2005 NG_{2}	—	July 2, 2005	Kitt Peak	Spacewatch	·	1.2 km	MPC · JPL
184422	2005 NE_{4}	—	July 2, 2005	Kitt Peak	Spacewatch	·	1.3 km	MPC · JPL
184423	2005 NY_{6}	—	July 3, 2005	Palomar	NEAT	·	1.8 km	MPC · JPL
184424	2005 ND_{8}	—	July 1, 2005	Kitt Peak	Spacewatch	·	1.8 km	MPC · JPL
184425	2005 NJ_{9}	—	July 1, 2005	Kitt Peak	Spacewatch	·	2.7 km	MPC · JPL
184426	2005 NK_{9}	—	July 1, 2005	Kitt Peak	Spacewatch	AGN	1.4 km	MPC · JPL
184427	2005 NG_{12}	—	July 4, 2005	Mount Lemmon	Mount Lemmon Survey	·	1.9 km	MPC · JPL
184428	2005 NT_{13}	—	July 5, 2005	Kitt Peak	Spacewatch	NYS	1.9 km	MPC · JPL
184429	2005 ND_{14}	—	July 5, 2005	Kitt Peak	Spacewatch	·	1.6 km	MPC · JPL
184430	2005 NW_{17}	—	July 4, 2005	Kitt Peak	Spacewatch	·	1.1 km	MPC · JPL
184431	2005 NX_{17}	—	July 4, 2005	Kitt Peak	Spacewatch	·	1.8 km	MPC · JPL
184432	2005 NX_{19}	—	July 5, 2005	Mount Lemmon	Mount Lemmon Survey	NYS	1.4 km	MPC · JPL
184433	2005 NT_{20}	—	July 2, 2005	Reedy Creek	J. Broughton	·	1.2 km	MPC · JPL
184434	2005 NS_{21}	—	July 1, 2005	Kitt Peak	Spacewatch	·	2.6 km	MPC · JPL
184435	2005 NM_{22}	—	July 1, 2005	Kitt Peak	Spacewatch	·	2.3 km	MPC · JPL
184436	2005 NW_{23}	—	July 4, 2005	Kitt Peak	Spacewatch	WIT	1.2 km	MPC · JPL
184437	2005 NQ_{26}	—	July 5, 2005	Mount Lemmon	Mount Lemmon Survey	NYS	1.4 km	MPC · JPL
184438	2005 NR_{28}	—	July 5, 2005	Palomar	NEAT	·	1.4 km	MPC · JPL
184439	2005 NV_{31}	—	July 5, 2005	Kitt Peak	Spacewatch	·	3.0 km	MPC · JPL
184440	2005 NX_{31}	—	July 5, 2005	Kitt Peak	Spacewatch	KON	5.2 km	MPC · JPL
184441	2005 NG_{32}	—	July 5, 2005	Kitt Peak	Spacewatch	·	1.6 km	MPC · JPL
184442	2005 NQ_{35}	—	July 5, 2005	Kitt Peak	Spacewatch	·	1.4 km	MPC · JPL
184443	2005 NC_{45}	—	July 4, 2005	Kitt Peak	Spacewatch	·	1.5 km	MPC · JPL
184444	2005 ND_{46}	—	July 5, 2005	Mount Lemmon	Mount Lemmon Survey	·	1.8 km	MPC · JPL
184445	2005 NF_{46}	—	July 5, 2005	Mount Lemmon	Mount Lemmon Survey	·	1.1 km	MPC · JPL
184446	2005 NQ_{49}	—	July 4, 2005	Catalina	CSS	·	1.8 km	MPC · JPL
184447	2005 NR_{49}	—	July 4, 2005	Socorro	LINEAR	·	2.4 km	MPC · JPL
184448	2005 NV_{51}	—	July 8, 2005	Kitt Peak	Spacewatch	·	1 km	MPC · JPL
184449	2005 NL_{55}	—	July 7, 2005	Reedy Creek	J. Broughton	·	1.2 km	MPC · JPL
184450	2005 NV_{57}	—	July 5, 2005	Palomar	NEAT	NYS	1.9 km	MPC · JPL
184451	2005 NR_{59}	—	July 9, 2005	Kitt Peak	Spacewatch	·	1.6 km	MPC · JPL
184452	2005 NH_{63}	—	July 13, 2005	RAS	Lowe, A.	URS	6.1 km	MPC · JPL
184453	2005 NX_{63}	—	July 1, 2005	Kitt Peak	Spacewatch	·	940 m	MPC · JPL
184454	2005 NH_{64}	—	July 1, 2005	Kitt Peak	Spacewatch	·	2.7 km	MPC · JPL
184455	2005 NB_{67}	—	July 2, 2005	Catalina	CSS	·	1.9 km	MPC · JPL
184456	2005 NY_{69}	—	July 4, 2005	Mount Lemmon	Mount Lemmon Survey	KOR	1.4 km	MPC · JPL
184457	2005 NL_{76}	—	July 10, 2005	Kitt Peak	Spacewatch	EOS	3.0 km	MPC · JPL
184458	2005 NW_{79}	—	July 10, 2005	Reedy Creek	J. Broughton	·	1.8 km	MPC · JPL
184459	2005 NH_{80}	—	July 10, 2005	Reedy Creek	J. Broughton	·	2.1 km	MPC · JPL
184460	2005 NN_{80}	—	July 13, 2005	Reedy Creek	J. Broughton	NYS	1.5 km	MPC · JPL
184461	2005 NR_{80}	—	July 14, 2005	Reedy Creek	J. Broughton	·	1.4 km	MPC · JPL
184462	2005 ND_{81}	—	July 9, 2005	Kitt Peak	Spacewatch	·	3.2 km	MPC · JPL
184463	2005 NS_{81}	—	July 12, 2005	Mount Lemmon	Mount Lemmon Survey	·	1.7 km	MPC · JPL
184464	2005 NW_{81}	—	July 15, 2005	Kitt Peak	Spacewatch	NYS	1.5 km	MPC · JPL
184465	2005 NZ_{84}	—	July 2, 2005	Catalina	CSS	·	1.5 km	MPC · JPL
184466	2005 NT_{85}	—	July 3, 2005	Mount Lemmon	Mount Lemmon Survey	·	1.9 km	MPC · JPL
184467	2005 NZ_{86}	—	July 3, 2005	Mount Lemmon	Mount Lemmon Survey	·	1.8 km	MPC · JPL
184468	2005 NX_{98}	—	July 10, 2005	Catalina	CSS	·	4.4 km	MPC · JPL
184469	2005 NC_{99}	—	July 10, 2005	Catalina	CSS	·	1.5 km	MPC · JPL
184470	2005 NU_{99}	—	July 11, 2005	Kitt Peak	Spacewatch	·	1.9 km	MPC · JPL
184471	2005 NU_{100}	—	July 2, 2005	Catalina	CSS	MAS	1.5 km	MPC · JPL
184472	2005 NK_{101}	—	July 12, 2005	Mount Lemmon	Mount Lemmon Survey	·	2.0 km	MPC · JPL
184473	2005 NN_{122}	—	July 3, 2005	Mount Lemmon	Mount Lemmon Survey	·	2.9 km	MPC · JPL
184474	2005 OA	—	July 16, 2005	RAS	Lowe, A.	·	980 m	MPC · JPL
184475	2005 OV	—	July 17, 2005	Haleakala	NEAT	·	1.2 km	MPC · JPL
184476	2005 OZ_{1}	—	July 26, 2005	Reedy Creek	J. Broughton	·	1.7 km	MPC · JPL
184477	2005 OD_{2}	—	July 26, 2005	Reedy Creek	J. Broughton	·	2.1 km	MPC · JPL
184478	2005 OO_{5}	—	July 28, 2005	Palomar	NEAT	·	2.3 km	MPC · JPL
184479	2005 OS_{5}	—	July 28, 2005	Palomar	NEAT	·	1.4 km	MPC · JPL
184480	2005 OB_{9}	—	July 26, 2005	Palomar	NEAT	·	2.9 km	MPC · JPL
184481	2005 OE_{11}	—	July 28, 2005	Palomar	NEAT	MAS	1.4 km	MPC · JPL
184482	2005 OG_{12}	—	July 29, 2005	Palomar	NEAT	MAS	960 m	MPC · JPL
184483	2005 OX_{14}	—	July 27, 2005	Reedy Creek	J. Broughton	·	2.3 km	MPC · JPL
184484	2005 OQ_{15}	—	July 29, 2005	Palomar	NEAT	·	1.8 km	MPC · JPL
184485	2005 OY_{17}	—	July 30, 2005	Palomar	NEAT	LIX	4.8 km	MPC · JPL
184486	2005 OA_{18}	—	July 30, 2005	Palomar	NEAT	·	3.8 km	MPC · JPL
184487	2005 OG_{18}	—	July 30, 2005	Palomar	NEAT	·	2.6 km	MPC · JPL
184488	2005 ON_{18}	—	July 30, 2005	Palomar	NEAT	·	1.9 km	MPC · JPL
184489	2005 OY_{18}	—	July 31, 2005	Palomar	NEAT	·	2.0 km	MPC · JPL
184490	2005 OE_{21}	—	July 28, 2005	Palomar	NEAT	·	3.8 km	MPC · JPL
184491	2005 OJ_{21}	—	July 28, 2005	Palomar	NEAT	·	2.0 km	MPC · JPL
184492	2005 OM_{21}	—	July 28, 2005	Palomar	NEAT	·	3.0 km	MPC · JPL
184493	2005 OX_{21}	—	July 29, 2005	Palomar	NEAT	·	2.8 km	MPC · JPL
184494	2005 OE_{26}	—	July 17, 2005	Palomar	NEAT	·	2.6 km	MPC · JPL
184495	2005 OD_{27}	—	July 29, 2005	Palomar	NEAT	NYS	1.9 km	MPC · JPL
184496	2005 OF_{27}	—	July 30, 2005	Palomar	NEAT	·	3.9 km	MPC · JPL
184497	2005 PC_{1}	—	August 1, 2005	Siding Spring	SSS	NYS	1.8 km	MPC · JPL
184498	2005 PP_{2}	—	August 2, 2005	Socorro	LINEAR	MAS	1.3 km	MPC · JPL
184499	2005 PZ_{2}	—	August 2, 2005	Socorro	LINEAR	NYS	2.5 km	MPC · JPL
184500	2005 PR_{5}	—	August 8, 2005	Village-Neuf	Village-Neuf	·	1.2 km	MPC · JPL

== 184501–184600 ==
back to top

Designation			Discovery			Properties		Ref
Permanent	Provisional	Named after	Date	Site	Discoverer(s)	Category	Diam.	Ref
184501 Pimprenelle	2005 PV_{5}	Pimprenelle	August 9, 2005	Saint-Sulpice	B. Christophe	MAS	1.1 km	MPC · JPL
184502	2005 PM_{6}	—	August 9, 2005	Reedy Creek	J. Broughton	·	1.3 km	MPC · JPL
184503	2005 PN_{7}	—	August 4, 2005	Palomar	NEAT	·	1.3 km	MPC · JPL
184504	2005 PZ_{9}	—	August 4, 2005	Palomar	NEAT	·	3.9 km	MPC · JPL
184505	2005 PQ_{11}	—	August 4, 2005	Palomar	NEAT	MAS	920 m	MPC · JPL
184506	2005 PM_{13}	—	August 4, 2005	Palomar	NEAT	·	4.5 km	MPC · JPL
184507	2005 PS_{15}	—	August 4, 2005	Palomar	NEAT	EOS	2.5 km	MPC · JPL
184508 Courroux	2005 PR_{16}	Courroux	August 10, 2005	Vicques	M. Ory	·	4.4 km	MPC · JPL
184509	2005 PC_{19}	—	August 2, 2005	Socorro	LINEAR	EUP	4.9 km	MPC · JPL
184510	2005 QS	—	August 22, 2005	Palomar	NEAT	·	1.4 km	MPC · JPL
184511	2005 QT	—	August 22, 2005	Palomar	NEAT	NYS	2.0 km	MPC · JPL
184512	2005 QP_{2}	—	August 24, 2005	Palomar	NEAT	AGN	1.7 km	MPC · JPL
184513	2005 QW_{3}	—	August 24, 2005	Palomar	NEAT	·	2.1 km	MPC · JPL
184514	2005 QS_{4}	—	August 24, 2005	Palomar	NEAT	·	3.9 km	MPC · JPL
184515	2005 QL_{6}	—	August 24, 2005	Palomar	NEAT	AGN	1.5 km	MPC · JPL
184516	2005 QM_{7}	—	August 24, 2005	Palomar	NEAT	HOF	3.3 km	MPC · JPL
184517	2005 QR_{8}	—	August 25, 2005	Palomar	NEAT	·	2.3 km	MPC · JPL
184518	2005 QT_{9}	—	August 24, 2005	Palomar	NEAT	·	2.0 km	MPC · JPL
184519	2005 QU_{10}	—	August 24, 2005	Needville	J. Dellinger	·	5.3 km	MPC · JPL
184520	2005 QD_{16}	—	August 25, 2005	Palomar	NEAT	·	3.3 km	MPC · JPL
184521	2005 QJ_{16}	—	August 25, 2005	Palomar	NEAT	·	4.8 km	MPC · JPL
184522	2005 QS_{16}	—	August 25, 2005	Palomar	NEAT	·	2.2 km	MPC · JPL
184523	2005 QM_{18}	—	August 25, 2005	Palomar	NEAT	TEL	3.2 km	MPC · JPL
184524	2005 QR_{18}	—	August 25, 2005	Palomar	NEAT	EOS	3.3 km	MPC · JPL
184525	2005 QA_{19}	—	August 25, 2005	Palomar	NEAT	MAS	1.1 km	MPC · JPL
184526	2005 QL_{19}	—	August 25, 2005	Campo Imperatore	CINEOS	·	2.6 km	MPC · JPL
184527	2005 QR_{20}	—	August 26, 2005	Anderson Mesa	LONEOS	·	3.0 km	MPC · JPL
184528	2005 QO_{22}	—	August 27, 2005	Anderson Mesa	LONEOS	·	1.7 km	MPC · JPL
184529	2005 QG_{24}	—	August 27, 2005	Kitt Peak	Spacewatch	·	3.8 km	MPC · JPL
184530	2005 QV_{24}	—	August 27, 2005	Kitt Peak	Spacewatch	·	2.2 km	MPC · JPL
184531	2005 QC_{25}	—	August 27, 2005	Kitt Peak	Spacewatch	THM	3.5 km	MPC · JPL
184532	2005 QQ_{25}	—	August 27, 2005	Kitt Peak	Spacewatch	·	2.5 km	MPC · JPL
184533	2005 QA_{26}	—	August 27, 2005	Kitt Peak	Spacewatch	KOR	2.1 km	MPC · JPL
184534	2005 QY_{29}	—	August 27, 2005	Anderson Mesa	LONEOS	·	4.9 km	MPC · JPL
184535 Audouze	2005 QN_{30}	Audouze	August 29, 2005	Saint-Sulpice	B. Christophe	·	4.9 km	MPC · JPL
184536	2005 QV_{30}	—	August 24, 2005	Palomar	NEAT	·	4.5 km	MPC · JPL
184537	2005 QT_{32}	—	August 25, 2005	Palomar	NEAT	·	3.3 km	MPC · JPL
184538	2005 QW_{35}	—	August 25, 2005	Palomar	NEAT	GEF	2.4 km	MPC · JPL
184539	2005 QG_{36}	—	August 25, 2005	Palomar	NEAT	·	5.2 km	MPC · JPL
184540	2005 QR_{37}	—	August 25, 2005	Palomar	NEAT	·	2.3 km	MPC · JPL
184541	2005 QB_{38}	—	August 25, 2005	Palomar	NEAT	LEO	2.6 km	MPC · JPL
184542	2005 QM_{39}	—	August 26, 2005	Anderson Mesa	LONEOS	·	2.5 km	MPC · JPL
184543	2005 QR_{40}	—	August 26, 2005	Palomar	NEAT	ERI	1.7 km	MPC · JPL
184544	2005 QZ_{42}	—	August 26, 2005	Anderson Mesa	LONEOS	·	2.9 km	MPC · JPL
184545	2005 QS_{44}	—	August 26, 2005	Palomar	NEAT	·	1.7 km	MPC · JPL
184546	2005 QK_{45}	—	August 26, 2005	Palomar	NEAT	GEF	2.0 km	MPC · JPL
184547	2005 QJ_{46}	—	August 26, 2005	Palomar	NEAT	·	2.8 km	MPC · JPL
184548	2005 QN_{47}	—	August 26, 2005	Palomar	NEAT	·	1.9 km	MPC · JPL
184549	2005 QT_{47}	—	August 26, 2005	Palomar	NEAT	·	5.2 km	MPC · JPL
184550	2005 QH_{48}	—	August 26, 2005	Palomar	NEAT	·	2.5 km	MPC · JPL
184551	2005 QJ_{48}	—	August 26, 2005	Palomar	NEAT	MAS	1.1 km	MPC · JPL
184552	2005 QM_{48}	—	August 26, 2005	Palomar	NEAT	·	2.2 km	MPC · JPL
184553	2005 QH_{49}	—	August 26, 2005	Palomar	NEAT	·	1.7 km	MPC · JPL
184554	2005 QK_{49}	—	August 26, 2005	Palomar	NEAT	·	3.4 km	MPC · JPL
184555	2005 QR_{50}	—	August 26, 2005	Palomar	NEAT	·	1.7 km	MPC · JPL
184556	2005 QU_{51}	—	August 27, 2005	Anderson Mesa	LONEOS	PAD	3.2 km	MPC · JPL
184557	2005 QN_{52}	—	August 27, 2005	Haleakala	NEAT	DOR	4.7 km	MPC · JPL
184558	2005 QK_{53}	—	August 28, 2005	Kitt Peak	Spacewatch	·	2.9 km	MPC · JPL
184559	2005 QU_{56}	—	August 29, 2005	Jarnac	Jarnac	·	1.5 km	MPC · JPL
184560	2005 QZ_{59}	—	August 25, 2005	Palomar	NEAT	·	4.0 km	MPC · JPL
184561	2005 QH_{62}	—	August 26, 2005	Palomar	NEAT	THM	2.9 km	MPC · JPL
184562	2005 QE_{66}	—	August 27, 2005	Anderson Mesa	LONEOS	·	1.7 km	MPC · JPL
184563	2005 QZ_{66}	—	August 28, 2005	Kitt Peak	Spacewatch	EOS	2.0 km	MPC · JPL
184564	2005 QS_{72}	—	August 29, 2005	Kitt Peak	Spacewatch	·	2.9 km	MPC · JPL
184565	2005 QD_{74}	—	August 29, 2005	Anderson Mesa	LONEOS	·	2.9 km	MPC · JPL
184566	2005 QX_{78}	—	August 25, 2005	Palomar	NEAT	·	2.7 km	MPC · JPL
184567	2005 QF_{79}	—	August 26, 2005	Campo Imperatore	CINEOS	·	2.3 km	MPC · JPL
184568	2005 QL_{80}	—	August 28, 2005	Anderson Mesa	LONEOS	MAS	1.1 km	MPC · JPL
184569	2005 QU_{82}	—	August 29, 2005	Anderson Mesa	LONEOS	·	3.5 km	MPC · JPL
184570	2005 QF_{85}	—	August 30, 2005	Socorro	LINEAR	·	3.4 km	MPC · JPL
184571	2005 QU_{90}	—	August 25, 2005	Palomar	NEAT	·	2.3 km	MPC · JPL
184572	2005 QE_{91}	—	August 25, 2005	Campo Imperatore	CINEOS	·	2.8 km	MPC · JPL
184573	2005 QK_{92}	—	August 26, 2005	Palomar	NEAT	NEM	3.1 km	MPC · JPL
184574	2005 QQ_{93}	—	August 26, 2005	Palomar	NEAT	·	2.0 km	MPC · JPL
184575	2005 QW_{93}	—	August 26, 2005	Palomar	NEAT	·	2.6 km	MPC · JPL
184576	2005 QD_{94}	—	August 26, 2005	Haleakala	NEAT	·	1.6 km	MPC · JPL
184577	2005 QL_{94}	—	August 27, 2005	Palomar	NEAT	·	1.8 km	MPC · JPL
184578	2005 QB_{100}	—	August 27, 2005	Palomar	NEAT	·	3.4 km	MPC · JPL
184579	2005 QP_{105}	—	August 27, 2005	Palomar	NEAT	·	1.5 km	MPC · JPL
184580	2005 QD_{106}	—	August 27, 2005	Palomar	NEAT	·	3.4 km	MPC · JPL
184581	2005 QM_{106}	—	August 27, 2005	Palomar	NEAT	·	3.1 km	MPC · JPL
184582	2005 QC_{107}	—	August 27, 2005	Palomar	NEAT	ERI	2.9 km	MPC · JPL
184583	2005 QY_{113}	—	August 27, 2005	Palomar	NEAT	·	2.6 km	MPC · JPL
184584	2005 QX_{115}	—	August 28, 2005	Kitt Peak	Spacewatch	·	2.5 km	MPC · JPL
184585	2005 QZ_{115}	—	August 28, 2005	Kitt Peak	Spacewatch	NAE	3.0 km	MPC · JPL
184586	2005 QA_{116}	—	August 28, 2005	Kitt Peak	Spacewatch	AGN	1.7 km	MPC · JPL
184587	2005 QB_{118}	—	August 28, 2005	Kitt Peak	Spacewatch	AST	3.0 km	MPC · JPL
184588	2005 QF_{119}	—	August 28, 2005	Kitt Peak	Spacewatch	·	2.0 km	MPC · JPL
184589	2005 QK_{119}	—	August 28, 2005	Kitt Peak	Spacewatch	·	1.9 km	MPC · JPL
184590	2005 QM_{122}	—	August 28, 2005	Kitt Peak	Spacewatch	·	3.3 km	MPC · JPL
184591	2005 QD_{126}	—	August 28, 2005	Kitt Peak	Spacewatch	·	2.2 km	MPC · JPL
184592	2005 QV_{128}	—	August 28, 2005	Kitt Peak	Spacewatch	·	2.7 km	MPC · JPL
184593	2005 QY_{130}	—	August 28, 2005	Kitt Peak	Spacewatch	·	1.6 km	MPC · JPL
184594	2005 QV_{142}	—	August 31, 2005	Anderson Mesa	LONEOS	·	2.4 km	MPC · JPL
184595	2005 QC_{144}	—	August 26, 2005	Palomar	NEAT	·	1.7 km	MPC · JPL
184596	2005 QJ_{148}	—	August 30, 2005	Anderson Mesa	LONEOS	·	4.5 km	MPC · JPL
184597	2005 QL_{148}	—	August 30, 2005	Anderson Mesa	LONEOS	·	1.5 km	MPC · JPL
184598	2005 QM_{148}	—	August 30, 2005	Anderson Mesa	LONEOS	·	2.7 km	MPC · JPL
184599	2005 QA_{150}	—	August 27, 2005	Kitt Peak	Spacewatch	·	2.5 km	MPC · JPL
184600	2005 QN_{154}	—	August 27, 2005	Palomar	NEAT	·	2.1 km	MPC · JPL

== 184601–184700 ==
back to top

Designation			Discovery			Properties		Ref
Permanent	Provisional	Named after	Date	Site	Discoverer(s)	Category	Diam.	Ref
184601	2005 QY_{160}	—	August 28, 2005	Kitt Peak	Spacewatch	(5)	1.2 km	MPC · JPL
184602	2005 QL_{161}	—	August 28, 2005	Siding Spring	SSS	·	2.3 km	MPC · JPL
184603	2005 QG_{162}	—	August 29, 2005	Socorro	LINEAR	·	3.6 km	MPC · JPL
184604	2005 QG_{174}	—	August 31, 2005	Anderson Mesa	LONEOS	EOS	2.9 km	MPC · JPL
184605	2005 QF_{177}	—	August 27, 2005	Palomar	NEAT	·	3.9 km	MPC · JPL
184606	2005 QH_{178}	—	August 26, 2005	Palomar	NEAT	·	1.5 km	MPC · JPL
184607	2005 QF_{182}	—	August 31, 2005	Palomar	NEAT	·	2.5 km	MPC · JPL
184608	2005 QG_{182}	—	August 31, 2005	Palomar	NEAT	HOF	3.5 km	MPC · JPL
184609	2005 QJ_{182}	—	August 31, 2005	Kitt Peak	Spacewatch	·	2.8 km	MPC · JPL
184610	2005 RN	—	September 1, 2005	Saint-Véran	St. Veran	·	2.1 km	MPC · JPL
184611	2005 RG_{3}	—	September 5, 2005	Catalina	CSS	MAS	1.4 km	MPC · JPL
184612	2005 RU_{6}	—	September 3, 2005	Palomar	NEAT	ERI	2.7 km	MPC · JPL
184613	2005 RV_{8}	—	September 8, 2005	Socorro	LINEAR	·	2.9 km	MPC · JPL
184614	2005 RC_{9}	—	September 8, 2005	Socorro	LINEAR	·	3.6 km	MPC · JPL
184615	2005 RD_{10}	—	September 6, 2005	Siding Spring	SSS	·	1.4 km	MPC · JPL
184616	2005 RE_{11}	—	September 10, 2005	Anderson Mesa	LONEOS	EOS · slow	4.1 km	MPC · JPL
184617	2005 RJ_{12}	—	September 1, 2005	Kitt Peak	Spacewatch	AGN	1.6 km	MPC · JPL
184618	2005 RJ_{16}	—	September 1, 2005	Kitt Peak	Spacewatch	·	4.0 km	MPC · JPL
184619	2005 RS_{21}	—	September 6, 2005	Anderson Mesa	LONEOS	·	3.0 km	MPC · JPL
184620 Pippobattaglia	2005 RA_{24}	Pippobattaglia	September 10, 2005	Vallemare di Borbona	V. S. Casulli	·	3.1 km	MPC · JPL
184621	2005 RD_{26}	—	September 12, 2005	Junk Bond	D. Healy	KOR	1.9 km	MPC · JPL
184622	2005 RN_{26}	—	September 8, 2005	Socorro	LINEAR	AEO	1.7 km	MPC · JPL
184623	2005 RS_{26}	—	September 8, 2005	Socorro	LINEAR	·	4.6 km	MPC · JPL
184624	2005 RT_{29}	—	September 7, 2005	Bergisch Gladbach	W. Bickel	·	2.8 km	MPC · JPL
184625	2005 RX_{32}	—	September 8, 2005	Socorro	LINEAR	·	2.5 km	MPC · JPL
184626	2005 RH_{40}	—	September 6, 2005	Anderson Mesa	LONEOS	·	2.6 km	MPC · JPL
184627	2005 RX_{43}	—	September 3, 2005	Palomar	NEAT	·	2.3 km	MPC · JPL
184628	2005 RU_{45}	—	September 14, 2005	Apache Point	A. C. Becker	·	3.5 km	MPC · JPL
184629	2005 SX_{1}	—	September 23, 2005	Junk Bond	D. Healy	·	1.7 km	MPC · JPL
184630	2005 SS_{2}	—	September 23, 2005	Catalina	CSS	·	2.7 km	MPC · JPL
184631	2005 SK_{4}	—	September 24, 2005	Altschwendt	W. Ries	TIN	1.4 km	MPC · JPL
184632	2005 SO_{9}	—	September 25, 2005	Altschwendt	W. Ries	·	1.7 km	MPC · JPL
184633	2005 SU_{11}	—	September 23, 2005	Kitt Peak	Spacewatch	THM	3.6 km	MPC · JPL
184634	2005 SB_{12}	—	September 23, 2005	Kitt Peak	Spacewatch	·	7.9 km	MPC · JPL
184635	2005 SG_{12}	—	September 23, 2005	Catalina	CSS	·	1.6 km	MPC · JPL
184636	2005 SD_{13}	—	September 24, 2005	Kitt Peak	Spacewatch	·	4.2 km	MPC · JPL
184637	2005 SL_{14}	—	September 25, 2005	Catalina	CSS	615	2.3 km	MPC · JPL
184638	2005 SS_{15}	—	September 26, 2005	Kitt Peak	Spacewatch	·	4.9 km	MPC · JPL
184639	2005 SX_{18}	—	September 26, 2005	Kitt Peak	Spacewatch	HYG	4.3 km	MPC · JPL
184640	2005 SF_{20}	—	September 23, 2005	Kitt Peak	Spacewatch	EUN	2.5 km	MPC · JPL
184641	2005 SG_{20}	—	September 23, 2005	Kitt Peak	Spacewatch	AGN	1.8 km	MPC · JPL
184642	2005 SX_{20}	—	September 25, 2005	Kitt Peak	Spacewatch	·	4.4 km	MPC · JPL
184643	2005 SB_{21}	—	September 26, 2005	Catalina	CSS	·	2.8 km	MPC · JPL
184644	2005 SJ_{22}	—	September 23, 2005	Kitt Peak	Spacewatch	·	2.8 km	MPC · JPL
184645	2005 ST_{22}	—	September 23, 2005	Kitt Peak	Spacewatch	KOR	2.2 km	MPC · JPL
184646	2005 SC_{24}	—	September 24, 2005	Anderson Mesa	LONEOS	·	2.7 km	MPC · JPL
184647	2005 SM_{24}	—	September 24, 2005	Anderson Mesa	LONEOS	·	4.7 km	MPC · JPL
184648	2005 SY_{26}	—	September 23, 2005	Kitt Peak	Spacewatch	NYS	1.7 km	MPC · JPL
184649	2005 SQ_{29}	—	September 23, 2005	Kitt Peak	Spacewatch	AGN	1.8 km	MPC · JPL
184650	2005 SG_{31}	—	September 23, 2005	Catalina	CSS	MAS	910 m	MPC · JPL
184651	2005 SX_{31}	—	September 23, 2005	Kitt Peak	Spacewatch	KOR	1.7 km	MPC · JPL
184652	2005 SD_{33}	—	September 23, 2005	Kitt Peak	Spacewatch	·	6.1 km	MPC · JPL
184653	2005 SQ_{34}	—	September 23, 2005	Kitt Peak	Spacewatch	·	5.2 km	MPC · JPL
184654	2005 SF_{35}	—	September 23, 2005	Kitt Peak	Spacewatch	KOR	1.8 km	MPC · JPL
184655	2005 SQ_{35}	—	September 23, 2005	Kitt Peak	Spacewatch	·	3.3 km	MPC · JPL
184656	2005 SW_{35}	—	September 23, 2005	Kitt Peak	Spacewatch	AGN	1.7 km	MPC · JPL
184657	2005 SX_{39}	—	September 24, 2005	Kitt Peak	Spacewatch	·	2.7 km	MPC · JPL
184658	2005 SO_{40}	—	September 24, 2005	Kitt Peak	Spacewatch	THM	3.6 km	MPC · JPL
184659	2005 SJ_{41}	—	September 24, 2005	Kitt Peak	Spacewatch	HYG	3.4 km	MPC · JPL
184660	2005 SK_{47}	—	September 24, 2005	Kitt Peak	Spacewatch	·	2.6 km	MPC · JPL
184661	2005 SW_{51}	—	September 24, 2005	Kitt Peak	Spacewatch	EOS	3.7 km	MPC · JPL
184662	2005 SE_{52}	—	September 24, 2005	Kitt Peak	Spacewatch	·	3.7 km	MPC · JPL
184663	2005 SM_{52}	—	September 25, 2005	Kitt Peak	Spacewatch	·	3.8 km	MPC · JPL
184664	2005 SK_{55}	—	September 25, 2005	Kitt Peak	Spacewatch	·	5.1 km	MPC · JPL
184665	2005 SX_{55}	—	September 25, 2005	Kitt Peak	Spacewatch	KOR	1.5 km	MPC · JPL
184666	2005 SQ_{58}	—	September 26, 2005	Kitt Peak	Spacewatch	·	3.4 km	MPC · JPL
184667	2005 SO_{59}	—	September 26, 2005	Kitt Peak	Spacewatch	KOR	1.9 km	MPC · JPL
184668	2005 SK_{60}	—	September 26, 2005	Palomar	NEAT	·	3.0 km	MPC · JPL
184669	2005 SF_{61}	—	September 26, 2005	Kitt Peak	Spacewatch	·	1.8 km	MPC · JPL
184670	2005 SP_{61}	—	September 26, 2005	Kitt Peak	Spacewatch	RAF	1.4 km	MPC · JPL
184671	2005 SW_{62}	—	September 26, 2005	Kitt Peak	Spacewatch	MRX	1.6 km	MPC · JPL
184672	2005 SL_{64}	—	September 26, 2005	Kitt Peak	Spacewatch	·	2.1 km	MPC · JPL
184673	2005 SX_{64}	—	September 26, 2005	Palomar	NEAT	·	4.4 km	MPC · JPL
184674	2005 SC_{65}	—	September 26, 2005	Palomar	NEAT	NEM	3.4 km	MPC · JPL
184675	2005 SQ_{71}	—	September 23, 2005	Catalina	CSS	·	2.9 km	MPC · JPL
184676	2005 SC_{75}	—	September 24, 2005	Kitt Peak	Spacewatch	·	3.9 km	MPC · JPL
184677	2005 SJ_{77}	—	September 24, 2005	Kitt Peak	Spacewatch	THM	2.9 km	MPC · JPL
184678	2005 SU_{77}	—	September 24, 2005	Kitt Peak	Spacewatch	KOR	1.7 km	MPC · JPL
184679	2005 SM_{78}	—	September 24, 2005	Kitt Peak	Spacewatch	KOR	1.8 km	MPC · JPL
184680	2005 ST_{79}	—	September 24, 2005	Kitt Peak	Spacewatch	·	3.1 km	MPC · JPL
184681	2005 SB_{81}	—	September 24, 2005	Kitt Peak	Spacewatch	TEL	1.8 km	MPC · JPL
184682	2005 SF_{84}	—	September 24, 2005	Kitt Peak	Spacewatch	CYB	6.7 km	MPC · JPL
184683	2005 SL_{85}	—	September 24, 2005	Kitt Peak	Spacewatch	EOS	2.2 km	MPC · JPL
184684	2005 SS_{85}	—	September 24, 2005	Kitt Peak	Spacewatch	AGN	1.7 km	MPC · JPL
184685	2005 SN_{86}	—	September 24, 2005	Kitt Peak	Spacewatch	KOR	1.6 km	MPC · JPL
184686	2005 SP_{87}	—	September 24, 2005	Kitt Peak	Spacewatch	KOR	1.6 km	MPC · JPL
184687	2005 SR_{87}	—	September 24, 2005	Kitt Peak	Spacewatch	·	5.4 km	MPC · JPL
184688	2005 SS_{90}	—	September 24, 2005	Kitt Peak	Spacewatch	·	2.4 km	MPC · JPL
184689	2005 SL_{95}	—	September 25, 2005	Kitt Peak	Spacewatch	·	2.1 km	MPC · JPL
184690	2005 SV_{95}	—	September 25, 2005	Kitt Peak	Spacewatch	KOR	1.9 km	MPC · JPL
184691	2005 SV_{97}	—	September 25, 2005	Palomar	NEAT	·	1.9 km	MPC · JPL
184692	2005 SJ_{101}	—	September 25, 2005	Kitt Peak	Spacewatch	·	4.1 km	MPC · JPL
184693	2005 SG_{103}	—	September 25, 2005	Palomar	NEAT	AGN	1.9 km	MPC · JPL
184694	2005 SL_{104}	—	September 25, 2005	Kitt Peak	Spacewatch	·	4.6 km	MPC · JPL
184695	2005 ST_{104}	—	September 25, 2005	Kitt Peak	Spacewatch	·	4.3 km	MPC · JPL
184696	2005 SO_{111}	—	September 26, 2005	Kitt Peak	Spacewatch	EUN	1.8 km	MPC · JPL
184697	2005 SG_{114}	—	September 27, 2005	Kitt Peak	Spacewatch	·	2.9 km	MPC · JPL
184698	2005 SJ_{114}	—	September 27, 2005	Kitt Peak	Spacewatch	·	4.3 km	MPC · JPL
184699	2005 SK_{115}	—	September 27, 2005	Kitt Peak	Spacewatch	·	4.6 km	MPC · JPL
184700	2005 SV_{115}	—	September 27, 2005	Kitt Peak	Spacewatch	·	3.2 km	MPC · JPL

== 184701–184800 ==
back to top

Designation			Discovery			Properties		Ref
Permanent	Provisional	Named after	Date	Site	Discoverer(s)	Category	Diam.	Ref
184701	2005 SN_{117}	—	September 28, 2005	Palomar	NEAT	·	2.9 km	MPC · JPL
184702	2005 SH_{122}	—	September 29, 2005	Kitt Peak	Spacewatch	·	3.5 km	MPC · JPL
184703	2005 SD_{123}	—	September 29, 2005	Palomar	NEAT	AGN	1.7 km	MPC · JPL
184704	2005 SG_{123}	—	September 29, 2005	Anderson Mesa	LONEOS	·	4.5 km	MPC · JPL
184705	2005 SJ_{123}	—	September 29, 2005	Anderson Mesa	LONEOS	·	2.7 km	MPC · JPL
184706	2005 SQ_{129}	—	September 29, 2005	Mount Lemmon	Mount Lemmon Survey	AGN	2.0 km	MPC · JPL
184707	2005 SL_{131}	—	September 29, 2005	Kitt Peak	Spacewatch	·	2.5 km	MPC · JPL
184708	2005 SD_{134}	—	September 30, 2005	Calvin-Rehoboth	L. A. Molnar	·	2.2 km	MPC · JPL
184709	2005 SA_{138}	—	September 25, 2005	Kitt Peak	Spacewatch	·	4.4 km	MPC · JPL
184710	2005 SL_{138}	—	September 25, 2005	Kitt Peak	Spacewatch	GEF	1.7 km	MPC · JPL
184711	2005 SV_{140}	—	September 25, 2005	Kitt Peak	Spacewatch	·	1.9 km	MPC · JPL
184712	2005 SA_{141}	—	September 25, 2005	Kitt Peak	Spacewatch	·	3.7 km	MPC · JPL
184713	2005 SR_{147}	—	September 25, 2005	Kitt Peak	Spacewatch	·	3.1 km	MPC · JPL
184714	2005 SJ_{150}	—	September 25, 2005	Kitt Peak	Spacewatch	·	3.5 km	MPC · JPL
184715	2005 SD_{153}	—	September 25, 2005	Kitt Peak	Spacewatch	·	1.5 km	MPC · JPL
184716	2005 SG_{155}	—	September 26, 2005	Socorro	LINEAR	·	2.0 km	MPC · JPL
184717	2005 SV_{157}	—	September 26, 2005	Kitt Peak	Spacewatch	·	2.2 km	MPC · JPL
184718	2005 SU_{160}	—	September 27, 2005	Kitt Peak	Spacewatch	·	4.1 km	MPC · JPL
184719	2005 SC_{162}	—	September 27, 2005	Kitt Peak	Spacewatch	·	2.7 km	MPC · JPL
184720	2005 SH_{162}	—	September 27, 2005	Kitt Peak	Spacewatch	·	4.3 km	MPC · JPL
184721	2005 SG_{163}	—	September 27, 2005	Kitt Peak	Spacewatch	·	2.0 km	MPC · JPL
184722	2005 SP_{164}	—	September 27, 2005	Palomar	NEAT	·	2.4 km	MPC · JPL
184723	2005 SQ_{165}	—	September 28, 2005	Palomar	NEAT	·	4.2 km	MPC · JPL
184724	2005 SU_{166}	—	September 28, 2005	Palomar	NEAT	·	3.3 km	MPC · JPL
184725	2005 SE_{170}	—	September 29, 2005	Anderson Mesa	LONEOS	·	4.2 km	MPC · JPL
184726	2005 SQ_{172}	—	September 29, 2005	Kitt Peak	Spacewatch	·	2.5 km	MPC · JPL
184727	2005 SQ_{173}	—	September 29, 2005	Anderson Mesa	LONEOS	EOS	2.9 km	MPC · JPL
184728	2005 SX_{176}	—	September 29, 2005	Kitt Peak	Spacewatch	·	2.9 km	MPC · JPL
184729	2005 SV_{179}	—	September 29, 2005	Anderson Mesa	LONEOS	·	2.4 km	MPC · JPL
184730	2005 SM_{180}	—	September 29, 2005	Mount Lemmon	Mount Lemmon Survey	·	3.4 km	MPC · JPL
184731	2005 SY_{180}	—	September 29, 2005	Kitt Peak	Spacewatch	·	3.1 km	MPC · JPL
184732	2005 SG_{185}	—	September 29, 2005	Kitt Peak	Spacewatch	·	4.3 km	MPC · JPL
184733	2005 SF_{186}	—	September 29, 2005	Palomar	NEAT	·	2.9 km	MPC · JPL
184734	2005 SC_{190}	—	September 29, 2005	Mount Lemmon	Mount Lemmon Survey	·	3.3 km	MPC · JPL
184735	2005 SL_{192}	—	September 29, 2005	Mount Lemmon	Mount Lemmon Survey	·	4.3 km	MPC · JPL
184736	2005 SV_{204}	—	September 30, 2005	Anderson Mesa	LONEOS	NYS	1.6 km	MPC · JPL
184737	2005 SA_{205}	—	September 30, 2005	Anderson Mesa	LONEOS	(13314)	3.0 km	MPC · JPL
184738	2005 SS_{207}	—	September 30, 2005	Kitt Peak	Spacewatch	EOS	2.7 km	MPC · JPL
184739	2005 SO_{210}	—	September 30, 2005	Palomar	NEAT	EOS	3.8 km	MPC · JPL
184740	2005 SS_{217}	—	September 30, 2005	Palomar	NEAT	EUN	2.6 km	MPC · JPL
184741	2005 SU_{217}	—	September 30, 2005	Palomar	NEAT	HOF	4.9 km	MPC · JPL
184742	2005 SA_{225}	—	September 29, 2005	Mount Lemmon	Mount Lemmon Survey	·	4.1 km	MPC · JPL
184743	2005 SE_{230}	—	September 30, 2005	Mount Lemmon	Mount Lemmon Survey	·	2.9 km	MPC · JPL
184744	2005 SB_{238}	—	September 29, 2005	Kitt Peak	Spacewatch	·	3.2 km	MPC · JPL
184745	2005 SD_{245}	—	September 30, 2005	Mount Lemmon	Mount Lemmon Survey	·	2.2 km	MPC · JPL
184746	2005 SU_{246}	—	September 30, 2005	Kitt Peak	Spacewatch	EOS	2.1 km	MPC · JPL
184747	2005 SA_{247}	—	September 30, 2005	Kitt Peak	Spacewatch	·	5.6 km	MPC · JPL
184748	2005 SE_{247}	—	September 30, 2005	Kitt Peak	Spacewatch	EOS	2.6 km	MPC · JPL
184749	2005 SK_{247}	—	September 30, 2005	Kitt Peak	Spacewatch	·	2.4 km	MPC · JPL
184750	2005 SM_{248}	—	September 30, 2005	Mount Lemmon	Mount Lemmon Survey	EUN	1.4 km	MPC · JPL
184751	2005 SQ_{249}	—	September 23, 2005	Kitt Peak	Spacewatch	·	2.8 km	MPC · JPL
184752	2005 SM_{252}	—	September 24, 2005	Palomar	NEAT	·	2.5 km	MPC · JPL
184753	2005 SF_{253}	—	September 24, 2005	Palomar	NEAT	·	3.1 km	MPC · JPL
184754	2005 SJ_{253}	—	September 30, 2005	Mount Lemmon	Mount Lemmon Survey	EOS	4.2 km	MPC · JPL
184755	2005 SS_{254}	—	September 22, 2005	Palomar	NEAT	·	4.0 km	MPC · JPL
184756	2005 SX_{254}	—	September 22, 2005	Palomar	NEAT	·	2.0 km	MPC · JPL
184757	2005 SN_{255}	—	September 22, 2005	Palomar	NEAT	·	3.7 km	MPC · JPL
184758	2005 SN_{257}	—	September 22, 2005	Palomar	NEAT	·	5.0 km	MPC · JPL
184759	2005 SK_{263}	—	September 23, 2005	Kitt Peak	Spacewatch	·	2.3 km	MPC · JPL
184760	2005 SX_{266}	—	September 29, 2005	Anderson Mesa	LONEOS	·	2.7 km	MPC · JPL
184761	2005 SR_{268}	—	September 24, 2005	Palomar	NEAT	AGN	1.9 km	MPC · JPL
184762	2005 SG_{278}	—	September 23, 2005	Kitt Peak	Spacewatch	·	3.9 km	MPC · JPL
184763	2005 SZ_{278}	—	September 26, 2005	Kitt Peak	Spacewatch	·	3.5 km	MPC · JPL
184764	2005 SL_{279}	—	September 23, 2005	Catalina	CSS	EUN	1.6 km	MPC · JPL
184765	2005 SO_{285}	—	September 25, 2005	Apache Point	A. C. Becker	·	2.7 km	MPC · JPL
184766	2005 TO_{3}	—	October 1, 2005	Anderson Mesa	LONEOS	·	2.1 km	MPC · JPL
184767	2005 TR_{4}	—	October 1, 2005	Mount Lemmon	Mount Lemmon Survey	AST	2.4 km	MPC · JPL
184768	2005 TS_{7}	—	October 1, 2005	Kitt Peak	Spacewatch	·	3.1 km	MPC · JPL
184769	2005 TZ_{8}	—	October 1, 2005	Kitt Peak	Spacewatch	·	4.0 km	MPC · JPL
184770	2005 TU_{9}	—	October 1, 2005	Mount Lemmon	Mount Lemmon Survey	·	3.3 km	MPC · JPL
184771	2005 TO_{10}	—	October 2, 2005	Palomar	NEAT	·	3.9 km	MPC · JPL
184772	2005 TY_{13}	—	October 1, 2005	Socorro	LINEAR	·	3.3 km	MPC · JPL
184773	2005 TC_{16}	—	October 1, 2005	Mount Lemmon	Mount Lemmon Survey	AGN	1.7 km	MPC · JPL
184774	2005 TG_{17}	—	October 1, 2005	Kitt Peak	Spacewatch	KOR	2.2 km	MPC · JPL
184775	2005 TH_{18}	—	October 1, 2005	Socorro	LINEAR	HYG	3.5 km	MPC · JPL
184776	2005 TN_{18}	—	October 1, 2005	Socorro	LINEAR	·	2.8 km	MPC · JPL
184777	2005 TL_{26}	—	October 1, 2005	Mount Lemmon	Mount Lemmon Survey	EOS	2.6 km	MPC · JPL
184778 Kevinoberheim	2005 TL_{27}	Kevinoberheim	October 1, 2005	Catalina	CSS	·	2.8 km	MPC · JPL
184779 Bericoberheim	2005 TO_{27}	Bericoberheim	October 1, 2005	Catalina	CSS	·	3.2 km	MPC · JPL
184780	2005 TN_{28}	—	October 1, 2005	Mount Lemmon	Mount Lemmon Survey	3:2	7.8 km	MPC · JPL
184781	2005 TW_{29}	—	October 4, 2005	Palomar	NEAT	·	3.0 km	MPC · JPL
184782	2005 TT_{33}	—	October 1, 2005	Kitt Peak	Spacewatch	·	1.9 km	MPC · JPL
184783	2005 TU_{39}	—	October 1, 2005	Kitt Peak	Spacewatch	·	1.9 km	MPC · JPL
184784 Bettiepage	2005 TZ_{41}	Bettiepage	October 3, 2005	Catalina	CSS	·	3.7 km	MPC · JPL
184785	2005 TP_{47}	—	October 5, 2005	Kitt Peak	Spacewatch	MIS	3.8 km	MPC · JPL
184786	2005 TE_{53}	—	October 8, 2005	Moletai	K. Černis, Zdanavicius, J.	KOR	1.5 km	MPC · JPL
184787	2005 TH_{54}	—	October 1, 2005	Kitt Peak	Spacewatch	·	3.1 km	MPC · JPL
184788	2005 TL_{55}	—	October 5, 2005	Kitt Peak	Spacewatch	·	5.1 km	MPC · JPL
184789	2005 TY_{56}	—	October 1, 2005	Mount Lemmon	Mount Lemmon Survey	·	4.3 km	MPC · JPL
184790	2005 TD_{57}	—	October 1, 2005	Mount Lemmon	Mount Lemmon Survey	·	1.7 km	MPC · JPL
184791	2005 TM_{58}	—	October 1, 2005	Mount Lemmon	Mount Lemmon Survey	·	2.2 km	MPC · JPL
184792	2005 TT_{63}	—	October 6, 2005	Anderson Mesa	LONEOS	·	4.0 km	MPC · JPL
184793	2005 TJ_{64}	—	October 6, 2005	Mount Lemmon	Mount Lemmon Survey	KOR	1.4 km	MPC · JPL
184794	2005 TK_{64}	—	October 6, 2005	Mount Lemmon	Mount Lemmon Survey	·	2.5 km	MPC · JPL
184795	2005 TR_{74}	—	October 1, 2005	Anderson Mesa	LONEOS	·	3.0 km	MPC · JPL
184796	2005 TO_{81}	—	October 3, 2005	Kitt Peak	Spacewatch	·	3.5 km	MPC · JPL
184797	2005 TQ_{85}	—	October 3, 2005	Kitt Peak	Spacewatch	·	4.0 km	MPC · JPL
184798	2005 TW_{87}	—	October 5, 2005	Kitt Peak	Spacewatch	·	1.6 km	MPC · JPL
184799	2005 TE_{90}	—	October 5, 2005	Kitt Peak	Spacewatch	·	1.9 km	MPC · JPL
184800	2005 TV_{98}	—	October 7, 2005	Mount Lemmon	Mount Lemmon Survey	·	3.3 km	MPC · JPL

== 184801–184900 ==
back to top

Designation			Discovery			Properties		Ref
Permanent	Provisional	Named after	Date	Site	Discoverer(s)	Category	Diam.	Ref
184801	2005 TE_{101}	—	October 7, 2005	Catalina	CSS	·	2.5 km	MPC · JPL
184802	2005 TH_{101}	—	October 7, 2005	Catalina	CSS	EMA	5.2 km	MPC · JPL
184803	2005 TB_{110}	—	October 7, 2005	Kitt Peak	Spacewatch	·	5.3 km	MPC · JPL
184804	2005 TF_{112}	—	October 7, 2005	Kitt Peak	Spacewatch	HYG	3.7 km	MPC · JPL
184805	2005 TX_{115}	—	October 7, 2005	Kitt Peak	Spacewatch	KOR	2.1 km	MPC · JPL
184806	2005 TH_{121}	—	October 7, 2005	Kitt Peak	Spacewatch	THM	3.3 km	MPC · JPL
184807	2005 TK_{122}	—	October 7, 2005	Kitt Peak	Spacewatch	·	2.0 km	MPC · JPL
184808	2005 TX_{122}	—	October 7, 2005	Kitt Peak	Spacewatch	·	3.3 km	MPC · JPL
184809	2005 TQ_{124}	—	October 7, 2005	Kitt Peak	Spacewatch	KOR	1.8 km	MPC · JPL
184810	2005 TG_{126}	—	October 7, 2005	Kitt Peak	Spacewatch	·	3.3 km	MPC · JPL
184811	2005 TX_{127}	—	October 7, 2005	Kitt Peak	Spacewatch	HYG	3.2 km	MPC · JPL
184812	2005 TK_{129}	—	October 7, 2005	Kitt Peak	Spacewatch	KOR	1.8 km	MPC · JPL
184813	2005 TU_{129}	—	October 7, 2005	Kitt Peak	Spacewatch	·	4.4 km	MPC · JPL
184814	2005 TF_{135}	—	October 5, 2005	Socorro	LINEAR	·	2.7 km	MPC · JPL
184815	2005 TP_{136}	—	October 6, 2005	Kitt Peak	Spacewatch	·	2.0 km	MPC · JPL
184816	2005 TS_{136}	—	October 6, 2005	Kitt Peak	Spacewatch	·	2.4 km	MPC · JPL
184817	2005 TJ_{140}	—	October 8, 2005	Kitt Peak	Spacewatch	·	2.5 km	MPC · JPL
184818	2005 TX_{140}	—	October 8, 2005	Kitt Peak	Spacewatch	KOR	1.6 km	MPC · JPL
184819	2005 TU_{160}	—	October 9, 2005	Kitt Peak	Spacewatch	·	2.6 km	MPC · JPL
184820	2005 TR_{162}	—	October 9, 2005	Kitt Peak	Spacewatch	·	2.9 km	MPC · JPL
184821	2005 TY_{162}	—	October 9, 2005	Kitt Peak	Spacewatch	·	2.5 km	MPC · JPL
184822	2005 TK_{167}	—	October 9, 2005	Kitt Peak	Spacewatch	·	3.1 km	MPC · JPL
184823	2005 TX_{170}	—	October 12, 2005	Kitt Peak	Spacewatch	·	5.5 km	MPC · JPL
184824	2005 TA_{178}	—	October 1, 2005	Catalina	CSS	EOS	3.2 km	MPC · JPL
184825	2005 TZ_{178}	—	October 5, 2005	Mount Lemmon	Mount Lemmon Survey	·	4.1 km	MPC · JPL
184826	2005 TE_{190}	—	October 1, 2005	Catalina	CSS	EUN	1.8 km	MPC · JPL
184827	2005 TP_{190}	—	October 1, 2005	Kitt Peak	Spacewatch	·	2.2 km	MPC · JPL
184828	2005 TX_{191}	—	October 3, 2005	Catalina	CSS	·	2.9 km	MPC · JPL
184829	2005 UJ	—	October 22, 2005	Kitt Peak	Spacewatch	L5	13 km	MPC · JPL
184830	2005 UQ_{6}	—	October 29, 2005	Socorro	LINEAR	·	2.0 km	MPC · JPL
184831	2005 UY_{8}	—	October 20, 2005	Palomar	NEAT	EUN	2.8 km	MPC · JPL
184832	2005 UV_{9}	—	October 21, 2005	Palomar	NEAT	·	3.1 km	MPC · JPL
184833	2005 UA_{10}	—	October 21, 2005	Palomar	NEAT	LIX	4.9 km	MPC · JPL
184834	2005 UP_{14}	—	October 22, 2005	Kitt Peak	Spacewatch	·	4.4 km	MPC · JPL
184835	2005 UG_{21}	—	October 23, 2005	Kitt Peak	Spacewatch	·	3.7 km	MPC · JPL
184836	2005 UV_{22}	—	October 23, 2005	Kitt Peak	Spacewatch	·	5.2 km	MPC · JPL
184837	2005 UD_{26}	—	October 23, 2005	Kitt Peak	Spacewatch	·	3.1 km	MPC · JPL
184838	2005 UX_{33}	—	October 24, 2005	Kitt Peak	Spacewatch	·	5.4 km	MPC · JPL
184839	2005 UT_{36}	—	October 24, 2005	Kitt Peak	Spacewatch	·	3.3 km	MPC · JPL
184840	2005 UL_{37}	—	October 24, 2005	Kitt Peak	Spacewatch	·	6.2 km	MPC · JPL
184841	2005 US_{38}	—	October 24, 2005	Kitt Peak	Spacewatch	·	3.7 km	MPC · JPL
184842	2005 UY_{38}	—	October 24, 2005	Kitt Peak	Spacewatch	HYG	4.8 km	MPC · JPL
184843	2005 UO_{42}	—	October 22, 2005	Kitt Peak	Spacewatch	·	4.6 km	MPC · JPL
184844	2005 UB_{45}	—	October 22, 2005	Kitt Peak	Spacewatch	·	2.6 km	MPC · JPL
184845	2005 UP_{45}	—	October 22, 2005	Catalina	CSS	·	3.4 km	MPC · JPL
184846	2005 UT_{45}	—	October 22, 2005	Catalina	CSS	·	2.1 km	MPC · JPL
184847	2005 UR_{46}	—	October 22, 2005	Catalina	CSS	KOR	2.1 km	MPC · JPL
184848	2005 UH_{49}	—	October 23, 2005	Catalina	CSS	·	7.3 km	MPC · JPL
184849	2005 UE_{51}	—	October 23, 2005	Catalina	CSS	·	2.8 km	MPC · JPL
184850	2005 UG_{53}	—	October 23, 2005	Catalina	CSS	·	5.7 km	MPC · JPL
184851	2005 UT_{53}	—	October 23, 2005	Catalina	CSS	·	2.4 km	MPC · JPL
184852	2005 UV_{53}	—	October 23, 2005	Catalina	CSS	·	3.1 km	MPC · JPL
184853	2005 UM_{56}	—	October 24, 2005	Kitt Peak	Spacewatch	·	3.3 km	MPC · JPL
184854	2005 UP_{57}	—	October 24, 2005	Anderson Mesa	LONEOS	·	3.5 km	MPC · JPL
184855	2005 UK_{58}	—	October 24, 2005	Kitt Peak	Spacewatch	·	3.6 km	MPC · JPL
184856	2005 UW_{61}	—	October 25, 2005	Mount Lemmon	Mount Lemmon Survey	·	3.6 km	MPC · JPL
184857	2005 UF_{66}	—	October 22, 2005	Catalina	CSS	3:2	9.4 km	MPC · JPL
184858	2005 UJ_{67}	—	October 22, 2005	Palomar	NEAT	·	3.1 km	MPC · JPL
184859	2005 UU_{72}	—	October 23, 2005	Palomar	NEAT	·	4.3 km	MPC · JPL
184860	2005 UD_{82}	—	October 22, 2005	Kitt Peak	Spacewatch	·	1.9 km	MPC · JPL
184861	2005 UY_{86}	—	October 22, 2005	Kitt Peak	Spacewatch	·	3.3 km	MPC · JPL
184862	2005 UU_{87}	—	October 22, 2005	Kitt Peak	Spacewatch	·	3.7 km	MPC · JPL
184863	2005 UQ_{89}	—	October 22, 2005	Kitt Peak	Spacewatch	EOS	3.7 km	MPC · JPL
184864	2005 UM_{95}	—	October 22, 2005	Kitt Peak	Spacewatch	·	3.0 km	MPC · JPL
184865	2005 UA_{96}	—	October 22, 2005	Kitt Peak	Spacewatch	·	3.5 km	MPC · JPL
184866	2005 UC_{97}	—	October 22, 2005	Kitt Peak	Spacewatch	·	4.0 km	MPC · JPL
184867	2005 UD_{109}	—	October 22, 2005	Palomar	NEAT	·	5.3 km	MPC · JPL
184868	2005 UJ_{113}	—	October 22, 2005	Kitt Peak	Spacewatch	KOR	1.5 km	MPC · JPL
184869	2005 UA_{115}	—	October 22, 2005	Palomar	NEAT	·	3.1 km	MPC · JPL
184870	2005 UB_{116}	—	October 23, 2005	Palomar	NEAT	·	2.3 km	MPC · JPL
184871	2005 UP_{127}	—	October 24, 2005	Kitt Peak	Spacewatch	·	3.3 km	MPC · JPL
184872	2005 UR_{128}	—	October 24, 2005	Kitt Peak	Spacewatch	3:2	6.0 km	MPC · JPL
184873	2005 UU_{140}	—	October 25, 2005	Mount Lemmon	Mount Lemmon Survey	(5)	1.8 km	MPC · JPL
184874	2005 UQ_{160}	—	October 22, 2005	Catalina	CSS	·	2.1 km	MPC · JPL
184875	2005 UP_{176}	—	October 24, 2005	Kitt Peak	Spacewatch	(13314)	2.5 km	MPC · JPL
184876	2005 UY_{178}	—	October 24, 2005	Kitt Peak	Spacewatch	HYG	3.8 km	MPC · JPL
184877	2005 US_{182}	—	October 24, 2005	Kitt Peak	Spacewatch	·	4.5 km	MPC · JPL
184878 Gotlib	2005 UK_{187}	Gotlib	October 26, 2005	Nogales	J.-C. Merlin	·	2.1 km	MPC · JPL
184879	2005 UL_{194}	—	October 22, 2005	Kitt Peak	Spacewatch	AGN	1.3 km	MPC · JPL
184880	2005 UE_{199}	—	October 25, 2005	Mount Lemmon	Mount Lemmon Survey	·	2.5 km	MPC · JPL
184881	2005 UR_{211}	—	October 27, 2005	Kitt Peak	Spacewatch	·	2.7 km	MPC · JPL
184882	2005 UZ_{212}	—	October 27, 2005	Mount Lemmon	Mount Lemmon Survey	·	3.7 km	MPC · JPL
184883	2005 UL_{213}	—	October 22, 2005	Palomar	NEAT	·	2.2 km	MPC · JPL
184884	2005 UF_{214}	—	October 24, 2005	Palomar	NEAT	·	2.1 km	MPC · JPL
184885	2005 UY_{214}	—	October 27, 2005	Palomar	NEAT	·	1.9 km	MPC · JPL
184886	2005 UT_{221}	—	October 25, 2005	Kitt Peak	Spacewatch	HYG	3.7 km	MPC · JPL
184887	2005 UO_{226}	—	October 25, 2005	Kitt Peak	Spacewatch	THM	2.6 km	MPC · JPL
184888	2005 UW_{226}	—	October 25, 2005	Kitt Peak	Spacewatch	·	5.1 km	MPC · JPL
184889	2005 UY_{234}	—	October 25, 2005	Kitt Peak	Spacewatch	·	4.9 km	MPC · JPL
184890	2005 UZ_{236}	—	October 25, 2005	Kitt Peak	Spacewatch	·	2.7 km	MPC · JPL
184891	2005 UM_{237}	—	October 25, 2005	Kitt Peak	Spacewatch	·	4.2 km	MPC · JPL
184892	2005 UB_{244}	—	October 25, 2005	Kitt Peak	Spacewatch	·	3.0 km	MPC · JPL
184893	2005 UN_{253}	—	October 27, 2005	Anderson Mesa	LONEOS	TEL	2.0 km	MPC · JPL
184894	2005 UO_{254}	—	October 22, 2005	Kitt Peak	Spacewatch	·	2.3 km	MPC · JPL
184895	2005 UO_{255}	—	October 24, 2005	Kitt Peak	Spacewatch	·	5.3 km	MPC · JPL
184896	2005 UO_{256}	—	October 25, 2005	Kitt Peak	Spacewatch	KOR	1.8 km	MPC · JPL
184897	2005 UV_{260}	—	October 25, 2005	Mount Lemmon	Mount Lemmon Survey	NEM	3.0 km	MPC · JPL
184898	2005 UA_{263}	—	October 27, 2005	Kitt Peak	Spacewatch	KOR	1.8 km	MPC · JPL
184899	2005 UF_{267}	—	October 27, 2005	Kitt Peak	Spacewatch	·	2.2 km	MPC · JPL
184900	2005 UZ_{269}	—	October 28, 2005	Mount Lemmon	Mount Lemmon Survey	EUN	2.2 km	MPC · JPL

== 184901–185000 ==
back to top

Designation			Discovery			Properties		Ref
Permanent	Provisional	Named after	Date	Site	Discoverer(s)	Category	Diam.	Ref
184901	2005 UK_{280}	—	October 24, 2005	Kitt Peak	Spacewatch	KOR	2.2 km	MPC · JPL
184902	2005 US_{296}	—	October 26, 2005	Kitt Peak	Spacewatch	VER	4.4 km	MPC · JPL
184903	2005 UW_{311}	—	October 29, 2005	Mount Lemmon	Mount Lemmon Survey	·	5.1 km	MPC · JPL
184904	2005 UK_{321}	—	October 27, 2005	Kitt Peak	Spacewatch	·	3.4 km	MPC · JPL
184905	2005 UX_{325}	—	October 29, 2005	Mount Lemmon	Mount Lemmon Survey	THM	3.4 km	MPC · JPL
184906	2005 UZ_{327}	—	October 30, 2005	Mount Lemmon	Mount Lemmon Survey	·	1.8 km	MPC · JPL
184907	2005 UR_{334}	—	October 29, 2005	Mount Lemmon	Mount Lemmon Survey	·	2.9 km	MPC · JPL
184908	2005 UL_{349}	—	October 25, 2005	Catalina	CSS	·	3.3 km	MPC · JPL
184909	2005 UQ_{353}	—	October 29, 2005	Catalina	CSS	EOS	3.1 km	MPC · JPL
184910	2005 UM_{363}	—	October 27, 2005	Kitt Peak	Spacewatch	·	2.7 km	MPC · JPL
184911	2005 UP_{365}	—	October 27, 2005	Kitt Peak	Spacewatch	·	4.8 km	MPC · JPL
184912	2005 UN_{382}	—	October 27, 2005	Socorro	LINEAR	·	2.7 km	MPC · JPL
184913	2005 UQ_{382}	—	October 27, 2005	Socorro	LINEAR	(45637) · CYB	5.7 km	MPC · JPL
184914	2005 UF_{389}	—	October 29, 2005	Mount Lemmon	Mount Lemmon Survey	KOR	1.6 km	MPC · JPL
184915	2005 UO_{402}	—	October 28, 2005	Catalina	CSS	AGN	1.9 km	MPC · JPL
184916	2005 UW_{407}	—	October 31, 2005	Mount Lemmon	Mount Lemmon Survey	KOR	1.7 km	MPC · JPL
184917	2005 UY_{468}	—	October 30, 2005	Kitt Peak	Spacewatch	·	3.4 km	MPC · JPL
184918	2005 UO_{472}	—	October 30, 2005	Kitt Peak	Spacewatch	·	3.0 km	MPC · JPL
184919	2005 UH_{485}	—	October 22, 2005	Catalina	CSS	PAD	2.4 km	MPC · JPL
184920	2005 UQ_{492}	—	October 25, 2005	Socorro	LINEAR	EOS	3.2 km	MPC · JPL
184921	2005 UV_{494}	—	October 25, 2005	Catalina	CSS	·	4.2 km	MPC · JPL
184922	2005 UP_{497}	—	October 27, 2005	Socorro	LINEAR	·	3.8 km	MPC · JPL
184923	2005 UN_{502}	—	October 30, 2005	Socorro	LINEAR	URS ·	7.4 km	MPC · JPL
184924	2005 UX_{508}	—	October 25, 2005	Catalina	CSS	HYG	4.9 km	MPC · JPL
184925	2005 UF_{511}	—	October 27, 2005	Anderson Mesa	LONEOS	·	3.1 km	MPC · JPL
184926	2005 UA_{518}	—	October 25, 2005	Apache Point	A. C. Becker	·	3.1 km	MPC · JPL
184927	2005 UZ_{523}	—	October 27, 2005	Apache Point	A. C. Becker	TIR	3.6 km	MPC · JPL
184928	2005 UL_{524}	—	October 27, 2005	Apache Point	A. C. Becker	·	3.6 km	MPC · JPL
184929	2005 VN_{2}	—	November 1, 2005	Kitt Peak	Spacewatch	L5	10 km	MPC · JPL
184930 Gobbihilda	2005 VU_{4}	Gobbihilda	November 4, 2005	Piszkéstető	K. Sárneczky	3:2	7.0 km	MPC · JPL
184931	2005 VZ_{4}	—	November 5, 2005	Kitt Peak	Spacewatch	·	2.5 km	MPC · JPL
184932	2005 VU_{16}	—	November 3, 2005	Catalina	CSS	(43176) ·	7.4 km	MPC · JPL
184933	2005 VK_{33}	—	November 1, 2005	Socorro	LINEAR	TEL	3.1 km	MPC · JPL
184934	2005 VD_{42}	—	November 3, 2005	Catalina	CSS	·	3.7 km	MPC · JPL
184935	2005 VY_{43}	—	November 3, 2005	Kitt Peak	Spacewatch	·	2.0 km	MPC · JPL
184936	2005 VZ_{44}	—	November 4, 2005	Kitt Peak	Spacewatch	·	3.7 km	MPC · JPL
184937	2005 VA_{87}	—	November 5, 2005	Kitt Peak	Spacewatch	L5	15 km	MPC · JPL
184938	2005 VA_{94}	—	November 6, 2005	Kitt Peak	Spacewatch	·	2.6 km	MPC · JPL
184939	2005 VP_{109}	—	November 6, 2005	Mount Lemmon	Mount Lemmon Survey	·	3.3 km	MPC · JPL
184940	2005 VB_{110}	—	November 6, 2005	Mount Lemmon	Mount Lemmon Survey	EOS	3.2 km	MPC · JPL
184941	2005 VM_{111}	—	November 6, 2005	Mount Lemmon	Mount Lemmon Survey	·	3.9 km	MPC · JPL
184942	2005 VP_{112}	—	November 8, 2005	Socorro	LINEAR	EOS	3.4 km	MPC · JPL
184943	2005 VX_{123}	—	November 12, 2005	Kitt Peak	Spacewatch	EOS	3.1 km	MPC · JPL
184944	2005 WR_{6}	—	November 21, 2005	Catalina	CSS	·	2.4 km	MPC · JPL
184945	2005 WK_{12}	—	November 22, 2005	Kitt Peak	Spacewatch	·	3.9 km	MPC · JPL
184946	2005 WU_{44}	—	November 22, 2005	Kitt Peak	Spacewatch	·	2.4 km	MPC · JPL
184947	2005 WS_{50}	—	November 25, 2005	Mount Lemmon	Mount Lemmon Survey	·	3.2 km	MPC · JPL
184948	2005 WM_{59}	—	November 29, 2005	Socorro	LINEAR	EOS	3.3 km	MPC · JPL
184949	2005 WG_{76}	—	November 25, 2005	Kitt Peak	Spacewatch	·	3.2 km	MPC · JPL
184950	2005 WT_{83}	—	November 26, 2005	Mount Lemmon	Mount Lemmon Survey	·	3.3 km	MPC · JPL
184951	2005 WH_{90}	—	November 28, 2005	Socorro	LINEAR	·	5.4 km	MPC · JPL
184952	2005 WG_{91}	—	November 28, 2005	Catalina	CSS	3:2	6.8 km	MPC · JPL
184953	2005 WL_{91}	—	November 28, 2005	Catalina	CSS	·	4.8 km	MPC · JPL
184954	2005 WA_{100}	—	November 28, 2005	Catalina	CSS	·	4.4 km	MPC · JPL
184955	2005 WZ_{101}	—	November 29, 2005	Socorro	LINEAR	3:2 · SHU	9.5 km	MPC · JPL
184956	2005 WC_{104}	—	November 28, 2005	Catalina	CSS	·	5.4 km	MPC · JPL
184957	2005 WS_{106}	—	November 25, 2005	Mount Lemmon	Mount Lemmon Survey	·	3.4 km	MPC · JPL
184958	2005 WR_{111}	—	November 30, 2005	Socorro	LINEAR	·	3.3 km	MPC · JPL
184959	2005 WW_{118}	—	November 25, 2005	Mount Lemmon	Mount Lemmon Survey	EOS	2.7 km	MPC · JPL
184960	2005 WP_{132}	—	November 25, 2005	Mount Lemmon	Mount Lemmon Survey	·	2.7 km	MPC · JPL
184961	2005 WY_{145}	—	November 25, 2005	Kitt Peak	Spacewatch	3:2 · SHU	5.6 km	MPC · JPL
184962	2005 WY_{151}	—	November 28, 2005	Catalina	CSS	·	2.5 km	MPC · JPL
184963	2005 WK_{156}	—	November 29, 2005	Palomar	NEAT	3:2	8.8 km	MPC · JPL
184964	2005 WA_{160}	—	November 30, 2005	Anderson Mesa	LONEOS	·	3.5 km	MPC · JPL
184965	2005 WX_{167}	—	November 30, 2005	Kitt Peak	Spacewatch	HYG	3.7 km	MPC · JPL
184966	2005 WM_{180}	—	November 21, 2005	Palomar	NEAT	·	4.9 km	MPC · JPL
184967	2005 WA_{182}	—	November 25, 2005	Catalina	CSS	·	2.9 km	MPC · JPL
184968	2005 WG_{182}	—	November 25, 2005	Catalina	CSS	VER	6.8 km	MPC · JPL
184969	2005 WN_{191}	—	November 22, 2005	Catalina	CSS	·	4.8 km	MPC · JPL
184970	2005 XF_{36}	—	December 4, 2005	Kitt Peak	Spacewatch	·	1.6 km	MPC · JPL
184971	2005 XJ_{92}	—	December 7, 2005	Socorro	LINEAR	·	6.8 km	MPC · JPL
184972	2005 YE_{1}	—	December 21, 2005	Kitt Peak	Spacewatch	·	4.0 km	MPC · JPL
184973	2005 YN_{8}	—	December 23, 2005	Palomar	NEAT	·	6.3 km	MPC · JPL
184974	2005 YH_{76}	—	December 24, 2005	Kitt Peak	Spacewatch	3:2	9.2 km	MPC · JPL
184975	2006 BZ_{30}	—	January 20, 2006	Kitt Peak	Spacewatch	L5	10 km	MPC · JPL
184976	2006 BN_{70}	—	January 23, 2006	Kitt Peak	Spacewatch	L5	10 km	MPC · JPL
184977	2006 BQ_{110}	—	January 25, 2006	Kitt Peak	Spacewatch	L5	12 km	MPC · JPL
184978	2006 BM_{121}	—	January 26, 2006	Mount Lemmon	Mount Lemmon Survey	L5	9.9 km	MPC · JPL
184979	2006 BG_{162}	—	January 26, 2006	Mount Lemmon	Mount Lemmon Survey	L5	10 km	MPC · JPL
184980	2006 BM_{213}	—	January 22, 2006	Catalina	CSS	L5	16 km	MPC · JPL
184981	2006 BK_{222}	—	January 30, 2006	Kitt Peak	Spacewatch	L5	10 km	MPC · JPL
184982	2006 BV_{252}	—	January 31, 2006	Kitt Peak	Spacewatch	L5	10 km	MPC · JPL
184983	2006 CS_{19}	—	February 1, 2006	Mount Lemmon	Mount Lemmon Survey	L5	11 km	MPC · JPL
184984	2006 CQ_{31}	—	February 2, 2006	Kitt Peak	Spacewatch	L5	10 km	MPC · JPL
184985	2006 CC_{51}	—	February 4, 2006	Kitt Peak	Spacewatch	L5	9.9 km	MPC · JPL
184986	2006 DW_{143}	—	February 25, 2006	Mount Lemmon	Mount Lemmon Survey	L5	9.9 km	MPC · JPL
184987	2006 DY_{157}	—	February 27, 2006	Kitt Peak	Spacewatch	·	1.7 km	MPC · JPL
184988	2006 FF_{12}	—	March 23, 2006	Catalina	CSS	L5	16 km	MPC · JPL
184989	2006 KA_{56}	—	May 21, 2006	Kitt Peak	Spacewatch	·	2.4 km	MPC · JPL
184990	2006 KE_{89}	—	May 28, 2006	Anderson Mesa	LONEOS	APO +1km	2.0 km	MPC · JPL
184991	2006 LZ_{6}	—	June 11, 2006	Palomar	NEAT	NYS	1.4 km	MPC · JPL
184992	2006 ML_{6}	—	June 20, 2006	Mount Lemmon	Mount Lemmon Survey	·	2.7 km	MPC · JPL
184993	2006 MA_{7}	—	June 18, 2006	Kitt Peak	Spacewatch	·	1.5 km	MPC · JPL
184994	2006 MD_{11}	—	June 20, 2006	Kitt Peak	Spacewatch	·	1.9 km	MPC · JPL
184995	2006 MT_{12}	—	June 22, 2006	Palomar	NEAT	·	3.6 km	MPC · JPL
184996	2006 OP_{6}	—	July 21, 2006	Mount Lemmon	Mount Lemmon Survey	THM	3.6 km	MPC · JPL
184997	2006 OQ_{6}	—	July 21, 2006	Mount Lemmon	Mount Lemmon Survey	·	1.3 km	MPC · JPL
184998	2006 OU_{11}	—	July 21, 2006	Mount Lemmon	Mount Lemmon Survey	·	3.1 km	MPC · JPL
184999	2006 PD	—	August 2, 2006	Pla D'Arguines	R. Ferrando	NYS	1.4 km	MPC · JPL
185000	2006 PY_{5}	—	August 12, 2006	Palomar	NEAT	·	6.2 km	MPC · JPL

back to top

== See also ==
- Meanings of minor-planet names: 184001–185000
