= Meanings of minor-planet names: 184001–185000 =

As minor planet discoveries are confirmed, they are given a permanent number by the IAU's Minor Planet Center (MPC), and the discoverers can then submit names for them, following the IAU's naming conventions. The list below concerns those minor planets in the specified number-range that have received names, and explains the meanings of those names.

Official naming citations of newly named small Solar System bodies are approved and published in a bulletin by IAU's Working Group for Small Bodies Nomenclature (WGSBN). Before May 2021, citations were published in MPC's Minor Planet Circulars for many decades. Recent citations can also be found on the JPL Small-Body Database (SBDB). Until his death in 2016, German astronomer Lutz D. Schmadel compiled these citations into the Dictionary of Minor Planet Names (DMP) and regularly updated the collection.

Based on Paul Herget's The Names of the Minor Planets, Schmadel also researched the unclear origin of numerous asteroids, most of which had been named prior to World War II. This article incorporates text from this source, which is in the public domain: SBDB New namings may only be added to this list below after official publication as the preannouncement of names is condemned. The WGSBN publishes a comprehensive guideline for the naming rules of non-cometary small Solar System bodies.

== 184001–184100 ==
Named minor planet	Provisional	This minor planet was named for...	Ref · Catalog
184011 Andypuckett	2004 FT_{4}	Andrew W. Puckett (born 1977), an American college professor dedicated to creating authentic astronomical research opportunities for undergraduates and other ambitious young students. He is a discoverer of minor planets.	JPL · 184011
184064 Miner	2004 GM	Ellis D. Miner (born 1937) was a JPL astronomer and scientist on the science teams of Mariner and Viking spacecraft, Assistant Project Scientist for Voyager 1 and Voyager 2, and the Science Manager for Cassini–Huygens. He determined the rotational rate for asteroid 1566 Icarus in 1968 at JPL's Table Mountain Observatory.	JPL · 184064
184096 Kazlauskas	2004 HB_{4}	Algirdas Kazlauskas (born 1949), Lithuanian astronomer and deputy director of the Institute of Theoretical Physics and Astronomy at Vilnius University	JPL · 184096

== 184101–184200 ==
back to top

Named minor planet	Provisional	This minor planet was named for...	Ref · Catalog
There are no named minor planets in this number range

== 184201–184300 ==
back to top

Named minor planet	Provisional	This minor planet was named for...	Ref · Catalog
184275 Laffra	2005 AX	Maurice Laffra (1886–1936) established the Orchestre Symphonique du Creusot in 1920 and served as its conductor during 1920–1922	JPL · 184275
184280 Yperion	2005 AQ_{47}	Hyperion (Yperion), from Greek mythology. The Trojan prince was one of the many sons of King Priam.	JPL · 184280

== 184301–184400 ==
back to top

Named minor planet	Provisional	This minor planet was named for...	Ref · Catalog
184314 Mbabamwanawaresa	2005 EO_{302}	Mbaba Mwana Waresa, supposedly meaning "Goddess of Rains" in an unidentified language. The name can be traced back at least to Merlin Stone (1979) Ancient Mirrors of Womanhood, a short telling of a supposedly Zulu myth, though the name does not correspond to anything in Zulu. (The multiple sources listed at the end of vol. II might shed some light on this.) The goddess in the actual Zulu myth is Nomkhubulwane, the goddess of agriculture and the harvest, and daughter of the rain god. She is also the goddess of rainbows, a symbol of the link between heaven and Earth. The IAU naming citation says she is said to be particularly revered for teaching people the art of making beer (umqombothi).	JPL · 184314
184315 Denisbogan	2005 EB_{314}	Denis J. Bogan (b. 1941), a former American NASA scientist.	IAU · 184315
184318 Fosanelli	2005 GC_{1}	Patrik Fosanelli (born 1945), an active French amateur astronomer, involved in spectroscopy research at the Osenbach Observatory (630) in France.	JPL · 184318

== 184401–184500 ==
back to top

Named minor planet	Provisional	This minor planet was named for...	Ref · Catalog
There are no named minor planets in this number range

== 184501–184600 ==
back to top

Named minor planet	Provisional	This minor planet was named for...	Ref · Catalog
184501 Pimprenelle	2005 PV_{5}	Caroline Christophe (born 1978), daughter of French amateur astronomer Bernard Christophe who discovered this minor planet. Her nickname, Pimprenelle, was a puppet character on the 1970s French television show Bonne nuit les petits	JPL · 184501
184508 Courroux	2005 PR_{16}	The Swiss village of Courroux, located near Delémont in the Jura Mountains	JPL · 184508
184535 Audouze	2005 QN_{30}	Jean Audouze (born 1940), French astrophysicist	JPL · 184535

== 184601–184700 ==
back to top

Named minor planet	Provisional	This minor planet was named for...	Ref · Catalog
184620 Pippobattaglia	2005 RA_{24}	Pippo Battaglia (born 1947), Italian science popularizer and author of numerous books on astronomy	JPL · 184620

== 184701–184800 ==
back to top

Named minor planet	Provisional	This minor planet was named for...	Ref · Catalog
184778 Kevinoberheim	2005 TL_{27}	Kevin Oberheim (born 1983) is a civil engineer in the State of Maryland. His work helps provide for safe and reliable travel for thousands of people every day.	JPL · 184778
184779 Bericoberheim	2005 TO_{27}	B. Eric Oberheim (born 1984) for his humanitarian efforts in Central America, and his continuing social work with non-governmental organizations.	JPL · 184779
184784 Bettiepage	2005 TZ_{41}	Bettie Page (1923–2008), an American model and actor who became known as The Queen of the Pin-ups.	JPL · 184784

== 184801–184900 ==
back to top

Named minor planet	Provisional	This minor planet was named for...	Ref · Catalog
184878 Gotlib	2005 UK_{187}	Marcel Gotlieb (1934–2016), a French cartoonist from Paris known for the comics magazines L'Écho des savanes and Fluide Glacial	JPL · 184878

== 184901–185000 ==
back to top

Named minor planet	Provisional	This minor planet was named for...	Ref · Catalog
184930 Gobbihilda	2005 VU_{4}	Hilda Gobbi (1913–1988), one of Hungary's most recognizable character actresses.	JPL · 184930

back to top

Preceded by 183,001–184,000	Meanings of minor-planet names List of minor planets: 184,001–185,000	Succeeded by 185,001–186,000
