= (184212) 2004 PB112 =

Trans-Neptunian object

(184212) 2004 PB_{112}
Discovery
- Discovered by: M. W. Buie
- Discovery site: Cerro Tololo Obs.
- Discovery date: 13 August 2004

Designations
- Minor planet category: TNO · SDO res 4:27

Orbital characteristics
- Epoch 1 July 2021 (JD 2459396.5)
- Uncertainty parameter 3 · 0
- Observation arc: 17.07 yr (6,236 d)
- Aphelion: 184.60 AU
- Perihelion: 35.333 AU
- Semi-major axis: 109.97 AU
- Eccentricity: 0.6787
- Orbital period (sidereal): 1153.20 yrs
- Mean anomaly: 3.0647°
- Mean motion: 0° 0^{m} 3.24^{s} / day
- Inclination: 15.403°
- Longitude of ascending node: 356.73°
- Argument of perihelion: 3.6578°

Physical characteristics
- Mean diameter: 154 km (est. at 0.09)
- Absolute magnitude (H): 7.3

(184212) 2004 PB_{112} is a trans-Neptunian object from the scattered disc, approximately 154 kilometers (96 miles) in diameter, and in a rare high-order orbital resonance ratio (4:27) with Neptune. It was discovered on 13 August 2004, by American astronomer Marc Buie at the Cerro Tololo Inter-American Observatory in Chile.

== Orbit and classification ==
2004 PB_{112} orbits the Sun at a distance of 35.3–184.6 AU once every 1153 years and 2 months (421,205 days; semi-major axis of 109.97 AU). Its orbit has a high eccentricity of 0.68 and an inclination of 15° with respect to the ecliptic. A first precovery was taken at Cerro Tololo in 2000, extending the body's observation arc by 4 years prior to its official discovery observation.

2004 PB_{112} reached perihelion on 5 October 2011 (JD 2455839.806). It has been classified as a highly unusual 4:27 resonant trans-Neptunian object, but also simply as a scattered disc object, or SCATNEAR, respectively, by the Deep Ecliptic Survey.

== Numbering and naming ==
This minor planet was numbered (184212) by the Minor Planet Center on 20 April 2008 (M.P.C. 62608). As of 2025, it has not been named.

== Physical characteristics ==
Based on a generic conversion from an absolute magnitude of 7.2, 2004 PB_{112} measures between 100 and 220 kilometer in diameter. Johnston's Archive estimates a mean diameter of 154 kilometers (96 miles) assuming a typical albedo of 0.09.
