= Meanings of minor-planet names: 55001–56000 =

As minor planet discoveries are confirmed, they are given a permanent number by the IAU's Minor Planet Center (MPC), and the discoverers can then submit names for them, following the IAU's naming conventions. The list below concerns those minor planets in the specified number-range that have received names, and explains the meanings of those names.

Official naming citations of newly named small Solar System bodies are approved and published in a bulletin by IAU's Working Group for Small Bodies Nomenclature (WGSBN). Before May 2021, citations were published in MPC's Minor Planet Circulars for many decades. Recent citations can also be found on the JPL Small-Body Database (SBDB). Until his death in 2016, German astronomer Lutz D. Schmadel compiled these citations into the Dictionary of Minor Planet Names (DMP) and regularly updated the collection.

Based on Paul Herget's The Names of the Minor Planets, Schmadel also researched the unclear origin of numerous asteroids, most of which had been named prior to World War II. This article incorporates text from this source, which is in the public domain: SBDB New namings may only be added to this list below after official publication as the preannouncement of names is condemned. The WGSBN publishes a comprehensive guideline for the naming rules of non-cometary small Solar System bodies.

== 55001–55100 ==
Named minor planet	Provisional	This minor planet was named for...	Ref; Catalog
55082 Xlendi	2001 QJ_{110}	Xlendi, Gozo, Malta †	MPC · 55082

== 55101–55200 ==
back to top

Named minor planet	Provisional	This minor planet was named for...	Ref; Catalog
55108 Beamueller	2001 QU_{142}	Beatrice E. A. Mueller, American astronomer	JPL · 55108
55112 Mariangela	2001 QQ_{153}	Maria Angels Gassol i Avante, wife of the discoverer	JPL · 55112
55196 Marchini	2001 RM_{16}	Alessandro Marchini, Italian computer scientist, astronomy popularizer, and director of the Astronomical Observatory of the University of Siena	JPL · 55196

== 55201–55300 ==
back to top

Named minor planet	Provisional	This minor planet was named for...	Ref; Catalog
55212 Yukitoayatsuji	2001 RG_{46}	Yukito Ayatsuji is the pen name of Naoyuki Uchida (born 1960), a Japanese writer of horror and mystery. He is one of the founders of the Honkaku Mystery Writers Club of Japan. He was one of the two winners of the 1992 Mystery Writers of Japan Award. His best-known works are The Decagon House Murders and (manga).	JPL · 55212
55221 Nancynoblitt	2001 RM_{63}	Nancy Noblitt (born 1951), a friend and loyal supporter of the Rose-Hulman Observatory, in Terre Haute, Indiana, where this asteroid was discovered.	JPL · 55221
55222 Makotoshinkai	2001 RP_{63}	Makoto Shinkai, born Makoto Niitsu (born 1973), is a Japanese author, manga artist, cinematographer, director and producer. His anime credits include 5 Centimeters per Second, The Garden of Words, Your Name, Weathering With You and Suzume.	JPL · 55222
55223 Akiraifukube	2001 RQ_{63}	Akira Ifukube (1914–2006) was a Japanese composer of film scores and classical music. He is best known for the music for the 1954 movie Gojira, also known in the West as Godzilla.	JPL · 55223
55276 Kenlarner	2001 SK_{10}	Ken Larner (born 1938), husband of Nancy (born 1943), an American exploration geophysicist with a distinguished career at Western Geophysical, an international oil exploration company, and the Colorado School of Mines, a public research University, where he directs the Center for Wave Phenomena (Src).	MPC · 55276

== 55301–55400 ==
back to top

Named minor planet	Provisional	This minor planet was named for...	Ref; Catalog
55319 Takanashi	2001 SK_{73}	Yasuharu Takanashi (born 1963) is a composer of music for video games and anime. Some of the films he has produced scores for include Shiki, Ikki Tousen, Naruto Shippuden, Fairy Tail and Sailor Moon Crystal.	JPL · 55319
55320 Busler	2001 SL_{73}	William J. Busler (born 1944) has had a long and distinguished career as a researcher and teacher in the field of biochemistry. He has also been a planetarium director and has had a lifelong love for teaching fellow amateur astronomers about the universe.	JPL · 55320
55330 Shekwaihung	2001 SD_{114}	Shekwaihung (born 1991), gymnast who won gold in the vault event at the 2014 Asian Games.	JPL · 55330
55331 Putzi	2001 SY_{115}	Antonie ("Putzi") T. Schwartz, American mother, artist and holistic health practitioner	JPL · 55331
55381 Lautakwah	2001 SX_{264}	Andy Lau (born 1961) is a Hong Kong actor, singer and film producer. Lau was entered into the Guinness World Records for the `Most Awards Won by a Cantopop Male Artist' with a total unprecedented 292 awards won by year 2000. In 1999, he was also awarded the Ten Outstanding Young Persons of the World.	JPL · 55381
55382 Kootinlok	2001 SS_{265}	Louis Koo (born 1970) is a Hong Kong actor and film producer. He started his career in television and won TVB's Best Actor award in both 1999 and 2001. Koo is one of the most popular and talented actors of the Hong Kong film industry. He is also a low-key donor who had helped build close to 100 schools in China.	JPL · 55382
55383 Cheungkwokwing	2001 SX_{266}	Leslie Cheung (1956–2003) was a leading Hong Kong singer and actor, with charisma comparable to James Dean. Cheung won the 1991 Hong Kong Film Award for best actor.	JPL · 55383
55384 Muiyimfong	2001 SQ_{267}	Anita Mui (1963–2003) was a Hong Kong singer and actress who made great contributions to the Cantopop music scene and received numerous awards and honors. She remained an idol throughout most of her career, and was generally regarded as a Cantopop diva.	JPL · 55384
55397 Hackman	2001 SY_{288}	Gene Hackman (1930–2025) was an American actor and novelist. He won an Academy Award for Best Actor for the 1971 movie The French Connection and an Academy Award for Best Supporting Actor in the 1992 movie Unforgiven. With Daniel Lenihan, he has written three historical fiction novels and also two solo novels.	JPL · 55397
55399 Jasonsoderblom	2001 SQ_{291}	Jason Matthew Soderblom (b. 1977), an American Research Scientist at the Massachusetts Institute of Technology.	IAU · 55399

== 55401–55500 ==
back to top

Named minor planet	Provisional	This minor planet was named for...	Ref; Catalog
55418 Bianciardi	2001 TJ_{17}	Giorgio Bianciardi, researcher at the University of Siena	JPL · 55418
55419 Astynoos	2001 TF_{19}	Astynoos, the son of Portiaon was a Trojan warrior mentioned in Homer’s Iliad. He was charged by Polydamas to hold the horses from Cleitus’ driverless chariot.	IAU · 55419
55427 Rosta	2001 TF_{47}	Rosta is an ancient Italian municipality in Piedmont.	IAU · 55427
55428 Cappellaro	2001 TN_{47}	Enrico Cappellaro, Italian chief astronomer of the Istituto Nazionale di Astrofisica (National Institute for Astrophysics) and director of the Osservatorio Astronomico di Padova (Padua Astronomical Observatory)	JPL · 55428
55477 Soroban	2001 UC_{1}	Soroban, the Japanese abacus † ‡	MPC · 55477

== 55501–55600 ==
back to top

Named minor planet	Provisional	This minor planet was named for...	Ref; Catalog
55543 Nemeghaire	2001 XN_{16}	Jean Nemeghaire, Belgian assistant at the Royal Meteorological Institute of Belgium, the discoverer's physics teacher	JPL · 55543
55555 DNA	2001 YR_{2}	DNA, deoxyribonucleic acid	JPL · 55555
55559 Briancraine	2001 YS_{110}	Brian L. Craine (born 1951) is molecular biologist, physician and inventor. He has been an active research scientist for over 45 years, and holds multiple patents for medical devices and innovative biotechnology protocols. He has also made significant contributions to the discovery and characterization of variable stars.	JPL · 55559
55561 Madenberg	2002 AF_{9}	Janet A. Stevens (née Madenberg, born 1950), an American amateur astronomer and discoverer of minor planets who started a loaner telescope program in 1984 to introduce novices to telescopic observing. She co-edited Northern Lights from 1990 to 1998 and was executive secretary of the Astronomical League from 1995 to 2001. She directs the Desert Moon Observatory together with her husband Berton L. Stevens	MPC · 55561
55565 Aya	2002 AW_{197}	Aya is the goddess of the dawn in Akkadian mythology.	IAU · 55565
55576 Amycus	2002 GB_{10}	The centaur Amycus, son of Ophion, who attended Pirithous' wedding, fought against the Lapiths, and was killed by Pelates of Pella	JPL · 55576

== 55601–55700 ==
back to top

Named minor planet	Provisional	This minor planet was named for...	Ref; Catalog
55637 Uni	2002 UX_{25}	Uni, Etruscan goddess of love and fertility.	IAU · 55637
55676 Klythios	3034 T-1	Klythios (Clytius), one of the Elders of Troy (Iliad, Book III)	JPL · 55676
55678 Lampos	3291 T-1	Lampos or Lampus, son of Laomedon, one of the Elders of the city of Troy, father of Dolops	JPL · 55678

== 55701–55800 ==
back to top

Named minor planet	Provisional	This minor planet was named for...	Ref; Catalog
55701 Ukalegon	1193 T-3	Ucalegon, from Greek mythology, one of the Elders of Troy, whose house was set on fire by the Achaeans when they sacked the city	JPL · 55701
55702 Thymoitos	1302 T-3	Thymoetes (Thymoitos), from Greek mythology, son of Laomedon, one of the Elders of the city of Troy, and the first to urge that the Trojan Horse be brought into the city	JPL · 55702
55720 Daandehoop	1972 RE	Daniël "Daan" de Hoop (born 1945), honorary member and chairman of the Dutch Association for Spaceflight (1995–2005). He made many valuable contributions to the public understanding of spaceflight and space exploration.	JPL · 55720
55733 Lepsius	1986 WS_{2}	Karl Richard Lepsius (1810–1884), a German egyptologist who studied the monuments, pyramids and mastabas of the Old Kingdom (c. 2686-c. 2160 BC) in Egypt and Sudan. He did much to catalogue archaeological remains and to establish a chronology for Egyptian history.	JPL · 55733
55735 Magdeburg	1987 QV	The German city of Magdeburg, the capital of Saxony-Anhalt. It was first recorded in 805 and is situated on the Elbe river. Magdeburg became important under emperor Otto I, who founded a cathedral there.	JPL · 55735
55737 Coquimbo	1988 CQ_{1}	The Chilean city of Coquimbo, the capital of the Elqui province, located on the Pan American Highway. The natural harbor in Coquimbo was taken over by Pedro de Valdivia in 1550, together with the gold and copper industry in the region.	JPL · 55737
55749 Eulenspiegel	1991 AT_{2}	Till Eulenspiegel, a folklore character of Middle Low German oral tradition who lived in the fourteenth century in northern Germany. Many odd anecdotes, tricks and jests are connected with him. They became the source of numerous folk and literary tales translated into several languages.	JPL · 55749
55753 Raman	1991 RF_{5}	C. V. Raman (1888–1970), an Indian physicist who showed the inelastic scattering of photons traversing a material. For his discovery of the so-called Raman scattering he received the 1930 Nobel Prize in physics. The Raman spectroscopy helps to study atomic and complicated molecular structures.	JPL · 55753
55755 Blythe	1991 TB_{15}	Blythe Andra Lowe, a Canadian geologist and wife of amateur astronomer Andrew Lowe who discovered this minor planet	MPC · 55755
55759 Erdmannsdorff	1991 XJ_{1}	Friedrich Wilhelm von Erdmannsdorff (1736–1800), German architect and representative of the German early Classical style. He built the Wörlitz and Dessau castles of the principality of Anhalt. He also participated in the interior design of Prussian residences in Berlin and Potsdam (Sanssouci).	JPL · 55759
55772 Loder	1992 YB_{5}	Justus Christian Loder (1753–1832) was one of the most distinguished German anatomists of his time and wrote several textbooks. He founded the first maternity hospital in Jena. He maintained close relations with Goethe.	JPL · 55772

== 55801–55900 ==
back to top

Named minor planet	Provisional	This minor planet was named for...	Ref; Catalog
55810 Fabiofazio	1994 TC	Fabio Fazio (born 1964) an Italian public service broadcaster at RAI who debuted in October 1983. Beginning in 2003 he has been conducting a talk show with scientists, writers and other celebrities.	JPL · 55810
55815 Melindakim	1994 YU_{2}	Melinda Kim Dowling (née Steel, born 1958), younger sister of Duncan Steel who discovered this minor planet. A businesswoman who lives in Midsomer Norton, Somerset, she has been very supportive of the discoverer's career.	JPL · 55815
55838 Hagongda	1996 LN	The Harbin Institute of Technology, a key national university in China. Founded in 1920, it is prestigious in astronautics and other high-technology fields. This multi-disciplinary excellence has enabled it to make significant contributions in Chinese space programs.	JPL · 55838
55844 Bičák	1996 RN_{2}	Jiří Bičák (born 1942), a Czech professor of theoretical physics at Charles University in Prague. His expertise includes several topics in classical and quantum theory of general relativity, as well as their applications in astrophysics. The name was suggested by D. Vokrouhlický.	JPL · 55844
55845 Marco	1996 RO_{2}	Marco Colombini (born 1990), an Economics and Commerce graduate of the University of Modena, is employed at a metalworking company. He is the third son of one of co-discoverers of this minor planet.	IAU · 55845
55854 Stoppani	1996 VS_{1}	Eugenio Stoppani (1850–1917) who erected a mountain refuge in 1905, which is now the site of the Sormano Astronomical Observatory, in the place where his father Edoardo Stoppani (1818–1892) died accidentally. Antonio Stoppani (1824–1891) (probably a distant relative) was a distinguished paleontologist.	JPL · 55854
55863 Jeffwayne	1997 OM_{2}	Jeff Wayne (born 1943), American composer, musician and lyricist.	JPL · 55863
55866 Javiersierra	1997 PV_{4}	Javier Sierra Albert, a Spanish writer.	IAU · 55866
55873 Shiomidake	1997 UP_{7}	Shiomidake, a mountain in northern Shizuoka, Japan, about 3047 meters high.	JPL · 55873
55874 Brlka	1997 UL_{9}	Petr Brlka (1945–1966), a Czech amateur astronomer, was a member since 1959 and from 1963 the chairman of the Meteor Observers Group in Brno. A student of mathematics and physics in Brno University, he died in an avalanche in the Vysoke Tatry Mountains in Slovakia.	MPC · 55874
55875 Hirohatagaoka	1997 VH	Hirohatagaoka, a hill on which is located Hadano High School, from which the discoverer graduated (img)	MPC · 55875
55891 Jameslequeux	1997 XF_{3}	James Lequeux, French astronomer	IAU · 55891
55892 Fuzhougezhi	1997 XQ_{5}	The Fuzhou Gezhi High School (Ge Zhi means "Science") in China has made outstanding contributions to national education in China during the 160 years since its foundation in 1846.	JPL · 55892
55897 Antoinecailleau	1998 AH_{6}	Antoine Cailleau, French mechanical technician.	IAU · 55897

== 55901–56000 ==
back to top

Named minor planet	Provisional	This minor planet was named for...	Ref; Catalog
55901 Xuaoao	1998 CL_{2}	Xu Aoao (born 1940) is a solar-physics astronomer and educator. As Vice President of Nanjing University and President of the Macau University of Science and Technology, he made significant contributions to promoting the education and research of the universities.	JPL · 55901
55913 Alinedupin	1998 AH_{6}	Aline Dupin de la Gueriviere, French network engineer.	IAU · 55913
55987 Maríaruiz	1998 SO_{27}	María Teresa Ruiz, Chilean astronomer.	IAU · 55987
56000 Mesopotamia	1998 SN_{144}	Mesopotamia, cradle of human civilization	JPL · 56000

back to top

Preceded by 54,001–55,000	Meanings of minor-planet names List of minor planets: 55,001–56,000	Succeeded by 56,001–57,000
