= Fuzhou Gezhi High School =

Coordinates: 26.079985°N 119.306526°E

Location
- 41st Fahai Road, Gulou District, Fuzhou, Fujian, P.R. China, 350005

Information
- Former name: Fuzhou No.5 High School/Foochow College
- Type: Public School
- Motto: 格物致知 明德致远
- Established: 1847
- School district: Gulou
- President: Mr. Wang Enqi
- Principal: Mr. Xu Cong
- Staff: 169
- Grades: Grade 10 to Grade 12
- Enrollment: 1980
- Campus: Aofeng Campus/ Yushan(Fahai) Campus/ Gushan Campus/ Baofu Campus/ Xihong Campus
- Newspaper: Green Olive/ Zhuohua Times
- Affiliation: None
- Website: gezhi.fj.cn

Fuzhou Gezhi High School (Chinese: 福州格致中学; pinyin: Fúzhōu Gézhì Zhōngxué), also referred to as Gezhi, is a comprehensive three-year public high school located in the centre of Fuzhou City at the north foot of Mount Yu, enrolling 1980 students in grades 10 through 12. The school, established by Justus Doolittle, an ABCFM missionary, in 1847, is one of the oldest high schools in China supported by a foreign church. Spanning over 33380 square meters, Gezhi has the second largest campus among all high schools in Fuzhou, after Fuzhou No.1 Middle School.

== Curriculum ==
Credits are granted for most of the courses and are essential for the graduation of Gezhi students. Students in Grade 10 have to take all main courses including Chinese Literature, Mathematics, English, Chemistry, Physics, Biology, History, Geography, Politics and some of the subordinate courses including General Technology, Information Technology, Music, P.E and Fine Arts. As soon as they enter Grade 11, students can choose one subject between Physics and History, and two subjects from Chemistry, Biology, Politics and Geography. Once the choice is made, students will no longer have to earn credits for the opposite set of courses, and those three courses won't be in their National Higher Education Entrance Examination, or Gaokao. Also, at the end of Grade 10, students ranking among the top of the same grader will be selected into advanced experimental classes, which offer the most demanding courses at Gezhi.

A typical Gezhi student takes eight 45-minute classes a day, five days a week for 16 weeks a semester, 2 semesters a year. The exact numbers of school days each week and school weeks each semester may vary depending on the date of Chinese holidays every year.

Advanced Placement courses and Honor classes are not available at Fuzhou Gezhi High School.

== Extracurricular activities ==
=== Clubs ===
Students participate in a variety of extracurricular activities in Fuzhou Gezhi High School, though it was not until the first semester of 2011 to 2012 that participation in these activities became required for all students. Since September 2011, credits are granted for club activities including the following:

Model UN Club	Drama Club
Music Club	Astronomy Club
Investment Club	Photography Club

Fuzhou Gezhi High School is famous for its orchestra and sports teams. Gezhi has the best high school table tennis players and basketball players in Fuzhou. Gezhi is a member of Fujian Astronomy Society. The school, having one of the most advanced observatories in Fuzhou, is famous for its long history of astronomical observations and its frequent participation in local amateur activities. However, its astronomy society is sometimes blamed for its weak awareness of developments and frivolity in academic areas.

=== The student council ===
The student council was first established in the early 1990s but was cancelled around the year 1995. It was reformed in 2008 and currently has 12 departments/branches as follow:

- The President
- General Branch of the Communist Youth League of Fuzhou Gezhi High School
- Department of Interscholastic Affairs
- Department of Publicity
- Department of Information Technology
- Department of Athletics
- Department of Labor and Discipline
- The School Radio Station (The Sound of Gezhi)
- The Press Corps
- Department of Clubs
- Department of Entertainment
- Department of Organization
- Department of Technical

== Notable alumni ==
- Chen Shaokuan (陈绍宽), Commander-in-Chief of the Navy of the Republic of China, former Vice-Gonverner of Fujian Province, Class of 1932 (transferred to Jiangnan Institution of Navy in 1931)
- Wang Shizhen (王世真), nuclear medical scientist, Class of 1933
- Chen Yi (陈懿), chemist, academician of Chinese Academy of Sciences, Class of 1951
- Liu Yingming (刘应明), mathematician, academician of Chinese Academy of Sciences, Class of 1954
- Chen Jiansheng (陈建生), astronomer, academician of Chinese Academy of Sciences, chief of a research group which discovered asteroid 55892 Fuzhougezhi, Class of 1957
- Chen Jingming (陈镜明), geographer, academician of Chinese Academy of Science of the Royal Society of Canada, Class of 1974
- Zhao Linbin (赵麟斌), Vice-Principal of Minjiang University, Class of 1974
- Xu Deqing (徐德清), Professor at Harvard University, Class of 1979

== Honors ==
- Asteroid: 55892 Fuzhougezhi (1997 XQ5) (福州格致星)

== Campuses ==
Apart from the main campus of Fuzhou Gezhi High School in Gulou District, Fuzhou, Gezhi has a branch in Jin'an District, Fuzhou, which offers grade 7 through 12. A New Campus in Baofu Road, Gulou District, Fuzhou came into use in September 2019, which is used as the junior high school department (offers grade 7 through 9) of Fuzhou Gezhi High School. In June 2020, Gezhi took over Fuzhou No.22 Middle school, following an arrangement of the education authority of Fuzhou. The school is renamed as the Xihong Campus of Fuzhou Gezhi High School, offers grade 7 through 9.
