= List of minor planets: 55001–56000 =

The following is a partial list of minor planets, running from minor-planet number 55001 through 56000, inclusive. The primary data for this and other partial lists is based on JPL's "Small-Body Orbital Elements" and data available from the Minor Planet Center. Critical list information is also provided by the MPC, unless otherwise specified from Lowell Observatory. A detailed description of the table's columns and additional sources are given on the main page including a complete list of every page in this series, and a statistical break-up on the dynamical classification of minor planets.

Also see the summary list of all named bodies in numerical and alphabetical order, and the corresponding naming citations for the number range of this particular list. New namings may only be added to this list after official publication, as the preannouncement of names is condemned by the Working Group for Small Bodies Nomenclature of the International Astronomical Union.

Near-Earth obj.	MBA (inner)	MBA (outer)	Centaur
Mars-crosser	MBA (middle)	Jupiter trojan	Trans-Neptunian obj.
Unclassified

== 55001–55100 ==
Designation			Discovery			Properties		Ref
Permanent	Provisional	Named after	Date	Site	Discoverer(s)	Category	Diam.	Ref
55001	2001 QW_{18}	—	August 16, 2001	Socorro	LINEAR	THM	6.9 km	MPC · JPL
55002	2001 QF_{19}	—	August 16, 2001	Socorro	LINEAR	KOR	4.1 km	MPC · JPL
55003	2001 QV_{21}	—	August 16, 2001	Socorro	LINEAR	EOS	6.9 km	MPC · JPL
55004	2001 QT_{22}	—	August 16, 2001	Socorro	LINEAR	KOR	4.9 km	MPC · JPL
55005	2001 QQ_{23}	—	August 16, 2001	Socorro	LINEAR	·	2.6 km	MPC · JPL
55006	2001 QZ_{24}	—	August 16, 2001	Socorro	LINEAR	·	11 km	MPC · JPL
55007	2001 QC_{26}	—	August 16, 2001	Socorro	LINEAR	HYG	8.3 km	MPC · JPL
55008	2001 QW_{26}	—	August 16, 2001	Socorro	LINEAR	·	6.2 km	MPC · JPL
55009	2001 QZ_{26}	—	August 16, 2001	Socorro	LINEAR	·	6.1 km	MPC · JPL
55010	2001 QD_{27}	—	August 16, 2001	Socorro	LINEAR	·	1.9 km	MPC · JPL
55011	2001 QV_{29}	—	August 16, 2001	Socorro	LINEAR	KOR	3.9 km	MPC · JPL
55012	2001 QG_{30}	—	August 16, 2001	Socorro	LINEAR	EOS	7.4 km	MPC · JPL
55013	2001 QB_{31}	—	August 16, 2001	Socorro	LINEAR	(5)	4.9 km	MPC · JPL
55014	2001 QC_{31}	—	August 16, 2001	Socorro	LINEAR	EUN	4.4 km	MPC · JPL
55015	2001 QQ_{31}	—	August 16, 2001	Socorro	LINEAR	·	7.2 km	MPC · JPL
55016	2001 QE_{32}	—	August 17, 2001	Socorro	LINEAR	·	5.2 km	MPC · JPL
55017	2001 QH_{32}	—	August 17, 2001	Socorro	LINEAR	·	6.8 km	MPC · JPL
55018	2001 QH_{33}	—	August 16, 2001	Palomar	NEAT	·	5.0 km	MPC · JPL
55019	2001 QO_{34}	—	August 16, 2001	Socorro	LINEAR	·	2.9 km	MPC · JPL
55020	2001 QS_{34}	—	August 16, 2001	Socorro	LINEAR	AGN	2.9 km	MPC · JPL
55021	2001 QK_{38}	—	August 16, 2001	Socorro	LINEAR	·	4.4 km	MPC · JPL
55022	2001 QQ_{38}	—	August 16, 2001	Socorro	LINEAR	NYS	3.2 km	MPC · JPL
55023	2001 QV_{38}	—	August 16, 2001	Socorro	LINEAR	V	1.9 km	MPC · JPL
55024	2001 QB_{40}	—	August 16, 2001	Socorro	LINEAR	·	2.8 km	MPC · JPL
55025	2001 QF_{40}	—	August 16, 2001	Socorro	LINEAR	KOR	3.4 km	MPC · JPL
55026	2001 QG_{41}	—	August 16, 2001	Socorro	LINEAR	·	4.3 km	MPC · JPL
55027	2001 QL_{42}	—	August 16, 2001	Socorro	LINEAR	THM	9.4 km	MPC · JPL
55028	2001 QO_{42}	—	August 16, 2001	Socorro	LINEAR	·	4.0 km	MPC · JPL
55029	2001 QN_{45}	—	August 16, 2001	Socorro	LINEAR	·	3.5 km	MPC · JPL
55030	2001 QP_{45}	—	August 16, 2001	Socorro	LINEAR	·	4.8 km	MPC · JPL
55031	2001 QJ_{47}	—	August 16, 2001	Socorro	LINEAR	NYS	3.1 km	MPC · JPL
55032	2001 QX_{47}	—	August 16, 2001	Socorro	LINEAR	·	3.5 km	MPC · JPL
55033	2001 QT_{48}	—	August 16, 2001	Socorro	LINEAR	·	3.7 km	MPC · JPL
55034	2001 QA_{49}	—	August 16, 2001	Socorro	LINEAR	NYS	1.9 km	MPC · JPL
55035	2001 QP_{51}	—	August 16, 2001	Socorro	LINEAR	EOS	5.8 km	MPC · JPL
55036	2001 QQ_{51}	—	August 16, 2001	Socorro	LINEAR	MIS	4.8 km	MPC · JPL
55037	2001 QT_{51}	—	August 16, 2001	Socorro	LINEAR	·	8.7 km	MPC · JPL
55038	2001 QP_{52}	—	August 16, 2001	Socorro	LINEAR	·	2.2 km	MPC · JPL
55039	2001 QK_{54}	—	August 16, 2001	Socorro	LINEAR	·	4.0 km	MPC · JPL
55040	2001 QE_{56}	—	August 16, 2001	Socorro	LINEAR	·	3.3 km	MPC · JPL
55041	2001 QD_{57}	—	August 16, 2001	Socorro	LINEAR	·	2.7 km	MPC · JPL
55042	2001 QX_{58}	—	August 17, 2001	Socorro	LINEAR	·	3.9 km	MPC · JPL
55043	2001 QL_{59}	—	August 18, 2001	Socorro	LINEAR	·	4.4 km	MPC · JPL
55044	2001 QZ_{59}	—	August 18, 2001	Socorro	LINEAR	·	3.2 km	MPC · JPL
55045	2001 QH_{62}	—	August 16, 2001	Socorro	LINEAR	(5)	3.5 km	MPC · JPL
55046	2001 QQ_{64}	—	August 16, 2001	Socorro	LINEAR	·	3.9 km	MPC · JPL
55047	2001 QX_{65}	—	August 17, 2001	Socorro	LINEAR	·	5.7 km	MPC · JPL
55048	2001 QK_{66}	—	August 17, 2001	Socorro	LINEAR	·	2.0 km	MPC · JPL
55049	2001 QJ_{67}	—	August 18, 2001	Socorro	LINEAR	EUN	3.8 km	MPC · JPL
55050	2001 QU_{67}	—	August 19, 2001	Socorro	LINEAR	·	1.6 km	MPC · JPL
55051	2001 QT_{68}	—	August 20, 2001	Oakley	Wolfe, C.	·	4.9 km	MPC · JPL
55052	2001 QU_{68}	—	August 20, 2001	Oakley	Wolfe, C.	·	6.5 km	MPC · JPL
55053	2001 QV_{68}	—	August 20, 2001	Oakley	Wolfe, C.	·	3.4 km	MPC · JPL
55054	2001 QH_{69}	—	August 17, 2001	Socorro	LINEAR	·	1.7 km	MPC · JPL
55055	2001 QR_{69}	—	August 17, 2001	Socorro	LINEAR	MRX	3.2 km	MPC · JPL
55056	2001 QU_{69}	—	August 17, 2001	Socorro	LINEAR	MAR	3.4 km	MPC · JPL
55057	2001 QJ_{70}	—	August 17, 2001	Socorro	LINEAR	·	10 km	MPC · JPL
55058	2001 QC_{73}	—	August 19, 2001	Socorro	LINEAR	·	2.8 km	MPC · JPL
55059	2001 QG_{73}	—	August 19, 2001	Socorro	LINEAR	·	14 km	MPC · JPL
55060	2001 QM_{73}	—	August 19, 2001	Socorro	LINEAR	L5	29 km	MPC · JPL
55061	2001 QK_{74}	—	August 16, 2001	Socorro	LINEAR	·	4.1 km	MPC · JPL
55062	2001 QU_{77}	—	August 16, 2001	Socorro	LINEAR	·	5.0 km	MPC · JPL
55063	2001 QS_{78}	—	August 16, 2001	Socorro	LINEAR	EUN	4.7 km	MPC · JPL
55064	2001 QP_{80}	—	August 17, 2001	Socorro	LINEAR	EOS	5.4 km	MPC · JPL
55065	2001 QY_{80}	—	August 17, 2001	Socorro	LINEAR	·	2.6 km	MPC · JPL
55066	2001 QF_{81}	—	August 17, 2001	Socorro	LINEAR	·	5.3 km	MPC · JPL
55067	2001 QQ_{81}	—	August 17, 2001	Socorro	LINEAR	·	3.6 km	MPC · JPL
55068	2001 QX_{83}	—	August 17, 2001	Socorro	LINEAR	·	11 km	MPC · JPL
55069	2001 QR_{85}	—	August 20, 2001	Socorro	LINEAR	·	3.6 km	MPC · JPL
55070	2001 QZ_{85}	—	August 22, 2001	Desert Eagle	W. K. Y. Yeung	·	4.2 km	MPC · JPL
55071	2001 QE_{86}	—	August 18, 2001	Palomar	NEAT	·	6.0 km	MPC · JPL
55072	2001 QK_{89}	—	August 16, 2001	Palomar	NEAT	·	5.4 km	MPC · JPL
55073	2001 QY_{92}	—	August 22, 2001	Socorro	LINEAR	·	4.6 km	MPC · JPL
55074	2001 QH_{93}	—	August 22, 2001	Socorro	LINEAR	·	8.1 km	MPC · JPL
55075	2001 QP_{96}	—	August 16, 2001	Socorro	LINEAR	·	2.7 km	MPC · JPL
55076	2001 QQ_{96}	—	August 16, 2001	Socorro	LINEAR	EUN	4.1 km	MPC · JPL
55077	2001 QP_{98}	—	August 19, 2001	Socorro	LINEAR	·	4.9 km	MPC · JPL
55078	2001 QB_{101}	—	August 20, 2001	Palomar	NEAT	EUN	3.6 km	MPC · JPL
55079	2001 QM_{103}	—	August 19, 2001	Socorro	LINEAR	·	1.9 km	MPC · JPL
55080	2001 QM_{104}	—	August 21, 2001	Socorro	LINEAR	GEF	4.4 km	MPC · JPL
55081	2001 QP_{109}	—	August 21, 2001	Palomar	NEAT	·	3.1 km	MPC · JPL
55082 Xlendi	2001 QJ_{110}	Xlendi	August 25, 2001	Kleť	J. Tichá, M. Tichý	·	2.8 km	MPC · JPL
55083	2001 QV_{110}	—	August 24, 2001	Ondřejov	P. Kušnirák, P. Pravec	TEL	5.7 km	MPC · JPL
55084	2001 QE_{115}	—	August 17, 2001	Socorro	LINEAR	EOS	5.0 km	MPC · JPL
55085	2001 QL_{115}	—	August 17, 2001	Socorro	LINEAR	V	2.2 km	MPC · JPL
55086	2001 QQ_{117}	—	August 17, 2001	Socorro	LINEAR	RAF	3.4 km	MPC · JPL
55087	2001 QB_{120}	—	August 18, 2001	Socorro	LINEAR	·	3.5 km	MPC · JPL
55088	2001 QV_{120}	—	August 19, 2001	Socorro	LINEAR	·	5.0 km	MPC · JPL
55089	2001 QD_{121}	—	August 19, 2001	Socorro	LINEAR	·	3.9 km	MPC · JPL
55090	2001 QX_{121}	—	August 19, 2001	Socorro	LINEAR	V	1.7 km	MPC · JPL
55091	2001 QT_{122}	—	August 19, 2001	Socorro	LINEAR	·	4.6 km	MPC · JPL
55092	2001 QO_{123}	—	August 19, 2001	Socorro	LINEAR	·	1.6 km	MPC · JPL
55093	2001 QZ_{123}	—	August 19, 2001	Socorro	LINEAR	·	3.0 km	MPC · JPL
55094	2001 QS_{127}	—	August 20, 2001	Socorro	LINEAR	ADE	5.1 km	MPC · JPL
55095	2001 QZ_{129}	—	August 20, 2001	Socorro	LINEAR	·	4.7 km	MPC · JPL
55096	2001 QB_{132}	—	August 20, 2001	Socorro	LINEAR	V	1.8 km	MPC · JPL
55097	2001 QT_{132}	—	August 20, 2001	Socorro	LINEAR	EOS	6.0 km	MPC · JPL
55098	2001 QS_{133}	—	August 21, 2001	Socorro	LINEAR	·	12 km	MPC · JPL
55099	2001 QK_{137}	—	August 22, 2001	Socorro	LINEAR	·	12 km	MPC · JPL
55100	2001 QM_{137}	—	August 22, 2001	Socorro	LINEAR	·	11 km	MPC · JPL

== 55101–55200 ==
back to top

Designation			Discovery			Properties		Ref
Permanent	Provisional	Named after	Date	Site	Discoverer(s)	Category	Diam.	Ref
55101	2001 QW_{137}	—	August 22, 2001	Socorro	LINEAR	JUN	2.7 km	MPC · JPL
55102	2001 QX_{137}	—	August 22, 2001	Socorro	LINEAR	V	3.1 km	MPC · JPL
55103	2001 QE_{138}	—	August 22, 2001	Socorro	LINEAR	V	4.3 km	MPC · JPL
55104	2001 QU_{138}	—	August 22, 2001	Socorro	LINEAR	·	9.1 km	MPC · JPL
55105	2001 QN_{139}	—	August 22, 2001	Socorro	LINEAR	·	4.5 km	MPC · JPL
55106	2001 QR_{141}	—	August 24, 2001	Socorro	LINEAR	KOR	3.4 km	MPC · JPL
55107	2001 QS_{141}	—	August 24, 2001	Socorro	LINEAR	THM	7.8 km	MPC · JPL
55108 Beamueller	2001 QU_{142}	Beamueller	August 24, 2001	Goodricke-Pigott	R. A. Tucker	EOS	6.3 km	MPC · JPL
55109	2001 QL_{145}	—	August 24, 2001	Kitt Peak	Spacewatch	·	4.5 km	MPC · JPL
55110	2001 QF_{146}	—	August 25, 2001	Kitt Peak	Spacewatch	·	4.7 km	MPC · JPL
55111	2001 QD_{152}	—	August 26, 2001	Socorro	LINEAR	·	12 km	MPC · JPL
55112 Mariangela	2001 QQ_{153}	Mariangela	August 28, 2001	Piera	Guarro, J.	EOS	5.6 km	MPC · JPL
55113	2001 QD_{158}	—	August 23, 2001	Anderson Mesa	LONEOS	KOR	2.9 km	MPC · JPL
55114	2001 QD_{160}	—	August 23, 2001	Anderson Mesa	LONEOS	KOR	3.5 km	MPC · JPL
55115	2001 QQ_{162}	—	August 23, 2001	Anderson Mesa	LONEOS	·	3.9 km	MPC · JPL
55116	2001 QU_{165}	—	August 24, 2001	Haleakala	NEAT	·	4.8 km	MPC · JPL
55117	2001 QW_{165}	—	August 24, 2001	Haleakala	NEAT	·	2.6 km	MPC · JPL
55118	2001 QC_{166}	—	August 24, 2001	Haleakala	NEAT	·	3.8 km	MPC · JPL
55119	2001 QM_{167}	—	August 24, 2001	Haleakala	NEAT	·	5.9 km	MPC · JPL
55120	2001 QP_{168}	—	August 25, 2001	Palomar	NEAT	EOS	5.0 km	MPC · JPL
55121	2001 QU_{168}	—	August 26, 2001	Haleakala	NEAT	·	2.1 km	MPC · JPL
55122	2001 QW_{169}	—	August 22, 2001	Socorro	LINEAR	HOF	7.7 km	MPC · JPL
55123	2001 QL_{170}	—	August 23, 2001	Socorro	LINEAR	·	8.2 km	MPC · JPL
55124	2001 QU_{170}	—	August 24, 2001	Socorro	LINEAR	KOR	3.1 km	MPC · JPL
55125	2001 QD_{173}	—	August 25, 2001	Socorro	LINEAR	·	3.6 km	MPC · JPL
55126	2001 QQ_{174}	—	August 27, 2001	Socorro	LINEAR	·	2.5 km	MPC · JPL
55127	2001 QZ_{174}	—	August 21, 2001	Kitt Peak	Spacewatch	·	3.9 km	MPC · JPL
55128	2001 QH_{177}	—	August 21, 2001	Haleakala	NEAT	·	4.9 km	MPC · JPL
55129	2001 QZ_{177}	—	August 26, 2001	Palomar	NEAT	·	3.9 km	MPC · JPL
55130	2001 QR_{179}	—	August 25, 2001	Palomar	NEAT	·	4.8 km	MPC · JPL
55131	2001 QY_{180}	—	August 29, 2001	Palomar	NEAT	·	3.4 km	MPC · JPL
55132	2001 QB_{182}	—	August 30, 2001	Palomar	NEAT	EOS ·	5.8 km	MPC · JPL
55133	2001 QL_{182}	—	August 29, 2001	Palomar	NEAT	·	5.5 km	MPC · JPL
55134	2001 QM_{183}	—	August 25, 2001	Bergisch Gladbach	W. Bickel	THM	8.3 km	MPC · JPL
55135	2001 QP_{183}	—	August 28, 2001	Bergisch Gladbach	W. Bickel	EOS	3.6 km	MPC · JPL
55136	2001 QD_{185}	—	August 21, 2001	Haleakala	NEAT	·	1.5 km	MPC · JPL
55137	2001 QK_{185}	—	August 21, 2001	Socorro	LINEAR	·	6.5 km	MPC · JPL
55138	2001 QL_{185}	—	August 21, 2001	Socorro	LINEAR	·	2.7 km	MPC · JPL
55139	2001 QQ_{190}	—	August 22, 2001	Socorro	LINEAR	·	4.5 km	MPC · JPL
55140	2001 QC_{193}	—	August 22, 2001	Socorro	LINEAR	EOS	6.1 km	MPC · JPL
55141	2001 QP_{193}	—	August 22, 2001	Socorro	LINEAR	·	3.7 km	MPC · JPL
55142	2001 QD_{194}	—	August 22, 2001	Socorro	LINEAR	EUN	5.3 km	MPC · JPL
55143	2001 QS_{195}	—	August 22, 2001	Socorro	LINEAR	PHO	4.2 km	MPC · JPL
55144	2001 QK_{198}	—	August 22, 2001	Socorro	LINEAR	THM	7.1 km	MPC · JPL
55145	2001 QE_{199}	—	August 22, 2001	Socorro	LINEAR	NYS ·	4.5 km	MPC · JPL
55146	2001 QO_{199}	—	August 22, 2001	Socorro	LINEAR	·	3.9 km	MPC · JPL
55147	2001 QT_{199}	—	August 22, 2001	Socorro	LINEAR	·	6.5 km	MPC · JPL
55148	2001 QE_{200}	—	August 22, 2001	Palomar	NEAT	·	4.8 km	MPC · JPL
55149	2001 QD_{202}	—	August 23, 2001	Kitt Peak	Spacewatch	·	3.2 km	MPC · JPL
55150	2001 QQ_{202}	—	August 23, 2001	Anderson Mesa	LONEOS	·	5.4 km	MPC · JPL
55151	2001 QE_{214}	—	August 23, 2001	Anderson Mesa	LONEOS	(5)	2.9 km	MPC · JPL
55152	2001 QN_{218}	—	August 23, 2001	Anderson Mesa	LONEOS	THM	6.4 km	MPC · JPL
55153	2001 QZ_{218}	—	August 23, 2001	Anderson Mesa	LONEOS	PAD	4.5 km	MPC · JPL
55154	2001 QD_{220}	—	August 23, 2001	Socorro	LINEAR	EUN	4.1 km	MPC · JPL
55155	2001 QV_{220}	—	August 24, 2001	Anderson Mesa	LONEOS	·	3.4 km	MPC · JPL
55156	2001 QX_{222}	—	August 24, 2001	Anderson Mesa	LONEOS	·	3.8 km	MPC · JPL
55157	2001 QV_{227}	—	August 24, 2001	Anderson Mesa	LONEOS	·	2.6 km	MPC · JPL
55158	2001 QS_{230}	—	August 24, 2001	Anderson Mesa	LONEOS	·	7.2 km	MPC · JPL
55159	2001 QW_{234}	—	August 24, 2001	Socorro	LINEAR	·	2.3 km	MPC · JPL
55160	2001 QT_{236}	—	August 24, 2001	Socorro	LINEAR	NYS · fast	2.3 km	MPC · JPL
55161	2001 QB_{238}	—	August 24, 2001	Socorro	LINEAR	·	7.5 km	MPC · JPL
55162	2001 QT_{238}	—	August 24, 2001	Socorro	LINEAR	·	3.4 km	MPC · JPL
55163	2001 QV_{238}	—	August 24, 2001	Socorro	LINEAR	KOR	3.7 km	MPC · JPL
55164	2001 QU_{239}	—	August 24, 2001	Socorro	LINEAR	·	3.4 km	MPC · JPL
55165	2001 QC_{242}	—	August 24, 2001	Socorro	LINEAR	·	4.1 km	MPC · JPL
55166	2001 QV_{243}	—	August 24, 2001	Socorro	LINEAR	·	5.0 km	MPC · JPL
55167	2001 QY_{243}	—	August 24, 2001	Socorro	LINEAR	·	6.7 km	MPC · JPL
55168	2001 QK_{250}	—	August 24, 2001	Haleakala	NEAT	·	7.1 km	MPC · JPL
55169	2001 QQ_{252}	—	August 25, 2001	Socorro	LINEAR	·	2.4 km	MPC · JPL
55170	2001 QU_{255}	—	August 25, 2001	Socorro	LINEAR	EOS	4.6 km	MPC · JPL
55171	2001 QO_{256}	—	August 25, 2001	Socorro	LINEAR	·	3.7 km	MPC · JPL
55172	2001 QY_{257}	—	August 25, 2001	Socorro	LINEAR	MAR	3.7 km	MPC · JPL
55173	2001 QZ_{257}	—	August 25, 2001	Socorro	LINEAR	·	3.0 km	MPC · JPL
55174	2001 QW_{258}	—	August 25, 2001	Socorro	LINEAR	V · fast	2.2 km	MPC · JPL
55175	2001 QN_{261}	—	August 25, 2001	Socorro	LINEAR	·	4.2 km	MPC · JPL
55176	2001 QD_{262}	—	August 25, 2001	Socorro	LINEAR	·	3.4 km	MPC · JPL
55177	2001 QM_{263}	—	August 25, 2001	Anderson Mesa	LONEOS	KOR	3.8 km	MPC · JPL
55178	2001 QF_{265}	—	August 26, 2001	Socorro	LINEAR	·	4.2 km	MPC · JPL
55179	2001 QT_{276}	—	August 19, 2001	Socorro	LINEAR	·	10 km	MPC · JPL
55180	2001 QW_{279}	—	August 19, 2001	Socorro	LINEAR	PHO	4.4 km	MPC · JPL
55181	2001 QD_{280}	—	August 19, 2001	Socorro	LINEAR	JUN	9.1 km	MPC · JPL
55182	2001 QB_{282}	—	August 19, 2001	Anderson Mesa	LONEOS	HNS	4.6 km	MPC · JPL
55183	2001 QK_{284}	—	August 18, 2001	Palomar	NEAT	EOS	9.2 km	MPC · JPL
55184	2001 QX_{286}	—	August 17, 2001	Socorro	LINEAR	·	8.1 km	MPC · JPL
55185	2001 QB_{287}	—	August 17, 2001	Socorro	LINEAR	·	6.7 km	MPC · JPL
55186	2001 QQ_{289}	—	August 16, 2001	Socorro	LINEAR	·	4.8 km	MPC · JPL
55187	2001 QX_{290}	—	August 16, 2001	Socorro	LINEAR	·	3.3 km	MPC · JPL
55188	2001 QF_{292}	—	August 16, 2001	Socorro	LINEAR	THM	9.4 km	MPC · JPL
55189	2001 QW_{294}	—	August 24, 2001	Socorro	LINEAR	·	5.2 km	MPC · JPL
55190	2001 QC_{297}	—	August 24, 2001	Socorro	LINEAR	·	2.5 km	MPC · JPL
55191	2001 QG_{297}	—	August 24, 2001	Anderson Mesa	LONEOS	EUN	4.8 km	MPC · JPL
55192	2001 RN_{2}	—	September 8, 2001	Prescott	P. G. Comba	CYB	3.9 km	MPC · JPL
55193	2001 RH_{4}	—	September 8, 2001	Socorro	LINEAR	·	5.2 km	MPC · JPL
55194	2001 RP_{11}	—	September 10, 2001	Desert Eagle	W. K. Y. Yeung	·	4.6 km	MPC · JPL
55195	2001 RC_{13}	—	September 9, 2001	Socorro	LINEAR	·	3.8 km	MPC · JPL
55196 Marchini	2001 RM_{16}	Marchini	September 11, 2001	San Marcello	A. Boattini, L. Tesi	3:2	10 km	MPC · JPL
55197	2001 RN_{17}	—	September 11, 2001	Desert Eagle	W. K. Y. Yeung	AST	6.5 km	MPC · JPL
55198	2001 RV_{18}	—	September 7, 2001	Socorro	LINEAR	·	5.7 km	MPC · JPL
55199	2001 RG_{19}	—	September 7, 2001	Socorro	LINEAR	MAS	1.7 km	MPC · JPL
55200	2001 RO_{19}	—	September 7, 2001	Socorro	LINEAR	·	6.8 km	MPC · JPL

== 55201–55300 ==
back to top

Designation			Discovery			Properties		Ref
Permanent	Provisional	Named after	Date	Site	Discoverer(s)	Category	Diam.	Ref
55201	2001 RL_{23}	—	September 7, 2001	Socorro	LINEAR	NYS	1.4 km	MPC · JPL
55202	2001 RW_{23}	—	September 7, 2001	Socorro	LINEAR	·	4.8 km	MPC · JPL
55203	2001 RZ_{24}	—	September 7, 2001	Socorro	LINEAR	·	7.3 km	MPC · JPL
55204	2001 RE_{28}	—	September 7, 2001	Socorro	LINEAR	·	6.3 km	MPC · JPL
55205	2001 RQ_{29}	—	September 7, 2001	Socorro	LINEAR	·	9.8 km	MPC · JPL
55206	2001 RM_{32}	—	September 8, 2001	Socorro	LINEAR	·	5.0 km	MPC · JPL
55207	2001 RN_{32}	—	September 8, 2001	Socorro	LINEAR	·	4.6 km	MPC · JPL
55208	2001 RJ_{35}	—	September 8, 2001	Socorro	LINEAR	·	3.3 km	MPC · JPL
55209	2001 RA_{36}	—	September 8, 2001	Socorro	LINEAR	·	2.0 km	MPC · JPL
55210	2001 RN_{36}	—	September 8, 2001	Socorro	LINEAR	·	3.4 km	MPC · JPL
55211	2001 RL_{43}	—	September 13, 2001	Ametlla de Mar	J. Nomen	HYG	8.1 km	MPC · JPL
55212 Yukitoayatsuji	2001 RG_{46}	Yukitoayatsuji	September 12, 2001	Goodricke-Pigott	R. A. Tucker	·	4.8 km	MPC · JPL
55213	2001 RC_{49}	—	September 11, 2001	Socorro	LINEAR	·	10 km	MPC · JPL
55214	2001 RJ_{49}	—	September 9, 2001	Socorro	LINEAR	·	2.2 km	MPC · JPL
55215	2001 RG_{54}	—	September 12, 2001	Socorro	LINEAR	·	3.4 km	MPC · JPL
55216	2001 RH_{60}	—	September 12, 2001	Socorro	LINEAR	·	4.4 km	MPC · JPL
55217	2001 RV_{60}	—	September 12, 2001	Socorro	LINEAR	·	7.3 km	MPC · JPL
55218	2001 RW_{60}	—	September 12, 2001	Socorro	LINEAR	·	10 km	MPC · JPL
55219	2001 RQ_{61}	—	September 12, 2001	Socorro	LINEAR	·	5.2 km	MPC · JPL
55220	2001 RE_{63}	—	September 12, 2001	Socorro	LINEAR	EOS	4.6 km	MPC · JPL
55221 Nancynoblitt	2001 RM_{63}	Nancynoblitt	September 11, 2001	Oakley	Wolfe, C.	·	11 km	MPC · JPL
55222 Makotoshinkai	2001 RP_{63}	Makotoshinkai	September 12, 2001	Goodricke-Pigott	R. A. Tucker	·	7.2 km	MPC · JPL
55223 Akiraifukube	2001 RQ_{63}	Akiraifukube	September 12, 2001	Goodricke-Pigott	R. A. Tucker	·	3.8 km	MPC · JPL
55224	2001 RR_{69}	—	September 10, 2001	Socorro	LINEAR	·	3.0 km	MPC · JPL
55225	2001 RG_{70}	—	September 10, 2001	Socorro	LINEAR	·	6.9 km	MPC · JPL
55226	2001 RV_{70}	—	September 10, 2001	Socorro	LINEAR	(1298)	14 km	MPC · JPL
55227	2001 RB_{71}	—	September 10, 2001	Socorro	LINEAR	·	4.1 km	MPC · JPL
55228	2001 RR_{72}	—	September 10, 2001	Socorro	LINEAR	KOR	4.1 km	MPC · JPL
55229	2001 RH_{73}	—	September 10, 2001	Socorro	LINEAR	EOS	4.2 km	MPC · JPL
55230	2001 RO_{73}	—	September 10, 2001	Socorro	LINEAR	V	1.4 km	MPC · JPL
55231	2001 RC_{74}	—	September 10, 2001	Socorro	LINEAR	·	3.6 km	MPC · JPL
55232	2001 RR_{74}	—	September 10, 2001	Socorro	LINEAR	·	6.4 km	MPC · JPL
55233	2001 RZ_{74}	—	September 10, 2001	Socorro	LINEAR	·	5.1 km	MPC · JPL
55234	2001 RC_{75}	—	September 10, 2001	Socorro	LINEAR	·	14 km	MPC · JPL
55235	2001 RD_{80}	—	September 9, 2001	Haleakala	NEAT	·	2.8 km	MPC · JPL
55236	2001 RW_{80}	—	September 13, 2001	Palomar	NEAT	·	6.4 km	MPC · JPL
55237	2001 RK_{81}	—	September 14, 2001	Palomar	NEAT	·	3.0 km	MPC · JPL
55238	2001 RY_{83}	—	September 11, 2001	Anderson Mesa	LONEOS	NYS	3.1 km	MPC · JPL
55239	2001 RZ_{84}	—	September 11, 2001	Anderson Mesa	LONEOS	HYG	6.3 km	MPC · JPL
55240	2001 RP_{85}	—	September 11, 2001	Anderson Mesa	LONEOS	EOS	4.7 km	MPC · JPL
55241	2001 RL_{86}	—	September 11, 2001	Anderson Mesa	LONEOS	·	2.6 km	MPC · JPL
55242	2001 RP_{86}	—	September 11, 2001	Anderson Mesa	LONEOS	·	6.9 km	MPC · JPL
55243	2001 RF_{87}	—	September 11, 2001	Anderson Mesa	LONEOS	·	5.5 km	MPC · JPL
55244	2001 RA_{89}	—	September 11, 2001	Anderson Mesa	LONEOS	NYS	2.9 km	MPC · JPL
55245	2001 RQ_{92}	—	September 11, 2001	Anderson Mesa	LONEOS	·	4.3 km	MPC · JPL
55246	2001 RM_{93}	—	September 11, 2001	Anderson Mesa	LONEOS	·	4.5 km	MPC · JPL
55247	2001 RO_{93}	—	September 11, 2001	Anderson Mesa	LONEOS	·	5.3 km	MPC · JPL
55248	2001 RF_{99}	—	September 12, 2001	Socorro	LINEAR	·	4.8 km	MPC · JPL
55249	2001 RQ_{102}	—	September 12, 2001	Socorro	LINEAR	V	1.8 km	MPC · JPL
55250	2001 RX_{102}	—	September 12, 2001	Socorro	LINEAR	KOR	3.3 km	MPC · JPL
55251	2001 RZ_{105}	—	September 12, 2001	Socorro	LINEAR	·	3.7 km	MPC · JPL
55252	2001 RZ_{107}	—	September 12, 2001	Socorro	LINEAR	KOR	3.1 km	MPC · JPL
55253	2001 RZ_{110}	—	September 12, 2001	Socorro	LINEAR	KOR	3.9 km	MPC · JPL
55254	2001 RP_{117}	—	September 12, 2001	Socorro	LINEAR	·	6.4 km	MPC · JPL
55255	2001 RJ_{118}	—	September 12, 2001	Socorro	LINEAR	·	6.0 km	MPC · JPL
55256	2001 RZ_{119}	—	September 12, 2001	Socorro	LINEAR	HYG	9.6 km	MPC · JPL
55257	2001 RQ_{120}	—	September 12, 2001	Socorro	LINEAR	MAS	2.3 km	MPC · JPL
55258	2001 RX_{120}	—	September 12, 2001	Socorro	LINEAR	·	3.4 km	MPC · JPL
55259	2001 RH_{122}	—	September 12, 2001	Socorro	LINEAR	·	2.3 km	MPC · JPL
55260	2001 RG_{123}	—	September 12, 2001	Socorro	LINEAR	·	2.3 km	MPC · JPL
55261	2001 RV_{125}	—	September 12, 2001	Socorro	LINEAR	·	6.1 km	MPC · JPL
55262	2001 RE_{126}	—	September 12, 2001	Socorro	LINEAR	·	1.7 km	MPC · JPL
55263	2001 RR_{126}	—	September 12, 2001	Socorro	LINEAR	·	2.7 km	MPC · JPL
55264	2001 RW_{127}	—	September 12, 2001	Socorro	LINEAR	MIS	5.8 km	MPC · JPL
55265	2001 RF_{130}	—	September 12, 2001	Socorro	LINEAR	·	4.9 km	MPC · JPL
55266	2001 RX_{130}	—	September 12, 2001	Socorro	LINEAR	·	3.1 km	MPC · JPL
55267	2001 RP_{132}	—	September 12, 2001	Socorro	LINEAR	L5	24 km	MPC · JPL
55268	2001 RE_{133}	—	September 12, 2001	Socorro	LINEAR	(5)	3.5 km	MPC · JPL
55269	2001 RG_{141}	—	September 12, 2001	Socorro	LINEAR	·	3.8 km	MPC · JPL
55270	2001 RT_{147}	—	September 10, 2001	Anderson Mesa	LONEOS	·	6.9 km	MPC · JPL
55271	2001 RV_{150}	—	September 11, 2001	Anderson Mesa	LONEOS	V	1.5 km	MPC · JPL
55272	2001 RG_{155}	—	September 12, 2001	Socorro	LINEAR	·	7.5 km	MPC · JPL
55273	2001 SY	—	September 17, 2001	Desert Eagle	W. K. Y. Yeung	·	6.7 km	MPC · JPL
55274	2001 SN_{3}	—	September 17, 2001	Desert Eagle	W. K. Y. Yeung	·	4.0 km	MPC · JPL
55275	2001 SX_{9}	—	September 18, 2001	Desert Eagle	W. K. Y. Yeung	·	7.8 km	MPC · JPL
55276 Kenlarner	2001 SK_{10}	Kenlarner	September 16, 2001	Needville	J. Dellinger, Dillon, W. G.	·	2.8 km	MPC · JPL
55277	2001 SV_{15}	—	September 16, 2001	Socorro	LINEAR	·	5.7 km	MPC · JPL
55278	2001 SP_{17}	—	September 16, 2001	Socorro	LINEAR	·	6.0 km	MPC · JPL
55279	2001 SX_{17}	—	September 16, 2001	Socorro	LINEAR	KOR	4.5 km	MPC · JPL
55280	2001 SC_{20}	—	September 16, 2001	Socorro	LINEAR	·	5.7 km	MPC · JPL
55281	2001 SH_{20}	—	September 16, 2001	Socorro	LINEAR	AST	5.4 km	MPC · JPL
55282	2001 SK_{20}	—	September 16, 2001	Socorro	LINEAR	KOR	3.6 km	MPC · JPL
55283	2001 SN_{20}	—	September 16, 2001	Socorro	LINEAR	·	9.6 km	MPC · JPL
55284	2001 SN_{21}	—	September 16, 2001	Socorro	LINEAR	·	4.5 km	MPC · JPL
55285	2001 SQ_{22}	—	September 16, 2001	Socorro	LINEAR	(5)	4.0 km	MPC · JPL
55286	2001 SS_{22}	—	September 16, 2001	Socorro	LINEAR	·	4.7 km	MPC · JPL
55287	2001 SC_{24}	—	September 16, 2001	Socorro	LINEAR	·	3.1 km	MPC · JPL
55288	2001 SZ_{30}	—	September 16, 2001	Socorro	LINEAR	KOR	4.2 km	MPC · JPL
55289	2001 SB_{37}	—	September 16, 2001	Socorro	LINEAR	EOS	4.1 km	MPC · JPL
55290	2001 SV_{37}	—	September 16, 2001	Socorro	LINEAR	·	6.7 km	MPC · JPL
55291	2001 SG_{38}	—	September 16, 2001	Socorro	LINEAR	V	1.6 km	MPC · JPL
55292	2001 SN_{39}	—	September 16, 2001	Socorro	LINEAR	·	6.1 km	MPC · JPL
55293	2001 SY_{39}	—	September 16, 2001	Socorro	LINEAR	V	1.3 km	MPC · JPL
55294	2001 ST_{42}	—	September 16, 2001	Socorro	LINEAR	·	5.5 km	MPC · JPL
55295	2001 SJ_{43}	—	September 16, 2001	Socorro	LINEAR	·	3.4 km	MPC · JPL
55296	2001 SG_{44}	—	September 16, 2001	Socorro	LINEAR	·	2.2 km	MPC · JPL
55297	2001 SO_{44}	—	September 16, 2001	Socorro	LINEAR	·	3.9 km	MPC · JPL
55298	2001 ST_{44}	—	September 16, 2001	Socorro	LINEAR	·	1.9 km	MPC · JPL
55299	2001 SX_{44}	—	September 16, 2001	Socorro	LINEAR	EUN	3.0 km	MPC · JPL
55300	2001 SL_{45}	—	September 16, 2001	Socorro	LINEAR	slow	6.9 km	MPC · JPL

== 55301–55400 ==
back to top

Designation			Discovery			Properties		Ref
Permanent	Provisional	Named after	Date	Site	Discoverer(s)	Category	Diam.	Ref
55301	2001 SR_{46}	—	September 16, 2001	Socorro	LINEAR	KOR	3.7 km	MPC · JPL
55302	2001 SC_{48}	—	September 16, 2001	Socorro	LINEAR	HOF	9.5 km	MPC · JPL
55303	2001 SB_{51}	—	September 16, 2001	Socorro	LINEAR	AGN	2.9 km	MPC · JPL
55304	2001 SM_{51}	—	September 16, 2001	Socorro	LINEAR	·	4.1 km	MPC · JPL
55305	2001 SE_{53}	—	September 16, 2001	Socorro	LINEAR	·	6.4 km	MPC · JPL
55306	2001 SP_{53}	—	September 16, 2001	Socorro	LINEAR	HYG	8.3 km	MPC · JPL
55307	2001 SO_{56}	—	September 16, 2001	Socorro	LINEAR	HYG	8.3 km	MPC · JPL
55308	2001 SW_{56}	—	September 16, 2001	Socorro	LINEAR	MRX	3.8 km	MPC · JPL
55309	2001 SN_{58}	—	September 17, 2001	Socorro	LINEAR	·	9.8 km	MPC · JPL
55310	2001 SY_{58}	—	September 17, 2001	Socorro	LINEAR	KOR	3.7 km	MPC · JPL
55311	2001 SR_{59}	—	September 17, 2001	Socorro	LINEAR	KOR	3.1 km	MPC · JPL
55312	2001 SK_{60}	—	September 17, 2001	Socorro	LINEAR	·	9.7 km	MPC · JPL
55313	2001 SS_{63}	—	September 17, 2001	Socorro	LINEAR	·	4.3 km	MPC · JPL
55314	2001 SC_{64}	—	September 17, 2001	Socorro	LINEAR	·	6.4 km	MPC · JPL
55315	2001 SJ_{65}	—	September 17, 2001	Socorro	LINEAR	·	2.4 km	MPC · JPL
55316	2001 SQ_{66}	—	September 17, 2001	Socorro	LINEAR	·	6.6 km	MPC · JPL
55317	2001 SF_{67}	—	September 17, 2001	Socorro	LINEAR	·	4.3 km	MPC · JPL
55318	2001 SR_{71}	—	September 17, 2001	Socorro	LINEAR	·	4.8 km	MPC · JPL
55319 Takanashi	2001 SK_{73}	Takanashi	September 18, 2001	Goodricke-Pigott	R. A. Tucker	·	8.0 km	MPC · JPL
55320 Busler	2001 SL_{73}	Busler	September 19, 2001	Goodricke-Pigott	R. A. Tucker	·	7.4 km	MPC · JPL
55321	2001 SC_{78}	—	September 19, 2001	Socorro	LINEAR	·	4.0 km	MPC · JPL
55322	2001 SH_{82}	—	September 20, 2001	Socorro	LINEAR	·	2.8 km	MPC · JPL
55323	2001 SN_{94}	—	September 20, 2001	Socorro	LINEAR	·	4.1 km	MPC · JPL
55324	2001 SH_{106}	—	September 20, 2001	Socorro	LINEAR	·	13 km	MPC · JPL
55325	2001 SL_{106}	—	September 20, 2001	Socorro	LINEAR	EOS	5.4 km	MPC · JPL
55326	2001 SR_{107}	—	September 20, 2001	Socorro	LINEAR	·	3.8 km	MPC · JPL
55327	2001 SD_{109}	—	September 20, 2001	Socorro	LINEAR	GEF	4.6 km	MPC · JPL
55328	2001 SJ_{110}	—	September 20, 2001	Socorro	LINEAR	EOS	7.8 km	MPC · JPL
55329	2001 SQ_{111}	—	September 20, 2001	Socorro	LINEAR	·	2.2 km	MPC · JPL
55330 Shekwaihung	2001 SD_{114}	Shekwaihung	September 20, 2001	Desert Eagle	W. K. Y. Yeung	(5)	4.0 km	MPC · JPL
55331 Putzi	2001 SY_{115}	Putzi	September 21, 2001	Fountain Hills	C. W. Juels, P. R. Holvorcem	·	11 km	MPC · JPL
55332	2001 SR_{117}	—	September 16, 2001	Socorro	LINEAR	slow	3.6 km	MPC · JPL
55333	2001 SZ_{117}	—	September 16, 2001	Socorro	LINEAR	·	3.6 km	MPC · JPL
55334	2001 SU_{120}	—	September 16, 2001	Socorro	LINEAR	HYG	9.4 km	MPC · JPL
55335	2001 SO_{123}	—	September 16, 2001	Socorro	LINEAR	EOS	9.1 km	MPC · JPL
55336	2001 SS_{123}	—	September 16, 2001	Socorro	LINEAR	·	4.5 km	MPC · JPL
55337	2001 SL_{124}	—	September 16, 2001	Socorro	LINEAR	·	3.4 km	MPC · JPL
55338	2001 SK_{125}	—	September 16, 2001	Socorro	LINEAR	EOS	6.2 km	MPC · JPL
55339	2001 SO_{125}	—	September 16, 2001	Socorro	LINEAR	·	3.3 km	MPC · JPL
55340	2001 ST_{125}	—	September 16, 2001	Socorro	LINEAR	·	3.9 km	MPC · JPL
55341	2001 SK_{128}	—	September 16, 2001	Socorro	LINEAR	·	2.6 km	MPC · JPL
55342	2001 SX_{128}	—	September 16, 2001	Socorro	LINEAR	·	4.3 km	MPC · JPL
55343	2001 SU_{135}	—	September 16, 2001	Socorro	LINEAR	·	3.4 km	MPC · JPL
55344	2001 SH_{138}	—	September 16, 2001	Socorro	LINEAR	·	2.8 km	MPC · JPL
55345	2001 SL_{138}	—	September 16, 2001	Socorro	LINEAR	·	2.1 km	MPC · JPL
55346	2001 SS_{139}	—	September 16, 2001	Socorro	LINEAR	MAS	1.6 km	MPC · JPL
55347	2001 SH_{142}	—	September 16, 2001	Socorro	LINEAR	3:2	10 km	MPC · JPL
55348	2001 SV_{144}	—	September 16, 2001	Socorro	LINEAR	·	4.7 km	MPC · JPL
55349	2001 SF_{147}	—	September 16, 2001	Socorro	LINEAR	·	4.4 km	MPC · JPL
55350	2001 SK_{147}	—	September 17, 2001	Socorro	LINEAR	KOR	4.5 km	MPC · JPL
55351	2001 ST_{147}	—	September 17, 2001	Socorro	LINEAR	·	8.8 km	MPC · JPL
55352	2001 SD_{150}	—	September 17, 2001	Socorro	LINEAR	·	2.7 km	MPC · JPL
55353	2001 SW_{152}	—	September 17, 2001	Socorro	LINEAR	·	3.6 km	MPC · JPL
55354	2001 SQ_{154}	—	September 17, 2001	Socorro	LINEAR	HYG	7.7 km	MPC · JPL
55355	2001 SD_{155}	—	September 17, 2001	Socorro	LINEAR	·	7.1 km	MPC · JPL
55356	2001 SY_{157}	—	September 17, 2001	Socorro	LINEAR	·	7.5 km	MPC · JPL
55357	2001 SY_{160}	—	September 17, 2001	Socorro	LINEAR	MRX	3.8 km	MPC · JPL
55358	2001 SP_{161}	—	September 17, 2001	Socorro	LINEAR	·	4.4 km	MPC · JPL
55359	2001 SV_{171}	—	September 16, 2001	Socorro	LINEAR	AGN	3.7 km	MPC · JPL
55360	2001 SK_{173}	—	September 16, 2001	Socorro	LINEAR	·	4.8 km	MPC · JPL
55361	2001 SN_{176}	—	September 16, 2001	Socorro	LINEAR	EUN	3.0 km	MPC · JPL
55362	2001 SM_{178}	—	September 17, 2001	Socorro	LINEAR	MAR	3.1 km	MPC · JPL
55363	2001 SZ_{178}	—	September 17, 2001	Socorro	LINEAR	·	7.2 km	MPC · JPL
55364	2001 ST_{180}	—	September 19, 2001	Socorro	LINEAR	·	4.6 km	MPC · JPL
55365	2001 ST_{181}	—	September 19, 2001	Socorro	LINEAR	·	3.8 km	MPC · JPL
55366	2001 SA_{184}	—	September 19, 2001	Socorro	LINEAR	·	3.6 km	MPC · JPL
55367	2001 SX_{208}	—	September 19, 2001	Socorro	LINEAR	EOS	4.2 km	MPC · JPL
55368	2001 SJ_{218}	—	September 19, 2001	Socorro	LINEAR	THM	6.4 km	MPC · JPL
55369	2001 SX_{224}	—	September 19, 2001	Socorro	LINEAR	·	3.1 km	MPC · JPL
55370	2001 SG_{232}	—	September 19, 2001	Socorro	LINEAR	·	3.5 km	MPC · JPL
55371	2001 SP_{239}	—	September 19, 2001	Socorro	LINEAR	·	5.3 km	MPC · JPL
55372	2001 SZ_{239}	—	September 19, 2001	Socorro	LINEAR	·	7.4 km	MPC · JPL
55373	2001 SE_{240}	—	September 19, 2001	Socorro	LINEAR	NYS	2.9 km	MPC · JPL
55374	2001 SE_{244}	—	September 19, 2001	Socorro	LINEAR	·	2.7 km	MPC · JPL
55375	2001 SW_{247}	—	September 19, 2001	Socorro	LINEAR	·	4.7 km	MPC · JPL
55376	2001 SM_{250}	—	September 19, 2001	Socorro	LINEAR	V	2.0 km	MPC · JPL
55377	2001 SV_{254}	—	September 19, 2001	Socorro	LINEAR	·	7.5 km	MPC · JPL
55378	2001 SA_{255}	—	September 19, 2001	Socorro	LINEAR	·	4.6 km	MPC · JPL
55379	2001 SW_{255}	—	September 19, 2001	Socorro	LINEAR	·	7.6 km	MPC · JPL
55380	2001 SB_{264}	—	September 24, 2001	Socorro	LINEAR	·	2.9 km	MPC · JPL
55381 Lautakwah	2001 SX_{264}	Lautakwah	September 25, 2001	Desert Eagle	W. K. Y. Yeung	·	8.4 km	MPC · JPL
55382 Kootinlok	2001 SS_{265}	Kootinlok	September 25, 2001	Desert Eagle	W. K. Y. Yeung	·	3.5 km	MPC · JPL
55383 Cheungkwokwing	2001 SX_{266}	Cheungkwokwing	September 25, 2001	Desert Eagle	W. K. Y. Yeung	·	4.0 km	MPC · JPL
55384 Muiyimfong	2001 SQ_{267}	Muiyimfong	September 25, 2001	Desert Eagle	W. K. Y. Yeung	NYS	3.9 km	MPC · JPL
55385	2001 SJ_{271}	—	September 20, 2001	Socorro	LINEAR	·	4.1 km	MPC · JPL
55386	2001 SY_{271}	—	September 20, 2001	Socorro	LINEAR	·	8.2 km	MPC · JPL
55387	2001 SD_{272}	—	September 20, 2001	Socorro	LINEAR	·	3.7 km	MPC · JPL
55388	2001 SN_{276}	—	September 21, 2001	Palomar	NEAT	·	1.7 km	MPC · JPL
55389	2001 SX_{276}	—	September 21, 2001	Palomar	NEAT	EUN	4.6 km	MPC · JPL
55390	2001 SY_{276}	—	September 21, 2001	Palomar	NEAT	EOS	4.6 km	MPC · JPL
55391	2001 ST_{277}	—	September 21, 2001	Anderson Mesa	LONEOS	·	4.5 km	MPC · JPL
55392	2001 SA_{280}	—	September 21, 2001	Anderson Mesa	LONEOS	KOR	3.8 km	MPC · JPL
55393	2001 SB_{280}	—	September 21, 2001	Anderson Mesa	LONEOS	KOR	3.1 km	MPC · JPL
55394	2001 SN_{280}	—	September 21, 2001	Anderson Mesa	LONEOS	·	4.3 km	MPC · JPL
55395	2001 SY_{285}	—	September 28, 2001	Fountain Hills	C. W. Juels, P. R. Holvorcem	·	4.5 km	MPC · JPL
55396	2001 SZ_{287}	—	September 27, 2001	Palomar	NEAT	MAR	2.9 km	MPC · JPL
55397 Hackman	2001 SY_{288}	Hackman	September 22, 2001	Goodricke-Pigott	R. A. Tucker	·	7.8 km	MPC · JPL
55398	2001 SX_{289}	—	September 29, 2001	Palomar	NEAT	VER ·	6.9 km	MPC · JPL
55399 Jasonsoderblom	2001 SQ_{291}	Jasonsoderblom	September 17, 2001	Anderson Mesa	LONEOS	EUN	3.4 km	MPC · JPL
55400	2001 SB_{315}	—	September 25, 2001	Socorro	LINEAR	·	3.8 km	MPC · JPL

== 55401–55500 ==
back to top

Designation			Discovery			Properties		Ref
Permanent	Provisional	Named after	Date	Site	Discoverer(s)	Category	Diam.	Ref
55401	2001 SX_{316}	—	September 24, 2001	Anderson Mesa	LONEOS	·	3.5 km	MPC · JPL
55402	2001 SS_{322}	—	September 25, 2001	Socorro	LINEAR	HYG	4.7 km	MPC · JPL
55403	2001 SG_{325}	—	September 16, 2001	Socorro	LINEAR	·	10 km	MPC · JPL
55404	2001 SY_{343}	—	September 22, 2001	Palomar	NEAT	·	10 km	MPC · JPL
55405	2001 SV_{348}	—	September 18, 2001	Palomar	NEAT	EOS	5.1 km	MPC · JPL
55406	2001 TD_{1}	—	October 8, 2001	Palomar	NEAT	·	6.8 km	MPC · JPL
55407	2001 TQ_{1}	—	October 11, 2001	Farpoint	Farpoint	EOS	4.1 km	MPC · JPL
55408	2001 TC_{2}	—	October 11, 2001	Socorro	LINEAR	APO	460 m	MPC · JPL
55409	2001 TF_{2}	—	October 5, 2001	Palomar	NEAT	·	3.9 km	MPC · JPL
55410	2001 TB_{4}	—	October 7, 2001	Palomar	NEAT	NYS	3.3 km	MPC · JPL
55411	2001 TM_{4}	—	October 7, 2001	Palomar	NEAT	·	6.8 km	MPC · JPL
55412	2001 TO_{4}	—	October 7, 2001	Palomar	NEAT	NYS	2.2 km	MPC · JPL
55413	2001 TA_{9}	—	October 9, 2001	Socorro	LINEAR	EOS	6.1 km	MPC · JPL
55414	2001 TM_{9}	—	October 11, 2001	Socorro	LINEAR	EUN	3.0 km	MPC · JPL
55415	2001 TA_{11}	—	October 13, 2001	Socorro	LINEAR	·	3.3 km	MPC · JPL
55416	2001 TF_{16}	—	October 11, 2001	Socorro	LINEAR	ADE	7.7 km	MPC · JPL
55417	2001 TR_{16}	—	October 11, 2001	Socorro	LINEAR	·	9.9 km	MPC · JPL
55418 Bianciardi	2001 TJ_{17}	Bianciardi	October 13, 2001	San Marcello	L. Tesi, M. Tombelli	·	6.8 km	MPC · JPL
55419 Astynoos	2001 TF_{19}	Astynoos	October 9, 2001	Socorro	LINEAR	L5	31 km	MPC · JPL
55420	2001 TV_{20}	—	October 9, 2001	Socorro	LINEAR	·	14 km	MPC · JPL
55421	2001 TJ_{24}	—	October 14, 2001	Socorro	LINEAR	HYG	5.8 km	MPC · JPL
55422	2001 TW_{30}	—	October 14, 2001	Socorro	LINEAR	·	4.0 km	MPC · JPL
55423	2001 TT_{33}	—	October 14, 2001	Socorro	LINEAR	·	6.4 km	MPC · JPL
55424	2001 TQ_{34}	—	October 14, 2001	Socorro	LINEAR	EUN	3.2 km	MPC · JPL
55425	2001 TR_{43}	—	October 14, 2001	Socorro	LINEAR	·	9.5 km	MPC · JPL
55426	2001 TL_{45}	—	October 14, 2001	Desert Eagle	W. K. Y. Yeung	·	6.0 km	MPC · JPL
55427 Rosta	2001 TF_{47}	Rosta	October 14, 2001	Cima Ekar	ADAS	·	5.8 km	MPC · JPL
55428 Cappellaro	2001 TN_{47}	Cappellaro	October 14, 2001	Cima Ekar	ADAS	·	3.8 km	MPC · JPL
55429	2001 TQ_{52}	—	October 13, 2001	Socorro	LINEAR	·	6.1 km	MPC · JPL
55430	2001 TY_{52}	—	October 13, 2001	Socorro	LINEAR	KOR	5.0 km	MPC · JPL
55431	2001 TG_{55}	—	October 14, 2001	Socorro	LINEAR	·	6.2 km	MPC · JPL
55432	2001 TR_{56}	—	October 15, 2001	Desert Eagle	W. K. Y. Yeung	EOS	6.1 km	MPC · JPL
55433	2001 TU_{60}	—	October 13, 2001	Socorro	LINEAR	·	2.7 km	MPC · JPL
55434	2001 TZ_{66}	—	October 13, 2001	Socorro	LINEAR	KOR	3.2 km	MPC · JPL
55435	2001 TY_{67}	—	October 13, 2001	Socorro	LINEAR	THM	6.1 km	MPC · JPL
55436	2001 TL_{69}	—	October 13, 2001	Socorro	LINEAR	·	2.8 km	MPC · JPL
55437	2001 TB_{78}	—	October 13, 2001	Socorro	LINEAR	(12739)	5.0 km	MPC · JPL
55438	2001 TJ_{78}	—	October 13, 2001	Socorro	LINEAR	·	3.1 km	MPC · JPL
55439	2001 TZ_{84}	—	October 14, 2001	Socorro	LINEAR	3:2 · SHU	10 km	MPC · JPL
55440	2001 TY_{85}	—	October 14, 2001	Socorro	LINEAR	ERI	4.9 km	MPC · JPL
55441	2001 TS_{87}	—	October 14, 2001	Socorro	LINEAR	L5	16 km	MPC · JPL
55442	2001 TQ_{92}	—	October 14, 2001	Socorro	LINEAR	EOS	4.0 km	MPC · JPL
55443	2001 TY_{92}	—	October 14, 2001	Socorro	LINEAR	·	5.7 km	MPC · JPL
55444	2001 TC_{96}	—	October 14, 2001	Socorro	LINEAR	·	8.3 km	MPC · JPL
55445	2001 TB_{102}	—	October 15, 2001	Socorro	LINEAR	·	7.7 km	MPC · JPL
55446	2001 TZ_{108}	—	October 14, 2001	Socorro	LINEAR	EOS	5.0 km	MPC · JPL
55447	2001 TJ_{111}	—	October 14, 2001	Socorro	LINEAR	PAD	3.7 km	MPC · JPL
55448	2001 TT_{114}	—	October 14, 2001	Socorro	LINEAR	·	2.6 km	MPC · JPL
55449	2001 TB_{118}	—	October 15, 2001	Socorro	LINEAR	·	8.0 km	MPC · JPL
55450	2001 TG_{120}	—	October 15, 2001	Socorro	LINEAR	·	4.5 km	MPC · JPL
55451	2001 TM_{123}	—	October 12, 2001	Haleakala	NEAT	ADE	7.8 km	MPC · JPL
55452	2001 TE_{125}	—	October 12, 2001	Haleakala	NEAT	·	9.2 km	MPC · JPL
55453	2001 TZ_{127}	—	October 10, 2001	Palomar	NEAT	·	10 km	MPC · JPL
55454	2001 TJ_{128}	—	October 11, 2001	Palomar	NEAT	·	4.2 km	MPC · JPL
55455	2001 TR_{131}	—	October 11, 2001	Palomar	NEAT	·	7.8 km	MPC · JPL
55456	2001 TW_{131}	—	October 11, 2001	Palomar	NEAT	·	1.9 km	MPC · JPL
55457	2001 TH_{133}	—	October 12, 2001	Haleakala	NEAT	L5	24 km	MPC · JPL
55458	2001 TK_{137}	—	October 14, 2001	Palomar	NEAT	EOS	6.8 km	MPC · JPL
55459	2001 TW_{139}	—	October 10, 2001	Palomar	NEAT	·	3.2 km	MPC · JPL
55460	2001 TW_{148}	—	October 10, 2001	Palomar	NEAT	L5	15 km	MPC · JPL
55461	2001 TC_{154}	—	October 15, 2001	Palomar	NEAT	MAR	2.5 km	MPC · JPL
55462	2001 TB_{160}	—	October 15, 2001	Palomar	NEAT	·	6.8 km	MPC · JPL
55463	2001 TL_{160}	—	October 15, 2001	Kitt Peak	Spacewatch	NYS	3.1 km	MPC · JPL
55464	2001 TG_{165}	—	October 15, 2001	Palomar	NEAT	·	3.8 km	MPC · JPL
55465	2001 TS_{167}	—	October 15, 2001	Socorro	LINEAR	·	6.0 km	MPC · JPL
55466	2001 TM_{168}	—	October 15, 2001	Socorro	LINEAR	·	9.3 km	MPC · JPL
55467	2001 TH_{173}	—	October 13, 2001	Socorro	LINEAR	·	2.4 km	MPC · JPL
55468	2001 TE_{195}	—	October 15, 2001	Palomar	NEAT	·	4.1 km	MPC · JPL
55469	2001 TT_{205}	—	October 11, 2001	Socorro	LINEAR	EUN	3.0 km	MPC · JPL
55470	2001 TS_{226}	—	October 14, 2001	Palomar	NEAT	URS · slow	8.1 km	MPC · JPL
55471	2001 TZ_{226}	—	October 15, 2001	Palomar	NEAT	·	11 km	MPC · JPL
55472	2001 TJ_{227}	—	October 15, 2001	Socorro	LINEAR	MAR	3.2 km	MPC · JPL
55473	2001 TK_{227}	—	October 15, 2001	Socorro	LINEAR	·	4.4 km	MPC · JPL
55474	2001 TY_{229}	—	October 15, 2001	Palomar	NEAT	L5	21 km	MPC · JPL
55475	2001 TO_{233}	—	October 15, 2001	Palomar	NEAT	·	4.5 km	MPC · JPL
55476	2001 TS_{239}	—	October 15, 2001	Haleakala	NEAT	·	14 km	MPC · JPL
55477 Soroban	2001 UC_{1}	Soroban	October 18, 2001	Shishikui	Maeno, H.	·	8.1 km	MPC · JPL
55478	2001 UH_{7}	—	October 17, 2001	Socorro	LINEAR	·	3.5 km	MPC · JPL
55479	2001 UO_{15}	—	October 25, 2001	Desert Eagle	W. K. Y. Yeung	EUN	3.6 km	MPC · JPL
55480	2001 UO_{20}	—	October 17, 2001	Palomar	NEAT	·	3.7 km	MPC · JPL
55481	2001 UN_{21}	—	October 17, 2001	Socorro	LINEAR	·	6.6 km	MPC · JPL
55482	2001 UJ_{22}	—	October 17, 2001	Socorro	LINEAR	·	3.0 km	MPC · JPL
55483	2001 UD_{23}	—	October 18, 2001	Socorro	LINEAR	CYB	13 km	MPC · JPL
55484	2001 UC_{24}	—	October 18, 2001	Socorro	LINEAR	EUN	6.1 km	MPC · JPL
55485	2001 UM_{25}	—	October 18, 2001	Socorro	LINEAR	·	5.2 km	MPC · JPL
55486	2001 UR_{33}	—	October 16, 2001	Socorro	LINEAR	V	2.9 km	MPC · JPL
55487	2001 UR_{35}	—	October 16, 2001	Socorro	LINEAR	VER	4.4 km	MPC · JPL
55488	2001 UZ_{44}	—	October 17, 2001	Socorro	LINEAR	·	5.9 km	MPC · JPL
55489	2001 UX_{45}	—	October 17, 2001	Socorro	LINEAR	·	2.5 km	MPC · JPL
55490	2001 UZ_{45}	—	October 17, 2001	Socorro	LINEAR	NYS	6.0 km	MPC · JPL
55491	2001 UU_{46}	—	October 17, 2001	Socorro	LINEAR	THM	7.7 km	MPC · JPL
55492	2001 UZ_{47}	—	October 17, 2001	Socorro	LINEAR	·	3.0 km	MPC · JPL
55493	2001 UX_{48}	—	October 17, 2001	Socorro	LINEAR	EUN	5.5 km	MPC · JPL
55494	2001 UG_{50}	—	October 17, 2001	Socorro	LINEAR	EOS	5.6 km	MPC · JPL
55495	2001 UY_{53}	—	October 17, 2001	Socorro	LINEAR	EOS · slow	4.3 km	MPC · JPL
55496	2001 UC_{73}	—	October 16, 2001	Socorro	LINEAR	L5	20 km	MPC · JPL
55497	2001 UA_{83}	—	October 20, 2001	Socorro	LINEAR	KOR	3.0 km	MPC · JPL
55498	2001 UT_{83}	—	October 20, 2001	Socorro	LINEAR	3:2	9.6 km	MPC · JPL
55499	2001 UE_{84}	—	October 20, 2001	Socorro	LINEAR	GEF	4.6 km	MPC · JPL
55500	2001 UK_{90}	—	October 21, 2001	Kitt Peak	Spacewatch	·	4.1 km	MPC · JPL

== 55501–55600 ==
back to top

Designation			Discovery			Properties		Ref
Permanent	Provisional	Named after	Date	Site	Discoverer(s)	Category	Diam.	Ref
55501	2001 UH_{92}	—	October 18, 2001	Palomar	NEAT	·	4.3 km	MPC · JPL
55502	2001 UK_{93}	—	October 19, 2001	Haleakala	NEAT	EOS	4.9 km	MPC · JPL
55503	2001 UC_{100}	—	October 17, 2001	Socorro	LINEAR	·	4.0 km	MPC · JPL
55504	2001 UG_{112}	—	October 21, 2001	Socorro	LINEAR	·	3.4 km	MPC · JPL
55505	2001 UK_{113}	—	October 22, 2001	Socorro	LINEAR	3:2 · SHU	13 km	MPC · JPL
55506	2001 UZ_{116}	—	October 22, 2001	Socorro	LINEAR	·	2.9 km	MPC · JPL
55507	2001 UG_{122}	—	October 22, 2001	Socorro	LINEAR	·	3.4 km	MPC · JPL
55508	2001 UE_{124}	—	October 22, 2001	Palomar	NEAT	·	8.2 km	MPC · JPL
55509	2001 UA_{140}	—	October 23, 2001	Socorro	LINEAR	KOR	2.6 km	MPC · JPL
55510	2001 UU_{160}	—	October 23, 2001	Socorro	LINEAR	EOS	5.0 km	MPC · JPL
55511	2001 US_{177}	—	October 21, 2001	Socorro	LINEAR	·	4.4 km	MPC · JPL
55512	2001 UU_{178}	—	October 23, 2001	Palomar	NEAT	·	6.4 km	MPC · JPL
55513	2001 UL_{182}	—	October 16, 2001	Palomar	NEAT	·	2.9 km	MPC · JPL
55514	2001 VJ_{6}	—	November 9, 2001	Socorro	LINEAR	·	5.6 km	MPC · JPL
55515	2001 VS_{18}	—	November 9, 2001	Socorro	LINEAR	·	5.0 km	MPC · JPL
55516	2001 VE_{24}	—	November 9, 2001	Socorro	LINEAR	THM	5.2 km	MPC · JPL
55517	2001 VE_{29}	—	November 9, 2001	Socorro	LINEAR	·	6.2 km	MPC · JPL
55518	2001 VR_{40}	—	November 9, 2001	Socorro	LINEAR	NYS	2.4 km	MPC · JPL
55519	2001 VA_{43}	—	November 9, 2001	Socorro	LINEAR	PHO	7.8 km	MPC · JPL
55520	2001 VM_{44}	—	November 9, 2001	Socorro	LINEAR	MAR	4.2 km	MPC · JPL
55521	2001 VG_{49}	—	November 10, 2001	Socorro	LINEAR	·	5.8 km	MPC · JPL
55522	2001 VY_{50}	—	November 10, 2001	Socorro	LINEAR	·	6.9 km	MPC · JPL
55523	2001 VB_{51}	—	November 10, 2001	Socorro	LINEAR	·	6.8 km	MPC · JPL
55524	2001 VP_{55}	—	November 10, 2001	Socorro	LINEAR	·	7.1 km	MPC · JPL
55525	2001 VW_{55}	—	November 10, 2001	Socorro	LINEAR	EOS	4.0 km	MPC · JPL
55526	2001 VV_{58}	—	November 10, 2001	Socorro	LINEAR	EOS	4.8 km	MPC · JPL
55527	2001 VN_{59}	—	November 10, 2001	Socorro	LINEAR	·	4.0 km	MPC · JPL
55528	2001 VF_{77}	—	November 8, 2001	Palomar	NEAT	EUN	4.2 km	MPC · JPL
55529	2001 VC_{88}	—	November 12, 2001	Haleakala	NEAT	·	6.4 km	MPC · JPL
55530	2001 VV_{93}	—	November 15, 2001	Socorro	LINEAR	·	9.8 km	MPC · JPL
55531	2001 VL_{121}	—	November 15, 2001	Palomar	NEAT	EOS	5.2 km	MPC · JPL
55532	2001 WG_{2}	—	November 18, 2001	Socorro	LINEAR	APO +1km	1.3 km	MPC · JPL
55533	2001 WN_{8}	—	November 17, 2001	Socorro	LINEAR	HYG	6.4 km	MPC · JPL
55534	2001 WU_{23}	—	November 17, 2001	Kitt Peak	Spacewatch	THM	5.1 km	MPC · JPL
55535	2001 WD_{27}	—	November 17, 2001	Socorro	LINEAR	slow	3.8 km	MPC · JPL
55536	2001 WQ_{29}	—	November 17, 2001	Socorro	LINEAR	GEF	2.9 km	MPC · JPL
55537	2001 WM_{37}	—	November 17, 2001	Socorro	LINEAR	EOS	4.3 km	MPC · JPL
55538	2001 WX_{39}	—	November 17, 2001	Socorro	LINEAR	·	10 km	MPC · JPL
55539	2001 WV_{41}	—	November 18, 2001	Socorro	LINEAR	·	7.5 km	MPC · JPL
55540	2001 WC_{45}	—	November 19, 2001	Socorro	LINEAR	·	6.7 km	MPC · JPL
55541	2001 WV_{47}	—	November 19, 2001	Anderson Mesa	LONEOS	·	3.3 km	MPC · JPL
55542	2001 XO_{5}	—	December 7, 2001	Socorro	LINEAR	PHO	2.8 km	MPC · JPL
55543 Nemeghaire	2001 XN_{16}	Nemeghaire	December 8, 2001	Uccle	H. M. J. Boffin	EUN	3.9 km	MPC · JPL
55544	2001 XW_{24}	—	December 10, 2001	Socorro	LINEAR	·	3.0 km	MPC · JPL
55545	2001 XY_{34}	—	December 9, 2001	Socorro	LINEAR	·	4.7 km	MPC · JPL
55546	2001 XQ_{48}	—	December 10, 2001	Socorro	LINEAR	·	6.0 km	MPC · JPL
55547	2001 XA_{49}	—	December 10, 2001	Socorro	LINEAR	·	6.0 km	MPC · JPL
55548	2001 XB_{50}	—	December 10, 2001	Socorro	LINEAR	·	2.1 km	MPC · JPL
55549	2001 XC_{59}	—	December 10, 2001	Socorro	LINEAR	·	4.2 km	MPC · JPL
55550	2001 XW_{70}	—	December 11, 2001	Socorro	LINEAR	EUN	2.9 km	MPC · JPL
55551	2001 XZ_{88}	—	December 10, 2001	Socorro	LINEAR	·	7.1 km	MPC · JPL
55552	2001 XN_{106}	—	December 10, 2001	Socorro	LINEAR	·	6.3 km	MPC · JPL
55553	2001 XE_{257}	—	December 7, 2001	Socorro	LINEAR	·	5.2 km	MPC · JPL
55554	2001 XY_{257}	—	December 7, 2001	Palomar	NEAT	EUN	3.9 km	MPC · JPL
55555 DNA	2001 YR_{2}	DNA	December 19, 2001	Fountain Hills	C. W. Juels, P. R. Holvorcem	·	5.5 km	MPC · JPL
55556	2001 YJ_{34}	—	December 18, 2001	Socorro	LINEAR	·	8.3 km	MPC · JPL
55557	2001 YH_{53}	—	December 18, 2001	Socorro	LINEAR	V · slow	2.1 km	MPC · JPL
55558	2001 YL_{101}	—	December 17, 2001	Socorro	LINEAR	·	9.8 km	MPC · JPL
55559 Briancraine	2001 YS_{110}	Briancraine	December 18, 2001	Goodricke-Pigott	R. A. Tucker	·	5.8 km	MPC · JPL
55560	2001 YB_{136}	—	December 22, 2001	Socorro	LINEAR	·	8.0 km	MPC · JPL
55561 Madenberg	2002 AF_{9}	Madenberg	January 9, 2002	Desert Moon	Stevens, B. L.	·	1.6 km	MPC · JPL
55562	2002 AM_{29}	—	January 8, 2002	Socorro	LINEAR	·	5.3 km	MPC · JPL
55563	2002 AW_{34}	—	January 12, 2002	Haleakala	NEAT	L4	27 km	MPC · JPL
55564	2002 AQ_{188}	—	January 10, 2002	Palomar	NEAT	·	10 km	MPC · JPL
55565 Aya	2002 AW_{197}	Aya	January 10, 2002	Palomar	Palomar	cubewano (hot)	768 km	MPC · JPL
55566	2002 BZ_{25}	—	January 26, 2002	Socorro	LINEAR	HNS	6.5 km	MPC · JPL
55567	2002 CS_{6}	—	February 1, 2002	Socorro	LINEAR	PHO	4.2 km	MPC · JPL
55568	2002 CU_{15}	—	February 8, 2002	Fountain Hills	C. W. Juels, P. R. Holvorcem	L4	28 km	MPC · JPL
55569	2002 CZ_{61}	—	February 6, 2002	Socorro	LINEAR	CLO	5.8 km	MPC · JPL
55570	2002 CV_{78}	—	February 7, 2002	Socorro	LINEAR	·	2.1 km	MPC · JPL
55571	2002 CP_{82}	—	February 7, 2002	Socorro	LINEAR	L4	14 km	MPC · JPL
55572	2002 CN_{140}	—	February 8, 2002	Socorro	LINEAR	·	4.1 km	MPC · JPL
55573	2002 CQ_{172}	—	February 8, 2002	Socorro	LINEAR	·	2.7 km	MPC · JPL
55574	2002 CF_{245}	—	February 13, 2002	Socorro	LINEAR	L4	19 km	MPC · JPL
55575	2002 DC_{16}	—	February 16, 2002	Haleakala	NEAT	·	9.7 km	MPC · JPL
55576 Amycus	2002 GB_{10}	Amycus	April 8, 2002	Palomar	NEAT	centaur	101 km	MPC · JPL
55577	2002 GY_{94}	—	April 9, 2002	Socorro	LINEAR	·	1.8 km	MPC · JPL
55578	2002 GK_{105}	—	April 11, 2002	Anderson Mesa	LONEOS	L4	22 km	MPC · JPL
55579	2002 JM_{51}	—	May 9, 2002	Socorro	LINEAR	·	3.4 km	MPC · JPL
55580	2002 JB_{110}	—	May 11, 2002	Socorro	LINEAR	·	9.1 km	MPC · JPL
55581	2002 NH	—	July 1, 2002	Palomar	NEAT	·	1.4 km	MPC · JPL
55582	2002 PM_{42}	—	August 5, 2002	Socorro	LINEAR	DOR	7.2 km	MPC · JPL
55583	2002 PQ_{42}	—	August 5, 2002	Socorro	LINEAR	PHO	2.2 km	MPC · JPL
55584	2002 PV_{44}	—	August 5, 2002	Socorro	LINEAR	·	6.6 km	MPC · JPL
55585	2002 PQ_{45}	—	August 5, 2002	Socorro	LINEAR	(883)	1.9 km	MPC · JPL
55586	2002 PT_{47}	—	August 10, 2002	Socorro	LINEAR	·	4.1 km	MPC · JPL
55587	2002 PD_{50}	—	August 10, 2002	Socorro	LINEAR	V	2.5 km	MPC · JPL
55588	2002 PV_{81}	—	August 9, 2002	Socorro	LINEAR	·	6.9 km	MPC · JPL
55589	2002 PO_{93}	—	August 14, 2002	Palomar	NEAT	PHO	2.5 km	MPC · JPL
55590	2002 PB_{97}	—	August 14, 2002	Socorro	LINEAR	·	3.0 km	MPC · JPL
55591	2002 PD_{116}	—	August 13, 2002	Socorro	LINEAR	EOS	6.2 km	MPC · JPL
55592	2002 PY_{128}	—	August 14, 2002	Socorro	LINEAR	·	6.1 km	MPC · JPL
55593	2002 RM_{20}	—	September 4, 2002	Anderson Mesa	LONEOS	·	4.2 km	MPC · JPL
55594	2002 RE_{62}	—	September 5, 2002	Socorro	LINEAR	·	3.7 km	MPC · JPL
55595	2002 RL_{63}	—	September 5, 2002	Socorro	LINEAR	·	1.7 km	MPC · JPL
55596	2002 RV_{65}	—	September 5, 2002	Socorro	LINEAR	·	4.3 km	MPC · JPL
55597	2002 RO_{66}	—	September 7, 2002	Ametlla de Mar	J. Nomen	V	1.6 km	MPC · JPL
55598	2002 RF_{99}	—	September 5, 2002	Socorro	LINEAR	·	5.5 km	MPC · JPL
55599	2002 RP_{100}	—	September 5, 2002	Socorro	LINEAR	·	4.3 km	MPC · JPL
55600	2002 RO_{106}	—	September 5, 2002	Socorro	LINEAR	EUN	3.7 km	MPC · JPL

== 55601–55700 ==
back to top

Designation			Discovery			Properties		Ref
Permanent	Provisional	Named after	Date	Site	Discoverer(s)	Category	Diam.	Ref
55601	2002 RC_{110}	—	September 6, 2002	Socorro	LINEAR	·	5.8 km	MPC · JPL
55602	2002 RT_{116}	—	September 7, 2002	Socorro	LINEAR	·	8.0 km	MPC · JPL
55603	2002 RE_{117}	—	September 7, 2002	Ondřejov	P. Kušnirák, P. Pravec	·	3.3 km	MPC · JPL
55604	2002 RS_{135}	—	September 10, 2002	Palomar	NEAT	·	6.2 km	MPC · JPL
55605	2002 RW_{139}	—	September 10, 2002	Palomar	NEAT	PHO	2.9 km	MPC · JPL
55606	2002 RN_{154}	—	September 10, 2002	Haleakala	NEAT	·	4.3 km	MPC · JPL
55607	2002 RV_{183}	—	September 11, 2002	Palomar	NEAT	·	14 km	MPC · JPL
55608	2002 SO_{1}	—	September 26, 2002	Palomar	NEAT	·	8.8 km	MPC · JPL
55609	2002 SC_{9}	—	September 27, 2002	Palomar	NEAT	·	2.9 km	MPC · JPL
55610	2002 SO_{40}	—	September 30, 2002	Haleakala	NEAT	·	5.4 km	MPC · JPL
55611	2002 SR_{50}	—	September 30, 2002	Haleakala	NEAT	EOS	4.8 km	MPC · JPL
55612	2002 TW_{49}	—	October 2, 2002	Socorro	LINEAR	·	1.9 km	MPC · JPL
55613	2002 TY_{49}	—	October 2, 2002	Socorro	LINEAR	·	5.8 km	MPC · JPL
55614	2002 TJ_{59}	—	October 4, 2002	Ametlla de Mar	J. Nomen	EMA	11 km	MPC · JPL
55615	2002 TL_{65}	—	October 4, 2002	Socorro	LINEAR	·	4.9 km	MPC · JPL
55616	2002 TA_{78}	—	October 1, 2002	Anderson Mesa	LONEOS	·	6.9 km	MPC · JPL
55617	2002 TF_{79}	—	October 1, 2002	Socorro	LINEAR	EOS	5.9 km	MPC · JPL
55618	2002 TB_{81}	—	October 1, 2002	Socorro	LINEAR	·	3.3 km	MPC · JPL
55619	2002 TM_{108}	—	October 1, 2002	Socorro	LINEAR	·	8.0 km	MPC · JPL
55620	2002 TK_{121}	—	October 3, 2002	Palomar	NEAT	·	2.2 km	MPC · JPL
55621	2002 TQ_{138}	—	October 4, 2002	Anderson Mesa	LONEOS	EOS	6.9 km	MPC · JPL
55622	2002 TY_{143}	—	October 4, 2002	Socorro	LINEAR	·	4.8 km	MPC · JPL
55623	2002 TZ_{158}	—	October 5, 2002	Palomar	NEAT	·	4.6 km	MPC · JPL
55624	2002 TE_{196}	—	October 3, 2002	Socorro	LINEAR	·	3.9 km	MPC · JPL
55625	2002 TF_{196}	—	October 3, 2002	Socorro	LINEAR	MAR	4.5 km	MPC · JPL
55626	2002 TN_{206}	—	October 4, 2002	Socorro	LINEAR	·	1.9 km	MPC · JPL
55627	2002 TW_{232}	—	October 6, 2002	Socorro	LINEAR	·	9.8 km	MPC · JPL
55628	2002 TN_{249}	—	October 7, 2002	Socorro	LINEAR	NYS	3.0 km	MPC · JPL
55629	2002 TJ_{251}	—	October 7, 2002	Haleakala	NEAT	EUN	2.7 km	MPC · JPL
55630	2002 TD_{261}	—	October 9, 2002	Socorro	LINEAR	MAR	3.6 km	MPC · JPL
55631	2002 TX_{281}	—	October 10, 2002	Socorro	LINEAR	·	4.6 km	MPC · JPL
55632	2002 TR_{282}	—	October 10, 2002	Socorro	LINEAR	·	4.2 km	MPC · JPL
55633	2002 TU_{283}	—	October 10, 2002	Socorro	LINEAR	V	2.0 km	MPC · JPL
55634	2002 TH_{284}	—	October 10, 2002	Socorro	LINEAR	·	2.3 km	MPC · JPL
55635	2002 TK_{284}	—	October 10, 2002	Socorro	LINEAR	·	6.1 km	MPC · JPL
55636	2002 TX_{300}	—	October 15, 2002	Palomar	NEAT	Haumea	286 km	MPC · JPL
55637 Uni	2002 UX_{25}	Uni	October 30, 2002	Kitt Peak	Spacewatch	cubewano (hot) · moon	664 km	MPC · JPL
55638	2002 VE_{95}	—	November 14, 2002	Palomar	NEAT	plutino	250 km	MPC · JPL
55639	2070 P-L	—	September 24, 1960	Palomar	C. J. van Houten, I. van Houten-Groeneveld, T. Gehrels	PAD	6.1 km	MPC · JPL
55640	2114 P-L	—	September 24, 1960	Palomar	C. J. van Houten, I. van Houten-Groeneveld, T. Gehrels	·	3.2 km	MPC · JPL
55641	2125 P-L	—	September 24, 1960	Palomar	C. J. van Houten, I. van Houten-Groeneveld, T. Gehrels	·	3.2 km	MPC · JPL
55642	2138 P-L	—	September 24, 1960	Palomar	C. J. van Houten, I. van Houten-Groeneveld, T. Gehrels	·	2.7 km	MPC · JPL
55643	2179 P-L	—	September 24, 1960	Palomar	C. J. van Houten, I. van Houten-Groeneveld, T. Gehrels	·	6.6 km	MPC · JPL
55644	2582 P-L	—	September 24, 1960	Palomar	C. J. van Houten, I. van Houten-Groeneveld, T. Gehrels	·	3.8 km	MPC · JPL
55645	2625 P-L	—	September 24, 1960	Palomar	C. J. van Houten, I. van Houten-Groeneveld, T. Gehrels	·	2.5 km	MPC · JPL
55646	2637 P-L	—	September 24, 1960	Palomar	C. J. van Houten, I. van Houten-Groeneveld, T. Gehrels	·	3.3 km	MPC · JPL
55647	2676 P-L	—	September 24, 1960	Palomar	C. J. van Houten, I. van Houten-Groeneveld, T. Gehrels	·	2.7 km	MPC · JPL
55648	2786 P-L	—	September 26, 1960	Palomar	C. J. van Houten, I. van Houten-Groeneveld, T. Gehrels	EUN	2.8 km	MPC · JPL
55649	3023 P-L	—	September 24, 1960	Palomar	C. J. van Houten, I. van Houten-Groeneveld, T. Gehrels	·	5.1 km	MPC · JPL
55650	3536 P-L	—	October 17, 1960	Palomar	C. J. van Houten, I. van Houten-Groeneveld, T. Gehrels	·	2.8 km	MPC · JPL
55651	4043 P-L	—	September 24, 1960	Palomar	C. J. van Houten, I. van Houten-Groeneveld, T. Gehrels	EOS	4.5 km	MPC · JPL
55652	4048 P-L	—	September 24, 1960	Palomar	C. J. van Houten, I. van Houten-Groeneveld, T. Gehrels	·	8.0 km	MPC · JPL
55653	4088 P-L	—	September 24, 1960	Palomar	C. J. van Houten, I. van Houten-Groeneveld, T. Gehrels	(5)	3.0 km	MPC · JPL
55654	4093 P-L	—	September 24, 1960	Palomar	C. J. van Houten, I. van Houten-Groeneveld, T. Gehrels	·	5.3 km	MPC · JPL
55655	4101 P-L	—	September 24, 1960	Palomar	C. J. van Houten, I. van Houten-Groeneveld, T. Gehrels	·	5.9 km	MPC · JPL
55656	4708 P-L	—	September 24, 1960	Palomar	C. J. van Houten, I. van Houten-Groeneveld, T. Gehrels	·	2.8 km	MPC · JPL
55657	4905 P-L	—	September 24, 1960	Palomar	C. J. van Houten, I. van Houten-Groeneveld, T. Gehrels	NYS	2.2 km	MPC · JPL
55658	6061 P-L	—	September 24, 1960	Palomar	C. J. van Houten, I. van Houten-Groeneveld, T. Gehrels	NYS	3.4 km	MPC · JPL
55659	6110 P-L	—	September 24, 1960	Palomar	C. J. van Houten, I. van Houten-Groeneveld, T. Gehrels	·	1.9 km	MPC · JPL
55660	6119 P-L	—	September 24, 1960	Palomar	C. J. van Houten, I. van Houten-Groeneveld, T. Gehrels	·	2.2 km	MPC · JPL
55661	6184 P-L	—	September 24, 1960	Palomar	C. J. van Houten, I. van Houten-Groeneveld, T. Gehrels	·	1.7 km	MPC · JPL
55662	6224 P-L	—	September 24, 1960	Palomar	C. J. van Houten, I. van Houten-Groeneveld, T. Gehrels	PAD	3.7 km	MPC · JPL
55663	6247 P-L	—	September 24, 1960	Palomar	C. J. van Houten, I. van Houten-Groeneveld, T. Gehrels	·	1.9 km	MPC · JPL
55664	6281 P-L	—	September 24, 1960	Palomar	C. J. van Houten, I. van Houten-Groeneveld, T. Gehrels	·	2.1 km	MPC · JPL
55665	6527 P-L	—	September 24, 1960	Palomar	C. J. van Houten, I. van Houten-Groeneveld, T. Gehrels	MAS	2.0 km	MPC · JPL
55666	6631 P-L	—	September 24, 1960	Palomar	C. J. van Houten, I. van Houten-Groeneveld, T. Gehrels	·	1.7 km	MPC · JPL
55667	6691 P-L	—	September 24, 1960	Palomar	C. J. van Houten, I. van Houten-Groeneveld, T. Gehrels	·	2.7 km	MPC · JPL
55668	6722 P-L	—	September 24, 1960	Palomar	C. J. van Houten, I. van Houten-Groeneveld, T. Gehrels	·	1.8 km	MPC · JPL
55669	6810 P-L	—	September 24, 1960	Palomar	C. J. van Houten, I. van Houten-Groeneveld, T. Gehrels	·	2.1 km	MPC · JPL
55670	9581 P-L	—	October 17, 1960	Palomar	C. J. van Houten, I. van Houten-Groeneveld, T. Gehrels	·	5.4 km	MPC · JPL
55671	9587 P-L	—	October 17, 1960	Palomar	C. J. van Houten, I. van Houten-Groeneveld, T. Gehrels	HOF · fast	6.4 km	MPC · JPL
55672	1049 T-1	—	March 25, 1971	Palomar	C. J. van Houten, I. van Houten-Groeneveld, T. Gehrels	·	3.4 km	MPC · JPL
55673	1150 T-1	—	March 25, 1971	Palomar	C. J. van Houten, I. van Houten-Groeneveld, T. Gehrels	·	3.0 km	MPC · JPL
55674	2112 T-1	—	March 25, 1971	Palomar	C. J. van Houten, I. van Houten-Groeneveld, T. Gehrels	V	1.5 km	MPC · JPL
55675	2316 T-1	—	March 25, 1971	Palomar	C. J. van Houten, I. van Houten-Groeneveld, T. Gehrels	NYS	1.9 km	MPC · JPL
55676 Klythios	3034 T-1	Klythios	March 26, 1971	Palomar	C. J. van Houten, I. van Houten-Groeneveld, T. Gehrels	L5	13 km	MPC · JPL
55677	3201 T-1	—	March 26, 1971	Palomar	C. J. van Houten, I. van Houten-Groeneveld, T. Gehrels	DOR	8.8 km	MPC · JPL
55678 Lampos	3291 T-1	Lampos	March 26, 1971	Palomar	C. J. van Houten, I. van Houten-Groeneveld, T. Gehrels	L5	18 km	MPC · JPL
55679	4230 T-1	—	March 26, 1971	Palomar	C. J. van Houten, I. van Houten-Groeneveld, T. Gehrels	NYS	2.3 km	MPC · JPL
55680	4289 T-1	—	March 26, 1971	Palomar	C. J. van Houten, I. van Houten-Groeneveld, T. Gehrels	·	2.9 km	MPC · JPL
55681	1143 T-2	—	September 29, 1973	Palomar	C. J. van Houten, I. van Houten-Groeneveld, T. Gehrels	·	1.5 km	MPC · JPL
55682	1303 T-2	—	September 29, 1973	Palomar	C. J. van Houten, I. van Houten-Groeneveld, T. Gehrels	HYG	6.3 km	MPC · JPL
55683	1361 T-2	—	September 29, 1973	Palomar	C. J. van Houten, I. van Houten-Groeneveld, T. Gehrels	·	3.5 km	MPC · JPL
55684	1510 T-2	—	September 30, 1973	Palomar	C. J. van Houten, I. van Houten-Groeneveld, T. Gehrels	·	5.6 km	MPC · JPL
55685	2030 T-2	—	September 29, 1973	Palomar	C. J. van Houten, I. van Houten-Groeneveld, T. Gehrels	·	2.3 km	MPC · JPL
55686	2041 T-2	—	September 29, 1973	Palomar	C. J. van Houten, I. van Houten-Groeneveld, T. Gehrels	·	1.9 km	MPC · JPL
55687	2049 T-2	—	September 29, 1973	Palomar	C. J. van Houten, I. van Houten-Groeneveld, T. Gehrels	·	2.7 km	MPC · JPL
55688	2053 T-2	—	September 29, 1973	Palomar	C. J. van Houten, I. van Houten-Groeneveld, T. Gehrels	DOR	6.5 km	MPC · JPL
55689	2237 T-2	—	September 29, 1973	Palomar	C. J. van Houten, I. van Houten-Groeneveld, T. Gehrels	·	3.2 km	MPC · JPL
55690	2696 T-2	—	September 29, 1973	Palomar	C. J. van Houten, I. van Houten-Groeneveld, T. Gehrels	·	4.2 km	MPC · JPL
55691	3028 T-2	—	September 30, 1973	Palomar	C. J. van Houten, I. van Houten-Groeneveld, T. Gehrels	KOR	3.3 km	MPC · JPL
55692	3118 T-2	—	September 30, 1973	Palomar	C. J. van Houten, I. van Houten-Groeneveld, T. Gehrels	·	2.7 km	MPC · JPL
55693	4149 T-2	—	September 29, 1973	Palomar	C. J. van Houten, I. van Houten-Groeneveld, T. Gehrels	·	2.0 km	MPC · JPL
55694	4199 T-2	—	September 29, 1973	Palomar	C. J. van Houten, I. van Houten-Groeneveld, T. Gehrels	·	2.4 km	MPC · JPL
55695	4225 T-2	—	September 29, 1973	Palomar	C. J. van Houten, I. van Houten-Groeneveld, T. Gehrels	·	2.0 km	MPC · JPL
55696	4227 T-2	—	September 29, 1973	Palomar	C. J. van Houten, I. van Houten-Groeneveld, T. Gehrels	HYG	7.4 km	MPC · JPL
55697	4233 T-2	—	September 29, 1973	Palomar	C. J. van Houten, I. van Houten-Groeneveld, T. Gehrels	(5)	1.9 km	MPC · JPL
55698	4301 T-2	—	September 29, 1973	Palomar	C. J. van Houten, I. van Houten-Groeneveld, T. Gehrels	HYG	5.5 km	MPC · JPL
55699	5396 T-2	—	September 30, 1973	Palomar	C. J. van Houten, I. van Houten-Groeneveld, T. Gehrels	EUN	3.0 km	MPC · JPL
55700	1092 T-3	—	October 17, 1977	Palomar	C. J. van Houten, I. van Houten-Groeneveld, T. Gehrels	·	1.6 km	MPC · JPL

== 55701–55800 ==
back to top

Designation			Discovery			Properties		Ref
Permanent	Provisional	Named after	Date	Site	Discoverer(s)	Category	Diam.	Ref
55701 Ukalegon	1193 T-3	Ukalegon	October 17, 1977	Palomar	C. J. van Houten, I. van Houten-Groeneveld, T. Gehrels	L5	20 km	MPC · JPL
55702 Thymoitos	1302 T-3	Thymoitos	October 17, 1977	Palomar	C. J. van Houten, I. van Houten-Groeneveld, T. Gehrels	L5	20 km	MPC · JPL
55703	2032 T-3	—	October 16, 1977	Palomar	C. J. van Houten, I. van Houten-Groeneveld, T. Gehrels	·	5.4 km	MPC · JPL
55704	2165 T-3	—	October 16, 1977	Palomar	C. J. van Houten, I. van Houten-Groeneveld, T. Gehrels	·	4.5 km	MPC · JPL
55705	2190 T-3	—	October 16, 1977	Palomar	C. J. van Houten, I. van Houten-Groeneveld, T. Gehrels	·	2.5 km	MPC · JPL
55706	2241 T-3	—	October 16, 1977	Palomar	C. J. van Houten, I. van Houten-Groeneveld, T. Gehrels	·	2.3 km	MPC · JPL
55707	2246 T-3	—	October 16, 1977	Palomar	C. J. van Houten, I. van Houten-Groeneveld, T. Gehrels	·	3.4 km	MPC · JPL
55708	2288 T-3	—	October 16, 1977	Palomar	C. J. van Houten, I. van Houten-Groeneveld, T. Gehrels	·	2.6 km	MPC · JPL
55709	2434 T-3	—	October 16, 1977	Palomar	C. J. van Houten, I. van Houten-Groeneveld, T. Gehrels	(2076)	3.1 km	MPC · JPL
55710	3081 T-3	—	October 16, 1977	Palomar	C. J. van Houten, I. van Houten-Groeneveld, T. Gehrels	KOR	2.9 km	MPC · JPL
55711	3122 T-3	—	October 16, 1977	Palomar	C. J. van Houten, I. van Houten-Groeneveld, T. Gehrels	·	2.5 km	MPC · JPL
55712	3174 T-3	—	October 16, 1977	Palomar	C. J. van Houten, I. van Houten-Groeneveld, T. Gehrels	KOR	2.6 km	MPC · JPL
55713	3463 T-3	—	October 16, 1977	Palomar	C. J. van Houten, I. van Houten-Groeneveld, T. Gehrels	·	2.2 km	MPC · JPL
55714	3491 T-3	—	October 16, 1977	Palomar	C. J. van Houten, I. van Houten-Groeneveld, T. Gehrels	·	1.8 km	MPC · JPL
55715	3536 T-3	—	October 16, 1977	Palomar	C. J. van Houten, I. van Houten-Groeneveld, T. Gehrels	·	2.0 km	MPC · JPL
55716	4249 T-3	—	October 16, 1977	Palomar	C. J. van Houten, I. van Houten-Groeneveld, T. Gehrels	·	3.0 km	MPC · JPL
55717	5027 T-3	—	October 16, 1977	Palomar	C. J. van Houten, I. van Houten-Groeneveld, T. Gehrels	(2076)	1.8 km	MPC · JPL
55718	5096 T-3	—	October 16, 1977	Palomar	C. J. van Houten, I. van Houten-Groeneveld, T. Gehrels	·	2.0 km	MPC · JPL
55719	5131 T-3	—	October 16, 1977	Palomar	C. J. van Houten, I. van Houten-Groeneveld, T. Gehrels	V	1.7 km	MPC · JPL
55720 Daandehoop	1972 RE	Daandehoop	September 15, 1972	Palomar	T. Gehrels	H	1.6 km	MPC · JPL
55721	1978 UX_{4}	—	October 27, 1978	Palomar	C. M. Olmstead	·	2.9 km	MPC · JPL
55722	1978 VU_{3}	—	November 7, 1978	Palomar	E. F. Helin, S. J. Bus	·	3.9 km	MPC · JPL
55723	1979 MP_{2}	—	June 25, 1979	Siding Spring	E. F. Helin, S. J. Bus	EOS	4.6 km	MPC · JPL
55724	1979 MB_{5}	—	June 25, 1979	Siding Spring	E. F. Helin, S. J. Bus	·	4.2 km	MPC · JPL
55725	1979 MG_{5}	—	June 25, 1979	Siding Spring	E. F. Helin, S. J. Bus	·	3.2 km	MPC · JPL
55726	1979 MG_{8}	—	June 25, 1979	Siding Spring	E. F. Helin, S. J. Bus	·	7.5 km	MPC · JPL
55727	1981 ED_{5}	—	March 2, 1981	Siding Spring	S. J. Bus	·	3.4 km	MPC · JPL
55728	1981 EV_{17}	—	March 2, 1981	Siding Spring	S. J. Bus	NYS	2.7 km	MPC · JPL
55729	1981 ER_{30}	—	March 2, 1981	Siding Spring	S. J. Bus	·	5.3 km	MPC · JPL
55730	1981 EM_{33}	—	March 1, 1981	Siding Spring	S. J. Bus	·	5.7 km	MPC · JPL
55731	1981 EO_{37}	—	March 1, 1981	Siding Spring	S. J. Bus	·	3.5 km	MPC · JPL
55732	1986 QN_{2}	—	August 28, 1986	La Silla	H. Debehogne	·	5.8 km	MPC · JPL
55733 Lepsius	1986 WS_{2}	Lepsius	November 27, 1986	Tautenburg Observatory	F. Börngen	EOS	5.0 km	MPC · JPL
55734	1986 WD_{6}	—	November 27, 1986	Caussols	CERGA	·	3.8 km	MPC · JPL
55735 Magdeburg	1987 QV	Magdeburg	August 22, 1987	Tautenburg Observatory	F. Börngen	·	8.1 km	MPC · JPL
55736	1987 QC_{1}	—	August 21, 1987	Kleť	Z. Vávrová	·	12 km	MPC · JPL
55737 Coquimbo	1988 CQ_{1}	Coquimbo	February 11, 1988	La Silla	E. W. Elst	·	3.2 km	MPC · JPL
55738	1988 VG_{3}	—	November 14, 1988	Kushiro	S. Ueda, H. Kaneda	·	4.8 km	MPC · JPL
55739	1989 TV	—	October 4, 1989	Palomar	E. F. Helin	·	3.4 km	MPC · JPL
55740	1989 YL_{2}	—	December 30, 1989	Siding Spring	R. H. McNaught	CYB	8.6 km	MPC · JPL
55741	1990 QZ_{3}	—	August 22, 1990	Palomar	H. E. Holt	·	3.0 km	MPC · JPL
55742	1990 QC_{10}	—	August 16, 1990	La Silla	E. W. Elst	·	2.1 km	MPC · JPL
55743	1990 RF_{6}	—	September 9, 1990	La Silla	H. Debehogne	·	7.7 km	MPC · JPL
55744	1990 RL_{7}	—	September 13, 1990	La Silla	H. Debehogne	·	5.6 km	MPC · JPL
55745	1990 SY_{7}	—	September 22, 1990	La Silla	E. W. Elst	·	2.1 km	MPC · JPL
55746	1990 SW_{9}	—	September 22, 1990	La Silla	E. W. Elst	(1338) (FLO)	2.6 km	MPC · JPL
55747	1990 SQ_{14}	—	September 25, 1990	La Silla	H. Debehogne	H	1.4 km	MPC · JPL
55748	1990 VV_{11}	—	November 14, 1990	La Silla	E. W. Elst	·	9.9 km	MPC · JPL
55749 Eulenspiegel	1991 AT_{2}	Eulenspiegel	January 15, 1991	Tautenburg Observatory	F. Börngen	·	8.4 km	MPC · JPL
55750	1991 GP_{8}	—	April 8, 1991	La Silla	E. W. Elst	·	2.9 km	MPC · JPL
55751	1991 NM_{4}	—	July 8, 1991	La Silla	H. Debehogne	·	6.5 km	MPC · JPL
55752	1991 PD_{12}	—	August 7, 1991	Palomar	H. E. Holt	(18466)	6.8 km	MPC · JPL
55753 Raman	1991 RF_{5}	Raman	September 13, 1991	Tautenburg Observatory	F. Börngen, L. D. Schmadel	·	5.3 km	MPC · JPL
55754	1991 RP_{18}	—	September 13, 1991	Palomar	H. E. Holt	·	4.3 km	MPC · JPL
55755 Blythe	1991 TB_{15}	Blythe	October 6, 1991	Palomar	Lowe, A.	NYS	2.9 km	MPC · JPL
55756	1991 VJ_{9}	—	November 4, 1991	Kitt Peak	Spacewatch	·	7.5 km	MPC · JPL
55757	1991 XN	—	December 7, 1991	Palomar	E. F. Helin	·	2.8 km	MPC · JPL
55758	1991 XR	—	December 3, 1991	Palomar	C. S. Shoemaker	PHO	2.9 km	MPC · JPL
55759 Erdmannsdorff	1991 XJ_{1}	Erdmannsdorff	December 10, 1991	Tautenburg Observatory	F. Börngen	·	4.9 km	MPC · JPL
55760	1992 BL_{1}	—	January 30, 1992	Palomar	E. F. Helin	·	8.7 km	MPC · JPL
55761	1992 CM_{2}	—	February 2, 1992	La Silla	E. W. Elst	·	8.2 km	MPC · JPL
55762	1992 CE_{3}	—	February 2, 1992	La Silla	E. W. Elst	·	2.2 km	MPC · JPL
55763	1992 DO_{7}	—	February 29, 1992	La Silla	UESAC	·	5.6 km	MPC · JPL
55764	1992 DG_{12}	—	February 26, 1992	Kitt Peak	Spacewatch	V	1.7 km	MPC · JPL
55765	1992 EN_{4}	—	March 1, 1992	La Silla	UESAC	NYS ·	4.4 km	MPC · JPL
55766	1992 EL_{6}	—	March 1, 1992	La Silla	UESAC	·	3.9 km	MPC · JPL
55767	1992 EW_{10}	—	March 6, 1992	La Silla	UESAC	·	5.8 km	MPC · JPL
55768	1992 GH_{4}	—	April 4, 1992	La Silla	E. W. Elst	·	3.9 km	MPC · JPL
55769	1992 HJ_{5}	—	April 24, 1992	La Silla	H. Debehogne	·	3.7 km	MPC · JPL
55770	1992 OW	—	July 28, 1992	Siding Spring	R. H. McNaught	·	4.8 km	MPC · JPL
55771	1992 PD_{1}	—	August 8, 1992	Caussols	E. W. Elst	·	3.6 km	MPC · JPL
55772 Loder	1992 YB_{5}	Loder	December 30, 1992	Tautenburg Observatory	F. Börngen	·	2.2 km	MPC · JPL
55773	1993 BG_{6}	—	January 27, 1993	Caussols	E. W. Elst	·	2.2 km	MPC · JPL
55774	1993 FA_{8}	—	March 17, 1993	La Silla	UESAC	·	1.3 km	MPC · JPL
55775	1993 FY_{10}	—	March 19, 1993	La Silla	UESAC	·	2.1 km	MPC · JPL
55776	1993 FH_{14}	—	March 17, 1993	La Silla	UESAC	·	1.7 km	MPC · JPL
55777	1993 FC_{17}	—	March 19, 1993	La Silla	UESAC	·	1.6 km	MPC · JPL
55778	1993 FW_{23}	—	March 21, 1993	La Silla	UESAC	·	2.0 km	MPC · JPL
55779	1993 FX_{23}	—	March 21, 1993	La Silla	UESAC	·	5.9 km	MPC · JPL
55780	1993 FQ_{34}	—	March 19, 1993	La Silla	UESAC	·	1.7 km	MPC · JPL
55781	1993 FN_{36}	—	March 19, 1993	La Silla	UESAC	·	3.1 km	MPC · JPL
55782	1993 FF_{41}	—	March 19, 1993	La Silla	UESAC	EOS	3.6 km	MPC · JPL
55783	1993 FZ_{43}	—	March 19, 1993	La Silla	UESAC	fast	1.9 km	MPC · JPL
55784	1993 FK_{74}	—	March 21, 1993	La Silla	UESAC	·	2.2 km	MPC · JPL
55785	1993 FF_{80}	—	March 17, 1993	La Silla	UESAC	·	2.1 km	MPC · JPL
55786	1993 OE_{3}	—	July 20, 1993	La Silla	E. W. Elst	V · fast	2.6 km	MPC · JPL
55787	1993 OB_{10}	—	July 20, 1993	La Silla	E. W. Elst	·	3.1 km	MPC · JPL
55788	1993 PX_{6}	—	August 15, 1993	Caussols	E. W. Elst	·	3.0 km	MPC · JPL
55789	1993 RF_{11}	—	September 14, 1993	La Silla	H. Debehogne, E. W. Elst	·	2.7 km	MPC · JPL
55790	1993 RP_{15}	—	September 15, 1993	La Silla	H. Debehogne, E. W. Elst	PHO	5.3 km	MPC · JPL
55791	1993 SA_{2}	—	September 19, 1993	Kitami	K. Endate, K. Watanabe	·	5.4 km	MPC · JPL
55792	1993 SV_{3}	—	September 18, 1993	Palomar	H. E. Holt	·	3.3 km	MPC · JPL
55793	1993 SS_{4}	—	September 19, 1993	Caussols	E. W. Elst	·	2.4 km	MPC · JPL
55794	1993 TV_{14}	—	October 9, 1993	La Silla	E. W. Elst	·	2.3 km	MPC · JPL
55795	1993 TF_{18}	—	October 9, 1993	La Silla	E. W. Elst	(5)	3.2 km	MPC · JPL
55796	1994 AX_{13}	—	January 12, 1994	Kitt Peak	Spacewatch	·	2.9 km	MPC · JPL
55797	1994 CN_{15}	—	February 8, 1994	La Silla	E. W. Elst	·	3.4 km	MPC · JPL
55798	1994 ES_{5}	—	March 9, 1994	Caussols	E. W. Elst	·	3.2 km	MPC · JPL
55799	1994 EC_{6}	—	March 9, 1994	Caussols	E. W. Elst	·	4.7 km	MPC · JPL
55800	1994 ED_{7}	—	March 9, 1994	Caussols	E. W. Elst	·	3.6 km	MPC · JPL

== 55801–55900 ==
back to top

Designation			Discovery			Properties		Ref
Permanent	Provisional	Named after	Date	Site	Discoverer(s)	Category	Diam.	Ref
55801	1994 PV_{4}	—	August 10, 1994	La Silla	E. W. Elst	·	1.8 km	MPC · JPL
55802	1994 PM_{6}	—	August 10, 1994	La Silla	E. W. Elst	·	9.9 km	MPC · JPL
55803	1994 PD_{7}	—	August 10, 1994	La Silla	E. W. Elst	·	1.7 km	MPC · JPL
55804	1994 PD_{13}	—	August 10, 1994	La Silla	E. W. Elst	·	2.0 km	MPC · JPL
55805	1994 PE_{15}	—	August 10, 1994	La Silla	E. W. Elst	·	1.6 km	MPC · JPL
55806	1994 PB_{26}	—	August 12, 1994	La Silla	E. W. Elst	·	7.5 km	MPC · JPL
55807	1994 PM_{38}	—	August 10, 1994	La Silla	E. W. Elst	·	1.3 km	MPC · JPL
55808	1994 RN	—	September 7, 1994	Stroncone	Santa Lucia	VER	5.8 km	MPC · JPL
55809	1994 RW_{15}	—	September 3, 1994	La Silla	E. W. Elst	·	1.3 km	MPC · JPL
55810 Fabiofazio	1994 TC	Fabiofazio	October 4, 1994	Sormano	P. Sicoli, Ghezzi, P.	PHO	2.7 km	MPC · JPL
55811	1994 TE_{12}	—	October 10, 1994	Kitt Peak	Spacewatch	·	2.3 km	MPC · JPL
55812	1994 UC_{9}	—	October 28, 1994	Kitt Peak	Spacewatch	·	1.9 km	MPC · JPL
55813	1994 VQ_{2}	—	November 8, 1994	Oizumi	T. Kobayashi	NYS ·	4.6 km	MPC · JPL
55814	1994 YD	—	December 24, 1994	Oizumi	T. Kobayashi	·	4.8 km	MPC · JPL
55815 Melindakim	1994 YU_{2}	Melindakim	December 31, 1994	Siding Spring	D. I. Steel	PHO	4.9 km	MPC · JPL
55816	1995 CO	—	February 4, 1995	Stony Ridge	Child, J. B., Rogers, J. E.	·	4.2 km	MPC · JPL
55817	1995 DA_{6}	—	February 24, 1995	Kitt Peak	Spacewatch	·	3.4 km	MPC · JPL
55818	1995 DG_{11}	—	February 25, 1995	Kitt Peak	Spacewatch	(5)	3.1 km	MPC · JPL
55819	1995 EF_{7}	—	March 2, 1995	Kitt Peak	Spacewatch	·	3.4 km	MPC · JPL
55820	1995 FW	—	March 25, 1995	Siding Spring	G. J. Garradd	H	920 m	MPC · JPL
55821	1995 JA_{1}	—	May 4, 1995	Kitt Peak	Spacewatch	·	4.7 km	MPC · JPL
55822	1995 LV	—	June 4, 1995	Kitt Peak	Spacewatch	·	4.3 km	MPC · JPL
55823	1995 OF_{12}	—	July 22, 1995	Kitt Peak	Spacewatch	TIR	6.7 km	MPC · JPL
55824	1995 QN_{1}	—	August 19, 1995	Xinglong	SCAP	·	4.4 km	MPC · JPL
55825	1995 SD_{4}	—	September 27, 1995	Church Stretton	S. P. Laurie	·	2.1 km	MPC · JPL
55826	1995 SY_{7}	—	September 17, 1995	Kitt Peak	Spacewatch	·	4.2 km	MPC · JPL
55827	1995 SL_{43}	—	September 25, 1995	Kitt Peak	Spacewatch	THM	4.0 km	MPC · JPL
55828	1995 UN_{6}	—	October 16, 1995	San Marcello	A. Boattini, L. Tesi	·	6.7 km	MPC · JPL
55829	1995 UG_{12}	—	October 17, 1995	Kitt Peak	Spacewatch	·	3.1 km	MPC · JPL
55830	1995 WA_{19}	—	November 17, 1995	Kitt Peak	Spacewatch	·	6.2 km	MPC · JPL
55831	1995 XL	—	December 12, 1995	Sudbury	D. di Cicco	·	1.5 km	MPC · JPL
55832	1996 GD_{17}	—	April 13, 1996	Xinglong	SCAP	PHO	2.1 km	MPC · JPL
55833	1996 GM_{18}	—	April 15, 1996	La Silla	E. W. Elst	·	3.6 km	MPC · JPL
55834	1996 GW_{18}	—	April 15, 1996	La Silla	E. W. Elst	·	2.3 km	MPC · JPL
55835	1996 HH_{6}	—	April 17, 1996	Kitt Peak	Spacewatch	·	3.2 km	MPC · JPL
55836	1996 HW_{22}	—	April 20, 1996	La Silla	E. W. Elst	NYS	2.3 km	MPC · JPL
55837	1996 JV_{2}	—	May 15, 1996	Xinglong	SCAP	·	3.3 km	MPC · JPL
55838 Hagongda	1996 LN	Hagongda	June 7, 1996	Xinglong	SCAP	·	3.3 km	MPC · JPL
55839	1996 LH_{1}	—	June 13, 1996	Church Stretton	S. P. Laurie	·	4.1 km	MPC · JPL
55840	1996 NB_{2}	—	July 15, 1996	Haleakala	NEAT	ADE	7.7 km	MPC · JPL
55841	1996 NW_{4}	—	July 14, 1996	La Silla	E. W. Elst	(17392)	4.3 km	MPC · JPL
55842	1996 PU	—	August 9, 1996	Haleakala	NEAT	·	3.5 km	MPC · JPL
55843	1996 PD_{1}	—	August 9, 1996	Loomberah	G. J. Garradd	·	3.4 km	MPC · JPL
55844 Bičák	1996 RN_{2}	Bičák	September 12, 1996	Catalina Station	C. W. Hergenrother	H	2.6 km	MPC · JPL
55845 Marco	1996 RO_{2}	Marco	September 13, 1996	Bologna	San Vittore	MAR	2.1 km	MPC · JPL
55846	1996 RJ_{5}	—	September 15, 1996	Church Stretton	S. P. Laurie	·	6.1 km	MPC · JPL
55847	1996 SQ	—	September 20, 1996	Sudbury	D. di Cicco	·	4.5 km	MPC · JPL
55848	1996 SF_{6}	—	September 18, 1996	Xinglong	SCAP	·	4.1 km	MPC · JPL
55849	1996 TZ_{11}	—	October 3, 1996	Xinglong	SCAP	·	7.1 km	MPC · JPL
55850	1996 TV_{21}	—	October 6, 1996	Kitt Peak	Spacewatch	·	3.5 km	MPC · JPL
55851	1996 TA_{31}	—	October 8, 1996	Kitt Peak	Spacewatch	·	4.4 km	MPC · JPL
55852	1996 TS_{34}	—	October 10, 1996	Kitt Peak	Spacewatch	KOR	2.4 km	MPC · JPL
55853	1996 TF_{52}	—	October 5, 1996	La Silla	E. W. Elst	EUN	5.2 km	MPC · JPL
55854 Stoppani	1996 VS_{1}	Stoppani	November 8, 1996	Sormano	M. Cavagna, P. Chiavenna	H	2.9 km	MPC · JPL
55855	1996 VB_{7}	—	November 2, 1996	Xinglong	SCAP	·	4.4 km	MPC · JPL
55856	1996 VQ_{15}	—	November 5, 1996	Kitt Peak	Spacewatch	KOR	2.8 km	MPC · JPL
55857	1996 XU_{2}	—	December 2, 1996	Oizumi	T. Kobayashi	·	5.8 km	MPC · JPL
55858	1996 XT_{20}	—	December 5, 1996	Kitt Peak	Spacewatch	·	4.4 km	MPC · JPL
55859	1997 AO_{8}	—	January 2, 1997	Kitt Peak	Spacewatch	·	3.4 km	MPC · JPL
55860	1997 BQ_{6}	—	January 31, 1997	Ondřejov	L. Kotková	THM	5.6 km	MPC · JPL
55861	1997 CZ_{12}	—	February 4, 1997	Kitt Peak	Spacewatch	VER	6.0 km	MPC · JPL
55862	1997 CV_{28}	—	February 6, 1997	Xinglong	SCAP	·	1.7 km	MPC · JPL
55863 Jeffwayne	1997 OM_{2}	Jeffwayne	July 31, 1997	Caussols	ODAS	NYS	3.9 km	MPC · JPL
55864	1997 PC	—	August 1, 1997	Haleakala	NEAT	NYS	3.6 km	MPC · JPL
55865	1997 PZ	—	August 3, 1997	Xinglong	SCAP	·	2.1 km	MPC · JPL
55866 Javiersierra	1997 PV_{4}	Javiersierra	August 11, 1997	Mallorca	Á. López J., R. Pacheco	·	1.9 km	MPC · JPL
55867	1997 RX_{2}	—	September 3, 1997	Woomera	F. B. Zoltowski	V	1.6 km	MPC · JPL
55868	1997 SH_{31}	—	September 28, 1997	Kitt Peak	Spacewatch	·	1.7 km	MPC · JPL
55869	1997 TB_{2}	—	October 3, 1997	Caussols	ODAS	·	2.9 km	MPC · JPL
55870	1997 TD_{26}	—	October 11, 1997	Xinglong	SCAP	·	4.6 km	MPC · JPL
55871	1997 UE_{1}	—	October 21, 1997	Nachi-Katsuura	Y. Shimizu, T. Urata	(5)	3.7 km	MPC · JPL
55872	1997 UW_{5}	—	October 21, 1997	Kitt Peak	Spacewatch	·	6.1 km	MPC · JPL
55873 Shiomidake	1997 UP_{7}	Shiomidake	October 26, 1997	Mishima	M. Akiyama	·	4.5 km	MPC · JPL
55874 Brlka	1997 UL_{9}	Brlka	October 28, 1997	Ondřejov	P. Pravec	·	4.0 km	MPC · JPL
55875 Hirohatagaoka	1997 VH	Hirohatagaoka	November 1, 1997	Hadano Obs.	A. Asami	·	3.3 km	MPC · JPL
55876	1997 VH_{3}	—	November 6, 1997	Oizumi	T. Kobayashi	·	3.8 km	MPC · JPL
55877	1997 VZ_{6}	—	November 4, 1997	Nachi-Katsuura	Y. Shimizu, T. Urata	·	3.2 km	MPC · JPL
55878	1997 VX_{7}	—	November 3, 1997	Xinglong	SCAP	slow	2.9 km	MPC · JPL
55879	1997 WG	—	November 18, 1997	Oizumi	T. Kobayashi	(5)	3.5 km	MPC · JPL
55880	1997 WS	—	November 18, 1997	Prescott	P. G. Comba	·	3.3 km	MPC · JPL
55881	1997 WU_{1}	—	November 19, 1997	Oizumi	T. Kobayashi	·	4.8 km	MPC · JPL
55882	1997 WY_{1}	—	November 20, 1997	Woomera	F. B. Zoltowski	·	3.9 km	MPC · JPL
55883	1997 WF_{8}	—	November 23, 1997	Chichibu	N. Satō	·	3.8 km	MPC · JPL
55884	1997 WG_{9}	—	November 21, 1997	Kitt Peak	Spacewatch	·	2.6 km	MPC · JPL
55885	1997 WV_{18}	—	November 23, 1997	Kitt Peak	Spacewatch	·	2.4 km	MPC · JPL
55886	1997 WT_{35}	—	November 29, 1997	Socorro	LINEAR	EUN	4.2 km	MPC · JPL
55887	1997 WE_{37}	—	November 29, 1997	Socorro	LINEAR	·	5.1 km	MPC · JPL
55888	1997 WG_{44}	—	November 29, 1997	Socorro	LINEAR	(5)	5.2 km	MPC · JPL
55889	1997 WD_{52}	—	November 29, 1997	Socorro	LINEAR	·	5.7 km	MPC · JPL
55890	1997 WO_{54}	—	November 29, 1997	Socorro	LINEAR	·	5.9 km	MPC · JPL
55891 Jameslequeux	1997 XF_{3}	Jameslequeux	December 3, 1997	Caussols	ODAS	·	3.3 km	MPC · JPL
55892 Fuzhougezhi	1997 XQ_{5}	Fuzhougezhi	December 1, 1997	Xinglong	SCAP	·	4.1 km	MPC · JPL
55893	1997 YL	—	December 20, 1997	Oizumi	T. Kobayashi	·	4.1 km	MPC · JPL
55894	1997 YS_{3}	—	December 22, 1997	Xinglong	SCAP	(5)	3.7 km	MPC · JPL
55895	1998 AP	—	January 5, 1998	Oizumi	T. Kobayashi	DOR	7.8 km	MPC · JPL
55896	1998 AM_{5}	—	January 8, 1998	Caussols	ODAS	·	6.1 km	MPC · JPL
55897 Antoinecailleau	1998 AH_{6}	Antoinecailleau	January 8, 1998	Caussols	ODAS	KOR	6.5 km	MPC · JPL
55898	1998 AG_{10}	—	January 15, 1998	Caussols	ODAS	·	5.1 km	MPC · JPL
55899	1998 BJ_{10}	—	January 24, 1998	Woomera	F. B. Zoltowski	·	3.8 km	MPC · JPL
55900	1998 CQ	—	February 3, 1998	Modra	A. Galád, Pravda, A.	·	5.6 km	MPC · JPL

== 55901–56000 ==
back to top

Designation			Discovery			Properties		Ref
Permanent	Provisional	Named after	Date	Site	Discoverer(s)	Category	Diam.	Ref
55901 Xuaoao	1998 CL_{2}	Xuaoao	February 15, 1998	Xinglong	SCAP	(5)	3.6 km	MPC · JPL
55902	1998 CO_{2}	—	February 15, 1998	Xinglong	SCAP	EUN	3.5 km	MPC · JPL
55903	1998 DN	—	February 17, 1998	Campo Catino	Catino, Campo	·	5.7 km	MPC · JPL
55904	1998 DR_{1}	—	February 20, 1998	Kleť	Kleť	KOR	2.8 km	MPC · JPL
55905	1998 DD_{3}	—	February 21, 1998	Kleť	Kleť	·	6.6 km	MPC · JPL
55906	1998 DS_{20}	—	February 28, 1998	Prescott	P. G. Comba	·	3.7 km	MPC · JPL
55907	1998 DW_{27}	—	February 23, 1998	Kitt Peak	Spacewatch	·	12 km	MPC · JPL
55908	1998 EV_{4}	—	March 1, 1998	Kitt Peak	Spacewatch	KOR	2.6 km	MPC · JPL
55909	1998 EB_{11}	—	March 1, 1998	La Silla	E. W. Elst	·	4.1 km	MPC · JPL
55910	1998 EN_{12}	—	March 1, 1998	La Silla	E. W. Elst	·	6.4 km	MPC · JPL
55911	1998 EP_{12}	—	March 1, 1998	La Silla	E. W. Elst	HOF	9.0 km	MPC · JPL
55912	1998 FD_{9}	—	March 22, 1998	Kitt Peak	Spacewatch	(8737)	9.2 km	MPC · JPL
55913 Alinedupin	1998 FL_{12}	Alinedupin	March 26, 1998	Caussols	ODAS	H	1.9 km	MPC · JPL
55914	1998 FV_{14}	—	March 26, 1998	Caussols	ODAS	·	6.6 km	MPC · JPL
55915	1998 FB_{17}	—	March 20, 1998	Socorro	LINEAR	·	3.5 km	MPC · JPL
55916	1998 FM_{25}	—	March 20, 1998	Socorro	LINEAR	·	14 km	MPC · JPL
55917	1998 FN_{30}	—	March 20, 1998	Socorro	LINEAR	EOS	5.0 km	MPC · JPL
55918	1998 FP_{30}	—	March 20, 1998	Socorro	LINEAR	·	8.0 km	MPC · JPL
55919	1998 FA_{39}	—	March 20, 1998	Socorro	LINEAR	EOS	6.5 km	MPC · JPL
55920	1998 FM_{43}	—	March 20, 1998	Socorro	LINEAR	·	4.1 km	MPC · JPL
55921	1998 FK_{50}	—	March 20, 1998	Socorro	LINEAR	EOS	4.2 km	MPC · JPL
55922	1998 FL_{51}	—	March 20, 1998	Socorro	LINEAR	THM	8.2 km	MPC · JPL
55923	1998 FD_{55}	—	March 20, 1998	Socorro	LINEAR	TEL	4.2 km	MPC · JPL
55924	1998 FE_{55}	—	March 20, 1998	Socorro	LINEAR	·	5.0 km	MPC · JPL
55925	1998 FY_{57}	—	March 20, 1998	Socorro	LINEAR	TEL	4.4 km	MPC · JPL
55926	1998 FE_{60}	—	March 20, 1998	Socorro	LINEAR	slow	10 km	MPC · JPL
55927	1998 FN_{60}	—	March 20, 1998	Socorro	LINEAR	EOS	5.0 km	MPC · JPL
55928	1998 FG_{64}	—	March 20, 1998	Socorro	LINEAR	EMA ·	7.6 km	MPC · JPL
55929	1998 FW_{64}	—	March 20, 1998	Socorro	LINEAR	URS	11 km	MPC · JPL
55930	1998 FY_{64}	—	March 20, 1998	Socorro	LINEAR	BRA	5.3 km	MPC · JPL
55931	1998 FM_{67}	—	March 20, 1998	Socorro	LINEAR	·	7.3 km	MPC · JPL
55932	1998 FE_{68}	—	March 20, 1998	Socorro	LINEAR	·	5.7 km	MPC · JPL
55933	1998 FD_{73}	—	March 30, 1998	Ondřejov	P. Pravec, M. Wolf	·	5.7 km	MPC · JPL
55934	1998 FF_{73}	—	March 28, 1998	Socorro	LINEAR	H	1.4 km	MPC · JPL
55935	1998 FO_{74}	—	March 24, 1998	Bergisch Gladbach	W. Bickel	GEF	3.5 km	MPC · JPL
55936	1998 FO_{76}	—	March 24, 1998	Socorro	LINEAR	·	6.9 km	MPC · JPL
55937	1998 FN_{105}	—	March 31, 1998	Socorro	LINEAR	EOS	6.3 km	MPC · JPL
55938	1998 FO_{113}	—	March 31, 1998	Socorro	LINEAR	·	5.6 km	MPC · JPL
55939	1998 FD_{118}	—	March 31, 1998	Socorro	LINEAR	·	5.3 km	MPC · JPL
55940	1998 GU_{8}	—	April 2, 1998	Socorro	LINEAR	·	13 km	MPC · JPL
55941	1998 HS_{4}	—	April 23, 1998	Kleť	Kleť	·	3.6 km	MPC · JPL
55942	1998 HJ_{12}	—	April 19, 1998	Kitt Peak	Spacewatch	·	5.0 km	MPC · JPL
55943	1998 HJ_{15}	—	April 20, 1998	Kitt Peak	Spacewatch	·	11 km	MPC · JPL
55944	1998 HP_{18}	—	April 18, 1998	Socorro	LINEAR	EOS	4.4 km	MPC · JPL
55945	1998 HF_{23}	—	April 20, 1998	Socorro	LINEAR	·	13 km	MPC · JPL
55946	1998 HP_{24}	—	April 22, 1998	Višnjan Observatory	Višnjan	·	16 km	MPC · JPL
55947	1998 HQ_{42}	—	April 23, 1998	Haleakala	NEAT	·	10 km	MPC · JPL
55948	1998 HY_{45}	—	April 20, 1998	Socorro	LINEAR	·	6.9 km	MPC · JPL
55949	1998 HZ_{45}	—	April 20, 1998	Socorro	LINEAR	·	7.0 km	MPC · JPL
55950	1998 HG_{58}	—	April 21, 1998	Socorro	LINEAR	THM	5.1 km	MPC · JPL
55951	1998 HP_{58}	—	April 21, 1998	Socorro	LINEAR	THM	6.6 km	MPC · JPL
55952	1998 HR_{61}	—	April 21, 1998	Socorro	LINEAR	·	5.9 km	MPC · JPL
55953	1998 HG_{65}	—	April 21, 1998	Socorro	LINEAR	·	5.3 km	MPC · JPL
55954	1998 HX_{68}	—	April 21, 1998	Socorro	LINEAR	·	5.5 km	MPC · JPL
55955	1998 HJ_{81}	—	April 21, 1998	Socorro	LINEAR	·	7.6 km	MPC · JPL
55956	1998 HO_{100}	—	April 21, 1998	Socorro	LINEAR	·	16 km	MPC · JPL
55957	1998 HZ_{100}	—	April 21, 1998	Socorro	LINEAR	·	7.6 km	MPC · JPL
55958	1998 HK_{109}	—	April 23, 1998	Socorro	LINEAR	EUP	8.4 km	MPC · JPL
55959	1998 HC_{126}	—	April 23, 1998	Socorro	LINEAR	·	8.3 km	MPC · JPL
55960	1998 HX_{133}	—	April 19, 1998	Socorro	LINEAR	·	10 km	MPC · JPL
55961	1998 HB_{143}	—	April 21, 1998	Socorro	LINEAR	URS	12 km	MPC · JPL
55962	1998 HA_{152}	—	April 19, 1998	Socorro	LINEAR	TIR	5.2 km	MPC · JPL
55963	1998 HV_{152}	—	April 22, 1998	Socorro	LINEAR	HYG	6.5 km	MPC · JPL
55964	1998 KB_{2}	—	May 22, 1998	Socorro	LINEAR	H	1.7 km	MPC · JPL
55965	1998 KN_{14}	—	May 22, 1998	Socorro	LINEAR	·	5.7 km	MPC · JPL
55966	1998 KV_{14}	—	May 22, 1998	Socorro	LINEAR	·	5.4 km	MPC · JPL
55967	1998 KT_{47}	—	May 22, 1998	Socorro	LINEAR	URS	9.2 km	MPC · JPL
55968	1998 KV_{54}	—	May 23, 1998	Socorro	LINEAR	·	11 km	MPC · JPL
55969	1998 KH_{56}	—	May 27, 1998	Socorro	LINEAR	H	1.4 km	MPC · JPL
55970	1998 NO_{1}	—	July 2, 1998	Anderson Mesa	LONEOS	·	2.3 km	MPC · JPL
55971	1998 OA_{9}	—	July 26, 1998	La Silla	E. W. Elst	·	1.6 km	MPC · JPL
55972	1998 QS_{20}	—	August 17, 1998	Socorro	LINEAR	·	1.7 km	MPC · JPL
55973	1998 QA_{49}	—	August 17, 1998	Socorro	LINEAR	·	2.1 km	MPC · JPL
55974	1998 QK_{72}	—	August 24, 1998	Socorro	LINEAR	·	8.0 km	MPC · JPL
55975	1998 QB_{94}	—	August 17, 1998	Socorro	LINEAR	·	2.0 km	MPC · JPL
55976	1998 RE_{5}	—	September 15, 1998	Reedy Creek	J. Broughton	·	2.0 km	MPC · JPL
55977	1998 RJ_{19}	—	September 14, 1998	Socorro	LINEAR	MAS	1.5 km	MPC · JPL
55978	1998 RN_{52}	—	September 14, 1998	Socorro	LINEAR	·	1.8 km	MPC · JPL
55979	1998 RP_{54}	—	September 14, 1998	Socorro	LINEAR	·	2.6 km	MPC · JPL
55980	1998 RG_{61}	—	September 14, 1998	Socorro	LINEAR	·	2.8 km	MPC · JPL
55981	1998 RO_{61}	—	September 14, 1998	Socorro	LINEAR	·	1.4 km	MPC · JPL
55982	1998 RS_{61}	—	September 14, 1998	Socorro	LINEAR	·	2.0 km	MPC · JPL
55983	1998 RC_{72}	—	September 14, 1998	Socorro	LINEAR	·	1.8 km	MPC · JPL
55984	1998 RZ_{77}	—	September 14, 1998	Socorro	LINEAR	·	1.9 km	MPC · JPL
55985	1998 RU_{79}	—	September 14, 1998	Socorro	LINEAR	·	1.6 km	MPC · JPL
55986	1998 ST_{24}	—	September 17, 1998	Anderson Mesa	LONEOS	·	2.1 km	MPC · JPL
55987 Maríaruiz	1998 SO_{27}	Maríaruiz	September 24, 1998	Catalina	CSS	PHO	3.1 km	MPC · JPL
55988	1998 SD_{47}	—	September 25, 1998	Kitt Peak	Spacewatch	·	1.6 km	MPC · JPL
55989	1998 SA_{62}	—	September 18, 1998	Anderson Mesa	LONEOS	V	2.3 km	MPC · JPL
55990	1998 SQ_{71}	—	September 21, 1998	La Silla	E. W. Elst	·	1.5 km	MPC · JPL
55991	1998 SL_{78}	—	September 26, 1998	Socorro	LINEAR	·	7.5 km	MPC · JPL
55992	1998 SX_{82}	—	September 26, 1998	Socorro	LINEAR	·	4.6 km	MPC · JPL
55993	1998 SZ_{102}	—	September 26, 1998	Socorro	LINEAR	·	2.4 km	MPC · JPL
55994	1998 SR_{105}	—	September 26, 1998	Socorro	LINEAR	·	6.8 km	MPC · JPL
55995	1998 SK_{107}	—	September 26, 1998	Socorro	LINEAR	·	1.6 km	MPC · JPL
55996	1998 SC_{110}	—	September 26, 1998	Socorro	LINEAR	·	1.9 km	MPC · JPL
55997	1998 SB_{128}	—	September 26, 1998	Socorro	LINEAR	·	3.3 km	MPC · JPL
55998	1998 SQ_{135}	—	September 26, 1998	Socorro	LINEAR	·	1.9 km	MPC · JPL
55999	1998 SK_{144}	—	September 18, 1998	La Silla	E. W. Elst	·	4.1 km	MPC · JPL
56000 Mesopotamia	1998 SN_{144}	Mesopotamia	September 20, 1998	La Silla	E. W. Elst	·	2.3 km	MPC · JPL

back to top

== See also ==
- Meanings of minor-planet names: 55001–56000
