= Meanings of minor-planet names: 54001–55000 =

As minor planet discoveries are confirmed, they are given a permanent number by the IAU's Minor Planet Center (MPC), and the discoverers can then submit names for them, following the IAU's naming conventions. The list below concerns those minor planets in the specified number-range that have received names, and explains the meanings of those names.

Official naming citations of newly named small Solar System bodies are approved and published in a bulletin by IAU's Working Group for Small Bodies Nomenclature (WGSBN). Before May 2021, citations were published in MPC's Minor Planet Circulars for many decades. Recent citations can also be found on the JPL Small-Body Database (SBDB). Until his death in 2016, German astronomer Lutz D. Schmadel compiled these citations into the Dictionary of Minor Planet Names (DMP) and regularly updated the collection.

Based on Paul Herget's The Names of the Minor Planets, Schmadel also researched the unclear origin of numerous asteroids, most of which had been named prior to World War II. This article incorporates text from this source, which is in the public domain: SBDB New namings may only be added to this list below after official publication as the preannouncement of names is condemned. The WGSBN publishes a comprehensive guideline for the naming rules of non-cometary small Solar System bodies.

== 54001–54100 ==
Named minor planet	Provisional	This minor planet was named for...	Ref · Catalog
There are no named minor planets in this number range

== 54101–54200 ==
back to top

Named minor planet	Provisional	This minor planet was named for...	Ref · Catalog
54182 Galsarid	2000 HA_{66}	Gal Sarid (born 1981) is a research scientist at the Florida Space Institute who studies the thermal evolution of comets and asteroids, and the early compositional evolution of the solar system.	IAU · 54182

== 54201–54300 ==
back to top

Named minor planet	Provisional	This minor planet was named for...	Ref · Catalog
54237 Hiroshimanabe	2000 JD_{18}	Hiroshi Manabe, Japanese illustrator	JPL · 54237
54288 Daikikawasaki	2000 JV_{53}	Daiki Kawasaki (born 1996), the discoverer's oldest grandchild.	JPL · 54288

== 54301–54400 ==
back to top

Named minor planet	Provisional	This minor planet was named for...	Ref · Catalog
54362 Restitutum	2000 KP_{38}	Latin term for "something that has been replaced or restored to its former place"; this minor planet was originally lost soon after discovery, then found again †	MPC · 54362
54391 Adammckay	2000 KO_{67}	Adam McKay (born 1986) is a postdoctoral fellow at the American University and NASA-GSFC (USA) who studies the volatile composition of comets through high-resolution spectroscopy at optical and IR wavelengths.	IAU · 54391

== 54401–54500 ==
back to top

Named minor planet	Provisional	This minor planet was named for...	Ref · Catalog
54402 Jonathanbradshaw	2000 LA_{2}	Jonathan Bradshaw (b. 1965) is an English-Australian occultation observer who in 2021 noticed the single blink of a star 7.4 radii from dwarf planet Quaoar where no event was expected. Independent observations by R. Langersek and J. Broughton led to it being reported to Paris Observatory as a Neptune-like ring, with nothing detected on the outbound side.	JPL · 54402
54403 Langersek	2000 LD_{2}	Renato Langersek (b. 1964) is a Slovenian-Australian occultation observer who co-discovered dwarf-planet Quaoar's unique Q1R ring, having recorded a star's brief disappearance in 2021. The discovery surprised the science community when it was announced in 2023. The ring is an enigma in that its radial distance far exceeds the long-established Roche Limit.	JPL · 54403
54411 Bobestelle	2000 LH_{10}	George Robert ("Bob") Stetson and Estelle Marie Ives, the discoverer's parents	JPL · 54411
54439 Topeka	2000 MG_{3}	Topeka, Kansas	JPL · 54439

== 54501–54600 ==
back to top

Named minor planet	Provisional	This minor planet was named for...	Ref · Catalog
54509 YORP	2000 PH_{5}	YORP effect	JPL · 54509
54510 Yakagehonjin	2000 PD_{7}	Yakage honjin, located in southwestern Okayama, was a traditional accommodation for the daimyo and other Shogunate officials while on the road in the Edo Period. Only upper-class persons could stay or have meals there. It is designated as an important cultural property of Japan.	IAU · 54510
54521 Aladdin	2000 QD_{1}	Aladdin is the central character in a well-known folk tale of the same name. The story originates from western China or possibly the Middle East. It tells of Aladdin's battle with evil sorcerers to gain control of a magic lamp containing a genie who emerges to grant wishes whenever the lamp is rubbed.	JPL · 54521
54522 Menaechmus	2000 QS_{1}	Menaechmus, 4th-century B.C. Greek mathematician, credited with the discovery of the conic sections	JPL · 54522
54563 Kinokonasu	2000 QJ_{147}	Kinoko Nasu (born 1973) is a Japanese author. His best-known works are Tsukihime, Fate/stay night, and Kara no Kyoukai (English title "Garden of Sinners"). All have been produced as anime series.	JPL · 54563
54564 Kiyoshiizumi	2000 QZ_{148}	Kiyoshi Izumi (born 1959), Japanese amateur astronomer and meteor observer since 1971.	JPL · 54564
54598 Bienor	2000 QC_{243}	Bienor, mythological centaur that attended Pirithous' wedding, fought in the ensuing battle against the Lapiths, and was killed by Theseus	JPL · 54598

== 54601–54700 ==
back to top

Named minor planet	Provisional	This minor planet was named for...	Ref · Catalog
54610 Toichisakata	2000 RG_{52}	Toichi Sakata (b. 1948) contributed to the promotion of science and technology in Japan. In addition, during his tenure as the President of the Japan Space Forum, he made a great contribution to the development of asteroid observation and debris observation, and worked hard to operate the Bisei Spaceguard Center.	IAU · 54610
54693 Garymyers	2001 FM_{6}	Gary Myers, American amateur astronomer, member of the Huachuca Astronomy Club	JPL · 54693

== 54701–54800 ==
back to top

Named minor planet	Provisional	This minor planet was named for...	Ref · Catalog
54720 Kentstevens	2001 JY_{2}	Kent Stevens (born 1952) has considerable expertise in Artificial Intelligence and Modeling and Simulation. He was a former Observatory Director at Hidden Valley Observatory in South Dakota and re-designed, engineered and replaced the original telescope following a severe vandalism incident.	JPL · 54720

== 54801–54900 ==
back to top

Named minor planet	Provisional	This minor planet was named for...	Ref · Catalog
54810 Molleigh	2001 MS_{24}	Molleigh Elena Struble (1994–2010) grew up near Yerkes Observatory, where she volunteered for educational programs such as one connecting Yerkes and the Science Museum, Tokyo.	JPL · 54810
54820 Svenders	2001 NV_{1}	Enders Robinson (1929–2022) and Sven Treitel (1930–2024), American pioneers of applied geophysical signal analysis †	MPC · 54820
54827 Kurpfalz	2001 NQ_{8}	The County Palatine of the Rhine ("Kurpfalz") goes back to a territory of the Holy Roman Empire. In the Congress of Vienna in 1815 it was separated from Rheinland. The region around Heidelberg–Mannheim (now a part of Baden–Württemberg) is today still called "Kurpfalz" referring also to the people talking "Kurpfälzisch".	JPL · 54827
54852 Mercatali	2001 OZ_{16}	Antonio Mercatali (born 1962), an amateur astronomer and astrometrist of minor planets from Livorno, Italy	JPL · 54852
54862 Sundaigakuen	2001 OW_{25}	Sundaigakuen, a high school in Tokyo, the alma mater of Japanese discoverer Hiroshi Maeno	JPL · 54862
54863 Gasnault	2001 OG_{28}	Olivier Gasnault (born 1973) specializes in remote sensing and is deeply involved in the exploration of the Moon and Mars, both from orbit and on the ground with the Curiosity Rover. Name and citation provided by S. Le Mouelic.	JPL · 54863

== 54901–55000 ==
back to top

Named minor planet	Provisional	This minor planet was named for...	Ref · Catalog
54902 Close	2001 OG_{77}	Gary Close (1940–1999), American director of Hopkins Planetarium †	MPC · 54902
54932 Waltharris	2001 OH_{103}	Walt Harris (born 1964) is a professor at the University of Arizona who studies thin atmospheres with an emphasis on comets. He also develops instrumentation for high-resolving power spectroscopy that has been used in ground and suborbital observations of comets and the interplanetary medium.	IAU · 54932
54963 Sotin	2001 PS_{12}	Christophe Sotin (born 1958), chief scientist of the proposed Titan orbiter Oceanus at JPL and director of the Laboratory for Planetology and Geodynamics at the University of Nantes	JPL · 54963
54967 Millucci	2001 PF_{29}	Vincenzo Millucci (born 1947), an Italian science communicator and professor of mathematical physics at the University of Siena. He established the university's Torre Luciana Observatory in Florence.	JPL · 54967
54983 Simone	2001 QE	Simone Tombelli (b. 1966), a member of Gruppo Astrofili Montelupo.	IAU · 54983

back to top

Preceded by 53,001–54,000	Meanings of minor-planet names List of minor planets: 54,001–55,000	Succeeded by 55,001–56,000
