= List of minor planets: 54001–55000 =

The following is a partial list of minor planets, running from minor-planet number 54001 through 55000, inclusive. The primary data for this and other partial lists is based on JPL's "Small-Body Orbital Elements" and data available from the Minor Planet Center. Critical list information is also provided by the MPC, unless otherwise specified from Lowell Observatory. A detailed description of the table's columns and additional sources are given on the main page including a complete list of every page in this series, and a statistical break-up on the dynamical classification of minor planets.

Also see the summary list of all named bodies in numerical and alphabetical order, and the corresponding naming citations for the number range of this particular list. New namings may only be added to this list after official publication, as the preannouncement of names is condemned by the Working Group for Small Bodies Nomenclature of the International Astronomical Union.

Near-Earth obj.	MBA (inner)	MBA (outer)	Centaur
Mars-crosser	MBA (middle)	Jupiter trojan	Trans-Neptunian obj.
Unclassified

== 54001–54100 ==
Designation			Discovery			Properties		Ref
Permanent	Provisional	Named after	Date	Site	Discoverer(s)	Category	Diam.	Ref
54001	2000 GP_{90}	—	April 4, 2000	Socorro	LINEAR	V	1.4 km	MPC · JPL
54002	2000 GS_{90}	—	April 4, 2000	Socorro	LINEAR	·	2.8 km	MPC · JPL
54003	2000 GN_{91}	—	April 4, 2000	Socorro	LINEAR	·	8.0 km	MPC · JPL
54004	2000 GP_{91}	—	April 4, 2000	Socorro	LINEAR	·	4.1 km	MPC · JPL
54005	2000 GJ_{93}	—	April 5, 2000	Socorro	LINEAR	·	5.3 km	MPC · JPL
54006	2000 GM_{93}	—	April 5, 2000	Socorro	LINEAR	·	3.6 km	MPC · JPL
54007	2000 GE_{94}	—	April 5, 2000	Socorro	LINEAR	·	6.9 km	MPC · JPL
54008	2000 GU_{94}	—	April 5, 2000	Socorro	LINEAR	EUN	3.3 km	MPC · JPL
54009	2000 GN_{95}	—	April 6, 2000	Socorro	LINEAR	·	2.0 km	MPC · JPL
54010	2000 GU_{95}	—	April 6, 2000	Socorro	LINEAR	·	5.4 km	MPC · JPL
54011	2000 GB_{96}	—	April 6, 2000	Socorro	LINEAR	V	1.7 km	MPC · JPL
54012	2000 GQ_{96}	—	April 6, 2000	Socorro	LINEAR	EUN	5.0 km	MPC · JPL
54013	2000 GA_{97}	—	April 6, 2000	Socorro	LINEAR	·	1.4 km	MPC · JPL
54014	2000 GY_{97}	—	April 7, 2000	Socorro	LINEAR	·	2.0 km	MPC · JPL
54015	2000 GC_{98}	—	April 7, 2000	Socorro	LINEAR	·	1.7 km	MPC · JPL
54016	2000 GF_{98}	—	April 7, 2000	Socorro	LINEAR	·	2.6 km	MPC · JPL
54017	2000 GP_{98}	—	April 7, 2000	Socorro	LINEAR	·	1.8 km	MPC · JPL
54018	2000 GO_{99}	—	April 7, 2000	Socorro	LINEAR	(2076)	1.6 km	MPC · JPL
54019	2000 GP_{99}	—	April 7, 2000	Socorro	LINEAR	·	1.9 km	MPC · JPL
54020	2000 GT_{99}	—	April 7, 2000	Socorro	LINEAR	·	1.5 km	MPC · JPL
54021	2000 GU_{99}	—	April 7, 2000	Socorro	LINEAR	·	6.3 km	MPC · JPL
54022	2000 GX_{99}	—	April 7, 2000	Socorro	LINEAR	NYS	4.3 km	MPC · JPL
54023	2000 GD_{100}	—	April 7, 2000	Socorro	LINEAR	·	2.3 km	MPC · JPL
54024	2000 GS_{100}	—	April 7, 2000	Socorro	LINEAR	·	4.2 km	MPC · JPL
54025	2000 GU_{103}	—	April 7, 2000	Socorro	LINEAR	slow	3.4 km	MPC · JPL
54026	2000 GH_{104}	—	April 7, 2000	Socorro	LINEAR	·	6.3 km	MPC · JPL
54027	2000 GT_{104}	—	April 7, 2000	Socorro	LINEAR	·	4.7 km	MPC · JPL
54028	2000 GW_{104}	—	April 7, 2000	Socorro	LINEAR	·	2.5 km	MPC · JPL
54029	2000 GB_{105}	—	April 7, 2000	Socorro	LINEAR	·	2.0 km	MPC · JPL
54030	2000 GF_{105}	—	April 7, 2000	Socorro	LINEAR	·	2.1 km	MPC · JPL
54031	2000 GP_{105}	—	April 7, 2000	Socorro	LINEAR	·	1.7 km	MPC · JPL
54032	2000 GL_{106}	—	April 7, 2000	Socorro	LINEAR	·	3.2 km	MPC · JPL
54033	2000 GV_{106}	—	April 7, 2000	Socorro	LINEAR	NYS	2.5 km	MPC · JPL
54034	2000 GG_{107}	—	April 7, 2000	Socorro	LINEAR	·	1.6 km	MPC · JPL
54035	2000 GG_{109}	—	April 7, 2000	Socorro	LINEAR	·	3.4 km	MPC · JPL
54036	2000 GP_{109}	—	April 7, 2000	Socorro	LINEAR	V	2.4 km	MPC · JPL
54037	2000 GE_{110}	—	April 2, 2000	Anderson Mesa	LONEOS	·	5.6 km	MPC · JPL
54038	2000 GS_{110}	—	April 2, 2000	Anderson Mesa	LONEOS	·	7.3 km	MPC · JPL
54039	2000 GW_{110}	—	April 2, 2000	Anderson Mesa	LONEOS	·	3.6 km	MPC · JPL
54040	2000 GZ_{112}	—	April 5, 2000	Socorro	LINEAR	·	2.5 km	MPC · JPL
54041	2000 GQ_{113}	—	April 7, 2000	Socorro	LINEAR	V	2.7 km	MPC · JPL
54042	2000 GR_{113}	—	April 7, 2000	Socorro	LINEAR	·	4.1 km	MPC · JPL
54043	2000 GC_{114}	—	April 7, 2000	Socorro	LINEAR	·	1.6 km	MPC · JPL
54044	2000 GG_{114}	—	April 7, 2000	Socorro	LINEAR	EUN	3.9 km	MPC · JPL
54045	2000 GO_{115}	—	April 8, 2000	Socorro	LINEAR	NYS ·	4.0 km	MPC · JPL
54046	2000 GK_{123}	—	April 7, 2000	Socorro	LINEAR	·	8.1 km	MPC · JPL
54047	2000 GM_{123}	—	April 7, 2000	Socorro	LINEAR	·	8.3 km	MPC · JPL
54048	2000 GE_{125}	—	April 7, 2000	Socorro	LINEAR	·	5.6 km	MPC · JPL
54049	2000 GO_{125}	—	April 7, 2000	Socorro	LINEAR	·	6.6 km	MPC · JPL
54050	2000 GE_{126}	—	April 7, 2000	Socorro	LINEAR	·	5.2 km	MPC · JPL
54051	2000 GL_{126}	—	April 7, 2000	Socorro	LINEAR	·	6.6 km	MPC · JPL
54052	2000 GQ_{126}	—	April 7, 2000	Socorro	LINEAR	·	9.1 km	MPC · JPL
54053	2000 GV_{126}	—	April 7, 2000	Socorro	LINEAR	·	11 km	MPC · JPL
54054	2000 GK_{127}	—	April 8, 2000	Socorro	LINEAR	·	3.7 km	MPC · JPL
54055	2000 GL_{133}	—	April 7, 2000	Socorro	LINEAR	·	3.9 km	MPC · JPL
54056	2000 GT_{133}	—	April 7, 2000	Socorro	LINEAR	·	12 km	MPC · JPL
54057	2000 GF_{134}	—	April 7, 2000	Socorro	LINEAR	·	2.7 km	MPC · JPL
54058	2000 GG_{134}	—	April 7, 2000	Socorro	LINEAR	·	4.6 km	MPC · JPL
54059	2000 GN_{134}	—	April 8, 2000	Socorro	LINEAR	·	3.5 km	MPC · JPL
54060	2000 GR_{134}	—	April 8, 2000	Socorro	LINEAR	·	1.6 km	MPC · JPL
54061	2000 GX_{134}	—	April 8, 2000	Socorro	LINEAR	·	1.6 km	MPC · JPL
54062	2000 GX_{135}	—	April 10, 2000	Socorro	LINEAR	·	3.4 km	MPC · JPL
54063	2000 GC_{136}	—	April 12, 2000	Socorro	LINEAR	·	6.5 km	MPC · JPL
54064	2000 GF_{138}	—	April 4, 2000	Anderson Mesa	LONEOS	·	2.0 km	MPC · JPL
54065	2000 GZ_{138}	—	April 4, 2000	Anderson Mesa	LONEOS	·	4.3 km	MPC · JPL
54066	2000 GN_{139}	—	April 4, 2000	Anderson Mesa	LONEOS	·	1.6 km	MPC · JPL
54067	2000 GR_{140}	—	April 4, 2000	Anderson Mesa	LONEOS	·	2.0 km	MPC · JPL
54068	2000 GD_{142}	—	April 7, 2000	Anderson Mesa	LONEOS	EUN	3.9 km	MPC · JPL
54069	2000 GM_{142}	—	April 7, 2000	Anderson Mesa	LONEOS	·	4.7 km	MPC · JPL
54070	2000 GQ_{143}	—	April 7, 2000	Anderson Mesa	LONEOS	·	1.9 km	MPC · JPL
54071	2000 GQ_{146}	—	April 10, 2000	Socorro	LINEAR	AMO +1km	1.2 km	MPC · JPL
54072	2000 GV_{148}	—	April 5, 2000	Socorro	LINEAR	·	2.6 km	MPC · JPL
54073	2000 GG_{149}	—	April 5, 2000	Socorro	LINEAR	NYS ·	4.9 km	MPC · JPL
54074	2000 GV_{149}	—	April 5, 2000	Socorro	LINEAR	NYS	1.9 km	MPC · JPL
54075	2000 GY_{153}	—	April 6, 2000	Anderson Mesa	LONEOS	·	5.4 km	MPC · JPL
54076	2000 GL_{154}	—	April 6, 2000	Anderson Mesa	LONEOS	V	1.7 km	MPC · JPL
54077	2000 GA_{157}	—	April 6, 2000	Socorro	LINEAR	V	2.1 km	MPC · JPL
54078	2000 GC_{157}	—	April 6, 2000	Socorro	LINEAR	(5)	3.0 km	MPC · JPL
54079	2000 GY_{157}	—	April 7, 2000	Anderson Mesa	LONEOS	·	1.7 km	MPC · JPL
54080	2000 GA_{160}	—	April 7, 2000	Socorro	LINEAR	·	2.8 km	MPC · JPL
54081	2000 GH_{162}	—	April 7, 2000	Anderson Mesa	LONEOS	·	7.0 km	MPC · JPL
54082	2000 GO_{162}	—	April 8, 2000	Socorro	LINEAR	·	3.3 km	MPC · JPL
54083	2000 GQ_{162}	—	April 8, 2000	Socorro	LINEAR	·	4.1 km	MPC · JPL
54084	2000 GF_{163}	—	April 9, 2000	Anderson Mesa	LONEOS	V	2.6 km	MPC · JPL
54085	2000 GY_{163}	—	April 12, 2000	Socorro	LINEAR	MAR	5.3 km	MPC · JPL
54086	2000 GH_{165}	—	April 5, 2000	Socorro	LINEAR	V	1.3 km	MPC · JPL
54087	2000 GO_{172}	—	April 2, 2000	Anderson Mesa	LONEOS	V	2.4 km	MPC · JPL
54088	2000 GR_{173}	—	April 5, 2000	Anderson Mesa	LONEOS	·	1.3 km	MPC · JPL
54089	2000 GA_{176}	—	April 2, 2000	Kitt Peak	Spacewatch	·	3.8 km	MPC · JPL
54090	2000 GH_{178}	—	April 2, 2000	Anderson Mesa	LONEOS	·	2.4 km	MPC · JPL
54091	2000 GD_{179}	—	April 4, 2000	Socorro	LINEAR	EUN	4.2 km	MPC · JPL
54092	2000 GZ_{180}	—	April 2, 2000	Socorro	LINEAR	PHO	2.3 km	MPC · JPL
54093	2000 GC_{182}	—	April 2, 2000	Kitt Peak	Spacewatch	·	2.9 km	MPC · JPL
54094	2000 GU_{183}	—	April 5, 2000	Xinglong	SCAP	·	10 km	MPC · JPL
54095	2000 HS_{1}	—	April 25, 2000	Kitt Peak	Spacewatch	V	3.3 km	MPC · JPL
54096	2000 HX_{1}	—	April 25, 2000	Višnjan Observatory	K. Korlević	·	2.9 km	MPC · JPL
54097	2000 HZ_{1}	—	April 26, 2000	Višnjan Observatory	K. Korlević	·	3.2 km	MPC · JPL
54098	2000 HW_{3}	—	April 29, 2000	Socorro	LINEAR	slow	7.4 km	MPC · JPL
54099	2000 HF_{4}	—	April 26, 2000	Kitt Peak	Spacewatch	·	1.7 km	MPC · JPL
54100	2000 HL_{5}	—	April 28, 2000	Prescott	P. G. Comba	·	4.2 km	MPC · JPL

== 54101–54200 ==
back to top

Designation			Discovery			Properties		Ref
Permanent	Provisional	Named after	Date	Site	Discoverer(s)	Category	Diam.	Ref
54101	2000 HM_{5}	—	April 28, 2000	Prescott	P. G. Comba	·	4.1 km	MPC · JPL
54102	2000 HN_{5}	—	April 28, 2000	Prescott	P. G. Comba	THM	6.4 km	MPC · JPL
54103	2000 HX_{6}	—	April 24, 2000	Kitt Peak	Spacewatch	NYS ·	2.3 km	MPC · JPL
54104	2000 HN_{7}	—	April 27, 2000	Socorro	LINEAR	·	2.5 km	MPC · JPL
54105	2000 HZ_{7}	—	April 27, 2000	Socorro	LINEAR	·	2.0 km	MPC · JPL
54106	2000 HX_{8}	—	April 27, 2000	Socorro	LINEAR	V	2.5 km	MPC · JPL
54107	2000 HM_{9}	—	April 27, 2000	Socorro	LINEAR	·	4.7 km	MPC · JPL
54108	2000 HU_{9}	—	April 27, 2000	Socorro	LINEAR	·	9.3 km	MPC · JPL
54109	2000 HD_{10}	—	April 27, 2000	Socorro	LINEAR	THM	9.6 km	MPC · JPL
54110	2000 HA_{11}	—	April 27, 2000	Socorro	LINEAR	·	4.0 km	MPC · JPL
54111	2000 HP_{11}	—	April 30, 2000	Farpoint	Farpoint	·	3.7 km	MPC · JPL
54112	2000 HB_{12}	—	April 28, 2000	Socorro	LINEAR	EOS	4.2 km	MPC · JPL
54113	2000 HP_{12}	—	April 28, 2000	Socorro	LINEAR	·	2.8 km	MPC · JPL
54114	2000 HZ_{12}	—	April 28, 2000	Socorro	LINEAR	·	7.2 km	MPC · JPL
54115	2000 HX_{15}	—	April 29, 2000	Socorro	LINEAR	V	1.4 km	MPC · JPL
54116	2000 HT_{16}	—	April 24, 2000	Kitt Peak	Spacewatch	·	3.9 km	MPC · JPL
54117	2000 HB_{20}	—	April 27, 2000	Kitt Peak	Spacewatch	·	7.0 km	MPC · JPL
54118	2000 HK_{21}	—	April 27, 2000	Socorro	LINEAR	·	3.3 km	MPC · JPL
54119	2000 HW_{21}	—	April 28, 2000	Socorro	LINEAR	·	2.5 km	MPC · JPL
54120	2000 HM_{24}	—	April 24, 2000	Anderson Mesa	LONEOS	·	1.2 km	MPC · JPL
54121	2000 HP_{24}	—	April 24, 2000	Anderson Mesa	LONEOS	·	3.1 km	MPC · JPL
54122	2000 HO_{26}	—	April 30, 2000	Socorro	LINEAR	·	1.5 km	MPC · JPL
54123	2000 HZ_{26}	—	April 27, 2000	Socorro	LINEAR	·	9.2 km	MPC · JPL
54124	2000 HK_{27}	—	April 27, 2000	Socorro	LINEAR	·	6.2 km	MPC · JPL
54125	2000 HL_{27}	—	April 27, 2000	Socorro	LINEAR	·	2.1 km	MPC · JPL
54126	2000 HK_{29}	—	April 28, 2000	Socorro	LINEAR	·	1.7 km	MPC · JPL
54127	2000 HN_{29}	—	April 28, 2000	Socorro	LINEAR	·	5.2 km	MPC · JPL
54128	2000 HW_{30}	—	April 28, 2000	Socorro	LINEAR	EUN	3.5 km	MPC · JPL
54129	2000 HY_{30}	—	April 28, 2000	Socorro	LINEAR	·	4.8 km	MPC · JPL
54130	2000 HE_{31}	—	April 29, 2000	Socorro	LINEAR	·	4.9 km	MPC · JPL
54131	2000 HM_{31}	—	April 29, 2000	Socorro	LINEAR	·	2.8 km	MPC · JPL
54132	2000 HB_{32}	—	April 29, 2000	Socorro	LINEAR	·	2.4 km	MPC · JPL
54133	2000 HU_{32}	—	April 29, 2000	Socorro	LINEAR	·	10 km	MPC · JPL
54134	2000 HK_{34}	—	April 25, 2000	Anderson Mesa	LONEOS	·	2.9 km	MPC · JPL
54135	2000 HU_{34}	—	April 24, 2000	Anderson Mesa	LONEOS	V	1.4 km	MPC · JPL
54136	2000 HG_{35}	—	April 27, 2000	Socorro	LINEAR	·	1.6 km	MPC · JPL
54137	2000 HA_{36}	—	April 28, 2000	Socorro	LINEAR	EUN	3.6 km	MPC · JPL
54138	2000 HC_{36}	—	April 28, 2000	Socorro	LINEAR	·	3.6 km	MPC · JPL
54139	2000 HZ_{36}	—	April 28, 2000	Socorro	LINEAR	MAR	5.5 km	MPC · JPL
54140	2000 HB_{37}	—	April 28, 2000	Socorro	LINEAR	MAR	4.1 km	MPC · JPL
54141	2000 HF_{37}	—	April 28, 2000	Socorro	LINEAR	MAR	2.6 km	MPC · JPL
54142	2000 HL_{39}	—	April 29, 2000	Kitt Peak	Spacewatch	V	2.0 km	MPC · JPL
54143	2000 HO_{39}	—	April 29, 2000	Kitt Peak	Spacewatch	EUN	2.8 km	MPC · JPL
54144	2000 HG_{40}	—	April 30, 2000	Kitt Peak	Spacewatch	·	6.4 km	MPC · JPL
54145	2000 HN_{40}	—	April 30, 2000	Kitt Peak	Spacewatch	EUN ·	6.2 km	MPC · JPL
54146	2000 HY_{40}	—	April 28, 2000	Socorro	LINEAR	·	5.3 km	MPC · JPL
54147	2000 HN_{41}	—	April 28, 2000	Socorro	LINEAR	EUN	3.1 km	MPC · JPL
54148	2000 HS_{41}	—	April 28, 2000	Socorro	LINEAR	·	6.5 km	MPC · JPL
54149	2000 HU_{42}	—	April 29, 2000	Socorro	LINEAR	·	1.6 km	MPC · JPL
54150	2000 HF_{43}	—	April 29, 2000	Socorro	LINEAR	·	3.0 km	MPC · JPL
54151	2000 HO_{45}	—	April 26, 2000	Anderson Mesa	LONEOS	V	2.0 km	MPC · JPL
54152	2000 HX_{45}	—	April 26, 2000	Anderson Mesa	LONEOS	·	2.1 km	MPC · JPL
54153	2000 HN_{46}	—	April 29, 2000	Socorro	LINEAR	V	1.3 km	MPC · JPL
54154	2000 HQ_{46}	—	April 29, 2000	Socorro	LINEAR	·	2.6 km	MPC · JPL
54155	2000 HR_{46}	—	April 29, 2000	Socorro	LINEAR	EMA	8.4 km	MPC · JPL
54156	2000 HK_{47}	—	April 29, 2000	Socorro	LINEAR	·	3.9 km	MPC · JPL
54157	2000 HG_{48}	—	April 29, 2000	Socorro	LINEAR	NYS	3.8 km	MPC · JPL
54158	2000 HY_{48}	—	April 29, 2000	Socorro	LINEAR	MAS	1.4 km	MPC · JPL
54159	2000 HJ_{49}	—	April 29, 2000	Socorro	LINEAR	NYS	3.0 km	MPC · JPL
54160	2000 HH_{51}	—	April 29, 2000	Socorro	LINEAR	(12739)	2.4 km	MPC · JPL
54161	2000 HO_{51}	—	April 29, 2000	Socorro	LINEAR	·	1.8 km	MPC · JPL
54162	2000 HF_{53}	—	April 29, 2000	Socorro	LINEAR	MAS	2.1 km	MPC · JPL
54163	2000 HE_{54}	—	April 29, 2000	Socorro	LINEAR	·	4.4 km	MPC · JPL
54164	2000 HH_{54}	—	April 29, 2000	Socorro	LINEAR	NYS	2.5 km	MPC · JPL
54165	2000 HO_{54}	—	April 29, 2000	Socorro	LINEAR	NYS	2.8 km	MPC · JPL
54166	2000 HV_{54}	—	April 29, 2000	Socorro	LINEAR	·	3.6 km	MPC · JPL
54167	2000 HZ_{54}	—	April 29, 2000	Socorro	LINEAR	ADE	6.6 km	MPC · JPL
54168	2000 HX_{56}	—	April 24, 2000	Anderson Mesa	LONEOS	·	3.0 km	MPC · JPL
54169	2000 HF_{57}	—	April 24, 2000	Anderson Mesa	LONEOS	V	2.7 km	MPC · JPL
54170	2000 HK_{57}	—	April 24, 2000	Anderson Mesa	LONEOS	·	1.7 km	MPC · JPL
54171	2000 HP_{57}	—	April 24, 2000	Anderson Mesa	LONEOS	·	3.0 km	MPC · JPL
54172	2000 HF_{58}	—	April 24, 2000	Kitt Peak	Spacewatch	·	4.2 km	MPC · JPL
54173	2000 HS_{58}	—	April 25, 2000	Anderson Mesa	LONEOS	V	2.5 km	MPC · JPL
54174	2000 HD_{59}	—	April 25, 2000	Anderson Mesa	LONEOS	·	6.7 km	MPC · JPL
54175	2000 HB_{60}	—	April 25, 2000	Anderson Mesa	LONEOS	MAS	1.6 km	MPC · JPL
54176	2000 HO_{61}	—	April 25, 2000	Anderson Mesa	LONEOS	·	1.6 km	MPC · JPL
54177	2000 HX_{61}	—	April 25, 2000	Anderson Mesa	LONEOS	KOR	3.5 km	MPC · JPL
54178	2000 HY_{61}	—	April 25, 2000	Anderson Mesa	LONEOS	NYS ·	3.9 km	MPC · JPL
54179	2000 HO_{62}	—	April 25, 2000	Kitt Peak	Spacewatch	·	2.6 km	MPC · JPL
54180	2000 HT_{63}	—	April 26, 2000	Anderson Mesa	LONEOS	·	3.9 km	MPC · JPL
54181	2000 HR_{65}	—	April 26, 2000	Anderson Mesa	LONEOS	·	3.6 km	MPC · JPL
54182 Galsarid	2000 HA_{66}	Galsarid	April 26, 2000	Anderson Mesa	LONEOS	THM	6.8 km	MPC · JPL
54183	2000 HN_{66}	—	April 26, 2000	Anderson Mesa	LONEOS	·	3.7 km	MPC · JPL
54184	2000 HJ_{67}	—	April 27, 2000	Kitt Peak	Spacewatch	MAS	1.6 km	MPC · JPL
54185	2000 HC_{68}	—	April 27, 2000	Socorro	LINEAR	·	2.3 km	MPC · JPL
54186	2000 HG_{68}	—	April 27, 2000	Socorro	LINEAR	·	3.9 km	MPC · JPL
54187	2000 HR_{74}	—	April 27, 2000	Socorro	LINEAR	·	6.1 km	MPC · JPL
54188	2000 HB_{75}	—	April 27, 2000	Socorro	LINEAR	·	2.8 km	MPC · JPL
54189	2000 HQ_{75}	—	April 27, 2000	Socorro	LINEAR	·	6.5 km	MPC · JPL
54190	2000 HT_{75}	—	April 27, 2000	Socorro	LINEAR	·	5.7 km	MPC · JPL
54191	2000 HE_{76}	—	April 27, 2000	Socorro	LINEAR	·	2.8 km	MPC · JPL
54192	2000 HH_{76}	—	April 27, 2000	Socorro	LINEAR	V	1.4 km	MPC · JPL
54193	2000 HN_{76}	—	April 27, 2000	Socorro	LINEAR	EUN	4.3 km	MPC · JPL
54194	2000 HV_{76}	—	April 27, 2000	Socorro	LINEAR	·	1.3 km	MPC · JPL
54195	2000 HW_{77}	—	April 28, 2000	Socorro	LINEAR	V	1.4 km	MPC · JPL
54196	2000 HH_{78}	—	April 28, 2000	Socorro	LINEAR	·	3.9 km	MPC · JPL
54197	2000 HM_{78}	—	April 28, 2000	Socorro	LINEAR	·	2.3 km	MPC · JPL
54198	2000 HJ_{79}	—	April 28, 2000	Socorro	LINEAR	·	10 km	MPC · JPL
54199	2000 HP_{79}	—	April 28, 2000	Socorro	LINEAR	PHO	2.8 km	MPC · JPL
54200	2000 HK_{80}	—	April 28, 2000	Anderson Mesa	LONEOS	·	2.9 km	MPC · JPL

== 54201–54300 ==
back to top

Designation			Discovery			Properties		Ref
Permanent	Provisional	Named after	Date	Site	Discoverer(s)	Category	Diam.	Ref
54201	2000 HO_{80}	—	April 28, 2000	Anderson Mesa	LONEOS	EUN	4.2 km	MPC · JPL
54202	2000 HQ_{80}	—	April 28, 2000	Anderson Mesa	LONEOS	MAR	2.8 km	MPC · JPL
54203	2000 HR_{80}	—	April 28, 2000	Anderson Mesa	LONEOS	·	4.9 km	MPC · JPL
54204	2000 HX_{80}	—	April 28, 2000	Anderson Mesa	LONEOS	·	3.7 km	MPC · JPL
54205	2000 HY_{82}	—	April 29, 2000	Socorro	LINEAR	GEF	2.8 km	MPC · JPL
54206	2000 HM_{83}	—	April 30, 2000	Anderson Mesa	LONEOS	·	11 km	MPC · JPL
54207	2000 HY_{83}	—	April 30, 2000	Anderson Mesa	LONEOS	EUN	4.2 km	MPC · JPL
54208	2000 HX_{85}	—	April 30, 2000	Anderson Mesa	LONEOS	NEM	4.8 km	MPC · JPL
54209	2000 HD_{86}	—	April 30, 2000	Anderson Mesa	LONEOS	·	2.8 km	MPC · JPL
54210	2000 HV_{87}	—	April 27, 2000	Socorro	LINEAR	·	6.5 km	MPC · JPL
54211	2000 HW_{88}	—	April 29, 2000	Socorro	LINEAR	·	2.7 km	MPC · JPL
54212	2000 HJ_{89}	—	April 29, 2000	Socorro	LINEAR	·	2.1 km	MPC · JPL
54213	2000 HZ_{89}	—	April 29, 2000	Socorro	LINEAR	·	4.6 km	MPC · JPL
54214	2000 HP_{92}	—	April 29, 2000	Socorro	LINEAR	AGN	2.2 km	MPC · JPL
54215	2000 HR_{95}	—	April 28, 2000	Socorro	LINEAR	·	2.2 km	MPC · JPL
54216	2000 HQ_{96}	—	April 28, 2000	Socorro	LINEAR	·	3.9 km	MPC · JPL
54217	2000 HW_{96}	—	April 27, 2000	Kitt Peak	Spacewatch	·	4.9 km	MPC · JPL
54218	2000 HC_{97}	—	April 27, 2000	Anderson Mesa	LONEOS	·	5.6 km	MPC · JPL
54219	2000 HC_{99}	—	April 25, 2000	Anderson Mesa	LONEOS	·	4.7 km	MPC · JPL
54220	2000 HJ_{100}	—	April 24, 2000	Anderson Mesa	LONEOS	·	6.2 km	MPC · JPL
54221	2000 HN_{100}	—	April 24, 2000	Anderson Mesa	LONEOS	V	2.1 km	MPC · JPL
54222	2000 JF	—	May 3, 2000	Kleť	Kleť	EOS	7.2 km	MPC · JPL
54223	2000 JU	—	May 1, 2000	Socorro	LINEAR	EUN	3.8 km	MPC · JPL
54224	2000 JM_{6}	—	May 4, 2000	Socorro	LINEAR	·	5.7 km	MPC · JPL
54225	2000 JU_{7}	—	May 4, 2000	Kitt Peak	Spacewatch	·	5.0 km	MPC · JPL
54226	2000 JA_{10}	—	May 5, 2000	Socorro	LINEAR	PHO	4.3 km	MPC · JPL
54227	2000 JE_{11}	—	May 3, 2000	Socorro	LINEAR	·	3.5 km	MPC · JPL
54228	2000 JA_{12}	—	May 5, 2000	Socorro	LINEAR	V	1.9 km	MPC · JPL
54229	2000 JA_{13}	—	May 6, 2000	Socorro	LINEAR	slow	4.5 km	MPC · JPL
54230	2000 JO_{13}	—	May 6, 2000	Socorro	LINEAR	NYS	1.6 km	MPC · JPL
54231	2000 JO_{14}	—	May 6, 2000	Socorro	LINEAR	NYS	2.6 km	MPC · JPL
54232	2000 JL_{15}	—	May 9, 2000	Prescott	P. G. Comba	KOR	3.0 km	MPC · JPL
54233	2000 JZ_{15}	—	May 5, 2000	Socorro	LINEAR	EOS	4.6 km	MPC · JPL
54234	2000 JD_{16}	—	May 6, 2000	Socorro	LINEAR	H	1.5 km	MPC · JPL
54235	2000 JO_{16}	—	May 5, 2000	Socorro	LINEAR	·	3.1 km	MPC · JPL
54236	2000 JH_{17}	—	May 5, 2000	Socorro	LINEAR	slow	2.5 km	MPC · JPL
54237 Hiroshimanabe	2000 JD_{18}	Hiroshimanabe	May 5, 2000	Kuma Kogen	A. Nakamura	LIX	8.1 km	MPC · JPL
54238	2000 JD_{19}	—	May 3, 2000	Socorro	LINEAR	·	11 km	MPC · JPL
54239	2000 JF_{19}	—	May 3, 2000	Socorro	LINEAR	PHO	2.6 km	MPC · JPL
54240	2000 JR_{19}	—	May 4, 2000	Socorro	LINEAR	T_{j} (2.99) · EUP	13 km	MPC · JPL
54241	2000 JY_{19}	—	May 6, 2000	Socorro	LINEAR	·	2.6 km	MPC · JPL
54242	2000 JC_{20}	—	May 6, 2000	Socorro	LINEAR	·	1.9 km	MPC · JPL
54243	2000 JG_{20}	—	May 6, 2000	Socorro	LINEAR	·	3.7 km	MPC · JPL
54244	2000 JR_{20}	—	May 6, 2000	Socorro	LINEAR	·	2.6 km	MPC · JPL
54245	2000 JE_{21}	—	May 6, 2000	Socorro	LINEAR	·	3.8 km	MPC · JPL
54246	2000 JF_{21}	—	May 6, 2000	Socorro	LINEAR	·	3.2 km	MPC · JPL
54247	2000 JN_{24}	—	May 7, 2000	Socorro	LINEAR	·	7.0 km	MPC · JPL
54248	2000 JH_{25}	—	May 7, 2000	Socorro	LINEAR	V	1.6 km	MPC · JPL
54249	2000 JV_{25}	—	May 7, 2000	Socorro	LINEAR	V	1.7 km	MPC · JPL
54250	2000 JC_{26}	—	May 7, 2000	Socorro	LINEAR	V	1.9 km	MPC · JPL
54251	2000 JO_{26}	—	May 7, 2000	Socorro	LINEAR	·	2.3 km	MPC · JPL
54252	2000 JV_{26}	—	May 7, 2000	Socorro	LINEAR	·	4.1 km	MPC · JPL
54253	2000 JP_{27}	—	May 7, 2000	Socorro	LINEAR	(13314) ·	4.7 km	MPC · JPL
54254	2000 JQ_{27}	—	May 7, 2000	Socorro	LINEAR	·	1.7 km	MPC · JPL
54255	2000 JL_{28}	—	May 7, 2000	Socorro	LINEAR	·	2.5 km	MPC · JPL
54256	2000 JC_{30}	—	May 7, 2000	Socorro	LINEAR	·	3.8 km	MPC · JPL
54257	2000 JK_{30}	—	May 7, 2000	Socorro	LINEAR	·	2.8 km	MPC · JPL
54258	2000 JV_{30}	—	May 7, 2000	Socorro	LINEAR	·	3.1 km	MPC · JPL
54259	2000 JC_{32}	—	May 7, 2000	Socorro	LINEAR	·	2.9 km	MPC · JPL
54260	2000 JF_{32}	—	May 7, 2000	Socorro	LINEAR	·	2.2 km	MPC · JPL
54261	2000 JV_{32}	—	May 7, 2000	Socorro	LINEAR	·	3.2 km	MPC · JPL
54262	2000 JX_{32}	—	May 7, 2000	Socorro	LINEAR	·	1.6 km	MPC · JPL
54263	2000 JD_{33}	—	May 7, 2000	Socorro	LINEAR	·	3.2 km	MPC · JPL
54264	2000 JN_{33}	—	May 7, 2000	Socorro	LINEAR	NYS	3.1 km	MPC · JPL
54265	2000 JS_{33}	—	May 7, 2000	Socorro	LINEAR	V	2.0 km	MPC · JPL
54266	2000 JC_{34}	—	May 7, 2000	Socorro	LINEAR	·	1.7 km	MPC · JPL
54267	2000 JD_{35}	—	May 7, 2000	Socorro	LINEAR	V	1.6 km	MPC · JPL
54268	2000 JR_{35}	—	May 7, 2000	Socorro	LINEAR	HYG	5.8 km	MPC · JPL
54269	2000 JZ_{36}	—	May 7, 2000	Socorro	LINEAR	·	2.3 km	MPC · JPL
54270	2000 JC_{39}	—	May 7, 2000	Socorro	LINEAR	·	7.7 km	MPC · JPL
54271	2000 JD_{39}	—	May 7, 2000	Socorro	LINEAR	V	3.7 km	MPC · JPL
54272	2000 JT_{40}	—	May 6, 2000	Socorro	LINEAR	KOR	3.0 km	MPC · JPL
54273	2000 JC_{41}	—	May 6, 2000	Socorro	LINEAR	MAS	1.9 km	MPC · JPL
54274	2000 JK_{42}	—	May 7, 2000	Socorro	LINEAR	·	2.1 km	MPC · JPL
54275	2000 JF_{43}	—	May 7, 2000	Socorro	LINEAR	NYS	1.6 km	MPC · JPL
54276	2000 JG_{45}	—	May 7, 2000	Socorro	LINEAR	·	5.9 km	MPC · JPL
54277	2000 JD_{46}	—	May 7, 2000	Socorro	LINEAR	·	3.6 km	MPC · JPL
54278	2000 JZ_{46}	—	May 9, 2000	Socorro	LINEAR	·	3.6 km	MPC · JPL
54279	2000 JC_{47}	—	May 9, 2000	Socorro	LINEAR	V	1.5 km	MPC · JPL
54280	2000 JF_{47}	—	May 9, 2000	Socorro	LINEAR	·	4.1 km	MPC · JPL
54281	2000 JP_{47}	—	May 9, 2000	Socorro	LINEAR	V	2.4 km	MPC · JPL
54282	2000 JX_{47}	—	May 9, 2000	Socorro	LINEAR	·	3.1 km	MPC · JPL
54283	2000 JG_{48}	—	May 9, 2000	Socorro	LINEAR	·	3.2 km	MPC · JPL
54284	2000 JM_{50}	—	May 9, 2000	Socorro	LINEAR	·	3.4 km	MPC · JPL
54285	2000 JR_{50}	—	May 9, 2000	Socorro	LINEAR	·	2.7 km	MPC · JPL
54286	2000 JD_{51}	—	May 9, 2000	Socorro	LINEAR	LIX	9.3 km	MPC · JPL
54287	2000 JE_{51}	—	May 9, 2000	Socorro	LINEAR	·	3.9 km	MPC · JPL
54288 Daikikawasaki	2000 JV_{53}	Daikikawasaki	May 4, 2000	Nanyo	T. Okuni	EUN	4.2 km	MPC · JPL
54289	2000 JE_{56}	—	May 6, 2000	Socorro	LINEAR	·	2.1 km	MPC · JPL
54290	2000 JM_{56}	—	May 6, 2000	Socorro	LINEAR	·	2.3 km	MPC · JPL
54291	2000 JD_{57}	—	May 6, 2000	Socorro	LINEAR	·	5.0 km	MPC · JPL
54292	2000 JT_{58}	—	May 6, 2000	Socorro	LINEAR	·	2.9 km	MPC · JPL
54293	2000 JB_{59}	—	May 6, 2000	Socorro	LINEAR	EOS	8.0 km	MPC · JPL
54294	2000 JC_{59}	—	May 6, 2000	Socorro	LINEAR	·	4.3 km	MPC · JPL
54295	2000 JO_{59}	—	May 7, 2000	Socorro	LINEAR	·	3.9 km	MPC · JPL
54296	2000 JN_{60}	—	May 7, 2000	Socorro	LINEAR	·	2.4 km	MPC · JPL
54297	2000 JA_{61}	—	May 7, 2000	Socorro	LINEAR	·	4.4 km	MPC · JPL
54298	2000 JE_{62}	—	May 7, 2000	Socorro	LINEAR	·	3.2 km	MPC · JPL
54299	2000 JV_{62}	—	May 9, 2000	Socorro	LINEAR	V	2.7 km	MPC · JPL
54300	2000 JZ_{63}	—	May 10, 2000	Socorro	LINEAR	NYS	2.6 km	MPC · JPL

== 54301–54400 ==
back to top

Designation			Discovery			Properties		Ref
Permanent	Provisional	Named after	Date	Site	Discoverer(s)	Category	Diam.	Ref
54301	2000 JG_{64}	—	May 10, 2000	Socorro	LINEAR	·	3.6 km	MPC · JPL
54302	2000 JA_{66}	—	May 6, 2000	Socorro	LINEAR	slow	3.6 km	MPC · JPL
54303	2000 JD_{66}	—	May 6, 2000	Socorro	LINEAR	·	6.4 km	MPC · JPL
54304	2000 JE_{66}	—	May 6, 2000	Socorro	LINEAR	EUN	3.1 km	MPC · JPL
54305	2000 JB_{69}	—	May 1, 2000	Anderson Mesa	LONEOS	·	5.4 km	MPC · JPL
54306	2000 JC_{70}	—	May 2, 2000	Socorro	LINEAR	·	12 km	MPC · JPL
54307	2000 JT_{71}	—	May 1, 2000	Anderson Mesa	LONEOS	·	2.0 km	MPC · JPL
54308	2000 JF_{73}	—	May 2, 2000	Anderson Mesa	LONEOS	GEF	3.4 km	MPC · JPL
54309	2000 JN_{73}	—	May 2, 2000	Anderson Mesa	LONEOS	PHO	2.7 km	MPC · JPL
54310	2000 JO_{73}	—	May 2, 2000	Anderson Mesa	LONEOS	MAR	4.0 km	MPC · JPL
54311	2000 JR_{73}	—	May 2, 2000	Anderson Mesa	LONEOS	·	8.1 km	MPC · JPL
54312	2000 JZ_{73}	—	May 2, 2000	Kitt Peak	Spacewatch	·	2.8 km	MPC · JPL
54313	2000 JL_{75}	—	May 3, 2000	Socorro	LINEAR	·	2.0 km	MPC · JPL
54314	2000 JS_{75}	—	May 5, 2000	Socorro	LINEAR	·	1.9 km	MPC · JPL
54315	2000 JU_{75}	—	May 5, 2000	Socorro	LINEAR	·	2.6 km	MPC · JPL
54316	2000 JV_{75}	—	May 6, 2000	Socorro	LINEAR	·	6.1 km	MPC · JPL
54317	2000 JD_{76}	—	May 6, 2000	Socorro	LINEAR	MAR	2.8 km	MPC · JPL
54318	2000 JF_{76}	—	May 6, 2000	Socorro	LINEAR	LEO	4.8 km	MPC · JPL
54319	2000 JG_{76}	—	May 6, 2000	Socorro	LINEAR	·	3.8 km	MPC · JPL
54320	2000 JL_{80}	—	May 6, 2000	Kitt Peak	Spacewatch	THM	7.0 km	MPC · JPL
54321	2000 JA_{81}	—	May 15, 2000	Črni Vrh	Mikuž, H.	·	4.5 km	MPC · JPL
54322	2000 JZ_{83}	—	May 5, 2000	Socorro	LINEAR	slow	3.6 km	MPC · JPL
54323	2000 JQ_{86}	—	May 1, 2000	Socorro	LINEAR	HNS	4.3 km	MPC · JPL
54324	2000 KO_{3}	—	May 27, 2000	Socorro	LINEAR	V	1.8 km	MPC · JPL
54325	2000 KP_{3}	—	May 27, 2000	Socorro	LINEAR	HYG	7.4 km	MPC · JPL
54326	2000 KY_{3}	—	May 27, 2000	Socorro	LINEAR	V	3.1 km	MPC · JPL
54327	2000 KB_{4}	—	May 27, 2000	Prescott	P. G. Comba	·	3.7 km	MPC · JPL
54328	2000 KO_{5}	—	May 28, 2000	Socorro	LINEAR	PHO	2.7 km	MPC · JPL
54329	2000 KD_{6}	—	May 27, 2000	Socorro	LINEAR	·	7.8 km	MPC · JPL
54330	2000 KH_{7}	—	May 27, 2000	Socorro	LINEAR	EOS	6.0 km	MPC · JPL
54331	2000 KS_{7}	—	May 27, 2000	Socorro	LINEAR	·	5.5 km	MPC · JPL
54332	2000 KQ_{9}	—	May 28, 2000	Socorro	LINEAR	NYS ·	3.1 km	MPC · JPL
54333	2000 KJ_{10}	—	May 28, 2000	Socorro	LINEAR	WIT	2.3 km	MPC · JPL
54334	2000 KS_{10}	—	May 28, 2000	Socorro	LINEAR	NAE	7.4 km	MPC · JPL
54335	2000 KJ_{12}	—	May 28, 2000	Socorro	LINEAR	EUN	3.1 km	MPC · JPL
54336	2000 KU_{13}	—	May 28, 2000	Socorro	LINEAR	EUN ·	3.4 km	MPC · JPL
54337	2000 KL_{15}	—	May 28, 2000	Socorro	LINEAR	·	4.5 km	MPC · JPL
54338	2000 KN_{18}	—	May 28, 2000	Socorro	LINEAR	·	3.5 km	MPC · JPL
54339	2000 KA_{19}	—	May 28, 2000	Socorro	LINEAR	·	4.7 km	MPC · JPL
54340	2000 KX_{22}	—	May 28, 2000	Socorro	LINEAR	·	3.3 km	MPC · JPL
54341	2000 KD_{24}	—	May 28, 2000	Socorro	LINEAR	·	3.2 km	MPC · JPL
54342	2000 KF_{24}	—	May 28, 2000	Socorro	LINEAR	EOS	7.5 km	MPC · JPL
54343	2000 KY_{26}	—	May 28, 2000	Socorro	LINEAR	PAD	6.7 km	MPC · JPL
54344	2000 KK_{27}	—	May 28, 2000	Socorro	LINEAR	EUN	4.1 km	MPC · JPL
54345	2000 KS_{28}	—	May 28, 2000	Socorro	LINEAR	·	3.8 km	MPC · JPL
54346	2000 KZ_{28}	—	May 28, 2000	Socorro	LINEAR	·	3.0 km	MPC · JPL
54347	2000 KB_{29}	—	May 28, 2000	Socorro	LINEAR	·	2.0 km	MPC · JPL
54348	2000 KP_{29}	—	May 28, 2000	Socorro	LINEAR	·	9.2 km	MPC · JPL
54349	2000 KX_{29}	—	May 28, 2000	Socorro	LINEAR	THM	10 km	MPC · JPL
54350	2000 KO_{30}	—	May 28, 2000	Socorro	LINEAR	·	2.7 km	MPC · JPL
54351	2000 KV_{30}	—	May 28, 2000	Socorro	LINEAR	·	3.7 km	MPC · JPL
54352	2000 KK_{31}	—	May 28, 2000	Socorro	LINEAR	·	2.4 km	MPC · JPL
54353	2000 KH_{32}	—	May 29, 2000	Socorro	LINEAR	·	3.3 km	MPC · JPL
54354	2000 KO_{32}	—	May 28, 2000	Socorro	LINEAR	VER	7.9 km	MPC · JPL
54355	2000 KJ_{33}	—	May 28, 2000	Socorro	LINEAR	·	4.1 km	MPC · JPL
54356	2000 KK_{33}	—	May 28, 2000	Socorro	LINEAR	·	3.5 km	MPC · JPL
54357	2000 KN_{33}	—	May 28, 2000	Socorro	LINEAR	·	3.8 km	MPC · JPL
54358	2000 KM_{35}	—	May 27, 2000	Socorro	LINEAR	·	5.0 km	MPC · JPL
54359	2000 KD_{36}	—	May 27, 2000	Socorro	LINEAR	·	4.8 km	MPC · JPL
54360	2000 KK_{36}	—	May 27, 2000	Socorro	LINEAR	(5)	4.4 km	MPC · JPL
54361	2000 KM_{37}	—	May 24, 2000	Kitt Peak	Spacewatch	(5)	2.4 km	MPC · JPL
54362 Restitutum	2000 KP_{38}	Restitutum	May 27, 2000	Anza	M. Collins, White, M.	EUN	3.1 km	MPC · JPL
54363	2000 KH_{39}	—	May 24, 2000	Kitt Peak	Spacewatch	·	2.2 km	MPC · JPL
54364	2000 KN_{42}	—	May 28, 2000	Socorro	LINEAR	·	3.5 km	MPC · JPL
54365	2000 KO_{42}	—	May 28, 2000	Socorro	LINEAR	MAR	3.0 km	MPC · JPL
54366	2000 KL_{43}	—	May 26, 2000	Kitt Peak	Spacewatch	·	3.7 km	MPC · JPL
54367	2000 KL_{48}	—	May 27, 2000	Socorro	LINEAR	·	3.4 km	MPC · JPL
54368	2000 KM_{50}	—	May 23, 2000	Anderson Mesa	LONEOS	·	2.6 km	MPC · JPL
54369	2000 KS_{50}	—	May 27, 2000	Socorro	LINEAR	EOS	6.6 km	MPC · JPL
54370	2000 KT_{50}	—	May 27, 2000	Socorro	LINEAR	EOS	6.7 km	MPC · JPL
54371	2000 KC_{52}	—	May 23, 2000	Anderson Mesa	LONEOS	·	2.5 km	MPC · JPL
54372	2000 KN_{53}	—	May 28, 2000	Socorro	LINEAR	·	12 km	MPC · JPL
54373	2000 KZ_{53}	—	May 27, 2000	Anderson Mesa	LONEOS	·	3.1 km	MPC · JPL
54374	2000 KM_{55}	—	May 27, 2000	Socorro	LINEAR	V	2.8 km	MPC · JPL
54375	2000 KO_{55}	—	May 27, 2000	Socorro	LINEAR	·	6.2 km	MPC · JPL
54376	2000 KV_{56}	—	May 27, 2000	Socorro	LINEAR	NYS	3.2 km	MPC · JPL
54377	2000 KE_{58}	—	May 24, 2000	Anderson Mesa	LONEOS	MAR	2.4 km	MPC · JPL
54378	2000 KB_{60}	—	May 25, 2000	Anderson Mesa	LONEOS	·	2.4 km	MPC · JPL
54379	2000 KA_{61}	—	May 25, 2000	Anderson Mesa	LONEOS	·	3.0 km	MPC · JPL
54380	2000 KR_{61}	—	May 25, 2000	Anderson Mesa	LONEOS	·	3.1 km	MPC · JPL
54381	2000 KD_{62}	—	May 26, 2000	Anderson Mesa	LONEOS	·	4.2 km	MPC · JPL
54382	2000 KM_{62}	—	May 26, 2000	Anderson Mesa	LONEOS	·	6.8 km	MPC · JPL
54383	2000 KC_{63}	—	May 26, 2000	Anderson Mesa	LONEOS	·	6.9 km	MPC · JPL
54384	2000 KU_{63}	—	May 26, 2000	Anderson Mesa	LONEOS	·	2.7 km	MPC · JPL
54385	2000 KB_{64}	—	May 26, 2000	Anderson Mesa	LONEOS	ADE	5.2 km	MPC · JPL
54386	2000 KD_{64}	—	May 26, 2000	Anderson Mesa	LONEOS	EUN	3.1 km	MPC · JPL
54387	2000 KF_{64}	—	May 26, 2000	Anderson Mesa	LONEOS	MAR	3.5 km	MPC · JPL
54388	2000 KD_{65}	—	May 27, 2000	Socorro	LINEAR	·	4.3 km	MPC · JPL
54389	2000 KS_{65}	—	May 27, 2000	Anderson Mesa	LONEOS	·	3.0 km	MPC · JPL
54390	2000 KZ_{66}	—	May 28, 2000	Socorro	LINEAR	PHO	3.2 km	MPC · JPL
54391 Adammckay	2000 KO_{67}	Adammckay	May 31, 2000	Anderson Mesa	LONEOS	WAT	11 km	MPC · JPL
54392	2000 KH_{70}	—	May 28, 2000	Socorro	LINEAR	KOR	3.0 km	MPC · JPL
54393	2000 KX_{72}	—	May 28, 2000	Socorro	LINEAR	·	3.8 km	MPC · JPL
54394	2000 KB_{73}	—	May 28, 2000	Socorro	LINEAR	·	4.6 km	MPC · JPL
54395	2000 KD_{75}	—	May 27, 2000	Socorro	LINEAR	·	2.9 km	MPC · JPL
54396	2000 KW_{78}	—	May 27, 2000	Socorro	LINEAR	·	8.9 km	MPC · JPL
54397	2000 KC_{80}	—	May 27, 2000	Socorro	LINEAR	·	1.8 km	MPC · JPL
54398	2000 KP_{82}	—	May 23, 2000	Anderson Mesa	LONEOS	·	3.8 km	MPC · JPL
54399	2000 KV_{82}	—	May 26, 2000	Anderson Mesa	LONEOS	·	2.4 km	MPC · JPL
54400	2000 LD	—	June 1, 2000	Prescott	P. G. Comba	·	4.9 km	MPC · JPL

== 54401–54500 ==
back to top

Designation			Discovery			Properties		Ref
Permanent	Provisional	Named after	Date	Site	Discoverer(s)	Category	Diam.	Ref
54401	2000 LM	—	June 1, 2000	Socorro	LINEAR	AMO +1km	1.2 km	MPC · JPL
54402 Jonathanbradshaw	2000 LA_{2}	Jonathanbradshaw	June 4, 2000	Reedy Creek	J. Broughton	EOS	5.8 km	MPC · JPL
54403 Langersek	2000 LD_{2}	Langersek	June 4, 2000	Reedy Creek	J. Broughton	·	6.2 km	MPC · JPL
54404	2000 LO_{3}	—	June 4, 2000	Socorro	LINEAR	·	4.7 km	MPC · JPL
54405	2000 LL_{4}	—	June 4, 2000	Socorro	LINEAR	GEF	3.2 km	MPC · JPL
54406	2000 LR_{4}	—	June 5, 2000	Socorro	LINEAR	·	4.6 km	MPC · JPL
54407	2000 LU_{6}	—	June 1, 2000	Kitt Peak	Spacewatch	·	3.3 km	MPC · JPL
54408	2000 LZ_{6}	—	June 1, 2000	Kitt Peak	Spacewatch	·	6.0 km	MPC · JPL
54409	2000 LD_{8}	—	June 6, 2000	Socorro	LINEAR	·	1.7 km	MPC · JPL
54410	2000 LG_{9}	—	June 5, 2000	Socorro	LINEAR	·	4.2 km	MPC · JPL
54411 Bobestelle	2000 LH_{10}	Bobestelle	June 3, 2000	Mauna Kea	Stetson, P. B., D. D. Balam	·	7.6 km	MPC · JPL
54412	2000 LU_{10}	—	June 4, 2000	Socorro	LINEAR	·	4.7 km	MPC · JPL
54413	2000 LL_{11}	—	June 4, 2000	Socorro	LINEAR	·	6.4 km	MPC · JPL
54414	2000 LA_{13}	—	June 5, 2000	Socorro	LINEAR	EOS	6.5 km	MPC · JPL
54415	2000 LR_{13}	—	June 6, 2000	Socorro	LINEAR	EOS	6.2 km	MPC · JPL
54416	2000 LR_{14}	—	June 7, 2000	Socorro	LINEAR	·	3.0 km	MPC · JPL
54417	2000 LH_{17}	—	June 5, 2000	Socorro	LINEAR	·	1.9 km	MPC · JPL
54418	2000 LO_{17}	—	June 7, 2000	Socorro	LINEAR	EUN	6.4 km	MPC · JPL
54419	2000 LA_{20}	—	June 8, 2000	Socorro	LINEAR	PHO	4.3 km	MPC · JPL
54420	2000 LT_{20}	—	June 8, 2000	Socorro	LINEAR	·	6.8 km	MPC · JPL
54421	2000 LG_{23}	—	June 1, 2000	Anderson Mesa	LONEOS	EUN	3.9 km	MPC · JPL
54422	2000 LK_{23}	—	June 3, 2000	Anderson Mesa	LONEOS	EUN	3.2 km	MPC · JPL
54423	2000 LO_{24}	—	June 1, 2000	Socorro	LINEAR	·	10 km	MPC · JPL
54424	2000 LP_{24}	—	June 1, 2000	Socorro	LINEAR	·	4.4 km	MPC · JPL
54425	2000 LX_{24}	—	June 1, 2000	Socorro	LINEAR	·	5.4 km	MPC · JPL
54426	2000 LR_{25}	—	June 7, 2000	Socorro	LINEAR	·	4.8 km	MPC · JPL
54427	2000 LG_{27}	—	June 6, 2000	Anderson Mesa	LONEOS	EOS	7.4 km	MPC · JPL
54428	2000 LN_{27}	—	June 6, 2000	Anderson Mesa	LONEOS	·	17 km	MPC · JPL
54429	2000 LN_{28}	—	June 9, 2000	Anderson Mesa	LONEOS	·	5.2 km	MPC · JPL
54430	2000 LZ_{29}	—	June 7, 2000	Socorro	LINEAR	·	5.5 km	MPC · JPL
54431	2000 LA_{31}	—	June 6, 2000	Anderson Mesa	LONEOS	·	2.3 km	MPC · JPL
54432	2000 LG_{31}	—	June 6, 2000	Anderson Mesa	LONEOS	EUN	6.7 km	MPC · JPL
54433	2000 LH_{32}	—	June 5, 2000	Anderson Mesa	LONEOS	EOS	4.9 km	MPC · JPL
54434	2000 LU_{33}	—	June 4, 2000	Haleakala	NEAT	·	4.7 km	MPC · JPL
54435	2000 LM_{35}	—	June 1, 2000	Anderson Mesa	LONEOS	·	7.8 km	MPC · JPL
54436	2000 LK_{36}	—	June 1, 2000	Haleakala	NEAT	·	6.0 km	MPC · JPL
54437	2000 MW	—	June 24, 2000	Reedy Creek	J. Broughton	MAR	4.1 km	MPC · JPL
54438	2000 MB_{2}	—	June 25, 2000	Farpoint	Farpoint	·	3.9 km	MPC · JPL
54439 Topeka	2000 MG_{3}	Topeka	June 29, 2000	Farpoint	G. Hug	·	4.0 km	MPC · JPL
54440	2000 MP_{3}	—	June 24, 2000	Socorro	LINEAR	·	3.1 km	MPC · JPL
54441	2000 MP_{5}	—	June 26, 2000	Socorro	LINEAR	·	5.3 km	MPC · JPL
54442	2000 MS_{5}	—	June 25, 2000	Socorro	LINEAR	·	6.1 km	MPC · JPL
54443	2000 MT_{5}	—	June 25, 2000	Socorro	LINEAR	PHO	3.7 km	MPC · JPL
54444	2000 MU_{5}	—	June 25, 2000	Socorro	LINEAR	·	17 km	MPC · JPL
54445	2000 MW_{5}	—	June 25, 2000	Socorro	LINEAR	EUN	5.5 km	MPC · JPL
54446	2000 MY_{5}	—	June 23, 2000	Kitt Peak	Spacewatch	MRX	2.5 km	MPC · JPL
54447	2000 NX_{1}	—	July 5, 2000	Reedy Creek	J. Broughton	MAR	3.8 km	MPC · JPL
54448	2000 NZ_{2}	—	July 6, 2000	Socorro	LINEAR	PHO	6.3 km	MPC · JPL
54449	2000 NY_{7}	—	July 5, 2000	Kitt Peak	Spacewatch	GEF	3.6 km	MPC · JPL
54450	2000 NT_{10}	—	July 6, 2000	Anderson Mesa	LONEOS	GEF	2.9 km	MPC · JPL
54451	2000 NV_{10}	—	July 6, 2000	Anderson Mesa	LONEOS	·	12 km	MPC · JPL
54452	2000 NX_{13}	—	July 5, 2000	Anderson Mesa	LONEOS	slow	4.7 km	MPC · JPL
54453	2000 NL_{15}	—	July 5, 2000	Anderson Mesa	LONEOS	EOS	6.4 km	MPC · JPL
54454	2000 NA_{16}	—	July 5, 2000	Anderson Mesa	LONEOS	KOR	3.9 km	MPC · JPL
54455	2000 NW_{16}	—	July 5, 2000	Anderson Mesa	LONEOS	·	3.8 km	MPC · JPL
54456	2000 NJ_{17}	—	July 5, 2000	Anderson Mesa	LONEOS	·	5.3 km	MPC · JPL
54457	2000 NC_{24}	—	July 5, 2000	Kitt Peak	Spacewatch	·	6.8 km	MPC · JPL
54458	2000 NM_{24}	—	July 4, 2000	Anderson Mesa	LONEOS	·	4.1 km	MPC · JPL
54459	2000 NX_{24}	—	July 4, 2000	Anderson Mesa	LONEOS	·	3.5 km	MPC · JPL
54460	2000 NU_{28}	—	July 2, 2000	Kitt Peak	Spacewatch	·	7.6 km	MPC · JPL
54461	2000 NA_{29}	—	July 2, 2000	Kitt Peak	Spacewatch	·	12 km	MPC · JPL
54462	2000 NC_{29}	—	July 4, 2000	Anderson Mesa	LONEOS	·	6.8 km	MPC · JPL
54463	2000 OS_{1}	—	July 27, 2000	Reedy Creek	J. Broughton	·	4.0 km	MPC · JPL
54464	2000 OX_{1}	—	July 23, 2000	Socorro	LINEAR	EOS	6.0 km	MPC · JPL
54465	2000 OE_{4}	—	July 24, 2000	Socorro	LINEAR	·	6.8 km	MPC · JPL
54466	2000 OO_{4}	—	July 24, 2000	Socorro	LINEAR	EUN	4.3 km	MPC · JPL
54467	2000 OE_{6}	—	July 24, 2000	Socorro	LINEAR	·	5.6 km	MPC · JPL
54468	2000 OA_{7}	—	July 29, 2000	Črni Vrh	Mikuž, H.	EUN	3.5 km	MPC · JPL
54469	2000 OM_{8}	—	July 30, 2000	Črni Vrh	Mikuž, H.	·	4.9 km	MPC · JPL
54470	2000 OE_{10}	—	July 23, 2000	Socorro	LINEAR	·	5.1 km	MPC · JPL
54471	2000 OC_{11}	—	July 23, 2000	Socorro	LINEAR	WIT	3.2 km	MPC · JPL
54472	2000 OL_{11}	—	July 23, 2000	Socorro	LINEAR	KOR	3.8 km	MPC · JPL
54473	2000 OK_{13}	—	July 23, 2000	Socorro	LINEAR	EOS	8.1 km	MPC · JPL
54474	2000 OV_{13}	—	July 23, 2000	Socorro	LINEAR	EOS	6.4 km	MPC · JPL
54475	2000 OC_{16}	—	July 23, 2000	Socorro	LINEAR	·	5.2 km	MPC · JPL
54476	2000 OK_{16}	—	July 23, 2000	Socorro	LINEAR	·	14 km	MPC · JPL
54477	2000 OM_{17}	—	July 23, 2000	Socorro	LINEAR	·	5.7 km	MPC · JPL
54478	2000 OG_{23}	—	July 23, 2000	Socorro	LINEAR	·	9.0 km	MPC · JPL
54479	2000 OX_{23}	—	July 23, 2000	Socorro	LINEAR	EOS	5.2 km	MPC · JPL
54480	2000 OB_{24}	—	July 23, 2000	Socorro	LINEAR	RAF	3.4 km	MPC · JPL
54481	2000 OB_{25}	—	July 23, 2000	Socorro	LINEAR	EUN	4.4 km	MPC · JPL
54482	2000 OE_{25}	—	July 23, 2000	Socorro	LINEAR	·	4.9 km	MPC · JPL
54483	2000 OF_{26}	—	July 23, 2000	Socorro	LINEAR	·	2.2 km	MPC · JPL
54484	2000 OJ_{26}	—	July 23, 2000	Socorro	LINEAR	·	5.5 km	MPC · JPL
54485	2000 OR_{27}	—	July 23, 2000	Socorro	LINEAR	fast	6.0 km	MPC · JPL
54486	2000 OO_{29}	—	July 30, 2000	Socorro	LINEAR	EOS	4.8 km	MPC · JPL
54487	2000 OD_{30}	—	July 30, 2000	Socorro	LINEAR	EOS	4.7 km	MPC · JPL
54488	2000 OG_{32}	—	July 30, 2000	Socorro	LINEAR	EOS	5.9 km	MPC · JPL
54489	2000 OZ_{32}	—	July 30, 2000	Socorro	LINEAR	MAR	3.2 km	MPC · JPL
54490	2000 ON_{34}	—	July 30, 2000	Socorro	LINEAR	GEF	4.0 km	MPC · JPL
54491	2000 OD_{35}	—	July 30, 2000	Socorro	LINEAR	EOS	4.4 km	MPC · JPL
54492	2000 OB_{36}	—	July 23, 2000	Socorro	LINEAR	slow ·	4.3 km	MPC · JPL
54493	2000 OP_{37}	—	July 30, 2000	Socorro	LINEAR	·	3.2 km	MPC · JPL
54494	2000 OB_{38}	—	July 30, 2000	Socorro	LINEAR	·	4.7 km	MPC · JPL
54495	2000 OL_{38}	—	July 30, 2000	Socorro	LINEAR	·	4.8 km	MPC · JPL
54496	2000 OT_{40}	—	July 30, 2000	Socorro	LINEAR	·	8.1 km	MPC · JPL
54497	2000 OF_{41}	—	July 30, 2000	Socorro	LINEAR	·	5.2 km	MPC · JPL
54498	2000 OK_{41}	—	July 30, 2000	Socorro	LINEAR	·	9.1 km	MPC · JPL
54499	2000 OS_{41}	—	July 30, 2000	Socorro	LINEAR	·	4.4 km	MPC · JPL
54500	2000 OR_{44}	—	July 30, 2000	Socorro	LINEAR	·	5.6 km	MPC · JPL

== 54501–54600 ==
back to top

Designation			Discovery			Properties		Ref
Permanent	Provisional	Named after	Date	Site	Discoverer(s)	Category	Diam.	Ref
54501	2000 OB_{52}	—	July 31, 2000	Socorro	LINEAR	·	5.1 km	MPC · JPL
54502	2000 OX_{52}	—	July 31, 2000	Socorro	LINEAR	slow	2.5 km	MPC · JPL
54503	2000 OV_{53}	—	July 30, 2000	Socorro	LINEAR	URS	10 km	MPC · JPL
54504	2000 OV_{54}	—	July 29, 2000	Anderson Mesa	LONEOS	KOR	3.7 km	MPC · JPL
54505	2000 OK_{55}	—	July 29, 2000	Anderson Mesa	LONEOS	KOR	3.3 km	MPC · JPL
54506	2000 OA_{57}	—	July 29, 2000	Anderson Mesa	LONEOS	·	8.3 km	MPC · JPL
54507	2000 OD_{59}	—	July 29, 2000	Anderson Mesa	LONEOS	·	4.6 km	MPC · JPL
54508	2000 PD_{4}	—	August 1, 2000	Socorro	LINEAR	·	5.7 km	MPC · JPL
54509 YORP	2000 PH_{5}	YORP	August 3, 2000	Socorro	LINEAR	APO · critical · fast	100 m	MPC · JPL
54510 Yakagehonjin	2000 PD_{7}	Yakagehonjin	August 6, 2000	Bisei SG Center	BATTeRS	·	5.2 km	MPC · JPL
54511	2000 PX_{10}	—	August 1, 2000	Socorro	LINEAR	EOS	3.9 km	MPC · JPL
54512	2000 PO_{11}	—	August 1, 2000	Socorro	LINEAR	·	4.9 km	MPC · JPL
54513	2000 PS_{11}	—	August 1, 2000	Socorro	LINEAR	·	6.9 km	MPC · JPL
54514	2000 PA_{12}	—	August 1, 2000	Socorro	LINEAR	T_{j} (2.89)	15 km	MPC · JPL
54515	2000 PH_{19}	—	August 1, 2000	Socorro	LINEAR	EUN	3.7 km	MPC · JPL
54516	2000 PB_{20}	—	August 1, 2000	Socorro	LINEAR	·	12 km	MPC · JPL
54517	2000 PK_{21}	—	August 1, 2000	Socorro	LINEAR	EOS	3.6 km	MPC · JPL
54518	2000 PH_{28}	—	August 4, 2000	Haleakala	NEAT	·	11 km	MPC · JPL
54519	2000 PF_{29}	—	August 1, 2000	Socorro	LINEAR	GEF	2.9 km	MPC · JPL
54520	2000 PJ_{30}	—	August 5, 2000	Mauna Kea	M. J. Holman	centaur · critical	139 km	MPC · JPL
54521 Aladdin	2000 QD_{1}	Aladdin	August 23, 2000	Reedy Creek	J. Broughton	·	16 km	MPC · JPL
54522 Menaechmus	2000 QS_{1}	Menaechmus	August 23, 2000	Gnosca	S. Sposetti	EOS	4.7 km	MPC · JPL
54523	2000 QV_{2}	—	August 24, 2000	Socorro	LINEAR	·	7.9 km	MPC · JPL
54524	2000 QX_{2}	—	August 24, 2000	Socorro	LINEAR	·	4.6 km	MPC · JPL
54525	2000 QZ_{3}	—	August 24, 2000	Socorro	LINEAR	·	5.2 km	MPC · JPL
54526	2000 QS_{13}	—	August 24, 2000	Socorro	LINEAR	·	6.7 km	MPC · JPL
54527	2000 QJ_{16}	—	August 24, 2000	Socorro	LINEAR	KOR	3.4 km	MPC · JPL
54528	2000 QF_{18}	—	August 24, 2000	Socorro	LINEAR	·	2.8 km	MPC · JPL
54529	2000 QW_{20}	—	August 24, 2000	Socorro	LINEAR	·	5.6 km	MPC · JPL
54530	2000 QN_{26}	—	August 27, 2000	Reedy Creek	J. Broughton	·	3.2 km	MPC · JPL
54531	2000 QH_{33}	—	August 26, 2000	Socorro	LINEAR	EUN	3.9 km	MPC · JPL
54532	2000 QR_{35}	—	August 28, 2000	Višnjan Observatory	K. Korlević	NYS	2.6 km	MPC · JPL
54533	2000 QM_{38}	—	August 24, 2000	Socorro	LINEAR	CYB	8.0 km	MPC · JPL
54534	2000 QE_{39}	—	August 24, 2000	Socorro	LINEAR	HYG	7.2 km	MPC · JPL
54535	2000 QJ_{39}	—	August 24, 2000	Socorro	LINEAR	·	9.2 km	MPC · JPL
54536	2000 QD_{46}	—	August 24, 2000	Socorro	LINEAR	·	3.8 km	MPC · JPL
54537	2000 QD_{49}	—	August 24, 2000	Socorro	LINEAR	·	3.4 km	MPC · JPL
54538	2000 QC_{51}	—	August 24, 2000	Socorro	LINEAR	·	15 km	MPC · JPL
54539	2000 QR_{56}	—	August 26, 2000	Socorro	LINEAR	·	4.0 km	MPC · JPL
54540	2000 QQ_{58}	—	August 26, 2000	Socorro	LINEAR	EOS	4.1 km	MPC · JPL
54541	2000 QW_{58}	—	August 26, 2000	Socorro	LINEAR	·	3.9 km	MPC · JPL
54542	2000 QO_{59}	—	August 26, 2000	Socorro	LINEAR	·	1.9 km	MPC · JPL
54543	2000 QC_{60}	—	August 26, 2000	Socorro	LINEAR	EUN	4.0 km	MPC · JPL
54544	2000 QK_{62}	—	August 28, 2000	Socorro	LINEAR	·	14 km	MPC · JPL
54545	2000 QS_{64}	—	August 28, 2000	Socorro	LINEAR	·	11 km	MPC · JPL
54546	2000 QQ_{69}	—	August 30, 2000	Kitt Peak	Spacewatch	·	5.3 km	MPC · JPL
54547	2000 QO_{71}	—	August 24, 2000	Socorro	LINEAR	CYB	9.0 km	MPC · JPL
54548	2000 QO_{76}	—	August 24, 2000	Socorro	LINEAR	EOS	6.3 km	MPC · JPL
54549	2000 QX_{84}	—	August 25, 2000	Socorro	LINEAR	EOS	4.5 km	MPC · JPL
54550	2000 QA_{87}	—	August 25, 2000	Socorro	LINEAR	EOS	5.9 km	MPC · JPL
54551	2000 QX_{87}	—	August 25, 2000	Socorro	LINEAR	·	12 km	MPC · JPL
54552	2000 QO_{100}	—	August 28, 2000	Socorro	LINEAR	VER	8.3 km	MPC · JPL
54553	2000 QE_{103}	—	August 28, 2000	Socorro	LINEAR	GEF	3.5 km	MPC · JPL
54554	2000 QS_{105}	—	August 28, 2000	Socorro	LINEAR	·	8.2 km	MPC · JPL
54555	2000 QK_{112}	—	August 24, 2000	Socorro	LINEAR	EOS	5.5 km	MPC · JPL
54556	2000 QX_{116}	—	August 28, 2000	Socorro	LINEAR	EOS	8.3 km	MPC · JPL
54557	2000 QG_{119}	—	August 25, 2000	Socorro	LINEAR	·	8.2 km	MPC · JPL
54558	2000 QR_{125}	—	August 31, 2000	Socorro	LINEAR	EOS	5.0 km	MPC · JPL
54559	2000 QR_{128}	—	August 25, 2000	Socorro	LINEAR	·	9.6 km	MPC · JPL
54560	2000 QM_{132}	—	August 26, 2000	Socorro	LINEAR	·	8.0 km	MPC · JPL
54561	2000 QH_{135}	—	August 26, 2000	Socorro	LINEAR	·	6.9 km	MPC · JPL
54562	2000 QU_{140}	—	August 31, 2000	Socorro	LINEAR	·	13 km	MPC · JPL
54563 Kinokonasu	2000 QJ_{147}	Kinokonasu	August 31, 2000	Goodricke-Pigott	R. A. Tucker	·	12 km	MPC · JPL
54564 Kiyoshiizumi	2000 QZ_{148}	Kiyoshiizumi	August 30, 2000	Bisei SG Center	BATTeRS	·	5.6 km	MPC · JPL
54565	2000 QK_{149}	—	August 24, 2000	Socorro	LINEAR	·	11 km	MPC · JPL
54566	2000 QW_{151}	—	August 26, 2000	Socorro	LINEAR	·	5.5 km	MPC · JPL
54567	2000 QZ_{151}	—	August 26, 2000	Socorro	LINEAR	CYB	9.6 km	MPC · JPL
54568	2000 QO_{152}	—	August 29, 2000	Socorro	LINEAR	·	5.9 km	MPC · JPL
54569	2000 QV_{152}	—	August 29, 2000	Socorro	LINEAR	(1298)	7.0 km	MPC · JPL
54570	2000 QB_{154}	—	August 31, 2000	Socorro	LINEAR	·	5.8 km	MPC · JPL
54571	2000 QG_{155}	—	August 31, 2000	Socorro	LINEAR	·	9.0 km	MPC · JPL
54572	2000 QL_{155}	—	August 31, 2000	Socorro	LINEAR	VER	7.2 km	MPC · JPL
54573	2000 QP_{155}	—	August 31, 2000	Socorro	LINEAR	·	5.8 km	MPC · JPL
54574	2000 QL_{157}	—	August 31, 2000	Socorro	LINEAR	EOS	5.2 km	MPC · JPL
54575	2000 QY_{157}	—	August 31, 2000	Socorro	LINEAR	slow	7.7 km	MPC · JPL
54576	2000 QE_{159}	—	August 31, 2000	Socorro	LINEAR	EMA	9.9 km	MPC · JPL
54577	2000 QA_{160}	—	August 31, 2000	Socorro	LINEAR	·	6.3 km	MPC · JPL
54578	2000 QK_{161}	—	August 31, 2000	Socorro	LINEAR	·	6.9 km	MPC · JPL
54579	2000 QA_{165}	—	August 31, 2000	Socorro	LINEAR	·	4.6 km	MPC · JPL
54580	2000 QE_{168}	—	August 31, 2000	Socorro	LINEAR	·	4.0 km	MPC · JPL
54581	2000 QW_{170}	—	August 31, 2000	Socorro	LINEAR	L5	14 km	MPC · JPL
54582	2000 QU_{179}	—	August 31, 2000	Socorro	LINEAR	L5	17 km	MPC · JPL
54583	2000 QT_{180}	—	August 31, 2000	Socorro	LINEAR	V	2.4 km	MPC · JPL
54584	2000 QC_{181}	—	August 31, 2000	Socorro	LINEAR	·	3.2 km	MPC · JPL
54585	2000 QJ_{187}	—	August 26, 2000	Socorro	LINEAR	·	4.4 km	MPC · JPL
54586	2000 QV_{188}	—	August 26, 2000	Socorro	LINEAR	·	6.8 km	MPC · JPL
54587	2000 QM_{189}	—	August 26, 2000	Socorro	LINEAR	·	4.4 km	MPC · JPL
54588	2000 QE_{192}	—	August 26, 2000	Socorro	LINEAR	·	9.3 km	MPC · JPL
54589	2000 QF_{195}	—	August 26, 2000	Socorro	LINEAR	·	3.4 km	MPC · JPL
54590	2000 QA_{202}	—	August 29, 2000	Socorro	LINEAR	·	7.3 km	MPC · JPL
54591	2000 QC_{202}	—	August 29, 2000	Socorro	LINEAR	·	3.4 km	MPC · JPL
54592	2000 QA_{216}	—	August 31, 2000	Socorro	LINEAR	VER	6.9 km	MPC · JPL
54593	2000 QR_{219}	—	August 20, 2000	Anderson Mesa	LONEOS	ADE	4.8 km	MPC · JPL
54594	2000 QZ_{220}	—	August 21, 2000	Anderson Mesa	LONEOS	AGN	2.6 km	MPC · JPL
54595	2000 QZ_{222}	—	August 21, 2000	Anderson Mesa	LONEOS	·	4.9 km	MPC · JPL
54596	2000 QD_{225}	—	August 29, 2000	Socorro	LINEAR	L5	18 km	MPC · JPL
54597	2000 QZ_{229}	—	August 31, 2000	Socorro	LINEAR	V	1.5 km	MPC · JPL
54598 Bienor	2000 QC_{243}	Bienor	August 27, 2000	Cerro Tololo	Deep Ecliptic Survey	centaur	188 km	MPC · JPL
54599	2000 QN_{244}	—	August 24, 2000	Socorro	LINEAR	3:2	6.9 km	MPC · JPL
54600	2000 RU_{8}	—	September 1, 2000	Socorro	LINEAR	V	2.8 km	MPC · JPL

== 54601–54700 ==
back to top

Designation			Discovery			Properties		Ref
Permanent	Provisional	Named after	Date	Site	Discoverer(s)	Category	Diam.	Ref
54601	2000 RZ_{13}	—	September 1, 2000	Socorro	LINEAR	·	8.1 km	MPC · JPL
54602	2000 RB_{15}	—	September 1, 2000	Socorro	LINEAR	·	5.5 km	MPC · JPL
54603	2000 RF_{16}	—	September 1, 2000	Socorro	LINEAR	·	10 km	MPC · JPL
54604	2000 RG_{18}	—	September 1, 2000	Socorro	LINEAR	·	8.2 km	MPC · JPL
54605	2000 RP_{26}	—	September 1, 2000	Socorro	LINEAR	·	4.7 km	MPC · JPL
54606	2000 RA_{28}	—	September 1, 2000	Socorro	LINEAR	EOS	7.1 km	MPC · JPL
54607	2000 RX_{28}	—	September 1, 2000	Socorro	LINEAR	·	6.1 km	MPC · JPL
54608	2000 RH_{33}	—	September 1, 2000	Socorro	LINEAR	·	7.3 km	MPC · JPL
54609	2000 RN_{36}	—	September 4, 2000	Prescott	P. G. Comba	·	9.3 km	MPC · JPL
54610 Toichisakata	2000 RG_{52}	Toichisakata	September 6, 2000	Bisei SG Center	BATTeRS	·	7.1 km	MPC · JPL
54611	2000 RO_{63}	—	September 3, 2000	Socorro	LINEAR	GEF	3.5 km	MPC · JPL
54612	2000 RA_{68}	—	September 2, 2000	Socorro	LINEAR	·	5.7 km	MPC · JPL
54613	2000 RD_{80}	—	September 1, 2000	Socorro	LINEAR	·	12 km	MPC · JPL
54614	2000 RL_{84}	—	September 2, 2000	Anderson Mesa	LONEOS	L5	10 km	MPC · JPL
54615	2000 RF_{87}	—	September 2, 2000	Anderson Mesa	LONEOS	·	3.9 km	MPC · JPL
54616	2000 RZ_{97}	—	September 5, 2000	Anderson Mesa	LONEOS	·	10 km	MPC · JPL
54617	2000 RS_{98}	—	September 5, 2000	Anderson Mesa	LONEOS	·	8.8 km	MPC · JPL
54618	2000 RB_{102}	—	September 5, 2000	Anderson Mesa	LONEOS	·	10 km	MPC · JPL
54619	2000 SS_{3}	—	September 20, 2000	Socorro	LINEAR	·	5.2 km	MPC · JPL
54620	2000 ST_{8}	—	September 23, 2000	Prescott	P. G. Comba	·	12 km	MPC · JPL
54621	2000 SS_{12}	—	September 20, 2000	Socorro	LINEAR	·	4.4 km	MPC · JPL
54622	2000 SH_{31}	—	September 24, 2000	Socorro	LINEAR	CYB	9.3 km	MPC · JPL
54623	2000 SR_{34}	—	September 24, 2000	Socorro	LINEAR	VER	8.5 km	MPC · JPL
54624	2000 SH_{45}	—	September 22, 2000	Socorro	LINEAR	URS	13 km	MPC · JPL
54625	2000 SC_{49}	—	September 23, 2000	Socorro	LINEAR	L5	20 km	MPC · JPL
54626	2000 SJ_{49}	—	September 23, 2000	Socorro	LINEAR	L5	20 km	MPC · JPL
54627	2000 SN_{72}	—	September 24, 2000	Socorro	LINEAR	·	2.1 km	MPC · JPL
54628	2000 SB_{81}	—	September 24, 2000	Socorro	LINEAR	3:2	14 km	MPC · JPL
54629	2000 SL_{98}	—	September 23, 2000	Socorro	LINEAR	URS	12 km	MPC · JPL
54630	2000 SM_{112}	—	September 24, 2000	Socorro	LINEAR	HIL · 3:2	16 km	MPC · JPL
54631	2000 SJ_{115}	—	September 24, 2000	Socorro	LINEAR	3:2	17 km	MPC · JPL
54632	2000 SD_{130}	—	September 22, 2000	Socorro	LINEAR	L5	20 km	MPC · JPL
54633	2000 SL_{130}	—	September 22, 2000	Socorro	LINEAR	·	7.5 km	MPC · JPL
54634	2000 SA_{132}	—	September 22, 2000	Socorro	LINEAR	L5	20 km	MPC · JPL
54635	2000 SE_{132}	—	September 22, 2000	Socorro	LINEAR	·	12 km	MPC · JPL
54636	2000 SX_{140}	—	September 23, 2000	Socorro	LINEAR	·	5.8 km	MPC · JPL
54637	2000 SL_{141}	—	September 23, 2000	Socorro	LINEAR	slow	11 km	MPC · JPL
54638	2000 SC_{144}	—	September 24, 2000	Socorro	LINEAR	L5	15 km	MPC · JPL
54639	2000 SR_{184}	—	September 20, 2000	Haleakala	NEAT	·	5.1 km	MPC · JPL
54640	2000 SK_{189}	—	September 22, 2000	Haleakala	NEAT	·	9.1 km	MPC · JPL
54641	2000 SA_{242}	—	September 24, 2000	Socorro	LINEAR	·	7.2 km	MPC · JPL
54642	2000 SH_{243}	—	September 24, 2000	Socorro	LINEAR	VER	4.2 km	MPC · JPL
54643	2000 SP_{283}	—	September 23, 2000	Socorro	LINEAR	L5	19 km	MPC · JPL
54644	2000 SN_{284}	—	September 23, 2000	Socorro	LINEAR	HIL · 3:2	12 km	MPC · JPL
54645	2000 SR_{284}	—	September 23, 2000	Socorro	LINEAR	L5	20 km	MPC · JPL
54646	2000 SS_{291}	—	September 27, 2000	Socorro	LINEAR	L5	17 km	MPC · JPL
54647	2000 ST_{304}	—	September 30, 2000	Socorro	LINEAR	THB	9.6 km	MPC · JPL
54648	2000 SL_{307}	—	September 30, 2000	Socorro	LINEAR	·	12 km	MPC · JPL
54649	2000 SE_{310}	—	September 26, 2000	Socorro	LINEAR	L5	21 km	MPC · JPL
54650	2000 SE_{315}	—	September 28, 2000	Socorro	LINEAR	·	15 km	MPC · JPL
54651	2000 SF_{327}	—	September 29, 2000	Haleakala	NEAT	URS	9.8 km	MPC · JPL
54652	2000 SZ_{344}	—	September 20, 2000	Socorro	LINEAR	L5	16 km	MPC · JPL
54653	2000 SB_{350}	—	September 29, 2000	Anderson Mesa	LONEOS	L5	20 km	MPC · JPL
54654	2000 SW_{355}	—	September 29, 2000	Anderson Mesa	LONEOS	TIR	7.0 km	MPC · JPL
54655	2000 SQ_{362}	—	September 20, 2000	Socorro	LINEAR	L5	19 km	MPC · JPL
54656	2000 SX_{362}	—	September 20, 2000	Socorro	LINEAR	L5	38 km	MPC · JPL
54657	2000 SA_{366}	—	September 23, 2000	Anderson Mesa	LONEOS	3:2	12 km	MPC · JPL
54658	2000 TN_{39}	—	October 1, 2000	Socorro	LINEAR	EOS	6.8 km	MPC · JPL
54659	2000 TM_{51}	—	October 1, 2000	Socorro	LINEAR	·	5.1 km	MPC · JPL
54660	2000 UJ_{1}	—	October 19, 2000	Socorro	LINEAR	AMO +1km	930 m	MPC · JPL
54661	2000 UY_{18}	—	October 25, 2000	Socorro	LINEAR	·	2.8 km	MPC · JPL
54662	2000 UY_{80}	—	October 24, 2000	Socorro	LINEAR	·	2.9 km	MPC · JPL
54663	2000 UT_{82}	—	October 30, 2000	Socorro	LINEAR	slow	5.9 km	MPC · JPL
54664	2000 UH_{107}	—	October 30, 2000	Socorro	LINEAR	V	1.5 km	MPC · JPL
54665	2000 UL_{110}	—	October 31, 2000	Socorro	LINEAR	·	13 km	MPC · JPL
54666	2000 WJ_{6}	—	November 20, 2000	Farpoint	Farpoint	·	2.3 km	MPC · JPL
54667	2000 WJ_{36}	—	November 20, 2000	Socorro	LINEAR	V	1.8 km	MPC · JPL
54668	2000 WO_{85}	—	November 20, 2000	Socorro	LINEAR	·	2.8 km	MPC · JPL
54669	2000 WB_{89}	—	November 21, 2000	Socorro	LINEAR	·	4.6 km	MPC · JPL
54670	2000 WW_{92}	—	November 21, 2000	Socorro	LINEAR	·	1.9 km	MPC · JPL
54671	2000 WW_{102}	—	November 26, 2000	Socorro	LINEAR	·	7.5 km	MPC · JPL
54672	2000 WO_{180}	—	November 28, 2000	Haleakala	NEAT	L5	23 km	MPC · JPL
54673	2000 WS_{189}	—	November 18, 2000	Anderson Mesa	LONEOS	·	8.0 km	MPC · JPL
54674	2000 XN_{4}	—	December 1, 2000	Socorro	LINEAR	EUP	13 km	MPC · JPL
54675	2000 XZ_{25}	—	December 4, 2000	Socorro	LINEAR	·	4.5 km	MPC · JPL
54676	2000 YP_{12}	—	December 25, 2000	Ametlla de Mar	J. Nomen	·	3.2 km	MPC · JPL
54677	2000 YD_{40}	—	December 30, 2000	Socorro	LINEAR	(17392)	3.5 km	MPC · JPL
54678	2000 YW_{47}	—	December 30, 2000	Socorro	LINEAR	L4	20 km	MPC · JPL
54679	2000 YF_{113}	—	December 30, 2000	Socorro	LINEAR	·	1.8 km	MPC · JPL
54680	2001 AS_{9}	—	January 2, 2001	Socorro	LINEAR	L4	20 km	MPC · JPL
54681	2001 AE_{49}	—	January 15, 2001	Socorro	LINEAR	·	2.9 km	MPC · JPL
54682	2001 BU_{8}	—	January 19, 2001	Socorro	LINEAR	·	5.7 km	MPC · JPL
54683	2001 CJ_{20}	—	February 2, 2001	Socorro	LINEAR	H	1.6 km	MPC · JPL
54684	2001 CS_{20}	—	February 3, 2001	Socorro	LINEAR	H	1.5 km	MPC · JPL
54685	2001 CT_{33}	—	February 13, 2001	Socorro	LINEAR	EUN	3.7 km	MPC · JPL
54686	2001 DU_{8}	—	February 17, 2001	Socorro	LINEAR	AMO +1km	1.3 km	MPC · JPL
54687	2001 DC_{15}	—	February 17, 2001	Črni Vrh	Matičič, S.	PHO	3.8 km	MPC · JPL
54688	2001 DZ_{69}	—	February 19, 2001	Socorro	LINEAR	·	2.7 km	MPC · JPL
54689	2001 DH_{101}	—	February 16, 2001	Socorro	LINEAR	L4	20 km	MPC · JPL
54690	2001 EB	—	March 1, 2001	Socorro	LINEAR	AMO +1km	1.1 km	MPC · JPL
54691	2001 EL_{6}	—	March 2, 2001	Anderson Mesa	LONEOS	·	5.0 km	MPC · JPL
54692	2001 EJ_{10}	—	March 2, 2001	Anderson Mesa	LONEOS	·	2.1 km	MPC · JPL
54693 Garymyers	2001 FM_{6}	Garymyers	March 19, 2001	Junk Bond	D. Healy	·	2.9 km	MPC · JPL
54694	2001 FJ_{54}	—	March 18, 2001	Socorro	LINEAR	·	2.1 km	MPC · JPL
54695	2001 FM_{54}	—	March 18, 2001	Socorro	LINEAR	·	2.7 km	MPC · JPL
54696	2001 FO_{69}	—	March 19, 2001	Socorro	LINEAR	·	1.9 km	MPC · JPL
54697	2001 FA_{70}	—	March 19, 2001	Socorro	LINEAR	moon	4.2 km	MPC · JPL
54698	2001 FF_{70}	—	March 19, 2001	Socorro	LINEAR	·	2.3 km	MPC · JPL
54699	2001 FP_{137}	—	March 21, 2001	Anderson Mesa	LONEOS	·	2.9 km	MPC · JPL
54700	2001 FE_{143}	—	March 23, 2001	Anderson Mesa	LONEOS	·	2.3 km	MPC · JPL

== 54701–54800 ==
back to top

Designation			Discovery			Properties		Ref
Permanent	Provisional	Named after	Date	Site	Discoverer(s)	Category	Diam.	Ref
54701	2001 FY_{150}	—	March 24, 2001	Anderson Mesa	LONEOS	(2076)	1.5 km	MPC · JPL
54702	2001 FO_{159}	—	March 29, 2001	Anderson Mesa	LONEOS	·	1.7 km	MPC · JPL
54703	2001 FE_{160}	—	March 29, 2001	Anderson Mesa	LONEOS	·	3.0 km	MPC · JPL
54704	2001 FC_{172}	—	March 24, 2001	Haleakala	NEAT	·	4.6 km	MPC · JPL
54705	2001 GW_{3}	—	April 15, 2001	Haleakala	NEAT	BAP	2.7 km	MPC · JPL
54706	2001 HG_{1}	—	April 17, 2001	Socorro	LINEAR	·	1.7 km	MPC · JPL
54707	2001 HL_{6}	—	April 18, 2001	Socorro	LINEAR	PHO	5.2 km	MPC · JPL
54708	2001 HH_{18}	—	April 21, 2001	Socorro	LINEAR	H	1.4 km	MPC · JPL
54709	2001 HS_{20}	—	April 21, 2001	Socorro	LINEAR	·	2.1 km	MPC · JPL
54710	2001 HT_{20}	—	April 21, 2001	Socorro	LINEAR	NYS	2.8 km	MPC · JPL
54711	2001 HJ_{23}	—	April 21, 2001	Kitt Peak	Spacewatch	NYS	2.3 km	MPC · JPL
54712	2001 HD_{30}	—	April 27, 2001	Socorro	LINEAR	·	3.5 km	MPC · JPL
54713	2001 HK_{37}	—	April 29, 2001	Socorro	LINEAR	·	3.6 km	MPC · JPL
54714	2001 HB_{38}	—	April 26, 2001	Desert Beaver	W. K. Y. Yeung	V	1.7 km	MPC · JPL
54715	2001 HM_{44}	—	April 16, 2001	Anderson Mesa	LONEOS	·	1.8 km	MPC · JPL
54716	2001 HK_{48}	—	April 21, 2001	Socorro	LINEAR	EUN	3.7 km	MPC · JPL
54717	2001 HQ_{60}	—	April 24, 2001	Anderson Mesa	LONEOS	·	4.8 km	MPC · JPL
54718	2001 HB_{61}	—	April 24, 2001	Anderson Mesa	LONEOS	·	2.9 km	MPC · JPL
54719	2001 HS_{67}	—	April 26, 2001	Anderson Mesa	LONEOS	·	1.9 km	MPC · JPL
54720 Kentstevens	2001 JY_{2}	Kentstevens	May 15, 2001	Badlands	Dyvig, R.	·	1.7 km	MPC · JPL
54721	2001 JX_{3}	—	May 15, 2001	Haleakala	NEAT	·	1.9 km	MPC · JPL
54722	2001 JD_{10}	—	May 15, 2001	Haleakala	NEAT	NYS	5.3 km	MPC · JPL
54723	2001 KW_{1}	—	May 16, 2001	Haleakala	NEAT	·	6.7 km	MPC · JPL
54724	2001 KM_{4}	—	May 17, 2001	Socorro	LINEAR	NYS	2.8 km	MPC · JPL
54725	2001 KT_{5}	—	May 17, 2001	Socorro	LINEAR	·	1.8 km	MPC · JPL
54726	2001 KU_{9}	—	May 18, 2001	Socorro	LINEAR	·	3.5 km	MPC · JPL
54727	2001 KO_{10}	—	May 18, 2001	Socorro	LINEAR	·	2.8 km	MPC · JPL
54728	2001 KP_{11}	—	May 18, 2001	Socorro	LINEAR	·	3.1 km	MPC · JPL
54729	2001 KQ_{13}	—	May 18, 2001	Socorro	LINEAR	(5)	3.9 km	MPC · JPL
54730	2001 KR_{13}	—	May 18, 2001	Socorro	LINEAR	·	8.9 km	MPC · JPL
54731	2001 KJ_{15}	—	May 18, 2001	Socorro	LINEAR	·	1.7 km	MPC · JPL
54732	2001 KH_{19}	—	May 21, 2001	Socorro	LINEAR	·	2.1 km	MPC · JPL
54733	2001 KP_{19}	—	May 21, 2001	Socorro	LINEAR	·	4.9 km	MPC · JPL
54734	2001 KF_{20}	—	May 23, 2001	Desert Beaver	W. K. Y. Yeung	·	3.8 km	MPC · JPL
54735	2001 KW_{24}	—	May 17, 2001	Socorro	LINEAR	·	1.7 km	MPC · JPL
54736	2001 KC_{26}	—	May 17, 2001	Socorro	LINEAR	·	2.5 km	MPC · JPL
54737	2001 KM_{27}	—	May 17, 2001	Socorro	LINEAR	·	4.1 km	MPC · JPL
54738	2001 KZ_{27}	—	May 17, 2001	Socorro	LINEAR	·	1.9 km	MPC · JPL
54739	2001 KC_{31}	—	May 21, 2001	Socorro	LINEAR	·	4.2 km	MPC · JPL
54740	2001 KN_{31}	—	May 22, 2001	Socorro	LINEAR	PHO	4.7 km	MPC · JPL
54741	2001 KT_{31}	—	May 22, 2001	Socorro	LINEAR	V	1.4 km	MPC · JPL
54742	2001 KS_{34}	—	May 18, 2001	Socorro	LINEAR	·	4.0 km	MPC · JPL
54743	2001 KQ_{36}	—	May 21, 2001	Socorro	LINEAR	·	1.9 km	MPC · JPL
54744	2001 KK_{37}	—	May 21, 2001	Socorro	LINEAR	·	6.7 km	MPC · JPL
54745	2001 KS_{38}	—	May 22, 2001	Socorro	LINEAR	(5)	5.4 km	MPC · JPL
54746	2001 KE_{39}	—	May 22, 2001	Socorro	LINEAR	·	4.8 km	MPC · JPL
54747	2001 KB_{42}	—	May 21, 2001	Kitt Peak	Spacewatch	V	1.7 km	MPC · JPL
54748	2001 KO_{44}	—	May 22, 2001	Socorro	LINEAR	EUN	3.0 km	MPC · JPL
54749	2001 KR_{45}	—	May 22, 2001	Socorro	LINEAR	·	2.7 km	MPC · JPL
54750	2001 KW_{45}	—	May 22, 2001	Socorro	LINEAR	·	11 km	MPC · JPL
54751	2001 KO_{46}	—	May 22, 2001	Socorro	LINEAR	·	2.8 km	MPC · JPL
54752	2001 KL_{48}	—	May 24, 2001	Socorro	LINEAR	V	1.5 km	MPC · JPL
54753	2001 KZ_{48}	—	May 24, 2001	Socorro	LINEAR	·	2.2 km	MPC · JPL
54754	2001 KJ_{56}	—	May 22, 2001	Socorro	LINEAR	·	3.7 km	MPC · JPL
54755	2001 KZ_{56}	—	May 23, 2001	Socorro	LINEAR	slow	3.9 km	MPC · JPL
54756	2001 KJ_{58}	—	May 26, 2001	Socorro	LINEAR	EOS	4.9 km	MPC · JPL
54757	2001 KY_{58}	—	May 26, 2001	Socorro	LINEAR	·	2.7 km	MPC · JPL
54758	2001 KP_{59}	—	May 26, 2001	Socorro	LINEAR	·	4.6 km	MPC · JPL
54759	2001 KA_{60}	—	May 26, 2001	Socorro	LINEAR	EUN	3.8 km	MPC · JPL
54760	2001 KD_{60}	—	May 26, 2001	Socorro	LINEAR	·	5.9 km	MPC · JPL
54761	2001 KJ_{66}	—	May 22, 2001	Socorro	LINEAR	NYS	2.6 km	MPC · JPL
54762	2001 KL_{73}	—	May 24, 2001	Anderson Mesa	LONEOS	EUN	2.9 km	MPC · JPL
54763	2001 KQ_{75}	—	May 29, 2001	Socorro	LINEAR	·	3.1 km	MPC · JPL
54764	2001 LB_{4}	—	June 13, 2001	Socorro	LINEAR	·	2.2 km	MPC · JPL
54765	2001 LB_{5}	—	June 15, 2001	Palomar	NEAT	·	3.5 km	MPC · JPL
54766	2001 LT_{5}	—	June 14, 2001	Palomar	NEAT	MAS	2.1 km	MPC · JPL
54767	2001 LW_{6}	—	June 15, 2001	Palomar	NEAT	V	2.2 km	MPC · JPL
54768	2001 LA_{8}	—	June 15, 2001	Palomar	NEAT	GEF	2.9 km	MPC · JPL
54769	2001 LJ_{8}	—	June 15, 2001	Palomar	NEAT	·	3.8 km	MPC · JPL
54770	2001 LS_{10}	—	June 15, 2001	Socorro	LINEAR	·	2.4 km	MPC · JPL
54771	2001 LJ_{12}	—	June 15, 2001	Socorro	LINEAR	·	3.0 km	MPC · JPL
54772	2001 LN_{12}	—	June 15, 2001	Socorro	LINEAR	·	2.5 km	MPC · JPL
54773	2001 LP_{12}	—	June 15, 2001	Socorro	LINEAR	PHO	2.4 km	MPC · JPL
54774	2001 LY_{14}	—	June 15, 2001	Palomar	NEAT	·	3.6 km	MPC · JPL
54775	2001 LK_{16}	—	June 14, 2001	Palomar	NEAT	·	3.1 km	MPC · JPL
54776	2001 LL_{16}	—	June 14, 2001	Palomar	NEAT	·	4.4 km	MPC · JPL
54777	2001 LF_{17}	—	June 15, 2001	Kitt Peak	Spacewatch	·	2.5 km	MPC · JPL
54778	2001 LP_{17}	—	June 15, 2001	Socorro	LINEAR	·	2.6 km	MPC · JPL
54779	2001 LS_{17}	—	June 15, 2001	Palomar	NEAT	V	2.4 km	MPC · JPL
54780	2001 LW_{18}	—	June 15, 2001	Socorro	LINEAR	·	2.0 km	MPC · JPL
54781	2001 LA_{19}	—	June 15, 2001	Socorro	LINEAR	·	2.3 km	MPC · JPL
54782	2001 LJ_{19}	—	June 15, 2001	Socorro	LINEAR	DOR	7.3 km	MPC · JPL
54783	2001 MM_{1}	—	June 17, 2001	Palomar	NEAT	NYS	2.7 km	MPC · JPL
54784	2001 MW_{3}	—	June 16, 2001	Socorro	LINEAR	·	3.7 km	MPC · JPL
54785	2001 MZ_{3}	—	June 16, 2001	Socorro	LINEAR	V	1.5 km	MPC · JPL
54786	2001 MJ_{4}	—	June 16, 2001	Haleakala	NEAT	·	1.7 km	MPC · JPL
54787	2001 MO_{5}	—	June 16, 2001	Palomar	NEAT	·	3.7 km	MPC · JPL
54788	2001 MZ_{6}	—	June 20, 2001	Socorro	LINEAR	PHO	2.4 km	MPC · JPL
54789	2001 MZ_{7}	—	June 21, 2001	Socorro	LINEAR	AMO +1km	1.6 km	MPC · JPL
54790	2001 MT_{8}	—	June 16, 2001	Haleakala	NEAT	EUN	3.4 km	MPC · JPL
54791	2001 ME_{9}	—	June 21, 2001	Palomar	NEAT	EUN	3.4 km	MPC · JPL
54792	2001 MJ_{9}	—	June 21, 2001	Palomar	NEAT	·	7.8 km	MPC · JPL
54793	2001 MD_{10}	—	June 24, 2001	Desert Beaver	W. K. Y. Yeung	·	3.8 km	MPC · JPL
54794	2001 MN_{10}	—	June 20, 2001	Palomar	NEAT	·	3.7 km	MPC · JPL
54795	2001 MV_{10}	—	June 21, 2001	Palomar	NEAT	·	2.5 km	MPC · JPL
54796	2001 MW_{10}	—	June 21, 2001	Palomar	NEAT	·	5.1 km	MPC · JPL
54797	2001 MR_{12}	—	June 22, 2001	Palomar	NEAT	·	3.9 km	MPC · JPL
54798	2001 ME_{14}	—	June 23, 2001	Palomar	NEAT	·	8.3 km	MPC · JPL
54799	2001 MR_{14}	—	June 28, 2001	Anderson Mesa	LONEOS	·	7.7 km	MPC · JPL
54800	2001 MC_{15}	—	June 28, 2001	Anderson Mesa	LONEOS	·	3.7 km	MPC · JPL

== 54801–54900 ==
back to top

Designation			Discovery			Properties		Ref
Permanent	Provisional	Named after	Date	Site	Discoverer(s)	Category	Diam.	Ref
54801	2001 MT_{17}	—	June 24, 2001	Farpoint	G. Hug	·	2.5 km	MPC · JPL
54802	2001 ME_{19}	—	June 30, 2001	Anderson Mesa	LONEOS	·	7.8 km	MPC · JPL
54803	2001 MK_{19}	—	June 21, 2001	Palomar	NEAT	·	3.1 km	MPC · JPL
54804	2001 MT_{21}	—	June 28, 2001	Palomar	NEAT	·	2.2 km	MPC · JPL
54805	2001 MW_{22}	—	June 30, 2001	Palomar	NEAT	·	8.2 km	MPC · JPL
54806	2001 MX_{22}	—	June 30, 2001	Palomar	NEAT	(5931)	9.4 km	MPC · JPL
54807	2001 MZ_{23}	—	June 27, 2001	Haleakala	NEAT	PHO	6.1 km	MPC · JPL
54808	2001 ME_{24}	—	June 27, 2001	Haleakala	NEAT	EUP	23 km	MPC · JPL
54809	2001 MN_{24}	—	June 16, 2001	Palomar	NEAT	·	3.0 km	MPC · JPL
54810 Molleigh	2001 MS_{24}	Molleigh	June 16, 2001	Anderson Mesa	LONEOS	·	3.7 km	MPC · JPL
54811	2001 MJ_{26}	—	June 19, 2001	Haleakala	NEAT	·	1.9 km	MPC · JPL
54812	2001 MQ_{26}	—	June 19, 2001	Haleakala	NEAT	·	2.8 km	MPC · JPL
54813	2001 MV_{27}	—	June 21, 2001	Palomar	NEAT	·	1.1 km	MPC · JPL
54814	2001 MK_{28}	—	June 25, 2001	Palomar	NEAT	·	2.1 km	MPC · JPL
54815	2001 MS_{28}	—	June 27, 2001	Anderson Mesa	LONEOS	·	3.0 km	MPC · JPL
54816	2001 MC_{30}	—	June 29, 2001	Kitt Peak	Spacewatch	·	5.9 km	MPC · JPL
54817	2001 NB	—	July 2, 2001	Palomar	NEAT	slow	9.7 km	MPC · JPL
54818	2001 NR	—	July 12, 2001	Reedy Creek	J. Broughton	fast	3.0 km	MPC · JPL
54819	2001 NA_{1}	—	July 12, 2001	Palomar	NEAT	·	3.0 km	MPC · JPL
54820 Svenders	2001 NV_{1}	Svenders	July 11, 2001	Needville	J. Dellinger, Dillon, W. G.	·	4.0 km	MPC · JPL
54821	2001 NB_{2}	—	July 13, 2001	Reedy Creek	J. Broughton	·	2.6 km	MPC · JPL
54822	2001 NQ_{2}	—	July 13, 2001	Palomar	NEAT	·	8.3 km	MPC · JPL
54823	2001 NN_{3}	—	July 13, 2001	Palomar	NEAT	NYS	2.7 km	MPC · JPL
54824	2001 NJ_{5}	—	July 13, 2001	Palomar	NEAT	·	2.3 km	MPC · JPL
54825	2001 NE_{7}	—	July 15, 2001	Haleakala	NEAT	CYB	9.1 km	MPC · JPL
54826	2001 NV_{7}	—	July 13, 2001	Haleakala	NEAT	·	3.6 km	MPC · JPL
54827 Kurpfalz	2001 NQ_{8}	Kurpfalz	July 14, 2001	Palomar	NEAT	NYS	2.1 km	MPC · JPL
54828	2001 NJ_{9}	—	July 13, 2001	Palomar	NEAT	·	2.7 km	MPC · JPL
54829	2001 NF_{10}	—	July 14, 2001	Palomar	NEAT	EUN	2.6 km	MPC · JPL
54830	2001 NC_{11}	—	July 14, 2001	Haleakala	NEAT	·	4.9 km	MPC · JPL
54831	2001 NE_{11}	—	July 14, 2001	Haleakala	NEAT	V	1.3 km	MPC · JPL
54832	2001 NL_{12}	—	July 13, 2001	Haleakala	NEAT	·	2.9 km	MPC · JPL
54833	2001 NW_{12}	—	July 14, 2001	Palomar	NEAT	·	2.5 km	MPC · JPL
54834	2001 NH_{18}	—	July 12, 2001	Palomar	NEAT	EUN	2.7 km	MPC · JPL
54835	2001 NU_{18}	—	July 12, 2001	Haleakala	NEAT	·	3.7 km	MPC · JPL
54836	2001 NA_{20}	—	July 12, 2001	Socorro	LINEAR	·	1.9 km	MPC · JPL
54837	2001 NK_{20}	—	July 13, 2001	Palomar	NEAT	·	8.9 km	MPC · JPL
54838	2001 NO_{21}	—	July 14, 2001	Palomar	NEAT	·	4.7 km	MPC · JPL
54839	2001 NQ_{21}	—	July 14, 2001	Palomar	NEAT	GEF	5.1 km	MPC · JPL
54840	2001 OE	—	July 16, 2001	Anderson Mesa	LONEOS	·	7.5 km	MPC · JPL
54841	2001 OD_{2}	—	July 18, 2001	Palomar	NEAT	V	1.3 km	MPC · JPL
54842	2001 OF_{2}	—	July 16, 2001	Anderson Mesa	LONEOS	·	9.7 km	MPC · JPL
54843	2001 OX_{2}	—	July 19, 2001	Reedy Creek	J. Broughton	THM	5.3 km	MPC · JPL
54844	2001 OY_{2}	—	July 19, 2001	Reedy Creek	J. Broughton	EOS	4.8 km	MPC · JPL
54845	2001 OF_{3}	—	July 19, 2001	Desert Beaver	W. K. Y. Yeung	V	2.8 km	MPC · JPL
54846	2001 OJ_{5}	—	July 17, 2001	Anderson Mesa	LONEOS	EUN	4.1 km	MPC · JPL
54847	2001 OM_{5}	—	July 17, 2001	Anderson Mesa	LONEOS	EUN	5.1 km	MPC · JPL
54848	2001 OC_{8}	—	July 17, 2001	Anderson Mesa	LONEOS	·	7.2 km	MPC · JPL
54849	2001 OM_{8}	—	July 17, 2001	Anderson Mesa	LONEOS	NYS	6.0 km	MPC · JPL
54850	2001 OZ_{11}	—	July 19, 2001	Palomar	NEAT	·	10 km	MPC · JPL
54851	2001 OA_{15}	—	July 18, 2001	Palomar	NEAT	·	4.1 km	MPC · JPL
54852 Mercatali	2001 OZ_{16}	Mercatali	July 22, 2001	San Marcello	L. Tesi, M. Tombelli	·	1.3 km	MPC · JPL
54853	2001 OQ_{19}	—	July 18, 2001	Haleakala	NEAT	MAS	2.7 km	MPC · JPL
54854	2001 OU_{20}	—	July 21, 2001	Anderson Mesa	LONEOS	·	14 km	MPC · JPL
54855	2001 OA_{21}	—	July 21, 2001	Anderson Mesa	LONEOS	·	9.6 km	MPC · JPL
54856	2001 OF_{21}	—	July 21, 2001	Anderson Mesa	LONEOS	HOF	9.6 km	MPC · JPL
54857	2001 OY_{22}	—	July 19, 2001	Palomar	NEAT	·	3.7 km	MPC · JPL
54858	2001 OE_{24}	—	July 16, 2001	Anderson Mesa	LONEOS	·	2.7 km	MPC · JPL
54859	2001 OG_{24}	—	July 16, 2001	Anderson Mesa	LONEOS	·	3.3 km	MPC · JPL
54860	2001 OZ_{24}	—	July 16, 2001	Haleakala	NEAT	·	2.5 km	MPC · JPL
54861	2001 OJ_{25}	—	July 18, 2001	Haleakala	NEAT	·	6.5 km	MPC · JPL
54862 Sundaigakuen	2001 OW_{25}	Sundaigakuen	July 23, 2001	Shishikui	Maeno, H.	·	2.8 km	MPC · JPL
54863 Gasnault	2001 OG_{28}	Gasnault	July 18, 2001	Palomar	NEAT	·	3.0 km	MPC · JPL
54864	2001 OP_{28}	—	July 18, 2001	Palomar	NEAT	·	4.2 km	MPC · JPL
54865	2001 OZ_{33}	—	July 19, 2001	Palomar	NEAT	GEF ·	7.2 km	MPC · JPL
54866	2001 OO_{39}	—	July 20, 2001	Palomar	NEAT	EOS	5.4 km	MPC · JPL
54867	2001 OS_{39}	—	July 20, 2001	Palomar	NEAT	·	3.7 km	MPC · JPL
54868	2001 OS_{40}	—	July 20, 2001	Palomar	NEAT	V	1.6 km	MPC · JPL
54869	2001 OP_{43}	—	July 22, 2001	Palomar	NEAT	VER	8.7 km	MPC · JPL
54870	2001 OT_{43}	—	July 23, 2001	Palomar	NEAT	·	4.9 km	MPC · JPL
54871	2001 OH_{44}	—	July 23, 2001	Palomar	NEAT	EOS	6.5 km	MPC · JPL
54872	2001 OW_{46}	—	July 16, 2001	Anderson Mesa	LONEOS	·	5.8 km	MPC · JPL
54873	2001 OC_{47}	—	July 16, 2001	Anderson Mesa	LONEOS	·	2.7 km	MPC · JPL
54874	2001 OQ_{47}	—	July 16, 2001	Haleakala	NEAT	AGN	3.1 km	MPC · JPL
54875	2001 OT_{47}	—	July 16, 2001	Anderson Mesa	LONEOS	LEO	7.8 km	MPC · JPL
54876	2001 OU_{47}	—	July 16, 2001	Anderson Mesa	LONEOS	·	2.9 km	MPC · JPL
54877	2001 OU_{51}	—	July 21, 2001	Palomar	NEAT	V	2.2 km	MPC · JPL
54878	2001 OB_{53}	—	July 21, 2001	Palomar	NEAT	MAR	3.7 km	MPC · JPL
54879	2001 OO_{54}	—	July 22, 2001	Palomar	NEAT	(5)	2.9 km	MPC · JPL
54880	2001 OT_{54}	—	July 22, 2001	Palomar	NEAT	·	3.6 km	MPC · JPL
54881	2001 OV_{54}	—	July 22, 2001	Palomar	NEAT	H	1.6 km	MPC · JPL
54882	2001 OK_{57}	—	July 16, 2001	Anderson Mesa	LONEOS	TEL	3.7 km	MPC · JPL
54883	2001 OS_{57}	—	July 19, 2001	Palomar	NEAT	KOR	5.1 km	MPC · JPL
54884	2001 OW_{58}	—	July 20, 2001	Palomar	NEAT	KOR	4.2 km	MPC · JPL
54885	2001 OH_{61}	—	July 21, 2001	Haleakala	NEAT	V	1.3 km	MPC · JPL
54886	2001 OO_{61}	—	July 21, 2001	Haleakala	NEAT	·	1.7 km	MPC · JPL
54887	2001 OG_{63}	—	July 26, 2001	Desert Beaver	W. K. Y. Yeung	·	8.7 km	MPC · JPL
54888	2001 OS_{63}	—	July 27, 2001	Anderson Mesa	LONEOS	EOS	4.3 km	MPC · JPL
54889	2001 OZ_{63}	—	July 23, 2001	Haleakala	NEAT	·	1.7 km	MPC · JPL
54890	2001 OS_{65}	—	July 28, 2001	Reedy Creek	J. Broughton	·	2.1 km	MPC · JPL
54891	2001 OP_{66}	—	July 23, 2001	Palomar	NEAT	·	3.1 km	MPC · JPL
54892	2001 OW_{68}	—	July 16, 2001	Haleakala	NEAT	EUN	4.8 km	MPC · JPL
54893	2001 OR_{69}	—	July 19, 2001	Anderson Mesa	LONEOS	·	10 km	MPC · JPL
54894	2001 OX_{69}	—	July 19, 2001	Anderson Mesa	LONEOS	(5)	3.4 km	MPC · JPL
54895	2001 OO_{70}	—	July 19, 2001	Anderson Mesa	LONEOS	(5)	2.9 km	MPC · JPL
54896	2001 OP_{70}	—	July 19, 2001	Anderson Mesa	LONEOS	HNS	4.2 km	MPC · JPL
54897	2001 OY_{71}	—	July 21, 2001	Anderson Mesa	LONEOS	KOR	4.7 km	MPC · JPL
54898	2001 OP_{72}	—	July 21, 2001	Anderson Mesa	LONEOS	·	3.6 km	MPC · JPL
54899	2001 OT_{72}	—	July 21, 2001	Anderson Mesa	LONEOS	·	4.3 km	MPC · JPL
54900	2001 OL_{74}	—	July 19, 2001	Palomar	NEAT	615	5.7 km	MPC · JPL

== 54901–55000 ==
back to top

Designation			Discovery			Properties		Ref
Permanent	Provisional	Named after	Date	Site	Discoverer(s)	Category	Diam.	Ref
54901	2001 OX_{75}	—	July 26, 2001	Palomar	NEAT	·	2.4 km	MPC · JPL
54902 Close	2001 OG_{77}	Close	July 23, 2001	Anza	M. Collins, White, M.	NYS	1.9 km	MPC · JPL
54903	2001 OV_{77}	—	July 26, 2001	Palomar	NEAT	·	1.9 km	MPC · JPL
54904	2001 OZ_{78}	—	July 26, 2001	Palomar	NEAT	·	5.3 km	MPC · JPL
54905	2001 OA_{80}	—	July 29, 2001	Palomar	NEAT	·	4.4 km	MPC · JPL
54906	2001 OT_{80}	—	July 29, 2001	Socorro	LINEAR	EUN	6.2 km	MPC · JPL
54907	2001 OW_{80}	—	July 29, 2001	Socorro	LINEAR	·	6.1 km	MPC · JPL
54908	2001 OY_{80}	—	July 29, 2001	Socorro	LINEAR	·	9.0 km	MPC · JPL
54909	2001 OP_{81}	—	July 29, 2001	Prescott	P. G. Comba	·	4.3 km	MPC · JPL
54910	2001 OC_{83}	—	July 27, 2001	Palomar	NEAT	·	1.7 km	MPC · JPL
54911	2001 OM_{83}	—	July 27, 2001	Palomar	NEAT	·	11 km	MPC · JPL
54912	2001 OX_{86}	—	July 29, 2001	Palomar	NEAT	·	7.7 km	MPC · JPL
54913	2001 OY_{87}	—	July 31, 2001	Palomar	NEAT	slow	4.0 km	MPC · JPL
54914	2001 OS_{88}	—	July 21, 2001	Haleakala	NEAT	·	3.6 km	MPC · JPL
54915	2001 OE_{89}	—	July 21, 2001	Haleakala	NEAT	·	4.6 km	MPC · JPL
54916	2001 OD_{92}	—	July 22, 2001	Palomar	NEAT	·	2.1 km	MPC · JPL
54917	2001 OL_{92}	—	July 22, 2001	Palomar	NEAT	·	6.4 km	MPC · JPL
54918	2001 OC_{94}	—	July 27, 2001	Anderson Mesa	LONEOS	·	2.4 km	MPC · JPL
54919	2001 OH_{94}	—	July 27, 2001	Anderson Mesa	LONEOS	·	5.0 km	MPC · JPL
54920	2001 OJ_{95}	—	July 30, 2001	Palomar	NEAT	·	6.2 km	MPC · JPL
54921	2001 OL_{95}	—	July 30, 2001	Palomar	NEAT	·	5.3 km	MPC · JPL
54922	2001 OO_{95}	—	July 31, 2001	Palomar	NEAT	MAS	1.8 km	MPC · JPL
54923	2001 OL_{96}	—	July 24, 2001	Palomar	NEAT	·	5.9 km	MPC · JPL
54924	2001 OA_{97}	—	July 25, 2001	Haleakala	NEAT	·	5.0 km	MPC · JPL
54925	2001 OT_{98}	—	July 26, 2001	Palomar	NEAT	·	2.5 km	MPC · JPL
54926	2001 OZ_{99}	—	July 27, 2001	Anderson Mesa	LONEOS	·	2.2 km	MPC · JPL
54927	2001 OD_{100}	—	July 27, 2001	Anderson Mesa	LONEOS	EOS	6.6 km	MPC · JPL
54928	2001 OF_{100}	—	July 27, 2001	Anderson Mesa	LONEOS	·	5.5 km	MPC · JPL
54929	2001 OZ_{101}	—	July 28, 2001	Anderson Mesa	LONEOS	EUN	4.4 km	MPC · JPL
54930	2001 OM_{102}	—	July 28, 2001	Haleakala	NEAT	·	4.4 km	MPC · JPL
54931	2001 OY_{102}	—	July 29, 2001	Anderson Mesa	LONEOS	EUN	6.2 km	MPC · JPL
54932 Waltharris	2001 OH_{103}	Waltharris	July 27, 2001	Anderson Mesa	LONEOS	THM	8.0 km	MPC · JPL
54933	2001 OV_{103}	—	July 29, 2001	Anderson Mesa	LONEOS	·	4.3 km	MPC · JPL
54934	2001 OH_{105}	—	July 29, 2001	Anderson Mesa	LONEOS	·	6.6 km	MPC · JPL
54935	2001 OY_{105}	—	July 29, 2001	Socorro	LINEAR	·	4.6 km	MPC · JPL
54936	2001 OA_{106}	—	July 29, 2001	Anderson Mesa	LONEOS	·	5.2 km	MPC · JPL
54937	2001 OH_{106}	—	July 29, 2001	Socorro	LINEAR	EUN	4.5 km	MPC · JPL
54938	2001 OG_{107}	—	July 29, 2001	Socorro	LINEAR	V	1.9 km	MPC · JPL
54939	2001 OP_{107}	—	July 29, 2001	Anderson Mesa	LONEOS	·	3.6 km	MPC · JPL
54940	2001 OQ_{107}	—	July 30, 2001	Socorro	LINEAR	·	3.3 km	MPC · JPL
54941	2001 OA_{108}	—	July 31, 2001	Socorro	LINEAR	ADE	13 km	MPC · JPL
54942	2001 OC_{111}	—	July 19, 2001	Palomar	NEAT	·	4.7 km	MPC · JPL
54943	2001 PC_{1}	—	August 7, 2001	Palomar	NEAT	·	4.1 km	MPC · JPL
54944	2001 PV_{1}	—	August 8, 2001	Haleakala	NEAT	·	1.4 km	MPC · JPL
54945	2001 PF_{2}	—	August 3, 2001	Haleakala	NEAT	slow	3.6 km	MPC · JPL
54946	2001 PO_{2}	—	August 3, 2001	Haleakala	NEAT	V	1.5 km	MPC · JPL
54947	2001 PM_{3}	—	August 5, 2001	Palomar	NEAT	·	5.2 km	MPC · JPL
54948	2001 PP_{3}	—	August 8, 2001	Haleakala	NEAT	·	1.5 km	MPC · JPL
54949	2001 PR_{3}	—	August 9, 2001	Palomar	NEAT	·	7.1 km	MPC · JPL
54950	2001 PF_{5}	—	August 9, 2001	Palomar	NEAT	·	2.4 km	MPC · JPL
54951	2001 PH_{6}	—	August 10, 2001	Haleakala	NEAT	THM	6.5 km	MPC · JPL
54952	2001 PL_{6}	—	August 10, 2001	Haleakala	NEAT	·	3.5 km	MPC · JPL
54953	2001 PS_{6}	—	August 10, 2001	Haleakala	NEAT	·	6.6 km	MPC · JPL
54954	2001 PU_{6}	—	August 10, 2001	Haleakala	NEAT	V	1.7 km	MPC · JPL
54955	2001 PL_{7}	—	August 5, 2001	Palomar	NEAT	·	4.3 km	MPC · JPL
54956	2001 PQ_{7}	—	August 8, 2001	Palomar	NEAT	·	11 km	MPC · JPL
54957	2001 PT_{7}	—	August 10, 2001	Palomar	NEAT	·	1.7 km	MPC · JPL
54958	2001 PK_{8}	—	August 11, 2001	Palomar	NEAT	·	3.3 km	MPC · JPL
54959	2001 PS_{8}	—	August 11, 2001	Haleakala	NEAT	·	5.7 km	MPC · JPL
54960	2001 PE_{10}	—	August 8, 2001	Haleakala	NEAT	·	4.6 km	MPC · JPL
54961	2001 PX_{10}	—	August 8, 2001	Haleakala	NEAT	·	3.1 km	MPC · JPL
54962	2001 PH_{12}	—	August 12, 2001	Palomar	NEAT	·	3.2 km	MPC · JPL
54963 Sotin	2001 PS_{12}	Sotin	August 12, 2001	Palomar	NEAT	·	4.0 km	MPC · JPL
54964	2001 PF_{27}	—	August 11, 2001	Haleakala	NEAT	V	1.6 km	MPC · JPL
54965	2001 PN_{27}	—	August 11, 2001	Haleakala	NEAT	·	2.8 km	MPC · JPL
54966	2001 PA_{28}	—	August 13, 2001	Haleakala	NEAT	·	5.3 km	MPC · JPL
54967 Millucci	2001 PF_{29}	Millucci	August 15, 2001	San Marcello	A. Boattini, L. Tesi	·	5.6 km	MPC · JPL
54968	2001 PY_{31}	—	August 10, 2001	Palomar	NEAT	·	3.8 km	MPC · JPL
54969	2001 PL_{34}	—	August 10, 2001	Palomar	NEAT	·	8.4 km	MPC · JPL
54970	2001 PE_{38}	—	August 11, 2001	Palomar	NEAT	(194)	2.9 km	MPC · JPL
54971	2001 PU_{42}	—	August 12, 2001	Palomar	NEAT	EOS	6.0 km	MPC · JPL
54972	2001 PY_{42}	—	August 12, 2001	Palomar	NEAT	·	6.4 km	MPC · JPL
54973	2001 PE_{44}	—	August 15, 2001	Haleakala	NEAT	KOR	2.9 km	MPC · JPL
54974	2001 PA_{45}	—	August 11, 2001	Haleakala	NEAT	·	5.1 km	MPC · JPL
54975	2001 PL_{47}	—	August 13, 2001	Haleakala	NEAT	·	8.1 km	MPC · JPL
54976	2001 PJ_{49}	—	August 13, 2001	Palomar	NEAT	EUN	3.3 km	MPC · JPL
54977	2001 PQ_{49}	—	August 14, 2001	Palomar	NEAT	·	7.1 km	MPC · JPL
54978	2001 PZ_{49}	—	August 15, 2001	Haleakala	NEAT	·	3.7 km	MPC · JPL
54979	2001 PP_{56}	—	August 14, 2001	Haleakala	NEAT	·	4.1 km	MPC · JPL
54980	2001 PN_{60}	—	August 13, 2001	Haleakala	NEAT	·	1.4 km	MPC · JPL
54981	2001 PU_{61}	—	August 13, 2001	Haleakala	NEAT	·	2.5 km	MPC · JPL
54982	2001 PH_{62}	—	August 13, 2001	Haleakala	NEAT	WIT	2.2 km	MPC · JPL
54983 Simone	2001 QE	Simone	August 16, 2001	San Marcello	M. Tombelli, A. Boattini	·	2.5 km	MPC · JPL
54984	2001 QR	—	August 16, 2001	Socorro	LINEAR	·	5.0 km	MPC · JPL
54985	2001 QQ_{1}	—	August 16, 2001	Socorro	LINEAR	·	2.6 km	MPC · JPL
54986	2001 QZ_{2}	—	August 16, 2001	Socorro	LINEAR	·	3.3 km	MPC · JPL
54987	2001 QT_{4}	—	August 16, 2001	Socorro	LINEAR	GEF	2.5 km	MPC · JPL
54988	2001 QW_{5}	—	August 16, 2001	Socorro	LINEAR	·	2.6 km	MPC · JPL
54989	2001 QB_{8}	—	August 16, 2001	Socorro	LINEAR	·	1.7 km	MPC · JPL
54990	2001 QW_{8}	—	August 16, 2001	Socorro	LINEAR	·	4.8 km	MPC · JPL
54991	2001 QT_{10}	—	August 16, 2001	Socorro	LINEAR	·	6.0 km	MPC · JPL
54992	2001 QO_{11}	—	August 16, 2001	Socorro	LINEAR	PAD	5.1 km	MPC · JPL
54993	2001 QF_{12}	—	August 16, 2001	Socorro	LINEAR	·	2.4 km	MPC · JPL
54994	2001 QF_{13}	—	August 16, 2001	Socorro	LINEAR	·	3.1 km	MPC · JPL
54995	2001 QS_{13}	—	August 16, 2001	Socorro	LINEAR	·	5.4 km	MPC · JPL
54996	2001 QW_{13}	—	August 16, 2001	Socorro	LINEAR	·	2.1 km	MPC · JPL
54997	2001 QZ_{13}	—	August 16, 2001	Socorro	LINEAR	ADE	8.8 km	MPC · JPL
54998	2001 QA_{14}	—	August 16, 2001	Socorro	LINEAR	·	4.3 km	MPC · JPL
54999	2001 QE_{16}	—	August 16, 2001	Socorro	LINEAR	·	3.9 km	MPC · JPL
55000	2001 QL_{18}	—	August 16, 2001	Socorro	LINEAR	·	2.3 km	MPC · JPL

back to top

== See also ==
- Meanings of minor-planet names: 54001–55000
