= Meanings of minor-planet names: 4001–5000 =

As minor planet discoveries are confirmed, they are given a permanent number by the IAU's Minor Planet Center (MPC), and the discoverers can then submit names for them, following the IAU's naming conventions. The list below concerns those minor planets in the specified number-range that have received names, and explains the meanings of those names.

Official naming citations of newly named small Solar System bodies are approved and published in a bulletin by IAU's Working Group for Small Bodies Nomenclature (WGSBN). Before May 2021, citations were published in MPC's Minor Planet Circulars for many decades. Recent citations can also be found on the JPL Small-Body Database (SBDB). Until his death in 2016, German astronomer Lutz D. Schmadel compiled these citations into the Dictionary of Minor Planet Names (DMP) and regularly updated the collection.

Based on Paul Herget's The Names of the Minor Planets, Schmadel also researched the unclear origin of numerous asteroids, most of which had been named prior to World War II. This article incorporates text from this source, which is in the public domain: SBDB New namings may only be added to this list below after official publication as the preannouncement of names is condemned. The WGSBN publishes a comprehensive guideline for the naming rules of non-cometary small Solar System bodies. As of May 2026, all but three objects in this range have been given names.

== 4001–4100 ==
Named minor planet	Provisional	This minor planet was named for...	Ref · Catalog
4001 Ptolemaeus	1949 PV	Ptolemy (c. AD 100–170), Greek astronomer	MPC · 4001
4002 Shinagawa	1950 JB	Seishi Shinagawa (born 1944), first to use electronic computers for orbit computation in Japan	MPC · 4002
4003 Schumann	1964 ED	Robert Schumann (1810–1856), German composer	MPC · 4003
4004 Listʹev	1971 SN_{1}	Vladislav Listyev (1956–1995), a Russian television journalist who was murdered	MPC · 4004
4005 Dyagilev	1972 TC_{2}	Sergei Diaghilev (1872–1929), Russian impresario	MPC · 4005
4006 Sandler	1972 YR	Grigori Sandler (1912–1994), a Russian musician	MPC · 4006
4007 Euryalos	1973 SR	Euryalos, mythical Greek warrior	MPC · 4007
4008 Corbin	1977 BY	Thomas E. Corbin, American astronomer, and his wife Brenda Corbin, Librarian, both at the US Naval Observatory	MPC · 4008
4009 Drobyshevskij	1977 EN_{1}	Edward Drobyshevski (1936–2012), Russian astro- and plasma physicist at Ioffe Institute in St. Petersburg	MPC · 4009
4010 Nikolʹskij	1977 QJ_{2}	Gennady Nikolsky (1929–1982), Soviet solar astronomer	MPC · 4010
4011 Bakharev	1978 SC_{6}	Anatoly Bakharev (1918–1979), observer and researcher on comets and meteors. He is one of the co-discoverers of the comet C/1955 N1 (Bakharev–Macfarlane–Krienke)	MPC · 4011
4012 Geballe	1978 VK_{9}	Tom Geballe (born 1944), American astronomer	MPC · 4012
4013 Ogiria	1979 OM_{15}	Maiya Borisovna Ogir' (1933–1991), Russian solar physicist	MPC · 4013
4014 Heizman	1979 SG_{10}	Leonie and Charles Heizman from San Juan Capistrano, California, who hosted the discoverer Nikolai Chernykh during the conference on Near Earth Asteroids in 1991	MPC · 4014
4015 Wilson–Harrington	1979 VA	American co-discoverers Albert G. Wilson (1918–2012) and Robert G. Harrington (1904–1987)	MPC · 4015
4016 Sambre	1979 XK	The Sambre River, France and Belgium	MPC · 4016
4017 Disneya	1980 DL_{5}	Walt Disney (1901–1966), American animator	MPC · 4017
4018 Bratislava	1980 YM	Bratislava, capital city of Slovakia	MPC · 4018
4019 Klavetter	1981 EK_{14}	James Jay Klavetter (1960–1997), professor of physics at California State University, Sacramento	MPC · 4019
4020 Dominique	1981 ET_{38}	Dominique Bockelée-Morvan (born 1957), researcher at the Paris Observatory, France	MPC · 4020
4021 Dancey	1981 QD_{2}	Roy Dancey and Bruce D. Dancey, father and son, both Canadian designers of telescope mirrors	MPC · 4021
4022 Nonna	1981 TL_{4}	Nonna Mordyukova (1925–2008), Soviet actress	MPC · 4022
4023 Jarník	1981 UN	Vojtěch Jarník (1897–1970), Czech mathematician	MPC · 4023
4024 Ronan	1981 WQ	Colin Ronan (1920–1995), author and writer on astronomy	MPC · 4024
4025 Ridley	1981 WU	Harold B. Ridley, British astrophotographer	MPC · 4025
4026 Beet	1982 BU_{1}	Ernest Agar Beet, teacher and amateur astronomer	MPC · 4026
4027 Mitton	1982 DN	Simon Mitton (born 1946), British astronomer and author	MPC · 4027
4028 Pancratz	1982 DV_{2}	Chris Pancratz (1950–2003), formerly of the National Space Society	MPC · 4028
4029 Bridges	1982 KC_{1}	Patricia M. Bridges, planetary cartographer with the U.S. Geological Survey	MPC · 4029
4030 Archenhold	1984 EO_{1}	Friedrich Simon Archenhold (1861–1939), a German astronomer and the first director the Archenhold Observatory in Berlin, who, in 1896, made it possible to build the world's longest refractor telescope with a focal length of 21 meters. The telescope was originally known as the Great Treptow Refractor.	MPC · 4030
4031 Mueller	1985 CL	Jean Mueller (born 1950), American astronomer and discoverer of comets, minor planets, and supernovae. The first woman to operate the historic Hooker telescope at Mount Wilson Observatory, and was the first woman hired as a telescope operator at Palomar Observatory in 1985.	MPC · 4031
4032 Chaplygin	1985 UT_{4}	Sergey Chaplygin (1869–1942), Russian and Soviet physicist and one of the founders of the aerodynamics	MPC · 4032
4033 Yatsugatake	1986 FA	Mount Yatsugatake, one of Japan's 100 famous mountains	MPC · 4033
4034 Vishnu	1986 PA	Vishnu is the Hindu god of preservation	JPL · 4034
4035 Thestor	1986 WD	Thestor was a grandson of Apollo and the father of Kalchas.	IAU · 4035
4036 Whitehouse	1987 DW_{5}	David Robert Whitehouse (born 1956), British science journalist and BBC Online's Science Editor, recipient of the European Internet Journalist of the Year award in 2002	JPL · 4036
4037 Ikeya	1987 EC	Kaoru Ikeya (born 1943), Japanese amateur astronomer	MPC · 4037
4038 Kristina	1987 QH_{2}	Kristina Leterme, Dutch literature professor and partner of the discoverer	MPC · 4038
4039 Souseki	1987 SH	Natsume Sōseki (1867–1916), Japanese novelist	MPC · 4039
4040 Purcell	1987 SN_{1}	Henry Purcell (1659–1695), English composer	MPC · 4040
4041 Miyamotoyohko	1988 DN_{1}	Yohko Miyamoto (born 1922) wife of Japanese astronomer, Yukio (or Sachio) Miyamoto	MPC · 4041
4042 Okhotsk	1989 AT_{1}	Sea of Okhotsk, between Japan and Russia	MPC · 4042
4043 Perolof	1175 T-3	Per Olof Lindblad, Swedish astronomer, director of the Stockholm Observatory, and son of Bertil Lindblad (1895–1965)	MPC · 4043
4044 Erikhøg	5142 T-3	Erik Høg (born 1932), Danish astronomer at the Copenhagen Observatory	MPC · 4044
4045 Lowengrub	1953 RG	Morton Lowengrub, American mathematician and forerunner of the WIYN Observatory at Kitt Peak, Arizona	MPC · 4045
4046 Swain	1953 TV	Joseph Swain (1857–1927), professor of mathematics at and president of Indiana University	MPC · 4046
4047 Chang'E	1964 TT_{2}	The Chinese moon goddess, Chang'e, and the Chinese lunar probe launched in 2007, initiating the Chinese Lunar Exploration Program	JPL · 4047
4048 Samwestfall	1964 UC	Richard S. Westfall (1924–1996), American historian of science	MPC · 4048
4049 Noragalʹ	1973 QD_{2}	Nora Galʹ (1912–1991), Soviet literary translator	MPC · 4049
4050 Mebailey	1976 SF	Mark Edward Bailey, British astronomer	MPC · 4050
4051 Hatanaka	1978 VP	Takeo Hatanaka (1914–1963), Japanese astronomer	MPC · 4051
4052 Crovisier	1981 DP_{2}	Jacques Crovisier (born 1948), French astronomer	MPC · 4052
4053 Cherkasov	1981 TQ_{1}	Nikolay Cherkasov (1903–1966), Soviet actor	MPC · 4053
4054 Turnov	1983 TL	Turnov, Czech Republic	MPC · 4054
4055 Magellan	1985 DO_{2}	Ferdinand Magellan (c. 1480–1521), Portuguese explorer	MPC · 4055
4056 Timwarner	1985 FZ_{1}	Timothy Warner (1961–1990), chief mission planner for the Diffuse Infrared Background Experiment	MPC · 4056
4057 Demophon	1985 TQ	Demophon, mythical king of Athens	MPC · 4057
4058 Cecilgreen	1986 JV	Cecil Howard Green (1900–2003), British geophysicist, co-founder of Texas Instruments and philanthropist extraordinary	MPC · 4058
4059 Balder	1987 SB_{5}	Balder, Norse god	MPC · 4059
4060 Deipylos	1987 YT_{1}	Deipylos, mythical Greek hero	MPC · 4060
4061 Martelli	1988 FF_{3}	Giuseppe Martelli, Italian architect and engineer	MPC · 4061
4062 Schiaparelli	1989 BF	Giovanni Schiaparelli (1835–1910), Italian astronomer best known for his telescopic observations of Mars	MPC · 4062
4063 Euforbo	1989 CG_{2}	Euphorbus (Euforbo), the Greek hero of the Trojan War, who wounded Patroclus in the breast before being killed by Hektor.	MPC · 4063
4064 Marjorie	2126 P-L	Marjorie Meinel (1922–2008), American astronomer	MPC · 4064
4065 Meinel	2820 P-L	Aden Meinel (1922–2011), American astronomer	MPC · 4065
4066 Haapavesi	1940 RG	Haapavesi, Finland, birthplace of the discoverer's father	MPC · 4066
4067 Mikhelʹson	1966 TP	Nikolaj Mikhelʹson (born 1918), outstanding Soviet scientist and optician of telescopes	MPC · 4067
4068 Menestheus	1973 SW	Menestheus, mythical king of Athens	MPC · 4068
4069 Blakee	1978 VL_{7}	Lawrence E. Blakee, observatory assistant	MPC · 4069
4070 Rozov	1980 RS_{2}	Victor Sergeevich Rozov (born 1913), Russian playwright	MPC · 4070
4071 Rostovdon	1981 RD_{2}	Rostov-on-Don, Russia, the discoverer's birthplace	MPC · 4071
4072 Yayoi	1981 UJ_{4}	Yayoi period in prehistoric Japan from 300 BC–300 AD during the Iron Age	MPC · 4072
4073 Ruianzhongxue	1981 UE_{10}	Ruianzhongxue (Ruian Middle School), Zhejiang, China, 110-year-old school of mathematics	JPL · 4073
4074 Sharkov	1981 UN_{11}	Viktor Sharkov (born 1935), an experimental astrophysicist at Ioffe Institute in St Petersburg, Russia	MPC · 4074
4075 Sviridov	1982 TL_{1}	Georgy Sviridov (1915–1998), Russian composer	MPC · 4075
4076 Dörffel	1982 UF_{4}	Georg Samuel Dörffel (1643–1688), German pastor and astronomer	MPC · 4076
4077 Asuka	1982 XV_{1}	Asuka period, from 6th century to 8th in Japan	MPC · 4077
4078 Polakis	1983 AC	Thomas A. Polakis (born 1961), an American mechanical engineer, friend of the discoverer Brian A. Skiff, and amateur astronomer at the Command Module Observatory (V02) in Arizona (Src, Src).	MPC · 4078
4079 Britten	1983 CS	Benjamin Britten (1913–1976), Baron Britten, British composer	MPC · 4079
4080 Galinskij	1983 PW	Nikolaj Galinskij, Soviet radio engineer	MPC · 4080
4081 Tippett	1983 RC_{2}	Michael Tippett (1905–1998), British composer	MPC · 4081
4082 Swann	1984 SW_{3}	Gordon A. Swann, American geologist, principal investigator for the geological field investigations conducted at the Apollo 14 and 15 lunar landing sites	MPC · 4082
4083 Jody	1985 CV	Joan D. Swann, planetary data librarian with the U.S. Geological Survey	MPC · 4083
4084 Hollis	1985 GM	Andrew J. Hollis, British astronomer	MPC · 4084
4085 Weir	1985 JR	Doris Blackman Weir, geologist with the U.S. Geological Survey	MPC · 4085
4086 Podalirius	1985 VK_{2}	Podalirius, mythical Greek warrior	MPC · 4086
4087 Pärt	1986 EM_{1}	Arvo Pärt (born 1935), Estonian composer	MPC · 4087
4088 Baggesen	1986 GG	Jens Baggesen (1764–1826), Danish poet and satirist	MPC · 4088
4089 Galbraith	1986 JG	John Kenneth Galbraith (1908–2006), Canadian-born, American economist and polemicist	JPL · 4089
4090 Říšehvězd	1986 RH_{1}	Říše hvězd, Czech astronomy journal	MPC · 4090
4091 Lowe	1986 TL_{2}	Andrew Lowe (born 1959), Canadian geophysicist and amateur astronomer	MPC · 4091
4092 Tyr	1986 TJ_{4}	Tyr, Norse god	MPC · 4092
4093 Bennett	1986 VD	Jack C. Bennett, South African amateur astronomer	MPC · 4093
4094 Aoshima	1987 QC	Masaki Aoshima (1947–1987), Japanese amateur astronomer	MPC · 4094
4095 Ishizuchisan	1987 SG	Ishizuchisan, mountain in Ehime, Japan	MPC · 4095
4096 Kushiro	1987 VC	Kushiro, city in Japan	MPC · 4096
4097 Tsurugisan	1987 WW	Tsurugisan, mountain in Tokushima, Japan	MPC · 4097
4098 Thraen	1987 WQ_{1}	Anton Thraen (1843–1902), German amateur astronomer and Catholic priest	MPC · 4098
4099 Wiggins	1988 AB_{5}	Patrick Wiggins (born 1949), American astronomy educator at the Hansen Planetarium (1975–2001) in Salt Lake City, UT. Currently NASA/JPL Solar System Ambassador	JPL · 4099
4100 Sumiko	1988 BF	Sumiko Hioki (born 1965), wife Japanese co-discoverer Tsutomu Hioki	MPC · 4100

== 4101–4200 ==
back to top

Named minor planet	Provisional	This minor planet was named for...	Ref · Catalog
4101 Ruikou	1988 CE	Ruikou Kuroiwa (1862–1920), Japanese writer	MPC · 4101
4102 Gergana	1988 TE_{3}	Gergana Georgieva Gelkova (born 2000) is the adorable grandniece of the discoverer. The name also honors the discoverer's parents, combining their first names Georgy and Ana	JPL · 4102
4103 Chahine	1989 EB	Moustafa Chahine, (1935–2011) Lebanese-American scientist, chief scientist for NASA JPL	MPC · 4103
4104 Alu	1989 ED	Jeff Alu (born 1966), American amateur astronomer and discoverer of minor planets who participated in the Palomar Planet-Crossing Asteroid Survey. He is a musician and composer.	MPC · 4104
4105 Tsia	1989 EK	Zia sun symbol used by the Zia people in New Mexico	MPC · 4105
4106 Nada	1989 EW	Nada Junior and Senior High School, in Kobe, Japan	MPC · 4106
4107 Rufino	1989 GT	Rufus J. Walker, supporter of the U.S. space program and friend of American discoverer, Eleanor F. Helin	MPC · 4107
4108 Rakos	3439 T-3	Karl D. Rakos (1925–2011), Croatian-born Austrian astronomer who was professor of astronomy at the University of Vienna and a director of the Vienna Observatory	MPC · 4108
4109 Anokhin	1969 OW	Sergei Anokhin (1910–1986), Russian test pilot and cosmonaut-select	MPC · 4109
4110 Keats	1977 CZ	John Keats (1795–1821), English romantic poet	MPC · 4110
4111 Lamy	1981 EN_{12}	Philippe Louis Lamy, French-born American astronomer at Laboratoire d'Astronomie Spatiale, Marseilles	MPC · 4111
4112 Hrabal	1981 ST	Bohumil Hrabal (1914–1997), Czech writer	MPC · 4112
4113 Rascana	1982 BQ	Royal Astronomical Society of Canada	MPC · 4113
4114 Jasnorzewska	1982 QB_{1}	Maria Pawlikowska-Jasnorzewska (1891–1945), Polish poet	MPC · 4114
4115 Peternorton	1982 QS_{3}	Peter Norton (born 1943), American software engineer	MPC · 4115
4116 Elachi	1982 SU	Charles Elachi (born 1947), Lebanese-American electrical engineering and planetary science at Caltech	MPC · 4116
4117 Wilke	1982 SU_{3}	Alfred Wilke (1893–1972), German optician	MPC · 4117
4118 Sveta	1982 TH_{3}	Svetlana Savitskaya (born 1948), Russian cosmonaut who became the second woman in space in 1982	MPC · 4118
4119 Miles	1983 BE	Howard G. Miles, member of the Order of the British Empire and director of the Artificial Satellite Section of the British Astronomical Association	MPC · 4119
4120 Denoyelle	1985 RS_{4}	Jozef Denoyelle (born 1937), Belgian astronomer	MPC · 4120
4121 Carlin	1986 JH	Carlin Singer-Brewster, daughter of Stephen Singer-Brewster, an American astronomer and discoverer of minor planets	MPC · 4121
4122 Ferrari	1986 OA	Enzo Ferrari (1898–1988), Italian builder of racing cars and sports cars	MPC · 4122
4123 Tarsila	1986 QP_{1}	Tarsila do Amaral (1886–1973), Brazilian modernist painter	JPL · 4123
4124 Herriot	1986 SE	James Herriot (1916–1995), British writer and veterinary surgeon	MPC · 4124
4125 Lew Allen	1987 MO	Lew Allen (1925–2010), American physicist, director of the Jet Propulsion Laboratory and a United States Air Force four-star general	MPC · 4125
4126 Mashu	1988 BU	Lake Mashū, a crater lake in Akan National Park on the island of Hokkaidō, Japan.	MPC · 4126
4127 Kyogoku	1988 BA_{2}	Kyōgoku, town in Japan	MPC · 4127
4128 UKSTU	1988 BM_{5}	UK Schmidt Telescope Unit at the Royal Observatory Edinburgh and the 1.2-m U.K. Schmidt Telescope at the Siding Spring Observatory in Australia	MPC · 4128
4129 Richelen	1988 DM	Richard A. Keen and Helen C. Duran, friends of the discoverer, Robert H. McNaught	MPC · 4129
4130 Ramanujan	1988 DQ_{1}	Srinivasa Ramanujan (1887–1920), Indian mathematician	MPC · 4130
4131 Stasik	1988 DR_{4}	John S. Stasik, American educator	MPC · 4131
4132 Bartók	1988 EH	Béla Bartók (1881–1945), Austro-Hungarian composer	MPC · 4132
4133 Heureka	1942 DB	Heureka, science center in Vantaa, Finland, north of Helsinki	MPC · 4133
4134 Schütz	1961 CR	Heinrich Schütz (1585–1672), German composer and organist of the 17th century	MPC · 4134
4135 Svetlanov	1966 PG	Yevgeny Svetlanov (1928–2002), Soviet-Russian conductor	MPC · 4135
4136 Artmane	1968 FJ	Vija Artmane (1929–2008), Latvian actress	MPC · 4136
4137 Crabtree	1970 WC	William Crabtree (1610–1644), an astronomer, mathematician, and cloth merchant in Salford, near Manchester, second person to knowingly observe a transit of Venus, in 1639	JPL · 4137
4138 Kalchas	1973 SM	Calchas, mythical person related to Trojan War	MPC · 4138
4139 Ulʹyanin	1975 VE_{2}	Sergej Alekseevich Ulʹyanin (1871–1921), Russian pilot and inventor of new airplane designs	MPC · 4139
4140 Branham	1976 VA	Richard L. Branham Jr (born 1943), American astronomer at U.S. Naval Observatory and director of the Yale-Columbia Southern Station at Leoncito Astronomical Complex	MPC · 4140
4141 Nintanlena	1978 PG_{3}	Nina, Tanya and Elena, wife and daughters of Kyiv astronomer Klim Churyumov (1937–2016)	MPC · 4141
4142 Dersu-Uzala	1981 KE	Dersu Uzala, character in eponymous novel by Vladimir Arsenyev	MPC · 4142
4143 Huziak	1981 QN_{1}	Richard Huziak (born 1957), Canadian amateur astronomer	MPC · 4143
4144 Vladvasilʹev	1981 SW_{6}	Vladimir Vasiliev (born 1940), Russian ballet dancer and choreographer	MPC · 4144
4145 Maximova	1981 SJ_{7}	Ekaterina Maximova (1939–2009), Soviet and Russian ballet dancer	MPC · 4145
4146 Rudolfinum	1982 DD_{2}	The Rudolfinum, important building in Prague	MPC · 4146
4147 Lennon	1983 AY	John Lennon (1940–1980), member of the Beatles	MPC · 4147
4148 McCartney	1983 NT	Paul McCartney (born 1942), member of the Beatles	MPC · 4148
4149 Harrison	1984 EZ	George Harrison (1943–2001), member of the Beatles	MPC · 4149
4150 Starr	1984 QC_{1}	Ringo Starr (born 1940), member of the Beatles	MPC · 4150
4151 Alanhale	1985 HV_{1}	Alan Hale (1958–2026), American astronomer who co-discovered Comet Hale–Bopp	MPC · 4151
4152 Weber	1985 JF	Carl Maria von Weber (1786–1826), German composer	MPC · 4152
4153 Roburnham	1985 JT_{1}	Robert Burnham Jr. (1931–1993), American astronomer, author, and senior editor of Astronomy magazine. He is a discoverer of minor planets and comets.	MPC · 4153
4154 Rumsey	1985 NE	Norman Rumsey (1922–2007), a New Zealand astronomer and optical designer	MPC · 4154
4155 Watanabe	1987 UB_{1}	Kazuro Watanabe (born 1955), Japanese amateur astronomer and discoverer of minor planets	MPC · 4155
4156 Okadanoboru	1988 BE	Noboru Okada (1953–2002), Japanese adventurer, photographer, mountain climber and amateur astronomer	JPL · 4156
4157 Izu	1988 XD_{2}	Izu Peninsula, Japan	MPC · 4157
4158 Santini	1989 BE	Giovanni Santini (1786–1877), Italian astronomer and director of the Padua Observatory (533) and author of textbook Elementi di Astronomia	MPC · 4158
4159 Freeman	1989 GK	Ann Freeman, executive secretary of the Seismological Laboratory of the California Institute of Technology, supporter of the Palomar Planet-Crossing Asteroid Survey and friend of discoverer Eleanor F. Helin	MPC · 4159
4160 Sabrina-John	1989 LE	Sabrina M. Gonsalves (1962–1980) and John H. Riggins (1962–1980) in memory of the young couple	MPC · 4160
4161 Amasis	6627 P-L	Amasis II (Amasis), Egyptian pharaoh	MPC · 4161
4162 SAF	1940 WA	Société Astronomique de France, the French Astronomical Society	MPC · 4162
4163 Saaremaa	1941 HC	Saaremaa island, Estonia	MPC · 4163
4164 Shilov	1969 UR	Alexandr Shilov (born 1943), Soviet-Russian painter	MPC · 4164
4165 Didkovskij	1976 GS_{3}	Leonid Vladimirovich Didkovskij (born 1948), astrophysicist and deputy director of the Crimean Astrophysical Observatory, who developed scientific instrumentation for the Soviet space telescope Astron	JPL · 4165
4166 Pontryagin	1978 SZ_{6}	Lev Pontryagin (1908–1988), Russian mathematician	MPC · 4166
4167 Riemann	1978 TQ_{7}	Bernhard Riemann (1826–1866), German mathematician	MPC · 4167
4168 Millan	1979 EE	Julio Rodolfo Millan (1923–1995), first rector of the National University of San Juan in Argentina, where the old Yale-Columbia Southern Station was located at the time	JPL · 4168
4169 Celsius	1980 FO_{3}	Anders Celsius (1701–1744), Swedish physicist and astronomer, after whom the Celsius temperature scale was named	MPC · 4169
4170 Semmelweis	1980 PT	Ignaz Semmelweis (1818–1865), German-Hungarian physician and an early pioneer of antiseptic procedures	MPC · 4170
4171 Carrasco	1982 FZ_{1}	Juan Carrasco, senior night assistant and operator of the Hale Telescope at the Palomar Observatory in California	MPC · 4171
4172 Rochefort	1982 FC_{3}	The town of Rochefort in Belgium	MPC · 4172
4173 Thicksten	1982 KG_{1}	Robert P. Thicksten, superintendent of Palomar Observatory	MPC · 4173
4174 Pikulia	1982 SB_{6}	Valentin Pikul (1928–1990), Soviet historical novelist	MPC · 4174
4175 Billbaum	1985 GX	William A. Baum (1924–2012), American astronomer Src	MPC · 4175
4176 Sudek	1987 DS	Josef Sudek (1896–1976), outstanding Czech photographer	JPL · 4176
4177 Kohman	1987 SS_{1}	Truman Paul Kohman (1916–2010), was an emeritus professor of nuclear chemistry at Carnegie-Mellon University, who co-discovered aluminium-26, an isotope that has given important information about meteorites and the early history of the Solar System. Kohman was also an ardent amateur astronomer and teacher. He coined the word "nuclide".	JPL · 4177
4178 Mimeev	1988 EO_{1}	Alexandr Pavlovich Mimeev (born 1951), Russian radio engineer and amateur astronomer	JPL · 4178
4179 Toutatis	1989 AC	Toutatis, Celtic god	MPC · 4179
4180 Anaxagoras	6092 P-L	Anaxagoras (c. 510–428 BC), Greek philosopher	MPC · 4180
4181 Kivi	1938 DK_{1}	Aleksis Kivi (1834–1872), the first Finnish-language dramatist and novelist	MPC · 4181
4182 Mount Locke	1951 JQ	Mount Locke, one of two mountains atop which the McDonald Observatory facilities are located	MPC · 4182
4183 Cuno	1959 LM	Cuno Hoffmeister (1892–1968), German astronomer and a discoverer of minor planets, comets and variable stars, who discovered this Apollo asteroid	MPC · 4183
4184 Berdyayev	1969 TJ_{1}	Nikolai Berdyaev (1874–1948), Russian philosopher	MPC · 4184
4185 Phystech	1975 ED	Moscow Institute of Physics and Technology (Phystech)	MPC · 4185
4186 Tamashima	1977 DT_{1}	Tamashima, a town of Kurashiki, Okayama, Japan	MPC · 4186
4187 Shulnazaria	1978 GR_{3}	Leonid Markovich Shul'man and Galina Kirillovna Nazarchuk, a couple of astronomers, researchers on comets, and staff members of the Main Ukrainian Astronomical Observatory at Golosseevo, near Kyiv	MPC · 4187
4188 Kitezh	1979 HX_{4}	Kitezh, phantom city of Russian folklore	MPC · 4188
4189 Sayany	1979 SV_{9}	The Sayan Mountains, a mountain chain in southern Siberia, Russia	MPC · 4189
4190 Kvasnica	1980 JH	Jozef Kvasnica (1930–1992), Czech physicist	MPC · 4190
4191 Assesse	1980 KH	The Belgian village of Assesse, birthplace of the father of the discoverer, Henri Debehogne	MPC · 4191
4192 Breysacher	1981 DH	Jacques Breysacher, French astronomer	MPC · 4192
4193 Salanave	1981 SM_{1}	Leon E. Salanave, originally a meteorologist, as first executive officer of the Astronomical Society of the Pacific and first editor of Mercury, he took steps to ensure that amateur astronomers felt a sense of "belonging" to an organization dominated by professionals.	JPL · 4193
4194 Sweitzer	1982 RE	Paul A. Sweitzer (born 1936), American reporter	MPC · 4194
4195 Esambaev	1982 SK_{8}	Makhmud Alisultanovich Esambayev (1924–2000), a Chechen folk dancer	MPC · 4195
4196 Shuya	1982 SA_{13}	The Russian town of Shuya, Ivanovo Oblast	MPC · 4196
4197 Morpheus	1982 TA	Morpheus, the god of dreams who appears in Ovid's "Metamorphoses"	JPL · 4197
4198 Panthera	1983 CK_{1}	Panthera, Latin word for panther	MPC · 4198
4199 Andreev	1983 RX_{2}	Gennadij Andreev (and his family), a professor of celestial mechanics at the University of Tomsk. He has led several expeditions to the site of the Tunguska event	MPC · 4199
4200 Shizukagozen	1983 WA	Shizuka Gozen (1165–1211), Japanese mistress of Minamoto no Yoshitsune	MPC · 4200

== 4201–4300 ==
back to top

Named minor planet	Provisional	This minor planet was named for...	Ref · Catalog
4201 Orosz	1984 JA_{1}	Elizabeth M. Orosz (born 1970), staff member at the Melton Memorial Observatory and friend of discoverer Brian Skiff	MPC · 4201
4202 Minitti	1985 CB_{2}	Michelle Minitti (born 1973), American areological mineralogist at Arizona State University who studies the mineralogy of Mars. She has identified a new hematite formation mechanism for Mars.	JPL · 4202
4203 Brucato	1985 FD_{3}	Robert Joseph Brucato, American astronomer and assistant director of the Palomar Observatory	MPC · 4203
4204 Barsig	1985 JG_{1}	Walter Barsig, German science teacher and director of the Annual Cultural Festival of the Ries of Nordlingen and a state school board in Bavaria, Germany	MPC · 4204
4205 David Hughes	1985 YP	David Hughes (born 1941), British astronomer and professor of astronomy at the University of Sheffield	MPC · 4205
4206 Verulamium	1986 QL	Verulamium is an ancient British Roman city, now St Albans, Hertfordshire	JPL · 4206
4207 Chernova	1986 RO_{2}	Galina Pavlovna Chernova, a researcher at the Astrophysical Institute of the Tajik Academy of Sciences, Dushanbe	MPC · 4207
4208 Kiselev	1986 RQ_{2}	Nikolaj Nikolaevich Kiselev, department head of the Astrophysical Institute of the Tajik Academy of Sciences, Dushanbe	MPC · 4208
4209 Briggs	1986 TG_{4}	Geoffrey A. Briggs, American space physicist and director of the Solar System Exploration Division at NASA Headquarters during the 1980s	MPC · 4209
4210 Isobelthompson	1987 DY_{5}	Isobel Thompson, British archaeologist and co-author of Alban's Buried Towns: An Assessment of St. Albans' Archaeology up to A.D. 1600	JPL · 4210
4211 Rosniblett	1987 RT	Rosalind Niblett, British archaeologist and co-author of Alban's Buried Towns: An Assessment of St. Albans' Archaeology up to A.D. 1600	JPL · 4211
4212 Sansyu-Asuke	1987 SB_{2}	Japanese town of Asuke, Aichi. The discovering Toyota Observatory (881) is located nearby in Toyota.	MPC · 4212
4213 Njord	1987 ST_{4}	Njord, Norse god of winds, navigation and prosperity	MPC · 4213
4214 Veralynn	1987 UX_{4}	Vera Lynn (born 1917), British singer, famous during World War II	MPC · 4214
4215 Kamo	1987 VE_{1}	Akira Kamo (born 1943), Japanese amateur astronomer who founded the Comet Observers Network (Hoshi no Hiroba) in 1968	MPC · 4215
4216 Neunkirchen	1988 AF_{5}	Neunkirchen, town in Austria	MPC · 4216
4217 Engelhardt	1988 BO_{2}	Wolf von Engelhardt (1910–2008), German meteorite researcher	MPC · 4217
4218 Demottoni	1988 BK_{3}	Glauco de Mottoni y Palacios (1901–1988), an Italian electrotechnical engineer and amateur astronomer	MPC · 4218
4219 Nakamura	1988 DB	Giichi Nakamura, founder of an optical instruments factory, Mitaka Kohki, Japan	MPC · 4219
4220 Flood	1988 DN	Thomas Flood (1919–1988), Scottish amateur astronomer, member of the British Astronomical Association and co-founder of the Dundee Astronomical Society in 1955	MPC · 4220
4221 Picasso	1988 EJ	Pablo Picasso (1881–1973), Spanish artist	MPC · 4221
4222 Nancita	1988 EK_{1}	Nancy Coker Helin, daughter-in-law of the discoverer Eleanor F. Helin	MPC · 4222
4223 Shikoku	1988 JM	Shikoku, Japan	MPC · 4223
4224 Susa	1988 KG	Susan and Sarah Hicks, daughters of Bill and Nancy Hicks enthusiast of space-related research (acquainted with discoverer E. F. Helin)	MPC · 4224
4225 Hobart	1989 BN	Joseph R. Hobart (born 1944) is an electrical engineer, amateur radio operator W7LUX, and minor-planet and variable-star observer. As of March 2011 he has improved the orbits of more than 700 minor planets, many of which were in danger of loss, and discovered 80 minor planets including NEO 2010 RA_{91}	JPL · 4225
4226 Damiaan	1989 RE	Father Damien (1840–1889), Belgian priest	MPC · 4226
4227 Kaali	1942 DC	Kaali crater, Estonia	MPC · 4227
4228 Nemiro	1968 OC_{1}	Andrej Nemiro (1909–1995), Russian astronomer at Pulkovo Observatory	MPC · 4228
4229 Plevitskaya	1971 BK	Nadezhda Plevitskaya (1884–1940), popular female Russian singer (and a Soviet agent)	MPC · 4229
4230 van den Bergh	1973 ST_{1}	Sidney van den Bergh (born 1929), Dutch-born Canadian astronomer	MPC · 4230
4231 Fireman	1976 WD	Edward Fireman (1922–1990), American planetary geologist and physicist at the Harvard-Smithsonian Center for Astrophysics, known for his measurements of radioactive isotopes to determine the cosmic-ray exposure ages of freshly fallen meteorites	MPC · 4231
4232 Aparicio	1977 CD	Emiliano Pedro Aparicio (1921–1988), mineralogist and geologist at the National University of Cuyo and the National University of San Juan	MPC · 4232
4233 Palʹchikov	1977 RO_{7}	Nikolaj Borisovich Palʹchikov (1913–1937), a student in the astronomy department at Leningrad University who was killed during one of Stalin's purges	MPC · 4233
4234 Evtushenko	1978 JT_{1}	Yevgeny Yevtushenko (1933–2017), Russian poet	MPC · 4234
4235 Tatishchev	1978 SL_{5}	Vasily Tatishchev (1686–1750), Russian statesman, historian and ethnographer	MPC · 4235
4236 Lidov	1979 FV_{1}	Mikhail Lidov (1926–1993), Soviet–Russian astronomer best known for the Kozai-Lidov mechanism	MPC · 4236
4237 Raushenbakh	1979 SD_{4}	Boris Rauschenbach (1915–2001), Russian space scientist	MPC · 4237
4238 Audrey	1980 GF	Audrey Hepburn (1929–1993), actress, born in Brussels, Belgium, to an English father and Dutch mother (a baroness)	MPC · 4238
4239 Goodman	1980 OE	Neville J. Goodman, a member of the British Astronomical Association	MPC · 4239
4240 Grün	1981 EY_{20}	Eberhard Grün (born 1942), German astronomer	MPC · 4240
4241 Pappalardo	1981 EX_{46}	Neil Pappalardo, pioneer in medical information technology, founder of Meditech and supporter of the Magellan Telescopes	MPC · 4241
4242 Brecher	1981 FQ	Aviva Brecher and Kenneth Brecher, American astronomers and staff members at MIT	MPC · 4242
4243 Nankivell	1981 GF_{1}	Garry Nankivell (born 1929), New Zealand optician who produced the optics of the 1-meter McLellan Telescope at the Mount John University Observatory, New Zealand	MPC · 4243
4244 Zakharchenko	1981 TO_{3}	Vasilij Dmitrievich Zakharchenko (1915–1999), a Russian journalist and writer	MPC · 4244
4245 Nairc	1981 UC_{10}	The Nanjing Astronomical Instrument Research Center (NAIRC) of Chinese Academy of Sciences, founded in 1958.	MPC · 4245
4246 Telemann	1982 SY_{2}	Georg Philipp Telemann (1681–1767), German composer	MPC · 4246
4247 Grahamsmith	1983 WC	Francis Graham-Smith (1923–2025), British astronomer, former Astronomer Royal	MPC · 4247
4248 Ranald	1984 HX	Ranald McIntosh (born 1933), programmer, who maintains the database for the Variable Star Section of the Royal Astronomical Society of New Zealand	MPC · 4248
4249 Křemže	1984 SC_{2}	Křemže, Czech Republic	MPC · 4249
4250 Perun	1984 UG	Perun, Slavic god of thunder	MPC · 4250
4251 Kavasch	1985 JK_{1}	Julius Kavasch (1920–1978) and son, Wulf-Dietrich Kavasch, both German amateur geologists and popular science writers about the impact crater in the Nördlinger Ries in western Bavaria, Germany	MPC · 4251
4252 Godwin	1985 RG_{4}	Richard Godwin (born 1952), American board member of the Space Frontier Foundation, brother of Robert Godwin, space expert and space-history researcher	JPL · 4252
4253 Märker	1985 TN_{3}	Wolfgang Märker, a German long-time supporter of geological research. His factory is located on the edge of the Ries impact crater, known as Nördlinger Ries. It is one of the world's best-studied impact craters.	MPC · 4253
4254 Kamél	1985 UT_{3}	Lars Kamél (born 1960), Swedish astronomer	MPC · 4254
4255 Spacewatch	1986 GW	The Spacewatch project	MPC · 4255
4256 Kagamigawa	1986 TX	Kagami River, Japan	MPC · 4256
4257 Ubasti	1987 QA	Ubasti Egyptian goddess of feline	MPC · 4257
4258 Ryazanov	1987 RZ_{2}	Eldar Ryazanov (1927–2015), a Soviet movie producer, writer and poet	MPC · 4258
4259 McCoy	1988 SB_{3}	Timothy James McCoy (born 1964), American planetary geologist and curator of the national meteorite collection at the National Museum of Natural History in Washington	MPC · 4259
4260 Yanai	1989 AX	Masayuki Yanai (born 1959), Japanese amateur astronomer and discoverer of minor planets	MPC · 4260
4261 Gekko	1989 BJ	Gekko Observatory, Japan	MPC · 4261
4262 DeVorkin	1989 CO	David H. DeVorkin (born 1944), Chair of the Historical Astronomy Division of the American Astronomical Society (1997–1999)	JPL · 4262
4263 Abashiri	1989 RL_{2}	Abashiri, Hokkaidō, Japan	MPC · 4263
4264 Karljosephine	1989 TB	Karl Wilhelm Cwach and Josephine Anna-Maria Cwach, parents of the discoverer Karl F. J. Cwach	MPC · 4264
4265 Kani	1989 TX	Kani, Gifu, Japan	MPC · 4265
4266 Waltari	1940 YE	Mika Waltari (1908–1979), Finnish author	MPC · 4266
4267 Basner	1971 QP	Veniamin Basner (1925–1996), Russian composer	MPC · 4267
4268 Grebenikov	1972 TW_{3}	Evgenij Alexandrovich Grebenikov (Eugeniu Grebenicov), Romanian-born Russian mathematician and astronomer	MPC · 4268
4269 Bogado	1974 FN	Manuel D. Bogado (born 1934) is a Paraguayan amateur astronomer, known for his contributions to amateur astronomy in his country and for his work involving astrophotography and variable stars. The name was suggested by W. A. Froger	JPL · 4269
4270 Juanvictoria	1975 TJ_{6}	Juan Victoria (1906–1986), a mining engineer by training, legal representative of the Yale-Columbia Southern Observatory (YCSO) station when it was under construction in the early 1960s, and supervised the construction of the dome and facilities for the U.S. Naval Observatory's station nearby. He also taught and researched in the engineering department of the Cuyo National University	JPL · 4270
4271 Novosibirsk	1976 GQ_{6}	Novosibirsk, Russia	MPC · 4271
4272 Entsuji	1977 EG_{5}	Entsuji, temple of Okayama, Japan	MPC · 4272
4273 Dunhuang	1978 UU_{1}	Dunhuang, China	MPC · 4273
4274 Karamanov	1980 RZ_{3}	Alemdar Karamanov, Ukrainian composer of symphonies, ballets, piano concerti, musicals and cinema films such as the 1965 movie Triumph Over Violence.	MPC · 4274
4275 Bogustafson	1981 EW_{14}	Bo Åke Sture Gustafson (born 1953), Swedish-American astronomer at the University of Florida who studied small particles in the Solar System, their formation, evolution and fate	MPC · 4275
4276 Clifford	1981 XA	Clifford Cunningham (born 1955), Canadian amateur astronomer and writer, known for his book Introduction to Asteroids	MPC · 4276
4277 Holubov	1982 AF	Holubov, Czech Republic	MPC · 4277
4278 Harvey	1982 SF	G. Roger Harvey, American educator and visual observer of minor planets who was instructor in astronomy at the University of North Carolina in Charlotte	MPC · 4278
4279 De Gasparis	1982 WB	Annibale de Gasparis (1819–1892), Italian astronomer and early discoverer of minor planets who was the director of the Astronomical Observatory of Capodimonte in Naples	MPC · 4279
4280 Simonenko	1985 PF_{2}	Alla Nikolaevna Simonenko (1935–1984), Russian or Ukrainian astronomer who published two books on the study of asteroids and studied study meteoroid fragmentation and the distribution of radiants	MPC · 4280
4281 Pounds	1985 TE_{1}	Kenneth Pounds (born 1934), British astronomer	MPC · 4281
4282 Endate	1987 UQ_{1}	Kin Endate (born 1960), Japanese amateur astronomer and discoverer of minor planets	MPC · 4282
4283 Stöffler	1988 BZ	Dieter Stöffler, German astronomer and director of the Institute for Planetology at the University of Münster	MPC · 4283
4284 Kaho	1988 FL_{3}	Shigeru Kaho (1909–1981), Japanese astronomer and observer of variable stars at the Tokyo Observatory. He discovered comet C/1936 O1 (Kaho-Kozik-Lis; a.k.a. comet 1936 III), the first Japanese cometary discovery in modern times.	MPC · 4284
4285 Hulkower	1988 NH	Neal D. Hulkower, American mathematician and celestial mechanician	MPC · 4285
4286 Rubtsov	1988 PU_{4}	Nikolay Rubtsov (1936–1971), Russian poet	MPC · 4286
4287 Třísov	1989 RU_{2}	Třísov, Czech Republic	MPC · 4287
4288 Tokyotech	1989 TQ_{1}	Tokyo Institute of Technology, the largest national institution of higher learning in Japan dedicated to science and technology	JPL · 4288
4289 Biwako	1989 UA_{2}	Biwako, largest lake in Japan	MPC · 4289
4290 Heisei	1989 UK_{3}	The Heisei era, Japanese history	MPC · 4290
4291 Kodaihasu	1989 VH	Ancient Lotus, that seed was excavated from Yayoi ruins and germinated in Japan	MPC · 4291
4292 Aoba	1989 VO	Aoba Castle, Sendai, Miyagi, Japan	MPC · 4292
4293 Masumi	1989 VT	Masumi Hurukawa (also Masumi Furukawa; 1917–?), Japanese worked for public outreach of astronomy in Kyushu, and a board member of the International Foundation for Cultural Harmony	MPC · 4293
4294 Horatius	4016 P-L	Horace (Quintus Horatius Flaccus; 65–8 BC), Roman poet	MPC · 4294
4295 Wisse	6032 P-L	Marijke Wisse-Schouten, staff member at Leiden Observatory and photometrist with the Palomar–Leiden trojan surveys during the 1970s	MPC · 4295
4296 van Woerkom	1935 SA_{2}	Adriaan van Woerkom, Dutch astronomer who worked at Leiden and Yale observatories on the distribution of comets and on celestial mechanics.	MPC · 4296
4297 Eichhorn	1938 HE	Heinrich Karl Eichhorn (born 1927), Austrian-American astronomer, teacher of astronomy and innovator in the field of stellar positions and motions	JPL · 4297
4298 Jorgenúnez	1941 WA	Jorge Núnez (born 1953), physicist, astronomer and member of the Royal Academy of Sciences and Arts of Barcelona, researcher of robotic observatories and the treatment of astronomical CCD images	JPL · 4298
4299 WIYN	1952 QX	The WIYN Consortium of observatories	MPC · 4299
4300 Marg Edmondson	1955 SG_{1}	Margaret Russell Edmondson (1914–1999), daughter of American astronomer Henry Norris Russell and wife of American astronomer Frank K. Edmondson	MPC · 4300

== 4301–4400 ==
back to top

Named minor planet	Provisional	This minor planet was named for...	Ref · Catalog
4301 Boyden	1966 PM	Uriah A. Boyden (1804–1879), American mechanical engineer, whose bequest allowed the Harvard College Observatory to establish the Boyden Observatory	JPL · 4301
4302 Markeev	1968 HP	Anatolij Pavlovich Markeev, professor at the Moscow Aviation Institute	MPC · 4302
4303 Savitskij	1973 SZ_{3}	Yevgeniy Savitskiy (1910–1990), Russian aviator, father of cosmonaut Svetlana Savitskaya	MPC · 4303
4304 Geichenko	1973 SW_{4}	Semyon Stepanovich Geichenko, Russian writer and literary scholar	MPC · 4304
4305 Clapton	1976 EC	Eric Clapton (born 1945), British musician	MPC · 4305
4306 Dunaevskij	1976 SZ_{5}	Isaak Dunayevsky (1900–1955), Soviet composer	MPC · 4306
4307 Cherepashchuk	1976 UK_{2}	Anatolii Mikhailovich Cherepashchuk (born 1941), Russian astronomer and director of the Sternberg Astronomical Institute	MPC · 4307
4308 Magarach	1978 PL_{4}	Research Institute of wine-making and viticulture at Magarach, Yalta	MPC · 4308
4309 Marvin	1978 QC	Ursula Marvin (1921–2018), American planetary geologist	MPC · 4309
4310 Strömholm	1978 RJ_{7}	Stig Strömholm (born 1931), Swedish legal scholar and writer	MPC · 4310
4311 Zguridi	1978 SY_{6}	Aleksandr Mikhajlovich Zguridi (1904–1998), Soviet producer	MPC · 4311
4312 Knacke	1978 WW_{11}	Roger Fritz Knacke (born 1941), American astronomer	MPC · 4312
4313 Bouchet	1979 HK_{1}	Patrice Bouchet (born 1953), French astronomer at the European Southern Observatory	MPC · 4313
4314 Dervan	1979 ML_{3}	Peter Dervan, the Bren Professor of Chemistry at the California Institute of Technology	JPL · 4314
4315 Pronik	1979 SL_{11}	Iraida and Vladimir Pronik (born 1932), astronomers at the Crimean Astrophysical Observatory	MPC · 4315
4316 Babinkova	1979 TZ_{1}	Artur Nikolaevich Babin (born 1936) and his wife Aleksandra Koval', solar astrophysicists at the Crimean Astrophysical Observatory	MPC · 4316
4317 Garibaldi	1980 DA_{1}	Giuseppe Garibaldi (1807–1882), Italian nation-builder	MPC · 4317
4318 Baťa	1980 DE_{1}	Tomáš Baťa (1876–1932), Czech businessman	MPC · 4318
4319 Jackierobinson	1981 ER_{14}	Jackie Robinson (1919–1972), American baseball player	JPL · 4319
4320 Jarosewich	1981 EJ_{17}	Eugene Jarosewich (1926–2007), research chemist emeritus at the Smithsonian Institution	JPL · 4320
4321 Zero	1981 EH_{26}	Zero Mostel (1915–1977), an American actor, singer and artist; also chosen because the asteroid's number sounds like a countdown	JPL · 4321
4322 Billjackson	1981 EE_{37}	William M. Jackson (born 1936) of the Department of Chemistry, University of California	MPC · 4322
4323 Hortulus	1981 QN	Hortulus, Latin word for a small, cozy garden	MPC · 4323
4324 Bickel	1981 YA_{1}	Wolf Bickel (born 1942), a German amateur astronomer who started observing minor planets in 1995 at his private observatory, located close to Bergisch Gladbach	JPL · 4324
4325 Guest	1982 HL	John Edward Guest (1938–2012), British volcanologist and planetary scientist (also see other Solar System features named after him) Src	MPC · 4325
4326 McNally	1982 HS_{1}	Derek McNally (1934-2020), British astronomer	MPC · 4326
4327 Ries	1982 KB_{1}	The Nördlinger Ries, a meteorite impact crater in southern Germany, that was formed about 14 million years ago	MPC · 4327
4328 Valina	1982 SQ_{2}	Valentina Arkadievna Andreichenko and daughter Alina Eduardovna, for their collaboration with the discoverer Henri Debehogne in the Tomsk-Observatory-Brussels-Program	MPC · 4328
4329 Miró	1982 SX_{2}	Joan Miró (1893–1983), a famous Spanish Catalan painter, sculptor and ceramicist.	JPL · 4329
4330 Vivaldi	1982 UJ_{3}	Antonio Vivaldi (1678–1741), Italian composer	MPC · 4330
4331 Hubbard	1983 HC	Ralph Hubbard (1885–1980), of Medora, North Dakota, involved in promoting and preserving Native American culture	MPC · 4331
4332 Milton	1983 RC	Daniel J. Milton, American astrogeologist	MPC · 4332
4333 Sinton	1983 RO_{2}	William M. Sinton, American astronomer	MPC · 4333
4334 Foo	1983 RO_{3}	Lillian Foo (born 1972), Singaporean consultant at the World Bank	MPC · 4334
4335 Verona	1983 VC_{7}	Verona, city in Italy	MPC · 4335
4336 Jasniewicz	1984 QE_{1}	Gerard Jasniewicz, astronomer at Strasbourg Observatory	MPC · 4336
4337 Arecibo	1985 GB	Arecibo Observatory, Puerto Rico	MPC · 4337
4338 Velez	1985 PB_{1}	Reinaldo Velez, telescope operator at Arecibo Observatory	MPC · 4338
4339 Almamater	1985 UK	Alma mater, in anticipation of the 650th anniversary of the Charles University in Prague, the oldest university in central Europe	MPC · 4339
4340 Dence	1986 JZ	Michael R. Dence, Canadian geologist and executive director of the Royal Society of Canada	MPC · 4340
4341 Poseidon	1987 KF	Poseidon, Greek god	MPC · 4341
4342 Freud	1987 QO_{9}	Sigmund Freud (1856–1939), Austrian founder of psychoanalysis	MPC · 4342
4343 Tetsuya	1988 AC	Tetsuya Fujii (born 1960), Japanese astronomer	MPC · 4343
4344 Buxtehude	1988 CR_{1}	Dieterich Buxtehude (c. 1637–1707), Danish or German organist and composer	MPC · 4344
4345 Rachmaninoff	1988 CM_{2}	Sergei Rachmaninoff (1873–1943), Russian composer, pianist and conductor	MPC · 4345
4346 Whitney	1988 DS_{4}	Mary Watson Whitney (1847–1921), American astronomer	MPC · 4346
4347 Reger	1988 PK_{2}	Max Reger (1873–1916), German composer	MPC · 4347
4348 Poulydamas	1988 RU	Poulydamas, the closest counselor and strategist of the Trojan prince Hector. Born on the same night, the gods gave Hector the ability to perfectly master his arms, while Poulydamas was given the present of better judgment. It was Poulydamas who urged to lock the gates of Troy against Achilles, but Hector left the city and confronted Achilles nonetheless.	MPC · 4348
4349 Tibúrcio	1989 LX	Julio Cesar dos Santos Tibúrcio, Brazilian amateur astronomer	MPC · 4349
4350 Shibecha	1989 UG_{1}	Shibecha, Hokkaidō, Japan	MPC · 4350
4351 Nobuhisa	1989 UR_{1}	Nobuhisa Kojima (born 1933), Japanese amateur astronomer	MPC · 4351
4352 Kyoto	1989 UW_{1}	Kyoto, city in Japan	MPC · 4352
4353 Onizaki	1989 WK_{1}	Onizaki, town in Tokoname, Aichi, Japan	MPC · 4353
4354 Euclides	2142 P-L	Euclid (fl. 300 BC), Greek mathematician	MPC · 4354
4355 Memphis	3524 P-L	Memphis, former capital of old Egyptian kingdom	MPC · 4355
4356 Marathon	9522 P-L	Marathon, Greece	MPC · 4356
4357 Korinthos	2069 T-2	Korinthos, Greece	MPC · 4357
4358 Lynn	A909 TF	William Thynne Lynne (1835–1911), assistant at Greenwich Observatory	MPC · 4358
4359 Berlage	1935 TG	Hendrik Petrus Berlage (1896–1968), Dutch meteorologist, son of architect Hendrik Petrus Berlage	MPC · 4359
4360 Xuyi	1964 TG_{2}	Xuyi County, China	MPC · 4360
4361 Nezhdanova	1977 TG_{7}	Antonina Nezhdanova (1873–1950), Russian opera singer	MPC · 4361
4362 Carlisle	1978 PR_{4}	Albert John Carlisle (1917–1993), hunter of meteorites on the Nullarbor Plain of Western Australia	MPC · 4362
4363 Sergej	1978 TU_{7}	Sergej Vasil'evich Ezhov (born 1953), surgeon in the district hospital at Bakhchisaraj, Crimea, since the 1970s	MPC · 4363
4364 Shkodrov	1978 VV_{5}	Vladimir Shkodrov (1930–2010), Bulgarian astronomer	MPC · 4364
4365 Ivanova	1978 VH_{8}	Violeta G. Ivanova, Bulgarian astronomer	MPC · 4365
4366 Venikagan	1979 YV_{8}	Veniamin Kagan (1869–1953), Soviet and Russian mathematician	MPC · 4366
4367 Meech	1981 EE_{43}	Karen Jean Meech (born 1959), American astronomer	MPC · 4367
4368 Pillmore	1981 JC_{2}	Charles L. Pillmore, American geologist with the U.S. Geological Survey	MPC · 4368
4369 Seifert	1982 OR	Jaroslav Seifert (1901–1986), Czech poet	MPC · 4369
4370 Dickens	1982 SL	Charles Dickens (1812–1870), English writer	MPC · 4370
4371 Fyodorov	1983 GC_{2}	Svyatoslav Fyodorov (1927–2000), Russian ophthalmologist	MPC · 4371
4372 Quincy	1984 TB	John Quincy Adams (1767–1848), sixth president of the United States	MPC · 4372
4373 Crespo	1985 PB	Antonio Crespo, electrical engineer at Arecibo Observatory	MPC · 4373
4374 Tadamori	1987 BJ	Taira no Tadamori, early samurai	MPC · 4374
4375 Kiyomori	1987 DQ	Taira no Kiyomori, early samurai and Daijō Daijin	MPC · 4375
4376 Shigemori	1987 FA	Taira no Shigemori, early samurai	MPC · 4376
4377 Koremori	1987 GD	Taira no Koremori, early samurai	MPC · 4377
4378 Voigt	1988 JF	Hans-Heinrich Voigt (1921–2017), German astronomer	MPC · 4378
4379 Snelling	1988 PT_{1}	Reginald and Heather Snelling, friends of the discoverers Eugene and Carolyn Shoemaker	MPC · 4379
4380 Geyer	1988 PB_{2}	Edward H. Geyer, German astronomer at the Hoher List Observatory	MPC · 4380
4381 Uenohara	1989 WD_{1}	Uenohara, town in Japan	MPC · 4381
4382 Stravinsky	1989 WQ_{3}	Igor Stravinsky (1882–1971), Russian-American composer	MPC · 4382
4383 Suruga	1989 XP	Suruga Province (ancient name of eastern part of Shizuoka Prefecture), Japan	MPC · 4383
4384 Henrybuhl	1990 AA	Henry Buhl Jr. (1848–1927), a philanthropist who established the Buhl Foundation	JPL · 4384
4385 Elsässer	2534 P-L	Hans F. Elsässer (born 1929), German astronomer, former director of the Max Planck Institute for Astronomy	MPC · 4385
4386 Lüst	6829 P-L	Reimar Lüst (born 1923), German astrophysicist	MPC · 4386
4387 Tanaka	4829 T-2	Yasuo Tanaka (1931–2018), Japanese astrophysicist	MPC · 4387
4388 Jürgenstock	1964 VE	Jürgen Stock (born 1923), German-Venezuelan astronomer, developer of observatories, and the director of the CTIO and the Llano del Hato observatories in South America	MPC · 4388
4389 Durbin	1976 GL_{3}	Deanna Durbin (1921–2013), Canadian-American cinema actress	MPC · 4389
4390 Madreteresa	1976 GO_{8}	Mother Teresa (1910–1997), an Albanian-Indian nun and missionary. She is known as Saint Teresa of Calcutta in the Roman Catholic Church.	JPL · 4390
4391 Balodis	1977 QW_{2}	Jānis Balodis, chief of the cosmic geodesy department at the Astronomical Observatory of the Latvian University	MPC · 4391
4392 Agita	1978 RX_{5}	Agita Tarasova, a scientific worker at the Astronomical Observatory of the Latvian University	MPC · 4392
4393 Dawe	1978 VP_{8}	John A. Dawe, British astronomer at the UK Schmidt Telescope	MPC · 4393
4394 Fritzheide	1981 EB_{19}	Fritz Heide (1891–1973), German meteorite researcher	MPC · 4394
4395 Danbritt	1981 EH_{41}	Daniel Britt (born 1950), research professor at the University of Tennessee, who studies the relationships between minor planets and meteorites using reflectance spectroscopy	JPL · 4395
4396 Gressmann	1981 JH	Michael Gressmann, German astro-optician and amateur astronomer	MPC · 4396
4397 Jalopez	1981 JS_{1}	José Augusto Lopez (born 1922), astronomer and long-time director of the Felix Aguilar Observatory in Argentina	MPC · 4397
4398 Chiara	1984 HC_{2}	Chiara Maria Faletti (born 1955), wife of the discoverer Walter Ferreri	MPC · 4398
4399 Ashizuri	1984 UA	Cape Ashizuri, Kochi, Japan	MPC · 4399
4400 Bagryana	1985 QH_{4}	Elisaveta Bagriana (1893–1991), Bulgarian poet	MPC · 4400

== 4401–4500 ==
back to top

Named minor planet	Provisional	This minor planet was named for...	Ref · Catalog
4401 Aditi	1985 TB	Aditi, Hindu goddess of the sky and air	MPC · 4401
4402 Tsunemori	1987 DP	Taira no Tsunemori (1124–1185), early samurai	MPC · 4402
4403 Kuniharu	1987 EA	Kuniharu Observatory, founded in 1958 in Okazaki, Aichi prefecture, Japan	MPC · 4403
4404 Enirac	1987 GG	Carine Maury, wife of the French astronomer Alain Maury, who discovered this minor planet	MPC · 4404
4405 Otava	1987 QD_{1}	Otava River, Czech Republic	MPC · 4405
4406 Mahler	1987 YD_{1}	Gustav Mahler (1860–1911), Austrian composer	MPC · 4406
4407 Taihaku	1988 TF_{1}	Taihaku-ku, Sendai, the southernmost ward of the city Sendai, Japan	MPC · 4407
4408 Zlatá Koruna	1988 TH_{2}	Zlatá Koruna, a gothic monastery and a village in South Bohemia, Czech Republic	MPC · 4408
4409 Kissling	1989 MD	Warwick M. Kissling (born 1957), New Zealand mathematician	MPC · 4409
4410 Kamuimintara	1989 YA	Daisetsuzan's another name in Ainu mythology - meaning Playground of Kamuys	MPC · 4410
4411 Kochibunkyo	1990 AF	The Kochi Prefecture Cultural and Educational Association, an association of volunteers active in education including the popularization of astronomy. The association was inaugurated in the city of Kochi in April 1948.	MPC · 4411
4412 Chephren	2535 P-L	Khafra (Chephren), pharaoh of the Fourth dynasty of Egypt who built the eponymous pyramid at Giza and the Sphinx	MPC · 4412
4413 Mycerinos	4020 P-L	Menkaura (Mycerinos), pharaoh of the Fourth dynasty of Egypt	MPC · 4413
4414 Sesostris	4153 P-L	Senusret I, Senusret II, and Senusret III (Sesostris I, II and III), three pharaohs of the Twelfth dynasty of Egypt	MPC · 4414
4415 Echnaton	4237 P-L	Akhenaten (Echnaton), pharaoh of the Eighteenth dynasty of Egypt	MPC · 4415
4416 Ramses	4530 P-L	Ramesses II, pharaoh of the Nineteenth dynasty of Egypt	MPC · 4416
4417 Lecar	1931 GC	Myron Lecar (born 1930), American astrophysicist	MPC · 4417
4418 Fredfranklin	1931 TR_{1}	Fred Aldrich Franklin (born 1932), American astronomer	MPC · 4418
4419 Allancook	1932 HD	Allan F. Cook II (1922–1998), American astrophysicist	MPC · 4419
4420 Alandreev	1936 PB	Aleksandr Fedorovich Andreev (born 1939), vice-president of the Russian Academy of Sciences and director of the P. Kapitsa Institute of Physical Problems in Moscow.	JPL · 4420
4421 Kayor	1942 AC	Kay and Roy Williams, parents of Gareth V. Williams, an astronomer at the Minor Planet Center	MPC · 4421
4422 Jarre	1942 UA	Jean-Michel Jarre (born 1948), a French composer, and his father Maurice Jarre (1924–2009)	MPC · 4422
4423 Golden	1949 GH	William T. Golden (1909–2007), author-editor of books on science policy.	JPL · 4423
4424 Arkhipova	1967 DB	Irina Konstantinovna Arkhipova (born 1925), Russian soloist at the Bolshoi Theatre	MPC · 4424
4425 Bilk	1967 UQ	German city district Düsseldorf-Bilk, where the Düsseldorf-Bilk Observatory (German: Sternwarte Bilk) existed from 1843 to 1943	JPL · 4425
4426 Roerich	1969 TB_{6}	Nicholas Roerich (1874–1947), Russian painter, as well as for Elena Ivanovna Roerich (1879–1955), Russian writer, Yurij Nikolaevich Roerich (1902–1960), Russian scientist, and Svetoslav Roerich (1904–1993), Russian painter	MPC · 4426
4427 Burnashev	1971 QP_{1}	Vladislav Ivanovich Burnashev (born 1943) also Bella Alekseevna Burnasheva (born 1944) (Crimean Astrophysical Observatory)	MPC · 4427
4428 Khotinok	1977 SN	Roman L'vovich Khotinok (1928–2016), Russian meteorite researcher	MPC · 4428
4429 Chinmoy	1978 RJ_{2}	Sri Chinmoy (1931–2007), Indian poet, artist and philosopher	MPC · 4429
4430 Govorukhin	1978 SX_{6}	Stanislav Govorukhin (1936–2018), Russian cinematic producer and playwright	MPC · 4430
4431 Holeungholee	1978 WU_{14}	S. H. Ho, K.-K. Leung, T. Ho and Q.-W. Lee jointly established the Holeungholee Foundation in 1994 to reward high-level Chinese achievements in science and technology and to promote the further development of those achievements	JPL · 4431
4432 McGraw-Hill	1981 ER_{22}	the McGraw-Hill Telescope at the MDM Observatory	MPC · 4432
4433 Goldstone	1981 QP	Goldstone Deep Space Communications Complex, California	MPC · 4433
4434 Nikulin	1981 RD_{5}	Yuri Nikulin (1921–1997), a Russian circus artist, clown and film star	MPC · 4434
4435 Holt	1983 AG_{2}	Henry E. Holt (born 1929), a discoverer of minor planets and planetary geologist with the U.S. Geological Survey	MPC · 4435
4436 Ortizmoreno	1983 EX	José Luis Ortiz Moreno (born 1967), a planetary scientist at the IAA (CSIC) at Granada, Spain	JPL · 4436
4437 Yaroshenko	1983 GA_{2}	Nikolai Yaroshenko (1846–1898), Russian/Ukrainian painter	MPC · 4437
4438 Sykes	1983 WR	Mark V. Sykes, American planetary scientist at the Steward Observatory, Arizona	MPC · 4438
4439 Muroto	1984 VA	Muroto, Kōchi, city in Japan	MPC · 4439
4440 Tchantchès	1984 YV	Tchantchès (Walloon dialect for François), the typical Walloon hero of the region of the discoverer. Tchantchès is obstinate but has a great heart	JPL · 4440
4441 Toshie	1985 BB	Toshie Seki, mother of Japanese astronomer Tsutomu Seki, who discovered this minor planet	MPC · 4441
4442 Garcia	1985 RB_{1}	Jerry Garcia (1942–1995), lead guitarist of the Grateful Dead	MPC · 4442
4443 Paulet	1985 RD_{4}	Pedro Paulet (1874–1945), Peruvian scientist and diplomat	JPL · 4443
4444 Escher	1985 SA	M. C. Escher (1898–1972), Dutch graphic artist	JPL · 4444
4445 Jimstratton	1985 TC	James Michael Stratton (born 1976), an American space engineer, helped further the exploration of the planets through his roles as both the propulsion and deputy mission systems engineer on NASA's New Horizons Pluto-Kuiper Belt mission.	JPL · 4445
4446 Carolyn	1985 TT	Carolyn Shoemaker (1929–2021), comet and asteroid discoverer	MPC · 4446
4447 Kirov	1985 VE_{1}	After Kirov, the city in Russia, or after the Kirov Opera and Ballet Theatre	MPC · 4447
4448 Phildavis	1986 EO	Philip A. Davis, astronomer and planetary geologist with the U.S. Geological Survey	MPC · 4448
4449 Sobinov	1987 RX_{3}	Leonid Sobinov (1872–1934), Russian opera singer	MPC · 4449
4450 Pan	1987 SY	Pan god of Arcady	MPC · 4450
4451 Grieve	1988 JJ	Richard Andrew Francis Grieve, Canadian geologist with the Geological Survey of Canada	MPC · 4451
4452 Ullacharles	1988 RN	Ulla Augustesen (1914–1990) and Charles Augustesen (1909–1987), the parents of Brorfelde observer Karl Augustesen	JPL · 4452
4453 Bornholm	1988 VC	The beautiful and famous Danish rocky island of Bornholm is situated in the southern part of the Baltic Sea	JPL · 4453
4454 Kumiko	1988 VW	Kumiko Kaneda (born 1951), wife of Japanese astronomer Hiroshi Kaneda, who co-discovered this minor planet	MPC · 4454
4455 Ruriko	1988 XA	Ruriko Ueda (born 1957), wife of Japanese astronomer Seiji Ueda, who co-discovered this minor planet	MPC · 4455
4456 Mawson	1989 OG	Sir Douglas Mawson (1882–1958), Antarctic explorer	MPC · 4456
4457 van Gogh	1989 RU	Vincent van Gogh (1853–1890), Dutch painter	MPC · 4457
4458 Oizumi	1990 BY	Ōizumi, Yamanashi, Japan	MPC · 4458
4459 Nusamaibashi	1990 BP_{2}	Nusamai Bridge, located in Kushiro, on the Island of Hokkaidō in northern Japan	MPC · 4459
4460 Bihoro	1990 DS	Bihoro, town in Japan	MPC · 4460
4461 Sayama	1990 EL	Sayama, Saitama, Japan	MPC · 4461
4462 Vaughan	1952 HJ_{2}	Curtis T. Vaughan Jr., a businessman, and community leader of San Antonio, Texas	MPC · 4462
4463 Marschwarzschild	1954 UO_{2}	Martin Schwarzschild (1912–1997), German-American astrophysicist	MPC · 4463
4464 Vulcano	1966 TE	Aeolian Islands, site of the "original" volcano	MPC · 4464
4465 Rodita	1969 TD_{5}	Tat'yana Mikhajlovna Rodina (1914–1989), a Soviet art critic, was the author of Russian Theatre Art at the Beginning of the 19th Century and Blok and Russian Theatre of the Beginning of the 20th Century, as well as of numerous papers in the Great Soviet Encyclopedia and the Theatre Encyclopedia.	JPL · 4465
4466 Abai	1971 SX_{1}	Abai Qunanbaiuli (Abai Kunanbaev) (1845–1904), Kazakh poet and philosopher	MPC · 4466
4467 Kaidanovskij	1975 VN_{2}	Naum L'vovich Kaidanovskii (1907–), Russian astronomer	MPC · 4467
4468 Pogrebetskij	1976 SZ_{3}	Mikhail Pogrebetskiy (1892–1956), Ukrainian mountaineer	MPC · 4468
4469 Utting	1978 PS_{4}	Muriel Utting (1914–), Australian historian of the Perth Observatory	MPC · 4469
4470 Sergeev-Censkij	1978 QP_{1}	Sergey Sergeev-Tsensky (1875–1958), Soviet writer	MPC · 4470
4471 Graculus	1978 VB	Pyrrhocorax graculus is the Alpine species of choughs. In great flocks they are sometimes a bit of a nuisance, but to watch their masterly elegant flight, especially in turbulent air, is a great delight	JPL · 4471
4472 Navashin	1980 TY_{14}	Mikhail Sergeevich Navashin (1896–1973), Russian author of the Teleskop astronoma-lyubitelya (The Amateur Astronomer's Telescope)	MPC · 4472
4473 Sears	1981 DE_{2}	Derek W. G. Sears (born 1948), British meteoriticist	MPC · 4473
4474 Proust	1981 QZ_{2}	Dominique Proust, French astrophysicist	MPC · 4474
4475 Voitkevich	1982 UQ_{5}	Georgii Vitol'dovich Voitkevich (1920–1997), Russian geochemist	MPC · 4475
4476 Bernstein	1983 DE	Leonard Bernstein (1918–1990), American composer, conductor and pianist	MPC · 4476
4477 Kelley	1983 SB	Michael Shawn Kelley (born 1958), a program officer at the Planetary Science Division, NASA Headquarters, Washington, D.C.	JPL · 4477
4478 Blanco	1984 HG_{1}	Carlo Blanco, professor of astronomy at Catania University	MPC · 4478
4479 Charlieparker	1985 CP_{1}	Charlie "Bird" Parker (1920–1955), American saxophonist, principal inventor of bebop	JPL · 4479
4480 Nikitibotania	1985 QM_{4}	Nikitian State Botanical Gardens, founded in 1812, on the Crimean peninsula	MPC · 4480
4481 Herbelin	1985 RR	Claude Herbelin (born 1931), Swiss electrotechnical engineer of Neuchâtel and friend of the family of Edward L. G. Bowell (discoverer)	JPL · 4481
4482 Frèrebasile	1986 RB	Nicolas Dupont, a French professor of mathematics, amateur astronomer and member of the De La Salle Brothers,	MPC · 4482
4483 Petöfi	1986 RC_{2}	Sándor Petőfi (1823–1849), Hungarian poet	MPC · 4483
4484 Sif	1987 DD	Sif, Norse goddess	MPC · 4484
4485 Radonezhskij	1987 QQ_{11}	Sergij Radonezhskij (c. 1321–1391), Russian church official	MPC · 4485
4486 Mithra	1987 SB	Mithra, Indo-Iranian god	MPC · 4486
4487 Pocahontas	1987 UA	Pocahontas, Native American woman	MPC · 4487
4488 Tokitada	1987 UK	Taira no Tokitada (1130–1189), early samurai	MPC · 4488
4489 Dracius	1988 AK	Dracius was one of the commanders of the Epeans who fought to protect the Argive ships from Hektor's attack.	IAU · 4489
4490 Bambery	1988 ND	Raymond Bambery, American chemist and image-processing scientist at JPL	MPC · 4490
4491 Otaru	1988 RP	Otaru, Hokkaidō, Japan	MPC · 4491
4492 Debussy	1988 SH	Claude Debussy (1862–1918), French composer	MPC · 4492
4493 Naitomitsu	1988 TG_{1}	Mitsu Naito (born 1925), mother of the first female Japanese astronaut, Chiaki Mukai	JPL · 4493
4494 Marimo	1988 TK_{1}	Marimo, a rare growth form of green algae that inhabit Lake Akan in Hokkaido, Japan.	MPC · 4494
4495 Dassanowsky	1988 VS	Elfi Dassanowsky (1924–2007), an Austrian-born film pioneer	JPL · 4495
4496 Kamimachi	1988 XM_{1}	Kamimachi, town in Kōchi, Japan. Birthplace of discover	MPC · 4496
4497 Taguchi	1989 AE_{1}	Takeo Taguchi (born 1950), Japanese optical engineer	MPC · 4497
4498 Shinkoyama	1989 AG_{1}	Shin Koyama (born 1927), Japanese astronomer	MPC · 4498
4499 Davidallen	1989 AO_{3}	David Anthony Allen, British astronomer	MPC · 4499
4500 Pascal	1989 CL	Blaise Pascal (1623–1662), French mathematician, physicist, and religious philosopher	MPC · 4500

== 4501–4600 ==
back to top

Named minor planet	Provisional	This minor planet was named for...	Ref · Catalog
4501 Eurypylos	1989 CJ_{3}	Eurypylos, mythical king of Thessaly	MPC · 4501
4502 Elizabethann	1989 KG	Elizabeth Ann Holt, daughter of the discoverer Henry E. Holt	MPC · 4502
4503 Cleobulus	1989 WM	Ancient Greek poet Cleobulus, one of the Seven Sages of Greece	MPC · 4503
4504 Jenkinson	1989 YO	Nora Jenkinson, Scottish amateur astronomer and astronomy educator	MPC · 4504
4505 Okamura	1990 DV_{1}	Keiichiro Okamura, Japanese headmaster	MPC · 4505
4506 Hendrie	1990 FJ	Michael J. Hendrie, British amateur astronomer and author, astronomy correspondent for The Times	MPC · 4506
4507 Petercollins	1990 FV	Peter L. Collins, American amateur astronomer	JPL · 4507
4508 Takatsuki	1990 FG_{1}	Yukihiro Takatsuki, contributing editor of Japanese astronomical magazine	MPC · 4508
4509 Gorbatskij	A917 SG	Vitaly Gerasimovich Gorbatskij (born 1920), professor at St. Petersburg University	JPL · 4509
4510 Shawna	1930 XK	Shawna Willoughby, granddaughter of the discoverer Clyde Tombaugh	MPC · 4510
4511 Rembrandt	1935 SP_{1}	Rembrandt Harmenszoon van Rijn, Dutch painter and engraver	MPC · 4511
4512 Sinuhe	1939 BM	Sinuhe, hero of The Egyptian by Mika Waltari	MPC · 4512
4513 Louvre	1971 QW_{1}	The Louvre, museum	MPC · 4513
4514 Vilen	1972 HX	Vilen Valentinovich Nesterov, Russian astronomer	MPC · 4514
4515 Khrennikov	1973 SD_{6}	Tikhon Nikolayevich Khrennikov, Russian composer	JPL · 4515
4516 Pugovkin	1973 SN_{6}	Mikhail Pugovkin, Russian comic actor	MPC · 4516
4517 Ralpharvey	1975 SV	Ralph Harvey (born 1960), An assistant professor at Case Western University	JPL · 4517
4518 Raikin	1976 GP_{3}	Arkady Raikin, Russian actor	MPC · 4518
4519 Voronezh	1976 YO_{4}	Voronezh, Russia	MPC · 4519
4520 Dovzhenko	1977 QJ_{3}	Alexander Dovzhenko, Ukrainian filmmaker	MPC · 4520
4521 Akimov	1979 FU_{2}	Nikolai Pavlovich Akimov, Ukrainian scenic designer and stage designer	MPC · 4521
4522 Britastra	1980 BM	British Astronomical Association	MPC · 4522
4523 MIT	1981 DM_{1}	Massachusetts Institute of Technology	JPL · 4523
4524 Barklajdetolli	1981 RV_{4}	Prince Michael Andreas Barclay de Tolly, Russian field marshal of Scottish descent	MPC · 4524
4525 Johnbauer	1982 JB_{3}	John Bauer, American teacher of astronomy and physics	JPL · 4525
4526 Konko	1982 KN_{1}	Konkō, Okayama, Japan	MPC · 4526
4527 Schoenberg	1982 OK	Arnold Schoenberg, Austrian-American composer	MPC · 4527
4528 Berg	1983 PP	Alban Berg, Austrian composer	MPC · 4528
4529 Webern	1984 ED	Anton Webern, Austrian composer	MPC · 4529
4530 Smoluchowski	1984 EP	Roman Smoluchowski, Polish-born physicist and astrophysicist	MPC · 4530
4531 Asaro	1985 FC	Frank Asaro, American nuclear chemist and colleague of Walter and Louis Alvarez	MPC · 4531
4532 Copland	1985 GM_{1}	Aaron Copland, American composer	MPC · 4532
4533 Orth	1986 EL	Charles J. Orth, American geochemist at the Los Alamos National Laboratory, New Mexico	MPC · 4533
4534 Rimskij-Korsakov	1986 PV_{4}	Nikolai Rimsky-Korsakov (1844–1908), Russian composer	MPC · 4534
4535 Adamcarolla	1986 QV_{2}	Adam Carolla, American comedic radio and television personality, former co-host of the syndicated radio program Loveline	JPL · 4535
4536 Drewpinsky	1987 DA_{6}	David Drew Pinsky (Dr. Drew), American doctor who co-hosts the syndicated radio program Loveline	JPL · 4536
4537 Valgrirasp	1987 RR_{3}	Valentin Rasputin, Soviet writer	MPC · 4537
4538 Vishyanand	1988 TP	Viswanathan (Vishy) Anand (born 1969), India's first chess grandmaster	JPL · 4538
4539 Miyagino	1988 VU_{1}	Miyagino-ku, Sendai, Miyagi, Japan	MPC · 4539
4540 Oriani	1988 VY_{1}	Barnaba Oriani (Barnabus Oriani), Italian astronomer	MPC · 4540
4541 Mizuno	1989 AF	Yoshikane Mizuno, Japanese amateur astronomer	MPC · 4541
4542 Mossotti	1989 BO	Ottaviano-Fabrizio Mossotti, Italian physicist and astronomer	MPC · 4542
4543 Phoinix	1989 CQ_{1}	Phoinix, mythical Greek warrior	MPC · 4543
4544 Xanthus	1989 FB	Xanthus (Greek word for "Fair"), was one of Achilles' semi-divine horses (in the Iliad). Also Xanthus (or Xanthos) is the name given to the river God, (known as Scamander or Skamandros to mortals). The official naming citation also mentions that it is an alternative name for the Olympian god Apollo.	MPC · 4544
4545 Primolevi	1989 SB_{11}	Primo Levi (1919–1987), an Italian chemist and writer	JPL · 4545
4546 Franck	1990 EW_{2}	César Franck, Belgian composer	MPC · 4546
4547 Massachusetts	1990 KP	Massachusetts, United States	MPC · 4547
4548 Wielen	2538 P-L	Roland Wielen (born 1938), German astronomer	MPC · 4548
4549 Burkhardt	1276 T-2	Gernot Burkhardt (born 1951), German astronomer, co-editor of Astronomy and Astrophysics Abstracts	MPC · 4549
4550 Royclarke	1977 HH_{1}	Roy Clarke Jr. (born 1925) served as curator of the U.S. National Meteorite Collection at the Smithsonian Institution for nearly 30 years. Clarke's research interests have focused on the structures of iron meteorites and have included the classification and study of Antarctic iron meteorites	JPL · 4550
4551 Cochran	1979 MC	Anita Light Cochran, American astronomer and William David Cochran, American astronomer	MPC · 4551
4552 Nabelek	1980 JC	Jan Nabelek, Moravian teacher	MPC · 4552
4553 Doncampbell	1982 RH	Donald B. Campbell, Australian-born astronomer and planetary scientist at Cornell University	MPC · 4553
4554 Fanynka	1986 UT	"Fanynka" Burian, friend of the discoverer	MPC · 4554
4555 Josefapérez	1987 QL	María Josefa Pérez (1970–2014), an astronomer at the Instituto de Astronomía y Física del Espacio, Buenos Aires, and at the La Plata Astronomical Observatory	JPL · 4555
4556 Gumilyov	1987 QW_{10}	Nikolay Gumilyov, Russian poet	MPC · 4556
4557 Mika	1987 XD	Mika Watanabe, wife of one of discovers	MPC · 4557
4558 Janesick	1988 NF	James R. Janesick, American optical engineer	MPC · 4558
4559 Strauss	1989 AP_{6}	Johann Strauss II, Austrian composer	MPC · 4559
4560 Klyuchevskij	1976 YD_{2}	Vasily Klyuchevsky, Russian historian	MPC · 4560
4561 Lemeshev	1978 RY_{5}	Sergey Lemeshev, Russian opera singer	MPC · 4561
4562 Poleungkuk	1979 UD_{2}	This name celebrates the 125th anniversary of the founding of Po Leung Kuk, a famous charity in Hong Kong. With a firm commitment to care and protection for the young and the innocent, Po Leung Kuk serves the local community	JPL · 4562
4563 Kahnia	1980 OG	Franz D. Kahn, professor of astronomy and head of the department of astronomy at the University of Manchester	MPC · 4563
4564 Clayton	1981 ET_{16}	Robert Clayton (born 1930), a professor at the University of Chicago	JPL · 4564
4565 Grossman	1981 EZ_{17}	Lawrence Grossman (born 1946), Canadian-American geophysicist	MPC · 4565
4566 Chaokuangpiu	1981 WM_{4}	Kuang-Piu Chao, consulting professor at Tsinghua University and Zhejiang University. For many years, he made remarkable contributions to the development of Chinese educational and cultural programs	JPL · 4566
4567 Bečvář	1982 SO_{1}	Antonín Bečvář, Czech astronomer	MPC · 4567
4568 Menkaure	1983 RY_{3}	Pharaoh Menkaure (c. 2530 B.C.), the son of Chephren	MPC · 4568
4569 Baerbel	1985 GV_{1}	Baerbel K. Lucchitta, planetary geologist with the U.S. Geological Survey	MPC · 4569
4570 Runcorn	1985 PR	Keith Runcorn (Stanley Keith Runcorn), British geophysicist	JPL · 4570
4571 Grumiaux	1985 RY_{3}	Arthur Grumiaux, Belgian violinist	MPC · 4571
4572 Brage	1986 RF	Brage, Norse god of poetry and music	MPC · 4572
4573 Piešťany	1986 TP_{6}	Slovak spa town of Piešťany	MPC · 4573
4574 Yoshinaka	1986 YB	Minamoto no Yoshinaka, early samurai	MPC · 4574
4575 Broman	1987 ME_{1}	Brian Roman, American astronomer	MPC · 4575
4576 Yanotoyohiko	1988 CC	Toyohiko Yano (born 1952) is a professor at the Research Laboratory for Nuclear Reactors, Tokyo Institute of Technology. His major work is materials science, particularly in the field of ceramics, and he is also a skillful electron microscopist. In their youth, he and the discoverer climbed mountains together	JPL · 4576
4577 Chikako	1988 WG	Chikako Mitsuhashi (or Mihashi), Japanese astronomical educator	MPC · 4577
4578 Kurashiki	1988 XL_{1}	Kurashiki, Okayama, Japan	MPC · 4578
4579 Puccini	1989 AT_{6}	Giacomo Antonio Domenico Michele Secondo Maria Puccini, Italian operatic composer	MPC · 4579
4580 Child	1989 EF	Jack B. Child, astronomer	MPC · 4580
4581 Asclepius	1989 FC	Asclepius, god of medicine	MPC · 4581
4582 Hank	1989 FW	Henry Reid Holt, son of discoverer of minor planets Henry E. Holt	MPC · 4582
4583 Lugo	1989 RL_{4}	Raymond Lugo (born 1957), American deputy launch services manager on NASA's New Horizons Pluto-Kuiper Belt mission	JPL · 4583
4584 Akan	1990 FA	Akan National Park, Hokkaidō, Japan	MPC · 4584
4585 Ainonai	1990 KQ	Ainonai, a small Japanese town on Hokkaidō, west of Kitami	MPC · 4585
4586 Gunvor	6047 P-L	Gunvor Ulla Marie Ollongren-Lundgren, wife of Dutch astronomer Alexander Ollongren	MPC · 4586
4587 Rees	3239 T-2	Martin Rees (born 1942), English astrophysicist and longtime Astronomer Royal	MPC · 4587
4588 Wislicenus	1931 EE	Walter F. Wislicenus (1859–1905), a German astronomer	JPL · 4588
4589 McDowell	1933 OB	Jonathan McDowell (born 1960), American astrophysicist	MPC · 4589
4590 Dimashchegolev	1968 OG_{1}	Dmytrij Evgen'evich Shchegolev (1928–1988), a Russian astronomer at the Pulkovo Observatory near Saint Petersburg	MPC · 4590
4591 Bryantsev	1975 VZ	Alexander Bryantsev (1883–1961), Russian theatre director	MPC · 4591
4592 Alkissia	1979 SQ_{11}	Aleksej Alekseevich Kiselev (born 1927), Russian astronomer	MPC · 4592
4593 Reipurth	1980 FV_{1}	Bo Reipurth, Danish astronomer	MPC · 4593
4594 Dashkova	1980 KR_{1}	Ekaterina Romanovna Dashkova, Russian princess	MPC · 4594
4595 Prinz	1981 EZ_{2}	Martin Prinz (born 1931), American curator of meteorites at the American Museum of Natural History	JPL · 4595
4597 Consolmagno	1983 UA_{1}	Guy Consolmagno, American astronomer	JPL · 4597
4598 Coradini	1985 PG_{1}	Marcello Coradini, Italian planetary scientist or Angioletta Coradini, Italian planetary scientist	MPC · 4598
4599 Rowan	1985 RZ_{2}	Michael Rowan-Robinson, British astronomer	JPL · 4599
4600 Meadows	1985 RE_{4}	Jack Meadows, British astronomer	JPL · 4600

== 4601–4700 ==
back to top

Named minor planet	Provisional	This minor planet was named for...	Ref · Catalog
4601 Ludkewycz	1986 LB	The maiden name of the Ukrainian-born mother of the discoverer, American NASA astronomer, writer, cartoonist, planetary scientist, artist and Hollywood special effects animator Marian Rudnyk	MPC · 4601
4602 Heudier	1986 UD_{3}	Jean Louis Heudier, French astronomer	MPC · 4602
4603 Bertaud	1986 WM_{3}	Charles Bertaud, French astronomer	MPC · 4603
4604 Stekarstrom	1987 SK	Stephen E. and Karen M. Strom, American astronomers and photographers	JPL · 4604
4605 Nikitin	1987 SV_{17}	Afanasy Nikitin, Russian explorer and travel writer	MPC · 4605
4606 Saheki	1987 UM_{1}	Tsuneo Saeki, Japanese astronomer and president of the Toa Astronomical Society	MPC · 4606
4607 Seilandfarm	1987 WR	Seiland Farm, Hokkaidō, Japan	MPC · 4607
4608 Wodehouse	1988 BW_{3}	Sir P. G. Wodehouse, British comic writer	JPL · 4608
4609 Pizarro	1988 CT_{3}	Guido and Oscar Pizarro, Chilean astronomers	MPC · 4609
4610 Kájov	1989 FO	Village of Kájov, Czech Republic	MPC · 4610
4611 Vulkaneifel	1989 GR_{6}	Volcanic Eifel (German: Vulkaneifel), a landscape in Germany, shaped by its volcanic geological history	MPC · 4611
4612 Greenstein	1989 JG	Jesse L. Greenstein, an expert in stellar spectroscopy	JPL · 4612
4613 Mamoru	1990 OM	Mamoru Mohri, Japanese astronaut	MPC · 4613
4614 Masamura	1990 QN	Kazutada Masamura, Japanese amateur astronomer	MPC · 4614
4615 Zinner	A923 RH	Ernst Zinner, German astronomer and historian of astronomy	MPC · 4615
4616 Batalov	1975 BF	Aleksei Vladimirovich Batalov, Russian actor	MPC · 4616
4617 Zadunaisky	1976 DK	Pedro E. Zadunaisky (1918–), Argentinian astronomer and mathematician	MPC · 4617
4618 Shakhovskoj	1977 RJ_{3}	Nikolaj Mikhailovich Shakhovskoj (born 1930), astrophysicist at the Crimean Astrophysical Observatory	MPC · 4618
4619 Polyakhova	1977 RB_{7}	Elena Nikolaevna Palyakhova, assistant professor of astronomy at Saint Petersburg State University, Russia	MPC · 4619
4620 Bickley	1978 OK	Named for the present site (since 1966) of the Perth Observatory. In 1915 the locality, in the Darling Range 23 km east-southeast of the center of the city, was officially named for Samuel Wallace Alexander Walsh Bickley (1810–1876), a pioneer in the area who was also a successful merchant and a nominated member of the Legislative Council of the colony (as it was at that time) of Western Australia	JPL · 4620
4621 Tambov	1979 QE_{10}	Tambov, Russia	MPC · 4621
4622 Solovjova	1979 WE_{2}	Sergey Solovyov (1820–1879), Russian historian, and his son Vladimir Solovyov, philosopher	MPC · 4622
4623 Obraztsova	1981 UT_{15}	Elena Obraztsova, Russian singer	MPC · 4623
4624 Stefani	1982 FV_{2}	J. Stefani Salazar, granddaughter of the first discoverer	MPC · 4624
4625 Shchedrin	1982 UG_{6}	Rodion Konstantinovich Shchedrin, Russian composer	MPC · 4625
4626 Plisetskaya	1984 YU_{1}	Maya Plisetskaya, Russian ballerina, wife of Rodion Konstantinovich Shchedrin	MPC · 4626
4627 Pinomogavero	1985 RT_{2}	Giuseppe Mogavero (born 1954), Italian medical doctor in Isnello, Palermo.	JPL · 4627
4628 Laplace	1986 RU_{4}	Pierre-Simon Marquis de Laplace, French mathematician and astronomer	MPC · 4628
4629 Walford	1986 TD_{7}	Roy Walford (1924–2004), professor of pathology at the UCLA School of Medicine in California	MPC · 4629
4630 Chaonis	1987 WA	Italian comune of Chions in northern Italy, location of the Chaonis Observatory (Italian: Osservatorio di Chions)	MPC · 4630
4631 Yabu	1987 WE_{1}	Yasuo Yabu (born 1932), Japanese amateur astronomer	MPC · 4631
4632 Udagawa	1987 YB	Tetsuo Udagawa (born 1947) developer of a laser holographic system for precise measurements	MPC · 4632
4633 Marinbica	1988 AJ_{5}	Marin Dacian Bica (1970–2013), Romanian professor of physics and astronomy	JPL · 4633
4634 Shibuya	1988 BA	Shibuya, Tokyo, Japan	MPC · 4634
4635 Rimbaud	1988 BJ_{1}	Arthur Rimbaud, French poet	MPC · 4635
4636 Chile	1988 CJ_{5}	Chile, South American country and location of the European Southern Observatory	MPC · 4636
4637 Odorico	1989 CT	Odorico Mattiussi (1265–1331), Italian Franciscan friar and missionary	MPC · 4637
4638 Estens	1989 EG	John Locke Estens (born 1919), Australian astronomy educator	MPC · 4638
4639 Minox	1989 EK_{2}	Minox, a miniature camera	MPC · 4639
4640 Hara	1989 GA	Megumi Hara, Japanese amateur astronomer	MPC · 4640
4641 Ayako	1990 QT_{3}	Ayako Endate (b.~1971) is the wife of Japanese astronomer Kin Endate, who co-discovered this minor planet	JPL · 4641
4642 Murchie	1990 QG_{4}	Scott L. Murchie (born 1959), of the Applied Physics Laboratory of Johns Hopkins University and contributor to the NEAR Shoemaker mission	MPC · 4642
4643 Cisneros	1990 QD_{6}	Ernest Cisneros (born 1964), one of the unsung heroes of planetary science. Cisneros began his career as a field geologist but has turned his energies to computer system management, software development, networking and data processing. Throughout the flight portion of the NEAR mission, Ernest insured that key hardware and software elements were developed and implemented. During the flybys of (253) Mathilde and (433) Eros (as well as the earth), Ernest worked with the science team delivering calibrated data within minutes of telemetry arrival for both optical navigation and science analysis. Name proposed by J. Veverka and citation written by M. Robinson.	JPL · 4643
4644 Oumu	1990 SR_{3}	Ōmu, Hokkaidō, Japan	MPC · 4644
4645 Tentaikojo	1990 SP_{4}	Astronomical museum at Sapporo, Japan. Meaning "Star Factory"	MPC · 4645
4646 Kwee	4009 P-L	Kiem Keng Kwee (1927-2023), a Dutch-Indonesian astronomer at Leiden Observatory, who studies variable stars, using their lightcurves to determine the characteristics of those systems by means of the Wilson-Devinney program. While observing at Palomar in 1963, he co-discovered comet 59P/Kearns–Kwee.	MPC · 4646
4647 Syuji	1931 TU_{1}	Shuji Hayakawa (born 1958), Japanese astronomer	MPC · 4647
4648 Tirion	1931 UE	Wil Tirion (born 1943), Dutch astronomical cartographer	MPC · 4648
4649 Sumoto	1936 YD	Sumoto, Hyōgo, city in Japan	MPC · 4649
4650 Mori	1950 TF	Kiyoshi Mori, Japanese amateur astronomer	MPC · 4650
4651 Wongkwancheng	1957 UK_{1}	Kwan-cheng Wong (1907–1986), a leader in Chinese industrial and commercial circles	JPL · 4651
4652 Iannini	1975 QO	Gualberto Mario Iannini (1917–), Argentinean astronomer who has worked in the field of astrometry for almost 40 years. As a student, Iannini studied the orbit of C/1942 C1 (Whipple-Bernasconi-Kulin). In 1962 he joined the faculty of the School of Mathematics, Astronomy and Physics of the National University of Cordoba and became head of the Department of Astrometry of the Cordoba Observatory, where he finished the reduction of the meridian circle catalogue of the Southern Polar Cap, known as the Cordoba E catalogue.	JPL · 4652
4653 Tommaso	1976 GJ_{2}	Tommaso Campanella (1568–1639), Italian Dominican friar, philosopher, poet and political figure	MPC · 4653
4654 Gorʹkavyj	1977 RJ_{6}	Nikolaj Nikolaevich Gorʹkavyj (born 1959), staff member of the Crimean Astrophysical Observatory	MPC · 4654
4655 Marjoriika	1978 RS	Marjo Riika Kuusela (born 1964), scholar in Russian literature	MPC · 4655
4656 Huchra	1978 VZ_{3}	John Huchra (1948–2010), an American astronomer and professor of cosmology at Harvard and known for the discovery of the Great Wall	JPL · 4656
4657 Lopez	1979 SU_{9}	Álvaro López-García (born 1941), professor of astronomy at Valencia University, director of the Valencia University Observatory	MPC · 4657
4658 Gavrilov	1979 SO_{11}	Aleksej Evgenievich Gavrilov, Ukrainian architect of bridges and director of the "Kievinterproekt" Institute of the International Academy of Architecture; friend of the discoverer, Nikolai Chernykh	MPC · 4658
4659 Roddenberry	1981 EP_{20}	Eugene Wesley (Gene) Roddenberry, American creator of Star Trek	MPC · 4659
4660 Nereus	1982 DB	Nereus, a Titan. The name was chosen following a competition organized by the Planetary Society	MPC · 4660
4661 Yebes	1982 WM	Yebes, a Spanish village in the Alcarria region, beautifully described by the Spanish Nobel laureate Camilo José Cela in one of his early books.	JPL · 4661
4662 Runk	1984 HL	Ferdinand Runk (1764–1834), German-Austrian landscape painter	JPL · 4662
4663 Falta	1984 SM_{1}	Josef Falta (1786–1847), an engineer and cartographer of the Schwarzenberg court in Český Krumlov, Czech Republic	JPL · 4663
4664 Hanner	1985 PJ	Martha S. Hanner, American planetary scientist at JPL	MPC · 4664
4665 Muinonen	1985 TZ_{1}	Karri O. Muinonen, Finnish planetary scientist at the Lowell Observatory	MPC · 4665
4666 Dietz	1986 JA_{1}	Robert S. Dietz (1914–1995), American geologist, pioneering researcher discoverer of terrestrial impact craters	MPC · 4666
4667 Robbiesh	1986 VC	Hans-Christian Robert (Robbie) Wade Schmidt-Harms (born 1986), stepson of the discoverer Robert H. McNaught and son of Soo Tan (see 4699 Sootan)	MPC · 4667
4668 Rayjay	1987 DX_{5}	Sri Lankan-born and raised Ray Jayawardhana (born 1971), known as "RayJay", an astronomer at the University of Toronto, and an award-winning science writer	JPL · 4668
4669 Høder	1987 UF_{1}	Høder, Norse god	MPC · 4669
4670 Yoshinogawa	1987 YJ	Yoshino River, Japan	MPC · 4670
4671 Drtikol	1988 AK_{1}	František Drtikol, Czech photographer	MPC · 4671
4672 Takuboku	1988 HB	Takuboku Ishikawa, Japanese poet	MPC · 4672
4673 Bortle	1988 LF	John E. Bortle, American amateur astronomer	MPC · 4673
4674 Pauling	1989 JC	Linus Carl Pauling, American chemist	MPC · 4674
4675 Ohboke	1990 SD	Oboke Gorge, in Japan. The valleys were formed by the Yoshino River, and are famous for their tinted autumn leaves.	MPC · 4675
4676 Uedaseiji	1990 SD_{4}	Seiji Ueda, Japanese amateur astronomer	MPC · 4676
4677 Hiroshi	1990 SQ_{4}	Hiroshi Kaneda, Japanese amateur astronomer	MPC · 4677
4678 Ninian	1990 SS_{4}	Ninian T. McNaught, father of the discoverer Robert H. McNaught	MPC · 4678
4679 Sybil	1990 TR_{4}	Sybil McNaught, mother of the discoverer Robert H. McNaught	MPC · 4679
4680 Lohrmann	1937 QC	Wilhelm Gotthelf Lohrmann, German geodesist and selenographer	MPC · 4680
4681 Ermak	1969 TC_{2}	Yermak Timofeyevich, a Cossack who started the Russian conquest of Siberia	MPC · 4681
4682 Bykov	1973 SO_{4}	Leonid Bykov, Soviet-Ukrainian actor and film director	MPC · 4682
4683 Veratar	1976 GJ_{1}	Vera Petrovna Tarashchuk, an astrophysicist at the Astronomical Observatory of Kyiv University	MPC · 4683
4684 Bendjoya	1978 GJ	Philippe Bendjoya, French astronomer at the Nice Observatory in southeast France	MPC · 4684
4685 Karetnikov	1978 SP_{6}	Valentin Grigor'evich Karetnikov (born 1938), astronomer, professor at Odessa University and director of its observatory	MPC · 4685
4686 Maisica	1979 SX_{2}	Maria Luisa Grima Garcia, founder and curator of a small home museum in Spain	MPC · 4686
4687 Brunsandrej	1979 SJ_{11}	Andrej Vladimirovich Bruns (born 1931), Soviet astronomer and instrument designer at the Crimean Astrophysical Observatory	MPC · 4687
4689 Donn	1980 YB	Bertram D. Donn, American astronomer	MPC · 4689
4690 Strasbourg	1983 AJ	Strasbourg, France	MPC · 4690
4691 Toyen	1983 TU	Toyen (Marie Čermínová), Czech photographer	MPC · 4691
4692 SIMBAD	1983 VM_{7}	SIMBAD, the astronomical database at Strasbourg	MPC · 4692
4693 Drummond	1983 WH	Jack D. Drummond, American astronomer at Steward Observatory	MPC · 4693
4694 Festou	1985 PM	Michel C. Festou, French astronomer at Midi-Pyrenees Observatory, Toulouse, France	MPC · 4694
4695 Mediolanum	1985 RU_{3}	Milan, city in northern Italy and capital of Lombardy (Mediolanum is its Latin name)	JPL · 4695
4696 Arpigny	1985 TP	Claude Arpigny, Belgian astronomer and cometary spectroscopist at the University of Liège	MPC · 4696
4697 Novara	1986 QO	Novara, a city in the Piedmont region in northwest Italy	JPL · 4697
4698 Jizera	1986 RO_{1}	Jizera River, Czech Republic	MPC · 4698
4699 Sootan	1986 VE	Soo Hoay Tan (born 1956), high-school science teacher and partner of the discoverer Robert H. McNaught	MPC · 4699
4700 Carusi	1986 VV_{6}	Andrea Carusi, Italian astronomer at the National Institute for Astrophysics (Istituto di Astrofisica Spaziale)	MPC · 4700

== 4701–4800 ==
back to top

Named minor planet	Provisional	This minor planet was named for...	Ref · Catalog
4701 Milani	1986 VW_{6}	Andrea Milani, Italian astronomer	MPC · 4701
4702 Berounka	1987 HW	Berounka River, Czech Republic	MPC · 4702
4703 Kagoshima	1988 BL	Kagoshima, Kagoshima, Japan	MPC · 4703
4704 Sheena	1988 BE_{5}	Sheena Fleming Phillips (born 1952), sister of the discoverer Robert H. McNaught	MPC · 4704
4705 Secchi	1988 CK	Angelo Secchi, Italian astronomer and spectroscopist	MPC · 4705
4706 Dennisreuter	1988 DR	Dennis C. Reuter (born 1952), of NASA Goddard Space Flight Center, co-investigator with NASA's Pluto-Kuiper Belt Mission	MPC · 4706
4707 Khryses	1988 PY	Khryses, priest of Apollo	MPC · 4707
4708 Polydoros	1988 RT	Polydorus, Trojan prince	MPC · 4708
4709 Ennomos	1988 TU_{2}	Ennomos, mythical person related to Trojan War	MPC · 4709
4710 Wade	1989 AX_{2}	Wade Richard Butler (born 1949), a friend of the discoverer Robert H. McNaught	MPC · 4710
4711 Kathy	1989 KD	Kathleen Garnette Moeller, daughter of the discoverer Henry E. Holt	MPC · 4711
4712 Iwaizumi	1989 QE	Iwaizumi, Iwate, Japan	MPC · 4712
4713 Steel	1989 QL	Duncan Steel (born 1955), British astronomer	MPC · 4713
4714 Toyohiro	1989 SH	Toyohiro Akiyama, Japanese cosmonaut	MPC · 4714
4715 Medesicaste	1989 TS_{1}	Medesicaste was a daughter of Priam who was married to Imbrius.	IAU · 4715
4716 Urey	1989 UL_{5}	Harold Urey (1893–1981), American physicist and Nobel laureate	MPC · 4716
4717 Kaneko	1989 WX	Isao Kaneko (1918–), Japanese astronomical educator	MPC · 4717
4718 Araki	1990 VP_{3}	Chikara Araki (born 1946), Japanese astronomical photographer	MPC · 4718
4719 Burnaby	1990 WT_{2}	Burnaby, British Columbia, Canada	MPC · 4719
4720 Tottori	1990 YG	Tottori, city in Japan	MPC · 4720
4721 Atahualpa	4239 T-2	Atahualpa, Inca ruler	MPC · 4721
4722 Agelaos	4271 T-3	Agelaus, mythical person related to Trojan War	MPC · 4722
4723 Wolfgangmattig	1937 TB	Wolfgang Mattig (1927--2018), German solar physicist and cosmologist	MPC · 4723
4724 Brocken	1961 BC	Brocken, mountain in Germany	MPC · 4724
4725 Milone	1975 YE	Eugene Milone, American/Canadian astronomer	MPC · 4725
4726 Federer	1976 SV_{10}	Charles A. Federer Jr., founder of Sky & Telescope	MPC · 4726
4727 Ravel	1979 UD_{1}	Joseph-Maurice Ravel, French composer	MPC · 4727
4728 Lyapidevskij	1979 VG	Anatoly Lyapidevsky, Soviet aviator and general	MPC · 4728
4729 Mikhailmilʹ	1980 RO_{2}	Mikhail Mil (1909–1970), Soviet scientist, aerospace engineer and designer of helicopters	MPC · 4729
4730 Xingmingzhou	1980 XZ	Xing-Ming Zhou (1965–2004), Chinese amateur astronomer	MPC · 4730
4731 Monicagrady	1981 EE_{9}	Monica Grady, head of petrology and meteoritics at the Natural History Museum in London	MPC · 4731
4732 Froeschlé	1981 JG	Claude and Christiane Froeschlé, French astronomers at Côte d'Azur Observatory	MPC · 4732
4733 ORO	1982 HB_{2}	Oak Ridge Observatory	MPC · 4733
4734 Rameau	1982 UQ_{3}	Jean-Philippe Rameau, French composer	MPC · 4734
4735 Gary	1983 AN	George Gary Shoemaker, manager of Meteor Crater Enterprises, Inc.	MPC · 4735
4736 Johnwood	1983 AF_{2}	John Armstead Wood, American planetary geologist and mineralogist	MPC · 4736
4737 Kiladze	1985 QO_{6}	Rolan Kiladze (1931–2010), Georgian astronomer	MPC · 4737
4738 Jimihendrix	1985 RZ_{4}	Jimi Hendrix (1942–1970), an American musician	JPL · 4738
4739 Tomahrens	1985 TH_{1}	Thomas J Ahrens, American geophysicist	MPC · 4739
4740 Veniamina	1985 UV_{4}	Veniamin Vasil'evich Somov, brother of the discoverer	MPC · 4740
4741 Leskov	1985 VP_{3}	Nikolay Leskov, Russian short story writer	MPC · 4741
4742 Caliumi	1986 WG	Ferdinando Caliumi (1914–1993), Italian amateur astronomer	MPC · 4742
4743 Kikuchi	1988 DA	Ryoko Kikuchi (born 1964), backup to first Japanese cosmonaut	MPC · 4743
4744 Rovereto	1988 RF_{5}	Rovereto, City of Peace, is an ancient town in Trentino-Alto Adige (Italy), where the local administration is very active in promoting culture and science	JPL · 4744
4745 Nancymarie	1989 NG_{1}	Nancy Marie Martinez, daughter of the discoverer Henry E. Holt	MPC · 4745
4746 Doi	1989 TP_{1}	Takao Doi, backup payload specialist	MPC · 4746
4747 Jujo	1989 WB	Jūjō Paper Industries, Japan	MPC · 4747
4748 Tokiwagozen	1989 WV	Tokiwagozen, mother of Minamoto no Yoshitsune	MPC · 4748
4749 Ledzeppelin	1989 WE_{1}	Led Zeppelin, a band from the UK whose nine albums (1969–1982) made them one of the most influential acts in rock history	JPL · 4749
4750 Mukai	1990 XC_{1}	Chiaki Mukai, backup payload specialist	MPC · 4750
4751 Alicemanning	1991 BG	Alice K. Manning, wife of the discoverer	MPC · 4751
4752 Myron	1309 T-2	Myron of Eleutherae, Ancient Greek (Athenian) sculptor	MPC · 4752
4753 Phidias	4059 T-3	Phidias, Ancient Greek sculptor	MPC · 4753
4754 Panthoos	5010 T-3	Panthoos, mythical person related to Trojan War	MPC · 4754
4755 Nicky	1931 TE_{4}	Nichole Tombaugh, granddaughter of the discoverer Clyde Tombaugh	MPC · 4755
4756 Asaramas	1950 HJ	Asociación Argentina Amigos de la Astronomía, an amateur astronomical association in Argentina	MPC · 4756
4757 Liselotte	1973 ST	Elizabeth Charlotte, Princess of the Palatinate (1652–1722), daughter of Count Palatine Karl Ludwig von der Pfalz	MPC · 4757
4758 Hermitage	1978 SN_{4}	Hermitage Museum in Saint Petersburg	MPC · 4758
4759 Åretta	1978 VG_{10}	Åretta, the name of a school situated in the Norwegian town of Lillehammer. The school was one of three winners of the Best School Teaching of Astronomy competition held during the 2009 Year of Astronomy in Norway.	JPL · 4759
4760 Jia-xiang	1981 GN_{1}	Zhang Jiaxiang (born 1932), Chinese astronomer at the Purple mountain observatory and a discoverer of minor planets	MPC · 4760
4761 Urrutia	1981 QC	Antonio Urrutia A., Chilean lawyer in Santiago	JPL · 4761
4762 Dobrynya	1982 SC_{6}	Dobrynya Nikitich, Russian epic hero	MPC · 4762
4763 Ride	1983 BM	Sally Ride, American astronaut	JPL · 4763
4764 Joneberhart	1983 CC	Jonathan Eberhart, American science writer for the magazine Science News	MPC · 4764
4765 Wasserburg	1986 JN_{1}	Gerald J. Wasserburg, American geologist and geophysicist	MPC · 4765
4766 Malin	1987 FF_{1}	David F. Malin, British-Australian astronomer and photographer	JPL · 4766
4767 Sutoku	1987 GC	Sutoku (1119–1164), the 75th emperor of Japan	JPL · 4767
4768 Hartley	1988 PH_{1}	Malcolm Hartley (born 1947), British-Australian discoverer of minor planets and comets. He's the deputy astronomer in charge of the UK Schmidt Telescope at Siding Spring Observatory. Among his discoveries are two Amor asteroids and ten comets, including eight with a short period (Src).	MPC · 4768
4769 Castalia	1989 PB	Castalia, Greek nymph	JPL · 4769
4770 Lane	1989 PC	Arthur Lonne Lane, a physical chemist and planetary scientist, manager of the geology and planetary section at the Jet Propulsion Laboratory	MPC · 4770
4771 Hayashi	1989 RM_{2}	Kohsuke Hayashi, Japanese astronomical educator	MPC · 4771
4772 Frankdrake	1989 VM	Frank Drake (1930–2022) is an American astronomer at the SETI Institute who pioneered the search for extraterrestrial intelligence and conducted the first SETI Search in 1960	JPL · 4772
4773 Hayakawa	1989 WF	Kazuo Hayakawa (1919–), Japanese mineralogist, petrologist and professor of engineering at Hokkaigakuen University in Sapporo	MPC · 4773
4774 Hobetsu	1991 CV_{1}	Hobetsu, town in Japan	MPC · 4774
4775 Hansen	1927 TC	Peter Andreas Hansen (1795–1874), Danish–German theoretical astronomer	MPC · 4775
4776 Luyi	1975 VD	Luyi County, China	MPC · 4776
4777 Aksenov	1976 SM_{2}	Evgenij Petrovich Aksenov (1933–1995), astronomer and director of the Sternberg Astronomical Institute in Moscow	MPC · 4777
4778 Fuss	1978 TV_{8}	Swiss Nicolas Fuss (1755–1825), Swiss mathematician who contributed to the development of mathematical education in Russia, and his son Pavel Fuss (1798–1855)	MPC · 4778
4779 Whitley	1978 XQ	Keith Whitley (1958–1989), American country music singer	MPC · 4779
4780 Polina	1979 HE_{5}	Polina Evgen'evna Zakharova, stellar astronomer and director of the Kourovka Astronomical Observatory of the Ural University	MPC · 4780
4781 Sládkovič	1980 TP	Andrej Sládkovič, Slovak poet	MPC · 4781
4782 Gembloux	1980 TH_{3}	Gembloux, Belgium	MPC · 4782
4783 Wasson	1983 AH_{1}	John T. Wasson, American cosmochemist and professor at the University of California at Los Angeles	MPC · 4783
4784 Samcarin	1984 DF_{1}	Samcarin is the Sanskrit word for wanderer	JPL · 4784
4785 Petrov	1984 YH_{1}	Andrei Pavlovich Petrov, Russian composer	MPC · 4785
4786 Tatianina	1985 PE_{2}	Tatiana Aleksandrovna Somova, friend of the discoverer Nikolai Chernykh	MPC · 4786
4787 Shulʹzhenko	1986 RC_{7}	Klavdiya Shulzhenko, Soviet singer of war and popular songs	MPC · 4787
4788 Simpson	1986 TL_{1}	Robert Simpson (1921–1997), English composer of symphonies and string quartets	MPC · 4788
4789 Sprattia	1987 UU_{2}	Christopher E. Spratt (born 1942), Canadian amateur astronomer and member of the Royal Astronomical Society of Canada (Src)	MPC · 4789
4790 Petrpravec	1988 PP	Petr Pravec, Czech astronomer	MPC · 4790
4791 Iphidamas	1988 PB_{1}	Iphidamas, mythical person related to Trojan War	MPC · 4791
4792 Lykaon	1988 RK_{1}	Lycaon, son of Priam the king of Troy	MPC · 4792
4793 Slessor	1988 RR_{4}	Mary Slessor (1848–1915), a Scottish missionary to Nigeria	JPL · 4793
4794 Bogard	1988 SO_{2}	Donald Bogard (born 1940), American meteoriticist at NASA's Johnson Space Center	MPC · 4794
4795 Kihara	1989 CB_{1}	Hideo Kihara (1911–1993), was a Japanese amateur astronomer and a founder of the Nayoro Astronomical Club	MPC · 4795
4796 Lewis	1989 LU	Joseph Walter Lewis Jr. and Anne Beech Lewis, friends of the discoverer	MPC · 4796
4797 Ako	1989 SJ	Akō, Hyōgo, Japan	MPC · 4797
4798 Mercator	1989 SU_{1}	Gerardus Mercator (Gerard De Kremer), Flemish cartographer	MPC · 4798
4799 Hirasawa	1989 TC_{1}	Yasuo Hirasawa, Japanese amateur astronomer	MPC · 4799
4800 Veveri	1989 TG_{17}	Veveri is a suburb of the Italian town of Novara. It is a crossroad for a historical man-made irrigation system, one of the most important in northern Italy, consisting of the Cavour, Quinto Sella and Regina Elena channels, with the Roggia Mora connection, that supports rice cultivations covering an extended region.	JPL · 4800

== 4801–4900 ==
back to top

Named minor planet	Provisional	This minor planet was named for...	Ref · Catalog
4801 Ohře	1989 UR_{4}	Ohře River, Czech Republic	MPC · 4801
4802 Khatchaturian	1989 UA_{7}	Aram Khachaturian (1903–1978), Georgian-Armenian-Russian composer	MPC · 4802
4803 Birkle	1989 XA	Kurt Birkle (1939–2010), German astronomer and discoverer of minor planets	MPC · 4803
4804 Pasteur	1989 XC_{1}	Louis Pasteur (1822–1895), French chemist and microbiologist	MPC · 4804
4805 Asteropaios	1990 VH_{7}	Asteropaios, Trojan hero from Greek mythology	MPC · 4805
4806 Miho	1990 YJ	Miho, a town of Shimizu-ku, Shizuoka, Japan	MPC · 4806
4807 Noboru	1991 AO	Noboru Yamada (1950–1989), Japanese alpinist	MPC · 4807
4808 Ballaero	1925 BA	Ball Aerospace and Technology Corporation has contributed to the scientific investigation of minor planets and comets through the development of instruments for the Hubble and Spitzer telescopes, the planned Widefield Infrared Survey Explorer and the spacecraft for the Deep Impact mission to comet 9P/Tempel	JPL · 4808
4809 Robertball	1928 RB	Robert Stawell Ball (1840–1913), a British mathematician and astronomer	JPL · 4809
4810 Ruslanova	1972 GL	Lidia Ruslanova (1900–1973), Russian folk singer	MPC · 4810
4811 Semashko	1973 SO_{3}	Nikolai Semashko (1874–1949), father of Soviet medicine	MPC · 4811
4812 Hakuhou	1977 DL_{3}	Hakuhō, Japanese unofficial Era name in lower half of 7th century	MPC · 4812
4813 Terebizh	1977 RR_{7}	Valerij Yuzefovich Terebizh (born 1941), theoretical astrophysicist and observer at the Crimean station of the Sternberg Astronomical Institute	MPC · 4813
4814 Casacci	1978 RW	Claudio Casacci (born 1958), Italian space scientist and discoverer of minor planets	MPC · 4814
4815 Anders	1981 EA_{28}	Edward Anders (born 1926), professor emeritus at the University of Chicago, has made many seminal contributions to the field of meteoritics. His work provided early evidence that meteorites are derived from minor planets rather than a larger fragmented planet and that meteoritic organics are of abiotic origin.	JPL · 4815
4816 Connelly	1981 PK	Robert Connelly (born 1942), American mathematician at Cornell University	MPC · 4816
4817 Gliba	1984 DC_{1}	George Gliba (born 1948), co-founder of the Chagrin Valley Astronomical Society.	JPL · 4817
4818 Elgar	1984 EM	Edward Elgar (1857–1934), British composer	MPC · 4818
4819 Gifford	1985 KC	Charles Gifford (1861–1948) published important papers on the impact origin of lunar craters. He established an observatory at Wellington College, which is now reopening as Gifford Observatory. Mt. Gifford and the Gifford Crack, in Fiordland, are named for his legendary exploits in tramping and photography	JPL · 4819
4820 Fay	1985 RZ	Fay Gillis Wells (1908–2002) an American pioneer aviator, globe-trotting journalist and guiding spirit of the Ninety-Nines, an international organization of women pilots	MPC · 4820
4821 Bianucci	1986 EE_{5}	Piero Bianucci, Italian science writer	MPC · 4821
4822 Karge	1986 TC_{1}	Orville B. Karge (1919–1990), American teacher of physics	JPL · 4822
4823 Libenice	1986 TO_{3}	Libenice, Czech archaeological site	MPC · 4823
4824 Stradonice	1986 WL_{1}	Stradonice, Czech Republic	MPC · 4824
4825 Ventura	1988 CS_{2}	Ventura, California	MPC · 4825
4826 Wilhelms	1988 JO	Don E. Wilhelms, American planetary geologist	MPC · 4826
4827 Dares	1988 QE	Dares, mythical person related to Trojan War	MPC · 4827
4828 Misenus	1988 RV	Misenus, mythical Trojan warrior	MPC · 4828
4829 Sergestus	1988 RM_{1}	Sergestus, mythical Trojan	MPC · 4829
4830 Thomascooley	1988 RG_{4}	Thomas Benton Cooley, an American hematologist and professor of hygiene and medicine at the University of Michigan and Wayne State University	MPC · 4830
4831 Baldwin	1988 RX_{11}	Through his pioneering work on the impact origins of lunar craters, Ralph Baldwin (born 1912) recognized the importance of impacts in the moon's geologic history. Baldwin's contributions to lunar science were published in his books The Face of the Moon (1949) and The Measure of the Moon (1963)	JPL · 4831
4832 Palinurus	1988 TU_{1}	Palinurus, mythical Trojan	MPC · 4832
4833 Meges	1989 AL_{2}	Mégês Phyleïdês, mythical Greek warrior	MPC · 4833
4834 Thoas	1989 AM_{2}	Thoas, mythical person related to Trojan War	MPC · 4834
4835 Asaeus	1989 BQ	Asaeus, from Greek mythology. During the Trojan War, he was the first Greek warrior to be slayed by Hector in the battle at the gates of Troy.	IAU · 4835
4836 Medon	1989 CK_{1}	Medôn, mythical Greek warrior	MPC · 4836
4837 Bickerton	1989 ME	Alexander W. Bickerton (1842–1929), professor of chemistry at Canterbury College, was an inspiring teacher and popularizer of science. Ernest Rutherford was one of his distinguished pupils. Bickerton was known for his "partial impact" theory of novae, which he extended to variable stars and other phenomena.	JPL · 4837
4838 Billmclaughlin	1989 NJ	William I. McLaughlin (born 1935), American astronomer and space scientist formerly of the Jet Propulsion Laboratory	MPC · 4838
4839 Daisetsuzan	1989 QG	Daisetsuzan Volcanic Group, Japan	MPC · 4839
4840 Otaynang	1989 UY	Hanne Otaynang (born 1935), who appealed for the environmental preservation of the earth at the 1992 Earth Summit in Brazil	MPC · 4840
4841 Manjiro	1989 UO_{3}	Nakahama Manjirō (1827–1898), Japanese traveler	MPC · 4841
4842 Atsushi	1989 WK	Atsushi Takahashi (born 1965), Japanese amateur astronomer and discoverer of minor planets	MPC · 4842
4843 Mégantic	1990 DR_{4}	Mont Mégantic, observatory in Québec	MPC · 4843
4844 Matsuyama	1991 BA_{2}	Masanori Matsuyama (born 1950), Japanese amateur astronomer and discoverer of minor planets	MPC · 4844
4845 Tsubetsu	1991 EC_{1}	The Japanese town of Tsubetsu on the island of Hokkaidō	MPC · 4845
4846 Tuthmosis	6575 P-L	Thutmose, pharaoh	MPC · 4846
4847 Amenhotep	6787 P-L	Amenhotep IV, pharaoh	MPC · 4847
4848 Tutenchamun	3233 T-2	Tutankhamun, pharaoh	MPC · 4848
4849 Ardenne	1936 QV	Manfred von Ardenne (1907–1997), German inventor and researcher	MPC · 4849
4850 Palestrina	1973 UJ_{5}	Giovanni Pierluigi da Palestrina (c. 1525–1594), Italian composer	MPC · 4850
4851 Vodopʹyanova	1976 US_{1}	Galina Petrovna Vodopʹyanova (born 1939), a surgeon of the Russian Academy of Sciences Hospital in St Petersburg	MPC · 4851
4852 Pamjones	1977 JD	Pamela Ann Jones of the Lunar and Planetary Institute in Houston, Texas	MPC · 4852
4853 Marielukac	1979 ML	Marie R. Lukac (born 1947), Staff member, US Naval Observatory	MPC · 4853
4854 Edscott	1981 ED_{27}	Edward Scott (born 1947), professor at the University of Hawaii	JPL · 4854
4855 Tenpyou	1982 VM_{5}	Tenpyō, Japanese Era name from 729 through 749	MPC · 4855
4856 Seaborg	1983 LJ	Glenn T. Seaborg (1912–1999), American atomic scientist	MPC · 4856
4857 Altgamia	1984 FM	Andrew L. T. and Angela Maria Chiarappa Green, son and wife of D. W. E. Green, who was involved in taking the discovery films and who found the identifications for this minor planet	MPC · 4857
4858 Vorobjov	1985 UA	Tomáš Vorobjov (born 1984), Slovak amateur astronomer and discoverer of minor planets	JPL · 4858
4859 Fraknoi	1986 TJ_{2}	Andrew Fraknoi (born 1948), American astronomer and author	MPC · 4859
4860 Gubbio	1987 EP	Gubbio in Italy, site of the iridium anomaly of the K-T extinction boundary	MPC · 4860
4861 Nemirovskij	1987 QU_{10}	Lev Ruful'evich Nemirovskij (born 1937), Russian engineer	MPC · 4861
4862 Loke	1987 SJ_{5}	Loki (Loke), Norse god of mischief	MPC · 4862
4863 Yasutani	1987 VH_{1}	Keiki Yasutani (born 1958), Japanese astronomical photographer	MPC · 4863
4864 Nimoy	1988 RA_{5}	Leonard Nimoy (1931–2015), American actor, film director and poet JPL	MPC · 4864
4865 Sor	1988 UJ	Fernando Sor (1778–1839), Spanish classical guitar composer	MPC · 4865
4866 Badillo	1988 VB_{3}	Victor L. Badillo (born 1930), Filipino Jesuit astronomer, former director of the Manila Observatory, president of the Philippine Astronomical Society from 1972 to 1990, and honorary director of the Astronomical League of the Philippines +	MPC · 4866
4867 Polites	1989 SZ	Polites, prince of Troy and son of king Priam, Greek mythology	MPC · 4867
4868 Knushevia	1989 UN_{2}	Kyiv (Kiev) National Taras Shevchenko University is the Ukrainian national center of higher education, science and progressive thinking. Since its founding in 1834 the university has played a great role for the development of education, science and culture in Ukraine	JPL · 4868
4869 Piotrovsky	1989 UE_{8}	Boris Piotrovsky (1908–1990), Russian orientalist, director of the Hermitage	MPC · 4869
4870 Shcherbanʹ	1989 UK_{8}	Vladimir Onufrievich Shcherbanʹ (born 1938), Russian engineer	MPC · 4870
4871 Riverside	1989 WH_{1}	The city of Riverside, California, to celebrate the 35th anniversary of its affiliation with its "sister city" of Sendai, Japan	MPC · 4871
4872 Grieg	1989 YH_{7}	Edvard Grieg (1843–1907), Norwegian composer	MPC · 4872
4873 Fukaya	1990 EC	Fukaya, Saitama, Japan	MPC · 4873
4874 Burke	1991 AW	James D. Burke (1925–2023), lunar settlement and exploration expert. He is known for being the first program manager of the Ranger Program, and advisor to the Planetary Society	MPC · 4874
4875 Ingalls	1991 DJ	Laura Ingalls Wilder (1867–1957), American author of the "Little House" series, and her family	MPC · 4875
4876 Strabo	1133 T-2	Strabo, Greek historian and geographer	MPC · 4876
4877 Humboldt	5066 T-2	Alexander von Humboldt (1769–1859), a Prussian geographer, naturalist and explorer	MPC · 4877
4878 Gilhutton	1968 OF	Ricardo Gil-Hutton (born 1958), Argentine astronomer and dynamicist, specialist in the collisional evolution of minor planets	JPL · 4878
4879 Zykina	1974 VG	Lyudmila Zykina (1929–2009), Soviet singer of folk songs, the favourite singer of Leonid Brezhnev	MPC · 4879
4880 Tovstonogov	1975 TR_{4}	Georgy Tovstonogov (1915–1989), Russian director, after whom a major theatre in St Petersburg is named	MPC · 4880
4881 Robmackintosh	1975 XJ	Roberto Mackintosh (1971–2012) was the President of the Asociación Argentina Amigos de la Astronomia (2009–2012) and worked to better coordinate amateur and professional activities	JPL · 4881
4882 Divari	1977 QU_{2}	Nikolaj Borisovich Divari (1921–1993), Ukrainian astronomer and professor at the Odessa Polytechnical Institute	MPC · 4882
4883 Korolirina	1978 RJ_{1}	Irina Leonidovna Korol', a friend of the discoverer Nikolai Chernykh	MPC · 4883
4884 Bragaria	1979 OK_{15}	Luka Fedorovich Bragar' (born 1938), a senior lecturer on the staff of Tiraspol Pedagogical Institute (Moldova).	JPL · 4884
4885 Grange	1980 LU	Alice Shoemaker Grange (born 1908), aunt of Eugene Shoemaker	MPC · 4885
4886 Kojima	1981 EZ_{14}	Hideyasu Kojima (born 1951), the curator of the Japanese Antarctic meteorite collection at the National Institute of Polar Research in Tokyo.	JPL · 4886
4887 Takihiroi	1981 EV_{26}	Takahiro (Taki) Hiroi (born 1960), a researcher in the department of geological sciences at Brown University.	JPL · 4887
4888 Doreen	1981 JX_{1}	Doreen Vingness Spellmann, sister-in-law of the discoverer Carolyn Shoemaker	MPC · 4888
4889 Praetorius	1982 UW_{3}	Michael Praetorius (1571–1621), German composer	MPC · 4889
4890 Shikanosima	1982 VE_{4}	Shikanosima, island in Japan	MPC · 4890
4891 Blaga	1984 GR	Blaga Dimitrova, Bulgarian poet, novelist and translator	MPC · 4891
4892 Chrispollas	1985 TV_{2}	Christian Pollas (born 1947), a French astronomer and discoverer of minor planets	MPC · 4892
4893 Seitter	1986 PT_{4}	Waltraut Seitter, German astronomer	MPC · 4893
4894 Ask	1986 RJ	Ask, the first man, in Norse mythology	MPC · 4894
4895 Embla	1986 TK_{4}	Embla, the first woman, in Norse mythology	MPC · 4895
4896 Tomoegozen	1986 YA	Tomoe Gozen (c. 1157–1247), Japanese female samurai	MPC · 4896
4897 Tomhamilton	1987 QD6	Thomas William Hamilton (born 1939) determined radar and fuel requirements for the Apollo Project. Later he taught astronomy, wrote shows for programmable planetaria, and trained students to enter the planetarium field.	JPL · 4897
4898 Nishiizumi	1988 FJ	Kunihiko Nishiizumi, Japanese nuclear chemist at the University of California at Berkeley	MPC · 4898
4899 Candace	1988 JU	Candace P. Kohl, American chemist and investigator of ancient solar activity	MPC · 4899
4900 Maymelou	1988 ME	Mayme Lou "Stevey" Stevens Bruce, together with her husband, wrote books about their travels, enthusiastic supporter and spokesperson for solar system research	MPC · 4900

== 4901–5000 ==
back to top

Named minor planet	Provisional	This minor planet was named for...	Ref · Catalog
4901 Ó Briain	1988 VJ	Dara Ó Briain (born 1972), Irish comedian and astronomer	JPL · 4901
4902 Thessandrus	1989 AN_{2}	Thessandrus, mythical person related to Trojan War	MPC · 4902
4903 Ichikawa	1989 UD	Kiyotaka (or Seikou) Ichikawa, Japanese amateur astronomer	MPC · 4903
4904 Makio	1989 WZ	Makio Akiyama (born 1950), Japanese astronomer and discoverer of minor planets	MPC · 4904
4905 Hiromi	1991 JM_{1}	Hiromi Takahashi, wife of one of the discoverers	MPC · 4905
4906 Seneferu	2533 P-L	Sneferu (c. 2613–2589 BC), ancient Egyptian king, founder of the 4th dynasty and builder of pyramids	MPC · 4906
4907 Zoser	7618 P-L	Djoser (Zoser) ancient Egyptian pharaoh of the 3rd dynasty (2630 BC – 2611 BC)	MPC · 4907
4908 Ward	1933 SD	Steven Ward, electronics technician at the Harvard-Smithsonian Center for Astrophysics	MPC · 4908
4909 Couteau	1949 SA_{1}	Paul Couteau, French astronomer and observer of double-stars at Nice Observatory	MPC · 4909
4910 Kawasato	1953 PR	Nobuhiro Kawasato, Japanese amateur astronomer and discoverer of minor planets	MPC · 4910
4911 Rosenzweig	1953 UD	Jack Rosenzweig (1919–1994) and Marcelle Rosenzweig (1929–) "Pioneers of the Zone" in Puerto Ordaz, Venezuela	MPC · 4911
4912 Emilhaury	1953 VX_{1}	Emil Haury (1904–1992), American archaeologist	MPC · 4912
4913 Wangxuan	1965 SO	Wang Xuan (1937–2006), Chinese computer scientist	JPL · 4913
4914 Pardina	1969 GD	Elsa Gutierrez Rodriguez-Pardina (born 1921), Argentinian astronomer at the La Plata Observatory in Argentina	JPL · 4914
4915 Solzhenitsyn	1969 TJ_{2}	Aleksandr Solzhenitsyn (1918–2008), Russian writer and critic of the Soviet Union and communism	MPC · 4915
4916 Brumberg	1970 PS	Victor A. Brumberg (born 1933), Russian astronomer and former staff member at the Institute of Theoretical Astronomy	MPC · 4916
4917 Yurilvovia	1973 SC_{6}	Yurij Alekseevich L'vov (1932–1994), deputy director of the Institute of Biology and Biophysics at the Tomsk State University	MPC · 4917
4918 Rostropovich	1974 QU_{1}	Mstislav Rostropovich (1927–2007), a Russian cellist and conductor	MPC · 4918
4919 Vishnevskaya	1974 SR_{1}	Galina Vishnevskaya (1926–2012), Russian opera singer, wife of Mstislav Rostropovich (see above)	MPC · 4919
4920 Gromov	1978 PY_{2}	Mikhail Gromov (1899–1985), Russian aviator who set the world record for long-distance flight in 1934	JPL · 4920
4921 Volonté	1980 SJ	Gian Maria Volonté (1933–1994), Italian actor	MPC · 4921
4922 Leshin	1981 EH_{4}	Laurie A. Leshin (born 1965), a planetary geologist and director of Sciences and Exploration at Goddard Space Flight Center	MPC · 4922
4923 Clarke	1981 EO_{27}	Arthur C. Clarke (1917–2008), British-Sri Lankan science fiction author	MPC · 4923
4924 Hiltner	1981 EQ_{40}	W. Albert Hiltner (1914–1991), American astronomer	MPC · 4924
4925 Zhoushan	1981 XH_{2}	City of Zhoushan, in east China	MPC · 4925
4926 Smoktunovskij	1982 ST_{6}	Innokenty Smoktunovsky (1925–1994), Russian actor	MPC · 4926
4927 O'Connell	1982 UP_{2}	Daniel O'Connell (1775–1847), Irish politician	MPC · 4927
4928 Vermeer	1982 UG_{7}	Johannes Vermeer (1632–1675), Dutch painter	MPC · 4928
4929 Yamatai	1982 XV	Yamataikoku (Yamatai), region of ancient Japan	MPC · 4929
4930 Rephiltim	1983 AO_{2}	Rebecca Salyards (born 1988), Philip Salyards (born 1991) and Timothy Salyards (born 1995), children of American astronomer Stephen L. Salyards who discovered this minor planet	MPC · 4930
4931 Tomsk	1983 CN_{3}	Siberian city of Tomsk, Russia	MPC · 4931
4932 Texstapa	1984 EA_{1}	Texas Star Party, amateur astronomy gathering	MPC · 4932
4933 Tylerlinder	1984 EN_{1}	Tyler Linder (born 1986), an assiduous observer of minor planets at the Astronomical Research Institute	JPL · 4933
4934 Rhôneranger	1985 JJ	Randall Graham, wine producer	MPC · 4934
4935 Maslachkova	1985 PD_{2}	Iya Mikhailovna Maslachkova (1937–1996), Russian poet and teacher from St. Petersburg	MPC · 4935
4936 Butakov	1985 UY_{4}	Grigory Butakov (1820–1882), Russian admiral	MPC · 4936
4937 Lintott	1986 CL_{1}	Chris Lintott (born 1980), British astronomer and public educator, co-presenter since 2004 of the long-standing BBC monthly television program The Sky at Night	JPL · 4937
4938 Papadopoulos	1986 CQ_{1}	Christos Papadopoulos (1910–1992), a Johannesburg-based South African astrophotographer and star atlas compiler, published his three-volume True Visual Magnitude Photographic Star Atlas in 1979.	JPL · 4938
4939 Scovil	1986 QL_{1}	Charles E. Scovil (born 1928), an amateur astronomer and curator of the Stamford Observatory in Connecticut, United States	JPL · 4939
4940 Polenov	1986 QY_{4}	Vasily Polenov (1844–1927), Russian landscape painter	MPC · 4940
4941 Yahagi	1986 UA	Yahagi River, a river flows through Aichi, hometown of the discoverers	JPL · 4941
4942 Munroe	1987 DU_{6}	Randall Munroe (born 1984) is a former NASA roboticist and the author of xkcd, a popular webcomic various themes including science, mathematics technology and computer science	JPL · 4942
4943 Lac d'Orient	1987 OQ	Man-made lake in the Orient Forest Regional Natural Park (Lac de la Forêt d'Orient) in northern France	MPC · 4943
4944 Kozlovskij	1987 RP_{3}	Ivan Kozlovsky (1900–1993), Russian opera singer	MPC · 4944
4945 Ikenozenni	1987 SJ	Ikenozenni, second wife of Taira no Tadamori (1096–1153), Japanese samurai	MPC · 4945
4946 Askalaphus	1988 BW_{1}	Askalaphus (Ascalaphus), son of Ares, brother of Ialmenus, participant in the Trojan War	MPC · 4946
4947 Ninkasi	1988 TJ_{1}	Ninkasi, Sumerian goddess of wine and beer	MPC · 4947
4948 Hideonishimura	1988 VF_{1}	Hideo Nishimura (born 1949) observer of comets and discoverer of C/1994 N1 (Nakamura-Nishimura-Machholz) in 1965	JPL · 4948
4949 Akasofu	1988 WE	Syun-Ichi Akasofu (born 1930), Japanese professor of geophysics since 1964 at the University of Fairbanks, Alaska, where he served as director of the International Arctic Research Center (1998–2007) and his auroral work received national and international recognition	JPL · 4949
4950 House	1988 XO_{1}	R. C. House, novelist and journalist and editor of JPL's Universe	MPC · 4950
4951 Iwamoto	1990 BM	Masayuki Iwamoto (born 1954), Japanese amateur astronomer and discoverer of minor planets	MPC · 4951
4952 Kibeshigemaro	1990 FC_{1}	Shigemaro Kibe (1912–1990), Japanese amateur telescope maker and an observer of the Sun, planets and variable stars	MPC · 4952
4954 Eric	1990 SQ	Ancient Norse name, used for Scandinavian monarchs such as Erik the Red (c. 950–1003) and his son Leif Erikson (c. 970–1020), Eric IX (c. 1156–1160) king of Sweden, and Eric of Pomerania (1381–1459) king of Denmark, Norway and Sweden. Also named for Eric Dale Roman, son of discoverer Brian P. Roman	MPC · 4954
4955 Gold	1990 SF_{2}	Robert E. Gold (born 1943), of the Applied Physics Laboratory of Johns Hopkins University and contributor to the NEAR Shoemaker mission	MPC · 4955
4956 Noymer	1990 VG_{1}	Andrew J. Noymer (born 1971), American astronomer and discoverer of minor planets	MPC · 4956
4957 Brucemurray	1990 XJ	Bruce C. Murray (1931–2013), American planetary scientist, co-founder with Carl Sagan of the Planetary Society	MPC · 4957
4958 Wellnitz	1991 NT_{1}	Dennis D. Wellnitz (born 1951), American physicist, observer and instrument builder at the University of Maryland	MPC · 4958
4959 Niinoama	1991 PA_{1}	Taira no Tokiko (1126–1185), second wife of Taira no Kiyomori	MPC · 4959
4960 Mayo	4657 P-L	Mayo Greenberg (1922–2001), American-Dutch astrochemist and expert on cometary structure and composition †	MPC · 4960
4961 Timherder	1958 TH_{1}	Timothy Scott Herder (born 1955), American the deputy project manager of NASA's New Horizons-Pluto Kuiper Belt mission. As such, he has helped further the exploration of the planets.	JPL · 4961
4962 Vecherka	1973 TP	Vechernij Peterburg, newspaper in St. Petersburg, Russia, that frequently publishes astronomical information	MPC · 4962
4963 Kanroku	1977 DR_{1}	Kanroku (Gwalleuk), a 7th-century Korean Buddhist monk	MPC · 4963
4964 Kourovka	1979 OD_{15}	Kourovka astronomical observatory, near Kourovka, Russia	MPC · 4964
4965 Takeda	1981 EP_{28}	Hiroshi Takeda (born 1934), Japanese meteologist	MPC · 4965
4966 Edolsen	1981 EO_{34}	Edward John Olsen (1927–), American meteoriticist	MPC · 4966
4967 Glia	1983 CF_{1}	Latin for "glue". Glial cells provide support and protection for neurons in the central and peripheral nervous systems	MPC · 4967
4968 Suzamur	1986 PQ	Suzanne Moss Murray, friend of American astronomer Eleanor Helin who discovered this minor planet	MPC · 4968
4969 Lawrence	1986 TU	Kenneth J. Lawrence (born 1964), American astronomer, participant in Palomar Planet-Crossing Asteroid Survey, and a discoverer of minor planets	MPC · 4969
4970 Druyan	1988 VO_{2}	Ann Druyan (born 1949), American author and producer, wife of Carl Sagan	MPC · 4970
4971 Hoshinohiroba	1989 BY	Hoshinohiroba, Comet Observers Network in Japan	MPC · 4971
4972 Pachelbel	1989 UE_{7}	Johann Pachelbel (1653–1706), German composer and organist	MPC · 4972
4973 Showa	1990 FT	Manufacturer of telescopes in Japan	MPC · 4973
4974 Elford	1990 LA	W. Graham Elford (1926–), Australian astronomer, radar meteor researcher at the University of Adelaide and former president of IAU Commission 22	MPC · 4974
4975 Dohmoto	1990 SZ_{1}	Yoshio Dohmoto (1914- ), Japanese astronomer who directed the Asahikawa Observatory in Hokkaido	MPC · 4975
4976 Choukyongchol	1991 PM	Cho Gyeong-chul (1929–2010), Korean astronomer	MPC · 4976
4977 Rauthgundis	2018 P-L	Rauthgundis Seitz, friend of the discoverers	MPC · 4977
4978 Seitz	4069 T-2	Horstmar Seitz, friend of one of the discoverers	MPC · 4978
4979 Otawara	1949 PQ	Akira Otawara (born 1950), Japanese photo artist and writer	MPC · 4979
4980 Magomaev	1974 SP_{1}	Muslim Magomayev (1942–2008), a Soviet crooner and opera singer	MPC · 4980
4981 Sinyavskaya	1974 VS	Tamara Sinyavskaya (born 1943), Soviet opera singer, wife of Muslim Magomayev (see above)	MPC · 4981
4982 Bartini	1977 PE_{1}	Robert Ludvigovich Bartini (1897–1974), an Italian aircraft designer and researcher in aerodynamics, theoretical physics and cosmology. Active mostly in the Soviet Union, he was called "Barone Rosso" because of his noble descent.	MPC · 4982
4983 Schroeteria	1977 RD_{7}	Johann Hieronymus Schröter (1745–1816), German astronomer	MPC · 4983
4984 Patrickmiller	1978 VU_{10}	Patrick J. Miller (born 1949), professor of mathematics at Hardin-Simmons University in Abilene, TX	JPL · 4984
4985 Fitzsimmons	1979 QK_{4}	Alan Fitzsimmons (DOB n.a.), a British astronomer, professor of astronomy and a discoverer of minor planets (Src)	MPC · 4985
4986 Osipovia	1979 SL_{7}	Valery Ivanovich Osipov, Russian historian, archaeologist and linguist	MPC · 4986
4987 Flamsteed	1980 FH_{12}	John Flamsteed (1646–1719), first Astronomer Royal of England, known for the Flamsteed designation used in his star catalog Historia Coelestis Britannica	MPC · 4987
4988 Chushuho	1980 VU_{1}	David Chu Shu-ho (1950–2011), Hong Kong physical educator, promoter of the 2008 Olympic Games in Beijing	JPL · 4988
4989 Joegoldstein	1981 DX_{1}	Joseph I. Goldstein (1939–2015), American meteoriticist	MPC · 4989
4990 Trombka	1981 ET_{26}	Jacob Israel Trombka (born 1930), American physicist at NASA's Goddard Space Flight Center	MPC · 4990
4991 Hansuess	1981 EU_{29}	Hans Suess (1909–1993), Austrian-born American geochemist	MPC · 4991
4992 Kálmán	1982 UX_{10}	Emmerich Kálmán (1882–1953), Hungarian composer of operettas	MPC · 4992
4993 Cossard	1983 GR	Guido Cossard (born 1958), Italian archaeoastronomer	JPL · 4993
4994 Kisala	1983 RK_{3}	Rachel Kisala (born 1985), Physics and Astronomy Major, worked for Dr. Brian Marsden at the Minor Planet Center	MPC · 4994
4995 Griffin	1984 QR	Griffin Swanson, son of the discoverer	JPL · 4995
4996 Veisberg	1986 PX_{5}	Vladimir Grigoryevich Weisberg (1924–1985), Russian painter	MPC · 4996
4997 Ksana	1986 TM	Kseniya Andréevna Nessler, friend of Soviet astronomer Lyudmila Karachkina who discovered this minor planet	MPC · 4997
4998 Kabashima	1986 VG	Fujio Kabashima (born 1939), Japanese amateur astronomer	MPC · 4998
4999 MPC	1987 CJ	Minor Planet Circulars, astrometric observations published by the Minor Planet Center	MPC · 4999
5000 IAU	1987 QN_{7}	International Astronomical Union	MPC · 5000

back to top

Preceded by 3,001–4,000	Meanings of minor-planet names List of minor planets: 4,001–5,000	Succeeded by 5,001–6,000
