= 4789 Sprattia =

Stony background asteroid

Discovery
- Discovered by: D. D. Balam
- Discovery site: Climenhaga Obs.
- Discovery date: 20 October 1987

Designations
- Named after: Christopher E. Spratt (Canadian astronomer)
- Alternative designations: 1987 UU_{2} · 1976 HE_{1}
- Minor planet category: main-belt · (inner) background

Orbital characteristics
- Epoch 23 March 2018 (JD 2458200.5)
- Uncertainty parameter 0
- Observation arc: 41.82 yr (15,276 d)
- Aphelion: 2.5176 AU
- Perihelion: 1.9596 AU
- Semi-major axis: 2.2386 AU
- Eccentricity: 0.1246
- Orbital period (sidereal): 3.35 yr (1,223 d)
- Mean anomaly: 45.388°
- Mean motion: 0° 17^{m} 39.48^{s} / day
- Inclination: 1.2760°
- Longitude of ascending node: 209.73°
- Argument of perihelion: 152.92°

Physical characteristics
- Mean diameter: 3.54±0.42 km 4.172±0.232 km 4.22 km (calculated)
- Synodic rotation period: 3.136±0.0005 h
- Geometric albedo: 0.20 (assumed); 0.279±0.070; 0.44±0.13
- Spectral type: S (Pan-STARRS); S (SDSS-MOC)
- Absolute magnitude (H): 13.789±0.002 (R); 13.80; 13.9; 14.24; 14.24±0.22

4789 Sprattia, provisional designation 1987 UU_{2}, is a stony background asteroid from the inner regions of the asteroid belt, approximately 4 kilometers (2.5 miles) in diameter. It was discovered on 20 October 1987, by Canadian astronomer David Balam at the Climenhaga Observatory (657) in Victoria, Canada. The S-type asteroid has a rotation period of 3.1 hours and was named after Canadian amateur astronomer Christopher E. Spratt.

== Orbit and classification ==
Sprattia is a non-family asteroid from the main belt's background population. It orbits the Sun in the inner asteroid belt at a distance of 2.0–2.5 AU once every 3 years and 4 months (1,223 days; semi-major axis of 2.24 AU). Its orbit has an eccentricity of 0.12 and an inclination of 1° with respect to the ecliptic. The body's observation arc begins with its first observation as 1976 HE_{1} at the Félix Aguilar Observatory in April 1976, more than 11 years prior to its official discovery observation at Victoria.

== Physical characteristics ==
Sprattia has been characterized as a common, stony S-type asteroid by Pan-STARRS and the Sloan Digital Sky Survey.

=== Rotation period ===
In December 2011, a rotational lightcurve of Sprattia was obtained from photometric observations in the R-band by astronomers at the Palomar Transient Factory in California. Lightcurve analysis gave a rotation period of 3.136 hours with a brightness amplitude of 0.17 magnitude (U=2).

=== Diameter and albedo ===
According to the survey carried out by the NEOWISE mission of NASA's Wide-field Infrared Survey Explorer, Sprattia measures between 3.54 and 4.172 kilometers in diameter and its surface has an albedo between 0.28 and 0.44.

The Collaborative Asteroid Lightcurve Link assumes a standard albedo for a stony asteroid of 0.20, and calculates a diameter of 4.22 kilometers based on an absolute magnitude of 14.24.

== Naming ==
This minor planet was named after Canadian amateur astronomer Christopher E. Spratt (born 1942), a long-time member of the Royal Astronomical Society of Canada, whose interests involve comets, minor planets, meteors and variable stars. The official naming citation was published by the Minor Planet Center on 27 June 1991 (M.P.C. 18465).
