= Isobel Thompson =

British archaeologist

Academic background
- Education: University of London

Academic work
- Discipline: Archaeologist
- Institutions: honorary lecturer at UCL institute of Archaeology

Isobel Margaret Thompson is a British archaeologist. She obtained her PhD at the University of London and is now an honorary lecturer at the University College London's Institute of Archaeology, editor of Hertfordshire Archaeology and History, and researches the late Iron Age-Roman transition in southeast Britain. She is known for her research into the late Iron Age, and is an expert in grog-tempered pottery.

== Life and career ==
Thompson was awarded, earned her PhD at the University of London Institute of Archaeology, and her PhD thesis, Grog-tempered 'Belgic' Pottery of Southeastern England, was published in 1982.

In 1995 Thompson worked under Rosalind Niblett compiling the Saint Albans Urban Archaeological Database, and an academic assessment of the database was published later in 2005 titled Alban's Buried Towns: An Assessment of St Albans' Archaeology up to AD 1610.

Between 1998 and 2018 Thompson worked for Hertfordshire city council's archaeology team the Archaeology Section at Hertfordshire County Council. In 2018 she retired as Historic Environment Record Officer in order to focus on her research of the Iron Age Roman transition.

Thompson is a Fellow of the Society of Antiquaries.

In 1987 a minor planet was named 4210 Isobelthompson after her.

== Published works ==
=== Monographs ===
- Grog-tempered 'Belgic' Pottery of Southeastern England, 1982
- The Excavation of a Ceremonial Site at Folly Lane, Verulamium, contributing author, 1999
- Saint Albans Urban Archaeological Assessment, 2003
- Alban's Buried Towns: An Assessment of St Albans' Archaeology up to AD 1610, coauthored with Ros Niblett, 2005

=== Articles and chapters ===
- Weathampstead Revisited, 1978
- British Books on Archaeology, 1972-78, 1979
- A Belgic Cremation Burial Found at West Mersea, 1981
- Late Iron age Pottery and Briquetage from Elm Park House, Ardleigh, 1981
- The Study-Collections of the Institute of Archaeology List, 1987
- The Late Pre-Roman Iron Age Pottery, 2001
- The Prehistoric Pottery, 2005
- Harrow in the Roman Period, 2008
- Review of Archaeological Projects in Hertfordshite 1998-2005, 2008
