= Dominique Bockelée-Morvan =

French planetary scientist

Dominique Bockelée-Morvan (born 1957) is a French astrophysicist and planetary scientist specializing in the molecular composition of comets. She is a director of research for the French National Centre for Scientific Research (CNRS), affiliated with the Paris Observatory, and a former president of Commission 15 on the Physical Study of Comets & Minor Planets of the International Astronomical Union.

== Education and career ==
Bockelée-Morvan earned a doctorate in 1987 through Paris Diderot University, with the dissertation Les conditions d'excitation des molecules meres dans les atmospheres cometaires : applications a l'eau et a l'acide cyanhydrique, supervised by Jacques Crovisier.

She was president of Commission 15 on the Physical Study of Comets & Minor Planets of the International Astronomical Union, from 2012 to 2015.

== Research ==
Bockelée-Morvan brought the study of comets from a (literally) dusty backwater of planetary science into the mainstream. Through infrared and radio observations of comets, and the development of excitation models for cometary chemicals, she has found over 20 different molecular impurities in their ice. Her work found connections between the makeup of comets and of the interstellar medium, and with prebiotic chemistry. She has also helped explain the 3.4 μm-wavelength emissions of comets.

She has been a collaborator on the MIRO and VIRTIS experiments on the Rosetta space probe and its 2014 flyby study of comet 67P/Churyumov–Gerasimenko. Beyond comets, she has also contributed to the first discovery of water vapor on the asteroid Ceres.

== Recognition ==
Bockelée-Morvan was the 1991 winner of the Thorlet Prize of the French Academy of Sciences, for her studies of Halley's Comet. She won the young researcher prize of the Société Française d'Astronomie et d'Astrophysique (SF2A) in 1992.

She received the David Bates Medal of the European Geosciences Union in 2002, "for her exceptional observations and interpretations of the composition of comets". She received the CNRS Silver Medal in 2014.

Asteroid 4020 Dominique, discovered in 1981, was named after Bockelée-Morvan.

== Selected publications ==
- Bockelée-Morvan, D. (July 1987), "A model for the excitation of water in comets", Astronomy & Astrophysics, 181 (1): 169–181, Bibcode:1987A&A...181..169B
- Bockelée-Morvan, D.; Brooke, T. Y.; Crovisier, J. (July 1995), "On the origin of the 3.2- to 3.6-μm emission features in comets", Icarus, 116 (1): 18–39, Bibcode:1995Icar..116...18B, doi:10.1006/icar.1995.1111
- Bockelée-Morvan, D.; Gautier, D.; Lis, D.C.; Young, K.; Keene, J.; Phillips, T.; Owen, T.; Crovisier, J.; Goldsmith, P.F.; Bergin, E.A.; Despois, D.; Wootten, A. (May 1998), "Deuterated water in comet C/1996 B2 (Hyakutake) and its implications for the origin of comets" (PDF), Icarus, 133 (1): 147–162, Bibcode:1998Icar..133..147B, doi:10.1006/icar.1998.5916, S2CID 121830932
- Bockelée-Morvan, D.; Lis, D. C.; Wink, J. E.; Despois, D.; Crovisier, J.; Bachiller, R.; Benford, D. J.; Biver, N.; Colom, P.; Davies, J. K.; Gérard, E.; Germain, B.; Houde, M.; Mehringer, D.; Moreno, R.; Paubert, G.; Phillips, T. G.; Rauer, H. (January 2000), "New molecules found in comet C/1995 O1 (Hale-Bopp): Investigating the link between cometary and interstellar material", Astronomy & Astrophysics, 353: 1101–1114, Bibcode:2000A&A...353.1101B
- Bockelée-Morvan, D.; Gautier, D.; Hersant, F.; Huré, J.-M.; Robert, F. (March 2002), "Turbulent radial mixing in the solar nebula as the source of crystalline silicates in comets", Astronomy & Astrophysics, 384 (3): 1107–1118, Bibcode:2002A&A...384.1107B, doi:10.1051/0004-6361:20020086, S2CID 221311321
- Bockelée-Morvan, D.; Crovisier, J.; Mumma, M. J.; Weaver, H. A. (2004), "The composition of cometary volatiles" (PDF), in Festou, M.; Keller, H. U.; Weaver, Harold A. (eds.), Comets II, University of Arizona Press, pp. 391–424, Bibcode:2004come.book..391B, ISBN 978-0-8165-2450-1
- Küppers, Michael; O'Rourke, Laurence; Bockelée-Morvan, Dominique; Zakharov, Vladimir; Lee, Seungwon; von Allmen, Paul; Carry, Benoît; Teyssier, David; Marston, Anthony; Müller, Thomas; Crovisier, Jacques; Barucci, M. Antonietta; Moreno, Raphael (January 2014), "Localized sources of water vapour on the dwarf planet (1) Ceres", Nature, 505 (7484): 525–527, Bibcode:2014Natur.505..525K, doi:10.1038/nature12918, PMID 24451541, S2CID 4448395
- Bockelée-Morvan, D.; Biver, N. (May 2017), "The composition of cometary ices", Philosophical Transactions of the Royal Society A: Mathematical, Physical and Engineering Sciences, 375 (2097) 20160252, Bibcode:2017RSPTA.37560252B, doi:10.1098/rsta.2016.0252, PMID 28554972
