= Phoebe Waterman Haas Public Observatory =

- Named after: Phoebe Waterman Haas
- Location: Washington, D.C., United States
- Coordinates: 38°53′16″N 77°01′07″W
- Website: Phoebe Waterman Haas Public Observatory

Telescopes
- 16–inch cassegrain reflector
- 4–inch Sun Gun Telescope

Phoebe Waterman Haas Public Observatory with a 16–inch telescope is a U.S. public observatory located at the National Air and Space Museum in Washington, D.C.

== History ==
The observatory of the National Air and Space Museum was named for Phoebe Waterman Haas in recognition of a $6 million donation from the Thomas W. Haas Foundation, which established an endowment for the museum's Public Observatory Program. Thomas W. Haas is the son of Dorothy Haas and of F. Otto Haas, who was the son of Phoebe Haas and Otto Haas. The observatory opened in 2009 as part of the celebration of the International Year of Astronomy.

== Telescopes ==
The Phoebe Waterman Haas Public Observatory has a main telescope used during the nighttime, as well as a Sun Gun Telescope and other telescopes for observing the sun.

=== Main telescope ===
The observatory's main telescope is a 16–inch Boller & Chivens Cassegrain reflector, named the Cook Memorial Telescope in memory of Chester Sheldon Cook. Purchased in 1967 by the Harvard College Observatory, the telescope was used by generations of students at the Oak Ridge Observatory until it closed in 2005. The Cook Memorial Telescope is now on loan to the National Air and Space Museum for use in the observatory.

=== Sun Gun Telescope ===
The observatory's 4–inch Sun Gun Telescope is used for viewing the photosphere of the sun in the visible spectrum. There are also other instruments for viewing the hydrogen-alpha (red) and calcium-K (purple) light emitted by the chromosphere.

== Public access ==
The observatory is located on the National Air and Space Museum's east terrace and is open to the public Wednesdays through Sundays from noon to 3 P.M. and one night a month. It is closed during rainy weather. Visitors can use all the observatory's available telescopes with the help of the staff.

== Namesake ==
The woman for whom the observatory is named was an extraordinary figure of the early 20th century, a woman who loved astronomy and pursued it to a level reached by few women of her time. She was among the first women in the United States to achieve a PhD in astronomy. As a graduate student at the University of California, Berkeley, she made observations at the Lick Observatory near San Jose. She was perhaps the first woman to operate a major telescope, the Lick's 36-inch refractor. Waterman studied the spectra of Class A stars; her dissertation was the first to be published by a woman at Lick. She left academia after marrying Otto Haas, a Philadelphia businessman, but remained an active citizen scientist and leading member of the American Association of Variable Star Observers.

== Revitalization and transformation ==
In 2024, the observatory underwent a period of revitalization and transformation. It was expected to reopen in 2026.

== See also ==
- List of astronomical observatories
