= Jiaxiang =

Jiaxiang may refer to:

- Jiaxiang (家鄉), ancestral hometown of certain Chinese people or clan.
- Jizang (嘉祥; 549–623 CE), also known as Jiaxiang, a Chinese monk
- Jiaxiang County (嘉祥县), of Jining, Shandong, China
  - Jiaxiang Town (嘉祥镇), seat of Jiaxiang County
- 4760 Jia-xiang, main belt asteroid
- Jackson Hole, China, also known as Jiaxiang (transliteration)
