= Agassiz station =

Agassiz station may refer to:

- Agassiz station (British Columbia), a Canadian railway station
- George R. Agassiz Station, an American observatory
