= Phoebe Waterman Haas =

American astronomer

Emma Phoebe Waterman Haas
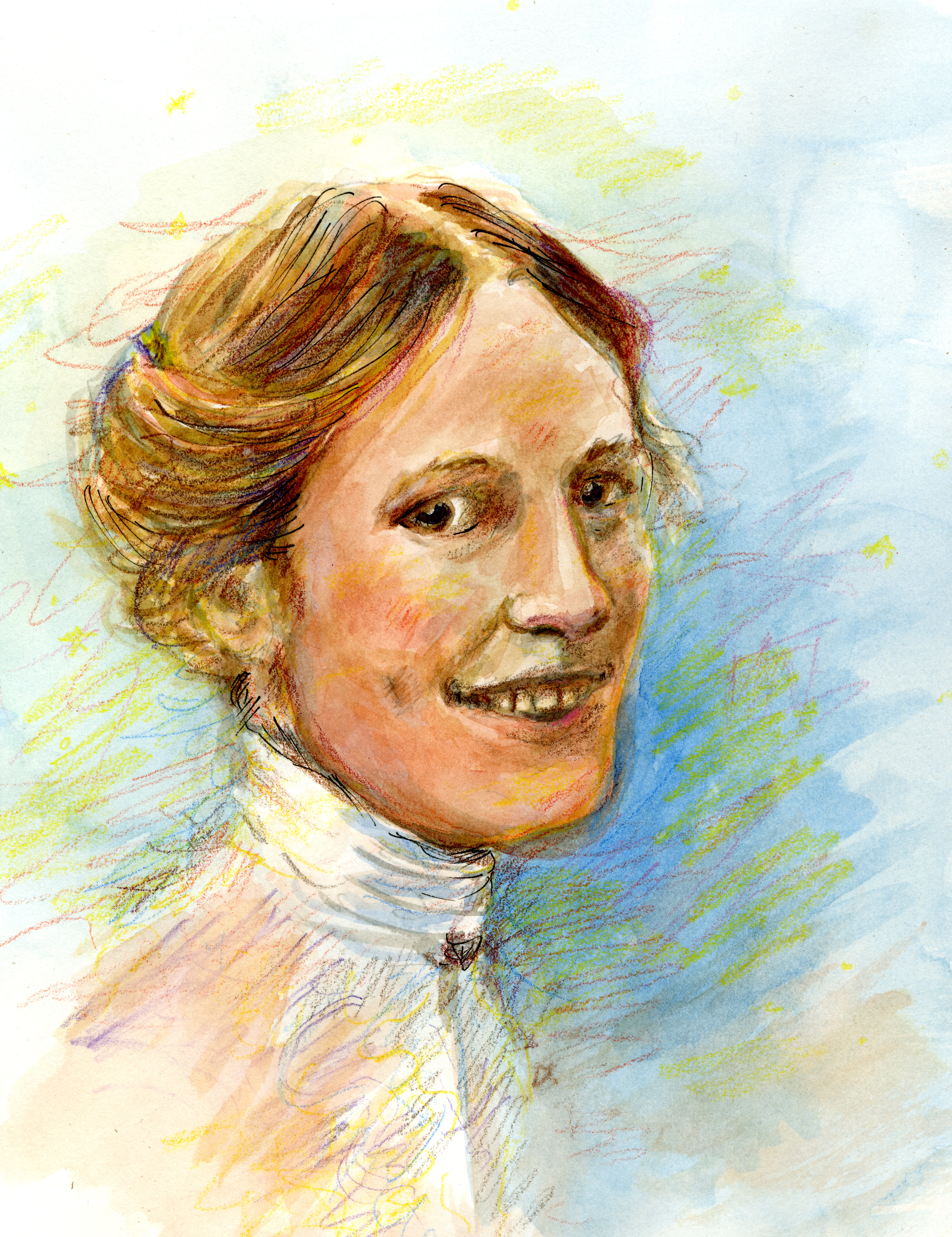
- Born: September 20, 1882; North Dakota, United States
- Died: May 16, 1967 (aged 84); Villanova, Pennsylvania
- Education: Vassar College (AB); University of California, Berkeley (PhD)
- Known for: work with American Association of Variable Star Observers
- Spouse: Otto Haas
- Children: Fritz Otto and John Charles
- Scientific career
- Fields: Astronomy
- Workplaces: Mount Wilson Observatory; Lick Observatory; Argentine National Observatory
- Thesis: The Visual Region of the Spectrum of the Brighter Class A Stars (1913)

Phoebe Waterman Haas (September 20, 1882 – May 16, 1967) was one of the earliest American women to be awarded a doctorate in astronomy (1913). While her formal professional career ended upon her marriage, she contributed as a citizen scientist, volunteering for the American Association of Variable Star Observers (AAVSO). The Phoebe Waterman Haas Public Observatory was supported by donations from her family and is named in her honor.

== Life ==
Phoebe Waterman Haas was born in North Dakota, United States, in 1882, as Emma Phoebe Waterman. Her father was John Charles Waterman. Initially taught at home by her parents, she later went to Grand Rapids, Michigan, to study at High School.

=== Education and early work ===
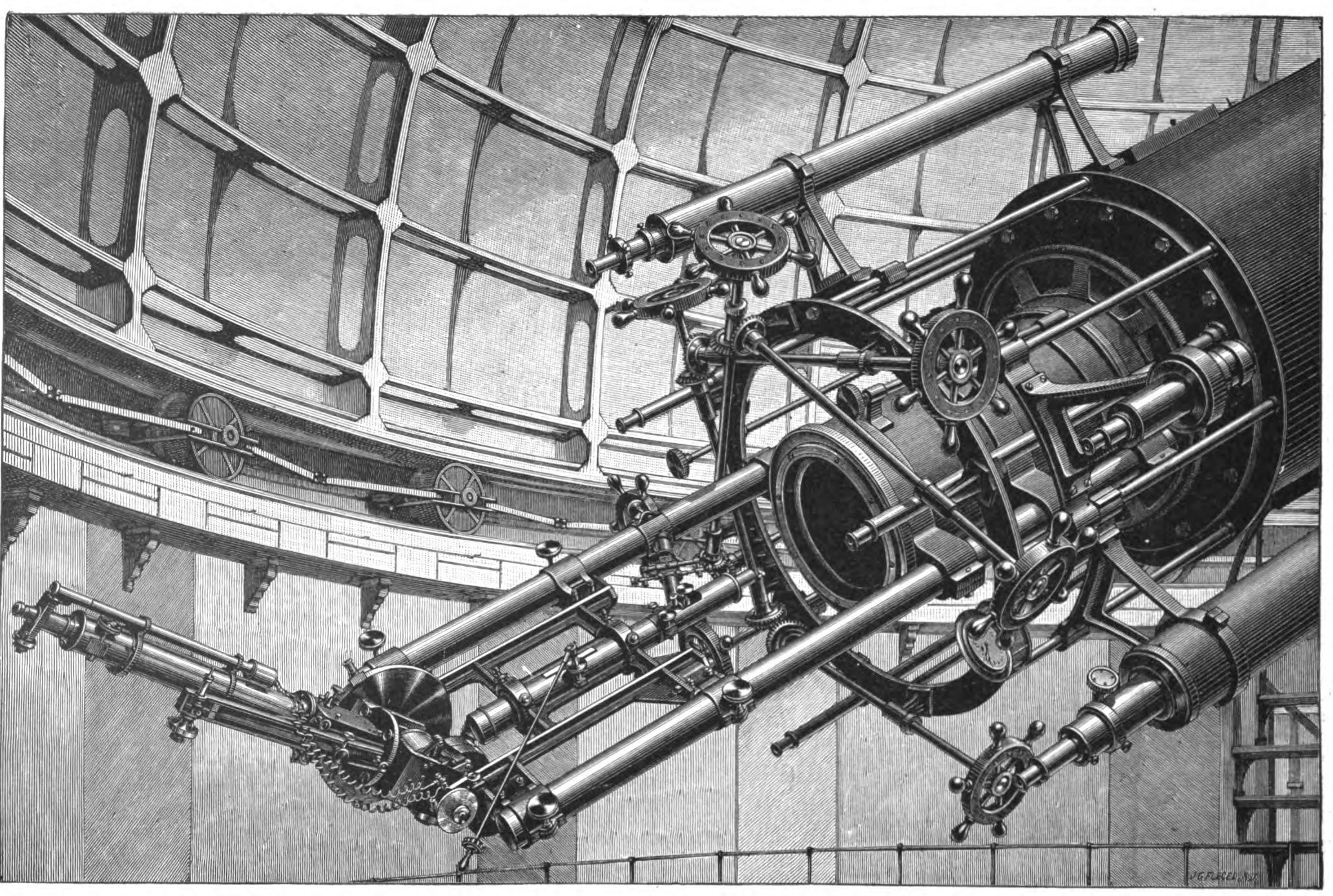
Star Spectroscope, Lick Observatory, constructed by Brashear, 1898

Phoebe Waterman moved from North Dakota to New York to study at Vassar College, a university for women, where she received an AB degree in 1904. Two years later she earned a master's degree in mathematics and astronomy, working with Caroline E. Furness.

At the time, the accepted way for a woman to be professionally involved in the field of astronomy was to be a "computer", performing data analysis and making calculations. As a computer at Mount Wilson Observatory from 1909 to 1911, Phoebe worked with leading astronomers such as George Ellery Hale, Walter S. Adams, Jacobus Kapteyn, and Harold D. Babcock. She was involved in classification and reduction of spectra and measurement of laboratory spectra. She also studied the rotation of the Sun.

Phoebe wanted to be a full professional research astronomer, making her own observations as well as doing analyses. In 1911 she applied to the University of California-Berkeley to a doctorate program. She was accepted and was able to make observations at Lick Observatory in San José, using the Brashear spectrograph on the 36-inch refractor for her research. She was awarded a doctorate of philosophy in Astronomy on May 14, 1913,. Her thesis title was "The Visual Region of the Spectrum of the Brighter Class A Stars." She was the first women in earn a doctorate in astronomy at the University of California, Berkeley. (Waterman's dissertation was published before that of her classmate, Anna Estelle Glancy, who was awarded her degree on the same day.)

=== Marriage ===
In 1913, Phoebe was appointed as an assistant to the Argentine National Observatory at Cordoba, Argentina. On the ship traveling to Buenos Aires she met chemist Otto Haas. They were married on February 22, 1914. They had two children: Fritz Otto and John C. Haas.

=== AAVSO work ===
For many years, Phoebe was an observer, volunteer and benefactor of the American Association of Variable Star Observers (AAVSO). The AAVSO, founded in 1911, was an organization which fostered collaboration between citizen scientists and professionals. John Crane willed his 4-inch Clark refractor to the AAVSO. After he died in 1927, Phoebe Waterman Haas was able to obtain it. She reported her observations of variable stars to the American Association of Variable Star Observers (AAVSO), submitting 338 observations from 1928 to 1933. She also taught her children and friends about astronomy.

In 1953, the AAVSO separated from Harvard College Observatory, losing both its physical location and much of its funding. Phoebe Waterman Haas volunteered to assist the AAVSO Director, Margaret Mayall. For the next eleven years, Haas provided vital support by calculating the five- or ten-day means for southern variable stars. Her data formed the basis for light curves published by AAVSO. She and her family also contributed financially in support of the AAVSO.

Phoebe Waterman Haas died in 1967.

== Legacy ==
In 1945, following World War II, Phoebe and Otto Haas created the Phoebe Waterman Foundation to help fatherless children and to support medical and educational institutions. Otto Haas himself had had to work at the age of 15 after the death of his father. The foundation was later renamed the William Penn Foundation.

The Rohm and Haas company yearly presents an award in Phoebe Haas' name. The Phoebe Waterman Haas Award is given to a woman, nominated by her peers, who demonstrates outstanding leadership and serves as role model inside and outside the company.

=== Phoebe Waterman Haas Public Observatory ===
The observatory of the National Air and Space Museum in Washington, D.C. was named the Phoebe Waterman Haas Public Observatory in recognition of a US$6 million donation from the Thomas W. Haas Foundation (founded by Phoebe's grandson) to establish an endowment for the museum's Public Observatory Program.

== See also ==
- Phoebe Waterman Haas Public Observatory
- National Air and Space Museum
