= Oak Ridge Observatory =

Observatory in Harvard, Massachusetts

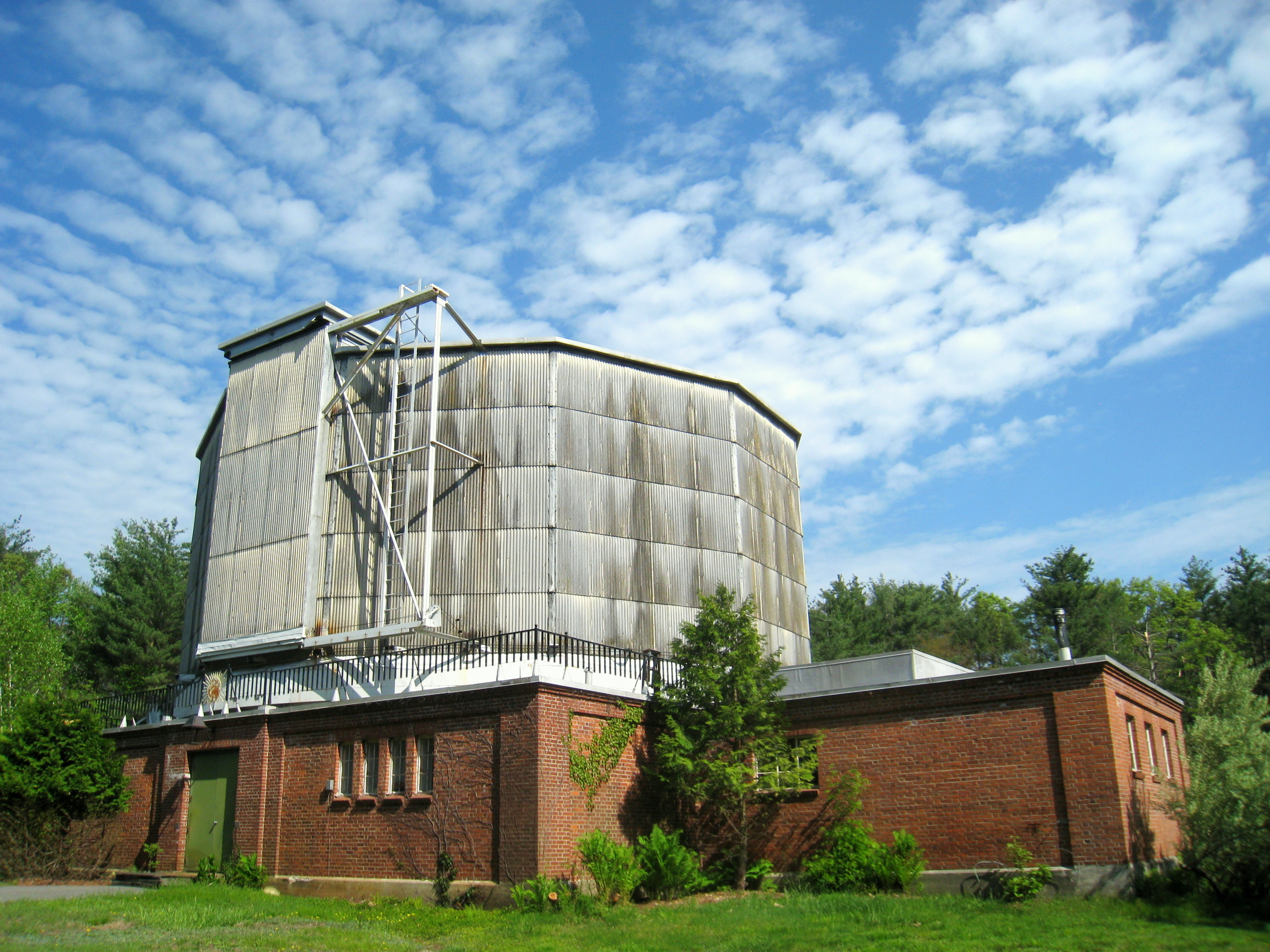
- Alternative names: George R. Agassiz Station
- Observatory code: 801
- Location: Harvard, Massachusetts
- Coordinates: 42°30′18″N 71°33′29″W
- Established: 1933
- Website: tdc-www.harvard.edu/oakridge/oakridge/
- Telescopes: Project BETA Telescope; Wyeth 61-inch reflector
- Location of Oak Ridge Observatory
- Related media on Commons

Minor planets discovered: 38
see § List of discovered minor planets

The Oak Ridge Observatory (ORO, code: 801), also known as the George R. Agassiz Station, is located at 42 Pinnacle Road, Harvard, Massachusetts. It was operated by the Center for Astrophysics | Harvard & Smithsonian as a facility of the Smithsonian Astrophysical Observatory (SAO) from 1933 until August 19, 2005.

== Description ==
The observatory was established in 1933. Through its first 40 years, its primary research focus was on tracking minor planets and asteroids in the Solar System. Starting in the 1980s, astronomers began to use the facility to measure stars over long periods of time, which led to hunts for extrasolar planets.

The largest telescope east of Texas in the United States is the 61-inch reflector (see Hobby-Eberly Telescope). However, most of its projects were discontinued in 2005. Harvard University's Optical SETI program continues at the site.

It also housed an 84-foot (26 m) steerable radio telescope once used in Project BETA, a search for extraterrestrial intelligence. A 41-cm (16-inch) Boller and Chivens Cassegrain reflector originally housed at Oak Ridge is available for public use at the National Air and Space Museum's Public Observatory Project on the National Mall in Washington, DC.

The inner main-belt asteroid 4733 ORO, discovered at Oak Ridge in 1982, was named in honor of the observatory.

== List of discovered minor planets ==
In addition to the discoveries below, the Minor Planet Center inconsistently credits some asteroids such as 4760 Jia-xiang directly to the Harvard College Observatory although they have been discovered at Oak Ridge.

| 2674 Pandarus | 27 January 1982 | list |
| 2872 Gentelec | 5 September 1981 | list |
| 3076 Garber | 13 September 1982 | list |
| 3342 Fivesparks | 27 January 1982 | list |
| 3773 Smithsonian | 23 December 1984 | list |
| 3797 Ching-Sung Yu | 22 December 1987 | list |
| 4372 Quincy | 3 October 1984 | list |
| 4733 ORO | 19 April 1982 | list |
| 5976 Kalatajean | 25 September 1992 | list |
| 6696 Eubanks | 1 September 1986 | list |
| 6949 Zissell | 11 September 1982 | list |
| 7276 Maymie | 4 September 1983 | list |
| 7383 Lassovszky | 30 September 1981 | list |
| 7386 Paulpellas | 25 November 1981 | list |

| 7461 Kachmokiam | 3 October 1984 | list |
| 7639 Offutt | 21 February 1985 | list |
| 7738 Heyman | 24 November 1981 | list |
| 7940 Erichmeyer | 13 March 1991 | list |
| 8161 Newman | 19 August 1990 | list |
| 8357 O'Connor | 25 September 1989 | list |
| 8496 Jandlsmith | 16 August 1990 | list |
| 9179 Satchmo | 13 March 1991 | list |
| 9291 Alanburdick | 17 August 1982 | list |
| 9929 McConnell | 24 February 1982 | list |
| 10289 Geoffperry | 24 August 1984 | list |
| 10290 Kettering | 17 September 1985 | list |
| 12223 Hoskin | 8 October 1983 | list |
| 12224 Jimcornell | 19 October 1984 | list |

| (12319) 1992 PC | 2 August 1992 | list |
| (13635) 1995 WA_{42} | 22 November 1995 | list |
| (14416) 1991 RU_{7} | 8 September 1991 | list |
| (14830) 1986 XR_{5} | 5 December 1986 | list |
| (15731) 1990 UW_{2} | 16 October 1990 | list |
| (16437) 1988 XX_{1} | 7 December 1988 | list |
| (17400) 1985 PL_{1} | 13 August 1985 | list |
| (26809) 1984 QU | 24 August 1984 | list |
| (43755) 1983 RJ_{1} | 5 September 1983 | list |
| (168315) 1982 RA_{1} | 13 September 1982 | list |

== See also ==
- Harvard University seismograph station
- Hobby–Eberly Telescope
- List of minor planet discoverers § Discovering dedicated institutions
- List of astronomical observatories
- Phoebe Waterman Haas Public Observatory
- Smithsonian Astrophysical Observatory
