= Zhang Jiaxiang =

Chinese astronomer (1932–2019)

Asteroids discovered: 1
| 5384 Changjiangcun | November 11, 1957 | MPC |

Zhang Jiaxiang (Chinese: 张家祥; 30 October 1932 – 29 December 2019), also known as Chia-Hsiang Chang, was a Chinese astronomer affiliated with Purple Mountain Observatory, Chinese Academy of Sciences, and president of the Minor Planet Foundation at that observatory.

He discovered 5384 Changjiangcun, an inner main-belt asteroid of the Hungaria family at the Purple Mountain Observatory in 1957 named after the village near Zhangjiagang, China. It is his only discovery credited by the Minor Planet Center under the name "C.-H. Chang".

== Biography ==
Zhang Jiaxiang was born on 30 October 1932 in Nanjing, Jiangsu, Republic of China. In 1951, he first joined the Purple Mountain Observatory as a technician, supervised by director Zhang Yuzhe.

In 1957, Zhang Yuzhe and Zhang Jiaxiang published a paper discussing the orbit of artificial satellites. From 1965 to 1972, Zhang led the project of orbit determination of the first Chinese artificial satellite and thereafter the systematic studies of the orbit of Chinese synchronous satellite. His group discovered more than 150 new minor planets and four comets. In the 1990s, he accurately predicted a series of collision times between 19 comet nuclei and Jupiter, based on his self-established numerical model of the Solar System dynamics. He then served as the chief scientist for the construction of the Near Earth Object Telescope.

In recognition of his contributions, the Center for Astrophysics | Harvard & Smithsonian named the asteroid 4760 Jia-xiang after him.

Zhang died on 29 December 2019, aged 87.

== See also ==
- List of minor planet discoverers § C.-H. Chang
