= 4760 Jia-xiang =

Background asteroid from the inner regions of the asteroid belt

Discovery
- Discovered by: Harvard College Obs.
- Discovery site: Oak Ridge Obs.
- Discovery date: 1 April 1981

Designations
- Named after: Zhang Jiaxiang (Chinese astronomer)
- Alternative designations: 1981 GN_{1} · 1981 GP_{1} 1982 SE_{5}
- Minor planet category: main-belt · (inner) background

Orbital characteristics
- Epoch 23 March 2018 (JD 2458200.5)
- Uncertainty parameter 0
- Observation arc: 62.47 yr (22,817 d)
- Aphelion: 2.6236 AU
- Perihelion: 2.0279 AU
- Semi-major axis: 2.3258 AU
- Eccentricity: 0.1281
- Orbital period (sidereal): 3.55 yr (1,296 d)
- Mean anomaly: 37.063°
- Mean motion: 0° 16^{m} 40.44^{s} / day
- Inclination: 9.8513°
- Longitude of ascending node: 177.82°
- Argument of perihelion: 130.44°

Physical characteristics
- Mean diameter: 4.71 km (calculated); 4.79±1.41 km 5.137±0.036 km 5.16±1.28 km
- Synodic rotation period: 14.96±0.0006 h (Note: Pravec (2017) web: rotation period 14.96±0.02 and 14.9601±0.0006 hours with a brightness amplitude of 0.55±0.02 and 0.63±0.02 mag. Quality Code is 3/3. Summary figures at the LCDB and Pravec, P.; Wolf, M.; Sarounova, L. (2017)) (Note: Lightcurve plot A and plot B of (4760) Jia-xiang, from Ondrejov data obtained by the NEO Photometric Program and collaborating projects); 14.9601 h
- Geometric albedo: 0.13±0.06; 0.20 (assumed); 0.21±0.15; 0.227±0.042; 0.2275±0.0418
- Spectral type: S (assumed)
- Absolute magnitude (H): 13.56±0.40 · 13.7 · 13.90 · 14.0 · 14.29

4760 Jia-xiang, provisional designation 1981 GN_{1}, is a background asteroid from the inner regions of the asteroid belt, approximately 5 kilometers (3 miles) in diameter. It was discovered on 1 April 1981, by astronomers at Harvard University's Oak Ridge Observatory in Massachusetts, United States. The presumed stony S-type asteroid was named after Chinese astronomer Zhang Jiaxiang. It has a rotation period of 14.96 hours.

== Orbit and classification ==
Jia-xiang is a non-family asteroid from the main belt's background population. It orbits the Sun in the inner main-belt at a distance of 2.0–2.6 AU once every 3 years and 7 months (1,296 days; semi-major axis of 2.33 AU). Its orbit has an eccentricity of 0.13 and an inclination of 10° with respect to the ecliptic. The body's observation arc begins with a precovery taken at Palomar Observatory in January 1955, or 26 years prior to its official discovery observation at Oak Ridge.

== Physical characteristics ==
=== Rotation period ===
In 2017, two rotational lightcurves of Jia-xiang were obtained from photometric observations by Czech astronomer Petr Pravec at Ondřejov Observatory. Lightcurve analysis gave a rotation period of 14.96 and 14.9601 hours with a brightness amplitude of 0.55 and 0.63 magnitude, respectively (U=3/3).

=== Diameter and albedo ===
According to the survey carried out by the NEOWISE mission of NASA's Wide-field Infrared Survey Explorer, Jia-xiang measures between 4.79 and 5.16 kilometers in diameter and its surface has an albedo between 0.13 and 0.2275.

The Collaborative Asteroid Lightcurve Link assumes an albedo of 0.20 and calculates a diameter of 4.71 kilometers based on an absolute magnitude of 14.0.

== Naming ==
This minor planet was named after Chinese astronomer Zhang Jiaxiang (born 1932). The official naming citation was published by the Minor Planet Center on 21 November 1991 (M.P.C. 19339).
