= National Air and Space Museum =

Museum in Washington, D.C.

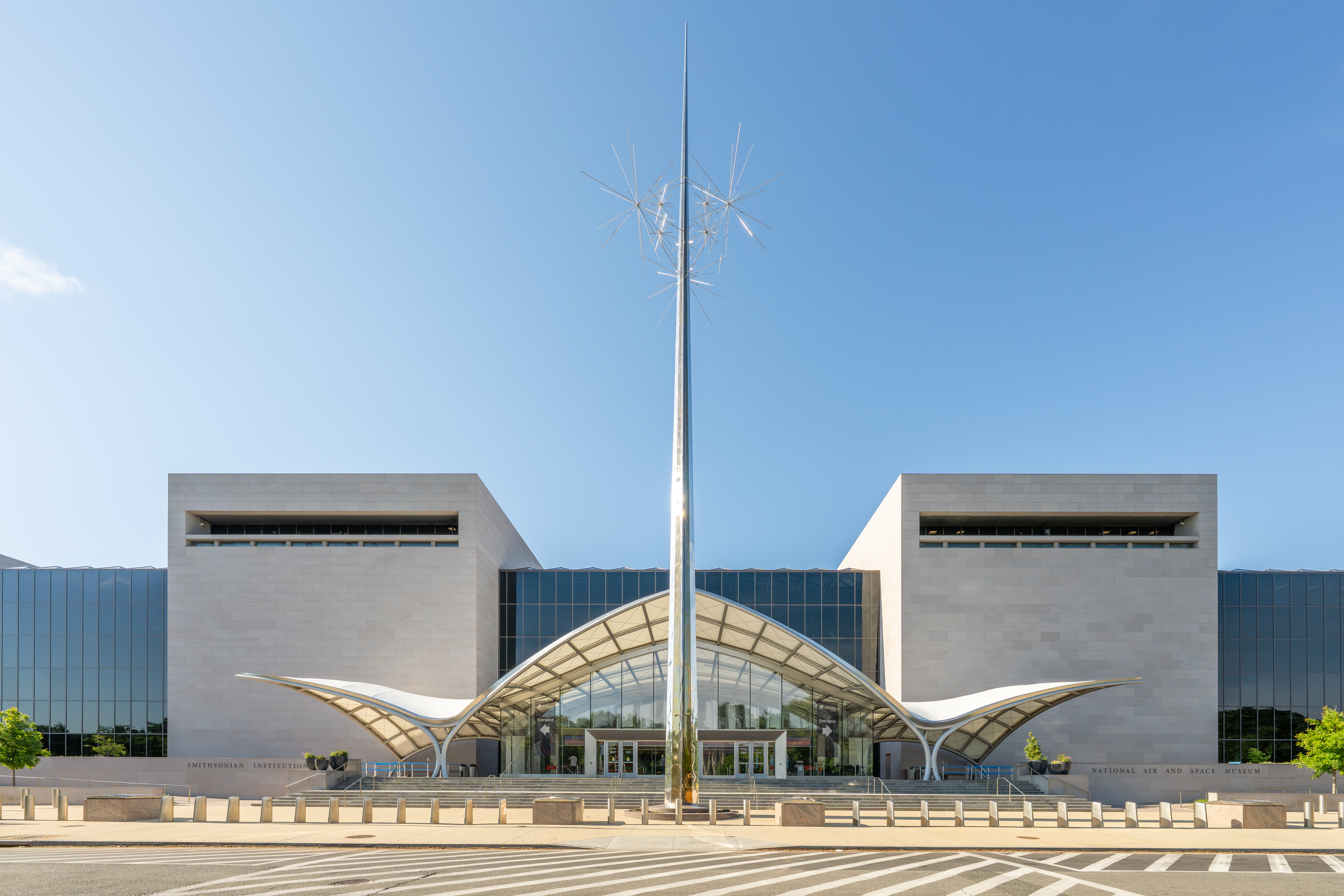
- Ad Astra sculpture at the museum entrance on the National Mall

- Location within Washington, D.C. National Air and Space Museum (the United States)
- Former name: National Air Museum
- Established: 1946; 80 years ago (as the National Air Museum)
- Location: Washington, D.C.
- Coordinates: 38°53′18″N 77°01′12″W
- Type: Aviation museum
- Accreditation: American Alliance of Museums
- Visitors: 3.1 million visitors (2023)
- Director: Chris Browne
- Curator: Peter Jakab
- Public transit access: Washington Metro at L'Enfant Plaza
- Website: airandspace.si.edu

The National Air and Space Museum (NASM) of the Smithsonian Institution is a museum in Washington, D.C., United States, dedicated to human flight and space exploration.

Established in 1946 as the National Air Museum, its main building opened on the National Mall near L'Enfant Plaza in 1976. In 2023, the museum welcomed 3.1 million visitors, making it the fourth-most visited museum in the United States and eleventh-most in the world.

The museum is a center for research into the history and science of aviation and spaceflight, as well as planetary science and terrestrial geology and geophysics. Almost all of its spacecraft and aircraft on display are original primary or backup craft (rather than facsimiles). Its collection includes the Apollo 11 Command Module Columbia, the Friendship 7 capsule which was flown by John Glenn, Charles Lindbergh's Spirit of St. Louis, the model of the starship Enterprise used in the science fiction television show Star Trek: The Original Series, and the Wright brothers' Wright Flyer airplane near the entrance.

The museum operates a 760,000-square-foot (71,000 m^{2}) annex, the Steven F. Udvar-Hazy Center, at Dulles International Airport. It includes the Mary Baker Engen Restoration Hangar, which houses the museum's restoration and archival activities. Other preservation and restoration efforts take place at the Paul E. Garber Preservation, Restoration, and Storage Facility in Suitland, Maryland.

The museum's National Mall building is undergoing a $360-million renovation that started in 2018. As of August 2024, 13 of the museum's galleries were open to the public, with the other 10 expected to reopen by 2026.

== History ==
=== National Air Museum ===
The Air and Space Museum was originally called the National Air Museum when formed on August 12, 1946, by an act of Congress and signed into law by President Harry S. Truman. Some pieces in the National Air and Space Museum collection date back to the 1876 Centennial Exposition in Philadelphia, after which the Chinese Imperial Commission donated a group of kites to the Smithsonian after Smithsonian Secretary Spencer Fullerton Baird convinced exhibiters that shipping them home would be too costly. The Stringfellow steam engine intended for aircraft was added to the collection in 1989, the first piece actively acquired by the Smithsonian now in the current NASM collection.

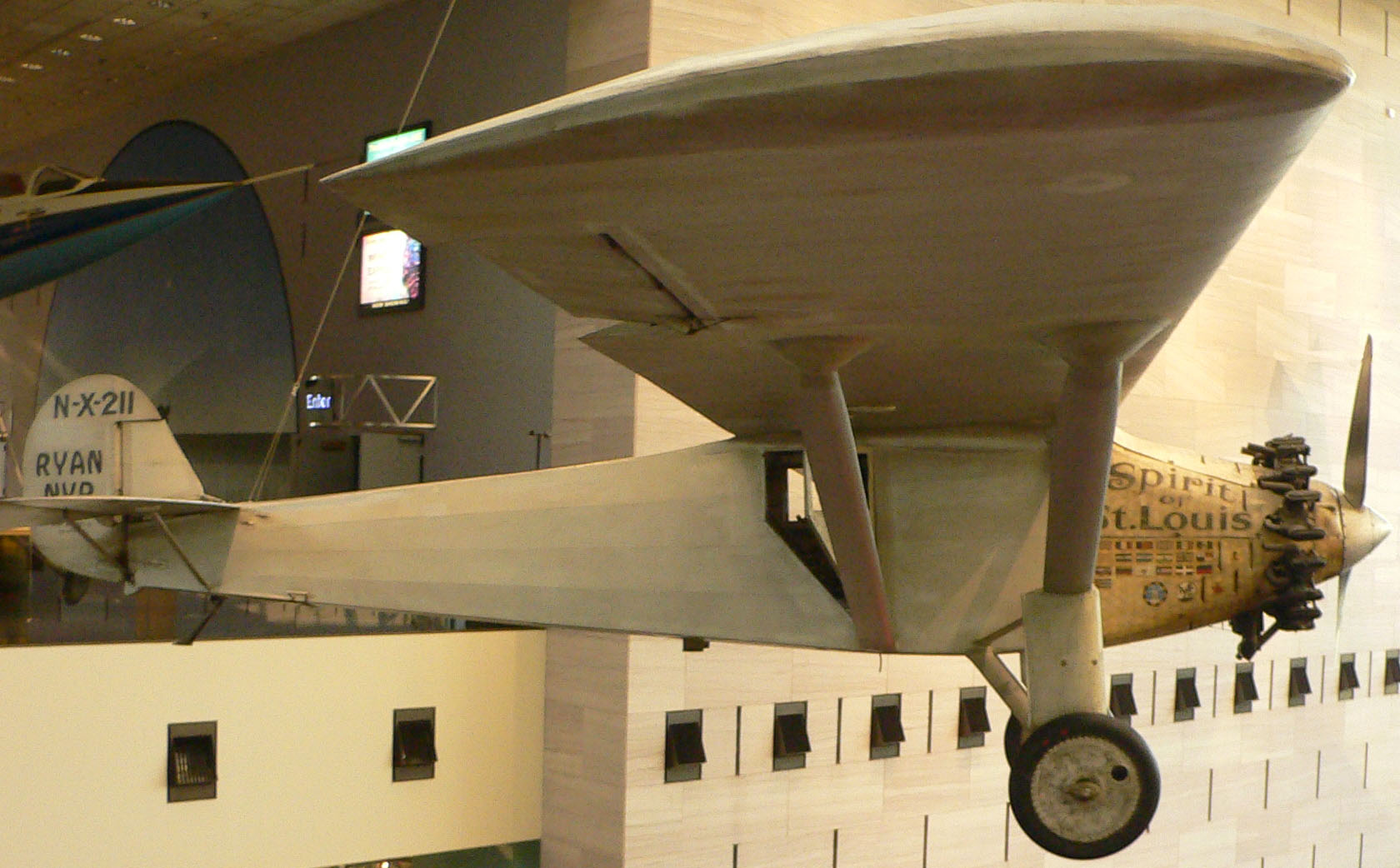
The Spirit of St. Louis, flown by aviator Charles Lindbergh in 1927 on the first solo nonstop transatlantic flight

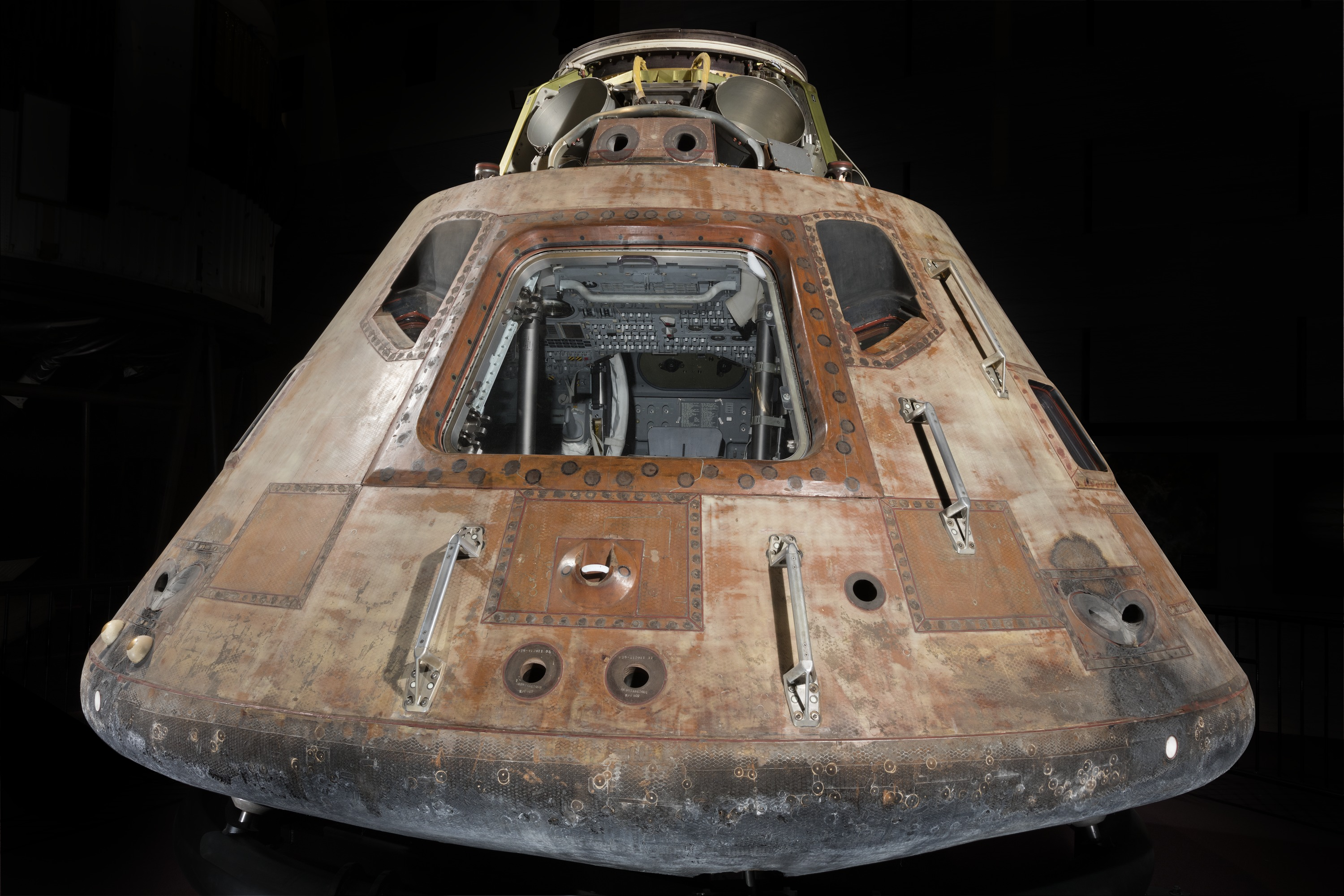
The Apollo 11 Command Module Columbia carried astronauts Buzz Aldrin, Neil Armstrong, and Michael Collins to the Moon and back during the first human lunar landing mission, July 1969

After the establishment of the museum, there was no one building that could hold all the items to be displayed, many obtained from the United States Army and United States Navy collections of domestic and captured aircraft from World War I. Some pieces were on display in the Arts and Industries Building, some were stored in the Aircraft Building (also known as the "Tin Shed"), a large temporary metal shed in the Smithsonian Castle's south yard. Larger missiles and rockets were displayed outdoors in what was known as Rocket Row. The shed housed a large Martin bomber, a LePere fighter-bomber, and an Aeromarine 39B floatplane. Still, much of the collection remained in storage due to a lack of display space.

The combination of the large numbers of aircraft donated to the Smithsonian after World War II and the need for hangar and factory space for the Korean War drove the Smithsonian to look for its own facility to store and restore aircraft. The current Garber Facility was ceded to the Smithsonian by the Maryland-National Capital Park and Planning Commission in 1952 after the curator Paul E. Garber spotted the wooded area from the air. Bulldozers from Fort Belvoir and prefabricated buildings from the United States Navy kept the initial costs low.

=== Construction of current building ===
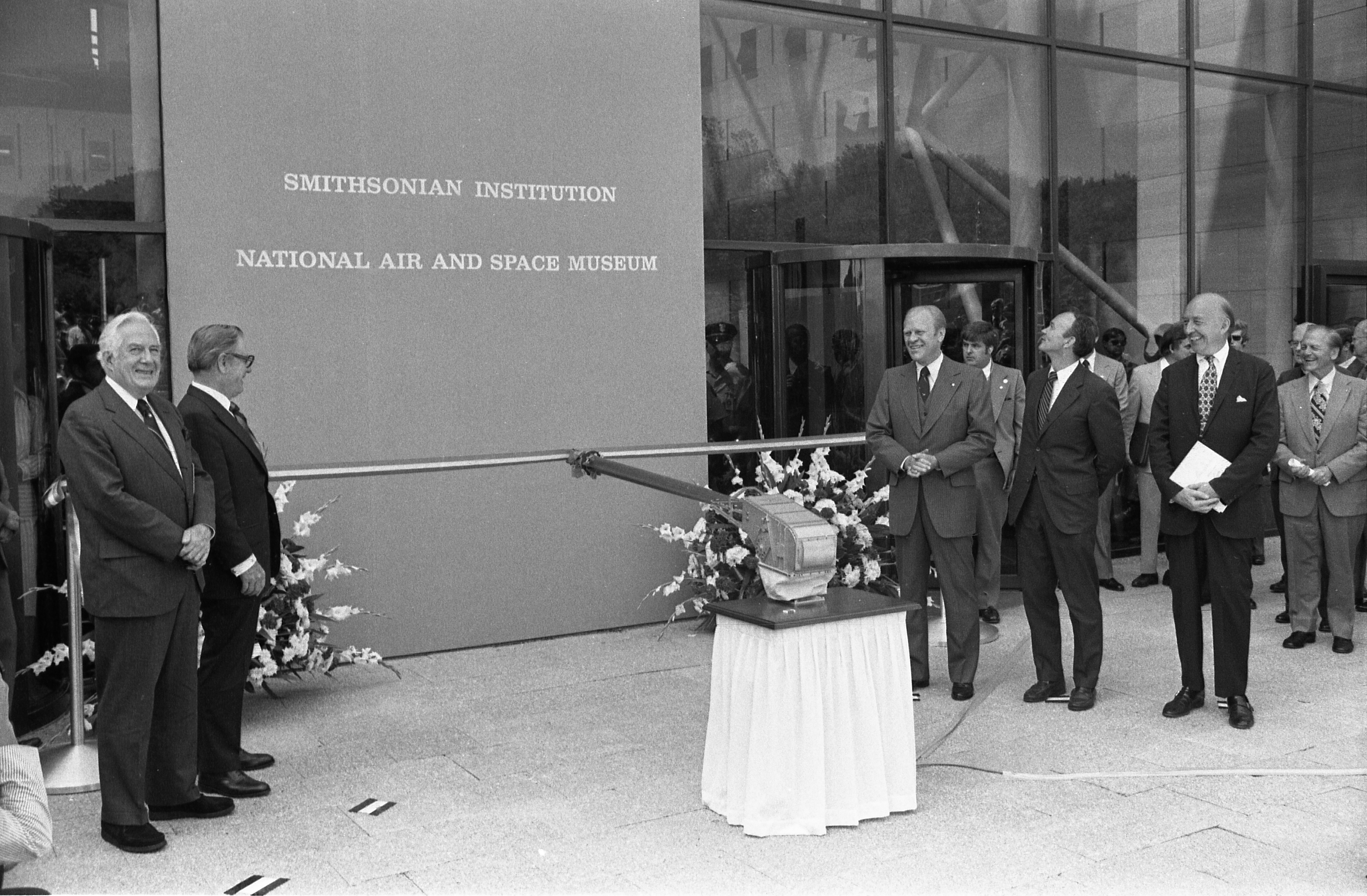
Ribbon Cutting Ceremony at the Dedication of the National Air and Space Museum of the Smithsonian

The museum's prominent site on the National Mall once housed the city's armory, which became Armory Square Hospital during the Civil War; it nursed the worst wounded cases who were transported to Washington after battles. The rest of the site was occupied by a cluster of temporary war buildings that existed from World War I until the 1960s.

The space race in the 1950s and 1960s led to the renaming of the museum to the National Air and Space Museum, and finally congressional passage of appropriations for the construction of the new exhibition hall, which opened July 1, 1976, at the height of the United States Bicentennial festivities under the leadership of Director Michael Collins, who had flown to the Moon on Apollo 11.

=== Later history ===
In 1988, a glass-enclosed pavilion named the Wright Place was constructed and opened at the east end of the museum. It contained a restaurant known as Flight Lane, but the restaurant closed in 2001 and reopened as a food court on May 24, 2002, with McDonald's (later added with a McCafé), Boston Market, and Donato's Pizza serving as the tenants.

The Steven F. Udvar-Hazy Center opened on December 15, 2003, funded by a private donation.

The museum received COSTAR, the corrective optics instrument installed in the Hubble Space Telescope during its first servicing mission (STS-61), when it was removed and returned to Earth after Space Shuttle mission STS-125. The museum also holds the backup mirror for the Hubble which, unlike the one that was launched, was ground to the correct shape. There were once plans for it to be installed to the Hubble itself, but plans to return the satellite to Earth were scrapped after the Space Shuttle Columbia disaster in 2003; the mission was re-considered as too risky.

In 2018, the museum received Schmitt Space Communicator, the device with the on-flight internet connection launched by Solstar on a New Shepard rocket to send the first tweet from space.

The Smithsonian has also been promised the International Cometary Explorer, which is currently in a solar orbit that occasionally brings it back to Earth, should NASA attempt to recover it.

== Architecture ==
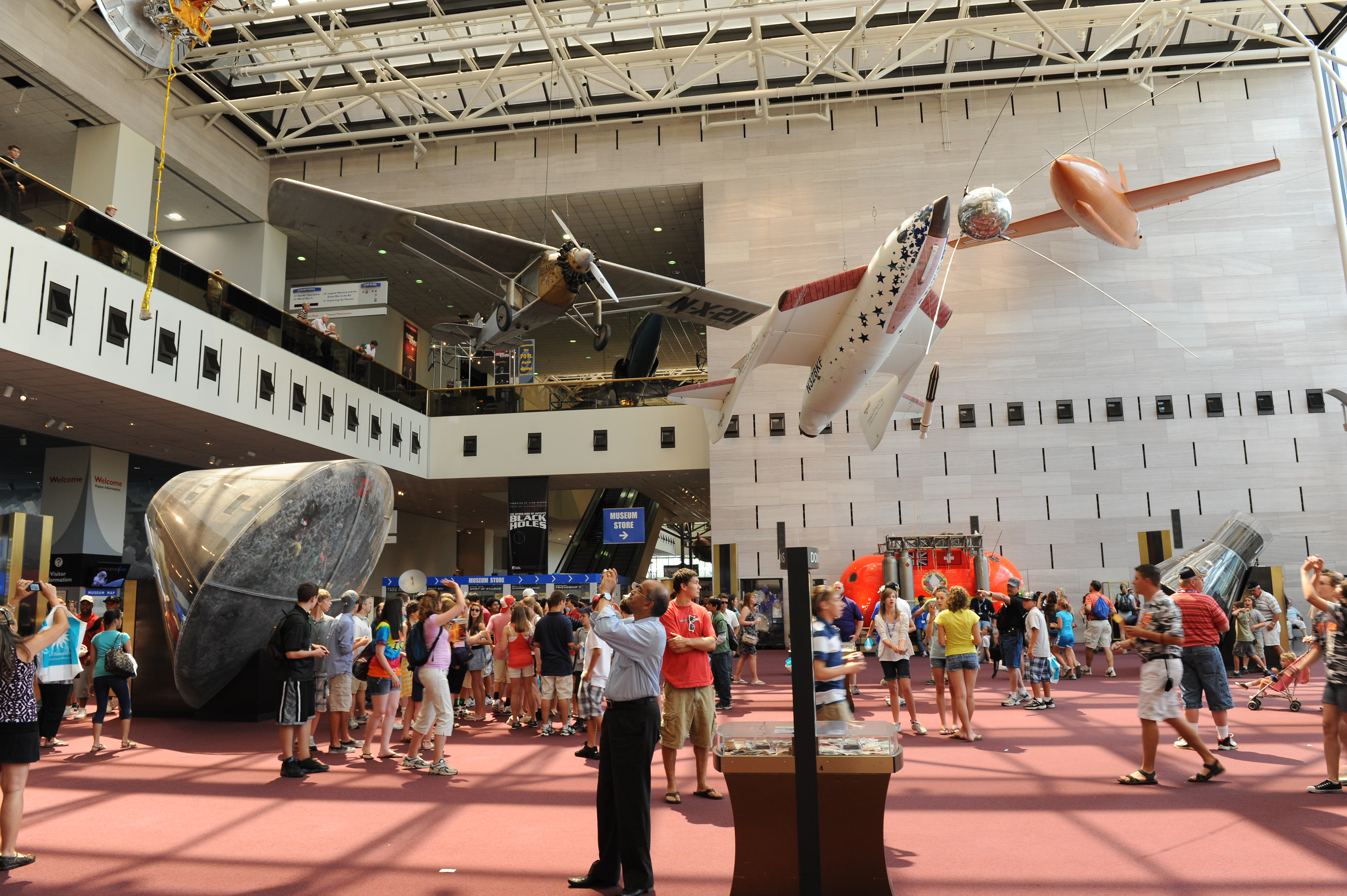
The Milestones of Flight entrance hall of the National Air and Space Museum in Washington, DC. Among the visible aircraft are Spirit of St. Louis, the Apollo 11 Command Module Columbia, SpaceShipOne, the Bell X-1, and (far right) John Glenn's Friendship 7 capsule.

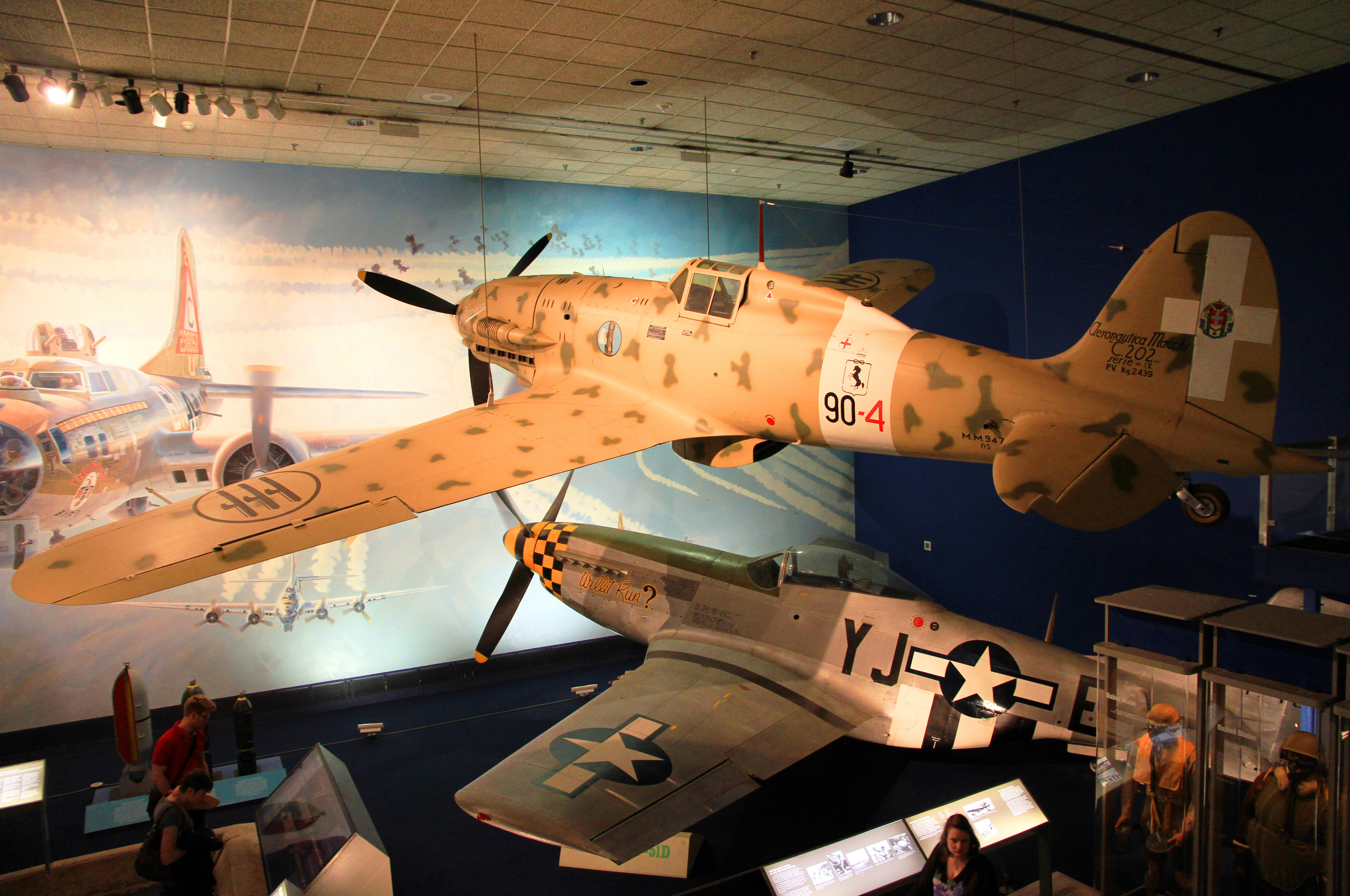
Macchi C.202 and P-51D Mustang

Because of the museum's close proximity to the United States Capitol, the Smithsonian wanted a building that would be architecturally impressive but would not stand out too boldly against the Capitol building. St. Louis–based architect Gyo Obata of HOK designed the museum as four simple marble-encased cubes containing the smaller and more theatrical exhibits, connected by three spacious steel-and-glass atria which house the larger exhibits such as missiles, airplanes and spacecraft. The mass of the museum is similar to the National Gallery of Art across the National Mall, and uses the same pink Tennessee marble as the National Gallery. Built by Gilbane Building Company, the museum was completed in 1976. The west glass wall of the building is used for the installation of airplanes, functioning as a giant door.

=== Renovation ===
Since 1976, the Air and Space Museum has received basic repair. In 2001, the glass curtain walls were replaced.

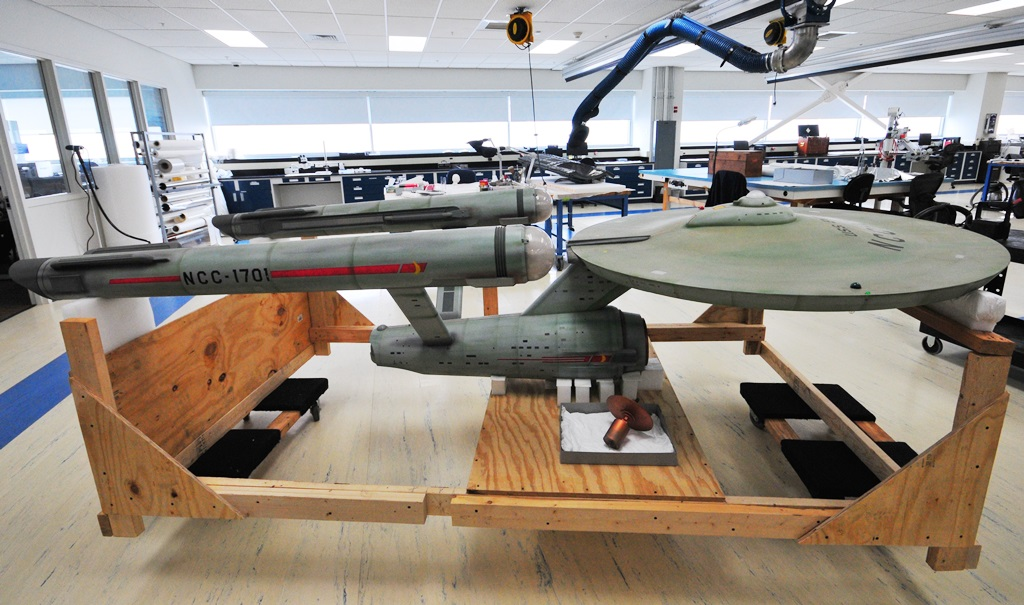
Paramount's filming model of the Star Trek starship USS Enterprise (NCC-1701) under restoration, prior to it being placed on display at the NASM

The Air and Space Museum announced a two-year renovation of its main entrance hall, "Milestones of Flight", in April 2014. The renovation to the main hall (which had not received a major update since the museum opened in 1976) was funded by a $30 million donation from Boeing. The gift, which will be paid over seven years, is the largest corporate donation ever received by the Air and Space Museum. Boeing had previously given donations totaling $58 million. The hall will be renamed the "Boeing Milestones of Flight Hall". The renovation (whose total cost was not revealed) began in April 2014, and will involve the temporary removal of some exhibits before the hall is refurbished. Because some exhibits represent century-old achievements that no longer resonate with the public, some items will be moved to other locations in the museum while new exhibits are installed.

The first new exhibit, a drive fan from a wind tunnel dating back to the 1930s and used by NASA's predecessor organization, the National Advisory Committee for Aeronautics, was installed in February 2015. Following completion, the hall will present a "more orderly" appearance, and allow room for the placement of future new exhibits (which will include moving the filming model of the USS Enterprise from the original 1960s Star Trek television series into the hall). The renovation will also include the installation of a "media wall" and touch-screen information kiosks to allow visitors to learn about items on display. An additional gift from Boeing is funding the renovation of the "How Things Fly" children's exhibit, new museum educational programming, and the creation of an accredited course on flight and space technology for elementary and secondary school teachers.

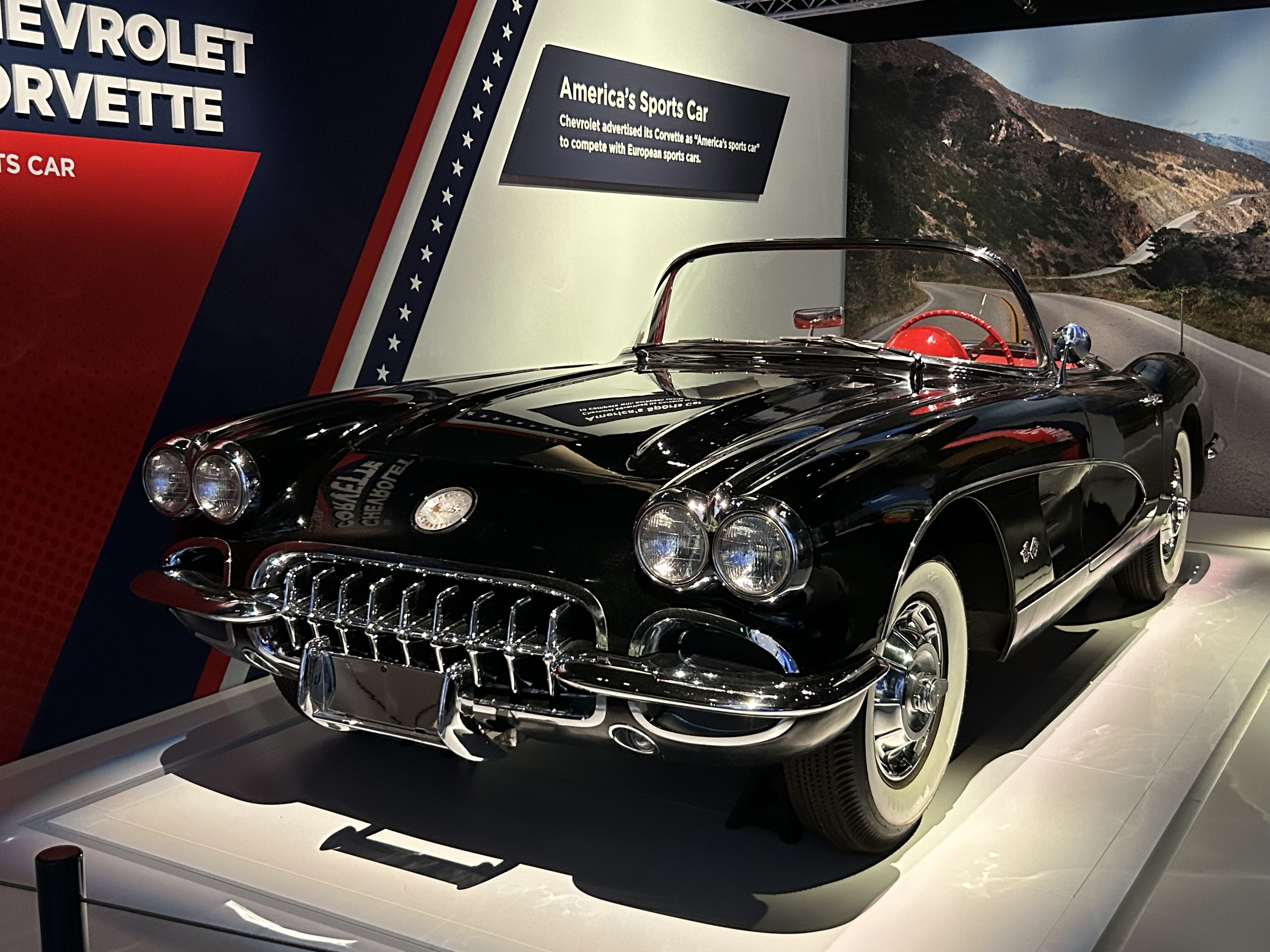
1959 Chevrolet Corvette C1 on display in the NASM's Nation of Speed exhibit

In June 2015, the Smithsonian made public a report which documented the need for extensive renovations to the Air and Space Museum. Many of the building's mechanical and environmental systems were redesigned during its construction from 1972 to 1976, which left them inadequate to handle the environmental, visitor, and other stresses placed on the building and its exhibits. Subsequently, these systems are in serious disrepair and exhibits are being harmed. The report noted that the HVAC system is close to failure, and the roof has been compromised so badly that it must be replaced. The Tennessee marble façade has cracked and become warped, and in some areas is so damaged it could fall off the building. (Note: The marble was backed with spray-foam insulation, which insufficiently blocked water and air and worsened the extensive fracturing. The marble cannot be repaired without irreversibly damaging the insulation behind it, which necessitates the replacement of the entire façade.)

The museum's glass curtain walls (among those elements of the 1976 structure whose design was altered for cost reasons) are too permeable to ultraviolet radiation. Several exhibits (such as the spacesuit worn by John Young during the Gemini 10 mission, and the coating on the Spirit of St. Louis aircraft) have been damaged by this radiation. Additionally, the Smithsonian's report noted that cutbacks in building design prior to and during construction left the museum with too few amenities, main entrances which are partially obscured, and exhibit space which does not meet current ADA accessibility standards. New security measures, required after the September 11 attacks in 2001, have created extensive queues which extend outside the building. Exposed, lengthy queues are both a security hazard and often cause visitors to wait in inclement weather.

On June 30, 2015, the Smithsonian began seeking approval for a $365 million renovation to the National Air and Space Museum. The agency hired the firm of Quinn Evans Architects to design the renovations and improvements. Interior changes include improving handicapped accessibility, main entrance visibility, and perimeter security. The entire façade will be replaced, again using Tennessee marble. (Note: The Smithsonian considered using "Echo Lake granite" quarried near Ely, Minnesota; ceramic tile; and titanium tile for the façade, but settled on Tennessee marble because it matches the original and provides a good balance between durability, strength, and weight. The new panels will be 2.5 inches (6.4 cm) thick, whereas the existing panels are 1 inch (2.5 cm) thick.) The glass curtain walls will be replaced with triple glazed, thermally broken panels set in an aluminum frame. The curtain walls will be reinforced with steel to help improve their resistance to explosive blasts.

Additional changes the Smithsonian would like to make, but which are not contained in the $365 million price tag, include the installation of 1,300 solar panels on the roof and the Independence Avenue side of the museum, the construction of vestibules over the main entrances, and reconstruction of the terraces (which leak water into the parking garage and offices beneath the structure). The Smithsonian said it would submit its designs to the National Capital Planning Commission (NCPC) on July 9, 2015, for review and approval. If the NCPC authorizes the changes, the museum could begin work in 2018 and finish in 2024.

In March 2016, Smithsonian officials said the project's cost had risen to $600 million.

In late June 2016, Smithsonian officials projected the museum's renovation to cost $1 billion. This included $676 million for construction, $50 million to build new storage space, and $250 million for new exhibits. The Smithsonian said it would raise the exhibit funds from private sources, but asked Congress to appropriate the rest. It estimated that demolishing the building and erecting a new structure would cost $2 billion.

In October 2018, the museum announced a 7-year renovation process and began closing some galleries between December 2018 and January 2019. The museum remained open throughout the renovation process until its closure in early 2020 with the other Smithsonian museums because of the COVID-19 pandemic.

On March 3, 2022, the museum temporarily reopened as it continued to operate through the month until March 28, 2022, when it closed for six months. The renovation included demolishing the food court pavilion (closed in 2017) to make way for the 50,000-square-foot (4,600 m^{2}), three-story, Jeff Bezos Learning Center. The western side of the museum, featuring eight new galleries, the planetarium, museum store and a cafe reopened on October 14, 2022, as part of Phase I of the renovation, and all of the remaining galleries are planned to reopen by July 2026.

== Controversies and incidents ==
=== Enola Gay ===
Controversy erupted in March 1994 over a proposed commemoration of the 50th anniversary of the atomic bombing of Japan. The centerpiece of the exhibit was the Enola Gay, the B-29 bomber that dropped Little Boy on the Japanese city of Hiroshima. When the first draft of the script for the exhibit was leaked by Air Force Magazine, the responses were very critical. Two sentences described as infamous that sparked controversy were, "For most Americans, this war was fundamentally different than the one waged against Germany and Italy – it was a war of vengeance. For most Japanese, it was a war to defend their unique culture against western imperialism."

Veterans' groups, led by the Air Force Association and The Retired Officers Association, argued strongly that the exhibit's inclusion of Japanese accounts and photographs of victims politicized the exhibit and insulted U.S. airmen. Editorials called the National Air and Space Museum "an unpatriotic institution" due to the political nature of the initial proposed script. Due to harsh backlash from the Air Force Association, the Retired Officers Association, and numerous members of Congress, a revision was created and a second draft proposed. This second revision was greeted with a large amount of Congressional involvement that resulted in line-by-line reviews of the script, which led to the less radical display that was seen in 1995. This was not met without resistance from the scholarly community, though. The Organization of American Historians felt as if Congress's attempts to police and penalize the Smithsonian Institution led to a "transparent attempt at historical cleansing."

Also disputed was the predicted number of U.S. casualties that would have resulted from an invasion of Japan, had that been necessary, after the museum director, Martin O. Harwit, unilaterally reduced the figure by 75% on January 9, 1995, at the height of the dispute. On January 18 the American Legion called for a congressional investigation of the matter, and on January 24, 1995, 81 members of Congress called for Harwit's resignation. Harwit was forced to resign on May 2. However. the exhibit was "radically reduced" and criticized by the New York Times as "the most diminished display in Smithsonian history," the Air and Space Museum placed the forward fuselage of the Enola Gay and other items on display as part of a non-political historical exhibition. Within a year, it had drawn more than a million visitors, making it the most popular special exhibition in the history of the NASM, and when the exhibition closed in May 1998, it had drawn nearly four million visitors.

=== Other incidents ===
On October 8, 2011, the museum was temporarily closed after demonstrators associated with the Occupy D.C. demonstration attempted to enter the museum. Some protesters were pepper sprayed by museum security after a guard was pinned against a wall. One woman was arrested.

On December 5, 2013, food workers at the museum's McDonald's location protested for a living wage. A journalist was detained for illicit filming.

== Exhibition ==
The National Air and Space Museum announced the opening of two display galleries. The first exhibit, “At Home in Space,” explores space travel using real artifacts like Sally Ride's flight jacket. The second exhibit, “Modern Military Aviation,” showcases historical military aircraft from recent decades. These new halls mark the final step in a 10 year project to update the museum’s facilities. Visitors can now experience modern aerospace history through interactive displays and full scaled spacecraft models.

== Directors ==
Carl W. Mitman was the first head of the museum, under the title of Assistant to the Secretary for the National Air Museum, heading the museum from 1946 until his retirement from the Smithsonian in 1952.

Directors have included:

- Philip S. Hopkins, 1958–1964
- S. Paul Johnston, 1964–1969
- Frank A. Taylor (acting), 1969–1971
- Michael Collins, 1971–1978,
- Melvin B. Zisfein (acting), 1978–1979
- Noel W. Hinners, 1979–1982
- Walter J. Boyne, (acting 1982–1983) director 1983–1986
- James C. Tyler (acting), 1986–1987
- Martin O. Harwit, 1987–1995
- Donald D. Engen, 1996–1999
- John R. Dailey, 2000–2018
- Ellen Stofan, 2018–2020
- Christopher U. Browne, (acting 2020–2022) director 2022–present

== Photo gallery ==
The main museum on the mall includes 61 aircraft, 51 large space artifacts, over 2,000 smaller items as of June 1, 2007.

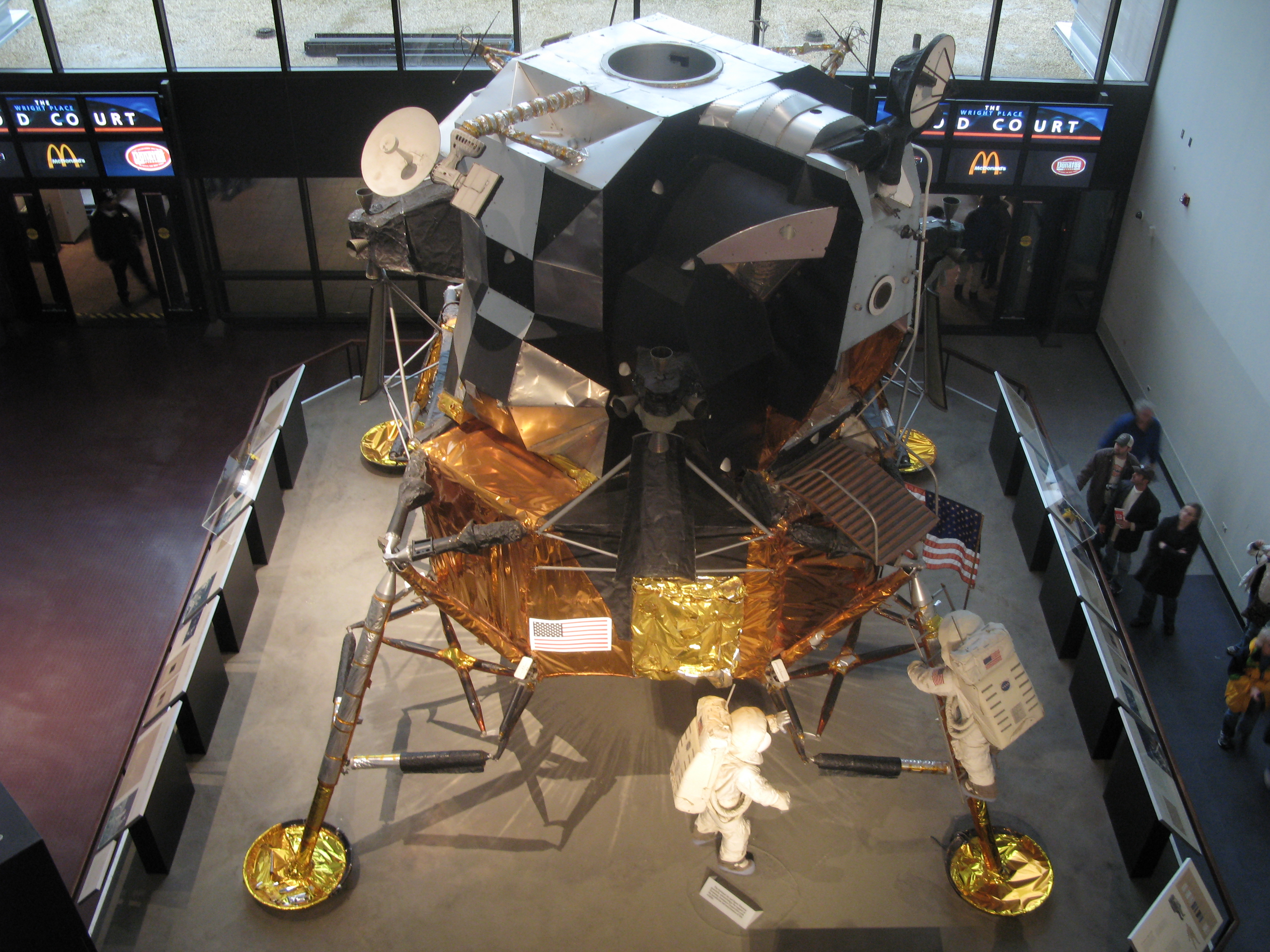
Apollo Lunar Module LM-2, which was used for ground testing the spacecraft

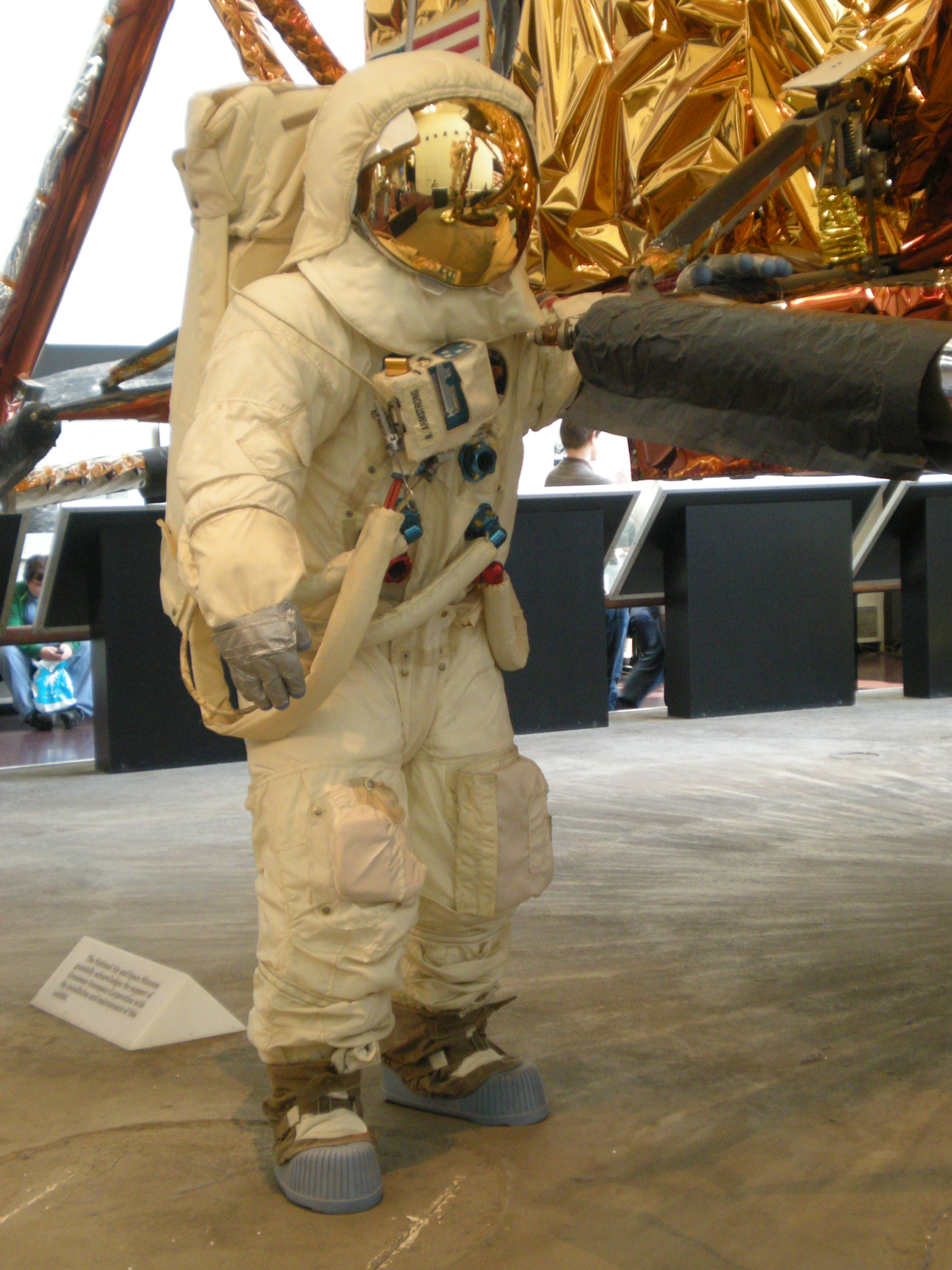
Apollo lunar space suit

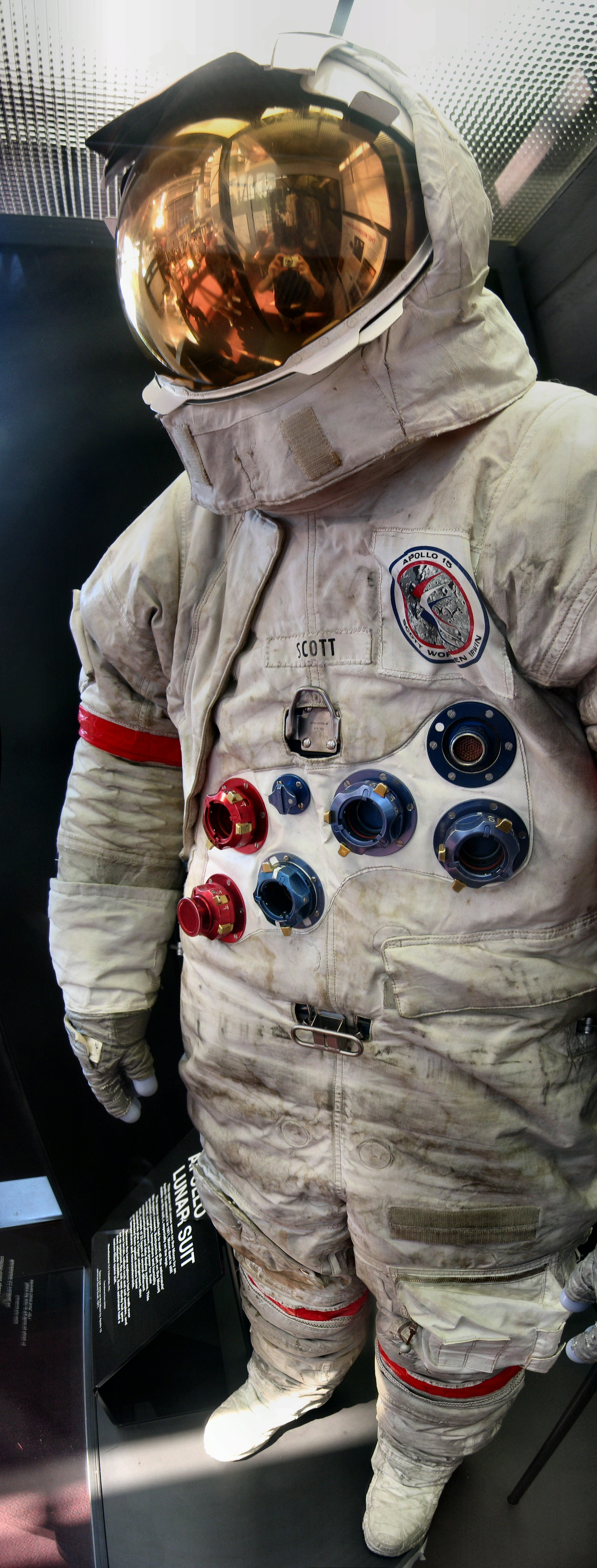
Apollo 15 mission: space suit worn on the Moon by David Scott in 1971

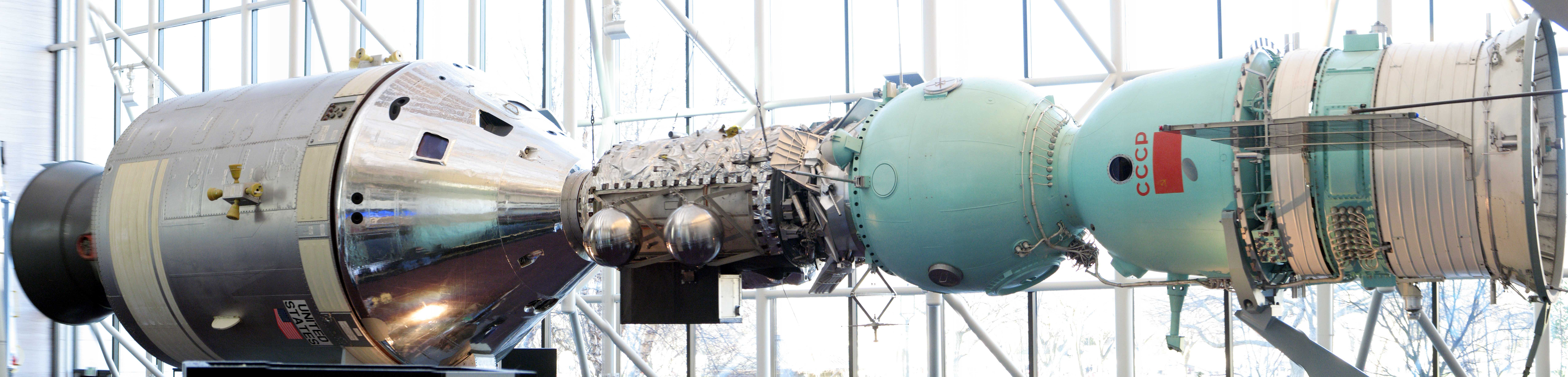
Apollo–Soyuz Test Project Display

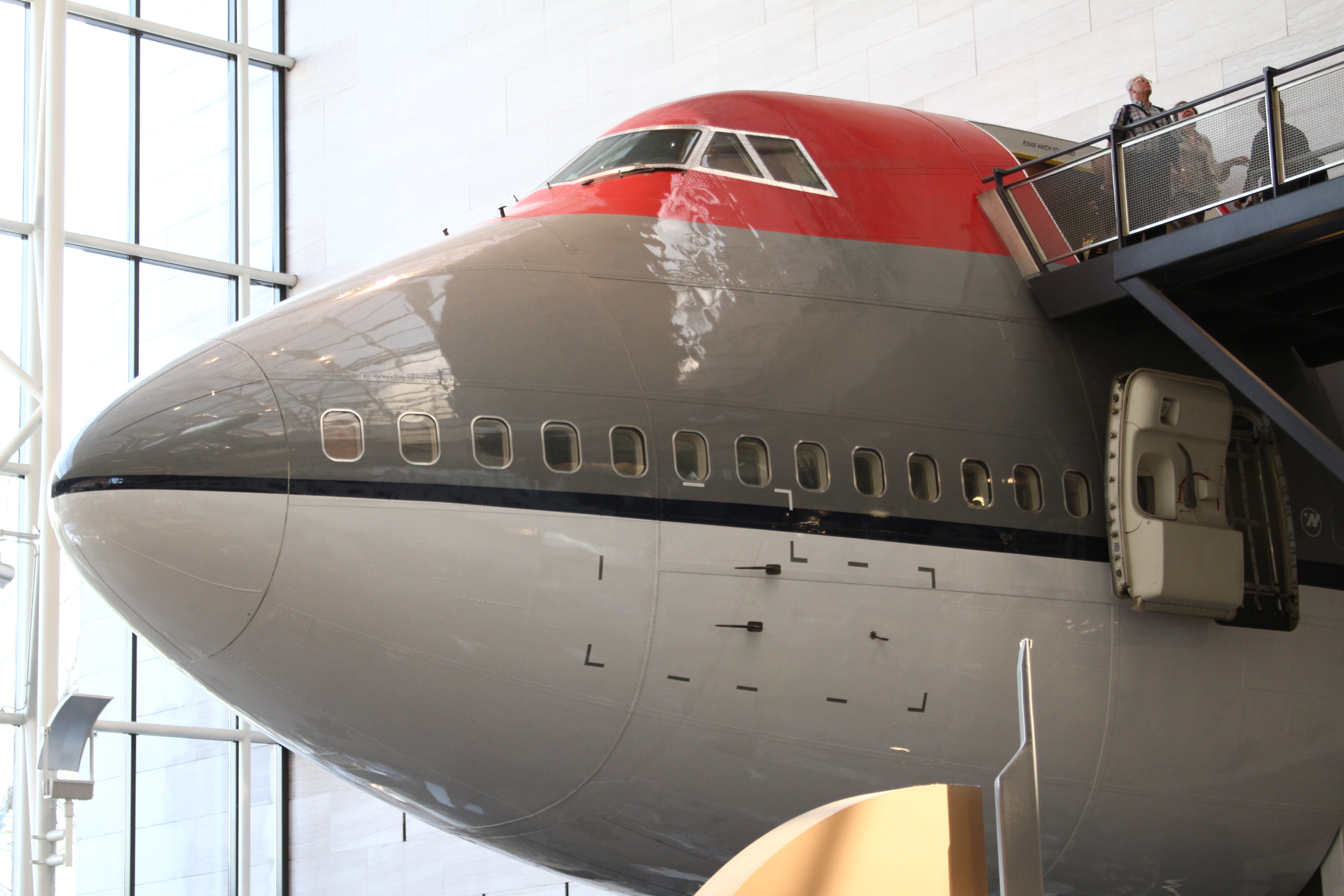
Side view of Boeing 747-100

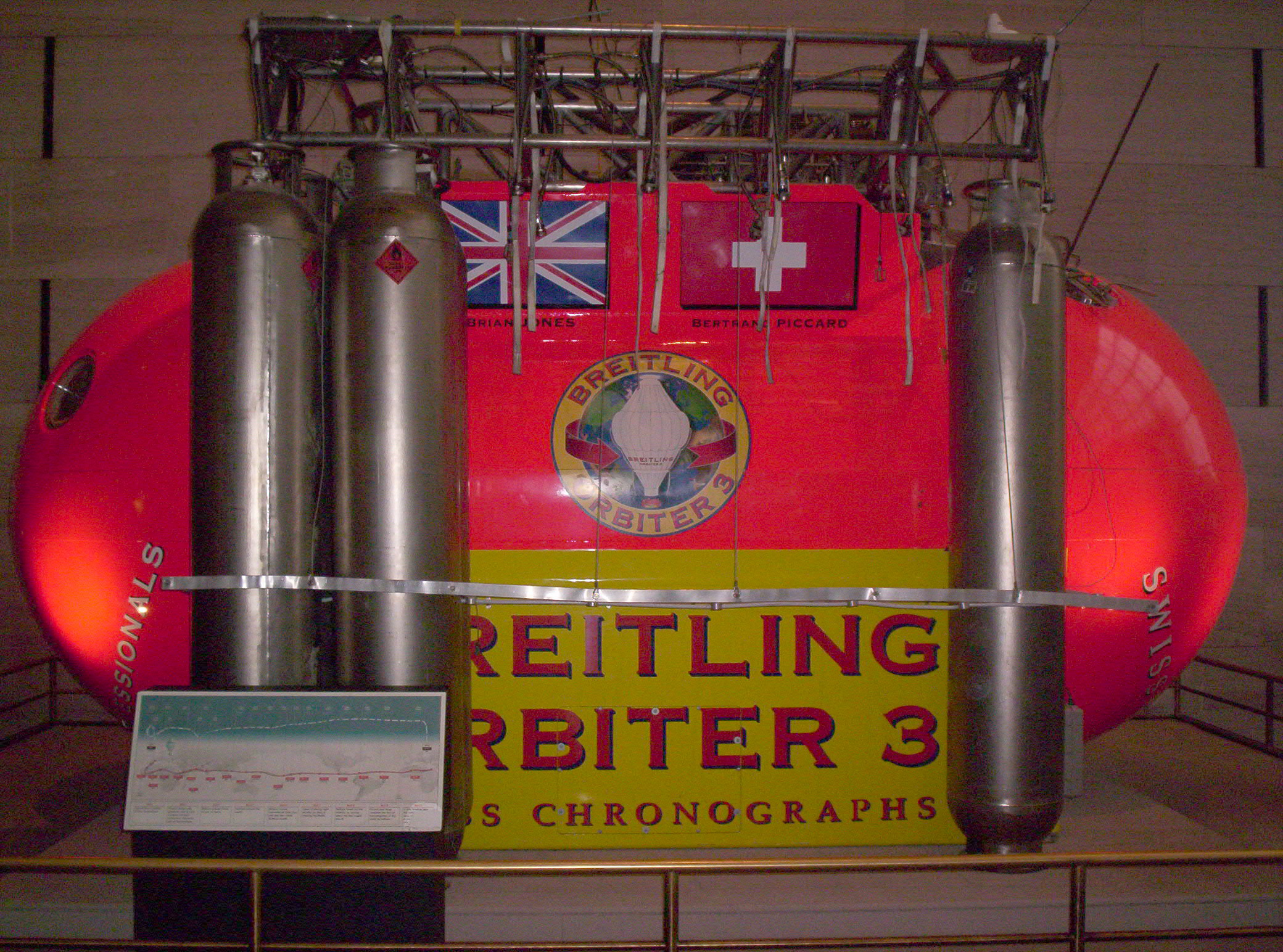
Breitling Orbiter 3, first non-stop balloon circumnavigation of Earth (1999).

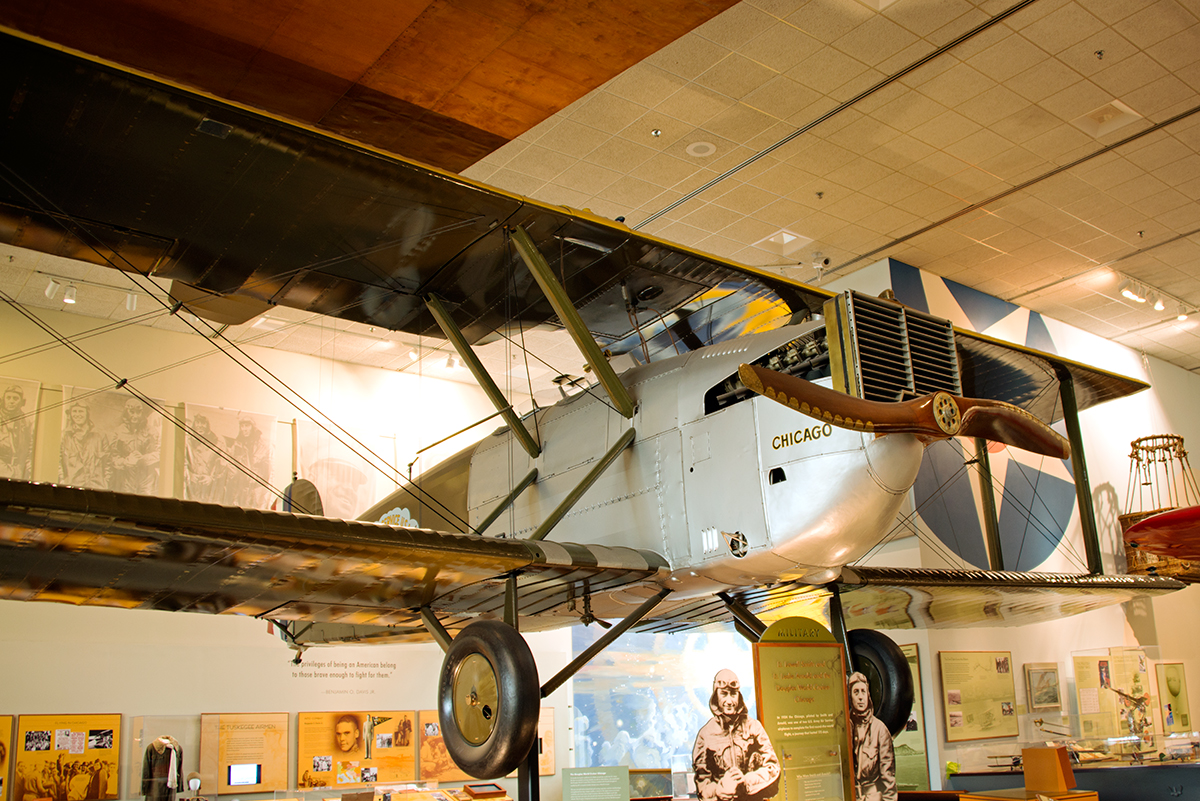
Chicago, the first aircraft to fly around the world (1924)

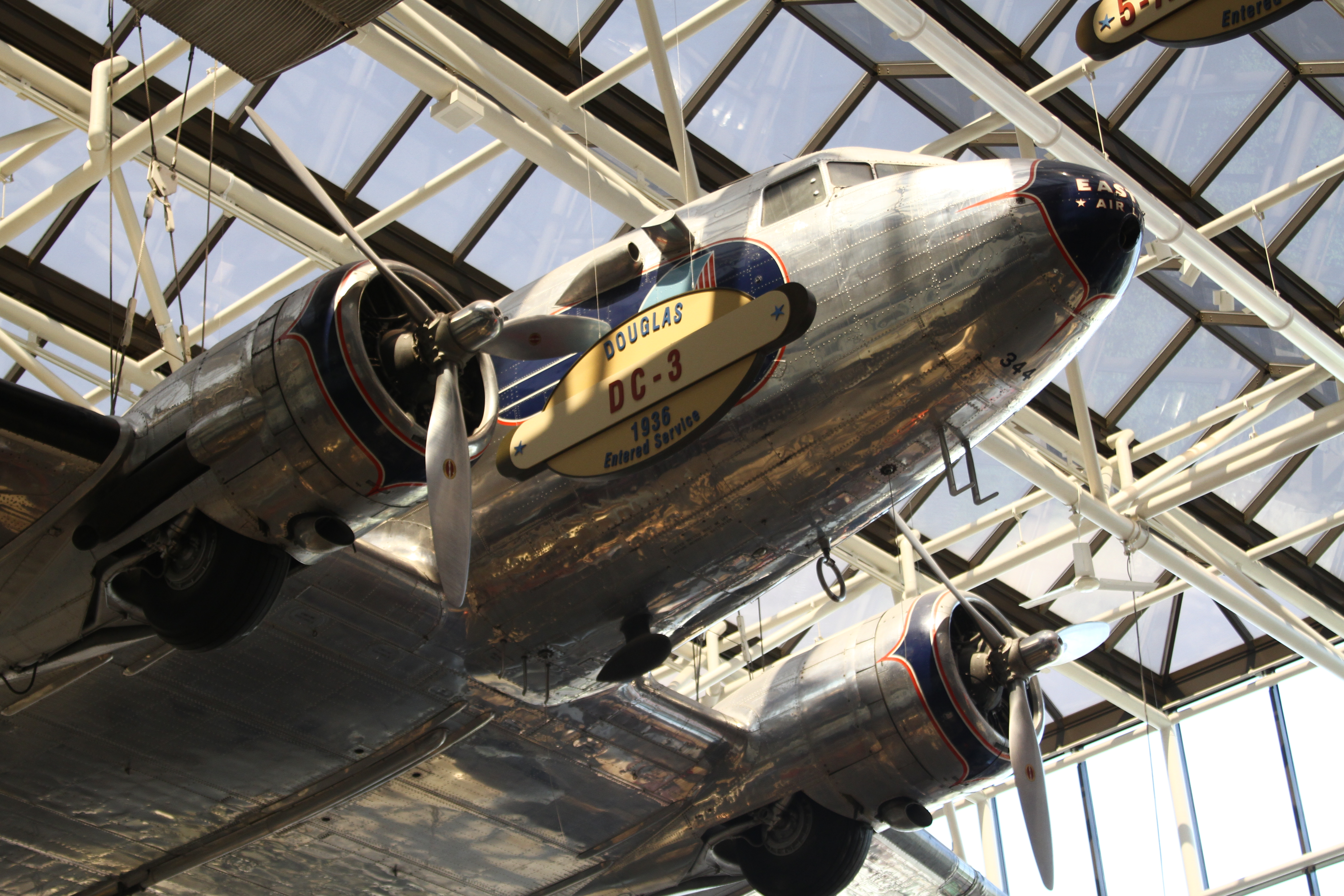
Douglas DC-3

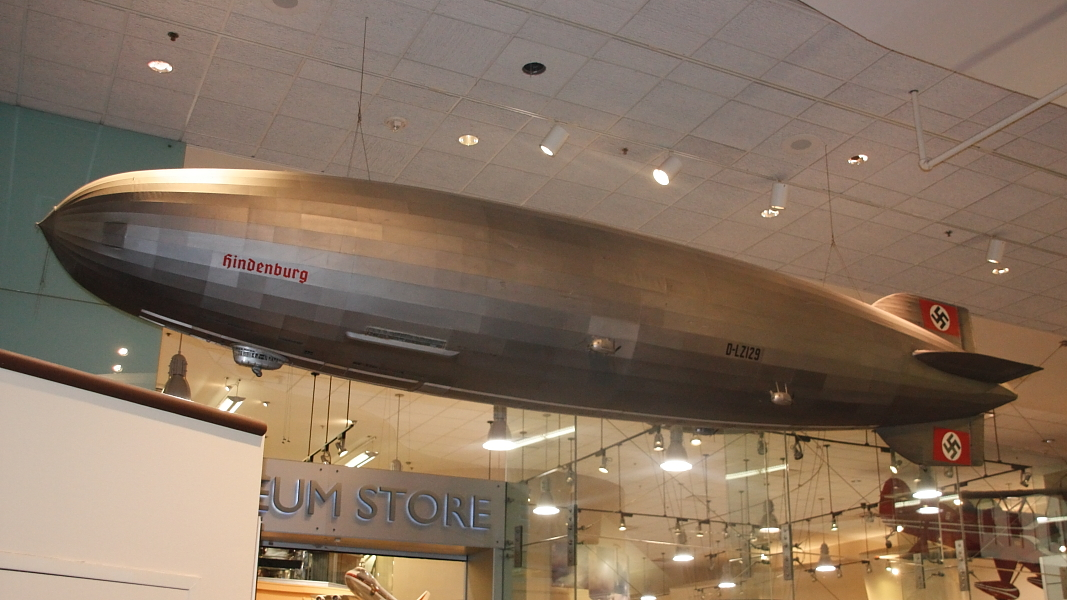
25-foot-long model of the LZ 129 Hindenburg used in the 1975 film The Hindenburg

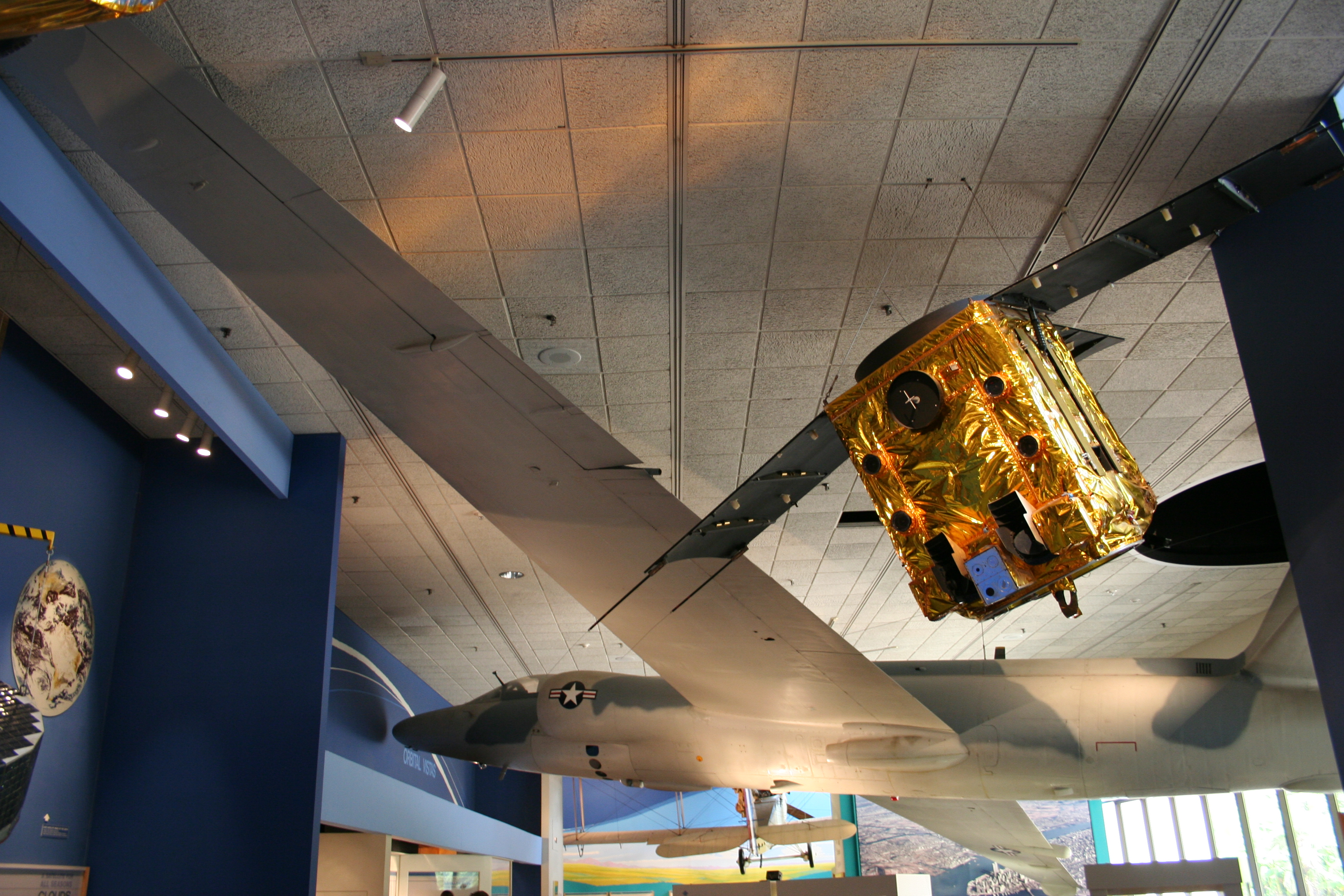
Lockheed U-2 and a spacecraft

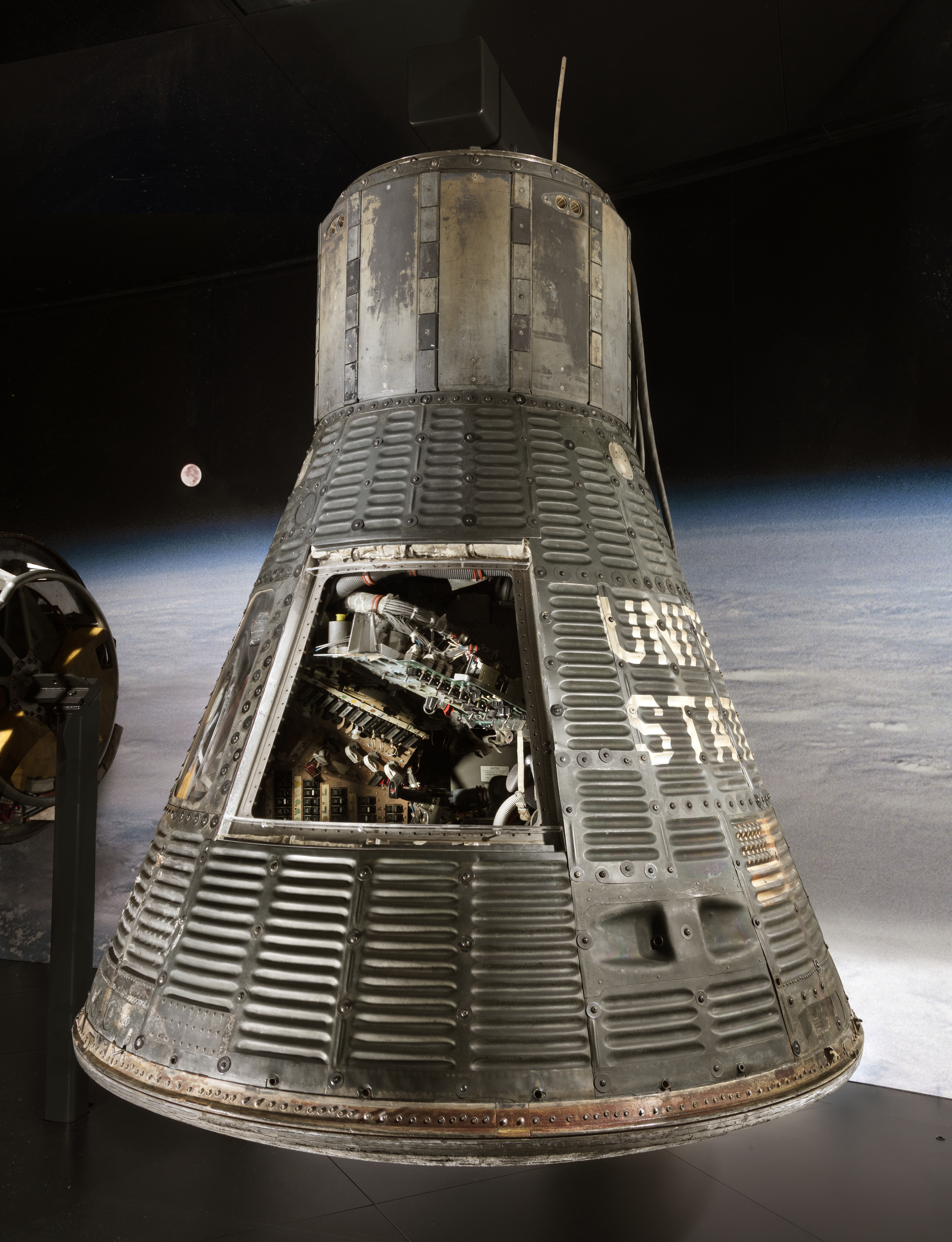
Mercury Friendship 7 spacecraft, first crewed American earth orbiter, 1962

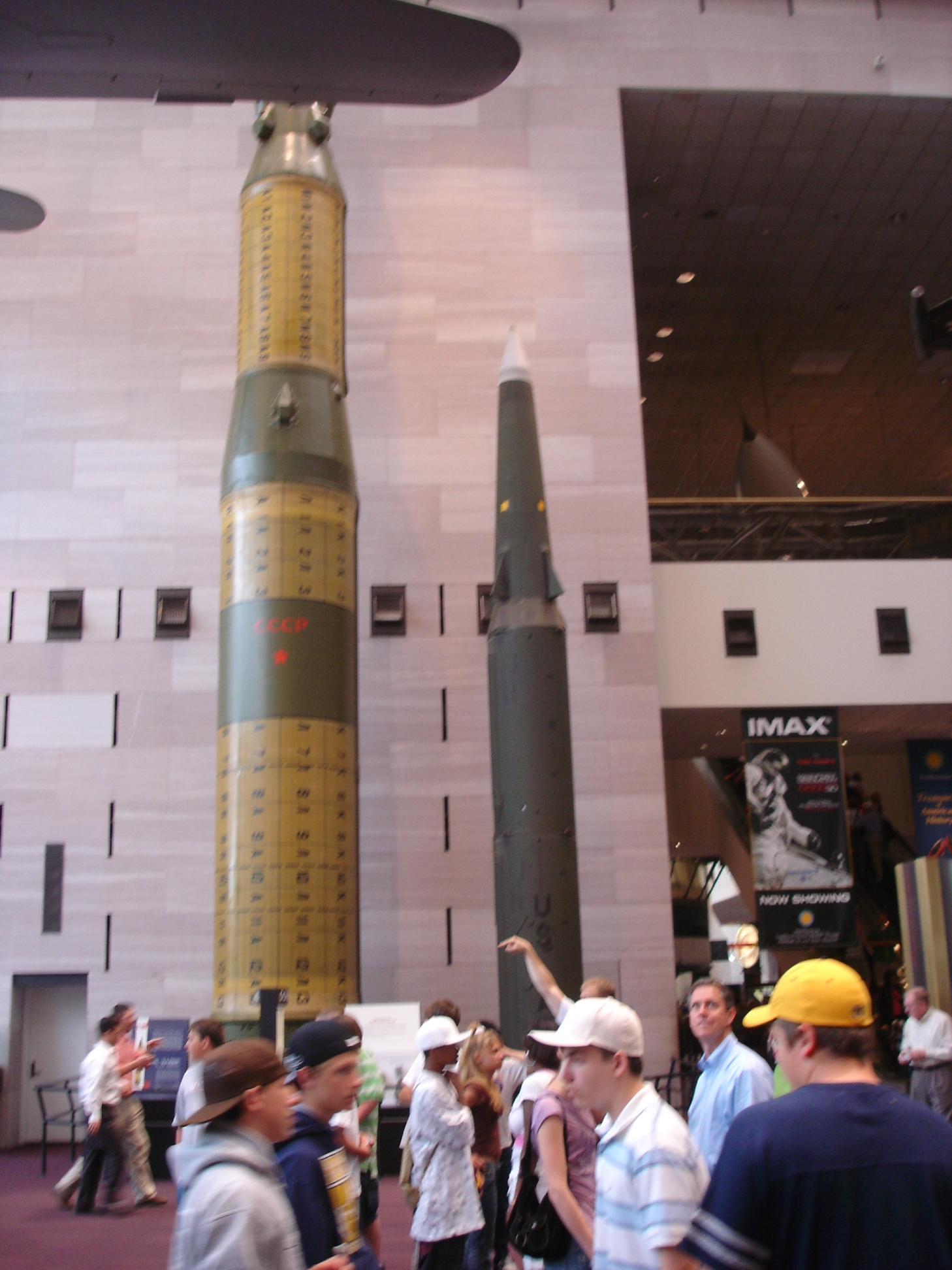
Missiles: Soviet SS-20 and U.S. Pershing II

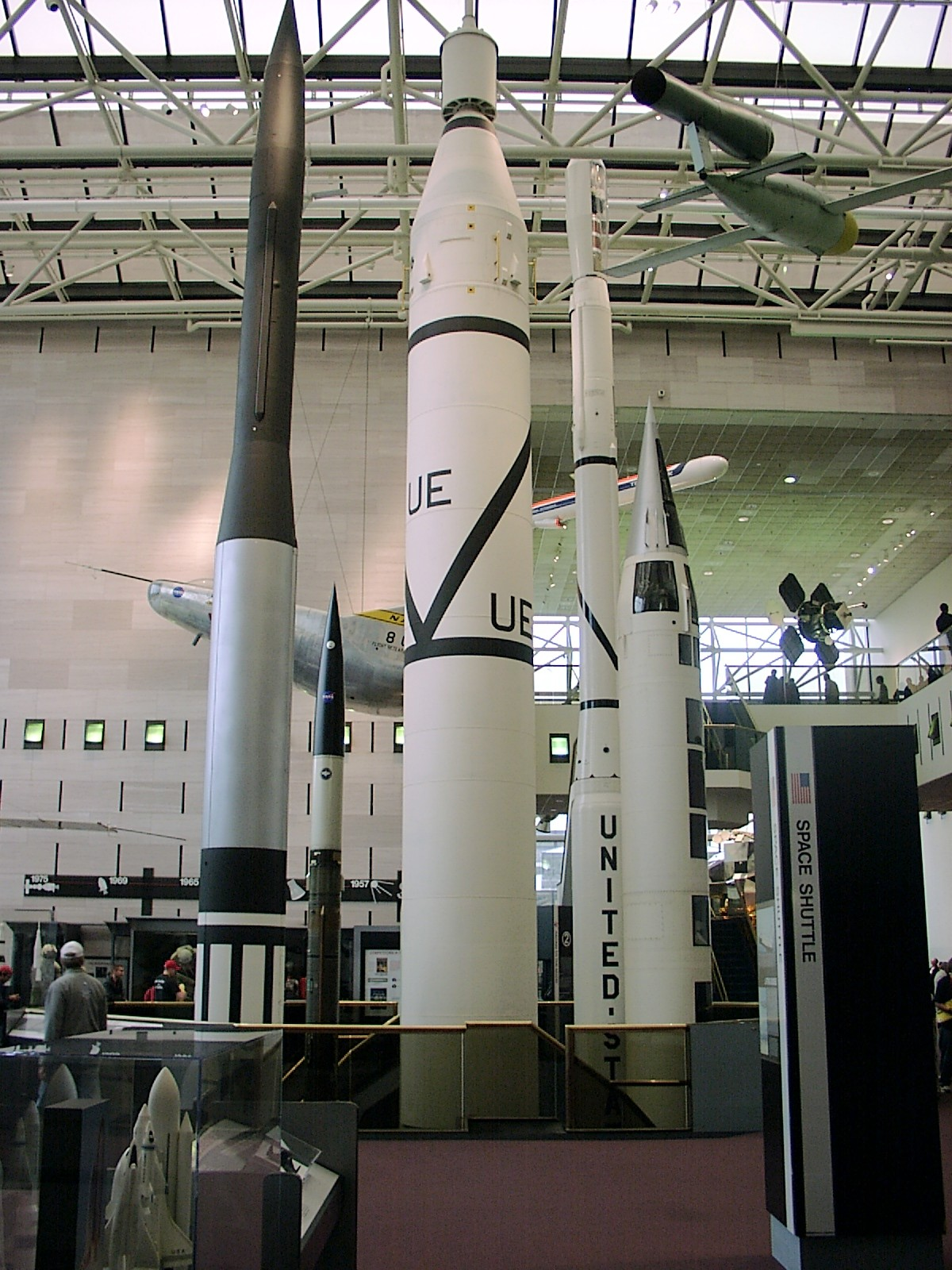
Ballistic missiles

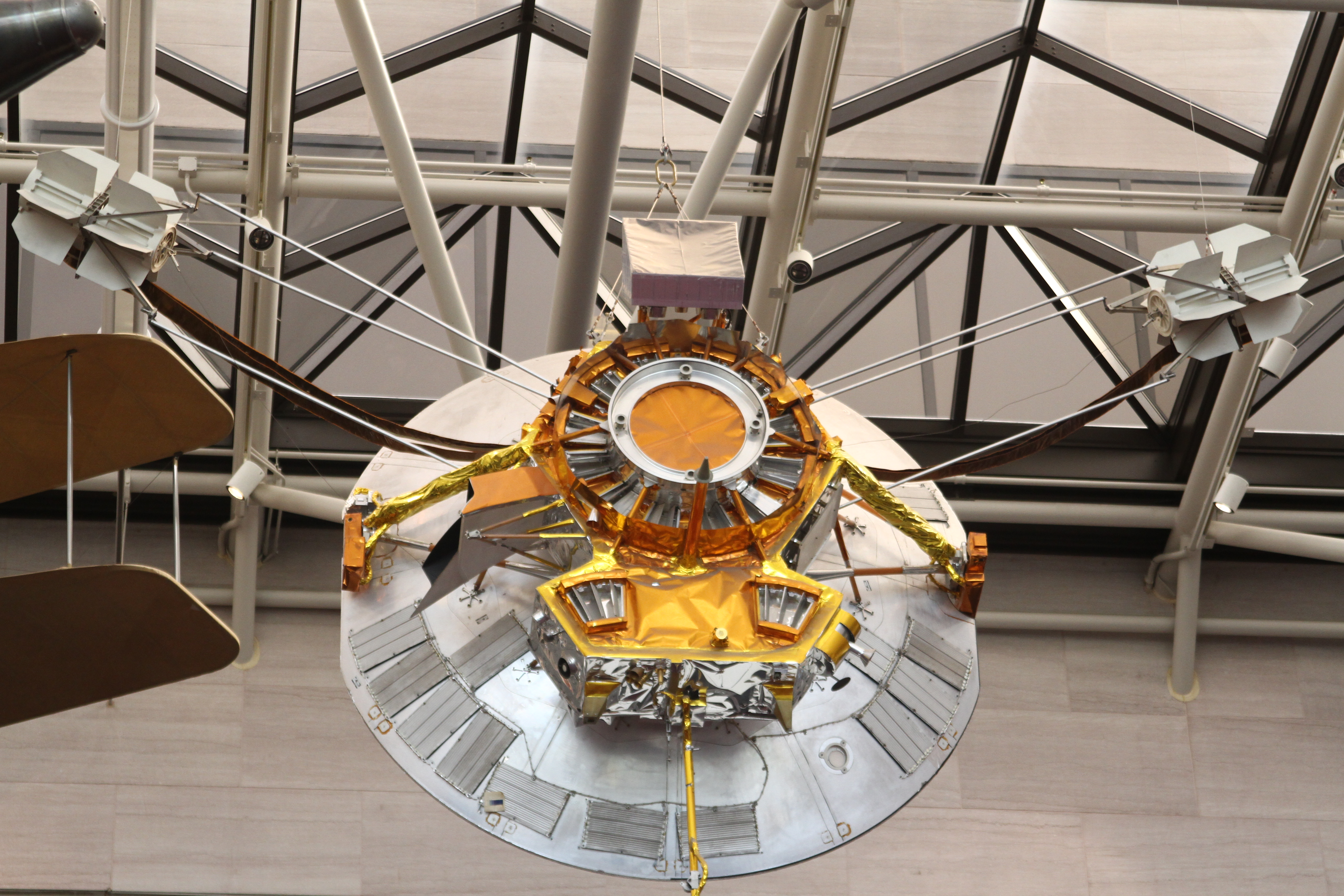
Pioneer H

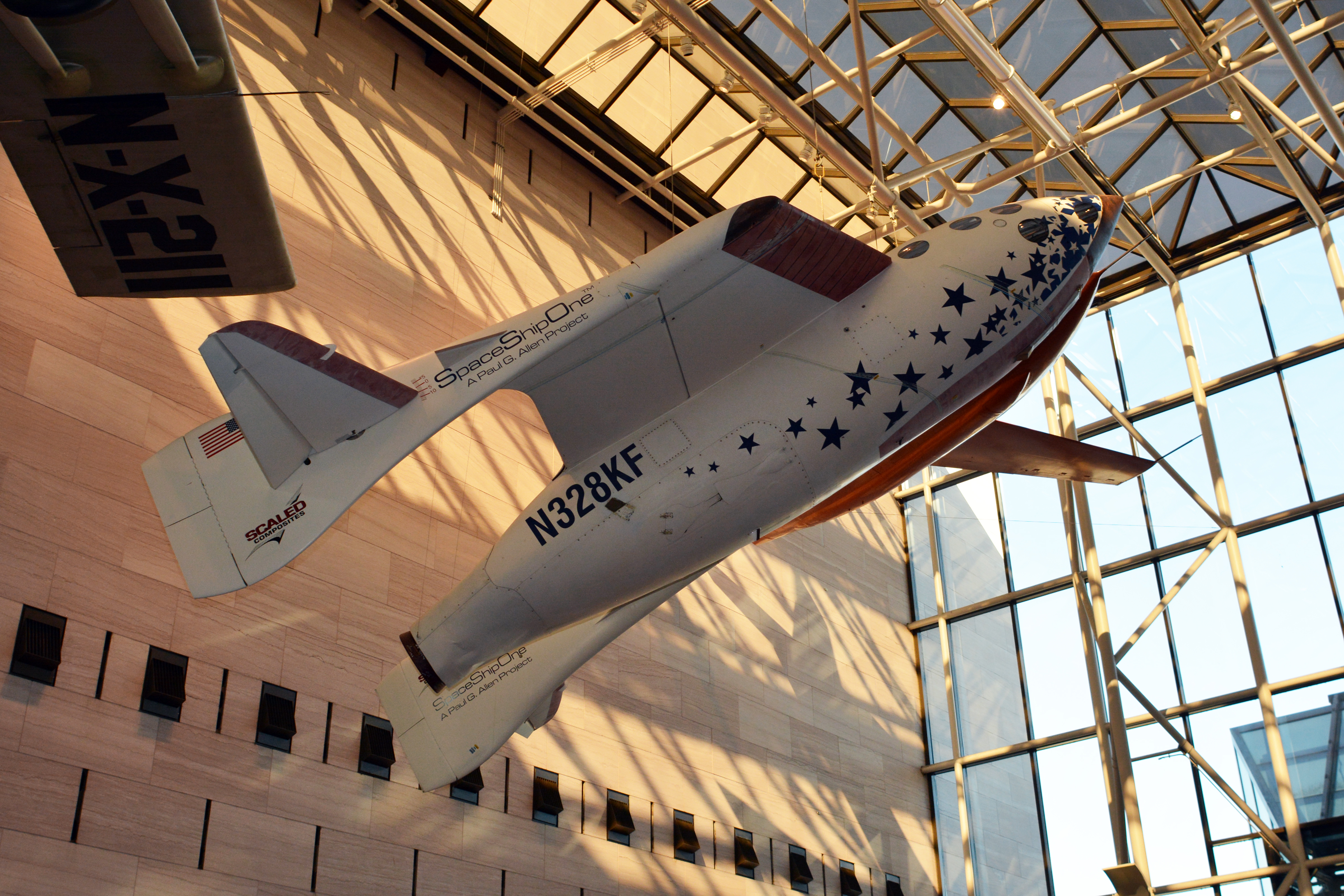
SpaceShipOne, first private space ship to carry a human crew (2004)

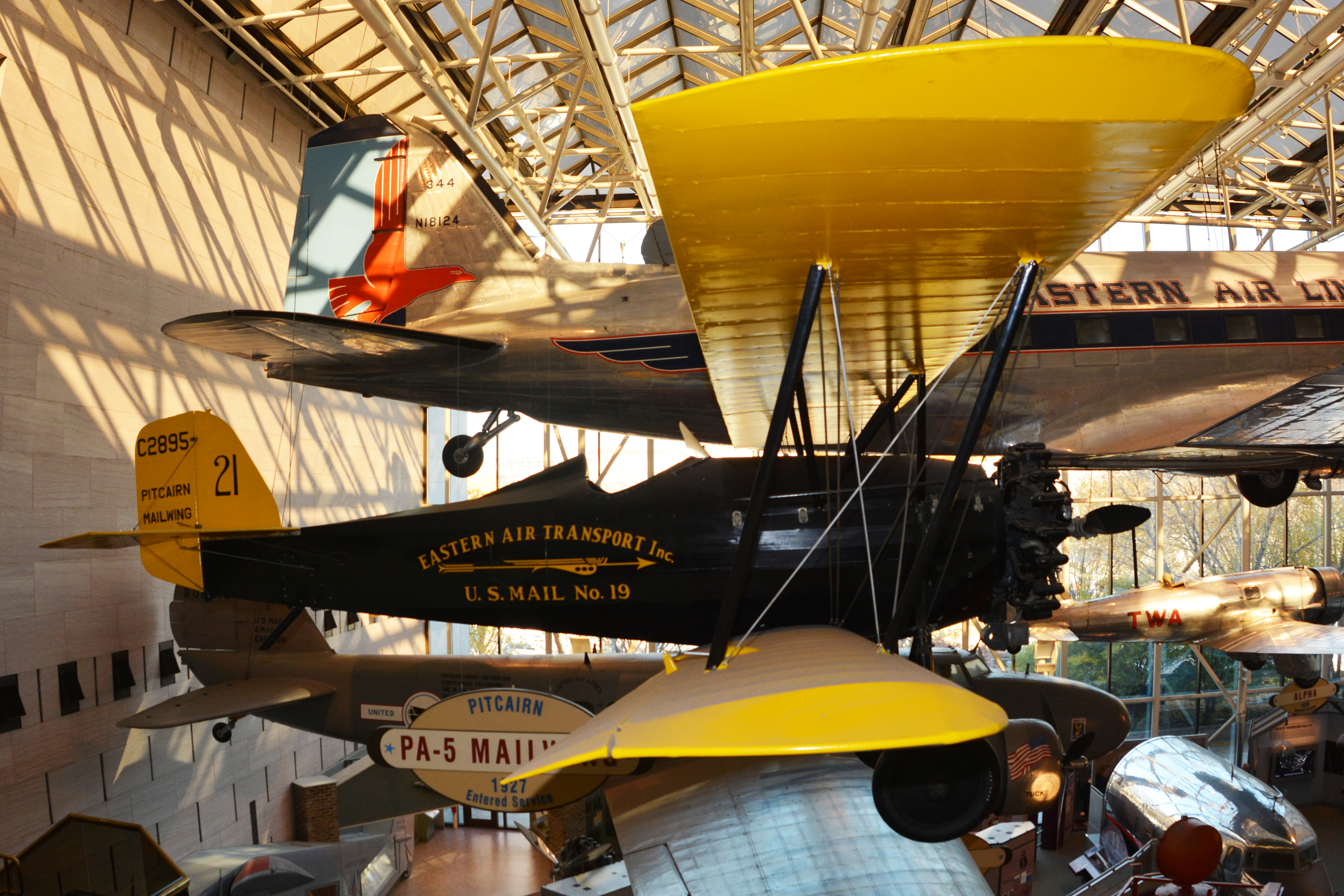
Pitcairn Mailwing

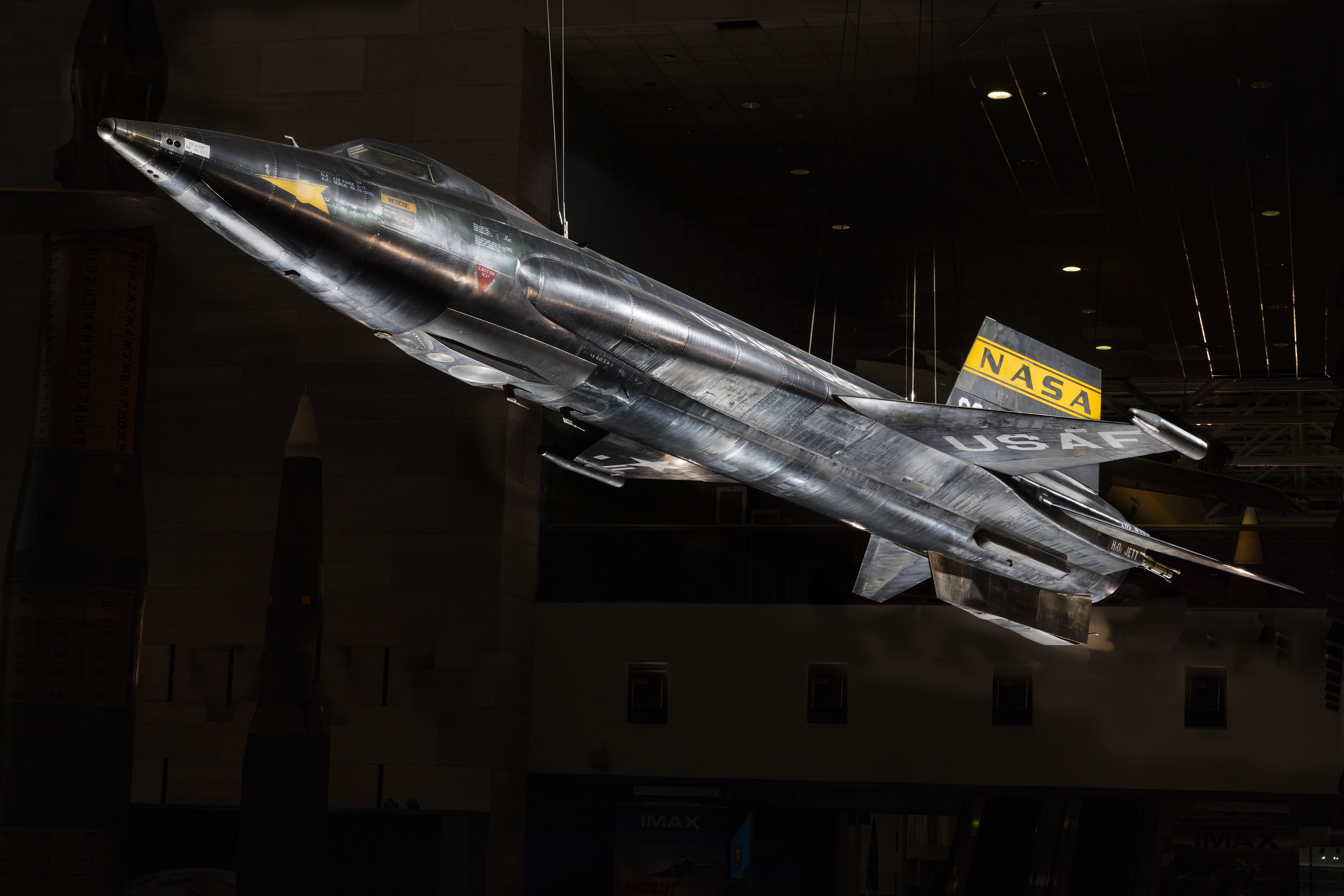
X-15

== Phoebe Waterman Haas Public Observatory ==
The Phoebe Waterman Haas Public Observatory opened its doors to the public in 2009 as part of the celebration of the International Year of Astronomy. It has a 16-inch Boller & Chivens telescope, a Sun Gun Telescope and hydrogen-alpha (red light, to see the chromosphere) and calcium-K (purple light) telescopes. The observatory opens to public from Wednesdays through Sundays from noon to 3 P.M. and is open about once a month at night time.

== Public programs and outreach ==
In 2014, the museum began a television show for middle school students, called STEM in 30. The show teaches students science, technology, engineering, math, art and history through artifacts at the museum and special guests from air and space history. The show is currently in its seventh season. The museum also has regular programs called What's New in Aerospace that feature special guests.

== Fellowships ==
The museum has four research fellowships: the Charles A. Lindbergh Chair in Aerospace History (also known as the Lindbergh Chair), the Daniel and Florence Guggenheim Fellowship, the Verville Fellowship, and the Postdoctoral Earth and Planetary Sciences Fellowship. The Lindbergh Chair is a one-year senior fellowship to assist a scholar in the research and composition of a book about aerospace history. Announced in 1977 at the 50th anniversary of Lindbergh's famous solo flight, 1978 was the first year that the Lindbergh Chair was occupied—British aviation historian Charles Harvard Gibbs-Smith was selected as the first recipient.

== See also ==
- Continuum, a sculpture that sits on the south side of the building entrance.
- Delta Solar, a sculpture that sits on the west side of the building.
- List of most-visited museums in the United States
- List of aerospace museums
- National Air and Space Museum Film Archive
- RKK Energiya museum, the museum's equivalent in Russia
- Tsiolkovsky State Museum of the History of Cosmonautics
- Architecture of Washington, D.C.
