= Sun Gun Telescope =

Type of solar telescope

The Sun Gun Telescope is a type of solar telescope designed so that large groups of people can view the Sun safely - in particular it was created as a way to encourage children to become interested in astronomy. With this safe and portable device, both amateur science enthusiasts and professionals alike can observe sun spots.

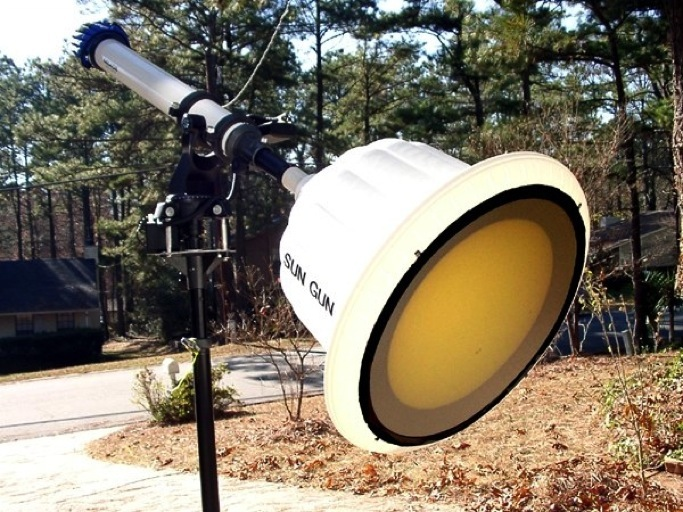
Sun Gun Telescope

It was featured in the August 1999 issue of Scientific American magazine. Bruce Hegerberg designed the Sun Gun from a 60 mm diameter 900 mm fl. optical tube which is mounted inside a 3-inch PVC which is in turn connected to a 20-inch plastic flower planter. A rear projection screen is then mounted on the top of the flower planter. The entire Sun Gun can be made from items easily found at most local hardware stores. The scope itself is an inexpensive 60mm refractor available from many sources.

== See also ==
- List of telescope types
