= List of minor planets named after people =

This is a list of minor planets named after people, both real and fictional.

== Scientists ==
=== Astronomers ===
==== Amateur ====
- 340 Eduarda (Heinrich Eduard von Lade, German)
- 792 Metcalfia (Joel Hastings Metcalf, American)
- 828 Lindemannia (Adolph Friedrich Lindemann, German-British)
- 1906 Naef (Robert Adolf Naef, Swiss)
- 1955 McMath (Robert Raynolds McMath, American)
- 2602 Moore (Sir Patrick Moore)
- 3184 Raab (Herbert Raab, Austrian)
- 3696 Herald (Dave Herald, Australian)
- 4143 Huziak (Richard Huziak, Canadian)
- 6822 Horálek (Petr Horálek, Czech)
- 9121 Stefanovalentini (Stefano Valentini, Italian)
- 10003 Caryhuang (Cary Huang, Chinese-American)
- 12787 Abetadashi (Tadashi Abe, Japanese)
- 13624 Abeosamu (Osamu Abe, Japanese)
- 16217 Peterbroughton (Peter Broughton, Canadian)
- 22406 Garyboyle (Gary Boyle, Canadian)
- 23771 Emaitchar (Martin H. Robinson, British)
- 24898 Alanholmes (Alan W. Holmes, American)
- 29483 Boeker (Karolin Kleemann-Boeker and Andreas Boeker, German)
- 32622 Yuewaichun (Wai Chun Yue, Hongkonger)
- 33748 Davegault (Dave Gault, Australian)
- 35461 Mazzucato (Michele T. Mazzucato, Italian)
- 37729 Akiratakao (Akira Takao, Japanese)
- 49109 Agnesraab (Agnes Raab, Austrian)
- 60406 Albertosuci (Alberto Suci, Italian)
- 103422 Laurisirén (Lauri Sirén, Finnish)
- 117032 Davidlane (Dave Lane, Canadian)
- 144907 Whitehorne (Mary Lou Whitehorne, Canadian)
- 161693 Attilladanko (Attilla Danko, Canadian)
- 171153 Allanrahill (Allan Rahill, Canadian)
- 260235 Attwood (Randy Attwood, Canadian)
- 263906 Yuanfengfang (Fengfang Yuan, Chinese)
- 367732 Mikesimonsen (Mike Simonsen, American)
- 714378 Char (Farid Char, Chilean)

==== Professional ====
- 107 Camilla (Camille Flammarion; also Camilla, mythological Volscian queen)
- 162 Laurentia (Joseph Jean Pierre Laurent)
- 238 Hypatia (Hypatia)
- 281 Lucretia (Caroline Lucretia Herschel)
- 339 Dorothea (Dorothea Klumpke)
- 349 Dembowska (Ercole Dembowski)
- 366 Vincentina (Vincenzo Cerulli)
- 511 Davida (David Peck Todd)
- 676 Melitta (Philibert Jacques Melotte)
- 729 Watsonia (James Craig Watson)
- 761 Brendelia (Martin Brendel)
- 767 Bondia (William Cranch Bond and George Phillips Bond)
- 768 Struveana (Otto Wilhelm von Struve, Friedrich Georg Wilhelm von Struve and Karl Hermann Struve)
- 784 Pickeringia (Edward Charles Pickering and William Henry Pickering)
- 786 Bredichina (Fyodor Aleksandrovich Bredikhin)
- 806 Gyldenia (Hugo Gyldén)
- 818 Kapteynia (Jacobus Kapteyn)
- 819 Barnardiana (Edward Emerson Barnard)
- 827 Wolfiana (Max Wolf)
- 834 Burnhamia (Sherburne Wesley Burnham)
- 854 Frostia (Edwin Brant Frost)
- 855 Newcombia (Simon Newcomb)
- 856 Backlunda (Oskar Backlund)
- 857 Glasenappia (Sergey Glazenap)
- 872 Holda (Edward S. Holden)
- 892 Seeligeria (Hugo von Seeliger)
- 914 Palisana (Johann Palisa)
- 993 Moultona (Forest Ray Moulton)
- 995 Sternberga (Pavel Shternberg)
- 999 Zachia (Franz Xaver, Baron von Zach)
- 1000 Piazzia (Giuseppe Piazzi, discoverer of the asteroid 1 Ceres)
- 1002 Olbersia (Heinrich Wilhelm Matthäus Olbers)
- 1004 Belopolskya (Aristarkh Belopolsky)
- 1021 Flammario (Camille Flammarion)
- 1024 Hale (George Ellery Hale)
- 1040 Klumpkea (Dorothea Klumpke)
- 1111 Reinmuthia (Karl Wilhelm Reinmuth)
- 1120 Cannonia (Annie Jump Cannon)
- 1123 Shapleya (Harlow Shapley)
- 1129 Neujmina (Grigory Neujmin)
- 1134 Kepler (Johannes Kepler)
- 1186 Turnera (Herbert Hall Turner)
- 1215 Boyer (Louis Boyer)
- 1239 Queteleta (Adolphe Quetelet)
- 1241 Dysona (Sir Frank Watson Dyson)
- 1303 Luthera (Karl Theodor Robert Luther)
- 1322 Coppernicus (Nicolaus Copernicus)
- 1412 Lagrula (Joanny-Philippe Lagrula)
- 1455 Mitchella (Maria Mitchell)
- 1501 Baade (Walter Baade)
- 1510 Charlois (Auguste Charlois)
- 1529 Oterma (Liisi Oterma)
- 1539 Borrelly (Alphonse Louis Nicolas Borrelly)
- 1551 Argelander (Friedrich Wilhelm Argelander)
- 1573 Väisälä (Yrjö Väisälä)
- 1578 Kirkwood (Daniel Kirkwood)
- 1591 Baize (Paul Baize)
- 1594 Danjon (André-Louis Danjon)
- 1600 Vyssotsky (Emma T. R. Williams Vyssotsky)
- 1601 Patry (André Patry)
- 1614 Goldschmidt (Hermann Mayer Salomon Goldschmidt)
- 1622 Chacornac (Jean Chacornac)
- 1637 Swings (Pol Swings)
- 1642 Hill (George William Hill)
- 1655 Comas Solà (Josep Comas Solá)
- 1677 Tycho Brahe (Tycho Brahe)
- 1686 De Sitter (Willem de Sitter)
- 1691 Oort (Jan Oort)
- 1693 Hertzsprung (Ejnar Hertzsprung)
- 1714 Sy (Frédéric Sy)
- 1741 Giclas (Henry L. Giclas)
- 1743 Schmidt (Bernhard Schmidt)
- 1745 Ferguson (James Ferguson)
- 1761 Edmondson (Frank K. Edmondson)
- 1766 Slipher (V. M. Slipher and E. C. Slipher)
- 1776 Kuiper (Gerard Kuiper)
- 1778 Alfvén (Hannes Olof Gösta Alfvén)
- 1780 Kippes (Otto Kippes)
- 1803 Zwicky (Fritz Zwicky)
- 1830 Pogson (Norman Robert Pogson)
- 1831 Nicholson (Seth Barnes Nicholson)
- 1832 Mrkos (Antonín Mrkos)
- 1846 Bengt (Bengt Strömgren)
- 1850 Kohoutek (Luboš Kohoutek)
- 1851 Lacroute (Pierre Lacroute French astronomer)
- 1877 Marsden (Brian G. Marsden)
- 1886 Lowell (Percival Lowell)
- 1896 Beer (Wilhelm Beer)
- 1913 Sekanina (Zdeněk Sekanina)
- 1940 Whipple (Fred Lawrence Whipple)
- 1965 van de Kamp (Peter van de Kamp)
- 1983 Bok (Bart Bok)
- 1995 Hajek (Tadeáš Hájek)
- 1998 Titius (Johann Daniel Titius)
- 1999 Hirayama (Kiyotsugu Hirayama)
- 2000 Herschel (William Herschel)
- 2003 Harding (Karl Ludwig Harding)
- 2005 Hencke (Karl Ludwig Hencke)
- 2012 Guo Shou-Jing (Guo Shoujing)
- 2018 Schuster (Hans-Emil Schuster)
- 2069 Hubble (Edwin Hubble)
- 2074 Shoemaker (Eugene Shoemaker)
- 2097 Galle (Johann Gottfried Galle)
- 2099 Öpik (Ernst Julius Öpik)
- 2126 Gerasimovich (Boris Gerasimovich)
- 2136 Jugta (Jay U. Gunter)
- 2165 Young (Charles Augustus Young)
- 2198 Ceplecha (Zdeněk Ceplecha)
- 2227 Otto Struve (Otto Struve)
- 2234 Schmadel (Lutz Schmadel)
- 2281 Biela (Wilhelm von Biela)
- 2308 Schilt (Jan Schilt)
- 2325 Chernykh (Lyudmila Ivanovna Chernykh and Nikolai Stepanovich Chernykh)
- 2383 Bradley (James Bradley)
- 2439 Ulugbek (Ulugh Beg)
- 2635 Huggins (William Huggins)
- 2646 Abetti (Antonio Abetti and Giorgio Abetti)
- 2650 Elinor (Elinor Gates, American astronomer)
- 2688 Halley (Edmond Halley)
- 2709 Sagan (Carl Sagan)
- 2751 Campbell (William Wallace Campbell)
- 2772 Dugan (Raymond Smith Dugan)
- 2780 Monnig (Oscar Monnig)
- 2801 Huygens (Christiaan Huygens)
- 2813 Zappalà (Vincenzo Zappalà)
- 2842 Unsöld (Albrecht Unsöld)
- 2849 Shklovskij (Iosif Shklovsky)
- 2874 Jim Young (James Whitney Young)
- 2875 Lagerkvist (Claes-Ingvar Lagerkvist)
- 2897 Ole Römer (Ole Rømer)
- 2900 Luboš Perek (Luboš Perek)
- 2917 Sawyer Hogg (Helen Battles Sawyer Hogg)
- 2996 Bowman (Fred N. Bowman)
- 3070 Aitken (Robert Grant Aitken)
- 3078 Horrocks (Jeremiah Horrocks)
- 3095 Omarkhayyam (Omar Khayyám)
- 3115 Baily (Francis Baily)
- 3116 Goodricke (John Goodricke)
- 3123 Dunham (David Waring Dunham)
- 3169 Ostro (Steven J. Ostro)
- 3174 Alcock (George Alcock)
- 3216 Harrington (Robert Sutton Harrington)
- 3236 Strand (Kaj Aage Gunnar Strand)
- 3255 Tholen (David J Tholen)
- 3267 Glo (Eleanor "Glo" Helin)
- 3277 Aaronson (Marc Aaronson)
- 3282 Spencer Jones (Harold Spencer Jones)
- 3299 Hall (Asaph Hall)
- 3337 Miloš (Miloš Tichý)
- 3449 Abell (George O. Abell)
- 3467 Bernheim (Robert Burnham Jr.)
- 3487 Edgeworth (Kenneth Edgeworth)
- 3506 French (Linda M. French)
- 3507 Vilas (Faith Vilas)
- 3545 Gaffey (Michael James Gaffey American Geologist)
- 3549 Hapke (Bruce William Hapke)
- 3594 Scotti (James V. Scotti)
- 3673 Levy (David H. Levy)
- 3722 Urata (Takeshi Urata)
- 3808 Tempel (Ernst Wilhelm Leberecht Tempel)
- 3847 Šindel (Jan Šindel)
- 3866 Langley (Samuel Pierpont Langley)
- 3936 Elst (Eric Walter Elst)
- 3962 Valyaev (Valerij Valyaev)
- 3999 Aristarchus (Aristarchus of Samos)
- 4000 Hipparchus (Hipparchus)
- 4001 Ptolemaeus (Ptolemy)
- 4037 Ikeya (Kaoru Ikeya)
- 4062 Schiaparelli (Giovanni Schiaparelli)
- 4064 Marjorie (Marjorie Meinel)
- 4151 Alanhale (Alan Hale)
- 4169 Celsius (Anders Celsius)
- 4279 De Gasparis (Annibale de Gasparis)
- 4298 Jorgenúnez (Jorge Núñez, Spanish astronomer)
- 4364 Shkodrov (Vladimir Georgiev Shkodrov)
- 4367 Meech (Karen Jean Meech)
- 4549 Burkhardt (Gernot Burkhardt)
- 4567 Bečvář (Antonín Bečvář)
- 4587 Rees (Martin Rees, Baron Rees of Ludlow)
- 4593 Reipurth (Bo Reipurth, Danish astronomer)
- 4602 Heudier (Jean-Louis Heudier, Français)
- 4713 Steel (Duncan Steel)
- 4790 Petrpravec (Petr Pravec)
- 4859 Fraknoi (Andrew Fraknoi)
- 4866 Badillo (Fr. Victor L. Badillo, Jesuit astronomer and former director of the Manila Observatory)
- 5035 Swift (Lewis Swift)
- 5036 Tuttle (Horace Parnell Tuttle)
- 5080 Oja (Tarmo Oja)
- 5100 Pasachoff (Jay Pasachoff)
- 5392 Parker (Donald C. Parker)
- 5430 Luu (Jane Luu)
- 5540 Smirnova (Tamara Mikhaylovna Smirnova)
- 5655 Barney (Ida Barney)
- 5704 Schumacher (Heinrich Christian Schumacher)
- 5726 Rubin (Vera Rubin)
- 5757 Tichá (Jana Tichá)
- 5826 Bradstreet (David Bradstreet)
- 5943 Lovi (George Lovi, astronomical columnist and planetarium educator)
- 6006 Anaximandros (Anaximander)
- 6075 Zajtsev (Alexander L. Zaitsev)
- 6076 Plavec (Miroslav Plavec)
- 6391 Africano (John L. Africano)
- 6398 Timhunter (Tim Hunter)
- 6696 Eubanks (Marshall Eubanks)
- 6779 Perrine (Charles Dillon Perrine)
- 7086 Bopp (Thomas Bopp)
- 7291 Hyakutake (Yuji Hyakutake)
- 7359 Messier (Charles Messier)
- 7948 Whitaker (Ewen A. Whitaker)
- 8068 Vishnureddy (Vishnu Reddy Indian Astronomer)
- 8140 Hardersen (Paul Hardersen, American Astronomer/Planetary Scientist)
- 8216 Melosh (H. Jay Melosh)
- 8391 Kring (David A. Kring)
- 8408 Strom (Robert G. Strom)
- 8558 Hack (Margherita Hack)
- 8690 Swindle (Timothy D. Swindle)
- 8785 Boltwood (Paul Boltwood)
- 9122 Hunten (Donald M. Hunten)
- 9133 d'Arrest (Heinrich Louis d'Arrest)
- 9134 Encke (Johann Franz Encke)
- 9207 Petersmith (Peter H. Smith)
- 9494 Donici (Nicolae Donici, Romanian astronomer)
- 9531 Jean-Luc (Jean-Luc Margot)
- 10633 Akimasa (Akimasa Nakamura, Japanese astronomer)
- 10689 Pinillaalonso (Noemi Pinilla-Alonso, Spaniard astronomer/Planetary Scientist)
- 10950 Albertjansen (Albert Jansen, German astronomer)
- 10969 Perryman (Michael Perryman, British astronomer)
- 11156 Al-Khwarismi (Muḥammad ibn Mūsā al-Khwārizmī, Persian astronomer)
- 11577 Einasto (Jaan Einasto)
- 11695 Mattei (Janet Akyüz Mattei, Turkish-American astronomer)
- 11755 Paczynski (Bohdan Paczyński, Polish astronomer)
- 11762 Vogel (Hermann Carl Vogel)
- 12621 Alsufi (Abd al-Rahman al-Sufi / Azophi, Persian astronomer)
- 12742 Delisle (Joseph-Nicolas Delisle)
- 14120 Espenak (Fred Espenak)
- 14124 Kamil (Kamil Hornoch)
- 14322 Shakura (Nikolai Ivanovich Shakura)
- 14335 Alexosipov (Alexandr Kuzmich Osipov, Russian-Ukrainian astronomer)
- 14825 Fieber-Beyer (Sherry Fieber-Beyer, American Astronomer/Planetary Scientist)
- 15395 Rükl (Antonín Rükl)
- 15420 Aedouglass (Andrew Ellicott Douglass, American astronomer)
- 15467 Aflorsch (Alphonse Florsch, French astronomer)
- 15955 Johannesgmunden (John of Gmunden)
- 15963 Koeberl (Christian Koeberl)
- 16682 Donati (Giovanni Battista Donati)
- 18150 Lopez-Moreno (José J. Lopez-Moreno, Spanish astronomer)
- 18243 Gunn (James Edward Gunn, American astronomer)
- 19139 Apian (Peter Apian)
- 19875 Guedes (Leandro Guedes, Brazilian Astronomer)
- 24988 Alainmilsztajn (Alain Milsztajn, French astronomer)
- 28751 Eggl (Siegfried Eggl, Austrian/American astronomer and aerospace engineer, University of Illinois at Urbana-Champaign)
- 30785 Greeley (Ronald Greeley, American Planetary Geologist, Regents' Professor, Arizona State University Tempe, Arizona
- 32200 Seiicyoshida (Seiichi Yoshida, Japanese astronomer)
- 36445 Smalley (Kyle E. Smalley)
- 45692 Poshyachinda (Saran Poshyachinda, Thai astronomer, former executive director of the National Astronomical Research Institute of Thailand)
- 62701 Davidrankin (David Rankin, American astronomer)
- 68730 Straizys (Vytautas Straižys, Lithuanian astronomer, the founder of Vilnius photometric system)
- 72021 Yisunji (Yi, Sunji, Korean astronomer in the 15th century)
- 92893 Michaelperson (Michael Person, American astronomer)
- 95593 Azusienis (Algimantas Ažusienis, Lithuanian astronomer)
- 99503 Leewonchul (Lee, Wonchul, Korean astronomer)
- 106817 Yubangtaek (Yu, Bangtaek, Korean astronomer in the 13th century)
- 133008 Snedden (Stephanie Snedden, American astronomer)
- 135979 Allam (Sahar Allam, Egyptian astronomer)
- 163640 Newberg (Heidi Jo Newberg, American astronomer)
- 165347 Philplait (Phil Plait, American astronomer, known as TheBadAstronomer)
- 170010 Szalay (Alex Szalay, American astronomer)
- 170022 Douglastucker (Douglas Tucker, American astronomer)
- 234750 Amymainzer (Amy Mainzer, American astronomer)
- 260906 Robichon (Noël Robichon, French astronomer)
- 265380 Terzan (Agop Terzan, Turkish-French astronomer of Armenian descent)
- 347940 Jorgezuluaga (Jorge I. Zuluaga Callejas, Colombian astronomer)
- 738926 Nitschelm (Christian Nitschelm, French-born Chilean astronomer)

==== Planetarium directors ====
- 4897 Tomhamilton (Thomas William Hamilton, American astronomer, author, and planetarium director)
- 9108 Toruyusa (Toru Yusa, Japanese planetarium director and comet chaser)
- 13123 Tyson (Neil deGrasse Tyson, American astronomer and planetarium director)
- 17601 Sheldonschafer (Sheldon Schafer, Professor of astronomy and Director of the Riverview Museum Planetarium, Peoria, Illinois)
- 244888 Bunton (George W. Bunton, Jr., American astronomer, educator, and planetarium director)

==== Relatives of astronomers ====
- 42 Isis (Elizabeth Isis Pogson, daughter of the astronomer Norman Robert Pogson; also Ancient Egyptian goddess Isis)
- 87 Sylvia (Sylvie Petiaux-Hugo Flammarion, first wife of the astronomer Camille Flammarion; also Rhea Sylvia, the mythical mother of the twins Romulus and Remus)
- 153 Hilda (Hilda von Oppolzer, daughter of the astronomer Theodor von Oppolzer)
- 154 Bertha (Berthe Martin-Flammarion, sister of the astronomer Camille Flammarion)
- 1280 Baillauda (Jules Baillaud, son of the astronomer Benjamin Baillaud)
- 1563 Noël (Emanuel Arend, son of the astronomer Sylvain Julien Victor Arend)
- 3664 Anneres (Anna Theresia ("Anneres") Schmadel, the wife of astronomer Lutz Schmadel)
- 68109 Naomipasachoff (Naomi Pasachoff, a science writer and educator, and wife of astronomer Jay Pasachoff of Williams College 5100 Pasachoff)

=== Biologists ===
- 1991 Darwin (Charles Darwin, an English naturalist, geologist and biologist)
- 2496 Fernandus (Fernandus Payne, zoologist)
- 2766 Leeuwenhoek (Anton van Leeuwenhoek, pioneering cell biologist)
- 4804 Pasteur (Louis Pasteur, father of microbiology)
- 7412 Linnaeus (Carl Linnaeus, father of modern taxonomy)
- 8357 O'Connor (J. Dennis O'Connor, biological scientist and provost at the Smithsonian Institution)
- 9364 Clusius (Carolus Clusius, botanist)
- 15565 Benjaminsteele (Benjamin Steele, biologist)

=== Cartographers ===
- 4798 Mercator (Gerardus Mercator)
- 19139 Apian (Peter Apian)

=== Chemists ===
- 1449 Virtanen (Artturi Ilmari Virtanen)
- 2143 Jimarnold (James R. Arnold)
- 2638 Gadolin (Johan Gadolin)
- 2769 Mendeleev (Dmitri Mendeleev, father of the periodic table of the chemical elements)
- 3069 Heyrovský (Jaroslav Heyrovský)
- 3605 Davy (Humphry Davy)
- 3676 Hahn (Otto Hahn), father of nuclear chemistry
- 3899 Wichterle (Otto Wichterle)
- 4564 Clayton (Robert Clayton)
- 4674 Pauling (Linus Pauling)
- 4716 Urey (Harold Urey)
- 4856 Seaborg (Glenn T. Seaborg)
- 5697 Arrhenius (Svante Arrhenius)
- 6032 Nobel (Alfred Nobel)
- 6826 Lavoisier (Antoine Lavoisier)
- 9680 Molina (Mario Molina)
- 11967 Boyle (Robert Boyle)
- 12292 Dalton (John Dalton)

=== Computer scientists and programmers ===
- 9121 Stefanovalentini (Stefano Valentini)
- 9793 Torvalds (Linus Torvalds)
- 9882 Stallman (Richard M. Stallman)
- 21656 Knuth (Donald Knuth)
- 27433 Hylak (Benjamin Hylak)
- 90479 Donalek (Ciro Donalek)
- 132718 Kemény (John George Kemeny)
- 294727 Dennisritchie (Dennis Ritchie)
- 300909 Kenthompson (Ken Thompson)

=== Mathematicians ===
- 187 Lamberta (Johann Heinrich Lambert)
- 843 Nicolaia (Thorvald Nicolai Thiele)
- 1001 Gaussia (Carl Friedrich Gauss)
- 1005 Arago (François Arago)
- 1006 Lagrangea (Joseph-Louis Lagrange)
- 1552 Bessel (Friedrich Bessel)
- 1858 Lobachevskij (Nikolai Lobachevsky)
- 1859 Kovalevskaya (Sofia Kovalevskaya)
- 1888 Zu Chong-Zhi (Zu Chongzhi)
- 1996 Adams (John Couch Adams)
- 1997 Leverrier (Urbain Le Verrier)
- 2002 Euler (Leonhard Euler)
- 2010 Chebyshev (Pafnuti Chebyshev)
- 2587 Gardner (Martin Gardner)
- 3251 Eratosthenes (Eratosthenes)
- 3600 Archimedes (Archimedes)
- 4283 Stöffler (Johannes Stöffler)
- 4354 Euclides (Euclid)
- 4628 Laplace (Pierre-Simon Laplace)
- 5956 d'Alembert (Jean le Rond d'Alembert)
- 6143 Pythagoras (Pythagoras)
- 6765 Fibonacci (Leonardo Fibonacci of Pisa)
- 7057 Al-Fārābī (Al-Farabi, scientist, cosmologist, mathematician and music scholar)
- 7058 Al-Ṭūsī (Sharaf al-Dīn al-Ṭūsī, Persian mathematician)
- 7655 Adamries (Adam Ries, German mathematician)
- 8128 Nicomachus (Nicomachus, ancient Greek mathematician)
- 9689 Freudenthal (Hans Freudenthal)
- 9936 Al-Biruni (Abū Rayḥān al-Bīrūnī, Persian mathematician)
- 9999 Wiles (Andrew Wiles)
- 11156 Al-Khwarismi (Muḥammad ibn Mūsā al-Khwārizmī, Persian mathematician)
- 12493 Minkowski (Hermann Minkowski)
- 13498 Al Chwarizmi (Muḥammad ibn Mūsā al-Khwārizmī, Persian mathematician)
- 14100 Weierstrass (Karl Weierstrass)
- 16765 Agnesi (Maria Gaetana Agnesi)
- 16856 Banach (Stefan Banach)
- 19139 Apian (Peter Apian)
- 27500 Mandelbrot (Benoît Mandelbrot)
- 27947 Emilemathieu (Émile Léonard Mathieu)
- 28516 Möbius (August Ferdinand Möbius)
- 29552 Chern (Shiing-Shen Chern)
- 38237 Roche (Édouard Roche)
- 50033 Perelman (Grigori Perelman)
- 59239 Alhazen (Abū ʿAlī al-Ḥasan ibn al-Ḥasan ibn al-Haytham, Arab Muslim scientist, mathematician, astronomer, and philosopher)

=== Physicists ===
- 697 Galilea (Galileo Galilei)
- 837 Schwarzschilda (Karl Schwarzschild)
- 1069 Planckia (Max Planck)
- 1565 Lemaitre (Georges Lemaître)
- 1979 Sakharov (Andrei Sakharov)
- 2001 Einstein (Albert Einstein)
- 2244 Tesla (Nikola Tesla)
- 2352 Kurchatov (Igor Kurchatov)
- 3069 Heyrovský (Jaroslav Heyrovský)
- 3581 Alvarez (Luis Alvarez)
- 3905 Doppler (Christian Doppler)
- 3948 Bohr (Niels Bohr)
- 3949 Mach (Ernst Mach)
- 4065 Meinel (Aden Meinel)
- 4530 Smoluchowski (Roman Smoluchowski)
- 5103 Diviš (Prokop Václav Diviš)
- 5224 Abbe (Ernst Abbe)
- 5668 Foucault (Léon Foucault)
- 6384 Kervin (Paul Kervin)
- 6999 Meitner (Lise Meitner)
- 7000 Curie (Maria Skłodowska-Curie)
- 7279 Hagfors (Tor Hagfors)
- 7495 Feynman (Richard Feynman)
- 7672 Hawking (Stephen Hawking)
- 8000 Isaac Newton (Isaac Newton)
- 8103 Fermi (Enrico Fermi)
- 9253 Oberth (Hermann Oberth)
- 10506 Rydberg (Johannes Rydberg)
- 10979 Fristephenson (Professor F. Richard Stephenson)
- 11013 Kullander (Sven Kullander)
- 11063 Poynting (John Henry Poynting)
- 11150 Bragg (William Lawrence Bragg)
- 11349 Witten (Edward Witten)
- 11438 Zel'dovich (Yakov Borisovich Zel'dovich)
- 11451 Aarongolden (Aaron Golden, Irish astrophysicist)
- 11528 Mie (Gustav Mie)
- 11577 Einasto (Jaan Einasto)
- 11779 Zernike (Frits Zernike)
- 12301 Eötvös (Loránd Eötvös)
- 12320 Loschmidt (Johann Josef Loschmidt)
- 12423 Slotin (Louis Slotin)
- 12628 Acworthorr (Mary Acworth Orr, solar physicist)
- 12755 Balmer (Johann Jakob Balmer)
- 12759 Joule (James Prescott Joule)
- 12760 Maxwell (James Clerk Maxwell)
- 12766 Paschen (Friedrich Paschen)
- 12773 Lyman (Theodore Lyman)
- 12774 Pfund (August Herman Pfund)
- 12775 Brackett (Frederick Sumner Brackett)
- 13092 Schrödinger (Erwin Schrödinger)
- 13093 Wolfgangpauli (Wolfgang Pauli)
- 13149 Heisenberg (Werner Heisenberg)
- 13219 Cailletet (Louis Paul Cailletet)
- 13478 Fraunhofer (Joseph von Fraunhofer)
- 13531 Weizsäcker (Carl Friedrich von Weizsäcker)
- 13954 Born (Max Born)
- 14413 Geiger (Hans Geiger)
- 14468 Ottostern (Otto Stern)
- 16583 Oersted (Hans Christian Ørsted)
- 16761 Hertz (Heinrich Hertz)
- 17649 Brunorossi (Bruno Rossi)
- 18169 Amaldi (Edoardo Amaldi)
- 19126 Ottohahn (Otto Hahn), father of nuclear fission
- 19178 Walterbothe (Walther Bothe)
- 20081 Occhialini (Giuseppe Occhialini)
- 24988 Alainmilsztajn (Alain Milsztajn, French particle physicist)
- 29137 Alanboss, (Alan Boss, American astrophysicist)
- 29212 Zeeman (Pieter Zeeman)
- 30828 Bethe (Hans Bethe)
- 32809 Sommerfeld (Arnold Sommerfeld)
- 37582 Faraday (Michael Faraday)
- 48798 Penghuanwu (Peng Huanwu)
- 52337 Compton (Arthur Compton)
- 55753 Raman (C. V. Raman)
- 58215 von Klitzing (Klaus von Klitzing)
- 67085 Oppenheimer (J. Robert Oppenheimer)
- 163244 Matthewhill (Matthew E. Hill)
- 176867 Brianlee (Brian C. Lee)
- 177770 Saulanwu (Sau Lan Wu)
- 202930 Ivezić (Željko Ivezić, Croatian-American astrophysicist)

=== Physiologists ===
- 1007 Pawlowia (Ivan Pavlov)
- 15262 Abderhalden (Emil Abderhalden)
- 117413 Ramonycajal (Santiago Ramón y Cajal)

=== Psychologists, psychiatrists, and psychoanalysts ===
- 635 Vundtia (Wilhelm Wundt)
- 4342 Freud (Sigmund Freud)
- 11040 Wundt (Wilhelm Wundt)
- 11041 Fechner (Gustav Fechner)
- 11299 Annafreud (Anna Freud)
- 11518 Jung (Carl Jung)
- 11519 Adler (Alfred Adler)
- 11520 Fromm (Erich Fromm)
- 11521 Erikson (Erik Homburger Erikson)
- 11582 Bleuler (Eugen Bleuler)
- 11584 Ferenczi (Sándor Ferenczi)

=== Space exploration ===
- Astrobiologists
  - 2410 Morrison (David Morrison)
  - 9826 Ehrenfreund (Pascale Ehrenfreund)
  - 12859 Marlamoore (Marla Moore)
  - 27347 Dworkin (Jason Dworkin)
- Planetary scientists
  - 2710 Veverka (Joseph Veverka)
  - 4815 Anders (Edward Anders)
  - 7231 Porco (Carolyn Porco)
  - 8356 Wadhwa (Meenakshi Wadhwa, meteorite analyst)
  - 13358 Revelle (Douglas ReVelle)
  - 21774 O'Brien (David P. O'Brien)
  - 45690 Janiradebaugh (Jani Radebaugh)
  - 133432 Sarahnoble (Sarah K. Noble)
  - 274860 Emilylakdawalla (Emily Lakdawalla)
- Rocket scientists
  - 1590 Tsiolkovskaja (Konstantin Tsiolkovsky)
  - 1855 Korolev (Sergei Korolev)
  - 8062 Okhotsymskij (Dmitry Okhotsimsky)
  - 9252 Goddard (Robert Goddard)
  - 25143 Itokawa (Hideo Itokawa)
- Soyuz 11 crew members:
  - 1789 Dobrovolsky (Georgi Dobrovolski)
  - 1790 Volkov (Vladislav Volkov)
  - 1791 Patsayev (Viktor Patsayev)
- Other USSR/Russian cosmonauts
  - 1772 Gagarin (Yuri Gagarin, the first human in space)
  - 1836 Komarov (Vladimir Komarov)
- Apollo 11 crew members:
  - 6469 Armstrong (Neil Armstrong)
  - 6470 Aldrin ("Buzz" Aldrin)
  - 6471 Collins (Michael Collins)
- STS-51-L crew members:
  - 3350 Scobee (Francis "Dick" Scobee)
  - 3351 Smith (Michael J. Smith)
  - 3352 McAuliffe (Christa McAuliffe)
  - 3353 Jarvis (Gregory Jarvis)
  - 3354 McNair (Ronald McNair)
  - 3355 Onizuka (Ellison Onizuka)
  - 3356 Resnik (Judith Resnik)
- STS-107 crew members:
  - 51823 Rickhusband (Rick Husband)
  - 51824 Mikeanderson (Michael P. Anderson)
  - 51825 Davidbrown (David M. Brown)
  - 51826 Kalpanachawla (Kalpana Chawla)
  - 51827 Laurelclark (Laurel B. Clark)
  - 51828 Ilanramon (Ilan Ramon, first Israeli astronaut)
  - 51829 Williemccool (William C. McCool)
- Other American astronauts:
  - 4763 Ride (Sally Ride)
  - 7749 Jackschmitt (Harrison H. Schmitt)
  - 12790 Cernan (Eugene Cernan)
  - 13606 Bean (Alan Bean)
  - 22442 Blaha (John E. Blaha)
- Chinese astronauts:
  - 9512 Feijunlong (Fei Junlong)
  - 9517 Niehaisheng (Nie Haisheng)
  - 21064 Yangliwei (Yang Liwei)
- Other astronauts:
  - 2552 Remek (Vladimír Remek, Czechoslovak cosmonaut)
  - 9496 Ockels (Wubbo Ockels, Dutch astronaut)
  - 14143 Hadfield (Chris Hadfield, Canadian astronaut)
  - 15006 Samcristoforetti (Samantha Cristoforetti, Italian astronaut)
  - 22901 Ivanbella (Ivan Bella, Slovak cosmonaut)
  - 37627 Lucaparmitano (Luca Parmitano, Italian astronaut)
  - 135268 Haigneré (Claudie and Jean-Pierre Haigneré, French astronauts)
  - 374354 Pesquet (Thomas Pesquet, French astronaut)

=== Other scientists, engineers and inventors ===
- 335 Roberta (Carl Robert Osten-Sacken, entomologist)
- 742 Edisona (Thomas Edison, inventor)
- 775 Lumière (Auguste and Louis Lumière, cinematic pioneers)
- 777 Gutemberga (Johannes Gutenberg, pioneer printer)
- 2177 Oliver (Bernard M. Oliver, research scientist)
- 2243 Lönnrot (Elias Lönnrot, physician, philologist, botanist, compiler of Kalevala)
- 2784 Domeyko (Ignacy Domeyko, mineralogist)
- 2809 Vernadskij (Vladimir Vernadsky, mineralogist, pioneer geochemist)
- 3256 Daguerre (Louis Daguerre, photographic pioneer)
- 3313 Mendel (Gregor Mendel, father of genetics)
- 3701 Purkyně (Jan Evangelista Purkyně, physiologist)
- 4082 Swann (Gordon Swann, lunar geologist)
- 4217 Engelhardt (Wolf von Engelhardt, geologist)
- 4565 Grossman (Lawrence Grossman, geochemist)
- 5102 Benfranklin (Benjamin Franklin, scientist)
- 5864 Montgolfier (Montgolfier brothers, hot air balloon pioneers)
- 5958 Barrande (Joachim Barrande, geologist and paleontologist)
- 6175 Cori (Carl Ferdinand Cori and Gerty Theresa Cori, biochemists)
- 7552 Sephton (Mark Sephton, geochemist)
- 8373 Stephengould (Stephen Jay Gould, evolutionist and essayist)
- 9969 Braille (Louis Braille, inventor of braille)
- 10093 Diesel (Rudolf Diesel, inventor of the diesel engine)
- 13609 Lewicki (Chris Lewicki), spacecraft systems engineer
- 14345 Gritsevich (Maria Gritsevich, research scientist)
- 15465 Buchroeder (Richard A. Buchroeder, optical engineer)
- 16518 Akihikoito (Akihiko Ito, Japanese CCD astrophotographer)
- 20259 Alanhoffman (Alan Hoffman, pioneer in infrared detectors)
- 29227 Wegener (Alfred Wegener, geologist and meteorologist)
- 37683 Gustaveeiffel (Gustave Eiffel, a French civil engineer and architect)
- 44103 Aldana (Fernando Aldana Mayor, electrical engineer, professor and politician)
- 61404 Očenášek (Ludvík Očenášek, handyman who constructed a monoplane, a radial engine for airplanes, and two-stage rockets)
- 73079 Davidbaltimore (David Baltimore, Nobel Prize in Physiology or Medicine Laureate)
- 172850 Coppens (Yves Coppens, paleoanthropologist)

== Monarchs and royalty ==
- 12 Victoria (officially named after the Roman goddess of victory, but also honours Queen Victoria)
- 45 Eugenia (Empress Eugénie), with its moon Petit-Prince in part for her son Napoléon Eugène, Prince Imperial
- 115 Thyra (Thyra, consort of King Gorm the Old of Denmark)
- 216 Kleopatra (Cleopatra VII of Egypt)
- 220 Stephania (Princess Stéphanie of Belgium)
- 295 Theresia (Maria Theresa Walburga Amalia Christina Empress consort of the Holy Roman Empire and Queen consort of Germany)
- 326 Tamara (Queen Tamar of Georgia)
- 344 Desiderata (Queen Desideria of Sweden and Norway)
- 359 Georgia (King George II of Great Britain)
- 392 Wilhelmina (Queen Wilhelmina of the Netherlands)
- 525 Adelaide (Queen Adelaide, consort of William IV of the United Kingdom)
- 545 Messalina (Messalina, Roman empress)
- 546 Herodias (Herodias, wife of Herod II and mother of Salome)
- 562 Salome (Salome, daughter of Herod II and Herodias)
- 598 Octavia (Octavia the Younger, sister of Augustus)
- 650 Amalasuntha (Amalasuntha, queen of the Ostrogoths)
- 653 Berenike (Berenice II, Egyptian queen)
- 689 Zita (Empress Zita of Bourbon-Parma)
- 816 Juliana (Queen Juliana of the Netherlands)
- 823 Sisigambis (Sisygambis, mother of Darius III of Persia)
- 831 Stateira (Stateira, wife of Artaxerxes II of Persia)
- 832 Karin (Karin Månsdotter, wife of Eric XIV of Sweden)
- 888 Parysatis (Parysatis, wife of Darius II of Persia)
- 911 Agamemnon (Agamemnon)
- 1068 Nofretete (Nefertiti)
- 1128 Astrid (Astrid of Sweden)
- 2436 Hatshepsut (Pharaoh Hatshepsut)
- 3362 Khufu (Pharaoh Khufu)
- 4414 Sesostris (Greek version of Senusret, name of four pharaohs)
- 4415 Echnaton (Pharaoh Akhenaten; German spelling of his name)
- 4416 Ramses (Pharaoh Ramesses II)
- 4568 Menkaure (Pharaoh Menkaure)
- 4721 Atahualpa (Atahuallpa)
- 4846 Tuthmosis (Thutmose, name of four pharaohs)
- 4847 Amenhotep (Pharaoh Amenhotep IV)
- 4848 Tutenchamun (Pharaoh Tutankhamun)
- 4906 Seneferu (Pharaoh Sneferu)
- 5009 Sethos (Greek version of Seti, name of two pharaohs)
- 5010 Amenemhet (Amenemhet, name of four pharaohs)
- 5242 Kenreimonin (Empress Dowager Kenrei)
- 7117 Claudius (Emperor Claudius)
- 7207 Hammurabi (Hammurabi)
- 7208 Ashurbanipal (Ashurbanipal)
- 7209 Cyrus (Cyrus II of Persia)
- 7210 Darius (Darius I of Persia)
- 7211 Xerxes (Xerxes I of Persia)
- 7212 Artaxerxes (Artaxerxes II of Persia)
- 8740 Václav (Václav I, Duke of Bohemia)
- 10293 Pribina (Pribina, ruler of Nitrian Principality)
- 11014 Svätopluk (Svätopluk, ruler of Great Moravia)
- 16951 Carolus Quartus (Charles IV, Holy Roman Emperor and King of Bohemia)
- 18349 Dafydd (Dafydd ap Llywelyn, prince of Wales)
- 20969 Samo (Samo, ruler of Samo's Empire)
- 25340 Segoves (Segoves, Celtic duke)
- 44613 Rudolf (Rudolph II, Holy Roman Emperor, king of Bohemia and Hungary)
- 48844 Belloves (Belloves, Celtic duke)
- 53285 Mojmír (Mojmír I, ruler of Great Moravia)
- 151834 Mongkut (King Mongkut, or Rama IV, the king of Siam)
- 326290 Akhenaten (Akhenaten, a pharaoh of the 18th Dynasty of Egypt)

== Politicians and statespeople ==
- 712 Boliviana (Simón Bolívar)
- 852 Wladilena (Vladimir Lenin)
- 886 Washingtonia (George Washington)
- 932 Hooveria and 1363 Herberta (Herbert Hoover)
- 944 Hidalgo (Miguel Hidalgo)
- 1569 Evita (Eva Perón, former First Lady of Argentina)
- 1841 Masaryk (Tomáš Garrigue Masaryk, 1st Czechoslovak president)
- 2351 O'Higgins (Bernardo O'Higgins, Chilean independence leader)
- 3571 Milanštefánik (Milan Rastislav Štefánik)
- 4317 Garibaldi (Giuseppe Garibaldi)
- 4927 O'Connell (Daniel O'Connell)
- 5102 Benfranklin (Benjamin Franklin, U.S. Ambassador to France)
- 7586 Bismarck (Otto von Bismarck)
- 9275 Persson (Jöran Persson)
- 11830 Jessenius (Jan Jessenius)
- 23238 Ocasio-Cortez (Alexandria Ocasio-Cortez) *Note: named prior to election to U.S. House of Representatives
- 188693 Roosevelt (Theodore Roosevelt)

== Teachers ==
=== High school/technical school teachers ===
- 3352 McAuliffe (Christa McAuliffe, high school teacher from New Hampshire, U.S.)
- 12787 Abetadashi (Tadashi Abe, high school teacher from Japan)
- 13241 Biyo (Josette Biyo, high school teacher from Iloilo, Philippines)
- 13928 Aaronrogers (Aaron Rogers, mathematics teacher from London, U.K.)
- 14158 Alananderson (Alan Anderson, middle school teacher from Florida, U.S.)
- 14684 Reyes (Cynthia L. Reyes, middle school teacher from Florida, U.S.)
- 16265 Lemay (Ron LeMay, high school teacher from Wisconsin, U.S.)
- 17225 Alanschorn (Alan Schorn, high school teacher from New York, U.S.)
- 20341 Alanstack (Alan Stack, high school teacher from New York, U.S.)
- 20342 Trinh (Jonathan Trinh, high school teacher from Texas, U.S.)
- 20574 Ochinero (Marcia Collin Ochinero, middle school teacher from Florida, U.S.)
- 21395 Albertofilho (Alberto Filho, a technical school teacher from Rio Grande Do Sul, Brasil)
- 21435 Aharon (Terri Aharon, high school teacher from New York, U.S.)
- 22619 Ajscheetz (A. J. Scheetz, high school teacher from Connecticut, U.S.)
- 22993 Aferrari (Andrew Ferrari, high school teacher from North Carolina, U.S.)
- 23017 Advincula (Rigoberto Advincula, high school teacher from Texas, U.S.)
- 23975 Akran (Erkan Akran, middle school teacher from Arkansas, U.S.)
- 24032 Aimeemcarthy (Aimee McCarthy, middle school teacher from Florida, U.S.)
- 24052 Nguyen (Thuy-Anh Nguyen, teacher at Challenger School in Sunnyvale, California, U.S.)
- 24238 Adkerson (Timothy Adkerson, high school teacher from Missouri, U.S.)
- 27286 Adedmondson (Adam Edmondson, high school teacher from Pennsylvania, U.S.)
- 27740 Obatomoyuki (Tomoyuki Oba, junior high school teacher and presenter at Geisei Observatory, Japan)
- 27748 Lee (Thomas Lee, middle school teacher from California, U.S.A)
- 268242 Pebble (Pebble Johnson, middle school teacher from Georgia, U.S.A)

=== College/University professors ===
- 6669 Obi (Shinya Obi, professor emeritus at the University of Tokyo and retired president of the University of the Air)
- 10051 Albee (Arden L. Albee, professor of geology and planetary sciences and dean of graduate studies at the California Institute of Technology)
- 15870 Oburka (Oto Oburka, professor at Brno University of Technology and founder of the Nicholas Copernicus Observatory)
- 153298 Paulmyers (PZ Myers, American scientist and associate professor of biology at the University of Minnesota Morris)

== War heroes and veterans ==
=== World War II heroes and veterans ===
- 1793 Zoya (Zoya Kosmodemyanskaya)
- 1907 Rudneva (Evgeniya Rudneva)
- 2009 Voloshina (Vera Danilovna Voloshina, Russian partisan)
- 2132 Zhukov (Georgy Zhukov)
- 3348 Pokryshkin (Aleksandr Ivanovich Pokryshkin)
- 11572 Schindler (Oskar Schindler, rescuer of 1,200 Jewish people)
- 17038 Wake (Nancy Wake, who served as a British spy)
- 19384 Winton (Nicholas Winton, rescuer of 669 Jewish children)
- 99949 Miepgies (Miep Gies, hid Anne Frank during World War II and discovered and preserved Anne's diary after her arrest and deportation.

=== Other war heroes ===
- 1834 Palach (Jan Palach, Czech student who self-immolated in protest against Soviet occupation of his country)
- 20164 Janzajíc (Jan Zajíc, Czech student who self-immolated in protest against Soviet occupation of his country)

=== Children who died in war ===
- 2127 Tanya (Tanya Savicheva)
- 5535 Annefrank (Anne Frank)
- 7616 Sadako (Sadako Sasaki, Japanese girl died from leukemia caused by atomic bomb dropped in Hiroshima.
- 50413 Petrginz (Petr Ginz, Jewish boy who was murdered in Auschwitz concentration camp)

== Religious figures ==
- 89 Julia (Julia of Corsica, martyr and patron saint, 5th century)
- 127 Johanna (believed to be named after Joan of Arc)
- 330 Adalberta (Adalbert Merx, German theologian and orientalist)
- 898 Hildegard (Hildegard of Bingen, abbess, composer and polymath)
- 1840 Hus (John Huss, Czech Jan Hus, religious reformer)
- 5275 Zdislava (Zdislava Berka, in Czech Zdislava z Lemberka)
- 7100 Martin Luther (Martin Luther)
- 7256 Bonhoeffer (Dietrich Bonhoeffer)
- 8661 Ratzinger (Joseph Alois Ratzinger – Pope Benedict XVI)
- 20006 Albertus Magnus (Albertus Magnus, German theologian, philosopher and naturalist)
- 326290 Akhenaten (Akhenaten, ancient Egyptian religious reformer)
- 858334 Gioacchinopecci (Gioacchino Vincenzo Raffaele Luigi Pecci - Pope Leo XIII)

== Explorers ==
- 54 Alexandra (Alexander von Humboldt, naturalist and explorer)
- 327 Columbia (Christopher Columbus)
- 853 Nansenia (Fridtjof Nansen, polar explorer)
- 876 Scott (Robert Falcon Scott, polar explorer)
- 1065 Amundsenia (Roald Amundsen, polar explorer)
- 2473 Heyerdahl (Thor Heyerdahl, explorer and writer)
- 2785 Sedov (Georgy Sedov, Arctic explorer)
- 3130 Hillary (Edmund Hillary, mountaineer [see Tenzing, below])
- 3357 Tolstikov (Yevgeny Tolstikov, polar explorer)
- 4055 Magellan (Ferdinand Magellan, circumnavigator)
- 6481 Tenzing (Tenzing Norgay, Sherpa [see Hillary, above])
- 6542 Jacquescousteau (Jacques-Yves Cousteau, marine explorer)
- 8291 Bingham (Hiram Bingham III, explorer)
- 15425 Welzl (Jan Welzl, Arctic explorer)
- 43806 Augustepiccard (Auguste Piccard, explorer)
- 472054 Tupaia (Tupaia, Tahitian Polynesian navigator)

== Social scientists ==
=== Historians ===
- 879 Ricarda (Ricarda Huch)
- 3092 Herodotus (Herodotus)
- 3097 Tacitus (Tacitus)
- 5946 Hrozný (Bedřich Hrozný, archaeologist, orientalist, and linguist)
- 6174 Polybius (Polybius)
- 6304 Josephus Flavius (Josephus)
- 16413 Abulghazi (Abulghazi Bahadur)
- 40444 Palacký (František Pálacký)

=== Linguists ===
- 1462 Zamenhof (L. L. Zamenhof, father of Esperanto)
- 13916 Bernolák (Anton Bernolák, linguist)
- 40440 Dobrovský (Josef Dobrovský, linguist)
- 52270 Noamchomsky (Noam Chomsky, American linguist, philosopher, cognitive scientist, historian, social critic, and political activist)

=== Other ===
- 1861 Komenský (Jan Amos Komenský (Comenius), teacher of nations)
- 12838 Adamsmith (Adam Smith, economist and social philosopher)

== Philosophers ==
- 238 Hypatia (Hypatia of Alexandria)
- 423 Diotima (Diotima of Mantinea)
- 2431 Skovoroda (Hryhorii Skovoroda)
- 2755 Avicenna (Avicenna)
- 2807 Karl Marx (Karl Marx)
- 2940 Bacon (Francis Bacon)
- 2950 Rousseau (Jean-Jacques Rousseau)
- 5102 Benfranklin (Benjamin Franklin)
- 5148 Giordano (Giordano Bruno)
- 5329 Decaro (Mario De Caro)
- 5450 Sokrates (Socrates)
- 5451 Plato (Plato)
- 6001 Thales (Thales)
- 6123 Aristoteles (Aristotle)
- 6629 Kurtz (Paul Kurtz)
- 7009 Hume (David Hume)
- 7010 Locke (John Locke)
- 7012 Hobbes (Thomas Hobbes)
- 7014 Nietzsche (Friedrich Nietzsche)
- 7015 Schopenhauer (Arthur Schopenhauer)
- 7056 Kierkegaard (Søren Kierkegaard)
- 7083 Kant (Immanuel Kant)
- 7142 Spinoza (Baruch Spinoza)
- 7853 Confucius (Confucius)
- 7854 Laotse (Laozi)
- 8318 Averroes (Averroes or Ibn Rushd)
- 14845 Hegel (Georg Wilhelm Friedrich Hegel)
- 15911 Davidgauthier (David Gauthier)
- 16561 Rawls (John Rawls)
- 19730 Machiavelli (Niccolò Machiavelli)
- 21665 Frege (Gottlob Frege)
- 22356 Feyerabend (Paul Feyerabend)
- 48435 Jaspers (Karl Jaspers)
- 73687 Thomas Aquinas (Thomas Aquinas)
- 90481 Wollstonecraft (Mary Wollstonecraft)
- 100027 Hannaharendt (Hannah Arendt)

== The arts ==
=== Literature ===
==== General authors ====
- 254 Augusta (Auguste von Littrow)
- 1931 Čapek (Karel Čapek)
- 2428 Kamenyar (Ivan Franko)
- 2616 Lesya (Lesya Ukrainka)
- 2681 Ostrovskij (Nikolai Ostrovsky)
- 3047 Goethe (Johann Wolfgang von Goethe)
- 3412 Kafka (Franz Kafka)
- 4112 Hrabal (Bohumil Hrabal)
- 5418 Joyce (James Joyce)
- 5535 Annefrank (Anne Frank)
- 5666 Rabelais (François Rabelais)
- 5676 Voltaire (Voltaire)
- 6984 Lewiscarroll (Lewis Carroll or Charles Dodgson)
- 7328 Casanova (Giacomo Casanova)
- 8315 Bajin (Ba Jin)
- 8379 Straczynski (J. Michael Straczynski)
- 8382 Mann (brothers Heinrich Mann and Thomas Mann)
- 13406 Sekora (Ondřej Sekora)
- 26314 Škvorecký (Josef Škvorecký)
- 40106 Erben (Karel Jaromír Erben)
- 44597 Thoreau (Henry David Thoreau)
- 79144 Cervantes (Miguel de Cervantes)
- 91007 Ianfleming (Ian Lancaster Fleming, creator of James Bond)
- 308306 Dainere (Dainere Anthoney)

==== Novelists ====
- 348 May (Karl May)
- 2362 Mark Twain (Mark Twain)
- 2448 Sholokhov (Mikhail Sholokhov)
- 2578 Saint-Exupéry (Antoine de Saint-Exupéry)
- 2625 Jack London (Jack London)
- 2675 Tolkien (J.R.R. Tolkien)
- 2817 Perec (Georges Perec)
- 3204 Lindgren (Astrid Lindgren)
- 3453 Dostoevsky (Fyodor Dostoevsky)
- 3479 Malaparte (Curzio Malaparte)
- 3628 Božněmcová (Božena Němcová)
- 3836 Lem (Stanisław Lem)
- 4124 Herriot (James Herriot)
- 4266 Waltari (Mika Waltari)
- 4370 Dickens (Charles Dickens)
- 4474 Proust (Marcel Proust)
- 4923 Clarke (Arthur C. Clarke)
- 5020 Asimov (Isaac Asimov)
- 5099 Iainbanks (Iain Banks)
- 6223 Dahl (Roald Dahl)
- 6440 Ransome (Arthur Ransome)
- 7016 Conandoyle (Arthur Conan Doyle)
- 7232 Nabokov (Vladimir Nabokov)
- 7390 Kundera (Milan Kundera)
- 7644 Cslewis (C. S. Lewis)
- 7758 Poulanderson (Poul Anderson)
- 9766 Bradbury (Ray Bradbury)
- 10177 Ellison (Harlan Ellison)
- 10251 Mulisch (Harry Mulisch)
- 10733 Georgesand (George Sand)
- 10930 Jinyong (Jinyong)
- 11020 Orwell (George Orwell)
- 11379 Flaubert (Gustave Flaubert)
- 12284 Pohl (Frederik Pohl)
- 17776 Troska (J. M. Troska)
- 25399 Vonnegut (Kurt Vonnegut)
- 25924 Douglasadams (Douglas Adams)
- 39415 Janeausten (Jane Austen)
- 39427 Charlottebrontë (Charlotte Brontë)
- 39428 Emilybrontë (Emily Brontë)
- 39429 Annebrontë (Anne Brontë)
- 77185 Cherryh (C. J. Cherryh)
- 127005 Pratchett (Terry Pratchett)
- 227641 Nothomb (Amélie Nothomb)

==== Poets ====
- 1875 Neruda (Jan Neruda)
- 2106 Hugo (Victor Hugo)
- 2208 Pushkin (Aleksandr Pushkin)
- 2222 Lermontov (Mikhail Lermontov)
- 2427 Kobzar (Taras Shevchenko)
- 2604 Marshak (Samuil Marshak)
- 3067 Akhmatova (Anna Akhmatova)
- 3112 Velimir (Velimir Khlebnikov)
- 4110 Keats (John Keats)
- 4369 Seifert (Jaroslav Seifert)
- 4635 Rimbaud (Arthur Rimbaud)
- 7855 Tagore (Rabindranath Tagore)
- 9495 Eminescu (Mihai Eminescu)
- 11306 Åkesson (Sonja Åkesson)
- 12163 Manilius (Marcus Manilius)
- 18624 Prévert (Jacques Prévert)
- 59830 Reynek (Bohuslav Reynek)
- 110288 Libai (Li Bai)
- 110289 Dufu (Du Fu)
- 434325 Lautréamont (Isidore Lucien Ducasse)

==== Playwrights ====
- 496 Gryphia (Andreas Gryphius)
- 615 Roswitha (Hrotsvitha)
- 2930 Euripides (Euripides)
- 2985 Shakespeare (William Shakespeare)
- 2921 Sophocles (Sophocles)
- 2934 Aristophanes (Aristophanes)
- 3046 Molière (Molière, French playwright)
- 3079 Schiller (Friedrich Schiller, German playwright)
- 5696 Ibsen (Henrik Ibsen)

==== Satirists ====
- 2734 Hašek (Jaroslav Hašek)
- 3244 Petronius (Petronius)
- 3668 Ilfpetrov (Ilya Ilf and Evgeny Petrov)
- 15017 Cuppy (Will Cuppy)
- 15946 Satinský (Július Satinský)

==== Other ====
- 4049 Noragalʹ (Nora Galʹ, Russian translator)
- 12608 Aesop (Aesop, fabulist)

=== Visual arts ===
- 2730 Barks (Carl Barks, cartoonist)
- 3001 Michelangelo (Michelangelo Buonarroti, painter and sculptor)
- 3246 Bidstrup (Herluf Bidstrup, caricaturist)
- 3566 Levitan (Isaac Levitan, painter)
- 4426 Roerich (Nicholas Roerich, painter)
- 4457 van Gogh (Vincent van Gogh, painter)
- 4511 Rembrandt (Rembrandt van Rijn, painter)
- 4671 Drtikol (František Drtikol, photographer)
- 4691 Toyen (Toyen, painter and graphic artist)
- 4942 Munroe (Randall Munroe, former NASA roboticist and cartoonist, creator of webcomic xkcd)
- 5055 Opekushin (Alexander Opekushin, sculptor)
- 5122 Mucha (Alfons Mucha, painter and graphic artist)
- 5363 Kupka (František Kupka, painter and graphic artist)
- 5800 Pollock (Jackson Pollock, painter)
- 6056 Donatello (Donatello, painter)
- 6584 Ludekpesek (Ludek Pesek, painter)
- 6592 Goya (Francisco Goya, painter)
- 6674 Cézanne (Paul Cézanne, painter)
- 6676 Monet (Claude Monet, painter)
- 6677 Renoir (Pierre-Auguste Renoir, painter)
- 6701 Warhol (Andy Warhol, artist)
- 6768 Mathiasbraun (Mathias Braun, also known as Matyáš Braun, sculptor and carver)
- 6769 Brokoff (Johann Brokoff, also known as Jan Brokoff, sculptor and carver)
- 7701 Zrzavý (Jan Zrzavý, painter)
- 7867 Burian (Zdeněk Burian, painter and book illustrator)
- 8236 Gainsborough (Thomas Gainsborough, landscape and portrait artist)
- 8237 Constable (John Constable, painter)
- 8240 Matisse (Henri Matisse, painter)
- 10189 Normanrockwell (Norman Rockwell, artist)
- 10218 Bierstadt (Albert Bierstadt, Landscape artist)
- 10343 Church (Frederick Edwin Church, painter)
- 10372 Moran (Thomas Moran, landscape artist)
- 10404 McCall (Robert T. McCall, space artist)
- 13227 Poor (Kim Poor, space artist)
- 13329 Davidhardy (David A. Hardy, space artist)
- 13330 Dondavis (Don Davis, astronomical artist)
- 13543 Butler (Chris Butler, space artist)
- 13562 Bobeggleton (Bob Eggleton, painter)
- 14976 Josefčapek (Josef Čapek, painter and writer)
- 17625 Joseflada (Josef Lada, painter)
- 17806 Adolfborn (Adolf Born, painter)
- 20364 Zdeněkmiler (Zdeněk Miler, animator and illustrator)
- 21501 Acevedo (Tony Acevedo, multimedia graphic designer)
- 29490 Myslbek (Josef Václav Myslbek, sculptor)
- 43724 Pechstein (Max Pechstein, painter)
- 43775 Tiepolo (Giovanni Battista Tiepolo, painter)
- 46280 Hollar (Václav Hollar, graphic artist and painter)
- 48434 Maxbeckmann (Max Beckmann, painter)
- 85411 Paulflora (Paul Flora, graphic artist)
- 98127 Vilgusová (Hedvika Vilgusová, painter and illustrator of books for children)
- 184878 Gotlib (Marcel Gottlieb, cartoonist)

=== Architects ===
- 3062 Wren (Christopher Wren)
- 5318 Dientzenhofer (Dientzenhofer family or architects, like Christoph Dientzenhofer and his son Kilian Ignaz Dientzenhofer)
- 6055 Brunelleschi (Filippo Brunelleschi)
- 6266 Letzel (Jan Letzel)
- 6550 Parléř (Peter Parler, Czech: Petr Parléř)
- 19129 Loos (Adolf Loos)
- 24666 Miesvanrohe (Ludwig Mies van der Rohe)
- 35233 Krčín (Jakub Krčín)

=== Classical music ===
==== Composers ====
- 734 Benda (Karel Bendl)
- 1034 Mozartia (Wolfgang Amadeus Mozart)
- 1059 Mussorgskia (Modest Mussorgsky)
- 1405 Sibelius (Jean Sibelius)
- 1814 Bach (member of Bach family, probably Johann Sebastian Bach)
- 1815 Beethoven (Ludwig van Beethoven)
- 1818 Brahms (Johannes Brahms)
- 2047 Smetana (Bedřich Smetana)
- 2055 Dvořák (Antonín Dvořák)
- 2073 Janáček (Leoš Janáček)
- 2205 Glinka (Mikhail Glinka)
- 2266 Tchaikovsky (Pyotr Ilyich Tchaikovsky)
- 2420 Čiurlionis (Mikalojus Konstantinas Čiurlionis)
- 2523 Ryba (Jakub Jan Ryba)
- 2669 Shostakovich (Dmitri Shostakovich)
- 3081 Martinůboh (Bohuslav Martinů)
- 3590 Holst (Gustav Holst)
- 3592 Nedbal (Oskar Nedbal)
- 3784 Chopin (Frédéric Chopin)
- 3826 Handel (George Frideric Handel)
- 3917 Franz Schubert (Franz Schubert)
- 3941 Haydn (Joseph Haydn)
- 3954 Mendelssohn (Felix Mendelssohn)
- 3955 Bruckner (Anton Bruckner)
- 3975 Verdi (Giuseppe Verdi)
- 3992 Wagner (Richard Wagner)
- 4003 Schumann (probably Robert Schumann)
- 4040 Purcell (Henry Purcell)
- 4079 Britten (Benjamin Britten)
- 4132 Bartók (Béla Bartók)
- 4134 Schütz (Heinrich Schütz)
- 4330 Vivaldi (Antonio Vivaldi)
- 4345 Rachmaninoff (Sergei Rachmaninoff)
- 4382 Stravinsky (Igor Stravinsky)
- 4406 Mahler (Gustav Mahler)
- 4492 Debussy (Claude Debussy)
- 4515 Khrennikov (Tikhon Khrennikov)
- 4527 Schoenberg (Arnold Schoenberg)
- 4528 Berg (Alban Berg)
- 4529 Webern (Anton Webern)
- 4532 Copland (Aaron Copland)
- 4534 Rimskij-Korsakov (Nikolai Rimsky-Korsakov)
- 4546 Franck (César Franck)
- 4559 Strauss (Johann Strauss family or Richard Strauss)
- 4579 Puccini (Giacomo Puccini)
- 4625 Shchedrin (Rodion Shchedrin)
- 4727 Ravel (Maurice Ravel)
- 4734 Rameau (Jean-Philippe Rameau)
- 4802 Khatchaturian (Aram Khatchaturian)
- 4818 Elgar (Edward Elgar)
- 4850 Palestrina (Giovanni Pierluigi da Palestrina)
- 4972 Pachelbel (Johann Pachelbel)
- 5004 Bruch (Max Bruch)
- 5063 Monteverdi (Claudio Monteverdi)
- 5157 Hindemith (Paul Hindemith)
- 5177 Hugowolf (Hugo Wolf)
- 5210 Saint-Saëns (Camille Saint-Saëns)
- 6354 Vangelis (Vangelis Papathanassiou)
- 6480 Scarlatti (Alessandro and Domenico Scarlatti)
- 6549 Skryabin (Alexander Scriabin)
- 6777 Balakirev (Mily Balakirev)
- 6780 Borodin (Alexander Borodin)
- 6798 Couperin (François Couperin)
- 7622 Pergolesi (Giovanni Battista Pergolesi)
- 7624 Gluck (Christoph Willibald Gluck)
- 7625 Louisspohr (Louis Spohr)
- 7903 Albinoni (Tomaso Albinoni)
- 8181 Rossini (Gioacchino Rossini)
- 8249 Gershwin (George Gershwin)
- 8877 Rentaro (Taki Rentaro)
- 9438 Satie (Erik Satie)
- 9493 Enescu (George Enescu)
- 9912 Donizetti (Gaetano Donizetti)
- 9913 Humperdinck (Engelbert Humperdinck)
- 10055 Silcher (Friedrich Silcher)
- 10116 Robertfranz (Robert Franz)
- 10186 Albéniz (Isaac Albéniz, Spanish Catalan composer and pianist)
- 10820 Offenbach (Jacques Offenbach)
- 10875 Veracini (Francesco Maria Veracini)
- 11050 Messiaen (Olivier Messiaen)
- 11289 Frescobaldi (Girolamo Frescobaldi)
- 11530 d'Indy (Vincent d'Indy)
- 11899 Weill (Kurt Weill)
- 12782 Mauersberger (Brothers Rudolf and Erhard Mauersberger, composers and conductors)
- it:14403 de Machault (Guillaume de Machaut)
- 15808 Zelter (Carl Friedrich Zelter)
- 16590 Brunowalter (Bruno Walter, composer and conductor)
- 17509 Ikumadan (Ikuma Dan)
- 53159 Mysliveček (Josef Mysliveček)
- 69288 Berlioz (Hector Berlioz)
- 300128 Panditjasraj (Pandit Jasraj)

==== Conductors ====
- 5230 Asahina (Takashi Asahina)
- 6432 Temirkanov (Yuri Temirkanov)
- 11201 Talich (Václav Talich)
- 21801 Ančerl (Karel Ančerl)
- 21804 Václavneumann (Václav Neumann)
- 36226 Mackerras (Charles Mackerras)

==== Opera Singers ====
- 218 Bianca (Bertha Schwarz, stage name Bianca Bianchi)
- 5203 Pavarotti (Luciano Pavarotti)
- 6583 Destinn (Ema Destinnová, also known as Emmy Destinn)
- 18460 Pecková (Dagmar Pecková)
- 37573 Enricocaruso (Enrico Caruso)
- 260508 Alagna (Roberto Alagna)

==== Other ====
- 644 Cosima (Cosima Wagner, director of the Bayreuth Festival and wife of Richard Wagner)
- 677 Aaltje (Aaltje Noordewier-Reddingius, soprano)
- 5184 Cavaillé-Coll (Aristide Cavaillé-Coll, Organ builder)
- 8471 Obrant (Arkadij Efimovich Obrant, ballet-master, producer, and teacher-humanist)
- 9914 Obukhova (Nadezhda Andreevna Obukhova, soloist at the Bolshoj Theater and People's Artist of the U.S.S.R.)
- 11305 Ahlqvist (David Ahlqvist, Swedish artist, author, and musician)
- 58373 Albertoalonso (Alberto Alonso, Cuban choreographer and dance visionary)

== Entertainment ==
=== Popular music ===
- 1889 Pakhmutova (Aleksandra Pakhmutova, composer)
- 2620 Santana (Carlos Santana, musician)
- 2644 Victor Jara (Víctor Jara, musician)
- 3738 Ots (Georg Ots, musician)
- 3834 Zappafrank (Frank Zappa, musician)
- 8749 Beatles (The Beatles, band). In addition, there are four consecutively numbered minor planets named after the individual members of The Beatles:
  - 4147 Lennon (John Lennon)
  - 4148 McCartney (Paul McCartney)
  - 4149 Harrison (George Harrison)
  - 4150 Starr (Ringo Starr)
- 4305 Clapton (Eric Clapton, musician)
- 4422 Jarre (Maurice Jarre and Jean Michel Jarre, French composers)
- 4442 Garcia (Jerry Garcia, musician)
- 4738 Jimihendrix (Jimi Hendrix, musician)
- 4749 Ledzeppelin (Led Zeppelin, the UK band)
- 5656 Oldfield (Mike Oldfield, composer)
- 5892 Milesdavis (Miles Davis, musician)
- 5945 Roachapproach (Steve Roach, musician)
- 6354 Vangelis (Vangelis Papathanassiou, composer)
- 6433 Enya (Enya, musician)
- 7226 Kryl (Karel Kryl, musician)
- 7707 Yes (Yes, band)
- 7934 Sinatra (Frank Sinatra, vocalist)
- 8249 Gershwin (George Gershwin, composer)
- 9179 Satchmo (Louis Armstrong, musician)
- 10026 Sophiexeon (Sophie Xeon, a Scottish electronic producer)
- 10313 Vanessa-Mae (Vanessa-Mae, musician)
- 10731 Dollyparton (Dolly Parton, musician)
- 12272 Geddylee (Geddy Lee, Canadian musician)
- 13644 Lynnanderson (Lynn Anderson, an American country music singer)
- 14024 Procol Harum (Procol Harum, band)
- 15092 Beegees (Bee Gees, band)
- 16155 Buddy (Buddy Holly, musician)
- 17059 Elvis (Elvis Presley, musician)
- 17473 Freddiemercury (Freddie Mercury, musician)
- 18132 Spector (Phil Spector, musician)
- 18125 Brianwilson (Brian Wilson, musician)
- 19155 Lifeson (Alex Lifeson, Canadian musician)
- 19367 Pink Floyd (Pink Floyd, band)
- 19383 Rolling Stones (Rolling Stones, band)
- 19398 Creedence (Creedence Clearwater Revival, band)
- 21891 Andreabocelli (Andrea Bocelli, tenor singer)
- 22521 ZZ Top (ZZ Top, band)
- 23469 Neilpeart (Neil Peart, Canadian musician)
- 23990 Springsteen (Bruce Springsteen, musician)
- 24997 Petergabriel (Peter Gabriel, musician)
- 28151 Markknopfler (Mark Knopfler, a Scottish composer)
- 34760 Ciccone (Madonna (Madonna Louise Ciccone), musician)
- 40248 Yukikajiura (Yuki Kajiura, a Japanese composer)
- 40775 Kalafina (Kalafina, a Japanese vocal group). In addition, there are four minor planets named after the individual members and former member of Kalafina:
  - 41199 Wakanaootaki (Wakana Ootaki)
  - 42271 Keikokubota (Keiko Kubota)
  - 44475 Hikarumasai (Hikaru Masai)
  - 47466 Mayatoyoshima (Maya Toyoshima – former member)
- 41981 Yaobeina (Yao Beina, singer)
- 42522 Chuckberry (Chuck Berry, an American guitarist, singer and songwriter)
- 44016 Jimmypage (Jimmy Page, musician)
- 52344 Yehudimenuhin (Yehudi Menuhin, violist and conductor)
- 52665 Brianmay (Brian May, musician, member of the band Queen)
- 65769 Mahalia, (Mahalia Jackson, singer)
- 72801 Manzanera, (Phil Manzanera, musician)
- 72802 Wetton, (John Wetton, musician)
- 79896 Billhaley (Bill Haley, musician)
- 81947 Fripp (Robert Fripp, musician, leader of the band King Crimson)
- 81948 Eno (Brian Eno, musician)
- 90125 Chrissquire (Chris Squire, musician, member of the band Yes)
- 91287 Simon-Garfunkel (Simon and Garfunkel, band)
- 94291 Django (Django Reinhardt, musician)
- 110393 Rammstein (Rammstein, band)
- 144296 Steviewonder (Stevie Wonder, a blind American songwriter and singer)
- 242516 Lindseystirling (Lindsey Stirling, an American violinist)
- 243002 Lemmy (Ian "Lemmy" Kilmister, British rock musician, member of Hawkwind, The Head Cat, and Motörhead)
- 249516 Aretha (Aretha Franklin, musician)
- 250840 Motörhead (The British heavy metal group Motörhead)
- 257248 Chouchiehlun (Chou Chieh Lun, mostly referred to as Jay Chou, a Taiwanese musician and singer-songwriter)
- 274213 Satriani (Joe Satriani, guitarist)
- 292872 Anoushankar (Anoushka Shankar, a sitar musician)
- 327695 Yokoono (Yoko Ono, musician)
- 337044 Bobdylan (Bob Dylan, musician)
- 342843 Davidbowie (David Bowie, musician)
- 365443 Holiday (Billie Holiday, jazz musician)
- 495181 Rogerwaters (Roger Waters, musician, one of Pink Floyd founders)
- 495253 Hanszimmer (Hans Zimmer, a German composer)
- 601916 Sting (Sting (Gordon M. Sumner), an English musician, singer, songwriter and actor, who also co-founded the rock band "The Police")
- 861969 Elliottsmith (Elliott Smith, musician)

=== Film, TV and theatre ===
- 2374 Vladvysotskij, (Vladimir Vysotsky, singer, poet, writer, movie and theatre actor)
- 2816 Pien, (Armand Pien, Belgian TV weatherman)
- 3252 Johnny (Johnny Carson, Talk Show Host)
- 3768 Monroe (Marilyn Monroe, an American actress, model, and singer)
- 3998 Tezuka (Osamu Tezuka, pioneering Japanese comic artist and animator)
- 4238 Audrey (Audrey Hepburn, actress)
- 4495 Dassanowsky (Elfi Dassanowsky, Austrian-born singer, studio founder, producer)
- 4535 Adamcarolla (Adam Carolla, comedian, television and radio host)
- 4536 Drewpinsky (Drew Pinsky, television and radio host, actor)
- 4659 Roddenberry (Gene Roddenberry, Star Trek creator)
- 4864 Nimoy (Leonard Nimoy, of Star Trek fame)
- 4901 Ó Briain (Dara Ó Briain, comedian and science presenter)
- 5608 Olmos (Edward James Olmos, actor)
- 6318 Cronkite (Walter Cronkite, TV newsreader)
- 6377 Cagney (James Cagney, actor)
- 6546 Kaye (Danny Kaye, actor and comedian)
- 7032 Hitchcock (Alfred Hitchcock, film director)
- 7037 Davidlean (David Lean, film director)
- 7307 Takei (George Takei, actor)
- 8299 Téaleoni (Téa Leoni, actress)
- 8347 Lallaward (Lalla Ward, actress)
- 8353 Megryan (Meg Ryan, actress)
- 8664 Grigorijrichters (Grigorij Richters, film director and co-founder of Asteroid Day)
- 8883 Miyazakihayao (Hayao Miyazaki, animator)
- 9081 Hideakianno (Hideaki Anno, Japanese animator, film director and actor)
- 9341 Gracekelly (Grace Kelly, actress)
- 9342 Carygrant (Cary Grant, actor)
- Monty Python members:
  - 9617 Grahamchapman (Graham Chapman)
  - 9618 Johncleese (John Cleese)
  - 9619 Terrygilliam (Terry Gilliam)
  - 9620 Ericidle (Eric Idle)
  - 9621 Michaelpalin (Michael Palin)
  - 9622 Terryjones (Terry Jones)
- 9974 Brody (Adrien Brody)
- 10221 Kubrick (Stanley Kubrick)
- 10378 Ingmarbergman (Ingmar Bergman, film director)
- 11333 Forman (Miloš Forman, film director)
- 11548 Jerrylewis (Jerry Lewis, comedian and actor)
- 12561 Howard (Ron Howard, actor, director, producer)
- 12562 Briangrazer (Brian Grazer, producer)
- 12818 Tomhanks (Tom Hanks, actor, producer)
- 12820 Robinwilliams (Robin Williams, actor, comedian)
- 13070 Seanconnery (Sean Connery, actor)
- 13441 Janmerlin (Jan Merlin, actor and author)
- 15131 Alanalda (Alan Alda, actor, director, screenwriter, author)
- 17023 Abbott (Bud Abbott, actor, producer, comedian)
- 17062 Bardot (Brigitte Bardot, a French former actress, singer and fashion model)
- 17744 Jodiefoster (Jodie Foster, actress)
- 19291 Karelzeman (Karel Zeman, film director)
- 19578 Kirkdouglas (Kirk Douglas, actor)
- 19695 Billnye (Bill Nye, TV science educator)
- 22903 Georgeclooney (George Clooney, actor)
- 25930 Spielberg (Steven Spielberg, American film director)
- 26733 Nanavisitor (Nana Visitor, actress)
- 26734 Terryfarrell (Terry Farrell, actress)
- 26858 Misterrogers (Fred Rogers, US children's television host)
- 27899 Letterman (David Letterman, talk show host)
- 28600 Georgelucas (George Lucas, American film director and creator of Star Wars)
- 28980 Chowyunfat (Chow Yun-fat, actor)
- 29132 Bradpitt (Brad Pitt, actor)
- 31556 Shatner (William Shatner, actor)
- 38461 Jiřítrnka (Jiří Trnka, puppet maker and puppet-film director)
- 39557 Gielgud (John Gielgud, actor)
- 64291 Anglee (Ang Lee, film director)
- 68410 Nichols (Nichelle Nichols, actress)
- 71000 Hughdowns (Hugh Downs, Television and radio anchorman)
- 78453 Bullock (Sandra Bullock, an American actress and producer)
- 110026 Hamill (Mark Hamill, actor)
- 116939 Jonstewart (Jon Stewart, comedian and TV host)
- 132874 Latinovits (Zoltán Latinovits, actor)
- 132904 Notkin (Geoffrey Notkin, TV science educator, film producer)
- 133161 Ruttkai (Éva Ruttkai, actress)
- 166614 Zsazsa (Zsa Zsa Gábor, actress and socialite)
- 224693 Morganfreeman (Morgan Freeman, actor)
- 231307 Peterfalk (Peter Falk, actor)
- 261690 Jodorowsky (Alejandro Jodorowsky, Chilean-French filmmaker)
- 262876 Davidlynch (David Lynch, American filmmaker)
- 217472 Addams (Charles Addams, American cartoonist)
- 332324 Bobmcdonald (Bob McDonald, Canadian science broadcaster and writer)
- 343662 Robmorgan (Rob Morgan), an American actor)
- 379470 Carolynjones (Carolyn Jones, American actress)
- 550525 Sigourneyweaver (Sigourney Weaver, an American actress)
- 560354 Chrisnolan (Christopher Nolan, film director)
- 636680 Lisaloring (Lisa Loring, American actress)
- 645530 Patrickstewart (Patrick Stewart, English actor)
- 666312 Aroneisenberg (Aron Eisenberg, actor)

=== Sports ===
==== Olympic medalists ====
- 1740 Nurmi (Paavo Nurmi, middle- and long-distance runner)
- 5910 Zátopek (Emil Zátopek, long-distance runner)
- 8217 Dominikhašek (Dominik Hašek, ice hockey player)
- 9224 Železný (Jan Železný, javelin thrower)
- 26986 Čáslavská (Věra Čáslavská, gymnast)
- 128036 Rafaelnadal (Rafael Nadal Parera, tennis player)
- 151659 Egerszegi (Krisztina Egerszegi, swimmer)
- 175281 Kolonics (György Kolonics, canoeist)
- 230975 Rogerfederer (Roger Federer, tennis player)

==== Other sports ====
- 1909 Alekhin (Alexander Alekhine, chess world champion)
- 4538 Vishyanand (Viswanathan Anand, chess world champion)
- 2472 Bradman (Donald Bradman, cricketer)
- 3027 Shavarsh (Shavarsh Karapetyan, finswimmer)
- 5891 Gehrig (Lou Gehrig, baseball player)
- 6758 Jesseowens (Jesse Owens, athlete)
- 7835 Myroncope (Myron Cope, sportscaster and journalist)
- 10634 Pepibican (Josef Bican, called "Pepi", football player)
- 10675 Kharlamov (Valeri Kharlamov, hockey player)
- 120097 Janniksinner (Jannik Sinner, tennis player)
- 12373 Lancearmstrong (Lance Armstrong, cyclist)
- 12413 Johnnyweir (Johnny Weir, figure skater)
- 12414 Bure (Pavel Bure, ice hockey player)
- 14282 Cruijff (Johan Cruijff, Dutch football player)
- 33179 Arsènewenger (Arsène Wenger, football manager)
- 78071 Vicent (Francesc Vicent, chess writer)
- 79647 Ballack (Michael Ballack, German footballer)
- 82656 Puskás (Ferenc Puskás, football player)
- 85386 Payton (Walter Payton, American football player)
- 90414 Karpov (Anatoly Karpov, chess world champion)
- 316020 Linshuhow (Jeremy Lin, basketball player)

=== Science YouTubers/communicators ===
- 13943 Hankgreen (Hank Green)
- 16648 Hossi (Sabine Hossenfelder)
- 21943 Diannacowern (Dianna Cowern)
- 22955 Tibees (Toby Hendy)
- 27234 Timdodd (Tim Dodd)
- 31426 Davidlouapre (David Louapre, French science communicator)
- 31453 Arnaudthiry (Arnaud Thiry, French science communicator)
- 33434 Scottmanley (Scott Manley, science communicator and gamer)
- 35419 Beckysmethurst (Rebecca Smethurst)
- 42795 Derekmuller (Derek Muller)
- 46925 Bradyharan (Brady Haran)
- 158092 Frasercain (Fraser Cain)
- 314159 Mattparker (Matt Parker)
- 628318 Stevemould (Steve Mould)
- 660931 Antonpetrov (Anton Petrov, Canadian teacher and science journalist)
- 813826 Vihart (Vi Hart, American mathematician and former YouTuber)

=== Other entertainers ===
- 3163 Randi (James Randi, magician and skeptic)

== Contest winners ==
=== Broadcom MASTERS ===
- 2015 winner
  - 31641 Cevasco (Hannah Olivia Cevasco, a middle school student from California, U.S.A)

=== Discovery Channel Young Scientist Challenge ===
- 2001 winners
  - 15155 Ahn (Ryan J. Ahn, a middle school student from Pennsylvania, U.S.)
  - 15559 Abigailhines (Abigail M. Hines, a middle school student from Indiana, U.S.)
- 2002 winners
  - 13434 Adamquade (Adam Robert Quade, a middle school student from Minnesota, U.S.)
- 2003 winners
  - 19564 Ajburnetti (Anthony James Burnetti, a middle school student from Maryland, U.S.)
- 2004 winners
  - 20503 Adamtazi (Adam Ryoma Tazi, a middle school student from Florida, U.S.)
- 2005 winners
  - 21850 Abshir (Iftin Mohamed Abshir, a middle school student from Colorado, U.S.)
  - 21933 Aaronrozon (Aaron Alexander Rozon, a middle school student from Hawaii, U.S.)
- 2006 winners
  - 22638 Abdulla (Almas Ugurgizi Abdulla, a middle school student from Florida, U.S.)
  - 22656 Aaronburrows (Aaron Phillip Burrows, a middle school student from Texas, U.S.)
  - 22786 Willipete (William Garrett Pete, a middle school student from Minnesota, U.S.)
- 2007 winners
  - 23768 Abu-Rmaileh (Muhammad Akef Abu-Rmaileh, a middle school student from Arkansas, U.S.)
  - 23924 Premt (Prem Thottumkara, a middle school student from Illinois, U.S.A)

=== Intel International Science and Engineering Fair ===
- 2002 winners
  - 10237 Adzic (Vladislav Adzic, high school student from New York, U.S.)
  - 11685 Adamcurry (Adam Michael Curry, high school student from Colorado, U.S.)
  - 11697 Estrella (Allan Noriel Estrella, high school student from Manila, Philippines)
  - 12088 Macalintal (Jeric Valles Macalintal, high school student from Manila, Philippines)
  - 12522 Rara (Prem Vilas Fortran Rara, high school student from Iligan, Philippines)
  - 12553 Aaronritter (Aaron M. Ritter, high school student from Indiana, U.S.)
  - 13241 Biyo (Josette Biyo, high school teacher from Iloilo, Philippines, former executive director of the Philippine Science High School System)
- 2003 winners
  - 16999 Ajstewart (Andrew James Stewart, high school student from NSW, Australia)
  - 17984 Ahantonioli (Alexandra Hope Antonioli, high school student from Montana, U.S.)
  - 18084 Adamwohl (Adam Richard Wohl, high school student from North Dakota, U.S.)
  - 18142 Adamsidman (Adam Daniel Sidman, high school student from Colorado, U.S.)
  - 18796 Acosta (Iyen Abdon Acosta, high school student from Maryland, U.S.)
  - 19444 Addicott (Charles Michael Addicott, high school student from Florida, U.S.)
  - 19488 Abramcoley (Abram Levi Coley, high school student from Montana, U.S.)
  - 21395 Albertofilho (Alberto Filho, a technical school teacher from Rio Grande Do Sul, Brasil)
- 2004 winners
  - 20779 Xiajunchao (Junchao Xia, high school student from Shanghai, China)
  - 20780 Chanyikhei (Chan Yik Hei, high school student from Hong Kong, China)
  - 20813 Aakashshah (Aakash Shah, high school student from New Jersey, U.S.)
- 2005 winners
  - 21483 Abdulrasool (Ameen Abdulrasool, high school student from Illinois, U.S.)
  - 21712 Obaid (Sami Obaid, college student from Quebec, Canada.)
  - 21758 Adrianveres (Adrian Veres, high school student from Quebec, Canada)
- 2006 winners
  - 21400 Ahdout (Zimra Payvand Ahdout, high school student from New York, U.S.)
  - 21623 Albertshieh (Albert David Shieh, high school student from Arizona, U.S.)
  - 21725 Zhongyuechen (Zhong Yuechen, Middle School student from Beijing, China)
- 2007 winners
  - 23113 Aaronhakim (Aaron Hakim, high school student from Ontario, Canada)
  - 23238 Ocasio-Cortez (Alexandria Ocasio-Cortez, high school student from New York, U.S.)
  - 23306 Adamfields (Adam Chaplin Fields, high school student from New York, U.S.)
- 2008 winners
  - 24520 Abramson (Ronit Batya Roth Abramson, high school student from California, U.S.)
  - 24346 Lehienphan (Le Hien Thi Phan, high school student from Georgia, U.S.)
- 2009 winners
  - 25638 Ahissar (Shira Ahissar, high school student from Rehovot, Israel.)
  - 25642 Adiseshan (Tara Anjali Adiseshan, high school student from Virginia, U.S.)
  - 25677 Aaronenten (Aaron Christopher Enten, high school student from Florida, U.S.)
- 2010 winners
  - 26386 Adelinacozma (Adelina Corina Cozma, high school student from Ontario, Canada)
  - 26447 Akrishnan (Akash Krishnan, high school student from Oregon, U.S.)
  - 26462 Albertcui (Albert Cui, high school student from Utah, U.S.)
  - 26544 Ajjarapu (Avanthi Sai Ajjarapu, high school student from Iowa, U.S.)
  - 26557 Aakritijain (Aakriti Jain, high school student from California, U.S.)
  - 26737 Adambradley (Adam Bradley Halverson, high school student from South Dakota, U.S.)
  - 26740 Camacho (Martin Ayalde Camacho, high school student from Minnesota, U.S.)
  - 28400 Morgansinko (Morgan Walker Sinko, high school student from Texas. U.S.)
- 2011 winners
  - 28167 Andrewkim (Andrew Wooyoung Kim, high school student from Georgia, U.S.)
  - 28439 Miguelreyes (Miguel Arnold Silverio Reyes, high school student from Quezon City, Philippines)
  - 28442 Nicholashuey (Nicholas Michael Huey, high school student from Missouri, U.S.)
  - 28443 Crisara (Alexander Raymond Crisara, high school student from Texas, U.S.)
  - 28444 Alexrabii (Jahan Rabii, high school student from Texas, U.S.)
  - 28446 Davlantes (Christopher Joseph Davlantes, high school student from Florida, U.S.)
  - 28447 Arjunmathur (Arjun Mathur, high school student from Florida, U.S.)
  - 28449 Ericlau (Eric Lau, high school student from Georgia, U.S.)
  - 28450 Saravolz (Sara Ellen Volz, high school student from Colorado, U.S.)
  - 28451 Tylerhoward (Tyler Trettel Howard, high school student from Kansas, U.S.)
  - 28452 Natkondamuri (Nathan Sai Kondamuri, high school student from Indiana, U.S.)
  - 28453 Alexcecil (Alexander Michael Cecil, high school student from North Carolina, U.S.)
  - 28511 Marggraff (Blake Christopher Marggraff, high school student from California, U.S.)
  - 28538 Ruisong (Rui Song, high school student from Saskatchewan, Canada)
- 2014 winners
  - 31513 Lafazan, (high school student from Syosset, New York)
  - 31460 Jongsowfei, (Faye Jong Sow Fei, high school student from Sarawak, Malaysia)

=== Intel Science Talent Search ===
- 2002 Winners
  - 16113 Ahmed (Tahir Ahmed, high school student from New York, U.S.)
  - 16215 Venkatraman (Dheera Venkatraman, high school senior)
  - 16214 Venkatachalam (Vivek Venkatachalam, high school senior)
  - 16238 Chappe (Sean Chappe, high school teacher from New Jersey, U.S.)
- 2003 Winners
  - 15421 Adammalin (Adam Mikah Malin, a high school senior from New York, U.S.)
- 2005 Winners
  - 21411 Abifraeman (Abigail Ann Fraeman, a high school senior from Maryland, U.S.)
  - 21413 Albertsao (Albert Tsao, a high school senior from Massachusetts, U.S.)
- 2006 Winners
  - 22551 Adamsolomon (Adam Ross Solomon, a high school senior from New York, U.S.)
- 2008 Winners
  - 24121 Achandran (Ashok Chandran, a high school senior from New York, U.S.)
- 2009 Winners
  - 25410 Abejar (Patrick Jeffrey Abejar, a high school senior from New York, U.S.)
  - 25422 Abigreene (Abigail Sara Greene, a high school senior from New York, U.S.)
- 2010 Winners
  - 25966 Akhilmathew (Akhil Mathew, a high school senior from New Jersey, U.S.)
  - 25979 Alansage (Alan Robert Sage, a high school senior from New York, U.S.)
  - 27239 O'Dorney (Evan Michael O'Dorney, a high school senior from California, U.S.)
- 2011 Winners
  - 27072 Aggarwal (Amol Aggarwal, a high school senior from California, U.S.)
  - 27257 Tang-Quan (David Tang-Quan, a high school senior from California, U.S.A)
- 2012 Winners
  - 26200 Van Doren (Benjamin Van Doren, a high school senior from New York, U.S.)

== Editors and publishers ==
- 305 Gordonia (James Gordon Bennett Jr., publisher of the New York Herald)
- 6282 Edwelda (Edwin L. Aguirre and Imelda B. Joson, Filipino editors of Sky & Telescope)
- Editors of the Japanese monthly astronomical magazine Gekkan Tenmon Guide:
  - 9067 Katsuno (Gentaro Katsuno)
  - 11928 Akimotohiro (Hiroyuki Akimoto)

== Discoverers' relatives ==
- 2839 Annette (Annette Tombaugh, the discoverer's daughter)
- 3044 Saltykov (Nikita Saltykov, one of the discoverers' grandfathers)
- 10588 Adamcrandall (Adam Crandall Rees, the discoverer's stepson)
- 12848 Agostino (Agostino Boattini, the discoverer's father)
- 13691 Akie (Akie Asami, the discoverer's wife)
- 19524 Acaciacoleman (Acacia Coleman, the discoverer's granddaughter)
- 60001 Adélka (Adélka Kotková, the discoverer's daughter)

== Philanthropists ==
- 323 Brucia (Catherine Wolfe Bruce, astronomical philanthropist)
- 719 Albert (Albert Salomon von Rothschild, banker and benefactor of the Vienna Observatory)
- 904 Rockefellia (John D. Rockefeller, philanthropist)
- 1038 Tuckia (Edward Tuck, philanthropist)

== Wikipedians ==
- 59483 Corranplain (Corran Plain, American Wikipedian)

== Others ==
- 83 Beatrix (Beatrice Portinari, immortalized in Dante's Divine Comedy)
- 156 Xanthippe (Xanthippe, wife of Socrates)
- 609 Fulvia (Fulvia, wife of Mark Antony)
- 3018 Godiva (Lady Godiva)
- 3147 Samantha (Samantha Smith, peace activist)
- 4318 Baťa (Tomáš Baťa, founder of the Bata Shoes Company)
- 4487 Pocahontas (Pocahontas)
- 4987 Flamsteed (Ethelwin ("Win") Frances Flamsteed Moffatt, a direct descendant of the brother of John Flamsteed, the first Astronomer Royal of England)
- 6235 Burney (Venetia Burney, suggested the name "Pluto" for the planet discovered by Clyde Tombaugh in 1930)
- 7166 Kennedy (Malcolm Kennedy, secretary of the Astronomical Society of Glasgow)
- 10003 Caryhuang (Co-creator of The Scale of the Universe and Battle For Dream Island)
- 17702 Kryštofharant (Kryštof Harant, Czech nobleman)
- 19718 Albertjarvis (Albert G. Jarvis, inventor)
- 69275 Wiesenthal (Simon Wiesenthal, Nazi hunter)
- 80652 Albertoangela (Alberto Angela, Italian science writer)
- 241528 Tubman (Harriet Tubman, American abolitionist)
- 249521 Truth (Sojurner Truth, American abolitionist)
- 316201 Malala (Malala Yousafzai, a Pakistani activist for female education)

== Fictional characters ==
=== Characters in classic fiction ===
- 92 Undina (Undine, heroine of the novella Undine by Friedrich de la Motte Fouqué)
- 171 Ophelia (Ophelia, love interest of Prince Hamlet in William Shakespeare's Hamlet)
- 211 Isolda (Iseult, lover of the Arthurian knight Tristan)
- 264 Libussa (Libuše, mythical Bohemian prophetess)
- 571 Dulcinea (Dulcinea del Toboso, a character from Miguel de Cervantes' novel Don Quixote)
- 588 Achilles (Achilles, Greek hero of the Iliad)
- 617 Patroclus (Patroclus, Greek hero of the Iliad)
- 624 Hektor (Hector, Trojan hero of the Iliad)
- 911 Agamemnon (Agamemnon, Greek hero of the Iliad)
- 1143 Odysseus (Odysseus, legendary king of Ithaca)
- 1172 Äneas (Aeneas, prince of Troy)
- 1966 Tristan (Arthurian knight)
- 2041 Lancelot (Arthurian knight)
- 2054 Gawain (Arthurian knight)
- 2082 Galahad (Arthurian knight)
- 2095 Parsifal (Arthurian knight)
- 2483 Guinevere (Guinevere, King Arthur's queen)
- 2597 Arthur (King Arthur, legendary king of England)
- 2598 Merlin (Merlin, wizard who helped King Arthur)
- 3102 Krok (Krok, mythical Bohemian duke, father of Libuše, Kazi and Teta)
- 3180 Morgan (Morgan le Fay, enchantress in Arthurian legend)
- 3552 Don Quixote (Don Quixote, hero of the novel Don Quixote de la Mancha by Miguel de Cervantes)
- 5797 Bivoj (Bivoj, mythical Bohemian hero)
- 7695 Přemysl (Přemysl the Ploughman, mythical founder of the Přemyslid dynasty)
- 9551 Kazi (Kazi, Bohemian mythical female healer)
- 9713 Oceax (Oceax, son of Nauplius of Euboea and brother of Palamedes)
- 10764 Rübezahl (Rübezahl, Czech Krakonoš, giant ruler of the Giant Mountains)
- 12927 Pinocchio (Pinocchio, a fictional character and the main protagonist of the children's novel The Adventures of Pinocchio (1883) by the Italian writer Carlo Collodi.
- 15374 Teta (Teta, mythical Bohemian prophetess)
- 24601 Valjean (Jean Valjean, protagonist of the novel Les Misérables by Victor Hugo)
- 38086 Beowulf (Beowulf)

=== Characters in modern fiction ===
- 1683 Castafiore (Bianca Castafiore, the diva in Hergé's The Adventures of Tintin)
- 2309 Mr. Spock (Mr. Spock, the famous Vulcan, by way of the discoverer's cat)
- 2521 Heidi (title character in Johanna Spyri's well-known book Heidi)
- 2991 Bilbo (Bilbo Baggins, hero of The Hobbit)
- 4512 Sinuhe (title hero of The Egyptian by Mika Waltari)
- Characters created by Arthur Conan Doyle:
  - 5048 Moriarty (Professor Moriarty, archenemy of Sherlock Holmes)
  - 5049 Sherlock (Sherlock Holmes, detective)
  - 5050 Doctorwatson (Doctor Watson, sidekick of Sherlock Holmes)
- Characters created by Lewis Carroll in Alice in Wonderland:
  - 6042 Cheshirecat (the Cheshire Cat)
  - 6735 Madhatter (the Mad Hatter)
  - 6736 Marchare (the March Hare)
- Fabulous beasts described or mentioned by Lewis Carroll in Jabberwocky:
  - 7470 Jabberwock (the Jabberwock)
- 7796 Járacimrman (Jára Cimrman, a fictional Czech genius)
- 7896 Švejk (Josef Švejk, the good soldier)
- 9007 James Bond (James Bond, fictional spy created by Ian Fleming)
- 10160 Totoro (Totoro, character in the 1988 Japanese animated film My Neighbor Totoro)
- 12410 Donald Duck (Donald Duck, animal cartoon character created in 1934 at Walt Disney Productions)
- 12448 Mr. Tompkins (Mr. Tompkins, hero of science books by George Gamow)
- 12796 Kamenrider (Kamen Rider, Japanese hero created by Shotaro Ishinomori)
- 18610 Arthurdent (Arthur Dent, hapless protagonist in The Hitchhiker's Guide to the Galaxy series)
- 18996 Torasan (Tora-san, vagabond protagonist of the Otoko wa Tsurai yo film series)
- 20496 Jeník (Jeník, hero of Bedřich Smetana's opera The Bartered Bride)
- 20497 Mařenka (Mařenka, hero of Bedřich Smetana's opera The Bartered Bride)
- Comic strip characters by Goscinny and Uderzo:
  - 29401 Asterix (Asterix)
  - 29402 Obelix (Obélix)
- 29471 Spejbl (Spejbl, popular puppet character created by Josef Skupa)
- 29472 Hurvínek (Hurvínek, son of Spejbl, popular puppet character created by Josef Skupa)
- 33377 Večerníček (Večerníček, animated character inviting Czech children to watch evening TV fairytale)
- 46737 Anpanman (hero of the Japanese Anpanman picture book series whose head is made of bread filled with sweet bean paste)
- 58345 Moomintroll (Moomintroll, hero of books by Tove Jansson)
- 98494 Marsupilami (Marsupilami, character created by André Franquin)
- 697402 Ao (Ao Manaka, character in the Japanese manga series Asteroid in Love who dreams of discovering and naming an asteroid)
- Petit-Prince, moon of 45 Eugenia (The Little Prince, hero of book by Antoine de Saint-Exupéry)

== See also ==
- List of minor planets
- List of exceptional asteroids
- List of minor planets named after places
- List of minor planets named after rivers
- Meanings of minor planet names
- Stars named after people
- List of people with craters of the Moon named after them
