= Revelle =

Revelle may refer to:

- 13358 Revelle (1998 TA34) is a Main-belt Asteroid
- Revelle College, the first college founded at the University of California, San Diego
- Roger Revelle (1909–1991), scientist and scholar after whom Revelle College is named
- USNS Roger Revelle (T-AGOR-24), research vessel operated by Scripps Institution of Oceanography
- William Revelle, psychology professor at Northwestern University
- Douglas ReVelle (1964–2010), scientist who worked in meteoritic sciences

== See also ==
- Revelles, commune in the Somme département in the Picardie region of France
