= Smoluchowski =

Smoluchoiwski, feminine: Smoluchoiwska is a Polish surname. Notable people include:

- Marian Smoluchowski (1872–1917), Polish physicist who worked in the territories of the Austria-Hungary
- Roman Smoluchowski (1910–1996), Polish and American physicist, son of Marian
