= 898 Hildegard =

Asteroid

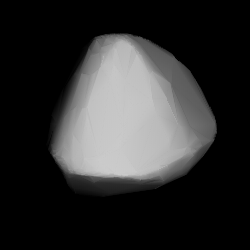
- Modelled shape of Hildegard from its lightcurve

Discovery
- Discovered by: M. F. Wolf
- Discovery site: Heidelberg Obs.
- Discovery date: 3 August 1918

Designations
- Pronunciation: /ˈhɪldɪɡɑːrd/
- Named after: Hildegard of Bingen (medieval abbess)
- Alternative designations: A918 PG · 1936 PA; 1918 EA
- Minor planet category: main-belt · (middle); background

Orbital characteristics
- Epoch 31 May 2020 (JD 2459000.5)
- Uncertainty parameter 0
- Observation arc: 101.51 yr (37,075 d)
- Aphelion: 3.7448 AU
- Perihelion: 1.7165 AU
- Semi-major axis: 2.7306 AU
- Eccentricity: 0.3714
- Orbital period (sidereal): 4.51 yr (1,648 d)
- Mean anomaly: 217.55°
- Mean motion: 0° 13^{m} 6.24^{s} / day
- Inclination: 10.086°
- Longitude of ascending node: 241.55°
- Argument of perihelion: 49.860°

Physical characteristics
- Mean diameter: 11.693±0.153 km
- Synodic rotation period: 24.855±0.002 h
- Pole ecliptic latitude: (344.0°, 27.0°) (λ_{1}/β_{1}); (164.0°, 8.0°) (λ_{2}/β_{2})
- Geometric albedo: 0.205±0.041
- Spectral type: SMASS = Sl
- Absolute magnitude (H): 11.7

898 Hildegard /ˈhɪldɪɡɑːrd/ is a bright background asteroid, approximately 12 kilometers (7.5 miles) in diameter, that is located in the central regions of the asteroid belt. It was discovered by German astronomer Max Wolf at the Heidelberg-Königstuhl State Observatory on 3 August 1918 and given the provisional designations A918 PG and 1918 EA. The stony S-type asteroid (Sl) has a rotation period of 24.9 hours and a relatively high orbital eccentricity of 0.37. It was probably named after Saint Hildegard of Bingen (1098–1179).

== Orbit and classification ==
Hildegard is a non-family asteroid of the main belt's background population when applying the hierarchical clustering method to its proper orbital elements. It orbits the Sun in the central asteroid belt at a distance of 1.7–3.7 AU once every 4 years and 6 months (1,648 days; semi-major axis of 2.73 AU). Its orbit has a high eccentricity of 0.37 and an inclination of 10° with respect to the ecliptic. With a perihelion of 1.72 AU, Hildegard is notably close of becoming an outer-grazer to Mars, which has its aphelion at 1.67 AU. The body's observation arc begins at Heidelberg Observatory with its official discovery observation on 3 August 1918.

== Naming ==
This minor planet was probably named after Saint Hildegard of Bingen (1098–1179). The Benedictine abbess is considered to be the founder of scientific natural history in Germany. The naming was also mentioned in The Names of the Minor Planets by Paul Herget in 1955 (H 87).

== Physical characteristics ==
In the Bus–Binzel SMASS classification, Hildegard is an Sl-subtype, which transitions from the common stony S-type to the uncommon L-type asteroid.

=== Rotation period ===
In April 2008, a rotational lightcurve of Hildegard was obtained from photometric observations by Australian amateur astronomer David Higgins. Lightcurve analysis gave a well-defined rotation period of 24.855±0.002 hours with a brightness variation of 0.36±0.01 magnitude (U=3). Previously in June 1999, observations by Brian Warner at his Palmer Divide Observatory (716) in Colorado only gave a period of above 24 hours and an amplitude larger than 0.3 magnitude (U=1). (Note: Lightcurve plot of (898) Hildegard, Palmer Divide Observatory, Brian Warner (1999). Rotation period larger than 24 hours with a brightness amplitude larger than 0.3 mag. Quality code is 1. Summary figures at the LCDB.) Asteroids with a rotation period near 24 hours are difficult to observe, since full coverage can not be obtained by a few consecutive nights of observation from a single observatory alone, due to Earth's nearly synchronous rotation. In such cases, international collaborations are highly useful with each observatory covering a different section of the lightcurve.

In 2016, a modeled lightcurve gave a concurring sidereal period of 24.8544±0.0005 hours using data from a large collaboration of individual observers (such as above). The study also determined two spin axes of (344.0°, 27.0°) and (164.0°, 8.0°) in ecliptic coordinates (λ, β).

=== Diameter and albedo ===
According to the survey carried out by the NEOWISE mission of NASA's Wide-field Infrared Survey Explorer, Hildegard measures 11.693±0.153 kilometers in diameter and its surface has an albedo of 0.205±0.041. The Collaborative Asteroid Lightcurve Link assumes a standard albedo for a stony asteroid of 0.20 and calculates a diameter of 13.58 kilometers based on an absolute magnitude of 11.7.
