= 598 Octavia =

Main-belt asteroid

Discovery
- Discovered by: Max Wolf
- Discovery site: Heidelberg
- Discovery date: 13 April 1906

Designations
- Pronunciation: /ɒkˈteɪviə/
- Alternative designations: 1906 UC

Orbital characteristics
- Epoch 31 July 2016 (JD 2457600.5)
- Uncertainty parameter 0
- Observation arc: 108.93 yr (39785 d)
- Aphelion: 3.4513 AU (516.31 Gm)
- Perihelion: 2.0788 AU (310.98 Gm)
- Semi-major axis: 2.7651 AU (413.65 Gm)
- Eccentricity: 0.24817
- Orbital period (sidereal): 4.60 yr (1679.4 d)
- Mean anomaly: 163.85°
- Mean motion: 0° 12^{m} 51.696^{s} / day
- Inclination: 12.211°
- Longitude of ascending node: 91.642°
- Argument of perihelion: 291.808°

Physical characteristics
- Mean radius: 36.165±1.95 km
- Synodic rotation period: 10.8903 h (0.45376 d)
- Geometric albedo: 0.0521±0.006
- Absolute magnitude (H): 9.53

598 Octavia is a minor planet orbiting the Sun. At 15:45 UTC on October 6, 2014, the 13.5 magnitude asteroid occulted with magnitude 8.1 TYC 1299-00020-1, and was visible in Taiwan.
