= Bertha Schwarz =

German opera singer

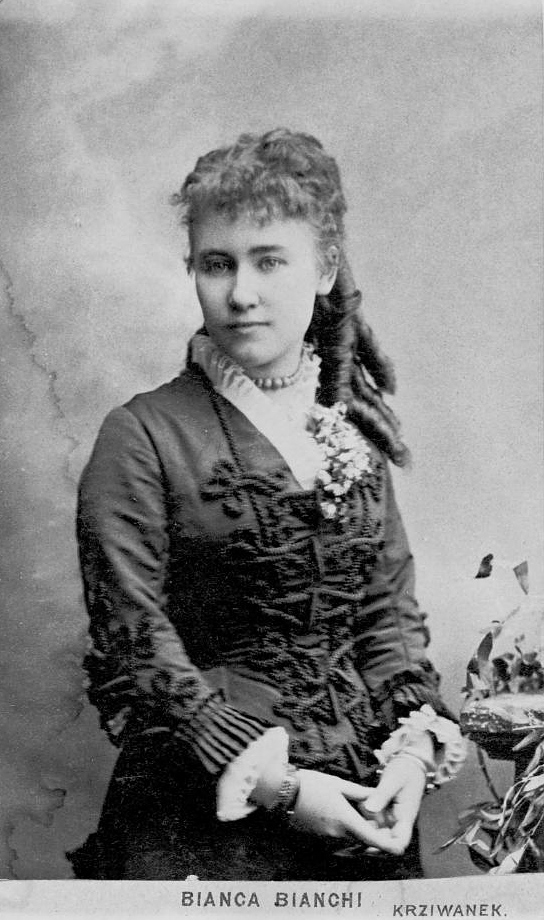
Bianca Bianchi

Bertha Schwarz (1855-1947), often known by her stage name Bianca Bianchi, was a German coloratura soprano opera singer of the late 19th century. Her greatest successes were in Vienna.

== Life ==
Schwarz was born in Heidelberg on 27 January 1855, the daughter of actors who worked at nearby Mannheim. As an opera singer, she was for many years a prominent member of the company of the Vienna Court Opera, where her fame was such that an asteroid discovered on 4 September 1880 was named 218 Bianca in her honour. Two years later Johann Strauss II was inspired by her to compose his Frühlingsstimmen waltz for orchestra and solo soprano voice, still familiar today.

Although based in Vienna, Bianchi sometimes performed in other cities of the German and Austrian empires, notably Hamburg, Karlsruhe and Budapest. In 1894, she married the impresario Bernard Pollini, who had been her manager. She died in Salzburg on 16 February 1947, aged 92.
