= 3936 Elst =

Stony Vestian asteroid from the inner regions of the asteroid belt

Discovery
- Discovered by: C. J. van Houten; I. van Houten-G. T. Gehrels
- Discovery site: Palomar Obs.
- Discovery date: 16 October 1977

Designations
- Named after: Eric W. Elst (Belgian astronomer)
- Alternative designations: 2321 T-3 · 1972 GY; 1973 TC · 1976 JG_{1} 1980 MB · 1981 WA_{2} 1984 MT · 1985 WS
- Minor planet category: main-belt · Vestian

Orbital characteristics
- Epoch 4 September 2017 (JD 2458000.5)
- Uncertainty parameter 0
- Observation arc: 45.05 yr (16,455 days)
- Aphelion: 2.7424 AU
- Perihelion: 2.1139 AU
- Semi-major axis: 2.4281 AU
- Eccentricity: 0.1294
- Orbital period (sidereal): 3.78 yr (1,382 days)
- Mean anomaly: 282.61°
- Mean motion: 0° 15^{m} 37.8^{s} / day
- Inclination: 5.6458°
- Longitude of ascending node: 240.74°
- Argument of perihelion: 38.474°

Physical characteristics
- Dimensions: 4.593±0.073 km 4.939±0.048 km 7.46 km (calculated)
- Synodic rotation period: 6.6322±0.0002 h (Note: Pravec (2007) web: rotation period 6.6322±0.0002 hours with a brightness amplitude of 0.13 magnitude and a Quality Code of 3 (see lightcurve plot). Summary figures for (3936) Elst at Collaborative Asteroid Lightcurve Link (CALL) and Ondřejov Asteroid Photometry Project website)
- Geometric albedo: 0.20 (assumed); 0.4607±0.0712; 0.509±0.096
- Spectral type: S
- Absolute magnitude (H): 13.0 · 13.36±0.24

3936 Elst, provisional designation 2321 T-3, is a stony Vestian asteroid from the inner regions of the asteroid belt, approximately 5 kilometers in diameter. The asteroid was discovered on 16 October 1977, by Dutch astronomer couple Ingrid and Cornelis van Houten at Leiden, on photographic plates taken by Dutch–American astronomer Tom Gehrels at Palomar Observatory in California, United States. It was named after Belgian astronomer Eric W. Elst.

== Orbit and classification ==
Elst is a stony S-type asteroid and member of the Vesta family. It orbits the Sun in the inner main-belt at a distance of 2.1–2.7 AU once every 3 years and 9 months (1,382 days). Its orbit has an eccentricity of 0.13 and an inclination of 6° with respect to the ecliptic. It was first identified as 1972 GY and 1973 TC at Crimea–Nauchnij, extending the body's observation arc by 4 years prior to its official discovery observation at Palomar.

== Physical characteristics ==
=== Lightcurve ===
In August 2007, a rotational lightcurve of Elst was obtained from photometric observations by Czech astronomer Petr Pravec at Ondřejov Observatory. Lightcurve analysis gave a well-defined rotation period of 6.6322 hours with a brightness amplitude of 0.13 magnitude (U=3).

=== Diameter and albedo ===
According to the survey carried out by NASA's Wide-field Infrared Survey Explorer with its subsequent NEOWISE mission, Elst measures 4.593 and 4.939 kilometers in diameter and its surface has an albedo of 0.4607 and 0.509, respectively, while the Collaborative Asteroid Lightcurve Link assumes a standard albedo for stony asteroids of 0.20 and consequently calculates a larger diameter of 7.46 kilometers based on an absolute magnitude of 13.0.

== Survey designation ==
The survey designation "T-3" stands for the third Palomar–Leiden Trojan survey, named after the fruitful collaboration of the Palomar and Leiden Observatory conducted in 1977. Gehrels used Palomar's Samuel Oschin telescope (also known as the 48-inch Schmidt Telescope), and shipped the photographic plates to Ingrid and Cornelis van Houten at Leiden Observatory where astrometry was carried out. The trio are credited with the discovery of several thousand minor planets.

== Naming ==
This minor planet was named in honor of Belgian astronomer Eric Walter Elst, one of the world's top discoverer of minor planets at Uccle Observatory in Belgium. The official naming citation was published by the Minor Planet Center on 28 April 1991 (M.P.C. 18138).
