= Jorge Núñez =

Jorge Núñez may refer to:

- Jorge Núñez (singer), American Idol season 8 contestant
- Jorge Núñez (athlete), Spanish Paralympic athlete
- Jorge Núñez (footballer, born 1978), Paraguayan football left-back
- Jorge Núñez (footballer, born 1984), Paraguayan football midfielder
- Jorge Nunez (football coach), Brazilian football coach
