= Roman Smoluchowski =

Polish physicist (1910 to 1996)

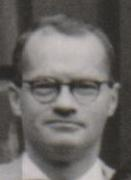
Roman Smoluchowski 1952 in London

Roman Smoluchowski (born 31 August 1910 in Zakopane; died 12 January 1996 in Austin, Texas) was a notable physicist who worked in Poland, and after World War II settled in Institute for Advanced Study in Princeton, New Jersey. He was the son of the statistical physics pioneer Marian Smoluchowski. In 1974, Roman Smoluchowski was awarded a Guggenheim Fellowship. In 1984, the minor planet 4530 Smoluchowski was named after him.

== Education and Career ==
Smoluchowski had a prominent career in industrial and academic research in physics and astrophysics. He graduated from the University of Warsaw with a Master's degree in 1933, and from the University of Groningen in 1935. He spent a post-doctoral year at the Institute for Advanced Study in Princeton. After that he returned to Poland to head the Department of Physics and Metals at the University of Warsaw. Once he escaped the horrors of war and returned to the USA, he became a research physicist at the General Electric Research Laboratory in Schenectady, New York. He worked on intelligence matters there, and among the pieces of information to which he had access to was a list of Polish citizens scheduled for capture and execution by the Germans. His own name was on that list.

In 1946, Roman became an associate professor of metallurgy at the Carnegie Institute of Technology, and then professor of physics in 1950. In the 1950's he associated with the solid-state physics group at the Brookhaven National Laboratory. He was awarded a Fulbright Fellow at the Sorbonne in 1956. In 1960, he worked at Princeton University as a professor and as the first director of the interdisciplinary program in solid state and materials science in the Department of Mechanical Engineering. In 1978 Roman retired from Princeton and became a professor at the University of Texas in Austin in both departments of astronomy and physics.

== Escape from War ==
Roman escaped to Sweden from Poland in 1939, when Warsaw was caught between the Russian and German fronts. From Sweden he went to Norway, where he caught a freighter headed for the US only days before Germany invaded Norway.

== Awards and honors ==
- Brazil Acad Scis
- Fellow AAAS
- Finnish Acad Scis
- 1984: Planet 4530 Smoluchowski named after him
- 1976: Jurzykowski Award
- 1974: Guggenheim Fellowship
- 1956: Fulbright Fellowship
- 1938: U of Liège Lect Medal
