= 712 Boliviana =

Main-belt asteroid

Discovery
- Discovered by: Max Wolf
- Discovery site: Heidelberg Obs.
- Discovery date: 19 March 1911

Designations
- Alternative designations: 1911 LO, 1966 KD, 1972 XL_{2}
- Minor planet category: Asteroid belt

Orbital characteristics
- Epoch 31 July 2016 (JD 2457600.5)
- Uncertainty parameter 0
- Observation arc: 105.07 yr (38378 d)
- Aphelion: 3.05611062 AU (457.187641 Gm)
- Perihelion: 2.0926983 AU (313.06321 Gm)
- Semi-major axis: 2.574404470 AU (385.1254270 Gm)
- Eccentricity: 0.18711362
- Orbital period (sidereal): 4.13 yr (1508.7 d)
- Mean anomaly: 218.926658°
- Mean motion: 0° 14^{m} 18.997^{s} / day
- Inclination: 12.7650478°
- Longitude of ascending node: 230.827767°
- Argument of perihelion: 181.662560°

Physical characteristics
- Mean diameter: 136.9±3.4 km (composite estimate)
- Mass: (1.68±0.31)×10^{18} kg (2025) (Note: Calculated from its standard gravitational parameter GM = 0.112±0.021 km^{3}/s^{2}.) (1.66±0.61)×10^{18} kg (2023)
- Mean density: 1.67 g/cm^{3} (2025) (Note: Assuming a diameter of 124 km.); 1.23±0.46 g/cm^{3} (2023) (Note: Assuming a diameter of 136.9 ± 3.4 km.)
- Synodic rotation period: 11.7426 h (0.48928 d)
- Geometric albedo: 0.0510±0.002
- Spectral type: C (Tholen), X (SMASSII)
- Absolute magnitude (H): 8.32; B−V=0.74, U−B=0.35

712 Boliviana is a C-type asteroid from the asteroid belt, with the type indicating the surface has a low albedo with high carbonaceous content. The spectra of the asteroid displays evidence of aqueous alteration. It is named after Simón Bolívar.

Boliviana was observed by Arecibo radar 2005 Oct 29-Nov 1.
