= 2436 Hatshepsut =

Main-belt asteroid

Discovery
- Discovered by: C. J. van Houten; I. van Houten-G. T. Gehrels
- Discovery site: Palomar Obs.
- Discovery date: 24 September 1960

Designations
- Pronunciation: /hætˈʃɛpsʊt/
- Named after: Hatshepsut (Egyptian pharaoh)
- Alternative designations: 6066 P-L · 1963 DL; 1978 YA_{1}
- Minor planet category: main-belt · outer Hygiea

Orbital characteristics
- Epoch 4 September 2017 (JD 2458000.5)
- Uncertainty parameter 0
- Observation arc: 56.19 yr (20,525 days)
- Aphelion: 3.4952 AU
- Perihelion: 2.8672 AU
- Semi-major axis: 3.1812 AU
- Eccentricity: 0.0987
- Orbital period (sidereal): 5.67 yr (2,072 days)
- Mean anomaly: 236.21°
- Mean motion: 0° 10^{m} 25.32^{s} / day
- Inclination: 4.1037°
- Longitude of ascending node: 233.75°
- Argument of perihelion: 293.38°

Physical characteristics
- Mean diameter: 18.813±0.273
- Synodic rotation period: 8.9834 h
- Geometric albedo: 0.066±0.006
- Spectral type: C (assumed)
- Absolute magnitude (H): 12.2 · 12.67

2436 Hatshepsut /hætˈʃɛpsʊt/, provisional designation 6066 P-L, is a Hygiean asteroid from the outer asteroid belt, approximately 19 kilometers in diameter. It was discovered by Cornelis van Houten, Ingrid van Houten-Groeneveld and Tom Gehrels at Palomar Observatory on 24 September 1960. It was named for pharaoh Hatshepsut.

== Orbit and characterization ==
Hatshepsut is a member of the Hygiea family (601), a very large family of carbonaceous outer-belt asteroids, named after the fourth-largest asteroid, 10 Hygiea. It orbits the Sun in the outer main-belt at a distance of 2.9–3.5 AU once every 5 years and 8 months (2,072 days). Its orbit has an eccentricity of 0.10 and an inclination of 4° with respect to the ecliptic. Its orbit is only slightly eccentric and not much inclined to the ecliptic. The asteroid rotates around its axis every 9 hours.

== Survey designation ==
The survey designation "P-L" stands for Palomar–Leiden, named after Palomar Observatory and Leiden Observatory, which collaborated on the fruitful Palomar–Leiden survey in the 1960s. Gehrels used Palomar's Samuel Oschin telescope (also known as the 48-inch Schmidt Telescope), and shipped the photographic plates to Ingrid and Cornelis van Houten at Leiden Observatory where astrometry was carried out. The trio are credited with the discovery of several thousand asteroid discoveries.

== Naming ==
This minor planet named after the only female pharaoh to reign over ancient Egypt, Hatshepsut. The approved naming citation was published on 22 September 1983 (M.P.C. 8153).
