= Petr Horálek =

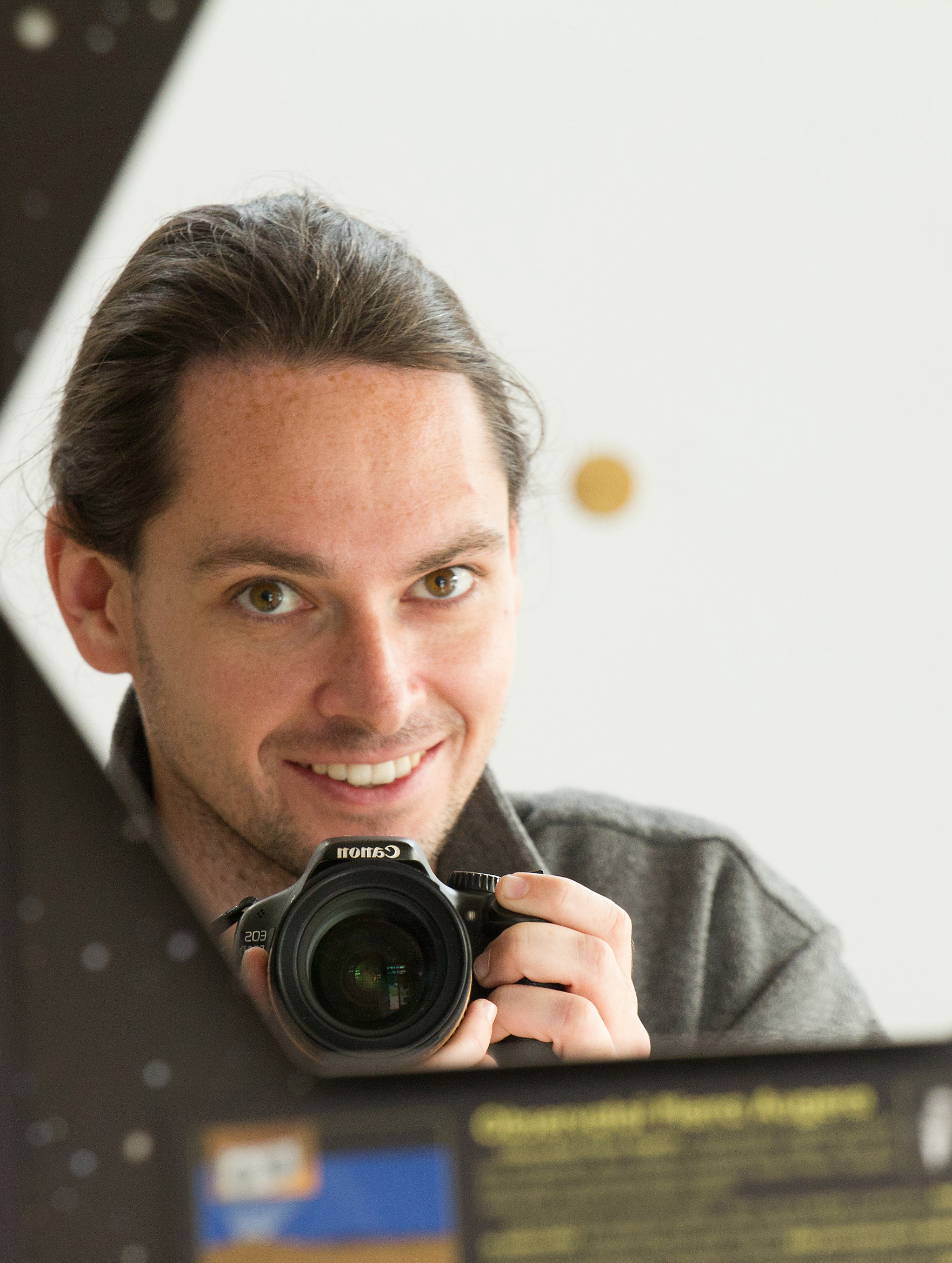
- Petr Horálek in January 2015
- Born: July 21, 1986 (age 39); Pardubice, Czech Republic
- Known for: Astrophotographer
- Website: petrhoralek.com

Petr Horálek (born July 21, 1986) is a Czech astrophotographer, popularizer of astronomy and an artist.

== Astronomy and astrophotography ==
=== Early life ===
Horálek worked as a volunteer at the Pardubice observatory from 1999–2010 and studied theoretical physics and astrophysics at Masaryk University in Brno (2007–2011). In 2011, he took up astrophotography.

=== Astrophotography ===
Horálek specializes in photographing rare night-sky phenomena and photographs with the night sky over terrestrial foregrounds. In January 2015, he became the 22nd Photo Ambassador of the European Southern Observatory (ESO). He focuses mostly on high-definition fulldome and panoramic images of the night sky over ESO observatories.

Horálek is the Czech delegate of the International Dark Sky Association. Since 2020 he has worked at the Institute of Physics in Opava.

In 2012, he recorded a bright Perseid fireball on August 12, 2012, which was analyzed by P. Spurný at al. in a study published in Astronomy & Astrophysics magazine. In 2016, he took images of the zodiacal light over the ESO La Silla Observatory which revealed structures in the zodiacal band. His image was published in the ESO Messenger 164 (June 2016) as well as the ESO Picture of the Week

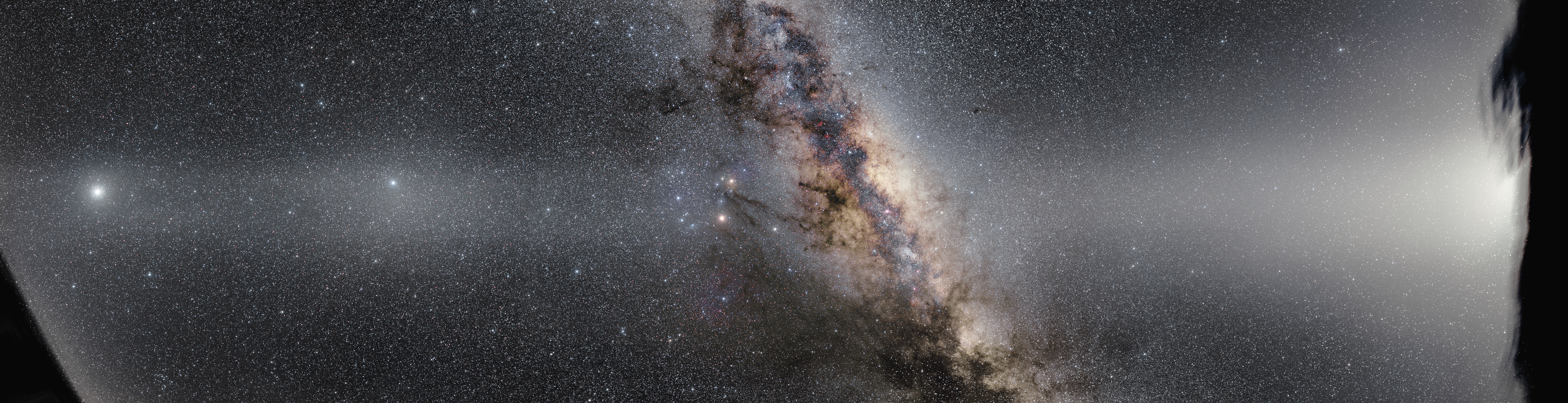
The zodiacal light over ESO La Silla Observatory, captured by Petr Horálek in April 2016

=== Awards ===
Horálek's images have been used 40 times as NASA's Astronomy Picture of the Day, ESO Picture of the Week, and Czech Astrophotography of the Month. In October 2015 the International Astronomical Union named the asteroid (6822) 1986 UO after him with the permanent designation 6822 Horálek.

== Asteroid 6822 Horálek ==
Asteroid 6822 Horálek or (6822) 1986 UO was discovered by Zdeňka Vavrová on October 28, 1986, at Kleť Observatory, the Czech Republic. It is about 5 km wide asteroid orbiting the Sun in the Main asteroid belt with perihelion at 1.943 AU and aphelion 3.235 AU from the Sun

=== MPC Citation for 6822 Horálek ===
Petr Horálek (b. 1986) is a Czech astronomer, astronomy popularizer, passionate photographer, and one of the ESO Photo Ambassadors. He travels the globe to observe solar and lunar eclipses. His breathtaking photographs capture the beauty of the night sky and its harmony with the landscape. [Ref: Minor Planet Circ. 95803]
