= 326 Tamara =

Main-belt asteroid

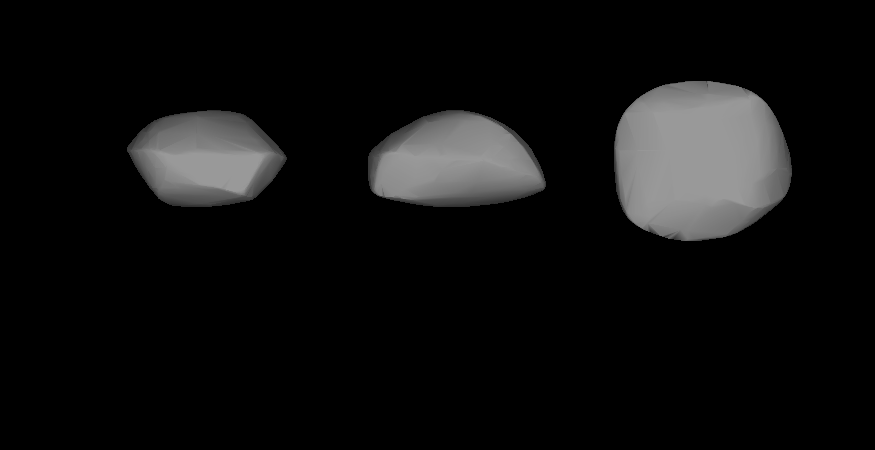
- Lightcurve-base 3D-model of 326 Tamara.

Discovery
- Discovered by: Johann Palisa
- Discovery date: 19 March 1892

Designations
- Pronunciation: /ˈtæmərə/
- Named after: Tamar of Georgia
- Minor planet category: Main belt

Orbital characteristics
- Epoch 31 July 2016 (JD 2457600.5)
- Uncertainty parameter 0
- Observation arc: 122.57 yr (44770 d)
- Aphelion: 2.75738 AU (412.498 Gm)
- Perihelion: 1.87764 AU (280.891 Gm)
- Semi-major axis: 2.31751 AU (346.695 Gm)
- Eccentricity: 0.18980
- Orbital period (sidereal): 3.53 yr (1288.6 d)
- Mean anomaly: 26.2160°
- Mean motion: 0° 16^{m} 45.714^{s} / day
- Inclination: 23.7294°
- Longitude of ascending node: 32.2069°
- Time of perihelion: 2023-May-19
- Argument of perihelion: 238.542°

Physical characteristics
- Mean diameter: 77+5 −10 km 81 ± 9 km (alternate pole solution)
- Mass: (9.0±12)×10^{17} kg (Note: Calculated from its standard gravitational parameter GM = 0.06±0.08 km^{3}/s^{2}.) (SB441)
- Mean density: 5.0+6.8 −7.0 g/cm^{3} (calculated); 4.3±5.9 g/cm^{3} (alternate pole solution)
- Synodic rotation period: 14.46130 ± 0.0005 h 14.46136 ± 0.0004 h (alternate pole solution)
- Pole ecliptic longitude: 79° ± 1° 242° ± 1° (alternate pole solution)
- Pole ecliptic latitude: −3° ± 3° −36° ± 3° (alternate pole solution)
- Geometric albedo: 0.0368±0.001
- Spectral type: C
- Absolute magnitude (H): 9.36

326 Tamara is a large Main belt asteroid. It is classified as a C-type asteroid and is probably composed of carbonaceous material. It is the largest member and namesake of the Tamara Family, a 264 million year-old sub-family of the collisional Phocaea family.

It was discovered by Johann Palisa on 19 March 1892 in Vienna and is named after Tamar of Georgia. Name was given by Grand Duke George Alexandrovich of Russia.
