= 4001 Ptolemaeus =

Main-belt asteroid

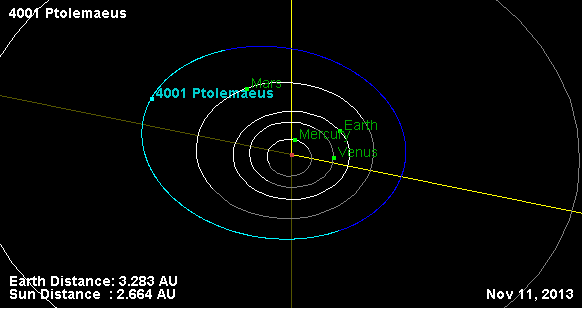
- Orbit of 4001 Ptolemaeus

Discovery
- Discovered by: K. Reinmuth
- Discovery site: Heidelberg Obs.
- Discovery date: 2 August 1949

Designations
- Pronunciation: /tɒləˈmiːəs/
- Named after: Ptolemy (Greco-Roman astronomer)
- Alternative designations: 1949 PV · 1949 QD_{1} 1982 BU_{9} · 1987 OE
- Minor planet category: main-belt · (inner); Flora

Orbital characteristics
- Epoch 23 March 2018 (JD 2458200.5)
- Uncertainty parameter 0
- Observation arc: 67.75 yr (24,744 d)
- Aphelion: 2.6809 AU
- Perihelion: 1.8940 AU
- Semi-major axis: 2.2874 AU
- Eccentricity: 0.1720
- Orbital period (sidereal): 3.46 yr (1,264 d)
- Mean anomaly: 294.51°
- Mean motion: 0° 17^{m} 5.64^{s} / day
- Inclination: 5.4568°
- Longitude of ascending node: 130.67°
- Argument of perihelion: 204.09°

Physical characteristics
- Mean diameter: 4.641±0.297 km 5.0 km (est. at 0.24)
- Geometric albedo: 0.392±0.056
- Spectral type: SMASS = S
- Absolute magnitude (H): 13.7

4001 Ptolemaeus, provisional designation 1949 PV, is a Florian asteroid from the inner regions of the asteroid belt, approximately 5 kilometers (3.1 miles) in diameter. It was discovered on 2 August 1949, by German astronomer Karl Reinmuth at the Heidelberg-Königstuhl State Observatory in Heidelberg, Germany. In 1991, the International Astronomical Union named the S-type asteroid after Greco-Roman astronomer Ptolemy.

== Orbit and classification ==
Ptolemaeus is a member of the Flora family (402), a giant asteroid family and the largest family of stony asteroids in the main-belt. It orbits the Sun in the inner main-belt at a distance of 1.9–2.7 AU once every 3 years and 6 months (1,264 days; semi-major axis of 2.29 AU). Its orbit has an eccentricity of 0.17 and an inclination of 5° with respect to the ecliptic.

The body's observation arc begins with its observations as 1949 QD_{1} at Lowell Observatory on 24 August 1949, or three weeks after its official discovery observation at Heidelberg. On 24 April 1989, Ptolemaeus approached the asteroid 6 Hebe within 5.5 million kilometers at a relative velocity of 3.7 km/s.

== Physical characteristics ==
In the SMASS classification, Ptolemaeus is a common, stony S-type asteroid, which is in agreement with the overall spectral type for members of the Flora family.

=== Diameter and albedo ===
According to the survey carried out by the NEOWISE mission of NASA's Wide-field Infrared Survey Explorer, Ptolemaeus measures 4.641 kilometers in diameter and its surface has a high albedo of 0.392. Based on a generic magnitude-to-diameter conversion, assuming a Flora-type typical albedo of 0.24, the asteroid measures 5.0 kilometers for an absolute magnitude of 13.7.

=== Rotation period ===
As of 2018, no rotational lightcurve of Ptolemaeus has been obtained from photometric observations. Its rotation period, poles and shape remain unknown.

== Naming ==
This minor planet was named after 2nd-century Greco-Roman astronomer Ptolemy (Latin: "Ptolemaeus") by IAU's Minor Planet Names Committee. He is best known for his influential Almagest, a mathematical and astronomical treatise on the apparent motions of the stars and planetary paths. Its ideas dominated astronomy for 1200 years until Copernicus in the early Renaissance. The official naming citation was published by the Minor Planet Center on 21 November 1991 (M.P.C. 19335).
