= 218 Bianca =

Main-belt asteroid

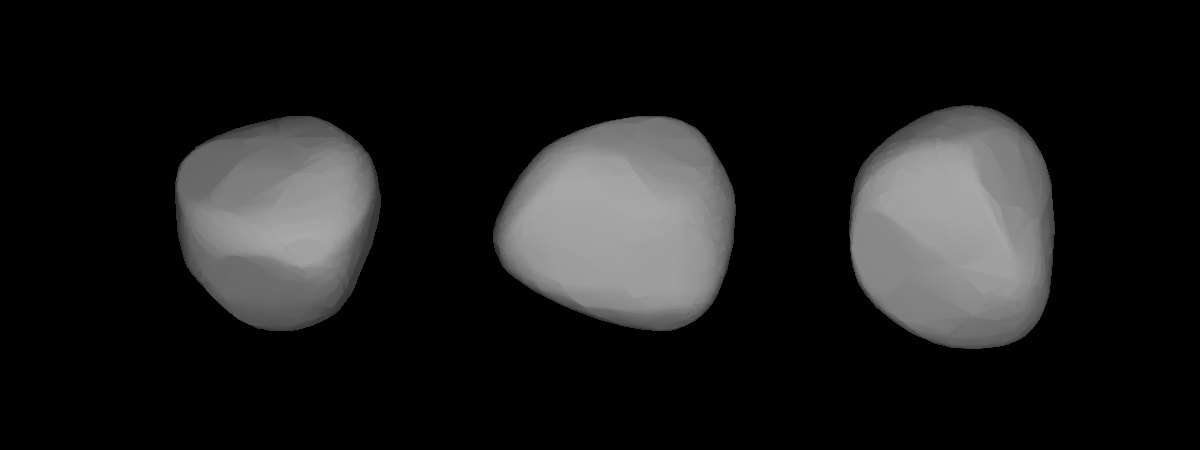
- A three-dimensional model of 218 Bianca based on its lightcurve

Discovery
- Discovered by: Johann Palisa
- Discovery date: 4 September 1880

Designations
- Pronunciation: /biˈæŋkə/
- Named after: Bianca Bianchi
- Alternative designations: A880 RA
- Minor planet category: Main belt

Orbital characteristics
- Epoch 31 July 2016 (JD 2457600.5)
- Uncertainty parameter 0
- Observation arc: 122.41 yr (44709 d)
- Aphelion: 2.97915 AU (445.674 Gm)
- Perihelion: 2.35524 AU (352.339 Gm)
- Semi-major axis: 2.66719 AU (399.006 Gm)
- Eccentricity: 0.11696
- Orbital period (sidereal): 4.36 yr (1591.0 d)
- Average orbital speed: 18.24 km/s
- Mean anomaly: 170.102°
- Mean motion: 0° 13^{m} 34.565^{s} / day
- Inclination: 15.2006°
- Longitude of ascending node: 170.635°
- Argument of perihelion: 63.0175°

Physical characteristics
- Dimensions: 60.62±1.4 km 56.735 km
- Mass: (4.8±1.2)×10^{17} kg (Note: Calculated from its standard gravitational parameter GM = 0.032±0.008 km^{3}/s^{2}.)
- Mean density: 4.12 g/cm^{3} (Note: Assuming a diameter of 60.6 km.)
- Synodic rotation period: 6.337 h (0.2640 d); 6.33717 h
- Geometric albedo: 0.1746±0.008; 0.1979 ± 0.0407
- Spectral type: S (Tholen)
- Absolute magnitude (H): 8.60, 8.607

218 Bianca is a sizeable main belt asteroid. It is an S-type asteroid. It was discovered by Johann Palisa on 4 September 1880, in Pola and was named after the Austro-Hungarian opera singer Bianca Bianchi (real name Bertha Schwarz). The Vienna newspapers contained several published accounts of the circumstances surrounding the honor extended to the diva in Spring 1882. In the late 1990s, a network of astronomers worldwide gathered lightcurve data that was ultimately used to derive the spin states and shape models of ten new asteroids, including (218) Bianca. The shape model for this asteroid is asymmetrical.
