= 904 Rockefellia =

Main-belt asteroid

Discovery
- Discovered by: M. F. Wolf
- Discovery site: Heidelberg Obs.
- Discovery date: 29 October 1918

Designations
- Named after: John D. Rockefeller (American business magnate)
- Alternative designations: A918 UC · 1949 UK; 1961 AK · A913 UD; A916 KC · 1918 EO; 1913 UD · 1916 KC
- Minor planet category: main-belt · (outer) background

Orbital characteristics
- Epoch 31 May 2020 (JD 2459000.5)
- Uncertainty parameter 0
- Observation arc: 106.24 yr (38,805 d)
- Aphelion: 3.2567 AU
- Perihelion: 2.7366 AU
- Semi-major axis: 2.9967 AU
- Eccentricity: 0.0868
- Orbital period (sidereal): 5.19 yr (1,895 d)
- Mean anomaly: 178.00°
- Mean motion: 0° 11^{m} 24^{s} / day
- Inclination: 15.147°
- Longitude of ascending node: 198.08°
- Argument of perihelion: 251.78°

Physical characteristics
- Mean diameter: 49.146±0.763 km; 58.75±1.7 km; 61.36±0.77 km
- Synodic rotation period: 6.826±0.004 h
- Geometric albedo: 0.051±0.002; 0.055±0.009; 0.0561±0.003
- Spectral type: Caa (S3OS2-TH); Ch (S3OS2-BB)
- Absolute magnitude (H): 10.4

904 Rockefellia (prov. designation: A918 UC or 1918 EO) is a dark and large background asteroid from the outer regions of the asteroid belt, that measures approximately 59 kilometers (37 miles) in diameter. It was discovered on 29 October 1918, by German astronomer Max Wolf at the Heidelberg-Königstuhl State Observatory. The carbonaceous C-type asteroid (Ch) has a rotation period of 6.8 hours and is rather spherical in shape. It was named after American philanthropist and oil industrialist John D. Rockefeller (1839–1937).

== Orbit and classification ==
Rockefellia is a non-family asteroid of the main belt's background population when applying the hierarchical clustering method to its proper orbital elements. It orbits the Sun in the outer asteroid belt at a distance of 2.7–3.3 AU once every 5 years and 2 months (1,895 days; semi-major axis of 3 AU). Its orbit has an eccentricity of 0.09 and an inclination of 15° with respect to the ecliptic. The asteroid was first observed as A913 UD (1913 UD) at the Simeiz Observatory on 28 October 1913, and three nights later at Heidelberg Observatory as well. The body's observation arc begins at Heidelberg on 6 December 1918, or five weeks after its official discovery observation.

== Naming ==
This minor planet was named after John D. Rockefeller (1839–1937), an American philanthropist and oilman who founded the Rockefeller Foundation. The official naming citation was mentioned in The Names of the Minor Planets by Paul Herget in 1955 (H 87).

== Physical characteristics ==
In the Tholen- and SMASS-like taxonomy of the Small Solar System Objects Spectroscopic Survey (S3OS2), Rockefellia is a Caa and Ch type, respectively, both indicating that it is a hydrated, carbonaceous C-type asteroid.

=== Rotation period ===
In December 2017, a rotational lightcurve of Rockefellia was obtained from photometric observations by Tom Polakis at the Command Module Observatory (V02) in Arizona. Lightcurve analysis gave a rotation period of 6.826±0.004 hours with a low brightness variation of 0.14±0.03 magnitude (U=2). The result supersedes tentative period determinations by Pierre Antonini (2009), Stephane Fauvaud (2011) and René Roy (2014), which were of lower quality (U=1/2/1).

=== Diameter and albedo ===
According to the survey carried out by the NEOWISE mission of NASA's Wide-field Infrared Survey Explorer (WISE), the Infrared Astronomical Satellite IRAS, and the Japanese Akari satellite, Rockefellia measures (49.146±0.763), (58.75±1.7) and (61.36±0.77) kilometers in diameter and its surface has an albedo of (0.055±0.009), (0.0561±0.003) and (0.051±0.002), respectively. The Collaborative Asteroid Lightcurve Link derives an albedo of 0.0357 and calculates a diameter of 58.51 kilometers based on an absolute magnitude of 10.4. Alternative mean diameter measurements published by the WISE team include (48.96±16.97 km), (52.127±3.976 km), (54.859±14.983 km) and (55.321±19.554 km) with corresponding albedos of (0.05±0.05), (0.071±0.010) and (0.04±0.03) and (0.042±0.033).

On 13 May 2005, an asteroid occultation gave a best-fit ellipse dimension of 59.0 × 59.0 kilometers. These timed observations are taken when the asteroid passes in front of a distant star. However the quality of the measurement is rated poorly. A second, lower rated observation on 23 February 2013, measured an ellipse of 61.0 × 61.0 kilometers.
