= 1815 Beethoven =

Carbonaceous main-belt asteroid

Discovery
- Discovered by: K. Reinmuth
- Discovery site: Heidelberg Obs.
- Discovery date: 27 January 1932

Designations
- Named after: Ludwig van Beethoven (German composer)
- Alternative designations: 1932 CE_{1} · 1938 EP; 1952 SO · 1954 BD; 1958 TJ · 1969 UY_{1} 1971 BN_{1}
- Minor planet category: main-belt · (outer) background

Orbital characteristics
- Epoch 27 April 2019 (JD 2458600.5)
- Uncertainty parameter 0
- Observation arc: 86.62 yr (31,638 d)
- Aphelion: 3.7534 AU
- Perihelion: 2.5495 AU
- Semi-major axis: 3.1515 AU
- Eccentricity: 0.1910
- Orbital period (sidereal): 5.59 yr (2,043 d)
- Mean anomaly: 206.51°
- Mean motion: 0° 10^{m} 34.32^{s} / day
- Inclination: 2.7406°
- Longitude of ascending node: 110.81°
- Argument of perihelion: 358.50°

Physical characteristics
- Mean diameter: 23.74±7.79 km 29.82±0.28 km 30.36±2.2 km 30.598±0.168 km 32.74±1.30 km 33.899±0.294 km
- Synodic rotation period: 54±1 h
- Geometric albedo: 0.0439; 0.048; 0.0548; 0.057; 0.09; 0.104
- Spectral type: Tholen = F C0 (Barucci); B–V = 0.617; U–B = 0.330
- Absolute magnitude (H): 11.33; 11.36

1815 Beethoven, provisional designation 1932 CE_{1}, is a carbonaceous background asteroid from the outer regions of the asteroid belt, approximately 30 kilometers (19 miles) in diameter. It was discovered on 27 January 1932, by German astronomer Karl Reinmuth at the Heidelberg Observatory. The uncommon F-type asteroid seems to have a long rotation period of 54 hours (tentative). It was named after Ludwig van Beethoven.

== Orbit and classification ==
Beethoven is a non-family asteroid from the main belt's background population when applying the hierarchical clustering method to its proper orbital elements. Based on osculating Keplerian orbital elements and in previous analysis by Zappalà, the asteroid has also been classified as a member of the Themis family (602), a very large family of carbonaceous asteroids, named after 24 Themis.

It orbits the Sun in the outer main-belt at a distance of 2.5–3.8 AU once every 5 years and 7 months (2,043 days; semi-major axis of 3.15 AU). Its orbit has an eccentricity of 0.19 and an inclination of 3° with respect to the ecliptic. The body's observation arc begins with its official discovery observation at Heidelberg in January 1992.

== Naming ==
This minor planet was named after German composer Ludwig van Beethoven (1770-1827). The official naming citation was published by the Minor Planet Center on 20 February 1976 (M.P.C. 3935).

== Physical characteristics ==
In the Tholen classification, Beethoven is an uncommon, carbonaceous F-type asteroid, while in the Barucci taxonomy, it is a C0 type.

=== Rotation period ===
In January 2005, a fragmentary rotational lightcurve of Beethoven was obtained from photometric observations by Robert Stephens at his Santana Observatory (646) in California. Lightcurve analysis gave a rotation period of 54±1 hours with a brightness amplitude of 0.2 magnitude (U=1).

=== Diameter and albedo ===
According to the surveys carried out by the Infrared Astronomical Satellite IRAS, the Japanese Akari satellite and several publications by the NEOWISE mission of NASA's Wide-field Infrared Survey Explorer, Beethoven measures between 23.7 and 33.9 kilometers in diameter and its surface has an albedo between 0.04 and 0.10.

The Collaborative Asteroid Lightcurve Link adopts the results obtained by IRAS, that is, an albedo of 0.0548 and a diameter of 30.36 kilometers based on an absolute magnitude of 11.36.
