= 12838 Adamsmith =

Main-belt asteroid

Discovery
- Discovered by: E. W. Elst
- Discovery site: La Silla Obs.
- Discovery date: 9 March 1997

Designations
- Named after: Adam Smith (moral philosopher)
- Alternative designations: 1997 EL_{55} · 1987 DX_{6} 1997 HO_{14} · 1999 RX_{2}
- Minor planet category: main-belt · Koronis

Orbital characteristics
- Epoch 4 September 2017 (JD 2458000.5)
- Uncertainty parameter 0
- Observation arc: 30.19 yr (11,026 days)
- Aphelion: 3.0762 AU
- Perihelion: 2.6925 AU
- Semi-major axis: 2.8843 AU
- Eccentricity: 0.0665
- Orbital period (sidereal): 4.90 yr (1,789 days)
- Mean anomaly: 194.63°
- Mean motion: 0° 12^{m} 4.32^{s} / day
- Inclination: 1.1631°
- Longitude of ascending node: 322.05°
- Argument of perihelion: 89.801°

Physical characteristics
- Dimensions: 6.16 km (calculated)
- Synodic rotation period: 10.9090±0.0031 h
- Geometric albedo: 0.24 (assumed)
- Spectral type: S
- Absolute magnitude (H): 13.0 · 12.70±0.34 · 12.770±0.002 (R) · 13.22

12838 Adamsmith, provisional designation 1997 EL_{55}, is a stony Koronis asteroid from the outer region of the asteroid belt, approximately 6 kilometers in diameter. The asteroid was discovered on 9 March 1997, by Belgian astronomer Eric Walter Elst at ESO's La Silla Observatory in northern Chile. It was named after Scottish philosopher and economist Adam Smith.

== Orbit and classification ==
Adamsmith is a member of the Koronis family, a group of co-planar, stony asteroids in the outer main-belt, named after 158 Koronis. It orbits the Sun at a distance of 2.7–3.1 AU once every 4 years and 11 months (1,789 days). Its orbit has an eccentricity of 0.07 and an inclination of 1° with respect to the ecliptic.

It was first identified as 1987 DX_{6} at the discovering observatory in 1987, extending the asteroid's observation arc by 10 years prior to its official discovery observation.

== Physical characteristics ==
In January 2011, a rotational lightcurve of Adamsmith was obtained from photometric observations by astronomers at the Palomar Transient Factory in California. Lightcurve analysis gave a rotation period of 10.9090 hours with a brightness variation of 0.48 magnitude (U=2).

The Collaborative Asteroid Lightcurve Link assumes a standard albedo for stony Koronian asteroids of 0.24 and calculates a diameter of 6.2 kilometers with an absolute magnitude of 13.22.

== Naming ==
This minor planet was named for the economist Adam Smith (1723–1790), Scottish moral philosopher and principal figure in the Scottish Enlightenment. Known for his works The Theory of Moral Sentiments (1759) and An Inquiry into the Nature and Causes of the Wealth of Nations (1776), he introduced the concept of the division of labour which represents a qualitative increase in productivity, and suggested that self-interest and competition can lead to economic prosperity. The approved naming citation was published by the Minor Planet Center 30 July 2007 (M.P.C. 60299).
