= Douglas ReVelle =

Douglas Orson ReVelle
- Born: December 7, 1945; Rochester, NY
- Died: May 2, 2010 (aged 64); Albuquerque
- Citizenship: United States
- Known for: meteors, infrasound
- Scientific career
- Fields: aeronomy, meteorites

Douglas O. ReVelle (December 7, 1945 – May 2, 2010) was an American scientist, who worked for the Earth and Environmental Sciences Division of the Los Alamos National Laboratory.

== Biography ==
ReVelle received his bachelor's degree in meteorology and oceanography in 1968, followed by a master's degree in aeronomy and planetary atmospheres in 1970 and finally his doctorate in atmospheric science in 1974. All of these degrees were from the department of atmospheric ocean and space sciences at the University of Michigan, Ann Arbor. His thesis work was about acoustics of meteors. He then became a post doctoral fellow at the Herzberg Institute of Astrophysics in Ottawa, and subsequently at the Carnegie Institution in Washington with George Wetherill at the Department of Terrestrial Magnetism. From 1994 to 2010 he worked as an atmospheric physicist in the Earth and Environmental Sciences Division of Los Alamos National Laboratory.

He studied in pioneering theoretical work the interaction of meteors and planetary atmospheres. He addressed in particular aerodynamics, ablation, meteor acoustics and infrasonic meteor observations. ReVelle died in 2010 due to complications of chemotherapy treatment for lymphoma.

An asteroid was named in his honor, 13358 Revelle, with the dedication: “Douglas O. ReVelle, of the Los Alamos National Laboratory, is well known for his pioneering theoretical work in meteor physics and astronomy based on theoretical aerodynamics, in meteor acoustics and in the interpretation of infrasonic meteor observations. The name was suggested by Z. Ceplecha.”
