= List of named minor planets: 4000–4999 =

This is a partial list of named minor planets in numerical order. It contains a total of 997 entries as of 20 March 2026. Minor planets for which no article exist are displayed in grey color and redirect to the list of minor planets (see List of minor planets § Main index).

== From 4,000 to 4,999 ==
- 4000 Hipparchus
- 4001 Ptolemaeus
- 4002 Shinagawa
- 4003 Schumann
- 4004 Listʹev
- 4005 Dyagilev
- 4006 Sandler
- 4007 Euryalos
- 4008 Corbin
- 4009 Drobyshevskij
- 4010 Nikolʹskij
- 4011 Bakharev
- 4012 Geballe
- 4013 Ogiria
- 4014 Heizman
- 4015 Wilson–Harrington
- 4016 Sambre
- 4017 Disneya
- 4018 Bratislava
- 4019 Klavetter
- 4020 Dominique
- 4021 Dancey
- 4022 Nonna
- 4023 Jarník
- 4024 Ronan
- 4025 Ridley
- 4026 Beet
- 4027 Mitton
- 4028 Pancratz
- 4029 Bridges
- 4030 Archenhold
- 4031 Mueller
- 4032 Chaplygin
- 4033 Yatsugatake
- 4034 Vishnu
- 4035 Thestor
- 4036 Whitehouse
- 4037 Ikeya
- 4038 Kristina
- 4039 Souseki
- 4040 Purcell
- 4041 Miyamotoyohko
- 4042 Okhotsk
- 4043 Perolof
- 4044 Erikhøg
- 4045 Lowengrub
- 4046 Swain
- 4047 Chang'E
- 4048 Samwestfall
- 4049 Noragalʹ
- 4050 Mebailey
- 4051 Hatanaka
- 4052 Crovisier
- 4053 Cherkasov
- 4054 Turnov
- 4055 Magellan
- 4056 Timwarner
- 4057 Demophon
- 4058 Cecilgreen
- 4059 Balder
- 4060 Deipylos
- 4061 Martelli
- 4062 Schiaparelli
- 4063 Euforbo
- 4064 Marjorie
- 4065 Meinel
- 4066 Haapavesi
- 4067 Mikhelʹson
- 4068 Menestheus
- 4069 Blakee
- 4070 Rozov
- 4071 Rostovdon
- 4072 Yayoi
- 4073 Ruianzhongxue
- 4074 Sharkov
- 4075 Sviridov
- 4076 Dörffel
- 4077 Asuka
- 4078 Polakis
- 4079 Britten
- 4080 Galinskij
- 4081 Tippett
- 4082 Swann
- 4083 Jody
- 4084 Hollis
- 4085 Weir
- 4086 Podalirius
- 4087 Pärt
- 4088 Baggesen
- 4089 Galbraith
- 4090 Říšehvězd
- 4091 Lowe
- 4092 Tyr
- 4093 Bennett
- 4094 Aoshima
- 4095 Ishizuchisan
- 4096 Kushiro
- 4097 Tsurugisan
- 4098 Thraen
- 4099 Wiggins
- 4100 Sumiko
- 4101 Ruikou
- 4102 Gergana
- 4103 Chahine
- 4104 Alu
- 4105 Tsia
- 4106 Nada
- 4107 Rufino
- 4108 Rakos
- 4109 Anokhin
- 4110 Keats
- 4111 Lamy
- 4112 Hrabal
- 4113 Rascana
- 4114 Jasnorzewska
- 4115 Peternorton
- 4116 Elachi
- 4117 Wilke
- 4118 Sveta
- 4119 Miles
- 4120 Denoyelle
- 4121 Carlin
- 4122 Ferrari
- 4123 Tarsila
- 4124 Herriot
- 4125 Lew Allen
- 4126 Mashu
- 4127 Kyogoku
- 4128 UKSTU
- 4129 Richelen
- 4130 Ramanujan
- 4131 Stasik
- 4132 Bartók
- 4133 Heureka
- 4134 Schütz
- 4135 Svetlanov
- 4136 Artmane
- 4137 Crabtree
- 4138 Kalchas
- 4139 Ulʹyanin
- 4140 Branham
- 4141 Nintanlena
- 4142 Dersu-Uzala
- 4143 Huziak
- 4144 Vladvasilʹev
- 4145 Maximova
- 4146 Rudolfinum
- 4147 Lennon
- 4148 McCartney
- 4149 Harrison
- 4150 Starr
- 4151 Alanhale
- 4152 Weber
- 4153 Roburnham
- 4154 Rumsey
- 4155 Watanabe
- 4156 Okadanoboru
- 4157 Izu
- 4158 Santini
- 4159 Freeman
- 4160 Sabrina-John
- 4161 Amasis
- 4162 SAF
- 4163 Saaremaa
- 4164 Shilov
- 4165 Didkovskij
- 4166 Pontryagin
- 4167 Riemann
- 4168 Millan
- 4169 Celsius
- 4170 Semmelweis
- 4171 Carrasco
- 4172 Rochefort
- 4173 Thicksten
- 4174 Pikulia
- 4175 Billbaum
- 4176 Sudek
- 4177 Kohman
- 4178 Mimeev
- 4179 Toutatis
- 4180 Anaxagoras
- 4181 Kivi
- 4182 Mount Locke
- 4183 Cuno
- 4184 Berdyayev
- 4185 Phystech
- 4186 Tamashima
- 4187 Shulnazaria
- 4188 Kitezh
- 4189 Sayany
- 4190 Kvasnica
- 4191 Assesse
- 4192 Breysacher
- 4193 Salanave
- 4194 Sweitzer
- 4195 Esambaev
- 4196 Shuya
- 4197 Morpheus
- 4198 Panthera
- 4199 Andreev
- 4200 Shizukagozen
- 4201 Orosz
- 4202 Minitti
- 4203 Brucato
- 4204 Barsig
- 4205 David Hughes
- 4206 Verulamium
- 4207 Chernova
- 4208 Kiselev
- 4209 Briggs
- 4210 Isobelthompson
- 4211 Rosniblett
- 4212 Sansyu-Asuke
- 4213 Njord
- 4214 Veralynn
- 4215 Kamo
- 4216 Neunkirchen
- 4217 Engelhardt
- 4218 Demottoni
- 4219 Nakamura
- 4220 Flood
- 4221 Picasso
- 4222 Nancita
- 4223 Shikoku
- 4224 Susa
- 4225 Hobart
- 4226 Damiaan
- 4227 Kaali
- 4228 Nemiro
- 4229 Plevitskaya
- 4230 van den Bergh
- 4231 Fireman
- 4232 Aparicio
- 4233 Palʹchikov
- 4234 Evtushenko
- 4235 Tatishchev
- 4236 Lidov
- 4237 Raushenbakh
- 4238 Audrey
- 4239 Goodman
- 4240 Grün
- 4241 Pappalardo
- 4242 Brecher
- 4243 Nankivell
- 4244 Zakharchenko
- 4245 Nairc
- 4246 Telemann
- 4247 Grahamsmith
- 4248 Ranald
- 4249 Křemže
- 4250 Perun
- 4251 Kavasch
- 4252 Godwin
- 4253 Märker
- 4254 Kamél
- 4255 Spacewatch
- 4256 Kagamigawa
- 4257 Ubasti
- 4258 Ryazanov
- 4259 McCoy
- 4260 Yanai
- 4261 Gekko
- 4262 DeVorkin
- 4263 Abashiri
- 4264 Karljosephine
- 4265 Kani
- 4266 Waltari
- 4267 Basner
- 4268 Grebenikov
- 4269 Bogado
- 4270 Juanvictoria
- 4271 Novosibirsk
- 4272 Entsuji
- 4273 Dunhuang
- 4274 Karamanov
- 4275 Bogustafson
- 4276 Clifford
- 4277 Holubov
- 4278 Harvey
- 4279 De Gasparis
- 4280 Simonenko
- 4281 Pounds
- 4282 Endate
- 4283 Stöffler
- 4284 Kaho
- 4285 Hulkower
- 4286 Rubtsov
- 4287 Třísov
- 4288 Tokyotech
- 4289 Biwako
- 4290 Heisei
- 4291 Kodaihasu
- 4292 Aoba
- 4293 Masumi
- 4294 Horatius
- 4295 Wisse
- 4296 van Woerkom
- 4297 Eichhorn
- 4298 Jorgenúnez
- 4299 WIYN
- 4300 Marg Edmondson
- 4301 Boyden
- 4302 Markeev
- 4303 Savitskij
- 4304 Geichenko
- 4305 Clapton
- 4306 Dunaevskij
- 4307 Cherepashchuk
- 4308 Magarach
- 4309 Marvin
- 4310 Strömholm
- 4311 Zguridi
- 4312 Knacke
- 4313 Bouchet
- 4314 Dervan
- 4315 Pronik
- 4316 Babinkova
- 4317 Garibaldi
- 4318 Baťa
- 4319 Jackierobinson
- 4320 Jarosewich
- 4321 Zero
- 4322 Billjackson
- 4323 Hortulus
- 4324 Bickel
- 4325 Guest
- 4326 McNally
- 4327 Ries
- 4328 Valina
- 4329 Miró
- 4330 Vivaldi
- 4331 Hubbard
- 4332 Milton
- 4333 Sinton
- 4334 Foo
- 4335 Verona
- 4336 Jasniewicz
- 4337 Arecibo
- 4338 Velez
- 4339 Almamater
- 4340 Dence
- 4341 Poseidon
- 4342 Freud
- 4343 Tetsuya
- 4344 Buxtehude
- 4345 Rachmaninoff
- 4346 Whitney
- 4347 Reger
- 4348 Poulydamas
- 4349 Tibúrcio
- 4350 Shibecha
- 4351 Nobuhisa
- 4352 Kyoto
- 4353 Onizaki
- 4354 Euclides
- 4355 Memphis
- 4356 Marathon
- 4357 Korinthos
- 4358 Lynn
- 4359 Berlage
- 4360 Xuyi
- 4361 Nezhdanova
- 4362 Carlisle
- 4363 Sergej
- 4364 Shkodrov
- 4365 Ivanova
- 4366 Venikagan
- 4367 Meech
- 4368 Pillmore
- 4369 Seifert
- 4370 Dickens
- 4371 Fyodorov
- 4372 Quincy
- 4373 Crespo
- 4374 Tadamori
- 4375 Kiyomori
- 4376 Shigemori
- 4377 Koremori
- 4378 Voigt
- 4379 Snelling
- 4380 Geyer
- 4381 Uenohara
- 4382 Stravinsky
- 4383 Suruga
- 4384 Henrybuhl
- 4385 Elsässer
- 4386 Lüst
- 4387 Tanaka
- 4388 Jürgenstock
- 4389 Durbin
- 4390 Madreteresa
- 4391 Balodis
- 4392 Agita
- 4393 Dawe
- 4394 Fritzheide
- 4395 Danbritt
- 4396 Gressmann
- 4397 Jalopez
- 4398 Chiara
- 4399 Ashizuri
- 4400 Bagryana
- 4401 Aditi
- 4402 Tsunemori
- 4403 Kuniharu
- 4404 Enirac
- 4405 Otava
- 4406 Mahler
- 4407 Taihaku
- 4408 Zlatá Koruna
- 4409 Kissling
- 4410 Kamuimintara
- 4411 Kochibunkyo
- 4412 Chephren
- 4413 Mycerinos
- 4414 Sesostris
- 4415 Echnaton
- 4416 Ramses
- 4417 Lecar
- 4418 Fredfranklin
- 4419 Allancook
- 4420 Alandreev
- 4421 Kayor
- 4422 Jarre
- 4423 Golden
- 4424 Arkhipova
- 4425 Bilk
- 4426 Roerich
- 4427 Burnashev
- 4428 Khotinok
- 4429 Chinmoy
- 4430 Govorukhin
- 4431 Holeungholee
- 4432 McGraw-Hill
- 4433 Goldstone
- 4434 Nikulin
- 4435 Holt
- 4436 Ortizmoreno
- 4437 Yaroshenko
- 4438 Sykes
- 4439 Muroto
- 4440 Tchantchès
- 4441 Toshie
- 4442 Garcia
- 4443 Paulet
- 4444 Escher
- 4445 Jimstratton
- 4446 Carolyn
- 4447 Kirov
- 4448 Phildavis
- 4449 Sobinov
- 4450 Pan
- 4451 Grieve
- 4452 Ullacharles
- 4453 Bornholm
- 4454 Kumiko
- 4455 Ruriko
- 4456 Mawson
- 4457 van Gogh
- 4458 Oizumi
- 4459 Nusamaibashi
- 4460 Bihoro
- 4461 Sayama
- 4462 Vaughan
- 4463 Marschwarzschild
- 4464 Vulcano
- 4465 Rodita
- 4466 Abai
- 4467 Kaidanovskij
- 4468 Pogrebetskij
- 4469 Utting
- 4470 Sergeev-Censkij
- 4471 Graculus
- 4472 Navashin
- 4473 Sears
- 4474 Proust
- 4475 Voitkevich
- 4476 Bernstein
- 4477 Kelley
- 4478 Blanco
- 4479 Charlieparker
- 4480 Nikitibotania
- 4481 Herbelin
- 4482 Frèrebasile
- 4483 Petöfi
- 4484 Sif
- 4485 Radonezhskij
- 4486 Mithra
- 4487 Pocahontas
- 4488 Tokitada
- 4489 Dracius
- 4490 Bambery
- 4491 Otaru
- 4492 Debussy
- 4493 Naitomitsu
- 4494 Marimo
- 4495 Dassanowsky
- 4496 Kamimachi
- 4497 Taguchi
- 4498 Shinkoyama
- 4499 Davidallen
- 4500 Pascal
- 4501 Eurypylos
- 4502 Elizabethann
- 4503 Cleobulus
- 4504 Jenkinson
- 4505 Okamura
- 4506 Hendrie
- 4507 Petercollins
- 4508 Takatsuki
- 4509 Gorbatskij
- 4510 Shawna
- 4511 Rembrandt
- 4512 Sinuhe
- 4513 Louvre
- 4514 Vilen
- 4515 Khrennikov
- 4516 Pugovkin
- 4517 Ralpharvey
- 4518 Raikin
- 4519 Voronezh
- 4520 Dovzhenko
- 4521 Akimov
- 4522 Britastra
- 4523 MIT
- 4524 Barklajdetolli
- 4525 Johnbauer
- 4526 Konko
- 4527 Schoenberg
- 4528 Berg
- 4529 Webern
- 4530 Smoluchowski
- 4531 Asaro
- 4532 Copland
- 4533 Orth
- 4534 Rimskij-Korsakov
- 4535 Adamcarolla
- 4536 Drewpinsky
- 4537 Valgrirasp
- 4538 Vishyanand
- 4539 Miyagino
- 4540 Oriani
- 4541 Mizuno
- 4542 Mossotti
- 4543 Phoinix
- 4544 Xanthus
- 4545 Primolevi
- 4546 Franck
- 4547 Massachusetts
- 4548 Wielen
- 4549 Burkhardt
- 4550 Royclarke
- 4551 Cochran
- 4552 Nabelek
- 4553 Doncampbell
- 4554 Fanynka
- 4555 Josefapérez
- 4556 Gumilyov
- 4557 Mika
- 4558 Janesick
- 4559 Strauss
- 4560 Klyuchevskij
- 4561 Lemeshev
- 4562 Poleungkuk
- 4563 Kahnia
- 4564 Clayton
- 4565 Grossman
- 4566 Chaokuangpiu
- 4567 Bečvář
- 4568 Menkaure
- 4569 Baerbel
- 4570 Runcorn
- 4571 Grumiaux
- 4572 Brage
- 4573 Piešťany
- 4574 Yoshinaka
- 4575 Broman
- 4576 Yanotoyohiko
- 4577 Chikako
- 4578 Kurashiki
- 4579 Puccini
- 4580 Child
- 4581 Asclepius
- 4582 Hank
- 4583 Lugo
- 4584 Akan
- 4585 Ainonai
- 4586 Gunvor
- 4587 Rees
- 4588 Wislicenus
- 4589 McDowell
- 4590 Dimashchegolev
- 4591 Bryantsev
- 4592 Alkissia
- 4593 Reipurth
- 4594 Dashkova
- 4595 Prinz
- 4597 Consolmagno
- 4598 Coradini
- 4599 Rowan
- 4600 Meadows
- 4601 Ludkewycz
- 4602 Heudier
- 4603 Bertaud
- 4604 Stekarstrom
- 4605 Nikitin
- 4606 Saheki
- 4607 Seilandfarm
- 4608 Wodehouse
- 4609 Pizarro
- 4610 Kájov
- 4611 Vulkaneifel
- 4612 Greenstein
- 4613 Mamoru
- 4614 Masamura
- 4615 Zinner
- 4616 Batalov
- 4617 Zadunaisky
- 4618 Shakhovskoj
- 4619 Polyakhova
- 4620 Bickley
- 4621 Tambov
- 4622 Solovjova
- 4623 Obraztsova
- 4624 Stefani
- 4625 Shchedrin
- 4626 Plisetskaya
- 4627 Pinomogavero
- 4628 Laplace
- 4629 Walford
- 4630 Chaonis
- 4631 Yabu
- 4632 Udagawa
- 4633 Marinbica
- 4634 Shibuya
- 4635 Rimbaud
- 4636 Chile
- 4637 Odorico
- 4638 Estens
- 4639 Minox
- 4640 Hara
- 4641 Ayako
- 4642 Murchie
- 4643 Cisneros
- 4644 Oumu
- 4645 Tentaikojo
- 4646 Kwee
- 4647 Syuji
- 4648 Tirion
- 4649 Sumoto
- 4650 Mori
- 4651 Wongkwancheng
- 4652 Iannini
- 4653 Tommaso
- 4654 Gorʹkavyj
- 4655 Marjoriika
- 4656 Huchra
- 4657 Lopez
- 4658 Gavrilov
- 4659 Roddenberry
- 4660 Nereus
- 4661 Yebes
- 4662 Runk
- 4663 Falta
- 4664 Hanner
- 4665 Muinonen
- 4666 Dietz
- 4667 Robbiesh
- 4668 Rayjay
- 4669 Høder
- 4670 Yoshinogawa
- 4671 Drtikol
- 4672 Takuboku
- 4673 Bortle
- 4674 Pauling
- 4675 Ohboke
- 4676 Uedaseiji
- 4677 Hiroshi
- 4678 Ninian
- 4679 Sybil
- 4680 Lohrmann
- 4681 Ermak
- 4682 Bykov
- 4683 Veratar
- 4684 Bendjoya
- 4685 Karetnikov
- 4686 Maisica
- 4687 Brunsandrej
- 4689 Donn
- 4690 Strasbourg
- 4691 Toyen
- 4692 SIMBAD
- 4693 Drummond
- 4694 Festou
- 4695 Mediolanum
- 4696 Arpigny
- 4697 Novara
- 4698 Jizera
- 4699 Sootan
- 4700 Carusi
- 4701 Milani
- 4702 Berounka
- 4703 Kagoshima
- 4704 Sheena
- 4705 Secchi
- 4706 Dennisreuter
- 4707 Khryses
- 4708 Polydoros
- 4709 Ennomos
- 4710 Wade
- 4711 Kathy
- 4712 Iwaizumi
- 4713 Steel
- 4714 Toyohiro
- 4715 Medesicaste
- 4716 Urey
- 4717 Kaneko
- 4718 Araki
- 4719 Burnaby
- 4720 Tottori
- 4721 Atahualpa
- 4722 Agelaos
- 4723 Wolfgangmattig
- 4724 Brocken
- 4725 Milone
- 4726 Federer
- 4727 Ravel
- 4728 Lyapidevskij
- 4729 Mikhailmilʹ
- 4730 Xingmingzhou
- 4731 Monicagrady
- 4732 Froeschlé
- 4733 ORO
- 4734 Rameau
- 4735 Gary
- 4736 Johnwood
- 4737 Kiladze
- 4738 Jimihendrix
- 4739 Tomahrens
- 4740 Veniamina
- 4741 Leskov
- 4742 Caliumi
- 4743 Kikuchi
- 4744 Rovereto
- 4745 Nancymarie
- 4746 Doi
- 4747 Jujo
- 4748 Tokiwagozen
- 4749 Ledzeppelin
- 4750 Mukai
- 4751 Alicemanning
- 4752 Myron
- 4753 Phidias
- 4754 Panthoos
- 4755 Nicky
- 4756 Asaramas
- 4757 Liselotte
- 4758 Hermitage
- 4759 Åretta
- 4760 Jia-xiang
- 4761 Urrutia
- 4762 Dobrynya
- 4763 Ride
- 4764 Joneberhart
- 4765 Wasserburg
- 4766 Malin
- 4767 Sutoku
- 4768 Hartley
- 4769 Castalia
- 4770 Lane
- 4771 Hayashi
- 4772 Frankdrake
- 4773 Hayakawa
- 4774 Hobetsu
- 4775 Hansen
- 4776 Luyi
- 4777 Aksenov
- 4778 Fuss
- 4779 Whitley
- 4780 Polina
- 4781 Sládkovič
- 4782 Gembloux
- 4783 Wasson
- 4784 Samcarin
- 4785 Petrov
- 4786 Tatianina
- 4787 Shulʹzhenko
- 4788 Simpson
- 4789 Sprattia
- 4790 Petrpravec
- 4791 Iphidamas
- 4792 Lykaon
- 4793 Slessor
- 4794 Bogard
- 4795 Kihara
- 4796 Lewis
- 4797 Ako
- 4798 Mercator
- 4799 Hirasawa
- 4800 Veveri
- 4801 Ohře
- 4802 Khatchaturian
- 4803 Birkle
- 4804 Pasteur
- 4805 Asteropaios
- 4806 Miho
- 4807 Noboru
- 4808 Ballaero
- 4809 Robertball
- 4810 Ruslanova
- 4811 Semashko
- 4812 Hakuhou
- 4813 Terebizh
- 4814 Casacci
- 4815 Anders
- 4816 Connelly
- 4817 Gliba
- 4818 Elgar
- 4819 Gifford
- 4820 Fay
- 4821 Bianucci
- 4822 Karge
- 4823 Libenice
- 4824 Stradonice
- 4825 Ventura
- 4826 Wilhelms
- 4827 Dares
- 4828 Misenus
- 4829 Sergestus
- 4830 Thomascooley
- 4831 Baldwin
- 4832 Palinurus
- 4833 Meges
- 4834 Thoas
- 4835 Asaeus
- 4836 Medon
- 4837 Bickerton
- 4838 Billmclaughlin
- 4839 Daisetsuzan
- 4840 Otaynang
- 4841 Manjiro
- 4842 Atsushi
- 4843 Mégantic
- 4844 Matsuyama
- 4845 Tsubetsu
- 4846 Tuthmosis
- 4847 Amenhotep
- 4848 Tutenchamun
- 4849 Ardenne
- 4850 Palestrina
- 4851 Vodopʹyanova
- 4852 Pamjones
- 4853 Marielukac
- 4854 Edscott
- 4855 Tenpyou
- 4856 Seaborg
- 4857 Altgamia
- 4858 Vorobjov
- 4859 Fraknoi
- 4860 Gubbio
- 4861 Nemirovskij
- 4862 Loke
- 4863 Yasutani
- 4864 Nimoy
- 4865 Sor
- 4866 Badillo
- 4867 Polites
- 4868 Knushevia
- 4869 Piotrovsky
- 4870 Shcherbanʹ
- 4871 Riverside
- 4872 Grieg
- 4873 Fukaya
- 4874 Burke
- 4875 Ingalls
- 4876 Strabo
- 4877 Humboldt
- 4878 Gilhutton
- 4879 Zykina
- 4880 Tovstonogov
- 4881 Robmackintosh
- 4882 Divari
- 4883 Korolirina
- 4884 Bragaria
- 4885 Grange
- 4886 Kojima
- 4887 Takihiroi
- 4888 Doreen
- 4889 Praetorius
- 4890 Shikanosima
- 4891 Blaga
- 4892 Chrispollas
- 4893 Seitter
- 4894 Ask
- 4895 Embla
- 4896 Tomoegozen
- 4897 Tomhamilton
- 4898 Nishiizumi
- 4899 Candace
- 4900 Maymelou
- 4901 Ó Briain
- 4902 Thessandrus
- 4903 Ichikawa
- 4904 Makio
- 4905 Hiromi
- 4906 Seneferu
- 4907 Zoser
- 4908 Ward
- 4909 Couteau
- 4910 Kawasato
- 4911 Rosenzweig
- 4912 Emilhaury
- 4913 Wangxuan
- 4914 Pardina
- 4915 Solzhenitsyn
- 4916 Brumberg
- 4917 Yurilvovia
- 4918 Rostropovich
- 4919 Vishnevskaya
- 4920 Gromov
- 4921 Volonté
- 4922 Leshin
- 4923 Clarke
- 4924 Hiltner
- 4925 Zhoushan
- 4926 Smoktunovskij
- 4927 O'Connell
- 4928 Vermeer
- 4929 Yamatai
- 4930 Rephiltim
- 4931 Tomsk
- 4932 Texstapa
- 4933 Tylerlinder
- 4934 Rhôneranger
- 4935 Maslachkova
- 4936 Butakov
- 4937 Lintott
- 4938 Papadopoulos
- 4939 Scovil
- 4940 Polenov
- 4941 Yahagi
- 4942 Munroe
- 4943 Lac d'Orient
- 4944 Kozlovskij
- 4945 Ikenozenni
- 4946 Askalaphus
- 4947 Ninkasi
- 4948 Hideonishimura
- 4949 Akasofu
- 4950 House
- 4951 Iwamoto
- 4952 Kibeshigemaro
- 4954 Eric
- 4955 Gold
- 4956 Noymer
- 4957 Brucemurray
- 4958 Wellnitz
- 4959 Niinoama
- 4960 Mayo
- 4961 Timherder
- 4962 Vecherka
- 4963 Kanroku
- 4964 Kourovka
- 4965 Takeda
- 4966 Edolsen
- 4967 Glia
- 4968 Suzamur
- 4969 Lawrence
- 4970 Druyan
- 4971 Hoshinohiroba
- 4972 Pachelbel
- 4973 Showa
- 4974 Elford
- 4975 Dohmoto
- 4976 Choukyongchol
- 4977 Rauthgundis
- 4978 Seitz
- 4979 Otawara
- 4980 Magomaev
- 4981 Sinyavskaya
- 4982 Bartini
- 4983 Schroeteria
- 4984 Patrickmiller
- 4985 Fitzsimmons
- 4986 Osipovia
- 4987 Flamsteed
- 4988 Chushuho
- 4989 Joegoldstein
- 4990 Trombka
- 4991 Hansuess
- 4992 Kálmán
- 4993 Cossard
- 4994 Kisala
- 4995 Griffin
- 4996 Veisberg
- 4997 Ksana
- 4998 Kabashima
- 4999 MPC
back to top

== See also ==
- List of minor planet discoverers
- List of observatory codes
- Meanings of minor planet names § Index
