= Shkodrov =

Shkodrov may refer to:

- 4364 Shkodrov
- Vladimir Shkodrov
