= Nikolai Chernykh =

Soviet and Ukrainian astronomer (1931–2004)

Minor planets discovered: 537
see § List of discovered minor planets

Nikolai Stepanovich Chernykh (Russian: Николай Степанович Черных, IPA: [nʲɪkɐˈlaj sʲtʲɪˈpanəvʲɪtɕ tɕɪrˈnɨx]; 6 October 1931 – 25 May 2004) was a Russian-born Soviet astronomer and discoverer of minor planets and comets at the Crimean Astrophysical Observatory in Nauchnyi, Crimea.

== Biography and work ==
Chernykh was born in the Russian city of Usman in Voronezh Oblast, in present-day Lipetsk Oblast. He specialized in astrometry and the dynamics of small bodies in the Solar System and worked at the Crimean Astrophysical Observatory from 1963.

Chernykh discovered two periodic comets 74P/Smirnova–Chernykh and 101P/Chernykh. He also discovered a very large number of asteroids, including notably 2867 Šteins and the Trojan asteroid 2207 Antenor. Chernykh worked with his wife and colleague Lyudmila Chernykh. The asteroid 2325 Chernykh discovered in 1979 by Czech astronomer Antonín Mrkos was named in their honour.

== List of discovered minor planets ==
List of minor planets discovered by Nikolai Chernykh

Name	Discovery Date	Listing
1796 Riga	16 May 1966	list
1836 Komarov	26 July 1971	list
1907 Rudneva	11 September 1972	list
1908 Pobeda	11 September 1972	list
2004 Lexell	22 September 1973	list
2006 Polonskaya	22 September 1973	list
2036 Sheragul	22 September 1973	list
2113 Ehrdni	11 September 1972	list
2123 Vltava	22 September 1973	list
2149 Schwambraniya	22 March 1977	list
2164 Lyalya	11 September 1972	list
2178 Kazakhstania	11 September 1972	list
2190 Coubertin	2 April 1976	list
2206 Gabrova	1 April 1976	list
2207 Antenor	19 August 1977	list
2208 Pushkin	22 August 1977	list
2222 Lermontov	19 September 1977	list
2228 Soyuz-Apollo	19 July 1977	list
2238 Steshenko	11 September 1972	list
2251 Tikhov	19 September 1977	list
2254 Requiem	19 August 1977	list
2269 Efremiana	2 May 1976	list
2286 Fesenkov	14 July 1977	list
2287 Kalmykia	22 August 1977	list
2293 Guernica	13 March 1977	list
2294 Andronikov	14 August 1977	list
2295 Matusovskij	19 August 1977	list
2297 Daghestan	1 September 1978	list
2312 Duboshin	1 April 1976	list
2323 Zverev	24 September 1976	list
2338 Bokhan	22 August 1977	list
2354 Lavrov	9 August 1978	list^{[A]}
2361 Gogol	1 April 1976	list
2362 Mark Twain	24 September 1976	list
2369 Chekhov	4 April 1976	list
2372 Proskurin	13 September 1977	list
2376 Martynov	22 August 1977	list
2377 Shcheglov	31 August 1978	list
2388 Gase	13 March 1977	list
2389 Dibaj	19 August 1977	list
2394 Nadeev	22 September 1973	list
2402 Satpaev	31 July 1979	list
2408 Astapovich	31 August 1978	list
2416 Sharonov	31 July 1979	list
2420 Čiurlionis	3 October 1975	list
2426 Simonov	26 May 1976	list
2427 Kobzar	20 December 1976	list
2428 Kamenyar	11 September 1977	list
2431 Skovoroda	8 August 1978	list
2439 Ulugbek	21 August 1977	list
2450 Ioannisiani	1 September 1978	list
2458 Veniakaverin	11 September 1977	list
2473 Heyerdahl	12 September 1977	list
2476 Andersen	2 May 1976	list
2477 Biryukov	14 August 1977	list
2492 Kutuzov	14 July 1977	list
2497 Kulikovskij	14 August 1977	list
2498 Tsesevich	23 August 1977	list
2506 Pirogov	26 August 1976	list
2508 Alupka	13 March 1977	list
2509 Chukotka	14 July 1977	list
2520 Novorossijsk	26 August 1976	list
2529 Rockwell Kent	21 August 1977	list
2553 Viljev	29 March 1979	list
2563 Boyarchuk	22 March 1977	list
2564 Kayala	19 August 1977	list
2566 Kirghizia	29 March 1979	list
2577 Litva	12 March 1975	list
2579 Spartacus	14 August 1977	list
2580 Smilevskia	18 August 1977	list
2584 Turkmenia	23 March 1979	list
2585 Irpedina	21 July 1979	list
2593 Buryatia	2 April 1976	list
2606 Odessa	1 April 1976	list
2607 Yakutia	14 July 1977	list
2609 Kiril-Metodi	9 August 1978	list^{[A]}
2610 Tuva	5 September 1978	list
2625 Jack London	2 May 1976	list
2626 Belnika	8 August 1978	list
2627 Churyumov	8 August 1978	list
2644 Victor Jara	22 September 1973	list
2646 Abetti	13 March 1977	list
2656 Evenkia	25 April 1979	list
2657 Bashkiria	23 September 1979	list
2668 Tataria	26 August 1976	list
2670 Chuvashia	14 August 1977	list
2671 Abkhazia	21 August 1977	list
2700 Baikonur	20 December 1976	list
2701 Cherson	1 September 1978	list
2703 Rodari	29 March 1979	list
2711 Aleksandrov	31 August 1978	list
2721 Vsekhsvyatskij	22 September 1973	list
2722 Abalakin	1 April 1976	list
2723 Gorshkov	31 August 1978	list
2724 Orlov	13 September 1978	list
2726 Kotelnikov	22 September 1979	list
2727 Paton	22 September 1979	list
2728 Yatskiv	22 September 1979	list
2734 Hašek	1 April 1976	list
2746 Hissao	22 September 1979	list
2758 Cordelia	1 September 1978	list
2769 Mendeleev	1 April 1976	list
2770 Tsvet	19 September 1977	list
2776 Baikal	25 September 1976	list
2777 Shukshin	24 September 1979	list
2783 Chernyshevskij	14 September 1974	list
2785 Sedov	31 August 1978	list
2786 Grinevia	6 September 1978	list
2787 Tovarishch	13 September 1978	list
2792 Ponomarev	13 March 1977	list
2793 Valdaj	19 August 1977	list
2794 Kulik	8 August 1978	list
2809 Vernadskij	31 August 1978	list
2810 Lev Tolstoj	13 September 1978	list
2832 Lada	6 March 1975	list
2833 Radishchev	9 August 1978	list^{[A]}
2836 Sobolev	22 December 1978	list
2849 Shklovskij	1 April 1976	list
2859 Paganini	5 September 1978	list
2862 Vavilov	15 May 1977	list
2867 Šteins	4 November 1969	list
2869 Nepryadva	7 September 1980	list
2883 Barabashov	13 September 1978	list
2887 Krinov	22 August 1977	list
2910 Yoshkar-Ola	11 October 1980	list
2915 Moskvina	22 August 1977	list
2916 Voronveliya	8 August 1978	list
2922 Dikan'ka	1 April 1976	list
2951 Perepadin	13 September 1977	list
2952 Lilliputia	22 September 1979	list
2953 Vysheslavia	24 September 1979	list
2966 Korsunia	13 March 1977	list
2967 Vladisvyat	19 September 1977	list
2968 Iliya	31 August 1978	list
2969 Mikula	5 September 1978	list
2983 Poltava	2 September 1981	list
2995 Taratuta	31 August 1978	list
3006 Livadia	24 September 1979	list
3009 Coventry	22 September 1973	list
3012 Minsk	27 August 1979	list
3013 Dobrovoleva	23 September 1979	list
3027 Shavarsh	8 August 1978	list
3038 Bernes	31 August 1978	list
3053 Dresden	18 August 1977	list
3054 Strugatskia	11 September 1977	list
3072 Vilnius	5 September 1978	list
3073 Kursk	24 September 1979	list
3084 Kondratyuk	19 August 1977	list
3094 Chukokkala	23 March 1979	list
3100 Zimmerman	13 March 1977	list
3112 Velimir	22 August 1977	list
3113 Chizhevskij	1 September 1978	list
3120 Dangrania	14 September 1979	list
3128 Obruchev	23 March 1979	list
3148 Grechko	24 September 1979	list
3158 Anga	24 September 1976	list
3170 Dzhanibekov	24 September 1979	list
3186 Manuilova	22 September 1973	list
3189 Penza	13 September 1978	list
3191 Svanetia	22 September 1979	list
3195 Fedchenko	8 August 1978	list
3196 Maklaj	1 September 1978	list
3204 Lindgren	1 September 1978	list
3213 Smolensk	14 July 1977	list
3224 Irkutsk	11 September 1977	list
3230 Vampilov	8 June 1972	list
3233 Krišbarons	9 September 1977	list
3234 Hergiani	31 August 1978	list
3238 Timresovia	8 November 1975	list
3242 Bakhchisaraj	22 September 1979	list
3246 Bidstrup	1 April 1976	list
3261 Tvardovskij	22 September 1979	list
3283 Skorina	27 August 1979	list
3298 Massandra	21 July 1979	list
3302 Schliemann	11 September 1977	list
3306 Byron	24 September 1979	list
3311 Podobed	26 August 1976	list
3323 Turgenev	22 September 1979	list
3348 Pokryshkin	6 March 1978	list
3349 Manas	23 March 1979	list
3358 Anikushin	1 September 1978	list
3359 Purcari	13 September 1978	list
3372 Bratijchuk	24 September 1976	list
3373 Koktebelia	31 August 1978	list
3385 Bronnina	24 September 1979	list
3399 Kobzon	22 September 1979	list
3408 Shalamov	18 August 1977	list
3409 Abramov	9 September 1977	list
3436 Ibadinov	24 September 1976	list
3444 Stepanian	7 September 1980	list
3448 Narbut	22 August 1977	list
3461 Mandelshtam	18 September 1977	list
3466 Ritina	6 March 1975	list
3470 Yaronika	6 March 1975	list
3471 Amelin	21 August 1977	list
3493 Stepanov	3 April 1976	list
3504 Kholshevnikov	3 September 1981	list
3517 Tatianicheva	24 September 1976	list
3518 Florena	18 August 1977	list
3535 Ditte	24 September 1979	list
3544 Borodino	7 September 1977	list
3557 Sokolsky	19 August 1977	list
3575 Anyuta	26 February 1984	list
3576 Galina	26 February 1984	list
3591 Vladimirskij	31 August 1978	list
3599 Basov	8 August 1978	list
3601 Velikhov	22 September 1979	list
3618 Kuprin	20 August 1979	list
3632 Grachevka	24 September 1976	list
3653 Klimishin	25 April 1979	list
3656 Hemingway	31 August 1978	list
3660 Lazarev	31 August 1978	list
3661 Dolmatovskij	16 October 1979	list
3710 Bogoslovskij	13 September 1978	list
3723 Voznesenskij	1 April 1976	list
3738 Ots	19 August 1977	list
3739 Rem	8 September 1977	list
3762 Amaravella	26 August 1976	list
3787 Aivazovskij	11 September 1977	list
3799 Novgorod	22 September 1979	list
3816 Chugainov	8 November 1975	list
3818 Gorlitsa	20 August 1979	list
3835 Korolenko	23 September 1977	list
3836 Lem	22 September 1979	list
3839 Bogaevskij	26 July 1971	list
3845 Neyachenko	22 September 1979	list
3856 Lutskij	26 August 1976	list
3883 Verbano	7 September 1972	list
3884 Alferov	13 March 1977	list
3885 Bogorodskij	25 April 1979	list
3886 Shcherbakovia	3 September 1981	list
3923 Radzievskij	24 September 1976	list
3942 Churivannia	11 September 1977	list
3945 Gerasimenko	14 August 1982	list
3965 Konopleva	8 November 1975	list
3966 Cherednichenko	24 September 1976	list
3986 Rozhkovskij	19 September 1985	list
4009 Drobyshevskij	13 March 1977	list
4010 Nikol'skij	21 August 1977	list
4011 Bakharev	28 September 1978	list
4013 Ogiria	21 July 1979	list
4014 Heizman	28 September 1979	list
4067 Mikhel'son	11 October 1966	list
4074 Sharkov	22 October 1981	list
4115 Peternorton	29 August 1982	list
4141 Nintanlena	8 August 1978	list
4165 Didkovskij	1 April 1976	list
4187 Shulnazaria	11 April 1978	list
4188 Kitezh	25 April 1979	list
4189 Sayany	22 September 1979	list
4233 Pal'chikov	11 September 1977	list
4234 Evtushenko	6 May 1978	list
4236 Lidov	23 March 1979	list
4237 Raushenbakh	24 September 1979	list
4271 Novosibirsk	3 April 1976	list
4274 Karamanov	6 September 1980	list
4280 Simonenko	13 August 1985	list
4306 Dunaevskij	24 September 1976	list
4308 Magarach	9 August 1978	list
4315 Pronik	24 September 1979	list
4316 Babinkova	14 October 1979	list
4389 Durbin	1 April 1976	list
4391 Balodis	21 August 1977	list
4392 Agita	13 September 1978	list
4428 Khotinok	18 September 1977	list
4429 Chinmoy	12 September 1978	list
4464 Vulcano	11 October 1966	list
4468 Pogrebetskij	24 September 1976	list
4470 Sergeev-Censkij	31 August 1978	list
4472 Navashin	15 October 1980	list

Name	Discovery Date	Listing
4480 Nikitibotania	24 August 1985	list
4515 Khrennikov	28 September 1973	list
4516 Pugovkin	28 September 1973	list
4518 Raikin	1 April 1976	list
4519 Voronezh	18 December 1976	list
4520 Dovzhenko	22 August 1977	list
4521 Akimov	29 March 1979	list
4534 Rimskij-Korsakov	6 August 1986	list
4561 Lemeshev	13 September 1978	list
4592 Alkissia	24 September 1979	list
4618 Shakhovskoj	12 September 1977	list
4619 Polyakhova	11 September 1977	list
4621 Tambov	27 August 1979	list
4653 Tommaso	1 April 1976	list
4654 Gor'kavyj	11 September 1977	list
4655 Marjoriika	1 September 1978	list
4657 Lopez	22 September 1979	list
4658 Gavrilov	24 September 1979	list
4683 Veratar	1 April 1976	list
4685 Karetnikov	27 September 1978	list
4686 Maisica	22 September 1979	list
4687 Brunsandrej	24 September 1979	list
4728 Lyapidevskij	11 November 1979	list
4737 Kiladze	24 August 1985	list
4777 Aksenov	24 September 1976	list
4780 Polina	25 April 1979	list
4786 Tatianina	13 August 1985	list
4813 Terebizh	11 September 1977	list
4814 Casacci	1 September 1978	list
4852 Pamjones	15 May 1977	list
4882 Divari	21 August 1977	list
4883 Korolirina	5 September 1978	list
4884 Bragaria	21 July 1979	list
4920 Gromov	8 August 1978	list
4935 Maslachkova	13 August 1985	list
4964 Kourovka	21 July 1979	list
4982 Bartini	14 August 1977	list
4983 Schroeteria	11 September 1977	list
4986 Osipovia	23 September 1979	list
5016 Migirenko	2 April 1976	list
5044 Shestaka	18 August 1977	list
5083 Irinara	13 March 1977	list
5084 Gnedin	26 March 1977	list
5085 Hippocrene	14 July 1977	list
5086 Demin	5 September 1978	list
5087 Emel'yanov	12 September 1978	list
5219 Zemka	2 April 1976	list
5220 Vika	23 September 1979	list
5222 Ioffe	11 October 1980	list
5245 Maslyakov	1 April 1976	list
5252 Vikrymov	13 August 1985	list
5269 Paustovskij	28 September 1978	list
5302 Romanoserra	18 December 1976	list
5303 Parijskij	3 October 1978	list
5314 Wilkickia	20 September 1982	list
5319 Petrovskaya	15 September 1985	list
5343 Ryzhov	23 September 1977	list
5344 Ryabov	1 September 1978	list
5360 Rozhdestvenskij	8 November 1975	list
5411 Liia	2 January 1973	list
5413 Smyslov	13 March 1977	list
5414 Sokolov	11 September 1977	list
5415 Lyanzuridi	3 October 1978	list
5455 Surkov	13 September 1978	list
5456 Merman	25 April 1979	list
5458 Aizman	10 October 1980	list
5543 Sharaf	3 October 1978	list
5570 Kirsan	4 April 1976	list
5614 Yakovlev	11 November 1979	list
5661 Hildebrand	14 August 1977	list
5707 Shevchenko	2 April 1976	list
5714 Krasinsky	14 August 1982	list
5794 Irmina	24 September 1976	list
5839 GOI	21 September 1974	list
5859 Ostozhenka	23 March 1979	list
5887 Yauza	24 September 1976	list
5889 Mickiewicz	31 March 1979	list
5931 Zhvanetskij	1 April 1976	list
5932 Prutkov	1 April 1976	list
5933 Kemurdzhian	26 August 1976	list
5935 Ostankino	13 March 1977	list
5936 Khadzhinov	29 March 1979	list
5988 Gorodnitskij	1 April 1976	list
5989 Sorin	26 August 1976	list
5990 Panticapaeon	9 March 1977	list
5991 Ivavladis	25 April 1979	list
6075 Zajtsev	1 April 1976	list
6164 Gerhardmüller	9 September 1977	list
6165 Frolova	8 August 1978	list
6167 Narmanskij	27 August 1979	list
6219 Demalia	8 August 1978	list
6232 Zubitskia	19 September 1985	list^{[A]}
6262 Javid	1 September 1978	list
6356 Tairov	26 August 1976	list
6357 Glushko	24 September 1976	list
6358 Chertok	13 January 1977	list
6359 Dubinin	13 January 1977	list
6467 Prilepina	14 October 1979	list
6536 Vysochinska	14 July 1977	list
6537 Adamovich	19 August 1979	list
6574 Gvishiani	26 August 1976	list
6575 Slavov	8 August 1978	list
6576 Kievtech	5 September 1978	list
6589 Jankovich	19 September 1985	list^{[A]}
6622 Matvienko	5 September 1978	list
6683 Karachentsov	1 April 1976	list
6684 Volodshevchenko	19 August 1977	list
6685 Boitsov	31 August 1978	list
6753 Fursenko	14 September 1974	list
6811 Kashcheev	26 August 1976	list
6845 Mansurova	2 May 1976	list
7002 Bronshten	26 July 1971	list
7003 Zoyamironova	25 September 1976	list
7008 Pavlov	23 August 1985	list
7046 Reshetnev	20 August 1977	list
7073 Rudbelia	11 September 1972	list
7074 Muckea	10 September 1977	list
7075 Sadovnichij	24 September 1979	list
7106 Kondakov	8 August 1978	list
7108 Nefedov	2 September 1981	list
7216 Ishkov	21 August 1977	list
7271 Doroguntsov	22 September 1979	list
7319 Katterfeld	24 September 1976	list
7322 Lavrentina	22 September 1979	list
7323 Robersomma	22 September 1979	list
7373 Stashis	27 August 1979	list
7385 Aktsynovia	22 October 1981	list
7394 Xanthomalitia	18 August 1985	list
7451 Verbitskaya	8 August 1978	list
7452 Izabelyuria	31 August 1978	list
7453 Slovtsov	5 September 1978	list
7509 Gamzatov	9 March 1977	list
7628 Evgenifedorov	19 August 1977	list
7629 Foros	19 August 1977	list
7725 Sel'vinskij	11 September 1972	list
7727 Chepurova	8 March 1975	list
7729 Golovanov	24 August 1977	list
7910 Aleksola	1 April 1976	list
7912 Lapovok	8 August 1978	list
7924 Simbirsk	6 August 1986	list^{[A]}
7976 Pinigin	21 August 1977	list
7980 Senkevich	3 October 1978	list
8062 Okhotsymskij	13 March 1977	list
8064 Lisitsa	1 September 1978	list
8065 Nakhodkin	31 March 1979	list
8141 Nikolaev	20 September 1982	list
8150 Kaluga	24 August 1985	list
8246 Kotov	20 August 1979	list
8248 Gurzuf	14 October 1979	list
8321 Akim	13 March 1977	list
8322 Kononovich	5 September 1978	list
8339 Kosovichia	15 September 1985	list
8446 Tazieff	28 September 1973	list
8449 Maslovets	13 March 1977	list
8450 Egorov	19 August 1977	list
8451 Gaidai	11 September 1977	list
8470 Dudinskaya	17 September 1982	list
8475 Vsevoivanov	13 August 1985	list
8609 Shuvalov	22 August 1977	list
8635 Yuriosipov	13 August 1985	list
8781 Yurka	1 April 1976	list
8783 Gopasyuk	13 March 1977	list
8785 Boltwood	5 September 1978	list
8805 Petrpetrov	22 October 1981	list
8806 Fetisov	22 October 1981	list
8983 Rayakazakova	13 March 1977	list
8984 Derevyanko	22 August 1977	list
8985 Tula	9 August 1978	list^{[A]}
9145 Shustov	1 April 1976	list
9148 Boriszaitsev	13 March 1977	list
9155 Verkhodanov	18 September 1982	list
9263 Khariton	24 September 1976	list
9535 Plitchenko	22 October 1981	list
9549 Akplatonov	19 September 1985	list^{[A]}
9717 Lyudvasilia	24 September 1976	list
9733 Valtikhonov	19 September 1985	list^{[A]}
9915 Potanin	8 September 1977	list
9916 Kibirev	3 October 1978	list
9932 Kopylov	23 August 1985	list
9933 Alekseev	19 September 1985	list^{[A]}
10005 Chernega	24 September 1976	list
10010 Rudruna	9 August 1978	list^{[A]}
10011 Avidzba	31 August 1978	list
10012 Tmutarakania	3 September 1978	list^{[B]}
10022 Zubov	22 September 1979	list
10263 Vadimsimona	24 September 1976	list
10264 Marov	8 August 1978	list
10269 Tusi	24 September 1979	list
10452 Zuev	25 September 1976	list
10456 Anechka	8 August 1978	list
10457 Suminov	31 August 1978	list
10481 Esipov	23 August 1982	list
10670 Seminozhenko	14 August 1977	list
10671 Mazurova	11 September 1977	list
10672 Kostyukova	31 August 1978	list
10681 Khture	14 October 1979	list
10718 Samus'	23 August 1985	list
10990 Okunev	28 September 1973	list
10991 Dulov	14 September 1974	list
11003 Andronov	14 October 1979	list
11011 KIAM	22 October 1981	list
11015 Romanenko	17 September 1982	list
11257 Rodionta	3 October 1978	list
11264 Claudiomaccone	16 October 1979	list
11444 Peshekhonov	31 August 1978	list
11785 Migaic	2 January 1973	list
11786 Bakhchivandji	19 August 1977	list
11787 Baumanka	19 August 1977	list
11788 Nauchnyj	21 August 1977	list
11790 Goode	1 September 1978	list
12185 Gasprinskij	24 September 1976	list
12187 Lenagoryunova	11 September 1977	list
12189 Dovgyj	5 September 1978	list
12670 Passargea	22 September 1979	list
12674 Rybalka	7 September 1980	list
12975 Efremov	28 September 1973	list
12976 Kalinenkov	26 August 1976	list
13005 Stankonyukhov	18 September 1982	list
13009 Voloshchuk	13 August 1985	list
13480 Potapov	9 August 1978	list^{[A]}
13482 Igorfedorov	25 April 1979	list
13906 Shunda	20 August 1977	list
13922 Kremenia	19 September 1985	list^{[A]}
14317 Antonov	8 August 1978	list
14322 Shakura	22 December 1978	list
14335 Alexosipov	3 September 1981	list
14346 Zhilyaev	23 August 1985	list
14794 Konetskiy	24 September 1976	list
15673 Chetaev	8 August 1978	list
15695 Fedorshpig	11 September 1985	list
16356 Univbalttech	1 April 1976	list
16358 Plesetsk	20 December 1976	list
16407 Oiunskij	19 September 1985	list^{[A]}
17354 Matrosov	13 March 1977	list
17356 Vityazev	9 August 1978	list
18301 Konyukhov	27 August 1979	list
19081 Mravinskij	22 September 1973	list
19082 Vikchernov	26 August 1976	list
19096 Leonfridman	14 October 1979	list
19915 Bochkarev	14 September 1974	list
19916 Donbass	26 August 1976	list
20963 Pisarenko	19 August 1977	list
22249 Dvorets Pionerov	11 September 1972	list
22254 Vladbarmin	3 October 1978	list
23406 Kozlov	23 August 1977	list
23409 Derzhavin	31 August 1978	list
23410 Vikuznetsov	31 August 1978	list
24605 Tsykalyuk	8 November 1975	list
24607 Sevnatu	14 August 1977	list
24608 Alexveselkov	18 September 1977	list
24647 Maksimachev	23 August 1985	list
24648 Evpatoria	19 September 1985	list^{[A]}
24649 Balaklava	19 September 1985	list^{[A]}
26075 Levitsvet	8 August 1978	list
26793 Bolshoi	13 January 1977	list
27658 Dmitrijbagalej	1 September 1978	list
29080 Astrocourier	1 September 1978	list
30722 Biblioran	6 September 1978	list
32734 Kryukov	1 September 1978	list
37530 Dancingangel	11 September 1977	list
37556 Svyaztie	28 August 1982	list^{[C]}
39509 Kardashev	22 October 1981	list
48410 Kolmogorov	23 August 1985	list
52231 Sitnik	5 September 1978	list
52263 Rustamov	24 August 1985	list
69259 Savostyanov	18 September 1982	list
73638 Likhanov	8 November 1975	list
Co-discovery made with:^{A} L. I. Chernykh^{B} L. G. Karachkina^{C} B. G. Marsden
