= 7385 Aktsynovia =

Main-belt asteroid

Discovery
- Discovered by: N. Chernykh
- Discovery site: Crimean Astrophysical Obs.
- Discovery date: 22 October 1981

Designations
- Named after: Lyudmila Aktsynova; Arkadij Aktsynov (Russian painters)
- Alternative designations: 1981 UQ_{11} · 1990 DP_{1}
- Minor planet category: main-belt · (inner) background

Orbital characteristics
- Epoch 4 September 2017 (JD 2458000.5)
- Uncertainty parameter 0
- Observation arc: 34.58 yr (12,632 days)
- Aphelion: 2.6909 AU
- Perihelion: 2.0873 AU
- Semi-major axis: 2.3891 AU
- Eccentricity: 0.1263
- Orbital period (sidereal): 3.69 yr (1,349 days)
- Mean anomaly: 222.56°
- Mean motion: 0° 16^{m} 0.84^{s} / day
- Inclination: 3.7338°
- Longitude of ascending node: 77.933°
- Argument of perihelion: 357.05°

Physical characteristics
- Dimensions: 3.98 km (calculated); 8.57±2.04 km 8.854±0.115 km
- Synodic rotation period: 4.1186±0.0008 h
- Geometric albedo: 0.057±0.011; 0.073±0.034; 0.20 (assumed)
- Spectral type: S
- Absolute magnitude (H): 14.0 · 14.02±0.56 · 13.80 · 13.918±0.002 (R) · 14.37

7385 Aktsynovia, provisional designation 1981 UQ_{11}, is a background asteroid from the inner regions of the asteroid belt, approximately between 4 and 9 kilometers in diameter, depending on its assumed spectral type. It was discovered on 22 October 1981, by Soviet–Russian astronomer Nikolai Chernykh at the Crimean Astrophysical Observatory in Nauchnyj on the Crimean peninsula.

== Orbit and classification ==
Aktsynovia is a non-family asteroid from the main belt's background population. It orbits the Sun in the inner asteroid belt at a distance of 2.1–2.7 AU once every 3 years and 8 months (1,349 days). Its orbit has an eccentricity of 0.13 and an inclination of 4° with respect to the ecliptic. No precovery was ever taken for this asteroid.

== Naming ==
This minor planet was named in memory of Russian artist couple Lyudmila and Arkadij Aktsynov (both 1910–1997), who were masters in landscape painting and portrait painting. Their landscape art depicted the regions of Siberia, Baikal, Sayany, Altaj and Volga. The official naming citation was published by the Minor Planet Center on 24 January 2000 (M.P.C. 38196).

== Physical characteristics ==
=== Diameter and albedo ===
According to the survey carried out by NASA's spaced-based Wide-field Infrared Survey Explorer and its subsequent NEOWISE mission, Aktsynovia measures 8.9 and 8.6 kilometers in diameter, respectively, with a corresponding albedo of 0.06 and 0.07. However, rather than classifying the body as a C-type asteroid, the Collaborative Asteroid Lightcurve Link assumes a standard albedo for stony asteroids of 0.20 and calculates a much smaller diameter of 4.0 kilometers with an absolute magnitude of 14.37.

=== Rotation period ===
A rotational lightcurve of Aktsynovia was obtained from photometric observations made at the U.S. Palomar Transient Factory in December 2011. The lightcurve gave a rotation period of 4.1186±0.0008 hours with a brightness amplitude of 0.32 in magnitude (U=2).
