= 3073 Kursk =

Main-belt asteroid binary

Discovery
- Discovered by: N. Chernykh
- Discovery site: Crimean Astrophysical Obs.
- Discovery date: 24 September 1979

Designations
- Named after: Kursk (Russian city)
- Alternative designations: 1979 SW_{11} · 1969 VG_{1}
- Minor planet category: main-belt · Flora

Orbital characteristics
- Epoch 4 September 2017 (JD 2458000.5)
- Uncertainty parameter 0
- Observation arc: 47.38 yr (17,305 days)
- Aphelion: 2.5475 AU
- Perihelion: 1.9375 AU
- Semi-major axis: 2.2425 AU
- Eccentricity: 0.1360
- Orbital period (sidereal): 3.36 yr (1,227 days)
- Mean anomaly: 64.484°
- Mean motion: 0° 17^{m} 36.6^{s} / day
- Inclination: 5.0362°
- Longitude of ascending node: 204.11°
- Argument of perihelion: 232.21°
- Known satellites: 1 (D: 1.67 km

Physical characteristics
- Dimensions: 4.67 km (derived)
- Synodic rotation period: 3.4468 h (0.14362 d)
- Geometric albedo: 0.24 (assumed)
- Spectral type: S
- Absolute magnitude (H): 13.6 · 13.86

3073 Kursk, provisionally known as 1979 SW_{11}, is a stony Florian asteroid and synchronous binary system from the inner regions of the asteroid belt, approximately 4.7 kilometers in diameter. It was discovered on 24 September 1979, by Soviet astronomer Nikolai Chernykh at the Crimean Astrophysical Observatory in Nauchnyj, on the Crimean peninsula.

== Orbit and characterization ==
Kursk is a member of the Flora family, one of the largest families of stony S-type asteroid in the main belt. It orbits the Sun in the inner main-belt at a distance of 1.9–2.5 AU once every 3 years and 4 months (1,227 days). Its orbit has an eccentricity of 0.14 and an inclination of 5° with respect to the ecliptic.

The Collaborative Asteroid Lightcurve Link assumes an albedo of 0.24 – derived from 8 Flora, a S-type asteroid and the family's largest member and namesake – and derives a diameter of 4.67 kilometers with an absolute magnitude of 13.86.

=== Satellite ===
A 1.67 kilometer-large minor-planet moon was discovered orbiting Kursk in 44.96 hours (or 1 day, 20 hours, and 57 minutes).

== Naming ==
This minor planet was named after the old Russian city Kursk. The approved naming citation was published by the Minor Planet Center on 2 July 1985 (M.P.C. 9771).
