= 6537 Adamovich =

Stony Florian asteroid

Discovery
- Discovered by: N. Chernykh
- Discovery site: Crimean Astrophysical Obs.
- Discovery date: 19 August 1979

Designations
- Named after: Aleksandr Adamovich (Byelorussian writer)
- Alternative designations: 1979 QK_{6} · 1985 JQ
- Minor planet category: main-belt · Flora

Orbital characteristics
- Epoch 4 September 2017 (JD 2458000.5)
- Uncertainty parameter 0
- Observation arc: 37.80 yr (13,805 days)
- Aphelion: 2.6055 AU
- Perihelion: 1.7518 AU
- Semi-major axis: 2.1786 AU
- Eccentricity: 0.1959
- Orbital period (sidereal): 3.22 yr (1,175 days)
- Mean anomaly: 306.60°
- Mean motion: 0° 18^{m} 23.4^{s} / day
- Inclination: 4.0254°
- Longitude of ascending node: 120.08°
- Argument of perihelion: 200.65°

Physical characteristics
- Dimensions: 3.22±0.50 km 4.253±0.227 km 4.50 km (calculated)
- Synodic rotation period: 2.4±0.1 h
- Geometric albedo: 0.170±0.029; 0.24 (assumed); 0.50±0.18
- Spectral type: S
- Absolute magnitude (H): 13.9 · 13.81±0.14 (R) · 13.12±1.33 · 14.4

6537 Adamovich, provisional designation 1979 QK_{6}, is a stony Florian asteroid from the inner regions of the asteroid belt, approximately 4 kilometers in diameter.

It was discovered on 19 August 1979, by Soviet–Russian astronomer Nikolai Chernykh at the Crimean Astrophysical Observatory, Nauchnyj, on the Crimean peninsula. The asteroid was later named after Byelorussian writer Aleksandr Adamovich.

== Orbit and classification ==
Adamovich is a S-type asteroid a member of the Flora family, one of the largest groups of stony asteroids in the main-belt. It orbits the Sun in the inner main-belt at a distance of 1.8–2.6 AU once every 3 years and 3 months (1,175 days). Its orbit has an eccentricity of 0.20 and an inclination of 4° with respect to the ecliptic.

== Physical characteristics ==
=== Lightcurve photometry ===
A fragmentary rotational lightcurve of Adamovich was obtained from photometric observation made at the Palomar Transient Factory in California in February 2013. It showed a provisional rotation period of 2.4±0.1 hours with a brightness amplitude of 0.13 magnitude (U=1).

=== Diameter and albedo ===
According to the surveys carried out by the NEOWISE mission of NASA's Wide-field Infrared Survey Explorer, Adamovich measures 3.22 and 4.3 kilometers in diameter and its surface has an albedo of 0.17 and 0.50, respectively. The Collaborative Asteroid Lightcurve Link (CALL) assumes an albedo of 0.24 – derived from 8 Flora, the largest member and namesake of its orbital family – and calculates a diameter of 4.5 kilometers with an absolute magnitude of 13.9.

== Naming ==
This minor planet was named in memory of Byelorussian–Russian Aleksandr Mikhajlovich Adamovich (1927–1994), publicist, literary scholar and talented writer, known for his civic responsibility. The official naming citation was published on 4 May 1999 (M.P.C. 34624).
