= 3204 Lindgren =

Main-belt asteroid

Discovery
- Discovered by: N. Chernykh
- Discovery site: Crimean Astrophysical Obs.
- Discovery date: 1 September 1978

Designations
- Named after: Astrid Lindgren (Swedish writer)
- Alternative designations: 1978 RH · 1980 CQ; 1980 DM
- Minor planet category: main-belt · (outer) background

Orbital characteristics
- Epoch 23 March 2018 (JD 2458200.5)
- Uncertainty parameter 0
- Observation arc: 39.06 yr (14,266 d)
- Aphelion: 4.0411 AU
- Perihelion: 2.2764 AU
- Semi-major axis: 3.1588 AU
- Eccentricity: 0.2793
- Orbital period (sidereal): 5.61 yr (2,051 d)
- Mean anomaly: 327.09°
- Mean motion: 0° 10^{m} 32.16^{s} / day
- Inclination: 2.0630°
- Longitude of ascending node: 108.70°
- Argument of perihelion: 298.30°

Physical characteristics
- Mean diameter: 18.95±0.80 km 19.596±0.248 km 20.2±2.0 km 20.21 km (calculated); 21±2 km
- Synodic rotation period: 5.614±0.0047 h 5.618±0.0047 h
- Geometric albedo: 0.05±0.01; 0.057 (assumed); 0.06±0.01; 0.0606±0.0151; 0.063±0.007; 0.065±0.006
- Spectral type: B (S3OS2); C (assumed)
- Absolute magnitude (H): 12.10; 12.170±0.001 (R); 12.20; 12.35±0.23; 12.582±0.001 (S)

3204 Lindgren, provisional designation 1978 RH, is a carbonaceous background asteroid from the outer regions of the asteroid belt, approximately 20 kilometers (12 miles) in diameter. It was discovered on 1 September 1978, by Soviet astronomer Nikolai Chernykh at the Crimean Astrophysical Observatory in Nauchnij, on the Crimean peninsula. The B-type asteroid has a rotation period of 5.6 hours. It was named after Swedish writer Astrid Lindgren.

== Orbit and classification ==
Lindgren is a non-family asteroid from the main belt's background population. It orbits the Sun in the outer asteroid belt at a distance of 2.3–4.0 AU once every 5 years and 7 months (2,051 days; semi-major axis of 3.16 AU). Its orbit has an eccentricity of 0.28 and an inclination of 2° with respect to the ecliptic. The body's observation arc begins with its official discovery observation at Nauchnij in 1978.

== Physical characteristics ==
Lindgren has been characterized as a "bright" carbonaceous B-type asteroid in both the Tholen-like and SMASS-like taxonomy of the Small Solar System Objects Spectroscopic Survey (S3OS2). It is also an assumed C-type asteroid.

=== Rotation period ===
In August 2012, two rotational lightcurves of Lindgren were obtained from photometric observations by astronomers at the Palomar Transient Factory in California. Lightcurve analysis gave a rotation period of 5.614 and 5.618 hours with a brightness amplitude of 0.15 magnitude in the S- and R-band, respectively (U=2/2).

=== Diameter and albedo ===
According to the surveys carried out by the Japanese Akari satellite and the NEOWISE mission of NASA's Wide-field Infrared Survey Explorer, Lindgren measures between 19 and 21 kilometers in diameter and its surface has an albedo between 0.05 and 0.065.

The Collaborative Asteroid Lightcurve Link assumes a standard albedo for a carbonaceous asteroid of 0.057 and calculates a diameter of 20.21 kilometers based on an absolute magnitude of 12.2.

== Naming ==
This minor planet was named after Swedish writer Astrid Lindgren (1907–2002), a recipient of the Hans Christian Andersen Award and known for her children's books such as Pippi Longstocking. The official naming citation was published by the Minor Planet Center on 2 April 1988 (M.P.C. 12971).
