= 2995 Taratuta =

Asteroid

Discovery
- Discovered by: N. Chernykh
- Discovery site: Crimean Astrophysical Obs.
- Discovery date: 31 August 1978

Designations
- Named after: Yevgeniya Taratuta (Soviet writer)
- Alternative designations: 1978 QK · 1951 JS; 1955 FD_{2} · 1955 FU; 1959 EE
- Minor planet category: main-belt · Eunomia

Orbital characteristics
- Epoch 4 September 2017 (JD 2458000.5)
- Uncertainty parameter 0
- Observation arc: 61.86 yr (22,593 days)
- Aphelion: 2.9702 AU
- Perihelion: 2.2624 AU
- Semi-major axis: 2.6163 AU
- Eccentricity: 0.1353
- Orbital period (sidereal): 4.23 yr (1,546 days)
- Mean anomaly: 309.94°
- Mean motion: 0° 13^{m} 58.44^{s} / day
- Inclination: 14.836°
- Longitude of ascending node: 169.77°
- Argument of perihelion: 329.51°

Physical characteristics
- Dimensions: 16.59 km 16.66 km (derived); 18.10±0.52 km
- Synodic rotation period: 6.6±0.1 h 11.14±0.02 h
- Geometric albedo: 0.060±0.004; 0.0704; 0.0920 (derived)
- Spectral type: S
- Absolute magnitude (H): 12.1 · 12.10±0.46 · 12.4

2995 Taratuta, provisional designation 1978 QK, is a stony Eunomian asteroid from the middle region of the asteroid belt, approximately 17 kilometers in diameter. It was discovered on 31 August 1978, by Russian astronomer Nikolai Chernykh at the Crimean Astrophysical Observatory, Nauchnyj, on the Crimean peninsula. The asteroid was later named after Soviet writer Yevgeniya Taratuta.

== Orbit and classification ==
2995 Taratuta is a member of the Eunomia family, a large group of S-type asteroids and the most prominent family in the intermediate main-belt. It orbits the Sun in the central main-belt at a distance of 2.3–3.0 AU once every 4 years and 3 months (1,546 days). Its orbit has an eccentricity of 0.14 and an inclination of 15° with respect to the ecliptic.

It was first identified as 1951 JS at McDonald Observatory in 1951. The asteroid's first used observation was a precovery taken at Mitaka Observatory (388) in 1955, extending the body's observation arc by 23 years prior to its official discovery observation at Nauchnyj.

== Physical characteristics ==
=== Rotation period ===
In March 2014, a rotational lightcurve was obtained from photometric observations at the U.S. Burleith Observatory in Washington D.C.. It gave a well-defined rotation period of 11.1 hours with a brightness variation of 0.25 magnitude (U=3-)

A previous fragmentary lightcurve obtained by French amateur astronomer Laurent Bernasconi in May 2006, gave a much shorter period of 6.6 hours with an amplitude of 0.06 (U=1).

=== Diameter and albedo ===
According to the survey carried out by the Infrared Astronomical Satellite IRAS and the Japanese Akari satellite, the asteroid measures 16.6 and 18.1 kilometers in diameter and its surface has an albedo of 0.06 and 0.07, respectively. The Collaborative Asteroid Lightcurve Link derives an albedo of 0.09 and a diameter of 16.7 kilometers with an absolute magnitude of 12.1

== Naming ==
This minor planet was named in honor of Yevgeniya Taratuta, Soviet writer and literary scholar. The official naming citation was published by the Minor Planet Center on 18 September 1986 (M.P.C. 11158).
