= 2228 Soyuz-Apollo =

Main-belt asteroid

2228 Soyuz–Apollo
Discovery
- Discovered by: N. Chernykh
- Discovery site: Crimean Astrophysical Obs.
- Discovery date: 19 July 1977

Designations
- Named after: Apollo–Soyuz (Test Project)
- Alternative designations: 1977 OH · 1933 SK_{1} 1952 DT_{1} · 1963 DD; 1973 YN_{3}
- Minor planet category: main-belt · Themis

Orbital characteristics
- Epoch 4 September 2017 (JD 2458000.5)
- Uncertainty parameter 0
- Observation arc: 53.75 yr (19,632 days)
- Aphelion: 3.7135 AU
- Perihelion: 2.5605 AU
- Semi-major axis: 3.1370 AU
- Eccentricity: 0.1838
- Orbital period (sidereal): 5.56 yr (2,029 days)
- Mean anomaly: 341.70°
- Mean motion: 0° 10^{m} 38.64^{s} / day
- Inclination: 1.9888°
- Longitude of ascending node: 140.40°
- Argument of perihelion: 285.71°

Physical characteristics
- Dimensions: 23.55 km (calculated); 26.080±0.295 km 28.26±0.49 km
- Synodic rotation period: 5.3846±0.0007 h 5.3868±0.0013 h 5.4±0.05 h 6.12 h
- Geometric albedo: 0.08 (assumed); 0.101±0.004; 0.113±0.020; 0.1134±0.0198
- Spectral type: C
- Absolute magnitude (H): 10.9 · 11.21±0.42 · 11.5 · 11.848±0.002 (S)

2228 Soyuz–Apollo, provisional designation 1977 OH, is a carbonaceous Themistian asteroid from the outer region of the asteroid belt, approximately 26 kilometers in diameter. It was discovered on 19 July 1977, by Soviet–Russian astronomer Nikolai Chernykh at the Crimean Astrophysical Observatory in Nauchnyj on the Crimean peninsula. It was named after the Apollo–Soyuz Test Project.

== Orbit and classification ==
The dark C-type asteroid is a member of the Themis family, a dynamical family of outer-belt asteroids with nearly coplanar ecliptical orbits. It orbits the Sun in the outer main-belt at a distance of 2.6–3.7 AU once every 5 years and 7 months (2,029 days). Its orbit has an eccentricity of 0.18 and an inclination of 2° with respect to the ecliptic.

== Physical characteristics ==
It has a rotation period of 5.4 hours and an albedo of 0.10 and 0.11, as determined by the space-based Akari and WISE missions, respectively, while the Collaborative Asteroid Lightcurve Link (CALL) assumes a lower albedo of 0.08.

== Naming ==
This minor planet was named after the joint Soviet-American space flight, the Apollo–Soyuz Test Project, carried on in 1975. The reversal of the names, "Soyuz–Apollo" rather than "Apollo–Soyuz", was not political, but to prevent confusion with the asteroid 1862 Apollo. The official naming citation was published by the Minor Planet Center on 1 March 1981 (M.P.C. 5850).
