= 2036 Sheragul =

Main-belt asteroid

Discovery
- Discovered by: N. Chernykh
- Discovery site: Crimea–Nauchnij
- Discovery date: 22 September 1973

Designations
- Named after: Sheragul (Siberian village)
- Alternative designations: 1973 SY_{2} · 1929 PN; 1929 PP · 1952 FJ_{1} 1956 RN · A915 HC
- Minor planet category: main-belt · Flora

Orbital characteristics
- Epoch 4 September 2017 (JD 2458000.5)
- Uncertainty parameter 0
- Observation arc: 87.14 yr (31,829 days)
- Aphelion: 2.6601 AU
- Perihelion: 1.8296 AU
- Semi-major axis: 2.2449 AU
- Eccentricity: 0.1850
- Orbital period (sidereal): 3.36 yr (1,229 days)
- Mean anomaly: 84.005°
- Mean motion: 0° 17^{m} 34.8^{s} / day
- Inclination: 3.9724°
- Longitude of ascending node: 346.26°
- Argument of perihelion: 306.35°

Physical characteristics
- Dimensions: 6.80±0.41 km 6.988±0.080 km 7.00±0.50 km 7.241±0.031 km 7.47 km (calculated)
- Synodic rotation period: 5.41±0.01 h 5.413±0.001 h 5.4203±0.0003 h 5.42026±0.00015 h 5.45±0.05 h
- Geometric albedo: 0.24 (assumed); 0.300±0.044; 0.318±0.036; 0.3383±0.0348
- Spectral type: A · S
- Absolute magnitude (H): 12.5 · 12.70 · 12.8 · 12.92±0.27

2036 Sheragul, provisional designation 1973 SY_{2}, is a rare-type Florian asteroid from the inner regions of the asteroid belt, approximately 7 kilometers in diameter. The asteroid was discovered on 22 September 1973, by Soviet astronomer Nikolai Chernykh at the Crimean Astrophysical Observatory in Nauchnij, on the Crimean peninsula. It was named after the Russian village of Sheragul in eastern Siberia.

== Orbit and classification ==
Sheragul is a member of the Flora family, one of the largest collisional populations of stony asteroids. It orbits the Sun in the inner main-belt at a distance of 1.8–2.7 AU once every 3 years and 4 months (1,229 days). Its orbit has an eccentricity of 0.19 and an inclination of 4° with respect to the ecliptic.

In April 1915, it was first identified as A915 HC at the Hamburg Observatory in Germany. The body's observation arc begins 44 years prior to its official discovery observations, with its identifications 1929 PN and 1929 PP at Johannesburg Observatory in August 1929.

== Physical characteristics ==
Sheragul has been characterized as a rare A-type asteroid by Pan-STARRS photometric survey.

=== Diameter and albedo ===
According to the surveys carried out by the Japanese Akari satellite and NASA's Wide-field Infrared Survey Explorer with its subsequent NEOWISE mission, Sheragul measures between 6.80 and 7.241 kilometers in diameter and its surface has an albedo between 0.300 and 0.3383.

The Collaborative Asteroid Lightcurve Link assumes an albedo of 0.24 – derived from 8 Flora, the largest member and namesake of its family – and subsequently calculates a larger diameter of 7.47 kilometers based on an absolute magnitude of 12.8.

=== Lightcurves and poles ===
Between 2003 and 2014, a large number of rotational lightcurve of Sheragul were obtained from photometric observations by astronomer Maurice Clark at Rosemary Hill Observatory in Florida, and Preston Gott Observatory in Texas, respectively. Lightcurve analysis gave a rotation period of 5.4130 hours with a brightness variation of 0.58 magnitude (U=3/3/3/3-/3-/3/3).

The asteroid was also observed during an international study of Florian asteroids by European astronomers in October 2007. It gave a concurring period of 5.45 hours with an exceptionally high amplitude of 1.5 magnitude, indicating the body has a non-spheroidal shape (U=3-).

Based on his many photometric observations, astronomer Maurice Clark also modeled the shape of Sheragul and obtained two spin axis with (306.0°, −35.8°) and (117.3°, −28.9°) in ecliptic coordinates (λ, β), respectively (U=3-;Q=1). His observations also suggest that the asteroid is in a retrograde rotation.

== Naming ==
This minor planet was named after the Russian village of Sheragul in Irkutsk Oblast, southeastern Siberia, approximately 400 kilometers northwest of Lake Baikal. The name also honors the people of this village, where Nikolai Chernykh spent his school years. The official naming citation was published by the Minor Planet Center on 1 September 1978 (M.P.C. 4482).
