= 1907 Rudneva =

Stony main-belt asteroid

Discovery
- Discovered by: N. Chernykh
- Discovery site: Crimean Astrophysical Obs.
- Discovery date: 11 September 1972

Designations
- Named after: Yevgeniya Rudneva (Soviet geodesist and war hero)
- Alternative designations: 1972 RC_{2} · 1935 QX; 1938 EY · 1938 FK; 1942 EH · 1942 EM_{1} 1950 EP · 1950 FB; 1950 HL · 1958 DD; 1958 FN · 1970 CP
- Minor planet category: main-belt · (middle) background

Orbital characteristics
- Epoch 4 September 2017 (JD 2458000.5)
- Uncertainty parameter 0
- Observation arc: 79.66 yr (29,094 days)
- Aphelion: 2.6541 AU
- Perihelion: 2.4386 AU
- Semi-major axis: 2.5464 AU
- Eccentricity: 0.0423
- Orbital period (sidereal): 4.06 yr (1,484 days)
- Mean anomaly: 181.05°
- Mean motion: 0° 14^{m} 33.36^{s} / day
- Inclination: 3.2198°
- Longitude of ascending node: 152.07°
- Argument of perihelion: 59.096°

Physical characteristics
- Dimensions: 10.977±0.108 km 10.98±0.43 km 11.32±2.95 km 11.83 km (calculated); 11.848±0.140 km
- Synodic rotation period: 44±3 h (poor)
- Geometric albedo: 0.18±0.13; 0.20 (assumed); 0.2009±0.0531; 0.232±0.025
- Spectral type: S (assumed)
- Absolute magnitude (H): 12.00 · 12.1 · 12.29 · 12.45±0.27

1907 Rudneva, provisional designation 1972 RC_{2}, is a stony background asteroid from the central regions of the asteroid belt, approximately 11 kilometers in diameter. It was discovered on 11 September 1972, by astronomer Nikolai Chernykh at the Crimean Astrophysical Observatory, Nauchnyj, on the Crimean peninsula. The asteroid was named after Soviet geodesist and war hero Yevgeniya Rudneva.

== Orbit and classification ==
Rudneva is a non-family asteroid from the main belt's background population. It orbits the Sun in the central asteroid belt at a distance of 2.4–2.7 AU once every 4 years and 1 month (1,484 days; semi-major axis of 2.55 AU). Its orbit has an eccentricity of 0.04 and an inclination of 3° with respect to the ecliptic.

The asteroid was first identified as 1935 QX at Johannesburg Observatory in August 1935. The body's observation arc begins with its identification as 1938 EY at Heidelberg Observatory in March 1938, almost 34 years prior to its official discovery observation at Nauchnyj.

== Physical characteristics ==
Rudneva is an assumed stony S-type asteroid.

=== Rotation period ===
In April 2003, a fragmentary rotational lightcurve of Rudneva was obtained from photometric observations by French amateur astronomer René Roy. Lightcurve analysis gave a rotation period of 44 hours with a brightness amplitude of at least 0.1 magnitude (U=1+). As of 2017, no secure period of Rudneva has been obtained.

=== Diameter and albedo ===
According to the survey carried out by the NEOWISE mission of NASA's Wide-field Infrared Survey Explorer, Rudneva measures between 10.977 and 11.848 kilometers in diameter and its surface has an albedo between 0.18 and 0.232.

The Collaborative Asteroid Lightcurve Link assumes a standard albedo for stony asteroids of 0.20 and calculates a diameter of 11.83 kilometers based on an absolute magnitude of 12.0.

== Naming ==
This minor planet was named after Ukrainian-born Yevgeniya Rudneva (1920–1944) a member of the Astronomical–Geodetical Society of the U.S.S.R., head of the solar department, and Hero of the Soviet Union. She voluntarily joined the army as a navigator in the all-female Night Bombers Aviation Regiment, known as the Night Witches. She died in April 1944, while flying her 645th combat mission. The official naming citation was published by the Minor Planet Center on 20 February 1976 (M.P.C. 3937).
