= 3710 Bogoslovskij =

Rare-type main-belt asteroid

Discovery
- Discovered by: N. Chernykh
- Discovery site: Crimean Astrophysical Obs.
- Discovery date: 13 September 1978

Designations
- Named after: Nikita Bogoslovskij (Russian composer)
- Alternative designations: 1978 RD_{6} · 1978 SK_{5} 1978 VG_{12} · 1982 NC; 1983 WG_{1}
- Minor planet category: main-belt · (middle)

Orbital characteristics
- Epoch 4 September 2017 (JD 2458000.5)
- Uncertainty parameter 0
- Observation arc: 38.63 yr (14,110 days)
- Aphelion: 3.1802 AU
- Perihelion: 2.3027 AU
- Semi-major axis: 2.7414 AU
- Eccentricity: 0.1601
- Orbital period (sidereal): 4.54 yr (1,658 days)
- Mean anomaly: 251.16°
- Mean motion: 0° 13^{m} 1.56^{s} / day
- Inclination: 13.804°
- Longitude of ascending node: 198.85°
- Argument of perihelion: 127.18°

Physical characteristics
- Dimensions: 11.625±0.196
- Geometric albedo: 0.131±0.024
- Spectral type: Cgh (SMASSII)
- Absolute magnitude (H): 12.6

3710 Bogoslovskij, provisionally known as 1978 RD_{6}, is a rare-type asteroid from the central region of the asteroid belt, approximately 11 kilometers in diameter.

It was discovered on 13 September 1978, by Soviet astronomer Nikolai Chernykh at the Crimean Astrophysical Observatory in Nauchnyj, on the Crimean peninsula, and named for Russian composer Nikita Bogoslovskij.

== Orbit and characterization ==
Bogoslovskij orbits the Sun in the central main-belt at a distance of 2.3–3.2 AU once every 4 years and 6 months (1,658 days). Its orbit has an eccentricity of 0.16 and an inclination of 14° with respect to the ecliptic.

In the SMASS classification, Bogoslovskij is an uncommon Cgh-type, which belongs to the broader class of carbonaceous asteroids. As of 2017, no rotational lightcurve has been obtained. The body's rotation period, poles and shape remain unknown.

== Naming ==
This minor planet was named in honor of Nikita Bogoslovskij (1913–2004), Russian writer and contemporary composer, on the occasion of his eightieth birthday. The approved naming citation was published by the Minor Planet Center on 1 September 1993 (M.P.C. 22499).
