= 3544 Borodino =

Asteroid

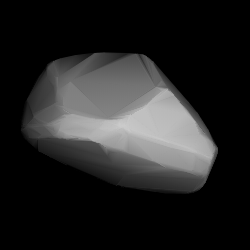
- Shape model of Borodino from its lightcurve

Discovery
- Discovered by: N. Chernykh
- Discovery site: Crimean Astrophysical Obs.
- Discovery date: 7 September 1977

Designations
- Named after: Borodino (village) (Battle of Borodino)
- Alternative designations: 1977 RD_{4} · 1936 QJ_{1} 1943 GM · 1947 LO; 1951 RW_{1} · 1951 SJ; 1980 FM_{11} · 1981 RN_{5}
- Minor planet category: main-belt · (inner) background

Orbital characteristics
- Epoch 23 March 2018 (JD 2458200.5)
- Uncertainty parameter 0
- Observation arc: 75.06 yr (27,414 d)
- Aphelion: 2.9302 AU
- Perihelion: 1.8718 AU
- Semi-major axis: 2.4010 AU
- Eccentricity: 0.2204
- Orbital period (sidereal): 3.72 yr (1,359 d)
- Mean anomaly: 344.02°
- Mean motion: 0° 15^{m} 53.64^{s} / day
- Inclination: 8.9017°
- Longitude of ascending node: 147.61°
- Argument of perihelion: 148.82°

Physical characteristics
- Mean diameter: 6.11±0.55 km 8.502±0.075 km 8.688±0.056 km
- Synodic rotation period: 5.435±0.00005 h 5.437±0.001 h 5.44±0.01 h 5.442±0.002 h (Note: David Higgins (2011): rotation period 5.442±0.002 hours with a brightness amplitude of 0.60±0.01 mag. Quality code is 3. Summary figures for (3544) Borodino at the LCDB and archived website of the Hunters Hill Observatory by David Higgins.)
- Pole ecliptic latitude: (294.0°, −60.0°) (λ_{1}/β_{1}); (157.0°, −57.0°) (λ_{2}/β_{2})
- Geometric albedo: 0.2361±0.0290; 0.247±0.027; 0.474±0.088
- Spectral type: S (assumed)
- Absolute magnitude (H): 12.4; 12.50

3544 Borodino (prov. designation: 1977 RD_{4}) is a stony background asteroid from the inner regions of the asteroid belt, approximately 9 kilometers (5.6 miles) in diameter. It was discovered on 7 September 1977, by Soviet astronomer Nikolai Chernykh at the Crimean Astrophysical Observatory in Nauchnij, on the Crimean peninsula. The likely elongated S-type asteroid has a rotation period of 5.44 hours. It was named for the Russian village of Borodino where the Battle of Borodino took place.

== Orbit and classification ==
Borodino is a non-family asteroid from the main belt's background population. It orbits the Sun in the inner asteroid belt at a distance of 1.9–2.9 AU once every 3 years and 9 months (1,359 days; semi-major axis of 2.4 AU). Its orbit has an eccentricity of 0.22 and an inclination of 9° with respect to the ecliptic. The asteroid was first observed as 1936 QJ_{1} at Johannesburg Observatory in August 1936. The body's observation arc begins with its observations as 1943 GM at Turku Observatory in April 1943, or more than 34 years prior to its official discovery observation at Nauchnij.

== Naming ==
This minor planet was named after the Russian village of Borodino near Moscow where the Battle of Borodino took place in September 1812 during the Napoleonic Wars. The official naming citation was published by the Minor Planet Center on 10 November 1992 (M.P.C. 21130).

== Physical characteristics ==
Borodino is an assumed stony S-type asteroid, which agrees with the albedo measured (see below) by the Wide-field Infrared Survey Explorer (WISE).

=== Rotation period ===
Several rotational lightcurves of Borodino have been obtained from photometric observations since 2007. Best-rated lightcurve by Australian amateur astronomer David Higgins at the Hunters Hill Observatory (E14) gave a rotation period of 5.442 hours with a brightness variation of 0.60 magnitude (U=3). Other observations by French amateur astronomer Patrick Mazel, by astronomers at Texas A&M University, using the SARA-telescopes of the Southeastern Association for Research and Astronomy consortium, and by astronomers at the Oakley Southern Sky Observatory, Australia, gave a period of 5.435, 5.437 and 5.44 hours with an amplitude of 0.74, 0.65 and 0.63 magnitude, respectively (U=n.a./3/2+). A high brightness amplitude is indicative of a non-spherical shape.

=== Poles ===
Two lightcurves, published in 2016, using modeled photometric data from the Lowell Photometric Database (LPD) and other sources, gave a concurring sidereal period of 5.43459±0.00001 and 5.43460±0.00005 hours, respectively. Each modeled lightcurve also determined two spin axes of (104.0°, −57.0°) and (267.0°, −53.0°), as well as (294.0°, −60.0°) and (157.0°, −57.0°) in ecliptic coordinates (λ, β), respectively.

=== Diameter and albedo ===
According to the surveys carried out by the Japanese Akari satellite and the NEOWISE mission of NASA's WISE telescope, Borodino measures between 6.11 and 8.688 kilometers in diameter and its surface has an albedo between 0.2361 and 0.474. The Collaborative Asteroid Lightcurve Link assumes an albedo of 0.20 and calculates a diameter of 9.84 kilometers based on an absolute magnitude of 12.4.
