= Edward Drobyshevski =

Russian astro- and plasma physicist (1936–2012)

Edward Mikhailovich Drobyshevski (Russian: Дробышевский, Эдуард Михайлович) (1936–2012), was a Russian astro- and plasma physicist.

== Career ==
E.M. Drobyshevski was born in 1936. In 1959 he graduated the Leningrad Polytechnical Institute as an engineer-researcher. He was a Candidate of Physico-Mathematical sciences in 1965 and Doctor of Physico-Mathematical sciences in 1982. His scientific research career has been connected with the Ioffe Physico-Technical Institute of the Russian Academy of Sciences where his posts have been senior laboratory assistant (1959), junior scientist (1960), senior scientist (1979), leading scientist (1986), laboratory head (1991–2004), and major scientist (1993–2012).

== Contributions ==
He has authored many theoretical and experimental studies on plasma physics, MHD, different branches of astrophysics (magnetic and binary stars, Solar System evolution, origin of asteroids and comets, astrobiology, dark matter, etc.), EM launch technology with industrial applications (for ~ 1 g projectiles, world record velocities achieved), and the like.

He has put forward several novel and at times provocative scientific paradigms. The areas studied include:

- (1) generation of magnetic fields in celestial bodies by MHD processes without positive feedback—"semi-dynamo";
- (2) close-binary Solar System cosmogony;
- (3) short-period comets and some other minor bodies as product of global explosions of electrolysed massive icy envelopes of distant moon-like bodies;
- (4) origin of life due to magneto-electrochemical processes in the Galilean satellites’ ensemble;
- (5) daemon paradigm considering the dark matter objects to be electrically charged (Ze ≈ 10e) elementary Planckian black holes (m ≈ 2×10^{−5} g, r_{g} ≈ 3×10^{−33} cm).

== Academic publications, membership of scientific societies and recognition ==
He has more than 250 scientific publications, including about 120 in peer-reviewed journals, plus 3 inventions. He was a member of the Hypervelocity Impact Society and the European Astronomical Society.

In 1992, the International Astronomical Union named the Themistian asteroid 4009 Drobyshevskij after him, in honour of his original cosmogonical ideas and theories of the origin of the planets and the minor bodies of the Solar System. It also noted that he was also known for his research on the magnetic fields of the sun and other stars.

== Coverage in the media ==
Some of his more controversial work has been noted in the popular press: His work on the Tunguska event has been noted in Popular Mechanics and Ria Novosti as well as in The British Interplanetary Society's publication Spaceflight. His work on Giant pieces of Jupiter's satellites as a threat to life on earth has been documented in Pravda.

== Publications ==
- ADS NASA
- ADS NASA
- SPIRES
- Arxiv
- Biblus
