= 14335 Alexosipov =

Main-belt asteroid

Discovery
- Discovered by: N. Chernykh
- Discovery site: Crimean Astrophysical Obs.
- Discovery date: 3 September 1981

Designations
- Named after: Alexandr Osipov (astronomer)
- Alternative designations: 1981 RR_{3} · 1971 SZ_{1} 1971 TE_{1}
- Minor planet category: main-belt · Flora

Orbital characteristics
- Epoch 4 September 2017 (JD 2458000.5)
- Uncertainty parameter 0
- Observation arc: 45.69 yr (16,689 days)
- Aphelion: 2.7038 AU
- Perihelion: 1.7656 AU
- Semi-major axis: 2.2347 AU
- Eccentricity: 0.2099
- Orbital period (sidereal): 3.34 yr (1,220 days)
- Mean anomaly: 283.07°
- Mean motion: 0° 17^{m} 42^{s} / day
- Inclination: 5.9013°
- Longitude of ascending node: 170.12°
- Argument of perihelion: 181.86°
- Earth MOID: 0.7595 AU

Physical characteristics
- Dimensions: 3.92 km (calculated); 4.176±0.101 km
- Synodic rotation period: 7.18±0.01 h (Note: Skiff (2011) web: rotation period 7.18±0.01 hours with a brightness amplitude of 0.10 mag. Summary figures for (14335) Alexosipov at Collaborative Asteroid Lightcurve Link (CALL))
- Geometric albedo: 0.24 (assumed); 0.279±0.032
- Spectral type: S
- Absolute magnitude (H): 14.2 · 14.20±0.46 · 13.9

14335 Alexosipov, provisional designation 1981 RR_{3}, is a stony Flora asteroid from the inner regions of the asteroid belt, approximately 4 kilometers in diameter. It was discovered by Soviet–Russian astronomer Nikolai Chernykh at the Crimean Astrophysical Observatory in Nauchnyj, on 3 September 1981. The asteroid was named after astronomer Alexandr Osipov.

== Orbit and classification ==
Alexosipov is a member of the Flora family, one of the largest groups of stony asteroids. It orbits the Sun in the inner main-belt at a distance of 1.8–2.7 AU once every 3 years and 4 months (1,220 days). Its orbit has an eccentricity of 0.21 and an inclination of 6° with respect to the ecliptic. The first astrometric observations were already made at the discovering observatory in 1971, 10 years prior to its discovery. However, these observations were not used to extend the asteroid's observation arc.

== Physical characteristics ==
Alexosipov has been characterized as a common S-type asteroid by Pan-STARRS photometric survey.

=== Rotation period ===
A rotational lightcurve of Alexosipov was obtained from photometric observations made by American astronomer Brian Skiff in October 2011. It gave a well-defined rotation period of 7.18±0.01 hours with a low brightness variation of 0.10 in magnitude (U=3). A low brightness amplitude typically indicates that the body has a nearly spheroidal shape.

=== Diameter and albedo ===
According to the survey carried out by the NEOWISE mission of NASA's space-based Wide-field Infrared Survey Explorer, Alexosipov measures 4.2 kilometers in diameter and its surface has an albedo of 0.279, while the Collaborative Asteroid Lightcurve Link assumes an albedo of 0.24 – which derives from 8 Flora, the largest member and namesake of this orbital family – and calculates a diameter of 3.9 kilometers with an absolute magnitude of 14.2.

== Naming ==
This minor planet was named in memory of astronomer Alexandr Kuzmich Osipov (1920–2004), observer of artificial satellites, the Moon, planets and comets at the Astronomical Observatory of the Kyiv National University in Ukraine. He is described as a skilled teacher for many generations of students. The approved naming citation was published by the Minor Planet Center on 15 December 2005 (M.P.C. 55721).
