= 2606 Odessa =

Main-belt asteroid

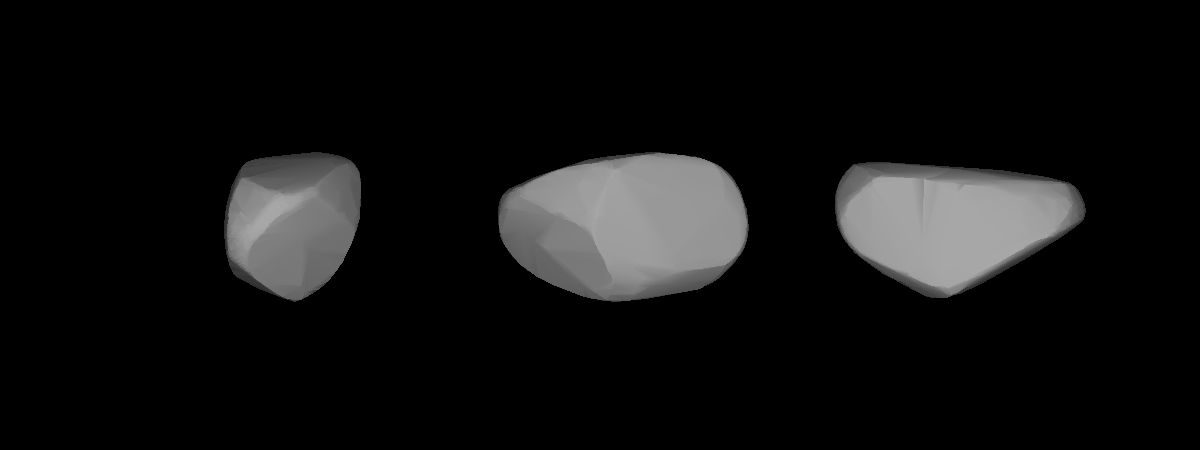
- Lightcurve-based 3D-model of Odessa

Discovery
- Discovered by: N. Chernykh
- Discovery site: Crimean Astrophysical Obs.
- Discovery date: 1 April 1976

Designations
- Named after: Odesa (city in Ukraine)
- Alternative designations: 1976 GX_{2} · 1955 VE
- Minor planet category: main-belt · (middle) background

Orbital characteristics
- Epoch 23 March 2018 (JD 2458200.5)
- Uncertainty parameter 0
- Observation arc: 62.91 yr (22,979 d)
- Aphelion: 3.4893 AU
- Perihelion: 2.0286 AU
- Semi-major axis: 2.7589 AU
- Eccentricity: 0.2647
- Orbital period (sidereal): 4.58 yr (1,674 d)
- Mean anomaly: 50.837°
- Mean motion: 0° 12^{m} 54.36^{s} / day
- Inclination: 12.452°
- Longitude of ascending node: 197.31°
- Argument of perihelion: 353.17°

Physical characteristics
- Mean diameter: 20+1 −5 km (pole solution 1); 17+2 −3 km (pole solution 2)
- Synodic rotation period: 8.2426±0.0003 h 8.244±0.002 h 8.2444 h
- Pole ecliptic longitude: 25° or 283°
- Pole ecliptic latitude: −81° or 88°
- Geometric albedo: 0.09+0.05 −0.02 (pole solution 1); 0.13+0.04 −0.04 (pole solution 2); 0.1753±0.0296
- Spectral type: SMASS = Xk; X · M
- Absolute magnitude (H): 11.5 · 11.57±0.21; 11.7

2606 Odessa, provisional designation 1976 GX_{2}, is a background asteroid from the central regions of the asteroid belt, approximately 16 kilometers (10 miles) in diameter. It was discovered on 1 April 1976, by Soviet–Russian astronomer Nikolai Chernykh at the Crimean Astrophysical Observatory in Nauchnij, on the Crimean peninsula. The presumably metallic X- or M-type asteroid has an elongated shape and a rotation period of 8.24 hours. It was named for the Ukrainian city of Odesa.

== Orbit and classification ==
Odessa is a non-family asteroid from the main belt's background population. It orbits the Sun in the intermediate asteroid belt at a distance of 2.0–3.5 AU once every 4 years and 7 months (1,674 days; semi-major axis of 2.76 AU). Its orbit has an eccentricity of 0.26 and an inclination of 12° with respect to the ecliptic.

The body's observation arc begins with a precovery taken at Palomar Observatory in July 1954, near 22 years prior to its official discovery observation at Nauchnij.

== Physical characteristics ==
In the SMASS classification, Odessa is a Xk-subtype that transitions between the X- and K-type asteroids. It has also been characterized as an X-type by Pan-STARRS photometric survey, while it as an M-type asteroid according to the Wide-field Infrared Survey Explorer (WISE).

=== Rotation period and poles ===
In 2008, two rotational lightcurves of Odessa were obtained from photometric observations at the Hunters Hill and Oakley Southern Sky observatories in Australia. Lightcurve analysis gave a well-defined rotation period of 8.2426 and 8.244 hours with a brightness amplitude of 0.80 and 0.72 magnitude, respectively, indicative for a non-spherical shape (U=3/3).

In 2016, a modeled lightcurve gave a concurring sidereal period of 8.2444 hours using data from the Uppsala Asteroid Photometric Catalogue, the Palomar Transient Factory survey, and individual observers (such as above), as well as sparse-in-time photometry from the NOFS, the Catalina Sky Survey, and the La Palma surveys (950). The study also determined two spin axes of (25.0°, −81.0°) and (283.0°, −88.0°) in ecliptic coordinates (λ, β).

=== Diameter and albedo ===
According to the survey carried out by the NEOWISE mission of NASA's WISE telescope, Odessa measures 15.91 kilometers in diameter and its surface has an albedo of 0.175, while the Collaborative Asteroid Lightcurve Link assumes a carbonaceous standard albedo of 0.057 and consequently calculates a larger diameter of 25.44 kilometers based on an absolute magnitude of 11.7.

== Naming ==
This minor planet was named after the Ukrainian black Sea port city of Odesa. The official naming citation was published by the Minor Planet Center on 1 December 1982 (M.P.C. 7472).
