= 4009 Drobyshevskij =

Asteroid Member of the Themis(24) Family

Discovery
- Discovered by: N. Chernykh
- Discovery site: Crimea–Nauchnij
- Discovery date: 13 March 1977

Designations
- Named after: Edward Drobyshevski (Russian astrophysicist)
- Alternative designations: 1977 EN_{1} · 1982 BP_{3} 1984 SP_{5}
- Minor planet category: main-belt · (outer); Themis

Orbital characteristics
- Epoch 23 March 2018 (JD 2458200.5)
- Uncertainty parameter 0
- Observation arc: 53.96 yr (19,708 d)
- Aphelion: 3.5557 AU
- Perihelion: 2.7232 AU
- Semi-major axis: 3.1394 AU
- Eccentricity: 0.1326
- Orbital period (sidereal): 5.56 yr (2,032 d)
- Mean anomaly: 92.040°
- Mean motion: 0° 10^{m} 37.92^{s} / day
- Inclination: 2.2916°
- Longitude of ascending node: 72.297°
- Argument of perihelion: 181.12°

Physical characteristics
- Mean diameter: 14.19 km (calculated); 16.31±1.16 km 18.198±0.236 km
- Synodic rotation period: 3.87±0.02 h 3.875±0.0060 h (S); 3.882±0.0060 h (R)
- Geometric albedo: 0.044±0.008; 0.071±0.011; 0.08 (assumed)
- Spectral type: C · C (assumed)
- Absolute magnitude (H): 12.4 · 12.50; 12.54±0.15 (R); 12.577±0.003 (R); 12.6 · 12.84

4009 Drobyshevskij, provisional designation 1977 EN_{1}, is a carbonaceous Themistian asteroid from the outer regions of the asteroid belt, approximately 16 kilometers (10 miles) in diameter. It was discovered on 13 March 1977, by Soviet–Russian astronomer Nikolai Chernykh at the Crimean Astrophysical Observatory in Nauchnij, on the Crimean peninsula, and named after Russian astrophysicist Edward Drobyshevski. The C-type asteroid has a relatively short rotation period of 3.875 hours.

== Orbit and classification ==
Drobyshevskij is a core member of the Themis family (602), a very large family of carbonaceous asteroids, named after 24 Themis, the family's parent body. It orbits the Sun in the outer main-belt at a distance of 2.7–3.6 AU once every 5 years and 7 months (2,032 days; semi-major axis of 3.14 AU). Its orbit has an eccentricity of 0.13 and an inclination of 2° with respect to the ecliptic.

The body's observation arc begins with a precovery taken at the Goethe Link Observatory in November 1963, more than 13 years prior to its official discovery observation at Crimea–Nauchnij.

== Physical characteristics ==
Drobyshevskij has been characterized as a C-type asteroid by Pan-STARRS photometric survey. CALL also assumes it to be a carbonaceous C-type, according to the Themistian asteroid's overall spectral type.

=== Rotation period ===
Three rotational lightcurves of Drobyshevskij were obtained from photometric observations by astronomers at the Palomar Transient Factory in California. Lightcurve analysis gave a rotation period between 3.87 and 3.882 hours with a brightness amplitude between 0.31 and 0.38 magnitude (U=2/2/2). The Collaborative Asteroid Lightcurve Link (CALL) adopts a period of 3.875 hours from observations made in the S-band as the best result. While not being a fast rotator, the body's period is relatively short.

=== Diameter and albedo ===
According to the surveys carried out by the Japanese Akari satellite and the NEOWISE mission of NASA's Wide-field Infrared Survey Explorer, Drobyshevskij measures between 16.31 and 18.198 kilometers in diameter and its surface has an albedo between 0.044 and 0.071. CALL assumes an albedo of 0.08 and calculates a diameter of 14.19 kilometers based on an absolute magnitude of 12.6.

== Naming ==
This minor planet was named after Edward Drobyshevski (1936–2012), who was a Russian astrophysicist at the Ioffe Institute of the Russian Academy of Sciences in Saint Petersburg, Russia. He is known for his cosmogonical models and theories about the origin of the small Solar System bodies as well as for his research on stellar magnetic fields. The official naming citation was published by the Minor Planet Center on 18 February 1992 (M.P.C. 19694).
