= 4440 Tchantchès =

Hungaria asteroid and a possible binary system

Discovery
- Discovered by: F. Dossin
- Discovery site: Haute-Provence Obs.
- Discovery date: 23 December 1984

Designations
- Named after: Tchantchès (Belgian folklore figure)
- Alternative designations: 1984 YV
- Minor planet category: main-belt · (inner); Hungaria

Orbital characteristics
- Epoch 4 September 2017 (JD 2458000.5)
- Uncertainty parameter 0
- Observation arc: 32.24 yr (11,775 days)
- Aphelion: 2.0694 AU
- Perihelion: 1.7731 AU
- Semi-major axis: 1.9212 AU
- Eccentricity: 0.0771
- Orbital period (sidereal): 2.66 yr (973 days)
- Mean anomaly: 60.453°
- Mean motion: 0° 22^{m} 12.36^{s} / day
- Inclination: 21.349°
- Longitude of ascending node: 283.33°
- Argument of perihelion: 225.01°
- Known satellites: 1 (possible)

Physical characteristics
- Dimensions: 2.093±0.586 km 4.42 km (calculated)
- Synodic rotation period: 2.783 h 2.788 h 2.7883 h 2.78836±0.00004 h 2.7884±0.0001 h 2.7886±0.0002 h 2.789±0.001 h 2.790±0.002 h (Note: Lightcurve plot of 4440 Tchantches by B. D. Warner at the Palmer Divide Observatory (2010): rotation period 2.790±0.001 hours with a brightness amplitude of 0.28±0.02 mag. Summary figures at Lightcurve Database (LCDB)); 6.83±0.1 h (wrong)
- Geometric albedo: 0.3 (assumed); 1.000±0.063
- Spectral type: E
- Absolute magnitude (H): 13.3 · 13.7 · 13.83±0.24 · 13.930±0.002 (R) · 14.0±0.2

4440 Tchantchès, provisional designation 1984 YV, is a rather elongated Hungaria asteroid and a possible binary system from the inner regions of the asteroid belt, approximately 3 kilometers in diameter.

It was discovered on 23 December 1984, by astronomer François Dossin at Haute-Provence Observatory in France and named after the Belgian folklore character Tchantchès. It is possibly orbited by a sub-kilometer sized minor-planet moon every 15 hours.

== Orbit and classification ==
Tchantchès is a member of the Hungaria family, a group which forms the innermost dense concentration of asteroids in the Solar System. It orbits the Sun at a distance of 1.8–2.1 AU once every 2 years and 8 months (973 days). Its orbit has an eccentricity of 0.08 and an inclination of 21° with respect to the ecliptic. The body's observation arc begins with its official discovery observation as no precoveries were taken, and no prior identifications were made.

== Physical characteristics ==
Tchantchès has been characterized as a bright E-type asteroid by the NEOWISE mission of NASA's Wide-field Infrared Survey Explorer.

=== Lightcurves ===
Between 2002 and 2014, numerous rotational lightcurves of Tchantchès had been obtained from photometric observations by American astronomer Brian Warner at his Palmer Divide Observatory in Colorado. Lightcurve analysis gave a well-defined rotation period of 2.7883 hours with a brightness amplitude between 0.21 and 0.34 magnitude (U=3/3/3-). Assuming an equatorial view on a simple triaxial ellipsoid, Warner estimates the body's shape to be elongated by 30% (a/b ratio of 1.3:1).

Other lightcurves with a concurring period were obtained by French amateur astronomer Bernard Christophe in October 2002, and at the Palomar Transient Factory in California in July 2010 (U=2/2).

=== Diameter and albedo ===
According to the survey carried out by NASA's NEOWISE mission, Tchantchès measures 2.093 kilometers in diameter and its surface has an outstandingly high albedo of 1.000, while the Collaborative Asteroid Lightcurve Link assumes an albedo of 0.30 – a compromise value between 0.4 and 0.2, corresponding to the Hungaria asteroids both as family and orbital group – and calculates a diameter of 4.42 kilometers with an absolute magnitude of 13.7.

== Binary system ==
In 2013, reviewing the photometric data obtained in October 2005, Brian Warner found evidence that Tchantchès is possibly an asynchronous binary asteroid. Attenuations seen in the revised lightcurve indicated mutual occultations and eclipses events caused by a minor-planet moon orbiting Tchantchès. The satellite has an orbital period of 15.35 hours (2014 publication), and diameter of at least 25% of that of its primary. The Johnston's archive derives a satellite diameter of 510 meters and estimates a semi-major axis of 3.8 kilometers for its orbit.

== Naming ==
This minor planet was named after the popular folklore character Tchantchès (Walloon for François) in the French-speaking part of Belgium, where the discoverer François Dossin lives. Tchantchès lived during Charlemagne's times in the early Middle Ages. The stubborn boy with a great heart is nowadays depicted as a folkloric marionette. The official naming citation was published by the Minor Planet Center on 8 December 1998 (M.P.C. 33385).
