= 4324 Bickel =

Main-belt asteroid

Discovery
- Discovered by: L. G. Taff
- Discovery site: Lincoln Laboratory ETS
- Discovery date: 24 December 1981

Designations
- Named after: Wolf Bickel (amateur astronomer)
- Alternative designations: 1981 YA_{1} · 1932 UD; 1932 WE · 1948 SD; 1948 TK_{2} · 1964 PE; 1966 DC · 1972 NF; 1973 YR_{3} · 1985 XX; A924 YC
- Minor planet category: main-belt · (middle)

Orbital characteristics
- Epoch 4 September 2017 (JD 2458000.5)
- Uncertainty parameter 0
- Observation arc: 92.44 yr (33,765 days)
- Aphelion: 3.0537 AU
- Perihelion: 2.0373 AU
- Semi-major axis: 2.5455 AU
- Eccentricity: 0.1996
- Orbital period (sidereal): 4.06 yr (1,483 days)
- Mean anomaly: 320.50°
- Mean motion: 0° 14^{m} 33.72^{s} / day
- Inclination: 7.7760°
- Longitude of ascending node: 292.79°
- Argument of perihelion: 108.71°

Physical characteristics
- Dimensions: 11.65±0.56 km 12.39 km (calculated)
- Synodic rotation period: 16 h 26.5 h 26.592±0.003 h
- Geometric albedo: 0.20 (assumed); 0.248±0.020
- Spectral type: S
- Absolute magnitude (H): 11.80 · 11.9 · 12.37±0.29

4324 Bickel, provisional designation 1981 YA_{1}, is a stony asteroid from the middle region of the asteroid belt, approximately 12 kilometers in diameter. It was discovered on 24 December 1981, by American astronomer Laurence Taff at Lincoln Laboratory's Experimental Test Site in Socorro, New Mexico, United States. The asteroid was named after amateur astronomer Wolf Bickel.

== Orbit and classification ==
Bickel orbits the Sun in the central main-belt at a distance of 2.0–3.1 AU once every 4 years and 1 month (1,483 days). Its orbit has an eccentricity of 0.20 and an inclination of 8° with respect to the ecliptic. It was first identified as A924 YC at Heidelberg Observatory in 1924, extending the body's observation arc by 57 years prior to its official discovery observation at Socorro.

== Physical characteristics ==
Bickel has been characterized as a common S-type asteroid.

=== Rotation period ===
In September 2001, the first ever conducted photometric observation of Bickel at the Rozhen Observatory, Bulgaria, rendered a rotational lightcurve with a longer-than-average period of 26.5 hours and a brightness variation of 0.63 magnitude (U=2). A more refined lightcurve was obtained in October 2005, by astronomers Raymond Poncy, Laurent Bernasconi and Rui Goncalves, which gave a well-defined period of 26.592±0.003 hours with an amplitude of 0.72 magnitude (U=3).

=== Diameter and albedo ===
According to observations by NASA's space-based Wide-field Infrared Survey Explorer with its subsequent NEOWISE mission, Bickel measures 11.7 kilometers in diameter and its surface has an albedo of 0.248, while the Collaborative Asteroid Lightcurve Link assumes a standard albedo for stony asteroids of 0.20 and calculates a slightly larger diameter of 12.4 kilometers with an absolute magnitude of 11.9.

== Naming ==
This minor planet was named in honor of German amateur astronomer Wolf Bickel (born 1942) who began observing minor planets at his private Bergisch Gladbach Observatory in 1995.

At the time this minor planet was named, he had discovered more than 540 numbered minor planets. The official naming citation was published by the Minor Planet Center on 22 July 2013 (M.P.C. 84378). Bickel has become Germany's most prolific discoverer of asteroids, ahead of (professional) astronomer Freimut Börngen, the first time in 150 years, that an amateur astronomer is ranking first among the German top discoverers. His total number of discoveries has since increased to more than 600.
