= 4786 Tatianina =

Asteroid

Xander Cruz
Discovery
- Discovered by: N. Chernykh
- Discovery site: Crimean Astrophysical Obs.
- Discovery date: 13 August 1985

Designations
- Named after: Tatiana Somova (Friend of discoverer)
- Alternative designations: 1985 PE_{2} · 1948 GA; 1970 KF · 1984 EV_{1} 1984 FM_{1}
- Minor planet category: main-belt · (inner) background

Orbital characteristics
- Epoch 23 March 2018 (JD 2458200.5)
- Uncertainty parameter 0
- Observation arc: 47.10 yr (17,202 d)
- Aphelion: 2.8145 AU
- Perihelion: 1.9011 AU
- Semi-major axis: 2.3578 AU
- Eccentricity: 0.1937
- Orbital period (sidereal): 3.62 yr (1,322 d)
- Mean anomaly: 83.900°
- Mean motion: 0° 16^{m} 19.92^{s} / day
- Inclination: 7.2560°
- Longitude of ascending node: 115.77°
- Argument of perihelion: 118.27°
- Known satellites: 1 (D: 0.61 km P: 21.67 h) (Note: (Pravec 2006) Lightcurve plots of (4786) Tatianina: Combined, Secondary and Primary. Rotation period in the R-band of 2.9227±0.0001 hours with a brightness amplitude of 0.19±0.02 mag. Quality code of 3. Binary detected. Summary figures at the LCDB and Pravec, P.; Wolf, M.; Sarounova, L. (2006). Plots from Ondrejov data obtained by the NEO Photometric Program and collaborating projects)

Physical characteristics
- Mean diameter: 3.282±0.197 km 3.475 km 3.48 km (taken)
- Synodic rotation period: 2.9227±0.0001 h 2.9227 h 2.9228±0.0003 h
- Geometric albedo: 0.4763; 0.5136±0.1593; 0.514±0.159
- Spectral type: SMASS = Xc · E
- Absolute magnitude (H): 13.3; 13.31±0.1 (R); 13.46±0.20; 13.718±0.1; 13.76

4786 Tatianina, provisional designation 1985 PE_{2}, is a bright background asteroid and synchronous binary system from the inner regions of the asteroid belt, approximately 3.4 kilometers (2.1 miles) in diameter. It was discovered on 13 August 1985, by Soviet astronomer Nikolai Chernykh at the Crimean Astrophysical Observatory in Nauchnij, on the Crimean peninsula. It was named after Tatiana Somova, a friend of the discoverer. The E-/Xc-subtype has a short rotation period of 2.9 hours. Its sub-kilometer minor-planet moon was discovered on 20 March 2006 and announced the following month.

== Orbit and classification ==
Tatianina is a non-family asteroid from the main belt's background population. It orbits the Sun in the inner asteroid belt at a distance of 1.9–2.8 AU once every 3 years and 7 months (1,322 days; semi-major axis of 2.36 AU). Its orbit has an eccentricity of 0.19 and an inclination of 7° with respect to the ecliptic.

The asteroid was first observed as 1948 GA at the Algiers Observatory in April 1948. The body's observation arc begins at Nauchnij in May 1970 as 1970 KF, more than 15 years prior to its official discovery observation.

== Physical characteristics ==
In the SMASS classification, Tatianina is a Xc-subtype that transitions from the X-type to the carbonaceous C-type asteroids. It has also been characterized as a bright E-type by the Wide-field Infrared Survey Explorer (WISE).

=== Rotation period ===
Several rotational lightcurves of Tatianina have been obtained from photometric observations since 2003 (U=3/2+/3). Analysis of the best-rated lightcurve from March 2003, during which a satellite was also discovered (see below), gave a rotation period of 2.9227 hours with a brightness amplitude of 0.19 and 0.20 magnitude (U=3/3).

=== Diameter and albedo ===
According to the survey carried out by the NEOWISE mission of NASA's WISE telescope, Tatianina measures between 3.282 and 3.475 kilometers in diameter and its surface has an exceptionally high albedo of 0.4763 to 0.514. The Collaborative Asteroid Lightcurve Link adopts the revised WISE-data by Petr Pravec, that is an albedo of 0.4763 and rounded diameter of 3.48 kilometers based on an absolute magnitude of 13.718.

=== Satellite ===
During the photometric observations by Donald Pray, Petr Pravec and collaborators in March 2006, it was revealed that Tatianina is a synchronous binary asteroid with a minor-planet moon orbiting it every 21.67 hours at an estimated average distance of 6.6 km. The discovery was announced on 11 April 2006. The mutual occultation events suggest the presence of a satellite with an estimated diameter of 610±10 meters or 19% the size of its primary.

== Numbering and naming ==
This minor planet was numbered on 28 April 1991. It was named by the discoverer after Tatiana Aleksandrovna Somova, a nursery-school teacher in Saint Petersburg, Russia. The official naming citation was published by the Minor Planet Center on 5 March 1996 (M.P.C. 26762).
