= 4362 Carlisle =

Main-belt asteroid

Discovery
- Discovered by: Perth Obs.
- Discovery site: Perth Obs.
- Discovery date: 1 August 1978

Designations
- Named after: Albert Carlisle (Australian meteorite hunter)
- Alternative designations: 1978 PR_{4} · 1974 FM_{1} 1984 EE_{1}
- Minor planet category: main-belt · Flora

Orbital characteristics
- Epoch 1 July 2021 (JD 2459396.5)
- Uncertainty parameter 0
- Observation arc: 68.88 yr (25,158 d)
- Aphelion: 2.4645 AU
- Perihelion: 2.0119 AU
- Semi-major axis: 2.2382 AU
- Eccentricity: 0.1011
- Orbital period (sidereal): 3.35 yr (1,223 d)
- Mean anomaly: 21.611°
- Mean motion: 0° 17^{m} 39.84^{s} / day
- Inclination: 4.7137°
- Longitude of ascending node: 34.379°
- Argument of perihelion: 171.93°
- Known satellites: 1 (>0.33 D_{s}/D_{p} P: 1.804 h)

Physical characteristics
- Mean diameter: <5.31 km (primary); >1.75 km (secondary); 5.20±0.23 km (combined); 5.590±0.174 km (combined)
- Synodic rotation period: 2.63289±0.00007 h
- Geometric albedo: 0.391±0.055; 0.412±0.064
- Spectral type: S (assumed)
- Absolute magnitude (H): 13.16

4362 Carlisle, provisional designation: 1978 PR_{4}, is a stony Flora asteroid and binary system from the inner regions of the asteroid belt. It was discovered on 1 August 1978, by staff members of the Perth Observatory at Bickley, Western Australia. The asteroid measures approximately 5 kilometers (3.1 miles) in diameter, has a short rotation period of 2.6 hours, and is likely spheroidal in shape. It was named in memory of Australian meteorite hunter Albert Carlisle (1917–1993). In June 2021, the discovery of a companion with an orbital period of 1.8 days and a diameter no less than a third of its primary, was announced.

== Orbit and classification ==
When applying the synthetic hierarchical clustering method (HCM) by Nesvorný, or the 1995 HCM-analysis by Zappalà, Carlisle is a member of the Flora family (402), a giant asteroid family and the largest family of stony asteroids in the main-belt. However, according to another HCM-analysis by Milani and Knežević (AstDys), it is a background asteroid as this analysis does not recognize the Flora asteroid clan.

Carlisle orbits the Sun in the inner main-belt at a distance of 2.0–2.5 AU once every 3 years and 4 months (1,223 days; semi-major axis of 2.24 AU). Its orbit has an eccentricity of 0.10 and an inclination of 5° with respect to the ecliptic. The first precovery was taken at Mount Wilson Observatory in 1952, extending the body's observation arc by 26 years prior to its official discovery at Bickley.

== Naming ==
This minor planet was named after meteorite hunter Albert Carlisle (1917–1993), who lived in the Australian Outback. During the course of half a century, he collected more than 9,000 of these rocky or metallic debris on the Nullarbor Plain of Western Australia and was awarded the Medal of the Order of Australia for his scientific contribution in 1982. The official naming citation was published by the Minor Planet Center on 29 November 1993 (M.P.C. 22829).

== Physical characteristics ==
Carlisle is an assumed stony S-type asteroid, which is the dominant spectral type for members of the Flora family.

=== Rotation period ===
Between March and June 2021, a rotational lightcurve of Carlisle was obtained from photometric observations by an international collaboration of astronomers. Lightcurve analysis gave a rotation period of 2.63289±0.00007 hours with a low brightness variation of 0.11 magnitude, suggesting a nearly spheroidal shape (U=n.a.).

The collaboration included the following astronomers and observatories: Vladimir Benishek at Belgrade Observatory (Serbia), Petr Pravec at Ondřejov Observatory (Czech Republic), Julian Oey at Blue Mountains Observatory (Australia), Alessandro Marchini and Riccardo Papini of the Astronomical Observatory University of Siena (Italy), Frederick Pilcher at Organ Mesa Observatory (USA-NM), Richard Durkee at Shed of Science South Observatory (USA-TX), Vasilij Chiorny at Chuguev station of the Kharkiv Observatory (Ukraine), R. Montaigut and Arnaud Leroy at OPERA Observatory (France), and M. Deldem at Les Barres Observatory (France).

=== Satellite ===
The international collaboration also observed mutual occultation and eclipsing events that had an amplitude of 0.11 in magnitude. This revealed the presence of a satellite at least a third the size of Carlisle, orbiting it once every 1.804±0.001 days (or 43.3 hours) at an estimated average distance of 17 kilometers.

=== Diameter and albedo ===
According to the surveys carried out by NASA's Wide-field Infrared Survey Explorer and its subsequent NEOWISE mission, Carlisle measures 5.20±0.23 and 5.590±0.174 kilometers in diameter, based on a very high albedo of 0.412±0.064 and 0.391±0.055, respectively. The Collaborative Asteroid Lightcurve Link assumes an albedo of 0.24 – taken from the Flora family's largest member and namesake, the asteroid 8 Flora – and calculates a larger diameter of 6.5 kilometers.

Photometric observations by an international collaboration that discovered a satellite in 2021, gave a secondary-to-primary diameter ratio (D_{s}/D_{p}) of at least 0.33. This means, that the moon's size is at least 33% of that of Carlisle's (the primary body). Based on the NEOWISE observations which gave an effective diameter of 5.59 km (3.5 mi), a lower diameter-limit for the moon of 1.75 km (1.1 mi) and an upper diameter-limit for Carlisle of 5.31 km (3.3 mi) can be calculated.
