= 4486 Mithra =

Eccentric asteroid and suspected contact-binary

Discovery
- Discovered by: E. W. Elst; V. G. Shkodrov
- Discovery site: Rozhen Obs. – Smolyan
- Discovery date: 22 September 1987

Designations
- Pronunciation: /ˈmɪθrə/
- Named after: Mithra (proto-Indo-Iranian religion)
- Alternative designations: 1987 SB; 1974 DN_{1}
- Minor planet category: NEO; Apollo; PHA

Orbital characteristics
- Epoch 4 September 2017 (JD 2458000.5)
- Uncertainty parameter 0
- Observation arc: 29.04 yr (10,607 days)
- Aphelion: 3.6582 AU
- Perihelion: 0.7417 AU
- Semi-major axis: 2.2000 AU
- Eccentricity: 0.6629
- Orbital period (sidereal): 3.26 yr (1,192 days)
- Mean anomaly: 91.928°
- Mean motion: 0° 18^{m} 7.2^{s} / day
- Inclination: 3.0395°
- Longitude of ascending node: 82.240°
- Time of perihelion: 2023-May-15
- Argument of perihelion: 168.87°
- Earth MOID: 0.0463 AU (18 LD)

Physical characteristics
- Mean diameter: 1.849±0.022 km; 2.25 km (calculated)
- Synodic rotation period: 67.5±6 h; 100 h
- Geometric albedo: 0.20 (assumed); 0.297±0.056
- Spectral type: S
- Absolute magnitude (H): 15.6; 15.68±0.31

4486 Mithra (prov. designation: 1987 SB), is an eccentric asteroid and suspected contact-binary, classified as a near-Earth object and potentially hazardous asteroid, approximately 2 kilometers in diameter. It belongs to the Apollo group of asteroids and is a relatively slow rotator.

The asteroid was discovered on 22 September 1987, by Belgian astronomer Eric Elst and Bulgarian astronomer Vladimir Shkodrov at Rozhen Observatory, in the Smolyan Province of Bulgaria. It was named after the Indo-Iranian divinity Mithra.

== Orbit and classification ==
Mithra orbits the Sun at a distance of 0.7–3.7 AU once every 3 years and 3 months (1,192 days). Its orbit has an eccentricity of 0.66 and an inclination of 3° with respect to the ecliptic. In 1974, Mithra was first identified as 1974 DN_{1} at Crimea–Nauchnij. The body's observation arc begins 8 months prior to its official discovery observation, with a precovery taken at the Japanese Kiso Observatory in January 1987.

=== Close approaches ===
As a potentially hazardous asteroid, it has a low minimum orbit intersection distance with Earth of 0.0462 AU (6,910,000 km; 18.0 LD). On 14 August 2000, it passed 0.0465 AU (6,960,000 km; 18.1 LD) from Earth.

Earth Approach on 11 April 2023
Date	JPL Horizons nominal geocentric distance (AU)	uncertainty region (3-sigma)
2023-Apr-11 16:49	0.16267 AU (24.335 million km)	±47 km

Venus Approach on 4 November 2150
Date	JPL Horizons nominal geocentric distance (AU)	uncertainty region (3-sigma)
2150-Nov-04 17:06 ± 00:18	0.01382 AU (2.067 million km)	±700 km

== Physical characteristics ==
=== Rotation period and shape ===
Radar imaging using a delay-Doppler technique at the Arecibo and Goldstone observatories rendered a rotation period of 67.5±6 hours. Based on the radar analysis, Mithra is also a strong candidate for a contact binary, which is composed of two distinct lobes in mutual contact, held together by their weak gravitational attraction. They typically show a bifurcated, dumbbell-like shape (also see 4769 Castalia). A large number of near-Earth objects are believed to be contact-binaries.

=== Diameter and albedo ===
According to the survey carried out by the NEOWISE mission of NASA's Wide-field Infrared Survey Explorer, Mithra measures 1.85 kilometers in diameter and its surface has a high albedo of 0.297, while the Collaborative Asteroid Lightcurve Link assumes a standard albedo for stony asteroids of 0.20 and calculates a diameter of 2.25 kilometer with an absolute magnitude of 15.6.

== Naming ==
This minor planet was named after Mithra (also see Mitra), deity in the proto-Indo-Iranian religion. The mystery religion of Mithraism was practiced in the Roman Empire between the 1st and 4th century. Considered to be a rival of early Christianity, both religions shared similar characteristics such as elevation and the ritual of baptism. In the Hellenistic world, Mithra was conflated with Apollo. The asteroid 1862 Apollo is the namesake of this asteroid's orbital group. The approved naming citation was published by the Minor Planet Center on 5 September 1990 (M.P.C. 16885).
