= 4391 Balodis =

Main-belt asteroid

Discovery
- Discovered by: N. Chernykh
- Discovery site: Crimean Astrophysical Obs.
- Discovery date: 21 August 1977

Designations
- Named after: Jānis Balodis (Latvian cosmic geodesist)
- Alternative designations: 1977 QW_{2} · 1977 RR_{2} 1980 GZ
- Minor planet category: main-belt · Erigone

Orbital characteristics
- Epoch 4 September 2017 (JD 2458000.5)
- Uncertainty parameter 0
- Observation arc: 39.70 yr (14,499 days)
- Aphelion: 2.8989 AU
- Perihelion: 1.8794 AU
- Semi-major axis: 2.3892 AU
- Eccentricity: 0.2134
- Orbital period (sidereal): 3.69 yr (1,349 days)
- Mean anomaly: 330.57°
- Mean motion: 0° 16^{m} 0.84^{s} / day
- Inclination: 5.3519°
- Longitude of ascending node: 190.30°
- Argument of perihelion: 108.27°

Physical characteristics
- Dimensions: 3.36±0.17 km 8.05 km (calculated)
- Synodic rotation period: 3.448±0.001 h
- Geometric albedo: 0.057 (assumed); 0.393±0.072
- Spectral type: C
- Absolute magnitude (H): 14.2 · 14.00 · 14.37±0.36

4391 Balodis, provisional designation 1977 QW_{2}, is a dark and rare Erigone asteroid from the inner regions of the asteroid belt, approximately 8 kilometers in diameter. It was discovered by Soviet–Russian astronomer Nikolai Chernykh at the Crimean Astrophysical Observatory in Nauchnyj, on the Crimean peninsula, on 21 August 1977. The asteroid was named for Latvian geodesist Jānis Balodis.

== Orbit and classification ==
Balodis orbits the Sun in the inner main-belt at a distance of 1.9–2.9 AU every 3 years and 8 months (1,349 days). Its orbit has an eccentricity of 0.21 and an inclination of 5° with respect to the ecliptic. Based on its orbital elements, the Collaborative Asteroid Lightcurve Link (CALL) classifies the asteroid as a member of the Erigone family, which is named after its largest member and namesake, 163 Erigone, also a dark body of carbonaceous composition.

== Physical characteristics ==
=== Diameter and albedo ===
According to observations by NASA's space-based Wide-field Infrared Survey Explorer with its subsequent NEOWISE mission, Balodis measures 3.4 kilometers in diameter, and its surface has an exceptionally high albedo of 0.40. However, the CALL assumes a standard albedo for a C-type asteroid of 0.057 and calculates a diameter of 8.4 kilometers with an absolute magnitude of 14.2, as the lower the albedo (reflectivity) the larger the body's diameter.

=== Rotation period ===
In July 2010, a rotational lightcurve of Balodis was obtained by Italian astronomer Albino Carbognani from photometric observations taken at the Astronomical Observatory of the Autonomous Region of the Aosta Valley (OAVdA) in Italy. It showed a rotation period of 3.448±0.001 hours, with a brightness amplitude of 0.29 in magnitude (U=2).

== Naming ==
This minor planet was named after Latvian cosmic geodesist Jānis Balodis, head of the Astronomical Observatory at University of Latvia.

Balodis' research includes astrometry, observations of artificial satellites using laser, as well as computational methods for astrometric interpretations of photographic plates. The Crimean minor planet service has used his algorithms for a long time. (The honored astronomer should not be confused with Soviet army General Jānis Balodis.) The official naming citation was published by the Minor Planet Center on 12 September 1992 (M.P.C. 20837).
