= Vladimir Shkodrov =

Bulgarian astronomer

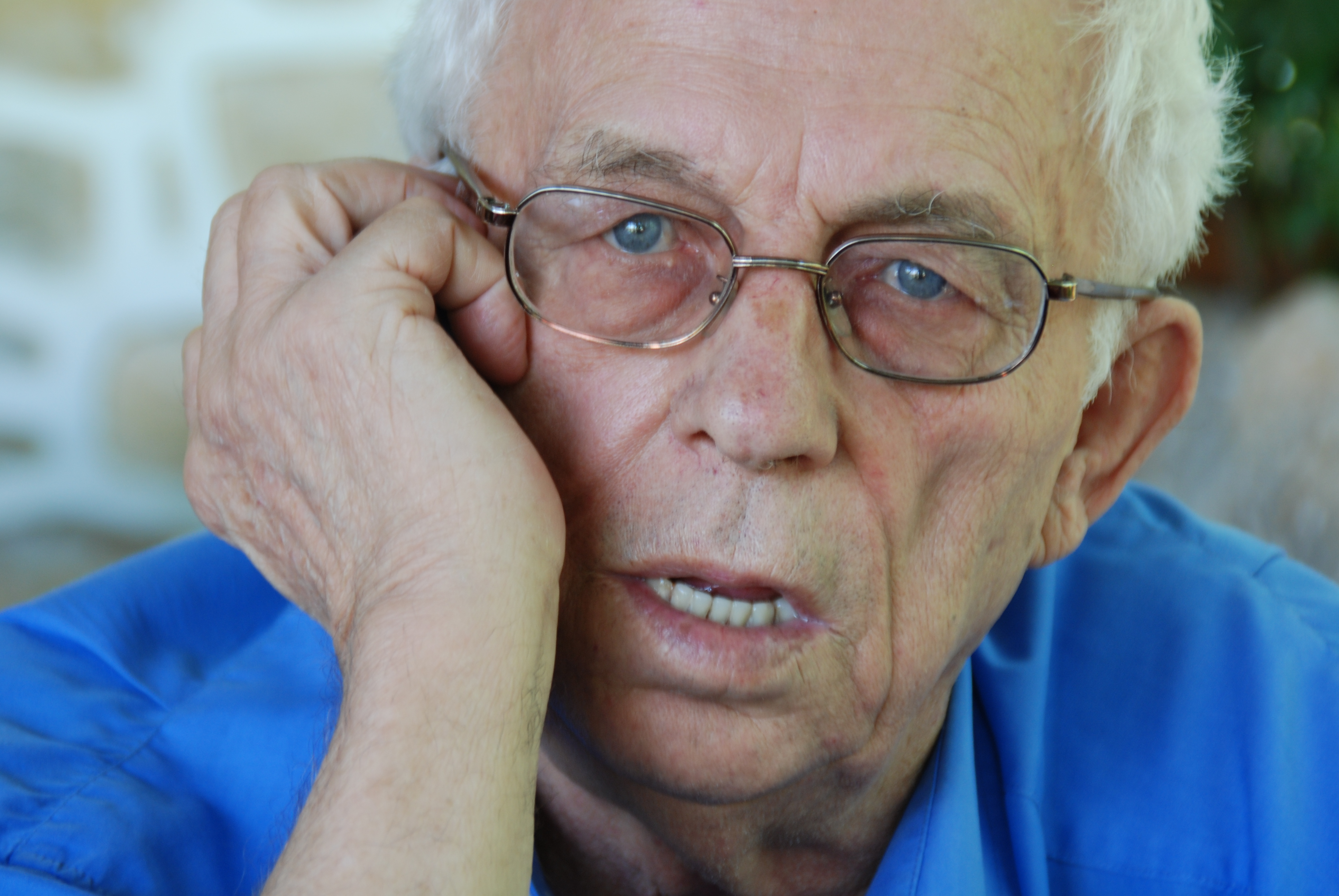
- Shkodrov in 2008
- Born: 10 February 1930; Lom, Kingdom of Bulgaria
- Died: 31 August 2010 (aged 80); Sofia, Bulgaria
- Scientific career
- Fields: Astronomy; physics

Vladimir Georgiev Shkodrov (Bulgarian: Владимир Георгиев Шкодров; 10 February 1930 – 31 August 2010) was a Bulgarian astronomer and professor at the Bulgarian Academy of Sciences. He is one of the founders of the Bulgarian National Observatory in Rozhen and authored numerous scientific and popular articles and books on planetary physics and astronomy.

Shkodrov discovered seven asteroids, including the near-Earth object 4486 Mithra, which he and Eric Elst discovered on 22 September 1987. Mithra is notable as the most highly bifurcated object in the Solar System.

Besides his rich scientific career, Vladimir Shkodrov was involved in education and in politics. He was the dean of the University of Shumen and a deputy in the 37th National Assembly of Republic of Bulgaria.

== List of discovered minor planets ==
4486 Mithra	22 September 1987	list^{[A]}
6636 Kintanar	11 September 1988	list
9732 Juchnovski	24 September 1984	list^{[B]}
11852 Shoumen	10 September 1988	list^{[B]}
11856 Nicolabonev	11 September 1988	list^{[B]}
14342 Iglika	23 September 1984	list^{[B]}
(14839) 1988 RH_{8}	11 September 1988	list
Co-discovery made with:^{A} E. W. Elst^{B} V. G. Ivanova

== Dissertation ==
Shkodrov, Vladimir (1975) Issledovanie pogreshnosti gravimetricheskih metodov opredelenia vneshnego potenciala planeti (Analysis of the errors of the gravimetric methods in defining the external planet potential). Defended in Leningrad/Moscow's State Institute for Astronomy.

== Honors ==
The main-belt asteroid 4364 Shkodrov, discovered by Eleanor Helin and Schelte Bus on 7 November 1978, is named in his honor. The official naming citation was published by the Minor Planet Center on 25 August 1991 (M.P.C. 18645).

== See also ==
- List of minor planet discoverers § V. G. Shkodrov

== Publications ==
=== Monographs ===
- Shkodrov, Vladimir (1973) Malki planeti v slunchevata sistema (Small planets in the Solar system). Sofia: Nauka i izkustvo
- Shkodrov, Vladimir (1989) Planeten potencial (Planetary Potential). Sofia: Bulgarian Academy of Sciences.
- Shkodrov, Vladimir (2005) Planetarna fizika (Planetary physics). Shumen: Shumen University Press.
- Shkodrov, Vladimir (2010) Etudi po istoria na astronomiata (Essays on History of Astronomy). Sofia: Prof. Marin Drinov

=== Other publications ===
- Shkodrov, V. & V. Ivanova, V. Umlenski, E. Dikova (1985) Haleevata kometa na put kum sluntseto (The comet of Halley on its way to the Sun). Sofia: Narodna prosveta.
