= 4429 Chinmoy =

Main-belt asteroid

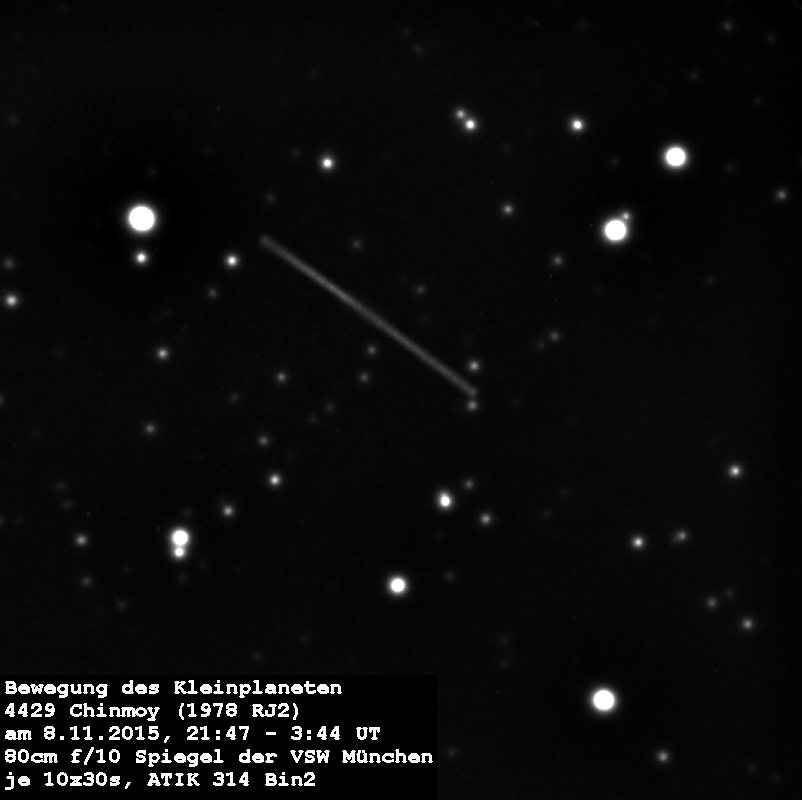
- Chinmoy imaged in November 2015

Discovery
- Discovered by: N. Chernykh
- Discovery site: Crimean Astrophysical Obs.
- Discovery date: 12 September 1978

Designations
- Named after: Sri Chinmoy (Indian spiritual leader)
- Alternative designations: 1978 RJ_{2} · 1978 RN_{1} 1978 RR_{4} · 1980 FP_{2} 1980 FX_{6} · 1987 DL_{2}
- Minor planet category: main-belt · (inner); Nysa–Polana complex

Orbital characteristics
- Epoch 05 May 2025 (JD 2460800.5)
- Uncertainty parameter 0
- Observation arc: 70.27 yr (25,667 d)
- Aphelion: 2.888 AU
- Perihelion: 1.873 AU
- Semi-major axis: 2.380 AU
- Eccentricity: 0.2133
- Orbital period (sidereal): 3.67 yr (1341 d)
- Mean anomaly: 227.617°
- Mean motion: 0° 16^{m} 6.24^{s} / day
- Inclination: 1.458°
- Longitude of ascending node: 326.847°
- Argument of perihelion: 67.979°

Physical characteristics
- Mean diameter: 3.498±0.959 km
- Synodic rotation period: P1= 44.99 ±0.05h P2= 50.35 ±0.08h
- Geometric albedo: 0.229±0.145
- Spectral type: S
- Absolute magnitude (H): 14.6

4429 Chinmoy, provisional designation 1978 RJ_{2}, is an asteroid from the inner regions of the asteroid belt, approximately 3.5 kilometers (2.2 miles) in diameter. It was discovered on 12 September 1978, by Soviet astronomer Nikolai Chernykh at the Crimean Astrophysical Observatory in Nauchnij, on the Crimean Peninsula. The likely S-type asteroid was named after Indian spiritual leader Sri Chinmoy.

== Orbit and classification ==
Chinmoy moving across the sky

Chinmoy is a member of the Nysa–Polana complex, a collection of overlapping asteroid families. It orbits the Sun in the inner main-belt at a distance of 1.9–2.9 AU once every 3 years and 8 months (1,341 days; semi-major axis of 2.38 AU). Its orbit has an eccentricity of 0.21 and an inclination of 1° with respect to the ecliptic.

The body's observation arc begins with a precovery taken at Palomar Observatory in February 1954, more than 24 years prior to its official discovery observation at Nauchnij.

== Physical characteristics ==
Chinmoy has an absolute magnitude of 14.6. While its spectral type has not been determined, it is assumed to be likely a stony S-type asteroid based on its albedo (see below). 4429 Chinmoy appears to be in non-principal axis rotation ("tumbling") with P1= 44.99 ±0.05h main period and P2= 50.35 ±0.08h secondary period (Center for Solar System Studies Observatory, August 2022).

=== Diameter and albedo ===
According to the survey carried out by the NEOWISE mission of NASA's Wide-field Infrared Survey Explorer, Chinmoy measures 3.498 kilometers in diameter and its surface has an albedo of 0.229.

== Naming ==
This minor planet was named after Indian spiritual leader Sri Chinmoy (1931–2007). The official naming citation was published by the Minor Planet Center on 25 April 1994 (M.P.C. 23351).
