= 4364 Shkodrov =

Main-belt asteroid

Discovery
- Discovered by: E. F. Helin; S. J. Bus
- Discovery site: Palomar Obs.
- Discovery date: 7 November 1978

Designations
- Named after: Vladimir Shkodrov (Bulgarian astronomer)
- Alternative designations: 1978 VV_{5} · 1983 CX_{1} 1988 RK_{3}
- Minor planet category: main-belt · (inner) background · Flora

Orbital characteristics
- Epoch 4 September 2017 (JD 2458000.5)
- Uncertainty parameter 0
- Observation arc: 39.06 yr (14,267 days)
- Aphelion: 2.6515 AU
- Perihelion: 2.0044 AU
- Semi-major axis: 2.3280 AU
- Eccentricity: 0.1390
- Orbital period (sidereal): 3.55 yr (1,297 days)
- Mean anomaly: 225.87°
- Mean motion: 0° 16^{m} 39^{s} / day
- Inclination: 1.7402°
- Longitude of ascending node: 139.75°
- Argument of perihelion: 46.929°

Physical characteristics
- Mean diameter: 4.21±1.00 km 4.94 km (calculated)
- Synodic rotation period: 17.256±0.0223 h (R); 17.302±0.0223 h (R); 17.3233±0.0005 h (Note: Pravec (2015) web: lightcurve plot (4364) Shkodrov with a rotation period 17.3233±0.0005 hours with a brightness amplitude of 0.42±0.03 mag. Sugarloaf Mountain and collaboration. Quality Code of (3-). Summary figures for at LCDB and Pravec, P.; Wolf, M.; Sarounova, L. (2015) from Ondrejov data obtained by the NEO Photometric Program and collaborating projects)
- Geometric albedo: 0.24±0.10; 0.24 (assumed)
- Spectral type: S (assumed)
- Absolute magnitude (H): 13.696±0.005 (R) · 13.7 · 13.80±0.26 · 14.10

4364 Shkodrov, provisional designation 1978 VV_{5}, is a background asteroid from the inner regions of the asteroid belt, approximately 4.5 kilometers in diameter. It was discovered on 7 November 1978, by American astronomers Eleanor Helin and Schelte Bus at the Palomar Observatory in California. The asteroid was named after Bulgarian astronomer Vladimir Shkodrov.

== Orbit and classification ==
Shkodrov is a non-family asteroid of the main belt's background population when applying the hierarchical clustering method to its proper orbital elements. Based on osculating Keplerian orbital elements, the asteroid has also been classified as a member of the Flora family (402), a giant asteroid family and the largest family of stony asteroids in the asteroid belt.

It orbits the Sun in the inner main belt at a distance of 2.0–2.7 AU once every 3 years and 7 months (1,297 days; semi-major axis of 2.33 AU). Its orbit has an eccentricity of 0.14 and an inclination of 2° with respect to the ecliptic. The body's observation arc begins at Palomar Observatory, two nights prior to its official discovery observation.

== Physical characteristics ==
Shkodrov is an assumed, stony S-type asteroid, which is also the overall spectral type for members of the Flora family.

=== Rotation period ===
In 2010 and 2013, two rotational lightcurves of Shkodrov have been obtained by astronomers at the Palomar Transient Factory in California. Lightcurve analysis of the photometric observations in the R-band gave a rotation period of 17.256 and 17.302 hours with a brightness variation of 0.40 and 0.35 magnitude, respectively (U=2/2). In 2015, Petr Pravec published a refined period of 17.3233 hours and an amplitude of 0.42 magnitude (U=3-).

=== Diameter and albedo ===
According to the survey carried out by the NEOWISE mission of NASA's Wide-field Infrared Survey Explorer, Shkodrov measures 4.21 kilometers in diameter and its surface has an albedo of 0.24. The Collaborative Asteroid Lightcurve Link assumes an identical albedo of 0.24 – derived from 8 Flora, the Flora family's parent body – and calculates a diameter of 4.94 kilometers based on an absolute magnitude of 13.7.

== Naming ==
This minor planet was named after Bulgarian astronomer Vladimir Shkodrov (1930–2010), professor at the Bulgarian Academy of Sciences and founder of the Bulgarian National Observatory. The asteroid also honors his collaboration with the discoverers on the International Near-Earth Asteroid Survey despite difficult times. The official naming citation was published by the Minor Planet Center on 25 August 1991 (M.P.C. 18645).
