= Optical spectrometer =

Instrument to measure the properties of visible light

Grating spectrometer schematic

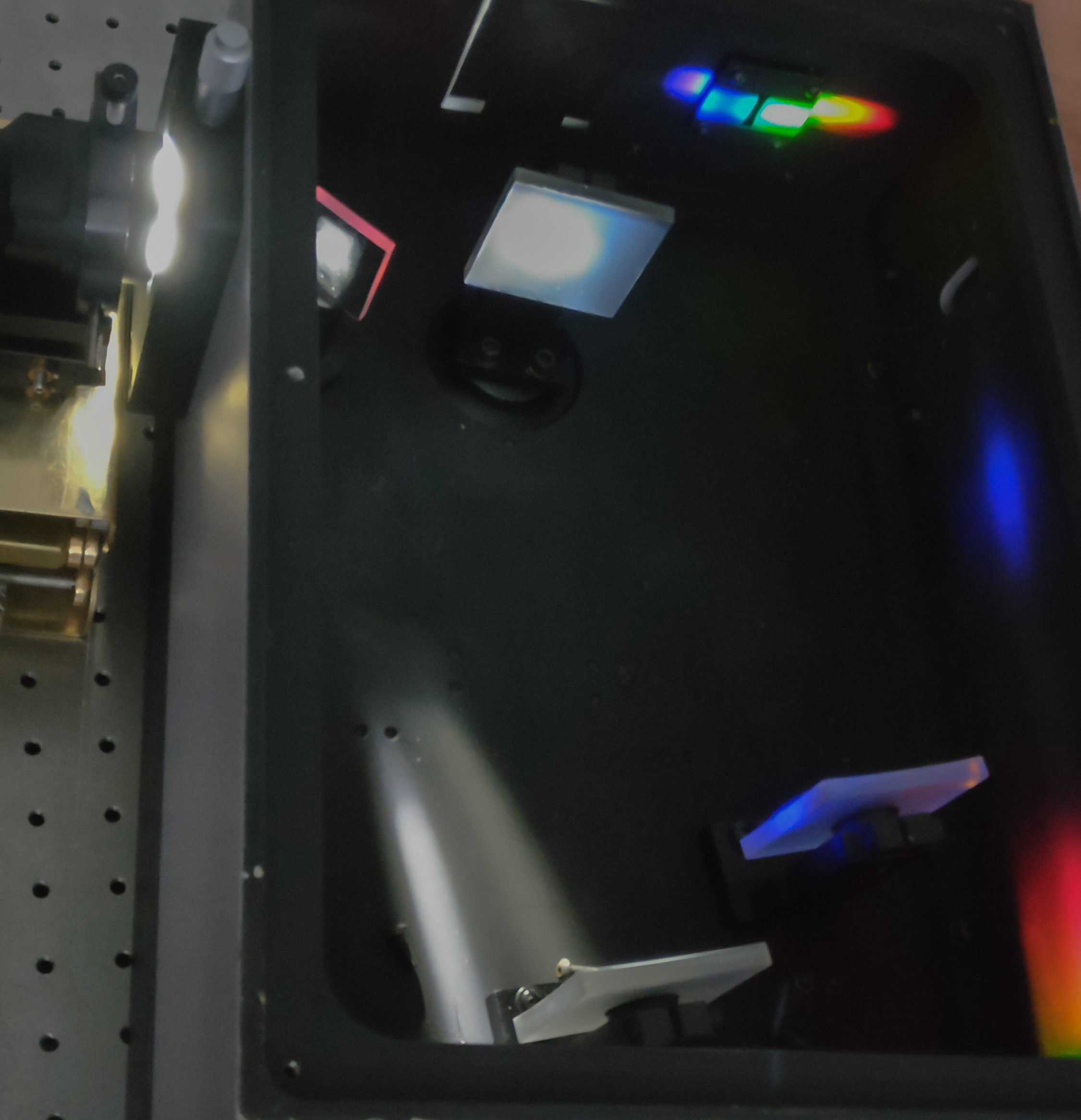
Internal structure of a grating spectrometer: Light comes from left side and diffracts on the upper middle reflective grating. The wavelength of light is then selected by the slit on the upper right corner.

An optical spectrometer (spectrophotometer, spectrograph or spectroscope) is an instrument used to measure properties of light over a specific portion of the electromagnetic spectrum, typically used in spectroscopic analysis to identify materials. The variable measured is most often the irradiance of the light but could also, for instance, be the polarization state. The independent variable is usually the wavelength of the light or a closely derived physical quantity, such as the corresponding wavenumber or the photon energy, in units of measurement such as centimeters, reciprocal centimeters, or electron volts, respectively.

A spectrometer is used in spectroscopy for producing spectral lines and measuring their wavelengths and intensities. Spectrometers may operate over a wide range of non-optical wavelengths, from gamma rays and X-rays into the far infrared. If the instrument is designed to measure the spectrum on an absolute scale rather than a relative one, then it is typically called a spectrophotometer. The majority of spectrophotometers are used in spectral regions near the visible spectrum.

A spectrometer that is calibrated for measurement of the incident optical power is called a spectroradiometer.

In general, any particular instrument will operate over a small portion of this total range because of the different techniques used to measure different portions of the spectrum. Below optical frequencies (that is, at microwave and radio frequencies), the spectrum analyzer is a closely related electronic device.

Spectrometers are used in many fields. For example, they are used in astronomy to analyze the radiation from objects and deduce their chemical composition. The spectrometer uses a prism or a grating to spread the light into a spectrum. This allows astronomers to detect many of the chemical elements by their characteristic spectral lines. These lines are named for the elements which cause them, such as the hydrogen alpha, beta, and gamma lines. A glowing object will show bright spectral lines. Dark lines are made by absorption, for example by light passing through a gas cloud, and these absorption lines can also identify chemical compounds. Much of our knowledge of the chemical makeup of the universe comes from spectra.

== Spectroscopes ==
Spectroscope
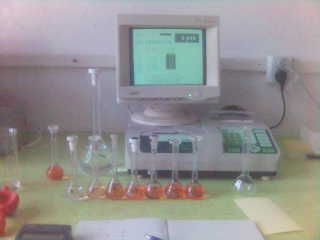
- Other names: Spectrograph
- Related items: Mass spectrograph

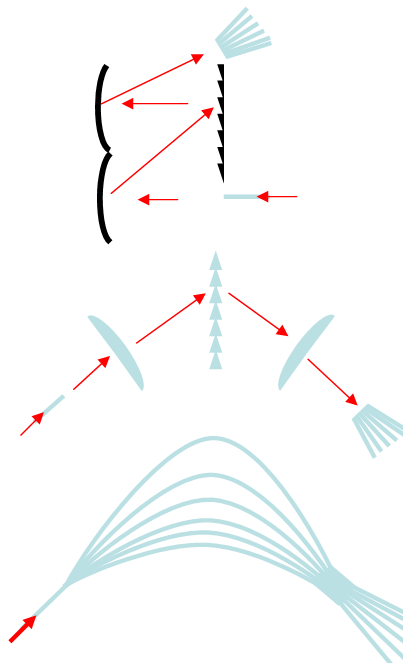
Comparison of different diffraction based spectrometers: Reflection optics, refraction optics, fiber/integrated optics

Spectroscopes are often used in astronomy and some branches of chemistry. Early spectroscopes were simply prisms with graduations marking wavelengths of light. Modern spectroscopes generally use a diffraction grating, a movable slit, and some kind of photodetector, all automated and controlled by a computer. Recent advances have seen increasing reliance of computational algorithms in a range of miniaturised spectrometers without diffraction gratings, for example, through the use of quantum dot-based filter arrays on to a CCD chip or a series of photodetectors realised on a single nanostructure.

Joseph von Fraunhofer developed the first modern spectroscope by combining a prism, diffraction slit and telescope in a manner that increased the spectral resolution and was reproducible in other laboratories. Fraunhofer also went on to invent the first diffraction spectroscope. Gustav Robert Kirchhoff and Robert Bunsen discovered the application of spectroscopes to chemical analysis and used this approach to discover caesium and rubidium. Kirchhoff and Bunsen's analysis also enabled a chemical explanation of stellar spectra, including Fraunhofer lines.

When a material is heated to incandescence it emits light that is characteristic of the atomic makeup of the material. Particular light frequencies give rise to sharply defined bands on the scale which can be thought of as fingerprints. For example, the element sodium has a very characteristic double yellow band known as the Sodium D-lines at 588.9950 and 589.5924 nanometers, the color of which will be familiar to anyone who has seen a low pressure sodium vapor lamp.

In the original spectroscope design in the early 19th century, light entered a slit and a collimating lens transformed the light into a thin beam of parallel rays. The light then passed through a prism (in hand-held spectroscopes, usually an Amici prism) that refracted the beam into a spectrum because different wavelengths were refracted different amounts due to dispersion. This image was then viewed through a tube with a scale that was transposed upon the spectral image, enabling its direct measurement.

With the development of photographic film, the more accurate spectrograph was created. It was based on the same principle as the spectroscope, but it had a camera in place of the viewing tube. In recent years, the electronic circuits built around the photomultiplier tube have replaced the camera, allowing real-time spectrographic analysis with far greater accuracy. Arrays of photosensors are also used in place of film in spectrographic systems. Such spectral analysis, or spectroscopy, has become an important scientific tool for analyzing the composition of unknown material and for studying astronomical phenomena and testing astronomical theories.

In modern spectrographs in the UV, visible, and near-IR spectral ranges, the spectrum is generally given in the form of photon number per unit wavelength (nm or μm), wavenumber (μm^{−1}, cm^{−1}), frequency (THz), or energy (eV), with the units indicated by the abscissa. In the mid- to far-IR, spectra are typically expressed in units of Watts per unit wavelength (μm) or wavenumber (cm^{−1}). In many cases, the spectrum is displayed with the units left implied (such as "digital counts" per spectral channel).

A comparison of the four abscissa types typically used for visible spectrometers

A comparison of the four abscissa types typically used for infrared spectrometers

=== In Gemology ===
Gemologists frequently use spectroscopes to determine the absorption spectra of gemstones, thereby allowing them to make inferences about what kind of gem they are examining. A gemologist may compare the absorption spectrum they observe with a catalogue of spectra for various gems to help narrow down the exact identity of the gem.

== Spectrographs ==
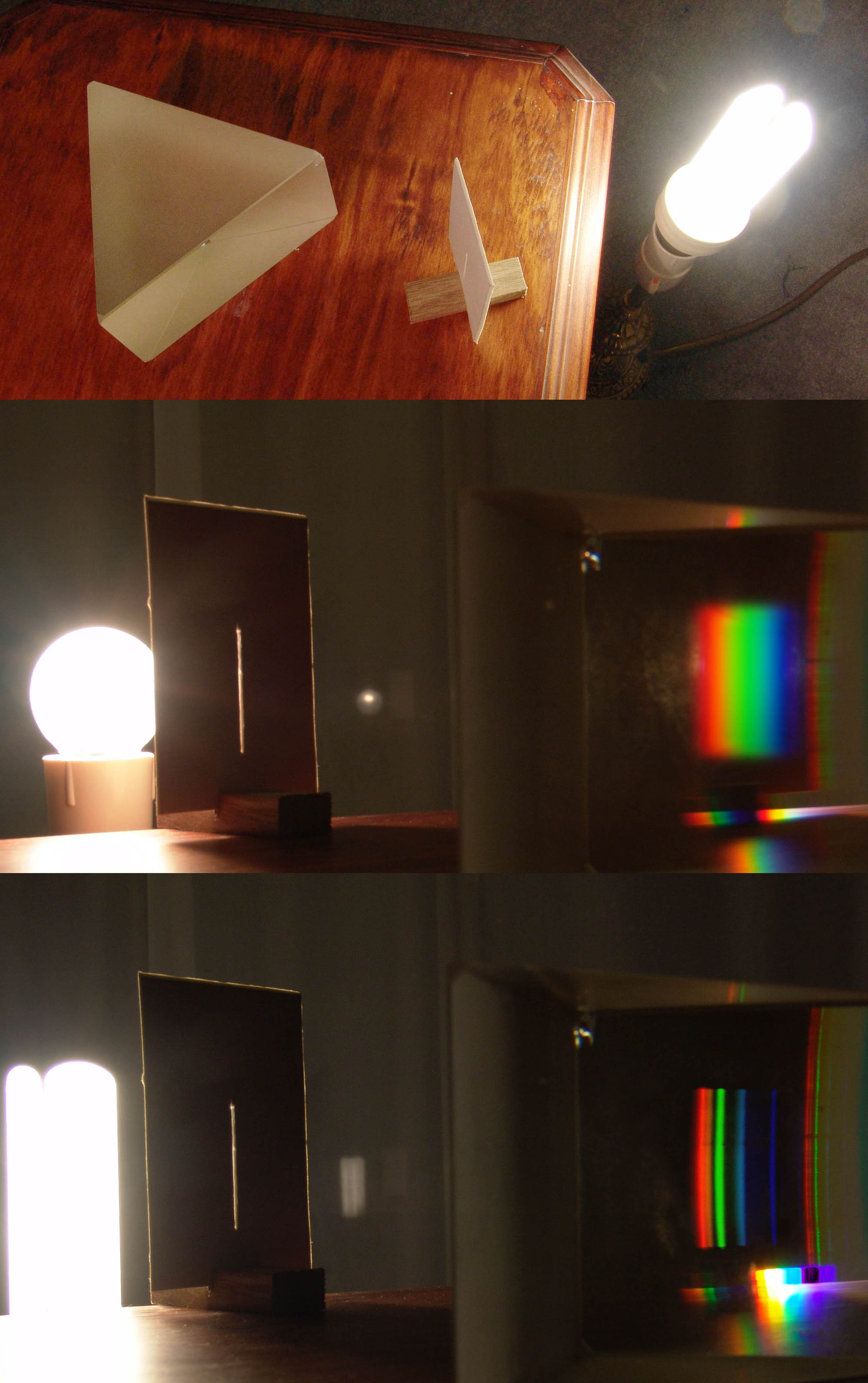
A very simple spectroscope based on a prism

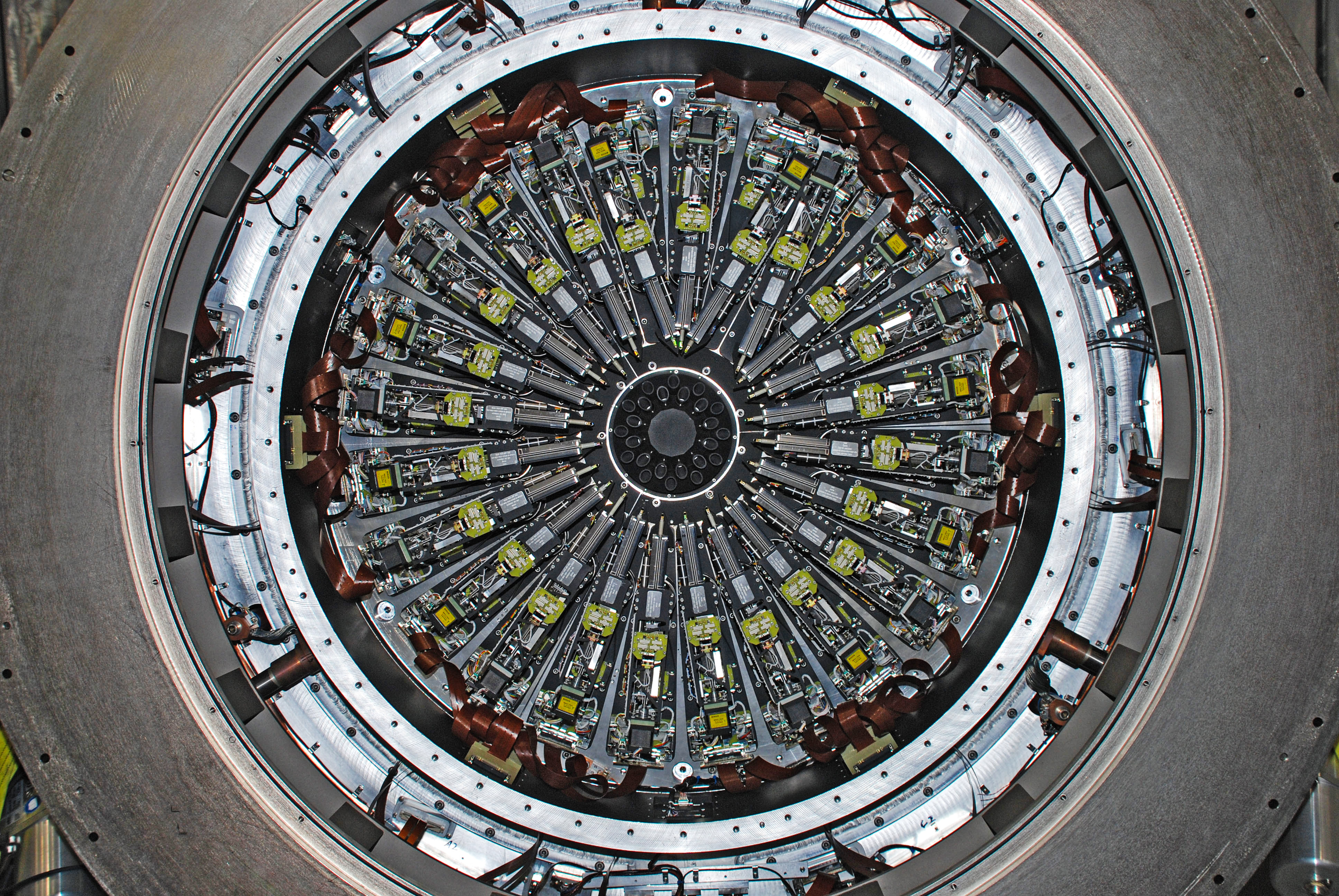
The KMOS spectrograph.

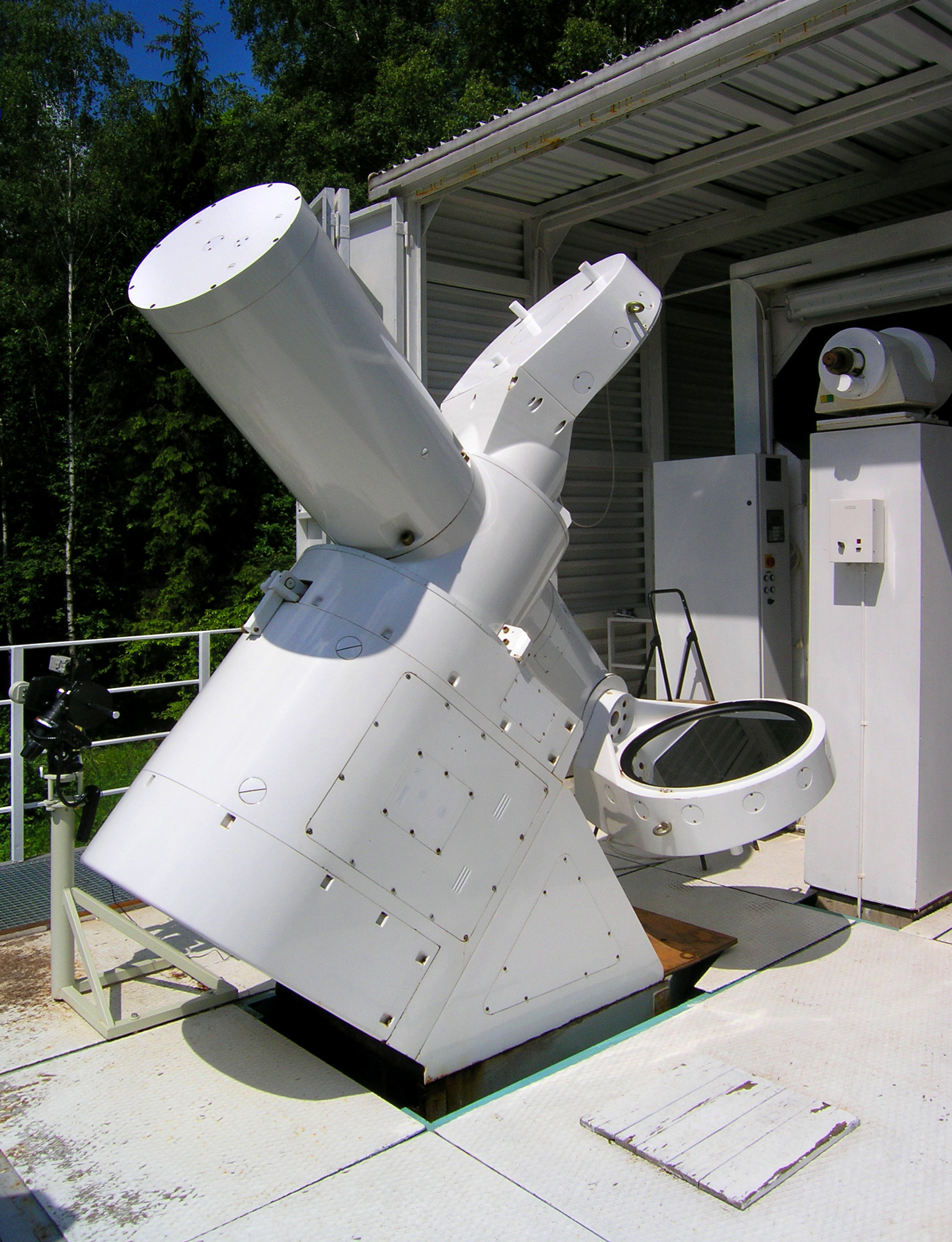
Horizontal Solar Spectrograph at the Czech Astronomical Institute in Ondřejov

A spectrograph is an instrument that separates light into its wavelengths and records the data. A spectrograph typically has a multi-channel detector system or camera that detects and records the spectrum of light.

The term was first used in 1876 by Dr. Henry Draper when he invented the earliest version of this device, and which he used to take several photographs of the spectrum of Vega. This earliest version of the spectrograph was cumbersome to use and difficult to manage. Jackson S. Richardson and Johnathon D. Hogan popularized the machine.

There are several kinds of machines referred to as spectrographs, depending on the precise nature of the waves. The first spectrographs used photographic paper as the detector. The plant pigment phytochrome was discovered using a spectrograph that used living plants as the detector. More recent spectrographs use electronic detectors, such as CCDs which can be used for both visible and UV light. The exact choice of detector depends on the wavelengths of light to be recorded.

A spectrograph is sometimes called polychromator, as an analogy to monochromator.

=== Stellar and solar spectrograph ===
The star spectral classification and discovery of the main sequence, Hubble's law and the Hubble sequence were all made with spectrographs that used photographic paper. James Webb Space Telescope contains both a near-infrared spectrograph (NIRSpec) and a mid-infrared spectrograph (MIRI).

=== Echelle spectrograph ===
An echelle-based spectrograph uses two diffraction gratings, rotated 90 degrees with respect to each other and placed close to one another. Therefore, an entrance point and not a slit is used and a CCD-chip records the spectrum. Both gratings have a wide spacing, and one is blazed so that only the first order is visible and the other is blazed with many higher orders visible, so a very fine spectrum is presented to the CCD.

=== Slitless spectrograph ===
In conventional spectrographs, a slit is inserted into the beam to limit the image extent in the dispersion direction. A slitless spectrograph omits the slit; this results in images that convolve the image information with spectral information along the direction of dispersion. If the field is not sufficiently sparse, then spectra from different sources in the image field will overlap. The trade is that slitless spectrographs can produce spectral images much more quickly than scanning a conventional spectrograph. That is useful in applications such as solar physics where time evolution is important.

== See also ==
- Circular dichroism
- Cosmic Origins Spectrograph
- Czerny-Turner monochromator
- Imaging spectrometer
- List of astronomical instruments
- List of light sources
- Long-slit spectroscopy
- Prism spectrometer
- Scanning mobility particle sizer
- Spectrogram
- Spectrometer
- Spectroradiometer
- Spectroscopy
- Virtually imaged phased array

== Bibliography ==
- J. F. James and R. S. Sternberg (1969), The Design of Optical Spectrometers (Chapman and Hall Ltd)
- James, John (2007), Spectrograph Design Fundamentals (Cambridge University Press) ISBN 0-521-86463-1
- Browning, John (1882), How to work with the spectroscope : a manual of practical manipulation with spectroscopes of all kinds
- Palmer, Christopher (2020). Diffraction Grating Handbook (8th ed.). MKS Newport.
