= Aleksandr Balandin =

Aleksandr Balandin may refer to:

- Aleksandr Balandin (gymnast) (born 1989), Russian gymnast
- Alexander A. Balandin, Russian-American electrical engineer and materials scientist
- Aleksandr Nikolayevich Balandin (born 1953), Russian cosmonaut

== See also ==
- Balandin
