= Prism spectrometer =

Setup of a prism spectrometer

Setup of a prism spectrometer (low angle with light)

Setup of a prism spectrometer (high angle with light)

A prism spectrometer is an optical spectrometer which uses a dispersive prism as its dispersive element. The prism refracts light into its different colors (wavelengths). The dispersion occurs because the angle of refraction is dependent on the refractive index of the prism's material, which in turn is slightly dependent on the wavelength of light that is traveling through it.

== Theory ==
Light is emitted from a source such as a vapor lamp. A slit selects a thin strip of light which passes through the collimator where it gets parallelized. The aligned light then passes through the prism in which it is refracted twice (once when entering and once when leaving). Due to the nature of a dispersive element the angle with which light is refracted depends on its wavelength. This leads to a spectrum of thin lines of light, each being observable at a different angle. A lens or telescope is then used to form images of the original slit, with images formed using different wavelengths of light at different positions. If a real image is formed, it can be recorded on film or an image sensor, making the device a spectrograph.

Replacing the prism with a diffraction grating would result in a grating spectrometer. Optical gratings are less expensive, provide much higher resolution, and are easier to calibrate, due to their linear diffraction dependency. A prism's refraction angle varies nonlinearly with wavelength. On the other hand, gratings have significant intensity losses.

== Usage ==
=== Spectroscopy ===
A prism spectrometer may be used to determine the composition of a material from its emitted spectral lines.

=== Measurement of refractive indices ===
A prism spectrometer may be used to measure the refractive index of a material if the wavelengths of the light used are known. The calibration of a prism spectrometer is carried out with known spectral lines from vapor lamps or laser light.
