= OAG =

OAG may refer to:

== Air travel ==
- OAG (company), also known as Official Airline Guide, a UK-based air travel intelligence company
- Orange Airport, New South Wales, Australia (IATA airport code: OAG)

== Offices ==
- Office of the Attorney General
  - Ohio Attorney General, United States
- Office of the Advocate General for Scotland
- Office of the Auditor General (disambiguation)

== Other uses ==
- OAG (band), a Malaysian rock band
- Overly Attached Girlfriend, a 2012 internet meme
- Optical axis gratings
- Ottawa Art Gallery, Canada
- Jamie Oag (born 1966), a Scottish businessman
- Organizational-activity game, for facilitating organizational change
