= Ultrafast monochromator =

An ultrafast monochromator is a monochromator that preserves the duration of an ultrashort pulse (in the femtosecond, or lower, time-scale). Monochromators are devices that select for a particular wavelength, typically using a diffraction grating to disperse the light and a slit to select the desired wavelength; however, a diffraction grating introduces path delays that measurably lengthen the duration of an ultrashort pulse. An ultrafast monochromator uses a second diffraction grating to compensate time delays introduced to the pulse by the first grating and other dispersive optical elements.

== Diffraction grating ==
Diffraction gratings are constructed such that the angle of the incident ray, θ_{i}, is related to the angle of the mth outgoing ray, θ_{m}, by the expression

$$m \lambda = d ( \sin{\theta_i} - \sin{\theta_m})$$.

Two rays diffracted by adjacent grooves will differ in path length by a distance mλ. The total difference between the longest and shortest path within a beam is computed by multiplying mλ by the total number of grooves illuminated.

For instance, a beam of width 10 mm illuminating a grating with 1200 grooves/mm uses 12,000 grooves. At a wavelength of 10 nm, the first order diffracted beam, m = 1, will have a path length variation across the beam of 120 μm. This corresponds to a time difference in the arrival of 400 femtoseconds. This is often negligible for picosecond pulses but not for those of femtosecond duration.

== Applications ==
A major application is the extraction, without time-broadening, of a single high-order harmonic pulse out of the many generated by an ultrafast laser pulse interacting with a gas target.

== See also ==
- Ultrashort pulse
- DESY
