= Brillouin scattering =

Interaction of light with material waves in a medium

In electromagnetism, Brillouin scattering or Brillouin light scattering (BLS), named after Léon Brillouin, refers to the interaction of light with the material waves in a medium (e.g. electrostriction and magnetostriction, or radiation pressure). It is mediated by the refractive index dependence on the material properties of the medium; as described in optics, the index of refraction of a transparent material changes under deformation (compression-distension or shear-skewing).

The result of the interaction between the light-wave and the carrier-deformation wave is that a fraction of the transmitted light-wave changes its momentum (thus its frequency and energy) in preferential directions, as if by diffraction caused by an oscillating 3-dimensional diffraction grating.

If the medium is a solid crystal, a macromolecular chain condensate or a viscous liquid or gas, then the low frequency atomic-chain-deformation waves within the transmitting medium (not the transmitted electro-magnetic wave) in the carrier (represented as a quasiparticle) could be for example:

1. mass oscillation (acoustic) modes (called phonons);
2. charge displacement modes (in dielectrics, called polarons);
3. magnetic spin oscillation modes (in magnetic materials, called magnons).

== Mechanism ==

From the perspective of solid state physics, Brillouin scattering is an interaction between an electromagnetic wave and one of the three above-mentioned crystalline lattice waves (e.g. electrostriction and magnetostriction). The scattering is inelastic i.e. the photon may lose energy (Stokes process) and in the process create one of the three quasiparticle types (phonon, polariton, magnon) or it may gain energy (anti-Stokes process) by absorbing one of those quasiparticle types. Such a shift in photon energy, corresponding to a Brillouin shift in frequency, is equal to the energy of the released or absorbed quasiparticle. Thus, Brillouin scattering can be used to measure the energies, wavelengths and frequencies of various atomic chain oscillation types ('quasiparticles'). To measure a Brillouin shift a commonly employed device called the Brillouin spectrometer is used, the design of which is derived from a Fabry–Pérot interferometer. Alternatively, high-speed photodiodes, such as those recovered from inexpensive 25-gigabit Ethernet optical transceivers, may be used in combination with a software-defined radio or RF spectrum analyzer.

== Contrast with Rayleigh scattering ==
Rayleigh scattering, too, can be considered to be due to fluctuations in the density, composition and orientation of molecules within the transmitting medium, and hence of its refraction index, in small volumes of matter (particularly in gases or liquids). The difference is that Rayleigh scattering involves only the random and incoherent thermal fluctuations, in contrast with the correlated, periodic fluctuations (phonons) that cause Brillouin scattering. Moreover, Rayleigh scattering is elastic in that no energy is lost or gained.

== Contrast with Raman scattering ==
Raman scattering is another phenomenon that involves inelastic scattering of light caused by the vibrational properties of matter. The detected range of frequency shifts and other effects are very different compared to Brillouin scattering. In Raman scattering, photons are scattered by the effect of vibrational and rotational transitions in the bonds between first-order neighboring atoms, while Brillouin scattering results from the scattering of photons caused by large scale, low-frequency phonons. The effects of the two phenomena provide very different information about the sample: Raman spectroscopy can be used to determine the transmitting medium's chemical composition and molecular structure, while Brillouin scattering can be used to measure the material's properties on a larger scale – such as its elastic behavior. The frequency shifts from Brillouin scattering, a technique known as Brillouin spectroscopy, are detected with an interferometer while Raman scattering uses either an interferometer or a dispersive (grating) spectrometer.

== Stimulated Brillouin scattering ==
For intense beams of light (e.g. laser) traveling in a medium or in a waveguide, such as an optical fiber, the variations in the electric field of the beam itself may induce acoustic vibrations in the medium via electrostriction or radiation pressure. The beam may display Brillouin scattering as a result of those vibrations, usually in the direction opposite the incoming beam, a phenomenon known as stimulated Brillouin scattering (SBS). For liquids and gases, the frequency shifts typically created are of the order of 1–10 GHz resulting in wavelength shifts of ~1–10 pm in the visible light. Stimulated Brillouin scattering is one effect by which optical phase conjugation can take place.

== Discovery ==
Inelastic scattering of light caused by acoustic phonons was first predicted by Léon Brillouin in 1914 . Leonid Mandelstam is believed to have recognised the possibility of such scattering as early as 1918, but he published his idea only in 1926. In order to credit Mandelstam, the effect is also called Brillouin-Mandelstam scattering (BMS). Other commonly used names are Brillouin light scattering (BLS) and Brillouin-Mandelstam light scattering (BMLS).

The process of stimulated Brillouin scattering (SBS) was first observed by Chiao et al. in 1964. The optical phase conjugation aspect of the SBS process was discovered by Boris Yakovlevich Zeldovich et al. in 1972.

== Fiber optic sensing ==
Brillouin scattering can also be employed to sense mechanical strain and temperature in optical fibers.

== See also ==
- Brillouin spectroscopy
- Scattering
- Raman scattering
- Nonlinear optics
