= Virtually imaged phased array =

Dispersive optical device

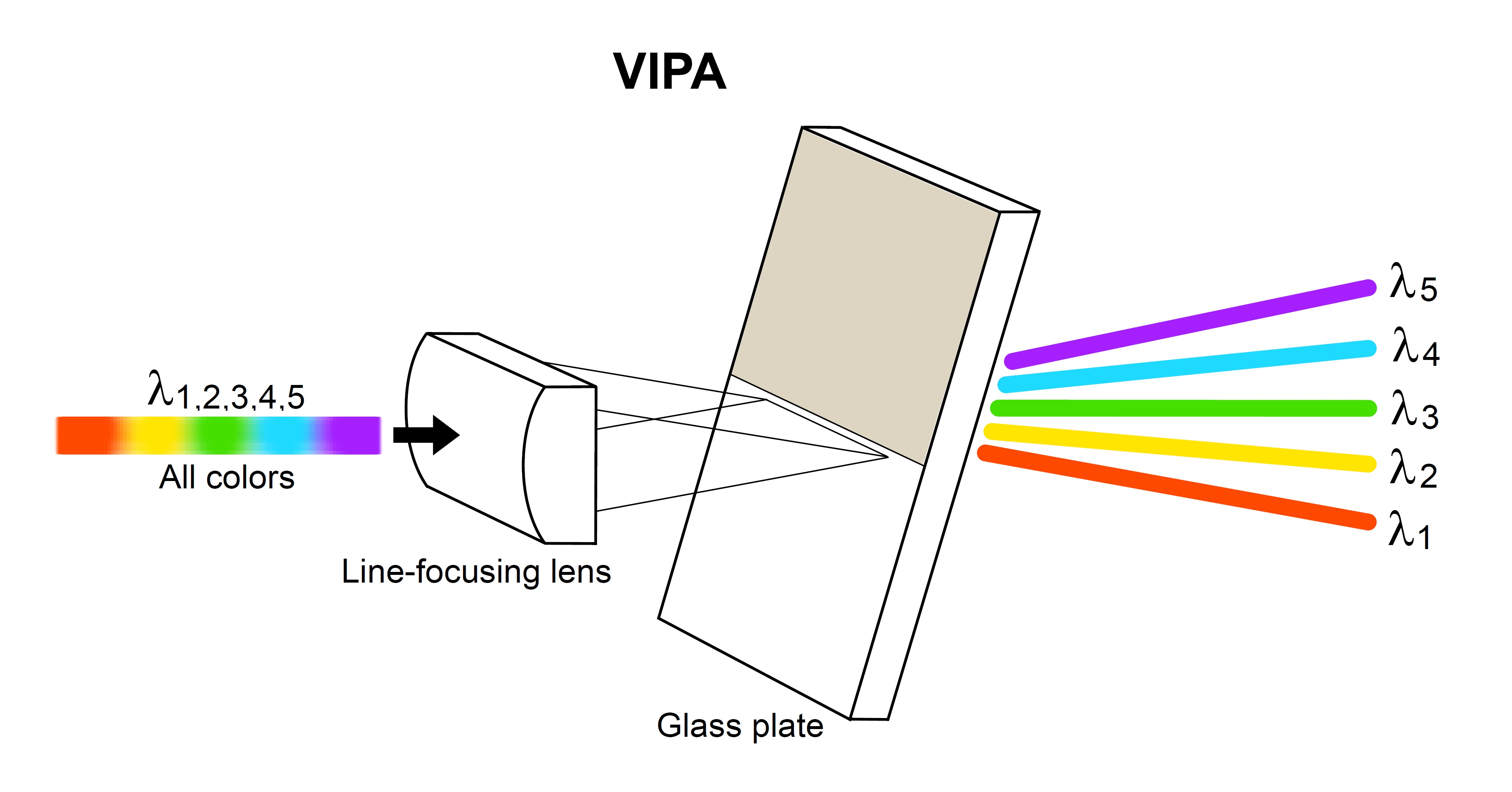
Function and structure of VIPA

A virtually imaged phased array (VIPA) is an angular dispersive device that, like a prism or a diffraction grating, splits light into its spectral components. The device works almost independently of polarization. In contrast to prisms or regular diffraction gratings, the VIPA has a much higher angular dispersion but has a smaller free spectral range. This aspect is similar to that of an Echelle grating, since it also uses high diffraction orders. To overcome this disadvantage, the VIPA can be combined with a diffraction grating. The VIPA is a compact spectral disperser with high wavelength resolving power.

== Basic mechanism ==
In a virtually imaged phased array, the phased array is the optical analogue of a phased array antenna at radio frequencies. Unlike a diffraction grating which can be interpreted as a real phased array, in a virtually imaged phased array the phased array is created in a virtual image. More specifically, the optical phased array is virtually formed with multiple virtual images of a light source. This is the fundamental difference from an Echelle grating, where a similar phased array is formed in the real space. The virtual images of a light source in the VIPA are automatically aligned exactly at a constant interval, which is critical for optical interference. This is an advantage of the VIPA over an Echelle grating. When the output light is observed, the virtually imaged phased array works as if light were emitted from a real phased array.

== History and applications ==
VIPA was proposed and named by Shirasaki in 1996. Prior to the publication in the paper, a preliminary presentation was given by Shirasaki at a conference. This presentation was reported in Laser Focus World. The details of this new approach to producing angular dispersion were described in the patent. Since then, in the first ten years, the VIPA was of particular interest in the field of optical fiber communication technology. The VIPA was first applied to optical wavelength division multiplexing (WDM) and a wavelength demultiplexer was demonstrated for a channel spacing of 0.8 nm, which was a standard channel spacing at the time. Later, a much smaller channel separation of 24 pm and a 3 dB bandwidth of 6 pm were achieved by Weiner in 2005 at 1550 nm wavelength range. For another application, by utilizing the wavelength-dependent length of the light path due to the angular dispersion of the VIPA, the compensation of chromatic dispersion of fibers was studied and demonstrated (Shirasaki, 1997). The compensation was further developed for tunable systems by using adjustable mirrors or a spatial light modulator (Weiner, 2006). Using the VIPA, compensation of polarization mode dispersion was also achieved (Weiner, 2008). Furthermore, pulse shaping using the combination of a VIPA for high-resolution wavelength splitting/recombining and a SLM was demonstrated (Weiner, 2010).

A drawback of the VIPA is its limited free spectral range due to the high diffraction order. To expand the functional wavelength range, Shirasaki combined a VIPA with a regular diffraction grating in 1997 to provide a broadband two-dimensional spectral disperser. This configuration can be a high performance substitute for diffraction gratings in many grating applications. After the mid 2000s, the two-dimensional VIPA disperser has been used in various fields and devices, such as high-resolution WDM (Weiner, 2004), a laser frequency comb (Diddams, 2007), a spectrometer (Nugent-Glandorf, 2012), astrophysical instruments (Le Coarer, 2017, Bourdarot, 2018, Delboulbé, 2022, and Stacey, 2024), Brillouin spectroscopy in biomechanics (Scarcelli, 2008, Rosa, 2018, and Margueritat, 2020), other Brillouin spectroscopy (Loubeyre, 2022 and Wu, 2023), beam scanning (Ford, 2008), microscopy (Jalali, 2009), tomography imaging (Ellerbee, 2014), metrology (Bhattacharya, 2015), fiber laser (Xu, 2020), LiDAR (Fu, 2021), and surface measurement (Zhu, 2022).

== Structure and operational principle ==
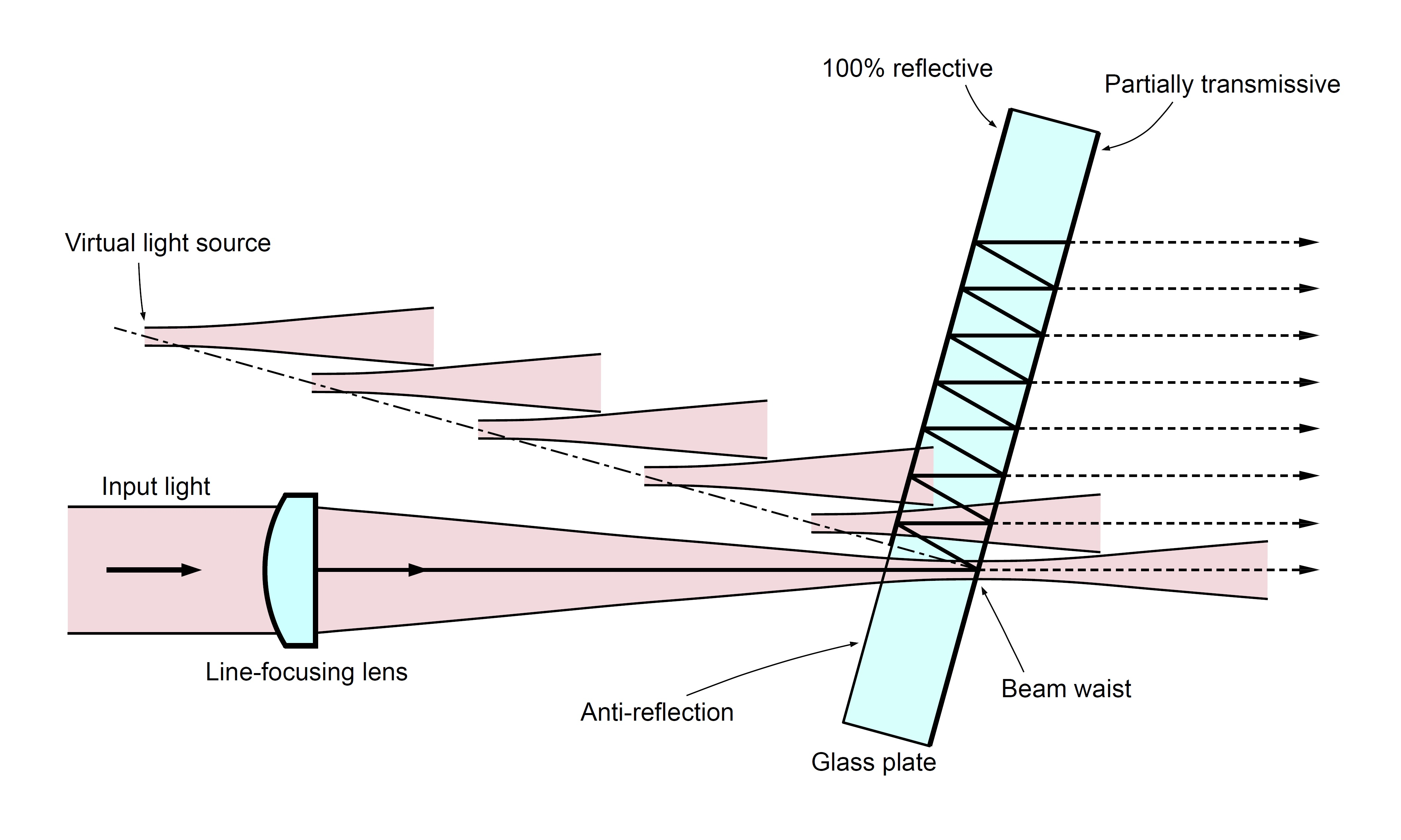
Operational principle of VIPA

The main component of a VIPA is a glass plate whose normal is slightly tilted with respect to the input light. One side (light input side) of the glass plate is coated with a 100% reflective mirror and the other side (light output side) is coated with a highly reflective but partially transmissive mirror. The side with the 100% reflective mirror has an anti-reflection coated light entrance area, through which a light beam enters the glass plate. The input light is line-focused to a line (focal line) on the partially transmissive mirror on the light output side. A typical line-focusing lens is a cylindrical lens, which is also part of the VIPA. The light beam is diverging after the beam waist located at the line-focused position.

After the light enters the glass plate through the light entrance area, the light is reflected at the partially transmissive mirror and the 100% reflective mirror, and thus the light travels back and forth between the partially transmissive mirror and the 100% reflective mirror.

It is noted that the glass plate is tilted as a result of its slight rotation where the axis of rotation is the focal line. This rotation/tilt prevents the light from leaving the glass plate out of the light entrance area. Therefore, in order for the optical system to work as a VIPA, there is a critical minimum angle of tilt that allows the light entering through the light entrance area to return only to the 100% reflective mirror. Below this angle, the function of the VIPA is severely impaired. If the tilting angle were zero, the reflected light from the partially transmissive mirror would travel exactly in reverse and exit the glass plate through the light entrance area without being reflected by the 100% reflective mirror. In the figure, refraction at the surfaces of the glass plate was ignored for simplicity.

When the light beam is reflected each time at the partially transmissive mirror, a small portion of the light power passes through the mirror and travels away from the glass plate. For a light beam passing through the mirror after multiple reflections, the position of the line-focus can be seen in the virtual image when observed from the light output side. Therefore, this light beam travels as if it originated at a virtual light source located at the position of the line-focus and diverged from the virtual light source. The positions of the virtual light sources for all the transmitted light beams automatically align along the normal to the glass plate with a constant spacing, that is, a number of virtual light sources are superimposed to create an optical phased array. Due to the interference of all the light beams, the phased array emits a collimated light beam in one direction, which is at a wavelength dependent angle, and therefore, an angular dispersion is produced.

== Wavelength resolution ==
Similarly to the resolving power of a diffraction grating, which is determined by the number of the illuminated grating elements and the order of diffraction, the resolving power of a VIPA is determined by the reflectivity of the back surface of the VIPA and the thickness of the glass plate. For a fixed thickness, a high reflectivity causes light to stay longer in the VIPA. This creates more virtual sources of light and thus increases the resolving power. On the other hand, with a lower reflectivity, the light in the VIPA is quickly lost, meaning fewer virtual sources of light are superimposed. This results in lower resolving power.

For large angular dispersion with high resolving power, the dimensions of the VIPA should be accurately controlled. Fine tuning of the VIPA characteristics was demonstrated by developing an elastomer-based structure (Metz, 2013).

A constant reflectivity of the partially transmissive mirror in the VIPA produces a Lorentzian power distribution when the output light is imaged onto a screen, which has a negative effect on the wavelength selectivity. This can be improved by providing the partially transmissive mirror with a linearly decreasing reflectivity. This leads to a Gaussian-like power distribution on a screen and improves the wavelength selectivity or the resolving power.

== Spectral dispersion law ==
An analytical calculation of the VIPA was first performed by Vega and Weiner in 2003 based on the theory of plane waves and an improved model based on the Fresnel diffraction theory was developed by Xiao and Weiner in 2004.

== Commercialization of the VIPA ==
VIPA devices have been commercialized by LightMachinery as spectral disperser devices or components with various customized design parameters.
