= Polychromator =

A polychromator is an optical device that is used to disperse light into different directions to isolate parts of the spectrum of the light. A prism or diffraction grating can be used to disperse the light. Unlike a monochromator, it outputs multiple beams over a range of wavelengths simultaneously. Monochromators have one exit slit and one wavelength at a time can pass through that slit. Polychromators have multiple exit slits, each of which allows a different wavelength to pass through it. A detector is placed after each slit so that the light at each wavelength is measured by a different detector. Polychromators are often used in spectroscopy.

Spectrograph is a closely related term. Spectrographs generally do not make use of exit slits. Instead, they use a single spatially selective detector (such as photographic film or a charge-coupled device). Spectrographs are generally used to observe a continuous range of wavelengths, while polychromators are more commonly used to observe several discrete wavelengths, leaving gaps in-between.
