= Wadsworth constant deviation system =

In optics, Wadsworth's constant-deviation prism-mirror system (or Wadsworth constant deviation mounting) is a method to arrange a prism or diffraction grating and a mirror on a turntable to ensure that rays of light emerge in a fixed direction. Typically, light entering via a slit is directed into the prism by a lens. A particular wavelength can be chosen for analysis by setting the angle of the prism, and hence the part of the spectrum that exits by a mirror and lens combination. Rotating the prism through its entire range of motion enables the entire spectrum to be analyzed.

An analytical proof for the arrangement was given by Wadsworth, followed almost three decades later with a geometric proof by Gibbs and Collins. It is considered a "classic" prism configuration being versatile on its own or in combination with many other configuration and instrumentation combinations.

Among many other applications, Wadsworth constant deviation mountings have been used to study light emissions from excited metal atoms, and to study the light needs of plants in future space missions.
