= Blazed grating =

Type of diffraction grating

A blazed grating – also called echelette grating (from French échelle lit. 'ladder') – is a special type of diffraction grating. It is optimized to achieve maximum light efficiency in a given diffraction order. For this purpose, maximum optical power is concentrated in the desired diffraction order while the residual power in the other orders (particularly the zeroth) is minimized. Since this condition can only exactly be achieved for one wavelength, it is specified for which blaze wavelength the grating is optimized (or blazed). The direction in which maximum efficiency is achieved is called the blaze angle and is the third crucial characteristic of a blazed grating directly depending on blaze wavelength and diffraction order.

== Blaze angle ==
Like every optical grating, a blazed grating has a constant line spacing $d$, determining the magnitude of the wavelength splitting caused by the grating. The grating lines possess a triangular, sawtooth-shaped cross section, forming a step structure. The steps are tilted at the so-called blaze angle $\theta_B$ with respect to the grating surface. Accordingly, the angle between step normal and grating normal is $\theta_B$.

The blaze angle is optimized to maximize efficiency for the wavelength of the used light. Descriptively, this means $\theta_B$ is chosen such that the beam diffracted at the grating and the beam reflected at the steps are both deflected into the same direction. Commonly blazed gratings are manufactured in the so-called Littrow configuration.

== Littrow configuration ==
Diffraction at a blazed grating. The general case is shown with red rays; the Littrow configuration is shown with blue rays

The Littrow configuration is a special geometry in which the blaze angle is chosen such that diffraction angle and incidence angle are identical. For a reflection grating, this means that the diffracted beam is back-reflected into the direction of the incident beam (blue beam in picture). The beams are perpendicular to the step and therefore parallel to the step normal. Hence it holds in Littrow configuration $\alpha = \beta = \theta_B$. All other geometries yield anamorphic Littrow expansion or compression of the beam.

Diffraction angles at the grating are not influenced by the step structure. They are determined by the line spacing and can be calculated according to the in-plane version of the grating equation:

$$d \left( \sin{\alpha} + \sin{\beta} \right) = m \lambda$$

where:

$d$ = line spacing,
$\alpha$ = incidence angle,
$\beta$ = diffraction angle (angle taken in the same direction as $\alpha$, meaning the red $\beta$ would have a negative sign in the picture above if $\alpha$ is positive),
$m$ = diffraction order (taken to be positive for blazed orders),
$\lambda$ = wavelength of incident light.

For the Littrow configuration, this becomes $2 d \sin{\theta_B} = m \lambda$. By solving for $\theta_B$ the blaze angle can be calculated for arbitrary combinations of diffraction order, wavelength and line spacing:

$$\theta_B = \arcsin{\frac{m \lambda}{2d}} \ .$$

In a near-Littrow configuration, or another geometry that illuminates grating grooves with a facet angle $\theta_B$, the Fraunhofer diffraction equation yields $\beta = 2 \theta_B - \alpha$, similar to specular reflection from a tilted surface.

== Blazed transmission grating ==
Blazed gratings can also be realized as transmission gratings. In this case the blaze angle is chosen such that the angle of the desired diffraction order coincides with the angle of the beam refracted at the grating material.

== Echelle grating ==
A special form of a blazed grating is the echelle grating. It is characterized by particularly large blaze angle (>45°). Therefore, the light hits the short legs of the triangular grating lines instead of the long legs. Echelle gratings are mostly manufactured with larger line spacing but are optimized for higher diffraction orders.

Echelle gratings are useful in planet-finding astronomy, and are used on the successful HARPS and PARAS (PRL Advanced Radial-velocity All-sky Search) spectrograph.
