= Henry Joseph Grayson =

British-born Australian nurseryman and scientist

Henry Joseph Grayson (9 May 1856 – 21 March 1918) was a British-born Australian nurseryman and scientist, best known as the designer of a machine for ruling diffraction gratings.

Grayson was born in Worrall, near Sheffield, Yorkshire, England, son of Joseph Grayson, a Master Cutler, and his wife Fanny, née Smith. Grayson came of a family of market gardeners, and travelled to New Zealand in the early 1880s. After he returned to England and married Elizabeth Clare on 11 August 1886, the couple soon migrated to Victoria (Australia).

Grayson had by then succeeded in creating 120,000 diffractions lines to the inch (4,700 lines per mm). Grayson described his work on diffraction ruling in a report published for the Report of Meeting, Eighth Meeting of the Australasian Association for the Advancement of Science, held at Melbourne, Victoria in 1900:

The apparatus I first devised and used was exceedingly simple in principle, and consisted essentially of a fine steel screw and wedge of glass, the incline of the latter bearing some definite ratio to the pitch of the former. This glass wedge traveled along a bed, or base plate, also of glass, being kept in position by means of a slot cut along its surface. As the wedge was propelled forward by the screw it raised a vertical plate, accurately adjusted at right angles to the base plate, and as free as possible from movement other than that imparted to it by the wedge. To this vertical plate the slide, or disc to be ruled upon, was attached by means of a suitable cement. A platform for a sliding diamond carriage bridged the base-plate and wedge at a suitable height, being of course arranged transversely to and in front of the vertical slide.

Grayson died in 1918 in Clyde as a result of heart disease.
