= Balandin =

Balandin (masculine, Russian: Баландин) or Balandina (feminine, Russian: Баландина) is a Russian surname. Notable people with the surname include:

- Aleksei Balandin (1898–1967), Soviet chemist
- Aleksandr Nikolayevich Balandin (born 1953), Russian cosmonaut
- Aleksandr Balandin (born 1989), Russian Olympic gymnast
- Alexander A. Balandin, Russian electrical engineer
- Dmitriy Balandin (born 1995), Kazakh Olympic swimmer
- Lev Balandin (1934–1980), Russian swimmer
- Mikhail Balandin (1980–2011), Russian ice hockey player
