= Grism =

Optical element that reflects and diffracts light

Simplified working principle of grisms

A grism (also called a grating prism) is a combination of a prism and grating arranged so that light at a chosen central wavelength passes straight through. The advantage of this arrangement is that one and the same camera can be used for both imaging (without the grism) and spectroscopy (with the grism) without having to be moved. Grisms are inserted into a camera beam that is already collimated. They then create a dispersed spectrum centered on the object's location in the camera's field of view.

The resolution of a grism is proportional to the tangent of the wedge angle of the prism in much the same way as the resolutions of gratings are proportional to the angle between the input and the normal to the grating. The dispersed wavefront sensing system (as part of the NIRCam instrument) on the James Webb Space Telescope uses grisms. The system allows coarse optical path length matching between the different mirror segments.

== History ==
The grating prism was first described in 1973 by Ira Sprague Bowen and Arthur H. Vaughan Jr. in a paper explaining an experiment using a "non-objective grating" located in the convergent beam of a telescope, which allowed to significantly reduce its off-axis aberrations. In 1997, this instrument was patented by Chungte W. Chen and Ernest W. Gossett, with the name "grism", a portmanteau of "grating–prism".

== See also ==
- Diffraction grating
- Echelle grating
- Slitless spectroscopy
