= Brillouin spectroscopy =

Brillouin spectroscopy is an empirical spectroscopy technique which allows the determination of elastic moduli of materials. The technique uses inelastic scattering of light when it encounters acoustic phonons in a crystal, a process known as Brillouin scattering, to determine phonon energies and therefore interatomic potentials of a material. The scattering occurs when an electromagnetic wave interacts with a density wave, photon-phonon scattering.

This technique is commonly used to determine the elastic properties of materials in mineral physics and material science. Brillouin spectroscopy can be used to determine the complete elastic tensor of a given material which is required in order to understand the bulk elastic properties.

== Comparison with Raman spectroscopy ==
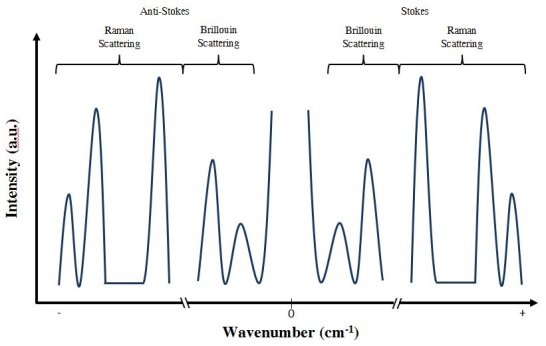
An illustration of an example Brillouin and Raman spectrum. In practice the distinction between Brillouin and Raman spectroscopy depends on which frequencies we choose to sample. Brillouin scattering generally lies within the GHz frequency regime.

Brillouin spectroscopy is similar to Raman spectroscopy in many ways; in fact the physical scattering processes involved are identical. However, the type of information gained is significantly different. The process observed in Raman spectroscopy, Raman scattering, primarily involves high frequency molecular vibrational modes. Information relating to modes of vibration, such as the six normal modes of vibration of the carbonate ion, (CO_{3})^{2−}, can be obtained through a Raman spectroscopy study shedding light on structure and chemical composition, whereas Brillouin scattering involves the scattering of photons by low frequency phonons providing information regarding elastic properties. Optical phonons and molecular vibrations measured in Raman spectroscopy typically have wavenumbers between 10 and 4000 cm^{−1}, while phonons involved in Brillouin scattering are on the order of 0.1–6 cm^{−1}. This roughly two order of magnitude difference becomes obvious when attempting to perform Raman spectroscopy vs. Brillouin spectroscopy experiments.

In Brillouin scattering, and similarly Raman scattering, both energy and momentum are conserved in the relations:

$$\hbar\Omega= \pm\hbar(\omega_i-\omega_s )$$

$$q = (k_t-k_s)$$

Where ω and k are the angular frequency and wavevector of the photon, respectively. While the phonon angular frequency and wavevector are Ω and q. The subscripts i and s denote the incident and scattered waves. The first equation is the result of the application of the conservation of energy to the system of the incident photon, the scattered photon, and the interacting phonon. Applying conservation of energy also sheds light upon the frequency regime in which Brillouin scattering occurs. The energy imparted on an incident photon from a phonon is relatively small, generally around 5-10% that of the photon's energy. Given an approximate frequency of visible light, ~10^{14} Hz, it is easy to see that Brillouin scattering generally lies in the GHz regime.

The second equation describes the application of conservation of momentum to the system. The phonon, which is either generated or annihilated, has a wavevector which is a linear combination of the incident and scattered wavevectors. This orientation will become more apparent and important when the orientation of the experimental setup is discussed.

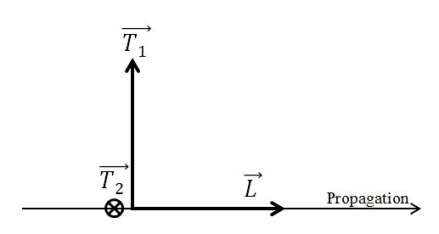
Geometric relationships between longitudinal, L, and transverse, T, acoustic waves.

The equations describe both the constructive (Stokes) and destructive (anti-Stokes) interactions between a photon and phonon. Stokes scattering describes the interaction scenario in which the material absorbs the photon, creating a phonon, inelastically emitting a photon with a lower energy than that of the absorbed photon. Anti-Stokes scattering describes the interaction scenario in which the incoming photon absorbs a phonon, phonon annihilation, and a photon with a higher energy than that of absorbed photon is emitted. The figure illustrates the differences between Raman scattering and Brillouin scattering along with Stokes and anti-Stokes interactions as is seen in experimental data.

The figure depicts three important details. The first is the Rayleigh line, the peak which has been suppressed at 0 cm^{−1}. This peak is a result of Rayleigh scattering, a form of elastic scattering from the incident photons and the sample. Rayleigh scattering occurs when the induced polarization of the atoms, resulting from the incident photons, does not couple with possible vibrational modes of the atoms. The resulting emitted radiation has the same energy as the incident radiation, meaning no frequency shift is observed. This peak is generally quite intense and is not of direct interest for Brillouin spectroscopy. In an experiment, the incident light is most often a high power laser. This results in a very intense Rayleigh peak which has the ability to wash out the Brillouin peaks of interest. In order to adjust for this, most spectrum are plotted with the Rayleigh peak either filtered out or suppressed.

The second noteworthy aspect of the figure is the distinction between Brillouin and Raman peaks. As previously mentioned, Brillouin peaks range from 0.1 cm^{−1} to approximately 6 cm^{−1} while Raman scattering wavenumbers ranges from 10 to 10000 cm^{−1}. As Brillouin and Raman spectroscopy probe two fundamentally different interaction regimes this is not too large of an inconvenience. The fact that Brillouin interactions are such low frequency however creates technical challenges when performing experiments for which a Fabry-Perot interferometer are usually used in order to overcome. A Raman spectroscopy system is generally less technically complicated and can be performed with a diffraction grating–based spectrometer. In some cases a single grating–based spectrometer has been used to collect both Brillouin and Raman spectra from a sample.

The figure also highlights the difference between Stokes and anti-Stokes scattering. Stokes scattering, positive photon creation, is displayed as a positive shift in wavenumber. Anti-Stokes scattering, negative photon annihilation, is displayed as a negative shift in wavenumber. The locations of peaks are symmetric about the Rayleigh line because they correspond to the same energy level transition but of a different sign.

In practice, six Brillouin lines of interest are generally seen in a Brillouin spectrum. Acoustic waves have three polarization directions one longitudinal and two transverse directions each being orthogonal to the others. Solids can be considered nearly incompressible, within an appropriate pressure regime, as a result, longitudinal waves, which are transmitted via compression parallel to the propagation direction, can transmit their energy through the material easily and thus travel quickly. The motion of transverse waves, on the other hand, is perpendicular to the propagation direction and is thus less easily propagated through the medium. As a result, longitudinal waves travel more quickly through solids than transverse waves. An example of this can be seen in quartz with an approximate acoustic longitudinal wave velocity of 5965 m/s and transverse wave velocity of 3750 m/s. Fluids cannot support transverse waves. As a result, transverse wave signals are not found in Brillouin spectra of fluids. The equation shows the relationship between acoustic wave velocity, V, angular frequency Ω, and phonon wavenumber, q.

$$V=\Omega /q$$

According to the equation, acoustic waves with varying speeds will appear on the Brillouin spectra with varying wavenumbers: faster waves with higher magnitude wavenumbers and slower waves with smaller wavenumbers. Therefore, three distinct Brillouin lines will be observable. In isotropic solids, the two transverse waves will be degenerate, as they will be traveling along elastically identical crystallographic planes. In non-isotropic solids the two transverse waves will be distinguishable from one another, but not distinguishable as being horizontally or vertically polarized without a deeper understanding of the material being studied. They are then generically labeled transverse 1 and transverse 2.

== Applications ==
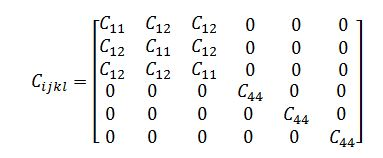
Cubic elastic tensor after symmetry reduction.

Brillouin spectroscopy is a valuable tool for determining the complete elastic tensor, $c_{ijkl}$, of solids. The elastic tensor is an 81 component 3x3x3x3 matrix which, through Hooke's law, relates stress and strain within a given material. The number of independent elastic constants found within the elastic tensor can be reduced through symmetry operations and depends on the symmetry of a given material ranging from 2 for non-crystalline substances or 3 for cubic crystals to 21 for systems with triclinic symmetry. The tensor is unique to given materials and thus must be independently determined for each material in order to understand their elastic properties. The elastic tensor is especially important to mineral physicist and seismologists looking to understand the bulk, polycrystalline, properties of deep Earth minerals. It is possible to determine elastic properties of materials such as the adiabatic bulk modulus, $K_s$, without first finding the complete elastic tensor through techniques such as the determination of an equation of state through a compression study. Elastic properties found in this way, however, do not scale well to bulk systems such as those found within rock assemblages in the Earth's mantle. In order to calculate the elastic properties of bulk material with randomly oriented crystals the elastic tensor is needed.

Using Equation 3, it is possible to determine the sound velocity through a material. In order to obtain the elastic tensor the Christoffel Equation needs to be applied:

$c_{ijkl} \Lambda_{kl}=\lambda_{kl} \delta_{kl} p_{kl}$

The Christoffel Equation is essentially an eigenvalue problem which relates the elastic tensor, $c_{ijkl}$, to the crystal orientation and the orientation of the incident light, $\Lambda_{kl}$, to a matrix, $\lambda_{kl}$, whose eigenvalues are equal to ρV2, where ρ is density and V is acoustic velocity. The polarization matrix, $p_{kl}$, contains the corresponding polarizations of the propagating waves.

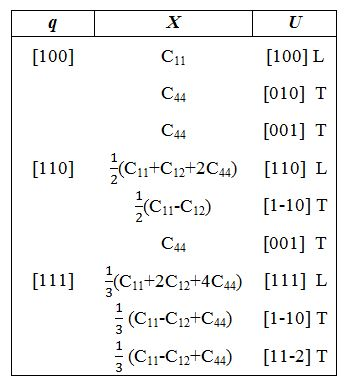
Relationships between elastic constants and X for cubic systems depending upon the direction of propagation of the phonon, q, and the eigenvector of the phonon, U, where L = longitudinal and T = transverse acoustic waves.

Using the equation, where $\Lambda_{kl}$ and $p_{ij}$ are known from the experimental setup and V is determined from the Brillouin spectra, it is possible to determine $c_{ijkl}$, given the density of the material.

For specific symmetries the relationship between a specific combination of elastic constants, X, and acoustic wave velocities, ρV2, have been determined and tabulated. For example, in a cubic system $c_{ijkl}$ reduces to 3 independent components. Equation 5 shows the complete elastic tensor for a cubic material. The relations between the elastic constants and can be found in Table 1.

In a cubic material it is possible to determine the complete elastic tensor from pure longitudinal and pure transverse phonon velocities. In order make the above calculations the phonon wavevector, q, must be pre-determined from the geometry of the experiment. There are three main Brillouin spectroscopy geometries: 90 degree scattering, backscattering, and platelet geometry.

== Frequency shift ==
The frequency shift of the incident laser light due to Brillouin scattering is given by

$$\Delta \omega = v_\text{s} \frac{2n\omega}{c} \sin \frac{\theta}{2}$$

where $\omega$ is the angular frequency of the light, $v_\text{s}$ is the velocity of acoustic waves (speed of sound in the medium), $n$ is the index of refraction, $c$ is the vacuum speed of light, and $\theta$ is the angle of incidence of the light.

== See also ==
- Brillouin scattering
- Raman spectroscopy
