= Diffraction efficiency =

Fraction of optical power diffracted by an optical element

In optics, diffraction efficiency is the performance of diffractive optical elements – especially diffraction gratings – in terms of power throughput. It's a measure of how much optical power is diffracted into a designated direction compared to the power incident onto the diffractive element of grating.

If the diffracted power is designated with P and the incident power with P_{0}, the efficiency η reads $\eta = \frac{P}{P_0} \ .$

== Grating efficiency ==
In the most common case – the diffraction efficiency of optical gratings (therefore also called grating efficiency) – there are two possibilities to specify efficiency:

- The absolute efficiency is defined as above and relates the power diffracted into a particular order to the incident power.
- The relative efficiency relates the power diffracted into a particular order to the power that would be reflected by a mirror of the same coating as the grating, therefore attributing to inevitable reflection losses at the grating but not caused by inefficient diffraction itself.
