= Alexander A. Balandin =

American electrical engineer

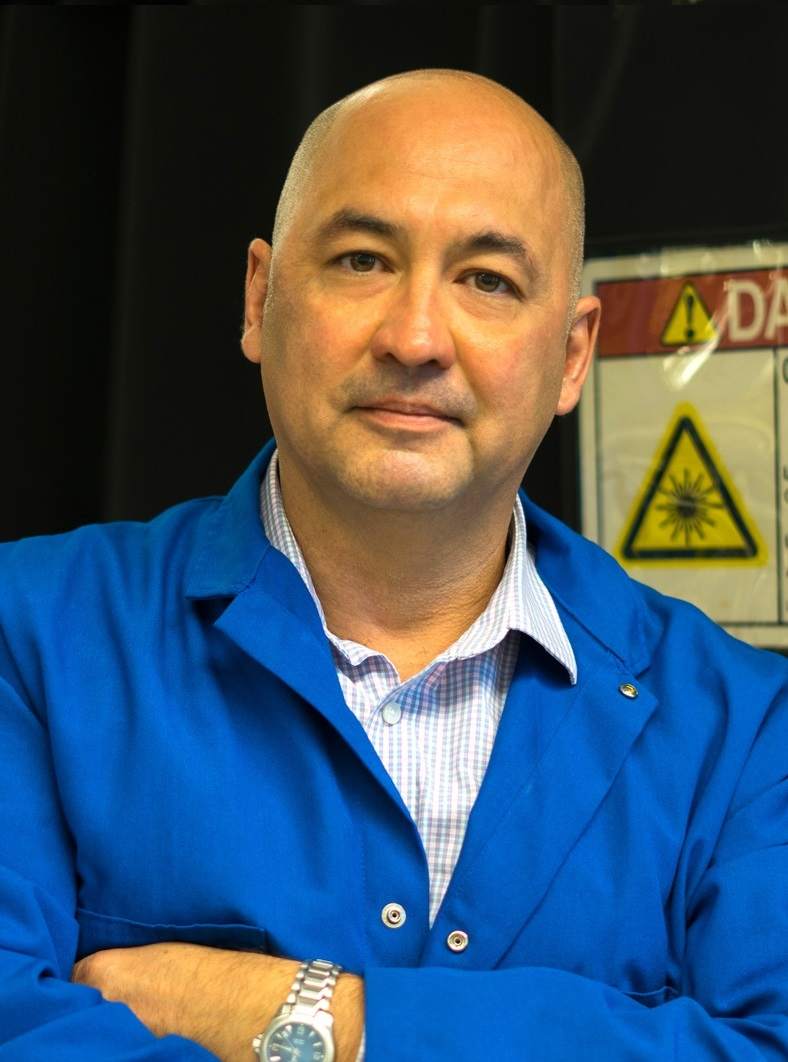
- Born: Nizhniy Novgorod, Russia
- Education: University of Notre Dame; Moscow Institute of Physics and Technology
- Awards: MRS Medal for the discovery of unique thermal properties of graphene; IEEE Pioneer Award in Nanotechnology for phonon engineering research; Brillouin Medal for investigation of phonons in graphene
- Scientific career
- Fields: Nanotechnology, low-dimensional materials, phonon engineering, thermal transport, electronic noise, Raman spectroscopy, Brillouin spectroscopy
- Workplaces: University of California, Los Angeles; University of California, Riverside; Moscow Institute of Physics and Technology
- Website: balandin-group.ucla.edu

Alexander A. Balandin is an American electrical engineer. He was elected as a fellow of the American Physical Society in 2011.

== Research ==
Balandin was among the pioneers of the field of phononics and phonon engineering. In 1998, Balandin published an influential paper on the effects of phonon spatial confinement on thermal conductivity of nanostructures, where the term “phonon engineering” appeared for the first time in a journal publication. In this work, he proposed theoretically a new physical mechanism for reduction of thermal conductivity due to the changes in the phonon group velocity and density of states induced by spatial confinement. The theoretically predicted changes in the acoustic phonon spectrum in individual nanostructures were later confirmed experimentally. Phonon engineering has applications in electronics, thermal management, and thermoelectric energy conversion.

In 2008, Balandin conducted pioneering research of thermal conductivity of graphene. In order to perform the first measurement of thermal properties of graphene, Balandin invented a new optothermal experiment technique based on Raman spectroscopy. He and his coworkers explained theoretically why the intrinsic thermal conductivity of graphene can be higher than that of bulk graphite, and demonstrated experimentally the evolution of heat conduction when the system dimensionality changes from 2D (graphene) to 3D (graphite). The Balandin optothermal technique for measuring the thermal conductivity was adopted by many laboratories worldwide, and extended, with various modifications and improvements, to a range of other 2D materials. Balandin's contributions to graphene field go beyond graphene thermal properties and thermal management applications. His research group conducted detailed studies of low-frequency electronic noise in graphene devices; demonstrated graphene selective sensors, which do not rely on surface functionalization; and graphene logic gates and circuits, which do not require electronic band-gap in graphene.

Balandin made a number of important contributions to the field of low-frequency electronic noise, also known as 1/f noise. His early work in the 1/f noise field included investigation of noise sources in GaN materials and devices, which led to a substantial reduction in the noise level in such type of devices made of wide band-gap semiconductors. In 2008, he started the investigation of electronic noise in graphene and other 2D materials. The main results of his research included understanding the mechanism of the 1/f noise in graphene, which is different from that in conventional semiconductors or metals; the use of few-layer graphene to address the century-old problem of surface vs. volume noise origin; understanding unusual effects of irradiation on noise in graphene, which revealed a possibility of noise reduction in graphene after irradiation.

Balandin's work helped in the rebirth of the charge density wave (CDW) research field. The early work on CDW effects was performed with bulk samples, which have quasi-1D crystal structures of strongly-bound 1D atomic chains that are weakly bound together by van der Waals forces. The rebirth of the CDW field has been associated, from one side, with the interest in layered quasi-2D van der Waals materials and, from another side, with the realization that some of these materials reveal CDW effects at room temperature and above. Balandin group demonstrated the first CDW device operating at room temperature. Balandin and co-workers used original low-frequency noise spectroscopy to monitor phase transitions in 2D CDW quantum materials, demonstrated the extreme radiation hardness of CDW devices and proposed a number of transistor-less logic circuits implemented with CDW devices.
