= Optical axis grating =

Optical axis gratings (OAGs) are gratings of optical axis of a birefringent material. In OAGs, the birefringence of the material is constant, while the direction of optical axis is periodically modulated in a fixed direction. In this way they are different from the regular phase gratings, in which the refractive index is modulated and the direction of the optical axis is constant.

The optical axis in OAGs can be modulated in either transverse or the longitudinal direction, which causes it to act as a diffractive or a reflective component. Numerous modulation profiles allow variation in the optical properties of the OAGs.

== Examples ==
The optical axis in a transverse or cycloidal OAG is monotonously modulated in transverse direction. This grating is capable of diffracting all incident light into either +1st or −1st order in a micrometer-thick layer . Cycloidal OAGs have already been proven to be very efficient in beam steering and optical switching.

In another type of OAG, the optical axis is modulated in the direction of light propagation with a modulation period equal to a fraction of the wavelength (200–3000 nm). This modulation prevents these frequencies from propagating within the grating, acting as a band-stop filter. As a result, any light with frequency within the matching range will be reflected from the OAG. However, unlike cholesterics which reflect only one of two circular polarizations of incident light, this OAG reflects any polarization.

== Applications ==
Optical axis gratings can be implemented in various materials, including liquid crystals, polymers, birefringent crystals, magnetic crystals and subwavelength gratings. This new type of grating has broad potential in imaging, liquid crystal display, communication, and numerous military applications.

== See also ==
- Diffraction grating
- Liquid crystal
