= Echelle grating =

Type of diffraction grating used in spectrometers

Echelle spectrometer: the first standard grating is optimized for a single lower order, while multiple higher orders of the echelle have an optimized output intensity. Both diffractive elements are mounted orthogonally in such a way that the highly illuminated orders of the echelle are transversally separated. Since only parts of the full spectrum of each individual order lie in the illuminated region, only portions of the different orders overlap spectrally (i.e. green line in red portion).

An echelle grating (from French échelle, meaning "ladder") is a type of diffraction grating characterised by a relatively low groove density, but a groove shape optimized for use at high incidence angles and therefore in high diffraction orders. Higher diffraction orders provide increased dispersion (spacing) of spectral features at the detector, enabling increased differentiation of these features. Echelle gratings, like other types of diffraction gratings, are used in spectrometers and similar instruments. They are most useful in cross-dispersed high-resolution spectrographs, such as HARPS, PARAS, and numerous other astronomical instruments.

== History ==
The concept of a coarsely ruled grating used at grazing angles was discovered by Albert Michelson in 1898, where he referred to it as an "echelon". However, it was not until 1923 that echelle spectrometers began to take on their characteristic form, in which the high-resolution grating is used in tandem with a crossed low-dispersion grating. This configuration was invented by Nagaoka and Mishima and has been used in a similar layout ever since.

== Principle ==
As with other diffraction gratings, the echelle grating conceptually consists of a number of slits with widths close to the wavelength of the diffracted light. The light of a single wavelength in a standard grating at normal incidence is diffracted to the central zero order and successive higher orders at specific angles, defined by the grating density/wavelength ratio and the selected order. The angular spacing between higher orders monotonically decreases, and higher orders can get very close to each other, while lower ones are well separated. The intensity of the diffraction pattern can be altered by tilting the grating. With reflective gratings (where the holes are replaced by a highly reflective surface), the reflective portion can be tilted (blazed) to scatter a majority of the light into the preferred direction of interest (and into a specific diffraction order). For multiple wavelengths, the same is true; however, in that case it is possible for longer wavelengths of a higher order to overlap with the next order(s) of a shorter wavelength, which is usually an unwanted side effect.

In echelle gratings, however, this behavior is deliberately used, and the blaze is optimized for multiple overlapping higher orders. Since this overlap is not directly useful, a second, perpendicularly mounted dispersive element (grating or prism) is inserted as an "order separator" or "cross disperser" into the beam path. Hence the spectrum consists of stripes with different, but slightly overlapping, wavelength ranges that run across the imaging plane in an oblique pattern. It is exactly this behavior that helps to overcome imaging problems with broadband, high-resolution spectroscopic devices, as in the utilisation of extremely long, linear detection arrays, or strong defocus or other aberrations, and makes the use of readily available 2D detection arrays feasible, which reduces measurement times and improves efficiency.

== See also ==
- Diffraction grating
- Grism

== Literature ==
- Thomas Eversberg, Klaus Vollmann: Spectroscopic Instrumentation - Fundamentals and Guidelines for Astronomers. Springer, Heidelberg 2014, ISBN 3662445344
