= Regional Meteorological Centre, Chennai =

Research institute in Chennai

- RMC-Chennai
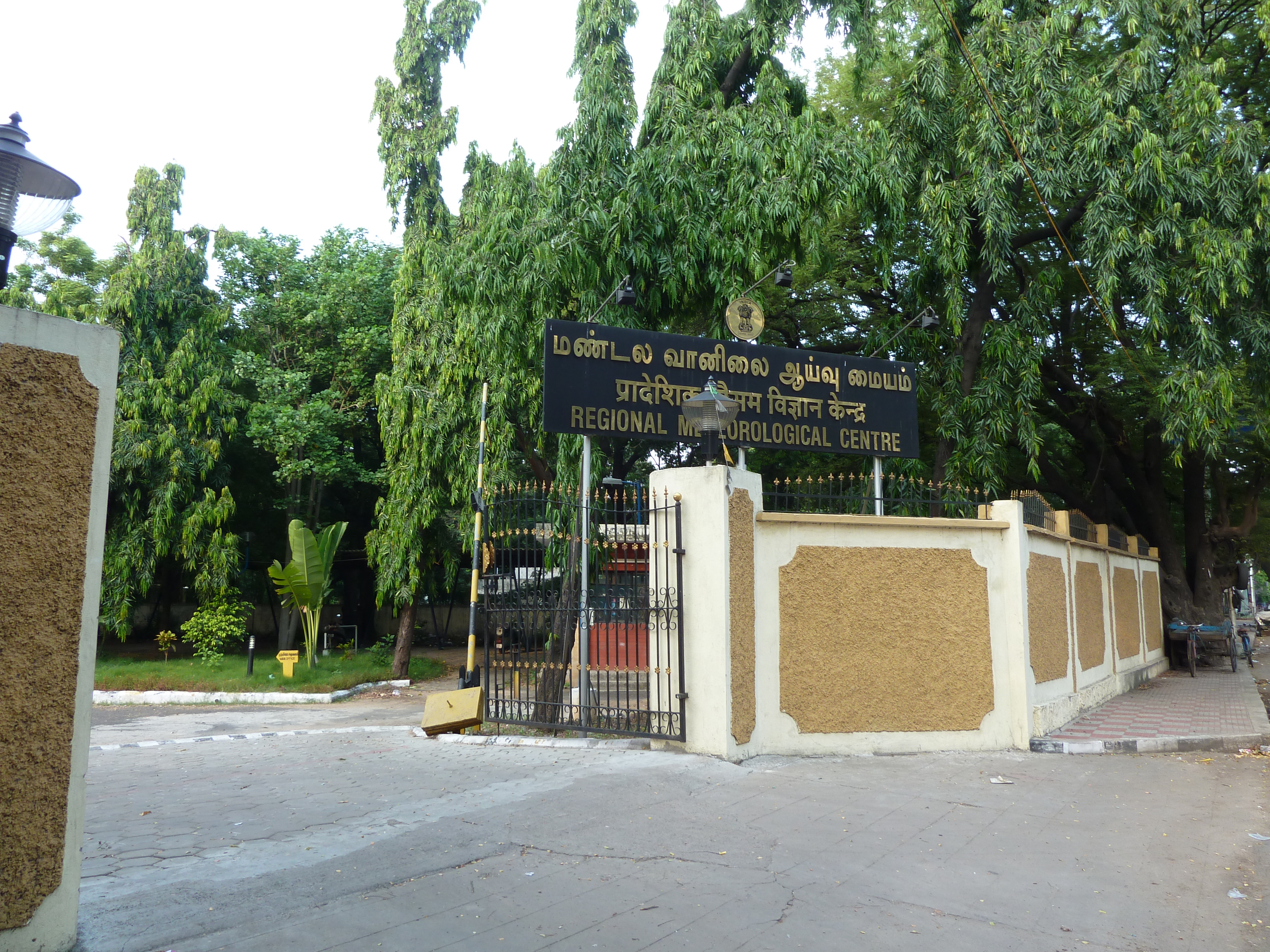
- Regional Metrological Centre, Chennai

Agency overview
- Formed: 1786 (240 years ago)
- Jurisdiction: Government of India
- Status: Operational
- Headquarters: New Delhi; 13°4′7.3″N 80°14′48.33″E
- Agency executive: S. Balachandran, DDGM (Scientist 'F')
- Parent department: IMD
- Parent agency: IMD
- Child agency: Meteorological centres at Hyderabad, Bangalore and Thiruvananthapuram
- Website: RMC-Chennai

Regional Meteorological Centre, Chennai is one of the six regional meteorological centres (RMCs) of the India Meteorological Department (IMD) and is responsible for the weather-related activities of the southern Indian peninsula comprising the states of Andhra Pradesh, Telangana, Karnataka, Kerala, Tamil Nadu and the union territories of Andaman and Nicobar, Lakshadweep Islands and Puducherry. The other regional centres are located at Kolkata, Guwahati, Mumbai, Nagpur and New Delhi.

Established in the later part of the 18th century, the Chennai meteorological centre is considered one of the first modern astronomical-cum-meteorological observatory in the East beyond Europe, way before the establishment of the Indian Meteorological Department in 1875. it was Established by William Petrie at Madras.

== History ==
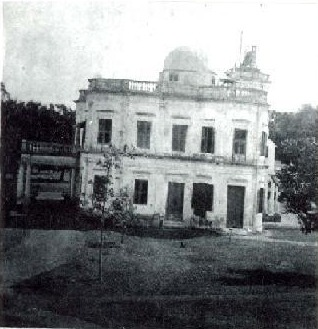
Madras Observatory in 1880

Systematic meteorological observations in Chennai started much earlier than the actual establishment of the India Meteorological Department in 1875. The city is home to one of the first modern astronomical and meteorological observatory in the East, established at Egmore before 1792. The Madras Observatory, as it was known then, was established by Sir Charles Oakeley, the then Governor of Madras under the East India Company, in 1792 "for promoting the knowledge of Astronomy, Geography and Navigation in India", marking the beginning of the history of Regional Meteorological Centre, Chennai. Oakeley was supported by William Petrie, a member of the Madras Government, who had built an astronomical observatory at his own expense 5 years earlier in 1786. The primary purpose of the observatory was to spread astronomy among the masses, rather than weather observation.

For over a century, it was the only astronomical observatory in India that exclusively worked on the stars. Among the astronomers at the observatory were Norman Robert Pogson, Michael Topping and John Goldingham. By 1899, it had been relegated to gathering weather-related data.

The 15-feet tall granite pillar monument weighing 10 tons, which carried the original transit equipment, is still preserved and carries the name of the architect, Michael Topping Arch, and the year AD MDCCXCII. Inscriptions in Tamil and Telugu were carved on the pillar in order that "posterity may be informed a thousand years hence of the period when the mathematical sciences were first planted by British liberality in Asia". J. Goldingham, FRS, became the first astronomer of the observatory, who started recording the meteorological observations in 1796.

In 1840, Captain S. O. E. Ludlow began recording meteorological observations on an hourly basis. In 1855, William Stephen Jacob of the East India Observatory in Madras found orbital anomalies in the binary star 70 Ophiuchi that he claimed are evidence of an extrasolar planet—the first exoplanet false alarm. The "discovery" began a 140-year period of other exoplanet discovery false alarms, although no actual planets were discovered.

From 1861, N. R. Pogson held the post of astronomer of the observatory for 30 years. He also held the post of meteorological reporter to the Madras government for many years, who was assisted in his work by his wife and daughter.

In 1875, the India Meteorological Department, also known as the Met Office, was established at New Delhi, which is the chief body of national meteorological service in India and is the principal government agency in all matters relating to meteorology, seismology and allied subjects. The same year, daily weather reports started coming out at the Madras observatory. When the observatory moved to Kodaikanal, astronomical observations ceased at the Madras observatory, which was then used only for weather forecast.

In 1899, R. L. Jones, a professor of physics at the Madras Presidency College, was appointed as part-time meteorologist of the observatory. The post was abolished in 1926 and a full-time assistant meteorologist was appointed. The observatory, which was issuing the Madras Daily Weather Report since October 1893 and supplying the time signal throughout the Indian Telegraph system, was reduced to the status of an ordinary pilot balloon observatory in 1931.

The Regional Meteorological Centre at Chennai was established on 1 April 1945 under a deputy director general of the India Meteorological Department to supervise and co-ordinate meteorological services in the Southern region of India, which covers the states of Tamil Nadu, Andhra Pradesh, Karnataka, Kerala and Union Territories of Puducherry and Lakshadweep. With the formation of the Regional Meteorological Centre, the storm-warning work for the seaports on the east coast of India from Kalingapatnam southwards was transferred to Chennai's Meenambakkam centre in 1945. The meteorological activities were bifurcated into marine and aviation for efficient functioning of the storm-warning services and separate storm-warning centre was established at Nungambakkam in 1969. The responsibility of storm-warning task for the ports on the west coast of India from Karwar southwards too was transferred from Mumbai to Chennai in 1969.

== Functions ==
The Regional Meteorological Centre, Chennai is located at 50 (New No. 6) College Road, Nungambakkam, between Good Shepherd School and Women's Christian College. The three meteorological centres in South India function at Hyderabad, Bangalore and Thiruvananthapuram serving the states of Andhra Pradesh, Karnataka, and Kerala, respectively, under the technical and administrative control of the Regional Meteorological Centre, Chennai.

With the establishment of the additional cyclone-warning centres at Bhubaneshwar and Visakhapatnam, the storm-warning centres at Kolkata, Chennai and Mumbai were named as Area Cyclone-Warning Centres (ACWC) and the storm-warning centres at Visakhapatnam, Bhubaneshwar and Ahmedabad as Cyclone-Warning Centres (CWC). CWCs at Visakhapatnam, Bhubaneshwar and Ahmedabad function under the control of the ACWCs at Chennai, Kolkata and Mumbai, respectively. The ACWC supervises and coordinates the non-aviation forecasting work at the meteorological centres functioning under it.

=== Aviation ===
Data from the Chennai Doppler weather radar is currently being used by the Chennai airport. The aviation weather forecasting activities, which are required by pilots and airport authorities, are controlled and coordinated by the Aerodrome Meteorological Office at Chennai Airport in Meenambakkam.

=== Seismology and hydrology ===
Under RMC Chennai, conventional seismological observatories are functioning at Thiruvananthapuram, Visakhapatnam, Vijayawada, Minicoy and Salem. In 1997, seismological observatories were established at Chennai, Thiruvananthapuram and Visakhapatnam under Global Seismological Network (GSN). In addition, an observatory under World Wide Standardised Seismological Network (WWSSN) functions at Kodaikanal and a broadband system functions at Mangalore.

The hydrology section at RMC Chennai periodically inspects about 2,000 rain gauge stations maintained by organisations such as railways and state governments.

=== Public forecasts and warnings ===
Two of the Cyclone Detection Radars in the ACWC network.

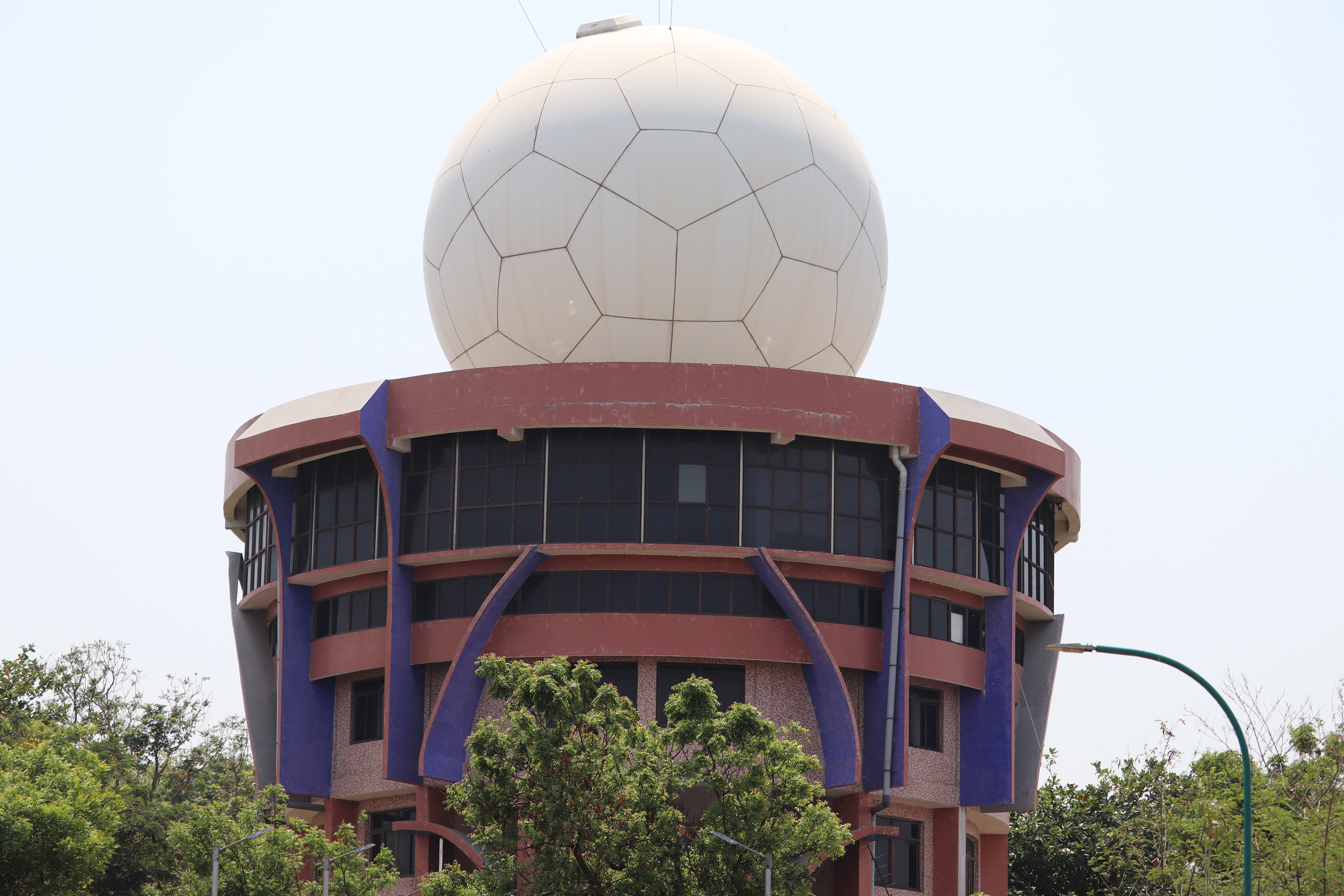
Vishakhapatnam

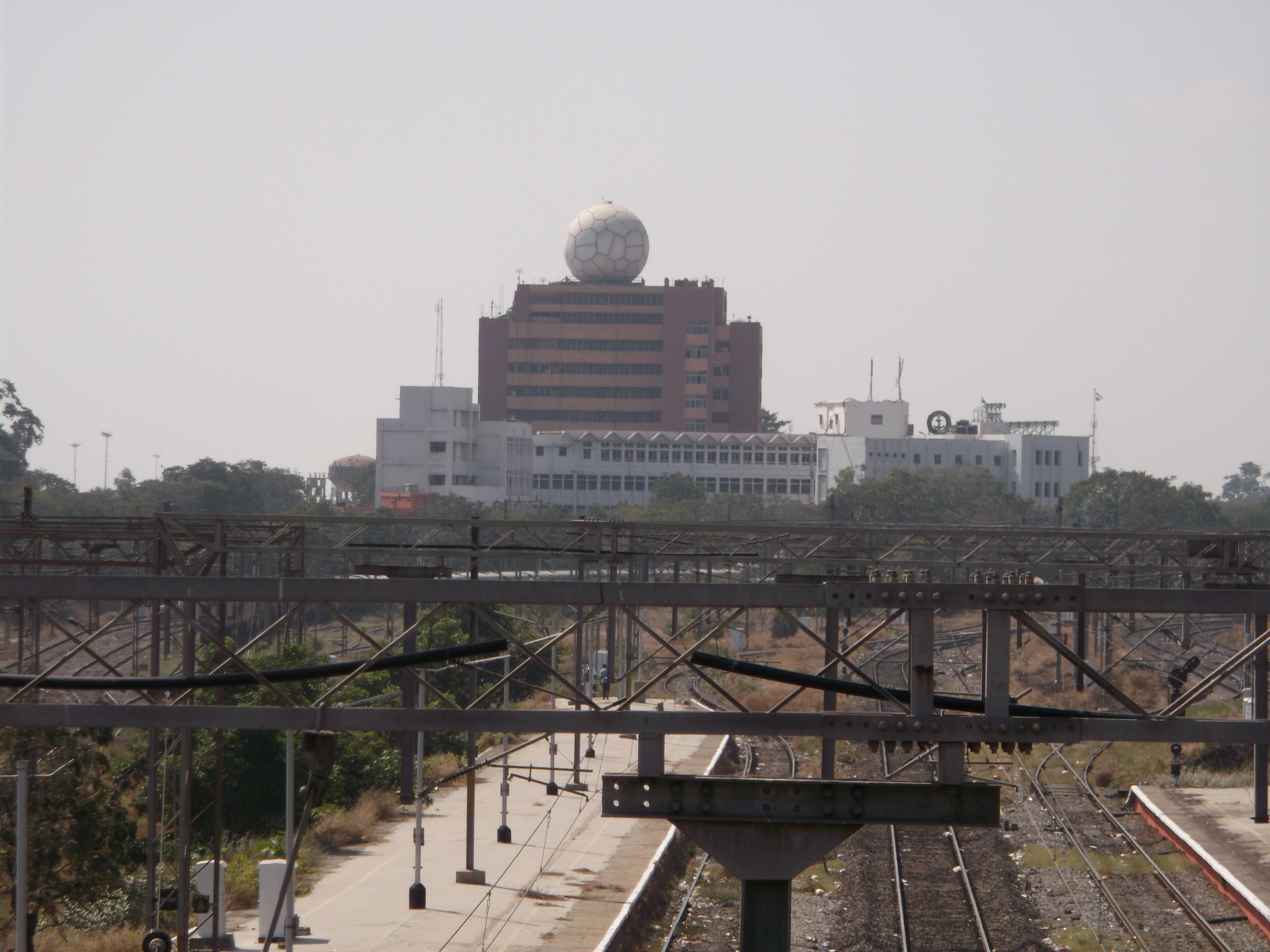
Chennai

The non-aviation forecasting work, including cyclone warnings, is supervised and co-ordinated by the ACWC at Regional Meteorological Centre, Chennai, by means of the Cyclone Detection Radar. The Cyclone Detection Radars are located at Chennai, Machilipatnam, Vishakhapatnam, Karaikal and Kochi which track tropical cyclones over the Bay of Bengal and the Arabian Sea. The cyclone warning bulletins are disseminated to remote centres in the coastal districts from the Cyclone Warning Dissemination System (CWDS) unit in Regional Meteorological Centre, Chennai.

The Regional Meteorological Centre and other Meteorological Centres periodically inspects the observatories to ensure the accuracy of meteorological observations and all the instruments at the observatories are calibrated at least once in 2 years. The Cyclone Detection Radar Station in Chennai is located at the Port Trust Building of the Chennai Port.

Since 1978, Agromet Advisory Units are functioning at RMC Chennai and other meteorological centres under it. These units regularly issue Agromet Advisory Bulletins twice a week benefiting the farming community in their respective states.

In 2018, the IMD revealed its plan to provide tailor-made weather forecasts for various sectors including agriculture, health, railways, power, and tourism. Specialised weather forecasts provided by the RMC could help in planning operations in the respective sectors and taking contingency measures during emergencies.

=== Observation ===
The Regional Meteorological Centre, Chennai maintains 121 surface observatories of which 53 are departmental observatories and 68 are part-time observatories. In addition, it maintains 13 pilot balloon observatories, 10 Rawin stations and 1 Radiosonde station. There are also Port Meteorological offices at Chennai, Kochi and Visakhapatnam, which interact with masters of ships and shipping companies and other marine interests.

=== Staff ===
More than 1,400 personnel including 300 officers work in various offices under Regional Meteorological Centre, Chennai which includes 3 meteorological centres, 1 area cyclone warning centre, 1 cyclone warning centre, 6 cyclone detection radar stations and 17 aviation meteorological offices (AMOs).

The IMD also maintains Voluntary Observing Fleet (VOF) through the Port Meteorological Office at the Chennai Port comprising ships of merchant navy, Indian Navy and foreign agencies.

In 1984, a training unit was started at RMC Chennai to conduct basic meteorological training courses, each course spanning 4 months. More than 1,000 trainees have been trained so far in about 50 batches.

== Additional services ==
The Regional Meteorological Centre, Chennai also issues Farmers' Weather Bulletin, a bulletin on weather-based agro-advisory services for the Cauvery delta zone in Tamil Nadu. This information is available both in English and Tamil on Tuesdays and Fridays based on the weather forecast received from the centre.

== Developments ==
In June 1995, High-Resolution Picture Transmission (HRPT) direct readout ground station was established at RMC Chennai. This receives AVHRR satellite imageries and TOVS data from polar-orbiting NOAA satellites.

The IMD has plans to replace its S-band 10 cm Cyclone Detection Radar (CDR) network with modern Doppler weather radars (DWRs) in a phased manner. Although the decision to set up the DWR network was taken in the 1990s and funds allocated, the first DWR units are being installed only in the 2000s. Two DWRs, METEOR-1500S, imported from Gematronik Gmbh, a German firm, at a cost of ₹ 130 million each, have been installed at the Regional Meteorological Centres in Chennai and Kolkata. The Chennai DWR is operational since 2001–2002. In the same period, a High Wind Speed Recorder (HWSR) was installed at the Chennai centre.

In 2003–2004, a laser ceilometer was installed at Chennai airport for reporting data on height of base of low cloud for aviation. During the same period, automatic message switching systems was also installed at the Chennai International Airport. Chennai is one of the five state-of-the-art regional message switching centres connected with the central hub in IMD's National Meteorological Telecommunication Centre (NMTC) at New Delhi. Other regional systems are located at Delhi, Kolkata, Mumbai and Guwahati.

The city's first automatic weather station was installed at the RMC in Nungambakkam in 2007. As part of its ₹ 9,200-million modernisation plan, the Department of Meteorology plans to install Doppler Weather Radar in Chennai. At present, data from the manual observatory in Meenambakkam is being used for forecasting weather. The Regional Meteorological Centre, Chennai will install an automatic weather unit at Meenambakkam in 2011 as part of its modernisation project, which aims to improve weather monitoring facilities. The department set up two more in the suburbs of Madhavaram and Ennore recently. With the new automated weather stations to be installed, the state of Tamil Nadu would have 42 such facilities.

At present, the staff of Meteorological Department and of other government agencies such as Water Resources Department, manually measure the rainfall in facilities set up in some parts of the city. For the first time in the city, the department would create a mesoscale network of satellite-based automated rain gauges to cover areas within the radius of 5 km. In the first phase, 10 such facilities would be installed in various localities of the city. The localities where such rain gauges are to come up are Chembarambakkam, Avadi, Kolapakkam, Puzhal, Anna University, Taramani, Pallikaranai and Tambaram. The department is in the process of selecting one more site.

In March 2012, following Delhi and Mumbai, RMC Chennai started installing ten 50-feet automatic rain gauge (ARG) stations to provide location-specific weather data. Equipped to measure humidity, rainfall and temperature, they will help make accurate forecasts, specifying the rainfall variability. Hourly data from the ARG stations are transmitted to a geostationary satellite, which re-transmits the data, which help to validate the measurements from the Doppler weather radar, to the receiving earth station at Pune. The ARGs are run on solar power. The first one was installed in Sholinganallur followed by Taramani, Anna University, Hindustan University, LMOIS Kolapakkam, Poonamallee, Chembarambakkam, Puzhal, Kattupakkam and Avadi.

== See also ==
- India Meteorological Department
- World Meteorological Organization
