= John Goldingham =

British astronomer in India (1767–1849)

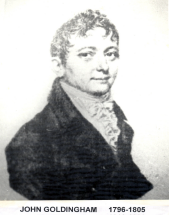
John Goldingham

John Goldingham FRS (1767 - July 1849) was the first official astronomer of the Madras Observatory, appointed in 1802. Goldingham was also an architect and surveyor who headed the Madras Survey School which later grew into the Guindy Engineering College and then Anna University. Born in London in 1767, Goldingham was first in the service of William Petrie at his private observatory and then hired by astronomer-sailor Michael Topping as his assistant in 1788.

John Goldingham was a Dane. His original name was Johannes Guldenheim. He succeeded Michael Topping as the Astronomer posted in Madras. Goldingham was put in charge of building an observatory in 1792, and later appointed as the Presidency Civil Engineer in 1800. Although a mathematician, he managed to learn both astronomy and engineering. He worked at around the same time as Colonel Lambton began the Trigonometrical Survey.

From 1787 observations were made on the eclipses of Jupiter's satellites. Using the time taken for these, the longitudes were established. Goldingham estimated the Madras observatory at 18°17'21" E and these were used for a while by the Trigonometrical Survey. Goldingham was succeeded by T. G. Taylor in 1831.

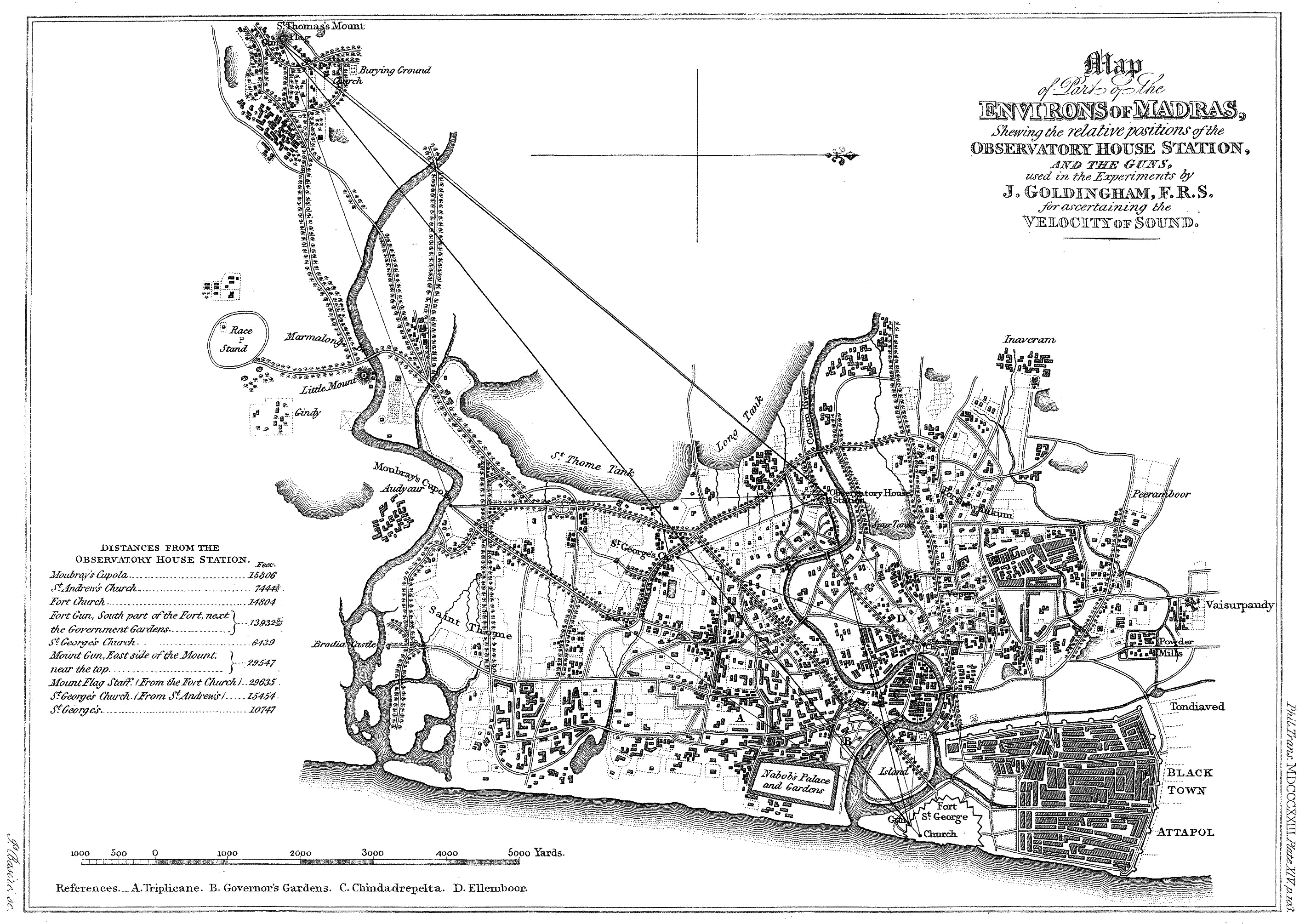
Map of Madras in Goldingham's experiment to find the velocity of sound in 1823

On April 20, 1796, he married Maria Louisa Popham, niece of Admiral Sir Home Riggs Popham, at St. Mary's in Fort St. George. They had two sons. In 1815 he married Ann Baxter and they had a son and two daughters.

In 1802, Goldingham formulated the Madras time which was 5 hours and 21 minutes ahead of GMT thus establishing the closest precedent to Indian Standard Time adopted a century later in 1906. In 1800, he designed the Banqueting Hall (now Rajaji Hall), for which he was granted a commission of 15% on all bills. After the Board of Directors found that Goldingham had drawn 22,500 pagodas as commission on the 180,000 spent on the work until September 1801, the commission was suspended.

He then returned to his work as Government Astronomer, in the course of which he published two volumes of observations: one of them contains his observations on the length of the pendulum, the velocity of sound, of meteorological phenomena, as well as determinations of the longitude of Madras, and a discussion of the longitudes of the three Presidencies.

He retired back to England, where he died at Worcester, in July 1849. He was a Fellow of the Royal Society, the Royal Geographical Society, and the Royal Astronomical Society.

== Publications ==
- Observations for Ascertaining the Length of the Pendulum at Madras in the East Indies, Latitude 134'19".1 N. with the Conclusions drawn from the Same. Philosophical Transactions of the Royal Society 112 (1822): 127–70.
- A Method of Rectifying a Route Protraction. Journal of the Asiatic Society of Bengal 1 (1832): 19–20.
- Of the Difference of Longitudes found by Chronometer, and by correspondent Eclipses of the Satellites of Jupiter, with some supplementary Information relative to Madras, Bombay, and Canton; as also the Latitude and Longitude of Point de Galle and the Friar's Hood. Philosophical Transactions of the Royal Society 112 (1822): 431–36.
- Of the Geographical Situation of the Three Presidencies, Calcutta, Madras, and Bombay, in the East Indies. Philosophical Transactions of the Royal Society 112 (1822): 408–30.
- Madras Observatory Papers. Madras: College Press, 1827.
