= Thomas Jefferson Jackson See =

American astronomer

T. J. J. See
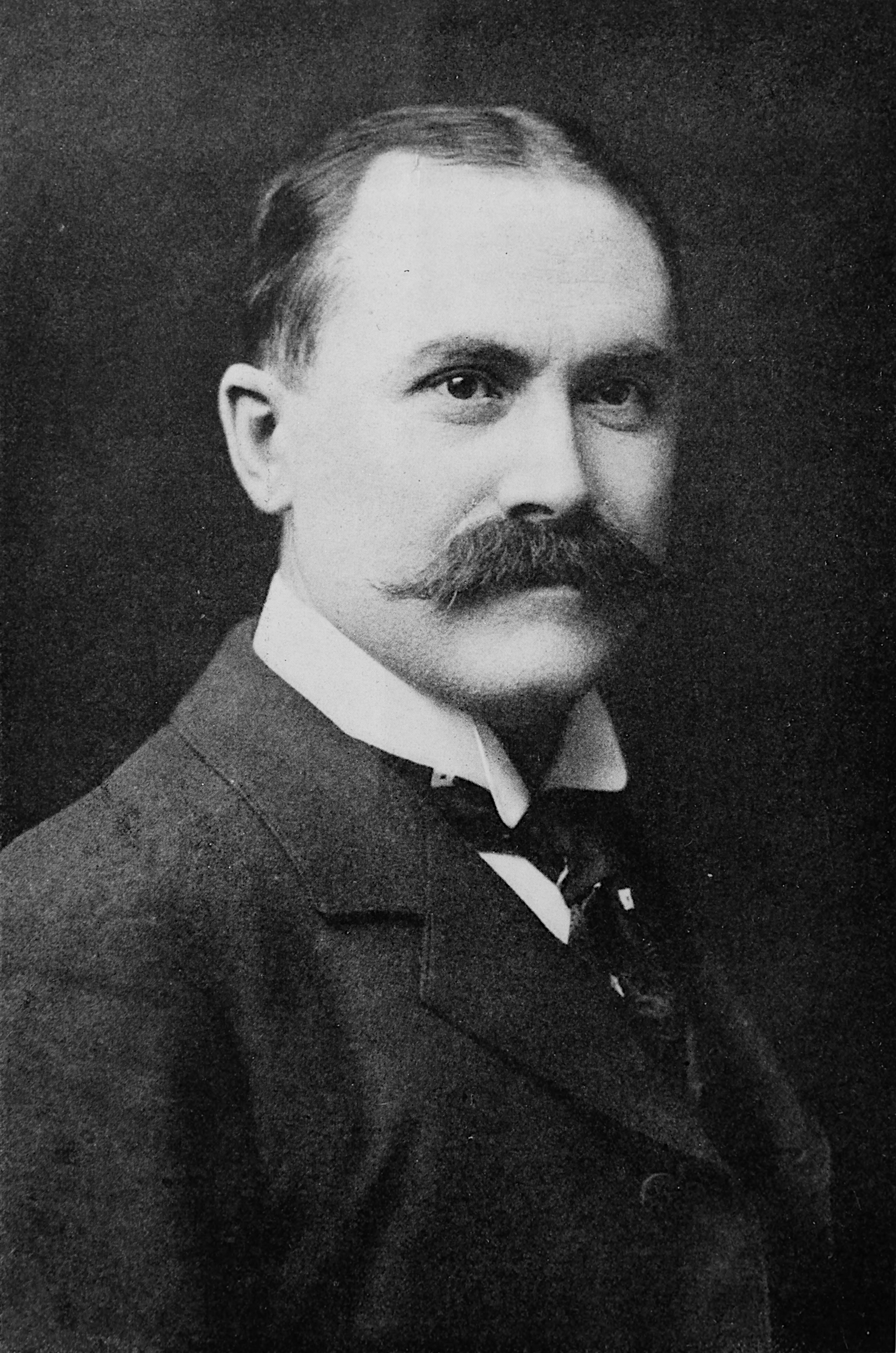
- Portrait of T. J. J. See
- Born: February 19, 1866; Montgomery City, Missouri
- Died: July 4, 1962 (aged 96); Oak Knoll Naval Hospital, Oakland, California
- Education: University of Missouri
- Scientific career
- Fields: Astronomy and Mathematics
- Workplaces: Instructor, Department of Astronomy, University of Chicago, Chicago, Ill., Astronomer, Lowell Observatory, Flagstaff, Ariz., Astronomer to Naval Observatory, Mare Island, Calif.

Thomas Jefferson Jackson (T. J. J.) See (February 19, 1866 – July 4, 1962) was an American astronomer whose promulgated theories in astronomy and physics were eventually disproven. His educational and professional careers were dogged by plagiarism and conflict, including his attacks on relativity. He was fired from his position at two observatories, eventually serving out his professional years at a naval shipyard in California. He died in July 1962.

== Early life ==
See was born near Montgomery City, Missouri. He attended the University of Missouri, graduating in 1889 with an undergraduate career that was outwardly stellar. He achieved honors distinction in nearly every subject, became his class valedictorian and was the recipient of the Laws Astronomical Medal for an original thesis on an astronomical subject. However, his speech "The Spirit of the Age" was a plagiarized version of an earlier speech given by another student, and his "original thesis" for the Laws Astronomical Medal was claimed to be original work but was just from prior work by Sir George Darwin. See was also a critical player in the academic insurgency aimed at ousting university president Samuel Laws (in favor of See's mentor William Benjamin Smith). This plagiarism and bitter in-fighting "set the scene for a career perhaps unrivalled as an example of wasted talent". Nevertheless, with outwardly strong credentials, See went to the University of Berlin where he received a PhD in mathematics in 1892. With a European doctorate, See returned to America with enviable credentials and a career of great promise.

== Scientific work ==
It was at the Naval Observatory that some of See's previous work, and his arrogance, led to his downfall. Several years earlier, in 1895, while studying the well known binary star 70 Ophiuchi at the University of Chicago (and from a few observations made at the Leander McCormick Observatory of the University of Virginia during a visit in April 1895), See believed he had found small anomalies in the motion of one of the stars suggesting a third object was present and its gravitational influence was affecting the motion of the star (William Stephen Jacob had mentioned this possibility in an earlier study in 1855). See's results were published in the Astronomical Journal. See was elected to the American Philosophical Society in 1897. In 1899, Forest R. Moulton analyzed this proposed triple system and demonstrated convincingly that it would be unstable, and therefore very unlikely to actually exist (Moulton also pointed out that an orbit not requiring an unseen companion had been put forth by Eric Doolittle). See took great offense and wrote an abusive letter to the Astronomical Journal. An edited version was published and he was banned from future publication in the Astronomical Journal. See found himself increasingly at odds with other astronomers, and eventually suffered a breakdown in 1902. He spent one semester teaching at the United States Naval Academy, but was then transferred to a naval shipyard at Mare Island, California in charge of the time station, until his retirement in 1930.

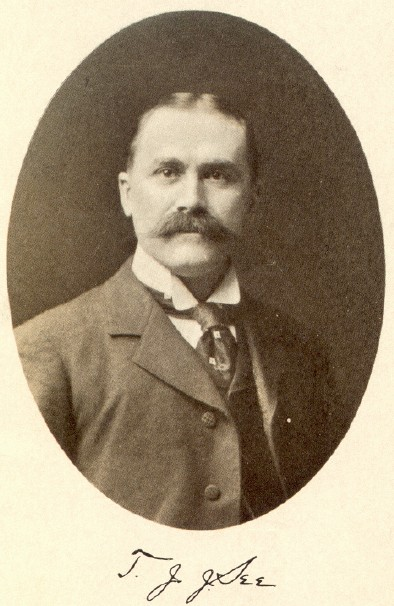
Thomas Jefferson Jackson See

See is notorious as the primary modern proponent of the idea that various ancient observers report the color of the bright star Sirius to be red as a result of stellar evolution. The Red-Sirius controversy arises because modern observations show that Sirius is white in color, and the very strong realization from modern astronomers that a reddish color for Sirius in antiquity is essentially impossible by any mechanism of astrophysics. See published six papers from 1892 to 1926 on the topic, making shrill attacks on critics, and ignoring the substantial numbers of texts from antiquity that described Sirius as blue or white in color. See's obsession with what is now considered as a fringe area (whose solution involves only cultural allusions) only served to further distance the maverick from mainstream astronomy.

== Selected writings ==
- See, T. J. J. (1896). "Researches on the orbit of 70 Ophiuchi, and on a periodic perturbation in the motion of the system arising from the action of an unseen body". The Astronomical Journal. 16: 17–23. Bibcode:1896AJ.....16...17S. doi:10.1086/102368.
- See, T. J. J. (1899). "Remarks on Mr. Moulton's paper in A.J. 461". The Astronomical Journal. 20: 56. Bibcode:1899AJ.....20...56S. doi:10.1086/103115.
- See, T. J. J. 1896, "Researches on the evolution of the stellar systems: v. 1. On the universality of the law of gravitation and on the orbits and general characteristics of binary stars." T.P. Nichols (Lynn, Mass.)
- See, T. J. J. 1910, "Researches on the evolution of the stellar systems: v. 2. The capture theory of cosmical evolution, founded on dynamical principles and illustrated by phenomena observed in the spiral nebulae, the planetary system, the double and multiple stars and clusters and the star-clouds of the Milky Way." T.P. Nichols (Lynn, Mass.)
- See, T. J. J. 1920, Astronomische Nachrichten, 211, 49: "New Theory of the Aether"
- See, T. J. J. 1917, Electrodynamic Wave-Theory of Physical Forces, vol. I
- See, T. J. J. 1922, Electrodynamic Wave-Theory of Physical Forces, vol. II
- See, T. J. J. 1925, Naval Observatory, Researches in Non-Euclidian Geometry and the Theory of Relativity: A Systematic Study of Twenty Fallacies in the Geometry of Riemann, Including the So-called Curvature of Space and Radius of World Curvature, and of Eighty Errors in the Physical Theories of Einstein and Eddington, Showing the Complete Collapse of the Theory of Relativity
