= Sangharsh =

Sangharsh, Sangharsha, Sunghursh, Sangharshana or Sangarsh may refer to:

- Sunghursh, a 1968 Indian Hindi-language film
- Sangharshana, a 1983 Indian film
- Sangharsha (1993 film), a 1993 Indian film by Sunil Kumar Desai
- Sangharsha (1995 film), a 1995 Indian Bengali-language political action film by Haranath Chakraborty
- Sangharsh (1999 film), an Indian psychological crime thriller film by Tanuja Chandra
- Sangharsha, a 2007 Indian film
- Sangarshana (2011) or Poraali, a 2011 Indian film
- Sangharsh (2014 film), an Indian Marathi-language road drama film
- Sangharsh (2018 film), a 2018 Indian Bhojpuri-language film
- Sangharshana (2024 film), a 2024 Indian film
- Chennakesava Reddy, a 2002 Indian Telugu-language film by V. V. Vinayak, released in Hindi as Sangharsh: The Struggle
- Sangharsh (TV series) or Dil Se Dil Tak, a 2017 Hindi drama television series
- Sangarsh, Indian musical contest
- Sangarsha (TV series), Indian television series
