= India Meteorological Department =

Meteorological agency of the Government of India

- Location of IMD headquarters in New Delhi
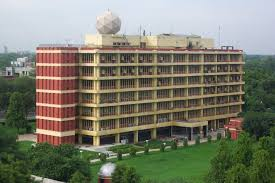
- Mausam Bhawan, headquarters of the India Meteorological Department, New Delhi

Agency overview
- Formed: 15 January 1875; 151 years ago
- Type: Government agency
- Jurisdiction: Government of India
- Headquarters: Mausam Bhawan, Lodi Road, New Delhi, India; 28°35′24″N 77°13′12″E
- Annual budget: ₹128,290.16 crore (US$14 billion) (2025–26 total net allocation)
- Ministers responsible: Dr. Jitendra Singh, Union Minister of State (I/C) for Earth Sciences; Dr. M. Ravichandran, Secretary, Ministry of Earth Sciences
- Agency executive: Mrutyunjay Mohapatra, Director General of Meteorology
- Parent department: Ministry of Earth Sciences
- Website: mausam.imd.gov.in

India Meteorological Department (IMD) is an agency of the Ministry of Earth Sciences of the Government of India. It is the principal agency responsible for meteorological observations, weather forecasting and seismology. IMD is headquartered in Delhi and operates hundreds of observation stations across India and Antarctica. Regional offices are at Chennai, Mumbai, Kolkata, Nagpur, Guwahati and New Delhi.

IMD is also one of the six Regional Specialised Meteorological Centres of the World Meteorological Organisation. It has the responsibility for forecasting, naming and distribution of warnings for tropical cyclones in the Northern Indian Ocean region, including the Malacca Straits, the Bay of Bengal, the Arabian Sea and the Persian Gulf.

== History ==
In 1686, Edmond Halley published his treatise on the Indian summer monsoon, which he attributed to a seasonal reversal of winds due to the differential heating of the Asian landmass and the Indian Ocean. The first meteorological observatories were established in India by the British East India Company. These included the Calcutta Observatory in 1785, the Madras Observatory in 1796 and the Colaba Observatory in 1826. Several other observatories were established in India during the first half of the 19th century by various provincial governments.

The Asiatic Society, founded in Calcutta in 1784 and in Bombay in 1804, promoted the study of meteorology in India. Henry Piddington published almost 40 papers dealing with tropical storms from Calcutta between 1835 and 1855 in The Journal of the Asiatic Society. He also coined the term cyclone, meaning the coil of a snake. In 1842, he published his landmark thesis, Laws of the Storms.

After a tropical cyclone hit Calcutta in 1864, and the subsequent famines in 1866 and 1873 due to the failure of the monsoons, it was decided to organise the collection and analysis of meteorological observations under one roof. As a result, the India Meteorology Department was established on 15 January 1875. Henry Francis Blanford was appointed the first Meteorological Reporter of the IMD. In May 1889, Sir John Eliot was appointed the first Director General of Observatories in the erstwhile capital, Calcutta. The IMD headquarters were later shifted to Shimla in 1905, then to Pune in 1928 and finally to New Delhi in 1944.

IMD became a member of the World Meteorological Organisation after independence on 27 April 1949. The agency has gained in prominence due to the significance of the monsoon rains on Indian agriculture. It plays a vital role in preparing the annual monsoon forecast, as well as in tracking the progress of the monsoon across India every season.

== Organisation ==
The IMD is headed by the Director General of Meteorology, currently Mrutyunjay Mohapatra. IMD has six Regional Meteorological Centres, each under a Deputy Director General. These are located in Chennai, Guwahati, Kolkata, Mumbai, Nagpur and New Delhi. There is also a Meteorological Centre in each state capital. Other IMD units such as Forecasting Offices, Agrometeorological Advisory Service Centers, Hydro-meteorological Office, Flood Meteorological Offices, Area Cyclone Warning Centers and Cyclone Warning Centers are usually co-located with various observatories or meteorological center.

IMD operates a network of hundreds of surface and glacial observatories, Upper Air (high altitude) stations, ozone and radiation observatories and meteorological radar stations. Additional data is received from India's constellation of satellites, such as Kalpana-1, Megha-Tropiques and instruments on board the IRS series and the INSAT series of satellites. Data and observations are also reported into the IMD network from meteorological instruments on board Indian merchant navy and Indian Navy ships. IMD was the first organisation in India to deploy a message switching computer for supporting its global data exchange.

IMD collaborates with other agencies such as the Indian Institute of Tropical Meteorology, National Centre for Medium Range Weather Forecasting and the National Institute of Ocean Technology.

IMD also operates seismic monitoring centres at key locations for earthquake monitoring and measurements.

== Tasks ==
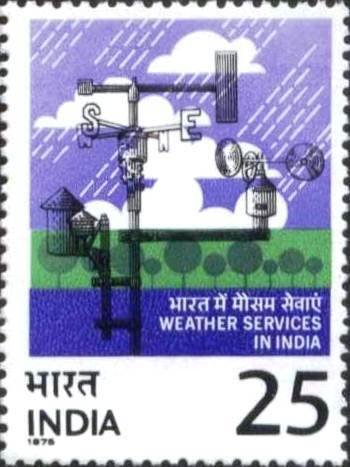
Centenary of the Indian Meteorological Department, 1975

IMD undertakes observations, communications, forecasting and weather services. In collaboration with the Indian Space Research Organisation, the IMD also uses the IRS series and the Indian National Satellite System (INSAT) for weather monitoring of the Indian subcontinent. IMD was first weather bureau of a developing country to develop and maintain its own satellite system.

IMD is one of the six worldwide Regional Specialised Meteorological Centres of the Tropical Cyclone Programme of the World Weather Watch of the World Meteorological Organization. It is regional nodal agency for forecasting, naming and disseminating warnings about tropical cyclone in the Indian Ocean north of the Equator.

== New initiatives ==
The IMD launched System of Aerosol Monitoring and Research (SAMAR) in January 2016 to study the concentration of Black carbon, radiative properties of aerosols, environmental visibility and their climatological impacts. It would contain a network of 16 aethalometers, 12 sky radiometers and 12 nephelometers.
