= Rajaji Hall =

Building in India

Coordinates: 13.069378°N 80.274916°E

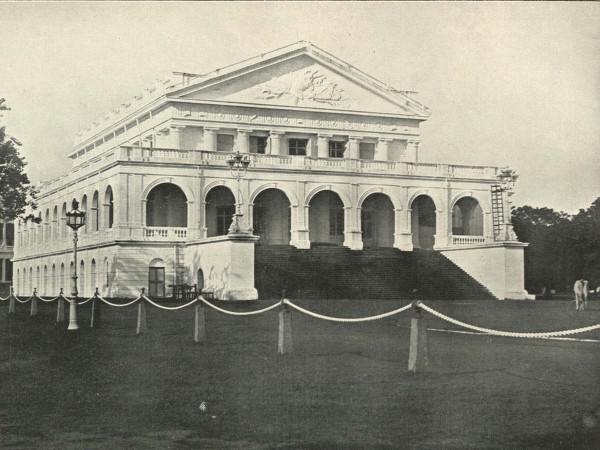
The Banqueting Hall, c. 1905

Rajaji Hall, previously known as the Banqueting Hall, Madras, is a public hall in the city of Chennai, India used for social functions. The hall was built by John Goldingham to commemorate the British victory over Tipu Sultan in the Fourth Anglo-Mysore War.

== History ==
The Banqueting Hall was constructed between 1800 and 1802 by John Goldingham, an astronomer and engineer with the British East India Company. The building was commissioned by Edward Clive, the then Governor of Madras, who envisaged the hall to be an extension of the Government House which was being renovated that year. The hall was built to commemorate the company's victory over Tipu Sultan in the Fourth Anglo-Mysore War and designed to be a venue for social functions. The construction of the hall cost about two and a half lakh rupees. The building was opened with a grand ball on 7 October 1802.

From 1875 onwards, the hall was extensively renovated and expanded. In 1895, a colonnaded terrace was constructed and a verandah was built around it. The convocations of the University of Madras were held in the Banqueting Hall from 1857 till 1879 when the Senate House was constructed. During 27 January 1938 – 26 October 1939, the legislature of the Madras Presidency met here. The hall was renamed as "Rajaji Hall" after India's independence (in honour of C. Rajagopalachari). On 19 February 1961, Queen Elizabeth II celebrated the first birthday of her second son, Prince Andrew, by cutting a cake gifted by the then Chief Minister of Madras State Kamaraj at a reception held in her honour at Rajaji Hall in Madras. The mortal remains of important political leaders lay in state in Rajaji Hall before their funeral. At present, it houses the offices of the Tamil Nadu State Raffle. The dead bodies of former chief ministers of Tamil Nadu, C. N. Annadurai, M. G. Ramachandran, J. Jayalalithaa and M. Karunanidhi were kept here for public view.

The Government House and Gandhi Illam were demolished during the construction of a new Tamil Nadu legislative assembly-secretariat complex between 2008 and 2010, apparently causing irreparable damage to the hall's foundations.

== Structure ==
Rajaji Hall was built in the form of a Greek temple and is believed to have been modelled after the Parthenon in Athens. It is built on a basement of arched cellars and store rooms and is surrounded by a colonnaded terrace. The exterior of the hall is constructed in the 16th-century Italian Manneristic style. The building is 120 feet long, 65 feet wide and 40 feet high and is enclosed by a gallery which had portraits of popular Anglo-Indian leaders and administrators including Edward Clive, Richard Wellesley, Sir Eyre Coote, Sir Thomas Munro, Lord Hobart and Lord Harris and British monarchs George III and Queen Charlotte. The southern end was connected to the Government House by an array of steps. Sten Nilsson describes the hall as resembling "a Heroum, a neo-classical temple for hero worship".
