= V. S. Mahalingam =

Indian scientist

- Education: B.E. M. Tech
- Alma mater: College of Engineering, Guindy; IIT Kanpur
- Employer: DRDO
- Known for: Defence research
- Title: Director, Centre for Artificial Intelligence and Robotics(CAIR)

V. S. Mahalingam is an Indian DRDO scientist and Director of Centre for Artificial Intelligence and Robotics. He is an alumnus of Chennai's College of Engineering, Guindy.
