= Chennai Port Trust Centenary Building =

Building in Chennai, India

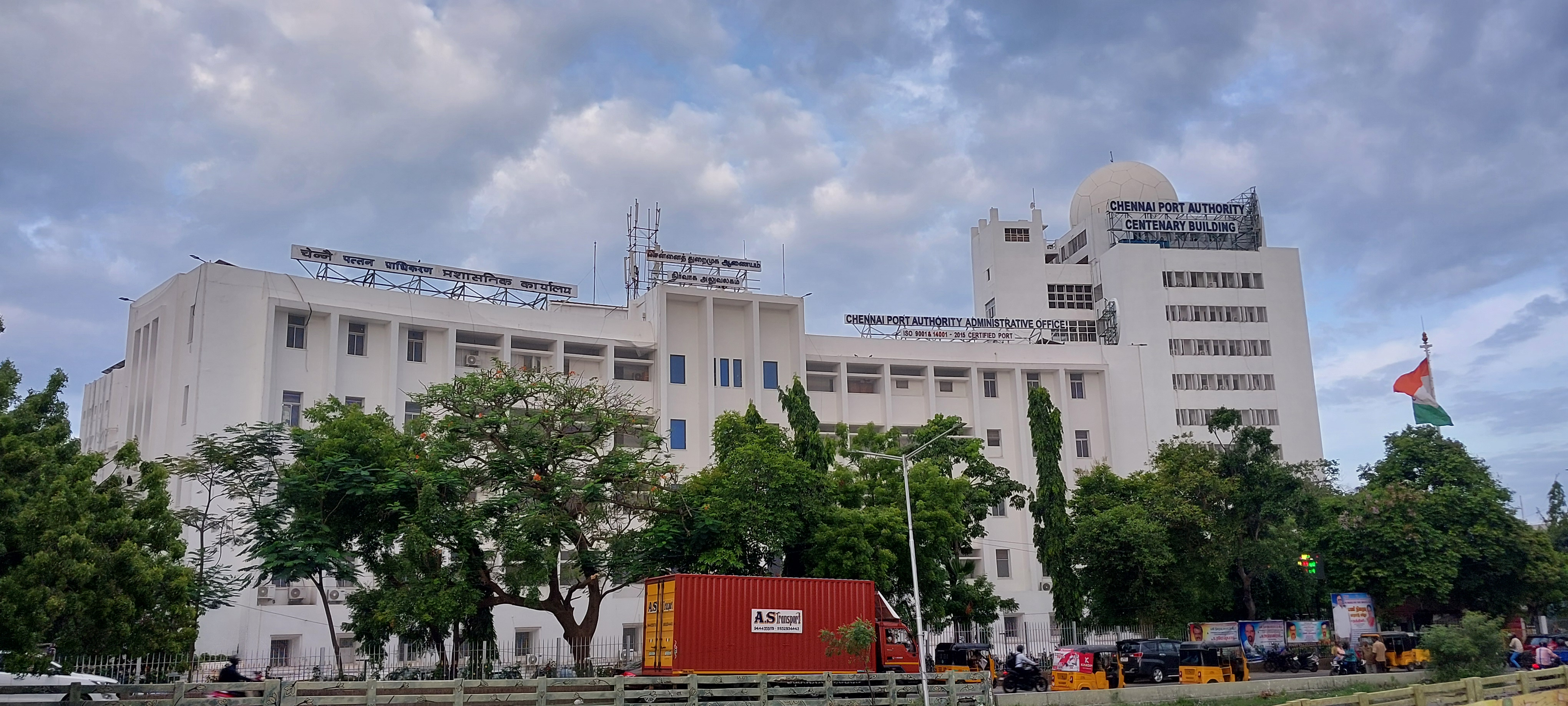
- Centenary Building, Chennai Port Trust, as seen from Chennai Beach Station
- Interactive map of the Chennai Port Trust Centenary Building area

General information
- Type: Commercial office
- Architectural style: Modernism
- Location: Rajaji Salai, Chennai, India, 1 Rajaji Salai, Chennai, Tamil Nadu 600 001, India
- Coordinates: 13°5′2″N 80°17′23″E
- Owner: Chennai Port Trust

Height
- Top floor: 47.7 m (156 ft)

Technical details
- Floor count: 12

Chennai Port Trust Centenary Building is a 12-storied building in Chennai, India, serving as the chief administrative building of the Chennai Port Trust. The Port Met Office of the Regional Meteorological Centre also functions from this building and the cyclone detection radar is situated atop the building contained in a giant football-like mascot structure, which serves as a prominent landmark in the harbour area.

== Location ==
The Centenary Building is located opposite to the Reserve Bank of India Building at Fort Glacis near Fort St. George. The nearest railway stations are the Chennai Beach and Chennai Fort, both located within a distance of half a kilometre.

== Cyclone detection radar ==
The "radome" or the radar's dome is located atop the building at nearly 53 m above sea level. Weighing 18 tonnes, the radar continuously scans the atmosphere within the radius of nearly 500 km and provides an overview of active weather systems. The office of the Doppler Weather Radar Station is situated on the 10th floor of the building.

The radar was installed on 21 February 2002. The radar was developed by Bharat Electronics Limited and is used by Indian Air Force and Army. This is the first radar to have been installed in India facing the sea on one side and the land on the other. The data captured by the radar have been used to warn the region of the cyclonic storms forming in the Bay of Bengal and the thunderstorms on the surface. Data from the Doppler weather radar are currently being used by the Chennai airport. The data on wind speed and wind direction are transmitted almost every 10 min, providing information necessary for landing and takeoff of aircraft.

Till 2011, the radar had tracked seven cyclones and three depressions formed over the Bay of Bengal, including Nisha (November 2008), Laila (May 2010), Jal (November 2010) and Thane (December 2011).

The radar converts nearly 750 kilowatt power into electromagnetic radiation for tracking weather systems. The radar is capable of detecting the spatial variability and rainfall intensity across Chennai and neighbouring districts and can also track the movement of clouds and predict rainfall in another area.

The Department of Meteorology is planning for "nowcasting," a short-term forecasting where weather is predicted for the next one to three hours, using the potential of the radar to track rainfall in various parts of the region.

== See also ==
- List of tallest buildings in Chennai
