= College of Engineering, Guindy =

Engineering college in Chennai, India

Coordinates: 13.010979°N 80.235426°E

- Seal of College of Engineering, Guindy
- Motto: Labor omnia vincit (Latin)
- Motto in English: Work conquers all
- Type: Public, Autonomous
- Established: 17 May 1794; 232 years ago
- Founder: Michael Topping
- Affiliations: Anna University
- Dean: K. S. Easwarakumar
- Location: Chennai, Tamil Nadu, 600025, India
- Campus: Urban
- Colours: Brick Red
- Website: ceg.annauniv.edu

The College of Engineering, Guindy (CEG) is a public engineering college situated in Chennai, India. It is Asia's oldest technical institution, founded in 1794. It is also the oldest technical institution to be established outside Europe.

== History ==
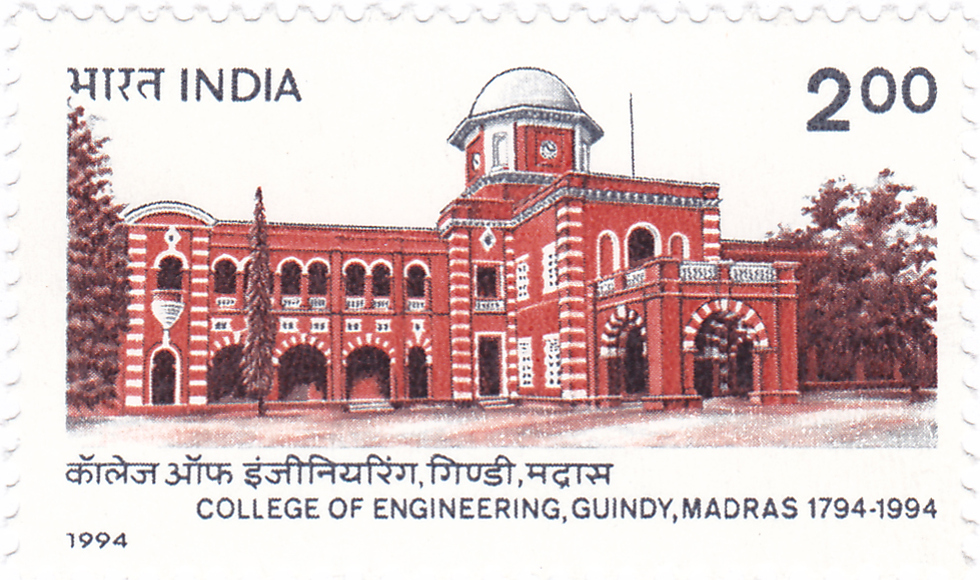
A 1994 stamp dedicated to the 200th anniversary of the College of Engineering

A growing need for surveyors to work for the East India Company led to the "School of Survey" being established in a building near Fort St. George, at the suggestion of Michael Topping, in 1794. This school was one of the first of its kind in the country and it started out with 8 students. It became the Civil Engineering School in 1858 and was renamed College of Engineering in 1859, with the inclusion of a mechanical engineering course. The college was shifted for a short period to Kalasa Mahal, Chepauk, before settling at its present location in 1920 as College of Engineering, Guindy.

College of Engineering, Guindy was one of the first institutes in India to offer degrees in mechanical engineering, civil engineering, electrical engineering, telecommunication, highway engineering, printing technology, and materials science and engineering.

In 1978, College of Engineering, Guindy became a constituent college and the principal seat of Anna University.

Since 2019 the four flagship campuses of Anna University including the College of Engineering, Guindy were recommended to be recognized as an Institute of Eminence by the University Grants Commission of India. However, the Government of Tamil Nadu has rejected the Central Government's offer for fear of loss of the quota of reservations for candidates from backward caste (BC), most backward caste (MBC) backgrounds. The Vice-Chancellor of the university, M. K. Surappa, along with the alumni body of the institution were in favour of attaining the recognition as an Institute of Eminence.

== Campus ==
=== Location ===
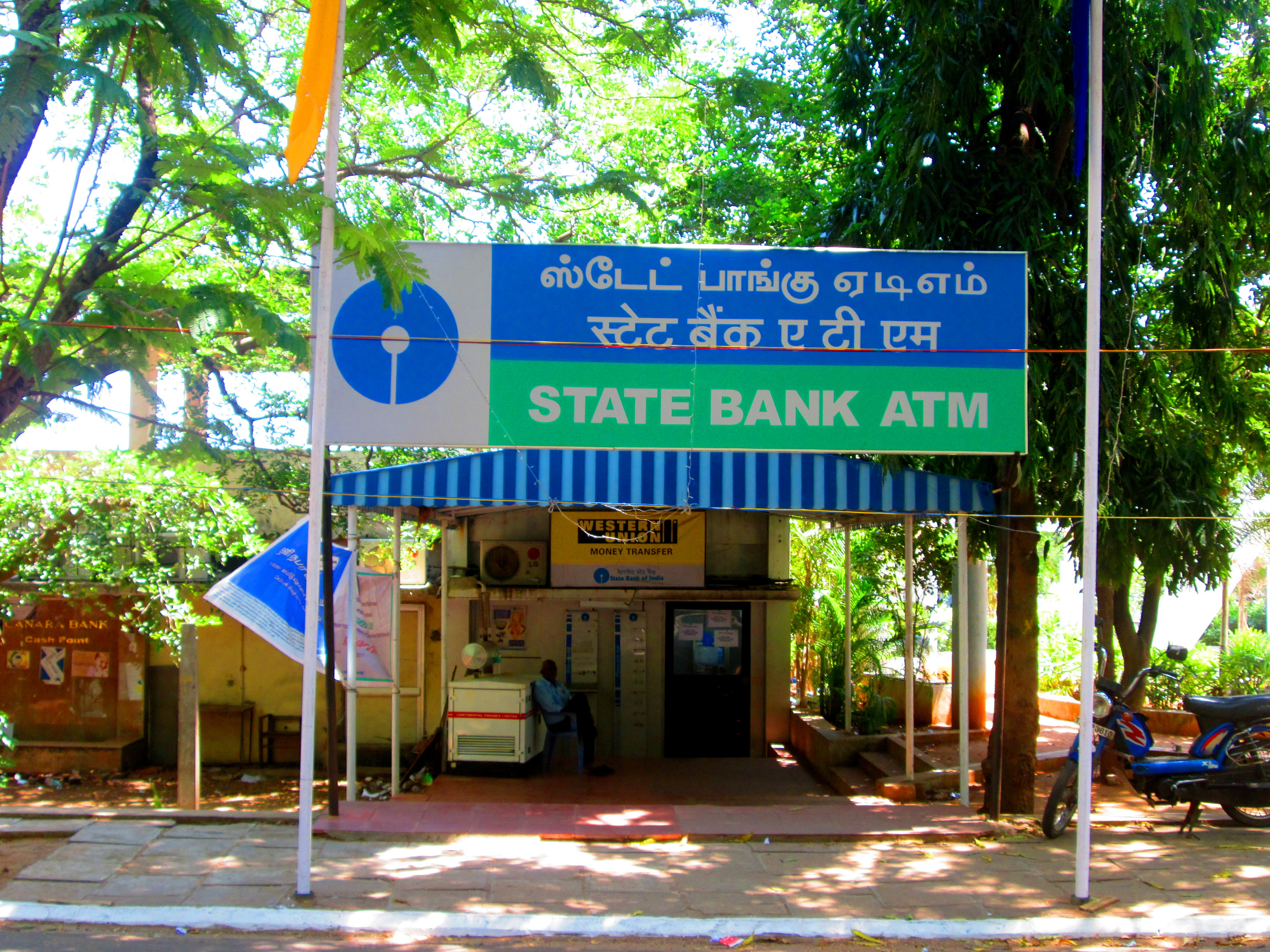
ATM at CEG

Under Tamil Nadu State Government ownership, CEG covers around 223 acres of land in the centre of Chennai. It serves as the main campus of Anna University.

== Academics ==
The College of Engineering, Guindy, runs undergraduate Engineering degrees in various fields, as well as postgraduate degrees, including MBA, MCA, M.E., M.Sc. M.Tech., M.S. by Research and Ph.D.programmes.

=== Events ===
- Kurukshetra is the first ever techno management college festival to attain UNESCO patronage. It has been certified with the ISO 9001:2015 and has acquired the support of the Ministry of Electronics and Information Technology, Digital India and the National e-Governance Division, Government of India in 2016. It conducts technical events, workshops, guest lectures, and displays technical projects to expand students' technical opportunities and knowledge.
- Techofes: This is an inter-college cultural festival with an exciting array of events from debates to dance, innovative workshops on photography, DJing, etc. and pro shows.
- Sangarsh: Organized by the Rotaract club of CEG (RCEG), Sangarsh is a musical concert aimed at raising funds for needy sections of society.
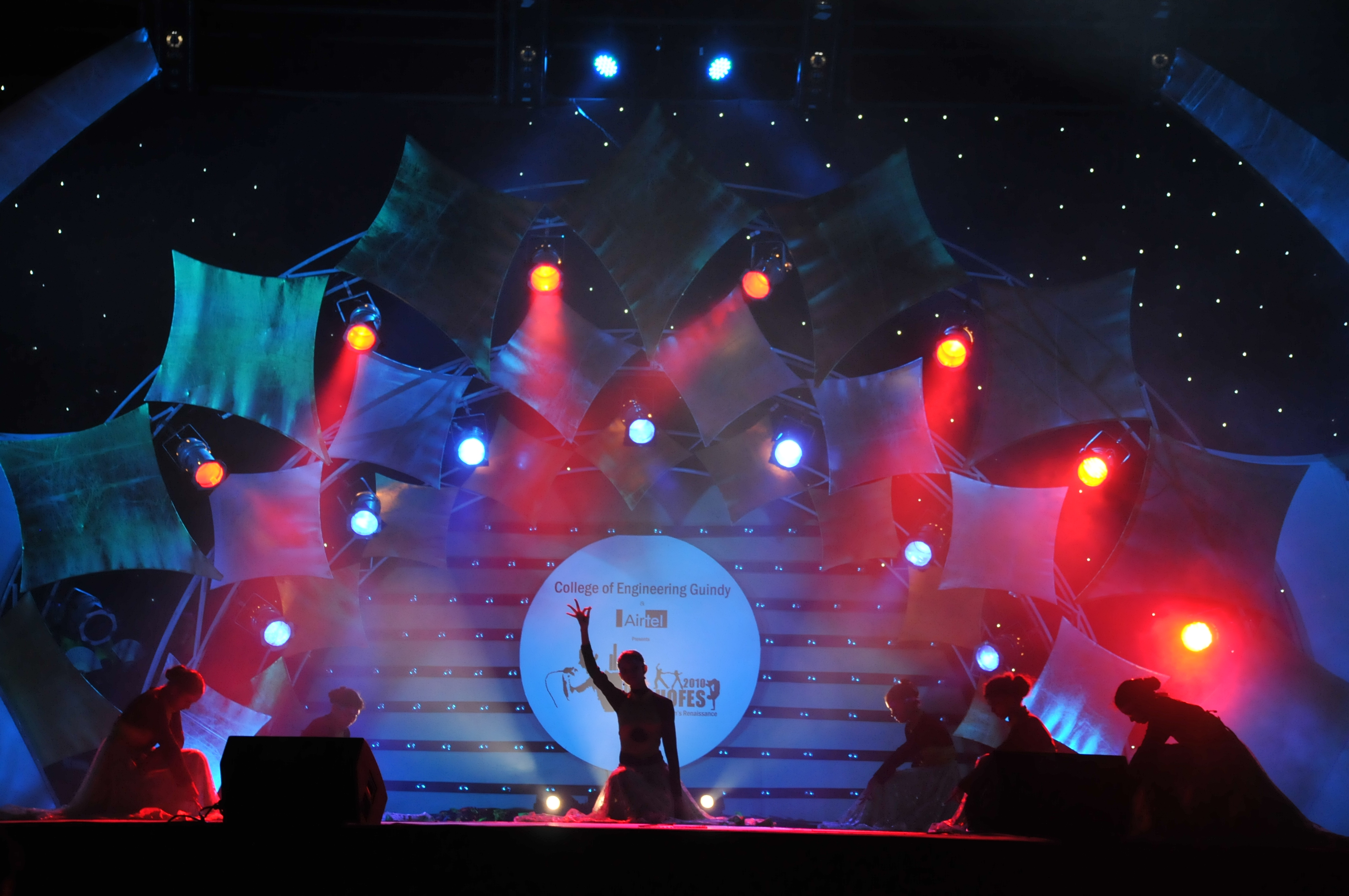
Techofes

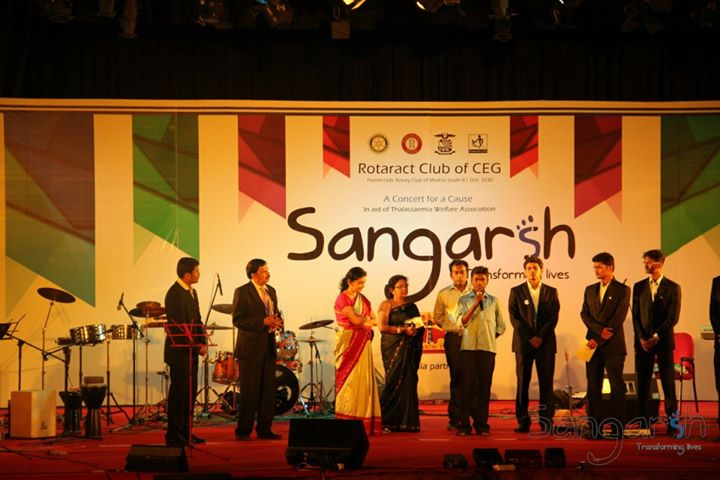
Sangarsh

== Notable alumni ==
- A Lalitha, First women engineer of India
- A. C. Muthiah, Indian industrialist and Former President, Board of Control for Cricket in India
- Nagarjuna, Telugu Film Actor
- Anumolu Ramakrishna, Deputy Managing Director of Larsen & Toubro
- Crazy Mohan, Tamil comedy actor, script writer and playwright
- Kavithalaya Krishnan, Indian film and television actor
- Dhiraj Rajaram, Founder & Chairman of Mu Sigma Inc
- Gopalaswami Parthasarathy, Former Indian High Commissioner to Pakistan, Australia and Myanmar and Chancellor, Central University of Jammu
- Kanuri Lakshmana Rao, Architect of India's water management, Former Union Minister of Irrigation & Power and recipient of the Padma Bhushan
- Krishnakumar Natarajan, Co-founder & Former Executive Chairman of Mindtree
- Krishnamachari Srikkanth, Former Indian Cricket Captain and Former Chairman, National Selection Committee of the Indian Cricket Team
- Kutraleeswaran, Long-distance swimmer and Guinness Book of World Records holder
- Madhan Karky, Tamil film lyricist
- Mendu Rammohan Rao, Former Dean Emeritus, Indian School of Business
- Munirathna Anandakrishnan, Former Chairman, Indian Institute of Technology, Kanpur and Former Vice-Chancellor, Anna University
- N. Mahalingam, Founder & Former Chairman, Sakthi Group and Former Chairman, Ethiraj College for Women
- P.K. Thressia, India's first female chief engineer.
- P. S. Veeraraghavan, Director of Vikram Sarabhai Space Centre
- R. K. Baliga, the father of the Electronics City in Bangalore, India
- P. V. Nandhidhaa, Indian Chess player, India's 17th Woman Grandmaster. Refer List of Indian chess players.
- Poondi Kumaraswamy-Ponnambalam Kumaraswamy, Engineer, Mathematician, and Hydrologist
- Raj Reddy, Turing Award winner, Professor at Carnegie-Mellon University and Padma Bhushan recipient
- Rajkumar Bharathi, Classical singer and music composer
- Rangaswamy Narasimhan, cognitive scientist who developed TIFRAC, the first indigenous Indian computer, Padma Shri winner
- Ravi Ruia, Vice Chairperson & Co-founder of Essar Group
- S. Somasegar, Former Corporate Vice President, Developer Division, Microsoft
- Srinivasaraghavan Venkataraghavan, Former Indian Cricket Captain and Former Member, ICC Elite Umpires Panel
- Upendra J. Chivukula, Former Deputy Speaker, New Jersey General Assembly
- V. M. Muralidharan, Chairman, Ethiraj College for Women
- V. S. Mahalingam, a distinguished DRDO scientist and Director of Centre for Artificial Intelligence and Robotics
- Venu Srinivasan, Chairman of Sundaram - Clayton Limited and TVS Motor Company
- Verghese Kurien, architect of Operation Flood and India's White Revolution and recipient of the Padma Vibhushan, Ramon Magsaysay Award and the World Food Prize
- Ashok Elluswamy, VP of AI, Tesla.

== See also ==
- List of Tamil Nadu Government's Educational Institutions
- Heritage structures in Chennai
- Indian Institute of Technology, Madras
- National Institute of Technology, Tiruchirappalli
