= Michael Topping =

Chief Marine Surveyor of Fort St. George in Chennai

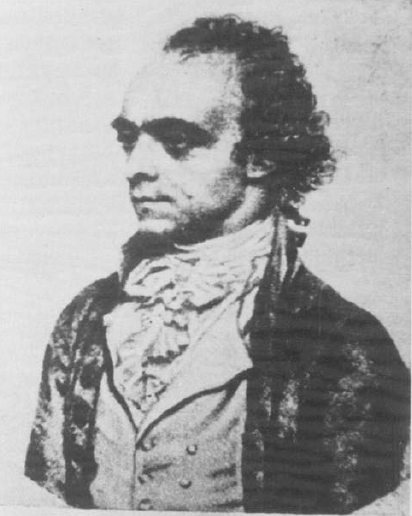
Michael Topping

Michael Topping (1747 – 7 January 1796) was the Chief Marine Surveyor of Fort St. George in Chennai (then Madras) responsible for founding the oldest modern technical school outside Europe. The Survey School was completed on 17 May 1794, with an initial intake of eight students. In 1858 it became the Civil Engineering School and the College of Engineering in 1861.

Topping was also the first full-time modern professional surveyor of India having surveyed the seas off the Coromandel Coast, India's south-east coast. Topping came to Madras in 1785 as a marine surveyor aboard the East India Ship Walpole. On the suggestion of Alexander Dalrymple, he conducted a triangulation survey of the Coromandel Coast from Madras to Masulipatnam in 1788, making use of a sextant. Topping suggested that this triangulation could be done across India, however this approach was only taken up much later by William Lambton. Topping was appointed from 1794 to survey water reservoirs and in order to conduct his "tank surveys" he sought to train (in his survey school) youths of mixed, that is, of European-Indian parentage from the Madras orphanage, and deploy them across southern India at a sixth of the allowances needed for military surveyors and without the need for interpreters. Topping persuaded astronomer William Petrie to transfer his private observatory to the government and set up the first modern astronomical observatory, the Madras Observatory, in Nungambakkam. Topping succeeded Petrie as the director of the observatory from 1789 to 1796 when he died. He died of fever on 7 January 1796 and is buried in Machilipatnam with a memorial with a Latin inscription. Topping was succeeded by John Goldingham.
