= Thomas Glanville Taylor =

English astronomer

- Born: 22 November 1804
- Died: 4 May 1848 (aged 43)
- Scientific career
- Fields: Astronomy

Thomas Glanville Taylor (22 November 1804 – 4 May 1848) was an English astronomer who worked extensively at the Madras Observatory and produced the Madras Catalogue of Stars from around 1831 to 1839.

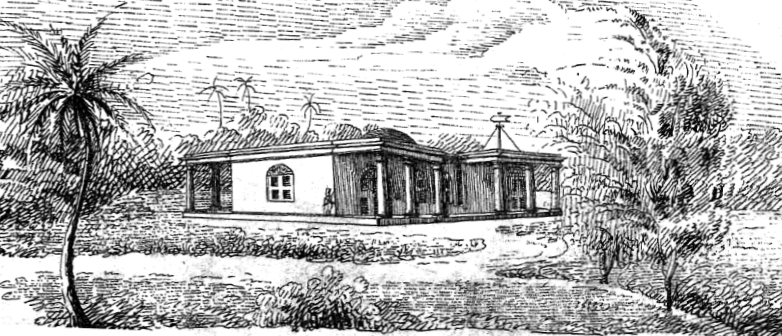
The Madras Observatory c. 1838

== Life ==
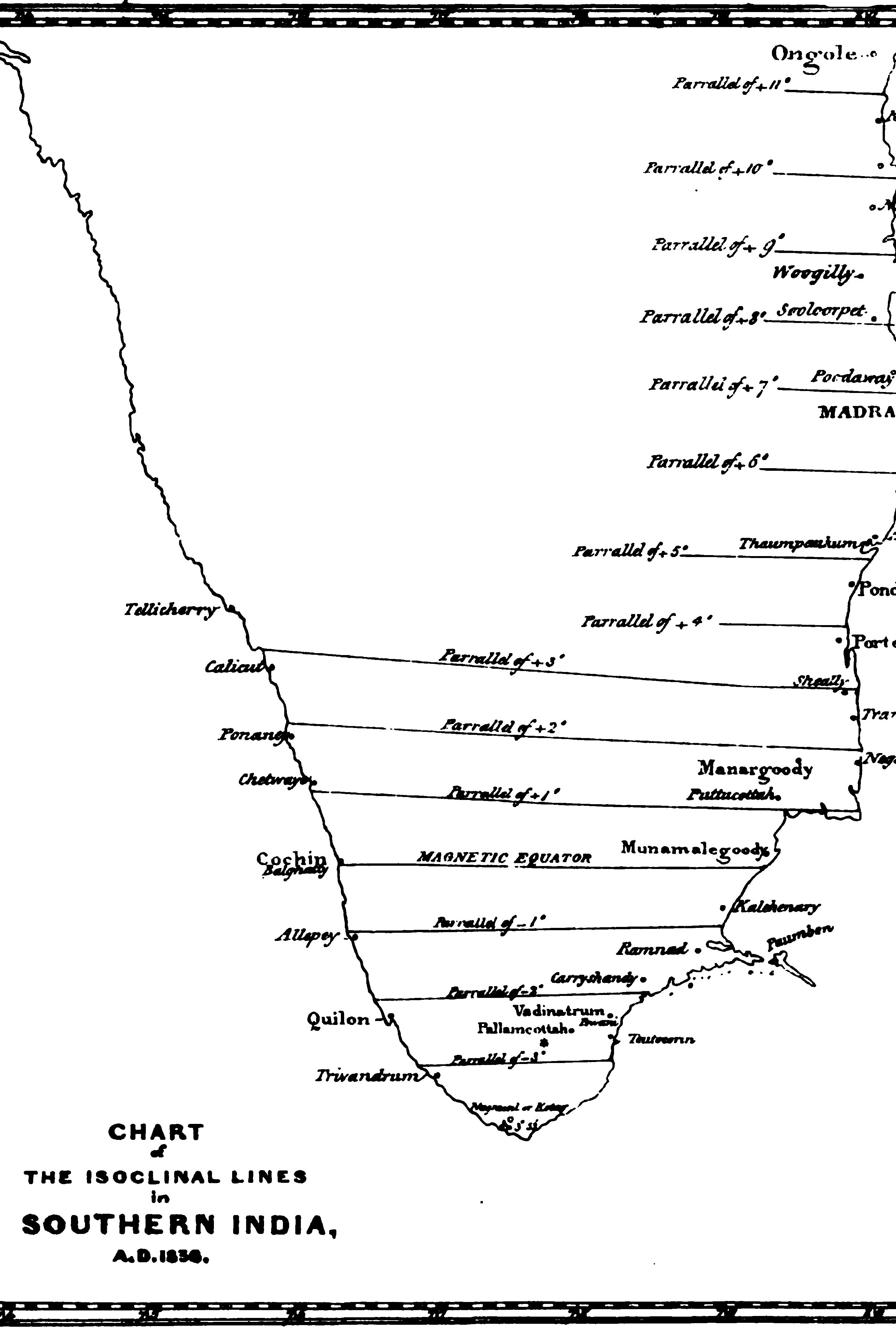
Magnetic survey of southern India

He was the son of Thomas Taylor, assistant at the Royal Greenwich Observatory, and his wife Susannah née Glanville, born at Ashburton, Devon. John Pond, the Astronomer Royal, suggested that the young boy choose a career in astronomy and he joined the observatory in 1820. From August 1822 he was in charge of making transit observations, and his ability was noted by Sir Edward Sabine. Taylor then worked on Stephen Groombridge's star catalogue.

Taylor was appointed director of the East India Company's observatory at Madras, arriving there on 15 September 1830. He brought with him new equipment including transit telescopes and a mural circle. He worked with four Indian assistants, who took observations when he went to join the Great Trigonometrical Survey. Taylor collaborated with John Caldecott of the Travancore observatory to make observations on the magnetic field, especially the magnetic equator, of the earth around 1837.

A Fellow of the Royal Astronomical Society and the Royal Society (elected 10 February 1842) Taylor helped establish an observatory at Doddabetta in Ootacamund. He was suffering from tuberculosis when he went to visit his ailing daughter in England in 1848. She died in April, and he himself died a month later, in Southampton. He was succeeded at the Madras Observatory by William Stephen Jacob (1813-1862).

== Works ==
Taylor began the publication of the Madras General Catalogue of Stars which was praised by Sir George Airy. His catalogues were of importance in navigation and in the Trigonometrical Survey for determining longitude as well as latitude.

== Family ==
Taylor married Eliza Baratty, daughter of Colonel Eley, on 4 July 1832. They had three sons and a daughter.
