= Dhiraj Rajaram =

Indian entrepreneur

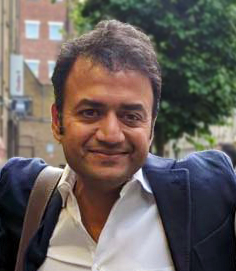
Dhiraj Rajaram is founder, chairman and CEO of Mu Sigma

Dhiraj C Rajaram (born in 1975) is an Indian entrepreneur and the founder, chairman and CEO of Mu Sigma Inc, a provider of analytics and decision sciences solutions. He was born in 1975 Chennai, India and brought up in Bengaluru, India.

== Early years ==
Rajaram completed his bachelor's degree in Electrical Engineering from College of Engineering, Guindy, M.S. in computer engineering from Wayne State University, Michigan and MBA from Booth School of Business at University of Chicago. After completing his education, Rajaram worked as a management consultant at Pricewaterhouse Coopers (PwC) and Booz Allen Hamilton in the US.

== Mu Sigma ==
After quitting his job at Booz Allen Hamilton, Rajaram started the data analytics and decision sciences company Mu Sigma Inc. in Bengaluru, Karnataka, 2004.The company provides solutions to over 125 Fortune 500 companies. In 2016, Fortune named Mu Sigma to the "Unicorn" category - a technology startup valued at more than US$1B.

== Recognition ==
Rajaram was listed as one of Fortune Magazine's "40 under 40" in 2011 and 2013. In 2012 he was awarded the "Entrepreneur Of The Year India" award in Services sector by Ernst and Young India. In early 2014, Rajaram was awarded the Young Turk award at the CNBC TV18 India Business Leaders Awards. Rajaram won the distinguished alumni award for entrepreneurship from University of Chicago Booth School of Business in 2014.

== Personal life ==
Rajaram married his engineering college friend Ambiga at the age of 21 and they have a son named Akash. The couple split in 2016. He currently lives in Bangalore.
