= René François Joseph de Warren =

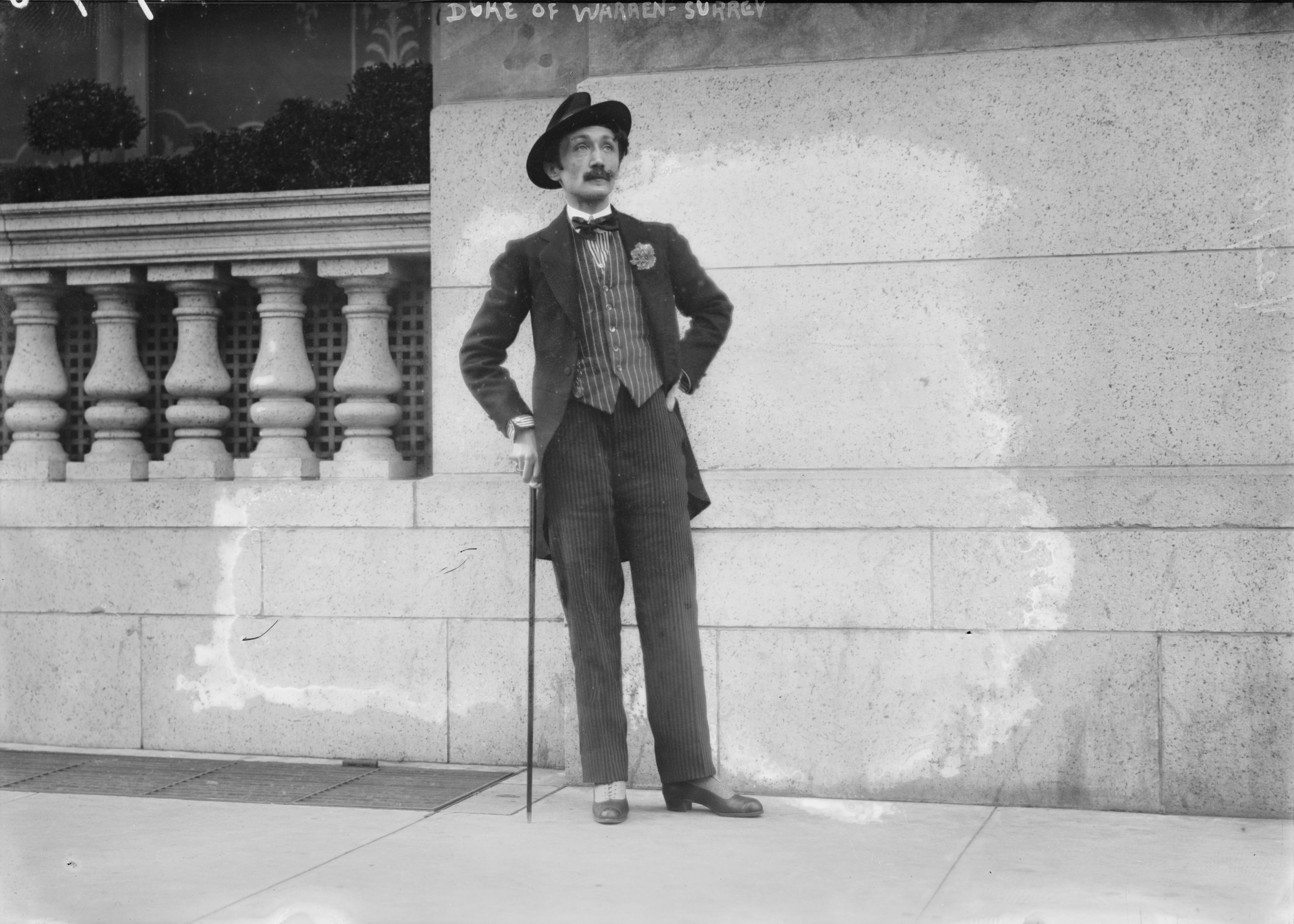

René François Joseph de Warren (1879–1926) was the self-proclaimed Duke of Warren-Surrey.

== Family and claim to title "Duke of Warren-Surrey" ==
Warren was eldest of three sons of Anselme Stanislas Firmin Léon de Warren (born 1851) and Marie Huyn de Vernéville, who also had four daughters. Anselme de Warren, an officer in the 2nd Hussars, was the second son; his elder brother, Lucien (born 1844), was heir to their father Edward's title of Comte de Warren, and was noted in 1902 (his father having died in 1898) to be "the present Comte de Warren". He married twice, and had several sons living at the time René de Warren claimed to be "Duke of Warren-Surrey"; they would have been senior to René in line for any titles, "Duke of Warren-Surrey", at any rate, not appearing in any published treatment of the family. René de Warren's great-grandfather was Jean Baptiste François Joseph de Warren, a surveyor in India who rediscovered the Kolar Gold Fields.

== Legal altercations ==
Despite having himself acknowledged that his right to the title was not firmly established (this acknowledgement notwithstanding the fact that the Warren family were recorded as Counts, there being no record of an elevation in status to Duke, and that René would have been preceded by several senior male cousins in inheritance of any title) – having, in March 1914, stated "I am about to vindicate myself" and observed that "when all is proved" he would be considered a very attractive matrimonial prospect – in April that year he sued the society reporter Frederick Cunliffe-Owen, who questioned his title, in a libel suit for $25,000.
