= William Petrie =

English merchant and civil servant (1747-1816)

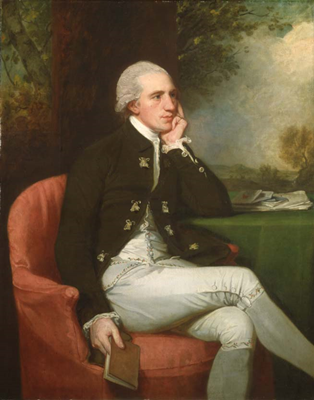
- portrait by George Romney
- Born: 1784
- Died: 27 October 1816 (aged 31–32)

William Petrie (1747 – 27 October 1816) was a British officer of the East India Company in Chennai (formerly Madras) during the 1780s, and was Governor of Prince of Wales Island (Penang Island) from 1812 to 1816. An amateur astronomer, Petrie helped found the first modern observatory outside Europe, the Madras Observatory.

== Life ==
=== East India Company career ===
The chronology of his advancement through the Honorable East India Company is as follows:

- 1765 - Writer
- 1771 - Factor
- 1774 - Junior Merchant
- 1776 - Senior Merchant; At Home
- 1778 - In India
- 1782 - At Home
- 1790 - Member of the Council of the Governor
- 1793 - At Home
- 1800 - President of the Board of Revenue, and Member of the Council of the Governor
- 1809 - Appointed Governor of the Prince of Wales Island
- Died 27 October 1816, at Prince of Wales Island.

=== Astronomy ===
In 1786, Petrie set up a private observatory as a geographical and navigational aid in his residence in Egmore, Chennai, India, recording the first modern astronomical observations outside Europe on 5 December 1786. His observatory and instruments later contributed to the first modern observatory outside Europe, the Madras Observatory, being established in nearby Nungambakkam; an original instrument (a gridiron astronomical clock made by John Shelton) donated by Petrie to the observatory can be seen at the Kodaikanal Solar Observatory. Petrie's efforts led to Michael Topping (1747–96) being appointed as the astronomer of this observatory by the Company (the observatory later evolved into Indian Institute of Astrophysics).

Petrie was a Member of Council in Madras in the 1790s, and acted for three months as Governor of Madras in 1807.

He was elected a Fellow of the Royal Society in November 1795.

=== Governor of Penang ===
Petrie received his appointment on 29 Nov 1811 probably owing to Archibald Seton being absent on duty with the Java Expedition. Seton was officially Lieutenant-Governor of Penang from 9 May 1811 to 27 July 1812 but was absent on duty with The Java Expedition from 13 May 1811 until the end.

Petrie served as Acting Governor till the end of Seton's official rule and then as Governor of Penang from September 1812 to October 1816. He died, aged 69, while still in office, and is buried at the Old Protestant Cemetery, George Town.

A number of the “interactions” with the public by the Governors were recorded in the Prince of Wales Island Gazette. In the last days of 1813, Petrie requested that “the Gentlemen of His Majesty’s and the Honorable Company’s Civil, Naval and Military Service, and the other Gentlemen of the Settlement will honor him with their company at Breakfast at half past eight; and at dinner, at half past four o’clock, on New Year’s Day.”

Following his death, his 'widow' was granted a pension by the East India Company. She was not legally his widow, but a Eurasian woman, Mrs Warren, the daughter of Jean Baptiste François Joseph de Warren, an officer in the French army at Pondicherry. She bore Petrie five children, and later died at her home in Baker Street, London on 20 March 1819.
