= 70 Ophiuchi =

Star in the constellation Ophiuchus

- Location of 70 Ophiuchi in the constellation Ophiuchus

Observation data Epoch J2000 Equinox ICRS
- Constellation: Ophiuchus
- 70 Ophiuchi
- Right ascension: 18^{h} 05^{m} 27.285^{s}
- Declination: +02° 29′ 00.36″
- Apparent magnitude (V): 4.00 - 4.03
- 70 Oph A
- Right ascension: 18^{h} 05^{m} 27.248^{s}
- Declination: +02° 30′ 00.53″
- Apparent magnitude (V): 4.13
- 70 Oph B
- Right ascension: 18^{h} 05^{m} 27.463^{s}
- Declination: +02° 29′ 56.21″
- Apparent magnitude (V): 6.07

Characteristics
- Evolutionary stage: main sequence
- Spectral type: K0V + K4V
- Apparent magnitude (B): 4.97/7.26
- Apparent magnitude (R): 3.6/5.6
- U−B color index: +0.69
- B−V color index: +0.82/+1.15
- Variable type: BY Dra

Astrometry

70 Oph A
Radial velocity (R_{v})	−5.73±0.18 km/s
Proper motion (μ)	RA: 206.525 mas/yr Dec.: −1107.492 mas/yr
Parallax (π)	195.5674±0.1964 mas
Distance	16.68 ± 0.02 ly (5.113 ± 0.005 pc)
Absolute magnitude (M_{V})	+5.627

70 Oph B
Radial velocity (R_{v})	−9.47±0.22 km/s
Proper motion (μ)	RA: 333.292 mas/yr Dec.: −1068.354 mas/yr
Parallax (π)	195.2166±0.1012 mas
Distance	16.707 ± 0.009 ly (5.123 ± 0.003 pc)
Absolute magnitude (M_{V})	+7.427

Orbit
Period (P)	88.126±0.010 yr
Semi-major axis (a)	4.54332+0.00089 −0.00088" (23.232+0.025 −0.024 AU)
Eccentricity (e)	0.50015+0.00017 −0.00016
Inclination (i)	121.144±0.028°
Longitude of the node (Ω)	121.666±0.032°
Periastron epoch (T)	2,477,904.6±8.4 JD
Argument of periastron (ω) (secondary)	193.154±0.058°
Semi-amplitude (K_{1}) (primary)	3.51±0.04 km/s
Semi-amplitude (K_{2}) (secondary)	4.25±0.05 km/s

Details

70 Oph A
Mass	0.8827+0.0044 −0.0043 M_{☉}
Radius	0.831±0.004 R_{☉}
Luminosity	0.53±0.02 L_{☉}
Habitable zone inner limit	0.623 AU
Habitable zone outer limit	1.242 AU
Surface gravity (log g)	4.55±0.03 cgs
Temperature	5,301±67 K
Metallicity [Fe/H]	+0.05±0.03 dex
Rotation	19.33±0.31 days
Rotational velocity (v sin i)	1.5 – 3 km/s
Age	2.81+1.65 −0.80 or 6.2±1.0 Gyr

70 Oph B
Mass	0.7319±0.0031 M_{☉}
Radius	0.670±0.009 R_{☉}
Luminosity	0.15±0.02 L_{☉}
Habitable zone inner limit	0.359 AU
Habitable zone outer limit	0.712 AU
Surface gravity (log g)	4.64±0.02 cgs
Temperature	4,465±65 K
Metallicity [Fe/H]	+0.05±0.03 dex
Rotation	24.8±1.0 days
Rotational velocity (v sin i)	1.5 – 3 km/s
Age	2.99+0.66 −0.51 or 6.2±1.0 Gyr

Other designations
- p Oph, 70 Oph, V2391 Oph, BD+02 3482, GJ 702, HD 165341, HIP 88601, HR 6752, SAO 123107, PLX 4137
- 70 Oph A: LHS 458
- 70 Oph B: LHS 459

Database references
SIMBAD	The system
- A
- B
Exoplanet Archive	data
ARICNS	data

70 Ophiuchi (p Ophiuchi) is a binary star system located 16.7 light-years away from the Earth. It is in the constellation Ophiuchus. At magnitude 4 it appears as a dim star visible to the unaided eye away from city lights.

== History ==
In Ptolemy's 2nd-century Almagest star catalogue this star system is listed as a 4th magnitude star, the 28th (or 4th outside the constellation figure) in Ophiuchus. It is star No. 261 in this catalogue.

This star system was first catalogued as a binary star by William Herschel in the late 18th century in his study of binary stars. Herschel proved that this system is a gravitationally bound binary system where the two stars orbit around a common center of mass. This was an important contribution to the proof that Newton's law of universal gravitation applied to objects beyond the Solar System.

This star was once considered part of the obsolete constellation Taurus Poniatovii, but after the International Astronomical Union officially recognized constellations, it was placed in Ophiuchus.

In Chinese astronomy, the asterism Zōng Rén (宗人, Official of Religious Ceremonies) consists of 66 Ophiuchi, 67 Ophiuchi, 68 Ophiuchi and 70 Ophiuchi. The Chinese name for 70 Ophiuchi itself is Zōng Rén sì (宗人四), the fourth star of Zōng Rén.

== Variability ==
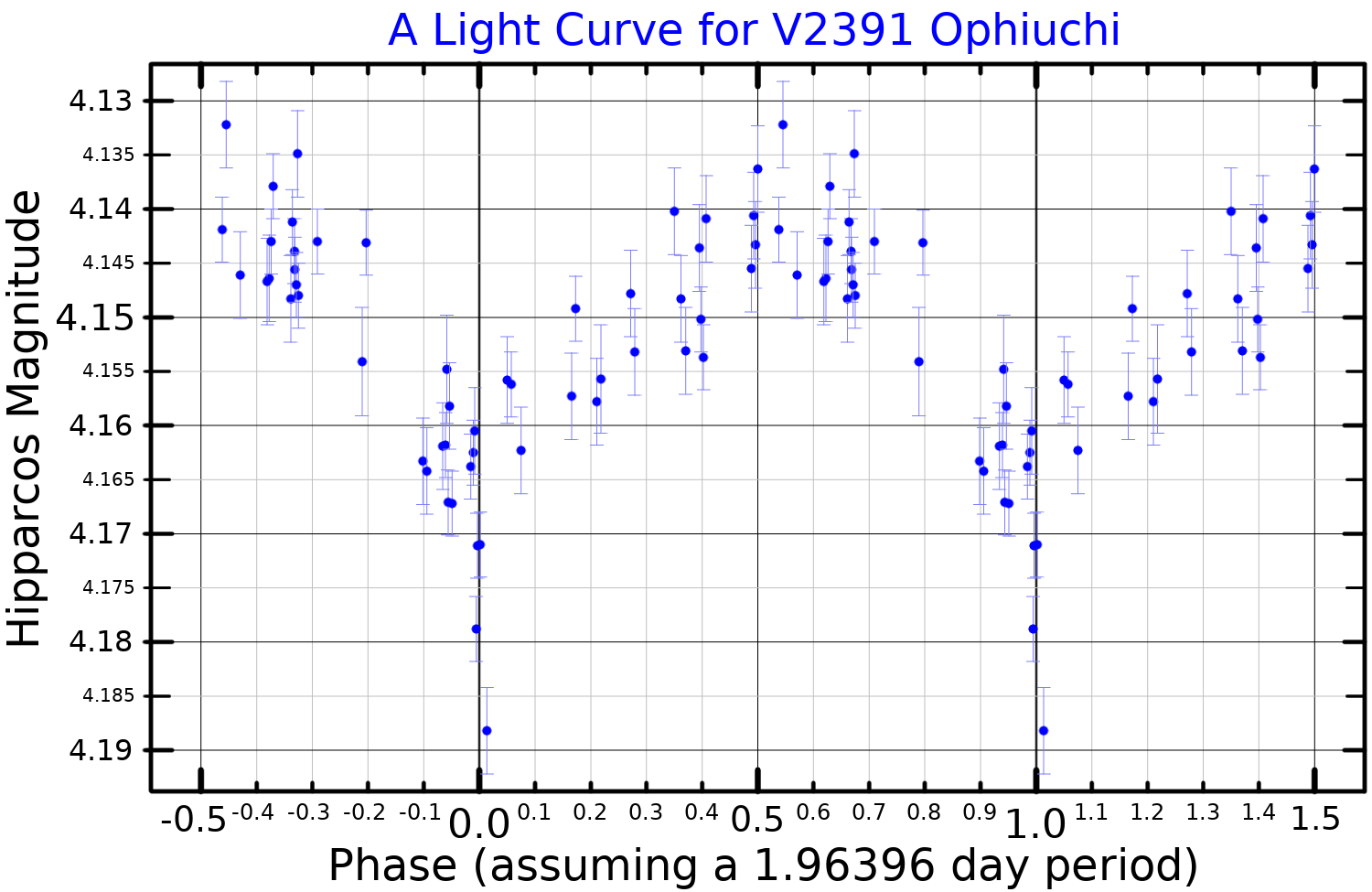
A light curve for V2391 Ophiuchi, plotted from Hipparcos data

70 Ophiuchi is a variable star with a magnitude range for the two stars combined of 4.00 to 4.03. The type of variability is uncertain and it is not clear which of the two components causes the variations. It has been suspected of being either a BY Draconis variable or an RS Canum Venaticorum variable, although the latter would require a close-in companion which has not been detected. It is suspected that 70 Ophiuchi B is the variable star. A period of 1.92396 days has been measured.

== Binary star ==
The primary star is a yellow-orange main sequence dwarf of spectral type K0, while the secondary is an orange dwarf of spectral type K4. The two stars orbit each other at a semi-major axis of 23.2 AU. But since the orbit is highly elliptical (at e=0.499), the separation between the two varies from 11.4 to 34.8 AU, with one orbit taking 88.38 years to complete.

== Claims of a planetary system ==
In 1855, William Stephen Jacob of the Madras Observatory claimed that the orbit of the binary showed an anomaly, and it was "highly probable" that there was a "planetary body in connection with this system". This is the first known attempt to use astrometric methods to detect an exoplanet, although Friedrich Bessel had applied similar methods 10 years earlier to deduce the existence of Sirius B.

T. J. J. See made a stronger claim for the existence of a dark companion in this system in 1899, but Forest Ray Moulton soon published a paper proving that a three-body system with the specified orbital parameters would be highly unstable. The claims by Jacob and See have both been shown to be erroneous.

Discovery of a "third dark companion" was announced by Louis Berman in 1932. This "dark body" around 70 Oph A was thought to have an 18-year period and a mass of 0.1 to 0.2 the Sun's mass. A claim of a planetary system was again made, this time by Dirk Reuyl and Erik Holberg in 1943. The companion was estimated to have a mass 0.008 to 0.012 that of the Sun and a 17-year period. This caused quite a sensation at the time but later observations have gradually discredited this claim.

The negative results of past studies does not completely rule out the possibility of planets. In 2006 a McDonald Observatory team set limits to the presence of one or more planets around 70 Ophiuchi with masses between 0.46 and 12.8 Jupiter masses and average separations spanning between 0.05 and 5.2 AU.

Radial velocity observations also have detected no exoplanets around both stars. For 70 Oph A, Jupiter-mass planets interior to 5 astronomical units are excluded, while for 70 Oph B planets more massive than 0.25 – 0.3 Jupiter masses (M_{J}) orbiting within 0.5 au are excluded. Around 70 Ophiuchi A, planets with a mass similar to Saturn or less, within the habitable zone, are still possible, allowing for the possibility of a habitable planet.

== See also ==
- 36 Ophiuchi
- 61 Cygni
- Barnard's Star
- List of nearest stars
- List of nearest K-type stars
