= Nungambakkam =

Neighbourhood in Chennai district, Tamil Nadu, India

- Neighbourhood
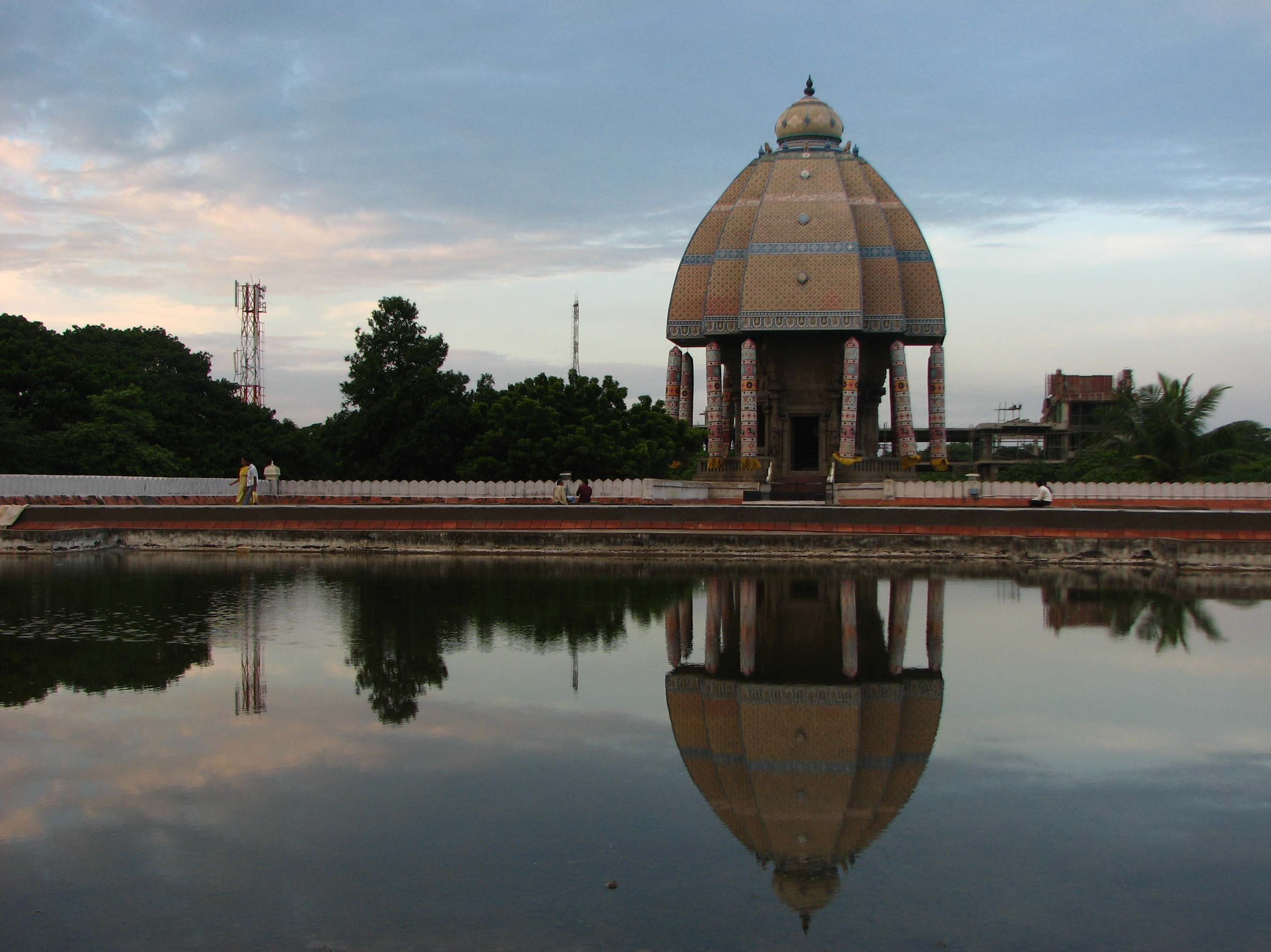
- Valluvar Kottam
- Nickname: Nungai
- Nungambakkam நுங்கம்பாக்கம் (Chennai) Nungambakkam (Tamil Nadu) Nungambakkam (India)
- Coordinates: 13.0569°N 80.2425°E
- Country: India
- State: Tamil Nadu
- District: Chennai District
- Taluk: Egmore
- Metro: Chennai

Government
  - Body: Greater Chennai Corporation
- Elevation: 56 m (184 ft)

Language
  - Official: Tamil
- Time zone: UTC+5:30 (IST)
- PIN: 600034
- Vehicle registration: TN-01
- Planning agency: CMDA
- Civic agency: Greater Chennai Corporation
- Website: www.chennai.tn.nic.in

Nungambakkam is an upscale neighbourhood of Chennai, India situated about 5.0 kilometres (3.1 miles) from kilometre zero of Chennai city. Apart from being a popular shopping district, Nungambakkam has revenue and passport offices, consulates and the sprawling official residences of top bank executives and bureaucrats.

Nungambakkam is a settlement of great antiquity and is mentioned in inscriptions dating from the Chola period. It was acquired by the British East India Company through a Mughal firman dated 1708 along with four other villages. Save a few garden houses belonging to officers of the Company, Nungambakkam has been, for a long time, predominantly rural in character and its boundaries constituted the limits of Madras city well into the twentieth century. However, with the expansion of the city westwards in the past decades, there has been steady urbanisation. Some of its areas such as Rutland Gate Road have the reputation of being among the most expensive pieces of real estate in Chennai city.

Nungambakkam is home to the Regional Meteorological Centre which is one of the two places in Chennai where meteorological observations are made, the other being Meenambakkam. The Department of Public Instruction functions from a building on College Road. The Loyola College and Women's Christian College also have their campuses in Nungambakkam.

== History ==
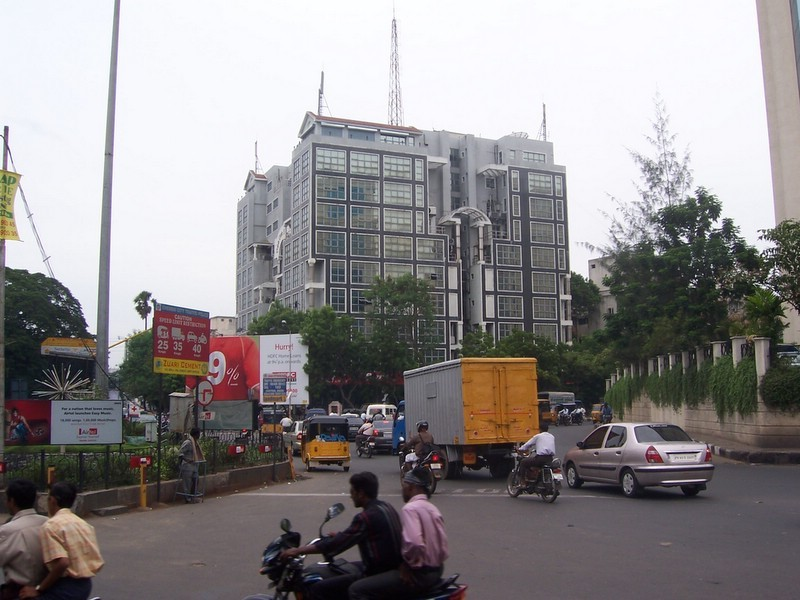
Sterling road junction, Nungambakkam

Nungambakkam is one of the oldest parts of Chennai. It formed the western limits of Madras until the 1960s, and it was part of Madras since the 18th century.

According to K.V. Raman's The Early History of the Madras Region, Nungambakkam features in an 11th-century CE copper plate pertaining to Rajendra Chola.

According to the Chennai Corporation's records, Nungambakkam village, which was under a Mughal firman, was handed over to the British along with four other villages (Tiruvatiyoor, Kathiwakam, Vyasarpady and Sathangadu) in 1708. These five villages were hence forward known as the 'Five New Towns'. Since then, Nungambakkam has been a part of Madras city. Public buildings and colleges rose in the 1850s.

In the early 20th century, Nungambakkam rose as one of the upper-class European residential areas, housing civil servants and influential members of the city administration. Most of the neighborhood today is built upon the Long Tank which was encroached and eventually made a landfill in the early 1970's. The 1911 Encyclopædia Britannica records the presence of vast empty spaces and parks in Nungambakkam. Most of Nungambakkam's principal lanes, such as College Road, Haddows Road and Sterling Road, are over 100 years old and appear in a 1909 map of Madras city. Sterling Road consists of trees in both the sides. Traffic is very high in Nungambakkam during peak hours (8am-11am and 6pm-9.30pm) due to various road junctions which connects some important places in Chennai city. There are a lot of ATMs and branches of various international banks such as Standard Chartered, Deutsche Bank etc..

The Women's Christian College was established in 1915. The Good Shepherd Convent later known as the Good Shephered Higher Secondary Matriculation School was established in 1925. Loyola College was established as an arts college in 1925.

Valluvar Kottam, a monument named after the Tamil poet Valluvar and inaugurated in April 1976, is a significant landmark of Nungambakkam located towards the end of Valluvar Kottam High Road.

== Localities ==
The Regional Passport Office of Chennai is located on Haddows Road, Nungambakkam. It issues passports to half of Tamil Nadu. Nungambakkam is also home to the Austrian, Canadian and South Korean consulates in Chennai, as well as the British Deputy High Commission.

== Transport ==
Nungambakkam is well connected to other parts of the city. Many of the state-run Metropolitan Transport Corporation buses run through Nungambakkam. Nungambakkam has its own Suburban Train Station on the Chennai Beach - Tambaram Railway Station railway line, which connects it to other parts of the city.

The Nungambakkam station is among the top three EMU stations, along with Chromepet and St. Thomas Mount, in terms of the number of persons who use the facilities on the Chennai Beach-Tambaram section every day.
