= Women's Christian College =

Women's Christian College may refer to:

- Women's Christian College, Ernakulam, Tamil Nadu, India
- Women's Christian College, Calcutta, West Bengal, India
- Women's Christian College, Chennai
- Women's Christian College, Nagercoil
