= Jean Baptiste François Joseph de Warren =

Surveyor and astronomer in British India (1769–1830)

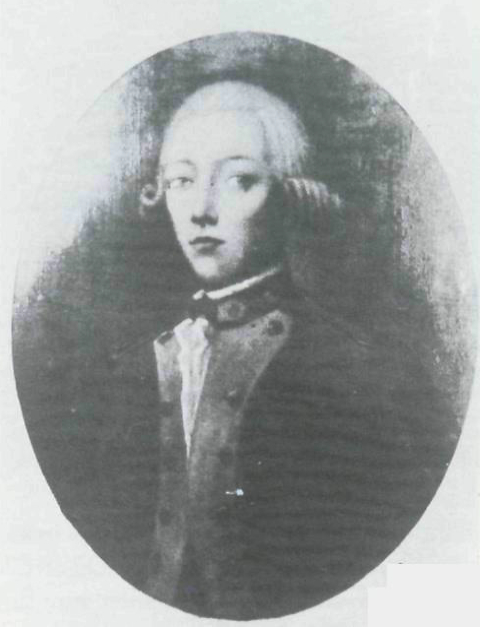
Portrait as a boy

Jean Baptiste François Joseph de Warren (21 September 1769 – 9 February 1830), also known as John Warren, was an army captain and later lieutenant-colonel with Her Majesty's 33rd Regiment of Foot, East India Company in India, surveyor and amateur astronomer. While working as a surveyor in the Great Trigonometrical Survey he rediscovered what became the Kolar Gold Fields and in later life he documented Indian astronomy and time-keeping in his book Kala Sankalita.

== Biography ==
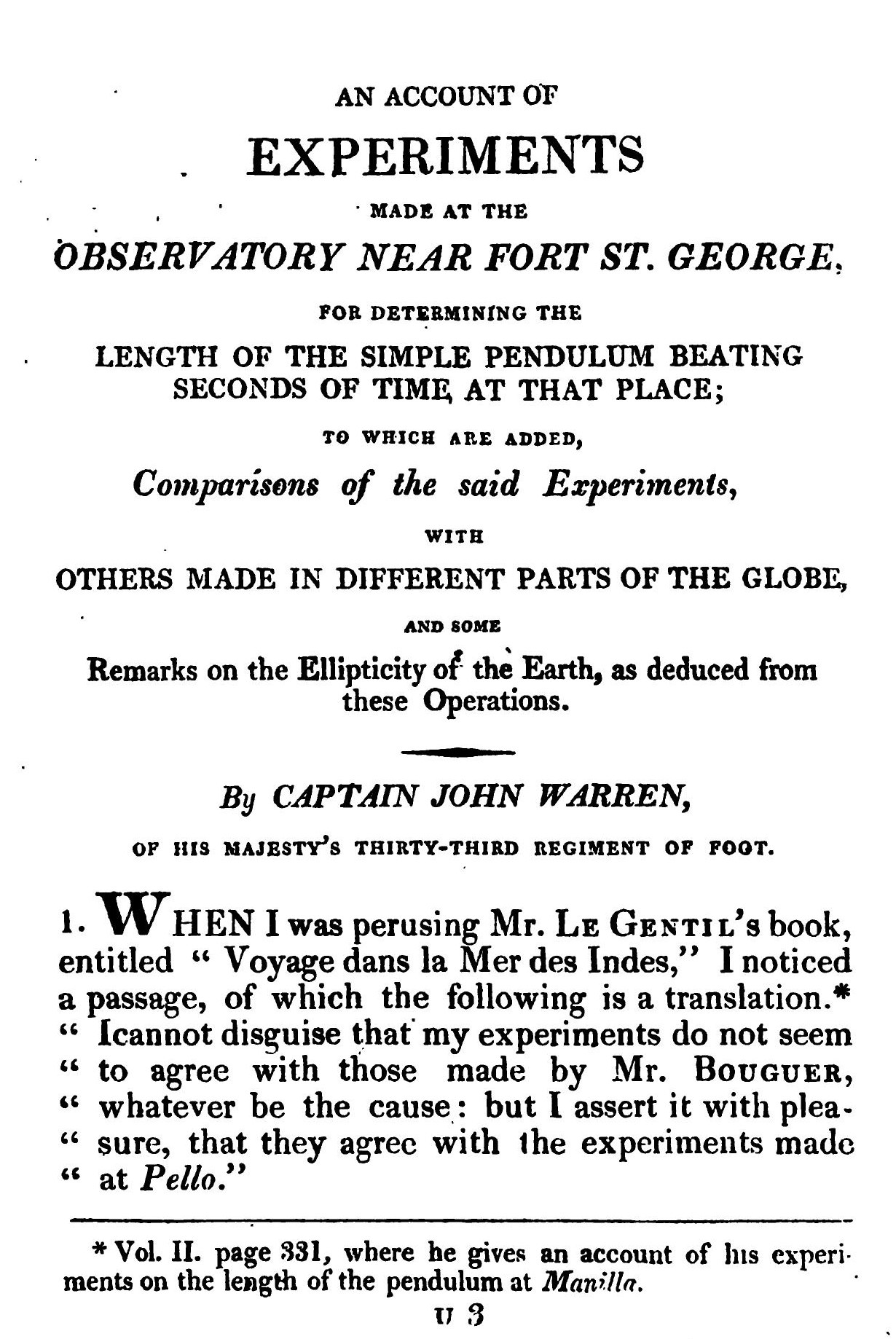
1812 experiments with pendulums

=== Early life ===
Warren was born at Livorno, Italy, the fourth child of Count Henry Hyacinthe de Warren and Christine Walburge de Meuerers. The Warrens claimed descent from William de Warenne, 1st Earl of Surrey; per Ruvigny, they descended from "Edward Warren, of Seatown", Dublin, "of an old English family claiming descent from the Earls of Warren".

=== Career ===
He moved to London in 1793 and tried to work as an artist but failed. He then moved to Calcutta on 10 December 1793 and attempted to become an indigo planter but failed. He bought commission as an ensign in the army and fought in Mysore under Arthur Wellesley against Tipu Sultan. After the victory against Tipu, and in view of his "addiction to mathematical studies" he was appointed to assist the Mysore Survey under William Lambton. He conducted additional experiments during Lambton's initial baseline trials in Bangalore to examine the effects of refraction on measurements. He also examined the effects of humidity by constructing a hygrometer that made use of the beards of a local grass called Panimooloo Heteropogon contortus. While surveying the region near Malur, Warren heard about gold deposits and examined the old mines in the Kolar region that had been abandoned as being too low in yield. He was a proponent for the use of milestones and he put in 262 markers at his own expense between Srirangapatnam and Naickenchero and between Bangalore and Balamangalam. Warren held the post of Company Astronomer and was a superintendent of the surveying school at Madras. During his term at the surveying school he was charged of embezzling money and was forced to return an excess of 3860 pagodas (100 pagodas per year per student was the norm but Warren was drawing 1200 per year) due to complaints from a student.

Warren was acting director at the Madras Observatory from February 1805 to October 1811 and in this period he established the longitude of Madras, a figure that was used in the trigonometrical survey and for nearly a century. In 1812 he published the results of measurements of the periods of pendulums and compared them with measurements from other parts of the world and came to the conclusion that the departure from predicted values was due to heterogeneity in the geology of the Earth. In 1814 he returned to France with his son Edouard. He was reinstated into the French army with the rank of Lieutenant-Colonel and was made Chevalier of St Louis. He became a corresponding member of the Bureau des Longitudes. Leaving his son to study in France, he returned to settle in Pondicherry and work on a book on the methods of timekeeping and calendar making in southern India. The book, Kala Sankalita, begun in 1814 was finally published in 1825. Among the calculations that Warren documented was the computation of lunar eclipses by a Pondicherry-based calendar maker who used shells placed on the ground and coded formulae. In 1824 he was made Chevalier of the Legion of Honour.

Warren died in Pondicherry on 9 February 1830 and a book on his life was written by his son Edouard - L'Inde Anglaise en 1843.

=== Personal life ===
In 1809, Warren married Anne Laurence Alexandrine, daughter of Pondicherry planter Nicolas Antoine Marcilly. They had six children, of whom four – two sons and two daughters – survived: the elder son, Edward (also "Édouard") Francis Patrick, was grandfather of René François Joseph de Warren, known for his claims to be "Duke of Warren-Surrey".
