= Rhishard Llewellyn Jones =

Welsh professor of physics

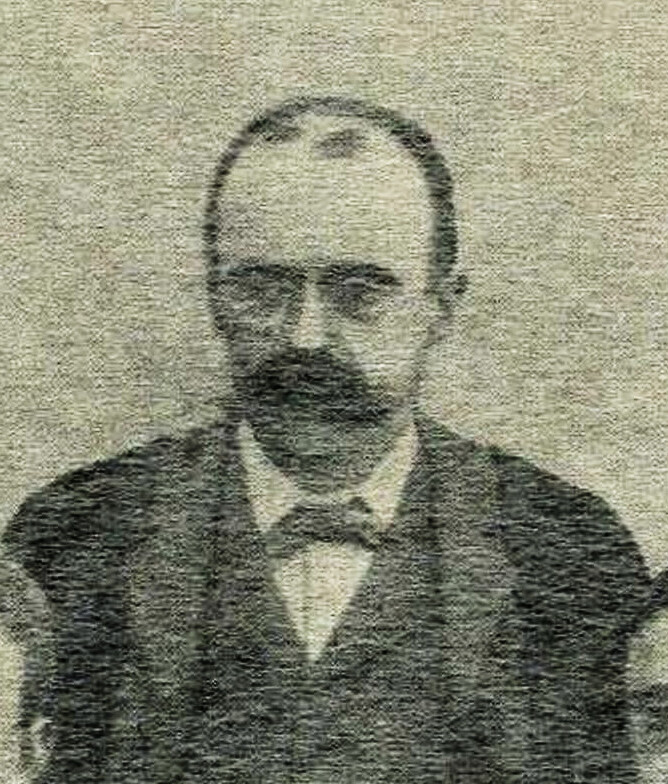
Prof. Jones in 1895

Rhishard Llewellyn Jones (12 June 1865 – 3 March 1932) was a Welsh professor of physics who worked at the Presidency College Madras and also served as a director of the Madras Observatory. His students included C. V. Raman.

Jones was born in Pempompren, Cardiganshire and was educated at Talybout and at Ardwyn House School, Aberystwyth before entering Corpus Christi College, Cambridge where he graduated 23rd wrangler in 1887. He worked at Dulwich College and joined as a professor of physics at the Presidency College, Madras in 1889. He received an MA in 1893. At Madras he also served as Government Meteorologist from 1899. Jones was elected Fellow of the Royal Astronomical Society in 1895, while a brother of his contributed to the Astronomical Society of Wales.
