= Sangarsh =

Sangarsh 14
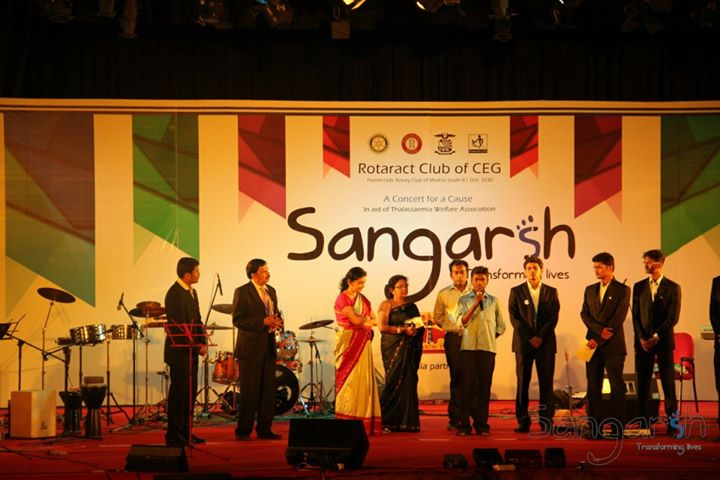
- Citation at Sangarsh 13
- Motto: Transforming Lives
- Established: 2003
- Location: Chennai, Tamil Nadu, India; 13.010979°N 80.235426°E
- Campus: Urban
- Nickname: RCEGians

Sangarsh is an annual fund-raising musical concert organised by Rotaract club of CEG, Anna University, Chennai. Sangarsh is focused at aiding the needy sections of the society. Many eminent playback singers have made their presence over the years. Actor Kamal Haasan was the patron for Sangarsh'11. Oscar-winning Music Director A. R. Rahman was the patron of Sangarsh'12. Veteran actor Prakash Raj and actor Srikanth were the patrons for Sangarsh'13.

== Background ==
Sangarsh has been conducted by the Rotaract Club of College of Engineering, Guindy students as an initiative to help the needy parts of society from 2003.

=== Editions ===
Sangarsh 2003

Six motor vehicles were given to disabled staff & students of Anna University.

Sangarsh 2008 project succession stone

Sangarsh 2004

Through a play by Crazy Mohan a dramatist in Tamil Nadu 50,000 rupees fund raised and which was then donated to Cancer Institute at Adyar.

Sangarsh 2005

An audio visual library for the visually challenged students was set up at Madurai, Tamil Nadu to support the 120 blind students by the fund raised through Sangarsh '05.

Sangarsh 2008

To cater the needs of CSI Home, a home for rehabilitation of people affected by polio, 3 Lakh rupees was donated by the fund raised through Sangarsh '08.

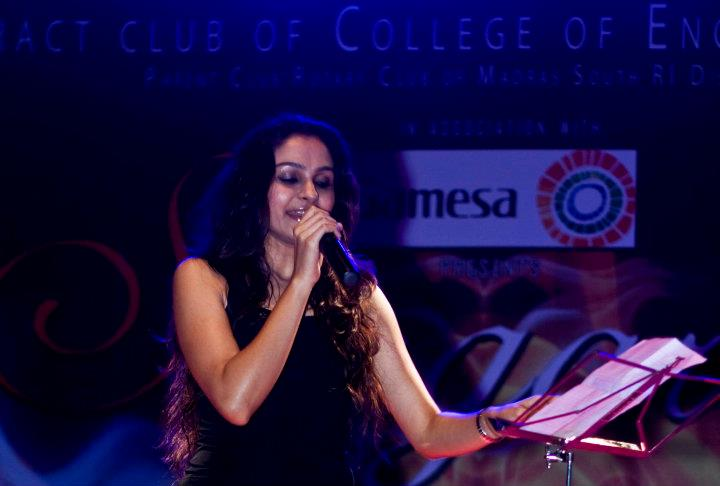
Andrea Jeremiah at Sangarsh 2011

Sangarsh 2010

Sangarsh '10 transformed the lives of 45 inmates of Shelter - A home for HIV infected kids by constructing a new home for their living by donating 4.25 Lakh rupees.

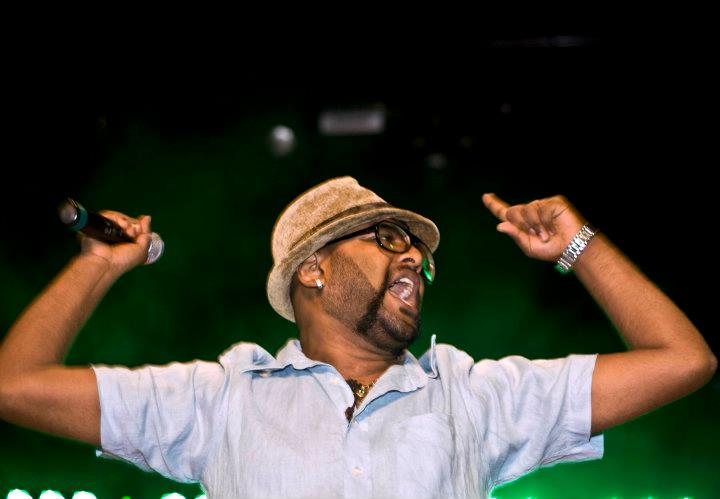
Benny Dayal at Sangarsh 2011

Sangarsh 2011

Sangarsh ’11 project was aimed at the inmates of Annai Shri Sharada Illam by renovating the infrastructure of home and providing sanitation facilities through a fund of 10 Lakhs. Also, a sum of $1000 was donated towards Rotary International for their Polio eradication program. Singers Andrea Jeremiah, Benny Dayal, Lady Kash and Krissy, Velmurugan, Mukesh participated & sang in the concert.

Sangarsh 2012

Renovating the infrastructure of Government High School, Thirumullaivoyal. Also a medical project was planned that is to support for pediatric heart surgeries of economically downtrodden children through Dr. Mani Children Heart Foundation. The concert was held on 1 April 2012 in Music Academy, Chennai. Singers Priya Himesh, Ranjith, Shwetha Mohan, Tippu Solar Sai participated and sang In Sangarsh'12.

Sangarsh 2013

Brought back the smile of the children in Thalassemia Welfare Association by donating for blood transfusions of the children in that association, Coimbatore. Also Renovated Saron Old Age Home, Namakkal by constructing living rooms and provided proper sanitation facilities for the inmates. The concert was held on 20 April 2013 in Music academy, Chennai. Singers Lady Kash, Ajeesh, Srinivas, Sakthisree Gopalan, Nikhil Matthew, Sharmila sang in the concert. The team under the leadership of Praveen Namakkal Mohankumar were able to successfully complete the project within a year and receive the Best Social Service project from the Rotary International.

Sangarsh 2014

Sangarsh '14 raised funds for the betterment of children of hemophilia society, Madras. The Concert which was held at the Music academy Alwarpet, included the performances of eminent music crew including Sakthishri gopalan, Tippu, Harihara Sudan, Pop Shalini, M.K Mukesh, A.L Ruflon.

Sangarsh 2015

Sangarsh '15 was organised for the sake of supporting the medication of Lysosomal storage disorder affected children. The Concert consisted of fabulous performances by Manasi, M.K Balaji, Pop Shalini, and Velmurugan and was held at the Music academy, Alwarpet.

Sangarsh 2016

Sangarsh'16 again for a good cause, aimed at the betterment of Paediatric acute Leukemia affected children, Ray of light foundation, Nungambakkam. The Music academy was dazzled by the music stars namely Nivas .K. Prassanna, Manasi, Jithin Raj, and Malavica.

Sangarsh 2017

Sangarsh '17 donated the proceeds towards the medication of Muscular dystrophy, Muscular dystrophy Foundation, Madurai. The day was made memorable by Anuradha Sriram, Syed Subahan, Jithin Raj, Pooja Vaithyanathan, Pradeep Kumar.

Sangarsh 2018

Recurrently this time, Sangarsh gave hands for the development of transport facilities and construction of new homes at Jayaram Karpagavalli Multipurpose Activities and Social Service Foundation, Madurai. The concert which was the source of funds included heart throbbing songsters namely V.V Prassanna, Syed Subahan, Malavica Sundar, Nikhil Mathew

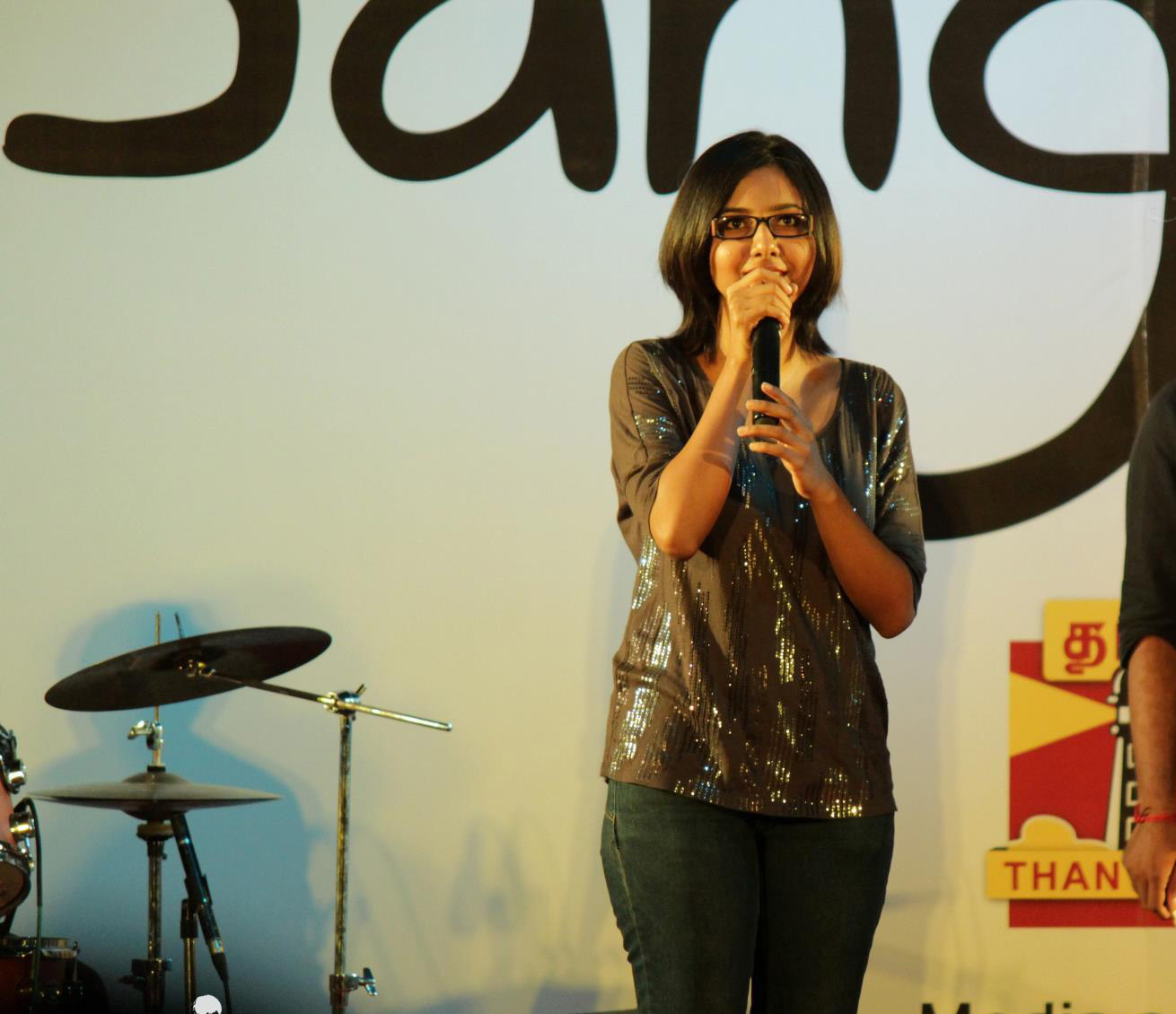
Sakthisree Gopalan at Sangarsh '13
