= Mu Sigma =

American data analytics company

Mu Sigma Inc.
- Type: Privately Owned
- Industry: Management consulting
- Founded: (2004)
- Founder: Dhiraj Rajaram
- Headquarters: Chicago, Illinois
- Services: Data analytics
- Number of employees: 3,500+ (2016)
- Website: www.mu-sigma.com

Mu Sigma is an American data analytics firm providing big data services, decision sciences and helping enterprises in data-driven decision making. The company headquartered in Chicago, Illinois partners with over 140 Fortune 500 companies to enhance their analytical and decision-making capabilities. The firm's name is derived from the statistical terms "Mu (μ)" and "Sigma (σ)" which symbolize the mean and the standard deviation, respectively, of a probability distribution.

== History ==
Mu Sigma was founded by Dhiraj Rajaram, a former strategy consultant at Booz Allen Hamilton and PricewaterhouseCoopers, in 2004. In 2008, Mu Sigma raised its first institutional investment round of $30 million from FTVentures (now FTV Capital). In April 2011, the company raised an additional $25 million from Sequoia Capital. In December 2011, the company announced a $108 million round of financing from Sequoia and growth equity investor General Atlantic. In February 2013, Mu Sigma received an investment of $45 million from MasterCard, which placed the company over the $1 billion (Rs. 5,400 crore (Note: At time of transaction)) milestone.

In early 2016, the company was sued by Aon Corp founder Pat Ryan, who discussed that Mu Sigma lowballed its own growth prospects in order to buy back Ryan's stake in the company.

In October 2016, after the divorce of Ambiga Subramanian, who was CEO at the time, Dhiraj Rajaram assumed the role.

== Locations ==
Mu Sigma is headquartered in Chicago, Illinois and has a global delivery centre in Bangalore. It also has an office in Austin, Texas.
