= Madras Observatory =

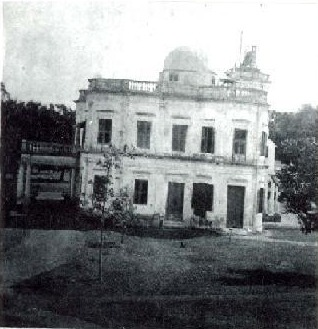
- Madras Observatory, 1880
- Observatory code: 223
- Location: Chennai, Chennai district, Tamil Nadu, India
- Coordinates: 13°04′05″N 80°14′48″E
- Location of Madras Observatory
- Related media on Commons

The Madras Observatory was an astronomical observatory which had its origins in a private observatory set up by William Petrie in 1786 and later moved and managed by the British East India Company from 1792 in Madras (now known as Chennai). The main purpose for establishing it was to assist in navigation and mapping by recording the latitude and maintaining time standards. In later years the observatory also made observations on stars and geomagnetism. The observatory ran from around 1792 to 1931 and a major work was the production of a comprehensive catalogue of stars.

== History ==
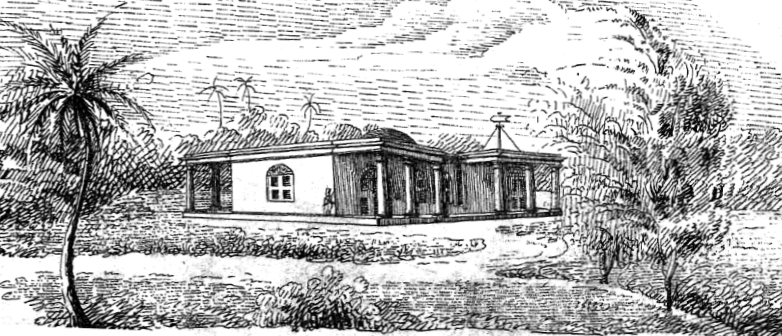
The observatory c. 1838

The observatory was established due to the efforts of William Petrie, an amateur astronomer who had a small private observatory at Egmore in Madras. Petrie's original observatory was established in 1786 and was made of iron and timber. In 1789, Petrie gifted his instruments to the Madras Government before retiring to England. Sir Charles Oakley accepted Petrie's plea to establish an official observatory for the purpose of "promoting the knowledge of astronomy, geography and navigation in India". The building was designed by Michael Topping on the bank of the river Cooum at Nungambakkam. The building consisted of a single room 12 metres (40 ft) long and 6 metres (20 ft) wide with a 5-metre (15 ft) ceiling. At the centre a granite pillar of 10 tons supported a 30-centimetre (12 in) azimuth transit circle instrument made by Troughton. These were used to make observations on the meridian that began on 9 January 1793. Topping died in 1796 and was succeeded by John Goldingham who was formerly Petrie's assistant, Government Architect and Editor of the Government Gazette apart from serving as first superintendent of the Engineering School. Goldingham determined the longitude as 80° 18' 30" based on eclipses of Jupiter's moons. This was the value used as a benchmark by William Lambton for the Great Trigonometrical Survey. When Goldingham went on leave between 1805 and 1810, the observatory was maintained by Lt. John Warren (born Jean-Baptiste Francois Joseph de Warren, 21 September 1769 – 9 February 1830, Pondicherry) who recalculated the longitude as 80°17'21"E. He recorded observations on the comet of September 1807 and computed the declinations of several stars. Goldingham returned in 1812 and served until 1830 when he was replaced by Thomas Glanville Taylor who measured the positions of 11,000 stars which were published in five volumes which came to be known as the "Madras Catalogue". Taylor's estimate of the longitude for Madras was 80°14'20"E. Taylor also made observations on the comet of 1831.

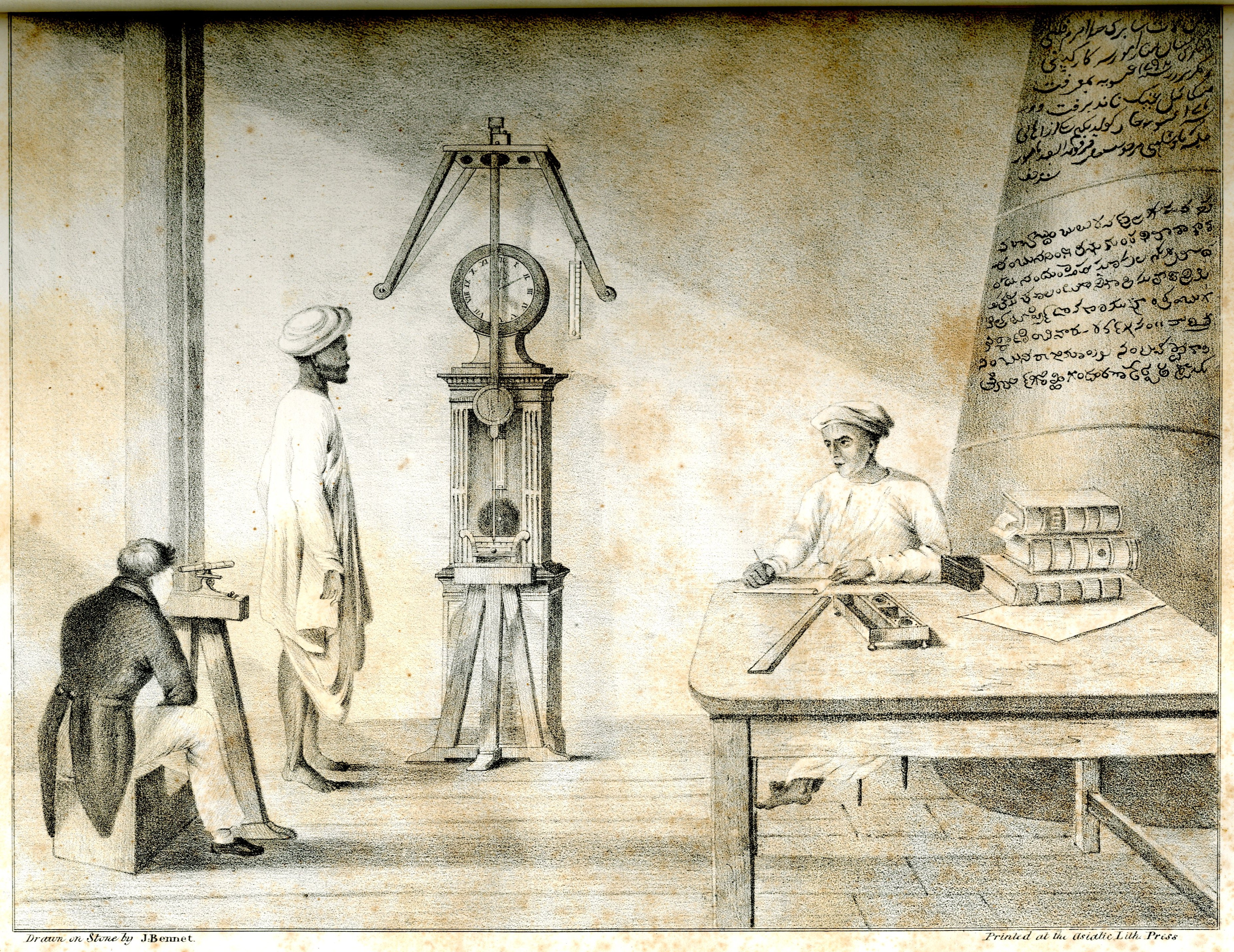
Inside of the Observatory in Goldingham's time

Taylor was replaced by Captain William Stephen Jacob in 1848, who continued the work on star positions. Jacob found orbital anomalies in the binary star 70 Ophiuchi that he claimed were evidence of a possible extrasolar planet. Major W.K. Worster held position briefly. From 1859 to 1861 Major J.F. Tennant was in charge of the observatory and magnetic observations began to be made using vertical force and declination magnetometers. In 1861, N. R. Pogson became astronomer. Pogson was assisted by C. Ragoonathachary. In 1872, an accurate clock was added to the observatory and a telegraph line between the observatory and Fort St George helped in accurate timing of a gun at noon and 8 pm. Three rooms were added for photography. Pogson was succeeded after his death by C. Michie Smith who moved to Kodaikanal to study solar physics in 1899 was replaced by R.L. Jones, professor of physics at Presidency College.

After this period only routine astronomy for time-keeping purposes was continued, as well as weather observations, and in 1931 the observatory was shut down. The granite pillar continues to stand and a more recent inscription has the "Madras Meridian" marked on it.

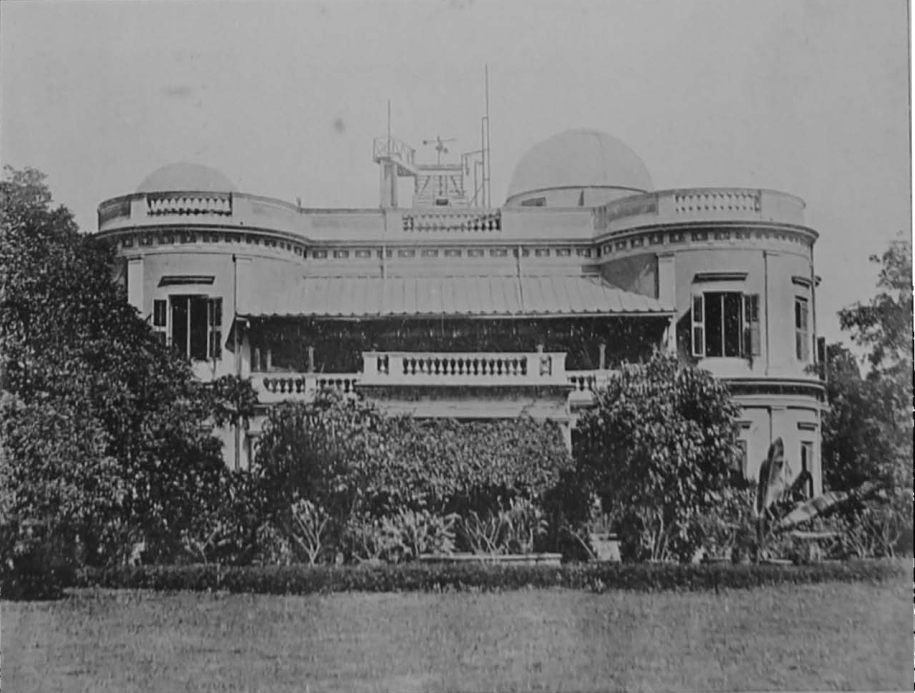
c. 1925

== See also ==
- List of astronomical observatories
