= William Stephen Jacob =

English astronomer in India

William Stephen Jacob (1813–1862) was an English immigrant astronomer in India, who acted as the director of the Madras Observatory from 1848 to 1859. His early claim of 1855 to have detected an exoplanet, in orbit around 70 Ophiuchi, is now thought to have been mistaken.

== Life ==
The seventh child of Stephen Long Jacob (1764–1851), vicar of Woolavington, Somerset, he was born at his father's vicarage on 19 November 1813; John Jacob (1812–1858) was his brother, and Sir George le Grand Jacob a cousin. He entered Addiscombe College as an East India Company cadet in 1828, passed for the engineers, and completed his military education at Royal Engineer Establishment, Chatham.

After Jacob's arrival at Bombay in 1831, he spent some years with the Great trigonometrical survey in the North-West Provinces, and established a private observatory at Pune in 1842. Bad health meant he took sick leave at the Cape of Good Hope. He became assistant to Andrew Scott Waugh, but again fell ill. In 1843 he went back to England on furlough, married in 1844, and returned in 1845 to India, but left the company's service on attaining the rank of captain in the Bombay engineers.

Jacob concentrated on science, and was appointed in December 1848 director of the Madras Observatory. In poor health, he was sent home on sick leave in 1854–5, and again in 1858–9. A transit-circle by William Simms arrived from England in March 1858, a month before he finally left the observatory, resigning on 13 October 1859.

For the solar eclipse of July 18, 1860, Jacob joined the official expedition to Spain aboard the steamer Himalaya. His project of erecting a mountain observatory at Pune was funded by parliament in 1862. He engaged to work there for three years with a 9-inch equatorial, his own purchase from Noël Paymal Lerebours, and landed at Bombay on 8 August, but died on reaching Pune on 16 August 1862, aged 48. He was elected a fellow of the Royal Astronomical Society in 1849.

== Works ==
Jacob presented to the Royal Astronomical Society in 1848 a catalogue of 244 double stars, observed at Pune with a 5-foot Dollond's equatorial. He computed orbits for several noted binaries, and discovered in 1847 that Pi Scorpii is a triple star.

In the Madras Observations for 1848–52 Jacob published a Subsidiary Catalogue of 1,440 Stars selected from the British Association Catalogue. His re-observation of 317 stars from the same collection in 1853–7 showed that large proper motions had been erroneously attributed to them; the instruments used were a 5-foot transit and a 4-foot mural circle, both by Dollond. The same volume contained 998 measures of 250 double stars made with an equatorial of 6.3 inches aperture constructed for Jacob by Lerebours in 1850. Attempted determinations of stellar parallax gave only the ostensible result of a parallax of 0″.06 for Alpha Herculis.

From his measures of the Saturnian and Jovian systems, printed at the expense of the Indian government, Jacob deduced elements for the satellites of Saturn and a corrected mass for Jupiter; and he noticed in 1852, almost simultaneously with William Lassell, the transparency of Saturn's "dusky ring". His planetary observations were reduced by James Breen in 1861.

His results of magnetic observations at Madras (1846–1850) were published by Jacob in 1854; those made under his superintendence (1851–1855) by N. R. Pogson in 1884. Jacob published in 1850 some Singapore meteorological observations (1841–5), and in 1857 those at Dodabetta (1851–5).

While in England in 1855 Jacob wrote "A few more words on the Plurality of Worlds" in which he suggested life on other planets ("probably that some of the known planets are inhabited, not very improbable that all of them are"), and described his computation of stellar orbits for the Royal Astronomical Society. Jacob posited that apparent orbital anomalies in the binary star 70 Ophiuchi might be caused by an exoplanet. While these anomalies are now thought to have other causes, this was the first serious claim by an astronomer to have detected an exoplanet using scientific methods: 100 years before the first exoplanet was conclusively detected and well before the science of exoplanets was even in its infancy. Professor David Kipping states that the ‘“claim is so remarkable because Jacob was making tiny measurements (80 milliarc seconds or 22 millionths of a degree) with the naked eye, at a time when he wasn’t even sure whether Newton’s law of gravity held sway in distant parts of the galaxy. While Jacob... was ultimately proved wrong, he had the audacity to try.”

== Family ==
Jacob married in 1844, Elizabeth, fourth daughter of Mathew Coates of Gainsborough, who survived him. They had six sons and two daughters.
