= List of named minor planets: A =

This is a partial list of named minor planets, containing all those starting with the letter A, as of 28 September 2026. It is ordered in a case-insensitive, alphabetical manner and contains a total of 1,864 entries. Grey minor planets have no article and redirect to the list of minor planets instead (see List of minor planets § Main index).

== A ==
- 594913 ꞌAylóꞌchaxnim
- 9605 A Coruña
- 3192 A'Hearn
- 274835 Aachen
- 20813 Aakashshah
- 26557 Aakritijain
- 28698 Aakshi
- 28828 Aalamiharandi
- 33181 Aalokpatwa
- 677 Aaltje
- 2676 Aarhus
- 129100 Aaronammons
- 22656 Aaronburrows
- 20722 Aaronclevenson
- 25677 Aaronenten
- 11451 Aarongolden
- 23113 Aaronhakim
- 34498 Aaronhannon
- 46083 Aaronkingery
- 12553 Aaronritter
- 13928 Aaronrogers
- 21933 Aaronrozon
- 29812 Aaronsolomon
- 3277 Aaronson
- 33448 Aaronyeiser
- 9836 Aarseth
- 2366 Aaryn
- 3654 AAS
- 864 Aase
- 2678 Aavasaksa
- 8900 AAVSO
- 10236 Aayushkaran
- 274302 Abaházi
- 4466 Abai
- 2722 Abalakin
- 1581 Abanderada
- 3480 Abante
- 4263 Abashiri
- 1390 Abastumani
- 741444 Abbasi
- 5224 Abbe
- 875129 Abbeyridgeobs
- 20087 Abbiedonaldson
- 17023 Abbott
- 31631 Abbywilliams
- 249010 Abdel-Samad
- 13264 Abdelhaq
- 15262 Abderhalden
- 22638 Abdulla
- 21483 Abdulrasool
- 419858 Abecheng
- 294600 Abedinabedin
- 5379 Abehiroshi
- 25410 Abejar
- 7428 Abekuniomi
- 3449 Abell
- 28829 Abelsky
- 8926 Abemasanao
- 13624 Abeosamu
- 5677 Aberdonia
- 12787 Abetadashi
- 2646 Abetti
- 9172 Abhramu
- 21411 Abifraeman
- 15559 Abigailhines
- 25422 Abigreene
- 24838 Abilunon
- 2671 Abkhazia
- 36624 Ablerus
- 5175 Ables
- 456 Abnoba
- 34259 Abprabhakaran
- 546025 Ábrahámpéter
- 19488 Abramcoley
- 9532 Abramenko
- 3409 Abramov
- 24520 Abramson
- 32056 Abrarnadroo
- 21850 Abshir
- 6805 Abstracta
- 9423 Abt
- 28831 Abu-Alshaikh
- 23768 Abu-Rmaileh
- 31466 Abualhassan
- 34038 Abualragheb
- 23587 Abukumado
- 79152 Abukumagawa
- 16413 Abulghazi
- 151 Abundantia
- 110300 Abusimbel
- 119993 Acabá
- 8652 Acacia
- 19524 Acaciacoleman
- 829 Academia
- 5547 Acadiau
- 2594 Acamas
- 6349 Acapulco
- 386618 Accomazzo
- 8833 Acer
- 21501 Acevedo
- 5126 Achaemenides
- 1150 Achaia
- 24121 Achandran
- 5144 Achates
- 588 Achilles
- 208996 Achlys
- 117430 Achosyx
- 9084 Achristou
- 22191 Achúcarro
- 6522 Aci
- 1821 Aconcagua
- 29747 Acorlando
- 18796 Acosta
- 28779 Acthieke
- 12238 Actor
- 12628 Acworthorr
- 523 Ada
- 20008 Adacarrera
- 7803 Adachi
- 576901 Adagio
- 591426 Adalawson
- 330 Adalberta
- 232923 Adalovelace
- 6461 Adam
- 20088 Adambattle
- 172525 Adamblock
- 28554 Adambowman
- 26737 Adambradley
- 4535 Adamcarolla
- 13286 Adamchauvin
- 10588 Adamcrandall
- 11685 Adamcurry
- 23306 Adamfields
- 31613 Adamgreenberg
- 227033 Adamjmckay
- 15581 Adamkelly
- 6146 Adamkrafft
- 15421 Adammalin
- 54391 Adammckay
- 34127 Adamnayak
- 28926 Adamnimoy
- 6537 Adamovich
- 13434 Adamquade
- 7655 Adamries
- 236305 Adamriess
- 1996 Adams
- 18142 Adamsidman
- 12838 Adamsmith
- 22551 Adamsolomon
- 18413 Adamspencer
- 20503 Adamtazi
- 101432 Adamwest
- 18084 Adamwohl
- 217472 Addams
- 6757 Addibischoff
- 19444 Addicott
- 27409 Addiedove
- 27286 Adedmondson
- 16883 Adeenedenton
- 525 Adelaide
- 812 Adele
- 647 Adelgunde
- 276 Adelheid
- 26386 Adelinacozma
- 229 Adelinda
- 60001 Adélka
- 117411 Adellehelble
- 145 Adeona
- 16228 Adhamkassem
- 175166 Adirondack
- 25642 Adiseshan
- 4401 Aditi
- 11372 Aditisingh
- 30175 Adityajain
- 31899 Adityamohan
- 24238 Adkerson
- 11519 Adler
- 398 Admete
- 85030 Admetos
- 17806 Adolfborn
- 608 Adolfine
- 20256 Adolfneckař
- 166570 Adolfträger
- 2101 Adonis
- 268 Adorea
- 21029 Adorno
- 239 Adrastea
- 143 Adria
- 820 Adriana
- 121236 Adrianagutierrez
- 17228 Adrianeliz
- 32008 Adriángalád
- 163255 Adrianhill
- 295492 Adrianprakhov
- 31569 Adriansonka
- 21758 Adrianveres
- 199991 Adriencoffinet
- 53127 Adrienklotz
- 6530 Adry
- 3646 Aduatiques
- 31474 Advaithanand
- 34256 Advaitpatil
- 23017 Advincula
- 17069 Adyantshankar
- 345648 Adyendre
- 1903 Adzhimushkaj
- 10237 Adzic
- 15420 Aedouglass
- 91 Aegina
- 96 Aegle
- 2401 Aehlita
- 159 Aemilia
- 1155 Aënna
- 10175 Aenona
- 396 Aeolia
- 264476 Aepic
- 369 Aëria
- 413033 Aerts
- 2876 Aeschylus
- 1027 Aesculapia
- 12608 Aesop
- 446 Aeternitas
- 132 Aethra
- 1064 Aethusa
- 1142 Aetolia
- 22993 Aferrari
- 27604 Affeldt
- 15467 Aflorsch
- 1187 Afra
- 1193 Africa
- 6391 Africano
- 34392 Afroz
- 3326 Agafonikov
- 14042 Agafonov
- 911 Agamemnon
- 5023 Agapenor
- 2267 Agassiz
- 13185 Agasthenes
- 221908 Agastrophus
- 111570 Ágasvár
- 7366 Agata
- 228 Agathe
- 31344 Agathon
- 3862 Agekian
- 4722 Agelaos
- 2470 Agematsu
- 1873 Agenor
- 7137 Ageo
- 598855 Agerer
- 27072 Aggarwal
- 152533 Aggas
- 21009 Agilkia
- 4392 Agita
- 47 Aglaja
- 20050 Aglaonice
- 641 Agnes
- 48846 Agnèsacker
- 118214 Agnesediboemia
- 16765 Agnesi
- 49109 Agnesraab
- 398188 Agni
- 847 Agnia
- 12848 Agostino
- 9503 Agrawain
- 15625 Agrawal
- 3212 Agricola
- 15372 Agrigento
- 645 Agrippina
- 8241 Agrius
- 28888 Agrusa
- 135978 Agüeros
- 1800 Aguilar
- 744 Aguntina
- 185578 Agustínelcasta
- 17984 Ahantonioli
- 21435 Aharon
- 24761 Ahau
- 21400 Ahdout
- 25638 Ahissar
- 11305 Ahlqvist
- 15634 Ahluwalia
- 34335 Ahmadismail
- 11179 Ahmadperez
- 16113 Ahmed
- 15155 Ahn
- 3181 Ahnert
- 2395 Aho
- 950 Ahrensa
- 2826 Ahti
- 21601 Aias
- 5908 Aichi
- 861 Aïda
- 92097 Aidai
- 978 Aidamina
- 31192 Aigoual
- 1918 Aiguillon
- 39860 Aiguoxiang
- 19913 Aigyptios
- 8864 Aikawa
- 661786 Aikman
- 26199 Aileenperry
- 28950 Ailisdooner
- 280652 Aimaku
- 24032 Aimeemcarthy
- 10853 Aimoto
- 20089 Áineobrien
- 4585 Ainonai
- 16713 Airashi
- 11104 Airion
- 17314 Aisakos
- 3584 Aisha
- 28484 Aishwarya
- 1568 Aisleen
- 28317 Aislinndeely
- 231666 Aisymnos
- 3070 Aitken
- 3787 Aivazovskij
- 83598 Aiweiwei
- 31469 Aizawa
- 5458 Aizman
- 14701 Aizu
- 19315 Aizunisshinkan
- 14820 Aizuyaichi
- 1404 Ajax
- 30055 Ajaysaini
- 19564 Ajburnetti
- 8046 Ajiki
- 26544 Ajjarapu
- 589780 Ajka
- 249302 Ajoie
- 22619 Ajscheetz
- 175562 Ajsingh
- 16999 Ajstewart
- 46590 Akabeko
- 6422 Akagi
- 21033 Akahirakiyozo
- 53157 Akaishidake
- 4584 Akan
- 28832 Akana
- 5741 Akanemaruta
- 19197 Akasaki
- 7418 Akasegawa
- 5881 Akashi
- 456378 Akashikaikyo
- 4949 Akasofu
- 62152 Akatsuki
- 24965 Akayu
- 39723 Akazawa
- 34665 Akbarwhizin
- 30195 Akdemir
- 11533 Akebäck
- 12349 Akebonozou
- 8686 Akenside
- 11306 Åkesson
- 326290 Akhenaten
- 25966 Akhilmathew
- 3067 Akhmatova
- 5101 Akhmerov
- 35093 Akicity
- 13691 Akie
- 8490 Akiehashimoto
- 23727 Akihasan
- 16518 Akihikoito
- 7830 Akihikotago
- 5355 Akihiro
- 8047 Akikinoshita
- 9985 Akiko
- 9450 Akikoizumo
- 23895 Akikonakamura
- 8321 Akim
- 10633 Akimasa
- 11928 Akimotohiro
- 4521 Akimov
- 6658 Akiraabe
- 10196 Akiraarai
- 3872 Akirafujii
- 5782 Akirafujiwara
- 55223 Akiraifukube
- 8187 Akiramisawa
- 8232 Akiramizuno
- 9865 Akiraohta
- 87312 Akirasuzuki
- 37729 Akiratakao
- 40795 Akiratsuchiyama
- 8182 Akita
- 10727 Akitsushima
- 28345 Akivabarnun
- 2153 Akiyama
- 6792 Akiyamatakashi
- 164406 Akiyamatoshio
- 15868 Akiyoshidai
- 8034 Akka
- 5679 Akkado
- 4797 Ako
- 9549 Akplatonov
- 23975 Akran
- 26447 Akrishnan
- 4777 Aksenov
- 2067 Aksnes
- 7385 Aktsynovia
- 10164 Akusekijima
- 13498 Al Chwarizmi
- 7060 Al-ʻIjliya
- 9936 Al-Biruni
- 7057 Al-Fārābī
- 11156 Al-Khwarismi
- 7058 Al-Ṭūsī
- 763533 Alabiano
- 54521 Aladdin
- 9243 Alag
- 31470 Alagappan
- 738 Alagasta
- 260508 Alagna
- 1969 Alain
- 13534 Alain-Fournier
- 34304 Alainagarza
- 33163 Alainaspect
- 24988 Alainmilsztajn
- 2927 Alamosa
- 15131 Alanalda
- 14158 Alananderson
- 333224 Alanarosejohnson
- 29137 Alanboss
- 9291 Alanburdick
- 4420 Alandreev
- 14333 Alanfischer
- 4151 Alanhale
- 20259 Alanhoffman
- 24898 Alanholmes
- 88270 Alanhoward
- 327030 Alanmaclure
- 6227 Alanrubin
- 25979 Alansage
- 17225 Alanschorn
- 20341 Alanstack
- 117565 Alanstrauss
- 10113 Alantitle
- 342764 Alantitus
- 21330 Alanwhitman
- 2500 Alascattalo
- 19148 Alaska
- 200069 Alastor
- 702 Alauda
- 111468 Alba Regia
- 5576 Albanese
- 31468 Albastaki
- 333551 Albaugh
- 10051 Albee
- 8439 Albellus
- 10186 Albéniz
- 719 Albert
- 85168 Albertacentenary
- 26462 Albertcui
- 543081 Albertducrocq
- 218274 Albertferenc
- 1290 Albertine
- 10950 Albertjansen
- 19718 Albertjarvis
- 5371 Albertoaccomazzi
- 58373 Albertoalonso
- 80652 Albertoangela
- 50271 Albertoanunziato
- 21395 Albertofilho
- 69585 Albertoraugei
- 83657 Albertosordi
- 60406 Albertosuci
- 21413 Albertsao
- 21623 Albertshieh
- 20006 Albertus Magnus
- 15619 Albertwu
- 175419 Albiesachs
- 8594 Albifrons
- 20090 Albin
- 2697 Albina
- 8005 Albinadubois
- 27269 Albinocarbognani
- 7903 Albinoni
- 15760 Albion
- 7671 Albis
- 344581 Albisetti
- 1783 Albitskij
- 10656 Albrecht
- 34281 Albritton
- 52670 Alby
- 12607 Alcaeus
- 599755 Alcarràs
- 2241 Alcathous
- 8596 Alchata
- 8549 Alcide
- 360072 Alcimedon
- 11428 Alcinoös
- 3174 Alcock
- 22899 Alconrad
- 16645 Aldalara
- 44103 Aldana
- 13004 Aldaz
- 2941 Alden
- 17921 Aldeobaldia
- 26533 Aldering
- 17019 Aldo
- 600539 Aldoatiglio
- 34559 Aldossary
- 10758 Aldoushuxley
- 6470 Aldrin
- 27656 Aleblain
- 14832 Alechinsky
- 33413 Alecsun
- 34511 Aleenasaji
- 15379 Alefranz
- 598719 Alegalli
- 23436 Alekfursenko
- 1909 Alekhin
- 352655 Alekna
- 7222 Alekperov
- 2711 Aleksandrov
- 9933 Alekseev
- 9533 Aleksejleonov
- 623826 Alekseyvarkin
- 7910 Aleksola
- 465 Alekto
- 418 Alemannia
- 82153 Alemigliorini
- 28646 Alemran
- 12061 Alena
- 22842 Alenashort
- 58682 Alenašolcová
- 16683 Alepieri
- 13128 Aleppo
- 5185 Alerossi
- 70745 Aleserpieri
- 181661 Alessandro
- 145966 Alessandroilari
- 185039 Alessiapossenti
- 300124 Alessiazecchini
- 78309 Alessielisa
- 243381 Alessio
- 51874 Alessiosquilloni
- 13704 Aletesi
- 259 Aletheia
- 27083 Alethialittle
- 1194 Aletta
- 69231 Alettajacobs
- 3367 Alex
- 21422 Alexacarey
- 22942 Alexacourtis
- 296907 Alexander
- 50428 Alexanderdessler
- 190617 Alexandergerst
- 635817 Alexanderkann
- 25426 Alexanderkim
- 30310 Alexanderlin
- 34144 Alexandersun
- 548263 Alexandertutov
- 7660 Alexanderwilson
- 25645 Alexanderyan
- 54 Alexandra
- 14950 Alexandradelbo
- 333134 Alexandrahilbert
- 404016 Alexandralabenz
- 127955 Alexandraradu
- 346261 Alexandrescu
- 8969 Alexandrinus
- 32768 Alexandripatov
- 91335 Alexandrov
- 788764 Alexandrumironov
- 814148 Alexandrupop
- 21986 Alexanduribe
- 218866 Alexantioch
- 333597 Alexbjurstrom
- 17073 Alexblank
- 28453 Alexcecil
- 21461 Alexchernyak
- 23162 Alexcrook
- 33971 Alexdavis
- 12955 Alexdekoter
- 3771 Alexejtolstoj
- 28795 Alexelbert
- 263516 Alexescu
- 17193 Alexeybaran
- 299785 Alexeymolchanov
- 33931 Alexeysergeyev
- 14220 Alexgibbs
- 333717 Alexgreaves
- 24130 Alexhuang
- 31951 Alexisallen
- 12906 Alexismacavoy
- 17119 Alexisrodrz
- 31389 Alexkaplan
- 15021 Alexkardon
- 25701 Alexkeeler
- 9321 Alexkonopliv
- 15032 Alexlevin
- 321453 Alexmarieann
- 129068 Alexmay
- 48842 Alexmazzanti
- 33974 Alexmeyer
- 14335 Alexosipov
- 345842 Alexparker
- 28444 Alexrabii
- 23307 Alexramek
- 11781 Alexroberts
- 568092 Alexschmid
- 30190 Alexshelby
- 712499 Alexstefanescu
- 24608 Alexveselkov
- 22517 Alexzanardi
- 17130 Alexzhang
- 18935 Alfandmedina
- 1191 Alfaterna
- 230765 Alfbester
- 3884 Alferov
- 20048 Alfianello
- 553532 Alfiejohnpercy
- 15258 Alfilipenko
- 22577 Alfiuccio
- 233707 Alfons
- 1375 Alfreda
- 11765 Alfredfowler
- 24907 Alfredhaar
- 11769 Alfredjoy
- 189000 Alfredkubin
- 128585 Alfredmaria
- 20091 Alfredoescalante
- 13058 Alfredstevens
- 12057 Alfredsturm
- 1778 Alfvén
- 1213 Algeria
- 26368 Alghunaim
- 202092 Algirdas
- 1394 Algoa
- 929 Algunde
- 3851 Alhambra
- 31926 Alhamood
- 59239 Alhazen
- 18812 Aliadler
- 9426 Aliante
- 474640 Alicanto
- 291 Alice
- 146040 Alicebowman
- 18825 Alicechai
- 34332 Alicefeng
- 21497 Alicehine
- 20109 Alicelandis
- 14513 Alicelindner
- 32597 Alicelucchetti
- 4751 Alicemanning
- 34797 Alicemartynova
- 5951 Alicemonet
- 50727 Aliceverett
- 56678 Alicewessen
- 133536 Alicewhagel
- 34279 Alicezhang
- 26005 Alicezhao
- 11123 Aliciaclaire
- 20176 Aliciagoyena
- 13281 Aliciahall
- 18737 Aliciaworley
- 13046 Aliev
- 1567 Alikoski
- 10678 Alilagoa
- 11422 Alilienthal
- 301552 Alimenti
- 58097 Alimov
- 21684 Alinafiocca
- 887 Alinda
- 121542 Alindamashiku
- 266 Aline
- 21657 Alinecarter
- 55913 Alinedupin
- 8651 Alineraynal
- 214136 Alinghi
- 79382 Aliprandi
- 108140 Alir
- 14225 Alisahamilton
- 2526 Alisary
- 321131 Alishan
- 27091 Alisonbick
- 7517 Alisondoane
- 17813 Alisonhuenger
- 21558 Alisonliu
- 16023 Alisonyee
- 153301 Alissamearle
- 15891 Alissazhang
- 15819 Alisterling
- 20017 Alixcatherine
- 192686 Aljuroma
- 124 Alkeste
- 12714 Alkimos
- 4592 Alkissia
- 82 Alkmene
- 11169 Alkon
- 658787 Alksnis
- 3037 Alku
- 135979 Allam
- 13490 Allanchapman
- 70715 Allancheuvront
- 11414 Allanchu
- 4419 Allancook
- 171153 Allanrahill
- 633326 Allashapovalova
- 65852 Alle
- 457 Alleghenia
- 11348 Allegra
- 19727 Allen
- 48643 Allen-Beach
- 32579 Allendavia
- 33450 Allender
- 22995 Allenjanes
- 32276 Allenliu
- 136432 Allenlunsford
- 18983 Allentran
- 28483 Allenyuan
- 24680 Alleven
- 14182 Alley
- 20834 Allihewlett
- 20852 Allilandstrom
- 25364 Allisonbaas
- 16185 Allisonjia
- 22174 Allisonmae
- 31597 Allisonmarie
- 20092 Allisonmcgraw
- 19439 Allisontjong
- 21694 Allisowilson
- 24274 Alliswheeler
- 102617 Allium
- 13579 Allodd
- 20158 Allton
- 20271 Allygoldberg
- 390 Alma
- 4339 Almamater
- 256796 Almanzor
- 191856 Almáriván
- 13446 Almarkim
- 11606 Almary
- 546515 Almásy
- 634624 Almazgaleev
- 17040 Almeida
- 5879 Almeria
- 15676 Almoisheev
- 31633 Almonte
- 3045 Alois
- 367488 Aloisortner
- 15230 Alona
- 31559 Alonmillet
- 73533 Alonso
- 9995 Alouette
- 11824 Alpaidze
- 13217 Alpbach
- 100122 Alpes-Maritimes
- 111933 Alphonsetardif
- 925 Alphonsina
- 23608 Alpiapuane
- 25898 Alpoge
- 100735 Alpomořanská
- 7269 Alprokhorov
- 10957 Alps
- 10478 Alsabti
- 971 Alsatia
- 1617 Alschmitt
- 33535 Alshaikh
- 31922 Alsharif
- 955 Alstede
- 12621 Alsufi
- 2232 Altaj
- 7742 Altamira
- 8121 Altdorfer
- 9336 Altenburg
- 8832 Altenrath
- 4857 Altgamia
- 119 Althaea
- 46110 Altheamoorhead
- 31031 Altiplano
- 148780 Altjira
- 850 Altona
- 117156 Altschwendt
- 4104 Alu
- 2508 Alupka
- 2353 Alva
- 27363 Alvanclark
- 3581 Alvarez
- 20657 Alvarez-Candal
- 3567 Alvema
- 6996 Alvensleben
- 13677 Alvin
- 104698 Alvindrew
- 7248 Älvsjö
- 1169 Alwine
- 80451 Alwoods
- 14331 Alyankovic
- 75829 Alyea
- 16114 Alyono
- 7959 Alysecherri
- 235403 Alysenregiec
- 24331 Alyshaowen
- 23783 Alyssachan
- 23792 Alyssacook
- 34741 Alyssakeirn
- 21924 Alyssaovaitt
- 16788 Alyssarose
- 26332 Alyssehrlich
- 233661 Alytus
- 37529 Ama-Miyayama
- 44821 Amadora
- 11716 Amahartman
- 650 Amalasuntha
- 18169 Amaldi
- 284 Amalia
- 24890 Amaliafinzi
- 113 Amalthea
- 725 Amanda
- 25742 Amandablanco
- 19122 Amandabosh
- 56795 Amandagorman
- 10607 Amandahatton
- 6813 Amandahendrix
- 19857 Amandajane
- 31727 Amandalewis
- 26013 Amandalonzo
- 20415 Amandalu
- 157693 Amandamarty
- 19467 Amandanagy
- 14805 Amandaostwald
- 19465 Amandarusso
- 12595 Amandashaw
- 9525 Amandasickafoose
- 231675 Amandastadermann
- 34177 Amandawilson
- 11688 Amandugan
- 6247 Amanogawa
- 120462 Amanohashidate
- 14172 Amanolivere
- 16148 Amaraifeji
- 34357 Amaraorth
- 3762 Amaravella
- 1085 Amaryllis
- 4161 Amasis
- 9667 Amastrinc
- 1035 Amata
- 10385 Amaterasu
- 19183 Amati
- 32891 Amatrice
- 1042 Amazone
- 1905 Ambartsumian
- 34189 Ambatipudi
- 2933 Amber
- 21431 Amberhess
- 33337 Amberyang
- 3519 Ambiorix
- 25301 Ambrofogar
- 23858 Ambrosesoehn
- 193 Ambrosia
- 27413 Ambruster
- 30596 Amdeans
- 14012 Amedee
- 986 Amelia
- 23213 Ameliachang
- 304122 Ameliawehlau
- 3471 Amelin
- 18020 Amend
- 5010 Amenemhêt
- 4847 Amenhotep
- 10804 Amenouzume
- 916 America
- 6278 Ametkhan
- 9509 Amfortas
- 516 Amherstia
- 18675 Amiamini
- 3809 Amici
- 367 Amicitia
- 12100 Amiens
- 32007 Amirhelmy
- 34592 Amirtharaj
- 31901 Amitscheer
- 601227 Ammann
- 39678 Ammannito
- 871 Amneris
- 2437 Amnestia
- 32062 Amolpunjabi
- 11380 Amolsingh
- 1221 Amor
- 58214 Amorim
- 8721 AMOS
- 2948 Amosov
- 198 Ampella
- 10183 Ampère
- 10247 Amphiaraos
- 5244 Amphilochos
- 5652 Amphimachus
- 37519 Amphios
- 29 Amphitrite
- 181483 Ampleforth
- 46513 Ampzing
- 20644 Amritdas
- 11945 Amsterdam
- 3554 Amun
- 1065 Amundsenia
- 26003 Amundson
- 17452 Amurreka
- 3375 Amy
- 120188 Amyaqueche
- 97471 Amybrenton
- 26414 Amychyao
- 55576 Amycus
- 22679 Amydavid
- 33562 Amydunphy
- 541842 Amygreaves
- 30147 Amyhammer
- 34199 Amyjin
- 63862 Amyledbetter
- 9274 Amylovell
- 234750 Amymainzer
- 26653 Amymeyer
- 10060 Amymilne
- 22865 Amymoffett
- 12396 Amyphillips
- 175563 Amyrose
- 84994 Amysimon
- 23904 Amytang
- 5560 Amytis
- 29969 Amyvitha
- 275281 Amywalsh
- 31777 Amywinegar
- 29983 Amyxu
- 8289 An-Eefje
- 342844 Anabel
- 16602 Anabuki
- 8834 Anacardium
- 30575 Anacarolina
- 819915 Anacastañeda
- 980 Anacostia
- 2339 Anacreon
- 11441 Anadiego
- 39677 Anagaribaldi
- 3757 Anagolay
- 270 Anahita
- 19860 Anahtar
- 34680 Anahumphrey
- 17226 Anaiahbre
- 237693 Anakovacicek
- 3848 Analucia
- 21560 Analyons
- 17008 Anamariaperez
- 181043 Anan
- 23323 Anand
- 30269 Anandapadmanaban
- 31635 Anandarao
- 9194 Ananoff
- 28808 Ananthnarayan
- 24474 Ananthram
- 15500 Anantpatel
- 32611 Ananyaganesh
- 10238 Ananyakarthik
- 25721 Anartya
- 824 Anastasia
- 20477 Anastroda
- 11166 Anatolefrance
- 3286 Anatoliya
- 207653 Anatolymokrenko
- 19539 Anaverdu
- 4180 Anaxagoras
- 6006 Anaximandros
- 6051 Anaximenes
- 330455 Anbrysse
- 21801 Ančerl
- 18263 Anchialos
- 1173 Anchises
- 14088 Ancus
- 15735 Andakerkhoven
- 266465 Andalucia
- 10719 Andamar
- 6013 Andanike
- 27385 Andblonsky
- 2788 Andenne
- 4815 Anders
- 2476 Andersen
- 7813 Anderserikson
- 689822 Anderson
- 31412 Andersonribeiro
- 138200 Anderswall
- 26429 Andiwagner
- 25093 Andmikhaylov
- 6424 Ando
- 43870 Andokazuko
- 27787 Andokazuma
- 20003 Andorfer
- 13608 Andosatoru
- 21121 Andoshoeki
- 42403 Andraimon
- 8151 Andranada
- 11459 Andráspál
- 722063 Andrasz
- 185580 Andratx
- 2175 Andrea Doria
- 21891 Andreabocelli
- 204816 Andreacamilleri
- 149270 Andreacimatti
- 31961 Andreaferrero
- 44368 Andreafrigo
- 20157 Andreaharrington
- 95474 Andreajbarbieri
- 17830 Andreajurgens
- 29657 Andreali
- 96876 Andreamanna
- 26575 Andreapugh
- 22021 Andreariley
- 8164 Andreasdoppler
- 17459 Andreashofer
- 145566 Andreasphilipp
- 367404 Andreasrebers
- 42733 Andrébaranne
- 1296 Andrée
- 4199 Andreev
- 549418 Andreifesenko
- 20284 Andreilevin
- 817120 Andreirăzvan
- 5761 Andreivanov
- 14040 Andrejka
- 8477 Andrejkiselev
- 808162 Andrejsērglis
- 11244 Andrékuipers
- 116166 Andrémaeder
- 2282 Andrés Bello
- 6159 Andréseloy
- 28525 Andrewabboud
- 20093 Andrewalberini
- 79353 Andrewalday
- 32132 Andrewamini
- 21778 Andrewarren
- 208915 Andrewashcraft
- 5280 Andrewbecker
- 34616 Andrewbennett
- 17143 Andrewbrinton
- 33691 Andrewchiang
- 20094 Andrewcoates
- 18159 Andrewcook
- 652509 Andrewcrossley
- 6947 Andrewdavis
- 90471 Andrewdrake
- 563853 Andrewdubeyjames
- 121327 Andreweaker
- 289085 Andreweil
- 229255 Andrewelliott
- 34234 Andrewfang
- 28351 Andrewfeldman
- 333097 Andrewgardner
- 25679 Andrewguo
- 15635 Andrewhager
- 17962 Andrewherron
- 28167 Andrewkim
- 34245 Andrewkomo
- 17956 Andrewlenoir
- 129096 Andrewleung
- 121505 Andrewliounis
- 27197 Andrewliu
- 129338 Andrewlowman
- 26266 Andrewmerrill
- 23679 Andrewmoore
- 10230 Andrewnorton
- 23153 Andrewnowell
- 78430 Andrewpearce
- 215905 Andrewpoppe
- 53629 Andrewpotter
- 31985 Andrewryan
- 19424 Andrewsong
- 34069 Andrewsteele
- 11001 Andrewulff
- 173872 Andrewwest
- 3413 Andriana
- 34551 Andrianova
- 7721 Andrillat
- 42748 Andrisani
- 8048 Andrle
- 5027 Androgeos
- 175 Andromache
- 2294 Andronikov
- 11003 Andronov
- 133293 Andrushivka
- 51915 Andry
- 21336 Andyblanchard
- 28652 Andybramante
- 8257 Andycheng
- 126906 Andykulessa
- 20095 Andylopezoquendo
- 5441 Andymurray
- 184011 Andypuckett
- 25300 Andyromine
- 17399 Andysanto
- 29880 Andytran
- 1172 Äneas
- 10456 Anechka
- 20773 Aneeshvenkat
- 320790 Anestin
- 9991 Anežka
- 7468 Anfimov
- 3158 Anga
- 1957 Angara
- 30788 Angekauffmann
- 11911 Angel
- 28822 Angelabarker
- 129151 Angelaboggs
- 274137 Angelaglinos
- 16132 Angelakim
- 30031 Angelakong
- 22064 Angelalewis
- 9428 Angelalouise
- 136100 Angelamisiano
- 25402 Angelanorse
- 31838 Angelarob
- 27580 Angelataylor
- 26947 Angelawang
- 23057 Angelawilson
- 26002 Angelayeung
- 28503 Angelazhang
- 213269 Angelbarbero
- 965 Angelica
- 20643 Angelicaliu
- 64 Angelina
- 16881 Angelinmathew
- 20137 Àngeljorba
- 19506 Angellopez
- 102211 Angelofaggiano
- 9011 Angelou
- 12617 Angelusilesius
- 3160 Angerhofer
- 371220 Angers
- 754258 Anghel
- 648709 Angissimo
- 16770 Angkor Wat
- 64291 Anglee
- 698609 Angli
- 1712 Angola
- 18102 Angrilli
- 8420 Angrogna
- 42487 Ångström
- 9560 Anguita
- 8593 Angustirostris
- 6120 Anhalt
- 2162 Anhui
- 791 Ani
- 28620 Anicia
- 34164 Anikacheerla
- 3358 Anikushin
- 129078 Animoo
- 32296 Aninsayana
- 27434 Anirudhjain
- 230759 Anishahosadurga
- 25455 Anissamak
- 187410 Anitabrockie
- 301263 Anitaheward
- 6486 Anitahill
- 46686 Anitasohus
- 170012 Anithakar
- 1016 Anitra
- 8060 Anius
- 34634 Anjalichadha
- 8820 Anjandersen
- 31663 Anjani
- 362177 Anji
- 26057 Ankaios
- 1457 Ankara
- 28428 Ankurvaishnav
- 34647 Ankushdhawan
- 25799 Anmaschlegel
- 265 Anna
- 595583 Annabelcarun
- 127415 Annacalderara
- 112492 Annacipriani
- 34331 Annadu
- 100733 Annafalcká
- 11299 Annafreud
- 15014 Annagekker
- 2519 Annagerman
- 32731 Annaivanovna
- 24930 Annajamison
- 20180 Annakolény
- 34193 Annakoonce
- 85515 Annakukharskaya
- 7787 Annalaura
- 20014 Annalisa
- 20160 Annałosiak
- 27613 Annalou
- 579742 Annamareike
- 31920 Annamcevoy
- 32402 Annametke
- 31104 Annanetrebko
- 552746 Annanobili
- 9823 Annantalová
- 3055 Annapavlova
- 516560 Annapolisroyal
- 34830 Annaquinlan
- 27150 Annasante
- 26948 Annasato
- 34558 Annasavelyeva
- 34855 Annaspektor
- 25760 Annaspitz
- 555092 Annasusanne
- 100734 Annasvídnická
- 574742 Annatsybuleva
- 18707 Annchi
- 25512 Anncomins
- 24316 Anncooper
- 15042 Anndavgui
- 3667 Anne-Marie
- 178830 Anne-Véronique
- 154998 Anneadkins
- 45511 Anneblack
- 39429 Annebrontë
- 380832 Annecambridge
- 5535 Annefrank
- 18244 Anneila
- 15509 Annejing
- 329025 Annekathrin
- 21739 Annekeschwob
- 12028 Annekinney
- 17904 Annekoupal
- 27169 Annelabruzzo
- 7330 Annelemaître
- 910 Anneliese
- 26235 Annemaduggan
- 27110 Annemaryvonne
- 30040 Annemerrill
- 286841 Annemieke
- 3724 Annenskij
- 12527 Anneraugh
- 3664 Anneres
- 2839 Annette
- 22137 Annettelee
- 376084 Annettepeter
- 20206 Annewellbrock
- 48774 Anngower
- 261109 Annie
- 28559 Anniedai
- 155290 Anniegrauer
- 50726 Anniemaunder
- 58895 Annierobin
- 13343 Annietaylor
- 5400 Anniewalker
- 817 Annika
- 28744 Annikagustafsson
- 16954 Annikamorgan
- 30193 Annikaurban
- 137165 Annis
- 9774 Annjudge
- 30396 Annleonard
- 25511 Annlipinsky
- 23018 Annmoriarty
- 8835 Annona
- 2572 Annschnell
- 17835 Anoelsuri
- 4109 Anokhin
- 8564 Anomalocaris
- 9611 Anouck
- 292872 Anoushankar
- 46737 Anpanman
- 40023 ANPCEN
- 9996 ANS
- 647779 Ansari
- 12033 Anselmo
- 8435 Anser
- 3136 Anshan
- 107074 Ansonsylva
- 43436 Ansschut
- 6717 Antal
- 2404 Antarctica
- 17494 Antaviana
- 198592 Antbernal
- 2207 Antenor
- 176981 Anteradonić
- 1943 Anteros
- 22729 Anthennig
- 223879 Anthonyegan
- 403491 Anthonygrayling
- 33703 Anthonyhill
- 30412 Anthonylagain
- 24289 Anthonypalma
- 211374 Anthonyrose
- 285937 Anthonytaylor
- 53005 Antibes
- 7214 Anticlus
- 129 Antigone
- 651 Antikleia
- 1583 Antilochus
- 9828 Antimachos
- 26232 Antink
- 1863 Antinous
- 90 Antiope
- 8319 Antiphanes
- 13463 Antiphos
- 6614 Antisthenes
- 53843 Antjiekrog
- 55897 Antoinecailleau
- 3686 Antoku
- 84120 Antonacci
- 300334 Antonalexander
- 361764 Antonbuslov
- 7957 Antonella
- 27864 Antongraff
- 11657 Antonhajduk
- 272 Antonia
- 42593 Antoniazzi
- 551601 Antonijové
- 6692 Antonínholý
- 12580 Antonini
- 301794 Antoninkapustin
- 114613 Antoninobrosio
- 822844 Antoniogonález
- 292459 Antoniolasciac
- 16744 Antonioleone
- 20049 Antoniopresti
- 19783 Antoniromanya
- 65357 Antoniucci
- 535353 Antoniwilk
- 400308 Antonkutter
- 14317 Antonov
- 660931 Antonpetrov
- 20480 Antonschraut
- 34141 Antonwu
- 249061 Antonyberger
- 26122 Antonysutton
- 1294 Antwerpia
- 12619 Anubelshunu
- 30027 Anubhavguha
- 1912 Anubis
- 16092 Anudeepgolla
- 700094 Anunciação
- 185325 Anupabhagwat
- 12072 Anupamakotha
- 311231 Anuradhapura
- 15989 Anusha
- 31725 Anushazaman
- 34154 Anushkanair
- 16028 Anushree
- 30295 Anvitagupta
- 34802 Anwesha
- 30323 Anyam
- 3575 Anyuta
- 2061 Anza
- 24414 Anzhenhosp
- 697402 Ao
- 4292 Aoba
- 200003 Aokeda
- 5337 Aoki
- 2341 Aoluta
- 41000 Aomawa
- 19701 Aomori
- 3810 Aoraki
- 4094 Aoshima
- 3400 Aotearoa
- 9886 Aoyagi
- 11258 Aoyama
- 18639 Aoyunzhiyuanzhe
- 90022 Apache Point
- 134130 Apáczai
- 28598 Apadmanabha
- 159215 Apan
- 4232 Aparicio
- 8273 Apatheia
- 5885 Apeldoorn
- 121725 Aphidas
- 1388 Aphrodite
- 19139 Apian
- 32811 Apisaon
- 29214 Apitzsch
- 132524 APL
- 10780 Apollinaire
- 1862 Apollo
- 12609 Apollodoros
- 358 Apollonia
- 99942 Apophis
- 3190 Aposhanskij
- 6710 Apostel
- 988 Appella
- 10959 Appennino
- 1768 Appenzella
- 34282 Applegate
- 44694 Aprilhinton
- 25714 Aprillee
- 33845 Aprilrussell
- 9393 Apta
- 12606 Apuleius
- 11322 Aquamarine
- 631202 Aquarellia
- 8836 Aquifolium
- 1063 Aquilegia
- 107052 Aquincum
- 387 Aquitania
- 849 Ara
- 100731 Ara Pacis
- 35169 Araake
- 15144 Araas
- 841 Arabella
- 1157 Arabia
- 1087 Arabis
- 407 Arachne
- 66669 Aradac
- 1005 Arago
- 5070 Arai
- 21082 Araimasaru
- 4718 Araki
- 7502 Arakida
- 8707 Arakihiroshi
- 973 Aralia
- 227962 Aramis
- 9384 Aransio
- 89973 Aranyjános
- 96205 Ararat
- 20038 Arasaki
- 18644 Arashiyama
- 12152 Aratus
- 15810 Arawn
- 16077 Arayhamilton
- 128474 Arbacia
- 25412 Arbesfeld
- 1020 Arcadia
- 14622 Arcadiopoveda
- 6645 Arcetri
- 9860 Archaeopteryx
- 33607 Archanamurali
- 33328 Archanaverma
- 4030 Archenhold
- 65590 Archeptolemos
- 28823 Archibald
- 29642 Archiekong
- 5806 Archieroy
- 5873 Archilochos
- 3600 Archimedes
- 11941 Archinal
- 6535 Archipenko
- 16986 Archivestef
- 14995 Archytas
- 6556 Arcimboldo
- 30553 Arcoverde
- 1031 Arctica
- 8769 Arctictern
- 8540 Ardeberg
- 9454 Ardeishar
- 4849 Ardenne
- 23204 Arditkroni
- 10501 Ardmacha
- 10130 Ardre
- 394 Arduina
- 4337 Arecibo
- 1502 Arenda
- 737 Arequipa
- 332326 Aresi
- 12052 Aretaon
- 197 Arete
- 249516 Aretha
- 95 Arethusa
- 4759 Åretta
- 1551 Argelander
- 469 Argentina
- 56067 Argerich
- 152227 Argoli
- 13410 Arhale
- 43 Ariadne
- 32603 Ariaeppinger
- 332884 Arianagrande
- 33587 Arianakim
- 1225 Ariane
- 28460 Ariannepapa
- 1395 Aribeda
- 5770 Aricam
- 28149 Arieldaniel
- 34307 Arielhaas
- 3496 Arieso
- 20855 Arifawan
- 17148 Arifirester
- 28990 Ariheinze
- 9651 Arii-SooHoo
- 23894 Arikahiguchi
- 9226 Arimahiroshi
- 3523 Arina
- 2135 Aristaeus
- 3999 Aristarchus
- 2319 Aristides
- 2934 Aristophanes
- 6123 Aristoteles
- 333631 Arivogel
- 793 Arizona
- 482101 Arizonacu
- 10702 Arizorcas
- 32033 Arjunkapoor
- 28447 Arjunmathur
- 33740 Arjunmoorthy
- 33282 Arjunramani
- 33412 Arjunsubra
- 20300 Arjunsuri
- 592170 Arkadyinin
- 23212 Arkajitdey
- 20961 Arkesilaos
- 296577 Arkhangelsk
- 4424 Arkhipova
- 15112 Arlenewolfe
- 164586 Arlette
- 70711 Arlinbartels
- 35978 Arlington
- 1717 Arlon
- 17893 Arlot
- 13830 ARLT
- 10502 Armaghobs
- 3376 Armandhammer
- 14572 Armando
- 10996 Armandspitz
- 129555 Armazones
- 6855 Armellini
- 780 Armenia
- 514 Armida
- 1464 Armisticia
- 774 Armor
- 6469 Armstrong
- 28321 Arnabdey
- 281272 Arnaudleroy
- 31453 Arnaudthiry
- 16714 Arndt
- 959 Arne
- 31916 Arnehensel
- 3457 Arnenordheim
- 13209 Arnhem
- 1100 Arnica
- 8055 Arnim
- 30164 Arnobdas
- 1018 Arnolda
- 32282 Arnoldmong
- 12211 Arnoschmidt
- 10745 Arnstadt
- 30008 Aroncoraor
- 666312 Aroneisenberg
- 1304 Arosa
- 257005 Arpadpal
- 2958 Arpetito
- 4696 Arpigny
- 2194 Arpola
- 5697 Arrhenius
- 5263 Arrius
- 31531 ARRL
- 486958 Arrokoth
- 23325 Arroyo
- 12588 Arseneau
- 33179 Arsènewenger
- 29995 Arshavsky
- 404 Arsinoë
- 7212 Artaxerxes
- 113951 Artdavidsen
- 44455 Artdula
- 1956 Artek
- 11010 Artemieva
- 105 Artemis
- 296819 Artesian
- 2597 Arthur
- 5279 Arthuradel
- 3961 Arthurcox
- 18610 Arthurdent
- 7171 Arthurkraus
- 24347 Arthurkuan
- 229781 Arthurmcdonald
- 3769 Arthurmiller
- 11516 Arthurpage
- 19025 Arthurpetron
- 26587 Arthurstorbo
- 29978 Arthurwang
- 5506 Artiglio
- 15378 Artin
- 598895 Artjuhs
- 112660 Artlucas
- 4136 Artmane
- 374848 Arturomalignani
- 61384 Arturoromer
- 26546 Arulmani
- 2313 Aruna
- 28833 Arunachalam
- 8600 Arundinaceus
- 21582 Arunvenkataraman
- 22827 Arvernia
- 397278 Arvidson
- 29818 Aryosorayya
- 10121 Arzamas
- 8233 Asada
- 12364 Asadagouryu
- 4835 Asaeus
- 10157 Asagiri
- 8747 Asahi
- 5230 Asahina
- 25884 Asai
- 48590 Asaiayumi
- 73955 Asaka
- 29159 Asakawa
- 43751 Asam
- 6986 Asamayama
- 2023 Asaph
- 4756 Asaramas
- 4531 Asaro
- 8405 Asbolus
- 12649 Ascanios
- 214 Aschera
- 3568 ASCII
- 17972 Ascione
- 4581 Asclepius
- 28050 Asekomeh
- 56280 Asemo
- 21485 Ash
- 17053 Ashayshah
- 2157 Ashbrook
- 6564 Asher
- 8486 Asherschel
- 33829 Asherson
- 32310 Asherwillner
- 9227 Ashida
- 9887 Ashikaga
- 33117 Ashinimodi
- 20799 Ashishbakshi
- 6961 Ashitaka
- 4399 Ashizuri
- 30251 Ashkin
- 19952 Ashkinazi
- 3460 Ashkova
- 128297 Ashlevi
- 6752 Ashley
- 18672 Ashleyamini
- 129452 Ashleydawn
- 58196 Ashleyess
- 31551 Ashleyking
- 129333 Ashleylancaster
- 121718 Ashleyscroggins
- 28836 Ashmore
- 17064 Ashnashah
- 28964 Ashokverma
- 25772 Ashpatra
- 7208 Ashurbanipal
- 31973 Ashwindatta
- 67 Asia
- 320541 Asiaa
- 7679 Asiago
- 25312 Asiapossenti
- 5020 Asimov
- 11554 Asios
- 27375 Asirvatham
- 18343 Asja
- 4894 Ask
- 24162 Askaci
- 4946 Askalaphus
- 32032 Askandola
- 1216 Askania
- 962 Aslög
- 543315 Asmakhammari
- 34342 Asmikumar
- 13303 Asmitakumar
- 2174 Asmodeus
- 2848 ASP
- 368719 Asparuh
- 409 Aspasia
- 7939 Asphaug
- 958 Asplinda
- 246 Asporina
- 356975 Aspriliopacelli
- 30065 Asrinivasan
- 28987 Assafin
- 6917 Assateague
- 4191 Assesse
- 8401 Assirelli
- 15342 Assisi
- 233383 Assisneto
- 1041 Asta
- 11027 Astafʹev
- 2408 Astapovich
- 672 Astarte
- 1218 Aster
- 73883 Asteraude
- 658 Asteria
- 29401 Astérix
- 248750 Asteroidday
- 4805 Asteropaios
- 233 Asterope
- 236984 Astier
- 395124 Astonepia
- 5 Astraea
- 27789 Astrakhan
- 27564 Astreichelt
- 1128 Astrid
- 29080 Astrocourier
- 53055 Astrogapra
- 25000 Astrometria
- 100000 Astronautica
- 1154 Astronomia
- 16367 Astronomiasvecia
- 59800 Astropis
- 344000 Astropolis
- 24626 Astrowizard
- 325366 Asturias
- 1871 Astyanax
- 55419 Astynoos
- 4077 Asuka
- 33928 Aswinsekhar
- 31772 Asztalos
- 18725 Atacama
- 4721 Atahualpa
- 14441 Atakanoseki
- 152 Atala
- 36 Atalante
- 1139 Atami
- 3546 Atanasoff
- 27952 Atapuerca
- 259387 Atauta
- 111 Ate
- 2062 Aten
- 7590 Aterui
- 3307 Athabasca
- 515 Athalia
- 230 Athamantis
- 730 Athanasia
- 20210 Athanasopoulos
- 881 Athene
- 333632 Athipathi
- 17072 Athiviraham
- 161 Athor
- 227930 Athos
- 18930 Athreya
- 280244 Ati
- 28376 Atifjaved
- 163693 Atira
- 1827 Atkinson
- 1198 Atlantis
- 21404 Atluri
- 810 Atossa
- 14791 Atreus
- 20994 Atreya
- 273 Atropos
- 18403 Atsuhirotaisei
- 8414 Atsuko
- 4842 Atsushi
- 27982 Atsushimiyazaki
- 85308 Atsushimori
- 20403 Attenborough
- 8975 Atthis
- 1138 Attica
- 1489 Attila
- 161693 Attilladanko
- 357116 Attivissimo
- 260235 Attwood
- 13481 Aubele
- 383492 Aubert
- 3920 Aubignan
- 39543 Aubriet
- 19620 Auckland
- 15838 Auclair
- 9117 Aude
- 333059 Audi
- 184535 Audouze
- 4238 Audrey
- 20004 Audrey-Lucienne
- 31677 Audreyglende
- 28798 Audreymartin
- 14252 Audreymeyer
- 133007 Audreysimmons
- 75564 Audubon
- 9908 Aue
- 13184 Augeias
- 254 Augusta
- 43806 Augustepiccard
- 5171 Augustesen
- 10825 Augusthermann
- 62190 Augusthorch
- 17496 Augustinus
- 101961 Augustklipstein
- 113661 Augustodaolio
- 90821 Augustsedláček
- 170306 Augustzátka
- 6090 Aulis
- 122555 Auñón-Chancellor
- 1480 Aunus
- 1488 Aura
- 19912 Aurapenenta
- 16709 Auratian
- 700 Auravictrix
- 120101 Aureladina
- 341826 Aurelbaier
- 419 Aurelia
- 22769 Aurelianora
- 1231 Auricula
- 6043 Aurochs
- 94 Aurora
- 79766 Aurorestéphant
- 63 Ausonia
- 19861 Auster
- 333146 Austin
- 134036 Austincummings
- 33584 Austinkatzer
- 28734 Austinmccoy
- 19602 Austinminor
- 33511 Austinwang
- 8088 Australia
- 2236 Austrasia
- 136 Austria
- 2920 Automedon
- 1465 Autonoma
- 12856 Autridas
- 5461 Autumn
- 11760 Auwers
- 522466 Auyeung
- 39300 Auyeungsungfan
- 17445 Avatcha
- 32580 Avbalasingam
- 45846 Avdellidou
- 26356 Aventini
- 29728 Averbeck
- 12646 Avercamp
- 8318 Averroes
- 3580 Avery
- 31655 Averyclowes
- 2755 Avicenna
- 26503 Avicramer
- 10011 Avidzba
- 12161 Avienius
- 9385 Avignon
- 309706 Ávila
- 22627 Aviscardi
- 20500 Avner
- 12294 Avogadro
- 8588 Avosetta
- 19544 Avramkottke
- 278609 Avrudenko
- 3324 Avsyuk
- 5399 Awa
- 3380 Awaji
- 9967 Awanoyumi
- 13039 Awashima
- 19386 Axelcronstedt
- 31980 Axelfeldmann
- 15924 Axelmartin
- 12850 Axelmunthe
- 311604 Axelmurk
- 5097 Axford
- 5648 Axius
- 55565 Aya
- 4641 Ayako
- 26213 Ayani
- 372024 Ayapani
- 3994 Ayashi
- 16503 Ayato
- 434453 Ayerdhal
- 25154 Ayers
- 399411 Ayiomamitis
- 10895 Aynrand
- 24154 Ayonsen
- 25212 Ayushgupta
- 18749 Ayyubguliev
- 3290 Azabu
- 1056 Azalea
- 40198 Azarkhalatbari
- 2698 Azerbajdzhan
- 14268 Azeus
- 580301 Aznarmacías
- 35298 Azumachiharu
- 29362 Azumakofuzi
- 8723 Azumayama
- 6933 Azumayasan
- 7851 Azumino
- 8713 Azusa
- 27918 Azusagawa
- 95593 Ažusienis
- 12358 Azzurra
back to top

== See also ==
- List of minor planet discoverers
- List of observatory codes
- Meanings of minor planet names § Index
