= Aleksey Tolstoy =

Aleksey Tolstoy may refer to:

- Count Aleksey Konstantinovich Tolstoy (1817–1875), Russian poet, novelist, and playwright
- Aleksey Nikolayevich Tolstoy (1883–1945), Russian writer
- Alexey Tolstoy (crater), a crater on Mars
- 3771 Alexejtolstoj, a Flora asteroid
- MV Alexi Tolstoi, a Soviet ship
