= 2098 Zyskin =

Main-belt asteroid

Discovery
- Discovered by: L. V. Zhuravleva
- Discovery site: Crimean Astrophysical Obs.
- Discovery date: 18 August 1972

Designations
- Named after: Lev Zyskin (surgeon)
- Alternative designations: 1972 QE · 1934 NE; 1957 QH
- Minor planet category: main-belt · Vestoid

Orbital characteristics
- Epoch 4 September 2017 (JD 2458000.5)
- Uncertainty parameter 0
- Observation arc: 58.80 yr (21,476 days)
- Aphelion: 2.7306 AU
- Perihelion: 2.1167 AU
- Semi-major axis: 2.4236 AU
- Eccentricity: 0.1267
- Orbital period (sidereal): 3.77 yr (1,378 days)
- Mean anomaly: 338.14°
- Inclination: 6.4956°
- Longitude of ascending node: 337.74°
- Argument of perihelion: 354.48°

Physical characteristics
- Dimensions: 8.91 km (calculated); 10.44±2.92 km 11.35±0.20 km 12.731±0.185 km 12.774±0.047 km
- Synodic rotation period: 3.9201±0.0007 h
- Geometric albedo: 0.1084±0.0164; 0.165±0.028; 0.18±0.08; 0.20 (assumed)
- Spectral type: S
- Absolute magnitude (H): 12.30 · 12.4 · 12.5 · 12.165±0.001 (R) · 12.56±0.22 · 12.61

2098 Zyskin, provisional designation 1972 QE, is a vestoid asteroid from the inner regions of the asteroid belt, approximately 10 kilometers in diameter. It was discovered by Russian–Ukrainian astronomer Lyudmila Zhuravleva at the Crimean Astrophysical Observatory in Nauchnyj on 18 August 1972. The asteroid was named for surgeon Lev Zyskin (1930–1994).

== Orbit and classification ==
Zyskin is a member of the Vesta family. Asteroids with these spectral and orbital characteristics are thought to have all originated from the Rheasilvia crater, a large impact crater on the south-polar surface of 4 Vesta, which is the main-belt's second-most-massive asteroid after 1 Ceres. It orbits the Sun in the inner main-belt at a distance of 2.1–2.7 AU once every 3 years and 9 months (1,378 days). Its orbit has an eccentricity of 0.13 and an inclination of 6° with respect to the ecliptic.

First identified as 1934 NE at Johannesburg Observatory, the body's first used observation was taken at Goethe Link Observatory in 1957, when it was identified as 1957 QH, extending the asteroid's observation arc by 15 years prior to its official discovery observation.

== Physical characteristics ==
In October 2010, a rotational lightcurve of Zyskin was obtained from photometric observations made at the Palomar Transient Factory in California. Lightcurve analysis gave a rotation period of 3.920 hours with a brightness variation of 0.08 magnitude (U=2).

=== Diameter and albedo ===
According to the survey carried out by NASA's Wide-field Infrared Survey Explorer with its subsequent NEOWISE mission, Zyskin measures between 10.44 and 12.8 kilometers in diameter, and its surface has an albedo between 0.10 and 0.18. The Collaborative Asteroid Lightcurve Link assumes a standard albedo for S-type asteroids of 0.20 and calculates a diameter of 8.9 kilometers with an absolute magnitude of 12.61.

== Naming ==
This minor planet was named in honor of Lev Yur'evich Zyskin, professor at the Crimean Medical Institute, who was head of its Pulmonary Surgery Center. Lyudmila Zhuravleva also discovered 1858 Lobachevskij on the same day she discovered 2098 Zyskin. She is a prolific astronomer with more than 200 minor planets discovered between 1972 and 1992 and (still) ranks in 61st position on the Minor Planet Center's discoverer-list as of 2015. The official naming citation was published by the Minor Planet Center on 1 April 1980 (M.P.C. 5283).
