= 954 Li =

Main-belt asteroid

Discovery
- Discovered by: K. Reinmuth
- Discovery site: Heidelberg
- Discovery date: 4 August 1921

Designations
- Alternative designations: 1905 UN · 1920 GC · 1921 PC · 1943 PE · 1952 BE_{2}

Orbital characteristics
- Epoch 31 July 2016 (JD 2457600.5)
- Uncertainty parameter 0
- Observation arc: 109.65 yr (40051 days)
- Aphelion: 3.6711 AU (549.19 Gm)
- Perihelion: 2.5915 AU (387.68 Gm)
- Semi-major axis: 3.1313 AU (468.44 Gm)
- Eccentricity: 0.17239
- Orbital period (sidereal): 5.54 yr (2023.9 d)
- Mean anomaly: 34.454°
- Mean motion: 0° 10^{m} 40.332^{s} / day
- Inclination: 1.1694°
- Longitude of ascending node: 163.235°
- Argument of perihelion: 151.503°

Physical characteristics
- Mean radius: 26.03±0.41 km (Note: Reported as a diameter of 52.06±0.81 km.)
- Synodic rotation period: 7.207±0.002 h
- Geometric albedo: 0.06 (geometric)
- Spectral type: FCX
- Absolute magnitude (H): 10.16 (JPL)

954 Li is a main belt asteroid and member of the Themis family. It was discovered by Karl Wilhelm Reinmuth on 4 August 1921 and was named after his wife Lina Alstede Reinmuth, who also had 955 Alstede named after her. Classified as an FCX-type asteroid under the Tholen classification scheme, Li's spectrum may indicate aqueous alteration. The asteroid is estimated to be around 52 kilometres (32 mi) in size, and observations of its lightcurve—variations in its observed brightness—indicate that it rotates once every 7.2 hours.
