= 10656 Albrecht =

Main-belt asteroid

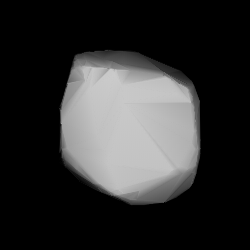
- Shape model of Albrecht from its lightcurve

Discovery
- Discovered by: C. J. van Houten; I. van Houten-G. T. Gehrels
- Discovery site: Palomar Obs.
- Discovery date: 25 March 1971

Designations
- Named after: Carl Albrecht (astronomer)
- Alternative designations: 2213 T-1 · 1990 SZ_{25} 3011 T-2
- Minor planet category: main-belt · (outer) background

Orbital characteristics
- Epoch 4 September 2017 (JD 2458000.5)
- Uncertainty parameter 0
- Observation arc: 64.30 yr (23,486 days)
- Aphelion: 3.4431 AU
- Perihelion: 2.9060 AU
- Semi-major axis: 3.1746 AU
- Eccentricity: 0.0846
- Orbital period (sidereal): 5.66 yr (2,066 days)
- Mean anomaly: 312.02°
- Mean motion: 0° 10^{m} 27.48^{s} / day
- Inclination: 8.5240°
- Longitude of ascending node: 5.2018°
- Argument of perihelion: 317.26°

Physical characteristics
- Mean diameter: 7.057±0.365 km 12.83 km (calculated)
- Synodic rotation period: 14.4899±0.0684 h
- Geometric albedo: 0.057 (assumed); 0.323±0.057
- Spectral type: C
- Absolute magnitude (H): 12.8 · 12.6 · 12.737±0.004 (R) · 13.19

10656 Albrecht (prov. designation: 2213 T-1) is a carbonaceous background asteroid from the outer region of the asteroid belt, approximately 10 kilometers (6.2 miles) in diameter. It was named after German astronomer Carl Theodor Albrecht.

== Discovery ==
Albrecht was discovered on 25 March 1971, by Dutch astronomer couple Ingrid and Cornelis van Houten, on photographic plates taken by Dutch–American astronomer Tom Gehrels at the U.S. Palomar Observatory, California. The first precovery was taken at Palomar Observatory in 1953, extending the asteroid's observation arc by 18 years prior to its discovery.

The special designation T-1 stands for the first Palomar–Leiden Trojan survey, named after the fruitful collaboration of the Palomar and Leiden Observatory in the 1960s and 1970s. Gehrels used Palomar's Samuel Oschin telescope (also known as the 48-inch Schmidt Telescope), and shipped the photographic plates to Cornelis and Ingrid van Houten-Groeneveld at Leiden Observatory where astrometry was carried out. The trio of astronomers are credited with the discovery of 4,620 minor planets.

== Classification and orbit ==
The dark C-type asteroid orbits the Sun in the outer main-belt at a distance of 2.9–3.4 AU once every 5 years and 8 months (2,066 days). Its orbit has an eccentricity of 0.08 and an inclination of 9° with respect to the ecliptic.of 2.9–3.4 AU once every 5 years and 8 months (2,070 days). Its orbit is tilted by 9° to the plane of the ecliptic and shows an eccentricity of 0.09.

== Naming ==
This minor planet was named in honor of German astronomer Carl Theodor Albrecht (1843–1915), who was instrumental in establishing the International Latitude Service (ILS) in 1899. The ILS was located at the Prussian Geodetic Institute in Berlin. Albrecht was also the first director of the ILS. The approved naming citation was published by the Minor Planet Center on 20 November 2002 (M.P.C. 47167).

== Physical characteristics ==
=== Rotation period ===
A rotational lightcurve of this asteroid was obtained from photometric observations made at the U.S. Palomar Transient Factory in October 2013. The lightcurve gave a rotation period of 14.4899±0.0684 hours with a brightness amplitude of 0.35 in magnitude (U=2).

=== Diameter and albedo ===
According to the survey carried out by the NEOWISE mission of NASA's space-based Wide-field Infrared Survey Explorer, the asteroid measures 7.1 kilometers in diameter and its surface has a high albedo of 0.32, while the Collaborative Asteroid Lightcurve Link assumes a standard albedo for carbonaceous asteroids of 0.057 and calculates a larger diameter of 12.8 kilometers with an absolute magnitude of 13.19.
