= 2015 Kachuevskaya =

Main-belt asteroid

Discovery
- Discovered by: L. Zhuravleva
- Discovery site: Nauchnyj
- Discovery date: September 4, 1972

Designations
- Named after: Natasha Kachuevskaya
- Alternative designations: 1972 RA3

Orbital characteristics
- Epoch May 14, 2008
- Aphelion: 2.5785034
- Perihelion: 2.0915664
- Eccentricity: 0.1042676
- Orbital period (sidereal): 1303.2822984
- Mean anomaly: 73.28201
- Inclination: 11.91562
- Longitude of ascending node: 344.64703
- Argument of perihelion: 273.66510

Physical characteristics
- Absolute magnitude (H): 12.4

2015 Kachuevskaya (provisional designation 1972 RA3) is a main-belt asteroid discovered on September 4, 1972 by L. Zhuravleva at Nauchnyj.

It was later named in honor of the Russian military doctor Natalia Kachuevskaya who died in the Battle of Stalingrad.

== Physical & orbital characteristics ==
The absolute magnitude of Kachuevskaya is 12.1 and its rotation period is 42.53 hours.

Kachuevskaya is located at an average distance of 2.336 AU from the Sun, with a minimum distance of 2.093 AU and a maximum of 2.578 AU. It has an orbital inclination of 11.91 degrees and an eccentricity of 0.1039. It takes 1304 days to complete one orbit around the Sun.
