= 10711 Pskov =

Main-belt asteroid

Discovery
- Discovered by: L. V. Zhuravleva
- Discovery site: Crimean Astrophysical Obs.
- Discovery date: 15 October 1982

Designations
- Named after: Pskov (Russian city)
- Alternative designations: 1982 TT_{2} · 1991 TT_{4}
- Minor planet category: main-belt · (middle) background

Orbital characteristics
- Epoch 4 September 2017 (JD 2458000.5)
- Uncertainty parameter 0
- Observation arc: 61.57 yr (22,487 days)
- Aphelion: 3.3463 AU
- Perihelion: 2.1340 AU
- Semi-major axis: 2.7401 AU
- Eccentricity: 0.2212
- Orbital period (sidereal): 4.54 yr (1,657 days)
- Mean anomaly: 287.32°
- Mean motion: 0° 13^{m} 2.28^{s} / day
- Inclination: 12.344°
- Longitude of ascending node: 12.045°
- Argument of perihelion: 330.93°

Physical characteristics
- Dimensions: 13.010±3.391 km
- Geometric albedo: 0.076±0.062
- Absolute magnitude (H): 13.0

10711 Pskov, provisional designation 1982 TT_{2}, is a dark asteroid from the middle region of the asteroid belt, approximately 13 kilometers in diameter. It was discovered on 15 October 1982, by Soviet astronomer Lyudmila Zhuravleva at the Crimean Astrophysical Observatory in Nauchnij, on the Crimean peninsula, and later named for the Russian city of Pskov.

== Orbit and classification ==
Pskov orbits the Sun in the central main-belt at a distance of 2.1–3.3 AU once every 4 years and 6 months (1,657 days). Its orbit has an eccentricity of 0.22 and an inclination of 12° with respect to the ecliptic. The body's observation arc begins 27 years prior to its official discovery observation, with a precovery taken at Palomar Observatory in November 1955.

== Physical characteristics ==
According to the survey carried out by NASA's Wide-field Infrared Survey Explorer with its subsequent NEOWISE mission, Pskov measures 13.01 kilometers in diameter, and its surface has an albedo of 0.076, which is rather typical for a carbonaceous C-type asteroid of the main-belt.

=== Lightcurves ===
As of 2017, Pskov's rotation period, composition and shape remain unknown.

== Naming ==
This minor planet was named in honor of the old Russian city of Pskov, located near the border to Estonia, where Velikaya River enters Lake Peipus (Pskov lake). The city was first mentioned in the 10th century, and is now an administrative, industrial and cultural center. The official naming citation was published by the Minor Planet Center on 24 July 2002 (M.P.C. 46102).
