= Lyudmila Zhuravleva =

Soviet-Ukrainian astronomer (born 1946)

Minor planets discovered: 213
credited by the MPC, as per August 2016

Lyudmila Vasilyevna Zhuravleva (Russian: Людмила Васильевна Журавлёва, Ukrainian: Людмила Василівна Журавльова, romanized: Liudmyla Vasylivna Zhuravlova; born 22 May 1946) is a Soviet, Russian, and Ukrainian astronomer, who worked at the Crimean Astrophysical Observatory in Nauchnyi, where she discovered 213 minor planets. She also serves as president of the Crimean branch of the "Prince Clarissimus Aleksandr Danilovich Menshikov Foundation" (which was founded in May 1995 in Berezovo, and is not the same as the "Menshikov Foundation" children's charity founded by Anthea Eno, the wife of Brian Eno). She has discovered a number of asteroids, including the Trojan asteroid 4086 Podalirius and asteroid 2374 Vladvysotskij. Zhuravleva is ranked 43rd in the Minor Planet Center's list of those who have discovered minor planets. She is credited with having discovered 200 and co-discovered an additional 13 between 1972 and 1992. In the rating of minor planet discoveries, she is listed in 57th place out of 1,429 astronomers. The main-belt asteroid 26087 Zhuravleva, discovered by her colleague Lyudmila Karachkina at Nauchnyi, was named in her honour.

== List of discovered minor planets ==
1858 Lobachevskij	18 August 1972	list
1859 Kovalevskaya	4 September 1972	list
1909 Alekhin	4 September 1972	list
1910 Mikhailov	8 October 1972	list
1959 Karbyshev	14 July 1972	list
2015 Kachuevskaya	4 September 1972	list
2098 Zyskin	18 August 1972	list
2130 Evdokiya	22 August 1974	list
2173 Maresjev	22 August 1974	list
2188 Orlenok	28 October 1976	list
2233 Kuznetsov	3 December 1972	list
2283 Bunke	26 September 1974	list

2310 Olshaniya	26 September 1974	list
2374 Vladvysotskij	22 August 1974	list
2423 Ibarruri	14 July 1972	list
2475 Semenov	8 October 1972	list
2562 Chaliapin	27 March 1973	list
2576 Yesenin	17 August 1974	list
2702 Batrakov	26 September 1978	list
2720 Pyotr Pervyj	6 September 1972	list
2740 Tsoj	26 September 1974	list
2760 Kacha	8 October 1980	list
2768 Gorky	6 September 1972	list
2771 Polzunov	26 September 1978	list

2850 Mozhaiskij	2 October 1978	list
2890 Vilyujsk	26 September 1978	list
2979 Murmansk	2 October 1978	list
3039 Yangel	26 September 1978	list
3067 Akhmatova	14 October 1982	list^{[A]}
3074 Popov	24 December 1979	list
3095 Omarkhayyam	8 September 1980	list
3108 Lyubov	18 August 1972	list
3157 Novikov	25 September 1973	list
3190 Aposhanskij	26 September 1978	list
3214 Makarenko	2 October 1978	list
3231 Mila	4 September 1972	list

3260 Vizbor	20 September 1974	list
3376 Armandhammer	21 October 1982	list
3410 Vereshchagin	26 September 1978	list
3442 Yashin	2 October 1978	list
3511 Tsvetaeva	14 October 1982	list^{[A]}
3547 Serov	2 October 1978	list
3558 Shishkin	26 September 1978	list
3566 Levitan	24 December 1979	list
3586 Vasnetsov	26 September 1978	list
3587 Descartes	8 September 1981	list
3600 Archimedes	26 September 1978	list
3616 Glazunov	3 May 1984	list

3622 Ilinsky	29 September 1981	list
3624 Mironov	14 October 1982	list^{[A]}
3655 Eupraksia	26 September 1978	list
3657 Ermolova	26 September 1978	list
3662 Dezhnev	8 September 1980	list
3724 Annenskij	23 December 1979	list
3771 Alexejtolstoj	20 September 1974	list
3803 Tuchkova	2 October 1981	list
3863 Gilyarovskij	26 September 1978	list
3889 Menshikov	6 September 1972	list
3925 Tretʹyakov	19 September 1977	list
3930 Vasilev	25 October 1982	list

3940 Larion	27 March 1973	list
3964 Danilevskij	12 September 1974	list
3969 Rossi	9 October 1978	list
3971 Voronikhin	23 December 1979	list
4005 Dyagilev	8 October 1972	list
4032 Chaplygin	22 October 1985	list
4053 Cherkasov	2 October 1981	list
4070 Rozov	8 September 1980	list
4086 Podalirius	9 November 1985	list
4118 Sveta	15 October 1982	list
4144 Vladvasilʹev	28 September 1981	list
4145 Maximova	29 September 1981	list

4166 Pontryagin	26 September 1978	list
4167 Riemann	2 October 1978	list
4214 Veralynn	22 October 1987	list
4303 Savitskij	25 September 1973	list
4311 Zguridi	26 September 1978	list
4363 Sergej	2 October 1978	list
4366 Venikagan	24 December 1979	list
4430 Govorukhin	26 September 1978	list
4434 Nikulin	8 September 1981	list
4524 Barklajdetolli	8 September 1981	list
4729 Mikhailmilʹ	8 September 1980	list
4740 Veniamina	22 October 1985	list

4778 Fuss	9 October 1978	list
4787 Shulʹzhenko	6 September 1986	list
4811 Semashko	25 September 1973	list
4870 Shcherbanʹ	25 October 1989	list
4936 Butakov	22 October 1985	list
4992 Kalman	25 October 1982	list
5096 Luzin	5 September 1983	list
5101 Akhmerov	22 October 1985	list
5301 Novobranets	20 September 1974	list
5304 Bazhenov	2 October 1978	list
5412 Rou	25 September 1973	list
5419 Benua	29 September 1981	list

5421 Ulanova	14 October 1982	list^{[A]}
5495 Rumyantsev	6 September 1972	list
5544 Kazakov	2 October 1978	list
5545 Makarov	1 November 1978	list
5572 Bliskunov	26 September 1978	list
5681 Bakulev	15 September 1990	list
5781 Barkhatova	24 September 1990	list^{[B]}
5809 Kulibin	4 September 1987	list
5994 Yakubovich	29 September 1981	list
6082 Timiryazev	21 October 1982	list
6162 Prokhorov	25 September 1973	list
6220 Stepanmakarov	26 September 1978	list

6631 Pyatnitskij	4 September 1983	list
6681 Prokopovich	6 September 1972	list
6682 Makarij	25 September 1973	list
6719 Gallaj	16 October 1990	list^{[B]}
6754 Burdenko	28 October 1976	list
6954 Potemkin	4 September 1987	list
6955 Ekaterina	25 September 1987	list
7161 Golitsyn	25 October 1982	list
7223 Dolgorukij	14 October 1982	list^{[A]}
7224 Vesnina	15 October 1982	list
7268 Chigorin	3 October 1972	list
7278 Shtokolov	22 October 1985	list

7320 Potter	2 October 1978	list
7381 Mamontov	8 September 1981	list
7382 Bozhenkova	8 September 1981	list
7413 Galibina	24 September 1990	list^{[B]}
7555 Venvolkov	28 September 1981	list
7736 Nizhnij Novgorod	8 September 1981	list
7858 Bolotov	26 September 1978	list
7913 Parfenov	9 October 1978	list
7950 Berezov	28 September 1992	list
7979 Pozharskij	26 September 1978	list
8088 Australia	23 September 1990	list^{[B]}
8134 Minin	26 September 1978	list

8145 Valujki	5 September 1983	list
8151 Andranada	12 August 1986	list
8181 Rossini	28 September 1992	list
8332 Ivantsvetaev	14 October 1982	list^{[A]}
8471 Obrant	5 September 1983	list
8477 Andrejkiselev	6 September 1986	list
8498 Ufa	15 September 1990	list
8612 Burov	26 September 1978	list
8982 Oreshek	25 September 1973	list
9014 Svyatorichter	22 October 1985	list
9017 Babadzhanyan	2 October 1986	list
9034 Oleyuria	26 August 1990	list

9156 Malanin	15 October 1982	list
9514 Deineka	27 September 1973	list
9533 Aleksejleonov	28 September 1981	list
9567 Surgut	22 October 1987	list
9612 Belgorod	4 September 1992	list
9741 Solokhin	22 October 1987	list
9838 Falz-Fein	4 September 1987	list
9848 Yugra	26 August 1990	list
9914 Obukhova	28 October 1976	list
10014 Shaim	26 September 1978	list
10016 Yugan	26 September 1978	list
10261 Nikdollezhalʹ	22 August 1974	list

10266 Vladishukhov	26 September 1978	list
10313 Vanessa-Mae	26 August 1990	list
10504 Doga	22 October 1987	list
10675 Kharlamov	1 November 1978	list
10684 Babkina	8 September 1980	list
10711 Pskov	15 October 1982	list
10728 Vladimirfock	4 September 1987	list
10729 Tsvetkova	4 September 1987	list
11268 Spassky	22 October 1985	list
11445 Fedotov	26 September 1978	list
11446 Betankur	9 October 1978	list
11791 Sofiyavarzar	26 September 1978	list

11792 Sidorovsky	26 September 1978	list
11793 Chujkovia	2 October 1978	list
11826 Yurijgromov	25 October 1982	list
12191 Vorontsova	9 October 1978	list
12199 Sohlman	8 October 1980	list
12704 Tupolev	24 September 1990	list^{[B]}
12978 Ivashov	26 September 1978	list
12979 Evgalvasilʹev	26 September 1978	list
13010 Germantitov	29 August 1986	list
13046 Aliev	31 August 1990	list
13049 Butov	15 September 1990	list
13923 Peterhof	22 October 1985	list

14318 Buzinov	26 September 1978	list
14349 Nikitamikhalkov	22 October 1985	list
14819 Nikolaylaverov	25 October 1982	list
15203 Grishanin	26 September 1978	list
15220 Sumerkin	28 September 1981	list
15231 Ehdita	4 September 1987	list
15258 Alfilipenko	15 September 1990	list
16419 Kovalev	24 September 1987	list
18295 Borispetrov	2 October 1978	list
18321 Bobrov	25 October 1982	list
20965 Kutafin	26 September 1978	list
22253 Sivers	26 September 1978	list

22276 Belkin	21 October 1982	list
23411 Bayanova	26 September 1978	list
23436 Alekfursenko	21 October 1982	list
24602 Mozzhorin	3 October 1972	list
24611 Svetochka	26 September 1978	list
24637 Olʹgusha	8 September 1981	list
24697 Rastrelli	24 September 1990	list^{[B]}
26795 Basilashvili	26 September 1978	list
27659 Dolsky	26 September 1978	list
27660 Waterwayuni	2 October 1978	list
30724 Peterburgtrista	26 September 1978	list
30725 Klimov	26 September 1978	list

30821 Chernetenko	15 September 1990	list
32766 Voskresenskoe	21 October 1982	list
32768 Alexandripatov	5 September 1983	list
32807 Quarenghi	24 September 1990	list^{[B]}
35053 Rojyurij	25 October 1982	list
42479 Tolik	28 September 1981	list
46539 Viktortikhonov	24 October 1982	list
65637 Tsniimash	14 November 1979	list
(69262) 1986 PV_{6}	12 August 1986	list
Co-discovery made with:^{A} L. G. Karachkina^{B} G. R. Kastelʹ
