= 909 Ulla =

Outer main-belt asteroid

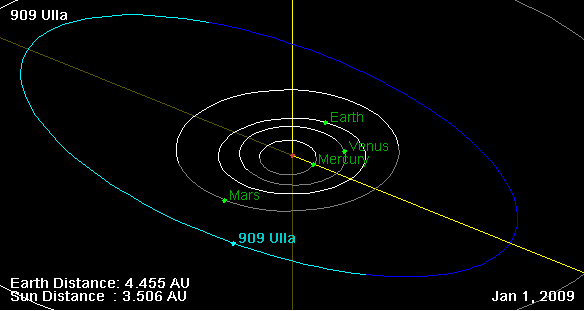
- Orbital diagram of Ulla

Discovery
- Discovered by: K. Reinmuth
- Discovery site: Heidelberg Obs.
- Discovery date: 7 February 1919

Designations
- Pronunciation: German: [ˈʊlaː] Classically: /ˈʌlə/
- Named after: Ulla Ahrens (observatory donor)
- Alternative designations: 1919 FA · 1936 SJ; 1949 OF_{1} · 1949 PW; 1966 BU · 1966 DM; A912 CA · A919 CA
- Minor planet category: main-belt · (outer); Ulla · Cybele

Orbital characteristics
- Epoch 31 May 2020 (JD 2459000.5)
- Uncertainty parameter 0
- Observation arc: 100.99 yr (36,886 d)
- Aphelion: 3.8633 AU
- Perihelion: 3.2217 AU
- Semi-major axis: 3.5425 AU
- Eccentricity: 0.0906
- Orbital period (sidereal): 6.67 yr (2,435 d)
- Mean anomaly: 180.34°
- Mean motion: 0° 8^{m} 52.08^{s} / day
- Inclination: 18.797°
- Longitude of ascending node: 146.35°
- Argument of perihelion: 232.64°
- T_{Jupiter}: 3.0250

Physical characteristics
- Mean diameter: 113.13±1.48 km; 116.44±2.4 km
- Mass: (2.2±2.2)×10^{18} kg (Note: Calculated from its standard gravitational parameter GM = 0.15±0.15 km^{3}/s^{2}.) (SB441)
- Mean density: 2.7–3.0 g/cm^{3} (calculated)
- Synodic rotation period: 8.73 h
- Geometric albedo: 0.0343±0.001; 0.037±0.001
- Spectral type: Tholen = X; B–V = 0.689; U–B = 0.279
- Absolute magnitude (H): 8.95

909 Ulla is a large and dark asteroid from the outermost regions of the asteroid belt, that measures approximately 116 kilometers (72 miles) in diameter. It is the parent body and namesake of the Ulla family, which belongs to the larger group of Cybele asteroids. It was discovered on 7 February 1919, by German astronomer Karl Reinmuth at the Heidelberg Observatory in southwest Germany. The X-type asteroid has a rotation period of 8.7 hours and a notably low value for its Jupiter Tisserand's parameter. It was named after Ulla Ahrens, daughter of a friend of the discoverer.

== Orbit and classification ==
Ulla is the parent body of the Ulla family (903), a very small asteroid family of less than 30 known bodies. It orbits the Sun in the outermost asteroid belt at a distance of 3.2–3.9 AU once every 6 years and 8 months (2,435 days; semi-major axis of 3.54 AU). Its orbit has an eccentricity of 0.09 and an inclination of 19° with respect to the ecliptic.

== Naming ==
This minor planet was named after Ulla Ahrens, a daughter of a friend of the discoverer. Karl Reinmuth also named the asteroid 950 Ahrensa for the Ahrens family, who was a donor of the Heidelberg Observatory. The official naming citation was mentioned in The Names of the Minor Planets by Paul Herget in 1955 (H 50).

== Physical characteristics ==
In the SMASS classification, Ulla is an X-type asteroid.

=== Rotation period ===
A rotational lightcurve of Ulla was obtained from photometric observations in 2000. Lightcurve analysis gave a rotation period of 8.73 hours with a brightness amplitude between 0.13 and 0.24 magnitude (U=3). Other photometric period determinations gave concurring results.

=== Diameter and albedo ===
According to the surveys carried out by the Infrared Astronomical Satellite IRAS and the Japanese Akari satellite, Ulla measures 113.13±1.48 and 116.44±2.4 kilometers in diameter and its surface has an albedo between 0.0343±0.001 and 0.037±0.001. The Collaborative Asteroid Lightcurve Link uses an albedo of 0.0450 and derives a diameter of 116.66 kilometers based on an absolute magnitude of 8.65.
