= Carl Theodor Albrecht =

German astronomer

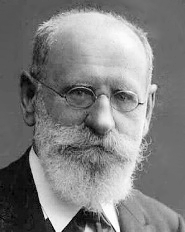
Carl Theodor Albrecht.

Carl Theodor Albrecht (August 30, 1843, Dresden, Kingdom of Saxony – August 31, 1915) was a German astronomer.

He studied mathematics and natural sciences at the TU Dresden and the Universität Berlin. During his time in Dresden, he helped founding Polyhymnia, the fraternity that later became the German Student Corps Altsachsen. He specialized in geodesy, to which he devoted much of his career. He also worked on the problem of variation of latitude, building upon the work of Seth Carlo Chandler who discovered the variation, known as the Chandler wobble. In 1882, Carl Theodor Albrecht was elected as member of the German Academy of Sciences Leopoldina.
