= 276 Adelheid =

Main-belt asteroid

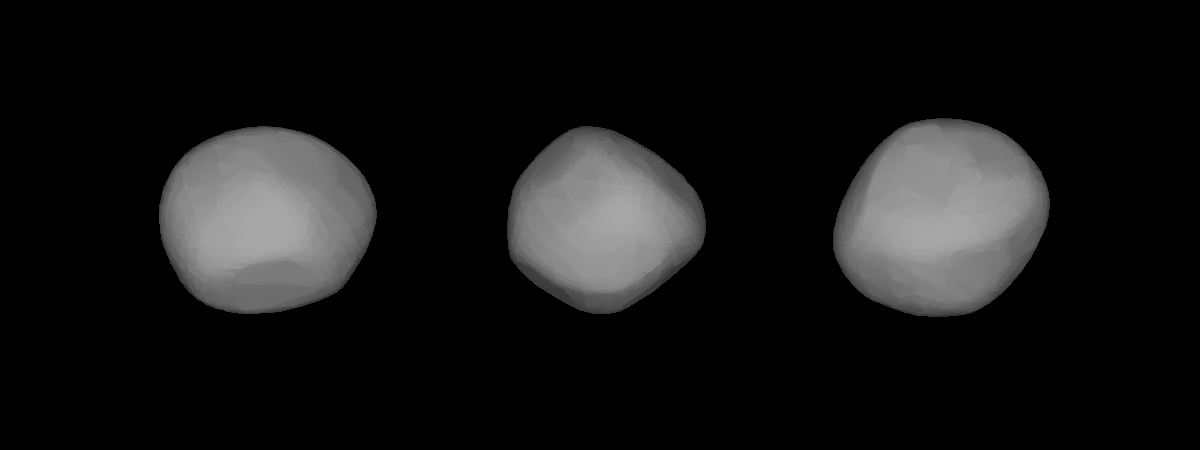
- Lightcurve-based 3D-model Adelheid

Discovery
- Discovered by: J. Palisa
- Discovery site: Vienna Obs.
- Discovery date: 17 April 1888

Designations
- Pronunciation: German: [ˈaːdəlhaɪt]
- Named after: unknown (Adelheid)
- Alternative designations: A888 HA
- Minor planet category: main-belt · (outer); Alauda

Orbital characteristics
- Epoch 4 September 2017 (JD 2458000.5)
- Uncertainty parameter 0
- Observation arc: 118.38 yr (43,239 days)
- Aphelion: 3.3296 AU
- Perihelion: 2.9065 AU
- Semi-major axis: 3.1181 AU
- Eccentricity: 0.0678
- Orbital period (sidereal): 5.51 yr (2,011 days)
- Mean anomaly: 276.54°
- Mean motion: 0° 10^{m} 44.4^{s} / day
- Inclination: 21.614°
- Longitude of ascending node: 211.16°
- Argument of perihelion: 265.21°

Physical characteristics
- Mean diameter: 104 ± 11/12 km (LCI + img); 125/117 ± 15 km (LCI + occ)
- Mass: (1.5±1.5)×10^{18} kg (Note: Calculated from its standard gravitational parameter GM = 0.1±0.1 km^{3}/s^{2}.) (SB441)
- Mean density: 1.5–2.5 g/cm^{3} (calculated)
- Synodic rotation period: 6.29 h 6.315±0.002 h 6.315±0.005 h 6.31920±0.00005 h 6.31920 h 6.319204±0.000001 h 6.32 h 6.328 h 6.328 h 12.48±0.05 h
- Pole ecliptic longitude: 9° or 199°
- Pole ecliptic latitude: −4° or −20°
- Geometric albedo: 0.03±0.01; 0.036±0.001; 0.04±0.04; 0.0434 (derived); 0.0450±0.006; 0.051±0.006; 0.0631±0.0107; 0.073±0.012
- Spectral type: Tholen = X · P B–V = 0.708; U–B = 0.271
- Absolute magnitude (H): 8.50 · 8.56 · 8.60 · 8.61

276 Adelheid is a dark Alauda asteroid from the outer region of the asteroid belt, approximately 121 kilometers in diameter. It was discovered by Austrian astronomer Johann Palisa at Vienna Observatory on 17 April 1888. The meaning of the asteroids's name is unknown.

== Classification ==
Adelheid is a member of the Alauda family (902), a large family of typically bright carbonaceous asteroids and named after its parent body, 702 Alauda.

== Physical characteristics ==
Photometric observations in 1992 gave a lightcurve with a period of 6.328 ± 0.012 hours and a brightness variation of 0.10 ± 0.02 in magnitude. The curve is regular with two maxima and minima.

In the Tholen classification, its spectrum has been characterized as that of an X-type asteroid, while polarimetric observations refined its classification to a primitive P-type.

== Naming ==
Any reference of Adelheid's name to a person or occurrence is unknown. Among the many thousands of named minor planets, Adelheid is one of 120 asteroids for which no official naming citation has been published. All of these low-numbered asteroids have numbers between 164 Eva and 1514 Ricouxa and were discovered between 1876 and the 1930s, predominantly by astronomers Auguste Charlois, Johann Palisa, Max Wolf and Karl Reinmuth.
