= 955 Alstede =

Main-belt asteroid

Discovery
- Discovered by: K. Reinmuth
- Discovery site: Heidelberg
- Discovery date: 5 August 1921

Designations
- Alternative designations: 1921 JV

Orbital characteristics
- Epoch 31 July 2016 (JD 2457600.5)
- Uncertainty parameter 0
- Observation arc: 94.46 yr (34502 days)
- Aphelion: 3.3442 AU (500.29 Gm)
- Perihelion: 1.8501 AU (276.77 Gm)
- Semi-major axis: 2.5971 AU (388.52 Gm)
- Eccentricity: 0.28765
- Orbital period (sidereal): 4.19 yr (1528.7 d)
- Mean anomaly: 294.34°
- Mean motion: 0° 14^{m} 7.764^{s} / day
- Inclination: 10.690°
- Longitude of ascending node: 351.487°
- Argument of perihelion: 282.412°

Physical characteristics
- Mean radius: 8.665±0.5 km
- Synodic rotation period: 5.19 h (0.216 d)
- Geometric albedo: 0.2135±0.028
- Absolute magnitude (H): 10.7

955 Alstede is a minor planet orbiting the Sun.

It was discovered by Karl Wilhelm Reinmuth in 1921 and was named after his wife Lina Alstede Reinmuth, who also had 954 Li named after her.
