= 15258 Alfilipenko =

Main-belt asteroid

Discovery
- Discovered by: L. V. Zhuravleva
- Discovery site: Crimean Astrophysical Obs.
- Discovery date: 15 September 1990

Designations
- Named after: Aleksandr Filipenko (Russian civil engineer)
- Alternative designations: 1990 RN_{17} · 1998 BJ_{11}
- Minor planet category: main-belt · (outer) background

Orbital characteristics
- Epoch 4 September 2017 (JD 2458000.5)
- Uncertainty parameter 0
- Observation arc: 26.63 yr (9,726 days)
- Aphelion: 3.7790 AU
- Perihelion: 2.7040 AU
- Semi-major axis: 3.2415 AU
- Eccentricity: 0.1658
- Orbital period (sidereal): 5.84 yr (2,132 days)
- Mean anomaly: 267.12°
- Mean motion: 0° 10^{m} 8.04^{s} / day
- Inclination: 6.7272°
- Longitude of ascending node: 294.01°
- Argument of perihelion: 31.763°

Physical characteristics
- Dimensions: 11.29 km (calculated); 12.059±0.379 km
- Synodic rotation period: 4.3655±0.0016 h
- Geometric albedo: 0.057 (assumed); 0.084±0.011
- Spectral type: C
- Absolute magnitude (H): 12.74±0.59 · 12.9 · 13.014±0.002 (R) · 13.1 · 13.46

15258 Alfilipenko (provisional designation 1990 RN_{17}) is a carbonaceous background asteroid from the outer region of the asteroid belt, approximately 12 kilometers in diameter. It was discovered on 15 September 1990, by Russian–Ukraininan astronomer Lyudmila Zhuravleva at the Crimean Astrophysical Observatory, Nauchnyj, on the Crimean peninsula. The asteroid was named after Russian civil engineer Aleksandr Filipenko.

== Orbit and classification ==
Alfilipenko orbits the Sun in the outer main belt at a distance of 2.7–3.8 astronomical units (AU) once every 5 years and 10 months (2,132 days). Its orbit has an eccentricity of 0.17 and an inclination of 7° with respect to the ecliptic. No precoveries were taken. The asteroid's observation arc begins with its official discovery observation.

== Physical characteristics ==
=== Lightcurves ===
A rotational lightcurve of Alfilipenko was obtained from photometric observations made at the U.S. Palomar Transient Factory in October 2013. Lightcurve analysis gave a rotation period of 4.3655 hours with a brightness variation of 0.11 magnitude (U=2).

=== Diameter and albedo ===
According to the survey carried out by the NEOWISE mission of NASA's space-based Wide-field Infrared Survey Explorer, Alfilipenko measures 12.1 kilometers in diameter and its surface has an albedo of 0.084, while the Collaborative Asteroid Lightcurve Link assumes a standard albedo for carbonaceous asteroids of 0.057 and calculates a diameter of 11.3 kilometers with an absolute magnitude of 13.46.

== Naming ==
This minor planet was named in honour of Russian civil engineer Aleksandr Vasil'evich Filipenko (born 1950) from Khanty-Mansiysk, Siberia. He is the chairman of a charitable foundation for the memory of Alexander Danilovich Menshikov (1673–1729), after whom the minor planet 3889 Menshikov is named. The official naming citation was published by the Minor Planet Center on 13 July 2004 (M.P.C. 52323).
