= 5101 Akhmerov =

Asteroid

Discovery
- Discovered by: L. V. Zhuravleva
- Discovery site: Crimean Astrophysical Obs.
- Discovery date: 22 October 1985

Designations
- Named after: Vadim Akhmerov (Ukrainian surgeon)
- Alternative designations: 1985 UB_{5} · 1969 TQ
- Minor planet category: main-belt · Eos

Orbital characteristics
- Epoch 4 September 2017 (JD 2458000.5)
- Uncertainty parameter 0
- Observation arc: 47.37 yr (17,303 days)
- Aphelion: 3.3535 AU
- Perihelion: 2.6561 AU
- Semi-major axis: 3.0048 AU
- Eccentricity: 0.1160
- Orbital period (sidereal): 5.21 yr (1,903 days)
- Mean anomaly: 60.772°
- Mean motion: 0° 11^{m} 21.12^{s} / day
- Inclination: 10.699°
- Longitude of ascending node: 205.91°
- Argument of perihelion: 174.12°

Physical characteristics
- Dimensions: 11.012±0.228 km 12.32 km (calculated)
- Synodic rotation period: 4.2705±0.0010 h
- Geometric albedo: 0.14 (assumed); 0.192±0.036
- Spectral type: CX · S
- Absolute magnitude (H): 12.2 · 12.3 · 12.36±0.41 · 12.925±0.003 (S)

5101 Akhmerov, provisional designation 1985 UB_{5}, is an Eos asteroid from the outer region of the asteroid belt, about 12 kilometers in diameter. It was discovered on 22 October 1985, by Russian astronomer Lyudmila Zhuravleva at the Crimean Astrophysical Observatory in Nauchnyj, on the Crimean peninsula. It was later named for Ukrainian surgeon Vadim Akhmerov.

== Orbit and classification ==
Akhmerov is a member of the Eos family (606), the largest asteroid family in the outer main belt consisting of nearly 10,000 asteroids.

It orbits the Sun at a distance of 2.7–3.4 AU once every 5 years and 3 months (1,903 days). Its orbit has an eccentricity of 0.12 and an inclination of 11° with respect to the ecliptic. A first precovery was obtained at the discovering observatory in 1969, extending the body's observation arc by 16 years prior to its official discovery observation.

== Physical characteristics ==
PanSTARRS photometric survey has characterized Akhmerov as a CX-type asteroid, a transitional group between the carbonaceous C-type asteroid and the metallic X-type asteroids.

=== Diameter and albedo ===
According to the survey carried out by the NEOWISE mission of NASA's space-based Wide-field Infrared Survey Explorer, Akhmerov measures 11.0 kilometers in diameter and its surface has an albedo of 0.19. The Collaborative Asteroid Lightcurve Link (CALL) assumes an albedo of 0.14 – derived from 221 Eos, the largest member and namesake of this orbital family – and calculates a diameter of 12.3 kilometers with an absolute magnitude of 12.3.

=== Rotation period ===
A rotational lightcurve of Akhmerov was obtained from photometric observations taken at the U.S. Palomar Transient Factory in September 2011. The lightcurve gave a rotation period of 4.2705±0.0010 hours with a brightness amplitude of 0.33 in magnitude (U=2).

== Naming ==
This minor planet was named after Vadim Zinov'evich Akhmerov (born 1929), long-time physician at the maternity hospital in Alushta on the Crimean peninsula. The official naming citation was published by the Minor Planet Center on 4 May 1999 (M.P.C. 34620).
