= 2572 Annschnell =

Main-belt asteroid

Discovery
- Discovered by: K. Reinmuth
- Discovery site: Heidelberg Obs.
- Discovery date: 17 February 1950

Designations
- Named after: Anneliese Schnell (astronomer)
- Alternative designations: 1950 DL · 1969 LE; 1977 SF · 1980 JN
- Minor planet category: main-belt · background

Orbital characteristics
- Epoch 4 September 2017 (JD 2458000.5)
- Uncertainty parameter 0
- Observation arc: 67.29 yr (24,577 days)
- Aphelion: 2.7419 AU
- Perihelion: 2.0403 AU
- Semi-major axis: 2.3911 AU
- Eccentricity: 0.1467
- Orbital period (sidereal): 3.70 yr (1,351 days)
- Mean anomaly: 8.0166°
- Mean motion: 0° 15^{m} 59.76^{s} / day
- Inclination: 5.1408°
- Longitude of ascending node: 200.48°
- Argument of perihelion: 51.593°

Physical characteristics
- Dimensions: 3.424±0.142 km 12.18 km (calculated)
- Synodic rotation period: 6.328±0.001 h
- Geometric albedo: 0.057 (assumed); 0.658±0.162
- Spectral type: CX · C
- Absolute magnitude (H): 13.3 · 13.4 · 13.46±0.38

2572 Annschnell, provisional designation 1950 DL, is a background asteroid from the inner regions of the asteroid belt, approximately 10 kilometers in diameter.

It was discovered on 17 February 1950, by German astronomer Karl Reinmuth at Heidelberg Observatory in southwest Germany, and named after Austrian astronomer Anneliese Schnell.

== Classification and orbit ==
Annschnell is a non-family asteroid of the main belt's background population, located near the region of the Vesta family in the inner asteroid belt. It orbits the Sun in the inner main-belt at a distance of 2.0–2.7 AU once every 3 years and 8 months (1,351 days). Its orbit has an eccentricity of 0.15 and an inclination of 5° with respect to the ecliptic. The body's observation arc begins with its official discovery observation at Heidelberg, as no precoveries were taken, and no prior identifications were made.

== Naming ==
This minor planet was named after Austrian astronomer Anneliese Schnell (1941–2015) at the Vienna Observatory. She was the first woman on the board of the Astronomische Gesellschaft, an international society for German-speaking astronomers, since its founding in 1863. As a stellar astronomer, her research included central stars of planetary nebulae, CP stars, binaries and different types of variable stars.

In the 1990s, she became a member of the Working Group for the History of Astronomy of the Astronomische Gesellschaft, where she also works on problems in the history of astronomy, in particular on the meaning of the names and on the discovery circumstances of Johann Palisa's discoveries.

Proposed by Lutz Schmadel and endorsed by Edward Bowell and Brian Marsden, the approved naming citation was prepared by Schmadel and published by the Minor Planet Center on 21 November 1991 (M.P.C. 19333).

== Physical characteristics ==
According to the survey carried out by NASA's Wide-field Infrared Survey Explorer with its subsequent NEOWISE mission, Annschnell measures 3.424 kilometers in diameter and its surface has a high albedo of 0.658, while the Collaborative Asteroid Lightcurve Link assumes a standard albedo for carbonaceous asteroids of 0.057 and consequently calculates a much larger diameter of 12.18 kilometers with an absolute magnitude of 13.3. PanSTARRS' large-scale photometric survey has classified Annschnell as a CX-subtype, an intermediary group between the carbonaceous C- and core X-type asteroids.

In May 2006, the first and only rotational lightcurve of Annschnell was obtained from photometric observations by French amateur astronomer Laurent Bernasconi. Lightcurve analysis gave a rotation period of 6.328 hours with a brightness amplitude of 0.76 magnitude (U=2+). The high amplitude indicates that the body has a non-spheroidal shape.
