= 1100 Arnica =

Main-belt asteroid

Discovery
- Discovered by: K. Reinmuth
- Discovery site: Heidelberg Obs.
- Discovery date: 22 September 1928

Designations
- Pronunciation: /ˈɑːrnɪkə/
- Named after: Arnica (flowering plant)
- Alternative designations: 1928 SD · 1950 BU; 1976 MK · 1979 HE; A904 XA · A918 RD
- Minor planet category: main-belt · (outer); Koronis

Orbital characteristics
- Epoch 4 September 2017 (JD 2458000.5)
- Uncertainty parameter 0
- Observation arc: 99.19 yr (36,230 days)
- Aphelion: 3.0985 AU
- Perihelion: 2.6991 AU
- Semi-major axis: 2.8988 AU
- Eccentricity: 0.0689
- Orbital period (sidereal): 4.94 yr (1,803 days)
- Mean anomaly: 47.143°
- Mean motion: 0° 11^{m} 58.92^{s} / day
- Inclination: 1.0342°
- Longitude of ascending node: 304.12°
- Argument of perihelion: 24.241°

Physical characteristics
- Dimensions: 16.894±0.243 km 17.234±0.122 km 17.92 km (calculated)
- Synodic rotation period: 14.535±0.005 h 14.55±0.220 h 14.58±0.05 h
- Geometric albedo: 0.2389±0.0375; 0.24 (assumed); 0.246±0.031
- Spectral type: S (assumed)
- Absolute magnitude (H): 10.390±0.110 (R) · 10.77±0.03 · 10.9 · 11.0

1100 Arnica /ˈɑːrnɪkə/, provisional designation 1928 SD, is a Koronian asteroid from the outer regions of the asteroid belt, approximately 17 kilometers in diameter. It was discovered by Karl Reinmuth at the Heidelberg Observatory in 1928 and named after the herbaceous plant Arnica (aster; daisy). The asteroid is likely of stony composition and has a rotation period of 14.535 hours.

== Discovery ==
Arnica was first observed as A904 XA at the Heidelberg-Königstuhl State Observatory in December 1904. It was officially discovered on 22 September 1928, by German astronomer Karl Reinmuth at Heidelberg in southwest Germany. On 14 October 1928, it was independently discovered by astronomers Friedrich Schwassmann and Arthur Wachmann at the Bergedorf Observatory in Hamburg. The Minor Planet Center does not recognize these independent discoverers.

== Orbit and classification ==
Arnica is a member of the Koronis family (605), an outer belt asteroid family with nearly co-planar elliptical orbits. The family consist of nearly 6,000 known members and is named after its parent body 158 Koronis.

It orbits the Sun in the outer asteroid belt at a distance of 2.7–3.1 AU once every 4 years and 11 months (1,803 days; semi-major axis of 2.90 AU). Its orbit has an eccentricity of 0.07 and an inclination of 1° with respect to the ecliptic. The body's observation arc begins at Heidelberg in October 1918, almost 10 years prior to its official discovery observation.

=== Close asteroid approaches ===
Arnica occasionally makes close approaches to other main-belt asteroids. It will pass close to 88 Thisbe three times before the year 2200. On 21 February 2043, Arnica will be 0.0487 AU (7,290,000 km) from Thisbe. On 31 March 2112, it will be 0.0432 AU (6,460,000 km) from Thisbe. Its closest approach to Thisbe will occur on 17 May 2181, when its distance to Thisbe will be 0.0277 AU (4,140,000 km). It will also approach 7 Iris and 16 Psyche, coming within 0.0117 AU (1,750,000 km) and 0.0369 AU (5,520,000 km) on 28 November 2104 and 16 July 2199, respectively.

== Physical characteristics ==
Arnica is an assumed stony S-type asteroid, which is also the overall spectral type for members of the Koronis family.

=== Rotation period ===
Several rotational lightcurves of Arnica have been obtained from photometric observations since 2003. Analysis of the best-rated lightcurve gave a rotation period of 14.535 hours with a consolidated brightness amplitude between 0.09 and 0.28 magnitude (U=3).

=== Diameter and albedo ===
According to the survey carried out by the NEOWISE mission of NASA's Wide-field Infrared Survey Explorer, Arnica measures 16.894 and 17.234 kilometers in diameter and its surface has an albedo of 0.246 and 0.2389, respectively. The Collaborative Asteroid Lightcurve Link assumes a stony standard albedo for Koronian asteroids of 0.24 and calculates a diameter of 17.92 kilometers based on an absolute magnitude of 10.9.

== Naming ==
This minor planet was named after Arnica, a genus of flowering plants in the sunflower family (aster, daisy, composite). The official naming citation was mentioned in The Names of the Minor Planets by Paul Herget in 1955 (H 103).

=== Reinmuth's flowers ===
Due to his many discoveries, Karl Reinmuth submitted a large list of 66 newly named asteroids in the early 1930s. The list covered his discoveries with numbers between (1009) and (1200). This list also contained a sequence of 28 asteroids, starting with 1054 Forsytia, that were all named after plants, in particular flowering plants (also see list of minor planets named after animals and plants).
