= 973 Aralia =

Asteroid of the Ursula family

Discovery
- Discovered by: K. Reinmuth
- Discovery site: Heidelberg Obs.
- Discovery date: 18 March 1922

Designations
- Pronunciation: /əˈreɪliə/
- Named after: Aralia (genus of plants)
- Alternative designations: A922 FB · 1954 SE; 1922 LR
- Minor planet category: main-belt · (outer); Ursula

Orbital characteristics
- Epoch 31 May 2020 (JD 2459000.5)
- Uncertainty parameter 0
- Observation arc: 97.80 yr (35,720 d)
- Aphelion: 3.5717 AU
- Perihelion: 2.8522 AU
- Semi-major axis: 3.2119 AU
- Eccentricity: 0.1120
- Orbital period (sidereal): 5.76 yr (2,103 d)
- Mean anomaly: 63.633°
- Mean motion: 0° 10^{m} 16.32^{s} / day
- Inclination: 15.828°
- Longitude of ascending node: 348.44°
- Argument of perihelion: 87.856°

Physical characteristics
- Mean diameter: 51.60±1.6 km; 51.609±0.389 km; 55.50±0.77 km
- Synodic rotation period: 7.3662±0.0003 h
- Geometric albedo: 0.084±0.003; 0.0959±0.006; 0.098±0.018
- Spectral type: SMASS = Xk; X (S3OS2)
- Absolute magnitude (H): 10.1

973 Aralia (prov. designation: A922 FB or 1922 LR) is an asteroid of the Ursula family located in the outer regions of the asteroid belt, approximately 52 kilometers (32 miles) in diameter. It was discovered on 18 March 1922, by German astronomer Karl Reinmuth at the Heidelberg Observatory in southern Germany. The Xk-type asteroid has a rotation period of 7.3 hours. It was named after the genus of ivy-like plant Aralia, also known as "spikenard".

== Orbit and classification ==
Aralia is a core member of the Ursula family (631), a large family of C- and X-type asteroids, named after 375 Ursula. It orbits the Sun in the outer main-belt at a distance of 2.9–3.6 AU once every 5 years and 9 months (2,103 days; semi-major axis of 3.21 AU). Its orbit has an eccentricity of 0.11 and an inclination of 16° with respect to the ecliptic. The body's observation arc begins at Vienna Observatory on 28 March 1922, or 10 days after its official discovery observation at Heidelberg.

== Naming ==
This minor planet was named after the genus of the Eurasian ivy-like plant Aralia, also known as "spikenard". A member of the Ginseng family, it has evergreen leaves, small yellowish flowers, and black berries. The naming was mentioned in The Names of the Minor Planets by Paul Herget in 1955 (H 93).

== Physical characteristics ==
In the SMASS classification, Aralia is a Xk-type, a transitional subtype of the X-type to the less common K-type asteroids. In both the Tholen- and SMASS-like taxonomy of the Small Solar System Objects Spectroscopic Survey (S3OS2), it is an X-type asteroid. The overall spectral type of the Ursula family is that of a C and X-type.

=== Rotation period ===
In May 2015, a rotational lightcurve of Aralia was obtained from photometric observations by Julian Oey, Hasen Williams and Roger Groom at the Blue Mountains Observatory (Q68) and Darling Range Observatory (DRO). Lightcurve analysis gave a rotation period of 7.3662±0.0003 hours with a brightness variation of 0.23±0.02 magnitude (U=3). Alternative observations by Robert Stephens at the Santana Observatory (646) in 2001 and Michael S. Alkema at the Elephant Head Observatory (G35) in 2012, gave a similar period determination of 7.29±0.01 and 7.291±0.003 hours, with an amplitude of 0.25±0.03 and 0.20±0.02, respectively (U=2/2+).

=== Diameter and albedo ===
According to the surveys carried out by the Infrared Astronomical Satellite IRAS, the NEOWISE mission of NASA's Wide-field Infrared Survey Explorer (WISE), and the Japanese Akari satellite, Aralia measures between 51.6 and 55.5 kilometers in diameter and its surface an albedo between 0.08 and 0.10. Additional publications by WISE in 2012 and 2015, gave a mean diameter 56.403±5.687 and 46.724±16.447, with an albedo of 0.069±0.402 and 0.073±0.041, respectively. The Collaborative Asteroid Lightcurve Link derives an albedo of 0.0614 and a diameter of 51.24 kilometers based on an absolute magnitude of 10.1.
