= 1909 Alekhin =

Slow-rotating, stony main-belt asteroid

Discovery
- Discovered by: L. Zhuravleva
- Discovery site: Crimean Astrophysical Obs.
- Discovery date: 4 September 1972

Designations
- Named after: Alexander Alekhine (chess grandmaster)
- Alternative designations: 1972 RW_{2} · 1926 GU; 1930 KF · 1930 KM; 1934 NZ · 1934 OC; 1941 FJ · 1960 FD; 1969 UU · 1971 DL
- Minor planet category: main-belt · (inner)

Orbital characteristics
- Epoch 4 September 2017 (JD 2458000.5)
- Uncertainty parameter 0
- Observation arc: 91.06 yr (33,259 days)
- Aphelion: 2.9693 AU
- Perihelion: 1.8758 AU
- Semi-major axis: 2.4226 AU
- Eccentricity: 0.2257
- Orbital period (sidereal): 3.77 yr (1,377 days)
- Mean anomaly: 53.882°
- Mean motion: 0° 15^{m} 41.04^{s} / day
- Inclination: 1.7955°
- Longitude of ascending node: 227.46°
- Argument of perihelion: 5.6412°

Physical characteristics
- Dimensions: 15.45±9.22 km 17.33 km (derived); 17.42±1.5 km (IRAS:15); 18.59±0.37 km 18.681±0.043; 18.847±0.129 km
- Synodic rotation period: 148.2252±0.6228 h 148.6±0.2 h
- Geometric albedo: 0.0446 (derived); 0.0460±0.0018; 0.060±0.004; 0.062±0.003; 0.067±0.083; 0.0700±0.014 (IRAS:15)
- Spectral type: S
- Absolute magnitude (H): 12.30 · 12.44±0.32 · 12.60 · 12.646±0.003 (R) · 12.8 · 12.9 · 12.91±0.07

1909 Alekhin, provisional designation 1972 RW_{2}, is a stony asteroid and slow rotator from the inner regions of the asteroid belt, approximately 17 kilometers in diameter. It was discovered on 4 September 1972, by Russian–Ukrainian astronomer Lyudmila Zhuravleva at the Crimean Astrophysical Observatory, Nauchnyj, on the Crimean peninsula, and named after chess grandmaster and World Chess Champion Alexander Alekhine.

== Orbit and classification ==
The S-type asteroid orbits the Sun in the inner main-belt at a distance of 1.9–3.0 AU once every 3 years and 9 months (1,377 days). Its orbit has an eccentricity of 0.23 and an inclination of 2° with respect to the ecliptic.

== Physical characteristics ==
=== Slow rotator ===
Alekhin is a slow rotator. In March 2009 and September 2010, two rotational lightcurves for Alekhin were obtained from photometric observations made by the Palomar Transient Factory and by astronomer Roger Dymock, respectively. The lightcurves gave a rotation period of 148 hours with a brightness variation of 0.42–0.45 magnitude (U=2/3).

=== Diameter and albedo ===
According to the surveys carried out by the Infrared Astronomical Satellite IRAS, the Japanese Akari satellite, and NASA's Wide-field Infrared Survey Explorer with its subsequent NEOWISE mission, Alekhin measures between 15.5 and 18.8 kilometers in diameter and its surface has an albedo of 0.046 to 0.070. The Collaborative Asteroid Lightcurve Link derives an albedo of 0.045 and a diameter of 17.3 kilometers with an absolute magnitude of 12.8.

=== Occultation ===
Alekhin is scheduled to occlude a 9.1 magnitude star in the constellation Leo on 30 November 2008, dimming the magnitude of both heavenly bodies for a maximum duration of 0.6 seconds. Astronomers had, as of March 2008, not predicted an optimal trajectory for the event.

== Naming ==
This minor planet was named in honour of Russian-born Alexander Alekhine (1892–1946), chess grandmaster, considered one of the greatest chess players ever. The official naming citation was published by the Minor Planet Center on 20 February 1976 (M.P.C. 3937).
