= 3067 Akhmatova =

Stony Flora asteroid

Discovery
- Discovered by: L. V. Zhuravleva; L. G. Karachkina
- Discovery site: Crimean Astrophysical Obs.
- Discovery date: 14 October 1982

Designations
- Named after: Anna Akhmatova (Russian poet)
- Alternative designations: 1982 TE_{2} · 1938 SS; 1962 XV · 1972 XV; 1977 EV_{1} · 1980 BE_{5}
- Minor planet category: main-belt · Flora

Orbital characteristics
- Epoch 4 September 2017 (JD 2458000.5)
- Uncertainty parameter 0
- Observation arc: 54.51 yr (19,908 days)
- Aphelion: 2.5548 AU
- Perihelion: 1.9372 AU
- Semi-major axis: 2.2460 AU
- Eccentricity: 0.1375
- Orbital period (sidereal): 3.37 yr (1,229 days)
- Mean anomaly: 93.964°
- Mean motion: 0° 17^{m} 34.08^{s} / day
- Inclination: 4.5244°
- Longitude of ascending node: 350.49°
- Argument of perihelion: 95.577°

Physical characteristics
- Dimensions: 6.253±0.160; 6.457±0.060 km 6.81 km (calculated)
- Synodic rotation period: 3.68589±0.00004 h (Note: Pravec (2009): lightcurve plot of (3067) Akhmatova with a rotation period 3.68629±0.00003 hours with a brightness amplitude of 0.30 magnitude; Pravec (2011) web: rotation period 3.68589±0.00004 hours with a brightness amplitude of 0.24 mag. Summary figures at Collaborative Asteroid Lightcurve Link (CALL)); 3.68629±0.00003 h 3.6863±0.0006 h
- Geometric albedo: 0.24 (assumed); 0.2691±0.0726; 0.285±0.060
- Spectral type: S
- Absolute magnitude (H): 13.0 · 12.947±0.003 (R)

3067 Akhmatova, provisional designation 1982 TE_{2}, is a stony Flora asteroid from the inner regions of the asteroid belt, approximately 6 kilometers in diameter.

The asteroid discovered on 14 October 1982, by Soviet–Russian astronomers Lyudmila Zhuravleva and Lyudmila Karachkina at the Crimean Astrophysical Observatory, Nauchnyj, on the Crimean peninsula. It was named after Russian poet Anna Akhmatova.

== Orbit and classification ==
Akhmatova is a S-type asteroid and a member of the Flora family, one of the largest groups of stony asteroids in the main-belt. It orbits the Sun in the inner main-belt at a distance of 1.9–2.6 AU once every 3 years and 4 months (1,229 days). Its orbit has an eccentricity of 0.14 and an inclination of 5° with respect to the ecliptic.

It was first identified as 1938 SS at Turku Observatory in 1938. The asteroid's observation arc begins with its identification as 1962 XV at Goethe Link Observatory in 1962, or 20 years prior to its official discovery observation at Nauchnyj.

== Physical characteristics ==
=== Diameter and albedo ===
According to the survey carried out by the NEOWISE mission of NASA's space-based Wide-field Infrared Survey Explorer, Akhmatova measures 6.3 and 6.5 kilometers in diameter and its surface has an albedo of 0.269 and 0.285, respectively, while the Collaborative Asteroid Lightcurve Link assumes an albedo of 0.24 – which derives from 8 Flora, the largest member and namesake of this orbital family – and calculates a diameter of 6.8 kilometers with an absolute magnitude of 13.0.

=== Rotation period ===
In December 2009, and May 2012, two rotational lightcurves of Akhmatova were obtained from photometric observations by Czech astronomer Petr Pravec. Lightcurve analysis showed a rotation period of 3.68629 and 3.68589 hours with a brightness variation of 0.30 and 0.24 in magnitude, respectively (U=3/3). Observations at the Palomar Transient Factory in August 2012, gave a period of 3.6863 hours and an amplitude of 0.40 in magnitude (U=2).

== Naming ==
This minor planet was named after Russian modernist poet, Anna Akhmatova (1889–1966), awarded an honorary doctorate by Oxford University. The official naming citation was published by the Minor Planet Center on 31 May 1988 (M.P.C. 13174).
