= 950 Ahrensa =

Phocaea asteroid and slow rotator

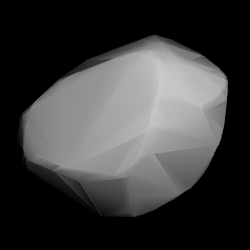
- Modelled shape of Ahrensa from its lightcurve

Discovery
- Discovered by: K. Reinmuth
- Discovery site: Heidelberg Obs.
- Discovery date: 1 April 1921

Designations
- Named after: Ahrens family (friends of discoverer)
- Alternative designations: 1921 JP · 1955 SU_{2} 1974 VG_{3} · A904 RF
- Minor planet category: main-belt · Phocaea

Orbital characteristics
- Epoch 31 July 2016 (JD 2457600.5)
- Uncertainty parameter 0
- Observation arc: 111.60 yr (40761 days)
- Aphelion: 2.7477 AU (411.05 Gm)
- Perihelion: 1.9958 AU (298.57 Gm)
- Semi-major axis: 2.3717 AU (354.80 Gm)
- Eccentricity: 0.15851
- Orbital period (sidereal): 3.65 yr (1334.1 d)
- Mean anomaly: 53.005°
- Mean motion: 0° 16^{m} 11.424^{s} / day
- Inclination: 23.477°
- Longitude of ascending node: 181.81°
- Argument of perihelion: 348.19°

Physical characteristics
- Mean diameter: 15.03±1.8 (IRAS:15) km 16.21±0.53 km 14.299±0.070 km 16.66±0.41 km 15.34 km (derived)
- Synodic rotation period: 202±1 h, 202 h (8.4 d)
- Geometric albedo: 0.1793±0.054 (IRAS:15); 0.158±0.011; 0.1988±0.0203; 0.231±0.031; 0.2727 (derived)
- Spectral type: SMASS = Sa; S
- Absolute magnitude (H): 11.2

950 Ahrensa, provisional designation 1921 JP, is a stony Phocaea asteroid and slow rotator from the inner regions of the asteroid belt, approximately 15 kilometers in diameter. It was discovered on 1 April 1921, by German astronomer Karl Reinmuth at Heidelberg Observatory in southern Germany.

== Description ==
The S-type asteroid, classified as a Sa-subtype in the SMASS taxonomic scheme, is a member of the Phocaea family, a group of asteroids with similar orbital characteristics. It orbits the Sun at a distance of 2.0–2.7 AU once every 3 years and 8 months (1,334 days). Its orbit shows an eccentricity of 0.16 and is tilted by 23 degrees to the plane of the ecliptic.

A photometric lightcurve analysis at the U.S. Palmer Divide Observatory in 2009, showed that the body has an exceptionally long rotation period of 202 hours. According to the surveys carried out by the Infrared Astronomical Satellite, IRAS, the Japanese Akari satellite, and the U.S. Wide-field Infrared Survey Explorer with its subsequent NEOWISE mission, the surface of the asteroid has an albedo in the range of 0.16 to 0.23, while the Collaborative Asteroid Lightcurve Link derives an even higher value of 0.27 for the stony body.

The minor planet was named in honor of friends of the discoverer Karl Reinmuth, the Ahrens family, who helped him financially at the Heidelberg Observatory. Reinmuth also named the minor planet 909 Ulla after Ulla Ahrens, a member of this family.
