= 23436 Alekfursenko =

Main-belt asteroid

Discovery
- Discovered by: L. V. Zhuravleva
- Discovery site: Crimean Astrophysical Obs.
- Discovery date: 21 October 1982

Designations
- Named after: Aleksandr Fursenko (Russian historian)
- Alternative designations: 1982 UF_{8} · 1982 VU_{6} 1982 VZ_{10} · 1987 QP_{2} 1999 XD_{167}
- Minor planet category: main-belt · (outer); Hygiea

Orbital characteristics
- Epoch 27 April 2019 (JD 2458600.5)
- Uncertainty parameter 0
- Observation arc: 36.55 yr (13,349 d)
- Aphelion: 3.7754 AU
- Perihelion: 2.5432 AU
- Semi-major axis: 3.1593 AU
- Eccentricity: 0.1950
- Orbital period (sidereal): 5.62 yr (2,051 d)
- Mean anomaly: 186.36°
- Mean motion: 0° 10^{m} 31.8^{s} / day
- Inclination: 3.7682°
- Longitude of ascending node: 309.70°
- Argument of perihelion: 87.307°

Physical characteristics
- Mean diameter: 8.434±0.13 km
- Synodic rotation period: 3.627672±0.000002 h 3.628±0.0004 h
- Geometric albedo: 0.082±0.016
- Spectral type: C (assumed)
- Absolute magnitude (H): 13.8; 13.7

23436 Alekfursenko (provisional designation 1982 UF_{8}) is a carbonaceous Hygiean asteroid from the outer region of the asteroid belt, approximately 8.4 kilometers (5.2 miles) in diameter. It was discovered on 21 October 1982, by Russian–Ukrainian astronomer Lyudmila Zhuravleva at the Crimean Astrophysical Observatory, Nauchnyj, on the Crimean peninsula. The likely C-type asteroid has a rotation period of 3.6 hours. It was named after Russian historian Aleksandr Fursenko.

== Orbit and classification ==
Alekfursenko is a member of the Hygiea family (601), a very large family of carbonaceous outer-belt asteroids, named after the fourth-largest asteroid, 10 Hygiea. It orbits the Sun in the outer main-belt at a distance of 2.5–3.8 AU once every 5 years and 7 months (2,051 days; semi-major axis of 3.16 AU). Its orbit has an eccentricity of 0.20 and an inclination of 4° with respect to the ecliptic. The asteroid's observation arc begins with its discovery observation in 1982, as neither precoveries nor prior identifications were obtained.

== Naming ==
This minor planet was named in honor of Russian historian Aleksandr Fursenko (1927–2008), expert in topics such as international relations, U.S. history, and Russian foreign economic policy. He was also a member of the Russian Academy of Sciences. The official naming citation was published by the Minor Planet Center on 24 November 2007 (M.P.C. 61268).

== Physical characteristics ==
=== Rotation period ===
In November 2010, a rotational lightcurve of Alekfursenko was obtained from photometric observations made by astronomers at the Palomar Transient Factory in California. Lightcurve analysis gave a rotation period of 3.6277 hours with a brightness variation of 0.42 magnitude (U=2). A modeled lightcurve using photometric data from the Lowell Photometric Database and from the Wide-field Infrared Survey Explorer (WISE) was published in 2018. It gave a concurring sidereal period of 3.627672 hours, as well as a spin axis at (−1.0°, 54.0°) in ecliptic coordinates (λ, β).

=== Diameter and albedo ===
According to the survey carried out by the NEOWISE mission of NASA's space-based WISE spacecraft, Alekfursenko measures 8.4 kilometers in diameter and its surface has an albedo of 0.08, while the Collaborative Asteroid Lightcurve Link assumes a standard albedo for carbonaceous asteroids of 0.057 and calculates a diameter of 8.0 kilometers with an absolute magnitude of 14.22.
