= 1858 Lobachevskij =

Rare-type main-belt asteroid

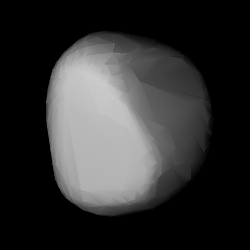
- Lobachevskij modeled from its lightcurve

Discovery
- Discovered by: L. Zhuravleva
- Discovery site: Crimean Astrophysical Obs.
- Discovery date: 18 August 1972

Designations
- Named after: Nikolai Lobachevsky (Russian mathematician)
- Alternative designations: 1972 QL · 1928 SG; 1936 MH · 1955 VW; 1957 BM · 1964 YC
- Minor planet category: main-belt · (middle)

Orbital characteristics
- Epoch 4 September 2017 (JD 2458000.5)
- Uncertainty parameter 0
- Observation arc: 80.42 yr (29,372 days)
- Aphelion: 2.9086 AU
- Perihelion: 2.4897 AU
- Semi-major axis: 2.6992 AU
- Eccentricity: 0.0776
- Orbital period (sidereal): 4.43 yr (1,620 days)
- Mean anomaly: 98.237°
- Mean motion: 0° 13^{m} 20.28^{s} / day
- Inclination: 1.6607°
- Longitude of ascending node: 271.91°
- Argument of perihelion: 17.726°

Physical characteristics
- Dimensions: 10.769±0.189; 10.919±0.116 km 13.06 km (calculated)
- Synodic rotation period: 5.409±0.0115 h (S); 5.413±0.003 h 5.4141±0.0115 h (R); 5.435±0.003 h 7.00±0.01 h (dated)
- Geometric albedo: 0.18 (assumed); 0.3737±0.0590; 0.383±0.055
- Spectral type: SMASS = L
- Absolute magnitude (H): 11.5 · 11.9 · 11.905±0.002 (R) · 12.0 · 12.368±0.002 (S)

1858 Lobachevskij (prov. designation: 1972 QL) is a rare-type background asteroid from the central region of the asteroid belt, approximately 13 kilometers in diameter. It was discovered on 18 August 1972, by Soviet astronomer Lyudmila Zhuravleva at the Crimean Astrophysical Observatory in Nauchnyj, on the Crimean peninsula. The asteroid was named after Russian mathematician Nikolai Lobachevsky.

== Orbit and classification ==
Lobachevskij had already been photographed in precovery images dating back to the 1930s, providing it with a much larger observation arc. It orbits the Sun in the central main-belt at a distance of 2.5–2.9 AU once every 4 years and 5 months (1,620 days). Its orbit has an eccentricity of 0.08 and an inclination of 2° with respect to the ecliptic. First observed as 1928 SG at Heidelberg Observatory in 1928, the asteroid's first used observations was a precovery taken at Palomar Observatory in 1954, extending its observation arc by 18 years prior to its official discovery at Nauchnyj.

== Naming ==
This minor planet was named in honor of mathematician Nikolai Lobachevsky (1792–1856), Russian mathematician and creator of the first comprehensive system of non-Euclidean geometry. The official naming citation was published by the Minor Planet Center on 1 June 1975 (M.P.C. 3826).

== Physical characteristics ==
Lobachevskij is a strongly reddish and relatively uncommon L-type asteroid in the SMASS classification. It has an absolute magnitude between 11.5 and 12.4.

=== Lightcurves ===
In May 2011, photometric observation of Lobachevskij gave a rotation period of 5.413 and 5.435 hours with a brightness amplitude of 0.30 and 0.33 magnitude, respectively (U=2+/2), superseding a previous period of 7.00 hours (U=2).

In September 2012, two rotational lightcurves were obtained in the S- and R-band at the Palomar Transient Factory in California. Lightcurve analysis gave a period of 5.409 and 5.4141 hours with an amplitude of 0.26 and 0.22 magnitude, respectively (U=2/2).

=== Occultation ===
Lobachevskij covered a 10.4 mag star—a phenomenon known as occultation—in the constellation Sagittarius in June 2007. It was predicted that the event could be seen in the northeastern United States and southeast Canada. The combined light magnitude of the bodies would drop momentarily—for a maximum of 2.2 seconds.

=== Diameter and albedo ===
According to the survey carried out by NASA's Wide-field Infrared Survey Explorer with its subsequent NEOWISE mission, Lobachevskij measures between 10.769 and 10.919 kilometers in diameter, and its surface has an albedo between 0.3737 and 0.383, respectively, while the Collaborative Asteroid Lightcurve Link assumes a lower albedo of 0.18 and calculates a diameter of 12.47 kilometers with an absolute magnitude of 12.0.
