= 3771 Alexejtolstoj =

Main-belt asteroid

Discovery
- Discovered by: L. Zhuravleva
- Discovery site: Crimean Astrophysical Obs.
- Discovery date: 20 September 1974

Designations
- Named after: Aleksey Nikolayevich Tolstoy (Soviet writer)
- Alternative designations: 1974 SB_{3} · 1954 QF; 1984 SG_{5}
- Minor planet category: main-belt · Flora

Orbital characteristics
- Epoch 4 September 2017 (JD 2458000.5)
- Uncertainty parameter 0
- Observation arc: 62.77 yr (22,925 days)
- Aphelion: 2.6010 AU
- Perihelion: 1.8491 AU
- Semi-major axis: 2.2251 AU
- Eccentricity: 0.1690
- Orbital period (sidereal): 3.32 yr (1,212 days)
- Mean anomaly: 323.78°
- Mean motion: 0° 17^{m} 49.2^{s} / day
- Inclination: 4.5495°
- Longitude of ascending node: 249.34°
- Argument of perihelion: 137.38°

Physical characteristics
- Dimensions: 3.71 km (calculated)
- Synodic rotation period: 11.0942±0.0116 h
- Geometric albedo: 0.24 (assumed)
- Spectral type: S
- Absolute magnitude (H): 13.871±0.002 (R) · 14.0 · 14.19±0.33 · 14.32

3771 Alexejtolstoj (provisional designation 1974 SB_{3}) is a stony Flora asteroid from the inner regions of the asteroid belt, approximately 3.7 kilometers in diameter. It was discovered on 20 September 1974, by Russian–Ukrainian astronomer Lyudmila Zhuravleva at the Crimean Astrophysical Observatory in Nauchnyj on the Crimean peninsula. The asteroid was named after writer Aleksey Nikolayevich Tolstoy.

== Orbit and classification ==
The S-type asteroid is a member of the Flora family, one of the largest groups of stony asteroids in the main-belt. It orbits the Sun in the inner main-belt at a distance of 1.8–2.6 AU once every 3 years and 4 months (1,212 days). Its orbit has an eccentricity of 0.17 and an inclination of 5° with respect to the ecliptic. It was first identified as 1954 QF at Heidelberg Observatory in 1954. The body's observation arc begins at Nauchnyj with its official discovery observation made in 1974.

== Physical characteristics ==
A fragmentary rotational lightcurve was obtained from photometric observation made at the Palomar Transient Factory in California in December 2011. The lightcurve gave a provisional rotation period of 11.0942±0.0116 hours with a low brightness amplitude of 0.08 in magnitude (U=1). The Collaborative Asteroid Lightcurve Link assumes an albedo of 0.24 – derived from 8 Flora, the largest member and namesake of its orbital family – and calculates a diameter of 3.7 kilometers.

== Naming ==
This minor planet was named after Soviet writer and public figure, Aleksey Nikolayevich Tolstoy (1883–1945). The official naming citation was published by the Minor Planet Center on 19 October 1994 (M.P.C. 24121).
