= Littrow =

Littrow may refer to:

- Joseph Johann von Littrow (1781-1840), Austrian astronomer
  - Littrow projection, a map projection invented by Joseph Johann Littrow, also called the Weir Azimuth diagram
  - Littrow (crater), a lunar crater named for astronomer Joseph Johann von Littrow
  - Taurus–Littrow, a valley on the Moon named after the Littrow crater and the Taurus mountain range
- Karl L. Littrow, Austrian astronomer, son of Joseph Johann Littrow
- Auguste von Littrow, German-Austrian author and women's movement leader
- Heinrich von Littrow, Austrian cartographer and writer
- Otto von Littrow (1843-1864), son of Karl and Auguste von Littrow
  - Littrow angle
  - Littrow prism, an optical device developed by Otto von Littrow used with lasers and in spectroscopy
  - Littrow expansion
- Lea von Littrow (1860-1925), Austrian painter, daughter of Heinrich von Littrow
