= Pogson =

Pogson is a surname. Notable people with the surname include:

- George Ambrose Pogson (1853–1914), British diplomat
- Harold Pogson (1870–1906), English cricketer and colonial police officer
- Isis Pogson (1852–1945), English astronomer and meteorologist
- Kathryn Pogson (born 1954), English actress
- N. R. Pogson (1829–1891), English astronomer
