= Otto von Littrow =

Austrian astronomer (1843–1864)

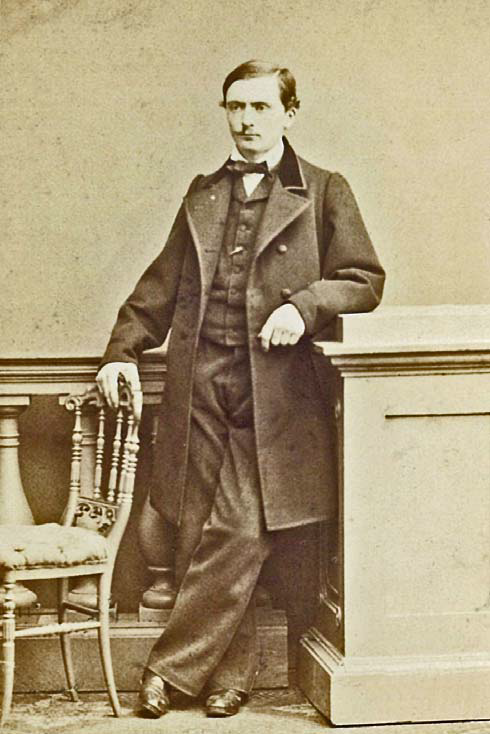
- Otto von Littrow around 1863.
- Born: 14 February 1843; Vienna, Austria
- Died: 7 November 1864 (aged 21); Vienna, Austria
- Known for: Littrow prism, Littrow angle, Littrow expansion
- Scientific career
- Fields: Astronomer, Physicist

Notes
- Note that he was the son of Karl Ludwig von Littrow and grandson of Joseph Johann von Littrow.

Otto von Littrow (14 February 1843, Vienna – 7 November 1864, Vienna) was an Austrian astronomer and physicist. He is known for his contributions in spectrometer instrumentation.

Son of astronomer Karl L. Littrow and women's movement leader Auguste von Littrow, grandson of astronomer Joseph Johann von Littrow, both his father and grandfather were directors of the Vienna Observatory. He studied with Hermann von Helmholtz and Gustav Kirchhoff at the Heidelberg University, and completes his doctorate degree in 1864. He was, as Constantin von Wurzbach puts it, "Destined for a scientific career by talent, birth and upbringing". He died from typhoid fever in Vienna in 1864.
