= 794 Irenaea =

Dark background asteroid

Discovery
- Discovered by: J. Palisa
- Discovery site: Vienna Obs.
- Discovery date: 27 August 1914

Designations
- Pronunciation: /ɪrɪˈniːə/
- Named after: Irene Hillebrand, daughter of Edmund Weiss (Austrian astronomer )
- Alternative designations: A914 QB · 1930 KH; 1936 QK · 1947 QD; 1953 TT_{2} · 1914 VB
- Minor planet category: main-belt · (outer); background

Orbital characteristics
- Epoch 31 May 2020 (JD 2459000.5)
- Uncertainty parameter 0
- Observation arc: 83.12 yr (30,360 d)
- Aphelion: 4.0559 AU
- Perihelion: 2.2004 AU
- Semi-major axis: 3.1281 AU
- Eccentricity: 0.2966
- Orbital period (sidereal): 5.53 yr (2,021 d)
- Mean anomaly: 31.160°
- Mean motion: 0° 10^{m} 41.16^{s} / day
- Inclination: 5.4193°
- Longitude of ascending node: 160.40°
- Argument of perihelion: 131.27°

Physical characteristics
- Mean diameter: 35.703±6.145 km; 35.75±3.6 km; 38.00±1.35 km
- Synodic rotation period: 9.14±0.01 h
- Geometric albedo: 0.045±0.004; 0.046±0.018; 0.0502±0.012
- Spectral type: C (assumed)
- Absolute magnitude (H): 11.10; 11.20; 11.30

794 Irenaea (prov. designation: A914 QB or 1914 VB) is a dark background asteroid from the outer regions of the asteroid belt. It was discovered on 27 August 1914, by Austrian astronomer Johann Palisa at the Vienna Observatory. The presumed C-type asteroid has a rotation period of 9.1 hours and measures approximately 36 kilometers (22 miles) in diameter. It was likely named after Irene Hillebrand, daughter of Austrian astronomer Edmund Weiss (1837–1917).

== Orbit and classification ==
Irenaea is a non-family asteroid of the main belt's background population when applying the hierarchical clustering method to its proper orbital elements. It orbits the Sun in the outer main-belt at a distance of 2.2–4.1 AU once every 5 years and 6 months (2,021 days; semi-major axis of 3.13 AU). Its orbit has an eccentricity of 0.30 and an inclination of 5° with respect to the ecliptic. The body's observation arc begins at Bergedorf Observatory in Hamburg on 9 December 1915, more than a year after its official discovery observation at Vienna Observatory on 27 August 1914.

== Naming ==
According to Alexander Schnell, this minor planet was likely named after Irene Hillebrand, née Weiss, daughter of Austrian astronomer Edmund Weiss (1837–1917), director of the Vienna Observatory, and wife to astronomer Karl Hillebrand (1861–1939). The name received an aea-suffix as "Irene" was already given to asteroid 14 Irene. Palisa also named asteroid 722 Frieda after her daughter, Frieda Hillebrand.

== Physical characteristics ==
Irenaea is an assumed, carbonaceous C-type asteroid. The asteroid's low albedo around 0.05 (see below) agrees with this assumption.

=== Rotation period ===
In May 2008, a rotational lightcurve of Irenaea was obtained from photometric observations by Italian amateur astronomer Silvano Casulli. Lightcurve analysis gave a rotation period of 9.14±0.01 hours with a brightness variation of 0.40±0.02 magnitude, indicative of an elongated shape (U=3−).

=== Diameter and albedo ===
According to the surveys carried out by the NEOWISE mission of NASA's Wide-field Infrared Survey Explorer (WISE), the Infrared Astronomical Satellite IRAS, and the Japanese Akari satellite, Irenaea measures (35.703±6.145), (35.75±3.6) and (38.00±1.35) kilometers in diameter and its surface has an albedo of (0.046±0.018), (0.0502±0.012) and (0.045±0.004), respectively. The Collaborative Asteroid Lightcurve Link assumes a standard albedo for a carbonaceous C-type asteroid of 0.057 and calculates a diameter of 30.59 kilometers based on an absolute magnitude of 11.3. Alternative mean diameter measurements published by the WISE team include (29.80±11.78 km), (32.45±7.05 km) and (37.140±11.511 km) with corresponding albedos of (0.036±0.021), (0.06±0.04) and (0.05±0.02).
