= 1830 Pogson =

Stony main-belt binary asteroid

Discovery
- Discovered by: P. Wild
- Discovery site: Zimmerwald Obs.
- Discovery date: 17 April 1968

Designations
- Named after: Norman Pogson (English astronomer)
- Alternative designations: 1968 HA · 1926 GW; 1929 EE · 1942 EC_{1} 1945 BB · 1953 RE_{1} 1955 FX · 1955 GE; 1961 AC · 1969 QM; 1971 BJ · 1972 NA_{1} 1972 OC · 1972 OD
- Minor planet category: main-belt · (inner); Flora · binary

Orbital characteristics
- Epoch 27 April 2019 (JD 2458600.5)
- Uncertainty parameter 0
- Observation arc: 92.52 yr (33,794 d)
- Aphelion: 2.3117 AU
- Perihelion: 2.0652 AU
- Semi-major axis: 2.1884 AU
- Eccentricity: 0.0563
- Orbital period (sidereal): 3.24 yr (1,182 d)
- Mean anomaly: 342.96°
- Mean motion: 0° 18^{m} 15.84^{s} / day
- Inclination: 3.9540°
- Longitude of ascending node: 147.45°
- Argument of perihelion: 334.96°
- Known satellites: 1 (D: 2.52 km, P: 24.24 h)

Physical characteristics
- Mean diameter: 7.710±0.669 km 8.284±0.116 km 8.35 km
- Synodic rotation period: 2.56999±0.00004 h
- Geometric albedo: 0.2188; 0.2361; 0.274
- Spectral type: Tholen = S SMASS = S B–V = 0.910; U–B = 0.500
- Absolute magnitude (H): 12.45; 12.61

1830 Pogson, provisional designation 1968 HA, is a stony Florian asteroid and an asynchronous binary system from the inner regions of the asteroid belt, approximately 8 kilometers (5 miles) in diameter. It was discovered on 17 April 1968, by Swiss astronomer Paul Wild at the Zimmerwald Observatory near Bern, Switzerland. The S-type asteroid has a rotation period 2.6 of hours. It was named for English astronomer Norman Pogson. The discovery of its 2.5-kilometer sized companion was announced in May 2007.

== Orbit and classification ==
According to a HCM-analysis by David Nesvorný, Pogson is a member of the Flora family (402), a giant asteroid clan and the largest family of stony asteroids in the asteroid belt. It has also been grouped into the Augusta family (list) by Zappalà, while for Milani and Knežević, who don't recognize the Florian clan as a family, Pogson is a non-family asteroid from the main belt's background population.

It orbits the Sun in the inner asteroid belt at a distance of 2.1–2.3 AU once every 3 years and 3 months (1,182 days; semi-major axis of 2.19 AU). Its orbit has an eccentricity of 0.06 and an inclination of 4° with respect to the ecliptic. The asteroid was first observed as 1926 GW at Simeiz Observatory in April 1926. The body's observation arc begins with its observation as 1929 EE at Heidelberg Observatory in March 1929, or 39 years prior to its official discovery observation at Zimmerwald.

== Naming ==
This minor planet was named after English astronomer Norman Pogson (1829–1891), inventor of the modern astronomical magnitude scale. At the Radcliffe and Madras observatories, he discovered eight asteroids, including 42 Isis and 67 Asia. The official naming citation was published by the Minor Planet Center on 15 October 1977 (M.P.C. 4236). The lunar crater Pogson was also named in his honor.

== Physical characteristics ==
In the Tholen and SMASS classification, Pogson is a common, stony S-type asteroid.

=== Rotation period ===
In April 2007, a rotational lightcurve of Pogson was obtained from photometric observations by an international collaboration of Australian, European and American astronomers, namely, David Higgins , Petr Pravec, Peter Kušnirák, Julian Oey and Donald Pray. Lightcurve analysis gave a rotation period of 2.5702±0.0001 hours with a brightness variation of 0.12 magnitude (U=3). In the following month, a more refined period of 2.56990±0.00004 hours with the same amplitude was measured by Petr Pravec (U=3).

Additional period determinations were made by Melissa Dykhuis and collaborators (2.5698 h) at the Calvin College Observatory (H62) during 2008 (U=2+), and by Pierre Antonini (2.5699 h) and Julian Oey (2.604 h) in March 2013 (U=3-/2).

=== Satellite ===
During the photometric observation in 2007, it was also revealed, that Pogson is an asynchronous binary system with a minor-planet moon in its orbit. The mutual eclipse and occultation events showed that the companion orbits its primary every 24.24 hours. Based on a secondary-to-primary diameter ratio of 0.32 or larger, Johnston's archive estimates a diameter of 2.52 kilometers for the satellite, separated by 8 kilometers from its primary.

=== Diameter and albedo ===
According to the survey carried out by the NEOWISE mission of NASA's Wide-field Infrared Survey Explorer, Pogson measures between 7.7 and 8.35 kilometers in diameter and its surface has an albedo between 0.2188 and 0.274. The Collaborative Asteroid Lightcurve Link adopts the result from Petr Pravec's revised WISE-data, that is, an albedo of 0.2188 and a diameter of 8.35 kilometers based on an absolute magnitude of 12.659.
