= Lea von Littrow =

Austrian-Fiuman painter (1860–1925)

- Born: Leontine von Littrow; 17 March 1860; Trieste, Austrian Empire
- Died: May 11, 1925 (aged 65); Opatija, Croatia
- Known for: Painting

Leo von Littrow (17 March 1860 – 11 May 1925) was an Austrian-Fiuman painter known for her landscapes and marine paintings.

== Biography ==
Leo von Littrow was born as Leontine Camilla von Littrow in Trieste and was always called "Leo" from an early age. She used the name "Leontine" or "Leo" von Littrow. As a member of an old Austrian-Czech family, she had well known ancestors. Her father Heinrich von Littrow, a famous frigate captain in the Austrian Navy, cartographer, poet and playwright that worked as the head of the Trade and Nautical Academy in Trieste and as the Royal Hungarian Maritime Inspector in Fiume. Her mother, Caroline Fanny Barry, like Leo's uncle Alfred Barry and Richard Barry, came from a wealthy banking and merchant family from Genoa and Trieste. Leo's grandfather was the imperial court astronomer Johann Joseph von Littrow. Her family was elevated to hereditary nobility in 1835. One of her uncles was the astronomer Karl Ludwig von Littrow, successor to his father Joseph as head of the Vienna University Observatory and Rector of the University of Vienna. He was married to the women's rights activist Auguste von Littrow, co-founder of the Vienna Women's Employment Association, the Association of Wiener Frauenheim and a city's benefactor, who maintained a salon frequented by Franz Grillparzer, Josef Danhauser, Marie von Ebner-Eschenbach, Ottilie von Goethe, Carl von Zumbusch. During her childhood and youth stays in Vienna, the Viennese painter Hans Canon, another friend of the Littrow Circle, discovered Leo von Littrow's talent as a painter.

Leo von Littrow grew up between the family homes in Trieste and Fiume, and around 1887 started to live in Abbazia, a marine health resort of the Austro-Hungarian monarchy in the outskirts of Fiume. She had come here with her father, who came to this place for professional reasons. After the Viennese painting lessons with Hans Canon, she received her artistic training from around 1875 under the influence of French Impressionism by the equally aristocratic Parisian painter Jean d’Alheim, a student of the romantic Alexandre Calame. After various successful exhibitions in Vienna, Bremen, Munich and London, starting from around 1885 Leo von Littrow started to be considered a successful painter of the sea and the Italian and Austro-Hungarian landscape and traditional life. Her pergola and garden views became particularly popular. After a first joint trip to Ragusa with Austrian impressionist artist Olga Wisinger-Florian in 1887, a long-standing friendship developed between the two, which was important for the artistic style of both of them. In these years Leo von Littrow developed her own individualistic, light-flooded and pure color style of impressionism.

Even before the turn of the century, Littrow was considered a well-established impressionist of the South. She sold pictures to crowned heads and important collectors: Ferdinand I the Prince of Bulgaria, Archduke Charles Stephen of Austria and Crown Princess Stephanie of Austria, with whom she corresponded and was friends throughout her life and who frequented her studio in Abbazia. Leo and Heinrich von Littrow's closest friends and collectors of their pictures included the industrialist and co-inventor of the torpedo Robert Whitehead and his daughter and son-in-law Alice Countess von Hoyos and Georg von Hoyos.

Leo von Littrow died in her hometown of Abbazia in 1925.

== Art and legacy ==
The painter always signed her works with “Leo von Littrow”, “Leo Littrow” or the monogram “LL”. After very successful exhibitions in Vienna (1880), Bremen (1880) London (1886), Budapest (1884), Munich (1893) or Chicago (1893, at the Woman's Building for the Colombian World Exhibition) in Salzburg, and above all thanks to her large solo exhibitions in London (1899, 1904, 1906) and Vienna (1914) Leo von Littrow was the only woman to receive an honorable commission from the newly built museums of the Viennese court as early as the mid-1880s: the interior painting for the mezzanine residences of the Natural History Museum shows her painting Coast of Ragusa. Littrow's works are now conserved in the Vienna Museum, the Gemäldegalerie of the Academy of Fine Arts of Vienna, the City Museum of Rijeka and the Museo Revoltella in Trieste.

Her work was included in the 2019 exhibition City Of Women: Female artists in Vienna from 1900 to 1938 at the Österreichische Galerie Belvedere.

== Gallery ==
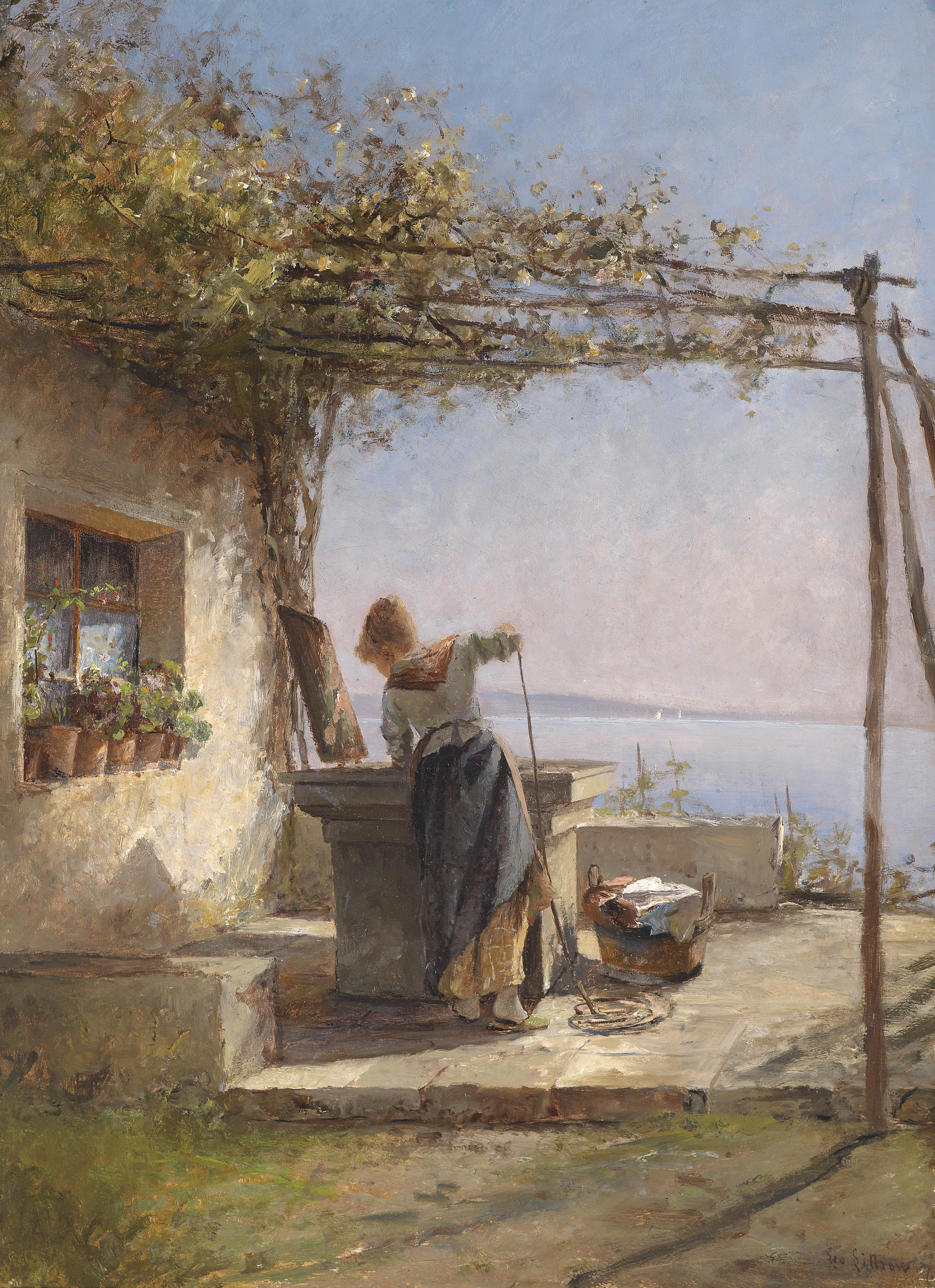
Wäschermädel am Brunnen

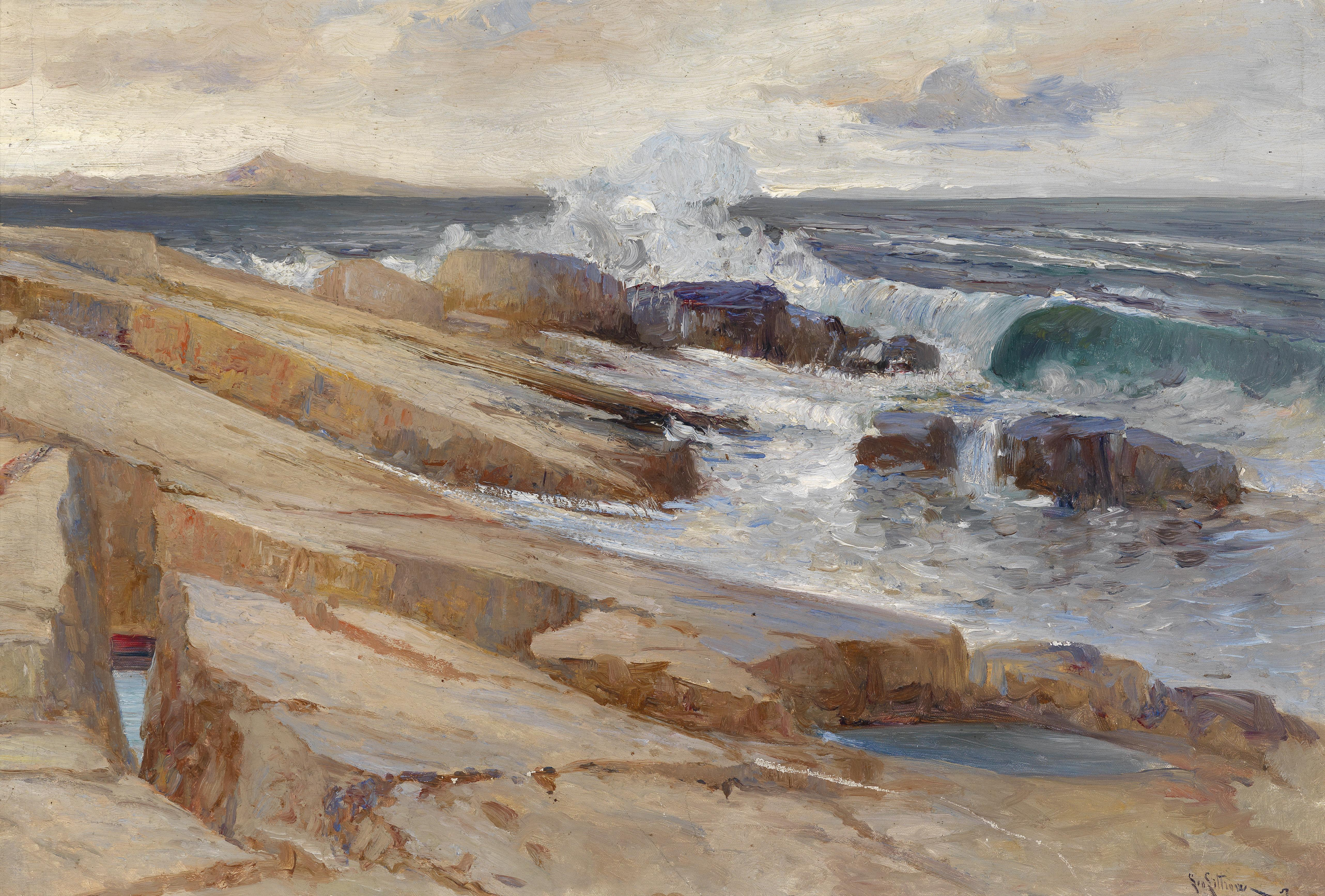
Küstenlandschaft bei Ragusa
