= Joseph Rheden =

Austrian astronomer (1873–1946)

- Born: 5 April 1873; Amlach, East Tyrol, Austria-Hungary
- Died: 6 August 1946 (aged 73); Lienz, Tyrol, Austria
- Education: University of Vienna
- Known for: Astrophotography
- Scientific career
- Fields: Astronomy
- Workplaces: Vienna Observatory

Joseph Rheden (5 April 1873 – 6 August 1946) was an Austrian astronomer, born in Amlach, East Tyrol, known for his astrographic observations of planets, minor planets and comets, and for the asteroids 744 Aguntina, 771 Libera, and 844 Leontina, which he discovered in 1913 and 1916, respectively.

After his studies in astronomy at the University of Vienna between 1897 and 1901, he worked at the Vienna Observatory, where he made his discoveries of three asteroids. Rheden was the son-in-law of astronomer Johann Palisa, a prolific discoverer of 122 minor planets, with whom he worked at the observatory. The asteroid 710 Gertrud was named after his daughter Gertrud Rheden and granddaughter of the discoverer, Johann Palisa. In 1946 he died at the age of 73 in Lienz, Tyrol.

Asteroids discovered: 3
744 Aguntina	26 February 1913
771 Libera	21 November 1913
844 Leontina	1 October 1916
