= 744 Aguntina =

Main-belt asteroid

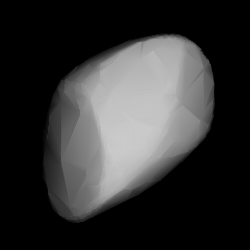
- Modelled shape of Aguntina from its lightcurve

Discovery
- Discovered by: J. Rheden
- Discovery site: Vienna Observatory
- Discovery date: 26 February 1913

Designations
- Pronunciation: /æɡənˈtaɪnə/
- Named after: Aguntum (ancient Roman town)
- Alternative designations: 1913 QW · 1930 DZ; 1950 TL_{4}
- Minor planet category: main-belt · (outer)

Orbital characteristics
- Epoch 31 July 2016 (JD 2457600.5)
- Uncertainty parameter 0
- Observation arc: 103.00 yr (37621 d)
- Aphelion: 3.5453 AU (530.37 Gm)
- Perihelion: 2.7953 AU (418.17 Gm)
- Semi-major axis: 3.1703 AU (474.27 Gm)
- Eccentricity: 0.11829
- Orbital period (sidereal): 5.64 yr (2061.8 d)
- Mean anomaly: 87.239°
- Mean motion: 0° 10^{m} 28.56^{s} / day
- Inclination: 7.7161°
- Longitude of ascending node: 142.67°
- Argument of perihelion: 28.637°
- Earth MOID: 1.80382 AU (269.848 Gm)
- Jupiter MOID: 1.44051 AU (215.497 Gm)
- T_{Jupiter}: 3.177

Physical characteristics
- Dimensions: 58.69±7.0 km (IRAS:25); 55.80±0.86 km 60.821±1.218 km 68.52±3.88 km
- Mean radius: 29.345±3.5 km
- Synodic rotation period: 17.47±0.05 h 17.5020±0.0544 h 17.47 h (0.728 d)
- Geometric albedo: 0.0423±0.012 (IRAS:25); 0.048±0.002; 0.0394±0.0087; 0.031±0.006
- Spectral type: B–V = 0.657; U–B = 0.161; Tholen = FX: F
- Absolute magnitude (H): 10.21

744 Aguntina, provisional designation 1913 QW, is a rare-type carbonaceous asteroid from the outer region of the asteroid belt, about 60 kilometers in diameter. It was discovered by Austrian astronomer Joseph Rheden at Vienna Observatory, Austria, on 26 February 1913.

The dark F-type asteroid, classified as a FX-subtype in the Tholen taxonomic scheme, orbits the Sun at a distance of 2.8–3.5 AU once every 5 years and 8 months (2,062 days). Its orbit is tilted by 8 degrees to the plane of the ecliptic and shows an eccentricity of 0.12.

Photometric observations during 2003 showed a rotation period of 17.47±0.05 hours with a brightness variation of 0.50±0.05 in magnitude. The period has since been confirmed by an additional observation. According to the surveys carried out by the Infrared Astronomical Satellite, IRAS, the Japanese Akari satellite, and the U.S. Wide-field Infrared Survey Explorer with its subsequent NEOWISE mission, the asteroid's surface has a very low albedo between 0.03 and 0.05 and a diameter estimate that varies between 55 and 68 kilometers.

The minor planet was named for the ancient Roman town, Aguntum, in the Noricum province of the Roman Empire, in what is nowadays mostly Austria. The naming information was given by the discoverer's widow, who was also the daughter of prolific astronomer Johann Palisa. The historic ruins are located close to Lienz in East Tyrol, the home town of the discoverer. In 1912, shortly before the minor planet's discovery, extensive excavations took place at the Roman site which unearthed coins, pottery masks, bronze objects, and painted tombstones.
