= Grubba =

Grubba may refer to:

- Andrzej Grubba, a Polish table tennis player
- Macho Grubba, a character in Paper Mario: The Thousand-Year Door
- Grubba the Hutt, a Star Wars character
- 1058 Grubba, an asteroid
