= 771 Libera =

Main-belt asteroid

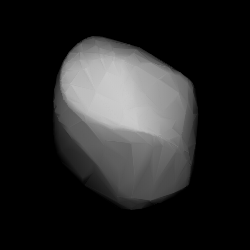
- Modelled shape of Libera from its lightcurve

Discovery
- Discovered by: J. Rheden
- Discovery site: Vienna Observatory
- Discovery date: 21 November 1913

Designations
- Pronunciation: Classically /ˈlɪbərə/
- Named after: friend of discoverer
- Alternative designations: 1913 TO · 1958 HA
- Minor planet category: main-belt · (middle)

Orbital characteristics
- Epoch 31 July 2016 (JD 2457600.5)
- Uncertainty parameter 0
- Observation arc: 101.75 yr (37166 d)
- Aphelion: 3.3092 AU (495.05 Gm)
- Perihelion: 1.9937 AU (298.25 Gm)
- Semi-major axis: 2.6514 AU (396.64 Gm)
- Eccentricity: 0.24808
- Orbital period (sidereal): 4.32 yr (1576.9 d)
- Mean anomaly: 268.14°
- Mean motion: 0° 13^{m} 41.844^{s} / day
- Inclination: 14.936°
- Longitude of ascending node: 218.19°
- Argument of perihelion: 227.36°
- Earth MOID: 1.03684 AU (155.109 Gm)
- Jupiter MOID: 2.11238 AU (316.008 Gm)
- T_{Jupiter}: 3.299

Physical characteristics
- Mean diameter: 32+2 −5 km
- Synodic rotation period: 5.890423±0.000003 h 5.892±0.002 h 5.92 h 5.886±0.001 h 5.89±0.05 h 5.892 h (0.2455 d)
- Pole ecliptic longitude: 64° ± 20°
- Pole ecliptic latitude: −78° ± 5°
- Geometric albedo: 0.13+0.05 −0.02; 0.1303±0.010 (IRAS:6); 0.141±0.008; 0.1299±0.0158; 0.1226 (SIMPS)
- Spectral type: B–V = 0.687; U–B = 0.300; X (Tholen), X (SMASS), X
- Absolute magnitude (H): 10.49; 10.3

771 Libera, provisional designation 1913 TO, is a metallic asteroid from the middle region of the asteroid belt, about 29 kilometers in diameter. It was discovered by Austrian astronomer Joseph Rheden at the Vienna Observatory in Austria, on 21 November 1913.

== Description ==
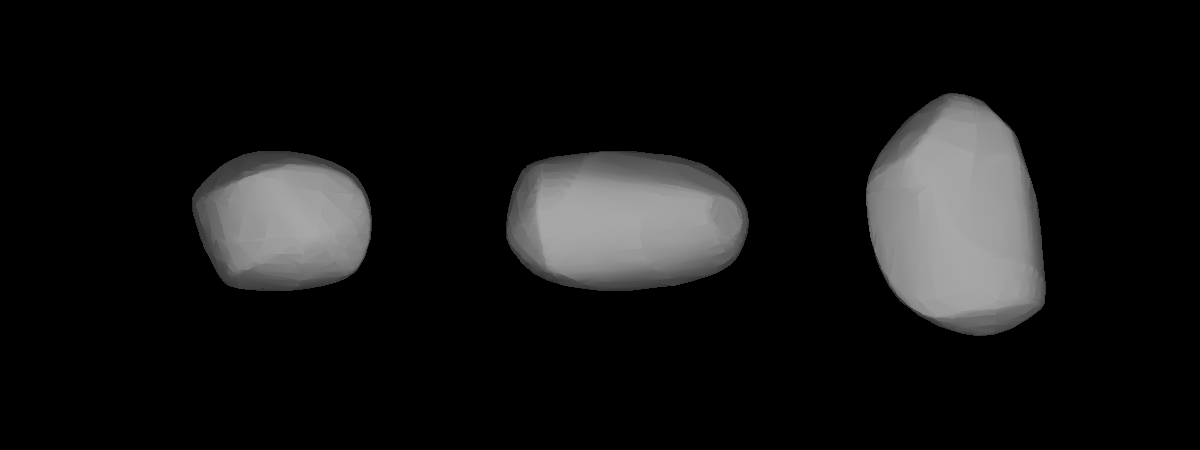
Lightcurve-based 3-D model of Libera

The metallic X-type asteroid orbits the Sun at a distance of 2.0–3.3 AU once every 4 years and 4 months (1,576 days). Its orbit shows an eccentricity of 0.25 and is tilted by 15 degrees to the plane of the ecliptic. A photometric observation of the asteroid's light-curve performed at the Palmer Divide Observatory during 1999 rendered a rotation period of 5.892±0.002 hours with a brightness variation of 0.57 magnitude. The result concurs with several previous observations, including a photometric analysis conducted over a twelve-year interval.

According to the surveys carried out by the Infrared Astronomical Satellite, IRAS, the Japanese Akari satellite, and the U.S. Wide-field Infrared Survey Explorer with its subsequent NEOWISE mission, the asteroid's surface has an albedo of 0.13 and 0.14, respectively. The Collaborative Asteroid Lightcurve Link publishes a slightly lower figure of 0.12 from an alternative result of the Supplemental IRAS Minor Planet Survey.

The minor planet was named by Mrs. Hedwig Rheden in honor of a friend of the discoverer.
