= 844 Leontina =

Main-belt asteroid

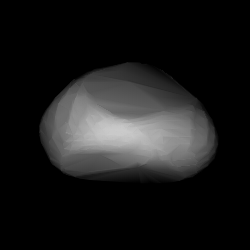
- Modelled shape of Leontina from its lightcurve

Discovery
- Discovered by: J. Rheden
- Discovery site: Vienna Obs.
- Discovery date: 1 October 1916

Designations
- Pronunciation: /liːɒnˈtaɪnə/
- Named after: Lienz (discoverer's home town)
- Alternative designations: 1916 AP · 1935 BN; 1953 FL_{1} · A902 EC
- Minor planet category: main-belt · (outer)

Orbital characteristics
- Epoch 31 July 2016 (JD 2457600.5)
- Uncertainty parameter 0
- Observation arc: 114.11 yr (41680 d)
- Aphelion: 3.4273 AU (512.72 Gm)
- Perihelion: 2.9894 AU (447.21 Gm)
- Semi-major axis: 3.2084 AU (479.97 Gm)
- Eccentricity: 0.068232
- Orbital period (sidereal): 5.75 yr (2099.0 d)
- Mean anomaly: 213.70°
- Mean motion: 0° 10^{m} 17.436^{s} / day
- Inclination: 8.7853°
- Longitude of ascending node: 348.76°
- Argument of perihelion: 351.03°

Physical characteristics
- Dimensions: 39.90±0.79 km 49.558±0.785 km 28.85±1.47 km 35.73 km (calculated)
- Synodic rotation period: 6.7859±0.0002 h 6.784±0.001 h 6.7965±0.0028 h 6.7859 h (0.28275 d)
- Geometric albedo: 0.200±0.010; 0.1255±0.0132; 0.307±0.036
- Spectral type: SMASS = X · S
- Absolute magnitude (H): 9.6

844 Leontina, provisional designation 1916 AP, is a stony asteroid from the outer region of the asteroid belt, about 36 kilometers in diameter. It was discovered on 1 October 1916, by Austrian astronomer Joseph Rheden at Vienna Observatory, Austria.

== Description ==
Leontina is an X-type asteroid in the SMASS classification. It orbits the Sun at a distance of 3.0–3.4 AU once every 5 years and 9 months (2,097 days). Its orbit is tilted by 9 degrees to the plane of the ecliptic and shows an eccentricity of 0.07.

Multiple lightcurve analysis rendered a well-defined, concurring rotation period of 6.79 hours. According to the surveys carried out by the Japanese Akari satellite and the U.S. Wide-field Infrared Survey Explorer with its subsequent NEOWISE mission, measurements of the body's brightness gave a divergent albedo of 0.13, 0.20 and 0.31, respectively. As a result, the asteroid's estimated diameter strongly varies between 28 and 40 kilometers. The Collaborative Asteroid Lightcurve Link (CALL) considers Akari's albedo-figure of 0.20 the most accurate one and consequently assumes the otherwise classified X-type body to be of a stony surface composition with a calculated diameter of 36 kilometers.

This minor planet was named by the discoverer for his home town Lienz in East Tyrol, Austria.
