= 722 Frieda =

Bright background asteroid and slow rotator

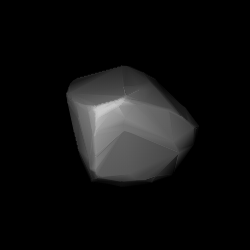
- Modelled shape of Frieda from its lightcurve

Discovery
- Discovered by: J. Palisa
- Discovery site: Vienna Obs.
- Discovery date: 18 October 1911

Designations
- Pronunciation: German: [ˈfʁiːdaː]
- Named after: Frieda Hillebrand, daughter and grand-daughter of: Karl Hillebrand (1861–1939); Edmund Weiss (1837–1917)
- Alternative designations: A911 UN · 1926 GR; 1946 SH · 1911 NA
- Minor planet category: main-belt · (inner); background

Orbital characteristics
- Epoch 31 May 2020 (JD 2459000.5)
- Uncertainty parameter 0
- Observation arc: 109.52 yr (40,002 d)
- Aphelion: 2.4858 AU
- Perihelion: 1.8575 AU
- Semi-major axis: 2.1717 AU
- Eccentricity: 0.1447
- Orbital period (sidereal): 3.20 yr (1,169 d)
- Mean anomaly: 47.845°
- Mean motion: 0° 18^{m} 28.8^{s} / day
- Inclination: 5.6371°
- Longitude of ascending node: 45.668°
- Argument of perihelion: 257.23°

Physical characteristics
- Mean diameter: 8.257±0.073 km; 11.43±0.23 km
- Synodic rotation period: 131.1±0.2 h
- Geometric albedo: 0.201±0.009; 0.435±0.069
- Spectral type: S (SMASS-I)
- Absolute magnitude (H): 12.10; 12.30

722 Frieda (prov. designation: A911 UN or 1911 NA) is a bright background asteroid and slow rotator from the inner regions of the asteroid belt. It was discovered by Austrian astronomer Johann Palisa at the Vienna Observatory on 18 October 1911. The stony S-type asteroid has a notably long rotation period of 131.1 hours and measures approximately 9 kilometers (6 miles) in diameter. It was named after Frieda Hillebrand, daughter of Austrian astronomer Karl Hillebrand (1861–1939), and grand-daughter of Edmund Weiss (1837–1917) who had been the director of the discovering observatory.

== Orbit and classification ==
Located in the region of the Flora family (402), the largest family of stony asteroids, Frieda is a non-family asteroid of the main belt's background population when applying the hierarchical clustering method to its proper orbital elements. It orbits the Sun in the inner asteroid belt at a distance of 1.9–2.5 AU once every 3 years and 2 months (1,169 days; semi-major axis of 2.17 AU). Its orbit has an eccentricity of 0.14 and an inclination of 6° with respect to the ecliptic. The body's observation arc begins at Heidelberg Observatory on 19 January 1912, or three months after its official discovery observation by Johann Palisa at Vienna Observatory.

== Naming ==
According to Alexander Schnell, this minor planet was named after Frieda Hillebrand, daughter of Austrian astronomer and professor at Graz University, Karl Hillebrand (1861–1939). Frieda is also the grand-daughter of astronomer Edmund Weiss (1837–1917), who was director of the Vienna Observatory (1877–1908) where this asteroid was discovered. The naming citation was not mentioned in The Names of the Minor Planets by Paul Herget in 1955. Palisa also named asteroid 794 Irenaea after Frieda's mother, Irene Hillebrand (née Weiss).

== Physical characteristics ==
In the SMASS-I classification by Xu (1995), Frieda is a common, stony S-type asteroid.

=== Rotation period ===
In April 2019, a rotational lightcurve of Frieda was obtained for the first time from 12 nights of photometric observations by American amateur astronomer Tom Polakis at the Command Module Observatory (V02) in Arizona. Lightcurve analysis gave a rotation period of 131.1±0.2 hours with a high brightness variation of 0.45±0.05 magnitude (U=2).

=== Diameter and albedo ===
According to the surveys carried out by the NEOWISE mission of NASA's Wide-field Infrared Survey Explorer (WISE) and the Japanese Akari satellite, Frieda measures (8.257±0.073) and (11.43±0.23) kilometers in diameter and its surface has an albedo of (0.435±0.069) and (0.201±0.009), respectively.

The Collaborative Asteroid Lightcurve Link adopts Petr Pravec's revised WISE-data, with an albedo of 0.2721 and a diameter of 8.794 kilometers based on an absolute magnitude of 12.31. Alternative mean-diameters published by the WISE team include (8.835±0.044 km), (9.19±0.22 km) and (10.51±2.46 km) with a corresponding albedo of (0.3309±0.3309), (0.252±0.025) and (0.23±0.10).
