= 254 Augusta =

Main-belt asteroid

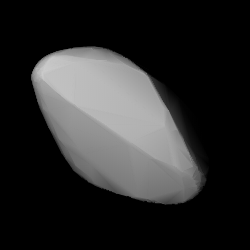
- Modelled shape of Augusta from its lightcurve

Discovery
- Discovered by: J. Palisa
- Discovery site: Vienna Obs.
- Discovery date: 31 March 1886

Designations
- Pronunciation: /ɒˈɡʌstə/
- Named after: Auguste von Littrow
- Alternative designations: A886 FA
- Minor planet category: Augusta · main-belt

Orbital characteristics
- Epoch 31 July 2016 (JD 2457600.5)
- Uncertainty parameter 0
- Observation arc: 130.04 yr (47498 d)
- Aphelion: 2.4613 AU (368.21 Gm)
- Perihelion: 1.9281 AU (288.44 Gm)
- Semi-major axis: 2.1947 AU (328.32 Gm)
- Eccentricity: 0.12147
- Orbital period (sidereal): 3.25 yr (1187.5 d)
- Average orbital speed: 20.1 km/s
- Mean anomaly: 340.92°
- Mean motion: 0° 18^{m} 11.34^{s} / day
- Inclination: 4.5131°
- Longitude of ascending node: 28.473°
- Argument of perihelion: 233.14°
- Earth MOID: 0.916708 AU (137.1376 Gm)
- Jupiter MOID: 2.58938 AU (387.366 Gm)
- T_{Jupiter}: 3.656

Physical characteristics
- Dimensions: 12.11±1.1 km
- Synodic rotation period: 5.8949 h (0.24562 d)
- Geometric albedo: 0.1695±0.036
- Spectral type: B–V = 0.845; U–B = 0.505; Tholen = S
- Absolute magnitude (H): 12.13

254 Augusta is a main-belt asteroid, discovered on 31 March 1886 by astronomer Johann Palisa at Vienna Observatory, Austria. The stony S-type asteroid measures about 12 kilometers in diameter. It is the first-numbered member of the Augusta family, after which the small Asteroid family and subgroup of the main-belt has been named. Augusta was named after the German–Austrian writer Auguste von Littrow (1819–1890), widow of astronomer Carl Ludwig von Littrow, who was a former director of the Vienna Observatory.
