= Heinrich von Littrow =

Austrian cartographer and writer

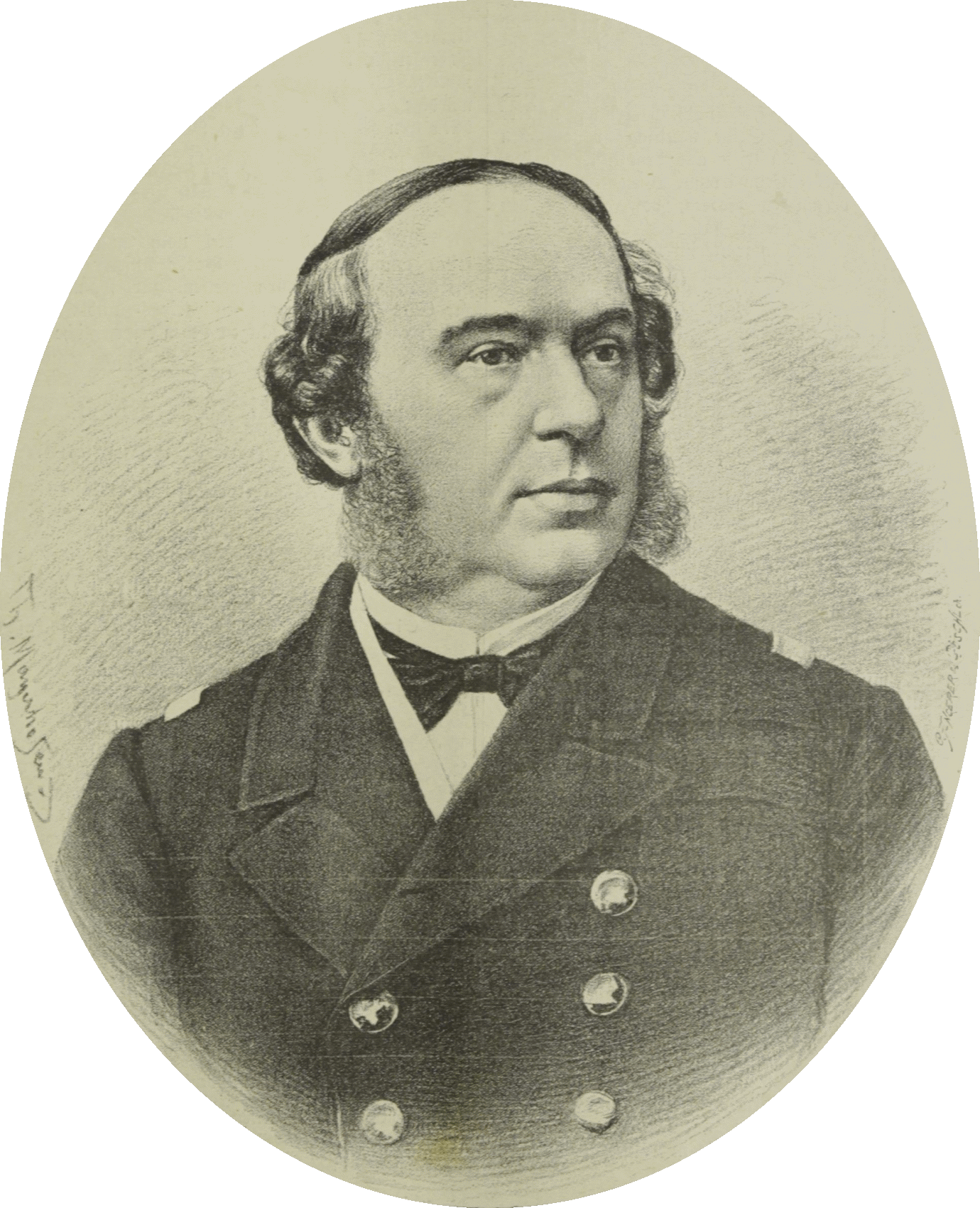
Heinrich von Littrow

Heinrich von Littrow (26 January 1820 – 25 April 1895) was an Austrian cartographer and writer, and a convinced advocate of the universalist mission of the Austro-Hungarian empire.

== Life ==
Heinrich von Littrow was born on 26 January 1820 in Vienna. He was a son of the astronomer Joseph Johann von Littrow, ennobled in 1836, and his wife Karoline von Ulrichsthal. Among his twelve brothers, Karl Ludwig von Littrow was a prominent astronomer. His daughter Lea von Littrow became a noted Fiuman painter.

After graduating from high school, Littrow entered the Austrian Naval Cadet School at Venice as a cadet. In addition to his theoretical training, he also served on various imperial warships.

In 1840 he finished his naval training as the best of his year and therefore was sent to the University Observatory in Vienna for further studies - "higher astronomy". There he was a student of his father for some time and, after his father's unexpected death in 1841, also a student of his brother Karl Ludwig.

In 1845 Littrow was appointed professor for stylistics and as a supplement (assistant teacher) for mathematics and nautical science at the naval academy. There he soon made friends with his colleague, the writer Heinrich Wilhelm Stieglitz. The political events led to the transfer of Littrow's academy to Trieste, and he was also involved as an officer in the blockade of Venice. The latter successful, he was awarded the Military Merit Order after the capture of Venice.

From 1850 Littrow carried out important preparatory work to improve the Austrian navy. From 1852 he introduced the use of colored plastic in sea charts, which soon became the common standard and together with Admiral Baron Bernhard von Wüllerstorf-Urbair he worked on the reorganization of the imperial navy. With his colleague Gustav Stelczyk, Littrow created a trend-setting relief of the Adriatic Sea. Quasi on the side, Littrow developed an inexpensive method to repair quickly the destroyed port of Pesaro and to put it back into operation. For this he was appointed "patrician" of Pesaro and Pope Pius IX. awarded him the Order of St. Sylvester.

In 1857 Littrow was promoted to frigate captain and stationed in Trieste. In addition to his official duties, he was also culturally involved. In addition to his regular popular science lectures, he was also instrumental in founding the Schiller Association in Trieste. With its diverse activities, this association was an important social center of the city for many years.

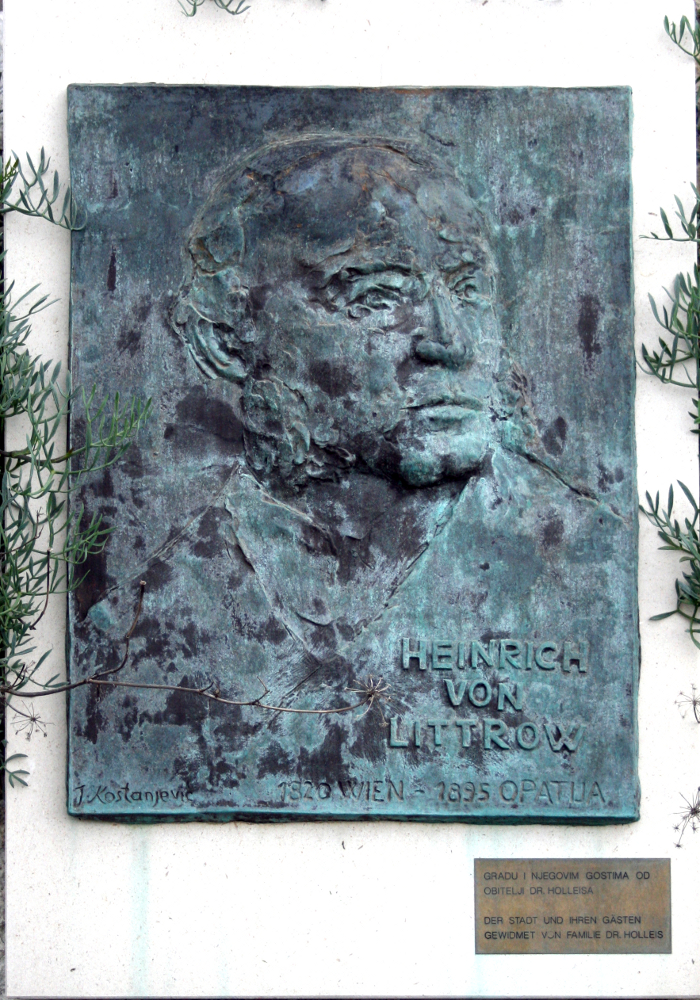
Relief portrait of Heinrich von Littrow

Littrow was a friend of the composer Franz von Suppé. The text for the popular aria Hab ich nur deine Liebe, die Treue brauch ich nicht in Suppé's operetta Boccaccio from 1879 does not come from the librettists Friedrich Zell and Richard Genée, but from Littrow. He had already published the short poem in 1857 under the title Liebe und Treue in his volume of poems Aus der See. In his poetry, Littrow often called for the unity of mankind, exalted the multiculturalism of Ciotta's Fiume in which he lived, and spoke against all nationalisms and in favour of what he saw as a universalist and humanist mission for his homeland.

Littrow was hired by Freiherr Karl Ludwig von Bruck as captain for the Austrian Lloyd. For a few years, Littrow commanded vessels for this in the Adriatic regular service until he was entrusted with the management of the nautical academy in Trieste.

Heinrich von Littrow died on 25 April 1895 at the age of 75 years in Abbazia (today Opatija, Croatia).

== Books by Heinrich von Littrow ==
=== Cartography ===
- Aus dem Seeleben, 1892
- Die Marine, 1848
- Die Semmeringfahrt, 1883
- Deutsches Marine-Wörterbuch
- Handbuch der Seemannschaft. Verlag Gerold, Vienna 1859.

=== Fiction ===
- Seemöven. Gedichte 1857
- Von Wien nach Triest, 1863
- Der Kuss. Lustspiel
- Eine gute Lehre. Lustspiel
- Xanthippe. Lustspiel
