= George Ambrose Pogson =

British diplomat (1853–1914)

George Ambrose Pogson (30 December 1853 – 23 August 1914) was a British diplomate who was the British Consul in Hamburg from 1880 to 1914.

Pogson was born in Headington, Oxfordshire, the son of astronomer Norman Robert Pogson, he had 12 full siblings and two half-siblings. He was married twice. In his first marriage he had a son, Norman Ambrose. His second wife, whom he met in Germany, was Bertha (née Heinemann).

Pogson died in Puerto Rico in 1914. He was buried at sea.
