= 266 Aline =

Main-belt asteroid

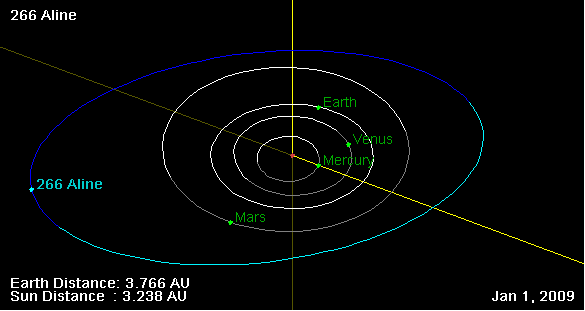
- Orbit of Aline

Discovery
- Discovered by: Johann Palisa
- Discovery date: 17 May 1887

Designations
- Alternative designations: A887 KA
- Minor planet category: Main belt

Orbital characteristics
- Epoch 31 July 2016 (JD 2457600.5)
- Uncertainty parameter 0
- Observation arc: 124.91 yr (45623 d)
- Aphelion: 3.24229 AU (485.040 Gm)
- Perihelion: 2.36559 AU (353.887 Gm)
- Semi-major axis: 2.80394 AU (419.463 Gm)
- Eccentricity: 0.15633
- Orbital period (sidereal): 4.70 yr (1715.0 d)
- Average orbital speed: 17.79 km/s
- Mean anomaly: 53.2036°
- Mean motion: 0° 12^{m} 35.708^{s} / day
- Inclination: 13.3989°
- Longitude of ascending node: 235.904°
- Argument of perihelion: 150.489°

Physical characteristics
- Mean diameter: 104.96±4.95 km (composite estimate); 109.09±2.9 km
- Mass: (1.43 ± 0.693) × 10^{18} kg (composite estimate)
- Mean density: 2.36 ± 1.19 g/cm^{3}
- Synodic rotation period: 13.018 h (0.5424 d); 13.02 h
- Geometric albedo: 0.0448±0.003
- Spectral type: C
- Absolute magnitude (H): 8.80

266 Aline is a fairly large main belt asteroid that was discovered by Johann Palisa on 17 May 1887 in Vienna and is thought to have been named after the daughter of astronomer Edmund Weiss. It is a dark C-type asteroid and is probably composed of primitive carbonaceous material. 266 Aline is orbiting close to a 5:2 mean motion resonance with Jupiter, which is located at 2.824 AU.

Photometric observations made in 2012 at the Organ Mesa Observatory in Las Cruces, New Mexico, produced a light curve with a period of 13.018 ± 0.001 hours and a brightness variation of 0.10 ± 0.01 in magnitude.

In 2001, the asteroid was detected by radar from the Arecibo Observatory at a distance of 1.41 AU. The resulting data yielded an effective diameter of 109 ± 15 km.
