= Augusta family =

The Augusta family is a small asteroid family in the inner asteroid belt according to a HCM-study conducted by Italian astronomer Vincenzo Zappalà and colleges in 1995. The largest members of this family include 254 Augusta (parent body) and 5535 Annefrank (1942 EM). In this study, a total of 23 members were identified out of a small data set of 12,487 asteroids. A more recent HCM-study by Nesvorný in 2014 no longer includes this family.

== Members ==
This is the complete list of members of the Augusta family as identified by Zappalà (1995). They are grouped into the larger complex of the Flora family by Nesvorný (2014), except for five asteroids, which were reassigned to the main belt's background population (marked as BG).

- 254 Augusta
- 1058 Grubba
- 1608 Muñoz
- 1830 Pogson
- 2121 Sevastopol
- 3355 Onizuka
- 3813 Fortov
- 5535 Annefrank
- (5602) 1991 VM1 (BG)
- 5873 Archilochos
- 6089 Izumi (BG)
- (6303) 1989 EL2
- 6312 Robheinlein (BG)
- 6556 Arcimboldo
- 8817 Roytraver
- 9282 Lucylim (BG)
- (10503) 1987 SG13
- 10760 Ozeki
- (12989) 1981 EV_{9}
- (35113) 1992 CR_{2} (BG)
- (52151) 1180 T-1
- (52186) 4072 T-2
- (58099) 1978 RB_{10}
