= Pogson (crater) =

Crater on the Moon

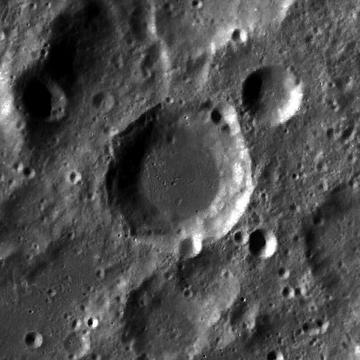
- LRO WAC image
- Coordinates: 42.2°S 110.5°E
- Diameter: 50 km
- Depth: Unknown
- Colongitude: 250° at sunrise
- Eponym: Norman Pogson

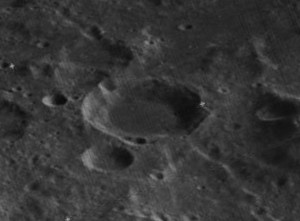
Oblique view from Lunar Orbiter 3, facing south

Pogson is a lunar impact crater on the Moon's far side, behind the southeastern limb. It is located midway between the flooded crater Lebedev to the southwest and Bjerknes to the northeast. Farther west of Pogson is the uneven Mare Australe.

This is a circular crater with a somewhat worn rim. A small craterlet lies across the southern rim, and pair is located long the northeastern rim. The interior floor has a slightly lower albedo than the surroundings, and is level and nearly featureless.

== Satellite craters ==
By convention these features are identified on lunar maps by placing the letter on the side of the crater midpoint that is closest to Pogson.

Pogson	Latitude	Longitude	Diameter
C	41.5° S	111.5° E	20 km
F	42.0° S	114.6° E	35 km
G	42.7° S	112.7° E	39 km

== See also ==
- Asteroid 1830 Pogson
