= 6312 Robheinlein =

Augusta or background asteroid from the inner regions of the asteroid belt

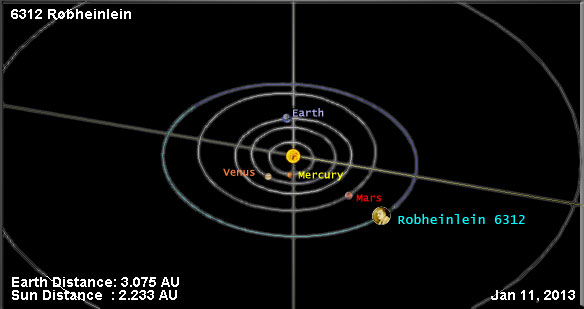
- Orbital diagram of Robheinlein

Discovery
- Discovered by: H. E. Holt
- Discovery site: Palomar Obs.
- Discovery date: 14 September 1990

Designations
- Named after: Robert A. Heinlein (science fiction writer)
- Alternative designations: 1990 RH_{4} · 1982 BW_{2}
- Minor planet category: main-belt · (inner) background · Augusta

Orbital characteristics
- Epoch 23 March 2018 (JD 2458200.5)
- Uncertainty parameter 0
- Observation arc: 36.26 yr (13,244 d)
- Aphelion: 2.3358 AU
- Perihelion: 2.0321 AU
- Semi-major axis: 2.1839 AU
- Eccentricity: 0.0695
- Orbital period (sidereal): 3.23 yr (1,179 d)
- Mean anomaly: 114.41°
- Mean motion: 0° 18^{m} 19.44^{s} / day
- Inclination: 4.1155°
- Longitude of ascending node: 157.25°
- Argument of perihelion: 283.14°

Physical characteristics
- Mean diameter: 3.588±0.657 km
- Geometric albedo: 0.314±0.109
- Spectral type: L (SDSS-MOC)
- Absolute magnitude (H): 14.1

6312 Robheinlein (prov. designation: 1990 RH_{4}) is a bright Augusta or background asteroid from the inner regions of the asteroid belt, that measures approximately 3.5 kilometers (2.2 miles) in diameter. It was discovered on 14 September 1990, by American astronomer Henry Holt at the Palomar Observatory in California. The uncommon L-type asteroid was named for American science fiction writer Robert A. Heinlein.

== Orbit and classification ==
When applying the hierarchical clustering method to the asteroid's proper orbital elements, Robheinlein is considered to be a member of the Augusta family (as per Zappalà) as well as a non-family asteroid from the main belt's background population (as per Nesvorný).

It orbits the Sun in the inner asteroid belt at a distance of 2.0–2.3 AU once every 3 years and 3 months (1,179 days; semi-major axis of 2.18 AU). Its orbit has an eccentricity of 0.07 and an inclination of 4° with respect to the ecliptic. The body's observation arc begins with its first observation as 1982 BW_{2} at the Kleť Observatory in January 1982, more than 8 years prior to its official discovery observation at Palomar.

== Naming ==
Based on a suggestion by Belgian amateur astronomer Jean Meeus, this minor planet was named after Robert Anson Heinlein (1907–1988), the Dean of Science Fiction, author of the 1961 mainstream literary classic Stranger in a Strange Land, and science fiction novels such as Starship Troopers and The Moon is a Harsh Mistress. The official naming citation was published by the Minor Planet Center on 13 April 2006 (M.P.C. 56611).

Heinlein helped narrate The Moon Landing with Walter Cronkite on CBS in 1969, was involved in the planning of the Star Wars Defense program in the 1980s, contributed the words Waldo and Grok to the English language, and popularized the phrases Space Marine, TANSTAAFL, and Pay it Forward.

== Physical characteristics ==
Robheinlein is an L-type asteroid in the SDSS-based taxonomy. It has an absolute magnitude of 14.1. As of 2018, no rotational lightcurve has been obtained from photometric observations. The body's rotation period, pole and shape remain unknown.

=== Diameter and albedo ===
According to the survey carried out by the NEOWISE mission of NASA's Wide-field Infrared Survey Explorer, Robheinlein measures 3.588 kilometers in diameter and its surface has a high albedo of 0.314.
