= 265 Anna =

Main-belt asteroid

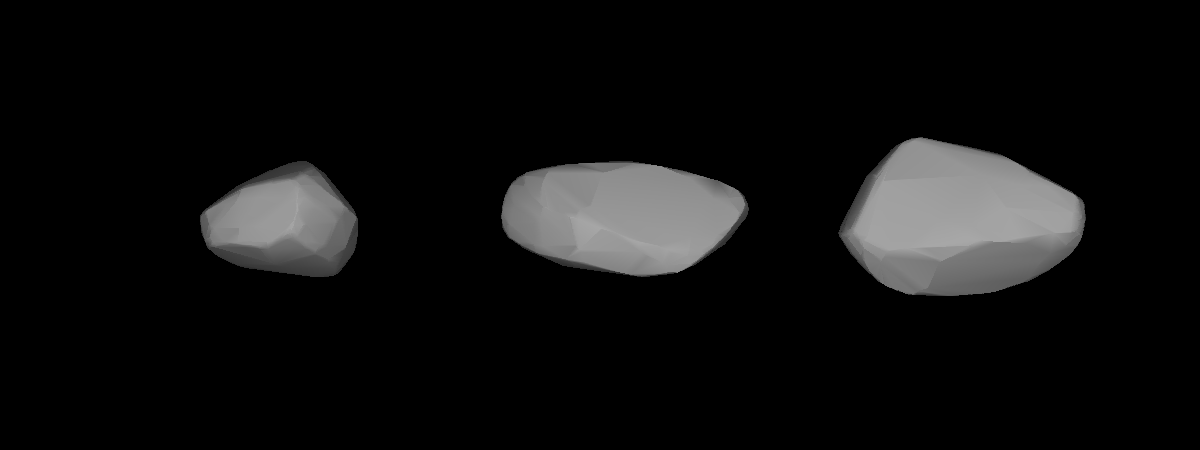
- A three-dimensional model of 265 Anna based on its lightcurve

Discovery
- Discovered by: Johann Palisa
- Discovery date: 25 February 1887

Designations
- Pronunciation: /ˈænə/
- Named after: Anny Weiss
- Alternative designations: A887 DA, 1933 QN; 1933 RC
- Minor planet category: Main belt

Orbital characteristics
- Epoch 31 July 2016 (JD 2457600.5)
- Uncertainty parameter 0
- Observation arc: 115.71 yr (42263 d)
- Aphelion: 3.06672 AU (458.775 Gm)
- Perihelion: 1.77398 AU (265.384 Gm)
- Semi-major axis: 2.42035 AU (362.079 Gm)
- Eccentricity: 0.26706
- Orbital period (sidereal): 3.77 yr (1375.4 d)
- Mean anomaly: 84.9293°
- Mean motion: 0° 15^{m} 42.3^{s} / day
- Inclination: 25.6443°
- Longitude of ascending node: 335.566°
- Argument of perihelion: 251.567°

Physical characteristics
- Dimensions: 23.66±3.0 km
- Synodic rotation period: 11.681 h (0.4867 d)
- Geometric albedo: 0.1045±0.033
- Absolute magnitude (H): 11.9

265 Anna is a typical Main belt asteroid.

It was discovered by Johann Palisa on 25 February 1887 in Vienna and was probably named after Anny Weiss (née Kretschmar), the daughter-in-law of astronomer Edmund Weiss.
