= 229 Adelinda =

Main-belt asteroid

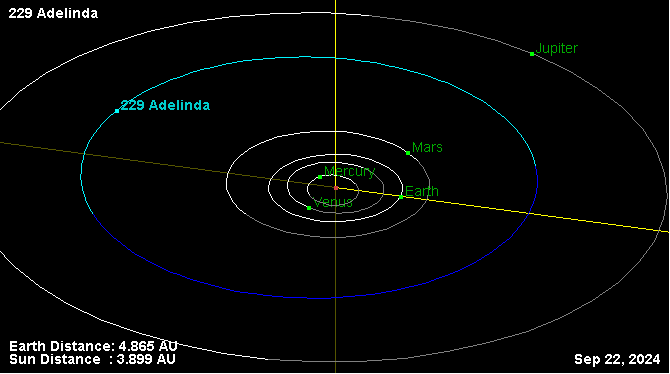
- Orbital diagram

Discovery
- Discovered by: Johann Palisa
- Discovery date: 22 August 1882

Designations
- Pronunciation: /ædəˈlɪndə/
- Alternative designations: A882 QB, 1908 UG; 1946 UK, 1981 GU_{1}
- Minor planet category: Main belt (Cybele)

Orbital characteristics
- Epoch 31 July 2016 (JD 2457600.5)
- Uncertainty parameter 0
- Observation arc: 131.10 yr (47884 d)
- Aphelion: 3.89751 AU (583.059 Gm)
- Perihelion: 2.94561 AU (440.657 Gm)
- Semi-major axis: 3.42156 AU (511.858 Gm)
- Eccentricity: 0.13910
- Orbital period (sidereal): 6.33 yr (2311.7 d)
- Average orbital speed: 16.12 km/s
- Mean anomaly: 78.0401°
- Mean motion: 0° 9^{m} 20.621^{s} / day
- Inclination: 2.07871°
- Longitude of ascending node: 28.0490°
- Argument of perihelion: 311.263°

Physical characteristics
- Dimensions: 106±2 km
- Synodic rotation period: 6.60 h (0.275 d)
- Geometric albedo: 0.0453±0.004
- Spectral type: C
- Absolute magnitude (H): 9.13

229 Adelinda is a large, dark outer main-belt asteroid. It was discovered by Austrian astronomer Johann Palisa on August 22, 1882, in Vienna, and was named after Adelinda, the wife of fellow Austrian astronomer Edmund Weiss.

This object is classified as a C-type asteroid and is probably composed of primitive carbonaceous material. 229 Adelinda is part of the Cybele asteroid group.
