= 245 Vera =

Asteroid

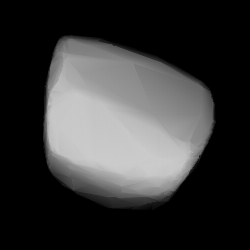
- 3D model based on lightcurve data

Discovery
- Discovered by: N. R. Pogson
- Discovery date: 6 February 1885

Designations
- Pronunciation: /ˈvɪərə/
- Alternative designations: A885 CA, 1919 HB
- Minor planet category: Main belt

Orbital characteristics
- Epoch 31 July 2016 (JD 2457600.5)
- Uncertainty parameter 0
- Observation arc: 131.06 yr (47,869 d)
- Aphelion: 3.70600 AU (554.410 Gm)
- Perihelion: 2.50409 AU (374.607 Gm)
- Semi-major axis: 3.10504 AU (464.507 Gm)
- Eccentricity: 0.19354
- Orbital period (sidereal): 5.47 yr (1,998.5 d)
- Average orbital speed: 16.93 km/s
- Mean anomaly: 120.926°
- Mean motion: 0° 10^{m} 48.493^{s} / day
- Inclination: 5.15859°
- Longitude of ascending node: 61.2968°
- Argument of perihelion: 329.674°

Physical characteristics
- Dimensions: 79.50±3.2 km
- Synodic rotation period: 14.38 h (0.599 d)
- Geometric albedo: 0.2082±0.018
- Temperature: unknown
- Spectral type: S
- Absolute magnitude (H): 7.82

245 Vera is a large Main belt asteroid. It was discovered by N. R. Pogson on February 6, 1885, in Madras, and was named at the suggestion of his wife. The asteroid orbits the Sun at a distance of 3.11 AU with a period of 5.47 years and an eccentricity (ovalness) of 0.19. The orbital plane is tilted at an angle of 5.16° to the plane of the ecliptic. In 1890, Daniel Kirkwood noted that this asteroid shares similar orbital elements with 86 Semele and 106 Dione.

Photometric measurements of this asteroid made during 1980–1981 were used to produce a light curve that demonstrated a rotation period of 14.38±0.03 h with a brightness variation of 0.26±0.01 in magnitude. It is classified as a stony S-type asteroid in the Tholen system. The asteroid has an estimated diameter of 75.95±2.63 km based on near infrared observations.
