= 46 Hestia =

Main-belt asteroid

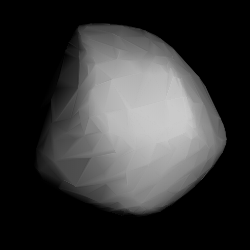
- 3D convex shape model of 46 Hestia

Discovery
- Discovered by: Norman Robert Pogson
- Discovery date: 16 August 1857

Designations
- Pronunciation: /ˈhɛstiə/
- Named after: Hestia
- Minor planet category: main belt

Orbital characteristics
- Epoch 31 December 2006 (JD 2454100.5)
- Aphelion: 2.961 AU (442.886 million km)
- Perihelion: 2.091 AU (312.736 million km)
- Semi-major axis: 2.526 AU (377.811 million km)
- Eccentricity: 0.172
- Orbital period (sidereal): 4.01 a (1465.958 d)
- Mean anomaly: 45.401°
- Inclination: 2.342°
- Longitude of ascending node: 181.168°
- Argument of perihelion: 176.882°

Physical characteristics
- Mean diameter: 125.29±5.21 km (composite estimate); 124.1 km
- Mass: (1.30±0.10)×10^{18} kg (Note: Calculated from its standard gravitational parameter GM = 0.087±0.007 km^{3}/s^{2}.)
- Mean density: 1.09 g/cm^{3} (Note: Assuming a diameter of 131 km.)
- Synodic rotation period: 21.04 h
- Geometric albedo: 0.052
- Spectral type: C
- Absolute magnitude (H): 8.36

46 Hestia is a large, dark main-belt asteroid. It is also the primary body of the Hestia clump, a group of asteroids with similar orbits.

Hestia was discovered by N. R. Pogson on 16 August 1857, at the Radcliffe Observatory, Oxford. Pogson awarded the honour of naming it to William Henry Smyth, the previous owner of the telescope used for the discovery. Smyth chose to name it after Hestia, Greek goddess of the hearth. This created a problem in Greek, where 4 Vesta also goes by the name Hestia.

The computed Lyapunov time for this asteroid is 30,000 years, indicating that it occupies a chaotic orbit that will change randomly over time because of gravitational perturbations of the planets.

Hestia has been studied by radar. 13-cm radar observations of this asteroid from the Arecibo Observatory between 1980 and 1985 were used to produce a diameter estimate of 131 km. In 1988 a search for satellites or dust orbiting this asteroid was performed using the UH88 telescope at the Mauna Kea Observatories, but the effort came up empty.

== Properties ==
Photometric observations made in 2012 at the Organ Mesa Observatory in Las Cruces, New Mexico produced a light curve with a period of 21.040 ± 0.001 hours. There are two brightness minima, having luminosity variations of 0.05 and 0.12 in magnitude, respectively.

In 2000, Michalak estimated Hestia to have a mass of 3.5×10^{18} kg. (Note: (2000 mass estimate of 46 Hestia 0.018 / Mass of Ceres 4.75) * Mass of Ceres 9.43E+20 = 3.573E+18)

Even though Hestia is only about 124 km in diameter, in 1997, Bange and Bec-Borsenberger estimated Hestia as having a mass of 2.1×10^{19} kg, based on a perturbation by 19 Fortuna. (Note: (Older mass estimate of Hestia 0.109 / Mass of Ceres 4.75) * Mass of Ceres 9.43E+20 = 2.163E+19) This older 1997 estimate would give it a density of 14+ g/cm^{3} and make Hestia more massive than several much larger asteroids.
