= 80 Sappho =

Main-belt asteroid

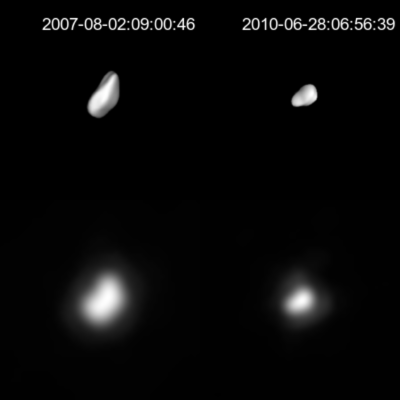
- Lightcurve-based 3D-model of Sappho on the top and the image on the bottom.

Discovery
- Discovered by: N. R. Pogson
- Discovery site: Madras Obs.
- Discovery date: 2 May 1864

Designations
- Pronunciation: /ˈsæfoʊ/
- Named after: Sappho (Greek poet)
- Minor planet category: main-belt · (inner)
- Adjectives: Sapphonian /sæˈfoʊniən/ Sapphoian /sæˈfoʊ.iən/
- Symbol: (astrological)

Orbital characteristics
- Epoch 4 September 2017 (JD 2458000.5)
- Uncertainty parameter 0
- Aphelion: 2.7544 AU (412.05 Gm)
- Perihelion: 1.8370 AU (274.81 Gm)
- Semi-major axis: 2.2957 AU (343.43 Gm)
- Eccentricity: 0.19980
- Orbital period (sidereal): 3.48 yr (1270.5 d)
- Mean anomaly: 287.260°
- Mean motion: 0° 17^{m} 0.06^{s} / day
- Inclination: 8.676°
- Longitude of ascending node: 218.699°
- Argument of perihelion: 139.662°
- Earth MOID: 0.843652 AU (126.2085 Gm)
- Jupiter MOID: 2.7319 AU (408.69 Gm)
- T_{Jupiter}: 3.553

Physical characteristics
- Mean diameter: 66±8 km
- Mass: (4.6 ± 2.11/0.86)×10^{17} kg (4.3±1.6)×10^{17} kg (Note: Calculated from its standard gravitational parameter GM = 0.029±0.011 km^{3}/s^{2}.)
- Mean density: 3.055 ± 1.400/0.569 g/cm^{3} 2.87±1.50 g/cm^{3}
- Synodic rotation period: 14.03086 h
- Pole ecliptic longitude: 195° ± 2°
- Pole ecliptic latitude: −22° ± 3°
- Geometric albedo: 0.206±0.014; 0.185
- Spectral type: S-type asteroid
- Apparent magnitude: 9.38 to 13.6
- Absolute magnitude (H): 7.98

80 Sappho (symbol:) is a large, S-type (stony) main-belt asteroid. It was discovered by English astronomer Norman Pogson on 2 May 1864, and is named after Sappho, the Archaic Greece poet. The asteroid is orbiting the Sun at a distance of 2.2957 AU with a period of 3.48 years and an eccentricity (ovalness) of 0.2. The orbital plane is inclined at an angle of 8.68° to the plane of the ecliptic.

13-cm radar observations of this asteroid from the Arecibo Observatory between 1980 and 1985 were used to produce a diameter estimate of 83 kilometres (52 mi). Hanuš et al. (2013) confirmed the polar axis has ecliptic coordinates (λ, β) = (194°, −26°) and listed a rotation period of 14.03087 h.

Sappho (at apparent magnitude 11.8) occulted the magnitude 7.2 star HIP 24403 in the constellation of Taurus on 16 September 2018 at 8:54 UT. Sacramento and Salt Lake City were the two major cities located underneath the shadow path. Data from this event will help improve the shape model of the asteroid. During the occultation the asteroid was roughly 1.6 AU (240,000,000 km; 150,000,000 mi) from Earth with an uncertainty of ±76 km.
