= 1058 Grubba =

Main-belt asteroid

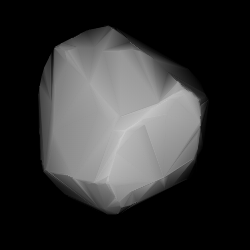
- Modelled shape of Grubba from its lightcurve

Discovery
- Discovered by: G. Shajn
- Discovery site: Simeiz Obs.
- Discovery date: 22 June 1925

Designations
- Named after: Howard Grubb (Irish telescope maker)
- Alternative designations: 1925 MA · 1932 WO; 1955 YH · A906 VG
- Minor planet category: main-belt · (inner); Flora · Augusta

Orbital characteristics
- Epoch 23 March 2018 (JD 2458200.5)
- Uncertainty parameter 0
- Observation arc: 111.28 yr (40,646 d)
- Aphelion: 2.6082 AU
- Perihelion: 1.7842 AU
- Semi-major axis: 2.1962 AU
- Eccentricity: 0.1876
- Orbital period (sidereal): 3.25 yr (1,189 d)
- Mean anomaly: 149.50°
- Mean motion: 0° 18^{m} 10.08^{s} / day
- Inclination: 3.6932°
- Longitude of ascending node: 221.75°
- Argument of perihelion: 94.490°

Physical characteristics
- Mean diameter: 10.920±0.057 km 11.910±0.270 km 13.03±0.28 km 14.64 km (derived)
- Synodic rotation period: >12 h >18 h >20 h 46.30±0.01 h
- Geometric albedo: 0.133; 0.171±0.008; 0.201±0.020; 0.2416±0.0245
- Spectral type: Tholen = S SMASS = S B–V = 0.880; U–B = 0.500
- Absolute magnitude (H): 11.82±0.20; 11.98

1058 Grubba, provisional designation 1925 MA, is a stony Flora asteroid from the inner regions of the asteroid belt. It was discovered on 22 June 1925, by Soviet–Russian astronomer Grigory Shajn at the Simeiz Observatory on the Crimean peninsula. The S-type asteroid was named for Irish telescope maker Howard Grubb. It has a longer-than average rotation period of 46.30 hours and measures approximately 12 kilometers (7.5 miles) in diameter.

== Orbit and classification ==
Grubba is a member of the Flora family (402), a giant asteroid family and the largest family of stony asteroids in the main-belt. It has also been grouped into the Augusta family by Vincenzo Zappalà in a previous study in the 1990s, also using the hierarchical clustering method. The Augusta family, named after 254 Augusta, can be considered a sub-family of the Flora-complex.

It orbits the Sun in the inner asteroid belt at a distance of 1.8–2.6 AU once every 3 years and 3 months (1,189 days; semi-major axis of 2.2 AU). Its orbit has an eccentricity of 0.19 and an inclination of 4° with respect to the ecliptic.

The asteroid was first observed as A906 VG at Heidelberg Observatory in November 1916. The body's observation arc begins with a precovery taken at the Yerkes Observatory in November 1932, or more than 7 years after its official discovery observation at Simeiz.

== Naming ==
This minor planet was named after Irish telescope maker Sir Howard Grubb (1844–1931), whose company Grubb Parson and Co., Newcastle upon Tyne, England, manufactured the 40-inch reflector of the discovering Simeiz Observatory. The official naming citation was mentioned in The Names of the Minor Planets by Paul Herget in 1955 (H 100).

== Physical characteristics ==
Grubba is a common, stony S-type asteroid in both the Tholen and SMASS classification, which also agrees with the overall spectral type for the Florian asteroids.

=== Rotation period ===
In August 2013, a rotational lightcurve of Grubba was obtained from photometric observations by Andrea Ferrero at the Bigmuskie Observatory (B88) in Italy. Lightcurve analysis gave a longer than average rotation period of 46.30 hours with a brightness variation of 0.24 magnitude (U=3). The result supersedes observations by French amateur astronomers Laurent Bernasconi (>12 hours) and René Roy (>20 hours), as well as by astronomers at the University of Arizona (18 hours) in Tucson, United States (U=n.a./2/n.a.). While not being a slow rotator, its period is significantly longer than that for most asteroids, which rotate every 2 to 20 hours once around their axis.

=== Diameter and albedo ===
According to the surveys carried out by the Japanese Akari satellite and the NEOWISE mission of NASA's Wide-field Infrared Survey Explorer, Grubba measures between 10.920 and 13.03 kilometers in diameter and its surface has an albedo between 0.171 and 0.2416. The Collaborative Asteroid Lightcurve Link adopts an albedo of 0.133, and derives a diameter of 14.64 kilometers based on an absolute magnitude of 11.98.
