= 67 Asia =

Main-belt asteroid

- 67 Asia

Discovery
- Discovered by: Norman Robert Pogson
- Discovery date: April 17, 1861

Designations
- Pronunciation: /ˈeɪʃiə/
- Named after: Asia and Asia
- Minor planet category: Main belt

Orbital characteristics
- Epoch December 31, 2006 (JD 2454100.5)
- Aphelion: 2.869 AU (429.2 Gm)
- Perihelion: 1.973 AU (295.2 Gm)
- Semi-major axis: 2.421 AU (362.2 Gm)
- Eccentricity: 0.185
- Orbital period (sidereal): 3.7674140999315 yr (1,376.048 d)
- Mean anomaly: 182.178°
- Inclination: 6.027°
- Longitude of ascending node: 202.722°
- Time of perihelion: 2023-Dec-10
- Argument of perihelion: 106.301°

Proper orbital elements
- Proper mean motion: 0.26133 deg / yr
- Proper orbital period: 1377.56859 yr (503156.928 d)

Physical characteristics
- Dimensions: 56.309±0.396 km
- Synodic rotation period: 15.89 hours
- Geometric albedo: 0.255
- Spectral type: S
- Absolute magnitude (H): 8.28

67 Asia is a large main belt asteroid. It was discovered by English astronomer N. R. Pogson on April 17, 1861, from the Madras Observatory. Pogson chose the name to refer both to Asia, a figure in Greek mythology, and to the continent of Asia, because the asteroid was the first to be discovered from that continent.

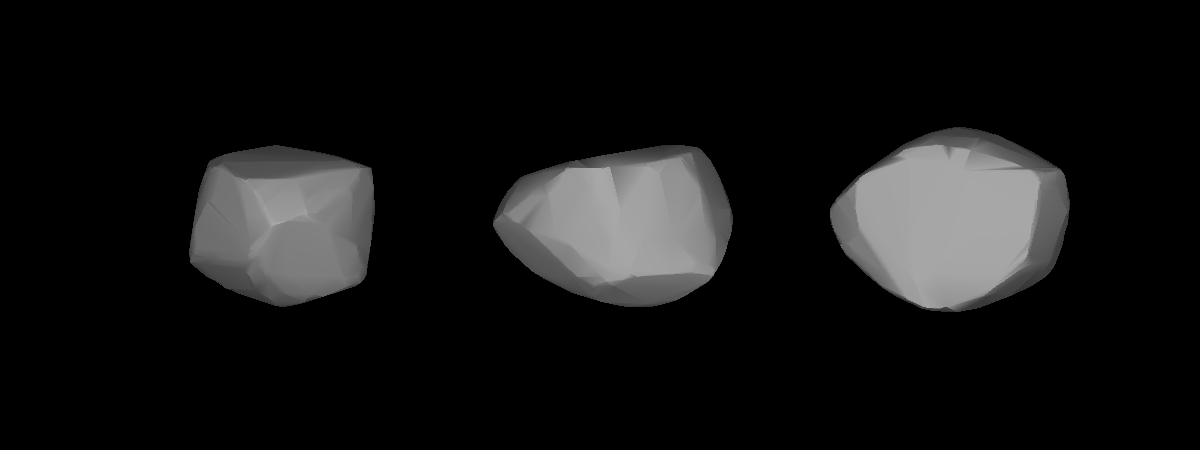
A lightcurve image of 67 Asia

This object is orbiting the Sun with a period of 3.77 years, a semimajor axis of 2.421 AU, and an eccentricity of 0.185. It has a 2:1 commensurability with Mars, having an orbital period double that of the planet. The orbital plane lies at an inclination of 6.0° to the plane of the ecliptic. This is a stony S-type asteroid with a cross-sectional size of 56 km, Photometry from the Oakley Observatory during 2006 produced a lightcurve that indicated a sidereal rotation period of 15.90±0.02 with an amplitude of 0.26±0.04 in magnitude.
