= Isis Pogson =

British astronomer and meteorologist (1852–1945)

Isis Pogson FRAS
- Born: Elizabeth Isis Pogson; 28 September 1852; Oxford, England
- Died: 14 May 1945 (aged 92); Croydon, London, England
- Other name: Elizabeth Isis Kent
- Known for: Astronomy

Elizabeth Isis Pogson FRAS (28 September 1852 – 14 May 1945), was a British astronomer and meteorologist who was one of the first women to be elected as a fellow of the Royal Astronomical Society.

== Early life ==
Elizabeth Isis Pogson was born in Oxford, England, on 28 September 1852, the eldest daughter of Norman Pogson by his first marriage to Elizabeth Jane Ambrose (died 1869). Pogson was one of the first women elected as a Fellow of the Royal Astronomical Society. Elizabeth Isis was probably named after the River Isis, the part of the River Thames that flows through Oxford.

== Assisting astronomer in India ==
Her father Norman Pogson was an assistant at Radcliffe Observatory and then at Hartwell Observatory. He discovered the asteroid 42 Isis on 23 May 1856, for which he was awarded the Lalande Prize. The asteroid was named by Professor Manuel John Johnson, director of the Radcliffe Observatory, presumably in honour of Pogson's daughter Isis; it could also have been a reference to the river Isis.

When her father became director of the Madras Observatory in Madras, India, in October 1860, Isis travelled with him, her mother and two of her 10 siblings to his new post. Her mother Elizabeth Pogson died in 1869, and her father relied upon Isis to look after the other children. She also worked as her father's assistant whilst they lived in India from 1873 to 1881. She was given the post of computer at the Madras Observatory in 1873 with the salary of 150 rupees, equivalent to a "cook or coach-man", and worked there for 25 years until she retired with a pension of 250 rupees in 1898, when the observatory closed. She served as the meteorological superintendent and reporter for the Madras government from 1881.

== Fellowship of the Royal Astronomical Society ==
Pogson was the first woman to attempt to be elected a fellow of the Royal Astronomical Society, being nominated (unsuccessfully) by her father and two other fellows in 1886. Although the society had elected a few women as honorary members, all the fellows had been male up to this time. Her nomination was withdrawn when two lawyers deemed female fellows illegal under the provisions of the society's royal charter dating from 1831, which referred to fellows only as he. Pogson (by then known by her married name Elizabeth Isis Kent) was successfully nominated in 1920 by Oxford professor H. H. Turner, five years after the Royal Astronomical Society first opened its doors to women.

== Personal ==
After retiring from astronomy, she married Herbert Clement Kent, a captain in the Merchant Navy, on 17 August 1902 in Red Hill, Queensland, Australia. The couple returned to England, living in Bournemouth and then London. Pogson died in Croydon on 14 May 1945.
