= Edmund Weiss =

Austrian astronomer

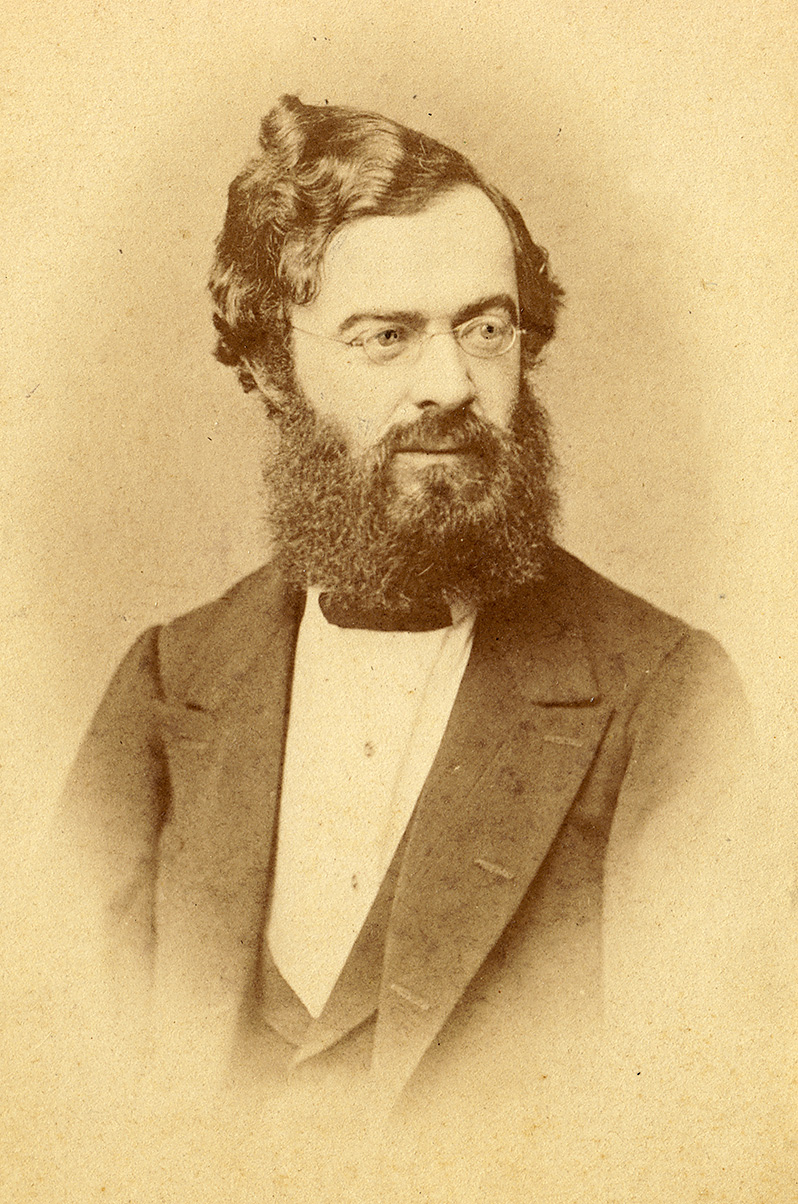
- Edmund Weiss in 1872
- Born: 26 August 1837; Frývaldov, Austrian Silesia, Austria-Hungary
- Died: 21 June 1917 (aged 79); Vienna, Austria
- Education: University of Vienna
- Scientific career
- Fields: Astronomy
- Workplaces: Vienna Observatory

Edmund Weiss (26 August 1837 – 21 June 1917) was an Austrian astronomer. He was born in Frývaldov, Austrian Silesia, now Jeseník, Czech Silesia. His father, Josef Weiss (1795–1847), was a pioneer of hydrotherapy. His twin brother, Adolf Gustav Weiss (1837–1894), became a botanist.

== Biography ==
In 1869 he became a professor at the University of Vienna. He was named the director of the Vienna Observatory in 1878. He also served as president of the Austrian österreichischen Gradmessungskommission, the degree measurement commission.

He published a number of comet observations and ephemeris' in the Astronomische Nachrichten between 1859 and 1909. In 1892 he published "Atlas der Sternenwelt", a pictorial atlas of astronomy in German.

Weiss died in Vienna on 21 June 1917. The lunar crater Weiss is named after him. Asteroid 229 Adelinda, discovered by Johann Palisa in 1882, was named after his wife, Adelinde Fenzel Weiss, with whom he had seven children. The asteroid's name was given by the Astronomische Gesellschaft during its meeting in Vienna in September 1883. Adelinde Weiss also named the asteroid 583 Klotilde after their daughter. Asteroids 265 Anna, 266 Aline and 722 Frieda were also named after members of his family.

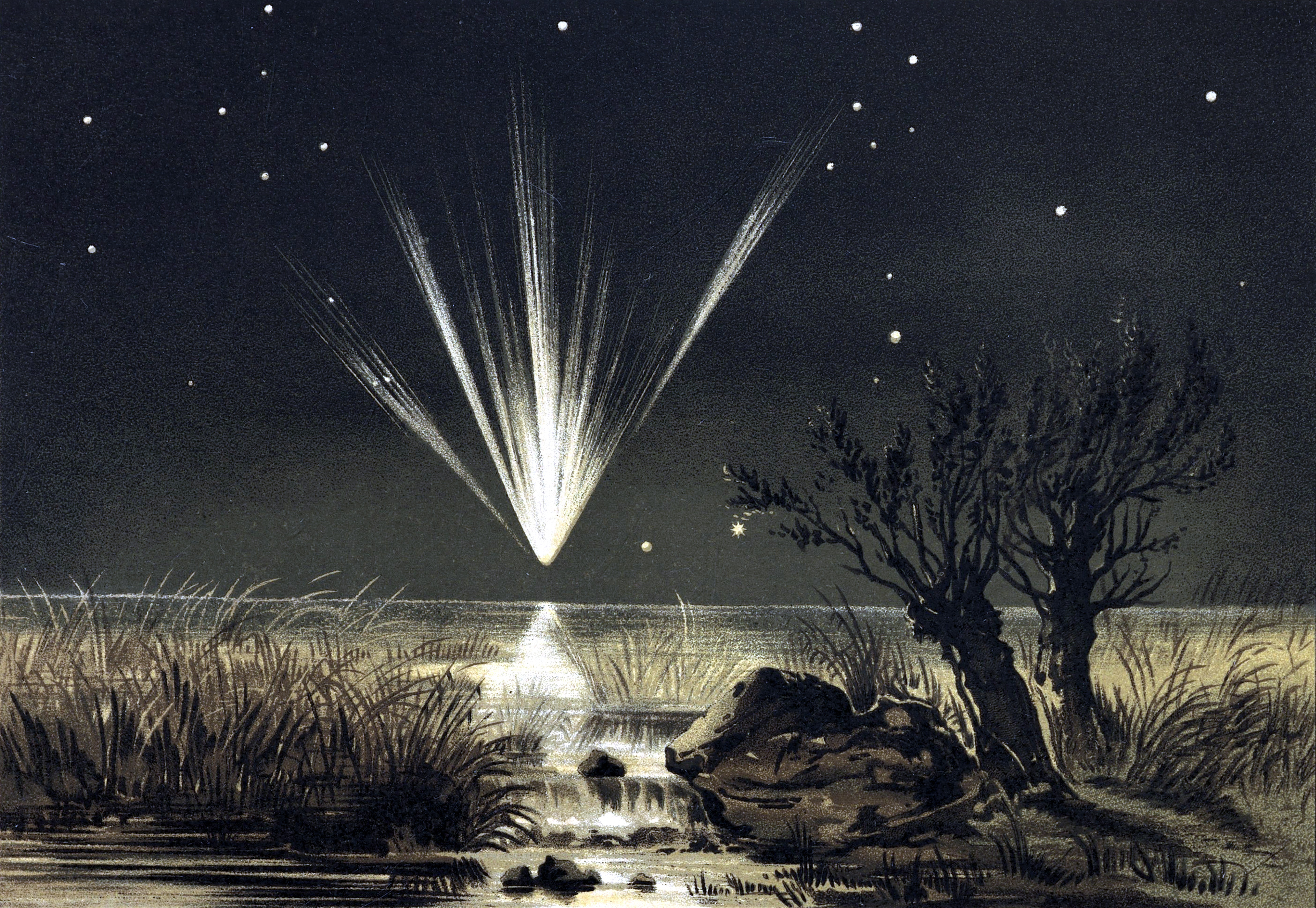
Weiss sketched the Great Comet of 1861
