= 42 Isis =

Main-belt asteroid

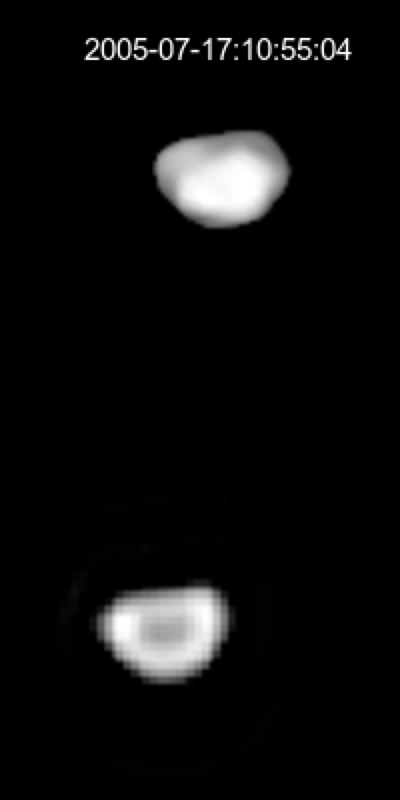
- A three-dimensional model of 42 Isis based on its light curve on the top and an image of 42 Isis on the bottom.

Discovery
- Discovered by: Norman Robert Pogson
- Discovery date: 23 May 1856

Designations
- Pronunciation: /ˈaɪsɪs/
- Named after: Isis Pogson
- Minor planet category: Main belt
- Adjectives: Isidian /aɪˈsɪdiən/

Orbital characteristics
- Epoch 31 December 2006 (JD 2454100.5)
- Aphelion: 446.706 million km (2.986 AU)
- Perihelion: 283.890 million km (1.898 AU)
- Semi-major axis: 365.298 million km (2.442 AU)
- Eccentricity: 0.223
- Orbital period (sidereal): 1393.737 d (3.82 a)
- Mean anomaly: 121.874°
- Inclination: 8.530°
- Longitude of ascending node: 84.398°
- Time of perihelion: 2024-Oct-17
- Argument of perihelion: 236.626°

Physical characteristics
- Mean diameter: 102±4 km
- Mass: (1.58±0.52)×10^{18} kg (composite estimate) (1.47±0.16)×10^{18} kg (Note: Calculated from its standard gravitational parameter GM = 0.098±0.011 km^{3}/s^{2}.)
- Mean density: 2.8±1.0 g/cm^{3} 2.64±0.43 g/cm^{3}
- Synodic rotation period: 13.58364 h
- Pole ecliptic longitude: 108° ± 1°
- Pole ecliptic latitude: 47° ± 3°
- Geometric albedo: 0.171 (geometric)
- Spectral type: S
- Apparent magnitude: 9.18 to 13.50
- Absolute magnitude (H): 7.53

42 Isis is a large main-belt asteroid, measuring 100.2 km in diameter with a stony (S-type) composition. It was discovered by English astronomer N.R. Pogson on 23 May 1856 at Oxford, and was his first asteroid discovery. The asteroid's name was chosen by Manuel John Johnson, director of the Radcliffe Observatory in Oxford. Although Isis is the name of an Egyptian goddess, the name was chosen in homage to Pogson's astronomer daughter, (Elizabeth) Isis Pogson. In addition, the Isis is the stretch of the River Thames that runs through Oxford.

This asteroid is orbiting the Sun with a period of 3.82 years. The light curve inversion technique, when applied to photometric observations of this asteroid, show multiple local irregularities. The overall shape displays little elongation, with a ratio between the major and minor axes equal to 1.1. The measured rotation period for this model is 13.6 hours. The spectrum of 42 Isis reveals the strong presence of the mineral olivine, a relative rarity in the asteroid belt.
