= Littrow prism =

Retro-reflecting dispersing prism

In optics, a Littrow prism, or Littrow mirror, originally part of a Littrow spectrograph (after Otto von Littrow), is a retro-reflecting, dispersing prism arranged in such a way that an incident light beam which enters at the Brewster angle undergoes minimal deviation and hence maximum dispersion.

== Description ==
Littrow (optical) prisms typically have the shape of a (geometric) prism with a 30°/60°/90° right triangular base, equivalent to half an equilateral triangle. Typically, they are coated with a reflective film coating on the surface opposite the 60° angle. This design was devised by Otto von Littrow (1843–1864).

== Applications ==
Typically Littrow prisms are used in lasers at the end of an optical cavity to offer fine adjustment of the laser's output frequency by altering the angle of incidence.

Before the ready availability of diffraction gratings Littrow prisms were used widely in spectroscopy. They are still used in some UV instruments and in one section of some specialized double monochromators.
