= Littrow projection =

Retroazimuthal conformal map projection

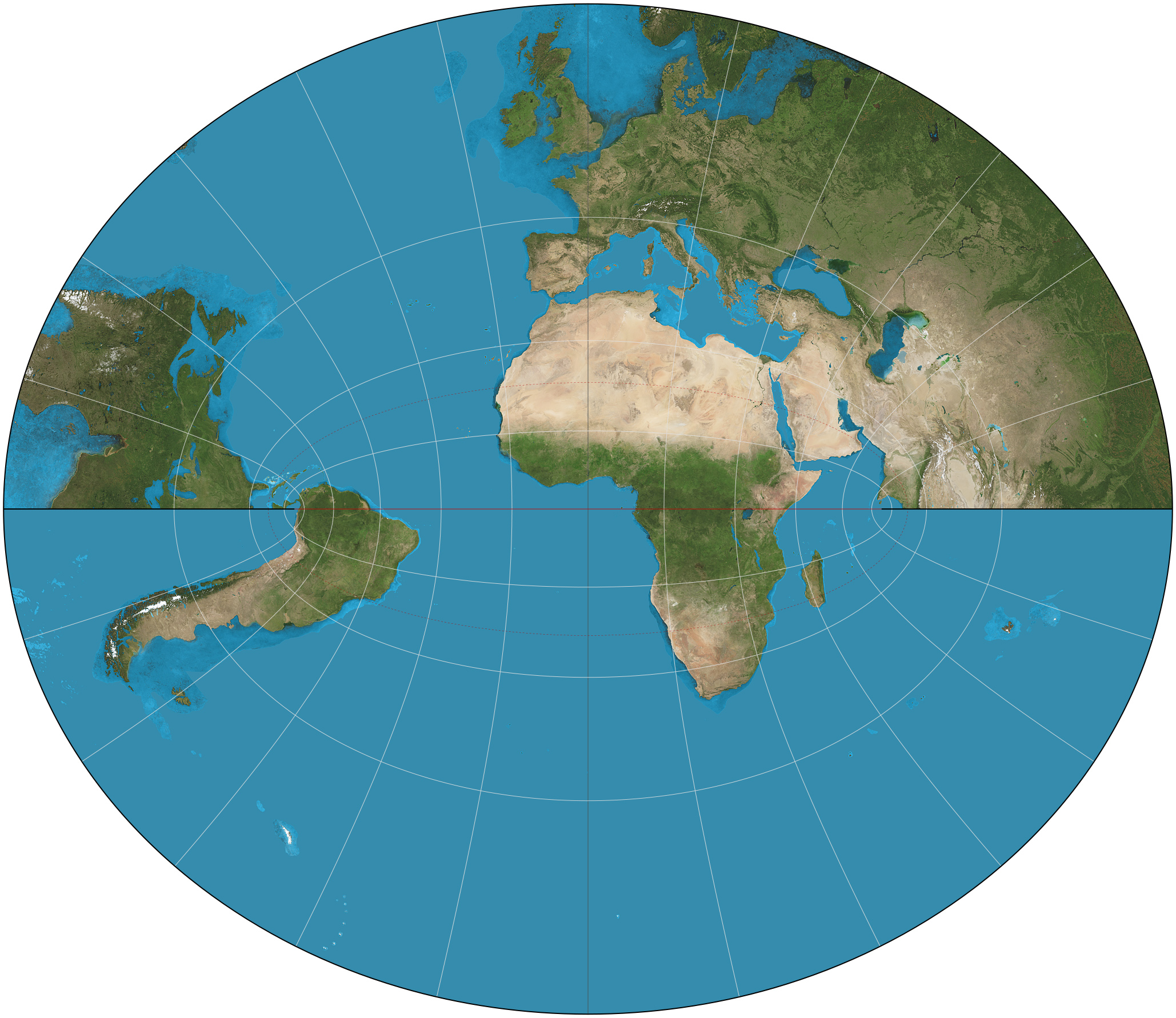
Littrow projection of partial hemisphere

The Littrow projection is a map projection developed by Joseph Johann von Littrow in 1833. It is the only conformal, retroazimuthal map projection. As a retroazimuthal projection, the Littrow shows directions, or azimuths, correctly from any point to the center of the map.

Patrick Weir of the British Merchant Navy independently reinvented the projection in 1890, after which it began to see more frequent use as recognition of its retroazimuthal property spread. Maps based on the Littrow projection are sometimes referred to as Weir Azimuth diagrams.

The projection transforms from latitude φ and longitude λ to map coordinates x and y via the following equations:
$$\begin{align} x &= R \frac {\sin \left(\lambda - \lambda_0\right)}{\cos \varphi} \\
y &= R \cos \left(\lambda - \lambda_0\right) \tan \varphi \end{align}$$
where R is the radius of the globe to be projected and λ_{0} is the longitude desired for the center point.

== See also ==
- List of map projections
