= Littrow expansion =

Littrow expansion and its counterpart Littrow compression are optical effects associated with slitless imaging spectrographs. These effects are named after Austrian physicist Otto von Littrow.

In a slitless imaging spectrograph, light is focused with a conventional optical system, which includes a transmission or reflection grating as in a conventional spectrograph. This disperses the light, according to wavelength, in one direction; but no slit is interposed into the beam. For pointlike objects (such as distant stars) this results in a spectrum on the focal plane of the instrument for each imaged object. For distributed objects with emission-line spectra (such as the Sun in extreme ultraviolet), it results in an image of the object at each wavelength of interest, overlapping on the focal plane, as in a spectroheliograph.

== Description ==
The Littrow expansion/compression effect is an anamorphic distortion of single-wavelength image on the focal plane of the instrument, due to a geometric effect surrounding reflection or transmission at the grating. In particular, the angle of incidence $\theta_i$ and reflection $\theta_r$ from a flat mirror, measured from the direction normal to the mirror, have the relation

$$\theta_r = -\theta_i,$$

which implies

$$\frac{d\theta_r}{d\theta_i} = -1,$$

so that an image encoded in the angle of collimated light is reversed but not distorted by the reflection.

In a spectrograph, the angle of reflection in the dispersed direction depends in a more complicated way on the angle of incidence:

$$\theta_r = -\arcsin\big( \sin(\theta_i) + n \lambda / D \big),$$

where $n$ is an integer and represents spectral order, $\lambda$ is the wavelength of interest, and $D$ is the line spacing of the grating. Because the sine function (and its inverse) are nonlinear, this in general means that

$$\frac{d\theta_r}{d\theta_i} \ne -1$$

for most values of $n$ and $\lambda/D$, yielding anamorphic distortion of the spectral image at each wavelength. When the magnitude is larger, images are expanded in the spectral direction; when the magnitude is smaller, they are compressed.

For the special case where

$$n \lambda / D = - 2 \sin(\theta_i),$$

the reflected ray exits the grating exactly back along the incident ray, and $d\theta_r/d\theta_i = 1$; this is the Littrow configuration, and the specific angle for which this configuration holds is the Littrow angle. This configuration preserves the image aspect ratio in the reflected beam. All other incidence angles yield either Littrow expansion or Littrow compression of the collimated image.
