= N. R. Pogson =

English astronomer (1829–1891)

Norman Robert Pogson
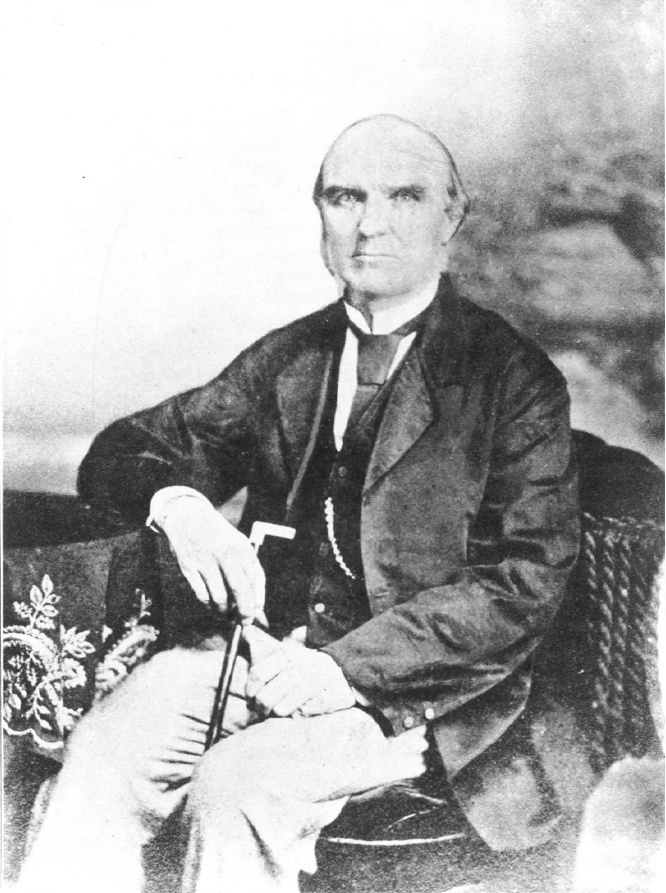
- Born: 23 March 1829; Nottingham, England
- Died: 23 June 1891 (aged 62); Chennai, India
- Awards: Lalande Prize (1856)
- Scientific career
- Fields: Astronomy

Norman Robert Pogson, CIE (23 March 1829 – 23 June 1891) was an English astronomer who worked in India at the Madras observatory. He discovered several minor planets and made observations on comets. He introduced a mathematical scale of stellar magnitudes with the ratio of two successive magnitudes being the fifth root of one hundred (~2.512) and referred to as Pogson's ratio.

== Youth and education ==
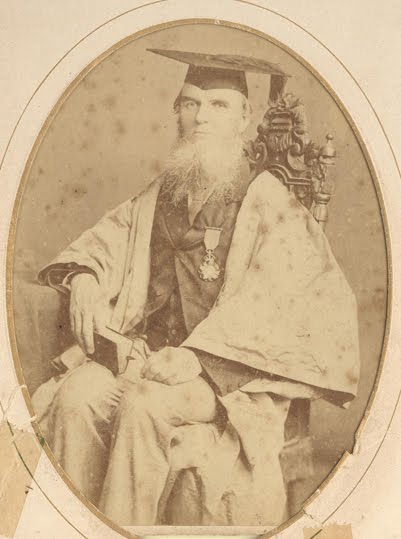
Pogson in academic gown

Norman was born in Nottingham, the son of George Owen Pogson, a hosiery manufacturer, lace dealer and commission agent, "with enough income to support an extended family", and his wife, Mary Ann. It was intended that he should follow his father into business, and he was accordingly sent for "commercial education", but he was fascinated by science, and his mother supported and encouraged this interest. His early education was largely informal. He left school at 16, intending to teach mathematics. He was introduced to astronomy through George Bishop's Observatory at South Villa Regent's Park from 1846. At the age of eighteen, he calculated with the help of John Russell Hind of the Royal Astronomical Society, the orbits of two comets. He took an interest in comets and studied Iris, a minor planet that had been recently discovered. He was engaged as an assistant at the Radcliffe Observatory in 1852; a new heliometer had been installed there in 1850.

== Professional career ==
Asteroids discovered: 8
42 Isis	23 May 1856
43 Ariadne	15 April 1857
46 Hestia	16 August 1857
67 Asia	17 April 1861
80 Sappho	2 May 1864
87 Sylvia	16 May 1866
107 Camilla	17 November 1868
245 Vera	6 February 1885

After working as an assistant at the South Villa Observatory in 1851, he moved to the Radcliffe Observatory in Oxford in 1852. He received the Lalande Medal upon his discovery in 1856 of the minor planet Isis. His Oxford period was spent studying variable stars and other routine research. In 1854 he helped Sir George Airy conduct an experiment to determine the density of the earth. Pogson was appointed as director at the Hartwell Observatory belonging to John Lee in 1859. He published around fourteen papers from 1859 to 1860 in the Monthly Notices of the Royal Astronomical Society, mostly on variable stars and on minor planets. Sir Charles Wood appointed him as government astronomer for Madras in October 1860.

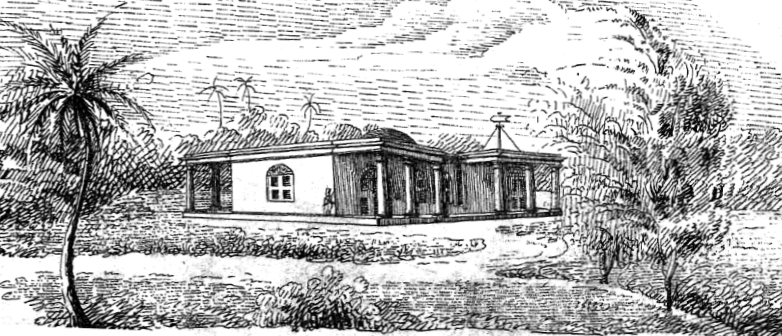
The Madras Observatory c. 1838

Reaching India in 1861 and working at the Madras Observatory he worked tirelessly, discovering the asteroid 67 Asia. In the next seven years he found five minor planets and seven variable stars. He continued worked on Taylor's Madras Catalogue ("Taylor's General Catalogue of Stars from observations made at the Madras Observatory during the years 1831-1842") of 11,015 stars which had been published in 1835 based on work begun in 1831 by Thomas Glanville Taylor. Pogson continued work on this to add 51,101 observations (until 1887) and after his death in 1891 the catalogue was revised by Arthur Downing and published in 1901. Despite Pogson's isolation he had at the time of his death discovered 134 stars, 106 variable stars, 21 possible variable stars and 7 possible supernovae. Pogson also made special expeditions, observing a total solar eclipse on 18 August 1868 at Masulipatnam and making spectrometric studies. He observed and commented on the spectral line associated with helium, then yet to be discovered.

His most important contribution was to note that in the stellar magnitude system introduced by the Greek astronomer Hipparchus, stars of the first magnitude were a hundred times as bright as stars of the sixth magnitude. Pogson's suggestion in 1856 was to make this a standard; thus, a first magnitude star is 100^{1/5} or about 2.512 times as bright as a second magnitude star. This fifth root of 100 is known as Pogson's Ratio.

The magnitude relation is given as follows:

m_{1} - m_{2} = -2.5 log_{10} (L_{1} / L_{2})

where m is the stellar magnitude and L is the luminosity, for stars 1 and 2.

In 1868 and 1871, Pogson joined the Indian solar eclipse expeditions. He received a telegram from Ernst Friedrich Wilhelm Klinkerfues on 30 November 1872 which read Biela touched Earth on 27th. search near Theta Centauri, a message so esoteric that it caught the fancy of the newspapers of the time. Unfortunately the skies were cloudy in Madras and when it cleared up on 2 December 1872, he observed an object (recorded as X/1872 X1) which he believed to be a return of Biela's Comet but was later found to be a different object which has been called "Pogson's comet".

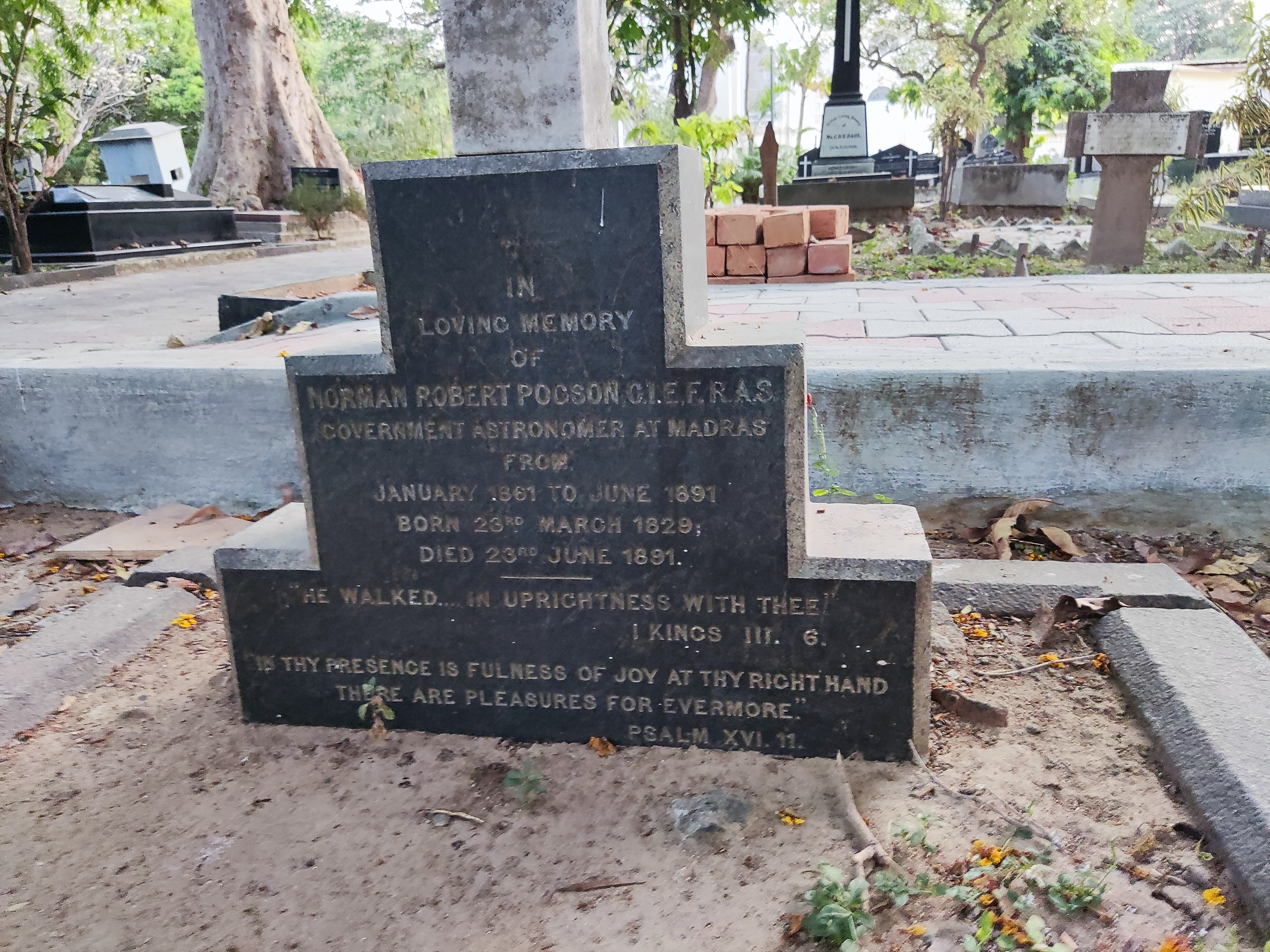
Pogson's grave

One of Pogson's assistants was Chintamani Raghunatha Chary. He worked for many years with Pogson and his retirement in 1878 was a blow to Pogson. Pogson also got into increasing difficulties with his collaborators in England as well as the bureaucracy in India. George Airy, who had admired Pogson once became increasingly unsupportive and downright dismissive of Pogson's applications for help from the government as well as to help him return to England. Pogson on his part had been stubborn in not supporting a southern-sky survey.

Pogson served for 30 years at Madras, taking no leave during the period. His health declined and he died in June 1891. He is buried at St. George's Cathedral, Chennai.

== Family life ==
Pogson was married in London in 1849 to Elizabeth Jane Ambrose, by whom he had 11 children. She died on 5 November 1869. On 25 October 1883 he married Edith Louisa Stopford Sibley in Madras, daughter of Charles W. Sibley of the 64th regiment and a widow, aged 33, by whom he had a further three children: Frederick Vere (born in 1885), Edith Vera (born in 1886; died in infancy) and Edith Gladys, born in 1889. The asteroid Vera, discovered by Pogson on 6 February 1885, was named at the suggestion of his second wife, Edith Pogson.. Edith outlived him and retired to Wimbledon where she died on 31 December 1946.

Pogson's daughter Elizabeth Isis Pogson (born on 28 September 1852) served as his assistant at the Madras observatory from 1873 to 1881. She went on to become a meteorological reporter for Madras. First proposed for a fellowship of the Royal Astronomical Society in 1886, she was finally admitted in 1920.

== Honours ==
Pogson was created a Companion of the Most Eminent Order of the Indian Empire in January 1878.

The following celestial features are named after him:

- Asteroid 1830 Pogson
- The lunar crater Pogson
- Asteroid 42 Isis is believed to be named after his daughter, Elizabeth Isis Pogson
