= Joseph Johann von Littrow =

Austrian astronomer (1781–1840)

Joseph von Littrow
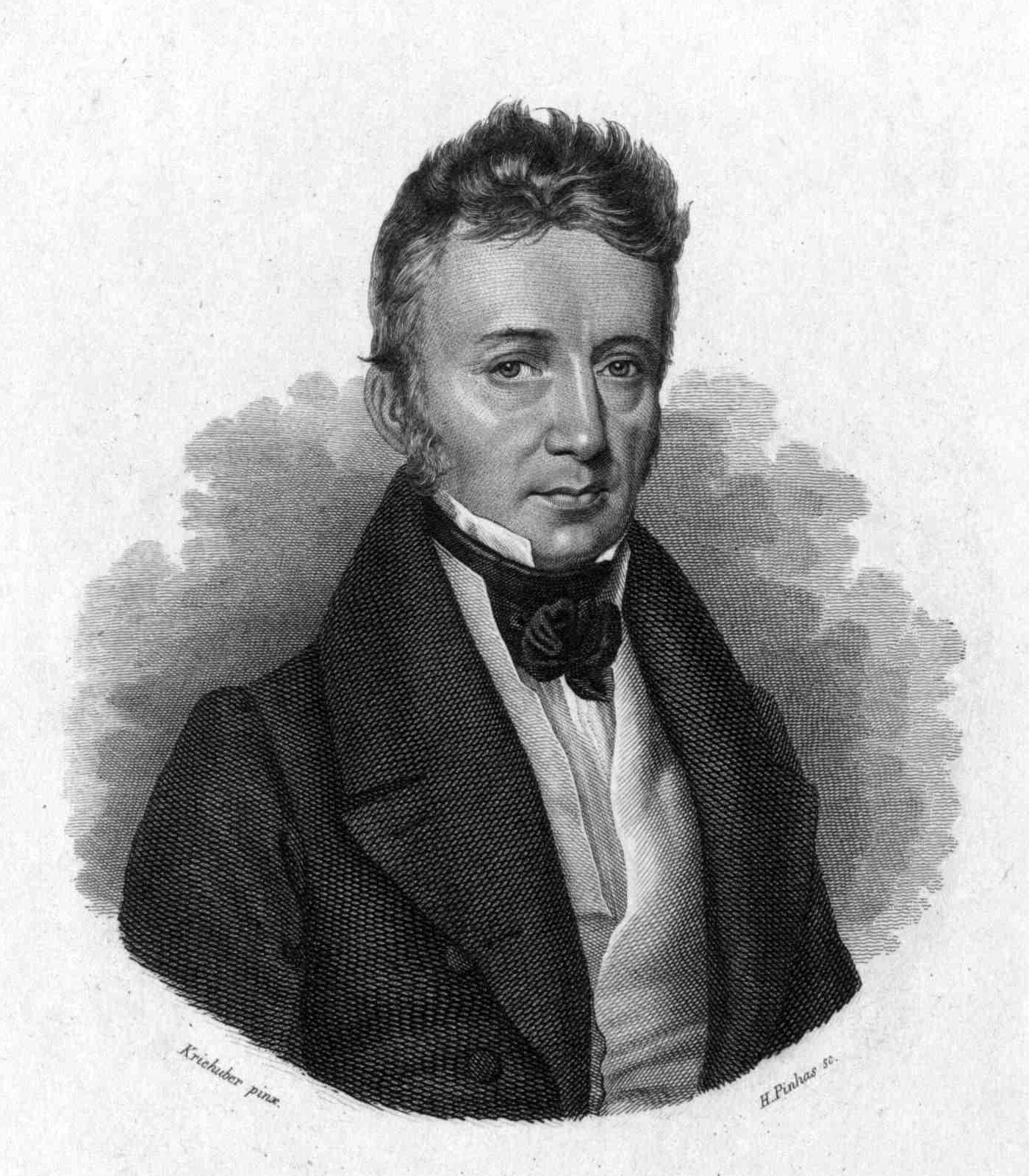
- Portrait of Joseph Johann von Littrow (1781–1840) from his 1836 book Physische Astronomie (Physical Astronomy).
- Born: 13 March 1781; Horšovský Týn, Bohemia
- Died: 30 November 1840 (aged 59); Vienna, Austria
- Education: Charles University
- Known for: Littrow projection
- Scientific career
- Fields: Astronomer
- Workplaces: Krakau University; Kazan University; Vienna Observatory; Buda Observatory; University of Vienna
- Doctoral students: Nikolai Brashman; Ivan Simonov

Notes
- Note that he was the father of Karl Ludwig von Littrow and Heinrich von Littrow. He was the father-in-law of Auguste von Littrow.

Joseph Johann von Littrow (13 March 1781, Horšovský Týn (German: Bischofteinitz) – 30 November 1840, Vienna) was an Austrian astronomer. In 1837, he was ennobled with the title Joseph Johann Edler von Littrow. He was the father of Karl Ludwig Edler von Littrow.

He became director of the Vienna Observatory in 1819. He served in this position until his death in 1840. He created the only conformal retroazimuthal map projection, which is known as the Littrow projection. Littrow authored the widely read Wunder des Himmels ("Miracles of the Sky"), which was reprinted eight times by 1897.

In 1810, his work took him to Russia for six years. He taught at the Kazan University and established Europe's easternmost astronomical observatory there (now a World Heritage Site). It was in Russia that his son who succeeded him was born. Von Littrow also mentored the mathematician Nikolai Brashman, suggesting he should continue his career in Russia.

Von Littrow is often associated with a proposal to dig a large circular canal in the Sahara desert and fill it with burning kerosene, thus communicating the fact of human intelligence to aliens who may be observing Earth. However, Von Littrow's connection with this scheme may be apocryphal.

The crater Littrow on the Moon is named in his honor.

He is the great-great-great-grandfather of Roman Catholic Cardinal Christoph Schönborn.

== Timeline ==
- 1799 Entered Charles University
- 1802 Graduated in jurisprudence and theology
- 1803 Became the private tutor of count J. Renard in Silesia
- 1807 Appointed professor of astronomy Krakau University
- 1810 Established the observatory at Kazan University
- 1816 Became co-director of the observatory at Ofen (Buda)
- 1819 Appointed professor of astronomy at the University of Vienna and became director of the first university observatory Vienna, which he reorganized completely
