= Auguste von Littrow =

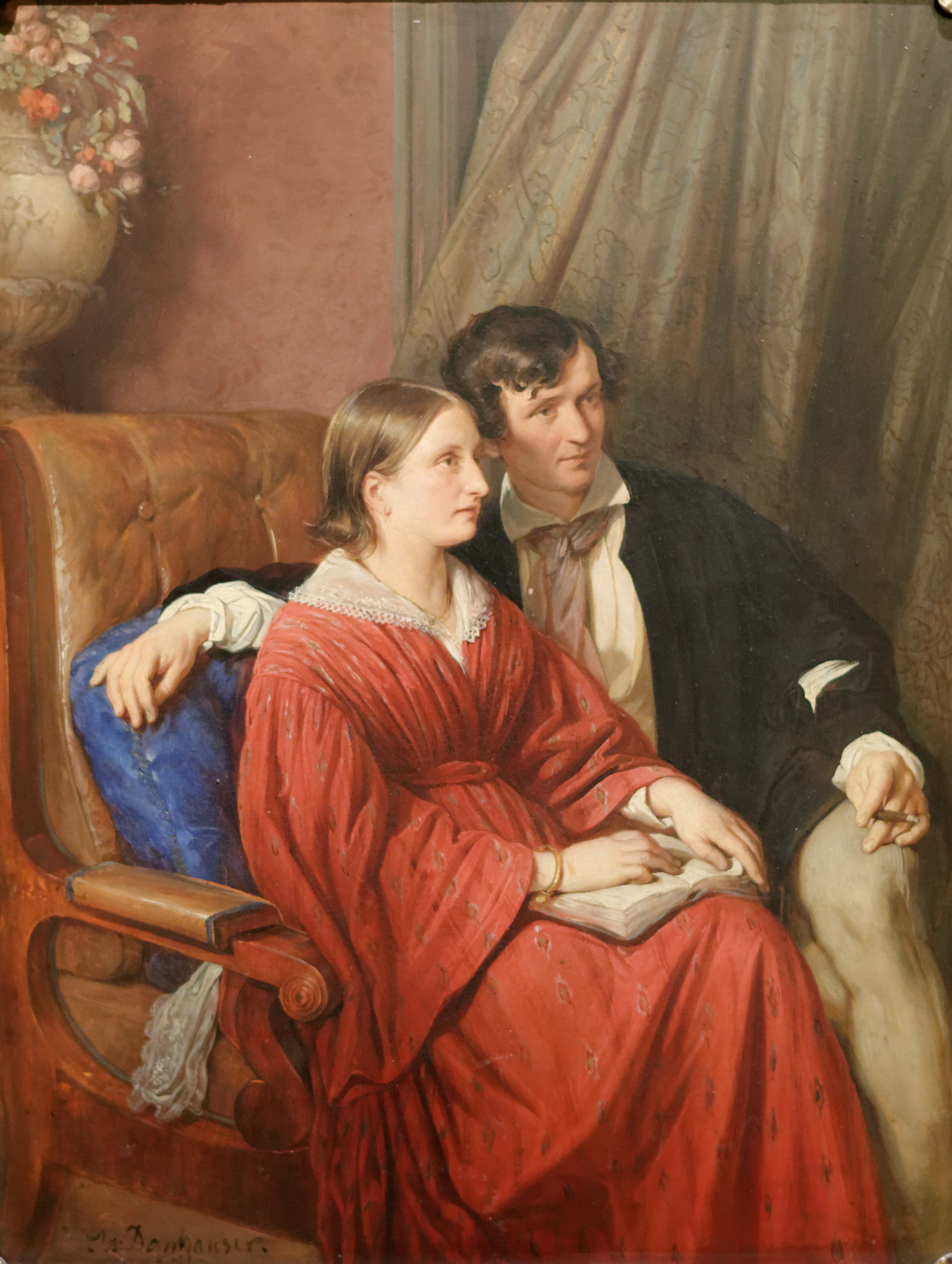
Auguste von Littrow with her husband Karl Ludwig; painting by Josef Danhauser

Auguste von Littrow, née Bischoff von Altenstern (13 February 1819 in Prague – 23 March 1890 in Vienna) was a German-Austrian author and women's movement leader.

She was the daughter of the physician Professor Ignaz von Bischoff-Altenstern. Shortly after her 20th birthday, in 1839, she married astronomer Karl Ludwig von Littrow and settled in Vienna. Rapidly the Littrow household developed into a meeting place of Viennese society. There Hermann Bonitz, Josef Danhauser, Marie von Ebner-Eschenbach, August Eisenmenger, Ernst von Feuchtersleben, Ottilie von Goethe, Franz Grillparzer, Friedrich Hebbel, Rudolf von Jhering, Joseph Lewinsky, Franz Miklosich all met.

Asteroid 254 Augusta is named in her honour.

She is the great-great grandmother of Roman Catholic Cardinal Christoph Schönborn.

== Bibliography ==
- Aus dem persönlichen Verkehren mit Franz Grillparzer. Rosner Verlag, Wien, 1873.
- Die Krankenpflege durch Frauen mit Rücksicht auf die gegenwärtigen Verhältnisse. Verlag Czermak, Wien, 1872.
- Die sociale Bewegung auf dem Gebiete der Frauen. Hoffmann & Campe, Hamburg, 1868.
