= Karl Ludwig Littrow =

Austrian astronomer

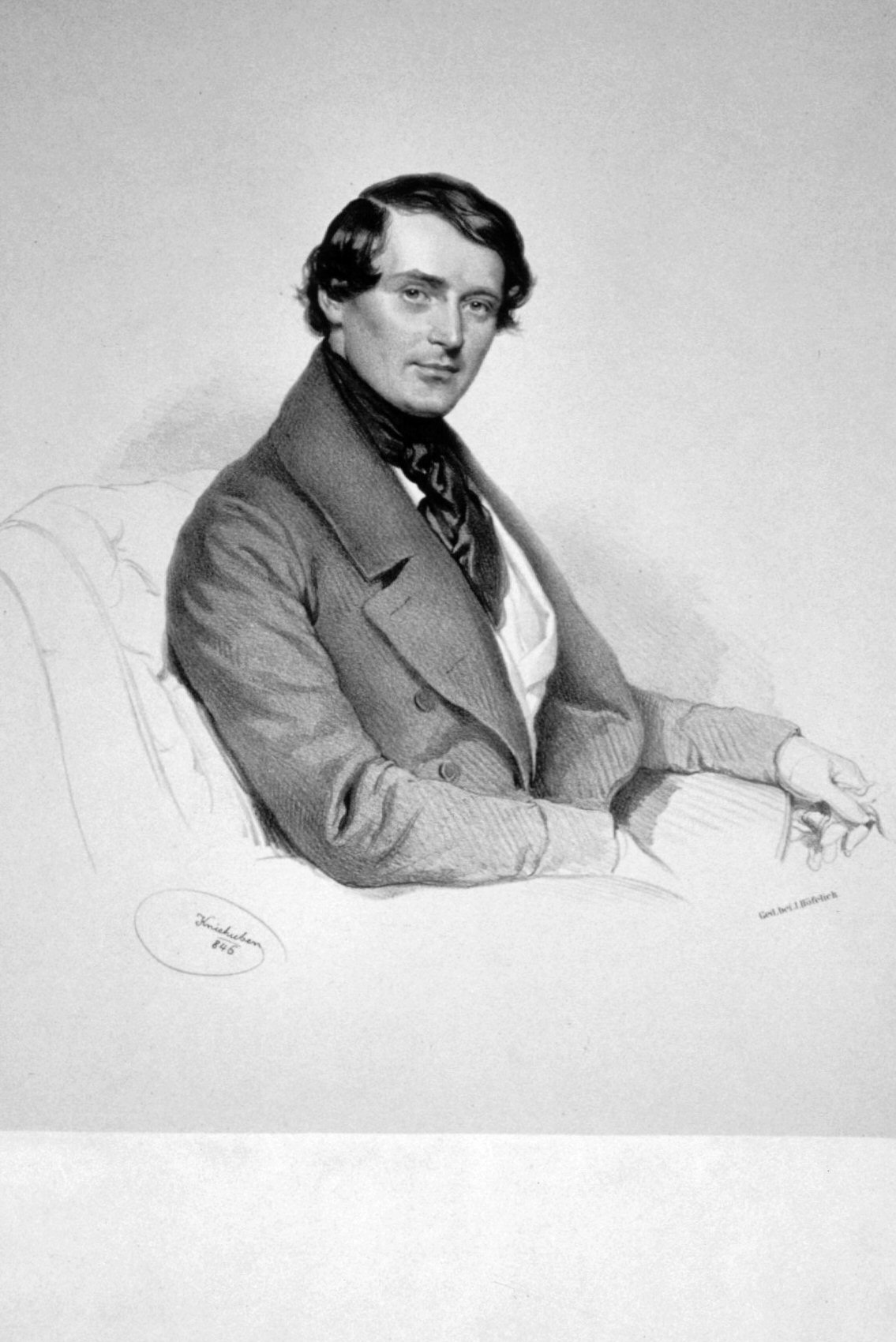
Karl Ludwig Littrow, 1846

Karl Ludwig Edler von Littrow (18 July 1811 – 16 November 1877) was an Austrian astronomer.

Born in Kazan, Russian Empire, he was the son of astronomer Joseph Johann Littrow. He studied mathematics and astronomy at the universities of Vienna and Berlin, receiving his doctorate at the University of Krakow in 1832. In 1842 he succeeded his father as director of the Vienna Observatory. Under his leadership, construction of a new observatory began in Währing in 1872; he died, however, prior to its completion. He was the husband of Auguste von Littrow and the father of Otto von Littrow.

He died in Venice, Italy.

He is the great-great-grandfather of Roman Catholic Cardinal Christoph Schönborn.

== Publications ==
- Beitrag zu einer Monographie des Halleyschen Cometen, (1834) – Monograph on Halley's Comet.
- Verzeichnis geographischer Ortsbestimmungen, (1844) – Directory of geographical localizations.
- Die Wunder des Himmels : gemeinverständliche Darstellung des astronomischen Weltbildes, (1854) – The wonders of the heavens; a common understanding of the astronomical world image.
- Physische Zusammenkünfte der Planeten, (1859).

He made contributions to a new edition of Johann Samuel Traugott Gehler's Physikalisches wörterbunch.
