= Vienna Observatory =

Observatory in Austria

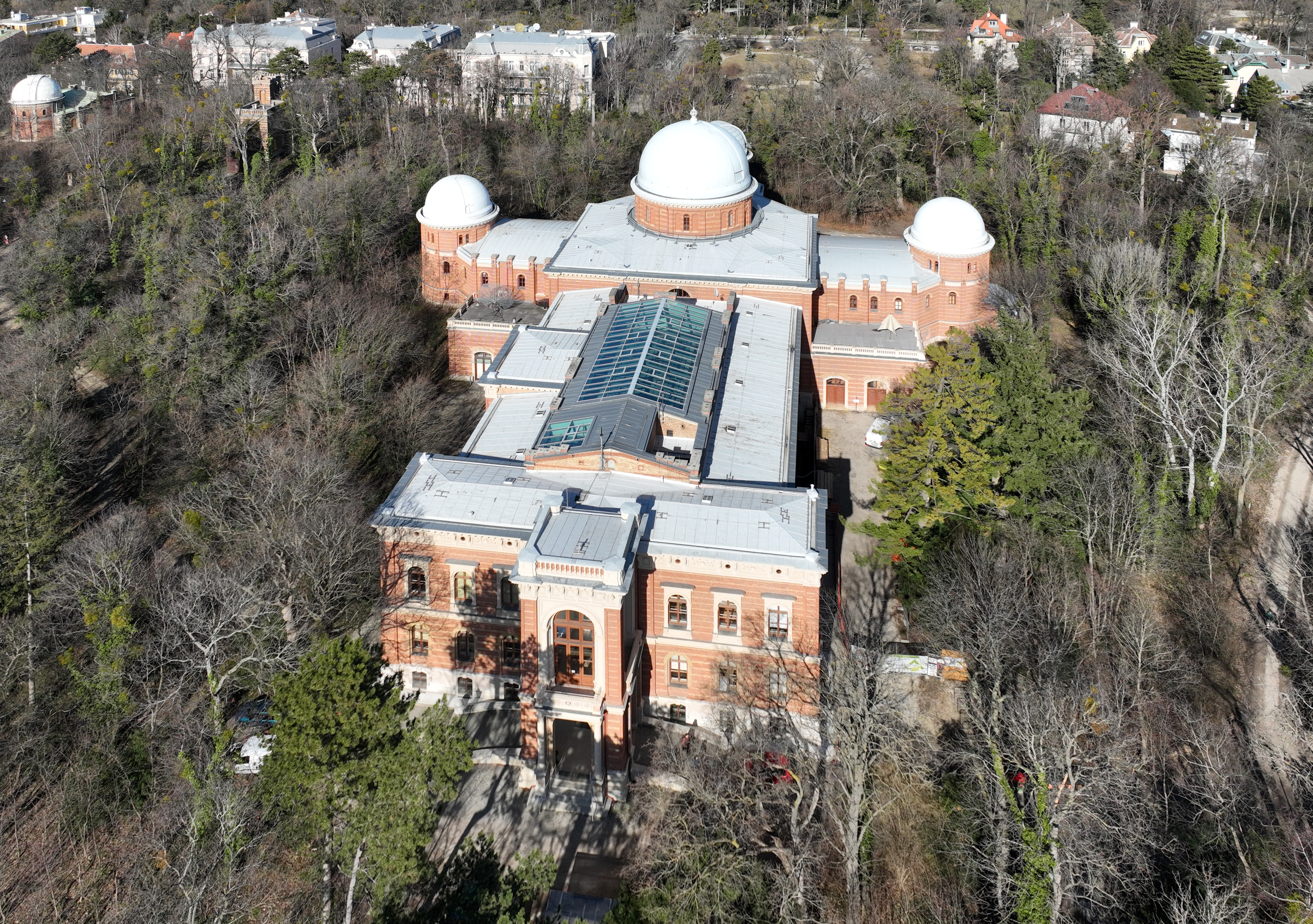
- Vienna University Observatory
- Observatory code: 045
- Location: Vienna, Austria
- Coordinates: 48°13′55″N 16°20′03″E
- Website: astro.univie.ac.at/en/home/
- Telescopes: The Big Refractor
- Related media on Commons

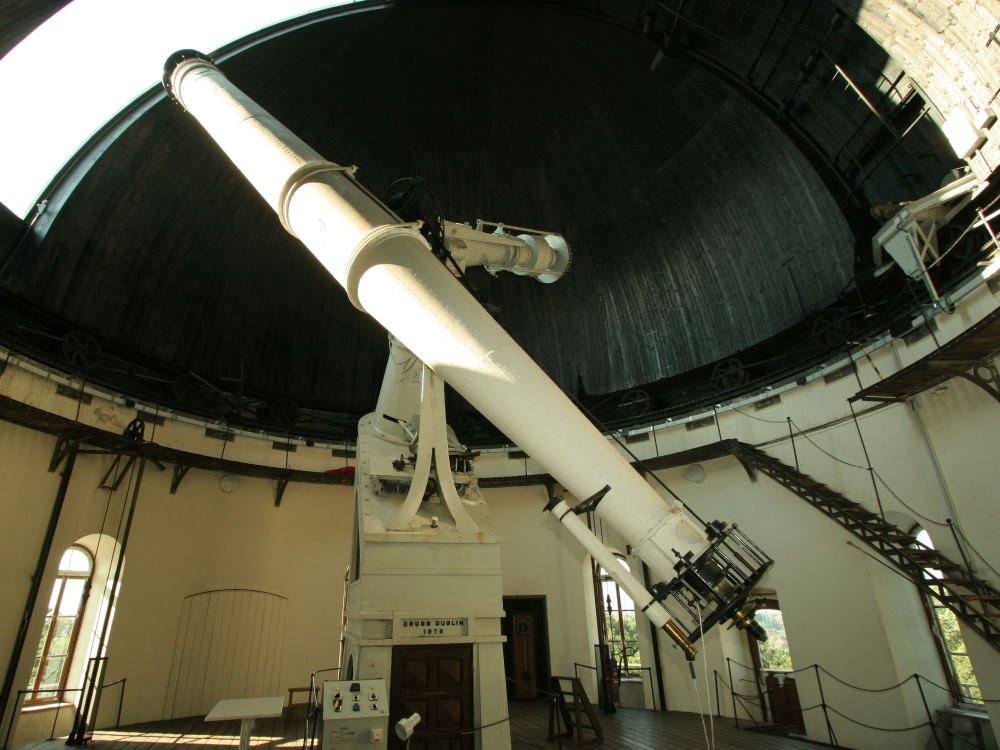
The observatory's 68 cm Grubb refractor

The Vienna Observatory (German: Universitätssternwarte Wien) is an astronomical observatory in Vienna, Austria. It is part of the University of Vienna.

== History ==
The first observatory was built in 1753–1754 on the roof of one of the university buildings.

A new observatory was built between 1874 and 1879, and was finally inaugurated by Emperor Franz Joseph I of Austria in 1883. The main dome houses a refractor with a diameter of 68 centimetres (27 in) and a focal length of 10.5 metres (34 ft) built by the Grubb Telescope Company. At that time, it was the world's largest refracting telescope.

Land for the new observatory was purchased in 1872, and was noted for having increased elevations (about 150 ft) above the city. Construction started in March 1874, and it was opened with new instruments in 1877. The overall design had various rooms and three main domes, one for the Grubb refractor and then two smaller domes, and some terraces.

At this time there were larger aperture reflecting telescopes, and the main technologies of metal mirror and silver on glass; however they had not yet established a strong reputation for themselves and there continued a strong interest in refractors for better or worse until the 20th century.

A report published in the publication Nature in notes that the 69 cm / 27-inch Grubb observed planets, comets, and nebulae between 1903 and 1906. Observations with a 6-inch Fraunhofer refracting telescope of comets and planets between 1903 and 1910 were also noted.

== Directors ==
- 1756–1792 · Maximilian Hell
- 1792–1817 · Franz de Paula Triesnecker
- 1819–1840 · Johann Josef von Littrow
- 1842–1877 · Karl Ludwig von Littrow
- 1877–1908 · Edmund Weiss
- 1928–1938 · Kasimir Graff
- 1940–1945 · Bruno Thüring
- 1945–1949 · Kasimir Graff
- 1951–1962 · Josef Hopmann
- 1962–1979 · Josef Meurers
- 1979–1981 · Karl Rakos
- 1981–1984 · Werner Tscharnuter
- 1984–1986 · Michel Breger
- 1986–1994 · Paul Jackson
- 1994–2005 · Michel Breger
- 2006–2009 · Gerhard Hensler
- 2009–2011 · Franz Kerschbaum
- 2011–2012 · Manuel Güdel
- 2012–2013 · João Alves
- 2013–2018 · Bodo Ziegler
- 2018–2022 · Manuel Güdel
- 2022–2026 · Glenn van de Ven
- 2026-pres. · João Alves

== See also ==
- List of largest optical refracting telescopes
- Kuffner Observatory (Established in the 1886, also in Vienna)
- List of Jesuit sites
