= List of minor planets named after places =

This is a list of minor planets named after places, organized by continent.

== Africa ==
- 1193 Africa (Africa)
- 1368 Numidia (Numidia)
- 1817 Katanga (Katanga Province)

=== Countries ===
- 1268 Libya (Libya)
- 1279 Uganda (Uganda)
- 1349 Bechuana (Botswana)
- 1430 Somalia (Somalia)
- 1432 Ethiopia (Ethiopia)
- 1638 Ruanda (Rwanda)
- 1718 Namibia (Namibia)
- 1816 Liberia (Liberia)

=== Cities ===
- 1326 Losaka (Lusaka, Zambia)
- 1468 Zomba (Zomba, Malawi)
- 1634 Ndola (Ndola, Zambia)
- 1948 Kampala (Kampala, Uganda)
- 6362 Tunis (Tunis, Tunisia)

=== Natural features ===
- 1242 Zambesia (Zambezi River)
- 1701 Okavango (Okavango River)
- 1702 Kalahari (Kalahari Desert)
- 26871 Tanezrouft (Tanezrouft Basin)
- 35295 Omo (Omo River)
- 69228 Kamerunberg (Mount Cameroon (Kamerunberg), Cameroon)
- 134369 Sahara (Sahara, the third largest desert in the world)
- 192182 Ennedi (Ennedi Plateau, Chad)

=== Buildings and man-made structures ===
- 40201 Besely (Besely Observatory, Madagascar)
- 82346 Hakos (Hakos, a farm in Namibia)

=== Algeria ===
- 426 Hippo (Hippo Regius)
- 858 El Djezaïr (Algiers)
- 859 Bouzaréah (Bouzareah)
- 1213 Algeria (Algeria)

=== Angola ===
- 1431 Luanda (Luanda)
- 1712 Angola (Angola)
- 1784 Benguella (Benguela)

=== Egypt ===
==== Cities ====
- 4355 Memphis (Memphis)
- 5249 Giza (Giza)
- 110296 Luxor (Luxor)
- 321484 Marsaalam (Marsa Alam)

==== Natural features ====
- 21009 Agilkia (Agilkia Island)
- 24663 Philae (Philae Island)

==== Buildings ====
- 32776 Nriag (National Research Institute of Astronomy and Geophysics)
- 51895 Biblialexa (Bibliotheca Alexandrina)
- 110300 Abusimbel (Abu Simbel)
- 332632 Pharos (Lighthouse of Alexandria)

=== Kenya ===
- 1278 Kenya (Kenya)
- 1356 Nyanza (Nyanza Province)
- 1428 Mombasa (Mombasa)
- 1641 Tana (Tana River)

=== Morocco ===
- 6215 Mehdia (Mehdya)
- 42776 Casablanca (Casablanca)
- 68718 Safi (Safi)
- 200020 Cadi Ayyad (Cadi Ayyad University)

=== Mozambique ===
- 1393 Sofala (Sofala Province)
- 1474 Beira (Beira)

=== South Africa ===
==== Provinces ====
- 715 Transvaalia (Transvaal Province)
- 1195 Orangia (Orange Free State Province)

==== Cities, towns and villages ====
- 790 Pretoria (Pretoria, Gauteng)
- 1245 Calvinia (Calvinia, Northern Cape)
- 1324 Knysna (Knysna, Western Cape)
- 1325 Inanda (Inanda, KwaZulu-Natal)
- 1359 Prieska (Prieska, Northern Cape)
- 1367 Nongoma (Nongoma, KwaZulu-Natal)
- 1397 Umtata (Mthatha, Eastern Cape)
- 1879 Broederstroom (Broederstroom, North West)
- 1949 Messina (Musina, Limpopo)
- 260824 Hermanus (Hermanus, Western Cape)

==== Natural features ====
- 1032 Pafuri (Pafuri River)
- 1264 Letaba (Letaba River)
- 1305 Pongola (Pongola River)
- 1321 Majuba (Majuba Hill)
- 1323 Tugela (Tugela River)
- 1327 Namaqua (Namaqua National Park)
- 1394 Algoa (Algoa Bay)
- 1396 Outeniqua (Outeniqua Mountains)
- 1456 Saldanha (Saldanha Bay)
- 1490 Limpopo (Limpopo River)
- 1914 Hartbeespoortdam (Hartbeespoort Dam)
- 2066 Palala (Palala River)

==== Buildings ====
- 1585 Union (Union Observatory)

=== Tanzania ===
- 1427 Ruvuma (Ruvuma River)
- 1429 Pemba (Pemba Island)
- 1595 Tanga (Tanga)
- 10377 Kilimanjaro (Mount Kilimanjaro)

=== Zimbabwe ===
- 1197 Rhodesia (Rhodesia, now Zimbabwe)
- 1467 Mashona (Mashonaland)
- 1676 Kariba (Lake Kariba)

== Asia ==
- 67 Asia (Asia)
- 14519 Ural (Ural River)
- 14612 Irtish (Irtysh River)
- 100936 Mekong (Mekong River)
- 160105 Gobi (Gobi Desert)
- 229864 Sichouzhilu (Silk Road)

=== Japan ===
- 727 Nipponia (Japan)
- 4929 Yamatai (Yamatai, an ancient kingdom in Japan)
- 10727 Akitsushima (Akitsushima, the old name for Japan)
- 23649 Tohoku (Tōhoku Region)
- 29157 Higashinihon (Eastern Japan)

==== Prefectures ====
- 3720 Hokkaido (Hokkaido Prefecture)
- 3829 Gunma (Gunma Prefecture)
- 4703 Kagoshima (Kagoshima Prefecture)
- 5473 Yamanashi (Yamanashi Prefecture)
- 5618 Saitama (Saitama Prefecture)
- 5908 Aichi (Aichi Prefecture)
- 6383 Tokushima (Tokushima Prefecture)
- 6879 Hyogo (Hyōgo Prefecture)
- 7039 Yamagata (Yamagata Prefecture)
- 9993 Kumamoto (Kumamoto Prefecture)
- 11933 Himuka (Miyazaki Prefecture)
- 13188 Okinawa (Okinawa Prefecture)
- 15841 Yamaguchi (Yamaguchi Prefecture)
- 17683 Kanagawa (Kanagawa Prefecture)
- 19509 Niigata (Niigata Prefecture)
- 19534 Miyagi (Miyagi Prefecture)
- 19691 Iwate (Iwate Prefecture)
- 19701 Aomori (Aomori Prefecture)
- 19713 Ibaraki (Ibaraki Prefecture)
- 19731 Tochigi (Tochigi Prefecture)
- 20613 Chibaken (Chiba Prefecture)
- 23638 Nagano (Nagano Prefecture)
- 48736 Ehime (Ehime Prefecture)
- 90875 Hoshitori (Nickname for Tottori Prefecture)

==== Former provinces ====
- 3111 Misuzu (Shinano Province)
- 3150 Tosa (Tosa Province)
- 3165 Mikawa (Mikawa Province)
- 3319 Kibi (Kibi Province)
- 136743 Echigo (Echigo Province)

==== Cities ====
- 498 Tokio (Tokyo)
- 1088 Mitaka (Mitaka, Tokyo)
- 1139 Atami (Atami, Shizuoka)
- 1185 Nikko (Nikkō, Tochigi)
- 2084 Okayama (Okayama, Okayama)
- 2247 Hiroshima (Hiroshima, Hiroshima)
- 2396 Kochi (Kōchi, Kōchi)
- 2478 Tokai (Tōkai, Aichi)
- 3133 Sendai (Sendai, Miyagi)
- 3249 Musashino (Musashino, Tokyo)
- 3290 Azabu (Azabu, Minato, Tokyo)
- 3320 Namba (Namba, Osaka)
- 3473 Sapporo (Sapporo, Hokkaido)
- 3533 Toyota (Toyota, Aichi)
- 3607 Naniwa (Naniwa-ku, Osaka)
- 3785 Kitami (Kitami, Hokkaido)
- 4096 Kushiro (Kushiro, Hokkaido)
- 4157 Izu (Izu, Shizuoka)
- 4263 Abashiri (Abashiri, Hokkaido)
- 4265 Kani (Kani, Gifu)
- 4352 Kyoto (Kyoto, Kyoto)
- 4381 Uenohara (Uenohara, Yamanashi)
- 4407 Taihaku (Taihaku-ku, Sendai)
- 4439 Muroto (Muroto, Kōchi)
- 4461 Sayama (Sayama, Saitama)
- 4491 Otaru (Otaru, Hokkaido)
- 4539 Miyagino (Miyagino-ku, Sendai)
- 4578 Kurashiki (Kurashiki, Okayama)
- 4634 Shibuya (Shibuya, Tokyo)
- 4649 Sumoto (Sumoto, Hyōgo)
- 4720 Tottori (Tottori, Tottori)
- 4797 Ako (Akō, Hyōgo)
- 4873 Fukaya (Fukaya, Saitama)
- 5128 Wakabayashi (Wakabayashi-ku, Sendai)
- 5138 Gyoda (Gyōda, Saitama)
- 5139 Rumoi (Rumoi, Hokkaido)
- 5334 Mishima (Mishima, Shizuoka)
- 5399 Awa (Awa, Tokushima)
- 5435 Kameoka (Kameoka, Kyoto)
- 5629 Kuwana (Kuwana, Mie)
- 5775 Inuyama (Inuyama, Aichi)
- 5783 Kumagaya (Kumagaya, Saitama)
- 5790 Nagasaki (Nagasaki, Nagasaki)
- 5881 Akashi (Akashi, Hyōgo)
- 5909 Nagoya (Nagoya, Aichi)
- 5960 Wakkanai (Wakkanai, Hokkaido)
- 6089 Izumi (Izumi-ku, Sendai)
- 6198 Shirakawa (Shirakawa, Fukushima)
- 6228 Yonezawa (Yonezawa, Yamagata)
- 6275 Kiryu (Kiryū, Gunma)
- 6419 Susono (Susono, Shizuoka)
- 6612 Hachioji (Hachiōji, Tokyo)
- 6655 Nagahama (Nagahama, Shiga)
- 6657 Otukyo (Ōtsu, Shiga)
- 6663 Tatebayashi (Tatebayashi, Gunma)
- 6720 Gifu (Gifu, Gifu)
- 6721 Minamiawaji (Minamiawaji, Hyōgo)
- 6991 Chichibu (Chichibu, Saitama)
- 7023 Heiankyo (Nickname of Kyoto)
- 7028 Tachikawa (Tachikawa, Tokyo)
- 7038 Tokorozawa (Tokorozawa, Saitama)
- 7067 Kiyose (Kiyose, Tokyo)
- 7137 Ageo (Ageo, Saitama)
- 7252 Kakegawa (Kakegawa, Shizuoka)
- 7253 Nara (Nara, Nara)
- 7434 Osaka (Osaka, Osaka)
- 7435 Sagamihara (Sagamihara, Kanagawa)
- 7530 Mizusawa (Mizusawa, Iwate)
- 7678 Onoda (Onoda, Yamaguchi)
- 7716 Ube (Ube, Yamaguchi)
- 7788 Tsukuba (Tsukuba, Ibaraki)
- 7851 Azumino (Azumino, Nagano)
- 7895 Kaseda (Kaseda, Kagoshima)
- 8113 Matsue (Matsue, Shimane)
- 8120 Kobe (Kobe, Hyōgo)
- 8220 Nanyou (Nan'yō, Yamagata)
- 8234 Nobeoka (Nobeoka, Miyazaki)
- 8892 Kakogawa (Kakogawa, Hyōgo)
- 8924 Iruma (Iruma, Saitama)
- 9191 Hokuto (Hokuto, Yamanashi)
- 9196 Sukagawa (Sukagawa, Fukushima)
- 9580 Tarumi (Tarumi-ku, Kobe)
- 9658 Imabari (Imabari, Ehime)
- 9782 Edo (Edo, a former city in Musashi Province)
- 9887 Ashikaga (Ashikaga, Tochigi)
- 9893 Sagano (Sagano, a neighbourhood in Kyoto)
- 10141 Gotenba (Gotemba, Shizuoka)
- 10163 Onomichi (Onomichi, Hiroshima)
- 10864 Yamagatashi (Yamagata, Yamagata)
- 10878 Moriyama (Moriyama, Shiga)
- 11115 Kariya (Kariya, Aichi)
- 11504 Kazo (Kazo, Saitama)
- 11612 Obu (Ōbu, Aichi)
- 12012 Kitahiroshima (Kitahiroshima, Hokkaido)
- 12391 Ecoadachi (Adachi, Tokyo)
- 12440 Koshigayaboshi (Koshigaya, Saitama)
- 12469 Katsuura (Katsuura, Chiba)
- 13569 Oshu (Ōshū, Iwate)
- 13787 Nagaishi (Nagai, Yamagata)
- 14491 Hitachiomiya (Hitachiōmiya, Ibaraki)
- 14888 Kanazawashi (Kanazawa, Ishikawa)
- 14901 Hidatakayama (Takayama, Gifu)
- 16463 Nayoro (Nayoro, Hokkaido)
- 16713 Airashi (Aira, Kagoshima)
- 17651 Tajimi (Tajimi, Gifu)
- 18469 Hakodate (Hakodate, Hokkaido)
- 18644 Arashiyama (Arashiyama, Kyoto)
- 19953 Takeo (Takeo, Saga)
- 18290 Sumiyoshi (Sumiyoshi-ku, Osaka)
- 20102 Takasago (Takasago, Hyōgo)
- 20204 Yuudurunosato (Nickname for Urushiyama District, Nan'yō, Yamagata)
- 21328 Otashi (Ōta, Gunma)
- 21348 Toyoteru (Toyoteru District, Niigata)
- 22277 Hirado (Hirado, Nagasaki)
- 22745 Rikuzentakata (Rikuzentakata, Iwate)
- 25296 Minamisatsuma (Minamisatsuma, Kagoshima)
- 25892 Funabashi (Funabashi, Chiba)
- 26097 Kamishi (Kami, Kōchi)
- 26319 Miyauchi (Miyauchi, Yamagata)
- 29199 Himeji (Himeji, Hyōgo)
- 29514 Karatsu (Karatsu, Saga)
- 33553 Nagai (Nagai, Yamagata)
- 35093 Akicity (Aki, Kōchi)
- 36472 Ebina (Ebina, Kanagawa)
- 39799 Hadano (Hadano, Kanagawa)
- 41481 Musashifuchu (Fuchū, Tokyo)
- 46595 Kita-Kyushu (Kitakyushu, Fukuoka)
- 46596 Tobata (Tobata-ku, Kitakyushu)
- 52260 Ureshino (Ureshino, Saga)
- 63389 Noshiro (Noshiro, Akita)
- 63897 Ofunato (Ōfunato, Iwate)
- 64547 Saku (Saku, Nagano)
- 87271 Kokubunji (Kokubunji, Tokyo)
- 118230 Sado (Sado, Niigata)
- 145062 Hashikami (Hashikami, Aomori)
- 181043 Anan (Anan, Tokushima)
- 220736 Niihama (Niihama, Ehime)
- 262419 Suzaka (Suzaka, Nagano)
- 364630 Shizuoka (Shizuoka, Shizuoka)
- 375927 Ibara (Ibara, Okayama)

==== Towns and villages ====
- 1098 Hakone (Hakone, Kanagawa)
- 2470 Agematsu (Agematsu, Nagano)
- 2571 Geisei (Geisei, Kōchi)
- 2908 Shimoyama (Shimoyama, Aichi)
- 2924 Mitake-mura (Mitake, Nagano)
- 2960 Ohtaki (Ōtaki, Nagano)
- 3432 Kobuchizawa (Kobuchisawa, Yamanashi)
- 3565 Ojima (Ojima, Gunma)
- 3823 Yorii (Yorii, Saitama)
- 3997 Taga (Taga, Shiga)
- 4127 Kyogoku (Kyōgoku, Hokkaido)
- 4186 Tamashima (Tamashima, Kurashiki, Okayama)
- 4350 Shibecha (Shibecha, Hokkaido)
- 4353 Onizaki (Onizaki, Aichi)
- 4383 Suruga (Suruga District)
- 4458 Oizumi (Ōizumi, Gunma)
- 4460 Bihoro (Bihoro, Hokkaido)
- 4526 Konko (Konkō, Okayama)
- 4585 Ainonai (Ainonai, Hokkaido)
- 4644 Oumu (Ōmu, Hokkaido)
- 4712 Iwaizumi (Iwaizumi, Iwate)
- 4774 Hobetsu (Hobetsu, Hokkaido)
- 4845 Tsubetsu (Tsubetsu, Hokkaido)
- 5142 Okutama (Okutama, Tokyo)
- 5176 Yoichi (Yoichi, Hokkaido)
- 5215 Tsurui (Tsurui, Hokkaido)
- 5333 Kanaya (Kanaya, Shizuoka)
- 5356 Neagari (Neagari, Ishikawa)
- 5403 Takachiho (Takachiho, Miyazaki)
- 5468 Hamatonbetsu (Hamatonbetsu, Hokkaido)
- 5488 Kiyosato (Kiyosato, Hokkaido)
- 5640 Yoshino (Yoshino, Kagoshima, Kagoshima)
- 5784 Yoron (Yoron, Kagoshima)
- 5851 Inagawa (Inagawa, Hyōgo)
- 5978 Kaminokuni (Kaminokuni, Hokkaido)
- 6024 Ochanomizu (Ochanomizu, Tokyo)
- 6134 Kamagari (Kamagari, Hiroshima)
- 6158 Shosanbetsu (Shosanbetsu, Hokkaido)
- 6197 Taracho (Tara, Saga)
- 6218 Mizushima (Mizushima, Kurashiki, Okayama)
- 6237 Chikushi (Chikushi District, Fukuoka)
- 6255 Kuma (Kumakōgen, Ehime)
- 6276 Kurohone (Kurohone, Gunma)
- 6346 Syukumeguri (Shukumeguri, Gunma)
- 6414 Mizunuma (Mizunuma, Gunma)
- 6444 Ryuzin (Ryuzin, Toyota, Aichi)
- 6667 Sannaimura (Sannai, Akita)
- 6699 Igaueno (Ueno, Mie)
- 6804 Maruseppu (Maruseppu, Hokkaido)
- 6992 Minano-machi (Minano, Saitama)
- 7021 Tomiokamachi (Tomioka, Fukushima)
- 7097 Yatsuka (Yatsuka, Shimane)
- 7143 Haramura (Hara, Nagano)
- 7298 Matudaira-gou (Matsudaira-gou, near Toyota, Aichi)
- 7342 Uchinoura (Uchinoura, Kagoshima)
- 7592 Takinemachi (Takine, Fukushima)
- 8272 Iitatemura (Iitate, Fukushima)
- 8668 Satomimura (Satomi, Ibaraki)
- 9033 Kawane (Kawane, Shizuoka)
- 9041 Takane (Takane, Yamanashi)
- 9107 Narukospa (Naruko, Miyagi)
- 9293 Kamogata (Kamogata, Okayama)
- 9368 Esashi (Esashi, Hokkaido)
- 9382 Mihonoseki (Mihonoseki, Shimane)
- 9719 Yakage (Yakage, Okayama)
- 10178 Iriki (Iriki, Kagoshima)
- 10364 Tainai (Tainai-daira, Kurokawa, Niigata)
- 10365 Kurokawa (Kurokawa, Niigata)
- 10367 Sayo (Sayō, Hyōgo)
- 10368 Kozuki (Kōzuki, Hyōgo)
- 11546 Miyoshimachi (Miyoshi, Saitama)
- 12445 Sirataka (Shirataka, Yamagata)
- 12751 Kamihayashi (Kamihayashi, Niigata)
- 13156 Mannoucyo (Mannō, Kagawa)
- 13207 Tamagawa (Tamagawa, Ehime)
- 13918 Tsukinada (Tsukinada, Ōtsuki, Kōchi)
- 13934 Kannami (Kannami, Shizuoka)
- 13978 Hiwasa (Hiwasa, Tokushima)
- 14314 Tokigawa (Tokigawa, Saitama)
- 14315 Ogawamachi (Ogawa, Saitama)
- 14316 Higashichichibu (Higashichichibu, Saitama)
- 14425 Fujimimachi (Fujimi, Nagano)
- 14469 Komatsuataka (Komatsuataka, Komatsu, Ishikawa)
- 14821 Motaeno (Tamashima, Kurashiki, Okayama)
- 14850 Nagashimacho (Nagashima, Kagoshima)
- 14992 Ogosemachi (Ogose, Saitama)
- 15303 Hatoyamamachi (Hatoyama, Saitama)
- 15316 Okagakimachi (Okagaki, Fukuoka)
- 15350 Naganuma (Naganuma, Hokkaido)
- 15910 Shinkamigoto (Shin-Kamigotō, Nagasaki)
- 16261 Iidemachi (Iide, Yamagata)
- 16507 Fuuren (Fūren, Hokkaido)
- 16594 Sorachi (Sorachi District, Hokkaido)
- 16680 Minamitanemachi (Minamitane, Kagoshima)
- 16700 Seiwa (Seiwa, Kumamoto)
- 17286 Bisei (Bisei, Okayama)
- 18156 Kamisaibara (Kamisaibara, Okayama)
- 19161 Sakawa (Sakawa, Kōchi)
- 19303 Chinacyo (China, Kagoshima)
- 20120 Ryugatake (Ryugatake, Kumamoto)
- 21254 Jonan (Jōnan, Kumamoto)
- 21326 Nitta-machi (Nitta, Gunma)
- 21327 Yabuzuka (Yabuzukahon, Gunma)
- 22470 Shirakawa-go (Shirakawa, Gifu)
- 22885 Sakaemura (Sakae, Nagano)
- 22914 Tsunanmachi (Tsunan, Niigata)
- 23662 Jozankei (Jozankei, Sapporo)
- 24965 Akayu (Akayu, Yamagata)
- 26806 Kushiike (Kushiike, Jōetsu, Niigata)
- 29249 Hiraizumi (Hiraizumi, Iwate)
- 31105 Oguniyamagata (Oguni, Yamagata)
- 33056 Ogunimachi (Oguni, Niigata)
- 36783 Kagamino (Kagamino, Okayama)
- 37720 Kawanishi (Kawanishi, Yamagata)
- 38669 Michikawa (Michikawa, Akita)
- 46634 Minamiaizumachi (Minamiaizu, Fukushima)
- 48807 Takahata (Takahata, Yamagata)
- 58600 Iwamuroonsen (Iwamuro, Niigata)
- 67712 Kimotsuki (Kimotsuki, Kagoshima)
- 68021 Taiki (Taiki, Hokkaido)
- 73782 Yanagida (Yanagida, Ishikawa)
- 102621 Goshinosato (Goshi no Sato, a nickname for Saji, a former town in Tottori Prefecture)
- 145062 Hashikami (Hashikami, Iwate)

==== Natural features ====
- 1089 Tama (Tama River)
- 1090 Sumida (Sumida River)
- 1266 Tone (Tone River)
- 1584 Fuji (Mount Fuji)
- 2330 Ontake (Mount Ontake)
- 2961 Katsurahama (Katsurahama Beach)
- 3182 Shimanto (Shimanto River)
- 3262 Miune (Mount Miune)
- 3380 Awaji (Awaji Island)
- 3392 Setouchi (Setouchi Region)
- 3867 Shiretoko (Shiretoko Peninsula)
- 3914 Kotogahama (Kotogahama Beach)
- 3996 Fugaku (Fugaku, an old name for Mount Fuji)
- 4033 Yatsugatake (Mount Yatsugatake)
- 4095 Ishizuchisan (Mount Ishizuchi)
- 4097 Tsurugisan (Mount Tsurugi)
- 4126 Mashu (Lake Mashū)
- 4223 Shikoku (Shikoku)
- 4256 Kagamigawa (Kagami River)
- 4289 Biwako (Lake Biwa)
- 4399 Ashizuri (Cape Ashizuri)
- 4410 Kamuimintara (Asahi-dake)
- 4584 Akan (Akan Mashu National Park)
- 4670 Yoshinogawa (Yoshino River)
- 4675 Ohboke (Ōboke Valley)
- 4806 Miho (Miho no Matsubara)
- 4839 Daisetsuzan (Daisetsuzan Volcanic Group)
- 4890 Shikanosima (Shika Island)
- 4941 Yahagi (Yahagi River)
- 5059 Saroma (Lake Saroma)
- 5114 Yezo (Ezo)
- 5125 Okushiri (Okushiri Island)
- 5135 Nibutani (Nibutani)
- 5146 Moiwa (Mount Moiwa)
- 5147 Maruyama (Mount Maruyama)
- 5293 Bentengahama (Bentengahama Beach)
- 5294 Onnetoh (Lake Onnetō)
- 5331 Erimomisaki (Cape Erimo)
- 5482 Korankei (Kōrankei Gorge)
- 5508 Gomyou (Gomyou, Kakegawa, Shizuoka)
- 5557 Chimikeppuko (Chimikeppuko Lake)
- 5580 Sharidake (Mount Shari)
- 5603 Rausudake (Mount Rausu)
- 5631 Sekihokutouge (Sekihoku Pass)
- 5679 Akkado (Akkadō Cave)
- 5686 Chiyonoura (Chiyonoura Beach)
- 5751 Zao (Mount Zaō)
- 5848 Harutoriko (Lake Harutoriko)
- 5970 Ohdohrikouen (Odori Park)
- 6088 Hoshigakubo (Hoshigakubo)
- 6247 Amanogawa (Amanogawa River)
- 6270 Kabukuri (Kabukuri Marsh)
- 6302 Tengukogen (Tengukogen Highland Region)
- 6324 Kejonuma (Kejonuma Marsh)
- 6416 Nyukasayama (Mount Nyukasa)
- 6418 Hanamigahara (Hanamigahara Forest Park)
- 6420 Riheijyaya (Riheijaya Forest Park)
- 6422 Akagi (Mount Akagi)
- 6423 Harunasan (Mount Haruna)
- 6462 Myougi (Mount Myōgi)
- 6531 Subashiri (Subaahiri Trail)
- 6747 Ozegahara (Ozegahara Highland)
- 6800 Saragamine (Saragamine Renpō Prefectural Natural Park)
- 6839 Ozenuma (Lake Ozenuma)
- 6881 Shifutsu (Mount Shibutsu)
- 6883 Hiuchigatake (Mount Hiuchigatake)
- 6932 Tanigawadake (Mount Tanigawa)
- 6933 Azumayasan (Mount Azumaya)
- 6961 Ashitaka (Mount Ashitaka)
- 6965 Niyodogawa (Niyodo River)
- 6971 Omogokei (Omogo Gorge)
- 6986 Asamayama (Mount Asama)
- 6987 Onioshidashi (Onioshidashi)
- 6989 Hoshinosato (Chichibu Hoshi-no-sato)
- 6990 Toya (Mount Toya)
- 6995 Minoyama (Mount Minoyama)
- 7017 Uradowan (Urado Bay)
- 7094 Godaisan (Mount Godaisan)
- 7105 Yousyozan (Mount Yosho)
- 7235 Hitsuzan (Hitsuzan Mountain)
- 7274 Washioyama (Mount Washioyama)
- 7287 Yokokurayama (Mount Yokokurayama)
- 7289 Kamegamori (Mount Kamegamori)
- 7358 Oze (Oze National Park)
- 7429 Hoshikawa (Hoshikawa River)
- 7438 Misakatouge (Misaka Pass)
- 7463 Oukawamine (Mount Ōkawa-mine)
- 7562 Kagiroino-Oka (Kagiroino-Oka)
- 7766 Jododaira (Mount Jododaira)
- 7852 Itsukushima (Itsukushima Island)
- 8188 Okegaya (Okegaya Marsh)
- 8374 Horohata (Horohata, an area in Ishikawa, Fukushima)
- 8418 Mogamigawa (Mogami River)
- 8579 Hieizan (Mount Hiei)
- 8581 Johnen (Mount Jōnen)
- 8723 Azumayama (Mount Azuma-kofuji)
- 8730 Iidesan (Mount Iide)
- 8747 Asahi (Mount Asahi)
- 8866 Tanegashima (Tanegashima Island)
- 8874 Showashinzan (Shōwa-shinzan)
- 8922 Kumanodake (Mount Kumanodake)
- 8933 Kurobe (Kurobe Gorge)
- 8937 Gassan (Mount Gassan)
- 9032 Tanakami (Mount Tanakami)
- 9110 Choukai (Chōkai Quasi-National Park)
- 9128 Takatumuzi (Mount Takatumuzi, Yamagata)
- 9147 Kourakuen (Kōraku-en)
- 9153 Chikurinji (Mount Chikurinji)
- 9198 Sasagamine (Mount Sasagamine)
- 9220 Yoshidayama (Mount Yoshida, Kyoto)
- 9409 Kanpuzan (Mount Kanpuzan)
- 9791 Kamiyakurai (Yakuraisan, popularly called Kami Fuji, a mountain)
- 9792 Nonodakesan (Nonodakesan, a mountain)
- 9943 Bizan (Mount Bizan)
- 10091 Bandaisan (Mount Bandai)
- 10143 Kamogawa (Kamo River)
- 10147 Mizugatsuka (Mizugatsuka Park)
- 10154 Tanuki (Lake Tanuki)
- 10157 Asagiri (Asagiri Plateau)
- 10158 Taroubou (Tarobo Highland)
- 10159 Tokara (Tokara Islands)
- 10161 Nakanoshima (Nakanoshima)
- 10164 Akusekijima (Akusekijima)
- 10166 Takarajima (Takarajima)
- 10169 Ogasawara (Bonin Islands)
- 10179 Ishigaki (Ishigaki Island)
- 10400 Hakkaisan (Mount Hakkai)
- 10500 Nishi-koen (Nishi-koen Park)
- 10516 Sakurajima (Mount Sakurajima)
- 11092 Iwakisan (Mount Iwaki)
- 11107 Hakkoda (Hakkōda Mountains)
- 11108 Hachimantai (Mount Hachimantai)
- 11109 Iwatesan (Mount Iwate)
- 11129 Hayachine (Mount Hayachine)
- 11133 Kumotori (Mount Kumotori)
- 11135 Ryokami (Mount Ryōkami)
- 11137 Yarigatake (Mount Yari)
- 11138 Hotakadake (Mount Hotaka)
- 11140 Yakedake (Mount Yae)
- 11146 Kirigamine (Mount Kirigamine)
- 11149 Tateshina (Mount Tateshina)
- 11151 Oodaigahara (Mount Ōdaigahara)
- 11152 Oomine (Mount Ōmine)
- 11154 Kobushi (Mount Kobushi)
- 11155 Kinpu (Mount Kinpu)
- 11159 Mizugaki (Mount Mizugaki)
- 11161 Daibosatsu (Mount Daibosatsu)
- 11494 Hibiki (Hibiki Sea)
- 11827 Wasyuzan (Mount Washu)
- 11878 Hanamiyama (Hanamiyama Mountain)
- 11925 Usubae (Usubae, a beach in Cape Ashizuri in Kōchi)
- 12335 Tatsukushi (Tatsukushi, a beach in Cape Ashizuri in Kōchi)
- 12357 Toyako (Lake Tōya)
- 12383 Eboshi (Ubashima Island)
- 12706 Tanezaki (Tanezaki, a beach in Urado Bay, Kōchi)
- 12749 Odokaigan (Odokaigan, a beach on the Otsuki Peninsula)
- 13039 Awashima (Awashima Island)
- 13094 Shinshuueda (Shinshu Region)
- 13365 Tenzinyama (Mount Tenzinyama)
- 13679 Shinanogawa (Shinano River)
- 13686 Kongozan (Kongozan Mountain)
- 14046 Keikai (Keikai Mountain)
- 14446 Kinkowan (Kinko Bay)
- 14543 Sajigawasuiseki (Sajigawa-suiseki)
- 14701 Aizu (Aizu, Fukushima)
- 14939 Norikura (Mount Norikura)
- 15028 Soushiyou (Soushiyou Garden, Nan'yō, Yamagata)
- 15387 Hanazukayama (Hanazukayama, Fukushima Prefecture)
- 15868 Akiyoshidai (Akiyoshidai Quasi-National Park)
- 16439 Yamehoshinokawa (Yamehoshino River)
- 16449 Kigoyama (Kigoyama Mountain)
- 16466 Piyashiriyama (Mount Piyashiri)
- 16525 Shumarinaiko (Lake Shumarinai)
- 16725 Toudono (Toudono Mountain, Yamagata)
- 16736 Tongariyama (Tongariyama, Yamagata)
- 17465 Inawashiroko (Lake Inawashiro)
- 17673 Houkidaisen (Hōki-Daisen Peak)
- 18609 Shinobuyama (Mount Shinobu, Fukushima Prefecture)
- 19310 Osawa (Osawa, a region in Mitaka, Tokyo)
- 20193 Yakushima (Yakushima Island, Kagoshima Prefecture)
- 20625 Noto (Noto Peninsula)
- 21250 Kamikouchi (Kamikōchi Valley)
- 21302 Shirakamisanchi (Shirakami-Sanchi)
- 21368 Shiodayama (Mount Shioda, Yamagata)
- 22355 Yahabananshozan (Yahabananshozan, Iwate Prefecture)
- 22490 Zigamiyama (Mount Zigami, Yamagata)
- 22719 Nakadori (Nakadōri Region)
- 23468 Kannabe (Kannabe, Hyōgo Prefecture)
- 23478 Chikumagawa (Chikuma River)
- 23587 Abukumado (Abukuma-dō Cave)
- 23727 Akihasan (Mount Akiha, Yamagata)
- 24940 Sankichiyama (Mount Sankichi, Kaminoyama)
- 26151 Irinokaigan (Irino Beach, Kuroshio, Kōchi)
- 27714 Dochu (Dochū-Kōtsu Prefectural Natural Park)
- 27918 Azusagawa (Azusa River)
- 29355 Siratakayama (Mount Shirataka)
- 29362 Azumakofuzi (Mount Azuma-kofuji)
- 30888 Okitsumisaki (Okitsumisaki, a headland)
- 30963 Mount Banzan (Mount Banzan, Sendai)
- 31087 Oirase (Oirase Gorge)
- 32858 Kitakamigawa (Kitakami River)
- 35370 Daisakyu (Tottori Sand Dunes)
- 39679 Nukuhiyama (Nukuhiyama Mountain, Yamagata Prefecture)
- 40774 Iwaigame (Iwaigame Mountain)
- 40994 Tekaridake (Mount Tekari (Tekari-dake))
- 44011 Juubichi (Mount Juubichi, Yamagata)
- 46689 Hakuryuko (Hakuryuko Marsh, Nan'yō, Yamagata)
- 46796 Mamigasakigawa (Mamigasaki River, a branch of the Mogami River)
- 47086 Shinseiko (Lake Shinsei)
- 48495 Ryugado (Ryūga Cave)
- 53157 Akaishidake (Mount Akaishi (Akaishi-dake))
- 55873 Shiomidake (Mount Shiomi (Shiomi-dake))
- 55875 Hirohatagaoka (Hirohatagaoka Hill)
- 58185 Rokkosan (Mount Rokkō)
- 58569 Eboshiyamakouen (Eboshiyama Park, Nan'yō, Yamagata)
- 65716 Ohkinohama (Ohkinohama Beach, Cape Ashizuri)
- 65784 Naderayama (Naderayama, a mountain near Yonezawa, Yamagata)
- 65894 Echizenmisaki (Cape Echizen, Fukui)
- 69496 Zaoryuzan (Zao Ryuzan, a mountain in Yamagata Prefecture)
- 73955 Asaka (Asaka, reclaimed land in Kōriyama)
- 79130 Bandanomori (Mount Bandanomori, Kōchi)
- 79149 Kajigamori (Mount Kajigamori, Kōchi)
- 79152 Abukumagawa (Abukuma River (Abukuma-gawa))
- 85388 Sakazukiyama (Sakazukiyama Mountain, Yamagata Prefecture)
- 94356 Naruto (Naruto Strait)
- 96254 Hoyo (Hōyo Strait)
- 97582 Hijikawa (Hijikawa River)
- 100266 Sadamisaki (Sadamisaki Peninsula, Shikoku)
- 100433 Hyakusyuko (Hyakusyuko Lake, Nagai, Yamagata)
- 120462 Amanohashidate (Amanohashidate, Kyoto)
- 140038 Kurushima (Kurushima Strait)
- 145732 Kanmon (Kanmon Straits)
- 147971 Nametoko (Nametoko Ravine)
- 175613 Shikoku-karst (Shikoku Karst Prefectural Natural Park)
- 190057 Nakagawa (Naka River)
- 333639 Yaima (Yaeyama Islands, Okinawa)
- 571535 Okunoto (Oku-Noto, Ishikawa Prefecture)

==== Buildings ====
- 2271 Kiso (Kiso Observatory)
- 2582 Harimaya-Bashi (Harimayabashi)
- 2909 Hoshi-no-ie (Hoshi-no-ie Observatory)
- 3814 Hoshi-no-mura (Hoshi-no-mura)
- 3994 Ayashi (Ayashi Station of the Sendai Obs.)
- 4106 Nada (Nada High School)
- 4212 Sansyu-Asuke (Sanshu Asukeyashiki Museum)
- 4261 Gekko (Gekko Observatory)
- 4272 Entsuji (Entsuji Temple)
- 4288 Tokyotech (Tokyo Institute of Technology)
- 4292 Aoba (Aoba Castle)
- 4403 Kuniharu (Kuniharu Observatory)
- 4459 Nusamaibashi (Nusamai Bridge)
- 4496 Kamimachi (Kamimachi, in Kōchi)
- 4607 Seilandfarm (Seilandfarm, near Kitami)
- 4645 Tentaikojo (Star Factory Museum)
- 5069 Tokeidai (Sapporo Clock Tower)
- 5240 Kwasan (Kwasan Observatory)
- 5401 Minamioda (Minami-Oda Observatory)
- 5474 Gingasen (Gingasen Railroad Track)
- 5825 Rakuyou (Rakuyo Technical High School)
- 6071 Sakitama (Saitama Prefectural Museum of the Sakitama Ancient Burial Mounds)
- 6218 Mizushima (Mizushima)
- 6329 Hikonejyo (Hikone Castle)
- 6725 Engyoji (Engyō-ji Temple, Himeji)
- 7484 Dogo Onsen (Dōgo Onsen)
- 7533 Seiraiji (Seiraiji Temple, Sumoto, Hyōgo)
- 7634 Shizutani-Kou (Shizutani School)
- 7891 Fuchie (Fuchie Senior High School)
- 7892 Musamurahigashi (Higashimurayama Senior High School)
- 8100 Nobeyama (Nobeyama Radio Observatory)
- 8533 Oohira (Nihondaira Observatory)
- 8572 Nijo (Nijō Castle)
- 8738 Saji (Saji Observatory)
- 8865 Yakiimo (JCPM Yakiimo Station)
- 9215 Taiyonoto (Tower of the Sun)
- 9235 Shimanamikaido (Nishiseto Expressway)
- 9350 Waseda (Waseda University)
- 9436 Shudo (Shudo Junior and Senior High School)
- 9650 Okadaira (Okadaira Shell Mound)
- 9783 Tensho-kan (Tensho-kan Planetarium)
- 9784 Yotsubashi (Yotsubashi Station)
- 9990 Niiyaeki (Niiya Station, Ōzu, Ehime)
- 10318 Sumaura (Sumaura Elementary School)
- 10399 Nishiharima (Nishi-Harima Observatory)
- 10572 Kominejo (Komine Castle)
- 11258 Aoyama (Aoyama Gakuin University)
- 11442 Seijin-Sanso (Seijin-Sanso Observing Station)
- 11515 Oshijyo (Oshi Castle)
- 11873 Kokuseibi (National Museum of Western Art)
- 12432 Usuda (Usuda Deep Space Center)
- 12690 Kochimiraikagaku (Kōchi MIRAI Science Center)
- 12746 Yumeginga (Space and Science Museum, Takeo, Saga)
- 12810 Okumiomote (Okumiomote Dam)
- 13015 Noradokei (Nora Dokei Clock, Aki, Kōchi)
- 13564 Kodomomiraikan (Museum of Future for Kids, Edogawa, Tokyo)
- 13654 Masuda (Masuda Tracking and Communications Station)
- 13989 Murikabushi (Murikabushi Telescope, Ishigakijima Astronomical Observatory)
- 14031 Rozyo (Rozyo Elementary School, Ishikawa)
- 14313 Dodaira (Dodaira Station)
- 14441 Atakanoseki (Atakanoseki, a checkpoint in Komatsu, Ishikawa)
- 14449 Myogizinzya (Myogizinzya Shrine on Mount Myōgi)
- 14492 Bistar (Bistar Astronomical Observatory, Hitachiōmiya)
- 14843 Tanna (Tanna, a tunnel on the Tokaido Shinkansen)
- 14981 Uenoiwakura (Iwakura High School, Ueno)
- 15526 Kokura (Kokura High School, Kitakyushu)
- 15552 Sandashounkan (Sandashounkan High School, Sanda)
- 15786 Hoshioka (Hoshioka Kindergarten, Matsuyama)
- 15843 Comcom (Com Com Science Museum, Fukushima)
- 15921 Kintaikyo (Kintai Bridge)
- 16644 Otemaedaigaku (Otemae College)
- 16650 Sakushingakuin (Sakushin Gakuin University)
- 17645 Inarimori (Inarimori Kofun)
- 18322 Korokan (Kōrokan)
- 18553 Kinkakuji (Kinkaku-ji)
- 19083 Mizuki (Mizuki Castle, Fukuoka)
- 19853 Ichinomiya (Ichinomiya High School)
- 20107 Nanyotenmondai (Nanyo Citizen's Observatory)
- 21014 Daishi (Daishi Elementary School)
- 22385 Fujimoriboshi (Fujimori High School)
- 23259 Miwadagakuen (Miwada Gakuen Girls' Junior & Senior High School)
- 24640 Omiwa (Ōmiwa Shrine)
- 24889 Tamurahosinomura (Tamura Hoshinomura Observatory)
- 26127 Otakasakajyo (Kōchi Castle)
- 26829 Sakaihoikuen (Sakaihoikuen Kindergarten)
- 26998 Iriso (Iriso Station)
- 27182 Korinotenmondai (Korino Observatory)
- 29144 Taitokufuji (Fuji Elementary School, Tokyo)
- 29252 Konjikido (Chūson-ji)
- 29337 Hakurojo (Himeji Castle)
- 31151 Sajichugaku (Sajichugaku, a high school in Saji)
- 35062 Sakuranosyou (Sakurano Elementary School, Tokyo)
- 37529 Ama-Miyayama (Ama-Miyayama burial mound, Osaka)
- 37626 Meizen (Meizen High School, Fukuoka)
- 39712 Ehimedaigaku (Ehime University)
- 43605 Gakuho (Aizu Gakuho High School, Aizuwakamatsu)
- 44013 Iidetenmomdai (Iide Astronomical Observatory)
- 48408 Yoshinogari (Yoshinogari, a historical site in Saga Prefecture)
- 48607 Yamagatatemodai (Yamagata Astronomical Observatory)
- 52285 Kakurinji (Kakurin-ji, a temple complex in Kakogawa, Hyōgo)
- 52421 Daihoji (Daihoji Temple)
- 52500 Kanata (KANATA Telescope)
- 52601 Iwayaji (Iwayaji Temple)
- 54510 Yakagehonjin (Yakage honjin, a former accommodation in Okayama)
- 54862 Sundaigakuen (Sundai Gakuen High School, Tokyo)
- 73862 Mochigasechugaku (Mochigase High school, Mochigase, Tottori)
- 85400 Shiratakachu (Shirata Chugakko)
- 90844 Todai (University of Tokyo)
- 92097 Aidai (Ehime University)
- 100483 NAOJ (National Astronomical Observatory of Japan)
- 105675 Kamiukena (Kamiukena High School)
- 107805 Saibi (Saibi High School)
- 108720 Kamikuroiwa (Kamikuroiwaiwakage Site)
- 150129 Besshi (Besshi copper mine)
- 187531 Omorichugakkou (Omorichugakkou Junior High School, Suzaka, Nagano)
- 208499 Shokasonjuku (Shōkasonjuku Academy, Yamaguchi)
- 278735 Kamioka (Kamioka Observatory, Gifu Prefecture)
- 456378 Akashikaikyo (Akashi Kaikyo Bridge, Kobe)
- 849224 Motoyama (Motoyama-juku)
- 865364 Daianji (Okayama Daianji Secondary School)
- 869243 Kuraten (Kurashiki Observatory)

=== Cambodia ===
- 16770 Angkor Wat (Angkor Wat, Cambodia)

=== China ===
==== Country ====
- 1125 China (China)
- 3789 Zhongguo (China)

==== Provinces ====
- 2077 Kiangsu (Jiangsu)
- 2085 Henan (Henan)
- 2162 Anhui (Anhui)
- 2184 Fujian (Fujian)
- 2185 Guangdong (Guangdong)
- 2215 Sichuan (Sichuan)
- 2230 Yunnan (Yunnan)
- 2255 Qinghai (Qinghai)
- 2263 Shaanxi (Shaanxi)
- 2336 Xinjiang (Xinjiang)
- 2344 Xizang (Xizang)
- 2355 Nei Monggol (Inner Mongolia)
- 2380 Heilongjiang (Heilongjiang)
- 2398 Jilin (Jilin)
- 2503 Liaoning (Liaoning)
- 2505 Hebei (Hebei)
- 2510 Shandong (Shandong)
- 2515 Gansu (Gansu)
- 2539 Ningxia (Ningxia)
- 2547 Hubei (Hubei)
- 2592 Hunan (Hunan)
- 2617 Jiangxi (Jiangxi)
- 2631 Zhejiang (Zhejiang)
- 2632 Guizhou (Guizhou)
- 2655 Guangxi (Guangxi)
- 3024 Hainan (Hainan)

==== Province-level cities ====
- 2045 Peking (Beijing)
- 2197 Shanghai (Shanghai)
- 2209 Tianjin (Tianjin)
- 3011 Chongqing (Chongqing)
- 3297 Hong Kong (Hong Kong)
- 8423 Macao (Macau)

==== Cities, towns, counties and villages ====
- 2078 Nanking (Nanjing, Jiangsu)
- 2387 Xi'an (Xi'an, Shaanxi)
- 2425 Shenzhen (Shenzhen, Guangdong)
- 2514 Taiyuan (Taiyuan, Shanxi)
- 2693 Yan'an (Yan'an, Shaanxi)
- 2719 Suzhou (Suzhou, Jiangsu)
- 2729 Urumqi (Ürümqi, Xinjiang)
- 2743 Chengdu (Chengdu, Sichuan)
- 2778 Tangshan (Tangshan, Hebei)
- 2789 Foshan (Foshan, Guangdong)
- 2851 Harbin (Harbin, Heilongjiang)
- 2903 Zhuhai (Zhuhai, Guangdong)
- 3048 Guangzhou (Guangzhou, Guangdong)
- 3051 Nantong (Nantong, Jiangsu)
- 3136 Anshan (Anshan, Liaoning)
- 3139 Shantou (Shantou, Guangdong)
- 3187 Dalian (Dalian, Liaoning)
- 3206 Wuhan (Wuhan, Hubei)
- 3221 Changshi (Changshu, Jiangsu)
- 3239 Meizhou (Meizhou, Guangdong)
- 3335 Quanzhou (Quanzhou, Fujian)
- 3340 Yinhai (Yinhai District, Guangxi)
- 3476 Dongguan (Dongguan, Guangdong)
- 3502 Huangpu (Huangpu District, Guangzhou)
- 3509 Sanshui (Sanshui, Foshan)
- 3543 Ningbo (Ningbo, Zhejiang)
- 3611 Dabu (Dabu County, Guangdong)
- 3650 Kunming (Kunming, Yunnan)
- 3729 Yangzhou (Yangzhou, Jiangsu)
- 3746 Heyuan (Heyuan, Guangdong)
- 4273 Dunhuang (Dunhuang, Gansu)
- 4360 Xuyi (Xuyi County, Jiangsu)
- 4776 Luyi (Luyi County, Henan)
- 4925 Zhoushan (Zhoushan, Zhejiang)
- 5217 Chaozhou (Chaozhou, Guangdong)
- 5384 Changjiangcun (Changjiang, Zhangjiagang, Jiangsu)
- 5537 Sanya (Sanya, Hainan)
- 7485 Changchun (Changchun, Jilin)
- 7859 Lhasa (Lhasa, Tibet)
- 9092 Nanyang (Nanyang, Henan)
- 12418 Tongling (Tongling, Anhui)
- 14656 Lijiang (Lijiang, Yunnan)
- 15001 Fuzhou (Fuzhou, Fujian)
- 19258 Gongyi (Gongyi, Henan)
- 19300 Xinglong (Xinglong County, Hebei)
- 23686 Songyuan (Songyuan, Jilin)
- 24956 Qiannan (Qiannan Buyei and Miao Autonomous Prefecture, Guizhou)
- 31196 Yulong (Yulong Naxi Autonomous County)
- 35366 Kaifeng (Kaifeng, Henan)
- 48619 Jianli (Jianli County, Hubei)
- 48799 Tashikuergan (Tashkurgan Tajik Autonomous County)
- 69869 Haining (Haining, Zhejiang)
- 72060 Hohhot (Hohhot, Inner Mongolia)
- 79418 Zhangjiajie (Zhangjiajie, Hunan)
- 79316 Huangshan (Huangshan City, Anhui)
- 80801 Yiwu (Yiwu County, Xinjiang)
- 85293 Tengzhou (Tengzhou, Shandong)
- 92209 Pingtang (Pingtang County, Guizhou)
- 121001 Liangshanxichang (Liangshan Yi Autonomous Prefecture, Sichuan)
- 161715 Wenchuan (Wenchuan County, Sichuan)
- 168234 Hsi Ching (Western Capital)
- 175633 Yaoan (Yao'an County, Yunnan)
- 185577 Hhaihao (Haikou (Hhaihao City), Hainan)
- 188867 Tin Ho (Tianhe, Guangzhou, Guangdong)
- 207717 Sa'a (Sanya, Hainan)
- 207931 Weihai (Weihai, Shandong)
- 215021 Fanjingshan (Fanjingshan, Guizhou)
- 215458 Yucun (Yucun, a village in Zhejiang)
- 216343 Wenchang (Wenchang, Hainan)
- 231446 Dayao (Dayao County, Yunnan)
- 239200 Luoyang (Luoyang, Henan)
- 256699 Poudai (Puqian, Hainan)
- 278384 Mudanjiang (Mudanjiang, Heilongjiang)
- 301153 Jinan (Jinan, Shandong)
- 321197 Qingdao (Qingdao, Shandong)
- 345959 Dafeng (Dafeng, Yancheng, Jiangsu)
- 362177 Anji (Anji County, Zhejiang)
- 432101 Ngari (Ngari Prefecture, Tibet Autonomous Region)
- 592710 Lenghu (Lenghu, Qinghai)

==== Natural features ====
- 3481 Xianglupeak (Xianglu Peak)
- 3613 Kunlun (Kunlun Mountains)
- 12757 Yangtze (Yangtze River)
- 58418 Luguhu (Lugu Lake)
- 110294 Victoriaharbour (Victoria Harbour, Hong Kong)
- 110297 Yellowriver (Yellow River)
- 121007 Jiaxingnanhu (South Lake, Jiaxing, Zhejiang)
- 178151 Kulangsu (Gulangyu Island (Kulangsu), Xiamen)
- 199947 Qaidam (Qaidam Basin)
- 248388 Namtso (Namtso, a lake in Tibet)
- 295935 Majia (Majia, a hill in Shandong University)

==== Buildings and schools ====
- 3088 Jinxiuzhonghua (Splendid China, themed park in Shenzhen)
- 3494 Purple Mountain (Purple Mountain Observatory)
- 3901 Nanjingdaxue (Nanjing University)
- 4073 Ruianzhongxue (Rui'an Middle School)
- 4245 Nairc (Nanjing Astronomical Instrument Research Center)
- 5013 Suzhousanzhong (Suzhou No. 3 Middle School)
- 7072 Beijingdaxue (Peking University)
- 7800 Zhongkeyuan (Chinese Academy of Sciences)
- 8050 Beishida (Beijing Normal University)
- 8917 Tianjindaxue (Tianjin University)
- 9442 Beiligong (Beijing Institute of Technology)
- 9668 Tianyahaijiao (Tianya Haijiao)
- 10877 Jiangnan Tianchi (Jiangnan Tianchi)
- 10902 Hebeishida (Hebei Normal University)
- 11139 Qingdaoligong (Qingdao University of Technology)
- 15882 Dingzhong (Dingzhou High School)
- 16319 Xiamenerzhong (Xiamen No. 2 Middle School)
- 16982 Tsinghua (Tsinghua University)
- 19298 Zhongkeda (University of Science and Technology of China)
- 22420 Xinanlianda (National Southwestern Associated University)
- 23692 Nandatianwenners (Nanjing University Department of Astronomy)
- 24414 Anzhenhosp (Beijing Anzhen Hospital)
- 25146 Xiada (Xiamen University)
- 27966 Changguang (Changchun Institute of Optics, Fine Mechanics and Physics)
- 29438 Zhengjia (Zhengjia Museums, Guangzhou)
- 29467 Shandongdaxue (Shandong University)
- 31129 Langyatai (Langyatai, Qingdao)
- 35313 Hangtianyuan (Astronaut Center of China)
- 48700 Hanggao (Hangzhou High School)
- 52487 Huazhongkejida (Huazhong University of Science and Technology)
- 55838 Hagongda (Harbin Institute of Technology)
- 55892 Fuzhougezhi (Fuzhou Gezhi High School)
- 58941 Guishida (Guizhou Normal University)
- 59000 Beiguan (Beijing Planetarium)
- 64296 Hokoon (Ho Koon Astronomical Centre, Hong Kong)
- 73199 Orlece (Orthopedic Learning Centre, Chinese University of Hong Kong)
- 74092 Xiangda (Xiangtan University)
- 77138 Puiching (Pui Ching Middle School)
- 85410 Ningda (Ningbo University)
- 85558 Tianjinshida (Tianjin Normal University)
- 90830 Beihang (Beihang University)
- 91001 Shanghaishida (Shanghai Normal University)
- 101810 Beiyou (Beijing University of Posts and Telecommunications)
- 118418 Yangmei (Central Academy of Fine Arts)
- 120942 Rendafuzhong (High School Affiliated to Renmin University of China)
- 121014 Neida (Inner Mongolia University)
- 142020 Xinghaishiyan (Xinghai Experimental Senior School)
- 145546 Suiqizhong (Guangzhou No. 7 Middle School)
- 172315 Changqiaoxiaoxue (Changqiao Primary School, Suzhou)
- 179593 Penglangxiaoxue (Penglang School, Kunshan)
- 185535 Gangda (University of Hong Kong)
- 187707 Nandaxianlin (Xianlin University City)
- 189018 Guokeda (University of the Chinese Academy of Sciences)
- 192391 Yunda (Yunnan University)
- 192450 Xinjiangdaxue (Xinjiang University)
- 192515 Xinanjiaoda (Southwest Jiaotong University)
- 200002 Hehe (Suzhou Hehe Culture Foundation)
- 200003 Aokeda (Macau University of Science and Technology)
- 202784 Gangkeda (Hong Kong University of Science and Technology)
- 204839 Suzhouyuanlin (Classical Gardens of Suzhou)
- 207723 Jiansanjiang (Jiansanjiang, Heilongjiang)
- 216319 Sanxia (China Three Gorges University)
- 216446 Nanshida (Nanjing Normal University)
- 227997 NIGLAS (Nanjing Institute of Geology and Limnology, Chinese Academy of Sciences)
- 236743 Zhejiangdaxue (Zhejiang University)
- 236788 Nanxinda (Nanjing University of Information Science and Technology)
- 241113 Zhongda (Sun Yat-sen University)
- 346150 Nanyi (Nanjing Medical University)
- 356768 Shuike (Nanjing Hydraulic Research Institute)
- 361707 Pharmauni (China Pharmaceutical University)
- 406308 Nanwai (Nanjing Foreign Language School)
- 412687 Shaxigao (Shaxi High School, Taicang)
- 420612 Nuptel (Nanjing University of Posts and Telecommunications)
- 445156 Cheeloomed (Cheeloo College of Medicine, Shandong University)
- 448988 Changzhong (Changzhou Senior High School)
- 513340 Xianshiyou (Xi'an Shiyou University)
- 513557 NIGPAS (Nanjing Institute of Geology and Paleontology)
- 526997 Hohai (Hohai University)
- 527205 Zhongdatianwen (Sun Yat-sen University)
- 529729 Xida (Northwest University of China)
- 529828 Jinhuayizhong (Jinhua No. 1 High School)
- 530739 Nanligong (Nanjing University of Science and Technology)
- 530768 Nanpu (Nanjing No. 1 Middle School)
- 546845 Wulumuqiyizhong (Ürümqi No. 1 Senior High School)
- 599587 Shangjiaouni (Shanghai Jiao Tong University)
- 703756 Xijiaouni (Xi'an Jiaotong University)
- 707520 Tongji (Tongji University)
- 719987 Zhonghe (Hefei No. 4 Middle School)

=== Taiwan ===
- 2169 Taiwan (Taiwan)

==== Counties and special municipalities ====
- 147918 Chiayi (Chiayi County)
- 160493 Nantou (Nantou County)
- 171381 Taipei (Taipei)
- 175411 Yilan (Yilan County)
- 175583 Pingtung (Pingtung County)
- 187514 Tainan (Tainan)
- 200033 Newtaipei (New Taipei City)
- 210030 Taoyuan (Taoyuan)
- 212631 Hsinchu (Hsinchu)
- 215080 Kaohsiung (Kaohsiung)
- 237164 Keelung (Keelung)
- 239071 Penghu (Penghu County)
- 246504 Hualien (Hualien County)
- 246643 Miaoli (Miaoli County)
- 281561 Taitung (Taitung County)
- 300892 Taichung (Taichung)
- 336392 Changhua (Changhua County)
- 435728 Yunlin (Yunlin County)
- 755922 Kinmen (Kinmen County and Kinmen National Park)

==== Townships and villages ====
- 185216 Gueiren (Gueiren District, Tainan)
- 185636 Shiao Lin (Siaolin Village, Kaohsiung)
- 210035 Jungli (Zhongli District, Taoyuan)
- 321131 Alishan (Alishan, Chiayi)
- 724875 Hengchun (Hengchun Township, Pingtung)

==== Natural features ====
- 145523 Lulin (Mount Lulin)
- 185546 Yushan (Yushan National Park)
- 207661 Hehuanshan (Hehuanshan)
- 278956 Shei-Pa (Shei-Pa National Park)
- 300286 Zintun (Sun Moon Lake, Nantou)
- 365190 Kenting (Kenting National Park)

==== Buildings and schools ====
- 145534 Jhongda (National Central University)
- 175452 Chenggong (Cheng Kung Senior High School)
- 187636 Chungyuan (Chung Yuan Christian University)
- 204842 Fengchia (Feng Chia University)
- 207655 Kerboguan (National Museum of Natural Science)
- 281569 Taea (Tainan Astronomical Education Area)
- 300150 Lantan (Lan Tan Elementary School)
- 300300 TAM (Taipei Astronomical Museum)
- 320541 Asiaa (Academia Sinica Institute of Astronomy and Astrophysics)
- 528489 Ntuef (National Taiwan University Experimental Forest)
- 590888 Chengda (National Cheng Kung University)
- 713133 Taiping (Taipei Municipal Taiping Elementary School)

=== India ===
- 13117 Pondicherry (Pondicherry)
- 26214 Kalinga (Old name for Odisha)
- 78118 Bharat (Bhārat Ganarājya, native name of the Republic of India)
- 85267 Taj Mahal (Taj Mahal)
- 100292 Harmandir (Golden Temple)
- 230736 Jalyhome (Jalyhome, a school/orphanage for lepers in Pondicherry)

=== Indonesia ===
- 536 Merapi (Mount Marapi, West Sumatra)
- 732 Tjilaki (Cilaki River, West Java)
- 754 Malabar (Mount Malabar, West Java)
- 770 Bali (Bali Island)
- 772 Tanete (Tanete, Sulawesi)
- 863 Benkoela (Bengkulu, Bengkulu)
- 10649 VOC (Dutch East Indies)
- 46824 Tambora (Mount Tambora, Sumbawa, West Nusa Tenggara)
- 85047 Krakatau (Krakatoa, a volcanic island situated in the Sunda Strait, between Java and Sumatra)
- 118102 Rinjani (Mount Rinjani, Lombok Island, West Nusa Tenggara)

=== Korea ===
- 11602 Miryang (Miryang, South Gyeongsang)
- 12252 Gwangju (Gwangju, South Jeolla)
- 31179 Gongju (Gongju, South Chungcheong)
- 34666 Bohyunsan (Bohyeon Mountain)
- 38423 Jeokjungchogye (Jeokchung-Chogye Basin)

=== Maldives ===
- 27596 Maldives (Maldives)
- 27997 Bandos (Bandos Island, Kaafu Atoll)

=== Myanmar ===
- 204705 Pagan (Bagan)

=== Nepal ===
- 6340 Kathmandu (Kathmandu)
- 6918 Manaslu (Manaslu Mountain)
- 33002 Everest (Mount Everest, the highest mountain in the world)

=== Middle East ===
- 313 Chaldaea (Chaldea)
- 1157 Arabia (Arabia)
- 1970 Sumeria (Sumer)
- 13096 Tigris (Tigris River)
- 13128 Aleppo (Aleppo, Syria)
- 13131 Palmyra (Palmyra, Syria)
- 13963 Euphrates (Euphrates River)
- 15861 Ispahan (Ispahan, Iran)
- 56000 Mesopotamia (Mesopotamia)

==== Iraq ====
- 7079 Baghdad (Baghdad, Iraq)
- 15417 Babylon (Babylon, capital of ancient Mesopotamia)
- 22260 Ur (Ur, city-state of ancient Mesopotamia)
- 22292 Mosul (Mosul, Iraq)
- 30936 Basra (Basra, Iraq)

==== Israel and Palestine ====
- 697 Galilea (Galilee)
- 7507 Israel (Israel)
- 52301 Qumran (Qumran Archaeological Site)
- 63163 Jerusalem (Jerusalem)
- 271763 Hebrewu (Hebrew University of Jerusalem)
- 282903 Masada (Masada)

=== Philippines ===
- 13513 Manila (Manila, the capital of the Philippines)
- 134346 Pinatubo (Mount Pinatubo, volcano on Luzon island in the Philippines)

=== Vietnam ===
- 7816 Hanoi (Hanoi)

=== Russia and the former Soviet Union (Asia) ===
==== Countries ====
- 780 Armenia (Armenia)
- 781 Kartvelia (Georgia)
- 1351 Uzbekistania (Uzbekistan)
- 2178 Kazakhstania (Kazakhstan)
- 2469 Tadjikistan (Tajikistan)
- 2566 Kirghizia (Kyrgyzstan)
- 2584 Turkmenia (Turkmenistan)
- 2698 Azerbajdzhan (Azerbaijan)

==== Russia ====
===== Federal subjects =====
- 2120 Tyumenia (Tyumen Oblast)
- 2232 Altaj (Altai Republic)
- 2509 Chukotka (Chukotka Autonomous Okrug)
- 2593 Buryatia (Republic of Buryatia)
- 2607 Yakutia (Sakha Republic)
- 2610 Tuva (Tuva Republic)
- 2656 Evenkia (Evenk Autonomous Okrug)
- 14909 Kamchatka (Kamchatka Krai)

===== Cities, towns and villages =====
- 2036 Sheragul (Sheragul, Irkutsk Oblast)
- 2140 Kemerovo (Kemerovo, Kemerovo Oblast)
- 2890 Vilyujsk (Vilyuysk, Sakha Republic)
- 3158 Anga (Anga, Irkutsk Oblast)
- 3224 Irkutsk (Irkutsk, Irkutsk Oblast)
- 3406 Omsk (Omsk, Omsk Oblast)
- 4271 Novosibirsk (Novosibirsk, Novosibirsk Oblast)
- 4931 Tomsk (Tomsk, Tomsk Oblast)
- 4964 Kourovka (Kourovka, Sverdlovsk Oblast)
- 6404 Vanavara (Vanavara, Krasnoyarsk Krai)
- 7950 Berezov (Beryozovo, Khanty-Mansi Autonomous Okrug)
- 9154 Kol'tsovo (Koltsovo, Novosibirsk Oblast)
- 9567 Surgut (Surgut, Khanty-Mansi Autonomous Okrug)
- 10014 Shaim (Shaim, Tyumen Oblast)
- 10016 Yugan (Nefteyugansk, Khanty-Mansi Autonomous Okrug)
- 13125 Tobolsk (Tobolsk, Tyumen Oblast)
- 21054 Ojmjakon (Oymyakon, Sakha Republic)
- 27736 Ekaterinburg (Yekaterinburg, Sverdlovsk Oblast)
- 29189 Udinsk (Ulan-Ude, Buryatia)
- 38046 Krasnoyarsk (Krasnoyarsk, Krasnoyarsk Krai)
- 364566 Yurga (Yurga, Kemerovo Oblast)

===== Natural features =====
- 1094 Siberia (Siberia)
- 1957 Angara (Angara River)
- 2776 Baikal (Lake Baikal)
- 3049 Kuzbass (Kuznetsk Basin)
- 4042 Okhotsk (Sea of Okhotsk)
- 4189 Sayany (Sayan Mountains)
- 5471 Tunguska (Tunguska Basin)
- 9848 Yugra (Yugra)
- 15267 Kolyma (Kolyma River)
- 15804 Yenisei (Yenisei River)
- 16563 Ob (Ob River)
- 17445 Avatcha (Avacha Bay)
- 17452 Amurreka (Amur River)
- 17543 Sosva (Sosva River)
- 22739 Sikhote-Alin (Sikhote-Alin, near Vladivostok)
- 24701 Elyu-Ene (Lena River)
- 37561 Churgym (Churgym, a minor river near the Tunguska event impact site)
- 73610 Klyuchevskaya (Klyuchevskaya Sopka)
- 212998 Tolbachik (Tolbachik, a volcano complex in Kamchatka Peninsula)

===== Buildings and man-made structures =====
- 2031 BAM (Baikal–Amur Mainline)
- 2585 Irpedina (Pedagogical Institute of Irkutsk State University)
- 343322 Tomskuniver (Tomsk State University)

==== Armenia ====
- 791 Ani (Ani)

==== Georgia ====
- 753 Tiflis (Tbilisi)
- 1135 Colchis (Colchis)
- 1289 Kutaïssi (Kutaisi)
- 1390 Abastumani (Abastumani)
- 2116 Mtskheta (Mtskheta)
- 2671 Abkhazia (Abkhazia)
- 3191 Svanetia (Svaneti Region)
- 3477 Kazbegi (Mount Kazbek)
- 65541 Kasbek (Mount Kazbek)

==== Kazakhstan ====
- 2700 Baikonur (Baikonur Cosmodrome, Kazakhstan)

==== Uzbekistan ====
- 22948 Maidanak (Maidanak, a mountain in the Uzbek part of the Pamir-Alay mountains)
- 210271 Samarkand (Samarkand, the ancient city in Uzbekistan)

=== Sri Lanka ===
- 6568 Serendip (Historical name for Sri Lanka)
- 22802 Sigiriya (Sigiriya Fortress)
- 311231 Anuradhapura (Anuradhapura)
- 607372 Colombounilanka (University of Colombo)

=== Thailand ===
- 13957 NARIT (National Astronomical Research Institute of Thailand)

== Europe ==
- 143 Adria (Adriatic Sea)
- 416 Vaticana (Vatican City)
- 458 Hercynia (Hercynian Forest)
- 480 Hansa (Hanseatic League)
- 1160 Illyria (Illyria)
- 1306 Scythia (Scythia)
- 1307 Cimmeria (Cimmeria)
- 1317 Silvretta (Silvretta Alps)
- 1381 Danubia (River Danube)
- 1444 Pannonia (Pannonia)
- 1989 Tatry (Tatra Mountains)
- 2236 Austrasia (Austrasia, a former kingdom)
- 3016 Meuse (Meuse River, between France, Netherlands and Belgium)
- 3883 Verbano (Lake Maggiore, between Italy and Switzerland)
- 4016 Sambre (Sambre River, between France and Belgium)
- 7671 Albis (Latin name for the Elbe)
- 8020 Erzgebirge (German name for the Ore Mountains)
- 10957 Alps (Alps, a mountain range spanning France, Italy, Austria and Switzerland)
- 10958 Mont Blanc (Mont Blanc, highest Alpine mountain, shared between France and Italy)
- 13121 Tisza (Tisza River)
- 13122 Drava (Drava River)
- 15332 CERN (CERN, spanning France and Switzerland)
- 21663 Banat (Banat, spanning Romania, Hungary and Serbia)
- 22618 Silva Nortica (Silva Nortica, a region at the border of Austria and the Czech Republic)
- 29053 Muskau (Muskau Park, a park spanning Germany and Poland)
- 30773 Schelde (Scheldt, a river crossing Belgium and France)
- 38674 Těšínsko (Těšínsko, a region in south-eastern Silesia, nowadays in the Czech Republic and Poland)
- 40092 Memel (the other name of Neman River)
- 88260 Insubria (Insubria, a historical region straddling Switzerland and Italy)
- 237845 Neris (Neris River)
- 293909 Matterhorn (Matterhorn, a mountain of the Alps)
- 350969 Boiohaemum (Bōiohǽmum, an area around Central Europe)

=== Albania ===
- 358 Apollonia (Apollonia)

=== Austria ===
- 136 Austria (Austria)

==== States ====
- 231 Vindobona (Vienna)
- 397 Vienna (Vienna)
- 6332 Vorarlberg (Vorarlberg)
- 6439 Tirol (Tyrol)
- 6442 Salzburg (Salzburg)
- 6451 Kärnten (Carinthia)
- 6482 Steiermark (Styria)
- 96506 Oberösterreich (Upper Austria)

==== Cities and municipalities ====
- 226 Weringia (Währing, Vienna)
- 844 Leontina (Lienz, Tyrol)
- 1469 Linzia (Linz, Upper Austria)
- 2806 Graz (Graz, Styria)
- 4216 Neunkirchen (Neunkirchen, Lower Austria)
- 9097 Davidschlag (Davidschlag, Upper Austria)
- 13217 Alpbach (Alpbach, Tyrol)
- 15318 Innsbruck (Innsbruck, Tyrol)
- 18398 Bregenz (Bregenz, Vorarlberg)
- 19914 Klagenfurt (Klagenfurt, Carinthia)
- 117156 Altschwendt (Altschwendt, Upper Austria)
- 175730 Gramastetten (Gramastetten, Upper Austria)
- 178243 Schaerding (Schärding, Upper Austria)
- 181824 Königsleiten (Königsleiten, Wald im Pinzgau, Salzburg)
- 185633 Rainbach (Rainbach im Innkreis, Upper Austria)
- 243491 Muehlviertel (Mühlviertel, Upper Austria)

==== Natural features ====
- 431436 Gahberg (Gahberg, a mountain near Weyregg am Attersee in Upper Austria)

==== Buildings and man-made structures ====
- 744 Aguntina (Aguntum)
- 6457 Kremsmünster (Kremsmünster Abbey)

=== Baltic states (Estonia, Latvia, Lithuania) ===
==== Countries ====
- 1284 Latvia (Latvia)
- 1541 Estonia (Estonia)
- 2577 Litva (Lithuania)

==== Estonia ====
- 4163 Saaremaa (Saaremaa)
- 4227 Kaali (Kaali crater)
- 13995 Tõravere (Tõravere)
- 35347 Tallinn (Tallinn)
- 35618 Tartu (Tartu)

==== Latvia ====
- 1796 Riga (Riga)
- 23617 Duna (Daugava River)
- 24709 Mitau (Jelgava)
- 24794 Kurland (Courland)
- 31267 Kuldiga (Kuldīga)
- 37623 Valmiera (Valmiera)
- 274084 Baldone (Baldone)
- 567580 Latuni (University of Latvia)
- 678676 Liepāja (Liepāja)

==== Lithuania ====
- 3072 Vilnius (Vilnius)
- 73059 Kaunas (Kaunas)
- 124192 Molėtai (Molėtai)
- 140628 Klaipėda (Klaipėda)
- 144752 Plungė (Plungė)
- 151430 Nemunas (Nemunas River, the largest river in Lithuania)
- 157534 Šiauliai (Šiauliai)
- 166229 Palanga (Palanga)
- 185150 Panevėžys (Panevėžys)
- 202704 Utena (Utena)
- 233661 Alytus (Alytus)
- 242479 Marijampolė (Marijampolė)
- 248839 Mažeikiai (Mažeikiai)
- 248993 Jonava (Jonava)
- 288959 Biržai (Biržai)
- 289020 Ukmergė (Ukmergė)
- 289121 Druskininkai (Druskininkai)
- 294664 Trakai (Trakai)
- 308934 Merkinė (Merkinė)
- 319601 Šilutė (Šilutė)
- 321045 Kretinga (Kretinga)
- 322539 Telšiai (Telšiai)
- 324417 Kaišiadorys (Kaišiadorys)
- 339855 Kėdainiai (Kėdainiai)
- 346318 Elektrėnai (Elektrėnai)
- 386056 Tauragė (Tauragė)
- 400072 Radviliškis (Radviliškis)
- 431803 Šventoji (Šventoji River)
- 444562 Visaginas (Visaginas)
- 555128 Birštonas (Birštonas)
- 604827 Rietavas (Rietavas)
- 612946 Žirmūnai (Žirmūnai)
- 658882 Žemaitija (Samogitia)
- 833362 Nida (Nida)

=== Benelux (Belgium, Netherlands, Luxembourg) ===
==== Countries ====
- 1052 Belgica (Belgium)
- 2713 Luxembourg (Luxembourg)

==== Belgium ====
- 1145 Robelmonte (Robelmont)
- 1199 Geldonia (Jodoigne)
- 1261 Legia (Liège)
- 1276 Ucclia (Uccle)
- 1294 Antwerpia (Antwerp)
- 1342 Brabantia (Brabant)
- 1593 Fagnes (High Fens)
- 1633 Chimay (Chimay)
- 1717 Arlon (Arlon)
- 1787 Chiny (Chiny)
- 1887 Virton (Virton)
- 2689 Bruxelles (Brussels)
- 2765 Dinant (Dinant)
- 2788 Andenne (Andenne)
- 3121 Tamines (Tamines)
- 3138 Ciney (Ciney)
- 3198 Wallonia (Wallonia)
- 3274 Maillen (Maillen)
- 3365 Recogne (Recogne)
- 3374 Namur (Namur)
- 4172 Rochefort (Rochefort)
- 4191 Assesse (Assesse)
- 4782 Gembloux (Gembloux)
- 7174 Semois (Semois River)
- 9471 Ostend (Ostend)
- 9472 Bruges (Bruges)
- 9473 Ghent (Ghent)
- 9579 Passchendaele (Passendale)
- 9839 Crabbegat (Crabbegat Road, Uccle)
- 10120 Ypres (Ypres)
- 10612 Houffalize (Houffalize)
- 10975 Schelderode (Schelderode)
- 11842 Kap'bos (Kapelle-op-den-Bos)
- 12270 Bozar (Centre for Fine Arts)
- 12276 IJzer (Yser River)
- 12339 Carloo (Carloo)
- 12340 Stalle (Stalle)
- 12341 Calevoet (Calevoet)
- 13293 Mechelen (Mechelen)
- 16908 Groeselenberg (Groeselenberg – a hill in Uccle, where the Royal Observatory of Belgium is located)
- 17428 Charleroi (Charleroi)
- 17437 Stekene (Stekene)
- 19141 Poelkapelle (Poelkapelle)
- 19142 Langemarck (Langemark)
- 30835 Waterloo (Waterloo)
- 59369 Chanco (Toponym for Genk)
- 90717 Flanders (Flanders)

==== Netherlands ====
- 1132 Hollandia (Holland)
- 1133 Lugduna (Leiden)
- 1253 Frisia (Friesland)
- 1336 Zeelandia (Zeeland)
- 1383 Limburgia (Limburg)
- 1385 Gelria (Gelderland)
- 2471 Ultrajectum (Utrecht University)
- 2495 Noviomagum (Radboud University Nijmegen)
- 9497 Dwingeloo (Dwingeloo Radio Observatory)
- 9498 Westerbork (Westerbork Synthesis Radio Telescope)
- 9663 Zwin (Zwin Nature Reserve, on the Belgian–Dutch border)
- 10962 Sonnenborgh (Sonnenborgh Observatory)
- 11945 Amsterdam (Amsterdam)
- 12490 Leiden (Leiden)
- 12634 LOFAR (Low-Frequency Array)
- 12652 Groningen (Groningen)
- 12695 Utrecht (Utrecht)
- 12709 Bergen op Zoom (Bergen op Zoom)
- 12710 Breda (Breda)
- 12716 Delft (Delft)
- 13209 Arnhem (Arnhem)
- 20243 Den Bosch (Den Bosch)
- 27718 Gouda (Gouda)
- 346886 Middelburg (Middelburg)

=== Bulgaria ===
- 2206 Gabrova (Gabrovo)
- 2575 Bulgaria (Bulgaria)
- 2530 Shipka (Shipka Mount and Shipka Pass)
- 3860 Plovdiv (Plovdiv)
- 6267 Rozhen (Rozhen – a locality in the Rhodope Mountains, where the Rozhen Observatory is located)
- 11852 Shoumen (Shumen University)
- 12246 Pliska (Pliska)
- 510466 Varna (Varna)
- 543229 Matiganis (ancient name for Shumen)
- 560085 Perperikon (Perperikon, ancient city and archaeological site)

=== Czech Republic ===
- 2315 Czechoslovakia (Czechoslovakia, now the Czech Republic and Slovakia)

==== Regions ====
- 257 Silesia (Silesia)
- 371 Bohemia (Bohemia)
- 1901 Moravia (Moravia)
- 21257 Jižní Čechy (South Bohemian Region)

==== Cities ====
- 255 Oppavia (Opava)
- 290 Bruna (Brno)
- 2080 Jihlava (Jihlava)
- 2367 Praha (Prague)
- 2524 Budovicium (Latin name for České Budějovice)
- 2889 Brno (Brno)
- 11128 Ostravia (Latin name for Ostrava)
- 11134 České Budějovice (České Budějovice)
- 30564 Olomouc (Olomouc)
- 31650 Frýdek-Místek (Frýdek-Místek)

==== Towns and villages ====
- 1942 Jablunka (Jablůnka)
- 2599 Veselí (Veselí nad Lužnicí)
- 2613 Plzeň (Plzeň)
- 2672 Písek (Písek)
- 2747 Český Krumlov (Český Krumlov)
- 2811 Střemchoví (Střemchoví)
- 3735 Třeboň (Třeboň)
- 4054 Turnov (Turnov)
- 4249 Křemže (Křemže)
- 4277 Holubov (Holubov)
- 4287 Třísov (Třísov)
- 4408 Zlatá Koruna (Zlatá Koruna)
- 4610 Kájov (Kájov)
- 4823 Libenice (Libenice)
- 4824 Stradonice (Stradonice)
- 5894 Telč (Telč)
- 6060 Doudleby (Doudleby)
- 6064 Holašovice (Holašovice)
- 6802 Černovice (Černovice)
- 7118 Kuklov (Kuklov)
- 7204 Ondřejov (Ondřejov)
- 7532 Pelhřimov (Pelhřimov)
- 7694 Krasetín (Krasetín)
- 9711 Želetava (Želetava)
- 9884 Příbram (Příbram)
- 11128 Ostravia (Ostrava)
- 11167 Kunžak (Kunžak)
- 11339 Orlík (Orlík)
- 12010 Kovářov (Kovářov)
- 12468 Zachotín (Zachotín)
- 12833 Kamenný Újezd (Kamenný Újezd)
- 13804 Hrazany (Hrazany)
- 14537 Týn nad Vltavou (Týn nad Vltavou)
- 14974 Počátky (Počátky)
- 15890 Prachatice (Prachatice)
- 15925 Rokycany (Rokycany)
- 15960 Hluboká (Hluboká nad Vltavou)
- 17600 Dobřichovice (Dobřichovice)
- 17607 Táborsko (Tábor District)
- 17608 Terezín (Terezín)
- 18497 Nevězice (Nevězice)
- 18531 Strakonice (Strakonice)
- 20254 Úpice (Úpice)
- 21873 Jindřichůvhradec (Jindřichův Hradec)
- 22450 Nové Hrady (Nové Hrady)
- 24829 Berounurbi (Beroun)
- 24837 Mšecké Žehrovice (Mšecké Žehrovice)
- 24838 Abilunon (Abilunon, nowadays non-existing ancient town)
- 25358 Boskovice (Boskovice)
- 26328 Litomyšl (Litomyšl)
- 26971 Sezimovo Ústí (Sezimovo Ústí)
- 27079 Vsetín (Vsetín)
- 27088 Valmez (Valašské Meziříčí)
- 29760 Milevsko (Milevsko)
- 31232 Slavonice (Slavonice)
- 31238 Kroměříž (Kroměříž)
- 35683 Broumov (Broumov)
- 37279 Hukvaldy (Hukvaldy)
- 38246 Palupín (Palupín, near Strmilov)
- 38684 Velehrad (Velehrad)
- 40206 Lhenice (Lhenice)
- 43954 Chýnov (Chýnov)
- 48638 Třebíč (Třebíč)
- 59001 Senftenberg (Senftenberg, now Žamberk)
- 60423 Chvojen (Chvojen, Benešov District)
- 61208 Stonařov (Stonařov)
- 69469 Krumbenowe (Oldest documented name of Český Krumlov)
- 70409 Srnín (Srnín)
- 100728 Kamenice n Lipou (Kamenice nad Lipou)
- 121089 Vyšší Brod (Vyšší Brod)
- 131181 Žebrák (Žebrák)
- 138979 Černice (Černice, near Český Krumlov)
- 152750 Brloh (Brloh)
- 159799 Kralice (Kralice nad Oslavou)
- 167208 Lelekovice (Lelekovice)
- 175017 Záboří (Záboří)
- 215841 Čimelice (Čimelice)

==== Buildings ====
- 2288 Karolinum (Karolinum)
- 3276 Porta Coeli (Porta coeli Convent)
- 3386 Klementinum (Clementinum)
- 4146 Rudolfinum (Rudolfinum)
- 4339 Almamater (Charles University)
- 6801 Střekov (Střekov Castle)
- 7403 Choustník (Choustník Castle)
- 8343 Tugendhat (Villa Tugendhat)
- 10577 Jihčesmuzeum (South Bohemian Museum)
- 11337 Orlik (Orlík Castle)
- 11364 Karlštejn (Karlštejn Castle)
- 11656 Lipno (Lipno Dam)
- 12406 Zvíkov (Zvíkov Castle)
- 42377 KLENOT (KLENOT)
- 70936 Kámen (Kámen Castle)
- 76628 Kozí Hrádek (Kozí Hrádek, an abandoned castle near Tábor)
- 90892 Betlémská kaple (Bethlehem Chapel)
- 95072 ČVUT (Czech Technical University in Prague)
- 235621 Kratochvíle (Kratochvíle, a chateau)
- 401820 Špilas (Špilberk Castle, Brno)

==== Natural features ====
- 2081 Sázava (Sázava River)
- 2123 Vltava (Vltava River)
- 2199 Kleť (Kleť, a hill and its observatory, place of discovery)
- 2321 Lužnice (Lužnice River)
- 2337 Boubín (Boubín, a hill)
- 2390 Nežárka (Nežárka River)
- 2403 Šumava (Bohemian Forest)
- 3137 Horky (Horký, a hill)
- 4405 Otava (Otava River)
- 4698 Jizera (Jizera River)
- 4702 Berounka (Berounka River)
- 4801 Ohře (Ohře River)
- 7440 Závist (Závist, a hill and Celtic oppidum)
- 7498 Blaník (Blaník, a hill)
- 7669 Malše (Malše River)
- 7711 Říp (Říp, a mountain)
- 8554 Gabreta (ancient name for Bohemian Forest)
- 11163 Milešovka (Milešovka, a mountain)
- 11656 Lipno (Lipno Reservoir)
- 16801 Petřínpragensis (Petřín, a hill in Prague)
- 20964 Mons Naklethi (old name of the hill Kleť)
- 21290 Vydra (Vydra River)
- 31323 Lysá hora (Lysá hora, a mountain)
- 47294 Blanský les (Blanský les, highlands)
- 49448 Macocha (Macocha Gorge)
- 68779 Schöninger (old name for the hill Kleť)
- 71783 Izeryna (Jizera Dark-Sky Park)
- 79347 Medlov (Medlov, a pond near Nové Město na Moravě)
- 159743 Kluk (Kluk, a Czech hill near Kleť mountain)

=== Denmark ===
- 362 Havnia (Copenhagen)
- 2117 Danmark (Danmark, Danish for Denmark)
- 2935 Naerum (Nærum)
- 2676 Aarhus (Aarhus)
- 3033 Holbaek (Holbæk)
- 3309 Brorfelde (Brorfelde Observatory)
- 4453 Bornholm (Bornholm)
- 5116 Korsør (Korsør)
- 5173 Stjerneborg (Stjerneborg Astronomical Observatory)
- 5505 Rundetaarn (Rundetaarn Tower)
- 9272 Liseleje (Liseleje)
- 12188 Kalaallitnunaat (Greenland, an autonomous territory in the Danish Realm)
- 13586 Copenhagen (Copenhagen)

=== Former Yugoslavia ===
- 1554 Yugoslavia (Yugoslavia)

==== Countries ====
- 589 Croatia (Croatia)
- 1564 Srbija (Serbia)
- 9674 Slovenija (Slovenia)

==== Croatia ====
- 142 Polana (Pula)
- 183 Istria (Istria)
- 9244 Višnjan (Višnjan)
- 9429 Poreč (Poreč)
- 9657 Učka (Učka Mountains)
- 10175 Aenona (Nin)
- 10415 Mali Lošinj (Mali Lošinj)
- 10645 Brač (Brač)
- 11194 Mirna (Mirna River)
- 11400 Raša (Raša River)
- 11604 Novigrad (Novigrad)
- 11706 Rijeka (Rijeka)
- 12123 Pazin (Pazin)
- 12124 Hvar (Hvar)
- 12512 Split (Split)
- 12541 Makarska (Makarska)
- 12581 Rovinj (Rovinj)
- 187700 Zagreb (Zagreb)

==== Serbia ====
- 1517 Beograd (Belgrade)
- 1700 Zvezdara (Zvezdara)
- 23718 Horgos (Horgoš)
- 66669 Aradac (Aradac)

==== Bosnia and Herzegovina ====
- 178267 Sarajevo (Sarajevo, the capital and largest city of Bosnia and Herzegovina)

=== Finland ===
- 1453 Fennia (Finland)
- 1656 Suomi (Finland)

==== Historical provinces ====
- 1494 Savo (Savonia)
- 2512 Tavastia (Häme)

==== Cities, towns and villages ====
- 1447 Utra (Utra)
- 1471 Tornio (Tornio)
- 1472 Muonio (Muonio)
- 1495 Helsinki (Helsinki)
- 1496 Turku (Turku)
- 1497 Tampere (Tampere)
- 1498 Lahti (Lahti)
- 1499 Pori (Pori)
- 1500 Jyväskylä (Jyväskylä)
- 1503 Kuopio (Kuopio)
- 1504 Lappeenranta (Lappeenranta)
- 1507 Vaasa (Vaasa)
- 1508 Kemi (Kemi)
- 1512 Oulu (Oulu)
- 1518 Rovaniemi (Rovaniemi)
- 1519 Kajaani (Kajaani)
- 1520 Imatra (Imatra)
- 1521 Seinäjoki (Seinäjoki)
- 1522 Kokkola (Kokkola)
- 1523 Pieksämäki (Pieksämäki)
- 1524 Joensuu (Joensuu)
- 1525 Savonlinna (Savonlinna)
- 1526 Mikkeli (Mikkeli)
- 1659 Punkaharju (Punkaharju)
- 1757 Porvoo (Porvoo)
- 1758 Naantali (Naantali)
- 1786 Raahe (Raahe)
- 1882 Rauma (Rauma)
- 1883 Rimito (Rymättylä)
- 2299 Hanko (Hanko)
- 2397 Lappajärvi (Lappajärvi)
- 2479 Sodankylä (Sodankylä)
- 2501 Lohja (Lohja)
- 2502 Nummela (Nummela)
- 2535 Hämeenlinna (Hämeenlinna)
- 2690 Ristiina (Ristiina)
- 2733 Hamina (Hamina)
- 2737 Kotka (Kotka)
- 2750 Loviisa (Loviisa)
- 2820 Iisalmi (Iisalmi)
- 4066 Haapavesi (Haapavesi)
- 22978 Nyrola (Nyrölä)

==== Natural features ====
- 1460 Haltia (Halti, a fell)
- 1473 Ounas (Ounasjoki, a river tributary)
- 1488 Aura (Aurajoki River)
- 1532 Inari (Lake Inari)
- 1533 Saimaa (Lake Saimaa)
- 1534 Näsi (Lake Näsijärvi)
- 1535 Päijänne (Lake Päijänne)
- 1536 Pielinen (Lake Pielinen)
- 2291 Kevo (Kevo Strict Nature Reserve)
- 2292 Seili (Seili)
- 2678 Aavasaksa (Aavasaksa, a hill)
- 2679 Kittisvaara (Kittisvaara, a mountain)
- 2774 Tenojoki (Tana River)
- 2840 Kallavesi (Kallavesi, a lake)
- 2841 Puijo (Puijo, a hill)

==== Buildings ====
- 1425 Tuorla (Tuorla Observatory)
- 1540 Kevola (Kevola Observatory)
- 1947 Iso-Heikkilä (Iso-Heikkilä Observatory)
- 2194 Arpola (Arpola Cottage)
- 2486 Metsähovi (Metsähovi Radio Observatory)
- 3776 Vartiovuori (Vartiovuori Observatory)
- 4133 Heureka (Heureka Science Center)

=== France ===
- 148 Gallia (Gaul, the Latin name for France)

==== Regions ====
- 374 Burgundia (Burgundy)
- 387 Aquitania (Aquitaine)
- 774 Armor (Armorica)
- 971 Alsatia (Alsace)
- 1114 Lorraine (Lorraine)
- 1256 Normannia (Normandy)
- 1426 Riviera (French Riviera)
- 5778 Jurafrance (Jura Department)
- 7755 Haute-Provence (Haute-Provence)
- 10927 Vaucluse (Vaucluse Department)
- 22827 Avernia (Auvergne)
- 100122 Alpes Maritimes (Alpes-Maritimes Department)
- 272209 Corsica (Corsica)
- 402852 Picardie (Picardy)

==== Cities ====
- 20 Massalia (old name of Marseille)
- 21 Lutetia (old name of Paris)
- 51 Nemausa (old name of Nîmes)
- 138 Tolosa (old name of Toulouse)
- 384 Burdigala (Bordeaux)
- 4690 Strasbourg (Strasbourg)
- 6190 Rennes (Rennes)
- 6268 Versailles (Versailles)
- 4690 Strasbourg (Strasbourg)
- 7462 Grenoble (Grenoble)
- 9376 Thionville (Thionville)
- 9377 Metz (Metz)
- 9378 Nancy-Lorraine (Nancy)
- 9379 Dijon (Dijon)
- 9380 Mâcon (Mâcon)
- 9381 Lyon (Lyon)
- 12279 Laon (Laon)
- 12280 Reims (Reims)
- 12100 Amiens (Amiens)
- 12288 Verdun (Verdun)
- 53005 Antibes (Antibes)
- 326732 Nice (Nice)
- 371220 Angers (Angers)

==== Towns, villages and communes ====
- 336 Lacadiera (La Cadière-d'Azur, Var)
- 346 Hermentaria (Herment, Puy-de-Dôme)
- 605 Juvisia (Juvisy-sur-Orge, Essonne)
- 1599 Giomus (Gien, Loiret)
- 1736 Floirac (Floirac, Gironde)
- 1918 Aiguillon (Aiguillon, Lot-et-Garonne)
- 3920 Aubignan (Aubignan, Vaucluse)
- 5767 Moldun (Meudon, Hauts-de-Seine)
- 6177 Fécamp (Fécamp, Seine-Maritime)
- 7647 Etrépigny (Étrépigny, Ardennes)
- 8371 Goven (Goven, Ille-et-Vilaine)
- 8687 Caussols (Caussols, Alpes-Maritimes)
- 8826 Corneville (Corneville-sur-Risle, Eure)
- 9383 Montélimar (Montélimar, Drôme)
- 9384 Aransio (Orange, Vaucluse)
- 9385 Avignon (Avignon, Vaucluse)
- 9392 Cavaillon (Cavaillon, Vaucluse)
- 9393 Apta (Apt, Vaucluse)
- 9394 Manosque (Manosque, Alpes-de-Haute-Provence)
- 9395 Saint Michel (Saint-Michel-l'Observatoire, Alpes-de-Haute-Provence)
- 10088 Digne (Digne-les-Bains, Alpes-de-Haute-Provence)
- 10233 Le Creusot (Le Creusot, Loire)
- 10374 Etampes (Étampes, Essonne)
- 12281 Chaumont (Chaumont, Haute-Marne)
- 12287 Langres (Langres, Haute-Marne)
- 13701 Roquebrune (Roquebrune-sur-Argens, Var)
- 15034 Décines (Décines-Charpieu, Metropolis of Lyon)
- 15403 Merignac (Mérignac, Gironde)
- 18634 Champigneulles (Champigneulles, Meurthe-et-Moselle)
- 18635 Frouard (Frouard, Meurthe-et-Moselle)
- 18636 Villedepompey (Pompey, Meurthe-et-Moselle)
- 18637 Liverdun (Liverdun, Meurthe-et-Moselle)
- 19306 Voves (Voves, part of Les Villages Vovéens commune, Eure-et-Loir)
- 33300 Bareges (Barèges, Hautes-Pyrénées)
- 35137 Meudon (Meudon, Hauts-de-Seine)
- 39516 Lusigny (Lusigny-sur-Barse, Aube)
- 39641 Pézy (Pézy, part of Theuville commune in Eure-et-Loir)
- 48159 Saint-Véran (Saint-Véran, Hautes-Alpes)
- 86048 Saint-Tropez (Saint-Tropez, Var)
- 100033 Taizé (Taizé, Saône-et-Loire)
- 128627 Ottmarsheim (Ottmarsheim, Haut-Rhin)
- 133404 Morogues (Morogues, Cher)
- 152583 Saône (Saône, Doubs)
- 181702 Forcalquier (Forcalquier, Alpes-de-Haute-Provence)
- 224592 Carnac (Carnac, Morbihan)
- 229631 Cluny (Cluny, Saône-et-Loire)
- 235027 Pommard (Pommard, Côte-d'Or)
- 238593 Paysdegex (Arrondissement of Gex, Ain)
- 259905 Vougeot (Vougeot, Côte-d'Or)
- 262705 Vosne-Romanee (Vosne-Romanée, Côte-d'Or)
- 291847 Ladoix (Ladoix, Côte-d'Or)
- 297026 Corton (Aloxe-Corton, Côte-d'Or)
- 314808 Martindutertre (Saint-Martin-du-Tertre, Val-d'Oise)
- 320065 Erbaghjolu (Erbajolo, Haute-Corse)
- 349606 Fleurance (Fleurance, Gers)
- 375007 Buxy (Buxy, Saône-et-Loire)
- 419521 Meursault (Meursault, Côte-d'Or)
- 423205 Echezeaux (Flagey-Echézeaux, Côte-d'Or)
- 469748 Volnay (Volnay, Côte-d'Or)
- 490628 Chassigny (Chassigny, Haute-Marne)
- 547666 Morgon (Morgon, Rhône)
- 548032 Ensisheim (Ensisheim, Haut-Rhin)
- 552385 Rochechouart (Rochechouart, Haute-Vienne)
- 590761 Fixin (Fixin, Côte-d'Or)
- 597933 Bélesta (Bélesta-en-Lauragais, Haute-Garonne)
- 600639 Gevreychambertin (Gevrey-Chambertin, Côte-d'Or)
- 600665 Nuitsaintgeorges (Nuits-Saint-Georges, Côte-d'Or)
- 649238 Marsloire (Mars, Loire)

==== Natural features ====
- 180 Garumna (Garonne River)
- 364 Isara (Isère River)
- 1333 Cevenola (Cévennes)
- 4943 Lac d'Orient (Lake of Orient)
- 7399 Somme (Somme River)
- 10735 Seine (Seine River)
- 10925 Ventoux (Mont Ventoux)
- 10956 Vosges (Vosges)
- 11875 Rhône (Rhône River)
- 13031 Durance (Durance River)
- 13032 Tarn (Tarn River)
- 13033 Gardon (Gardon River)
- 13256 Marne (Marne River)
- 16900 Lozère (Mont Lozère and Lozère Department)
- 26210 Lingas (Lingas Plateau)
- 30938 Montmartre (Montmartre, a hill in Paris)
- 31110 Clapas (Clapas, a nickname for the Montpellier area)
- 31192 Aigoual (Mont Aigoual)
- 86043 Cévennes (Cévennes National Park)
- 88795 Morvan (Morvan Massif)
- 128633 Queyras (Queyras, a valley)
- 280642 Doubs (Doubs River)
- 336108 Luberon (Luberon Mountains)

==== Buildings and man-made structures ====
- 64 Angelina (Astronomical station ear Marseille)
- 3056 INAG (National Institute for Astronomy and Geophysics)
- 4513 Louvre (The Louvre)
- 11315 Salpêtrière (Pitié-Salpêtrière Hospital)
- 16414 Le Procope (Café Procope)
- 18623 Pises (Pises Observatory)
- 20488 Pic-du-Midi (Pic-du-Midi Observatory)
- 24948 Babote (Tower of Babote)
- 25129 Uranoscope (Uranoscope Observatory)
- 30939 Samaritaine (La Samaritaine, a department store)
- 125592 Buthiers (Burgers Observatory)
- 198993 Epoigny (Les Menhirs d'Époigny, a landmark at Couches, Saône-et-Loire)
- 205424 Bibracte (Bibracte)

=== Germany ===
==== Country ====
- 241 Germania (Germany)

==== States ====
- 301 Bavaria (Bavaria)
- 422 Berolina (Berlin)
- 449 Hamburga (Hamburg)
- 723 Hammonia (Hamburg)
- 5846 Hessen (Hesse)
- 5866 Sachsen (Saxony)
- 6068 Brandenburg (Brandenburg)
- 6099 Saarland (Saarland)
- 6320 Bremen (Bremen)

==== Geographical regions ====
- 333 Badenia (Baden)
- 442 Eichsfeldia (Eichsfeld)
- 930 Westphalia (Westphalia)
- 5616 Vogtland (Vogtland)
- 5835 Mainfranken (Main Franconia)
- 5904 Württemberg (Württemberg)
- 6070 Rheinland (Rhineland)
- 6120 Anhalt (Anhalt)
- 6124 Mecklenburg (Mecklenburg)
- 6209 Schwaben (Swabia)
- 6293 Oberpfalz (Upper Palatinate)
- 6305 Helgoland (Heligoland, a small German archipelago in the North Sea)
- 6402 Holstein (Holstein)
- 6864 Starkenburg (Starkenburg)
- 90672 Metrorheinneckar (Rhine-Neckar Metropolitan Region)

==== Historical entities ====
- 415 Palatia (Electoral Palatinate)
- 5628 Preussen (Preußen (Preussen), German word for Prussia)
- 6396 Schleswig (Duchy of Schleswig)
- 54827 Kurpfalz (Electoral Palatinate)

==== Cities ====
- 263 Dresda (Dresden, Saxony)
- 325 Heidelberga (Heidelberg, Baden-Württemberg)
- 386 Siegena (Siegen, North Rhine-Westphalia)
- 428 Monachia (Munich, Bavaria)
- 470 Kilia (Kiel, Schleswig-Holstein)
- 526 Jena (Jena, Thuringia)
- 717 Wisibada (Wiesbaden, Hesse)
- 765 Mattiaca (Wiesbaden, Hesse)
- 766 Moguntia (Mainz, Rhineland-Palatinate)
- 850 Altona (Altona, a borough of Hamburg)
- 927 Ratisbona (Regensburg, Bavaria)
- 1254 Erfordia (Erfurt, Thuringia)
- 1481 Tübingia (Tübingen, Baden-Württemberg)
- 3053 Dresden (Dresden, Saxony)
- 3825 Nürnberg (Nuremberg, Bavaria)
- 4425 Bilk (Bilk, Düsseldorf, North Rhine-Westphalia)
- 5199 Dortmund (Dortmund, North Rhine-Westphalia)
- 5489 Oberkochen (Oberkochen, Baden-Württemberg)
- 5816 Potsdam (Potsdam, Brandenburg)
- 5820 Babelsberg (Babelsberg, a borough in Potsdam)
- 9336 Altenburg (Altenburg, Thuringia)
- 10114 Greifswald (Greifswald, Mecklenburg-Vorpommern)
- 10775 Leipzig (Leipzig, Saxony)
- 11005 Waldtrudering (Trudering, a neighbourhood in Munich)
- 12111 Ulm (Ulm, Baden-Württemberg)
- 16498 Passau (Passau, Bavaria)
- 55735 Magdeburg (Magdeburg, Saxony-Anhalt)
- 75058 Hanau (Hanau, Hesse)
- 85196 Halle (Halle (Saale), Saxony-Anhalt)
- 100046 Worms (Worms, Rhineland-Palatinate)
- 118173 Barmen (Barmen, Wuppertal)
- 133243 Essen (Essen, North Rhine-Westphalia)
- 104020 Heilbronn (Heilbronn, Baden-Württemberg)
- 204852 Frankfurt (Frankfurt, Hesse)
- 221516 Bergen-Enkheim (Bergen-Enkheim, a borough of Frankfurt)
- 241418 Darmstadt (Darmstadt, Hesse)
- 243097 Batavia (Passau, known as Batavia in Roman times)
- 243440 Colonia (Cologne, North Rhine-Westphalia)
- 243536 Mannheim (Mannheim, Baden-Württemberg)
- 263932 Speyer (Speyer, Rhineland-Palatinate)
- 264020 Stuttgart (Stuttgart, Baden-Württemberg)
- 264131 Bornim (Bornim District, Potsdam)
- 274835 Aachen (Aachen, North Rhine-Westphalia)
- 281140 Trier (Trier, Rhineland-Palatinate)
- 283117 Bonn (Bonn, North Rhine-Westphalia)
- 295565 Hannover (Hanover, Lower Saxony)
- 405207 Konstanz (Konstanz, Baden-Württemberg)

==== Towns and villages ====
- 324 Bamberga (Bamberg, Bavaria)
- 455 Bruchsalia (Bruchsal, Baden-Württemberg)
- 565 Marbachia (Marbach, a borough in Marburg)
- 619 Triberga (Triberg im Schwarzwald, Baden-Württemberg)
- 738 Alagasta (Gau-Algesheim, Rhineland-Palatinate)
- 811 Nauheima (Bad Nauheim, Hesse)
- 1039 Sonneberga (Sonneberg, Thuringia)
- 1346 Gotha (Gotha, Thuringia)
- 1443 Ruppina (Neuruppin, Brandenburg)
- 2183 Neufang (Neufang, Thuringia)
- 3539 Weimar (Weimar, Thuringia)
- 3559 Violaumayer (Violau, Bavaria)
- 3782 Celle (Celle, Lower Saxony)
- 3802 Dornburg (Dornburg, Thuringia)
- 5725 Nördlingen (Nördlingen, Bavaria)
- 8665 Daun-Eifel (Daun, Rhineland-Palatinate)
- 9819 Sangerhausen (Sangerhausen, Saxony-Anhalt)
- 10669 Herfordia (Herford, North Rhine-Westphalia)
- 10745 Arnstadt (Arnstadt, Thuringia)
- 10746 Mühlhausen (Mühlhausen, Thuringia)
- 10747 Köthen (Köthen, Saxony-Anhalt)
- 10774 Eisenach (Eisenach, Thuringia)
- 10801 Lüneburg (Lüneburg, Lower Saxony)
- 11580 Bautzen (Bautzen, Saxony)
- 11916 Wiesloch (Wiesloch, Baden-Württemberg)
- 14080 Heppenheim (Heppenheim, Hesse)
- 18520 Wolfratshausen (Wolfratshausen, Bavaria)
- 30719 Isserstedt (Isserstedt, Jena, Thuringia)
- 32724 Woerlitz (Wörlitz, Saxony-Anhalt)
- 39405 Mosigkau (Mosigkau, Dessau, Saxony-Anhalt)
- 58679 Brenig (Brenig, Bornheim, North Rhine-Westphalia)
- 69264 Nebra (Nebra (Unstrut), Saxony-Anhalt)
- 73686 Nussdorf (Nußdorf, a village in Rhineland-Palatinate)
- 73699 Landaupfalz (Landau/Pfalz, Rhineland-Palatinate)
- 79138 Mansfeld (Mansfeld, Saxony-Anhalt)
- 90711 Stotternheim (Stotternheim, a village in Thuringia)
- 113256 Prüm (Prüm, Rhineland-Palatinate)
- 117506 Wildberg (Wildberg, Baden-Württemberg)
- 149884 Radebeul (Radebeul, Saxony)
- 183182 Weinheim (Weinheim, Baden-Württemberg)
- 207763 Oberursel (Oberursel (Taunus), Hesse)
- 256813 Marburg (Marburg, Hesse)
- 266711 Tuttlingen (Tuttlingen, Baden-Württemberg)
- 270601 Frauenstein (Frauenstein, Saxony)
- 279723 Wittenberg (Wittenberg, Saxony-Anhalt)
- 281764 Schwetzingen (Schwetzingen, Baden-Württemberg)
- 301394 Bensheim (Bensheim, Hesse)
- 340980 Bad Vilbel (Bad Vilbel, Hesse)
- 342000 Neumünster (Neumünster, Schleswig-Holstein)
- 347020 Hofheim (Hofheim am Taunus, Hesse)
- 350178 Eisleben (Eisleben, Saxony-Anhalt)
- 365130 Birnfeld (Birnfeld, a village in northern Bavaria)
- 365159 Garching (Garching, Bavaria)
- 410928 Maidbronn (Maidbronn, a small village in northern Bavaria)
- 435950 Bad Königshofen (Bad Königshofen, Bavaria)
- 501132 Runkel (Runkel, Hesse)
- 557396 Crailsheim (Crailsheim, Baden-Württemberg)

==== Municipalities ====
- 2424 Tautenburg (Tautenburg, Thuringia)
- 6488 Drebach (Drebach, Saxony)
- 7580 Schwabhausen (Schwabhausen, Thuringia)
- 8541 Schalkenmehren (Schalkenmehren, Rhineland-Palatinate)
- 9742 Worpswede (Worpswede, Lower Saxony)
- 14632 Flensburg (Flensburg, Schleswig-Holstein)
- 52334 Oberammergau (Oberammergau, Bavaria)
- 85214 Sommersdorf (Sommersdorf, a municipality in Saxony-Anhalt)
- 142408 Trebur (Trebur, Hesse)
- 301061 Egelsbach (Egelsbach, Hesse)
- 425442 Eberstadt (Eberstadt, a municipality in Baden-Württemberg)

==== Natural features ====
- 1223 Neckar (Neckar River)
- 1302 Werra (Werra River)
- 3229 Solnhofen (Solnhofen Limestone)
- 3674 Erbisbühl (Mount Erbisbühl)
- 4327 Ries (Nördlinger Ries)
- 4611 Vulkaneifel (Volcanic Eifel)
- 4724 Brocken (Brocken Peak)
- 5409 Saale (Saale River)
- 5689 Rhön (Rhön Mountains)
- 5792 Unstrut (Unstrut River)
- 6563 Steinheim (Steinheim Crater)
- 10242 Wasserkuppe (Wasserkuppe, a mountain)
- 10243 Hohe Meissner (Hoher Meißner, a mountain)
- 10244 Thüringer Wald (Thuringian Forest)
- 10245 Inselsberg (Großer Inselsberg, a mountain in Thuringian Forest)
- 10246 Frankenwald (Frankenwald or Franconian Forest, a mountain range in Northern Bavaria)
- 10248 Fichtelgebirge (Fichtelgebirge or Fichtel Mountains, a mountain range in northeastern Bavaria)
- 10249 Harz (Harz, a mountain range in northern Germany)
- 10253 Westerwald (Westerwald, a mountain range in Rhineland-Palatinate, Hesse and North Rhine-Westphalia)
- 10254 Hunsrück (Hunsrück, a mountain range in Rhineland-Palatinate)
- 10255 Taunus (Taunus, a mountain range in Hesse)
- 10659 Sauerland (Sauerland, a hilly area)
- 10661 Teutoburgerwald (Teutoburg Forest)
- 10663 Schwarzwald (Black Forest)
- 10666 Feldberg (Feldberg, a mountain in the Black Forest)
- 10947 Kaiserstuhl (Kaiserstuhl, a mountain range)
- 10948 Odenwald (Odenwald, a mountain range)
- 10949 Königstuhl (Königstuhl, a hill in the Odenwald)
- 10951 Spessart (Spessart, a mountain range)
- 10952 Vogelsberg (Vogelsberg, a mountain range)
- 21074 Rügen (Rügen, Germany's largest island by area)
- 22322 Bodensee (Bodensee, German word for Lake Constance, a lake on the Rhine at the northern foot of the Alps)
- 26757 Bastei (Bastei Rock Formation)
- 29668 Ipf (Ipf, a mountain in Baden-Württemberg)
- 29736 Fichtelberg (Fichtelberg, a mountain)
- 31147 Miriquidi (Nickname for the Erzgebirge Ore Mountains)
- 85217 Bilzingsleben (Bilzingsleben Paleolithic Site)
- 118172 Vorgebirge (Vorgebirge Foothills)
- 150118 Petersberg (Petersberg, a hill near Halle)
- 293809 Zugspitze (Zugspitze, the highest mountain in Germany)
- 365131 Hassberge (Haßberge Hills, a hill range in Bavaria)

==== Buildings and man-made structures ====
- 353 Ruperto-Carola (Ruprecht Karl University of Heidelberg)
- 788 Hohensteina (Hohenstein Castle)
- 797 Montana (Hamburg Observatory)
- 893 Leopoldina (German National Academy of Sciences Leopoldina)
- 905 Universitas (University of Hamburg)
- 1260 Walhalla (Walhalla Memorial)
- 1395 Aribeda (Astronomical Calculation Institute)
- 3496 Arieso (Astronomical Calculation Institute and European Southern Observatory)
- 5478 Wartburg (Wartburg Castle)
- 5509 Rennsteig (Rennsteig Trail)
- 8130 Seeberg (Gotha Observatory)
- 8502 Bauhaus (Bauhaus)
- 12053 Turtlestar (Turtle Star Observatory)
- 14872 Hoher List (Hoher List Observatory)
- 16969 Helamuda (Hessisches Landesmuseum Darmstadt)
- 30779 Sankt-Stephan (St. Stephen's Abbey, Augsburg)
- 38270 Wettzell (Geodetic Observatory Wettzell)
- 58095 Oranienstein (Oranienstein Castle)
- 78386 Deuzelur (German Aerospace Center)
- 85198 Weltenburg (Weltenburg Abbey)
- 85215 Hohenzollern (Hohenzollern Castle)
- 90709 Wettin (Wettin Castle)
- 90712 Wittelsbach (Wittelsbach Castle)
- 110393 Rammstein (Ramstein Air Base)
- 121232 Zerin (ZERIN)
- 204873 FAIR (Facility for Antiproton and Ion Research)
- 293934 MPIA (Max Planck Institute for Astronomy)
- 810657 ESOC (European Space Operations Centre)

=== Greece ===
==== Regions ====
- 1020 Arcadia (Arcadia)
- 1138 Attica (Attica)
- 1142 Aetolia (Aetolia)
- 1150 Achaia (Achaea)
- 1161 Thessalia (Thessaly)

==== Cities and towns ====
- 582 Olympia (Olympia)
- 1162 Larissa (Larissa)
- 4356 Marathon (Marathon)
- 4357 Korinthos (Corinth)
- 110293 Oia (Oia)

==== Historical sites ====
- 382 Dodona (Dodona)
- 5123 Cynus (Cynus)
- 5209 Oloosson (Oloosson)
- 6090 Aulis (Aulis)
- 9431 Pytho (Pytho, an alternate name for Delphi)
- 9590 Hyria (Hyria)
- 9799 Thronium (Thronium)
- 11488 Zeleia (Zeleia)
- 13331 Helos (Helos)
- 42168 Enispe (Enispe)
- 73769 Delphi (Delphi, archaeological site and modern town)

==== Natural features ====
- 570 Kythera (Kythira)
- 1119 Euboea (Euboea)
- 1151 Ithaka (Ithaca)
- 5085 Hippocrene (Hippocrene)
- 19034 Santorini (Santorini)
- 22754 Olympus (Mount Olympus)
- 23405 Nisyros (Nisyros)
- 49036 Pelion (Mount Pelion, Thessaly)
- 293131 Meteora (Meteora, UNESCO World Heritage Site in Thessaly)

=== Hungary ===
- 434 Hungaria (Hungary)
- 1452 Hunnia (Hungary)

==== Cities and towns ====
- 908 Buda (Buda)
- 1109 Tata (Tata)
- 3103 Eger (Eger)
- 6817 Pest (Pest)
- 28196 Szeged (Szeged)
- 64974 Savaria (Szombathely)
- 82071 Debrecen (Debrecen)
- 82092 Kalocsa (Kalocsa)
- 111468 Alba Regia (Alba Regia, Roman name for Székesfehérvár)
- 129259 Tapolca (Tapolca)
- 157141 Sopron (Sopron)
- 157020 Fertőszentmiklós (Fertőszentmiklós)
- 160001 Bakonybél (Bakonybél)
- 209791 Tokaj (Tokaj)
- 217398 Tihany (Tihany, a village in Veszprém County)
- 589718 Csopak (Csopak)
- 589780 Ajka (Ajka)

==== Buildings ====
- 37432 Piszkéstető (Piszkéstető Station)
- 86196 Specula (Eger Observatory)
- 107052 Aquincum (Aquincum)
- 111594 Ráktanya (Ráktanya Hostel)
- 117714 Kiskartal (Kiskartal Observatory)
- 560388 Normafa (Normafa, a tourist destination in Budapest)
- 566631 Svábhegy (Svábhegy, a neighbourhood in Budapest)

==== Natural features ====
- 1513 Mátra (Mátra)
- 2242 Balaton (Lake Balaton)
- 84995 Zselic (Zselic National Landscape Protection Area)
- 84996 Hortobágy (Hortobágy)
- 111570 Ágasvár (Mount Ágasvár)
- 137066 Gellért-hegy (Gellért Hill)
- 159974 Badacsony (Badacsony)
- 161349 Mecsek (Mecsek, a mountain range)
- 167341 Börzsöny (Börzsöny, a mountain range)
- 171118 Szigetköz (Szigetköz Island)
- 207481 Kékes (Kékes, the tallest mountain in Hungary)
- 240697 Gemenc (Gemenc, a forest)

=== Iceland ===
- 20252 Eyjafjallajökull (Eyjafjallajökull)
- 24090 Grindavík (Grindavík)
- 39529 Vatnajökull (Vatnajökull (Glacier of Lakes), the largest glacier in Iceland)
- 85095 Hekla (Hekla, one of Iceland's prominent volcanoes)
- 110299 Iceland (Iceland)

=== Ireland ===
- 2320 Blarney (Blarney)
- 5029 Ireland (Ireland)
- 8813 Leviathan (Leviathan of Parsonstown)

=== Italy ===
- 63 Ausonia (Ausonia, Ancient Greek for lower Italy)
- 69 Hesperia (Greek name for Italy)
- 477 Italia (Italy)

==== Regions ====
- 356 Liguria (Liguria)
- 377 Campania (Campania)
- 487 Venetia (Veneto)
- 1258 Sicilia (Sicily)
- 5162 Piemonte (Piedmont)
- 6851 Chianti (Chianti, a wine-producing region in Tuscany)
- 7199 Brianza (Brianza, a cultural area in Lombardy)
- 8075 Roero (Roero, a traditional region in Piedmont)
- 9289 Balau (Balau Vineyards, Costigliole d'Asti)
- 14486 Tuscia (Tuscany)
- 18116 Prato (Province of Prato)
- 20513 Lazio (Lazio)
- 53252 Sardegna (the Italian name of Sardinia)
- 117093 Umbria (Umbria)
- 168261 Puglia (Apulia (Puglia))
- 207563 Toscana (Tuscany)
- 212705 Friûl (Friuli, a region in Friuli-Venezia Giulia)
- 218636 Calabria (Calabria)
- 335853 Valléedaoste (Vallée d'Aoste, French name for Aosta Valley)

==== Cities ====
- 361 Bononia (Bologna)
- 363 Padua (Padua)
- 472 Roma (Rome)
- 478 Tergeste (Trieste)
- 485 Genua (Genoa)
- 486 Cremona (Cremona)
- 512 Taurinensis (Turin)
- 521 Brixia (Brescia)
- 704 Interamnia (Teramo)
- 1876 Napolitania (Naples)
- 2601 Bologna (Bologna)
- 3344 Modena (Modena)
- 4335 Verona (Verona)
- 4695 Mediolanum (Latin name of Milan)
- 4697 Novara (Novara, Piedmont)
- 4744 Rovereto (Rovereto, Trentino-Alto Adige/Südtirol)
- 5654 Terni (Terni)
- 8051 Pistoria (Pistoia)
- 9523 Torino (Turin, Piedmont)
- 10001 Palermo (Palermo, Sicily)
- 15497 Lucca (Lucca)
- 20171 Salerno (Salerno)
- 30585 Firenze (Florence)
- 214928 Carrara (Carrara, Tuscany)
- 236784 Livorno (Livorno)
- 251619 Ravenna (Ravenna, Emilia-Romagna)
- 277816 Varese (Varese, Lombardy)
- 367436 Siena (Siena, Tuscany)

==== Towns and villages ====
- 554 Peraga (Vigonza, Veneto)
- 1191 Alfaterna (Nocera Inferiore, Campania)
- 1238 Predappia (Predappio, Emilia-Romagna)
- 2694 Pino Torinese (Pino Torinese, Piedmont)
- 4630 Chaonis (Chions, Friuli-Venezia Giulia)
- 4800 Veveri (Veveri, a suburb of Novara, Piedmont)
- 4860 Gubbio (Gubbio, Umbria)
- 5022 Roccapalumba (Roccapalumba, Sicily)
- 5110 Belgirate (Belgirate, Piedmont)
- 5609 Stroncone (Stroncone, Umbria)
- 5802 Casteldelpiano (Castel del Piano, Tuscany)
- 6168 Isnello (Isnello, Sicily)
- 6590 Barolo (Barolo, Piedmont)
- 6289 Lanusei (Lanusei, Sardinia)
- 6645 Arcetri (Arcetri, Florence, Tuscany)
- 6793 Palazzolo (Palazzolo sull'Oglio, Lombardy)
- 6882 Sormano (Sormano, Lombardy)
- 7144 Dossobuono (Dossobuono, Veneto)
- 7198 Montelupo (Montelupo Fiorentino, Tuscany)
- 7481 San Marcello (San Marcello Pistoiese, Tuscany)
- 7499 L'Aquila (L'Aquila, Abruzzo)
- 7501 Farra (Farra d'Isonzo, Friuli-Venezia Giulia)
- 7556 Perinaldo (Perinaldo, Liguria)
- 7665 Putignano (Putignano, Apulia)
- 7675 Gorizia (Gorizia, Friuli-Venezia Giulia)
- 7679 Asiago (Asiago, Veneto)
- 8420 Angrogna (Angrogna, Piedmont)
- 9010 Candelo (Candelo, Piedmont)
- 9101 Rossiglione (Rossiglione, Liguria)
- 9173 Viola Castello (Viola Castello, Piedmont)
- 9278 Matera (Matera, Basilicata)
- 10211 La Spezia (La Spezia, Liguria)
- 10931 Ceccano (Ceccano, Lazio)
- 11359 Piteglio (Piteglio, Tuscany)
- 11360 Formigine (Formigine, Emilia-Romagna)
- 11473 Barbaresco (Barbaresco, Piedmont)
- 11538 Brunico (Bruneck, Trentino-Alto Adige/Südtirol)
- 11595 Monsummano (Monsummano Terme, Tuscany)
- 12987 Racalmuto (Racalmuto, Sicily)
- 13145 Cavezzo (Cavezzo, Emilia-Romagna)
- 13151 Polino (Polino, Umbria)
- 13494 Treiso (Treiso, Piedmont)
- 13684 Borbona (Borbona, Lazio)
- 13920 Montecorvino (Montecorvino Rovella, Campania)
- 15342 Assisi (Assisi, Umbria)
- 15360 Moncalvo (Moncalvo, Piedmont)
- 15372 Agrigento (Agrigento, Sicily)
- 16106 Carmagnola (Carmagnola, Piedmont)
- 16368 Città di Alba (Alba, Piedmont)
- 18335 San Cassiano (San Cassiano, Veneto)
- 18431 Stazzema (Stazzema, Tuscany)
- 18441 Cittadivinci (Vinci, Tuscany)
- 18928 Pontremoli (Pontremoli, Tuscany)
- 18883 Domegge (Domegge di Cadore, Veneto)
- 20048 Alfianello (Alfianello, Lombardy)
- 20071 Viareggio (Viareggio, Tuscany)
- 21287 Santa-Lucia (Santa-Lucia, Stroncone)
- 21337 Sansepolcro (Sansepolcro, Tuscany)
- 24137 Torre del Lago (Torre del Lago, Tuscany)
- 26197 Bormio (Bormio, Lombardy)
- 26917 Pianoro (Pianoro, Emilia-Romagna)
- 27958 Giussano (Giussano, Lombardy)
- 27985 Remanzacco (Remanzacco, Friuli-Venezia Giulia)
- 32891 Amatrice (Amatrice, Lazio)
- 32911 Cervara (Cervara di Roma, Lazio)
- 32945 Lecce (Lecce, Province of Lecce)
- 33100 Udine (Udine, Friuli-Venezia Giulia)
- 34138 Frasso Sabino (Frasso Sabino, Lazio)
- 43193 Secinaro (Secinaro, Abruzzo)
- 44717 Borgoamozzano (Borgo a Mozzano, Tuscany)
- 46692 Taormina (Taormina, Sicily)
- 48268 Comitini (Comitini, Sicily)
- 55427 Rosta (Rosta, Piedmont)
- 66207 Carpi (Carpi, Emilia-Romagna)
- 69245 Persiceto (San Giovanni in Persiceto, Emilia-Romagna)
- 78652 Quero (Quero, Veneto)
- 78661 Castelfranco (Castelfranco Veneto, Veneto)
- 78948 Pietrasanta (Pietrasanta, Tuscany)
- 79271 Bellagio (Bellagio, Lombardy)
- 79900 Coreglia (Coreglia Antelminelli, Tuscany)
- 86195 Cireglio (Cireglio, Tuscany)
- 90278 Caprese (Caprese Michelangelo, Tuscany)
- 90718 Castel Gandolfo (Castel Gandolfo, Lazio)
- 103966 Luni (Luni, La Spezia)
- 113659 Faltona (Faltona, Tuscany)
- 113626 Centorenazzo (Centorenazzo, Emilia-Romagna)
- 126161 Piazzano (Piazzano, Florence)
- 142558 Rosarno (Rosarno, Calabria)
- 152481 Stabia (Castellammare di Stabia, Campania)
- 177853 Lumezzane (Lumezzane, Brescia)
- 185448 Nomentum (the old name of Mentana, Lazio)
- 216345 Savigliano (Savigliano, Piedmont)
- 225076 Vallemare (Vallemare, Lazio)
- 243637 Frosinone (Frosinone)
- 261291 Fucecchio (Fucecchio, Tuscany)
- 278591 Salò (Salò, Lombardy)
- 282034 Torinodisangro (Torino di Sangro, Abruzzo)
- 283057 Casteldipiazza (Castel di Piazza, a village in Tuscany)
- 331011 Peccioli (Peccioli, Province of Pisa)
- 379767 Barcis (Barcis, Friuli-Venezia Giulia)
- 399442 Radicofani (Radicofani, Tuscany)
- 400193 Castión (Castiglione dei Pepoli, Emilia-Romagna)
- 575195 Carpineti (Carpineti, Emilia-Romagna)
- 788153 Trabia (Trabia, Sicily)
- 826631 Frascati (Frascati, Lazio)

==== Natural features ====
- 479 Caprera (Caprera Island)
- 489 Comacina (Isola Comacina)
- 597 Bandusia (Spring of Bandusia)
- 4464 Vulcano (Vulcano Island)
- 6501 Isonzo (Isonzo River)
- 6522 Aci (Jaci River)
- 7233 Majella (Maiella Mountain)
- 7900 Portule (Cima Portule)
- 8944 Ortigara (Mount Ortigara)
- 10038 Tanaro (Tanaro River, the longest river of Piedmont, Italy)
- 10959 Appennino (Apennine Mountains)
- 10960 Gran Sasso (Gran Sasso d'Italia)
- 11249 Etna (Mount Etna, Sicily)
- 11302 Rubicon (Rubicon RIver)
- 12575 Palmaria (Palmaria Island)
- 13897 Vesuvius (Mount Vesuvius)
- 21238 Panarea (Panarea Island, Sicily)
- 23608 Alpiapuane (Apuan Alps)
- 26761 Stromboli (Stromboli, a volcanic island)
- 40134 Marsili (Marsili, a large undersea volcano in the Tyrrhenian Sea)
- 58191 Dolomiten (Dolomite Mountains)
- 129882 Ustica (Ustica, an island in Palermo)
- 344413 Campodeifiori (Campo dei Fiori di Varese)
- 345720 Monte Vigese (Monte Vigese, a mountain in Emilia-Romagna)

==== Buildings and man-made features ====
- 159 Aemilia (Via Aemilia)
- 614 Pia (Pia Observatory)
- 2235 Vittore (Vittore Observatory)
- 14659 Gregoriana (Pontifical Gregorian University)
- 15249 Capodimonte (Astronomical Observatory of Capodimonte)
- 16847 Sanpoloamosciano (San Paolo a Mosciano Observatory)
- 18729 Potentino (Potentino Castle)
- 19968 Palazzolascaris (The Palazzo Lascaris in Turin)
- 24047 Latorredelsole (La Torre del Sole Park)
- 28007 Galhassin (GAL Hassin Planetarium)
- 36033 Viseggi (Monte Viseggi Observatory)
- 43511 Cima Ekar (Cima Ekar Observing Station)
- 66458 Romaplanetario (Planetario Roma)
- 71489 Dynamocamp (Dynamo Camp)
- 100731 Ara Pacis (Ara Pacis)
- 113671 Sacromonte (Sacro Monte di Varese)
- 215970 Campidoglio (Capitoline Hill, a hill in Rome)
- 221769 Cima Rest (Cima Rest Observatory)
- 273994 Cinqueterre (Cinque Terre, Liguria)
- 274246 Reggiacaserta (Royal Palace of Caserta)
- 435127 Virtelpro (Virtual Telescope Project)

=== Malta ===
- 55082 Xlendi (Xlendi)
- 56329 Tarxien (Tarxien Temples)
- 56422 Mnajdra (Mnajdra Temple Complex)

=== Poland ===
- 1112 Polonia (Poland)
- 16689 Vistula (Vistula River)

==== Regions ====
- 257 Silesia (Silesia)
- 38674 Těšínsko (Těšínsko, a region in south-eastern Silesia, nowadays in the Czech Republic and Poland)

==== Cities ====
- 690 Wratislavia (Latin name Wrocław)
- 764 Gedania (Latin name of Gdańsk)
- 1110 Jaroslawa (Paul Herget The Names of the Minor Planets Jarosław?)
- 1263 Varsavia (Latin name Warsaw)
- 1419 Danzig (German name Gdańsk)
- 1572 Posnania (Latin name Poznań)
- 12999 Toruń (Toruń)
- 19981 Bialystock (Białystok)
- 46977 Krakow (Kraków)
- 199950 Sierpc (Sierpc)
- 210147 Zalgiris (Grunwald)
- 320977 Grudziądz (Grudziądz)
- 352214 Szczecin (Szczecin)
- 420779 Świdwin (Świdwin)
- 535266 Chorzów (Chorzów)
- 551231 Żywiec (Żywiec)

==== Buildings ====
- 1352 Wawel (Wawel Castle in Kraków)
- 96765 Poznańuni (Adam Mickiewicz University in Poznań)
- 97786 Oauam (Adam Mickiewicz University Astronomical Observatory)
- 296968 Ignatianum (Jesuit University of Philosophy and Education Ignatianum)
- 604001 Iagiellonica (Jagiellonian University)
- 661178 Żywiecmed (the Hospital in Żywiec)

=== Portugal ===
- 3933 Portugal (Portugal)
- 13599 Lisbon (Lisbon)
- 117993 Zambujal (Castro of Zambujal)
- 792512 Braga (Braga)

=== Romania ===
- 1436 Salonta (Salonta)
- 1537 Transylvania (Transylvania)
- 7986 Romania (Romania)
- 18567 Segenthau (Șagu)
- 100897 Piatra Neamt (Piatra Neamț)
- 708722 Timișoara (Timișoara)

=== Russia and the former Soviet Union (Europe) ===
==== Countries ====
- 232 Russia (Russia)
- 1709 Ukraina (Ukraine)
- 2170 Byelorussia (Belarus)
- 2419 Moldavia (Moldova)

==== Belarus ====
- 3012 Minsk (Minsk)
- 3232 Brest (Brest)
- 3482 Lesnaya (Lyasnaya)
- 237845 Neris (Neris River)
- 264061 Vitebsk (Vitebsk)

==== Russia ====
===== Regions and oblasts =====
- 1146 Biarmia (Bjarmaland, historical region in northern Russia)
- 1391 Carelia (Karelia)
- 1479 Inkeri (Ingria)
- 2287 Kalmykia (Kalmykia)
- 2297 Daghestan (Republic of Dagestan)
- 2657 Bashkiria (Republic of Bashkortostan)
- 2668 Tataria (Republic of Tatarstan)
- 2670 Chuvashia (Republic of Chuvashia)
- 27789 Astrakhan (Astrakhan Khanate, later Astrakhan Oblast)

===== Cities, towns and villages =====
- 787 Moskva (Moscow)
- 830 Petropolitana (Saint Petersburg)
- 1147 Stavropolis (Stavropol, Stavropol Krai)
- 1316 Kasan (Kazan, Republic of Tatarstan)
- 1369 Ostanina (Ostanin, Perm Krai)
- 1480 Aunus (Olonets, Republic of Karelia)
- 1928 Summa (Summa, Republic of Karelia)
- 2046 Leningrad (Leningrad, now Saint Petersburg)
- 2094 Magnitka (Magnitogorsk, Chelyabinsk Oblast)
- 2172 Plavsk (Plavsk, Tula Oblast)
- 2192 Pyatigoriya (Pyatigorsk, Stavropol Krai)
- 2250 Stalingrad (Stalingrad, now Volgograd, Volgograd Oblast)
- 2258 Viipuri (Vyborg, Leningrad Oblast)
- 2447 Kronstadt (Kronstadt, Saint Petersburg)
- 2520 Novorossijsk (Novorossiysk, Krasnodar Krai)
- 2699 Kalinin (Kalinin, now Tver, Tver Oblast)
- 2910 Yoshkar-Ola (Yoshkar-Ola, Mari El Republic)
- 2979 Murmansk (Murmansk, Murmansk Oblast)
- 3073 Kursk (Kursk, Kursk Oblast)
- 3189 Penza (Penza, Penza Oblast)
- 3213 Smolensk (Smolensk, Smolensk Oblast)
- 3544 Borodino (Borodino, Moscow Oblast)
- 3632 Grachevka (Grachyovka, Lipetsk Oblast)
- 3799 Novgorod (Veliky Novgorod, Novgorod Oblast)
- 4071 Rostovdon (Rostov-on-Don, Rostov Oblast)
- 4196 Shuya (Shuya, Ivanovo Oblast)
- 4519 Voronezh (Voronezh, Voronezh Oblast)
- 4621 Tambov (Tambov, Tambov Oblast)
- 5546 Salavat (Salavat, Republic of Bashkortostan)
- 5935 Ostankino (Ostankinsky District, Moscow)
- 6374 Beslan (Beslan, North Ossetia–Alania)
- 7736 Nizhnij Novgorod (Nizhny Novgorod, Nizhny Novgorod Oblast)
- 7924 Simbirsk (Ulyanovsk, Ulyanovsk Oblast)
- 8145 Valujki (Valuyki, Belgorod Oblast)
- 8150 Kaluga (Kaluga, Kaluga Oblast)
- 8498 Ufa (Ufa, Republic of Bashkortostan)
- 8982 Oreshek (Shlisselburg, Leningrad Oblast)
- 8985 Tula (Tula, Tula Oblast)
- 9168 Sarov (Sarov, Nizhny Novgorod Oblast)
- 9612 Belgorod (Belgorod, Belgorod Oblast)
- 10012 Tmutarakania (Tmutarakan, a former principality in Krasnodar Krai)
- 10121 Arzamas (Arzamas, Nizhny Novgorod Oblast)
- 10347 Murom (Murom, Vladimir Oblast)
- 10711 Pskov (Pskov, Pskov Oblast)
- 11480 Velikij Ustyug (Veliky Ustyug, Vologda Oblast)
- 11542 Solikamsk (Solikamsk, Perm Krai)
- 13923 Peterhof (Petergof, Saint Petersburg)
- 15212 Yaroslavl' (Yaroslavl, Yaroslavl Oblast)
- 16515 Usman'grad (Usman, Lipetsk Oblast)
- 21088 Chelyabinsk (Chelyabinsk, Chelyabinsk Oblast)
- 26851 Sarapul (Sarapul, Udmurtia)
- 27709 Orenburg (Orenburg, Orenburg Oblast)
- 30724 Peterburgtrista (Saint Petersburg)
- 32766 Voskresenskoe (Voskresenskoye, Nizhny Novgorod Oblast)
- 37645 Chebarkul (Chebarkul, Chelyabinsk Oblast)
- 216439 Lyubertsy (Lyubertsy, Moscow Oblast)
- 269251 Kolomna (Kolomna, Moscow Oblast)
- 296577 Arkhangelsk (Arkhangelsk, Arkhangelsk Oblast)
- 591763 Orishut' (Orishut', near Yoshkar-Ola, Mari El Republic)

===== Natural features =====
- 762 Pulcova (Pulkovo Heights)
- 1149 Volga (Volga River)
- 1387 Kama (Kama River)
- 1603 Neva (Neva River)
- 1929 Kollaa (Kollaa River)
- 2574 Ladoga (Lake Ladoga)
- 2793 Valdaj (Valdai Hills)
- 2869 Nepryadva (Nepryadva River)
- 5857 Neglinka (Neglinnaya River)
- 5858 Borovitskia (Kremlin Hill)
- 5887 Yauza (Yauza River)
- 9578 Klyazma (Klyazma River)
- 12492 Tanais (Don River)
- 16494 Oka (Oka River)
- 26922 Samara (Samara River)
- 160013 Elbrus (Mount Elbrus, the highest mountain of the Caucasus in Russia)

===== Buildings and man-made structures =====
- 1735 ITA (Institute for Theoretical Astronomy)
- 2188 Orlenok (Orlyonok Camp)
- 2341 Aoluta (Astronomical Observatory of Leningrad University)
- 2360 Volgo-Don (Volga–Don Canal)
- 4185 Phystech (Moscow Institute of Physics and Technology)
- 4447 Kirov (Mariinsky Theatre)
- 4758 Hermitage (Hermitage Museum)
- 5667 Nakhimovskaya (Nakhimov Naval School (Saint Petersburg))
- 5807 Mshatka (Mshatka Estate)
- 5839 GOI (Vavilov State Optical Institute)
- 5859 Ostozhenka (Ostozhenka Street)
- 6355 Univermoscow (Moscow State University)
- 9516 Inasan (Institute of Astronomy of the Russian Academy of Sciences)
- 10007 Malytheatre (Maly Theatre)
- 10010 Rudruna (Patrice Lumumba Peoples' Friendship University of Russia)
- 11011 KIAM (Keldysh Institute of Applied Mathematics)
- 11026 Greatbotkin (Moscow Botkin Multidisciplinary Scientific-Clinical Center)
- 11785 Migaic (Moscow State University of Geodesy and Cartography)
- 11787 Baumanka (Bauman Moscow State Technical University)
- 14312 Polytech (Peter the Great St. Petersburg Polytechnic University)
- 14789 GAISH (Sternberg Astronomical Institute)
- 16356 Univbalttech (Baltic State Technical University)
- 16358 Plesetsk (Plesetsk Cosmodrome)
- 16711 Ka-Dar (Ka-Dar Observatory, Moscow Oblast)
- 22249 Dvorets Pionerov (Pioneers Palace)
- 26793 Bolshoi (Bolshoi Theatre)
- 27660 Waterwayuni (Saint Petersburg State University of Water Communications)
- 27849 Suyumbika (Söyembikä Tower)
- 30722 Biblioran (Library of the Russian Academy of Sciences)
- 48650 Kazanuniversity (Kazan Federal University)
- 65637 Tsniimash (TsNIIMash, an institute in Korolyov)
- 274981 Petrsu (Petrozavodsk State University)
- 328563 Mosplanetarium (Moscow Planetarium)
- 487884 Saoras (Special Astrophysical Observatory of the Russian Academy of Science)
- 549706 Spbuni (Saint Petersburg State University)

==== Ukraine ====
===== Oblasts =====
- 814 Tauris (Ancient name for Crimea)
- 1140 Crimea (Crimea)
- 565139 Sumshchyna (Sumy Oblast)

===== Cities, towns and villages =====
- 951 Gaspra (Gaspra, Autonomous Republic of Crimea)
- 1048 Feodosia (Feodosia, Autonomo, Autonomous Republic of Crimea)us Republic of Crimea)
- 1475 Yalta (Yalta, Autonomous Republic of Crimea)
- 1792 Reni (Reni, Odesa Oblast)
- 2092 Sumiana (Sumy, Sumy Oblast)
- 2093 Genichesk (Henichesk, Kherson Oblast)
- 2121 Sevastopol (Sevastopol, Autonomous Republic of Crimea)
- 2141 Simferopol (Simferopol, Autonomous Republic of Crimea)
- 2171 Kiev (Kyiv)
- 2216 Kerch (Kerch, Autonomous Republic of Crimea)
- 2217 Eltigen (Eltigen, Autonomous Republic of Crimea)
- 2508 Alupka (Alupka, Autonomous Republic of Crimea)
- 2606 Odessa (Odesa, Odesa Oblast)
- 2701 Cherson (Kherson, Kherson Oblast)
- 2894 Kakhovka (Kakhovka, Kherson Oblast)
- 2922 Dikanʹka (Dykanka, Poltava Oblast)
- 2966 Korsunia (Chersonesus, Autonomous Republic of Crimea)
- 2983 Poltava (Poltava, Poltava Oblast)
- 3006 Livadia (Livadia, Autonomous Republic of Crimea)
- 3242 Bakhchisaraj (Bakhchysarai, Autonomous Republic of Crimea)
- 3298 Massandra (Massandra, Autonomous Republic of Crimea)
- 3373 Koktebelia (Koktebel, Autonomous Republic of Crimea)
- 4308 Magarach (Magarach, Autonomous Republic of Crimea)
- 5385 Kamenka (Kamianka, Cherkasy Oblast)
- 5990 Panticapaeon (Pantikapaion, Autonomous Republic of Crimea)
- 7629 Foros (Foros, Autonomous Republic of Crimea)
- 8141 Nikolaev (Mykolaiv, Mykolaiv Oblast)
- 8248 Gurzuf (Gurzuf, Autonomous Republic of Crimea)
- 8445 Novotroitskoe (Novotroitske, Kherson Oblast)
- 9167 Kharkiv (Kharkiv, Kharkiv Oblast)
- 11788 Nauchnyj (Nauchnyi, Autonomous Republic of Crimea)
- 15675 Goloseevo (Holosiivskyi District, Kyiv)
- 24648 Evpatoria (Yevpatoria, Autonomous Republic of Crimea)
- 24649 Balaklava (Balaklava, Sevastopol)
- 117240 Zhytomyr (Zhytomyr, Zhytomyr Oblast)
- 120405 Svyatylivka (Svyatylivka, Poltava Oblast)
- 133293 Andrushivka (Andrushivka, Zhytomyr Oblast)
- 155116 Verkhivnya (Verkhivnya, Zhytomyr Oblast)
- 159011 Radomyshl (Radomyshl, Zhytomyr Oblast)
- 159181 Berdychiv (Berdychiv, Zhytomyr Oblast)
- 161962 Galchyn (Galchyn, Zhytomyr Oblast)
- 175636 Zvyagel (Zviahel, Zhytomyr Oblast)
- 177982 Popilnia (Popilnia Raion, Zhytomyr Oblast)
- 185250 Korostyshiv (Korostyshiv, Zhytomyr Oblast)
- 190026 Iskorosten (Korosten (Iskorosten), Zhytomyr Oblast)
- 199986 Chervone (Chervone, Zhytomyr Oblast)
- 207585 Lubar (Liubar, Zhytomyr Oblast)
- 212465 Goroshky (Khoroshiv, Zhytomyr Oblast)
- 214487 Baranivka (Baranivka, Zhytomyr Oblast)
- 217420 Olevsk (Olevsk, Zhytomyr Oblast)
- 220418 Golovyno (Golovyno, Zhytomyr Oblast)
- 221073 Ovruch (Ovruch, Zhytomyr Oblast)
- 227326 Narodychi (Narodychi, Zhytomyr Oblast)
- 240381 Emilchyne (Yemilchyne, Zhytomyr Oblast)
- 241192 Pulyny (Radyvyliv, Rivne Oblast)
- 241538 Chudniv (Chudniv, Zhytomyr Oblast)
- 246164 Zdvyzhensk (Brusyliv, Zhytomyr Oblast)

===== Natural features =====
- 390 Alma (Alma River)
- 2259 Sofievka (Sofiyivka Park)
- 3441 Pochaina (Pochaina River)
- 19916 Donbass (Donbas Region)
- 216451 Irsha (Irsha River)
- 246132 Lugyny (Luhyny Forest, Zhytomyr Oblast)
- 251001 Sluch (Sluch River)

===== Buildings =====
- 748 Simeïsa (Simeiz Observatory)
- 1725 CrAO (Crimean Astrophysical Observatory)
- 1903 Adzhimushkaj (Adzhimushkay Quarry)
- 1956 Artek (Artek Camp)
- 2760 Kacha (Kacha Military Aviation School)
- 4480 Nikitibotania (Nikitsky Botanical Garden)
- 4868 Knushevia (Taras Shevchenko National University of Kyiv)
- 6166 Univsima (V. I. Vernadsky Taurida National University)
- 6576 Kievtech (Kyiv Polytechnic Institute)
- 10681 Khture (Kharkiv National University of Radioelectronics)
- 10685 Kharkivuniver (VN Karazin Kharkiv National University)
- 13904 Univinnitsa (Vinnytsia State Pedagogical University)
- 24607 Sevnatu (Sevastopol National Technical University)
- 274334 Kyivplaniy (Kyiv Planetarium)
- 318794 Uglia (Ukrainian Humanities Lyceum)

=== Scandinavia ===
==== Countries ====
- 329 Svea (Sweden)
- 11870 Sverige (Sverige, Swedish name for Sweden)
- 11871 Norge (Norge, Bokmål name for Norway)

==== Norway ====
- 4759 Åretta (Åretta School, Lillehammer)
- 5019 Erfjord (Erfjord)
- 15050 Heddal (Heddal)

==== Sweden ====
- 378 Holmia (Holmia, the Latin name for Stockholm)
- 379 Huenna (Ven)
- 460 Scania (Scania)
- 499 Venusia (Ven)
- 809 Lundia (Lund Observatory)
- 1073 Gellivara (Gällivare)
- 1678 Hveen (Ven)
- 2191 Uppsala (Uppsala and Uppsala University)
- 3057 Mälaren (Lake Mälaren)
- 3250 Martebo (Martebo)
- 3331 Kvistaberg (Kvistaberg Observatory)
- 3830 Trelleborg (Trelleborg)
- 6102 Visby (Visby)
- 6171 Uttorp (Uttorp, a village and reserve in Blekinge)
- 6273 Kiruna (Kiruna)
- 6528 Boden (Boden)
- 6654 Luleå (Luleå)
- 6739 Tärendö (Tärendö)
- 6795 Örnsköldsvik (Örnsköldsvik)
- 6796 Sundsvall (Sundsvall)
- 6797 Östersund (Östersund)
- 7248 Älvsjö (Älvsjö)
- 7528 Huskvarna (Huskvarna)
- 7595 Växjö (Växjö)
- 7704 Dellen (Dellen Lakes)
- 7705 Humeln (Lake Humeln)
- 7706 Mien (Lake Mien)
- 7770 Siljan (Lake Siljan)
- 7771 Tvären (Tvären Bay)
- 8678 Bäl (Bäl)
- 8679 Tingstäde (Tingstäde)
- 8680 Rone (Rone)
- 8681 Burs (Burs)
- 8682 Kräklingbo (Kräklingbo)
- 9267 Lokrume (Lokrume)
- 9358 Fårö (Fårö, small island off of Gotland)
- 9359 Fleringe (Fleringe)
- 9372 Vamlingbo (Vamlingbo)
- 9373 Hamra (Hamra)
- 9374 Sundre (Sundre)
- 10102 Digerhuvud (Digerhuvud)
- 10103 Jungfrun (Jungfrun)
- 10104 Hoburgsgubben (Hoburgsgubben)
- 10105 Holmhällar (Holmhällar)
- 10106 Lergrav (Lergrav)
- 10123 Fideöja (Fide and Öja)
- 10124 Hemse (Hemse)
- 10125 Stenkyrka (Stenkyrka)
- 10126 Lärbro (Lärbro)
- 10127 Fröjel (Fröjel)
- 10128 Bro (Bro)
- 10129 Fole (Fole)
- 10130 Ardre (Ardre)
- 10131 Stånga (Stånga)
- 10132 Lummelunda (Lummelunda)
- 10544 Hörsnebara (Hörsne-Bara)
- 10545 Källunge (Källunge)
- 10549 Helsingborg (Helsingborg)
- 10550 Malmö (Malmö)
- 10551 Göteborg (Gothenburg)
- 10552 Stockholm (Stockholm)
- 10553 Stenkumla (Stenkumla)
- 10554 Västerhejde (Västerhejde)
- 10558 Karlstad (Karlstad)
- 10794 Vänge (Vänge)
- 10807 Uggarde (Uggarde)
- 10808 Digerrojr (Digerrojr)
- 10809 Majsterrojr (Majsterrojr)
- 10810 Lejsturojr (Lejsturojr)
- 10811 Lau (Lau)
- 10812 Grötlingbo (Grötlingbo)
- 10813 Mästerby (Mästerby)
- 10814 Gnisvärd (Gnisvärd)
- 10815 Östergarn (Östergarn)
- 11308 Tofta (Tofta)
- 11533 Akebäck (Akebäck)
- 12312 Väte (Väte)
- 12752 Kvarnis (Kvarngärdesskolan, a school in Uppsala)
- 13912 Gammelgarn (Gammelgarn)
- 23418 Malmbäck (Malmbäck)
- 36614 Saltis (Saltsjöbaden)

=== Slovakia ===
- 1259 Ógyalla (Hurbanovo)
- 1807 Slovakia (Slovakia)
- 1963 Bezovec (Mount Bezovec)
- 2315 Czechoslovakia (Czechoslovakia, now the Czech Republic and Slovakia)
- 2619 Skalnate Pleso (Skalnaté pleso Observatory)
- 3168 Lomnický Štít (Lomnický štít)
- 4018 Bratislava (Bratislava)
- 4573 Piešťany (Piešťany)
- 9543 Nitra (Nitra)
- 10207 Comeniana (Comenius University)
- 11118 Modra (Modra)
- 11614 Istropolitana (Universitas Istropolitana)
- 11636 Pezinok (Pezinok)
- 14509 Lučenec (Lučenec)
- 20664 Senec (Senec)
- 20495 Rimavská Sobota (Rimavská Sobota)
- 22185 Štiavnica (Banská Štiavnica)
- 22469 Poloniny (Poloniny Dark-Sky Park)
- 24260 Kriváň (Kriváň, a mountain)
- 25384 Partizánske (Partizánske)
- 26401 Sobotište (Sobotište)
- 27525 Vartovka (Vartovka, a hill)
- 38238 Holíč (Holíč)
- 59419 Prešov (Prešov)
- 67019 Hlohovec (Hlohovec)
- 121336 Žiarnadhronom (Žiar nad Hronom)
- 194262 Nové Zámky (Nové Zámky)
- 270556 Kolonica (Kolonica)
- 347028 Važec (Važec, a village in the district of Liptovský Mikuláš, Žilina Region)
- 376029 Blahová (Blahová, a municipality in Trnava)

=== Spain ===
- 804 Hispania (Spain)

==== Autonomous communities ====
- 1188 Gothlandia (Old name of Catalonia)
- 13868 Catalonia (Catalonia)
- 19776 Balears (Balearic Islands)
- 47096 Canarias (Canary Islands)
- 266465 Andalucia (Andalusia (Andalucia))
- 325366 Asturias (Asturias)

==== Cities, towns and villages ====
- 365 Corduba (Córdoba, Andalusia)
- 372 Palma (Palma de Mallorca, Balearic Islands)
- 945 Barcelona (Barcelona, Catalonia)
- 1159 Granada (Granada, Andalusia)
- 2189 Zaragoza (Zaragoza, Aragon)
- 2293 Guernica (Guernica, Basque Country)
- 3589 Loyola (Loyola, Basque Country)
- 4661 Yebes (Yebes, Castilla–La Mancha)
- 5227 Bocacara (Bocacara, Castile and León)
- 5229 Irurita (Irurita, Navarre)
- 5879 Almeria (Almería, Andalusia)
- 5941 Valencia (Valencia, Valencian Community)
- 9605 A Coruña (A Coruña, Galicia)
- 13260 Sabadell (Sabadell, Catalonia)
- 14097 Capdepera (Capdepera, Balearic Islands)
- 14967 Madrid (Madrid, Community of Madrid)
- 15884 Maspalomas (Maspalomas, Canary Islands)
- 20140 Costitx (Costitx, Balearic Islands)
- 53093 La Orotava (La Orotava, Canary Islands)
- 64553 Segorbe (Segorbe, Valencian Community)
- 68325 Begues (Begues, Catalonia)
- 71855 Incamajorca (Inca, Balearic Islands)
- 72037 Castelldefels (Castelldefels, Catalonia)
- 127870 Vigo (Vigo, Galicia)
- 164589 La Sagra (La Sagra, a comarca)
- 178383 Teruel (Teruel, Aragon)
- 185580 Andratx (Andratx, Mallorca)
- 209540 Siurana (Siurana, Catalonia)
- 228180 Puertollano (Puertollano, Castilla–La Mancha)
- 259387 Atauta (Atauta, Castile and León)
- 284029 Esplugafrancoli (L'Espluga de Francolí, Catalonia)
- 309706 Ávila (Ávila, Castile and León)
- 321024 Gijon (Gijón, Asturias)
- 325462 Felanitx (Felanitx, Balearic Islands)
- 352834 Málaga (Málaga, Andalusia)
- 367693 Montmagastrell (Santa Maria de Montmagastrell, Catalonia)
- 599755 Alcarràs (Alcarràs, Catalonia)
- 788890 Garafía (Garafía, Canary Islands)
- 798118 Todoque (Todoque, a ghost town in the Canary Islands)
- 884759 Compostela (Santiago de Compostela, Galicia)

==== Buildings ====
- 2857 NOT (Nordic Optical Telescope)
- 3851 Alhambra (Alhambra, World Heritage Site)
- 17494 Antaviana (Antaviana School in Barcelona)
- 37391 Ebre (Ebre Observatory)
- 96086 Toscanos (Los Toscanos)
- 99193 Obsfabra (Fabra Observatory in Barcelona)
- 159164 La Cañada (La Cañada Observatory)
- 185101 Balearicuni (University of the Balearic Islands)
- 187669 Obastromca (Astronomical Observatory of Mallorca)
- 189202 Calar Alto (Calar Alto Observatory)
- 847420 Livtel (Liverpool Telescope)

==== Natural features ====
- 1399 Teneriffa (Tenerife)
- 2912 Lapalma (La Palma, an island of the Canary Islands)
- 2946 Muchachos (Roque de los Muchachos)
- 7742 Altamira (Cave of Altamira)
- 9453 Mallorca (Mallorca, an island in the Balearic Islands)
- 27952 Atapuerca (Atapuerca Mountains)
- 35725 Tramuntana (Tramontane (Tramuntana), a mountain chain)
- 117874 Picodelteide (Mount Teide (Pico del Teide), a volcano in Canary Islands)
- 164589 La Sagra (La Sagra Mountain)
- 181419 Dragonera (Sa Dragonera, is an uninhabited islet in the Balearic Islands)
- 189848 Eivissa (the Catalan name for Ibiza, an island in the Balearic Islands)
- 196640 Mulhacén (Mulhacén, a mountain)
- 216295 Menorca (Menorca, an island in the Balearic Islands)
- 249160 Urriellu (Naranjo de Bulnes)
- 256796 Almanzor (Pico Almanzor)
- 263255 Jultayu (Jultayu Mountain, in Asturias)
- 263613 Enol (Lake Enol)
- 322390 Planes de Son (Les Planes de Son Plateau)
- 352760 Tesorero (Pico Tesorero, Picos de Europa)
- 353432 Cabrerabalears (Cabrera, an island in the Balearic Islands)
- 353595 Grancanaria (Gran Canaria, an island of the Canary Islands)
- 392225 Lanzarote (Lanzarote, a volcanic island, one of the seven Canary Islands)
- 579787 Formentera (Formentera, an island in the Balearic Islands)

=== Switzerland ===
- 113390 Helvetia (Helvetia, Latin name for Switzerland)
- 113415 Rauracia (Rauraci tribes)
- 227065 Romandia (Romandy, the French-speaking part of Switzerland)
- 249302 Ajoie (Ajoie, a historic region in the Jura Mountains)
- 282669 Erguël (Erguel, a seignory near Saint-Imier)

==== Regions (Cantons) ====
- 1687 Glarona (Glarus)
- 1768 Appenzella (Appenzell)
- 30798 Graubünden (Grisons)
- 42113 Jura (Jura)
- 47164 Ticino (Ticino)
- 242648 Fribourg (Fribourg)
- 858332 Grischun (Grisons)

==== Cities and villages ====
- 1313 Berna (Bern, capital of Switzerland)
- 1775 Zimmerwald (Zimmerwald)
- 1935 Lucerna (Lucerne)
- 1936 Lugano (Lugano)
- 1937 Locarno (Locarno)
- 1938 Lausanna (Lausanne)
- 2033 Basilea (Basilea, the old name of Basel)
- 13025 Zürich (Zürich)
- 43669 Winterthur (Winterthur, Zürich)
- 77755 Delémont (Delémont, Jura)
- 104896 Schwanden (Schwanden, Glarus)
- 269550 Chur (Chur, Grisons)

==== Municipalities ====
- 1304 Arosa (Arosa, Grisons)
- 1839 Ragazza (Bad Ragaz, St. Gallen)
- 3928 Randa (Randa, Valais)
- 43027 Minusio (Minusio, Ticino)
- 43028 Gnosca (Gnosca, Ticino)
- 84902 Porrentruy (Porrentruy, Jura)
- 88906 Moutier (Moutier, Jura)
- 129342 Ependes (Épendes, Sarine, Fribourg)
- 144096 Wiesendangen (Wiesendangen, Winterthur, Zürich)
- 183114 Vicques (Vicques, Delémont, Jura)
- 184508 Courroux (Courroux, Delémont, Jura)
- 212374 Vellerat (Vellerat, Delémont, Jura)
- 214432 Belprahon (Belprahon, Bernese Jura, Bern)
- 218752 Tentlingen (Tentlingen, Sense, Fribourg)
- 233943 Falera (Falera, Surselva, Graubünden)
- 251485 Bois-d'Amont (Bois-d'Amont, Sarine, Fribourg)
- 284945 Saint-Imier (Saint-Imier, Bernese Jura, Bern)
- 314040 Tavannes (Tavannes, Bernese Jura, Bern)
- 318412 Tramelan (Tramelan, Bernese Jura, Bern)

==== Natural features ====
- 2914 Glarnisch (Glärnisch)
- 3330 Gantrisch (Gantrisch)
- 5369 Virgiugum (Jungfraujoch)
- 19715 Basodino (Basòdino, a mountain)
- 23477 Wallenstadt (Walensee, a lake in St. Gallen)
- 207109 Stürmenchopf (Stürmenchopf, a mountain in the south of Laufen)
- 221712 Moleson (Moléson)
- 276781 Montchaibeux (Montchaibeux, a mountain in the Jura Mountains)
- 305254 Moron (Moron, a mountain)
- 331992 Chasseral (Chasseral, a mountain)
- 339486 Raimeux (Mont Raimeux, a mountain)
- 363582 Folpotat (Folpotat, a small river in an isolated Jura valley)

==== Buildings ====
- 6126 Hubelmatt (Hubelmatt Observatory)
- 75569 IRSOL (Istituto Ricerche Solari)
- 85199 Habsburg (Habsburg Castle)
- 88146 Castello (Castello Archaeological Site, Tremona)
- 157456 Pivatte (The discoverer's house, in Delémont)
- 175208 Vorbourg (Vorbourg castle ruins, Delémont)
- 224206 Pietchisson (Pietchisson Farmhouse)
- 232949 Muhina (Museum of Natural History, Fribourg)
- 318676 Bellelay (Bellelay Abbey)
- 398045 Vitudurum (Vitudurum)
- 418419 Lacanto (Lyceé Cantonal de Porrentruy)
- 541318 Mirasteilas (Mirasteilas Observatory)

=== Turkey ===
- 25 Phocaea (Foça)
- 110 Lydia (Lydia)
- 396 Aeolia (Aeolis)
- 887 Alinda (Alinda)
- 1174 Marmara (Sea of Marmara)
- 1457 Ankara (Ankara, capital of Turkey)
- 3286 Anatoliya (Anatolia)
- 3912 Troja (Troy)
- 20936 Nemrut Dagi (Nemrut, a volcano)
- 96205 Ararat (Mount Ararat)
- 294296 Efeso (Ephesus or Efesos)
- 345868 Halicarnassus (Mausoleum at Halicarnassus)
- 719840 Bilsemdüzce (Düzce Province, and BILSEMs)

=== United Kingdom ===
- 1071 Brita (Great Britain)
- 1244 Deira (Kingdom of Deira)
- 16083 Jórvík (Scandinavian York (Jórvík))

==== Counties ====
- 7603 Salopia (Shropshire)

==== Cities, towns and villages ====
- 758 Mancunia (Manchester)
- 2531 Cambridge (Cambridge)
- 3009 Coventry (Coventry)
- 3858 Dorchester (Dorchester)
- 5805 Glasgow (Glasgow)
- 6939 Lestone (Leighton Buzzard)
- 8283 Edinburgh (Edinburgh)
- 8380 Tooting (Tooting)
- 8837 London (London)
- 8849 Brighton (Brighton)
- 9767 Midsomer Norton (Midsomer Norton)
- 10501 Ardmacha (Irish Gaelic for Armagh)
- 11626 Church Stretton (Church Stretton)
- 28220 York (York)
- 181483 Ampleforth (Ampleforth)

==== Natural features ====
- 16481 Thames (Thames River)
- 96535 Schiehallion (Schiehallion)
- 100604 Lundy (Lundy, the largest island in the Bristol Channel)
- 129092 Snowdonia (Snowdon, the highest mountain in Wales)
- 394445 Unst (Unst, Shetland Islands, Scotland)

==== Buildings and structures ====
- 2830 Greenwich (Royal Observatory, Greenwich)
- 4206 Verulamium (Verulamium)
- 5677 Aberdonia (University of Aberdeen)
- 6229 Tursachan (Callanish Stones)
- 9325 Stonehenge (Stonehenge)
- 10502 Armaghobs (Armagh Observatory)
- 10515 Old Joe (Joseph Chamberlain Memorial Clock Tower)
- 69263 Big Ben (Big Ben, Westminster, the name of the great bell and clock tower)
- 69423 Openuni (Open University)

== North America ==
=== Canada ===
- 24899 Dominiona (Canada)
- 85168 Albertacentenary (Alberta)

==== Cities and municipalities ====
- 285 Regina (Regina, Saskatchewan)
- 4719 Burnaby (Burnaby, British Columbia)
- 6714 Montréal (Montreal, Québec)
- 11780 Thunder Bay (Thunder Bay, Ontario)
- 12310 Londontario (London, Ontario)
- 20031 Lakehead (Lakehead, the former name of Thunder Bay, Ontario)
- 35165 Québec (Quebec City, Québec)
- 96192 Calgary (Calgary, Alberta)
- 96193 Edmonton (Edmonton, Alberta)
- 176710 Banff (Banff, Alberta)
- 176711 Canmore (Canmore, Alberta)
- 223950 Mississauga (Mississauga, Ontario)
- 516560 Annapolisroyal (Annapolis Royal, Nova Scotia)
- 745492 Saanich (Saanich, British Columbia)

==== Buildings ====
- 4843 Mégantic (Mont Mégantic Observatory)
- 5457 Queen's (Queen's University at Kingston)
- 5547 Acadiau (Acadia University)
- 6898 Saint-Marys (Saint Mary's University, Halifax)
- 6904 McGill (McGill University)
- 12437 Westlane (Westlane Secondary School)
- 14424 Laval (Université Laval)
- 14724 SNO (Sudbury Neutrino Observatory)
- 14959 TRIUMF (TRIUMF)
- 15025 Uwontario (University of Western Ontario)
- 21375 Fanshawe (Fanshawe College)
- 99906 Uofalberta (University of Alberta)
- 150145 Uvic (University of Victoria)
- 383417 DAO (Dominion Astrophysical Observatory)
- 875129 Abbeyridgeobs (Abbey Ridge Observatory)
- 875150 Burkegaffneyobs (Burke-Gaffney Observatory)

==== Natural features ====
- 3307 Athabasca (Lake Athabasca)
- 22422 Kenmount Hill (Kenmount Hill, St. John's, Newfoundland and Labrador)
- 497593 Kejimkujik (Kejimkujik National Park, Nova Scotia)

==== First Nations ====
- 308825 Siksika (Siksika Nation)
- 402920 Tsawout (Tsawout First Nation)
- 611586 Tsartlip (Tsartlip First Nation)
- 611587 Tseycum (Tseycum First Nation)
- 611980 Pauquachin (Pauquachin First Nation)
- 616184 Malahat (Malahat First Nation)

=== United States ===
- 916 America (United States of America)

==== States ====
- 50 Virginia (Virginia)
- 341 California (California)
- 439 Ohio (Ohio)
- 793 Arizona (Arizona)
- 1602 Indiana (Indiana)
- 3124 Kansas (Kansas)
- 4547 Massachusetts (Massachusetts)
- 10195 Nebraska (Nebraska)
- 12344 Maryland (Maryland)
- 13688 Oklahoma (Oklahoma)
- 19148 Alaska (Alaska)
- 26715 South Dakota (South Dakota)
- 35352 Texas (Texas)
- 48575 Hawaii (Hawaii)
- 114703 North Dakota (North Dakota)
- 482101 Arizonacu (Arizona)
- 503033 New Hampshire (New Hampshire)

==== Counties ====
- 2939 Coconino (Coconino County, Arizona)
- 9238 Yavapai (Yavapai County, Arizona)
- 11678 Brevard (Brevard County, Florida)

==== Native reservations ====
- 2938 Hopi (Hopi Reservation)
- 3688 Navajo (Navajo Nation)

==== Cities and towns ====
- 334 Chicago (Chicago, Illinois)
- 484 Pittsburghia (Pittsburgh, Pennsylvania)
- 535 Montague (Montague, Massachusetts)
- 581 Tauntonia (Taunton, Massachusetts)
- 662 Newtonia (Newton, Massachusetts)
- 716 Berkeley (Berkeley, California)
- 740 Cantabia (Cambridge, Massachusetts)
- 747 Winchester (Winchester, Massachusetts)
- 757 Portlandia (Portland, Maine)
- 1249 Rutherfordia (Rutherford, New Jersey)
- 2118 Flagstaff (Flagstaff, Arizona)
- 2201 Oljato (Oljato-Monument Valley, Utah)
- 2224 Tucson (Tucson, Arizona)
- 2284 San Juan (San Juan, Puerto Rico)
- 2791 Paradise (Paradise, California)
- 2860 Pasacentennium (Pasadena, California)
- 3043 San Diego (San Diego, California)
- 3177 Chillicothe (Chillicothe, Ohio)
- 3512 Eriepa (Erie, Pennsylvania)
- 3583 Burdett (Burdett, Kansas)
- 3641 Williams Bay (Williams Bay, Wisconsin)
- 3711 Ellensburg (Ellensburg, Washington)
- 4825 Ventura (Ventura, California)
- 4871 Riverside (Riverside, California)
- 5653 Camarillo (Camarillo, California)
- 5870 Baltimore (Baltimore, Maryland)
- 6216 San Jose (San Jose, California)
- 6296 Cleveland (Cleveland, Ohio)
- 6854 Georgewest (George West, Texas)
- 7041 Nantucket (Nantucket, Massachusetts)
- 7259 Gaithersburg (Gaithersburg, Maryland)
- 7610 Sudbury (Sudbury, Massachusetts)
- 8084 Dallas (Dallas, Texas)
- 8489 Boulder (Boulder, Colorado)
- 10379 Lake Placid (Lake Placid, New York)
- 11739 Baton Rouge (Baton Rouge, Louisiana)
- 12464 Manhattan (Manhattan, New York City, New York)
- 12465 Perth Amboy (Perth Amboy, New Jersey)
- 12533 Edmond (Edmond, Oklahoma)
- 12912 Streator (Streator, Illinois)
- 13436 Enid (Enid, Oklahoma)
- 16669 Rionuevo (Rio Nuevo District, Tucson, Arizona)
- 18984 Olathe (Olathe, Kansas)
- 20437 Selohusa (South Euclid, Ohio and Lyndhurst, Ohio)
- 20898 Fountainhills (Fountain Hills, Arizona)
- 24779 Presque Isle (Presque Isle, Maine)
- 25890 Louisburg (Louisburg, Kansas)
- 26090 Monrovia (Monrovia, California)
- 32570 Peruindiana (Peru, Indiana)
- 34351 Decatur (Decatur, Alabama)
- 34419 Corning (Corning, New York)
- 34611 Nacogdoches (Nacogdoches, Texas)
- 35976 Yorktown (Yorktown, Virginia)
- 35977 Lexington (Lexington, Massachusetts)
- 35978 Arlington (Arlington, Massachusetts)
- 54439 Topeka (Topeka, Kansas)
- 58221 Boston (Boston, Massachusetts)
- 60186 Las Cruces (Las Cruces, New Mexico)
- 80180 Elko (Elko, Nevada)
- 82332 Las Vegas (Las Vegas, Nevada)
- 107561 Quinn (Quinn, South Dakota)
- 115492 Watonga (Watonga, Oklahoma)
- 123794 Deadwood (Deadwood, South Dakota)
- 143641 Sapello (Sapello, New Mexico)
- 157064 Sedona (Sedona, Arizona)
- 236129 Oysterbay (Oyster Bay, New York)
- 250774 Syosset (Syosset, New York)
- 284891 Kona (Kona District, Hawaii)
- 342204 Oak Cliff (Oak Cliff, Dallas, Texas)
- 342431 Hilo (Hilo, Hawaii)
- 397279 Bloomsburg (Bloomsburg, Pennsylvania)

==== Natural features ====
- 452 Hamiltonia (Mount Hamilton)
- 1103 Sequoia (Sequoia National Park)
- 1345 Potomac (Potomac River)
- 2322 Kitt Peak (Kitt Peak)
- 4182 Mount Locke (Mount Locke)
- 5445 Williwaw (Mount Williwaw)
- 6194 Denali (Denali)
- 6370 Malpais (Malpaís, a type of landform in the Southwest)
- 6917 Assateague (Assateague Island)
- 8223 Bradshaw (Bradshaw Mountains)
- 12079 Kaibab (Kaibab Limestone)
- 12382 Niagara Falls (Niagara Falls)
- 19204 Joshuatree (Joshua Tree National Park)
- 21651 Mission Valley (Mission Valley, San Diego)
- 49272 Bryce Canyon (Bryce Canyon National Park)
- 63387 Brazos Bend (Brazos Bend State Park)
- 84882 Table Mountain (Table Mountain)
- 159814 Saguaro (Saguaro National Park)
- 175166 Adirondack (Adirondack Astronomy Retreat)
- 214474 Long Island (Long Island)

==== Buildings ====
- 457 Alleghenia (Allegheny Observatory)
- 508 Princetonia (Princeton University)
- 516 Amherstia (Amherst College)
- 534 Nassovia (Nassau Hall)
- 620 Drakonia (Drake University)
- 691 Lehigh (Lehigh University)
- 694 Ekard (Drake University)
- 736 Harvard (Harvard University)
- 990 Yerkes (Yerkes Observatory)
- 991 McDonalda (McDonald Observatory)
- 1312 Vassar (Vassar College)
- 1420 Radcliffe (Radcliffe College)
- 1570 Brunonia (Brown University)
- 2253 Espinette (Espinette, a house in Williams Bay)
- 2322 Kitt Peak (Kitt Peak National Observatory)
- 2460 Mitlincoln (MIT Lincoln Laboratory)
- 2872 Gentelec (GTE Research Laboratories)
- 3773 Smithsonian (Smithsonian Astrophysical Observatory)
- 4299 WIYN (WIYN Observatory)
- 4337 Arecibo (Arecibo Observatory, Puerto Rico)
- 4432 McGraw-Hill (McGraw-Hill Telescope)
- 4433 Goldstone (Goldstone Deep Space Communications Complex)
- 4523 MIT (Massachusetts Institute of Technology)
- 4733 ORO (Oak Ridge Observatory)
- 5067 Occidental (Occidental College)
- 6151 Viget (Princeton University)
- 6891 Triconia (Tri-Con Barber Shop)
- 7158 IRTF (NASA Infrared Telescope Facility)
- 7806 Umasslowell (University of Massachusetts Lowell)
- 8250 Cornell (Cornell University)
- 10039 Keet Seel (Navajo National Monument)
- 10168 Stony Ridge (Stony Ridge Observatory)
- 10234 Sixtygarden (Harvard–Smithsonian Center for Astrophysics)
- 11998 Fermilab (Fermilab)
- 13830 ARLT (Automatic Radio-Linked Telescope)
- 15371 Steward (Steward Observatory)
- 17493 Wildcat (University of Arizona)
- 18368 Flandrau (Flandrau Science Center and Planetarium)
- 21651 Mission Valley (Mission Valley High School)
- 23989 Farpoint (Farpoint Observatory)
- 24778 Nemsu (New Mexico State University)
- 25164 Sonomastate (Sonoma State University)
- 27776 Cortland (State University of New York at Cortland)
- 52422 LPL (Lunar and Planetary Laboratory)
- 65688 Jarnac (Jarnac Observatory, Arizona)
- 66671 Sfasu (Stephen F. Austin State University)
- 69406 Martz-Kohl (Martz-Kohl Observatory, Frewsburg, New York)
- 73517 Cranbrook (Cranbrook Institute of Science)
- 75223 Wupatki (Wupatki National Monument)
- 77870 MOTESS (MOTESS)
- 78577 JPL (Jet Propulsion Laboratory)
- 87097 Lomaki (Lomaki Pueblo)
- 89264 Sewanee (Sewanee: The University of the South)
- 90022 Apache Point (Apache Point Observatory)
- 92685 Cordellorenz (Cordell–Lorenz Observatory)
- 115801 Punahou (Punahou School)
- 117430 Achosyx (Remote Astronomical Society Observatory of New Mexico's Rent-A-Scope Observatory)
- 132524 APL (Applied Physics Laboratory)
- 145475 Rehoboth (Rehoboth Christian School)
- 196481 VATT (Vatican Advanced Technology Telescope)
- 202806 Sierrastars (Sierra Stars Observatory)
- 218679 Sagamorehill (Sagamore Hill, New York)
- 231486 Capefearrock (Cape Fear High School)
- 269323 Madisonvillehigh (Madisonville High School)
- 391795 Univofutah (University of Utah)
- 392952 Hermitageshelter (Hermitage Cat Shelter)
- 542600 Lindahall (Linda Hall Library, Kansas City)

=== Mexico ===
- 10806 Mexico (Mexico)

==== States ====
- 10075 Campeche (Bay of Campeche and Campeche)
- 10799 Yucatán (Yucatán)
- 14217 Oaxaca (Oaxaca)

==== Cities ====
- 6349 Acapulco (Acapulco, Guerrero)
- 26857 Veracruz (Veracruz, Veracruz)

==== Buildings and ancient sites ====
- 12557 Caracol (El Caracol)
- 14674 INAOE (National Institute of Astrophysics, Optics and Electronics)
- 100456 Chichen Itza (Chichen Itza, a Pre-Columbian era Mayan city)
- 293477 Teotihuacan (Teotihuacan, an ancient Mesoamerican city)

==== Natural features ====
- 6035 Citlaltépetl (Citlaltépetl, a dormant volcano and the highest mountain (5636 m) in Mexico)
- 37471 Popocatepetl (Popocatépetl, an active volcano in Mexico)

=== Central America ===
- 1465 Autonoma (University of El Salvador)
- 10797 Guatemala (Guatemala)
- 11055 Honduras (Honduras)
- 11908 Nicaragua (Nicaragua)
- 117997 Irazu (Irazu, a volcano in Costa Rica)

=== Caribbean ===
- 739 Mandeville (Mandeville, Jamaica)
- 11094 Cuba (Cuba)
- 11095 Havana (Havana, Cuba)

== South America ==
=== Countries ===
- 8275 Inca (Former Inca Empire)
- 10071 Paraguay (Paraguay)
- 325558 Guyane (French Guiana)

=== Argentina ===
- 469 Argentina (Argentina)

==== Regions ====
- 2284 San Juan (San Juan Province)
- 3833 Calingasta (Calingasta Department)

==== Cities ====
- 1029 La Plata (La Plata, Buenos Aires)
- 7850 Buenos Aires (Buenos Aires, capital of Argentina)
- 14812 Rosario (Rosario, Santa Fe)
- 110295 Elcalafate (El Calafate, Santa Cruz)

==== Natural features ====
- 1821 Aconcagua (Aconcagua)
- 2311 El Leoncito (El Leoncito National Park)

==== Buildings ====
- 1917 Cuyo (National University of Cuyo)
- 3083 OAFA (Félix Aguilar Observatory)
- 3296 Bosque Alegre (Bosque Alegre Observatory)
- 3438 Inarradas (Argentine Institute of Radio Astronomy)
- 5387 Casleo (Leoncito Astronomical Complex)
- 7626 Iafe (Institute of Astronomy and Space Physics)

=== Brazil ===
- 293 Brasilia (Brazil)

==== States ====
- 10769 Minas Gerais (Minas Gerais)

==== Cities and districts ====
- 10468 Itacuruba (Itacuruba, Pernambuco)
- 10770 Belo Horizonte (Belo Horizonte, Minas Gerais)
- 10771 Ouro Prêto (Ouro Preto, Minas Gerais)
- 11334 Rio de Janeiro (Rio de Janeiro, Rio de Janeiro)
- 12367 Ourinhos (Ourinhos, São Paulo)
- 16198 Búzios (Armação dos Búzios, Rio de Janeiro)
- 29160 São Paulo (São Paulo, São Paulo)
- 79864 Pirituba (Pirituba, São Paulo)
- 792972 Teresina (Teresina, Piauí)

==== Natural features ====
- 1042 Amazone (Amazon River)
- 1684 Iguassú (Iguazu Falls)
- 1779 Paraná (Paraná River)
- 11912 Piedade (Serra da Piedade, in Minas Gerais)

==== Buildings ====
- 2707 Ueferji (Federal University of Rio de Janeiro)
- 32400 Itaparica (Sertão de Itaparica Astronomical Observatory)

=== Bolivia ===
- 1008 La Paz (La Paz)
- 12376 Cochabamba (Cochabamba)
- 13037 Potosi (Potosí)
- 31031 Altiplano (Altiplano, crossing Peru, Bolivia and Chile)
- 32987 Uyuni (Salar de Uyuni, the largest salty expanse on the planet, located in Bolivia)

=== Chile ===
- 4636 Chile (Chile)

==== Provinces ====
- 3495 Colchagua (Colchagua Province)

==== Cities ====
- 7082 La Serena (La Serena)
- 10454 Vallenar (Vallenar)
- 11335 Santiago (Santiago)
- 18745 San Pedro (San Pedro de Atacama)
- 19137 Copiapó (Copiapó)
- 55737 Coquimbo (Coquimbo)
- 257533 Iquique (Iquique)

==== Natural features ====
- 6836 Paranal (Cerro Paranal)
- 13126 Calbuco (Calbuco Volcano)
- 18725 Atacama (Atacama Desert)
- 90713 Chajnantor (Chajnantor Plateau)
- 129555 Armazones (Cerro Armazones)

==== Buildings ====
- 2187 La Silla (La Silla Observatory)
- 2326 Tololo (Cerro Tololo Inter-American Observatory)
- 3496 Arieso (Astronomical Calculation Institute and European Southern Observatory)
- 3705 Hotellasilla (La Silla Observatory's hotel)
- 8210 NANTEN (NANTEN2 Observatory)

=== Colombia ===
- 12325 Bogota (Bogotá)
- 22195 Nevadodelruiz (Nevado del Ruiz Mountain)
- 79889 Maloka (Maloka Interactive Center, Bogotá)
- 366272 Medellín (Medellín)
- 423624 Udeantioquia (University of Antioquia)

=== Ecuador ===
- 10792 Ecuador (Ecuador)
- 10793 Quito (Quito)
- 13509 Guayaquil (Guayaquil)
- 16809 Galápagos (Galápagos Islands)
- 26027 Cotopaxi (Cotopaxi, an active stratovolcano in the Andes Mountains)
- 30797 Chimborazo (Chimborazo)
- 48451 Pichincha (Mount Pichincha)

=== Peru ===
- 737 Arequipa (Arequipa)
- 1801 Titicaca (Lake Titicaca)
- 8277 Machu-Picchu (Machu Picchu)
- 8279 Cuzco (Cuzco)
- 10866 Peru (Peru)
- 10867 Lima (Lima)
- 37596 Cotahuasi (Cotahuasi Canyon)

=== Uruguay ===
- 6252 Montevideo (Montevideo)
- 10072 Uruguay (Uruguay)
- 10476 Los Molinos (Los Molinos Observatory)

=== Venezuela ===
- 9357 Venezuela (Venezuela)

==== Cities ====
- 10344 Llanodelhato (Llano del Hato)
- 11083 Caracas (Caracas)
- 11193 Mérida (Mérida)
- 12758 Kabudari (Palavecino Municipality)
- 78816 Caripito (Caripito)
- 128166 Carora (Carora)

==== Buildings ====
- 12360 Unilandes (University of the Andes)

==== Natural features ====
- 11926 Orinoco (Orinoco River)

== Oceania ==
- 224 Oceana (Pacific Ocean)
- 235 Carolina (Caroline Island, Kiribati)
- 2218 Wotho (Wotho Atoll)
- 14012 Amedee (Amedee Island, Nouméa, New Caledonia)
- 221465 Rapa Nui (Rapa Nui, the name of Easter Island in the Polynesian Rapanui language)
- 570814 Nauru (Nauru)

=== Australia ===
- 2343 Siding Spring (Siding Spring Observatory)
- 2618 Coonabarabran (Coonabarabran)
- 3953 Perth (Perth)
- 4128 UKSTU (UK Schmidt Telescope)
- 4620 Bickley (Bickley)
- 5277 Brisbane (Brisbane)
- 8088 Australia (Australia)
- 9090 Chirotenmondai (Chiro Astronomical Observatory)
- 9485 Uluru (Uluru)
- 10078 Stanthorpe (Stanthorpe)
- 11195 Woomera (Woomera)
- 11304 Cowra (Cowra)
- 11927 Mount Kent (Mount Kent Observatory)
- 13933 Charleville (Charleville)
- 15550 Sydney (Sydney)
- 15723 Girraween (Girraween National Park)
- 17640 Mount Stromlo (Mount Stromlo Observatory)
- 217603 Grove Creek (Grove Creek Observatory)
- 336698 Melbourne (Melbourne)

=== New Zealand ===
- 3400 Aotearoa (Aotearoa)
- 3563 Canterbury (Canterbury Region)
- 3810 Aoraki (Aoraki / Mount Cook)
- 19620 Auckland (Auckland)
- 23988 Maungakiekie (Maungakiekie / One Tree Hill)
- 29186 Lake Tekapo (Lake Tekapo)
- 101461 Dunedin (Dunedin)
- 386622 New Zealand (New Zealand)
- 507490 Possum (Possum Observatory)

=== French Polynesia ===
- 40227 Tahiti (Tahiti, the largest island in French Polynesia)
- 81203 Polynesia (French Polynesia)
- 88292 Bora-Bora (Bora Bora Island, northwest of Tahiti)
- 145558 Raiatea (Raiatea Island, French Polynesia)

=== Hawaii ===
- 7158 IRTF (NASA Infrared Telescope Facility)
- 8721 AMOS (Air Force Maui Optical and Supercomputing)
- 14764 Kilauea (Kīlauea, an active volcano on the island of Hawaiʻi)
- 34901 Mauna Loa (Mauna Loa, the volcano forms the largest part of the Big Island of Hawaii)
- 48575 Hawaii (Hawaii)
- 115801 Punahou (Punahou School)
- 123290 Manoa (Mānoa, Hawaii)
- 171183 Haleakala (Haleakalā, volcano on the island of Maui)
- 188534 Mauna Kea (Mauna Kea, volcano on the island of Hawaii)
- 284891 Kona (Kona District, Hawaii)
- 342431 Hilo (Hilo, Hawaii)
- 563197 ʻIke Leʻa (ʻIke Leʻa Building, University of Hawaiʻi Maui College)
- 870437 Leilani (Leilani Estates, Hawaii)

== Polar regions ==
- 1031 Arctica (The Arctic)
- 2404 Antarctica (Antarctica)
- 10325 Bexa (Iceberg B-10A)
- 110298 Deceptionisland (Deception Island, a volcano in Antarctica)

== Fictional places ==
- 44 Nysa (Nysa)
- 279 Thule (Thule)
- 1198 Atlantis (Atlantis)
- 1282 Utopia (Utopia)
- 1309 Hyperborea (Hyperborea)
- 1819 Laputa (Laputa)
- 2564 Kayala (Kayala River, from The Tale of Igor's Campaign)
- 2952 Lilliputia (Lilliput)
- 2998 Berendeya (Berendeya, a place in The Snow Maiden)
- 3606 Pohjola (Pohjola)
- 4188 Kitezh (Kitezh)
- 5405 Neverland (Neverland)
- 9500 Camelot (Camelot)
- 10831 Takamagahara (Takamagahara)
- 11553 Scheria (Scheria, which is likely based on Corfu)
- 12374 Rakhat (Rakhat, a planet in The Sparrow)
- 46610 Bésixdouze (B 612, a fictional asteroid in The Little Prince)
- 113405 Itomori (Itomori)
- 152341 Rupesnigra (Rupes Nigra)
- 155142 Tenagra (Tenagra, an island in Star Trek)
- 221230 Sanaloria (Sanaloria, a fictional planet created by the discoverer's son)
- 256797 Benbow (Admiral Benbow Inn)
- 278141 Tatooine (Tatooine)
- 719612 Hoshizaki (Hoshizaki High School)

== See also ==
- List of minor planets
- List of minor planets named after people
- List of minor planets named after rivers
- Meanings of minor planet names
