= List of North Carolina state agencies =

This is a list of official agencies of the U.S. state of North Carolina. It includes state government departments, divisions, commissions, boards, and programs, as well as public-private partnerships and regional commissions and boards to which it is officially a party.

In general, the list is guided by the website North Carolina State Organizations A to Z, including those at the link Board and Commission Profiles.

Differences from the state lists:

- The individual North Carolina Community Colleges are not listed separately here, as are all included in their own Category: North Carolina Community System colleges.
- Departments led by members of the Council of State rather than the members positions.
- This list includes agencies with Wikipedia pages or items that do not appear on the state list, such as agencies that have closed.
- The North Carolina General Assembly and its parts are not included.
- Some boards and commissions have been combined with closely related agencies to create a single list entry.

== Numeric ==
- 911 Board

== A ==
- Access to Sound Basic Education
- Achieving a Better Life Experience (ABLE)
- Acupuncture Licensing Board
- Addictions Specialist Professional Practice
- Administration, Department of
- Administrative Hearings, Office of
- Administrative Office of the Courts
- Adult Correction, Department of
- Advanced Energy
- African American Heritage Commission
- Aging and Adult Services, Division of
- Aging, Governor`s Advisory Council on
- Agricultural Development & Farmland Preservation
- Agricultural Finance Authority
- Agricultural Hall of Fame
- Agriculture and Consumer Services, Department of
- Agriculture and Forestry Awareness
- Agriculture, North Carolina State Board
- Air Quality, Division of
- Alarm Systems Licensing Board
- Alcohol and Chemical Dependency, Division of
- Alcohol Law Enforcement
- Alcoholic Beverage Control Commission
- Andrea Harris Equity Task Force
- Appraisal Board
- Arboretum, Board of Directors
- Archaeology, State Office of
- Architecture and Registered Interior Designers, North Carolina Board of
- Archives and History, Office of NC
- Archives of North Carolina, State
- Art Museums, Division of State
- Arts Council
- Athletic Trainer Examiners
- Atlantic States Marine Fisheries Commission
- Auctioneers Commission
- Aviation
- Awards Committee

== B ==
- Bald Head Island Transportation Authority
- Banking Commission
- Bar Council
- Barber and Electrolysis Examiners
- Behavior Analysis Board
- Bicycle/Pedestrian
- Biotechnology Center
- Blind, Commission for the
- Blind, Division of Services for the
- Blue Ridge National Heritage
- Boxing and Combat Sports Commission
- Brain Injury Advisory Council
- Budget and Management, Office of State
- Building Code Council
- Building Commission
- Business Registration Division

== C ==
- Campaign Finance Division
- Cancer Coordination and Control
- Cape Fear Navigation & Pilotage
- Capital Facilities Finance Agency
- Capitol Area Visitors Services
- Catawba/Wateree River Basin Advisory Commission
- Cemetery Commission
- Certified Public Accountant Examiners
- Cherokee Preservation Foundation
- Chief Information Officer office
- Child Care Commission
- Child Development and Early Education, Division of
- Child Fatality Prevention Team
- Child Fatality Task Force
- Child Protection Services
- Child Support Services
- Child Well Being Transformation Council
- Children With Special Health Care Needs
- Chiropractic Examiners
- Civil Air Patrol
- Civil Rights Division
- Coastal Management Division
- Coastal Resources Commission
- Code Officials Qualification Board
- College Foundation, Board of Trustees
- Commerce, Department of
- Commissioner of Banks, see Banking Commission
- Community College System Office
- Community Supervision
- Constituent Services
- Construction, Office of State
- Consumer and Family Advisory Committee
- Consumer Protection Division
- Controller, Office of the State
- Correction Enterprises
- Cosmetic Art Examiners
- Council for Women
- County Boards of Elections
- Courts Commission
- Credit Union Division
- Credit Union Division Commission
- Crime Commission, Governor's
- Crime Victims Compensation Commission
- Criminal Justice Education and Training Standards Commission
- Criminal Justice Information Network

== D ==
- Deaf and Hard of Hearing, Council for the
- Deaf and Hard of Hearing Services, Division of
- Dental Examiners
- Developmental Disabilities, Council on
- Dietetics/Nutrition
- Disciplinary Hearing Commission
- Dispute Resolution Commission
- Domestic Violence
- DRIVE Task Force to Develop a Representative and Inclusive Vision for Education

== E ==
- Economic Development Partnership
- Edenton Historical Commission
- Education and Workforce Commission
- Education Assistance Authority
- Education Commission of the States
- Education, State Board of
- Educational Services for Exceptional Children
- Elections, North Carolina State Board of
- Electrical Contractors, State Board of
- Emergency Management Division
- Emergency Response Commission
- Employee Misclassification
- Employment Security Board of Review
- Employment Security, Division of
- Energy Policy Council
- Energy Program
- Energy, Mineral and Land Resources, Division of
- Engineers and Surveyors Board
- Entrepreneurial Council
- Environmental Assistance and Customer Service
- Environmental Health
- Environmental Health Specialist Examiner
- Environmental Justice Advisory Council
- Environmental Management Commission
- Environmental Quality, Department of
- Equal Access to Justice
- Ethics Commission
- Eugenics Board of North Carolina
- Executive Mansion Fine Arts Committee
- Executive Mansion Fund, Inc. Board of Directors

== F ==
- Federal Surplus Property
- Fee-Based Practicing Pastoral Counselors, State Board of Examiners of
- Ferry Division
- Film Office
- Film, Television and Digital Streaming
- Financial Literacy Council
- Fire and Rescue Commission
- Fire Marshal, Office of State
- Food and Drug Protection Division
- Food Distribution Division
- Forest Service
- Foresters, State Board of Registration
- Forestry Advisory Council
- Funeral Service

== G ==
- Gasoline and Oil Inspection Board
- General Assembly Police
- General Contractors State Licensing Board
- General Statutes Commission
- Geographic Information and Analysis, Center for
- Geographic Information Coordinating Council
- Geologists, North Carolina Board
- Global TransPark
- Global Transpark Authority
- GoGlobalNC
- Golden LEAF Foundation
- Government Data Analytics Center
- Governor Morehead School
- Grievance Resolution Board

== H ==
- Health and Human Services, Department of
- Health Benefits (Medicaid), Division of
- Health Care Information and Communications Alliance (NCHICA)
- Health Service Regulation, Division of
- Hearing Aid Dealers and Fitters
- Hearings Division
- Heart Disease and Stroke Prevention
- Highway Patrol
- Highways Division
- Highway Safety Program, Governor's
- Hispanic/Latino Affairs Advisory Council
- Historic Bath Commission
- Historic Hillsborough Commission
- Historic Murfreesboro Commission
- Historic Preservation, State Office of
- Historic Sites, NC Division of State
- Historical Commission
- Historical Publications
- Historical Records Advisory Board
- Historically Underutilized Businesses (HUB)
- History Museums, Division of State
- Holocaust Council
- Home Inspectors Licensure Board
- Housing Finance Agency Board of Directors, North Carolina
- Housing Finance Agency of North Carolina
- Human Relations Commission
- Human Resources
- Human Trafficking Commission
- Humanities Council

== I ==
- Impaired Driving Task Force
- Indian Affairs, Commission of
- Indian Housing Authority
- Indigent Defense Services Commission
- Industrial Commission
- Industrial Hemp
- Information Technology, Department of
- Innocence Inquiry
- Innovation Council
- Institute of Medicine
- Division of Institutions
- Insurance, Department of
- Integrated Mobility Division
- Interagency Coordinating Council (ICC) for Children from Birth to Five with Disabilities
- Interagency Council for Coordinating (ICC) Homeless Programs
- Internship Council
- Interpreter and Transliterator Licensing
- Interstate Adult Offender Supervision
- Interstate Compact on Educational Opportunity for Military Children
- Interstate High-Speed Rail Compact
- Interstate Juvenile Supervision
- Interstate Mining Commission
- Interstate Oil & Gas
- Irrigation Contractors` Licensing Board

== J ==
- Judicial Standards Commission
- Justice for Sterilization Victims Foundation
- Justice, Department of
- Juvenile Court Services
- Juvenile Jurisdiction Advisory Committee
- Juvenile Justice and Delinquency Prevention, Department of
- Juvenile Justice Planning Committee

== L ==
- Labor and Economic Analysis Division
- Labor, Department of
- Land and Water Fund
- Landscape Architects, North Carolina Board
- Landscape Contractors' Licensing Board
- Legislative Bill Drafting Division
- Library Commission
- Library of North Carolina, State
- License to Give Trust Fund
- Licensed Clinical Mental Health Counselors
- Local Government Commission
- Local Governmental Employees Retirement System (LGERS)
- Locksmith Licensing
- Lottery Commission (NC Education Lottery)

== M ==
- Mail Service Center
- Manufactured Housing Board
- Marine Fisheries Commission
- Marine Fisheries Division
- Marine Industrial Park Authority
- Marriage and Family Therapy Licensure
- Massage and Bodywork Therapy, Board of
- Medical Board
- Medical Care Commission
- Mental Health, Developmental Disabilities and Substance Abuse Services Division
- Mental Health, Developmental Disabilities and Substance Abuse Services, Commission for
- Microelectronics Center of North Carolina (MCNC)
- Mid-Atlantic Fishery Management Council
- Military Affairs Commission
- Military and Veterans Affairs, Department of
- Mining Commission
- Minority Health Advisory Council
- Mitigation Services, Division of
- MLK Jr. Commission
- Morehead City Navigation and Pilotage
- Motor Fleet Management
- Motor Vehicles Division
- Motorsports
- Museum of Art, North Carolina Board
- Museum of History Associates
- myFutureNC

== N ==
- National Guard
- Natural and Cultural Resources, Department of
- Natural Sciences Museum
- NCThinks
- NCWorks Commission
- Non-Public Education Office
- North Carolina South Carolina Boundary
- Notary Public Division
- Nursing Home Administrators
- Nursing, North Carolina Board of

== O ==
- Occupational Safety & Health Review
- Occupational Safety and Health
- Occupational Therapy
- Oil and Gas Commission
- On-Site Wastewater
- Opticians, North Carolina State Board of
- Optometry Examiners

== P ==
- Parking Division, State
- Parks and Recreation Authority
- Parks and Recreation, Division of
- Parks and Recreation Trust Fund
- PBS North Carolina
- Performance Management Committee
- Perfusion Advisory Committee
- Permanency Innovation Committee
- Pesticide Board
- Pharmacy, North Carolina Board of
- Physical Therapy Examiners
- Plant Conservation Board
- Plumbing, Heating and Fire Sprinkler Contractors
- Podiatry Examiners
- Poet Laureate
- Ports Authority Board of Directors
- Ports Authority Division
- Post-Release Supervision and Parole Commission
- Principal Fellows Commission
- Private Protective Services Board
- Property Tax Commission, State
- Property, Office of State
- Proprietary Schools
- Psychology Board
- Public Health, Commission for
- Public Health, Division of
- Public Instruction, Department of
- Public Librarian Certification
- Public Safety, Department of
- Public School Forum
- Public Transportation
- Purchase and Contract Division

== R ==
- Racial Equity in Criminal Justice, Task Force for
- Radiation Protection
- Rail Division
- Railroad Board of Directors
- Rate Bureau
- Real Estate Commission
- Recreational Therapy Licensure
- Refrigeration Contractors
- Reinsurance Facility
- Respiratory Care Board
- Retirement Systems Division
- Revenue, Department of
- Roanoke Island Commission
- Roanoke Island Historical Association
- Roanoke River Basin Bi-State Commission
- Rules Division, Office of Administrative Hearings
- Rules Review Commission
- Rural Economic Development Division
- Rural Electrification Authority
- Rural Health, Office
- Rural Infrastructure Authority

== S ==
- Safer Schools, Center for
- Safer Schools, Task Force for
- Safety and Emission Vehicle Inspection
- Safety and Health Review Commission
- Science, Technology & Innovation, Office of
- Science, Technology, and Innovation Board
- Securities Division
- Sedimentation Control Commission
- Selective Service System
- Sentencing and Policy Advisory
- Sheriffs Education and Training
- Sickle Cell Syndrome
- Small Business Technical Development Center
- Smart Start / Partnership for Children
- Social Services Commission
- Social Services, Division of
- Social Work Certification
- Soil and Water Conservation Commission
- Soil and Water Conservation Division
- Soil Scientists Licensing Board
- South Atlantic Fishery Management Council
- Southern Region Educational Board Legislative Advisory Council
- Southern Regional Education Board
- Speech-Language Pathologists and Audiologists
- State Auditor, Office of
- State Bureau of Investigation
- State Capitol Police
- State, Department of
- State Center for Health Statistics
- State Environmental Review Clearinghouse
- State Health Coordinating Council (SHCC)
- State Health Plan
- State Human Resources, Office of
- State Surplus Property
- State Total Retirement Plan
- State Water Infrastructure Authority
- Statewide Independent Living Council (SILC)
- Structural Pest Control Committee
- Substance Abuse/Underage Drinking
- Supplemental Retirement
- Symphony Society Board of Trustees
- Symphony

== T ==
- Tax Information Management System (TIMS) Oversight Committee
- Teacher Advisory Committee
- Teachers` and State Employees` Retirement System (TSERS) Board
- Teaching, Center for the Advancement of
- Temporary Solutions
- Textbook Commission
- Tobacco Trust Fund
- Transportation, Board of
- Transportation, Department of
- Travel and Tourism Board
- Treasurer, Department of State
- Tribal Indian Gaming Compact
- Tryon Palace Commission
- Turnpike Authority
- Turnpike Division
- TVA Regional Energy Resource Council

== U ==
- U.S.S. North Carolina Battleship
- Umstead Act Unfair Competition Panel
- Underground Damage Prevention Review Board
- Uniform Commercial Code Division
- University Governance
- University of North Carolina Board of Governors
- University of North Carolina System
- Utilities Commission
- Utilities Commission Public Staff

== V ==
- Veterans Affairs
- Veterans Working Group
- Veterinary Medical Board
- Victim Compensation Services
- Vital Records, Office of
- Vocational Rehabilitation Services
- Vocational State Rehabilitation
- Volunteerism & Community Service

== W ==
- Waste Management
- Water Infrastructure, Division for
- Water Resources, Division of
- Water Treatment Certification Board
- Well Contractors Certification
- Western NC Public Lands Council
- Western Residence Board of Directors
- Wildlife Resources Commission
- Women and Youth, Division for
- Women, Infant and Community Wellness Section
- Workforce Solutions, Division of

== Y ==
- Youth Advisory Council
- Youth Outdoor Engagement Commission

== Z ==
- Zoological Park Council
