= Capitol police =

Guard service for a legislature

Capitol police in the United States are agencies charged with the provision of security police services for various state agencies, but especially state legislatures. Capitol police may function as part of the state police or may be an independent agency. There is also a federal capitol police agency.

Security police for government facilities are a very old idea, dating back at least to the guards posted at Solomon's temple and including such units as the Praetorian Guard and the Coldstream Guards.

== United States Capitol Police ==
The United States Capitol Police is the agency charged with the protection of the United States Capitol and some surrounding buildings, including the Library of Congress.

== State capitol police agencies ==
This table sorts police forces into:

- independent agencies, where they report directly to the legislature (and not the executive branch of the state government)
- operational units of the state government, where they form part of another state agency (often the Department of Public Safety)
- operational units of the state police, where the capitol security function is provided by a dedicated unit that is part of the state police/highway patrol

Capitol police forces
State	Name	Status	Parent agency	Notes
Alabama	Capitol Patrol Unit	Operational unit of the state police	Alabama Law Enforcement Agency, Protective Services	
Alaska	Legislative Security	Independent agency	Legislative Affairs Agency	
Arizona	Legislative Security	Operational unit of the state police	Arizona Department of Public Safety	Arizona State Capitol Police merged with the Department of Public Safety in 2011
Arkansas	Arkansas State Capitol Police	Operational unit of the state government	Arkansas Secretary of State	
California	Capitol Protection Section	Operational unit of the state police	California Highway Patrol	California State Police merged with the California Highway Patrol in 1995
Colorado	Executive Security Branch	Operational unit of the state police	Colorado State Patrol	
Connecticut	Connecticut State Capitol Police	Independent agency	Connecticut General Assembly	
Delaware	Delaware Capitol Police	Operational unit of the state government	Delaware Department of Safety and Homeland Security	
Florida	Florida Capitol Police	Operational unit of the state government	Florida Department of Law Enforcement	
Georgia	Capitol Police Services Unit	Operational unit of the state government	Georgia Department of Public Safety	
Hawaii	Capitol Section	Operational unit of the state police	Hawaii Department of Public Safety, Sheriff Division	
Idaho	Capitol Mall Security	Operational unit of the state government	Idaho Department of Administration, Capitol Mall Services	
Illinois	Illinois State Capitol Police	Operational unit of the state government	Illinois Secretary of State	
Indiana	Capitol Police Section	Operational unit of the state police	Indiana State Police	
Iowa	Iowa State Patrol, District 16	Operational unit of the state police	Iowa State Patrol	Iowa Capitol Police merged with Iowa State Patrol in 2000
Kansas	Kansas Highway Patrol, Troop K	Operational unit of the state police	Kansas Highway Patrol	
Kentucky	Division of Facilities Security	Operational unit of the state police	Kentucky State Police	
Louisiana	Capitol Detail, DPS Police	Operational unit of the state police	Louisiana State Police	
Maine	Maine Bureau of Capitol Police	Operational unit of the state police	Maine State Police	From 2025, the Capitol Police are merging with the State Police
Maryland	Maryland Capitol Police	Operational unit of the state government	Maryland Department of General Services	
Massachusetts	Massachusetts State Police	Operational unit of the state police	Massachusetts State Police	Massachusetts Capitol Police merged into the Massachusetts State Police in 1992
Michigan	Capitol Security Section	Operational unit of the state police	Michigan State Police	
Minnesota	Capitol Security	Operational unit of the state police	Minnesota State Patrol	
Mississippi	Office of Capitol Police	Operational unit of the state government	Mississippi Department of Public Safety	
Missouri	Missouri Capitol Police	Operational unit of the state government	Missouri Department of Public Safety	
Montana	Montana Highway Patrol	Operational unit of the state police	Montana Highway Patrol	
Nebraska	State Capitol Security Division	Operational unit of the state police	Nebraska State Patrol	
Nevada	Nevada Capitol Police police the buildings used by the executive branch	Operational unit of the state government	Nevada Department of Public Safety	
Nevada	Nevada State Legislative Police police State Legislature when in session	Independent agency	Nevada Legislature	
New Hampshire	State House Security Unit	Operational unit of the state police	New Hampshire Division of State Police	
New Jersey	Statehouse Complex Security Unit	Operational unit of the state police	Office of State Governmental Security, New Jersey State Police	
New York	New York State Police	Operational unit of the state police	Parent agency	New York State Capital Police merged with the New York State Police in 1997
New Mexico	Legislative Detail	Operational unit of the state police	New Mexico State Police	
North Carolina	North Carolina State Capitol Police police the North Carolina State Capitol building, now used by the executive branch	Operational unit of the state government	North Carolina Department of Public Safety	
North Carolina	North Carolina General Assembly Police police the North Carolina State Legislative Building building	Independent agency	North Carolina General Assembly	
North Dakota	Capitol Security	Operational unit of the state police	North Dakota Highway Patrol	
Ohio	Capitol Operations Unit	Operational unit of the state police	Ohio State Highway Patrol	
Oklahoma	Capitol Patrol Section	Operational unit of the state police	Oklahoma Highway Patrol	
Oregon	Oregon State Police	Operational unit of the state police	Oregon State Police	
Pennsylvania	Pennsylvania Capitol Police	Operational unit of the state government	Pennsylvania Department of General Services	
Rhode Island	Rhode Island Capitol Police	Operational unit of the state government	Rhode Island Department of Public Safety	
South Carolina	State House Patrol Division	Operational unit of the state government	South Carolina Department of Public Safety, Bureau of Protective Services	
South Dakota	South Dakota Highway Patrol	Operational unit of the state police	South Dakota Highway Patrol	
Tennessee	Capitol Protection Unit	Operational unit of the state police	Protective Services and Special Programs Bureau, Tennessee Highway Patrol	
Texas	Capitol Detail	Operational unit of the state police	Texas Highway Patrol	Capitol Security Police Division of the State Purchasing and General Services Commission merged with the Texas Department of Public Safety in 1991
Utah	Utah Highway Patrol	Operational unit of the state police	Utah Highway Patrol	
Vermont	Vermont Capitol Police Department	Independent agency	Vermont State Legislature	
Virginia	Virginia Capitol Police	Independent agency	Virginia General Assembly	
Washington	Capitol Campus Detachment	Operational unit of the state police	Washington State Patrol	
West Virginia	West Virginia Division of Protective Services (Capitol Police)	Operational unit of the state government	West Virginia Department of Homeland Security	
Wisconsin	Wisconsin Capitol Police	Operational unit of the state government	Wisconsin Department of Administration	
Wyoming	Executive Protection Detail	Operational unit of the state police	Wyoming Highway Patrol	

== See also ==
- Public safety department

=== In other countries ===
- Republican Guard (France)
- German Parliament Police
- Ontario Legislative Security Service
- Parliamentary Protective Service, Canada
- Eishi (Serjeant-at-arms), Japan
