= North Carolina State Capitol Police =

Agency overview
- Formed: 1967
- Employees: 141

Jurisdictional structure
- Operations jurisdiction: North Carolina, U.S.
- Legal jurisdiction: Raleigh, North Carolina
- General nature: Civilian police

Operational structure
- Headquarters: 417 N. Salisbury St., Raleigh, North Carolina
- Agency executive: Roger Hawley, Chief
- Parent agency: Department of Public Safety

Website
- www.ncdps.gov/Our-Organization/Law-Enforcement/State-Capitol-Police/Mission-State-Capitol-Police

The North Carolina State Capitol Police is a capitol police force responsible for policing North Carolina state government buildings in Wake County, North Carolina. Officers have the same jurisdiction as a Raleigh police officer would have within the city limits. They also have jurisdiction on state property statewide. The force is part of the North Carolina Department of Public Safety. The force does not police the buildings of the North Carolina General Assembly, which is the responsibility of the separate North Carolina General Assembly Police.

== History ==
The force was formed by the North Carolina General Assembly on 13 August 1967, in response to a spate of thefts and incidents of vandalism at state government buildings in Raleigh, the state capital.

The new force originally started with a budget of $34,704 per year, and had seven officers under the command of Chief Ray Sorrell, who had previously been the police chief in Garner, North Carolina. The primary responsibilities of the force were to patrol state government facilities in Raleigh and to supervise the operation and security of state government parking lots.

Prior to the formation of the State Capitol Police, the state relied on a force of security guards who provided security outside business hours. After the State Capitol Police Force was created, 18 security guards remained a part of the force, and provided a security presence when the uniformed police officers were not on duty.

The force was originally part of the General Services Division of the Department of Administration, and the headquarters were in the East Administration Building on East Jones Street, Raleigh.

== Operations ==
Commanded by State Capitol Police Chief R.E. "Chip" Hawley, the force currently provides a range of services, including escorting high-value cash movements, criminal investigations and surveillance through the Criminal Investigations Unit, crowd management through the Civil Disturbance Team, emergency telecommunications, including alarm and surveillance monitoring, and parking enforcement.

In 2011, the force was reorganised, and had 40 sworn officers, 18 non-sworn security guards, and three civilian staff. The annual budget was $1,447,696.

== See also ==
- Capitol police
- List of law enforcement agencies in North Carolina
- North Carolina General Assembly Police
