= North Carolina State Board of Dental Examiners =

Agency of the government of North Carolina

Agency overview
- Jurisdiction: State of North Carolina
- Headquarters: Morrisville
- Website: North Carolina State Board of Dental Examiners

The North Carolina State Board of Dental Examiners is an agency of the Government of North Carolina. Its purpose is to regulate the dental industry in the state. Its headquarters are in Morrisville in the Research Triangle area.

== History ==
In 1879, the North Carolina General Assembly created the State Board of Dental Examiners to license dentists in the state. At its inception, members of the board were elected by the North Carolina Dental Society. Legislation giving the board regulatory authority over dental hygienists was enacted in 1945. In 1961, legislation was passed making the body the only licensing board in the state to have its members elected by all license holders in the state.

== Structure and jurisdiction ==
The State Board of Dental Examiners has eight members. Six of the members are dentists. They serve three year-terms, with two such members being elected by licensed dentists in the state every year. One dental hygienist is elected by licensed hygienists every three years and a consumer advocate is appointed by the governor. The board retains a 14-member staff. Its activities are mostly funded through the collection of licensing fees.

The board is responsible for licensing dentists and dental hygienists to practice in North Carolina, creating rules to govern those practices, and investigating violations. The board cannot file criminal charges against a person suspected of misconduct but does give evidence to local prosecutors.

== Controversies ==
Former North Carolina Governor Roy Cooper offered Shital Patel, who advocates for reform to sedation dentistry after the death of her husband, the role of consumer member on the Board. That role was later filled by Teresa Vincent, whose late husband was a dentist. As her original reform proposal continued to be blocked in the General Assembly, Patel turned her attention to advocating for change in the makeup and governance of the Board. Under the proposed bill, the size of the Board would increase from 6 to 10 members, members would be chosen by government officials rather than by current Board members, and the Board would include two consumer advocates without personal or spousal ties to the dental industry.

== See also ==
- Government of North Carolina

== Works cited ==
- Koch, Charles R. E., ed. (1909). History of Dental Surgery. Vol. 1. Chicago: National Art Publishing Company.
- "The Regulation of Businesses and Professions". Popular Government. Vol. 11, no. 2–7. UNC Institute of Government. July 1945. pp. 25–26.
- Sanders, John L. (1961). "State Government". Popular Government. Vol. 28, no. 1–2. UNC Institute of Government. pp. 3–8, 69.
