= Consumer and Family Advisory Committee (North Carolina) =

Consumer and Family Advisory Committees advise North Carolina area authorities and county programs regarding mental health, developmental disabilities, and substance abuse services. CFAC members are people who receive services (consumers) or family members of consumers.

== Local CFACs ==
Each area authority or county program in North Carolina establishes a Local CFAC to be a self‑governing and self‑directed organization. Local CFACs provide advice regarding the planning and management of the public mental health, developmental disabilities, and substance abuse services.

== State CFAC ==
The State Consumer and Family Advisory Committee (SCFAC) is a self-governing and self-directed organization established by the General Statutes and included in the State Plans for the Division of MHDDSAS. The State CFAC advises the North Carolina Department of Health and Human Services and the General Assembly regarding the planning and management of statewide public mental health, developmental disabilities, and substance abuse services.
