= North Carolina Safety and Emission Vehicle Inspection =

American state government agency

Agency overview
- Jurisdiction: State of North Carolina
- Website: NCDOT DMV Emissions & Safety Inspections

North Carolina Safety and Emission Vehicle Inspection is responsible for ensuring that vehicles in North Carolina meet the safety and in some counties emissions standards. A fee is charged for the inspection of vehicles, and an extra fee if your vehicle has after-market window tinting.

== Which vehicles get inspected ==
North Carolina has a total of 100 counties. In all North Carolina counties, passenger vehicles under 30 years old require a yearly Safety Inspection. North Carolina requires emission systems tests for cars and light-duty trucks as part of the annual safety inspection in 19 counties. Vehicles newer than 20 years old are required to have the smog check. Any vehicles newer than 1996 are equipped with On-Board Diagnostic (OBDII) systems, which help inspectors check that the vehicle's pollution controls are working. The 19 counties that require emissions inspections are: Alamance, Buncombe, Cabarrus, Cumberland, Davidson, Durham, Forsyth, Franklin, Gaston, Guilford, Iredell, Johnston, Lincoln, Mecklenburg, New Hanover, Randolph, Rowan, Union, or Wake.

=== Exempt vehicles ===
Cars over 30 years old that are registered as Antique Cars are exempt from both safety and emissions inspection. In addition, diesel-powered vehicles, electric vehicles, vehicles that are 20 years old and older and farm vehicles as well as any vehicle in one of the 19 Safety and Emission counties that has a Gross Vehicle Weight Rating (GVWR) greater than 8,500 pounds only requires a Safety inspection.

As of April 1, 2015 North Carolina General Statute 20-183.2 exempts certain vehicles within the most recent three model years, and having fewer than 70,000 miles on the odometer, from emissions inspection. The NC Department of Environmental Quality provides a calculator to help determine if a particular vehicle may be exempt. Also in Mecklenburg County, vehicles 2017 and newer are exempt from emissions testing as of 2023.

In May/June 2026, North Carolina's DEQ will remove the 18-county requirement for emissions testing due to improvements in air quality and the fact that new vehicles produce fewer emissions (Alamance, Buncombe, Cabarrus, Cumberland, Davidson, Durham, Forsyth, Franklin, Gaston, Guilford, Iredell, Johnston, Lincoln, New Hanover, Randolph, Rowan, Union, or Wake.) with the approval of EPA, except for one county which is in Mecklenburg County, which includes the state's largest city of Charlotte since it's the only ozone non-attainment county in the state.

== NC Vehicle inspector requirements ==
To become a Safety Inspector in North Carolina, requires attending an eight-hour Safety Inspection course offered by a North Carolina Community College. This is followed by a fifty-question multiple choice written exam, requiring a score of at least eighty percent. To perform both Safety and Emission Inspections requires attending an additional eight-hour Emission Inspection class. Before beginning to work as an inspector, requires certification by local Inspectors/Auditors which requires the successful completion of a live vehicle inspection administered by a Department of Motor Vehicle Representative. A certified Inspector’s Safety license is valid for 4 years, while the Inspectors Emission license is valid for 2 years. Maintaining these licenses requires returning to a North Carolina Community College to re-certify.

== See also ==
- Government of North Carolina
