= Government of North Carolina =

Government of the U.S. state of North Carolina

- Great Seal of North Carolina
- Polity type: Presidential System
- Constitution: Constitution of North Carolina

Legislative branch
- Name: General Assembly
- Type: Bicameral
- Meeting place: North Carolina State Legislative Building
- Upper house
- Name: Senate
- Presiding officer: Rachel Hunt, President
- Lower house
- Name: House of Representatives
- Presiding officer: Destin Hall, Speaker

Executive branch
- Head of state and government
- Title: Governor
- Currently: Josh Stein
- Appointer: Election
- Cabinet
- Name: Cabinet
- Leader: Governor
- Deputy leader: Lieutenant Governor
- Headquarters: State Capitol

Judicial branch
- Name: Judiciary of North Carolina
- Courts: Courts of North Carolina
- North Carolina Supreme Court
- Chief judge: Paul Martin Newby
- Seat: Law and Justice Building, Raleigh

The government of North Carolina is divided into three branches: executive, legislative, and judicial. These consist of the Council of State (led by the Governor), the bicameral legislature (called the General Assembly), and the state court system (headed by the North Carolina Supreme Court). The Constitution of North Carolina delineates the structure and function of the state government.

== Executive branch ==
North Carolina's executive branch is governed by Article III of the state constitution. The first North Carolina Constitution in 1776 called for a governor and a seven member Council of State elected by the legislature. Currently, the ten-member Council of State of North Carolina includes the following members elected by voters:

1. Governor
2. Lieutenant Governor
3. Attorney General
4. Secretary of State
5. Commissioner of Agriculture
6. Commissioner of Insurance
7. Commissioner of Labor
8. Superintendent of Public Instruction
9. State Treasurer
10. State Auditor

The Council of State as a collective body is accorded little responsibility by the state constitution, though some statues grant it authority in certain cases, particularly in the acquisition of property by the state.

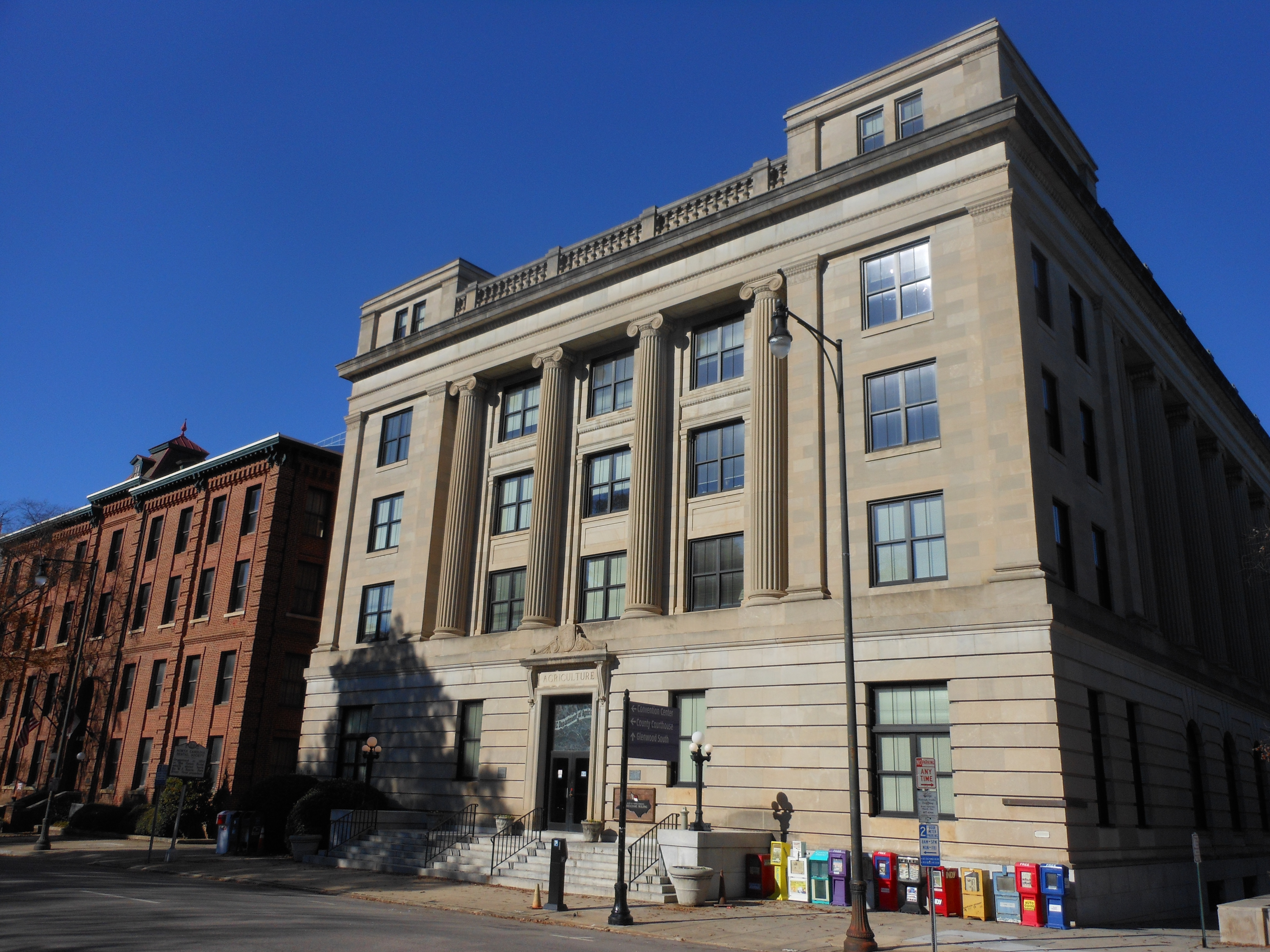
The Department of Agriculture Building in Raleigh

The ten North Carolina Cabinet departments, headed by department secretaries appointed by the Governor, are as follows:

1. Department of Administration
2. Department of Commerce
3. Department of Natural and Cultural Resources
4. Department of Environmental Quality
5. Department of Health and Human Services
6. Department of Information Technology
7. Department of Revenue
8. Department of Public Safety
9. Department of Military and Veterans Affairs
10. Department of Transportation

The North Carolina Register includes information about state agency rules, administrative rules, executive orders and other notices, and is published bimonthly. The North Carolina Administrative Code (NCAC) contains all the codified rules.

In addition to the cabinet and Council of State, North Carolina has three independent executive agencies: the Office of Administrative Hearings, the Office of the State Controller, and the State Board of Elections.

== Legislative branch ==
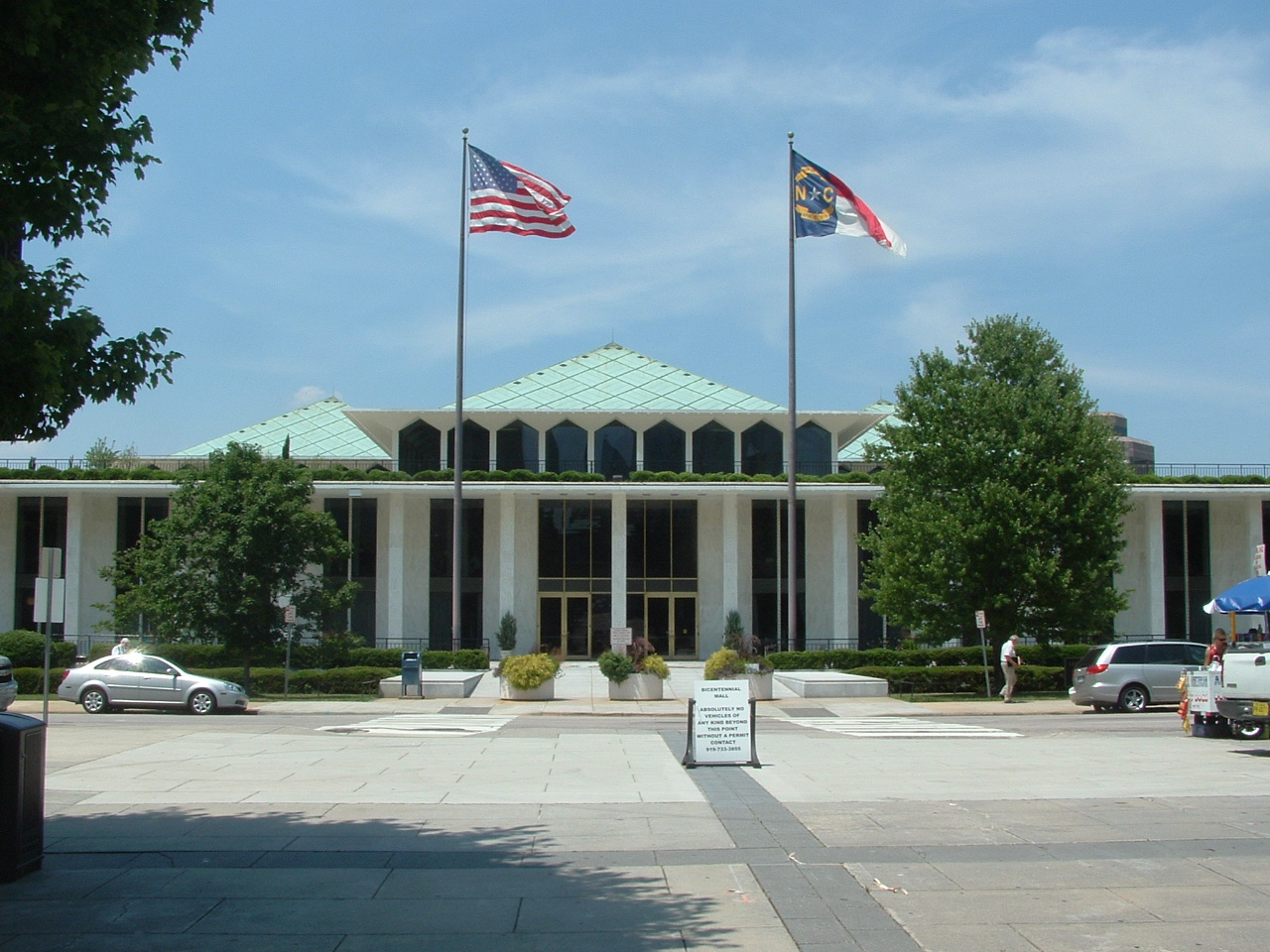
The North Carolina State Legislative Building in Raleigh

The legislature derives its authority from Article II of the North Carolina Constitution. The North Carolina General Assembly is the state legislature. Like all other states except for Nebraska, the legislature is bicameral, currently consisting of the 120-member North Carolina House of Representatives and the 50-member North Carolina Senate. The lieutenant governor is the ex officio president of the state Senate. The Senate also elects its own president pro tempore and the House elects its speaker. Its session laws are published in the official North Carolina Session Laws and codified as the North Carolina General Statutes.

The constitution of North Carolina vests the state's legislative power in the General Assembly; the General Assembly writes state laws/statutes. The assembly has the power to levy taxes and adopts the state budget. The General Assembly has the sole power to propose amendments to the state constitution. If a proposed amendment receives the support of three-fifths of the House and the Senate, it is scheduled for ratification by a statewide referendum.

== Judiciary ==
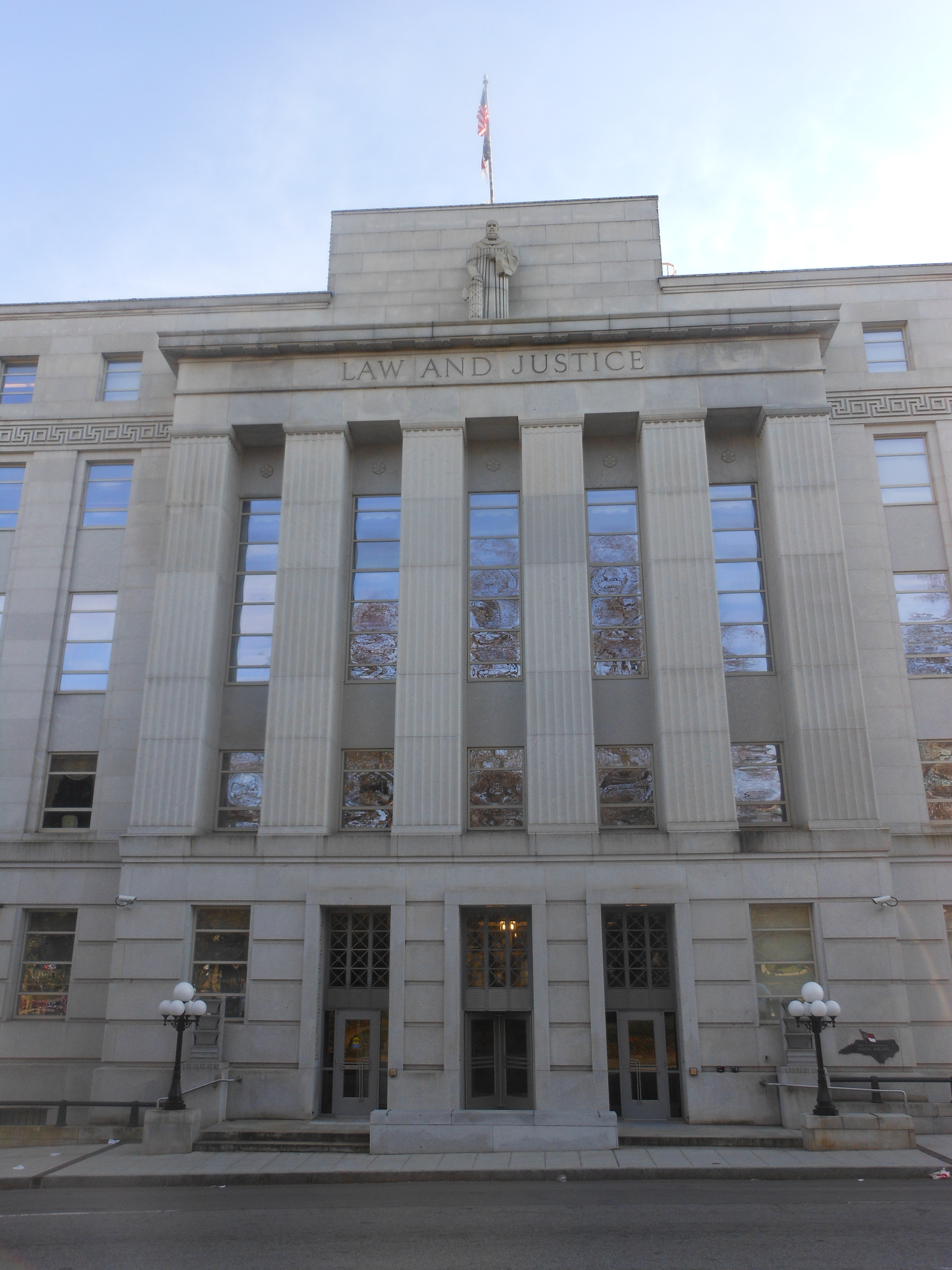
The Law and Justice Building, which houses the Supreme Court

North Carolina's judiciary derives its authority from Article IV of the North Carolina Constitution. The current judicial system was created in the 1960s after significant consolidation and reform. The state court system is unified into one General Court of Justice. The General Court is composed of a District Court Division, a Superior Court Division, and an Appellate Division. The Administrative Office of the Courts oversees all clerical and financial aspects of the state judicial system.

At the helm of the General Court of Justice and one of the two components of the Appellate Division is the Supreme Court of North Carolina. The Supreme Court consists of one chief justice and six associate justices, all popularly elected to serve eight-year terms. The primary function of the tribunal is to decide questions of law that have arisen in the lower courts and before state administrative agencies, and its docket is typically dominated by cases concerning interpretation of the constitution, major legal questions, and appeals of criminal cases involving capital punishment. The North Carolina Court of Appeals is the state's intermediate appellate court and consists of fifteen judges who rule in rotating panels of three. Together, the Supreme Court and Court of Appeals constitute the appellate division of the court system.

The Superior Court is the trial court of general jurisdiction in the state. In criminal matters, superior courts hear all felony cases and handle appeals of misdemeanors and infractions from District Courts. In civil matters, superior courts have original jurisdiction over civil disputes with an amount in controversy exceeding $25,000. The Superior Court also adjudicates most appeals from state administrative agencies.

In criminal matters, the District Courts have jurisdiction over misdemeanor and infraction cases adjudicated without the presence of a jury. State law also allows them to try some low-level felony cases with the agreement of a judge and the prosecution and defense. In civil matters, the courts have original jurisdiction over civil disputes with an amount in controversy under $25,000, divorces, child custody disputes, and child support payments. Magistrates in the court issue criminal processes, perform marriages, hear eviction and other small claims cases, and order involuntary commitments.

== Local government ==
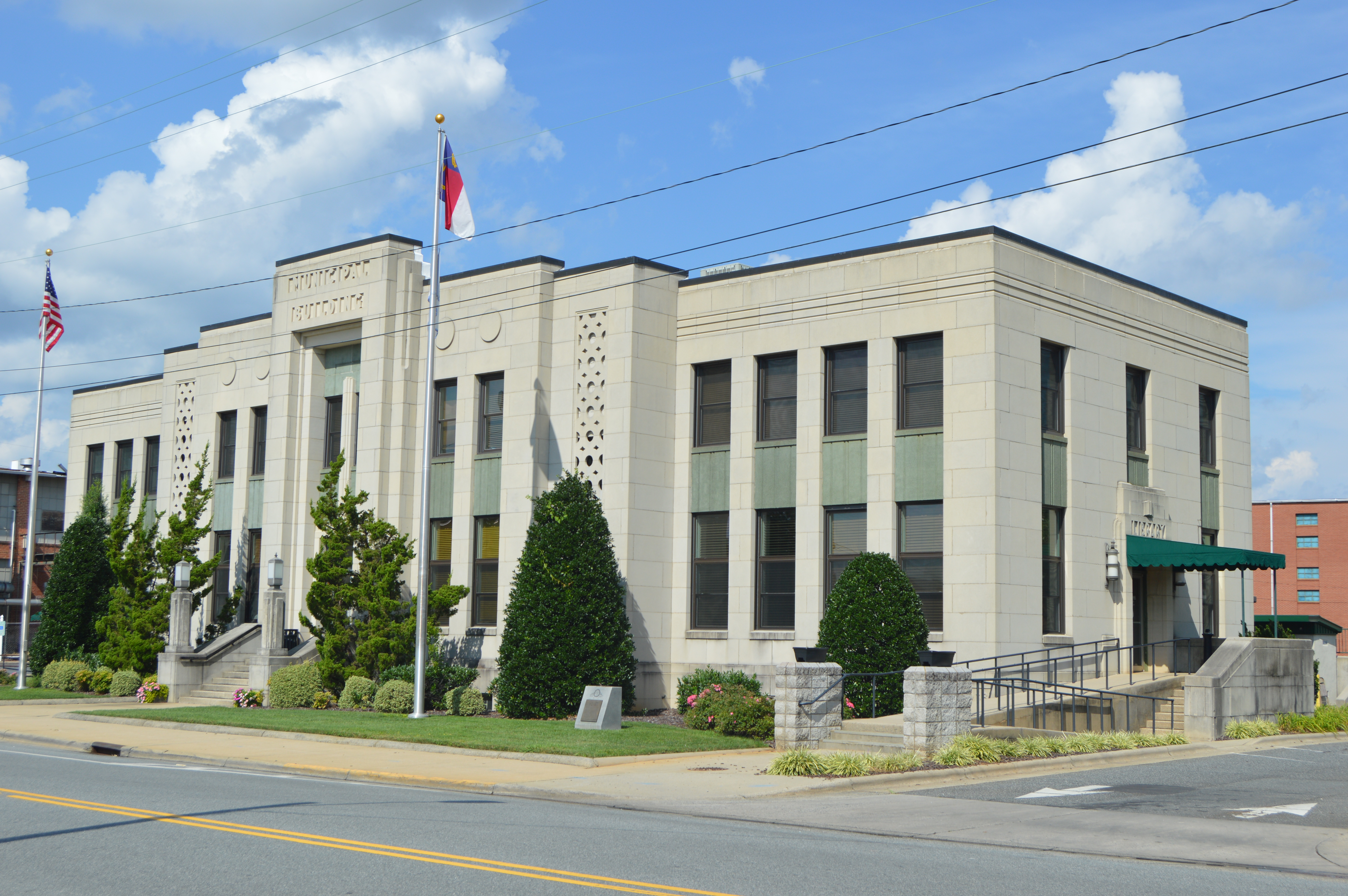
Municipal Building in Asheboro, North Carolina

=== Overview ===
North Carolina municipalities

The General Assembly's authority to create local governments comes from Article VII of the Constitution of North Carolina. Local governments in North Carolina primarily consist of counties, cities, and towns. The state makes no legal distinction between a town and a city; all are treated as municipalities, with the name being a matter of choice. North Carolina has 100 counties and more than 552 municipalities. There are also special purpose governments, most of which concern either soil and water conservation or housing and community development. Some local governments are joined in regional councils with others to improve coordination and cooperation.

=== Counties ===
Every section of land in North Carolina is included in a county. All counties in the state are led by an elected board of commissioners who employ a county manager. Boards of commissioners vary in size from three to 11 members. In addition to the manager, the commissioners usually hire the county's clerk, attorney, assessor, and tax collector. Unlike in municipal council-manager governments in the state, the board of commissioners usually must approve all of the manager's hiring decisions unless they explicitly delegate sole hiring authority to the manager. County government in North Carolina is also more fractured than municipal government, due to the presence of other elected officials such as sheriffs and registers of deeds, who have control over their own staff. The office of county sheriff is established by the constitution, and sheriffs are not subject to the oversight of the state government. County government is largely funded through local property taxes. All counties in North Carolina are subdivided into townships. A legacy of Reconstruction era alterations to government structure, townships no longer have any legal authority but serve primarily as organizing units for administrative purposes.

County governments in North Carolina include the following officials:

- Sheriffs
- County commissioners
- Register of deeds
- Clerk of court
- Alcoholic Beverage Control Board
- Board of Education
- Board of Elections
- Public Health Board
- Mental Health Board
- Social Services Board

=== Municipalities ===
North Carolina is a Dillon's rule state, and municipalities are only able to exercise the authority that the General Assembly or state constitution explicitly gives them. All municipalities in North Carolina operate under either mayor-council governments or council-manager government, with most using the latter. All have an elected general governing board known variously as a city or town council, the board of commissioners or the board of aldermen. Some of these municipalities have mayors, who preside over the elected city council, which determines local government policy and creates the city budget. Most mayors are popularly elected and do not typically vote in council meetings. The council hires the city manager and, depending on the municipality, may directly hire a few other officials, such as the city attorney. In cities with a manager, the manager acts as the head executive officer of the city and is responsible for municipal employees and implementing policy. Smaller municipalities are more likely to not employ a manager. The state constitution allows for consolidated city-county government, though Camden County is the only entity in the state to presently operate that way. Some municipalities have limited authority granted by state law, mostly in planning and zoning affairs, extending outside their formal jurisdictions.

=== Special purpose districts and authorities ===
Special purpose districts are local governments in the state with taxation power and narrowly defined scope. The most common special districts are sanitary districts and rural fire protection districts. Authorities do not have taxation power. The most common authorities are housing authorities, water and sewer authorities, and airport authorities.

== See also ==
- Politics of North Carolina
- List of governors of North Carolina
- Law of North Carolina
- List of North Carolina state agencies

== Works cited ==
- Cooper, Christopher A.; Knotts, H. Gibbs, eds. (2012). The New Politics of North Carolina. Chapel Hill: University of North Carolina Press. ISBN 9781469606583.
- Fleer, Jack D. (1994). North Carolina Government & Politics. Lincoln: University of Nebraska Press. ISBN 9780803268852.
- Lawrence, David M. (2014). "Chapter 1 : An Overview of Local Government" (PDF). County and Municipal Government (second ed.). Chapel Hill: University of North Carolina School of Government. pp. 2–13. ISBN 978-1-56011-775-9.
- Orth, John V.; Newby, Paul M. (2013). The North Carolina State Constitution (second ed.). Oxford University Press. ISBN 9780199300655.
