= Texas Capitol Police =

Texas Capitol Police patch

The Texas Capitol Police (or properly, Region VII - Capitol of the Texas Highway Patrol) provide law enforcement and security for state property within the Texas Capitol Complex. The Department of Public Safety assumed the responsibilities of the Capitol Police by legislative mandate in 1991. The previous Capitol Police department was a division of the State Purchasing and General Services Commission. The first DPS Capitol Police recruits graduated from the Training Academy in 1993. The first Capitol Police officers commissioned by DPS were not given the full recruit school training that Highway Patrol recruits received and were not initially eligible to transfer outside of the Capitol Police without first attending a DPS Recruit Academy. This has changed and DPS Capitol is now considered a DPS Region that troopers transfer in and out of in comparison to other regions.

Officers are assigned to one of 4 areas:

- The Capitol Detail, which provides security at the Capitol, Capitol Extension and grounds;
- Police and Security Operations, which provides police patrol and building security at other locations not covered by the Capitol Detail;
- Special Police Operations, which provides criminal investigations, parking administration, research, training and budget management, and communications.
- Protection Detail, which provides protection for high-ranking state officials, such as the Governor, Lieutenant Governor, and Speaker of the House.

== See also ==
- List of law enforcement agencies in Texas
