= North Carolina General Assembly Police =

North Carolina state legislature security police agency

Agency overview
- Formed: 1975

Jurisdictional structure
- Operations jurisdiction: North Carolina, U.S.
- General nature: Civilian police

Operational structure
- Headquarters: 300 N. Salisbury St. Raleigh, NC
- Agency executive: Martin Brock, Chief

Website
- Official website

The North Carolina General Assembly Police is a security police agency responsible for law enforcement and security of the North Carolina General Assembly buildings in Wake County, North Carolina, United States. The agency is separate from the North Carolina State Capitol Police

== Operations ==
The force was formed in 1975, following the foundation of the State Capitol Police in 1967. It currently has 20 sworn officers, and is responsible for policing the buildings used by the General Assembly, and investigating threats to legislators, staff or members of their immediate families. In 2017, the force's annual budget was $1,869,329. The force has two marked vehicles and one unmarked vehicle, with the marked vehicles being used "to provide a law enforcement visual deterrent on the complex".

Officers of the force have jurisdiction:

- within parts of the City of Raleigh, and the unincorporated parts of Wake County, surrounded by the Raleigh beltline, and
- throughout North Carolina, while:
  - accompanying a member of the General Assembly on official duties,
  - preparing for, or providing security to, a session of either or both houses of the General Assembly, or official events directly related to that session,
  - on official business in connection with providing security for legislative members, staff, and the public for any meeting of a committee, a caucus, or any committee or commission meeting of the General Assembly, or any state, regional, or national meetings of legislative bodies or organizations representing legislative bodies, and while accompanying a member of the General Assembly to or from any such event,
  - conducting a criminal investigation of a threat of physical violence against the General Assembly, a member or staff of the General Assembly, or their immediate family,
  - accompanying a member of the General Assembly for the purpose of providing executive protection in response to a threat of physical violence,
  - serving a subpoena issued by the General Assembly, or a committee of the General Assembly.

General Assembly Police officers may also arrest throughout the state when in hot pursuit from an area of their jurisdiction, and have the exclusive authority and responsibility for enforcing the parking rules of the Legislative Services Commission.

== See also ==
- Capitol police
- List of law enforcement agencies in North Carolina
- North Carolina State Capitol Police
