= North Carolina State Legislative Building =

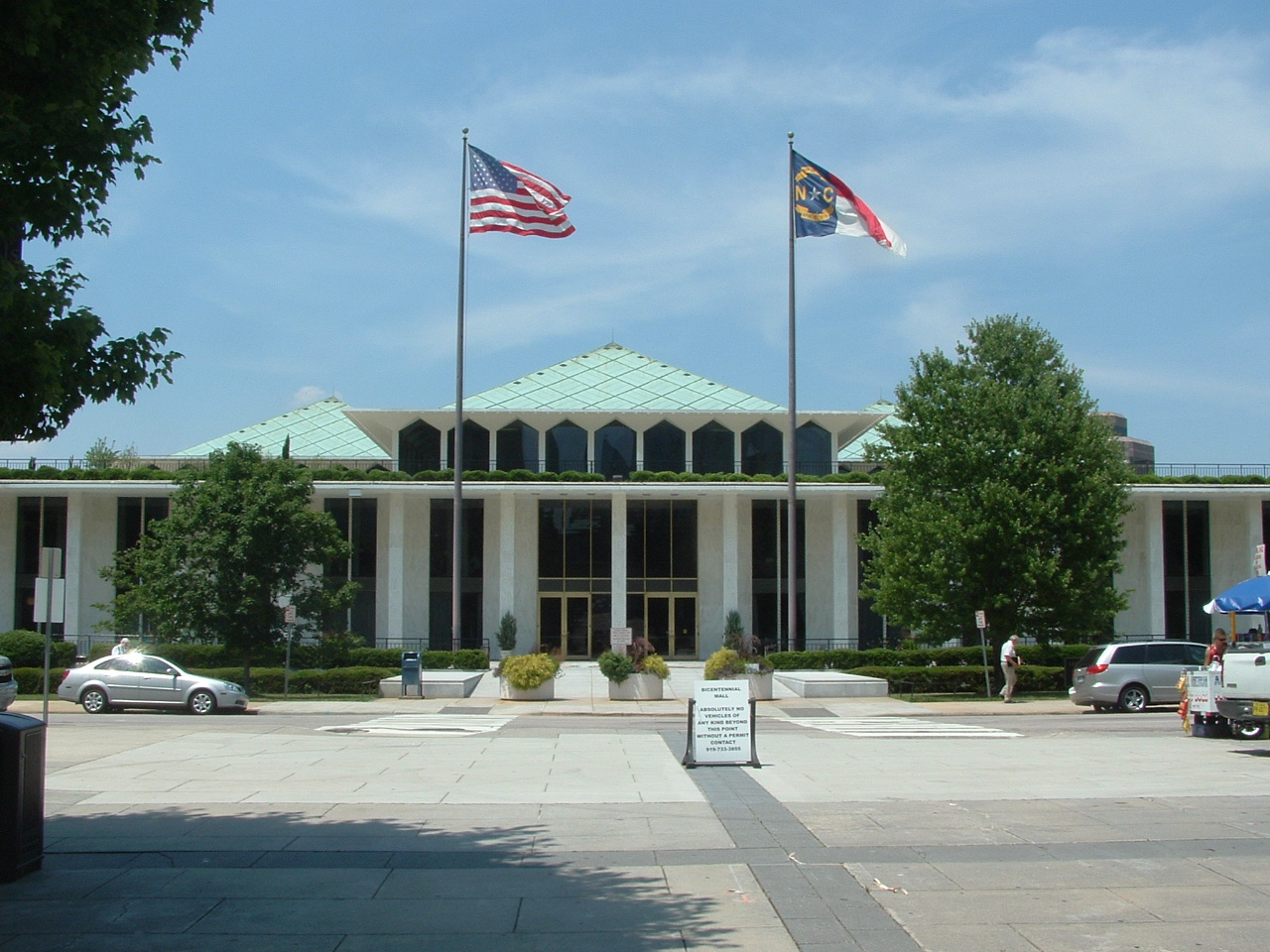
- Interactive map of the North Carolina State Legislative Building area

General information
- Type: Legislative Building
- Location: Raleigh, North Carolina
- Coordinates: 35°46′59.53″N 78°38′20.24″W
- Current tenants: North Carolina General Assembly
- Completed: 1963; 63 years ago

Technical details
- Floor count: 3
- Floor area: 206,000 square feet (19,100 m^{2})

Design and construction
- Architect: Edward Durell Stone

The North Carolina State Legislative Building was opened in 1963 and is the current meeting place of the North Carolina General Assembly, the state legislature of the U.S. state of North Carolina.

== Location ==
The Legislative Building is located in Raleigh, across from the North Carolina Museum of Natural Sciences and Bicentennial Mall and one block north of the state Capitol.

== Design and construction ==
In 1959 a commission was formed to guide the construction of a new legislative building to replace the North Carolina State Capitol as the home of the legislature since 1840. Architect Edward Durrell Stone was selected to design the building in partnership with North Carolina firm Holloway & Reeves. The building opened in February 1963.

The building and furnishings cost $5.5 million, or $1.24 for each citizen of North Carolina. Construction required 10,500 cubic yards (8,000 m^{3}) of concrete, 145,000 masonry blocks, and 192,000 square feet (17,800 m^{2}) of terrazzo.

== Architectural details ==
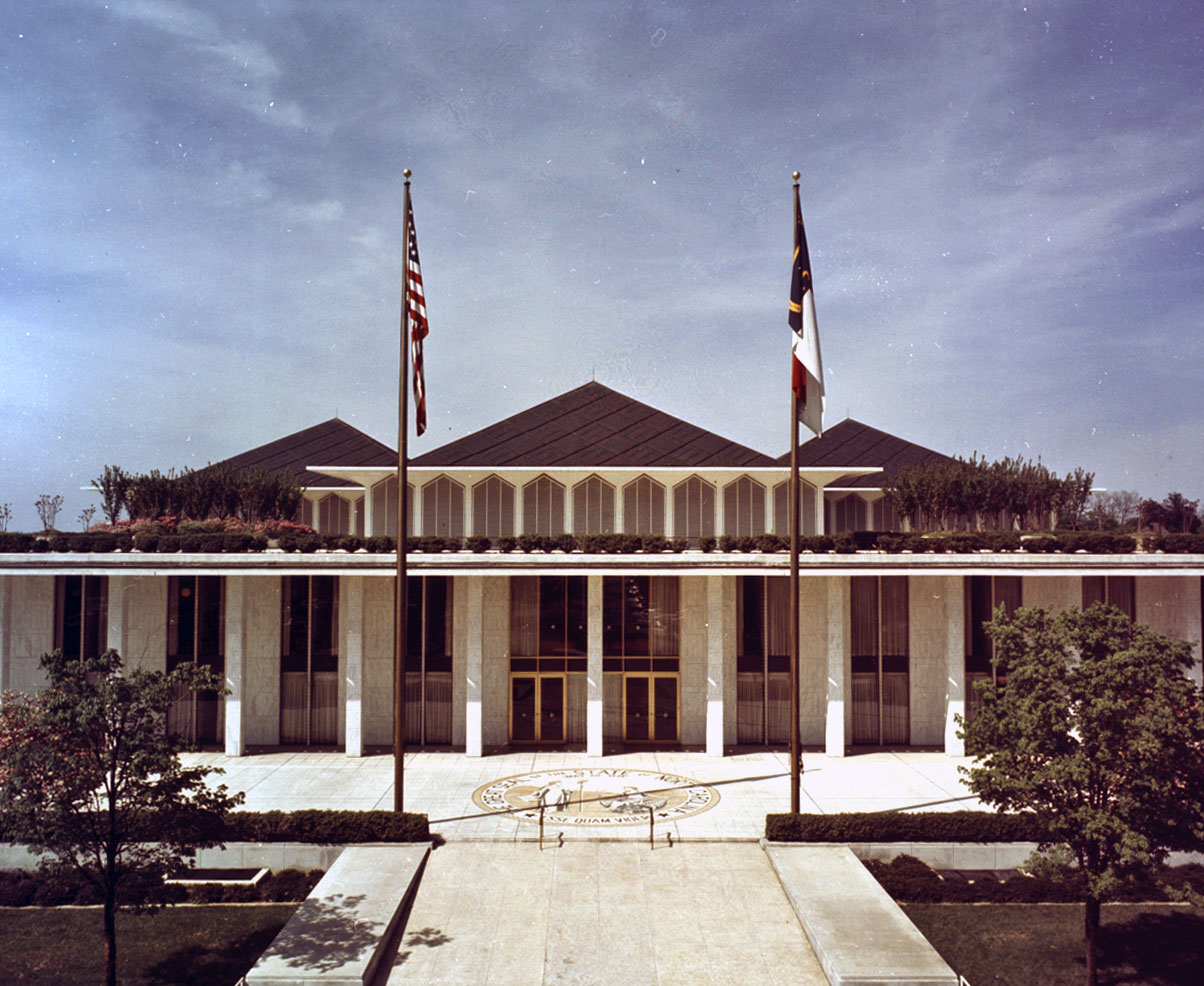
Alternative view of the main façade

The building contains separate chambers for the North Carolina House of Representatives and North Carolina Senate. Architectural details include a 22-foot-wide (6.7 m), red-carpeted stairway that leads from the front entrance to the third floor galleries for the House and Senate, roof gardens and garden courts at the four interior corners. Each pair of brass doors that leads to the House and Senate chambers weighs 1,700 pounds (770 kg). A 12-foot-diameter brass chandelier (3.7 m) in the rotunda weighs 750 pounds (340 kg). Brass chandeliers in the chambers and the main stairway are 8 ft in diameter (2.4 m) and weigh 625 pounds (283 kg) each. The building entrance features a 28 ft (8.5 m) diameter terrazzo mosaic of the Great Seal of the State of North Carolina.

The building is open to the public Monday through Friday but has recently been closed to the public on the weekends due to ongoing maintenance.

== See also ==
- List of state and territorial capitols in the United States
