= North Carolina State Capitol =

State capitol building of the U.S. state of North Carolina

- U.S. National Register of Historic Places
- U.S. National Historic Landmark
- U.S. Historic district – Contributing property
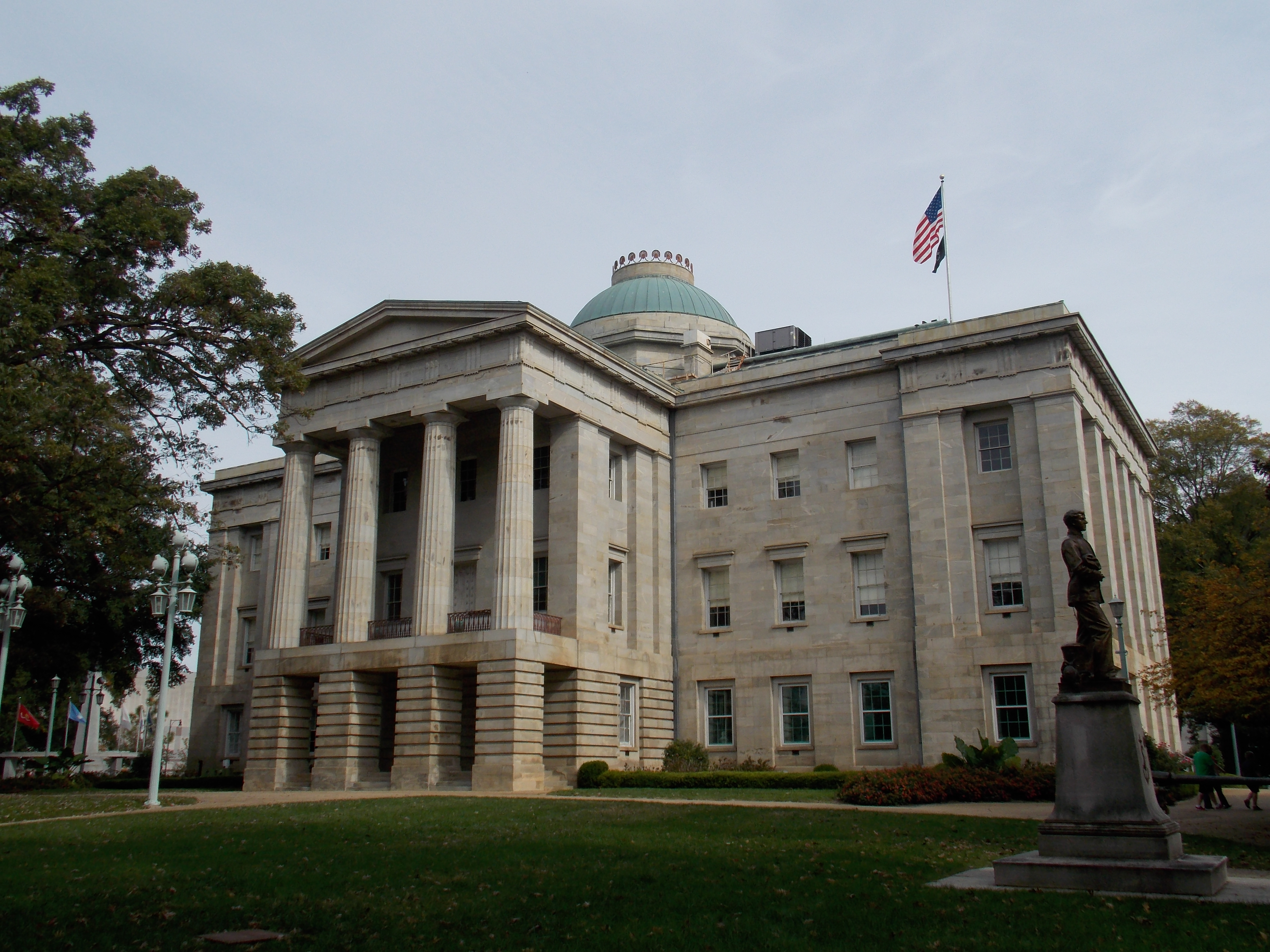

- Location within North Carolina Location within the United States
- Interactive map showing North Carolina State Capitol's location
- Location: 1 E Edenton St, Raleigh, North Carolina
- Coordinates: 35°46′49.3″N 78°38′20.8″W
- Built: 1833; 193 years ago
- Architect: Multiple
- Architectural style: Greek Revival
- Part of: Capitol Area Historic District (ID78001978)
- NRHP reference No.: 70000476

Significant dates
- Added to NRHP: February 26, 1970
- Designated NHL: November 6, 1973
- Designated CP: April 15, 1978

The North Carolina State Capitol is the former seat of the legislature of the U.S. state of North Carolina which housed all of the state's government until 1888. The Supreme Court and State Library moved into a separate building in 1888, and the General Assembly moved into the State Legislative Building in 1963. Today, the governor and his immediate staff occupy offices on the first floor of the Capitol.

== History ==
The building was built following the destruction by fire of the first North Carolina State House in 1831, and today houses the offices of the Governor of North Carolina. It is located in the state capital of Raleigh on Union Square at One East Edenton Street. The cornerstone of the Greek Revival building was laid with Masonic honors by the Grand Master of North Carolina Masons Simmons Jones Baker on July 4, 1833. Construction was completed in 1840. It was designed primarily by the architectural firm of Ithiel Town and Alexander Jackson Davis. Often credited solely to that team, the design of the capitol was actually the result of a sequence of work by William Nichols Sr. and his son William Nichols Jr., Town and Davis, and then David Paton. The Capitol housed the entire state government until 1888, and the North Carolina General Assembly met in the capitol building until 1961. The Grand Lodge of North Carolina laid a second cornerstone on the centenary of the first on July 4, 1933. The legislature relocated to its current location in the North Carolina State Legislative Building in 1963. The North Carolina Supreme Court has also convened in the building in the past, most recently meeting in the capitol's senate chamber in 2005 while the Supreme Court Building was undergoing renovations. The Governor and the governor's immediate staff has continued to occupy offices in the building. The Capitol remains largely unaltered from its 1840 state. Only three rooms have been significantly altered through remodeling: the two committee rooms in the east and west wings of the second floor, which were divided horizontally to provide space for restrooms, and the office in the east wing of the first floor, part of which had to be cut away to permit space for an elevator to be installed in 1951.

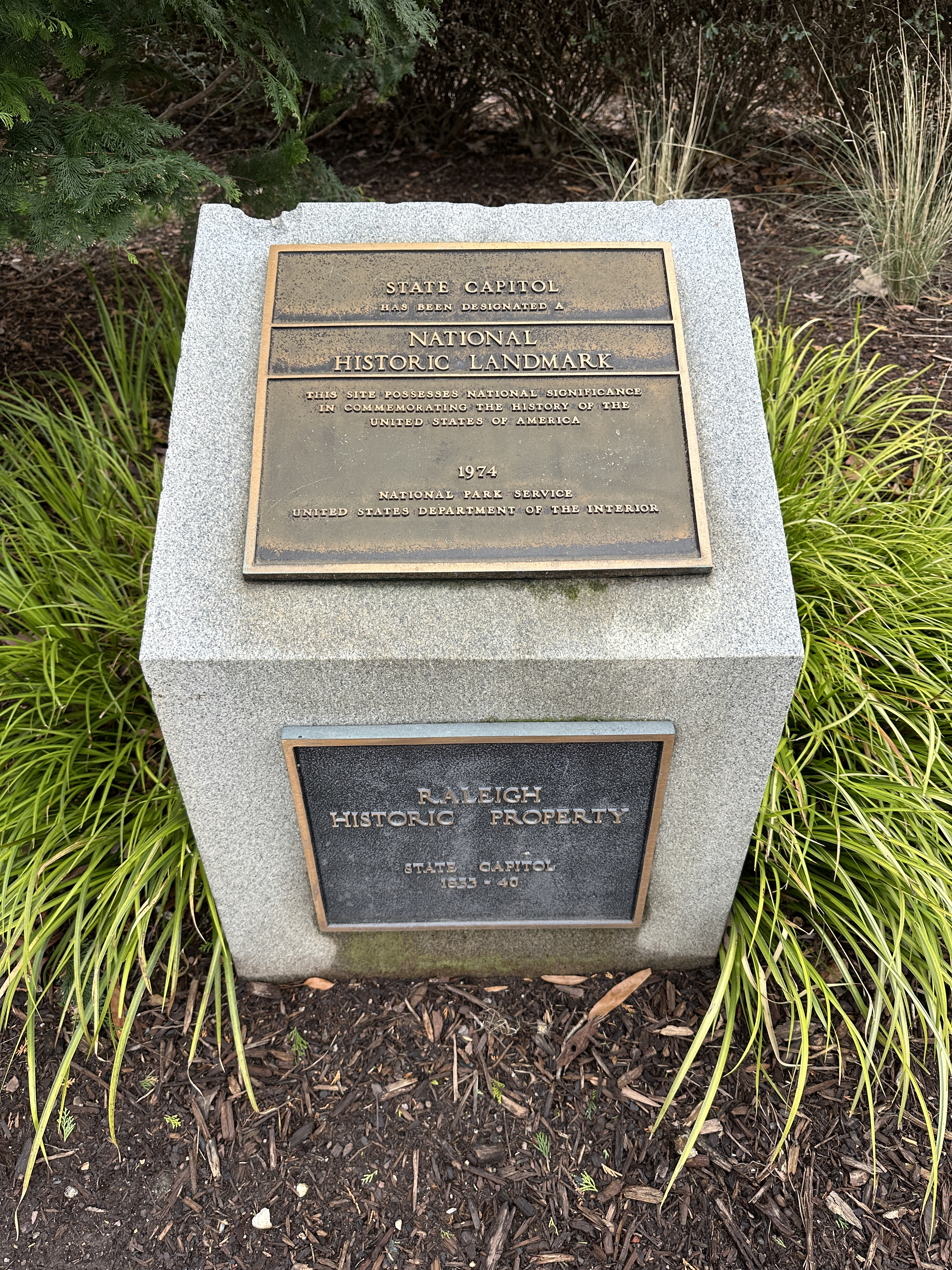
Plaque noting the building’s dedication as a National Historic Landmark

The Capitol was declared a National Historic Landmark in 1973 and the building is located in the Capitol Area Historic District.

The first assembly to meet in this building was the 63rd North Carolina General Assembly of 1840–1841 on November 16, 1840. The last assembly to meet in this building was the 124th North Carolina General Assembly of 1961, which met from February 8 to June 22, 1961.

Following the heated protests for racial equality of 2020, Governor Roy Cooper ordered the removal of the largest Confederate statue on the State Capitol Grounds.

The 2021 state budget included $10 million to repair the roof, including the dome. Replacement of the roof is planned for 2023.

== North Carolina legislature buildings ==
The North Carolina General Assembly may have initially met in Tryon Palace after being vacated by the British in 1776. The assembly met in various locations until a building dedicated for use by the state government was completed in 1794 in Raleigh. This building was destroyed by fire in 1831. The North Carolina State Capitol building was the home to the assembly from 1840 to 1961.

Name	First Occupied (Assembly)	Last Occupied (Assembly)	Picture
Tryon Palace	1777 (1st)	1777	Tryon Palace
North Carolina State House	1794 (19th)	1810 (35th)	North Carolina State House
Renovated North Carolina State House	1811 (36th)	1831 (55th)	Renovated North Carolina State House
North Carolina State Capitol	1840 (63rd)	1961 (124th)	North Carolina State Capitol
North Carolina State Legislative Building	1963 (125th)	still in use	North Carolina State Legislative Building

== Images of the North Carolina State Capitol building ==
In the rotunda is a statue of George Washington. The rotunda statue is a replica of the original statue by Antonio Canova, which was destroyed by a fire in 1831. A bust of the 29th Governor of North Carolina (1841–1845), John Motley Morehead, sits inside the capitol. A statue of George Washington is on the south side of the capitol. On the east side of the capitol sits a statue of the three Presidents of the United States from North Carolina: James Knox Polk of Mecklenburg County, Andrew Jackson of Union County sitting on horse, and Andrew Johnson of Wake County. The grounds of the capitol also includes statues honoring veterans of the Civil War and Viet Nam War. The grounds had a statue honoring women of the Confederacy, until its removal in 2020.

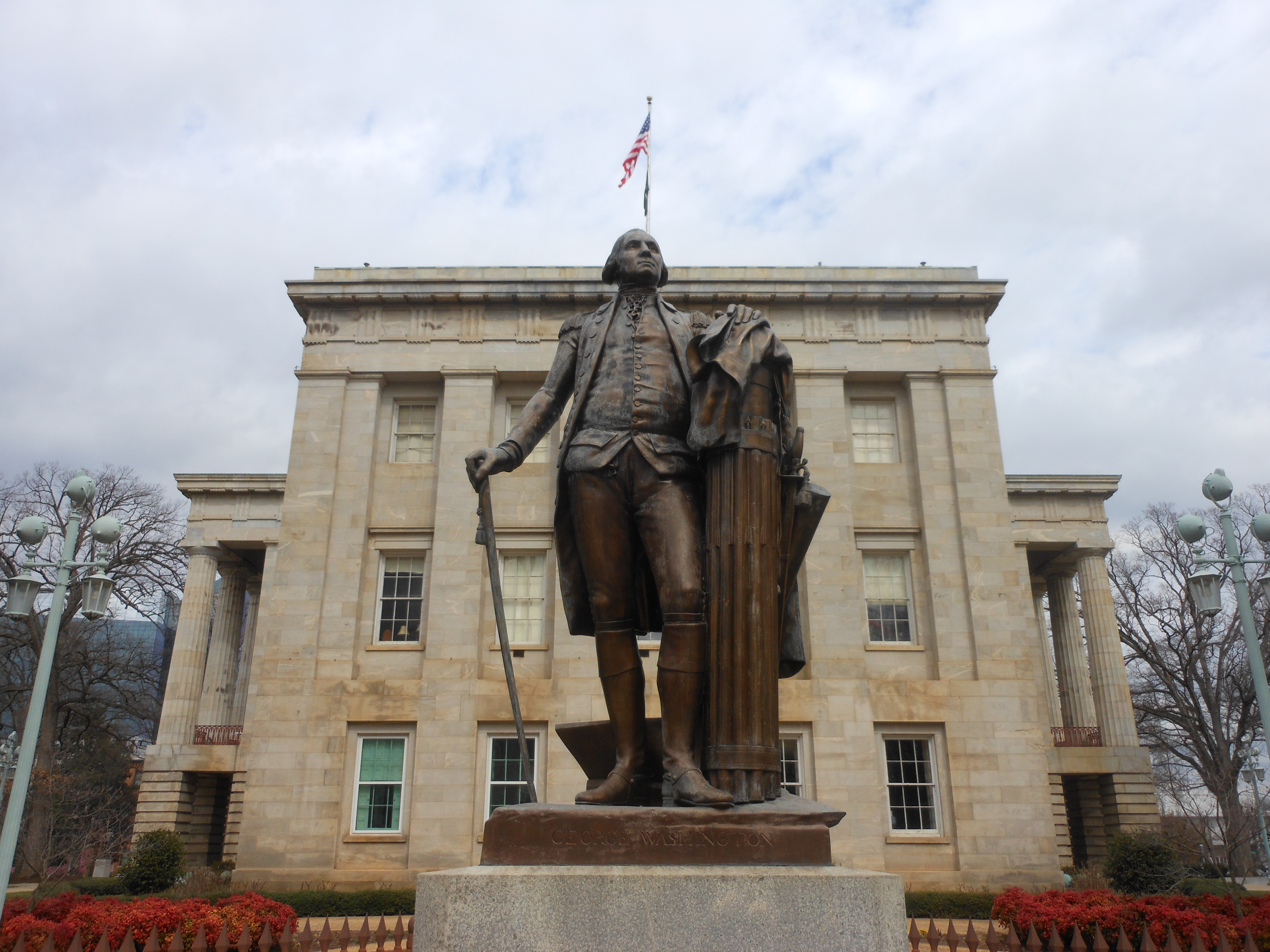
George Washington Statue at North Carolina State Capitol

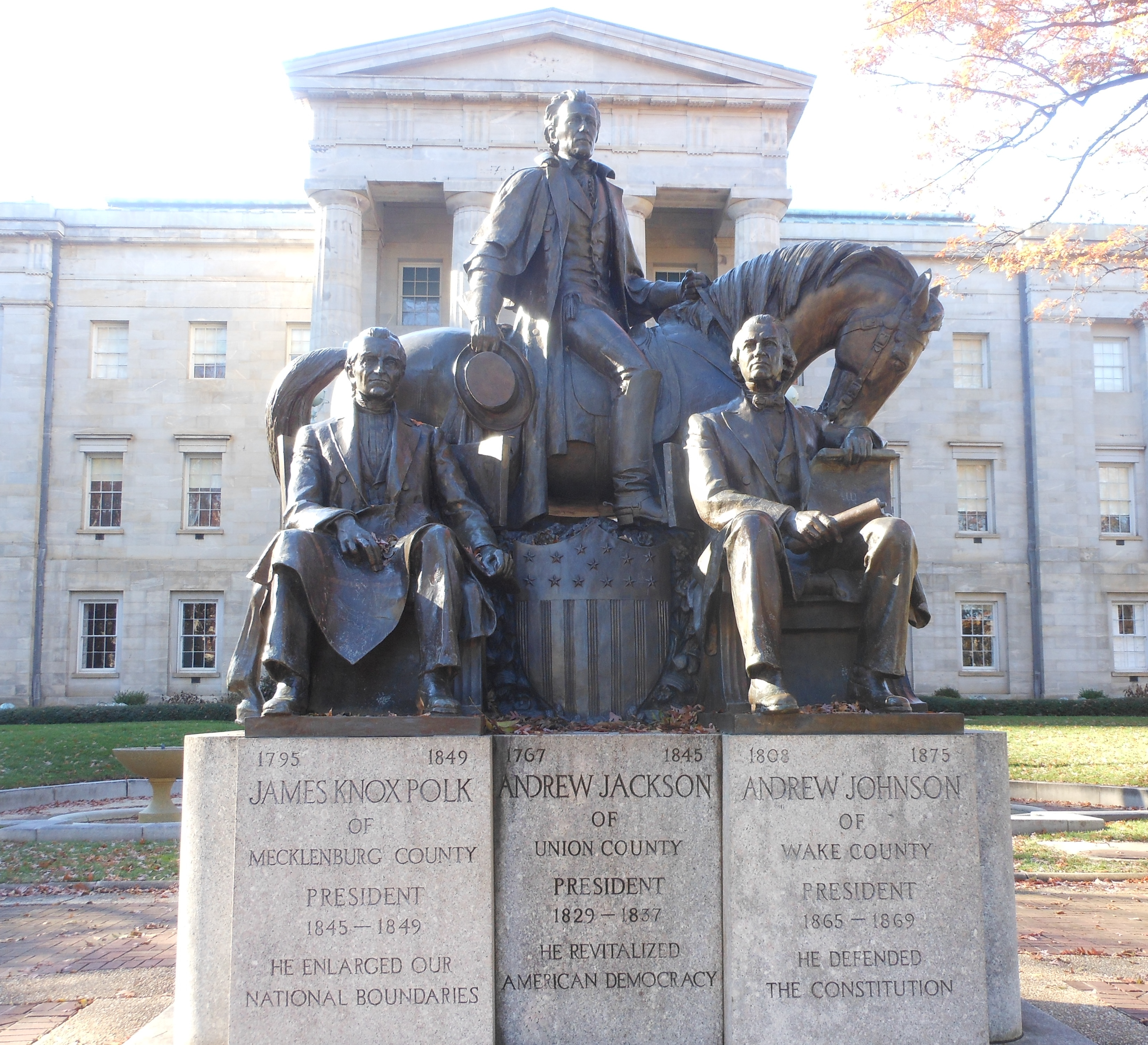
Presidents North Carolina Gave the Nation

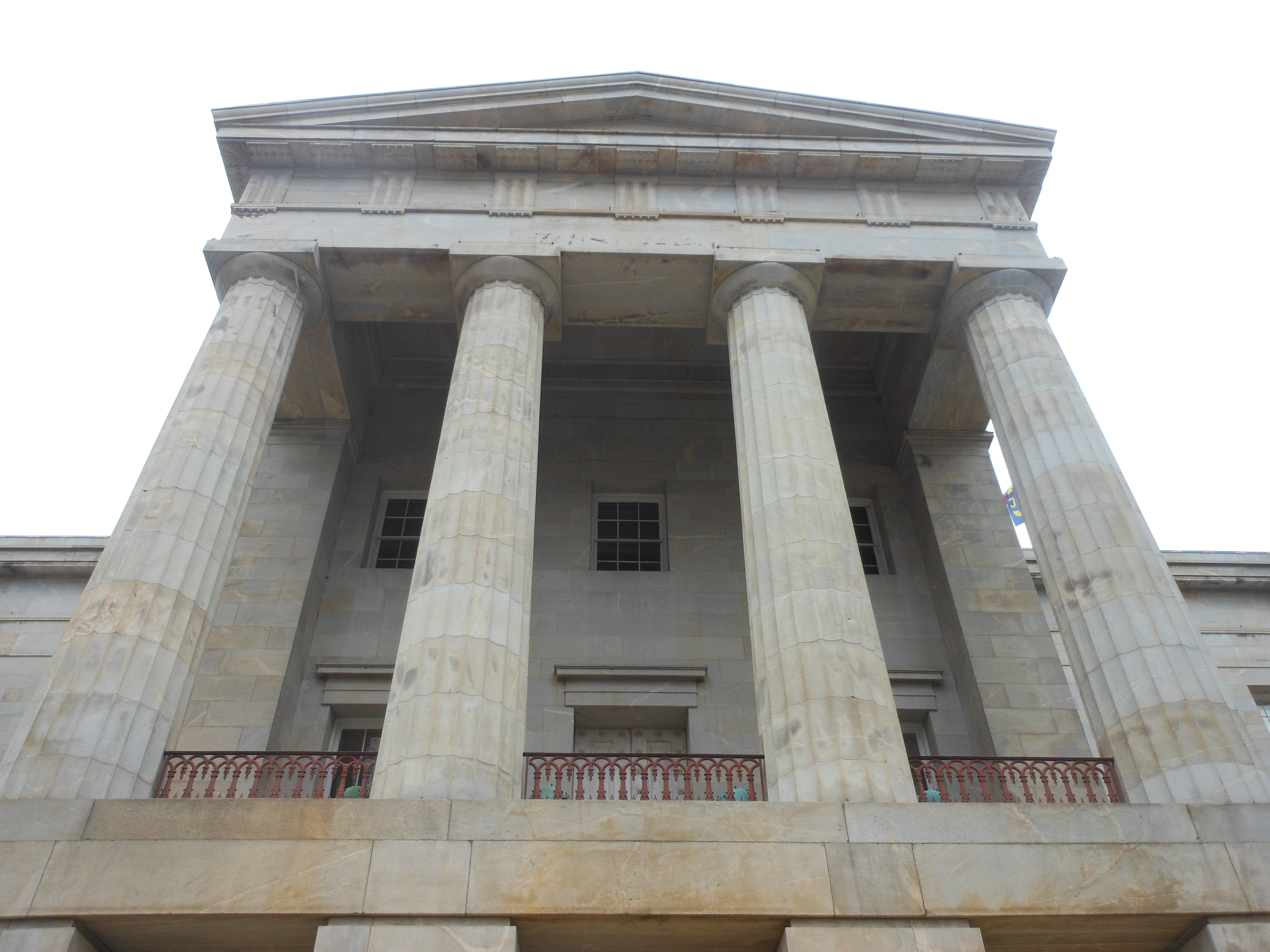
Classical Greek Facade of North Carolina State Capitol

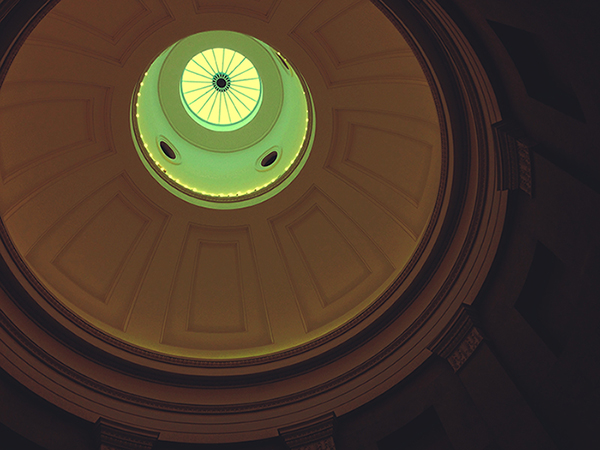
Interior view of dome.

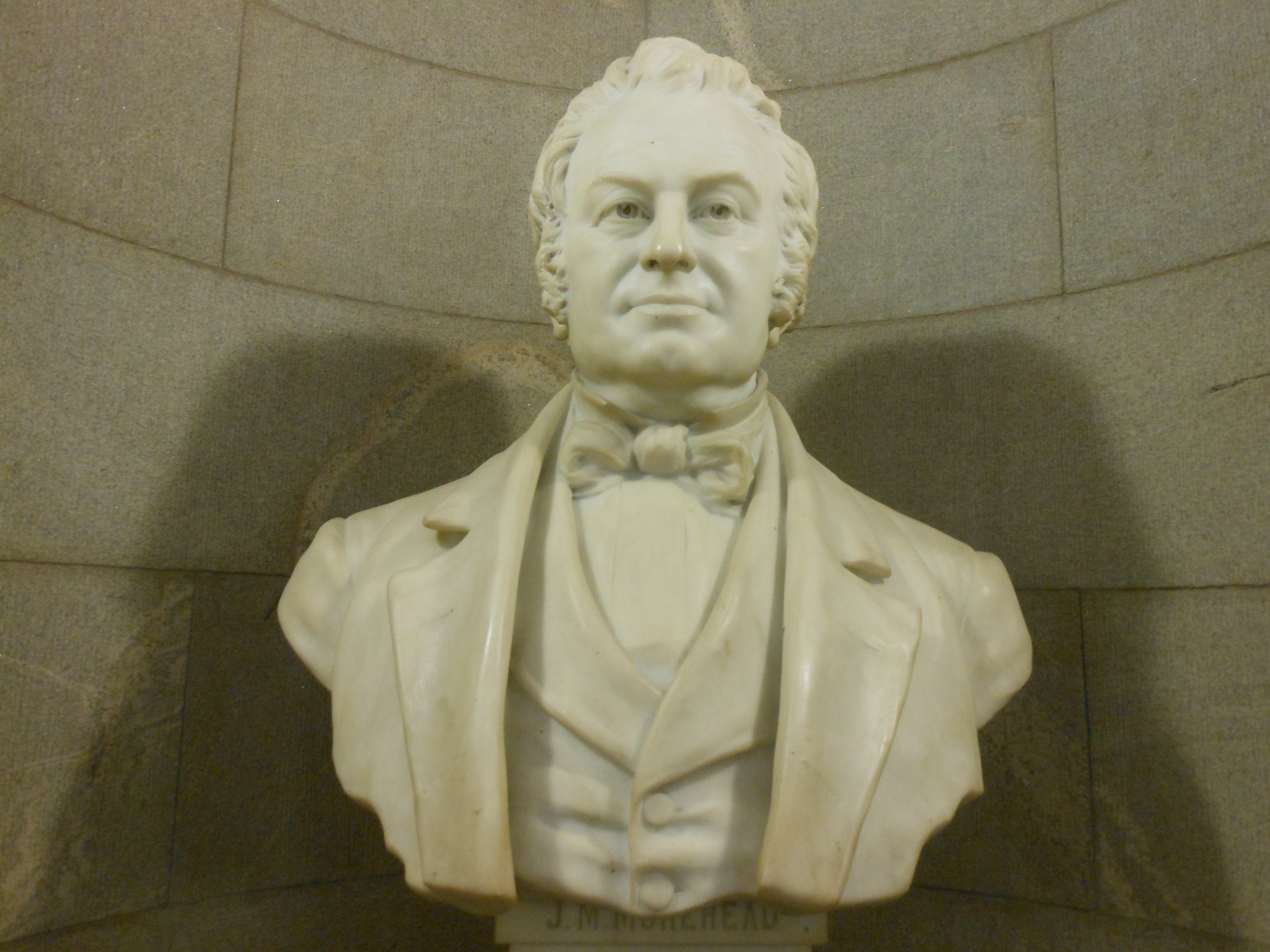
Bust of Governor of North Carolina John Motley Morehead

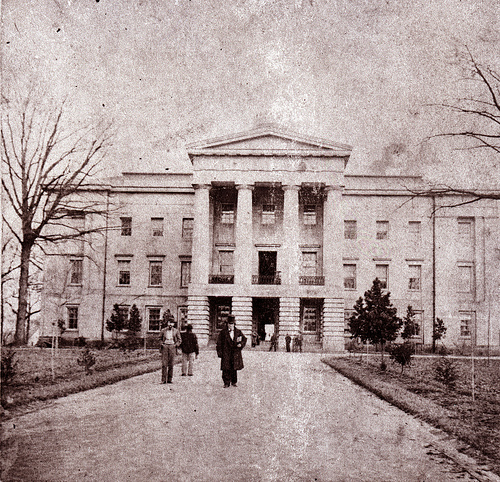
North Carolina State Capitol In 1861

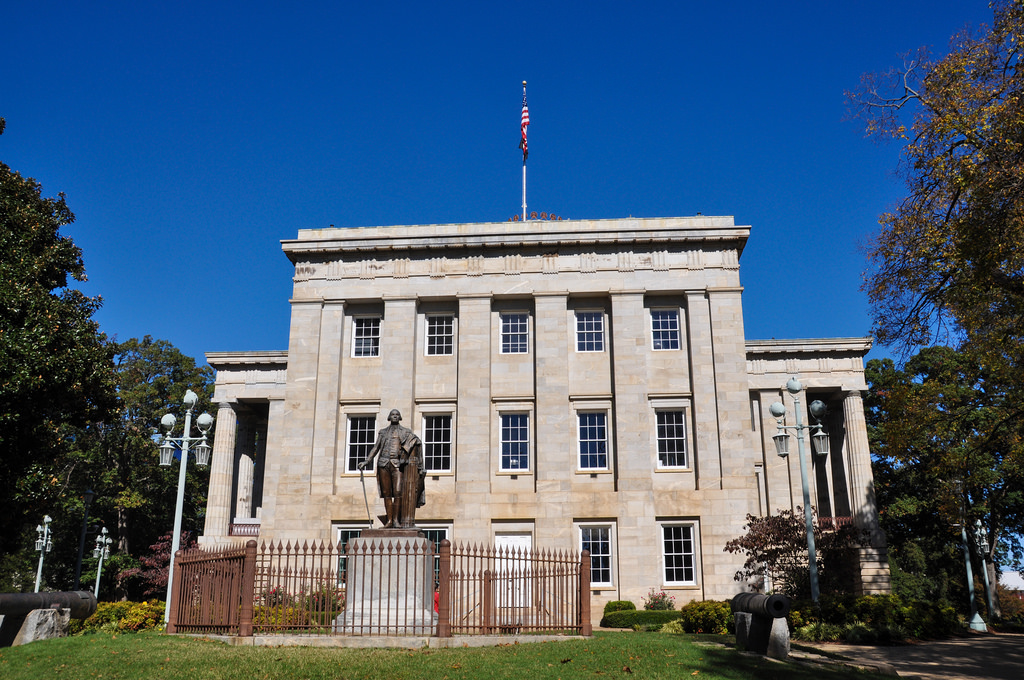
South side of the State Capitol, 2016

== See also ==
- List of North Carolina state legislatures
- List of National Historic Landmarks in North Carolina
- National Register of Historic Places listings in Wake County, North Carolina
- List of state and territorial capitols in the United States
