= List of named minor planets: L =

This is a partial list of named minor planets, containing all those starting with the letter L, as of 9 November 2026. It is ordered in a case-insensitive, alphabetical manner and contains a total of 1,222 entries. Grey minor planets have no article and redirect to the list of minor planets instead (see List of minor planets § Main index).

== L ==
- 7499 L'Aquila
- 21000 L'Encyclopédie
- 9853 l'Épée
- 10057 L'Obel
- 13964 La Billardière
- 315218 La Boétie
- 159164 La Cañada
- 8221 La Condamine
- 13118 La Harpe
- 53093 La Orotava
- 1008 La Paz
- 13560 La Pérouse
- 1029 La Plata
- 164589 La Sagra
- 7082 La Serena
- 2187 La Silla
- 10211 La Spezia
- 8539 Laban
- 8788 Labeyrie
- 14244 Labnow
- 402008 Laborfalviróza
- 19379 Labrecque
- 5152 Labs
- 549228 Labuda
- 4943 Lac d'Orient
- 336 Lacadiera
- 9135 Lacaille
- 418419 Lacanto
- 468044 Lacatus
- 145962 Lacchini
- 10694 Lacerda
- 95771 Lachat
- 120 Lachesis
- 15215 Lachlanmaclean
- 359426 Lacks
- 208 Lacrimosa
- 1851 Lacroute
- 19762 Lacrowder
- 10477 Lacumparsita
- 2832 Lada
- 181298 Ladányi
- 29204 Ladegast
- 11326 Ladislavschmied
- 2574 Ladoga
- 291847 Ladoix
- 235990 Laennec
- 11252 Laërtes
- 39 Laetitia
- 15375 Laetitiafoglia
- 23244 Lafayette
- 613419 Lafayettequartet
- 31513 Lafazan
- 8114 Lafcadio
- 19595 Lafer-Sousa
- 16085 Laffan
- 184275 Laffra
- 35703 Lafiascaia
- 5780 Lafontaine
- 486898 LaForge
- 19397 Lagarini
- 2875 Lagerkvist
- 11061 Lagerlöf
- 7857 Lagerros
- 46644 Lagia
- 18602 Lagillespie
- 30576 Lago
- 1006 Lagrangea
- 20054 Lágrimaríos
- 1412 Lagrula
- 26357 Laguerre
- 1498 Lahti
- 6687 Lahulla
- 11100 Lai
- 26743 Laichinglung
- 21672 Laichunju
- 597966 Laihe
- 20473 Lainey
- 16192 Laird
- 25015 Lairdclose
- 836955 Lais
- 23280 Laitsaita
- 188816 Lajuanmoore
- 10379 Lake Placid
- 29186 Lake Tekapo
- 20031 Lakehead
- 25428 Lakhanpal
- 189320 Lakitsferenc
- 32044 Lakmazaheri
- 26973 Lála
- 822 Lalage
- 9136 Lalande
- 18857 Lalchandani
- 18669 Lalitpatel
- 8347 Lallaward
- 35420 Lallemand
- 5447 Lallement
- 7296 Lamarck
- 32730 Lamarr
- 16089 Lamb
- 13238 Lambeaux
- 187 Lamberta
- 175629 Lambertini
- 15624 Lamberton
- 132719 Lambey
- 2861 Lambrecht
- 64288 Lamchiuying
- 110074 Lamchunhei
- 248 Lameia
- 7095 Lamettrie
- 8368 Lamont
- 13097 Lamoraal
- 14846 Lampedusa
- 30847 Lampert
- 575498 Lampérthgyula
- 393 Lampetia
- 1767 Lampland
- 55678 Lampos
- 34859 Lamshanmuk
- 4111 Lamy
- 6892 Lana
- 25953 Lanairlett
- 12373 Lancearmstrong
- 2041 Lancelot
- 8417 Lancetaylor
- 191341 Lánczos
- 2142 Landau
- 73699 Landaupfalz
- 10425 Landfermann
- 3132 Landgraf
- 2381 Landi
- 8136 Landis
- 15072 Landolt
- 27446 Landoni
- 33591 Landsberger
- 39290 Landsman
- 14274 Landstreet
- 4770 Lane
- 22167 Lane-Cline
- 22875 Lanejackson
- 551900 Laneways
- 20768 Langberg
- 183294 Langbroek
- 166444 Lange
- 732272 Langejans
- 19142 Langemarck
- 54403 Langersek
- 5290 Langevin
- 740495 Langill
- 58186 Langkavel
- 15516 Langleben
- 3866 Langley
- 12287 Langres
- 31129 Langyatai
- 6928 Lanna
- 61913 Lanning
- 12173 Lansbergen
- 17944 Lansbury
- 300150 Lantan
- 643975 Lanthimos
- 24232 Lanthrum
- 11799 Lantz
- 6289 Lanusei
- 392225 Lanzarote
- 5504 Lanzerotti
- 683 Lanzia
- 3240 Laocoon
- 1011 Laodamia
- 507 Laodica
- 5257 Laogonus
- 6997 Laomedon
- 12279 Laon
- 7854 Laotse
- 2912 Lapalma
- 428259 Laphil
- 3215 Lapko
- 4628 Laplace
- 7912 Lapovok
- 2397 Lappajärvi
- 1504 Lappeenranta
- 8441 Lapponica
- 545619 Lapuška
- 1819 Laputa
- 12042 Laques
- 145491 Larakaufmann
- 19817 Larashelton
- 10126 Lärbro
- 26691 Lareegardner
- 12073 Larimer
- 1895 Larink
- 3940 Larion
- 773906 Larisaromanova
- 1162 Larissa
- 335292 Larrey
- 30440 Larry
- 22621 Larrybartel
- 10274 Larryevans
- 18739 Larryhu
- 45518 Larrykrozel
- 112313 Larrylines
- 126183 Larrymitchell
- 45641 Larrypuzio
- 18873 Larryrobinson
- 12471 Larryscherr
- 14598 Larrysmith
- 16920 Larrywalker
- 8568 Larrywilson
- 8459 Larsbergknut
- 3690 Larson
- 13052 Las Casas
- 60186 Las Cruces
- 82332 Las Vegas
- 30150 Laseminara
- 554959 Lasica
- 7441 Láska
- 20074 Laskerschueler
- 6128 Lasorda
- 2636 Lassell
- 12257 Lassine
- 7383 Lassovszky
- 46514 Lasswitz
- 13740 Lastrucci
- 33287 Lasue
- 14617 Lasvergnas
- 18043 Laszkowska
- 15564 Lateef
- 23040 Latham
- 35403 Latimer
- 132874 Latinovits
- 639 Latona
- 24047 Latorredelsole
- 30775 Lattu
- 567580 Latuni
- 1284 Latvia
- 10811 Lau
- 13793 Laubernasconi
- 3135 Lauer
- 353404 Laugalys
- 1597 Laugier
- 23893 Lauman
- 7167 Laupheim
- 467 Laura
- 15742 Laurabassi
- 134138 Laurabayley
- 52570 Lauraco
- 126247 Laurafaggioli
- 455887 Laurafallon
- 20642 Laurajohnson
- 20814 Laurajones
- 48909 Laurake
- 28677 Laurakowalski
- 597470 Lauraparker
- 20475 Lauraparro
- 33400 Laurapierson
- 34365 Laurareilly
- 343413 Lauratoyama
- 18709 Laurawong
- 2865 Laurel
- 361690 Laurelanmaurer
- 51827 Laurelclark
- 220886 Lauren-Yuill
- 5107 Laurenbacall
- 52965 Laurencebentz
- 17144 Laurenchen
- 33875 Laurencooney
- 33559 Laurencooper
- 27411 Laurenhall
- 32153 Laurenmcgraw
- 543581 Laurenrubyjane
- 18953 Laurensmith
- 90533 Laurentblind
- 25127 Laurentbrunetto
- 162 Laurentia
- 5819 Lauretta
- 270588 Laurieanderson
- 149115 Lauriecantillo
- 23168 Lauriefletch
- 20566 Laurielee
- 23852 Laurierumker
- 20035 Lauriroche
- 103422 Laurisirén
- 103421 Laurmatt
- 1938 Lausanna
- 25065 Lautakkin
- 25073 Lautakshing
- 55381 Lautakwah
- 2976 Lautaro
- 30827 Lautenschläger
- 434325 Lautréamont
- 39332 Lauwaiming
- 34636 Lauwingkai
- 14424 Laval
- 18774 Lavanture
- 19263 Lavater
- 37609 LaVelle
- 12542 Laver
- 2103 Laverna
- 10215 Lavilledemirmont
- 593195 Lavinaahmed
- 21915 Lavins
- 21550 Laviolette
- 6826 Lavoisier
- 1401 Lavonne
- 44574 Lavoratti
- 7322 Lavrentina
- 2354 Lavrov
- 17079 Lavrovsky
- 30578 Lawless
- 4969 Lawrence
- 204602 Lawrencebrown
- 45688 Lawrencestacey
- 25326 Lawrencesun
- 14584 Lawson
- 34840 Lawwaikuen
- 22138 Laynrichards
- 3660 Lazarev
- 14428 Lazaridis
- 212692 Lazauskaitė
- 18965 Lazenby
- 29987 Lazhang
- 20513 Lazio
- 32628 Lazorik
- 34838 Lazowski
- 368588 Lazrek
- 633909 Lazutkin
- 3602 Lazzaro
- 19132 Le Clézio
- 9285 Le Corre
- 10233 Le Creusot
- 145445 Le Floch
- 12718 Le Gentil
- 29187 Le Monnier
- 20788 Le Montagner
- 58460 Le Mouélic
- 5342 Le Poole
- 16414 Le Procope
- 113208 Lea
- 157258 Leach
- 283461 Leacipaola
- 20485 Léaferellec
- 19572 Leahmarie
- 235750 Leahroberson
- 34457 Leahroberts
- 7958 Leakey
- 19426 Leal
- 236728 Leandri
- 96623 Leani
- 26527 Leasure
- 95852 Leatherbarrow
- 21673 Leatherman
- 5383 Leavitt
- 2342 Lebedev
- 5076 Lebedev-Kumach
- 3629 Lebedinskij
- 26908 Lebesgue
- 189944 Leblanc
- 3439 Lebofsky
- 10838 Lebon
- 25711 Lebovits
- 18100 Lebreton
- 5524 Lecacheux
- 4417 Lecar
- 32945 Lecce
- 279377 Lechmankiewicz
- 274290 Lechnerödön
- 355276 Leclair
- 3755 Lecointe
- 52271 Lecorbusier
- 414283 Lécureuil
- 38 Leda
- 403563 Ledbetter
- 2444 Lederle
- 85185 Lederman
- 798772 Ledóchowska
- 30221 LeDonne
- 12261 Ledouanier
- 30389 Ledoux
- 4749 Ledzeppelin
- 3155 Lee
- 214290 Leeannmarshall
- 22836 Leeannragasa
- 21554 Leechaohsi
- 25561 Leehyunki
- 30257 Leejanel
- 15611 Leejoonyoung
- 29656 Leejoseph
- 703111 Leejungpin
- 110073 Leeonki
- 18124 Leeperry
- 34576 Leeshangjung
- 218692 Leesnyder
- 94228 Leesuikwan
- 3443 Leetsungdao
- 181569 Leetyphoon
- 104210 Leeupton
- 2766 Leeuwenhoek
- 28417 Leewei
- 99503 Leewonchul
- 576186 Lefebvre
- 12241 Lefort
- 26909 Lefschetz
- 19458 Legault
- 26950 Legendre
- 25165 Leget
- 12075 Legg
- 1261 Legia
- 85317 Lehár
- 24346 Lehienphan
- 691 Lehigh
- 14550 Lehký
- 6504 Lehmbruck
- 31387 Lehoucq
- 89956 Leibacher
- 5149 Leibniz
- 31516 Leibowitz
- 12490 Leiden
- 9223 Leifandersson
- 18826 Leifer
- 17900 Leiferman
- 26240 Leigheriks
- 870437 Leilani
- 10775 Leipzig
- 27303 Leitner
- 225276 Leïtos
- 6545 Leitus
- 10810 Lejsturojr
- 541132 Leleākūhonua
- 167208 Lelekovice
- 5519 Lellouch
- 2548 Leloir
- 41979 Lelumacri
- 3836 Lem
- 11897 Lemaire
- 1565 Lemaître
- 213637 Lemarchal
- 16265 Lemay
- 4561 Lemeshev
- 14327 Lemke
- 160000 Lemmon
- 243002 Lemmy
- 20486 Lemos
- 22758 Lemp
- 47171 Lempo
- 15031 Lemus
- 789 Lena
- 28989 Lenaadams
- 12187 Lenagoryunova
- 7400 Lenau
- 30525 Lenbright
- 3817 Lencarter
- 3796 Lene
- 592710 Lenghu
- 6287 Lenham
- 39536 Lenhof
- 2046 Leningrad
- 10390 Lenka
- 27522 Lenkenyon
- 34488 Lennartresch
- 4147 Lennon
- 337380 Lenormand
- 306191 Lentegábor
- 195405 Lentyler
- 100047 Leobaeck
- 31376 Leobauersfeld
- 969 Leocadia
- 6479 Leoconnolly
- 30166 Leodeng
- 3572 Leogoldberg
- 145166 Leojematt
- 34249 Leolo
- 319 Leona
- 53435 Leonard
- 24732 Leonardcohen
- 9082 Leonardmartin
- 3000 Leonardo
- 251642 Leonardodicaprio
- 65770 Leonardotestoni
- 1378 Leonce
- 19096 Leonfridman
- 9903 Leonhardt
- 18750 Leonidakimov
- 7715 Leonidarosino
- 2782 Leonidas
- 728 Leonisis
- 29464 Leonmiš
- 78221 Leonmow
- 696 Leonora
- 5154 Leonov
- 159351 Leonpascal
- 11977 Leonrisoldi
- 395231 Leónscott
- 3793 Leonteus
- 844 Leontina
- 21397 Leontovich
- 27932 Leonyao
- 8081 Leopardi
- 893 Leopoldina
- 251325 Leopoldjosefine
- 32486 Leospohl
- 334756 Leövey
- 2795 Lepage
- 7720 Lepaute
- 55733 Lepsius
- 10106 Lergrav
- 2222 Lermontov
- 93102 Leroy
- 4922 Leshin
- 82937 Lesicki
- 29311 Lesire
- 4741 Leskov
- 13690 Lesleymartin
- 26234 Leslibrinson
- 20861 Lesliebeh
- 5571 Lesliegreen
- 25034 Lesliemarie
- 17242 Leslieyoung
- 22162 Leslijohnson
- 3482 Lesnaya
- 35350 Lespaul
- 33224 Lesrogers
- 213197 Lessac-Chenen
- 25531 Lessek
- 7425 Lessing
- 33910 Lestarge
- 14583 Lester
- 15093 Lestermackey
- 6939 Lestone
- 2616 Lesya
- 1264 Letaba
- 109879 Letelier
- 22571 Letianzhang
- 13895 Letkasagjonica
- 68 Leto
- 27899 Letterman
- 5827 Letunov
- 6266 Letzel
- 8971 Leucocephala
- 8436 Leucopsis
- 8754 Leucorodia
- 8976 Leucura
- 11351 Leucus
- 5950 Leukippos
- 35 Leukothea
- 16142 Leung
- 32618 Leungkamcheung
- 1361 Leuschneria
- 2810 Lev Tolstoj
- 21555 Levary
- 6170 Levasseur
- 1997 Leverrier
- 723217 Levesque
- 12473 Levi-Civita
- 9722 Levi-Montalcini
- 45700 Levi-Setti
- 22647 Lévi-Strauss
- 8813 Leviathan
- 2076 Levin
- 7885 Levine
- 6909 Levison
- 3566 Levitan
- 22019 Leviticusalewis
- 26075 Levitsvet
- 204831 Levski
- 3673 Levy
- 4125 Lew Allen
- 24189 Lewasserman
- 250354 Lewicdeparis
- 13609 Lewicki
- 4796 Lewis
- 6984 Lewiscarroll
- 508440 Lewishamilton
- 741821 Lewisknee
- 81790 Lewislove
- 6916 Lewispearce
- 22505 Lewit
- 17579 Lewkopelew
- 7087 Lewotsky
- 399979 Lewseaman
- 18747 Lexcen
- 2004 Lexell
- 35977 Lexington
- 33905 Leyajoykutty
- 34770 Leyendecker
- 3397 Leyla
- 8466 Leyrat
- 7859 Lhasa
- 40206 Lhenice
- 20487 Lhotka
- 954 Li
- 23745 Liadawley
- 48295 Liamgroah
- 32088 Liamwallace
- 30194 Liamyoung
- 333055 Liang
- 185209 Liangdongcai
- 121001 Liangshanxichang
- 663468 Liaochichun
- 2503 Liaoning
- 616690 Liaoxi
- 23249 Liaoyenting
- 110288 Libai
- 13526 Libbrecht
- 5672 Libby
- 120121 Libbyadelman
- 11747 Libbykamen
- 33230 Libbyrobertson
- 4823 Libenice
- 771 Libera
- 6417 Liberati
- 17960 Liberatore
- 125 Liberatrix
- 1816 Liberia
- 2546 Libitina
- 10281 Libourel
- 25659 Liboynton
- 264 Libussa
- 1268 Libya
- 17919 Licandro
- 16242 Licato
- 18151 Licchelli
- 16165 Licht
- 7970 Lichtenberg
- 152320 Lichtenknecker
- 23063 Lichtman
- 22905 Liciniotoso
- 15088 Licitra
- 1951 Lick
- 1107 Lictoria
- 3812 Lidaksum
- 17670 Liddell
- 3322 Lidiya
- 4236 Lidov
- 161207 Lidz
- 26955 Lie
- 7696 Liebe
- 12329 Liebermann
- 22534 Lieblich
- 17889 Liechty
- 5923 Liedeke
- 543060 Liefke
- 34863 Lientang
- 678676 Liepāja
- 3454 Lieske
- 13557 Lievetruwant
- 19155 Lifeson
- 28201 Lifubin
- 20321 Lightdonovan
- 20015 Liguori
- 356 Liguria
- 544033 Lihsing
- 5411 Liia
- 14656 Lijiang
- 21496 Lijianyang
- 192178 Lijieshou
- 18001 Lijing
- 2877 Likhachev
- 73638 Likhanov
- 785648 Likho
- 31905 Likinpong
- 239611 Likwohting
- 213 Lilaea
- 34771 Lilauren
- 132741 Liliacapocaccia
- 27775 Lilialmanzor
- 216780 Lilianne
- 28611 Liliapopova
- 13610 Lilienthal
- 59238 Lilin
- 2346 Lilio
- 1181 Lilith
- 1092 Lilium
- 3222 Liller
- 756 Lilliana
- 28557 Lillianchin
- 333207 Lilliannguyen
- 23234 Lilliantsai
- 34823 Lillipetersen
- 2952 Lilliputia
- 1003 Lilofee
- 3609 Liloketai
- 595901 Lilybeaurepaire
- 33886 Lilydeveau
- 545651 Lilyjames
- 32021 Lilyjenkins
- 30312 Lilyliu
- 10867 Lima
- 1383 Limburgia
- 25562 Limdarren
- 663467 Limeishu
- 32275 Limichael
- 10713 Limorenko
- 8765 Limosa
- 1490 Limpopo
- 5539 Limporyen
- 31928 Limzhengtheng
- 468 Lina
- 290127 Linakostenko
- 46702 Linapucci
- 33515 Linbohan
- 20828 Linchen
- 26425 Linchichieh
- 38821 Linchinghsia
- 175451 Linchisheng
- 3153 Lincoln
- 7169 Linda
- 2686 Linda Susan
- 22026 Lindabillings
- 204764 Lindaburke
- 25383 Lindacker
- 542600 Lindahall
- 71971 Lindaketcham
- 134092 Lindaleematthias
- 27327 Lindaplante
- 26271 Lindapuster
- 14334 Lindarueger
- 26285 Lindaspahn
- 56975 Lindaspilker
- 117381 Lindaweiland
- 14696 Lindawilliams
- 26007 Lindazhou
- 1448 Lindbladia
- 3865 Lindbloom
- 28072 Lindbowerman
- 1407 Lindelöf
- 828 Lindemannia
- 9322 Lindenau
- 3204 Lindgren
- 21678 Lindner
- 19542 Lindperkins
- 28678 Lindquester
- 31684 Lindsay
- 133773 Lindsaykeller
- 22794 Lindsayleona
- 242516 Lindseystirling
- 5281 Lindstrom
- 20303 Lindwestrick
- 118401 LINEAR
- 36037 Linenschmidt
- 24218 Linfrederick
- 26210 Lingas
- 20638 Lingchen
- 21364 Lingpan
- 30244 Linhpham
- 89909 Linie
- 20105 Linjingming
- 3550 Link
- 34473 Linkairui
- 22144 Linmichaels
- 8898 Linnaea
- 7412 Linnaeus
- 7416 Linnankoski
- 350185 Linnell
- 498797 Linshiawshin
- 316020 Linshuhow
- 3474 Linsley
- 20822 Lintingnien
- 4937 Lintott
- 30168 Linusfreyer
- 9885 Linux
- 296351 Linyongbin
- 210230 Linyuanpei
- 7491 Linzerag
- 7145 Linzexu
- 1469 Linzia
- 974 Lioba
- 18079 Lion-Stoppato
- 9504 Lionel
- 26960 Liouville
- 212797 Lipei
- 11656 Lipno
- 16861 Lipovetsky
- 9640 Lippens
- 31338 Lipperhey
- 846 Lipperta
- 619356 Lippmann
- 2641 Lipschutz
- 23701 Liqibin
- 34772 Lirachel
- 414 Liriope
- 16666 Liroma
- 27510 Lisaactor
- 30110 Lisabreton
- 590377 Lisacampbell
- 28780 Lisadeaver
- 85485 Lisagermany
- 161699 Lisahardaway
- 34313 Lisahevner
- 410912 Lisakaroline
- 63680 Lisaloring
- 30043 Lisamichaels
- 24135 Lisann
- 33929 Lisaprato
- 133068 Lisaschulze
- 12604 Lisatate
- 218069 Lisaturner
- 22906 Lisauckis
- 28807 Lisawaller
- 25514 Lisawu
- 5320 Lisbeth
- 13599 Lisbon
- 31464 Liscinsky
- 3976 Lise
- 9272 Liseleje
- 4757 Liselotte
- 26738 Lishizhen
- 137039 Lisiguang
- 8064 Lisitsa
- 20489 Lissauer
- 4004 Listʹev
- 3910 Liszt
- 96612 Litipei
- 5015 Litke
- 26328 Litomyšl
- 26993 Littlewood
- 303265 Littmann
- 2577 Litva
- 6743 Liu
- 251018 Liubirena
- 207603 Liuchaohan
- 541508 Liucixin
- 25964 Liudavid
- 19874 Liudongyan
- 361712 Liuhui
- 261936 Liulin
- 20823 Liutingchun
- 58605 Liutungsheng
- 248262 Liuxiaobo
- 20817 Liuxiaofeng
- 10070 Liuzongli
- 3006 Livadia
- 18637 Liverdun
- 7170 Livesey
- 73534 Liviasavioli
- 5987 Liviogratton
- 13772 Livius
- 236784 Livorno
- 847420 Livtel
- 3556 Lixiaohua
- 28204 Liyakang
- 6741 Liyuan
- 20846 Liyulin
- 90825 Lizhensheng
- 12997 Lizjensen
- 25715 Lizmariemako
- 25475 Lizrao
- 1062 Ljuba
- 13316 Llano
- 10344 Llanodelhato
- 13705 Llapasset
- 24345 Llaverias
- 47078 Llebaria
- 9900 Llull
- 21007 Lo Campo
- 1858 Lobachevskij
- 1066 Lobelia
- 1937 Locarno
- 33871 Locastillo
- 10874 Locatelli
- 12616 Lochner
- 7010 Locke
- 13493 Lockwood
- 117086 Lóczy
- 5937 Lodén
- 55772 Loder
- 3377 Lodewijk
- 11430 Lodewijkberg
- 21331 Lodovicoferrari
- 85121 Loehde
- 13011 Loeillet
- 30018 Loemele
- 23298 Loewenstein
- 12634 LOFAR
- 7157 Lofgren
- 28916 Logancollins
- 58534 Logos
- 17192 Loharu
- 9505 Lohengrin
- 2501 Lohja
- 1820 Lohmann
- 11434 Lohnert
- 4680 Lohrmann
- 2210 Lois
- 4862 Loke
- 604429 Lokhorst
- 9267 Lokrume
- 463 Lola
- 87097 Lomaki
- 9397 Lombardi
- 6446 Lomberg
- 209054 Lombkató
- 117 Lomia
- 3168 Lomnický Štít
- 1379 Lomonosowa
- 99388 Londialdo
- 8837 London
- 28851 Londonbolsius
- 340891 Londoncommorch
- 12310 Londontario
- 12574 LONEOS
- 214474 Long Island
- 26248 Longenecker
- 35197 Longmire
- 5948 Longo
- 20490 Longobardo
- 95882 Longshaw
- 7131 Longtom
- 34137 Lonnielinda
- 99941 Lonniewege
- 2243 Lönnrot
- 37608 Löns
- 174281 Lonský
- 188061 Loomis
- 19129 Loos
- 4657 Lopez
- 117704 Lopez-Alegria
- 18150 Lopez-Moreno
- 379130 Lopresti
- 5225 Loral
- 235201 Lorántffy
- 1755 Lorbach
- 1287 Lorcia
- 157301 Loreena
- 165 Loreley
- 276681 Loremaes
- 16095 Lorenball
- 3861 Lorenz
- 10938 Lorenzalevy
- 121537 Lorenzdavid
- 29761 Lorenzo
- 135041 Lorenzofranco
- 190730 Lorenzonesi
- 40447 Lorenzoni
- 47473 Lorenzopinna
- 1939 Loretta
- 96263 Lorettacavicchi
- 152290 Lorettaoberheim
- 23122 Lorgat
- 37692 Loribragg
- 22109 Loriehutch
- 35358 Lorifini
- 15618 Lorifritz
- 236617 Loriglaze
- 129328 Loriharrison
- 20214 Lorikenny
- 28163 Lorikim
- 26313 Lorilombardi
- 5735 Loripaul
- 22142 Loripryor
- 22989 Loriskopp
- 35621 Lorius
- 26004 Loriying
- 1114 Lorraine
- 5438 Lorre
- 16103 Lorsolomon
- 16418 Lortzing
- 10476 Los Molinos
- 1326 Losaka
- 12320 Loschmidt
- 28681 Loseke
- 126246 Losignore
- 181136 Losonczrita
- 340579 Losse
- 2673 Lossignol
- 7688 Lothar
- 429 Lotis
- 3489 Lottie
- 8298 Loubna
- 9584 Louchheim
- 15149 Loufaix
- 214719 Louges
- 3897 Louhi
- 25890 Louisburg
- 188446 Louischevrolet
- 2556 Louise
- 19778 Louisgarcia
- 34239 Louisgolowich
- 38018 Louisneefs
- 3211 Louispharailda
- 7625 Louisspohr
- 270553 Loureed
- 4513 Louvre
- 9697 Louwman
- 868 Lova
- 73511 Lovas
- 161215 Loveday
- 61342 Lovejoy
- 333101 Lovelace
- 51663 Lovelock
- 133832 Loveridge
- 5943 Lovi
- 2750 Loviisa
- 432971 Loving
- 4091 Lowe
- 1886 Lowell
- 129050 Lowellcogburn
- 12164 Lowellgreen
- 28052 Lowellputnam
- 4045 Lowengrub
- 8620 Lowkevrudolph
- 10739 Lowman
- 12984 Lowry
- 3589 Loyola
- 16900 Lozère
- 17358 Lozino-Lozinskij
- 52422 LPL
- 20492 Luanaliberato
- 1431 Luanda
- 102536 Luanenjie
- 7506 Lub
- 207585 Lubar
- 2318 Lubarsky
- 5108 Lübeck
- 65885 Lubenow
- 336108 Luberon
- 20285 Lubin
- 3630 Lubomír
- 2900 Luboš Perek
- 27978 Lubosluka
- 34139 Lucabarcelo
- 120102 Lucabenetti
- 198616 Lucabracali
- 24969 Lucafini
- 39871 Lucagrazzini
- 30119 Lucamatone
- 42697 Lucapaolini
- 37627 Lucaparmitano
- 141772 Lucapeyron
- 343057 Lucaravenni
- 25259 Lucarnold
- 19262 Lucarubini
- 9349 Lucas
- 21509 Lucascavin
- 21628 Lucashof
- 120141 Lucaslara
- 22538 Lucasmoller
- 33323 Lucaspaganini
- 35326 Lucastrabla
- 17357 Lucataliano
- 15497 Lucca
- 49296 Lucdettwiller
- 1292 Luce
- 14509 Lučenec
- 1935 Lucerna
- 26530 Lucferreira
- 23327 Luchernandez
- 236484 Luchijen
- 222 Lucia
- 31911 Luciafauth
- 149195 Lucianaziino
- 15817 Lucianotesi
- 1176 Lucidor
- 171256 Lucieconstant
- 180932 Luciegreen
- 56041 Luciendumont
- 1892 Lucienne
- 1930 Lucifer
- 146 Lucina
- 44000 Lucka
- 281 Lucretia
- 6240 Lucretius Carus
- 100924 Luctuymans
- 3021 Lucubratio
- 32605 Lucy
- 15494 Lucylake
- 9282 Lucylim
- 1158 Luda
- 6584 Luděkpešek
- 8184 Luderic
- 27865 Ludgerfroebel
- 7081 Ludibunda
- 4601 Ludkewycz
- 675 Ludmilla
- 227928 Ludoferrière
- 6112 Ludolfschultz
- 10438 Ludolph
- 292 Ludovica
- 23520 Ludwigbechstein
- 25029 Ludwighesse
- 11854 Ludwigrichter
- 658398 Lufonds
- 21919 Luga
- 1936 Lugano
- 1133 Lugduna
- 7723 Lugger
- 217628 Lugh
- 7393 Luginbuhl
- 6080 Lugmair
- 4583 Lugo
- 125071 Lugosi
- 58418 Luguhu
- 246132 Lugyny
- 8808 Luhmann
- 5538 Luichewoo
- 595480 Luidens
- 14947 Luigibussolino
- 185733 Luigicolzani
- 12384 Luigimartella
- 37640 Luiginegrelli
- 58691 Luigisannino
- 114740 Luigitatto
- 383622 Luigivolta
- 599 Luisa
- 12993 Luisafernanda
- 12366 Luisapla
- 56100 Luisapolli
- 333106 Lujan
- 3844 Lujiaxi
- 541992 Lukácsbéla
- 31912 Lukasgrafner
- 31917 Lukashohne
- 27114 Lukasiewicz
- 16090 Lukaszewski
- 25175 Lukeandraka
- 8711 Lukeasher
- 31398 Lukedaly
- 34784 Lukelong
- 6654 Luleå
- 145523 Lulin
- 8676 Lully
- 141 Lumen
- 177853 Lumezzane
- 775 Lumière
- 5523 Luminet
- 2600 Lumme
- 10132 Lummelunda
- 2446 Lunacharsky
- 1067 Lunaria
- 11934 Lundgren
- 809 Lundia
- 1334 Lundmarka
- 7047 Lundström
- 100604 Lundy
- 10801 Lüneburg
- 103966 Luni
- 3208 Lunn
- 333210 Lunning
- 15555 Luochihi
- 204711 Luojialun
- 90919 Luoliaofu
- 16757 Luoxiahong
- 239200 Luoyang
- 333110 Lupe
- 3210 Lupishko
- 6087 Lupo
- 249520 Luppino
- 222032 Lupton
- 555955 Lurçat
- 18501 Luria
- 713 Luscinia
- 8960 Luscinioides
- 39516 Lusigny
- 500170 Lusitano
- 25565 Lusiyang
- 4386 Lüst
- 91023 Lutan
- 24250 Luteolson
- 21 Lutetia
- 251621 Lüthen
- 1303 Luthera
- 444411 Lutherbeegle
- 3856 Lutskij
- 19598 Luttrell
- 7230 Lutz
- 20493 Lutzhecht
- 5430 Luu
- 26728 Luwenqi
- 2713 Luxembourg
- 20501 Luxiaoping
- 110296 Luxor
- 233547 Luxun
- 20830 Luyajia
- 4776 Luyi
- 1964 Luyten
- 5096 Luzin
- 2321 Lužnice
- 2164 Lyalya
- 5415 Lyanzuridi
- 4728 Lyapidevskij
- 5324 Lyapunov
- 542509 Lyatoshynsky
- 9694 Lycomedes
- 110 Lydia
- 458123 Lydiabenecke
- 34456 Lydiareznik
- 1028 Lydina
- 917 Lyka
- 4792 Lykaon
- 10018 Lykawka
- 12773 Lyman
- 7824 Lynch
- 18235 Lynden-Bell
- 157332 Lynette
- 43768 Lynevans
- 4358 Lynn
- 37349 Lynnaequick
- 13644 Lynnanderson
- 37588 Lynnecox
- 24024 Lynnejohnson
- 10297 Lynnejones
- 25994 Lynnelleye
- 27445 Lynnlane
- 49382 Lynnokamoto
- 24304 Lynnrice
- 32619 Lynnsawyer
- 18663 Lynnta
- 41058 Lynxpardinus
- 22597 Lynzielinski
- 9381 Lyon
- 292991 Lyonne
- 2452 Lyot
- 21408 Lyrahaas
- 31323 Lysá hora
- 5984 Lysippus
- 897 Lysistrata
- 18120 Lytvynenko
- 6203 Lyubamoroz
- 216439 Lyubertsy
- 10761 Lyubimets
- 3108 Lyubov
- 9717 Lyudvasilia
- 2204 Lyyli
- 15699 Lyytinen
- 6010 Lyzenga
back to top

== See also ==
- List of minor planet discoverers
- List of observatory codes
- Meanings of minor planet names § Index
