= List of named minor planets: E =

This is a partial list of named minor planets, containing all those starting with the letter E, as of 9 November 2026. It is ordered in a case-insensitive, alphabetical manner and contains a total of 756 entries. Grey minor planets have no article and redirect to the list of minor planets instead (see List of minor planets § Main index).

== E ==
- 6191 Eades
- 114156 Eamonlittle
- 3895 Earhart
- 7275 Earlcarpenter
- 79871 Earthrise
- 11691 Easterwood
- 1205 Ebella
- 8872 Ebenum
- 425442 Eberstadt
- 24825 Ebeshireiko
- 7791 Ebicykl
- 5134 Ebilson
- 36472 Ebina
- 6308 Ebisuzaki
- 12383 Eboshi
- 58569 Eboshiyamakouen
- 37391 Ebre
- 28524 Ebright
- 60558 Echeclus
- 11887 Echemmon
- 30708 Echepolos
- 423205 Echezeaux
- 136743 Echigo
- 13229 Echion
- 65894 Echizenmisaki
- 4415 Echnaton
- 60 Echo
- 12131 Echternach
- 1750 Eckert
- 11241 Eckhout
- 328477 Eckstein
- 12391 Ecoadachi
- 10792 Ecuador
- 436149 Edabel
- 34651 Edamadaka
- 13448 Edbryce
- 413 Edburga
- 673 Edda
- 16048 Eddiedai
- 33012 Eddieirizarry
- 24005 Eddieozawa
- 2761 Eddington
- 9205 Eddywally
- 2541 Edebono
- 22251 Eden
- 14739 Edgarchavez
- 39882 Edgarmitchell
- 11726 Edgerton
- 3487 Edgeworth
- 132903 Edgibson
- 7692 Edhenderson
- 8283 Edinburgh
- 742 Edisona
- 517 Edith
- 5967 Edithlevy
- 7265 Edithmüller
- 6029 Edithrand
- 28791 Edithsykeslowell
- 22723 Edlopez
- 17032 Edlu
- 1341 Edmée
- 12533 Edmond
- 1761 Edmondson
- 96193 Edmonton
- 445 Edna
- 9782 Edo
- 27917 Edoardo
- 187805 Edoardoedo
- 15007 Edoardopozio
- 4966 Edolsen
- 280641 Edosara
- 8494 Edpatvega
- 33486 Edreynolds
- 13077 Edschneider
- 4854 Edscott
- 3932 Edshay
- 7551 Edstolper
- 340 Eduarda
- 26532 Eduardoboff
- 273412 Eduardomissoni
- 159776 Eduardoröhl
- 33054 Eduardorossi
- 20292 Eduardreznik
- 2440 Educatio
- 239890 Edudeldon
- 33383 Edupuganti
- 31651 Edurnepasaban
- 9055 Edvardsson
- 357546 Edwardhalbach
- 134292 Edwardhall
- 33589 Edwardkim
- 129335 Edwardlittle
- 9260 Edwardolson
- 21367 Edwardpleva
- 16019 Edwardsu
- 241527 Edwardwright
- 249542 Edwardyoung
- 6282 Edwelda
- 1046 Edwin
- 34620 Edwinbodoni
- 26485 Edwinpost
- 15077 Edyalge
- 168039 Eefalcoacosta
- 29638 Eeshakhare
- 6002 Eetion
- 585349 Eeuwes
- 294296 Efeso
- 8789 Effertz
- 2754 Efimov
- 2269 Efremiana
- 16516 Efremlevitan
- 12975 Efremov
- 679552 Efspringer
- 84015 Efthymiopoulos
- 99581 Egal
- 19288 Egami
- 301061 Egelsbach
- 3103 Eger
- 13 Egeria
- 151659 Egerszegi
- 31661 Eggebraaten
- 236807 Eggen
- 28751 Eggl
- 22401 Egisto
- 8632 Egleston
- 320153 Eglītis
- 8450 Egorov
- 281247 Egryjózsef
- 15231 Ehdita
- 48736 Ehime
- 39712 Ehimedaigaku
- 2113 Ehrdni
- 58579 Ehrenberg
- 32796 Ehrenfest
- 9826 Ehrenfreund
- 65708 Ehrlich
- 2274 Ehrsson
- 9413 Eichendorff
- 3617 Eicher
- 4297 Eichhorn
- 26495 Eichorn
- 442 Eichsfeldia
- 10094 Eijikato
- 9676 Eijkman
- 11836 Eileen
- 25695 Eileenjang
- 20339 Eileenreed
- 19084 Eilestam
- 24816 Einagahideo
- 11577 Einasto
- 11728 Einer
- 11148 Einhardress
- 12144 Einhart
- 2001 Einstein
- 15440 Eioneus
- 10774 Eisenach
- 20136 Eisenhart
- 20174 Eisenstein
- 5530 Eisinga
- 350178 Eisleben
- 28697 Eitanacks
- 7125 Eitarodate
- 189848 Eivissa
- 5813 Eizaburo
- 12869 Ejiaga
- 694 Ekard
- 6955 Ekaterina
- 27736 Ekaterinburg
- 20212 Ekbaltouma
- 18239 Ekers
- 12496 Ekholm
- 12497 Ekkehard
- 20371 Ekladyous
- 9265 Ekman
- 24713 Ekrutt
- 548624 Ekwerike
- 858 El Djezaïr
- 6224 El Goresy
- 2311 El Leoncito
- 7371 El-Baz
- 357148 El-Maarry
- 4116 Elachi
- 8886 Elaeagnus
- 31846 Elainegillum
- 19808 Elainemccall
- 6944 Elaineowens
- 20338 Elainepappas
- 27263 Elainezhou
- 13862 Elais
- 18943 Elaisponton
- 9810 Elanfiller
- 31824 Elatus
- 2567 Elba
- 160013 Elbrus
- 6828 Elbsteel
- 110295 Elcalafate
- 26238 Elduval
- 130 Elektra
- 346318 Elektrėnai
- 268686 Elenaaprile
- 33539 Elenaberman
- 278640 Elenačernienė
- 58580 Elenacuoghi
- 31103 Elenagarcía
- 315941 Elenagómez
- 52384 Elenapanko
- 98722 Elenaumberto
- 354 Eleonora
- 23355 Elephenor
- 567 Eleutheria
- 4974 Elford
- 618 Elfriede
- 33863 Elfriederwin
- 15674 Elfving
- 4818 Elgar
- 95824 Elger
- 75852 Elgie
- 1329 Eliane
- 26970 Eliáš
- 8804 Eliason
- 43956 Elidoro
- 24488 Eliebochner
- 232763 Eliewiesel
- 20441 Elijahmena
- 226861 Elimaor
- 9356 Elineke
- 2650 Elinor
- 17249 Eliotyoung
- 956 Elisa
- 412 Elisabetha
- 28769 Elisabethadams
- 25337 Elisabetta
- 85368 Elisabettacioni
- 35464 Elisaconsigli
- 25963 Elisalin
- 34453 Elisapeters
- 147766 Elisatoffoli
- 11122 Eliscolombini
- 20835 Eliseadcock
- 120112 Elizabethacton
- 4502 Elizabethann
- 15566 Elizabethbaker
- 50724 Elizabethbrown
- 28712 Elizabethcorn
- 39420 Elizabethgaskell
- 130283 Elizabethgraham
- 50719 Elizabethgriffin
- 101813 Elizabethmarston
- 25036 Elizabethof
- 34891 Elizabethpaige
- 27784 Elizabethpearce
- 15118 Elizabethsears
- 21440 Elizacollins
- 20283 Elizaheller
- 24432 Elizamcnitt
- 15543 Elizateel
- 191910 Elizawilliams
- 16962 Elizawoolard
- 20586 Elizkolod
- 25257 Elizmakarron
- 32013 Elkekersten
- 8252 Elkins-Tanton
- 80180 Elko
- 435 Ella
- 34235 Ellafeiner
- 19066 Ellarie
- 17235 Ellawesson
- 2735 Ellen
- 3775 Ellenbeth
- 19768 Ellendoane
- 91869 Ellenjozoff
- 18562 Ellenkey
- 20043 Ellenmacarthur
- 22871 Ellenoei
- 26686 Ellenprice
- 3711 Ellensburg
- 30225 Ellenzweibel
- 2196 Ellicott
- 17248 Ellieyang
- 3156 Ellington
- 3193 Elliot
- 861969 Elliottsmith
- 297005 Ellirichter
- 11980 Ellis
- 10177 Ellison
- 30285 Ellsworth-Bowers
- 616 Elly
- 5378 Ellyett
- 2493 Elmer
- 8377 Elmerreese
- 542857 Elmi
- 27539 Elmoutamid
- 5118 Elnapoul
- 10726 Elodie
- 156879 Eloïs
- 13652 Elowitz
- 20320 Eloypeña
- 59 Elpis
- 182 Elsa
- 14611 Elsaadawi
- 4385 Elsässer
- 30122 Elschweitzer
- 17771 Elsheimer
- 6309 Elsschot
- 3936 Elst
- 7968 Elst–Pizarro
- 2217 Eltigen
- 15752 Eluard
- 277 Elvira
- 246759 Elviracheca
- 17059 Elvis
- 1234 Elyna
- 22528 Elysehope
- 17795 Elysiasegal
- 24701 Elyu-Ene
- 23771 Emaitchar
- 114026 Emalanushenko
- 46252 Emamajerová
- 90447 Emans
- 576 Emanuela
- 9636 Emanuelaspessot
- 114608 Emanuelepace
- 101721 Emanuelfritsch
- 11145 Emanuelli
- 31584 Emaparker
- 4895 Embla
- 5087 Emelʹyanov
- 5617 Emelyanenko
- 8225 Emerson
- 33193 Emhyr
- 10174 Emička
- 6729 Emiko
- 82559 Emilbřezina
- 240381 Emilchyne
- 19400 Emileclaus
- 27947 Emilemathieu
- 15052 Emileschweitzer
- 22080 Emilevasseur
- 8096 Émilezola
- 4912 Emilhaury
- 85564 Emilia
- 50537 Emilianobiscardi
- 49469 Emilianomazzoni
- 35465 Emilianoricci
- 27511 Emiliedunham
- 96591 Emiliemartin
- 385980 Emiliosegrè
- 14627 Emilkowalski
- 20322 Emilwilawer
- 33399 Emilyann
- 12669 Emilybrisnehan
- 39428 Emilybrontë
- 27102 Emilychen
- 18204 Emilycostello
- 188800 Emilyfurfaro
- 28075 Emilyhoffman
- 41988 Emilyjoseph
- 16227 Emilykang
- 333591 Emilykeates
- 18086 Emilykraft
- 10282 Emilykramer
- 274860 Emilylakdawalla
- 30050 Emilypang
- 33801 Emilyshi
- 30328 Emilyspencer
- 19463 Emilystoll
- 17099 Emilytianshi
- 7372 Emimar
- 9495 Eminescu
- 481 Emita
- 283 Emma
- 144386 Emmabirath
- 14796 Emmabullock
- 22982 Emmacall
- 39539 Emmadesmet
- 31494 Emmafreedman
- 229900 Emmagreaves
- 11178 Emmajoy
- 34740 Emmakeeler
- 16237 Emmakratcha
- 32104 Emmarainey
- 65698 Emmarochelle
- 34200 Emmasun
- 341590 Emmawatson
- 15513 Emmermann
- 5391 Emmons
- 5001 EMP
- 6152 Empedocles
- 157473 Emuno
- 26223 Enari
- 9134 Encke
- 5443 Encrenaz
- 4282 Endate
- 470423 Endeavour
- 9197 Endo
- 7361 Endres
- 342 Endymion
- 5711 Eneev
- 9493 Enescu
- 4217 Engelhardt
- 29829 Engels
- 7548 Engström
- 6725 Engyoji
- 229777 ENIAC
- 13436 Enid
- 4404 Enirac
- 42168 Enispe
- 227767 Enkibilal
- 192182 Ennedi
- 154587 Ennico
- 4709 Ennomos
- 81948 Eno
- 263613 Enol
- 27349 Enos
- 52457 Enquist
- 31153 Enricaparri
- 25216 Enricobernardi
- 37573 Enricocaruso
- 210032 Enricocastellani
- 65848 Enricomari
- 48720 Enricomentana
- 33010 Enricoprosperi
- 20197 Enriques
- 9070 Ensab
- 26604 Ensign
- 548032 Ensisheim
- 2819 Ensor
- 9777 Enterprise
- 4272 Entsuji
- 21522 Entwisle
- 24641 Enver
- 6433 Enya
- 52480 Enzomora
- 221 Eos
- 12301 Eötvös
- 5259 Epeigeus
- 2148 Epeios
- 129342 Ependes
- 5350 Epetersen
- 23549 Epicles
- 32399 Epifani
- 5954 Epikouros
- 1810 Epimetheus
- 23382 Epistrophos
- 198993 Époigny
- 3838 Epona
- 8586 Epops
- 21484 Eppard
- 2928 Epstein
- 802 Epyaxa
- 32436 Eranofek
- 128054 Eranyavneh
- 20326 Erard
- 7907 Erasmus
- 62 Erato
- 3251 Eratosthenes
- 5621 Erb
- 320065 Erbaghjolu
- 40106 Erben
- 3674 Erbisbühl
- 3114 Ercilla
- 155784 Ercol
- 7961 Ercolepoli
- 894 Erda
- 241363 Érdibálint
- 55759 Erdmannsdorff
- 405571 Erdőspál
- 17369 Eremeeva
- 5019 Erfjord
- 1254 Erfordia
- 282669 Erguël
- 1402 Eri
- 4954 Eric
- 26636 Ericabroman
- 26672 Ericabrooke
- 18790 Ericaburden
- 33456 Ericacurran
- 13272 Ericadavid
- 95024 Ericaellingson
- 28886 Ericajawin
- 40956 Ericamsel
- 23110 Ericberne
- 25901 Ericbrooks
- 30199 Ericbrown
- 128327 Ericcarranza
- 13858 Ericchristensen
- 34791 Ericcraine
- 28662 Ericduran
- 28952 Ericepstein
- 45338 Ericevans
- 28309 Ericfein
- 30368 Ericferrante
- 10841 Ericforbes
- 25678 Ericfoss
- 319227 Erichbär
- 30073 Erichen
- 542568 Erichess
- 7940 Erichmeyer
- 9430 Erichthonios
- 9620 Ericidle
- 26654 Ericjohnson
- 14544 Ericjones
- 25264 Erickeen
- 36352 Erickmeza
- 25430 Ericlarson
- 28449 Ericlau
- 298232 Ericlimburg
- 15929 Ericlinton
- 209209 Ericmarsh
- 172985 Ericmelin
- 299755 Ericmontellese
- 129119 Ericmuhle
- 121103 Ericneilsen
- 24412 Ericpalmer
- 17807 Ericpearce
- 129160 Ericpeters
- 454329 Ericpiquette
- 235145 Ericquirico
- 249530 Ericrice
- 19813 Ericsands
- 25479 Ericshyu
- 5705 Ericsterken
- 20491 Ericstrege
- 9988 Erictemplebell
- 28398 Ericthomas
- 333242 Ericthomasparker
- 718 Erida
- 3512 Eriepa
- 163 Erigone
- 636 Erika
- 31175 Erikafuchs
- 20367 Erikagibb
- 33897 Erikagreen
- 35435 Erikayang
- 33044 Erikdavy
- 15170 Erikdeul
- 23801 Erikgustafson
- 4044 Erikhøg
- 15621 Erikhovland
- 11307 Erikolsson
- 11521 Erikson
- 24066 Eriksorensen
- 129955 Eriksyrstad
- 5331 Erimomisaki
- 2167 Erin
- 28655 Erincolfax
- 22705 Erinedwards
- 19003 Erinfrey
- 25378 Erinlambert
- 10063 Erinleeryan
- 133834 Erinmorton
- 12092 Erinorourke
- 12548 Erinriley
- 27570 Erinschumacher
- 34190 Erinsmith
- 18662 Erinwhite
- 11397 Eriopis
- 462 Eriphyla
- 136199 Eris
- 197870 Erkman
- 4681 Ermak
- 10680 Ermakov
- 21696 Ermalmquist
- 13850 Erman
- 705 Erminia
- 3657 Ermolova
- 406 Erna
- 12878 Erneschiller
- 698 Ernestina
- 7349 Ernestmaes
- 39699 Ernestocorte
- 95951 Ernestopalomba
- 21581 Ernestoruiz
- 11008 Ernst
- 330856 Ernsthelene
- 15265 Ernsting
- 811540 Ernstsalpeter
- 11042 Ernstweber
- 30536 Erondón
- 433 Eros
- 199687 Erősszsolt
- 311785 Erwanmazarico
- 15263 Erwingroten
- 185638 Erwinschwab
- 9542 Eryan
- 889 Erynia
- 8020 Erzgebirge
- 9950 ESA
- 6920 Esaki
- 4195 Esambaev
- 9368 Esashi
- 5095 Escalante
- 9909 Eschenbach
- 96206 Eschenberg
- 4444 Escher
- 32487 Eschrig
- 1509 Esclangona
- 30036 Eshamaiti
- 20809 Eshinjolly
- 10481 Esipov
- 30275 Eskow
- 16247 Esner
- 810657 ESOC
- 14120 Espenak
- 1421 Esperanto
- 34042 Espeseth
- 2253 Espinette
- 333003 Espiritu
- 284029 Esplugafrancolí
- 335500 Espresso
- 14026 Esquerdo
- 7363 Esquibel
- 133243 Essen
- 16578 Essjayess
- 16641 Esteban
- 35646 Estela
- 14681 Estellechurch
- 16998 Estelleweber
- 4638 Estens
- 11517 Esteracuna
- 22744 Esterantonucci
- 11694 Esterhuysen
- 622 Esther
- 30402 Esthergoddard
- 1541 Estonia
- 12876 Estrada
- 15503 Estradioto
- 11697 Estrella
- 5416 Estremadoyro
- 10374 Etampes
- 27074 Etatolia
- 12916 Eteoneus
- 30473 Ethanbutson
- 32630 Ethanlevy
- 27619 Ethanmessier
- 32057 Ethannovek
- 19640 Ethanroth
- 2032 Ethel
- 331 Etheridgea
- 1432 Ethiopia
- 35655 Étienneklein
- 3456 Etiennemarey
- 11249 Etna
- 7647 Etrépigny
- 174801 Etscorn
- 8691 Etsuko
- 20804 Etter
- 127965 Ettorecittadini
- 29428 Ettoremajorana
- 34993 Euaimon
- 6696 Eubanks
- 1119 Euboea
- 181 Eucharis
- 99950 Euchenor
- 4354 Euclides
- 9019 Eucommia
- 9020 Eucryphia
- 217 Eudora
- 228110 Eudorus
- 11709 Eudoxos
- 4063 Euforbo
- 207319 Eugenemar
- 34524 Eugenerivera
- 558195 Eugengindl
- 45 Eugenia
- 249540 Eugeniescott
- 18861 Eugenishmidt
- 743 Eugenisis
- 19499 Eugenybiryukov
- 5664 Eugster
- 247 Eukrate
- 495 Eulalia
- 55749 Eulenspiegel
- 2002 Euler
- 12972 Eumaios
- 5436 Eumelos
- 23668 Eunbekim
- 7152 Euneus
- 331298 Eunicefoote
- 31903 Euniceyou
- 185 Eunike
- 15 Eunomia
- 630 Euphemia
- 382238 Euphemus
- 13963 Euphrates
- 31 Euphrosyne
- 3655 Eupraksia
- 5261 Eureka
- 2930 Euripides
- 52 Europa
- 8968 Europaeus
- 4007 Euryalos
- 527 Euryanthe
- 3548 Eurybates
- 29314 Eurydamas
- 75 Eurydike
- 195 Eurykleia
- 9818 Eurymachos
- 5012 Eurymedon
- 79 Eurynome
- 280924 Eurypterus
- 4501 Eurypylos
- 8317 Eurysaces
- 463368 Eurytus
- 27 Euterpe
- 164 Eva
- 29456 Evakrchová
- 346999 Evalilly
- 171465 Evamaria
- 26340 Evamarková
- 17697 Evanchen
- 26682 Evanfletcher
- 20873 Evanfrank
- 31884 Evangelista
- 24369 Evanichols
- 29663 Evanmackay
- 25722 Evanmarshall
- 34800 Evanmeade
- 366252 Evanmillsap
- 24140 Evanmirts
- 21568 Evanmorikawa
- 28168 Evanolin
- 3032 Evans
- 34892 Evapalisa
- 39892 Evaseidlová
- 2130 Evdokiya
- 503 Evelyn
- 2656 Evenkia
- 33002 Everest
- 14593 Everett
- 34766 Everettkroll
- 2664 Everhart
- 14439 Evermeersch
- 260676 Évethurière
- 12979 Evgalvasilʹev
- 7628 Evgenifedorov
- 24609 Evgenij
- 5675 Evgenilebedev
- 384282 Evgeniyegorov
- 17173 Evgenyamosov
- 29806 Eviesobczak
- 1569 Evita
- 270725 Evka
- 24648 Evpatoria
- 4234 Evtushenko
- 50412 Ewen
- 12843 Ewers
- 9499 Excalibur
- 8591 Excubitor
- 183288 Eyer
- 20252 Eyjafjallajökull
- 28396 Eymann
- 9756 Ezaki
- 48640 Eziobosso
- 24245 Ezratty
back to top

== See also ==
- List of minor planet discoverers
- List of observatory codes
- Meanings of minor planet names § Index
