= Chrysothemis (disambiguation) =

Chrysothemis is a name ascribed to several characters in Greek mythology.

Chrysothemis may also refer to:

- Chrysothemis (plant), a genus of plants in the family Gesneriaceae
- 637 Chrysothemis, a minor planet
- Chrysothemis, a descendant of Perseus
