= Newtonia =

Newtonia could refer to:

- Newtonia, Cheshire, England
- Newtonia, Missouri, a town in Missouri, USA
- Newtonia (bird), a genus of vangas, passerine birds endemic to Madagascar
- Newtonia (plant), a genus of flowering plants in the family Fabaceae
- 662 Newtonia, a minor planet
