= 603 (disambiguation) =

603 may refer to:

- 603 (number), the natural number following 602 and preceding 604
- 603 CE
- 603 BC
- Area code 603
- IBM 603 Electronic Multiplier, the first mass-produced commercial electronic calculating device
- PowerPC 603, a processor a part of the PowerPC 600 family
- Socket 603, a motherboard socket for Intel Xeon processors
- 603 Timandra, a minor planet
- Tatra 603, a family car
- Bristol 603, a 2-door saloon
