= 600 Musa =

Minor planet

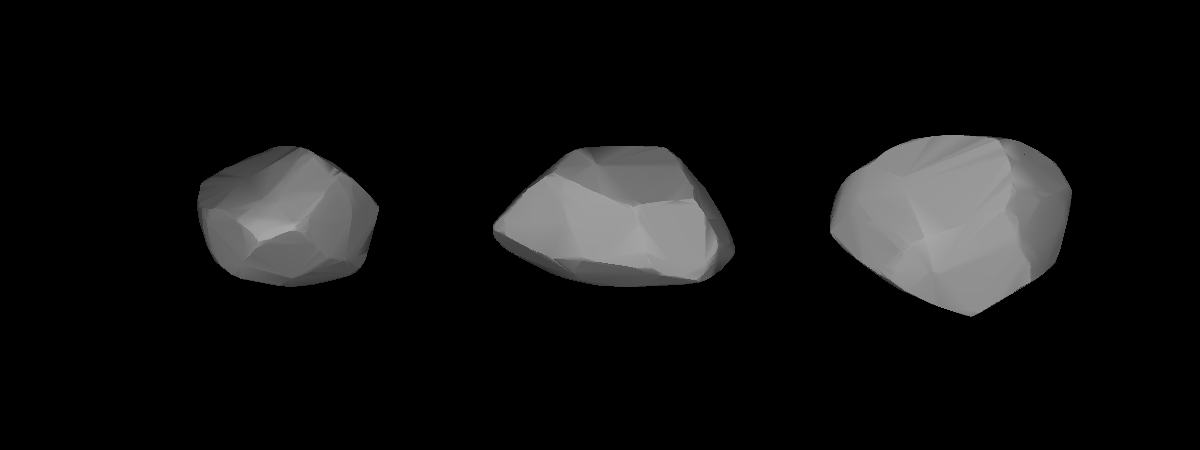
- A three-dimensional model of 600 Musa based on its light curve

Discovery
- Discovered by: Joel Hastings Metcalf
- Discovery site: Taunton, Massachusetts
- Discovery date: 14 June 1906

Designations
- Pronunciation: /ˈmjuːsə/
- Alternative designations: 1906 UM

Orbital characteristics
- Epoch 31 July 2016 (JD 2457600.5)
- Uncertainty parameter 0
- Observation arc: 109.59 yr (40029 d)
- Aphelion: 2.8080 AU (420.07 Gm)
- Perihelion: 2.5114 AU (375.70 Gm)
- Semi-major axis: 2.6597 AU (397.89 Gm)
- Eccentricity: 0.055753
- Orbital period (sidereal): 4.34 yr (1584.4 d)
- Mean anomaly: 147.603°
- Mean motion: 0° 13^{m} 37.992^{s} / day
- Inclination: 10.199°
- Longitude of ascending node: 139.298°
- Argument of perihelion: 114.513°

Physical characteristics
- Mean radius: 12.45±0.55 km
- Synodic rotation period: 5.8856 h (0.24523 d)
- Geometric albedo: 0.2415±0.022
- Absolute magnitude (H): 10.18

600 Musa is a minor planet orbiting the Sun.
