= 757 Portlandia =

Main-belt asteroid

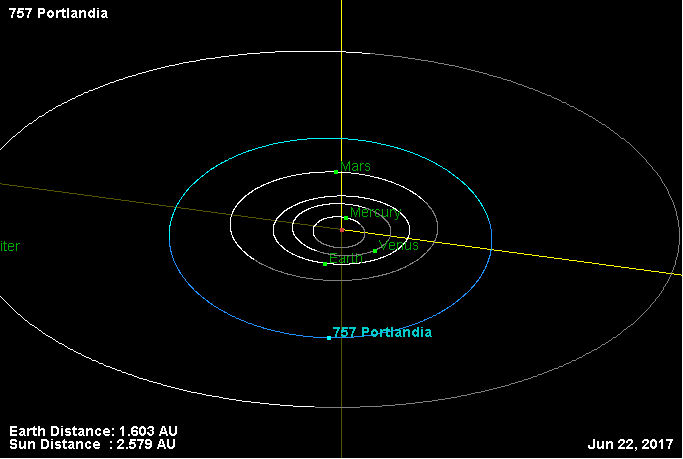
- Orbit of 757 Portlandia

Discovery
- Discovered by: Joel Hastings Metcalf
- Discovery site: Taunton, Massachusetts
- Discovery date: 30 September 1908

Designations
- Alternative designations: 1908 EJ

Orbital characteristics
- Epoch 31 July 2016 (JD 2457600.5)
- Uncertainty parameter 0
- Observation arc: 99.16 yr (36218 d)
- Aphelion: 2.6327 AU (393.85 Gm)
- Perihelion: 2.1142 AU (316.28 Gm)
- Semi-major axis: 2.3734 AU (355.06 Gm)
- Eccentricity: 0.10922
- Orbital period (sidereal): 3.66 yr (1335.6 d)
- Mean anomaly: 133.453°
- Mean motion: 0° 16^{m} 10.38^{s} / day
- Inclination: 8.1694°
- Longitude of ascending node: 22.515°
- Argument of perihelion: 44.204°

Physical characteristics
- Mean radius: 16.045±0.7 km
- Synodic rotation period: 6.5837 h (0.27432 d)
- Geometric albedo: 0.1427±0.014
- Spectral type: M
- Apparent magnitude: 12.3 to 15.7
- Absolute magnitude (H): 10.20

757 Portlandia is a main-belt asteroid 32 km in diameter. It was discovered on 30 September 1908 from Taunton, Massachusetts by the amateur American astronomer Joel E. Metcalf. The asteroid was named for the city of Portland, Maine, where Hastings was a church minister at the time. In November 2015, amateur astronomers captured it with images of comet 67P/Churyumov–Gerasimenko. Portlandia came to opposition in March 2016 at apparent magnitude 13.2.

== Physical characteristics ==
=== Classification ===
757 Portlandia was initially classified as an X-type asteroid by David J. Tholen in 1989, but in 2022 Irina Belskaya proposed that it may be F-type due to its low inversion angle. It is a core member of the proposed Athor asteroid family, named after 161 Athor.

=== Orbit and rotation ===
This body is orbiting the Sun at a distance of 2.37 AU with a period of 3.66 years and an eccentricity of 0.109. The orbital plane is inclined at an angle of 8.17° to the plane of the ecliptic. It rotates with a period of 6.58 hours.

=== Diameter and albedo ===
During 2003, the asteroid was observed occulting a star. The resulting chords were used to determine a diameter estimate of 36.7 km. In 2018, Josef Hanuš used thermophysical modeling to determine its diameter as 32.95±0.5 km. In 2020, a study from MNRAS used occultation values to determine the asteroid's diameter as 36.0±5 km.
