= 739 Mandeville =

Main-belt asteroid

Discovery
- Discovered by: Joel Hastings Metcalf
- Discovery site: Winchester, Massachusetts
- Discovery date: 7 February 1913

Designations
- Pronunciation: /ˈmændəvɪl/
- Alternative designations: 1913 QR
- Adjectives: Mandevillean /mændəˈvɪliən/

Orbital characteristics
- Epoch 31 July 2016 (JD 2457600.5)
- Uncertainty parameter 0
- Observation arc: 97.78 yr (35714 d)
- Aphelion: 3.1299 AU (468.23 Gm)
- Perihelion: 2.3445 AU (350.73 Gm)
- Semi-major axis: 2.7372 AU (409.48 Gm)
- Eccentricity: 0.14347
- Orbital period (sidereal): 4.53 yr (1654.0 d)
- Mean anomaly: 276.654°
- Mean motion: 0° 13^{m} 3.54^{s} / day
- Inclination: 20.660°
- Longitude of ascending node: 136.609°
- Argument of perihelion: 45.543°

Physical characteristics
- Mean radius: 53.765±1.25 km 52.765 ± 0.84 km (composite estimate)
- Mass: (1.02±0.36)×10^{18} kg (Note: Calculated from its standard gravitational parameter GM = 0.068±0.024 km^{3}/s^{2}.)
- Mean density: 1.70 g/cm^{3} (Note: Assuming a diameter of 105 km.)
- Synodic rotation period: 11.931 h (0.4971 d)
- Geometric albedo: 0.0608±0.003
- Absolute magnitude (H): 8.50

739 Mandeville is a minor planet located in the asteroid belt. Its absolute magnitude is 8.50. It was discovered on 7 February 1913 by Joel Hastings Metcalf in Winchester, Massachusetts, and assigned the provisional code 1913 QR. A later, duplicate discovery was assigned the code 1963 HE.

The orbital characteristics are calculated from the epoch of 4 January 2010, at which time 739 Mandeville had an orbital period of 1656 days and an orbital axis of 2.74 AU with eccentricity 0.14. Thus, its minimum distance from the sun was 2.35 and its maximum was 3.13. Its orbital inclination was found to be 20.71°, and its mean anomaly 116.58°.

== See also ==
- List of minor planets/701–800
- Meanings of minor planet names: 501–1000
