= 653 Berenike =

Main-Belt asteroid

Discovery
- Discovered by: Joel Hastings Metcalf
- Discovery site: Taunton, Massachusetts
- Discovery date: 27 November 1907

Designations
- Pronunciation: /bɛrɪˈnaɪkiː/
- Named after: Berenice II
- Alternative designations: 1907 BK
- Minor planet category: Main belt

Orbital characteristics
- Epoch 31 July 2016 (JD 2457600.5)
- Uncertainty parameter 0
- Observation arc: 108.38 yr (39584 d)
- Aphelion: 3.1360 AU (469.14 Gm)
- Perihelion: 2.8961 AU (433.25 Gm)
- Semi-major axis: 3.01609 AU (451.201 Gm)
- Eccentricity: 0.039773
- Orbital period (sidereal): 5.24 yr (1913.2 d)
- Mean anomaly: 156.090°
- Mean motion: 0° 11^{m} 17.376^{s} / day
- Inclination: 11.290°
- Longitude of ascending node: 132.867°
- Argument of perihelion: 55.838°

Physical characteristics
- Dimensions: 39.22 ± 2.4 km (24.37 ± 1.49 mi); Mean diameter
- Mean radius: 19.61±1.2 km
- Synodic rotation period: 12.4886±0.0007 h; 12.4886 h (0.52036 d)
- Geometric albedo: 0.2444±0.034
- Absolute magnitude (H): 9.18; 9.2

653 Berenike is a main-belt asteroid discovered on 27 November 1907 by Joel Hastings Metcalf at Taunton, Massachusetts. It is named after Berenice II of Egypt, after whom the constellation Coma Berenices is also named. The name may have been inspired by the asteroid's provisional designation 1907 BK.

Berenike is a member of the dynamic Eos family of asteroids that most likely formed as the result of a collisional breakup of a parent body.
