= 726 Joëlla =

Main-belt asteroid

Discovery
- Discovered by: Joel Hastings Metcalf
- Discovery site: Winchester, Massachusetts
- Discovery date: 22 November 1911

Designations
- Pronunciation: /dʒoʊˈɛlə/
- Alternative designations: 1911 NM

Orbital characteristics
- Epoch 31 July 2016 (JD 2457600.5)
- Uncertainty parameter 0
- Observation arc: 84.76 yr (30958 d)
- Aphelion: 3.2978 AU (493.34 Gm)
- Perihelion: 1.8387 AU (275.07 Gm)
- Semi-major axis: 2.5683 AU (384.21 Gm)
- Eccentricity: 0.28407
- Orbital period (sidereal): 4.12 yr (1503.4 d)
- Mean anomaly: 203.587°
- Mean motion: 0° 14^{m} 22.092^{s} / day
- Inclination: 15.414°
- Longitude of ascending node: 242.040°
- Argument of perihelion: 112.979°

Physical characteristics
- Mean radius: 22.01±1.75 km
- Synodic rotation period: 13.04 h (0.543 d)
- Geometric albedo: 0.0539±0.010
- Absolute magnitude (H): 10.57

726 Joëlla is a minor planet orbiting the Sun. It was discovered on November 22, 1911, by Joel Hastings Metcalf, in Winchester, Massachusetts, in the United States.
