= 655 Briseïs =

Main-belt asteroid

Discovery
- Discovered by: Joel Hastings Metcalf
- Discovery site: Taunton, Massachusetts
- Discovery date: 4 November 1907

Designations
- Pronunciation: /braɪˈsiːɪs/
- Alternative designations: 1907 BF

Orbital characteristics
- Epoch 31 July 2016 (JD 2457600.5)
- Uncertainty parameter 0
- Observation arc: 108.19 yr (39515 d)
- Aphelion: 3.2489 AU (486.03 Gm)
- Perihelion: 2.7297 AU (408.36 Gm)
- Semi-major axis: 2.9893 AU (447.19 Gm)
- Eccentricity: 0.086836
- Orbital period (sidereal): 5.17 yr (1887.8 d)
- Mean anomaly: 8.32168°
- Mean motion: 0° 11^{m} 26.52^{s} / day
- Inclination: 6.4972°
- Longitude of ascending node: 130.064°
- Argument of perihelion: 278.531°

Physical characteristics
- Mean radius: 15.395±0.95 km
- Synodic rotation period: 160.66 h (6.694 d)
- Geometric albedo: 0.2693±0.036
- Absolute magnitude (H): 10.0

655 Briseïs is a minor planet orbiting the Sun.
