= 604 Tekmessa =

Main-belt asteroid

Discovery
- Discovered by: Joel Hastings Metcalf
- Discovery site: Taunton, Massachusetts
- Discovery date: 16 February 1906

Designations
- Pronunciation: /tɛkˈmɛsə/
- Alternative designations: 1906 TK

Orbital characteristics
- Epoch 31 July 2016 (JD 2457600.5)
- Uncertainty parameter 0
- Observation arc: 104.87 yr (38303 d)
- Aphelion: 3.7742 AU (564.61 Gm)
- Perihelion: 2.5217 AU (377.24 Gm)
- Semi-major axis: 3.1480 AU (470.93 Gm)
- Eccentricity: 0.19894
- Orbital period (sidereal): 5.59 yr (2040.1 d)
- Mean anomaly: 351.53°
- Mean motion: 0° 10^{m} 35.256^{s} / day
- Inclination: 4.4213°
- Longitude of ascending node: 12.171°
- Argument of perihelion: 28.815°

Physical characteristics
- Mean radius: 32.58±2.05 km 32.21 ± 1.505 km
- Mass: (1.45 ± 0.28) × 10^{18} kg
- Mean density: 10.35 ± 2.4 g/cm^{3}
- Synodic rotation period: 5.5596 h (0.23165 d)
- Geometric albedo: 0.0870±0.012
- Absolute magnitude (H): 9.29, 9.5

604 Tekmessa is a minor planet orbiting the Sun that was discovered by American astronomer Joel Hastings Metcalf on February 16, 1906. The name may have been inspired by the asteroid's provisional designation 1906 TK.
