= 660 Crescentia =

Asteroid

Discovery
- Discovered by: Joel Hastings Metcalf
- Discovery site: Taunton, Massachusetts
- Discovery date: 8 January 1908

Designations
- Pronunciation: /krəˈsɛnʃə/
- Alternative designations: 1908 CC

Orbital characteristics
- Epoch 31 July 2016 (JD 2457600.5)
- Uncertainty parameter 0
- Observation arc: 106.74 yr (38987 d)
- Aphelion: 2.8075 AU (420.00 Gm)
- Perihelion: 2.2581 AU (337.81 Gm)
- Semi-major axis: 2.5328 AU (378.90 Gm)
- Eccentricity: 0.10846
- Orbital period (sidereal): 4.03 yr (1472.3 d)
- Mean anomaly: 185.507°
- Mean motion: 0° 14^{m} 40.272^{s} / day
- Inclination: 15.205°
- Longitude of ascending node: 156.981°
- Argument of perihelion: 106.012°

Physical characteristics
- Mean radius: 21.12±0.5 km
- Synodic rotation period: 7.9116 h (0.32965 d)
- Geometric albedo: 0.2186±0.011
- Absolute magnitude (H): 9.14

660 Crescentia is a minor planet orbiting the Sun that was discovered by American astronomer Joel Hastings Metcalf on 8 January 1908. The name may have been inspired by the asteroid's provisional designation 1908 CC. Peter Ting points out that the Rev. Joel Metcalf of Taunton (Massachusetts) discovered six asteroids with unexplained names, though listed in Lutz Schmadel's book. Ting used an on-line planetarium website to help with the location of some of the planets, playing back to the night of discovery. He noticed that there was a crescent moon (33%) low in the western sky and wonders if the Rev. Metcalf could have named the asteroid for the Moon. Crescentia would be a very unusual name for a person but not for a phase of the Moon.

Crescentia is a member of the dynamic Maria family of asteroids that most likely formed as the result of a collisional breakup of a parent body.
