= 740 Cantabia =

Main-belt asteroid

Discovery
- Discovered by: Joel Hastings Metcalf
- Discovery site: Winchester, Massachusetts
- Discovery date: 10 February 1913

Designations
- Pronunciation: /kænˈteɪbiə/
- Alternative designations: 1913 QS

Orbital characteristics
- Epoch 31 July 2016 (JD 2457600.5)
- Uncertainty parameter 0
- Observation arc: 103.10 yr (37,659 d)
- Aphelion: 3.3892 AU (507.02 Gm)
- Perihelion: 2.7145 AU (406.08 Gm)
- Semi-major axis: 3.0519 AU (456.56 Gm)
- Eccentricity: 0.11053
- Orbital period (sidereal): 5.33 yr (1,947.4 d)
- Mean anomaly: 133.938°
- Mean motion: 0° 11^{m} 5.532^{s} / day
- Inclination: 10.846°
- Longitude of ascending node: 116.099°
- Argument of perihelion: 47.844°

Physical characteristics
- Mean radius: 45.45±0.85 km
- Mass: (1.03±0.45)×10^{18} kg (Note: Calculated from its standard gravitational parameter GM = 0.069±0.030 km^{3}/s^{2}.)
- Mean density: 2.61 g/cm^{3} (Note: Assuming a diameter of 90.9 km.)
- Synodic rotation period: 64.453 h (2.6855 d)
- Geometric albedo: 0.0552±0.002
- Absolute magnitude (H): 9.1

740 Cantabia is a minor planet orbiting the Sun. It was discovered on 10 February 1913 at Winchester, Massachusetts by American amateur astronomer J. H. Metcalf. Cantabia is a contraction of Cantabrigia, Latin for Cambridge, named in honor of Cambridge, Massachusetts. It is orbiting at a distance of 3.05 AU with a period of 5.33 years and an eccentricity (ovalness) of 0.11. Between 2014 and 2021, 740 Cantabia has been observed to occult three stars.

This asteroid shows an exceptionally slow rate of spin. Photometry observations from two independent teams during 2009 were combined to generate a light curve showing a rotation period of 64.453 hours (2.69 days) with a brightness variation of 0.16±0.03 in magnitude. The spectrum is classified as type CX in the Tholen taxonomy. It spans a girth estimated at ~91 km.

== See also ==
- List of minor planets/701–800
- Meanings of minor planet names: 501–1000
