= 620 Drakonia =

Asteroid

Discovery
- Discovered by: Joel Hastings Metcalf
- Discovery site: Taunton, Massachusetts
- Discovery date: 26 October 1906

Designations
- Alternative designations: 1906 WE

Orbital characteristics
- Epoch 31 July 2016 (JD 2457600.5)
- Uncertainty parameter 0
- Observation arc: 85.05 yr (31065 d)
- Aphelion: 2.7650 AU (413.64 Gm)
- Perihelion: 2.1063 AU (315.10 Gm)
- Semi-major axis: 2.4356 AU (364.36 Gm)
- Eccentricity: 0.13523
- Orbital period (sidereal): 3.80 yr (1388.4 d)
- Mean anomaly: 8.1809°
- Mean motion: 0° 15^{m} 33.444^{s} / day
- Inclination: 7.7394°
- Longitude of ascending node: 0.017298°
- Argument of perihelion: 336.486°

Physical characteristics
- Synodic rotation period: 5.49 h 5.487 h (0.2286 d)
- Absolute magnitude (H): 11.28

620 Drakonia is a minor planet, specifically an asteroid orbiting in the asteroid belt. It was discovered October 26, 1906, in Taunton, Massachusetts, by American astronomer Joel Hastings Metcalf and given the preliminary designation 1906 WE. It may have been named for Drake University.

Photometric observations at the Palmer Divide Observatory in Colorado Springs, Colorado, in 2001 were used to build a light curve for this object. The asteroid displayed a rotation period of 5.49 ± 0.01 hours and a brightness variation of 0.56 ± 0.02 in magnitude.
