= 661 Cloelia =

Main-belt asteroid

Discovery
- Discovered by: Joel Hastings Metcalf
- Discovery site: Taunton, Massachusetts
- Discovery date: 22 February 1908

Designations
- Pronunciation: /ˈkliːliə/
- Alternative designations: 1908 CL

Orbital characteristics
- Epoch 31 July 2016 (JD 2457600.5)
- Uncertainty parameter 0
- Observation arc: 97.95 yr (35777 d)
- Aphelion: 3.1190 AU (466.60 Gm)
- Perihelion: 2.9143 AU (435.97 Gm)
- Semi-major axis: 3.0166 AU (451.28 Gm)
- Eccentricity: 0.033930
- Orbital period (sidereal): 5.24 yr (1913.7 d)
- Mean anomaly: 248.593°
- Mean motion: 0° 11^{m} 17.232^{s} / day
- Inclination: 9.2315°
- Longitude of ascending node: 335.823°
- Argument of perihelion: 181.133°

Physical characteristics
- Mean radius: 24.025±0.75 km
- Synodic rotation period: 5.536 h (0.2307 d)
- Geometric albedo: 0.1076±0.007
- Absolute magnitude (H): 9.6

661 Cloelia is a minor planet orbiting the Sun that was discovered by American astronomer Joel Hastings Metcalf on 22 February 1908.

Cloelia is a member of the dynamic Eos family of asteroids that most likely formed as the result of a collisional breakup of a parent body.

The planet is named after the Ancient Roman woman Cloelia. The name may have been inspired by the asteroid's provisional designation 1908 CL.
