= 737 Arequipa =

Main-belt asteroid

Discovery
- Discovered by: Joel Hastings Metcalf
- Discovery site: Winchester, Massachusetts
- Discovery date: 7 December 1912

Designations
- Alternative designations: 1912 QB

Orbital characteristics
- Epoch 31 July 2016 (JD 2457600.5)
- Uncertainty parameter 0
- Observation arc: 100.96 yr (36874 d)
- Aphelion: 3.2248 AU (482.42 Gm)
- Perihelion: 1.9562 AU (292.64 Gm)
- Semi-major axis: 2.5905 AU (387.53 Gm)
- Eccentricity: 0.24485
- Orbital period (sidereal): 4.17 yr (1,522.9 d)
- Mean anomaly: 24.8306°
- Mean motion: 0° 14^{m} 11.004^{s} / day
- Inclination: 12.368°
- Longitude of ascending node: 184.672°
- Argument of perihelion: 134.348°

Physical characteristics
- Mean radius: 22.035±0.7 km
- Synodic rotation period: 7.0259 h (0.29275 d)
- Geometric albedo: 0.2723±0.018
- Spectral type: S
- Absolute magnitude (H): 8.81

737 Arequipa is a minor planet orbiting the Sun. It was discovered by American astronomer Joel Hastings Metcalf on 7 December 1912 from Winchester, Massachusetts. This stony S-type asteroid was named after the Peruvian city of Arequipa, where Harvard's Boyden Observatory was located prior to 1927. It is orbiting at a distance of 2.59 AU from the Sun, with an orbital eccentricity (ovalness) of 0.245 and a period of 4.17 yr. The orbital plane is inclined at an angle of 12.4° to the ecliptic.

The rotation period of this asteroid has proven to be a challenge to determine, most likely because it has a complex shape and a rotation axis with a low inclination. However, during the 2015 apparition, photometric measurements of the asteroid were taken from close to the equatorial perspective. The resulting light curve displayed a rotation period of 7.0259±0.0003 h.

== See also ==
- List of minor planets/701–800
- Meanings of minor planet names: 501–1000
