= 638 Moira =

Main-belt asteroid

Discovery
- Discovered by: Joel Hastings Metcalf
- Discovery site: Taunton, Massachusetts
- Discovery date: 5 May 1907

Designations
- Pronunciation: /ˈmɔɪrə/
- Named after: Moirae
- Alternative designations: 1907 ZQ

Orbital characteristics
- Epoch 31 July 2016 (JD 2457600.5)
- Uncertainty parameter 0
- Observation arc: 110.22 yr (40257 d)
- Aphelion: 3.1701 AU (474.24 Gm)
- Perihelion: 2.3005 AU (344.15 Gm)
- Semi-major axis: 2.7353 AU (409.20 Gm)
- Eccentricity: 0.15896
- Orbital period (sidereal): 4.52 yr (1652.4 d)
- Mean anomaly: 54.7967°
- Mean motion: 0° 13^{m} 4.332^{s} / day
- Inclination: 7.7123°
- Longitude of ascending node: 103.208°
- Argument of perihelion: 128.586°

Physical characteristics
- Mean radius: 32.72±0.7 km
- Synodic rotation period: 9.875 h (0.4115 d)
- Geometric albedo: 0.060
- Absolute magnitude (H): 10.0

638 Moira, also known as A907 JG, is a minor planet orbiting the Sun. First observed in 1906, 638 Moira was discovered to be an orbital body in 1907 by Joel Hastings Metcalf in Taunton, England. 638 Moira is a little over 59.5 km across and rotates once every 10 hours. Its farthest point from the sun is a little over 3au during its 4.5 year orbit, and it is classed as an L-type asteroid (SMASSII).
