= 792 Metcalfia =

Main-belt asteroid

Discovery
- Discovered by: Joel Hastings Metcalf
- Discovery site: Taunton
- Discovery date: 20 March 1907

Designations
- Alternative designations: 1907 ZC

Orbital characteristics
- Epoch 31 July 2016 (JD 2457600.5)
- Uncertainty parameter 0
- Observation arc: 101.00 yr (36889 d)
- Aphelion: 2.9633 AU (443.30 Gm)
- Perihelion: 2.2819 AU (341.37 Gm)
- Semi-major axis: 2.6226 AU (392.34 Gm)
- Eccentricity: 0.12992
- Orbital period (sidereal): 4.25 yr (1551.3 d)
- Mean anomaly: 314.963°
- Mean motion: 0° 13^{m} 55.416^{s} / day
- Inclination: 8.6163°
- Longitude of ascending node: 265.120°
- Argument of perihelion: 227.772°
- Earth MOID: 1.30547 AU (195.296 Gm)
- Jupiter MOID: 2.15762 AU (322.775 Gm)
- T_{Jupiter}: 3.376

Physical characteristics
- Mean radius: 30.365±0.7 km
- Synodic rotation period: 9.17 h (0.382 d)
- Geometric albedo: 0.0354±0.002
- Apparent magnitude: 10.33
- Absolute magnitude (H): 10.33

792 Metcalfia is a minor planet orbiting the Sun. It was discovered in 1907 by Joel Hastings Metcalf and was named after its discoverer. This is an X-type asteroid in the main belt some 2.62 AU from the Sun. It has a rotation period of 9.17 hours and spans 61 km. The best fit meteorite analog is Gorlovka OC sample RS-CMP-048.

== See also ==
- List of minor planets: 1–1000
