= 645 Agrippina =

Main-belt asteroid

Discovery
- Discovered by: J. H. Metcalf
- Discovery site: Taunton, MA, United States
- Discovery date: 13 September 1907

Designations
- Pronunciation: /æɡrɪˈpaɪnə/
- Named after: Agrippīna (the Elder, the Younger)
- Alternative designations: 1907 AG
- Minor planet category: main-belt (outer)

Orbital characteristics
- Epoch 31 July 2016 (JD 2457600.5)
- Uncertainty parameter 0
- Observation arc: 108.28 yr (39551 d)
- Aphelion: 3.6806 AU (550.61 Gm)
- Perihelion: 2.7439 AU (410.48 Gm)
- Semi-major axis: 3.2123 AU (480.55 Gm)
- Eccentricity: 0.14581
- Orbital period (sidereal): 5.76 yr (2102.9 d)
- Mean anomaly: 322.43°
- Mean motion: 0° 10^{m} 16.284^{s} / day
- Inclination: 7.0434°
- Longitude of ascending node: 0.16657°
- Argument of perihelion: 84.246°
- Earth MOID: 1.76975 AU (264.751 Gm)
- Jupiter MOID: 1.61478 AU (241.568 Gm)
- T_{Jupiter}: 3.163

Physical characteristics
- Dimensions: 28.00±1.3 km (IRAS:17); 30.86±0.76 km 36.165±0.406 km 29.57±0.58 km 27.94 km (derived)
- Mean radius: 14.00±0.65 km
- Synodic rotation period: 32.6 h (1.36 d); 34.39±0.05 h
- Geometric albedo: 0.2381±0.025 (IRAS:17); 0.198±0.011; 0.1369±0.0218; 0.213±0.028; 0.2283 (SIMPS)
- Spectral type: B–V = 0.871; U–B = 0.412; Tholen = S · S
- Absolute magnitude (H): 9.94

645 Agrippina, provisional designation 1907 AG, is a stony asteroid from the outer region of the asteroid belt, roughly 30 kilometers in diameter. It was discovered by American astronomer reverend Joel Metcalf at Taunton, Massachusetts, USA, on 13 September 1907.

The S-type asteroid orbits the Sun at a distance of 2.7–3.7 AU once every 5 years and 9 months (2,103 days). Its orbit shows an eccentricity of 0.15 and is tilted by 7 degrees to the plane of the ecliptic. A photometric light-curve analysis from the 1980s and a provisional observation in 2004 rendered a rotation period of 32.6 and 34.4 hours, respectively.

According to the surveys carried out by the Infrared Astronomical Satellite, IRAS, the Japanese Akari satellite, and the U.S.Wide-field Infrared Survey Explorer with its subsequent NEOWISE mission, the asteroid has a dissimilar albedo in the range of 0.14 to 0.23, which leads to a varying estimate for its diameter from 28 to 36 kilometers. The Collaborative Asteroid Lightcurve Link publishes an albedo of 0.23 from an alternative result of the Supplemental IRAS Minor Planet Survey (SIMPS) and derives a slightly lower diameter of 27.9 kilometers.

The minor planet was named for two women of ancient Roman history. Agrippina the Elder (14 BCE – 33) was the daughter of the Roman statesman Marcus Vipsanius Agrippa, the wife of Germanicus and the mother of the Emperor Caligula. Her daughter, Agrippina the Younger (15–59 AD) was the mother of Emperor Nero. The naming might be influenced by the two letters of the provisional designation 1907 AG. In the Dictionary of Minor Planet Names, Lutz Schmadel supposes that the name originated from a list of female names from mythology and history, compiled by the Astronomisches Rechen-Institut (ARI) in 1913. The ARI then sent this list to a number of astronomers with the request to name their discoveries in order to avoid confusion, as the number of unnamed minor planet up to number 700 had grown significantly at the time.
