= Joel Hastings Metcalf =

American astronomer, humanitarian and minister

Joel Hastings Metcalf (January 4, 1866 – February 23, 1925) was an American astronomer, humanitarian and minister.

Reverend Metcalf graduated from Harvard Divinity School in 1892. He served as a Unitarian minister in Burlington, Vermont and in Taunton, Massachusetts, Winchester, Massachusetts and Portland, Maine.

He discovered or co-discovered several comets, including 23P/Brorsen-Metcalf and 97P/Metcalf-Brewington, and also 41 asteroids during 1905–1914, as credited by the Minor Planet Center.

Two of his discoveries, the main-belt asteroids 726 Joëlla and 792 Metcalfia, were named in his honor.

== Asteroids Discovered ==
Asteroids discovered: 41

525 Adelaide	October 21, 1908
581 Tauntonia	December 24, 1905
599 Luisa	April 25, 1906
600 Musa	June 14, 1906
602 Marianna	February 16, 1906
603 Timandra	February 16, 1906
604 Tekmessa	February 16, 1906
611 Valeria	September 24, 1906
620 Drakonia	October 26, 1906
622 Esther	November 13, 1906
636 Erika	February 8, 1907
637 Chrysothemis	March 11, 1907
638 Moira	May 5, 1907
645 Agrippina	September 13, 1907
653 Berenike	November 27, 1907
655 Briseïs	November 4, 1907
660 Crescentia	January 8, 1908
661 Cloelia	February 22, 1908
662 Newtonia	March 30, 1908
673 Edda	September 20, 1908
675 Ludmilla	August 30, 1908
690 Wratislavia	October 16, 1909
691 Lehigh	December 11, 1909
694 Ekard	November 7, 1909
695 Bella	November 7, 1909
696 Leonora	January 10, 1910
726 Joëlla	November 22, 1911
729 Watsonia	February 9, 1912
736 Harvard	November 16, 1912
737 Arequipa	December 7, 1912
739 Mandeville	February 7, 1913
740 Cantabia	February 10, 1913
741 Botolphia	February 10, 1913
747 Winchester	March 7, 1913
755 Quintilla	April 6, 1908
756 Lilliana	April 26, 1908
757 Portlandia	September 30, 1908
767 Bondia	September 23, 1913
784 Pickeringia	March 20, 1914
792 Metcalfia	March 20, 1907
1345 Potomac	February 4, 1908

== Bibliography ==
- Metcalf, Joel H. (1906). "An Amateur's Observatory". Popular Astronomy. 14: 211. Bibcode:1906PA.....14..211M.
- Metcalf, Joel H. (1906). "A New Method for the Discovery of Asteroids". The Astrophysical Journal. 23: 306. Bibcode:1906ApJ....23..306M. doi:10.1086/141344.
- Metcalf, Joel H. (1907). "A Photographic Method for the Detection of Variability in Asteroids". The Astrophysical Journal. 25: 264. Bibcode:1907ApJ....25..264M. doi:10.1086/141441.
- Metcalf, Joel H. (1912). "The Asteroid Problem". Popular Astronomy. 20: 201. Bibcode:1912PA.....20..201M.
