= 736 Harvard =

Main-belt asteroid

Discovery
- Discovered by: J. H. Metcalf
- Discovery site: Winchester Obs.
- Discovery date: 16 November 1912

Designations
- Named after: Harvard University (Cambridge, Massachusetts)
- Alternative designations: A912 WC · 1937 FC; 1947 HB · 1912 PZ
- Minor planet category: main-belt · (inner); background

Orbital characteristics
- Epoch 31 May 2020 (JD 2459000.5)
- Uncertainty parameter 0
- Observation arc: 106.85 yr (39,027 d)
- Aphelion: 2.5653 AU
- Perihelion: 1.8382 AU
- Semi-major axis: 2.2018 AU
- Eccentricity: 0.1651
- Orbital period (sidereal): 3.27 yr (1,193 d)
- Mean anomaly: 28.744°
- Mean motion: 0° 18^{m} 6.12^{s} / day
- Inclination: 4.3767°
- Longitude of ascending node: 135.91°
- Argument of perihelion: 200.51°

Physical characteristics
- Mean diameter: 16.66±0.6 km; 17.111±0.125 km; 17.92±0.27 km
- Synodic rotation period: 6.7 h
- Geometric albedo: 0.122±0.004; 0.133±0.022; 0.1406±0.011
- Spectral type: Tholen = S; B–V = 0.900±0.020; U–B = 0.510±0.020
- Absolute magnitude (H): 11.2; 11.64

736 Harvard (prov. designation: A912 WC or 1912 PZ) is a stony background asteroid from the inner regions of the asteroid belt, approximately 17 kilometers (11 miles) in diameter. It was discovered on 16 November 1912, by American astronomer Joel Hastings Metcalf at the Winchester Observatory (799). The bright S-type asteroid has a rotation period of 6.7 hours. It was named after Harvard University in Cambridge, Massachusetts.

== Orbit and classification ==
Located in the orbital region of the Flora family (402), Harvard is a non-family asteroid of the main belt's background population when applying the hierarchical clustering method to its proper orbital elements. It orbits the Sun in the inner asteroid belt at a distance of 1.8–2.6 AU once every 3 years and 3 months (1,193 days; semi-major axis of 2.2 AU). Its orbit has an eccentricity of 0.17 and an inclination of 4° with respect to the ecliptic. The body's observation arc begins at Heidelberg Observatory on 9 December 1912, or three weeks after its official discovery observation by Metcalf at Winchester.

== Naming ==
This minor planet was named in honor of the prestigious Harvard University in Cambridge, Massachusetts, United States. The naming was also mentioned in The Names of the Minor Planets by Paul Herget in 1955 (H 74).

== Physical characteristics ==
In the Tholen classification, Harvard is a common, stony S-type asteroid.

=== Rotation period ===
In 1970s, a rotational lightcurve of Harvard was obtained from photometric observations by Ed Tedesco. Lightcurve analysis gave a well-defined rotation period of 6.7 hours with a brightness variation of 0.32 magnitude (U=3).

=== Diameter and albedo ===
According to the surveys carried out by the Infrared Astronomical Satellite IRAS, the NEOWISE mission of NASA's Wide-field Infrared Survey Explorer (WISE), and the Japanese Akari satellite, Harvard measures (16.66±0.6), (17.111±0.125) and (17.92±0.27) kilometers in diameter and its surface has an albedo of (0.1406±0.011), (0.133±0.022) and (0.122±0.004), respectively. The Collaborative Asteroid Lightcurve Link derives an albedo of 0.2051 and a diameter of 16.89 kilometers based on an absolute magnitude of 11.2. An asteroid occultation observed on 25 May 2003, gave a best-fit ellipse dimension of (9.0 km × 9.0 km) with a low quality rating of 1. These timed observations are taken when the asteroid passes in front of a distant star.
