= 602 Marianna =

Main-belt asteroid

Discovery
- Discovered by: Joel Hastings Metcalf
- Discovery site: Taunton, Massachusetts
- Discovery date: 16 February 1906

Designations
- Alternative designations: 1906 TE

Orbital characteristics
- Epoch 31 July 2016 (JD 2457600.5)
- Uncertainty parameter 0
- Observation arc: 110.14 yr (40230 d)
- Aphelion: 3.8535 AU (576.48 Gm)
- Perihelion: 2.3147 AU (346.27 Gm)
- Semi-major axis: 3.0841 AU (461.37 Gm)
- Eccentricity: 0.24947
- Orbital period (sidereal): 5.42 yr (1978.3 d)
- Mean anomaly: 235.763°
- Mean motion: 0° 10^{m} 55.092^{s} / day
- Inclination: 15.107°
- Longitude of ascending node: 331.497°
- Argument of perihelion: 45.906°

Physical characteristics
- Mean diameter: 127.54±2.55 km (composite estimate); 110.444±1.517 km
- Mass: (1.15±0.46)×10^{18} kg (Note: Calculated from its standard gravitational parameter GM = 0.077±0.031 km^{3}/s^{2}.)
- Mean density: 1.65 g/cm^{3} (Note: Assuming a diameter of 110 km.)
- Synodic rotation period: 35.195 h (1.4665 d)
- Geometric albedo: 0.067±0.010
- Absolute magnitude (H): 8.65

602 Marianna is a minor planet orbiting the Sun.
