= 690 Wratislavia =

Main-belt asteroid

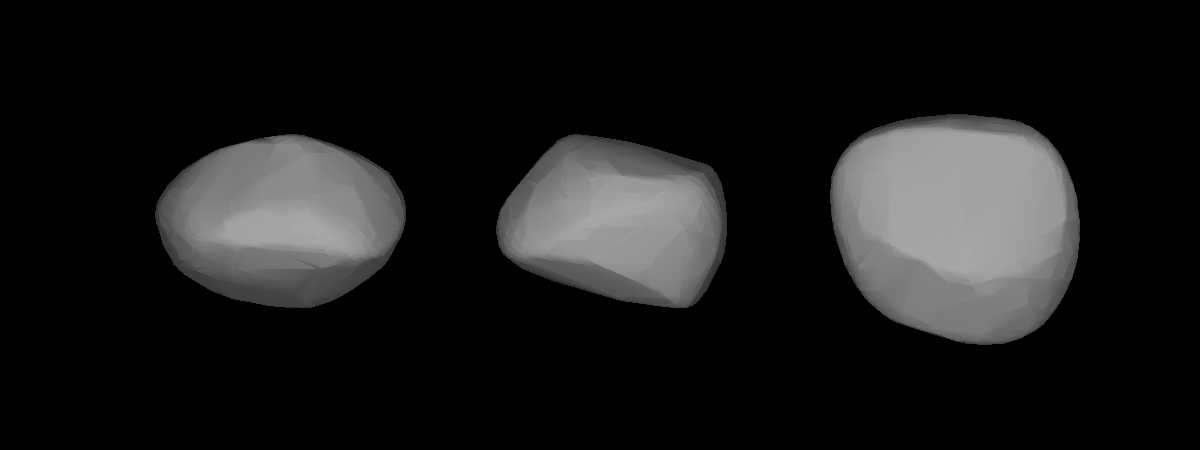
- A three-dimensional model of 690 Wratislavia based on its light curve

Discovery
- Discovered by: Joel Hastings Metcalf
- Discovery site: Taunton, Massachusetts
- Discovery date: 16 October 1909

Designations
- Pronunciation: /vrætɪˈslɑːviə/
- Named after: Wrocław
- Alternative designations: 1909 HZ

Orbital characteristics
- Epoch 31 July 2016 (JD 2457600.5)
- Uncertainty parameter 0
- Observation arc: 113.75 yr (41547 d)
- Aphelion: 3.7163 AU (555.95 Gm)
- Perihelion: 2.5737 AU (385.02 Gm)
- Semi-major axis: 3.1450 AU (470.49 Gm)
- Eccentricity: 0.18166
- Orbital period (sidereal): 5.58 yr (2037.2 d)
- Mean anomaly: 53.487°
- Mean motion: 0° 10^{m} 36.192^{s} / day
- Inclination: 11.266°
- Longitude of ascending node: 253.160°
- Argument of perihelion: 114.819°

Physical characteristics
- Mean radius: 67.325±1.9 km; 73.105±5.51 km (composite estimate)
- Mass: (1.63±0.49)×10^{18} kg (Note: Calculated from its standard gravitational parameter GM = 0.109±0.033 km^{3}/s^{2}.)
- Mean density: 1.27 g/cm^{3} (Note: Assuming a diameter of 135 km.)
- Synodic rotation period: 8.64 h (0.360 d)
- Geometric albedo: 0.0604±0.004
- Absolute magnitude (H): 8.02

690 Wratislavia is a minor planet orbiting the Sun. Wratislavia was discovered on October 16, 1909. IRAS data shows it is about 135 km in diameter.

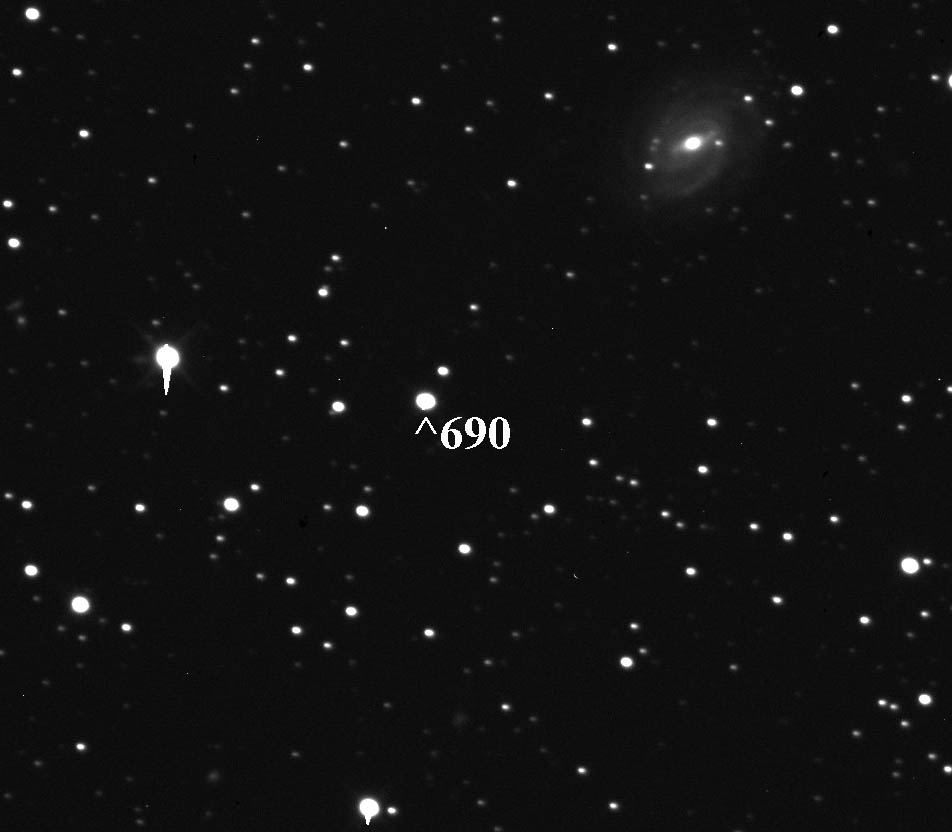
Asteroid 690 Wratislavia (apparent magnitude 12.9) near the galaxy NGC 6941.

Wratislavia has been studied by radar.
