= 741 Botolphia =

Main-belt asteroid

Discovery
- Discovered by: Joel Hastings Metcalf
- Discovery date: 10 February 1913

Designations
- Pronunciation: /boʊˈtɒlfiə/
- Named after: Saint Botolph
- Alternative designations: 1913 QT; A909 HA; 1973 GN
- Minor planet category: Main belt

Orbital characteristics
- Epoch 31 July 2016 (JD 2457600.5)
- Uncertainty parameter 0
- Observation arc: 107.00 yr (39080 d)
- Aphelion: 2.91350 AU (435.853 Gm)
- Perihelion: 2.52742 AU (378.097 Gm)
- Semi-major axis: 2.72046 AU (406.975 Gm)
- Eccentricity: 0.070958
- Orbital period (sidereal): 4.49 yr (1,638.9 d)
- Mean anomaly: 8.49527°
- Mean motion: 0° 13^{m} 10.758^{s} / day
- Inclination: 8.41179°
- Longitude of ascending node: 100.761°
- Argument of perihelion: 62.7093°

Physical characteristics
- Mean radius: 14.82±0.65 km
- Synodic rotation period: 23.93 h (0.997 d)
- Geometric albedo: 0.1391±0.014
- Temperature: ~169 K
- Spectral type: X
- Absolute magnitude (H): 10.1

741 Botolphia is a 29.6-km diameter minor planet (specifically an asteroid) orbiting in the asteroid belt, discovered by American astronomer Joel Hastings Metcalf on 10 February 1913 from Winchester. It is named after Saint Botolph, the semi-legendary founder of a 7th-century monastery that would become the town of Boston, Lincolnshire, England. This asteroid is orbiting at a distance of 2.72 AU from the Sun, with an orbital period of 4.49 yr and an eccentricity (ovalness) of 0.07. The orbital plane is inclined at an angle of 8.41° to the ecliptic.

Photometric data collected during 2007 were used to produce an asteroid light curve showing a rotation period of 23.93±0.02 h, with a brightness amplitude of 0.015 in magnitude. This result is consistent with earlier results by independent observers. 741 Botolphia was initially classified as an X-type asteroid, but it may instead belong to the M-type taxonomy.
