= 747 Winchester =

Asteroid orbiting the Sun

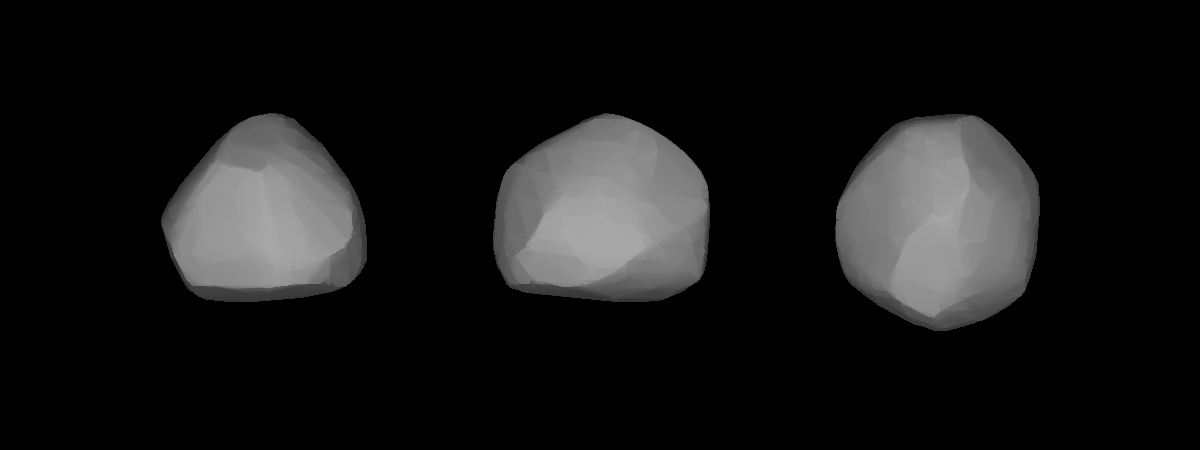
- A three-dimensional model of 747 Winchester based on its light curve

Discovery
- Discovered by: Joel Hastings Metcalf
- Discovery site: Winchester, Massachusetts
- Discovery date: 7 March 1913

Designations
- Pronunciation: /ˈwɪntʃɪstər/
- Alternative designations: 1913 QZ
- Adjectives: Winchestrian /wɪnˈtʃɛstriən/

Orbital characteristics
- Epoch 31 July 2016 (JD 2457600.5)
- Uncertainty parameter 0
- Observation arc: 103.11 yr (37662 d)
- Aphelion: 4.0220 AU (601.68 Gm)
- Perihelion: 1.9802 AU (296.23 Gm)
- Semi-major axis: 3.0011 AU (448.96 Gm)
- Eccentricity: 0.34019
- Orbital period (sidereal): 5.20 yr (1899.0 d)
- Mean anomaly: 59.0474°
- Mean motion: 0° 11^{m} 22.488^{s} / day
- Inclination: 18.165°
- Longitude of ascending node: 130.081°
- Argument of perihelion: 275.511°

Physical characteristics
- Mean diameter: 171 ± 15 km
- Mass: (4.45±0.48)×10^{18} kg (Note: Calculated from its standard gravitational parameter GM = 0.297±0.032 km^{3}/s^{2}.)
- Mean density: 1.70±0.48 g/cm^{3} (calculated)
- Synodic rotation period: 9.41480 h (0.392283 d)
- Pole ecliptic longitude: 304°
- Pole ecliptic latitude: −60°
- Geometric albedo: 0.0503±0.002
- Absolute magnitude (H): 7.69

747 Winchester is an asteroid, a minor planet orbiting the Sun. It was discovered in 1913, and is named after the town in which it was discovered, Winchester, Massachusetts, in the USA.

Photometric observations of this asteroid at the Palmer Divide Observatory in Colorado Springs, Colorado in 2007 gave a light curve with a period of 9.4146 ± 0.0002 hours and a brightness variation of 0.16 ± 0.02 in magnitude. This is reasonably consistent with independent results reported in 1983 (9.40h), 1993 (9.402h), and 2007 (9.334h).
