= 696 Leonora =

Main-belt asteroid

Discovery
- Discovered by: Joel Hastings Metcalf
- Discovery site: Taunton, Massachusetts
- Discovery date: 10 January 1910

Designations
- Alternative designations: 1910 JJ
- Minor planet category: main-belt · (outer); Meliboea

Orbital characteristics
- Epoch 31 July 2016 (JD 2457600.5)
- Uncertainty parameter 0
- Observation arc: 95.46 yr (34866 d)
- Aphelion: 3.9660 AU (593.31 Gm)
- Perihelion: 2.3753 AU (355.34 Gm)
- Semi-major axis: 3.1707 AU (474.33 Gm)
- Eccentricity: 0.25085
- Orbital period (sidereal): 5.65 yr (2062.2 d)
- Mean anomaly: 307.652°
- Mean motion: 0° 10^{m} 28.452^{s} / day
- Inclination: 13.036°
- Longitude of ascending node: 299.519°
- Argument of perihelion: 104.093°

Physical characteristics
- Mean radius: 37.88±1 km
- Mass: (7.5±7.5)×10^{17} kg (Note: Calculated from its standard gravitational parameter GM = 0.05±0.05 km^{3}/s^{2}.) (SB441)
- Mean density: 3.3±3.3 g/cm^{3} (calculated)
- Synodic rotation period: 26.8964 h (1.12068 d)
- Geometric albedo: 0.0773±0.004
- Absolute magnitude (H): 9.4

696 Leonora is a Meliboean asteroid orbiting the Sun in the asteroid belt. It was discovered 10 January 1910 by American astronomer Joel Hastings Metcalf, at Taunton, Massachusetts. It was named by Arthur Snow of the United States Naval Observatory, who computed the orbit for the planet, after his wife, Mary Leonora Snow.
