= 868 Lova =

Large and dark background asteroid

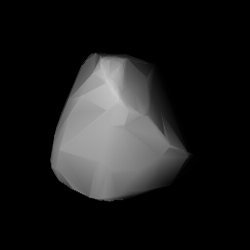
- Modelled shape of Lova from its lightcurve

Discovery
- Discovered by: M. F. Wolf
- Discovery site: Heidelberg Obs.
- Discovery date: 26 April 1917

Designations
- Named after: unknown
- Alternative designations: A917 HB · 1925 FB; 1957 EO · 1917 BU
- Minor planet category: main-belt · (middle); background

Orbital characteristics
- Epoch 31 May 2020 (JD 2459000.5)
- Uncertainty parameter 0
- Observation arc: 102.77 yr (37,538 d)
- Aphelion: 3.1052 AU
- Perihelion: 2.3031 AU
- Semi-major axis: 2.7041 AU
- Eccentricity: 0.1483
- Orbital period (sidereal): 4.45 yr (1,624 d)
- Mean anomaly: 224.48°
- Mean motion: 0° 13^{m} 18.12^{s} / day
- Inclination: 5.8386°
- Longitude of ascending node: 115.78°
- Argument of perihelion: 286.74°

Physical characteristics
- Dimensions: 43.3 km × 64.3 km
- Mean diameter: 50.692±0.191 km; 52.47±1.5 km; 55.45±0.73 km
- Synodic rotation period: 41.118±0.011 h
- Geometric albedo: 0.048±0.002; 0.0524±0.003; 0.056±0.006
- Spectral type: Tholen = C: SMASS = Ch; B–V = 0.711±0.020; U–B = 0.362±0.030
- Absolute magnitude (H): 10.3

868 Lova (prov. designation: A917 HB or 1917 BU) is a large and dark background asteroid, approximately 51 kilometers (32 miles) in diameter, from the central regions of the asteroid belt. It was discovered by German astronomer Max Wolf at the Heidelberg-Königstuhl State Observatory on 26 April 1917. The carbonaceous C-type asteroid (Ch) and has a long rotation period of 41.1 hours and is likely elongated in shape. The origin of the asteroid's name remains unknown.

== Orbit and classification ==
Lova is a non-family asteroid of the main belt's background population when applying the hierarchical clustering method to its proper orbital elements. It orbits the Sun in the central asteroid belt at a distance of 2.3–3.1 AU once every 4 years and 5 months (1,624 days; semi-major axis of 2.7 AU). Its orbit has an eccentricity of 0.15 and an inclination of 6° with respect to the ecliptic. The body's observation arc begins at Heidelberg Observatory on 3 March 1930, almost 13 years after its official discovery observation.

== Naming ==
This minor planet was named by the discoverer. Any reference of this name to a person or occurrence is unknown.

=== Unknown meaning ===
Among the many thousands of named minor planets, Lova is one of 120 asteroids, for which no official naming citation has been published. All of these low-numbered asteroids have numbers between 164 Eva and 1514 Ricouxa and were discovered between 1876 and the 1930s, predominantly by astronomers Auguste Charlois, Johann Palisa, Max Wolf and Karl Reinmuth.

== Physical characteristics ==
In the Tholen classification, Lova is a common, dark C-type asteroid with a noisy spectrum (:), while in the Bus–Binzel SMASS classification, it is a hydrated, carbonaceous subtype (Ch).

=== Rotation period ===
In November 2017, a rotational lightcurve of Lova was obtained from photometric observations by Tom Polakis at the Command Module Observatory (V02) in Arizona. Lightcurve analysis gave a well-defined rotation period of 41.118±0.011 hours with a brightness variation of 0.28±0.01 magnitude (U=3). While not being a slow rotator, which have periods of 100 or more hours, Lova's period is significantly longer than the vast majority of asteroids, which rotate within 2.2 to 20 hours once around their axis.

A lower-rated lightcurve by French amateur astronomer Laurent Bernasconi gave a similar period of 41.3±0.2 hours with a higher amplitude of 0.40±0.01 magnitude, indicative of an elongated shape (U=2). The results supersede a period determination with a lower limit of 24 hours and amplitude of at least 0.11 magnitude by Brian Warner at his Palmer Divide Observatory in Colorado from November 1999 (U=2). In 2006, Warner revised his photometric data, though with no notable improvement or change for this asteroid. (Note: Lightcurve plot of 868 Lova, Palmer Divide Observatory, B. D. Warner (1999). Rotation period larger than 24 hours with a brightness amplitude of more than 0.11 mag. Quality code of 2. Summary figures for (868) Lova at the LCDB. The result has been superseded by a period of 41.118 hours.)

=== Diameter and albedo ===
According to the surveys carried out by the NEOWISE mission of NASA's Wide-field Infrared Survey Explorer (WISE), the Infrared Astronomical Satellite IRAS, and the Japanese Akari satellite, Lova measures (50.692±0.191), (52.47±1.5) and (55.45±0.73) kilometers in diameter and its surface has an albedo of (0.056±0.006), (0.0524±0.003) and (0.048±0.002), respectively. The Collaborative Asteroid Lightcurve Link adopts the results from IRAS, that is, a low albedo of 0.0524 and a diameter of 52.47 kilometers based on an absolute magnitude of 10.22. Alternative mean-diameter measurements published by the WISE team include (49.742±17.318 km), (50.057±12.98 km), (51.194±0.567 km) and (59.77±19.19 km) with corresponding albedos of (0.0400±0.02), (0.0400±0.0411), (0.0550±0.0072) and (0.03±0.01).

Two asteroid occultations, observed on 5 April 2006 and 12 July 2007, gave a best-fit ellipse dimension of (52.0 × 52.0) and (43.3 × 64.3) kilometers, respectively, with the latter being the better rated one. These timed observations are taken when the asteroid passes in front of a distant star.
