= 599 Luisa =

Main-belt asteroid

Discovery
- Discovered by: Joel Hastings Metcalf
- Discovery site: Taunton, Massachusetts
- Discovery date: 25 April 1906

Designations
- Alternative designations: 1906 UJ

Orbital characteristics
- Epoch 31 July 2016 (JD 2457600.5)
- Uncertainty parameter 0
- Observation arc: 109.96 yr (40163 d)
- Aphelion: 3.5859 AU (536.44 Gm)
- Perihelion: 1.9676 AU (294.35 Gm)
- Semi-major axis: 2.7768 AU (415.40 Gm)
- Eccentricity: 0.29140
- Orbital period (sidereal): 4.63 yr (1690.1 d)
- Mean anomaly: 232.49°
- Mean motion: 0° 12^{m} 46.836^{s} / day
- Inclination: 16.692°
- Longitude of ascending node: 44.204°
- Argument of perihelion: 293.980°

Physical characteristics
- Mean radius: 32.435±0.95 km
- Mass: (9.6±3.3)×10^{17} kg (Note: Calculated from its standard gravitational parameter GM = 0.064±0.022 km^{3}/s^{2}.)
- Mean density: 5.27 g/cm^{3} (Note: Assuming a diameter of 70.2 km.)
- Synodic rotation period: 9.566 h (0.3986 d)
- Geometric albedo: 0.1377±0.008
- Absolute magnitude (H): 8.71

599 Luisa is a minor planet orbiting the Sun.
