= 675 Ludmilla =

Main-belt asteroid

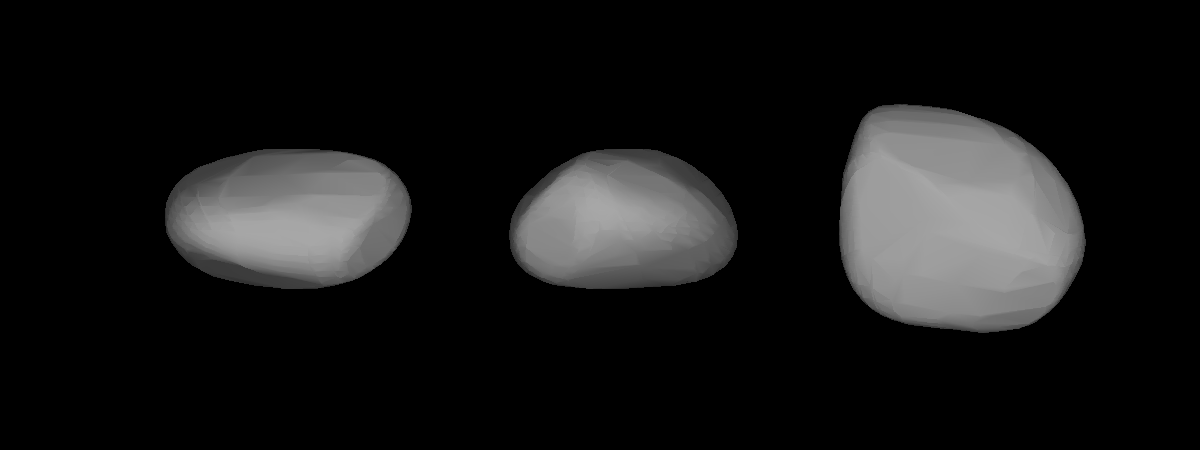
- A three-dimensional model of 675 Ludmilla based on its light curve

Discovery
- Discovered by: Joel Hastings Metcalf
- Discovery site: Taunton, Massachusetts
- Discovery date: 30 August 1908

Designations
- Alternative designations: 1908 DU

Orbital characteristics
- Epoch 31 July 2016 (JD 2457600.5)
- Uncertainty parameter 0
- Observation arc: 98.67 yr (36039 d)
- Aphelion: 3.3308 AU (498.28 Gm)
- Perihelion: 2.2150 AU (331.36 Gm)
- Semi-major axis: 2.7729 AU (414.82 Gm)
- Eccentricity: 0.20120
- Orbital period (sidereal): 1,686.5 d (4.62 yr) 4.62 yr (1686.5 d)
- Mean anomaly: 98.9547°
- Mean motion: 0° 12^{m} 48.456^{s} / day
- Inclination: 9.7796°
- Longitude of ascending node: 263.200°
- Argument of perihelion: 152.391°

Physical characteristics
- Mean radius: 76 km 67.66±0.94 km
- Mass: (6.47±3.14)×10^{17} kg
- Mean density: 3.99±1.94 g/cm^{3}
- Synodic rotation period: 7.717 h (0.3215 d)
- Spectral type: S
- Absolute magnitude (H): 7.91

675 Ludmilla is a stony (S-type) minor planet orbiting the Sun. It was named after Mikhail Glinka's opera Ruslan and Lyudmila. This asteroid is orbiting at a distance of 2.7729 AU from the Sun with an orbital eccentricity of 0.20 and a period of 4.62 yr. The orbital plane is inclined at an angle of 9.8° to the plane of the ecliptic. 675 Ludmilla is spinning with a period of 7.717 h.

== Mass and density ==
In 2012, a study by Benoît Carry gave a meta-estimate of a mass of (1.20±0.24)×10^{19} kg for Ludmilla, based on a single study of its gravitational influence on other Solar System bodies. However, given Ludmilla's diameter of 67.7 km (42.1 mi), this mass implies an extremely high density 73.99±15.05 g/cm^{3}. Such a high density is unphysical, so this mass and density estimate of Ludmilla has been rejected by Carry. Because of Ludmilla's small size, its gravitational influence on other bodies is extremely difficult to detect and may lead to highly inaccurate mass and density estimates. A more recent study in 2019 determined a mass of (6.47±3.14)×10^{17} kg for Ludmilla, which corresponds to a density of 3.99±1.94 g/cm^{3} for a diameter of 67.7 km (42.1 mi).
