= 662 Newtonia =

Main-belt asteroid

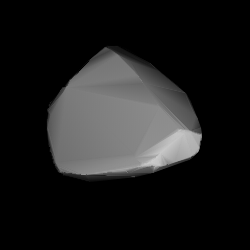
- Modelled shape of Newtonia from its lightcurve

Discovery
- Discovered by: Joel Hastings Metcalf
- Discovery site: Taunton, Massachusetts
- Discovery date: 30 March 1908

Designations
- Pronunciation: /njuːˈtoʊniə/
- Alternative designations: 1908 CW

Orbital characteristics
- Epoch 31 July 2016 (JD 2457600.5)
- Uncertainty parameter 0
- Observation arc: 106.37 yr (38852 d)
- Aphelion: 3.1060 AU (464.65 Gm)
- Perihelion: 1.9992 AU (299.08 Gm)
- Semi-major axis: 2.5526 AU (381.86 Gm)
- Eccentricity: 0.21678
- Orbital period (sidereal): 4.08 yr (1489.6 d)
- Mean anomaly: 124.757°
- Mean motion: 0° 14^{m} 30.012^{s} / day
- Inclination: 4.1202°
- Longitude of ascending node: 133.744°
- Argument of perihelion: 165.567°

Physical characteristics
- Mean radius: 11.81±0.75 km
- Synodic rotation period: 21.095 h (0.8790 d)
- Geometric albedo: 0.1999±0.028
- Absolute magnitude (H): 10.3

662 Newtonia is a minor planet, specifically an asteroid orbiting mostly in the asteroid belt.

The asteroid's major details are relatively unknown
