= 636 Erika =

Minor planet orbiting the sun

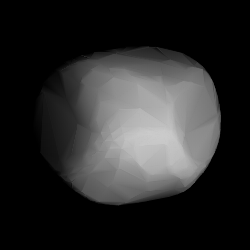
- Modelled shape of Erika from its lightcurve

Discovery
- Discovered by: Joel Hastings Metcalf
- Discovery site: Taunton, Massachusetts
- Discovery date: 8 February 1907

Designations
- Alternative designations: 1907 XP

Orbital characteristics
- Epoch 31 July 2016 (JD 2457600.5)
- Uncertainty parameter 0
- Observation arc: 109.17 yr (39874 d)
- Aphelion: 3.4121 AU (510.44 Gm)
- Perihelion: 2.4133 AU (361.02 Gm)
- Semi-major axis: 2.9127 AU (435.73 Gm)
- Eccentricity: 0.17145
- Orbital period (sidereal): 4.97 yr (1815.7 d)
- Mean anomaly: 182.784°
- Mean motion: 0° 11^{m} 53.772^{s} / day
- Inclination: 7.9270°
- Longitude of ascending node: 34.644°
- Argument of perihelion: 297.818°

Physical characteristics
- Mean radius: 37.145±3.35 km
- Mass: (3.1±1.3)×10^{17} kg (Note: Calculated from its standard gravitational parameter GM = 0.021±0.009 km^{3}/s^{2}.)
- Mean density: 1.53 g/cm^{3} (Note: Assuming a diameter of 73.1 km.)
- Synodic rotation period: 14.603 h (0.6085 d)
- Geometric albedo: 0.0507±0.011
- Absolute magnitude (H): 9.6

636 Erika is a minor planet orbiting the Sun.
