= 1003 Lilofee =

Main-belt asteroid

Discovery
- Discovered by: K. Reinmuth
- Discovery site: Heidelberg Obs.
- Discovery date: 13 September 1923

Designations
- Named after: Lilofee (mermaid in German folklore)
- Alternative designations: 1923 OK · 1937 FB; 1940 TA · 1951 QO; 1951 RA_{2} · 1957 WD_{2} 1962 QH · A915 HB
- Minor planet category: main-belt · (outer); Themis

Orbital characteristics
- Epoch 4 September 2017 (JD 2458000.5)
- Uncertainty parameter 0
- Observation arc: 93.81 yr (34,263 days)
- Aphelion: 3.6414 AU
- Perihelion: 2.6373 AU
- Semi-major axis: 3.1394 AU
- Eccentricity: 0.1599
- Orbital period (sidereal): 5.56 yr (2,032 days)
- Mean anomaly: 211.31°
- Mean motion: 0° 10^{m} 37.92^{s} / day
- Inclination: 1.8402°
- Longitude of ascending node: 139.45°
- Argument of perihelion: 317.42°

Physical characteristics
- Dimensions: 27.29±1.83 km 32.292±0.334 km 33.1±3.3 km 33.678±0.334 km 34.04 km (calculated); 36±4 km
- Synodic rotation period: 8.230±0.004 h 8.24991±0.00005 h 8.250±0.001 h (Note: Lightcurve plot of (1003) Lilofee by R. D. Stephens (2013) at CS3. Rotation period 8.250±0.001 hours with a brightness amplitude of 0.54±0.02 mag. Summary figures at Collaborative Asteroid Lightcurve Link); 8.2506±0.0003 h 8.255±0.002 h
- Geometric albedo: 0.07±0.01; 0.08±0.02; 0.130±0.020; 0.1406±0.0213; 0.198±0.028
- Spectral type: C
- Absolute magnitude (H): 10.20 · 10.50±0.22 · 10.70 · 10.8

Lilofee (minor planet designation: 1003 Lilofee), provisional designation 1923 OK, is a carbonaceous Themistian asteroid from the outer regions of the asteroid belt, approximately 33 kilometers in diameter. It was discovered on 13 September 1923, by astronomer Karl Reinmuth at the Heidelberg-Königstuhl State Observatory in southwest Germany. The asteroid was named after the Black Forest mermaid "Lilofee" from German folklore.

== Orbit and classification ==
Lilofee is a member of the Themis family (602), a very large family of carbonaceous, low-inclination asteroids, named after 24 Themis. It orbits the Sun in the outer main-belt at a distance of 2.6–3.6 AU once every 5 years and 7 months (2,032 days). Its orbit has an eccentricity of 0.16 and an inclination of 2° with respect to the ecliptic.

The asteroid was first identified as A915 HB at Bergedorf Observatory in April 1915. The body's observation arc begins with its official discovery observation at Heidelberg.

== Physical characteristics ==
Lilofee is an assumed carbonaceous C-type asteroid, which corresponds to the overall spectral type of the Themis family.

=== Lightcurves ===
Since 2004, several rotational lightcurves of Lilofee were obtained from photometric observations by astronomers René Roy, Enric Forné and Robert Stephens. Lightcurve analysis gave a rotation period of 8.255 hours with a brightness variation of 0.57 magnitude (U=2+/3/3).

In 2013, an international study modeled a lightcurve with a concurring period of 8.24991 hours and found a spin axis of (n.a., −99.0°) in ecliptic coordinates (λ, β).

=== Diameter and albedo ===
According to the surveys carried out by the Japanese Akari satellite and the NEOWISE mission of NASA's Wide-field Infrared Survey Explorer, Lilofee measures between 27.29 and 36 kilometers in diameter and its surface has an albedo between 0.07 and 0.198.

The Collaborative Asteroid Lightcurve Link adopts an albedo of 0.08 and calculates a diameter of 34.04 kilometers based on an absolute magnitude of 10.7.

== Naming ==
This minor planet was named after the legendary mermaid/neck Lilofee, who lived in the small Mummelsee of the Black Forest in southwest Germany. Lilofee is also the title figure in the German folk-song The beautiful young Lilofee ("Die schöne junge Lilofee") by August Schnezler (1809–1853).

The asteroid was named by the discoverer (RI 402). The name was proposed by ARI-astronomer Johannes Riem, after whom 1025 Riema was named. The official naming citation was also mentioned in The Names of the Minor Planets by Paul Herget in 1955 (H 96).
