= 691 Lehigh =

Asteroid orbiting the Sun

Discovery
- Discovered by: Joel Hastings Metcalf
- Discovery site: Taunton, Massachusetts
- Discovery date: 11 December 1909

Designations
- Pronunciation: /ˈliːhaɪ/
- Alternative designations: 1909 JG

Orbital characteristics
- Epoch 31 July 2016 (JD 2457600.5)
- Uncertainty parameter 0
- Observation arc: 101.40 yr (37038 d)
- Aphelion: 3.3787 AU (505.45 Gm)
- Perihelion: 2.6443 AU (395.58 Gm)
- Semi-major axis: 3.0115 AU (450.51 Gm)
- Eccentricity: 0.12194
- Orbital period (sidereal): 5.23 yr (1908.9 d)
- Mean anomaly: 189.349°
- Mean motion: 0° 11^{m} 18.924^{s} / day
- Inclination: 13.010°
- Longitude of ascending node: 87.997°
- Argument of perihelion: 304.466°

Physical characteristics
- Mean radius: 43.84±0.85 km
- Mass: (6.3±2.5)×10^{17} kg (Note: Calculated from its standard gravitational parameter GM = 0.042±0.017 km^{3}/s^{2}.)
- Mean density: 2.42 g/cm^{3} (Note: Assuming a diameter of 79.5 km.)
- Synodic rotation period: 12.891 h (0.5371 d)
- Geometric albedo: 0.0438±0.002
- Absolute magnitude (H): 9.2

691 Lehigh is an asteroid orbiting the Sun in the asteroid belt, discovered in 1909. It is named after Lehigh University, where its orbit was calculated in the Masters Thesis of Joseph B. Reynolds, following the observations of amateur astronomer Joel Metcalf. The asteroid is a CD:-type asteroid, suggesting its surface is largely carbonaceous, with many primitive molecules similar to those of comets. Due to this, it has a cometlike surface albedo of just 0.05, similar to fresh asphalt, meaning that it reflects only 5% of light that hits it. Lehigh is not known to be a member of any collisional asteroid family.
