= 603 Timandra =

Main-belt asteroid

Discovery
- Discovered by: Joel Hastings Metcalf
- Discovery site: Taunton, Massachusetts
- Discovery date: 16 February 1906

Designations
- Pronunciation: /tɪˈmændrə/
- Alternative designations: 1906 TJ

Orbital characteristics
- Epoch 31 July 2016 (JD 2457600.5)
- Uncertainty parameter 0
- Observation arc: 110.08 yr (40205 d)
- Aphelion: 2.9809 AU (445.94 Gm)
- Perihelion: 2.0947 AU (313.36 Gm)
- Semi-major axis: 2.5378 AU (379.65 Gm)
- Eccentricity: 0.17460
- Orbital period (sidereal): 4.04 yr (1476.7 d)
- Mean anomaly: 87.1291°
- Mean motion: 0° 14^{m} 37.644^{s} / day
- Inclination: 8.0265°
- Longitude of ascending node: 343.455°
- Argument of perihelion: 159.764°

Physical characteristics
- Mean radius: 6.865±0.45 km
- Synodic rotation period: 41.79 h (1.741 d)
- Geometric albedo: 0.1354±0.019
- Absolute magnitude (H): 11.8

603 Timandra is a minor planet orbiting the Sun that was discovered by American astronomer Joel Hastings Metcalf on February 16, 1906, in Taunton, Massachusetts.

Photometric observations of this asteroid at the Organ Mesa Observatory in Las Cruces, New Mexico, during 2010 gave a light curve with a long rotation period of 41.79 ± 0.02 hours and a brightness variation of 0.10 ± 0.02 in magnitude.
