= 889 Erynia =

Main-belt asteroid

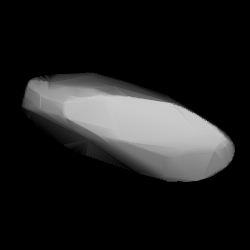
- Modelled shape of Erynia from its lightcurve

Discovery
- Discovered by: M. F. Wolf
- Discovery site: Heidelberg Obs.
- Discovery date: 5 March 1918

Designations
- Pronunciation: /ɛˈraɪniə/
- Named after: Erinyes, or Furies (Greek mythology)
- Alternative designations: A918 EN · 1929 BG; A912 PA · 1912 PA; 1918 DG
- Minor planet category: main-belt · (inner) background

Orbital characteristics
- Epoch 31 May 2020 (JD 2459000.5)
- Uncertainty parameter 0
- Observation arc: 101.81 yr (37,187 d)
- Aphelion: 2.9428 AU
- Perihelion: 1.9500 AU
- Semi-major axis: 2.4464 AU
- Eccentricity: 0.2029
- Orbital period (sidereal): 3.83 yr (1,398 d)
- Mean anomaly: 342.62°
- Mean motion: 0° 15^{m} 27.36^{s} / day
- Inclination: 8.1064°
- Longitude of ascending node: 132.53°
- Argument of perihelion: 278.52°

Physical characteristics
- Mean diameter: 16.682±0.154 km; 18.14±0.59 km
- Synodic rotation period: 9.89±0.01 h
- Pole ecliptic latitude: (187.0°, −60.0°) (λ_{1}/β_{1}); (335.0°, −74.0°) (λ_{2}/β_{2})
- Geometric albedo: 0.196±0.014; 0.230±0.042
- Spectral type: S (S3OS2-TH); Sl (S3OS2-BB)
- Absolute magnitude (H): 11.0

889 Erynia /ɛˈraɪniə/ is a highly elongated background asteroid from the inner regions of the asteroid belt. It was discovered on 5 March 1918, by German astronomer Max Wolf at the Heidelberg-Königstuhl State Observatory, and given the provisional designations A918 EN and 1918 DG. The stony S-type asteroid (Sl) has a rotation period of 9.89 hours and measures approximately 17 kilometers (11 miles) in diameter. It was named from Greek mythology, after the Erinyes, also known as Furies.

== Orbit and classification ==
Erynia is a non-family asteroid of the main belt's background population when applying the hierarchical clustering method to its proper orbital elements. It orbits the Sun in the inner asteroid belt at a distance of 2.0–2.9 AU once every 3 years and 10 months (1,398 days; semi-major axis of 2.45 AU). Its orbit has an eccentricity of 0.20 and an inclination of 8° with respect to the ecliptic. The asteroid was first observed as A912 PA (1912 PA) at the Johannesburg Observatory on 7 August 1912. The body's observation arc begins at Heidelberg Observatory on 16 March 1918, or eleven nights after its official discovery observation.

== Naming ==
This minor planet was named after one of the Erinyes from Greek mythology, also known as Furies in Roman mythology. The female deities of vengeance have snakes for hair, dog's heads, coal black bodies, bat's wings, and blood-shot eyes. They tortured their victims with brass-studded scourges and inflicted plagues. The naming was mentioned in The Names of the Minor Planets by Paul Herget in 1955 (H 86).

== Physical characteristics ==
In the Tholen-like taxonomy of the Small Solar System Objects Spectroscopic Survey (S3OS2), Erynia is a common stony S-type asteroid, while in the SMASS-like taxonomic variant of the survey, it is an Sl-subtype, which transitions from the S- to the uncommon L-type.

=== Rotation period and poles ===
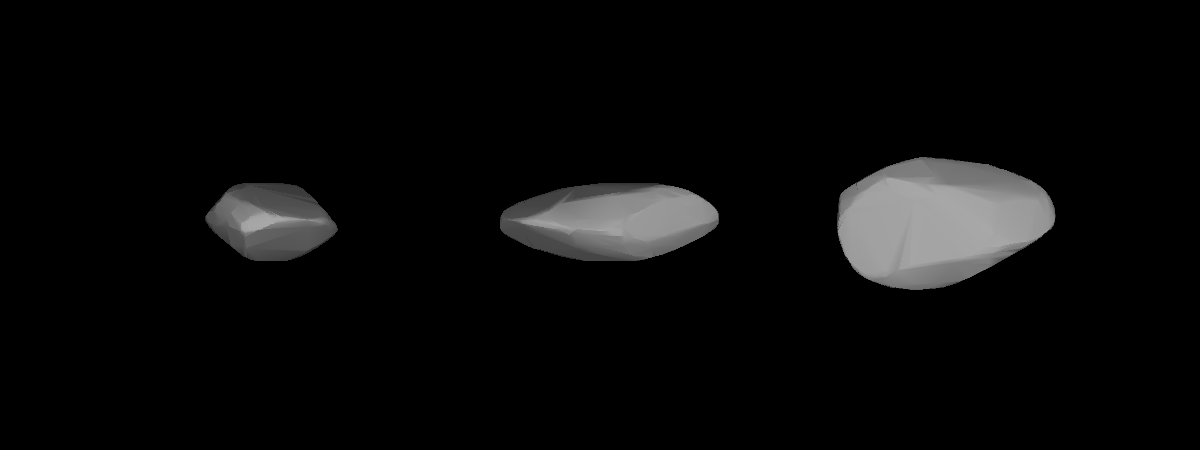
Lightcurve-based 3D-model of Erynia

In January 2002, a rotational lightcurve of Erynia was obtained from photometric observations by French astronomer Laurent Bernasconi. Lightcurve analysis gave a rotation period of 9.89±0.01 hours with a high brightness variation of 0.67±0.02 magnitude, indicative of a non-spherical, elongated shape (U=3). A concurring period of 9.872±0.0079 hours and an amplitude 0.47 magnitude was obtained by astronomers at the Palomar Transient Factory in April 2010 (U=2). In 2011, a modeled lightcurve using data from the Uppsala Asteroid Photometric Catalogue (UAPC) and other sources gave a sidereal period 9.8749±0.0005 hours, as well as two spin axes at (187.0°, −60.0°) and (335.0°, −74.0°) in ecliptic coordinates (λ, β).

=== Diameter and albedo ===
According to the survey carried out by the NEOWISE mission of NASA's Wide-field Infrared Survey Explorer (WISE) and the Japanese Akari satellite, Erynia measures (16.682±0.154) and (18.14±0.59) kilometers in diameter and its surface has an albedo of (0.230±0.042) and (0.196±0.014), respectively. The Collaborative Asteroid Lightcurve Link assumes a standard albedo for a stony asteroid of 0.20 and calculates a diameter of 18.75 kilometers based on an absolute magnitude of 11. The WISE team also published a mean-diameter of (17.386±0.181 km) with a corresponding albedo of (0.2171±0.0295).
