= 622 Esther =

Main-belt asteroid

Discovery
- Discovered by: Joel Hastings Metcalf
- Discovery site: Taunton, Massachusetts
- Discovery date: 13 November 1906

Designations
- Named after: Esther (biblical figure)
- Alternative designations: 1906 WP
- Minor planet category: main-belt · (inner)

Orbital characteristics
- Epoch 31 July 2016 (JD 2457600.5)
- Uncertainty parameter 0
- Observation arc: 109.40 yr (39959 d)
- Aphelion: 2.9999 AU (448.78 Gm)
- Perihelion: 1.8313 AU (273.96 Gm)
- Semi-major axis: 2.4156 AU (361.37 Gm)
- Eccentricity: 0.24189
- Orbital period (sidereal): 3.75 yr (1371.3 d)
- Mean anomaly: 93.681°
- Mean motion: 0° 15^{m} 45.072^{s} / day
- Inclination: 8.6435°
- Longitude of ascending node: 142.046°
- Argument of perihelion: 256.687°
- Earth MOID: 0.859795 AU (128.6235 Gm)
- Jupiter MOID: 2.48023 AU (371.037 Gm)
- T_{Jupiter}: 3.461

Physical characteristics
- Dimensions: 40 × 24 × 24 km ± 26% 29±8 km
- Sidereal rotation period: 47.5 h (1.98 d)
- Spectral type: S-type asteroid
- Absolute magnitude (H): 10.3

622 Esther is a minor planet orbiting the Sun.

The asteroid is named after the biblical figure Esther.

In 2001, the asteroid was detected by radar from the Arecibo Observatory at a distance of 1.11 AU. The resulting data yielded an effective diameter of 29 ± 8 km.
