= 694 Ekard =

Main-belt asteroid

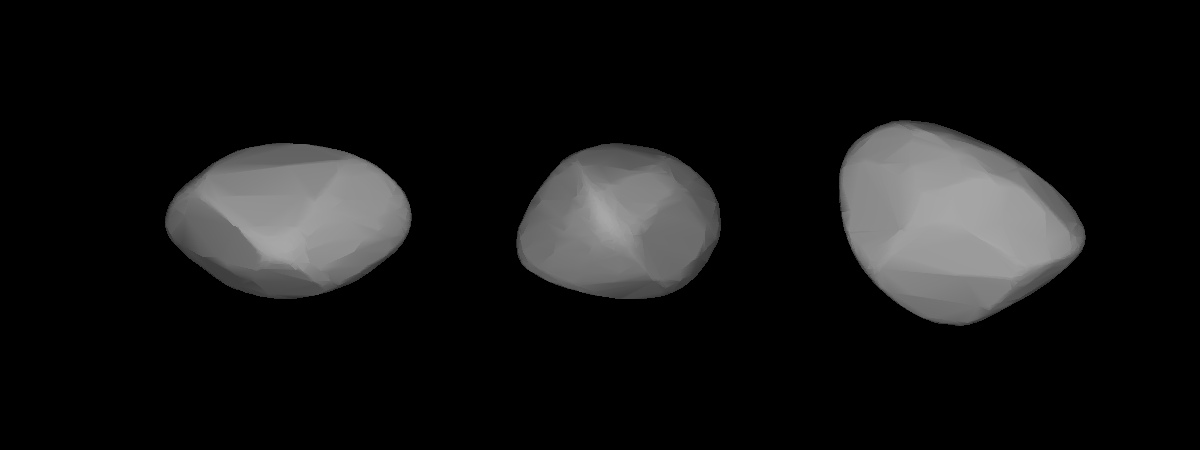
- A three-dimensional model of 694 Ekard based on its light curve

Discovery
- Discovered by: Joel Hastings Metcalf
- Discovery site: Taunton, Massachusetts
- Discovery date: 7 November 1909

Designations
- Alternative designations: 1909 JA

Orbital characteristics
- Epoch 31 July 2016 (JD 2457600.5)
- Uncertainty parameter 0
- Observation arc: 106.44 yr (38878 d)
- Aphelion: 3.5372 AU (529.16 Gm)
- Perihelion: 1.8114 AU (270.98 Gm)
- Semi-major axis: 2.6743 AU (400.07 Gm)
- Eccentricity: 0.32265
- Orbital period (sidereal): 4.37 yr (1597.4 d)
- Mean anomaly: 201.11°
- Mean motion: 0° 13^{m} 31.332^{s} / day
- Inclination: 15.849°
- Longitude of ascending node: 230.116°
- Argument of perihelion: 111.400°

Physical characteristics
- Mean diameter: 93.95±4.82 km (composite estimate); 121.891±0.721 km 90.78 km
- Mass: (1.0±1.0)×10^{18} kg (Note: Calculated from its standard gravitational parameter GM = 0.07±0.07 km^{3}/s^{2}.) (SB441)
- Mean density: 1.1–2.7 g/cm^{3} (calculated)
- Synodic rotation period: 5.925 h (0.2469 d)
- Geometric albedo: 0.046; 0.026±0.003
- Absolute magnitude (H): 9.25; 9.17

694 Ekard is a minor planet orbiting the Sun that was discovered by American astronomer Joel Hastings Metcalf on November 7, 1909. The asteroid's name comes from the reverse spelling of Drake University in Des Moines, Iowa, where Seth Barnes Nicholson and his wife calculated its orbit.

Photometric observations of this asteroid gave a light curve with a period of 5.925 hours and a brightness variation of 0.50 in magnitude. Measurements of the thermal inertia of 694 Ekard give a value of around 100–140 J m^{−2} K^{−1} s^{−1/2}, compared to 50 for lunar regolith and 400 for coarse sand in an atmosphere.

13-cm radar observations of this asteroid from the Arecibo Observatory between 1980 and 1985 were used to produce a diameter estimate of 101 km. Four separate stellar occultation events involving this asteroid were observed from multiple sites in 2009. The resulting chords matched a least squares equivalent diameter of 90±6 km.
