= 673 Edda =

Main-belt stony S-type asteroid

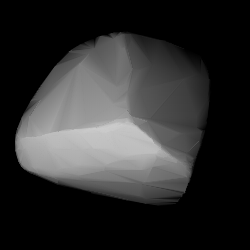
- Modelled shape of Edda from its lightcurve

Discovery
- Discovered by: Joel Hastings Metcalf
- Discovery site: Taunton, Massachusetts
- Discovery date: 20 September 1908

Designations
- Pronunciation: /ˈɛdə/
- Alternative designations: 1908 EA

Orbital characteristics
- Epoch 31 July 2016 (JD 2457600.5)
- Uncertainty parameter 0
- Observation arc: 107.57 yr (39290 d)
- Aphelion: 2.8471 AU (425.92 Gm)
- Perihelion: 2.7821 AU (416.20 Gm)
- Semi-major axis: 2.8146 AU (421.06 Gm)
- Eccentricity: 0.011542
- Orbital period (sidereal): 4.72 yr (1,724.7 d) 4.72 yr (1724.7 d)
- Mean anomaly: 199.04°
- Mean motion: 0° 12^{m} 31.428^{s} / day
- Inclination: 2.8770°
- Longitude of ascending node: 226.723°
- Argument of perihelion: 236.303°

Physical characteristics
- Mean radius: 18.765±0.5 km
- Synodic rotation period: 22.340 h (0.9308 d)
- Geometric albedo: 0.1044±0.006
- Absolute magnitude (H): 10.20

673 Edda is a minor planet orbiting the Sun. It was discovered 20 September 1908 by the American astronomer Joel Hastings Metcalf, and was named for the Norse Edda literary works. The name may also have been inspired by the asteroid's provisional designation 1908 EA. This asteroid is orbiting at a distance of 2.81 AU with a period of 4.72 yr and an eccentricity of 0.012. The orbit is close to a 5:2 mean motion resonance with Jupiter, which is located at 2.824 AU.

The long rotation period and low brightness amplitude of this asteroid make it more challenging for measurement of the rotation period. An extensive photometry campaign in 2015 provided a period of 22.340±0.004 h. The unusual light curve suggests that the asteroid shape is very asymmetric. It is a stony S-type asteroid with a mean diameter of 38+6
−2 km.
