= 637 Chrysothemis =

Main-belt asteroid

Discovery
- Discovered by: Joel Hastings Metcalf
- Discovery site: Taunton, Massachusetts
- Discovery date: 11 March 1907

Designations
- Pronunciation: /krɪˈsɒθɪmɪs/
- Alternative designations: 1907 YE

Orbital characteristics
- Epoch 31 July 2016 (JD 2457600.5)
- Uncertainty parameter 0
- Observation arc: 108.31 yr (39561 d)
- Aphelion: 3.5702 AU (534.09 Gm)
- Perihelion: 2.7782 AU (415.61 Gm)
- Semi-major axis: 3.1742 AU (474.85 Gm)
- Eccentricity: 0.12475
- Orbital period (sidereal): 5.66 yr (2065.7 d)
- Mean anomaly: 163.254°
- Mean motion: 0° 10^{m} 27.408^{s} / day
- Inclination: 0.27131°
- Longitude of ascending node: 353.465°
- Argument of perihelion: 172.704°

Physical characteristics
- Mean radius: 16.65 km
- Sidereal rotation period: 42.93±0.01 h
- Geometric albedo: 0.0633±0.016
- Absolute magnitude (H): 11.5

637 Chrysothemis is a Themistian asteroid, which means it is a member of the Themis asteroid family.

In 2025, a photometric study of this minor planet was used to produce a light curve showing a rotation period of 42.93±0.01 hours with a brightness variation of 0.31±0.02 in magnitude. The light curve is bimodal and asymmetric.
