= 756 Lilliana =

Main-belt asteroid

Discovery
- Discovered by: Joel Hastings Metcalf
- Discovery site: Taunton, Massachusetts
- Discovery date: 26 April 1908

Designations
- Alternative designations: 1908 DC
- Minor planet category: main belt

Orbital characteristics
- Epoch 31 July 2016 (JD 2457600.5)
- Uncertainty parameter 0
- Observation arc: 101.86 yr (37203 d)
- Aphelion: 3.66990 AU (549.009 Gm)
- Perihelion: 2.71910 AU (406.772 Gm)
- Semi-major axis: 3.19450 AU (477.890 Gm)
- Eccentricity: 0.148819
- Orbital period (sidereal): 5.71 yr (2085.5 d)
- Mean anomaly: 281.138°
- Mean motion: 0° 10^{m} 21.446^{s} / day
- Inclination: 20.3578°
- Longitude of ascending node: 208.088°
- Argument of perihelion: 5.26073°

Physical characteristics
- Mean radius: 35.75±0.7 km; 35.75 ± 0.7 km (22.21 ± 0.43 mi)
- Synodic rotation period: 9.361±0.002 h; 7.834 h (0.3264 d)
- Geometric albedo: 0.0500±0.002
- Absolute magnitude (H): 9.6; 9.9

756 Lilliana is a main-belt asteroid that was discovered by American astronomer Joel Hastings Metcalf on 26 April 1908 from Taunton, Massachusetts. It rotates around its axis of rotation every 9.36 hours.

Photometric observations of this asteroid at Palmer Divide Observatory in Colorado Springs, Colorado, during 2007 gave a light curve with a period of 9.262±0.001 hours and a brightness variation of 0.83±0.03 in magnitude. A 2012 study based upon observations at the Organ Mesa Observatory in Las Cruces, New Mexico, during 2012 produced a conflicting period of 7.834±0.001 hours and a brightness variation of 0.17±0.02 in magnitude. Further study will be needed to resolve the discrepancies in period and amplitude.
