= State Archives of North Carolina =

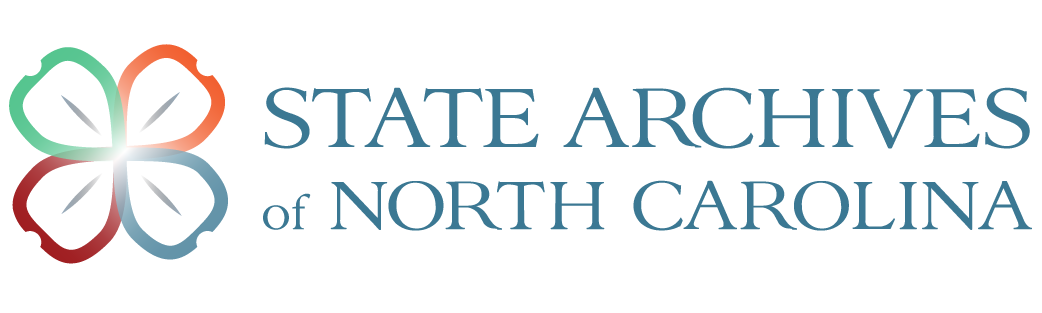

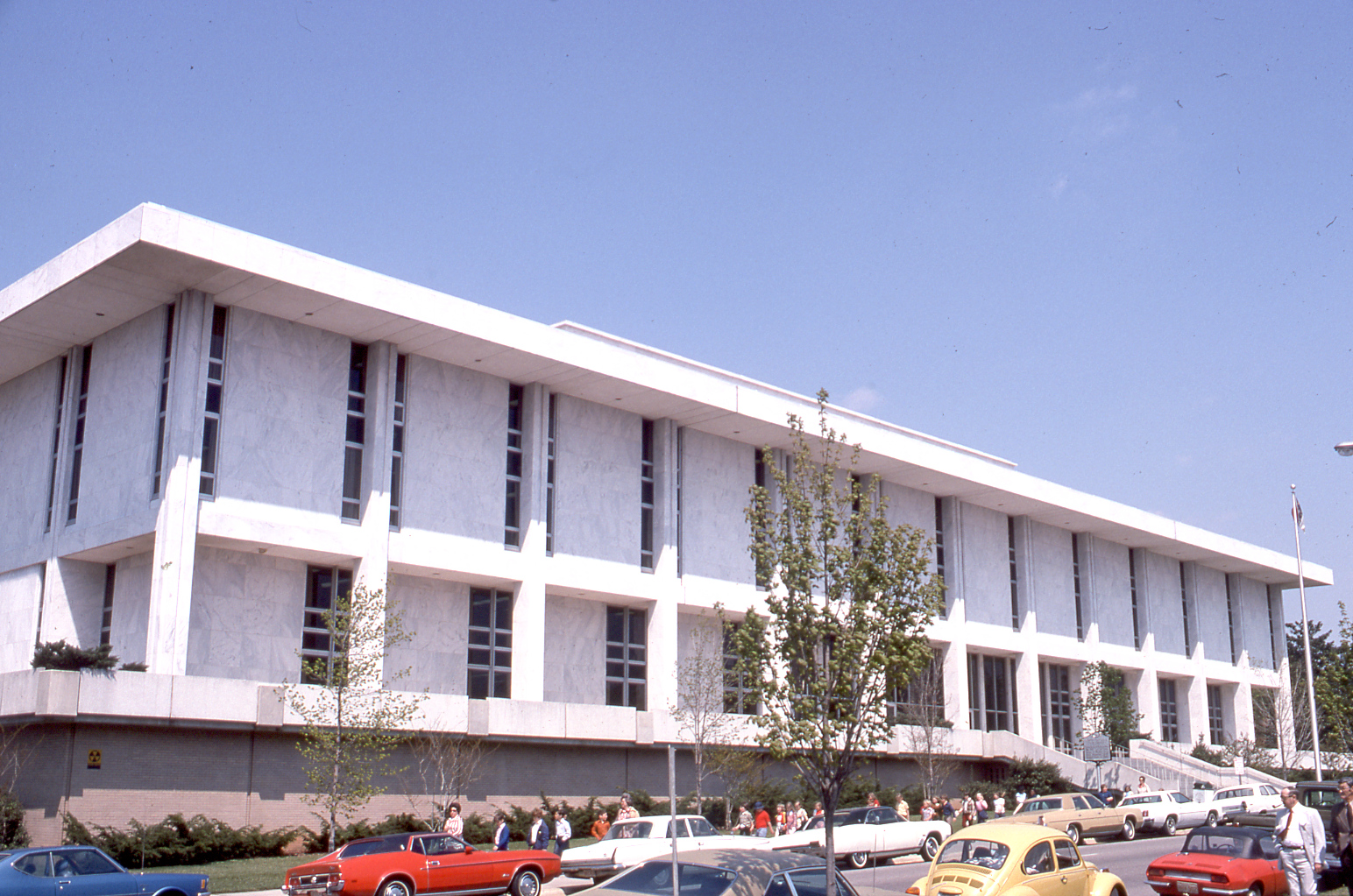

Division overview
- Formed: 1903
- Preceding agencies: Archives and Records Section (1972 - 2012); Department of Archives and History (1943 - 1972); North Carolina Historical Commission (1903 - 1943)
- Jurisdiction: State of North Carolina
- Headquarters: 109 East Jones Street; Raleigh, NC 27699-4601; 35°46′58″N 78°38′14″W
- Parent department: Department of Natural & Cultural Resources
- Website: www.archives.ncdcr.gov

The State Archives of North Carolina, officially the North Carolina Division of Archives and Records, is a division of North Carolina state government responsible for collecting, preserving, and providing public access to historically significant archival materials relating to North Carolina, and responsible for providing guidance on the preservation and management of public government records to state, county, city and state university officials. First founded as the North Carolina Historical Commission in 1903, the State Archives has undergone multiple changes in organization, title, and relation to other state agencies. Since May 2012, it has been known as the Division of Archives and Records within the North Carolina Department of Natural & Cultural Resources' Office of Archives and History.

The State Archives includes four sections: Collection Services, Government Records, Digital Services, and Special Collections. The Outer Banks History Center (Manteo, N.C.), Western Regional Archives (Asheville, N.C.), and the main site at 109 East Jones Street in Raleigh account for the Archives' three locations open to the public. The State Archives' Government Records Section is responsible for administering records management services to state government agencies, local government agencies, and state-supported institutions of higher education in North Carolina, in accordance with its legislative mandates in General Statutes 121 and 132. As part of its records management program, the Government Records Section is responsible for managing the State Records Center.

The State Archives houses over 50,000 linear feet of materials documenting North Carolina history, including government records and non-government materials. Government materials include records from state agencies, counties, and limited municipal records. Special collection materials (non-government materials) include individual and family papers (including extensive military collections), organizational records, records of defunct North Carolina educational institutions, and audio-visual collections. The State Archives currently collects government records in all formats, including born-digital materials ranging from documents, photographs, and videos to web archives and social media archives. It collaborates with the State Library of North Carolina to manage the North Carolina Digital Repository, which provides long-term archival preservation for born-digital and digitized government and non-government records and materials.

== History ==
=== Founding ===
The earliest predecessor of the State Archives was the North Carolina Historical Commission, founded in 1903 by the General Assembly in response to a request by the State Literary and Historical Association. North Carolina's Historical Commission was the third state historical agency founded in the U.S., following the 1901 founding of the Alabama Department of Archives and History and the 1902 founding of the Mississippi Department of Archives and History. Originally composed of five gubernatorial appointees and given an annual budget of $500, the Historical Commission was asked to "collect, edit and publish valuable documents elucidating the history of the State." It gained its first secretary R. D. W. Connor in 1907. Connor would go on to serve as the first Archivist of the United States.

=== Legislation ===
1903 - The North Carolina Historical Commission was formed by Chapter 767 of the North Carolina Public Laws.

1907 - Among other changes, an amendment to the original act charged the commission with new duties, including marking and preserving historic sites and encouraging the study of North Carolina history.

1935 - The General Assembly charged the commission with a new duty, to safeguard public records that no longer had "significance, importance, or value." This new responsibility was codified in Chapter 265 of Public Law, "An Act to Safeguard Public Records in North Carolina," which defined public records within North Carolina and made it illegal to sell, loan, or destroy public records without the permission of the Historical Commission. This act served as the state's first public records law.

1961 - Chapter 132 of the NC General Statutes (G.S. 132), known as the Public Records Act, replaced the 1935 legislation as the state's public records law. Along with defining public records (including electronic records) and specifying rules for the management of those records, the act expanded the State Archives' responsibilities for records management.

1973 - Chapter 121 of the NC General Statutes (G.S. 121), known as the Archives and History Act, made the Department of Cultural Resources (the new parent agency of the State Archives) the official "archival and historical agency of the State of North Carolina." The law defined the powers and duties of the department, including the programs of the State Archives. G.S. 121, along with G.S. 132, set forth the legislative mandates of the State Archives.

=== Name changes ===
In 1943, the General Assembly changed the name of the Historical Commission to the State Department of Archives and History. The newly minted Department continued to have a governing board, which would now be called the Executive Board of Archives and History.

In 1971, Governor Scott initiated an administrative reorganization to consolidate state agencies. As part of this consolidation, in February 1972, the Department of Archives and History merged with several other departments to form the new Department of Cultural Resources (briefly known as the Department of Art, Culture, and History from February 1972 to May 1973). Under this new department, the former Department of Archives and History came to be known as the Division of Archives and History, now a unit within the Department of Cultural Resources. The new Division of Archives and History was a large and expanding division, and in 1972 several sections were formed, including the Archives and Records Section. The Archives and Records Section, informally known as the "State Archives," continued operating under this name through May 2012, when the State Archives became its own departmental division, the Division of Archives and Records. During a similar period, the State Archives began referring to itself as the State Archives of North Carolina (instead of the North Carolina State Archives, which was often confused with the North Carolina State University archives).

=== Bill of Rights ===
In 1865, North Carolina's copy of the United States Bill of Rights was stolen from the state Capitol building by a Union soldier in William Sherman's army, who took the document home to Tippecanoe, Ohio, as a souvenir of the war. The soldier, whose name is unknown, sold the Bill of Rights to a Charles A. Shotwell of Troy, Ohio, for $5.00. It was not returned to North Carolina until Governor Mike Easley and state Attorney General Roy Cooper worked with the U.S. Attorney to obtain the document through an FBI sting operation in 2003.

== Online Resources ==
Much of the State Archives' materials can only be accessed at one of its three sites. However, a large body of materials can be found online, and online finding aids and catalog can help researchers identify materials that are available only onsite.

=== North Carolina Digital Collections ===
The North Carolina Digital Collections portal contains over 90,000 historic and recent photographs, state government publications, manuscripts, and other resources on topics related to North Carolina. The collections are free and full-text searchable, and bring together content from the State Archives of North Carolina and the State Library of North Carolina.

=== Catalog ===
The State Archives online catalog is called DOC, or Discover Online Catalog. It contains searchable descriptions of the holdings of all three of the Archives sites.

=== Finding Aids ===
The State Archives also makes available online traditional finding aids with detailed information about collections. The finding aids can be found at the State Archives Finding Aids webpage.

== Locations ==
- Raleigh - 109 E. Jones St., Raleigh, N.C. 27601
- Outer Banks History Center - 1 Festival Park Boulevard, Manteo, NC 27954
- Western Regional Archives - 176 Riceville Rd., Asheville, NC 28805

== Divisions within the Department of Cultural Resources's Office of Archives and History ==
- Division of Archives and Records (State Archives)
- Division of State Historic Sites and Properties
- Division of Historical Resources
  - Historical Publications
  - Historic Preservation Office
  - Office of State Archaeology
  - Highway Marker Program
  - North Carolina Connecting to Collections
  - North Carolina Literary and Historical Association
  - North Carolina Historical Day
  - North Carolina Historical Commission
  - Western Office in Asheville
- Division of State History Museums
  - North Carolina Museum of History
  - Graveyard of the Atlantic Museum in Hatteras
  - Museum of the Albemarle in Elizabeth City
  - Museum of the Cape Fear Historical Complex in Fayetteville
  - Mountain Gateway Museum and Heritage Center in Old Fort
  - North Carolina Maritime Museum in Beaufort and Southport
- Roanoke Island Festival Park Commission in Manteo
- Battleship North Carolina Commission in Wilmington
- Tryon Palace Commission in New Bern
