= North Carolina Department of Natural and Cultural Resources =

Agency of the State of North Carolina, United States

- Logo of the North Carolina Department of Natural and Cultural Resources

Agency overview
- Formed: 1971
- Jurisdiction: State of North Carolina
- Headquarters: 109 East Jones Street MSC 4601 Raleigh, NC 27699-4601
- Agency executive: Pamela Brewington Cashwell, Secretary
- Website: www.ncdcr.gov

The North Carolina Department of Natural and Cultural Resources is a cabinet-level department within the state government of North Carolina dedicated to overseeing projects in the arts, culture, and history within the borders of the state. The current Secretary of Natural and Cultural Resources, the cabinet-level officer who oversees the department, is Pamela Brewington Cashwell.

== History ==
The department was founded as the North Carolina Department of Art, Culture, and History. It became operational on January 25, 1972. Its first secretary was Sam Ragan, poet and arts advocate who later became North Carolina Poet Laureate. It was renamed to Department of Cultural Resources in 1973. In 1973, Grace Rohrer succeeded Ragan, becoming the first woman to hold a cabinet-level office in North Carolina.

Many of the offices and divisions of the department were founded as separate institutions, such as the State Library of North Carolina, founded in 1812, the North Carolina Museum of History, founded in 1902, and the North Carolina Symphony, founded in 1943. These organizations either remained independent or were gradually combined under the Office of Archives and History until 1971, when the Department of Cultural Resources became the first cabinet-level office of any state in the United States to deal solely with history, the arts, and cultural knowledge.

On September 18, 2015, the Department of Cultural Resources was renamed the Department of Natural and Cultural Resources. The name change came with a transfer of several divisions to the department, including North Carolina's state parks, aquariums, zoological park, museum of natural sciences, the Clean Water Trust Fund and the North Carolina Natural Heritage Program.

== Property and holdings ==
The Department of Natural and Cultural Resources supervises and cares for a large number of historic sites, documents, pieces of art, and other items and places of cultural value for the state. The State Archives, for instance, contain over 100 million historic documents, including North Carolina's copy of the United States Bill of Rights and the original 1663 charter for the colony as granted by Charles II of England. Perhaps the most prominent building supervised by the department is the North Carolina State Capitol, an 1840 Greek Revival building that contains a substantial number of historic artifacts, furniture, and monuments related to the history of North Carolina. The North Carolina General Assembly's appropriation in 1947 of $1 million for the purchase of artworks and sculpture to be housed in the Museum of Art made it the first state in the nation to use public funds for the purpose of building a state art collection

== Department structure ==
The department is organized in the following manner (all divisions located in Raleigh unless otherwise noted):

Office of Archives and History

- State Archives of North Carolina (formally known as the Division of Archives and Records)
  - Outer Banks History Center in Manteo
  - Western Regional Archives in Asheville
  - State Historical Records Advisory Board
- Division of State Historic Sites and Properties: manages 24 historic sites throughout the state and indirectly oversees and coordinates with the 3 historic commissions
- Division of Historical Resources
  - State Historic Preservation Office
  - Office of State Archaeology
  - Office of Historical Research, coordinating the North Carolina Highway Historical Marker Program Archived 2015-02-05 at the Wayback Machine and Historical Publications unit (distributed through Longleaf Services and the University of North Carolina Press)
    - North Carolina Historical Review, an academic journal on North Carolina history
  - the agency's Western Office service branch in Asheville, North Carolina
- Division of State History Museums
  - North Carolina Museum of History
  - Graveyard of the Atlantic Museum in Hatteras
  - Museum of the Albemarle in Elizabeth City
  - Museum of the Cape Fear Historical Complex in Fayetteville
  - Mountain Gateway Museum and Heritage Center in Old Fort
  - North Carolina Maritime Museum in Beaufort and Southport
- Roanoke Island Festival Park Commission in Manteo
- Battleship North Carolina Commission in Wilmington
- Tryon Palace Commission in New Bern

Office of Arts and Libraries

- North Carolina Arts Council
- North Carolina Museum of Art
  - Southeastern Center for Contemporary Art in Winston-Salem
- North Carolina Symphony
- State Library of North Carolina
  - Government and Heritage Library
  - Library Development
  - Library for the Blind and Physically Handicapped

Division of Land and Water Stewardship

- North Carolina Clean Water Management Trust Fund
- North Carolina Natural Heritage Program

Division of North Carolina Museum of Natural Sciences

- N.C. Museum of Natural Sciences in Raleigh
- N.C. Museum of Natural Sciences in Whiteville

Division of North Carolina Zoo
Division of State Aquariums
Division of State Parks and Recreation

== Other responsibilities ==
The Department of Natural and Cultural Resources also oversees the North Carolina Award.

== Secretaries ==
The current secretary is Pamela Brewington Cashwell, who was appointed in January 2025 by Governor Josh Stein. She succeeded D. Reid Wilson. Wilson succeeded Susi Hamilton, who served as secretary from 2017 to 2020.

== See also ==
- Government of North Carolina
