= Museum of the Albemarle =

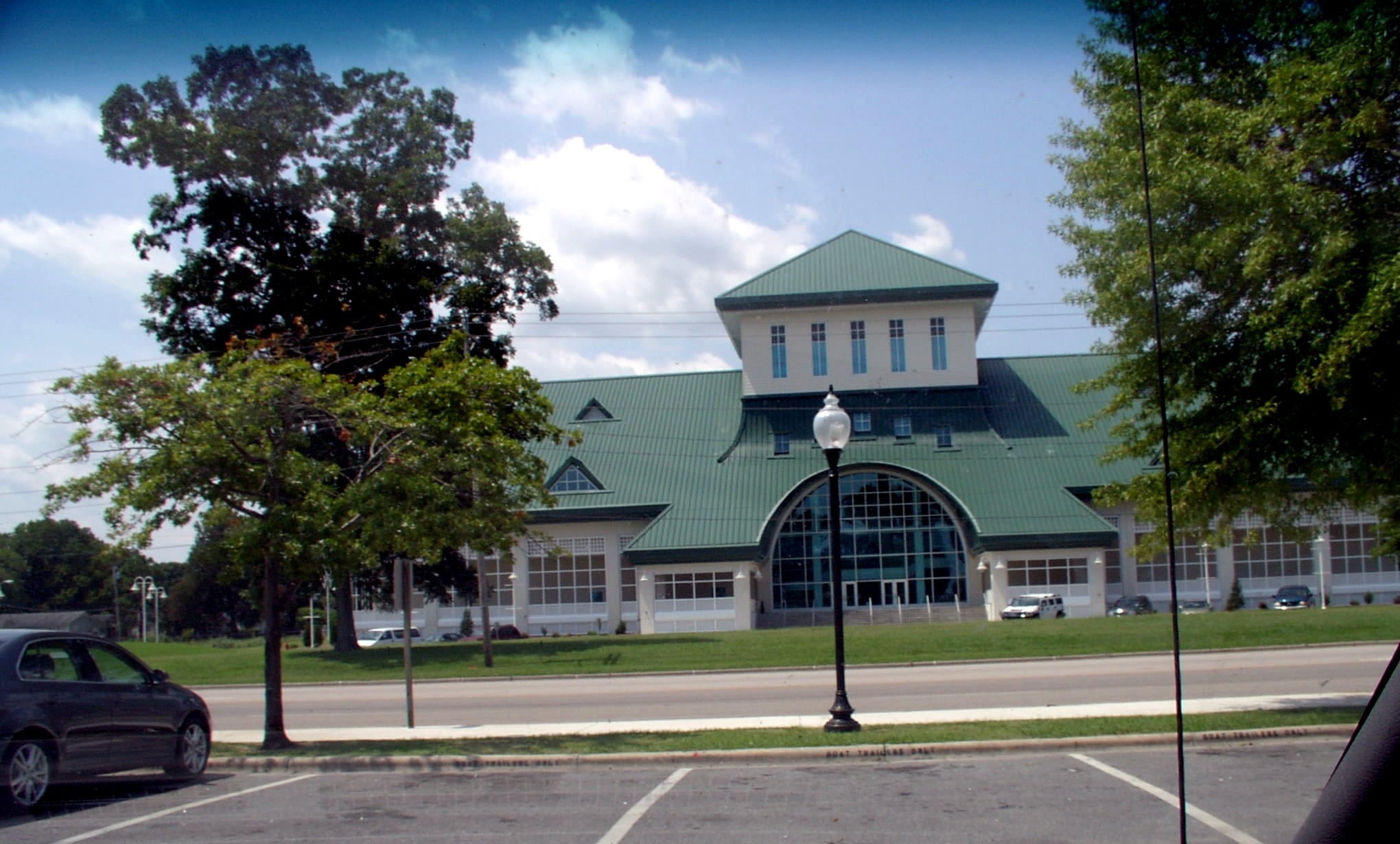
- Museum of the Albemarle viewed from Waterfront Park

- Location within North Carolina Museum of the Albemarle (the United States)
- Established: 1967
- Coordinates: 36.17°N 76.13°W
- Type: history museum
- Website: http://www.museumofthealbemarle.com

The Museum of the Albemarle is located in Elizabeth City, North Carolina. It serves as the northeastern regional branch of the North Carolina Museum of History. This area of North Carolina is sometimes considered the birthplace of English North America, with close proximity to Roanoke Island and the "Lost Colony' of 1585.

Established in 1967 in a former NC Highway Patrol station south of Elizabeth City, the Museum has since expanded with a new four-story museum building in 2008 located on the Downtown Waterfront.

The core exhibit is "Our Story - Life in the Albemarle", a 6200 sq. ft. gallery featuring over 700 artifacts that interpret the rich history and culture of the 16-county Albemarle region of northeastern North Carolina.

Other branches of The North Carolina Museum of History include:

- North Carolina Museum of History - (Raleigh)
- Graveyard of the Atlantic Museum - (Hatteras)
- Museum of the Cape Fear Historical Complex - (Fayetteville)
- Mountain Gateway Museum and Heritage Center - (Old Fort)
- North Carolina Maritime Museum - (Beaufort, Southport)
