= Brewington =

Brewington may refer to:

- Brewington (surname), English surname
- 5799 Brewington, main-belt asteroid
- Brewington Creek, a river in Texas
