= Brewington (surname) =

Brewington is an English surname. Notable people with this surname include:

- Howard J. Brewington (born 1952), American astronomer
- Jamie Brewington (born 1971), American baseball player
- Jim Brewington (born 1939), American football player
- Pamela Brewington, American politician
