= C/1989 W1 (Aarseth–Brewington) =

Hyperbolic comet

Discovery
- Discovered by: Knut Aarseth; Howard J. Brewington
- Discovery date: 16 November 1989

Designations
- Alternative designations: 1989a_{1} 1989 XXII

Orbital characteristics
- Epoch: 5 December 1989 (JD 2447865.5)
- Observation arc: 151 days
- Earliest precovery date: 1 September 1989
- Number of observations: 73
- Perihelion: 0.301 AU
- Eccentricity: 1.00006
- Inclination: 88.386°
- Longitude of ascending node: 345.917°
- Argument of periapsis: 205.259°
- Last perihelion: 27 December 1989
- Earth MOID: 0.6678 AU
- Jupiter MOID: 0.1682 AU

Physical characteristics
- Mean radius: 0.817 km (0.508 mi) (Note: Calculated mean radius using the formula: $\log_{10}\,(\,R\,)\ =\;0.9 +\;0.13 (\,H\,)$ Where $\,H\,$ is the comet's absolute total magnitude (M1))
- Comet total magnitude (M1): 7.6
- Apparent magnitude: 2.8 (1989 apparition)

C/1989 W1 (Aarseth–Brewington) is a non-periodic comet discovered on 16 November 1989 independently by Knut Aarseth and Howard Brewington. It reached an apparent magnitude of 2.8.

== Observational history ==
Norwegian amateur astronomer Knut B. Aarseth discovered a diffuse object near Iota Coronae Borealis on 16 November 1989 with his 14-cm reflector during his comet searching routine. He estimated it had a magnitude of 8.5. American astronomer Howard J. Brewington found the comet independently a few hours later with his 40-cm reflector while looking for comets from Sumter National Forest, South Carolina. This was his first discovery. He determined the magnitude at about 9. The discovery of the comet was confirmed by several observers the next days. Mauro Zanotta spotted the comet on 18 November, unaware of the prior discoveries.

The comet upon discovery was located 49° from the Sun and moving southwards. It was well observed the rest of November, with the comet brightening to a magnitude of 7.5 by the end of the month and its tail was reported to be up to one degree long. Most observations of the comet occurred in December, as the comet approached Earth to distance of 0.94 AU on 26 December 1989, while perihelion was on 27.9 December. The minimum solar elongation was on 27 December, at 18 degrees. The comet was reported to brighten to a magnitude of 2.8 on 20 December and fading the next days. Alan Hale reported on 18 December that the comet was visible by naked eye. Other observers also reported viewing the comet naked eye up until 29 December. The tail of the comet was reported to be 2.7 degrees long on 17 December. Two tails were reported, one dust tail and one ion tail.

The comet faded rapidly in January 1990, as it was observed from the southern hemisphere at the end of 1989 and on 8 January 1990 the comet reached its southernmost declination, at -46°. Βy the end of the month its apparent magnitude was reported to be about 9. It was last seen on 31 January 1990.

== See also ==
- 97P/Metcalf–Brewington
- C/1991 Y1 (Zanotta–Brewington)
