= North Carolina Cabinet =

State officials in the United States

The North Carolina Cabinet are heads of the executive departments of the Government of North Carolina. All cabinet secretaries are appointed by the governor.

== History ==
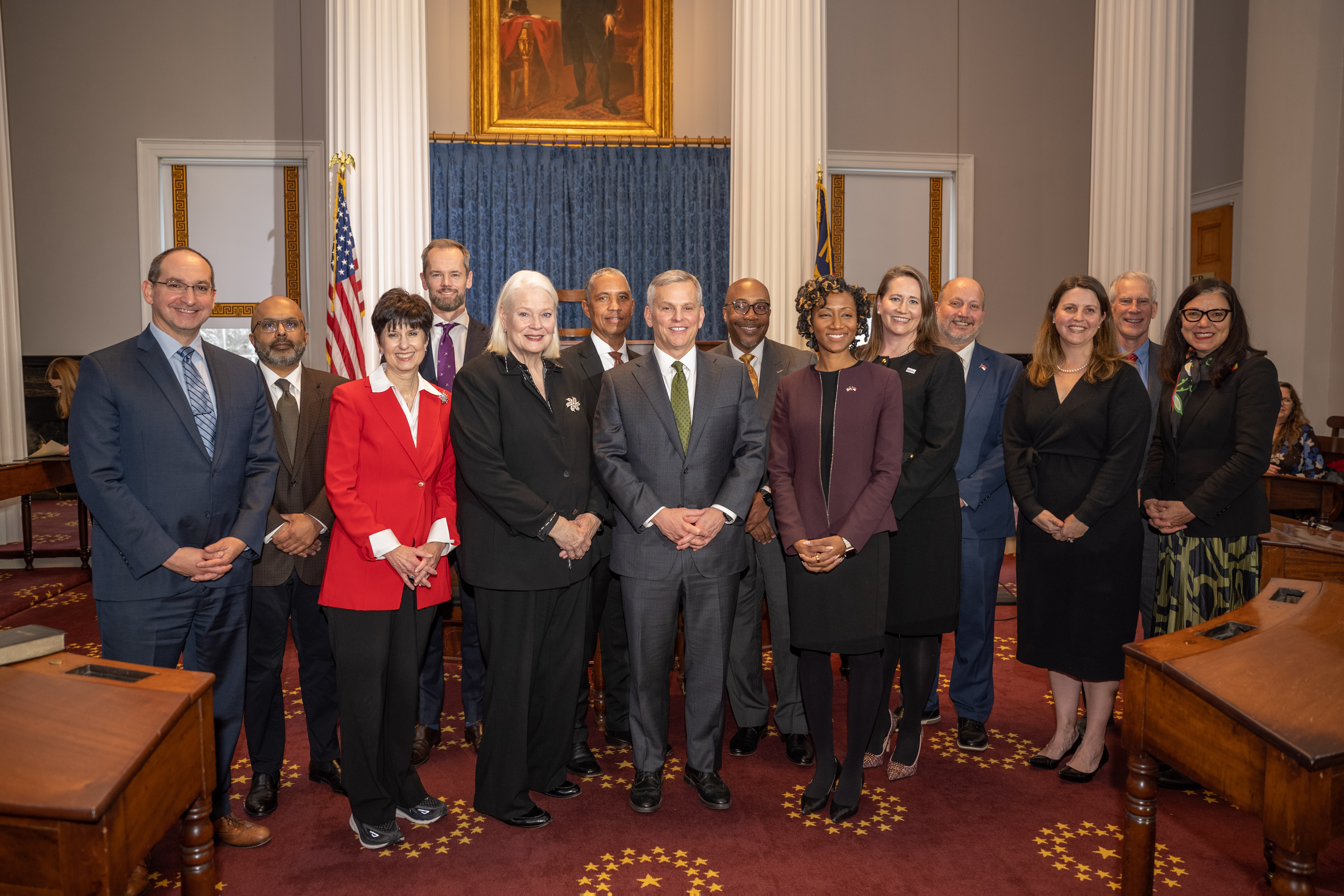
Governor Stein with the North Carolina Cabinet members in 2025

On June 26, 1972, North Carolina Governor Robert W. Scott created the "Executive Cabinet," an advisory body consisting of the members of the North Carolina Council of State, the appointed secretaries of the state's executive departments, and miscellaneous members appointed by the governor.

The Cabinet's size decreased by two on Jan. 1, 2012, when three Cabinet-level agencies, the North Carolina Department of Crime Control and Public Safety, the North Carolina Department of Correction and the North Carolina Department of Juvenile Justice and Delinquency Prevention, were merged to become the North Carolina Department of Public Safety.

The Cabinet then expanded by two secretaries in 2015, with the creation of two new Departments: Information Technology, and Military and Veterans Affairs. Then the Cabinet increased by one in 2022, with the creation of the new Department of Adult Correction. In 2025, Governor Josh Stein announced a Cabinet of 13 members, including the directors of the Office of State Human Resources and the Office of State Budget and Management.

== Current members ==
The current cabinet includes the following positions:

Position	Formed	Incumbent
Secretary of Adult Correction	2022	Leslie Cooley Dismukes
Secretary of Administration	1957	Gabe Esparza
Secretary of Commerce	1971	Lee Lilley
Secretary of Environmental Quality	2015	D. Reid Wilson
Secretary of Health and Human Services	1971	Dev Sangvai
Secretary/Chief Information Officer, Department of Information Technology	2015	Nate Denny
Secretary of Military and Veterans Affairs	2015	Jocelyn Mitnaul Mallette
Secretary of Natural and Cultural Resources	1971	Pamela Brewington Cashwell
Secretary of Public Safety	1977	Jeffrey Smythe
Secretary of Revenue	1921	McKinley Wooten, Jr.
Secretary of Transportation	1979	Daniel Johnson

The governor's chief of staff also meets with the cabinet.

== Works cited ==
- Fleer, Jack D. (1994). North Carolina Government & Politics. Lincoln: University of Nebraska Press. ISBN 9780803268852.
