= Grace Rohrer =

Arts and women's rights activist and politician

Grace Jemison Rohrer-Huff

Secretary of Administration of North Carolina
- In office 1985–1987
- Governor: James G. Martin
- Preceded by: Jane S. Patterson
- Succeeded by: James S. Lofton

Secretary of Cultural Resources of North Carolina
- In office January 5, 1973 – January 10, 1977
- Governor: James Holshouser
- Preceded by: Sam Ragan
- Succeeded by: Sara W. Hodgkins

Personal details
- Born: Grace Jemison; June 14, 1924 Chicago, Illinois, US
- Died: October 12, 2011 (aged 87) Boone, North Carolina, US
- Party: Republican
- Spouse(s): Robert H. Rohrer (d. 1964); Don Huff
- Education: Western Maryland College (BA); Wake Forest University (MA)

Grace Rohrer (full name: Grace Jemison Rohrer-Huff; June 14, 1924 – October 12, 2011), was an American educator, arts and women's rights activist, and politician who served as the first woman to hold a state cabinet-level position in North Carolina when she was appointed Secretary of Cultural Resources by Governor James Holshouser from 1973 to 1977. A Republican, she also served as Secretary of Administration under James G. Martin from 1985 to 1987.

== Early life and education ==
Rohrer was born Grace Jemison on June 14, 1924, in Chicago, Illinois. Her parents were Howard A. Jemison and the former Caroline Elmore Bishop. Rohrer attended high school in Cranford, New Jersey, then graduated from Western Maryland College with a B.A. degree in 1946. She would return to school later in life after her first husband died and receive her M.A. from Wake Forest University in 1969.

== Early career ==
Rohrer became an elementary school teacher after graduating from Western Maryland College. She excelled in arts promotion in Forsyth County, North Carolina, being a member of the Winston-Salem Symphony Guild. She also served as a singer and choir member for St. Paul's Episcopal Church in Winston-Salem as well as the Singers' Guild in Winston-Salem.

== Political career ==
Rohrer became active in civic affairs while in Winston-Salem and in the 1960s started working with local Republican party committees. Rohrer ran for a seat on the Forsyth County School Board as a Republican, but lost. She moved up in party hierarchy over time, even getting her father involved: Howard Jemison served several terms in the North Carolina House of Representatives for Forsyth County.

In the early 1970s, there was a growing split in the North Carolina Republican Party between supporters of James Holshouser and James Gardner for governor in 1972. Rohrer, a Holshouser supporter, was beat out for the chairmanship of the party by Gardner supporter Frank Rouse. Rohrer then became vice chairman of the party and during 1972 was interim chair when Rouse decided to temporarily step aside to campaign for Gardner. She was instrumental in helping resolve the rift between the two party factions. Her first try for statewide office also came in 1972. That year, Rohrer ran for North Carolina Secretary of State. She would wind up losing to long-time Democratic incumbent Thad A. Eure in the general election, 55.92%–44.08%.

Actively encouraging more women to participate in politics, she became one of three candidates short-listed for the Nixon administration's choice for Treasurer of the United States in 1974. Francine Irving Neff was chosen for that position.

=== Secretary of Cultural Resources ===
After she lost the race for Secretary of State, newly elected governor Jim Holshouser decided to choose Rohrer to be head of the Department of Art, Culture and History. He also set about a program of government reorganization and renamed the department to be the Department of Cultural Resources. She served in the position from January 5, 1973 to January 10, 1977. Upon her appointment to the position, Rohrer became the first woman to hold a cabinet-level position in North Carolina. During her time in office, she created the Grassroots Arts Program, which helps bring arts programs to all 100 counties of North Carolina. This program still exists and is managed by the North Carolina Arts Council.

After leaving office, she became active in several community projects and was hired as an executive at Duke University. In between her serving as DCR Secretary and the North Carolina Secretary of Administration, she also served as an instructor at Salem College and as an executive with the American Musical Theater Center in Durham, North Carolina.

=== Secretary of Administration ===
When a Republican next won the governorship of North Carolina, it was James G. Martin who appointed Rohrer as his Secretary of Administration (another state cabinet-level post). She had just previously been a director at the University of North Carolina Center for Public Television. After leaving office, she took a position with Appalachian State University in Boone, North Carolina, in 1988, serving there until 1994.

=== Women's rights ===
Rohrer had been a lifelong proponent of both the arts and women's rights. She was very vocal in her support for North Carolina's passage of the Equal Rights Amendment, testifying before state legislative committees in support of the amendment. North Carolina did not, however, ratify the amendment. She was active in creating the Women's Forum of North Carolina in 1976 and, the next year, she led North Carolina's delegation to the National Women's Conference held in Houston.

== Personal life ==
Rohrer was married to Robert H. Rohrer who was a business executive and had three sons with him. He died in 1964, leaving Grace Rohrer to raise the three children alone. She was preceded in death by her son, David Allen Rohrer, age 24. She later married Don Huff and moved to Kennebunk, Maine with him. She died on October 12, 2011, at her home in Boone.

== Awards ==
In 1989, Rohrer received a Distinguished Women of North Carolina Award from the North Carolina Department of Administration and the North Carolina Council on the Status of Women. Governor Jim Martin presented the award.

Party political offices
Preceded by John Porter East	Republican nominee for North Carolina Secretary of State; 1972	Succeeded by Asa T. Spaulding Jr.
