= 97P/Metcalf–Brewington =

Jupiter-family comet

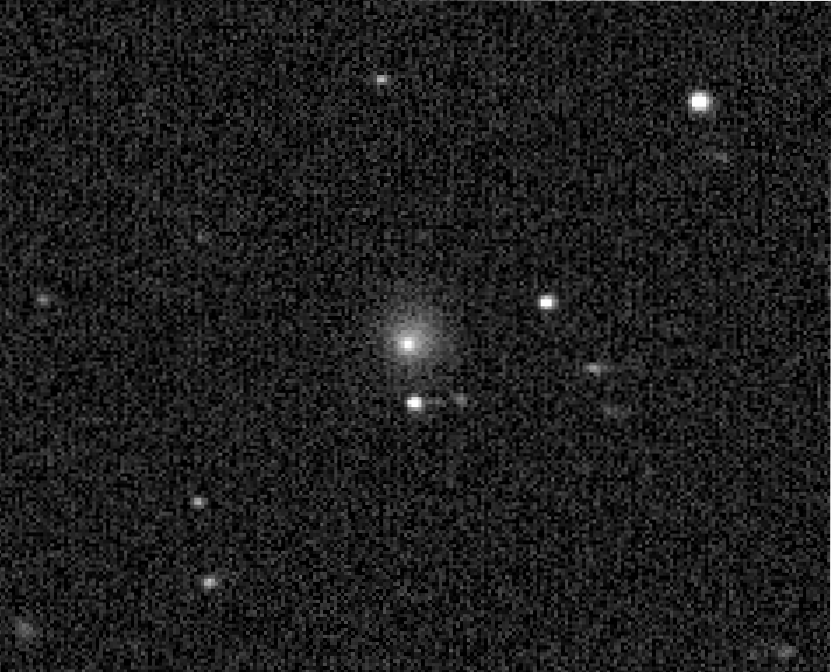
- Comet Metcalf–Brewington imaged by the Zwicky Transient Facility on 10 November 2021

Discovery
- Discovered by: Joel H. Metcalf; Howard J. Brewington
- Discovery site: Taunton, Massachusetts; Cloudcroft, New Mexico
- Discovery date: 10 October 1906; 7 January 1991

Designations
- MPC designation: P/1906 V2, P/1991 A1
- Alternative designations: 1906 VI, 1991 I; 1906h, 1991a

Orbital characteristics
- Epoch: 31 March 2024 (JD 2460400.5)
- Observation arc: 115.30 years (Note: Observation arc from the Minor Planet Center database only covered dates from 17 November 1906 until 28 January 2022 (115.20 years). The following figure represents the entire arc up to 10 October 1906.)
- Number of observations: 607
- Aphelion: 6.960 AU
- Perihelion: 2.572 AU
- Semi-major axis: 4.766 AU
- Eccentricity: 0.4593
- Orbital period: 10.406 years
- Inclination: 17.949°
- Longitude of ascending node: 184.08°
- Argument of periapsis: 230.10°
- Mean anomaly: 73.309°
- Last perihelion: 15 February 2022
- Next perihelion: 19 July 2032
- T_{Jupiter}: 2.710
- Earth MOID: 1.656 AU
- Jupiter MOID: 0.109 AU

Physical characteristics
- Mean radius: 2.36 km (1.47 mi)
- Mean density: 450±100 kg/m^{3}
- Comet total magnitude (M1): 13.7

97P/Metcalf–Brewington is a Jupiter-family comet originally discovered by Joel H. Metcalf in 1906 but subsequently lost. A new observation in 1991 by Howard J. Brewington was matched to the 1906 sighting; the orbit was computed and the comet was observed again on its returns to perihelion in 2001, 2011, and 2022.

== Observational history ==
=== 1906 discovery ===
On photographic plates taken on 15 November 1906, Joel H. Metcalf discovered the comet as a 12th-magnitude object within the constellation Eridanus. (Note: Reported initial position upon discovery was: α = 4^{h} 04.6^{m} , δ = –2° 17′)

=== 1914–1922 apparitions and loss ===
The comet passed about 0.86 AU (129 million km) from Jupiter in September 1911, perturbing its orbit enough for astronomers to revise their calculations for the 1914 and 1922 apparitions. Henrietta Swan Leavitt reported that she may have recovered Metcalf's comet in 1915, however the two images she took were later confirmed to be that of 393 Lampetia instead. The comet was never found after its last reported observation on 16 January 1907 and after a series of orbital calculations showed that viewing conditions were unfavorable on each subsequent apparition until 1975, it was declared lost after 1922.

=== 1991 rediscovery ===
Until 1975, Metcalf's comet was expected to appear no brighter than magnitude 18, although no attempts were made to find the comet due to unfavorable conditions. On 7 January 1991, Howard J. Brewington discovered a new comet within the constellation Cetus, (Note: Brewington found the comet in the following coordinates: α = 0^{h} 08.5^{m} , δ = –6° 00′) which was verified by Alan Hale in the same night. Following additional observations by Katsuhito Ohtsuka and Robert H. McNaught between 7 and 9 January 1991, Brian G. Marsden noted that the orbit of Brewington's comet strongly resembled that of Metcalf's comet in 1906, concluding that they are one and the same object. It is later determined that the previous calculations for the 1914 and 1922 apparitions were off by a few days and a couple months respectively, which caused the failure of this comet's recovery during those apparitions.

Analysis of its light-curve revealed that during its 1991 apparition, comet Metcalf–Brewington had experienced a massive outburst that had brightened the comet by 11 magnitudes, or a factor of 25,000. It was later determined that it might have been caused by thermal stresses on an exposed ice pocket rich in hydrogen cyanide (HCN) gas, which cracked the crust of its nucleus during perihelion.

=== Recent observations ===
Shortly after being recovered, revised orbital calculations for the comet has revealed that it made a close encounter with Jupiter at a distance of 0.11 AU (16 million km) in March 1993, where it was also predicted to return by 2000 or 2001.

In October 2021, the comet experienced an outburst that expelled material out to 19,400 km (12,100 mi) from its nucleus, resulting in a temporary rise in apparent magnitude from 18 to 16.

== See also ==
- C/1991 Y1 (Zanotta–Brewington)

== Bibliography ==
- Kronk, Gary W.; Meyer, Maik; Seargent, David A. J. (2007). Cometography: A Catalog of Comets. Vol. 3: 1900–1932. Cambridge University Press. ISBN 978-0-521-58506-4.
- Kronk, Gary W.; Meyer, Maik; Seargent, David A. J. (2017). Cometography: A Catalog of Comets. Vol. 6: 1983–1993. Cambridge University Press. ISBN 978-0-521-87216-4.

Numbered comets
Previous; 96P/Machholz	97P/Metcalf–Brewington	Next; 98P/Takamizawa
