= North Carolina Museum of History =

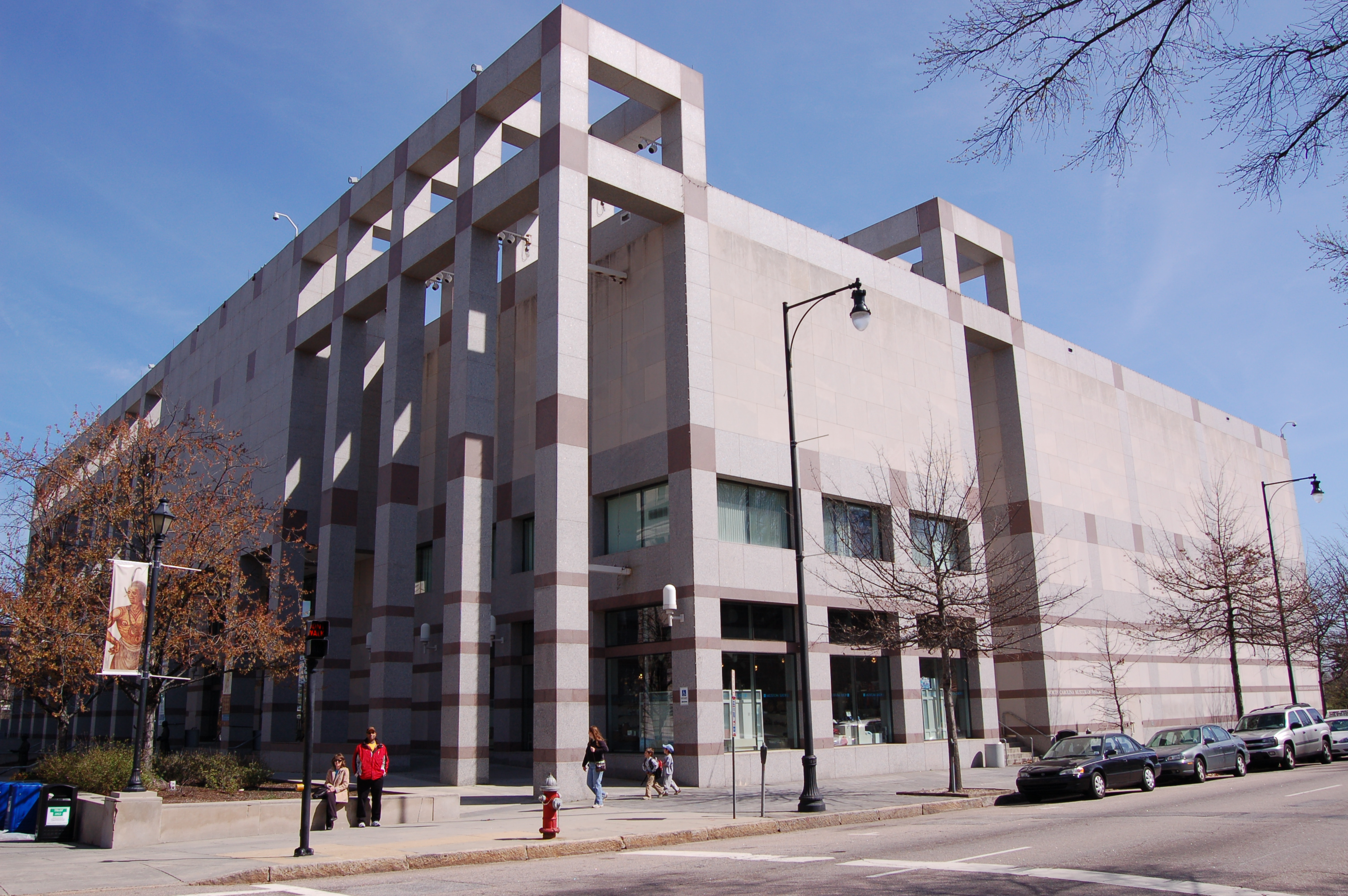
- The museum in 2008

- Location within North Carolina
- Established: 5 December 1902 (as "Hall of History") Reopened: c. 2028
- Dissolved: Temporary: May 1, 2024
- Location: Raleigh, NC
- Coordinates: 35.781523°N 78.638487°W
- Type: history museum
- Visitors: 579,236 (2017)
- Director: Ken Howard
- Website: http://www.ncmuseumofhistory.org

The North Carolina Museum of History is a temporarily closed history museum located in downtown Raleigh, North Carolina. It is an affiliate through the Smithsonian Affiliations program. The museum is a part of the Division of State History Museums, Office of Archives and History, an agency of the North Carolina Department of Cultural Resources.

== History ==
Frederick Augustus Olds, known as the "father" of the North Carolina Museum of History, began collecting items from across North Carolina in the late 19th century. He eventually traversed all 100 counties, at least once, and acquired not only pieces of the past but also the stories associated with them—starting a philosophy that exists to this day at the museum: using stories to relate the past of North Carolina. On December 5, 1902, Olds merged his large private collection with the collection owned and displayed in a room of the State Museum (which has evolved into the modern-day North Carolina Museum of Natural Sciences). The assortment of historical artifacts became known as the "Hall of History" and was opened to the public. The hall's 37 cases contained items as various as a studded shoe buckle owned by James Iredell to the death mask of Confederate General Robert Hoke. (To honor Olds, a metal statue has been erected on the steps of the current Museum of History building to greet visitors; he is joined by a statue of craftsman Thomas Day and a representative Sauratown woman.)

The North Carolina Historical Commission took over the Hall of History in 1914 and moved the collection to the Ruffin Building on the southwest corner of Union Square (where the North Carolina State Capitol sits); however, the hall quickly outgrew that space. The hall was then moved, in 1939, to the Education Building, across from the northwest corner of Union Square, where an area was specifically designed to accommodate both artifacts and exhibits. On July 1, 1965, with continued growth of the collection, need for expanded exhibit space, and an increase in staff, the Hall of History was renamed the North Carolina Museum of History and was identified to become a part of the new Archives and History/State Library Building. That move took place in 1968.

On June 16, 1988, the State of North Carolina broke ground at 5 East Edenton Street to begin construction of a new, dedicated building for the museum. Located in part of the block between the State Capitol and the Legislative Building, the museum's permanent home was completed in 1994 for more than $29 million. The new building features a research library, classrooms, a 315-seat auditorium, a design shop, conservation labs, artifact storage space, offices, the Museum Shop, and 55,000 square feet (5,100 m^{2}) of exhibit space on four floors.

On May 1, 2024, the museum closed for a major renovation project, stating that it will open in approximately 4 years.

== Tar Heel Junior Historian Association ==
One of the North Carolina Museum of History's best known outreach programs is the Tar Heel Junior Historian Association (THJHA).

Authorized by the North Carolina General Assembly in 1953, THJHA is a network of free clubs across the state, with members in grades 4–12 and at least one adult adviser. Clubs may be sponsored by public, private, or home schools, or by other organizations such as museums and historical societies, 4-H and FFA groups, or scouting programs. Clubs can be any size, from one student and one adviser to hundreds of students and several advisers. THJHA staff at the museum provide support and resources that include a semiannual student magazine Tar Heel Junior Historian.

== North Carolina Sports Hall of Fame ==
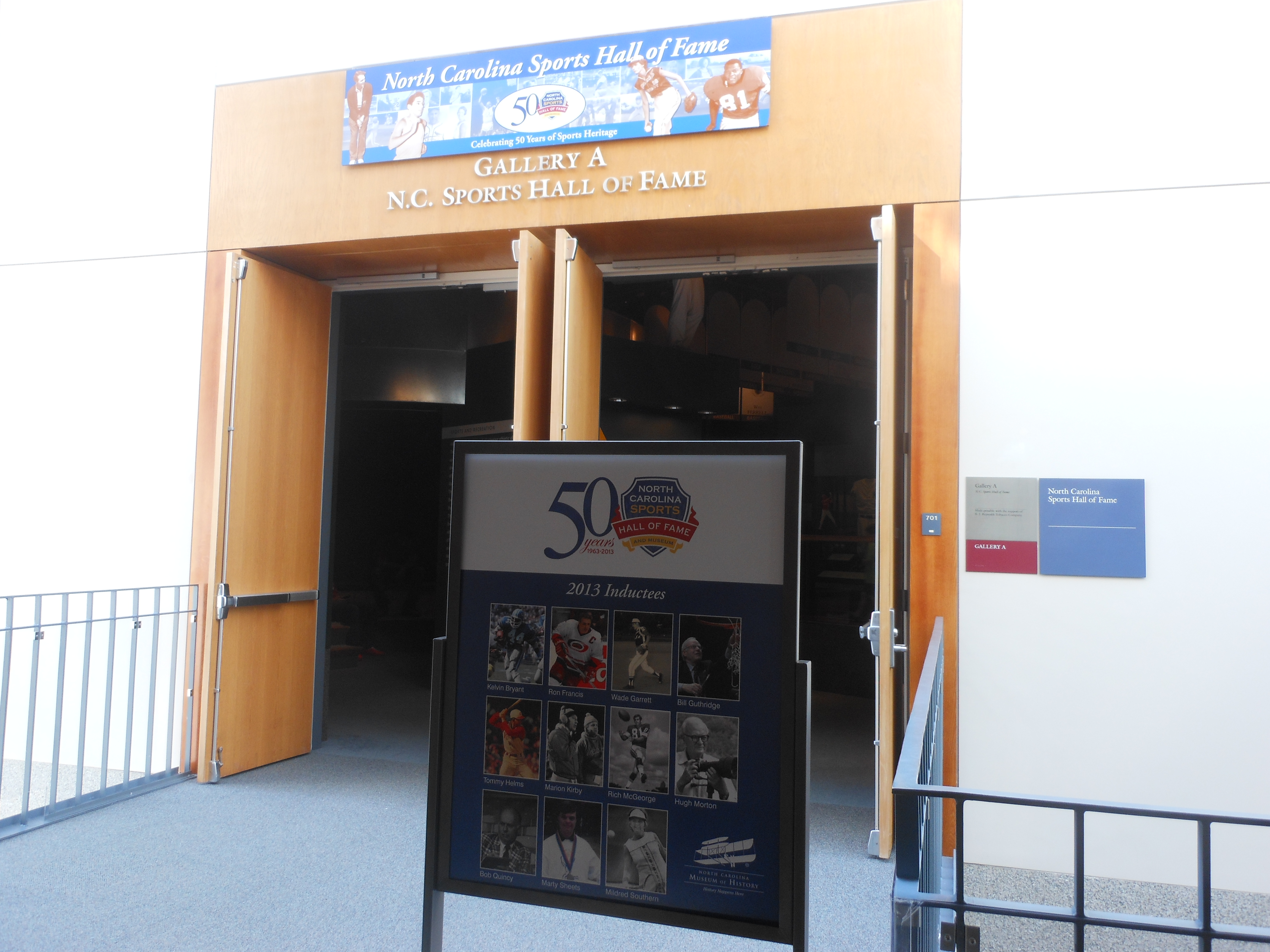
North Carolina Sports Hall of Fame Gallery

The North Carolina Sports Hall of Fame is housed in a 4,000 square feet (370 m^{2}) permanent exhibit gallery on the third floor of the North Carolina Museum of History. The hall of fame was originally established in February 1963, with support from the Charlotte Chamber of Commerce, "celebrates excellence and extraordinary achievement in athletics [and] commemorates and memorializes exceptional accomplishments in or connected with the world of sports who have brought recognition and esteem to themselves and to the State of North Carolina." The hall inducted its first class of five members in December of that year and, as of 2010, numbered 274 members.

Since the beginning, inductees, who are elected annually, have donated mementos of their sports careers to the hall of fame. In 1969 officials at the Charlotte Coliseum agreed to display these objects in the corridor of the building, hoping to eventually expand the building to include a room dedicated to the hall. The expansion never occurred, however, and in 1981 the objects were moved to the North Carolina Museum of History, where a dedicated gallery was a part of the new museum's plans.

Mementos on display in the gallery include Richard Petty's race car, Dale Earnhardt's fire suit, North Carolina State University basketball coach Jim Valvano's warm-up suit, Arnold Palmer's Ryder Cup golf bag, Meadowlark Lemon's Harlem Globetrotters basketball uniform, North Carolina State University coach Kay Yow's Olympic team basketball, Carolina Hurricanes captain Rod Brind'Amour's game-worn jersey from Game 7 of the 2006 Stanley Cup Finals and University of North Carolina at Chapel Hill football star Charlie "Choo Choo" Justice's jersey.

Basketball great and Wilmington, North Carolina, native Michael Jordan was conspicuously missing from the hall for many years because, even though he had been selected for induction, he had been "unable" to attend the required induction banquet. In 2010, it was announced that Jordan would be formally inducted to the hall. Uniquely, his ceremony was held at halftime of a Charlotte Bobcats game (Jordan owned the NBA team at the time).

== North Carolina Museum of History Associates ==
The North Carolina Museum of History Associates is the membership arm of the North Carolina Museum of History. The group assists the museum primarily with daily expenses related to acquisitions, publications, and promotional efforts. As state government funds have been reduced over recent years, the importance of member support has grown—in fact, membership revenue is now central to the museum's effort to maintain free programming.

In addition to the museum in Raleigh, the Museum of History Associates provide funding and support services to the regional museums of the Division of State History Museums:

- Graveyard of the Atlantic Museum, Hatteras
- Museum of the Albemarle, Elizabeth City
- Museum of the Cape Fear Historical Complex, Fayetteville
- Mountain Gateway Museum and Heritage Center, Old Fort
- North Carolina Maritime Museum, locations in Beaufort and Southport

The Associates also work throughout the state to raise awareness of the museum and its efforts by hosting Museum Days events occasionally in different locations.

== North Carolina Museum of History Foundation ==
The North Carolina Museum of History Foundation raises funds that enable the Museum of History and the Division of State History Museums (an agency of the Office of Archives and History, North Carolina Department of Cultural Resources) to lead the state in preserving and interpreting the history and culture of the Tar Heel State. The Foundation primarily collects and distributes funds for ongoing efforts related to

- exhibitions,
- educational programming,
- artifact acquisition, and
- object conservation.

The Foundation also supports needed capital improvements and directs funds toward building an endowment for future generations. The Foundation is a 501(c)(3) charitable organization; contributions are tax deductible to the fullest extent allowed by law.

== Gallery ==
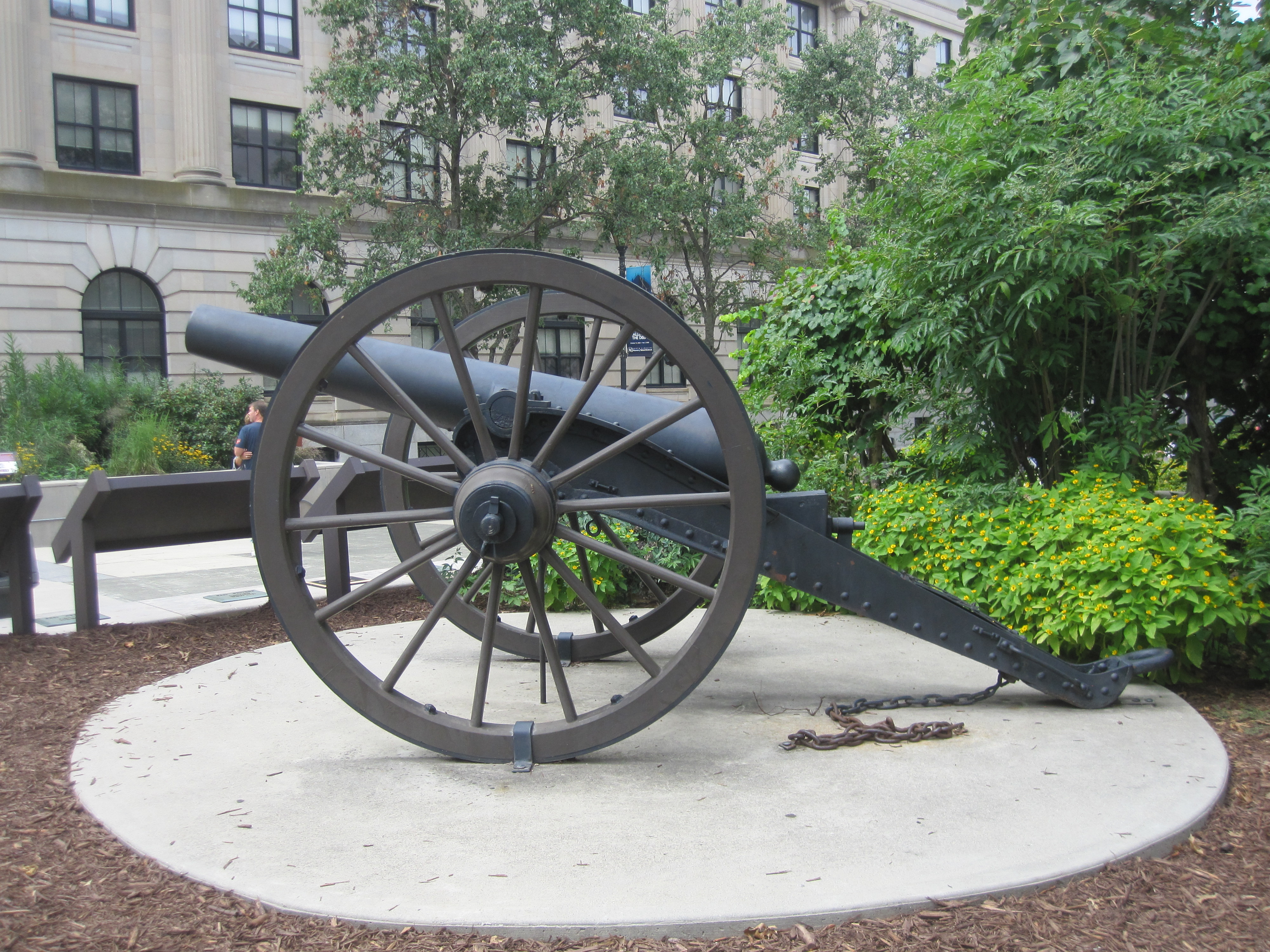
Civil war-era cannon in front of the museum

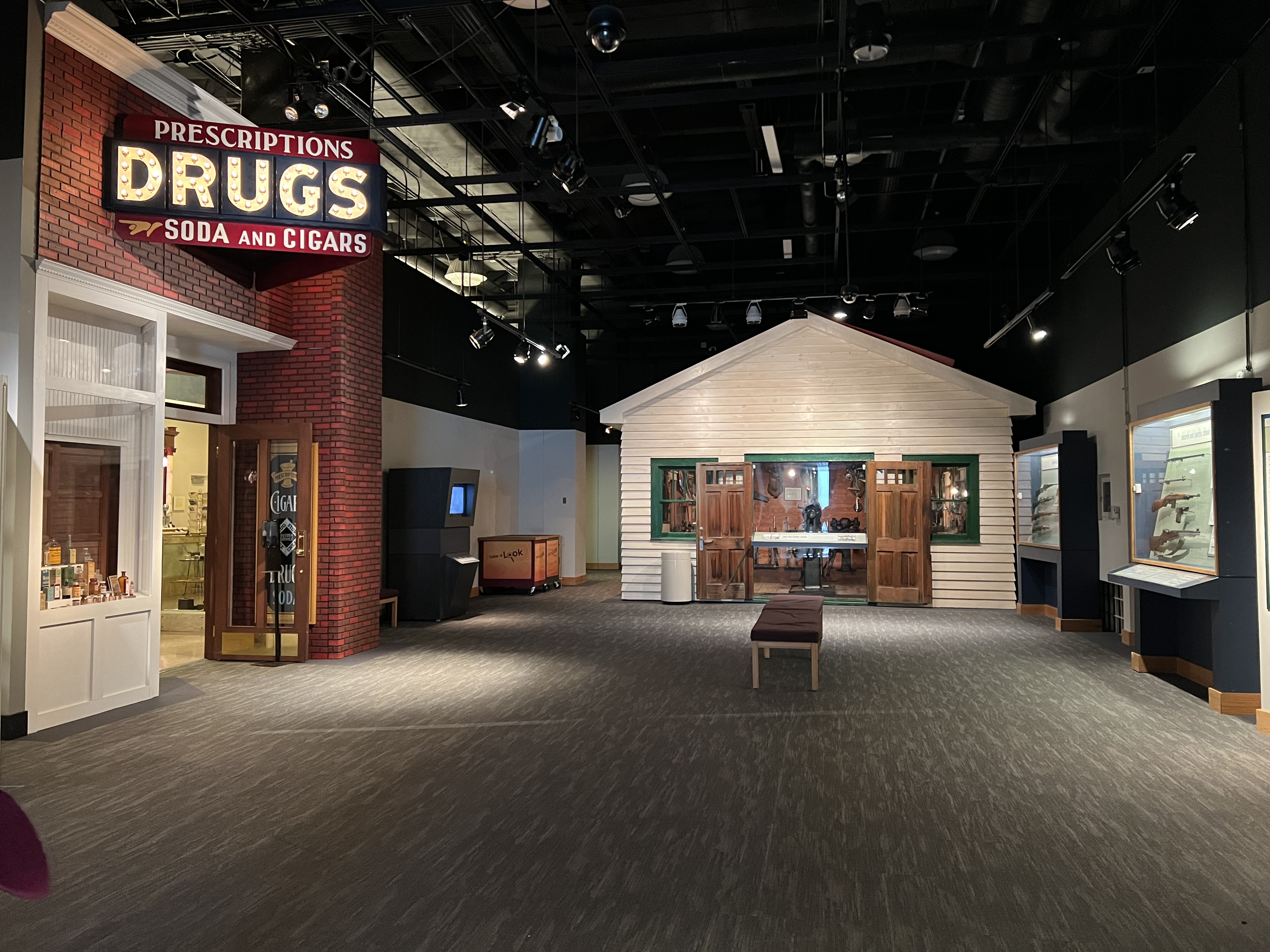
Example of an exhibit: Recreation of a 1920s drugstore

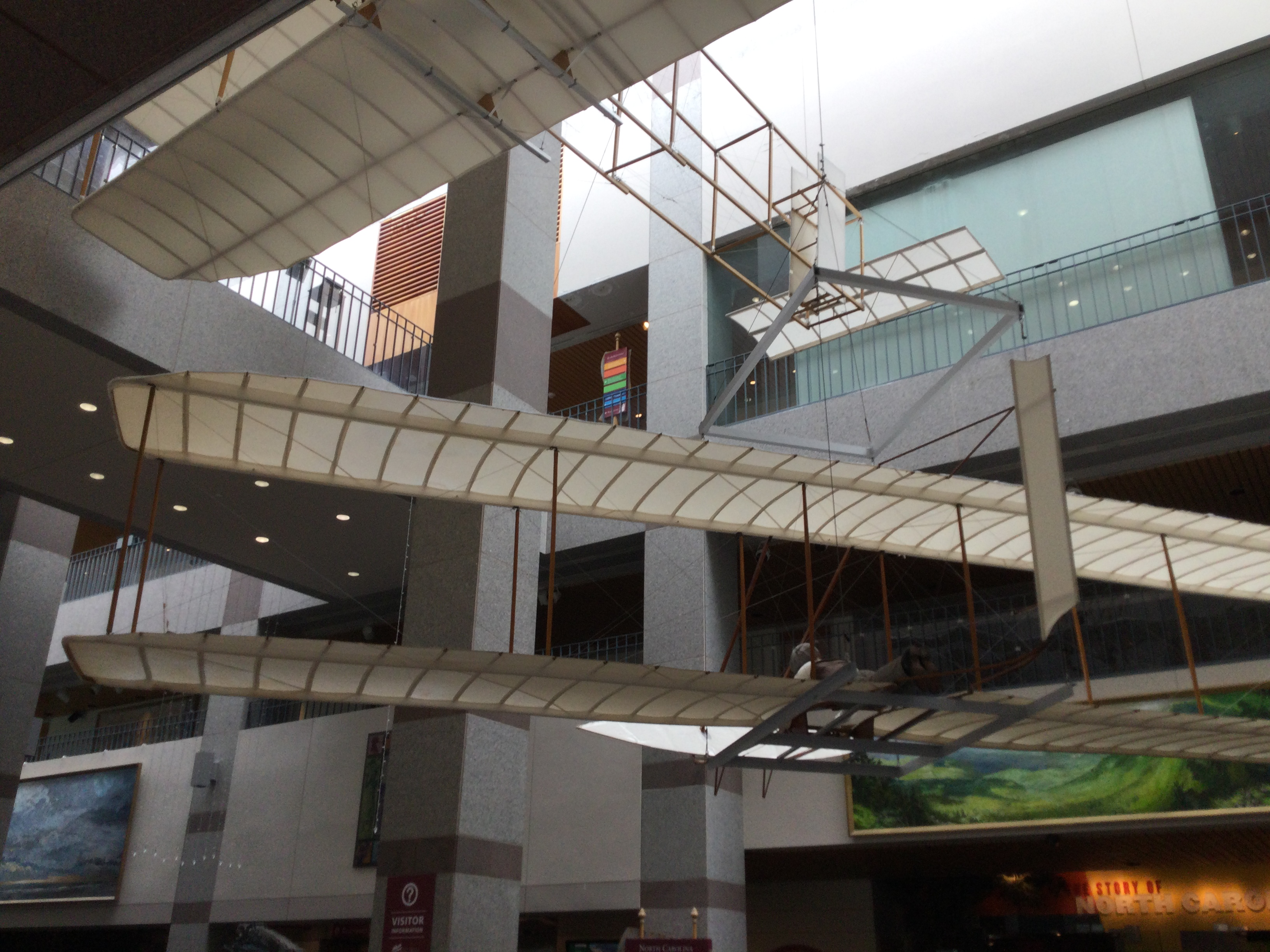
Model of a 1902 Wright Glider in the museum's entrance
