= C/1991 Y1 (Zanotta–Brewington) =

Non-periodic comet

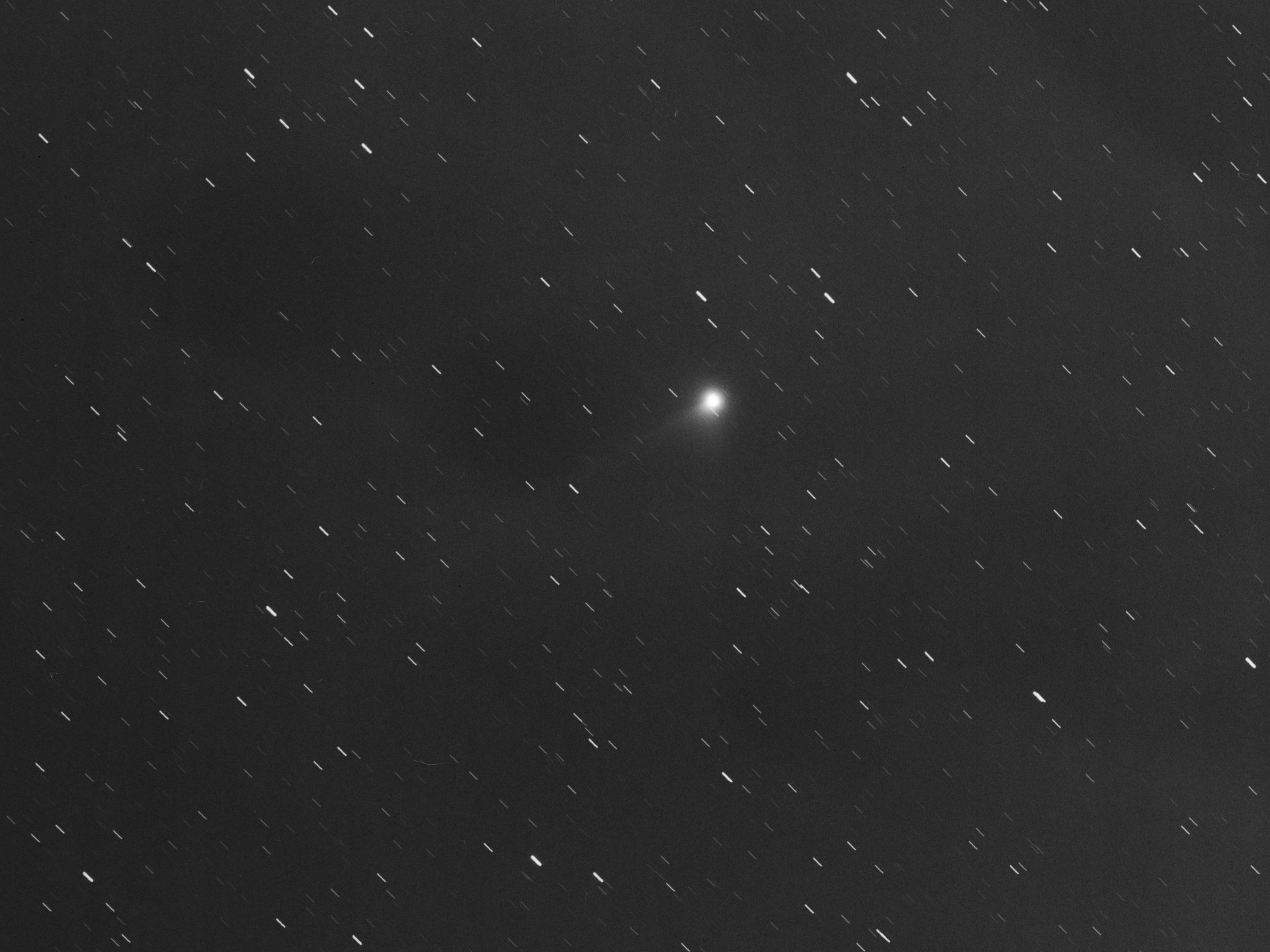
- Comet Zanotta–Brewington photographed from the Heidelberg Observatory on 24 January 1992.

Discovery
- Discovered by: Mauro V. Zanotta; Howard J. Brewington
- Discovery site: Milan, Italy; Cloudcroft, USA
- Discovery date: 23–24 December 1991

Designations
- Alternative designations: 1992 III, 1991g1

Orbital characteristics
- Epoch: 10 January 1992 (JD 2448631.5)
- Observation arc: 130 days
- Number of observations: 266
- Aphelion: ~1,790 AU (outbound)
- Perihelion: 0.644 AU
- Semi-major axis: ~900 AU (outbound)
- Eccentricity: 1.00005 (inbound); 0.99929 (outbound)
- Orbital period: ~26,800 years (outbound)
- Inclination: 50.028°
- Longitude of ascending node: 254.91°
- Argument of periapsis: 197.87°
- Mean anomaly: –1.791°
- Last perihelion: 31 January 1992
- Earth MOID: 0.319 AU
- Jupiter MOID: 1.670 AU

Physical characteristics
- Comet total magnitude (M1): 10.2
- Comet nuclear magnitude (M2): 17.0
- Apparent magnitude: 7.3 (1992 apparition)

Comet Zanotta–Brewington, formally designated as C/1991 Y1, is a non-periodic comet that was observed telescopically between December 1991 and May 1992. It was discovered independently by both astronomers, Mauro V. Zanotta and Howard J. Brewington.

== Physical characteristics ==
Photometric studies conducted at the La Silla Observatory revealed that the comet has a relatively high gas production rate (in comparison to 4P/Faye) at 110 × 10^{21} molec s^{−1}/cm^{−1} during perihelion, which decreased with cyanogen activity by March 1992.

Zanotta–Brewington's production rate ratio was compared to that of C/1991 X2 (Mueller) while both comets were around 0.64–0.72 AU (96–108 million km) from the Sun using CCD spectroscopy. While their NH_{2}/H_{2}O ratios were identical, Zannota–Brewington's CN/H_{2}O ratio is found to be half as much as what was observed at Mueller.

== Orbit ==
In September 1993, Brian G. Marsden calculated an orbit that spans the comet's entire observation arc (130 days). He noted that the comet was weakly hyperbolic during its inbound trajectory, indicating it was a dynamically new comet originating from the Oort cloud. Gravitational perturbations of the giant planets has reduced the comet's relative velocity enough to attain a highly eccentric orbit that lasts for roughly 27,000 years during its outbound trajectory.

== See also ==
- 97P/Metcalf–Brewington
- C/1989 W1 (Aarseth–Brewington)
