= North Carolina Land and Water Fund =

Fund to prevent and clean up water pollution

North Carolina Land and Water Fund (NCLWF) was created by the North Carolina General Assembly in 1996 as the 'Clean Water Management Trust Fund'. The fund is an independent non-regulatory agency housed in the Division of Land and Water Stewardship in the North Carolina Department of Natural and Cultural Resources. The special revenue fund was created "to clean up pollution in the State's surface waters and to protect and conserve those waters that are not yet polluted. The intent of the fund is "to focus on the cleanup and prevention of pollution of the State's surface waters, the establishment of a network of riparian buffers and greenways, and the preservation of property for establishing clean water supplies, the General Assembly believes that the results of these efforts will also be beneficial to wildlife and marine fisheries habitats." NCLWF issues grants to a variety of entities including local governments, state agencies and nonprofit corporations "whose primary purpose is the conservation, preservation, and restoration of our State's environmental and natural resources".

== Enabling legislation and purpose ==
The fund is authorized under North Carolina general statute Article 2; Part 41 §143B-135.234:

(a) Fund Established. – The Clean Water Management Trust Fund is established as a special revenue fund to be administered by the Department of Natural and Cultural Resources. The Clean Water Management Trust Fund shall also be known as the "Land and Water Fund." The fund receives revenue from the following sources and may receive revenue from other sources:

1. Annual appropriations.
2. Special registration plates under G.S. 20-81.12.
3. Other special registration plates under G.S. 20-79.7.
4. Hazard mitigation funds from the Federal Emergency Management Agency and other agencies.

Funding purposes are laid out in the legislation, and have evolved over time. Septic and sewer infrastructure are no longer eligible, and natural heritage elements were added as part of the merger with the former NC Natural Heritage Trust Fund. Section C of the enabling legislation lays out the purposes as of June 2021:

(c) Fund Purposes. – Moneys from the fund are appropriated annually to finance projects to clean up or prevent surface water pollution and for land preservation in accordance with this Part. Revenue in the fund may be used for any of the following purposes:

1. To acquire land for riparian buffers for the purposes of providing environmental protection for surface waters and drinking water supplies and establishing a network of riparian greenways for environmental, educational, and recreational uses.
2. To acquire conservation easements or other interests in real property for the purpose of protecting and conserving surface waters and enhancing drinking water supplies, including the development of water supply reservoirs.
3. To coordinate with other public programs involved with lands adjoining water bodies to gain the most public benefit while protecting and improving water quality.
4. To restore previously degraded lands to reestablish their ability to protect water quality.
5. To facilitate planning that targets reductions in surface water pollution.
6. To finance innovative efforts, including pilot projects, to improve stormwater management, to reduce pollutants entering the State's waterways, to improve water quality, and to research alternative solutions to the State's water quality problems.
7. To prevent encroachment, provide buffers, and preserve natural habitats around military installations or military training areas, or for State matching funds of federal initiatives that provide funds to prevent encroachment, provide buffers, and preserve natural habitats around military installations or military training areas.
8. To acquire land that represents the ecological diversity of North Carolina, including natural features such as riverine, montane, coastal, and geologic systems and other natural areas to ensure their preservation and conservation for recreational, scientific, educational, cultural, and aesthetic purposes.
9. To acquire land that contributes to the development of a balanced State program of historic properties.
10. Repealed by Session Laws 2015-241, s. 14.4, effective July 1, 2015.
11. Repealed by Session Laws 2015-241, s. 14.4, effective July 1, 2015.
12. To protect and restore floodplains and wetlands for the purpose of storing water, reducing flooding, improving water quality, providing wildlife and aquatic habitat, and providing recreational opportunities.

== Grant requirements and funding ==
Local governments, state agencies, and nonprofit conservation organizations, such as land trusts and watershed groups, are eligible applicants. Grant applications to the fund are due in early February and are guided by a set of application ranking criteria.

GS § 143B-135.238 lays out general grant requirements and eligible applicants:

(a) Eligible Applicants. - Any of the following are eligible to apply for a grant from the fund for the purpose of protecting and enhancing water quality:

1. A State agency.
2. A local government unit.
3. A nonprofit corporation whose primary purpose is the conservation, preservation, or restoration of our State's cultural, environmental, or natural resources.

(b) Criteria. - The criteria developed by the Trustees under G.S. 143B-135.242 apply to grants made under this Part.

(c) Matching Requirement. - The Board of Trustees shall establish matching requirements for grants awarded under this Part. This requirement may be satisfied by the donation of land to a public or private nonprofit conservation organization as approved by the Board of Trustees. The Board of Trustees may also waive the requirement to match a grant pursuant to guidelines adopted by the Board of Trustees.

(d) Restriction. - No grant shall be awarded under this Part for any of the following purposes:

1. To satisfy compensatory mitigation requirements under 33 USC § 1344 or G.S. 143-214.11.
2. To any project receiving State funds authorized by G.S. 143-215.71 for the nonfederal share of a grant under the Environmental Quality Incentives Program.

(e) Withdrawal. - An award of a grant under this Part is withdrawn if the grant recipient fails to enter into a construction contract for the project within one year after the date of the award, unless the Trustees find that the applicant has good cause for the failure. If the Trustees find good cause for a recipient's failure, the Trustees must set a date by which the recipient must take action or forfeit the grant. (1996, 2nd Ex. Sess., c. 18, s. 27.6(a); 2003-340, s. 1.3; 2005-454, s. 6; 2006-178, s. 1; 2007-185, s. 1; 2014-100, s. 14.8(c); 2015-241, s. 14.30(k1), (r1); 2020-18, s. 12(b).)

The fund receives allocations from two primary sources: annual appropriations from the General Assembly and special registration plates under G.S. 20‑81.12.

== Structure ==
Since a legislative restructuring in 2013, the board of trustees is composed of 9 board members. 3 of which are appointed by the Governor (including the chairman), 3 appointed by the President Pro Tempore of the Senate, and 3 appointed by the Speaker of the House of Representatives.

The board membership as of June 2021 is as follows:

John Wilson (chair)	Acquisition Committee, Executive Committee (chair), Restoration, Innovative Stormwater, and Planning Committee
Ann Browning (Vice-chair)	Acquisition Committee, Executive Committee, Restoration, Innovative Stormwater, and Planning Committee
E. Greer Cawood	Acquisition Committee
Amy Grissom	Acquisition Committee
Judith Kennedy	Restoration, Innovative Stormwater, and Planning Committee
Renee Kumor	Executive Committee, Restoration, Innovative Stormwater, and Planning Committee (chair)
Jason Walser	Acquisition Committee (chair), Executive Committee
Darrel Williams	Restoration, Innovative Stormwater, and Planning Committee
David Womack	Acquisition Committee

Prior to 2013: The board of trustees was a 21-member board which was appointed by state elected officials including the governor of NC who appointed seven members with varying staggered terms, the President Pro Tempore of the Senate appointed seven members with varying staggered terms, and the Speaker of the House of Representatives who also appointed seven members with varying staggered terms.

The qualifications must include knowledge in one of the following areas: acquisition and management of natural areas, conservation and restoration of water quality, wildlife and fisheries habitats and resources, or environmental management.

== Staffing ==
As of May 2021, the fund employs ten individuals including: executive director, deputy director, stewardship program manager, executive assistant, acquisition program manager, acquisition project manager, restoration program manager, infrastructure administrative assistant, two field representatives representing the two geographic areas (western and eastern) of the state. The current executive director is Walter Clark (2017–present). Former executive directors are as follows: Bryan Gossage (2013-2017), Richard Rogers (2009–2007), D.G. Martin (Interim Director) (2007), Bill Holman (2000–2006), and David McNaught (1996-2000).

== Key investment sectors ==
The fund typically makes key investments in NC's four primary economic sectors:

- $74 billion agriculture economy – The fund partnered with the NC Soil and Water Conservation Program to buy out swine farms in floodplain areas assisting farmers to transition to more traditional crop production.
- $28 billion military economy – The fund has assisted military bases with downsizing mandates resulting in the protection of water quality by preventing pending development pressure.
- $17 billion tourism economy – Tourism destinations such as Chimney Rock and Grandfather Mountain were secured through the use of Fund resources.
- $4 billion recreation (fish and wildlife) economy – The fund has restored and protected thousands of acres of wetlands and forestland, protecting fish and wildlife habitat enhancing resources attracting hunters and anglers.

The fund lists funded projects going back to 2013.

== Historic project totals ==
Acquisition projects – 750 projects funded as of 2012 for a total investment of $523,000,000 (fee simple and conservation easements combined)

Donated easement minigrants – 170 projects funded as of 2012 for a total investment of $3,900,000

Stream restoration projects – 175 projects funded as of 2012 for a total investment of $116,000,0000
