= Ward-Hancock House =

House in Beaufort, North Carolina

Coordinates: 34.7279°N 76.6657°W

The Ward-Hancock House was a historic house in Beaufort, North Carolina. The house was destroyed by a fire on January 28, 2025.

== History ==
The house was built in the late 1700s and was first owned by Thomas Ward, who later gifted the property to his granddaughter, Martha Gibbs Ward, following her marriage to Robert Hancock in the 1850s. It was moved to 105 Third Street in the 1900s and was moved to the Gallants Channel Annex in 2010. The house was owned by Mayor John Costlow and his wife, Ginny Costlow, from 1993 until the 2000s, when the Beaufort Women's Club acquired the property. The club later donated the property to the North Carolina Maritime Museum. The house was destroyed by a fire on January 28, 2025.
