= Howard J. Brewington =

American astronomer (born 1952)

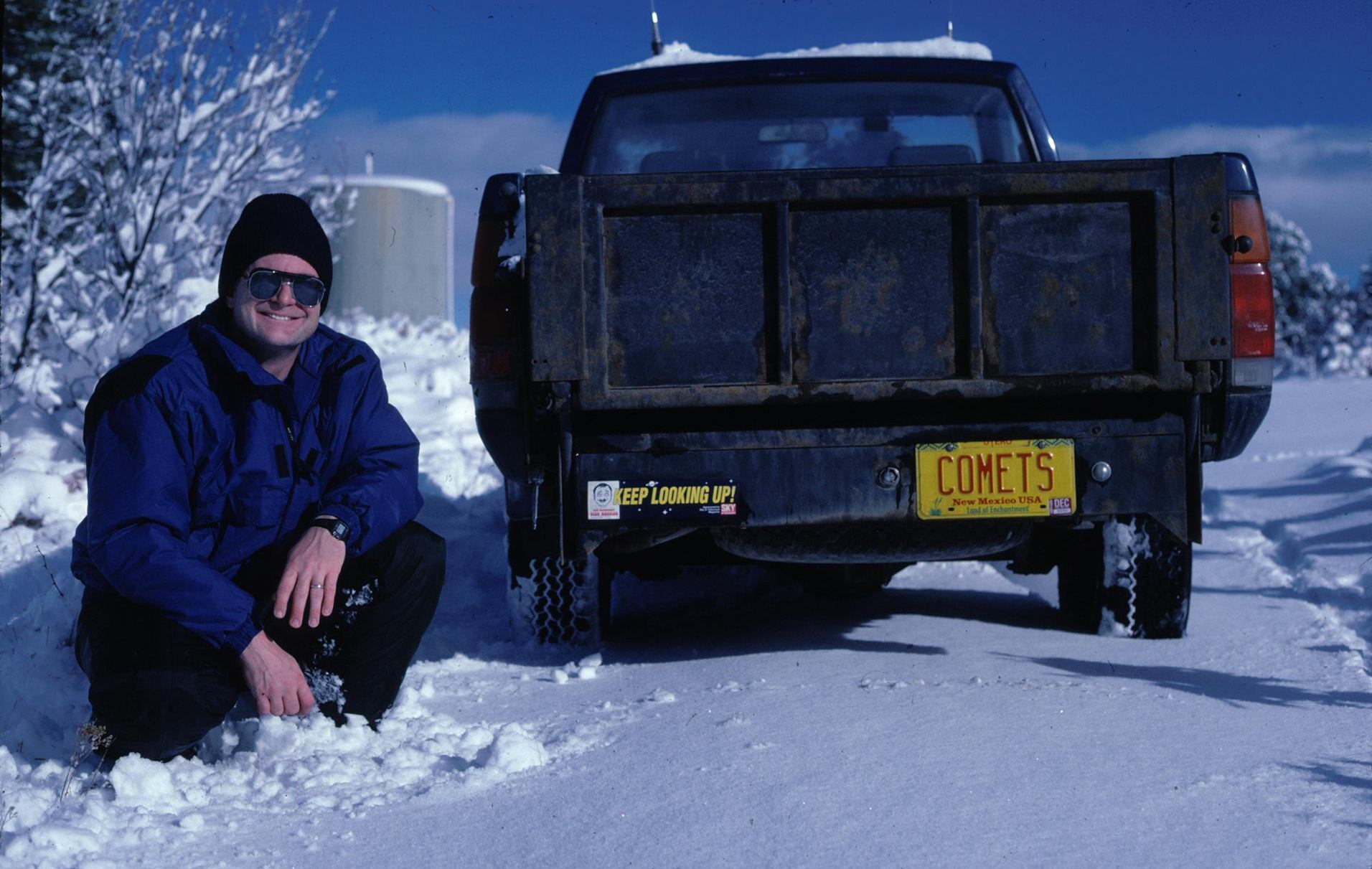
Brewington in Cloudcroft, New Mexico 1995

Comets discovered or co-discovered: Five
C/1989 W1 (Aarseth-Brewington)^{[1]}	November 16, 1989
97P/Metcalf-Brewington^{[2]}	January 7, 1991
C/1991 Y1 (Zanotta-Brewington)^{[3]}	December 23, 1991
154P/Brewington	August 28, 1992
C/1996 N1 (Brewington)	July 3, 1996
1. ^{1} shared with Knut Aarseth, Norway; 2. ^{2} shared with Joel Hastings Metcalf, US; 3. ^{3} shared with Mauro V. Zanotta, Italy

Howard J. Brewington (born December 3, 1952, in South Carolina) is an American comet discoverer and former professional telescope operator of the Sloan Digital Sky Survey.

== Biography ==
As an amateur astronomer, Brewington visually discovered or co-discovered five comets while manually sweeping the night sky with his home-built reflecting telescopes. He specifically designed his telescopes for the task, which included hand-grinding and polishing the 8 and 16-inch primary mirrors himself. Brewington found his first comet from South Carolina in 1989. To improve his chances of additional finds, he and his first wife, Trudy Bland-Brewington, moved to southern New Mexico in the fall of 1990 and built a comet hunting observatory on a mountain ridge east of Cloudcroft. From 1991 to 1996, the relocation paid-off with four more visual discoveries. Two of his New Mexico comets, 97P/Metcalf-Brewington and 154P/Brewington, have short-period orbits of about ten years.

Starting in 1992, NASA-funded robotic telescopes had begun finding comets as part of their Near-Earth Object (NEO) survey. Because of this development, Brewington predicted the end of visual comet discoveries as explained in his article, “The Future Of Comet Hunting,“ which appeared in the summer 1995 issue of CCD Astronomy magazine. A follow-up article by Brewington was published via Sky & Telescope magazine in November 2015, "The Last Visual Comet Hunters," which confirmed his prediction.

Since NASA's automated patrol scopes left few remaining prospects for visual comet hunters, Brewington stopped comet hunting in 1999, moved back to South Carolina, and enrolled at the University of South Carolina in Columbia. He graduated with honors in the summer of 2002 and was hired by year's end as a 2.5-meter telescope operator through the Astronomy Department of New Mexico State University. From 2002 to 2015, he worked at the Apache Point Observatory in Sunspot, New Mexico, as part of the Sloan Digital Sky Survey. During Sloan projects SDSS-I through SDSS-IV, Brewington collected imaging and/or spectral data for projects including First-Phase Operations, Sloan Legacy Survey, SEGUE, Sloan Supernova Survey, APOGEE, BOSS, MARVELS, SEGUE-2, APOGEE-2, eBOSS, and MaNGA.

Brewington, now retired from NMSU, lives in Bastrop, Texas, with his second wife, Maria (a.k.a. Maya) Hamby-Brewington. He is a member of the Austin Astronomical Society and often attends national star parties. Brewington’s most recent astronomical pastime is finding and imaging micrometeorites. In fact, he has found hundreds of these sub-millimeter visitors, which are created as space dust falls through Earth’s atmosphere. Brewington also enjoys amateur radio. He's earned an Amateur Extra Class license, and his call sign is KJ5NJ.

== Awards ==
- 1995, Asteroid (5799) was named "Brewington" in his honor
- 2020, Received the Leslie C. Peltier Award from the Astronomical League for “Comet Discoveries And Other Numerous Contributions To Observational Astronomy.”

== See also ==
- Joel Hastings Metcalf
- Lists of Comets
- Charles Messier
