= Brewington Creek =

- Location within Texas Location within the United States

Physical characteristics
- Source
  - coordinates: 29.9271598°N 99.4214355°W
- Mouth
  - coordinates: 29.8757733°N 99.3489332°W

Brewington Creek is a stream in Bandera County, Texas, in the United States.

Brewington Creek was named in the 1850s for a pioneer settler.

== See also ==
- List of rivers of Texas
