= 393 Lampetia =

Main-belt asteroid

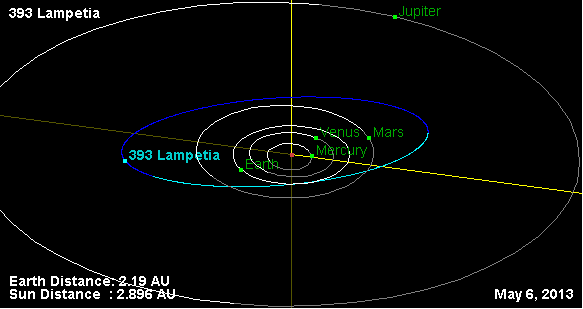
- Orbital diagram

Discovery
- Discovered by: Max Wolf
- Discovery date: 4 November 1894

Designations
- Pronunciation: /læmˈpiːʃiə/
- Named after: Lampetia
- Alternative designations: 1894 BG
- Minor planet category: Main belt
- Symbol: Astrological symbol for Lampetia

Orbital characteristics
- Epoch 31 July 2016 (JD 2457600.5)
- Uncertainty parameter 0
- Observation arc: 112.56 yr (41112 d)
- Aphelion: 3.6980 AU (553.21 Gm)
- Perihelion: 1.8568 AU (277.77 Gm)
- Semi-major axis: 2.7774 AU (415.49 Gm)
- Eccentricity: 0.33146
- Orbital period (sidereal): 4.63 yr (1690.6 d) (4.63 yr)
- Mean anomaly: 173.245°
- Mean motion: 0° 12^{m} 46.584^{s} / day
- Inclination: 14.879°
- Longitude of ascending node: 212.460°
- Time of perihelion: 2023-Aug-15
- Argument of perihelion: 90.824°

Physical characteristics
- Dimensions: 96.89±31.4 km
- Mass: (1.62±0.45)×10^{18} kg (Note: Calculated from its standard gravitational parameter GM = 0.108±0.030 km^{3}/s^{2}.)
- Mean density: 1.98 g/cm^{3} (Note: Assuming a diameter of 116 km.)
- Synodic rotation period: 38.7 h (1.61 d)
- Geometric albedo: 0.0829±0.099
- Absolute magnitude (H): 8.39

393 Lampetia is a fairly large main belt asteroid that was discovered by German astronomer Max Wolf on 4 November 1894 in Heidelberg. It has an unusually low rotation rate, with a period estimated at 38.7 hours and a brightness variation of 0.14 in magnitude.

In 2000, the asteroid was detected by radar from the Arecibo Observatory at a distance of 0.98 AU. The resulting data yielded an effective diameter of 125 ± 20 km.

It comes to opposition at apparent magnitude 10.5 on 6 July 2023 and then perihelion on 15 August 2023.
