= Pamela Brewington Cashwell =

American politician

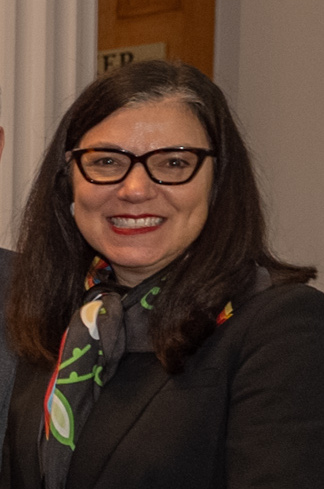
- Cashwell in 2025

North Carolina Secretary of Natural and Cultural Resources
- Incumbent
- Assumed office January 3, 2025
- Governor: Josh Stein
- Preceded by: D. Reid Wilson

North Carolina Secretary of Administration
- In office 2021–2025
- Governor: Roy Cooper
- Preceded by: Machelle Sanders
- Succeeded by: Gabe Esparza

Personal details
- Born: Pamela Brewington Fayetteville, North Carolina, U.S.
- Party: Democratic
- Spouse: David Cashwell
- Children: 2
- Education: University of North Carolina at Chapel Hill (BS, JD)
- Occupation: Lawyer

Pamela Brewington Cashwell is an American lawyer and politician. She was appointed as Secretary of the North Carolina Department of Administration in 2021 by Governor Roy Cooper, becoming the first Native American woman to head a North Carolina Cabinet. She was appointed as Secretary of the North Carolina Department of Natural and Cultural Resources by Governor Josh Stein in 2025.

== Early life and education ==
Cashwell grew up in Fayetteville, North Carolina and descends from the Coharie and Lumbee tribes. Her mother, Gertie Goins Brewington, owned a beauty salon and dress shop and worked for the North Carolina Commission of Indian Affairs. Her father, Arthur Samuel Brewington, owned a trucking business. Cashwell was a fancy dancer in her youth, competing throughout high school and in college. She designed, sewed, and beaded her own regalia for the dances. She spent summers picking cucumbers and working in the tobacco fields on her grandmother's farm in Sampson County.

Cashwell graduated from Pine Forest High School in 1985. She earned a bachelor's degree in economics from the University of North Carolina at Chapel Hill in 1989 and a Juris Doctor from the University of North Carolina School of Law in 1992. While a student at Carolina, Cashwell was a member of the Carolina Indian Circle and helped organize the first annual powwow on Ehringhaus Field.

== Career ==
Cashwell clerked for Judge James Andrew Wynn on the North Carolina Court of Appeals before moving to Washington, D.C. to work for the United States Department of Agriculture as part of the first Clinton administration. She also worked for the White House Counsel's office and the United States Department of Justice, eventually landing a job as a trial lawyer with the department's Civil Rights Division in the Office of Justice Programs. She then went on to work as an attorney in the United States District Court for the Eastern District of Virginia.

She was appointed as a senior policy advisor and chief deputy secretary for Professional Standards, Policy, and Planning at the North Carolina Department of Public Safety by Governor Roy Cooper in 2017. She also served as assistant director of the North Carolina State Ethics Commission.

In 2021, Cashwell was appointed as secretary of the North Carolina Department of Administration by Governor Cooper, becoming the first Native American woman to serve as head of a North Carolina Cabinet.

On June 19, 2023, she was named a Legal Legend of Color honoree by the North Carolina Bar Association. She served on the UNC Board of Visitors, the Carolina Indian Circle Board, the Carolina Women's Leadership Council, and the UNC Alumni Committee for Racial and Ethnic Diversity.

In 2025, she was appointed by Governor Josh Stein to serve as the secretary of the North Carolina Department of Natural and Cultural Resources. She took the oath of office on January 3, 2025, administered by North Carolina Supreme Court Justice Anita Earls during a ceremony at the North Carolina Museum of Art in Raleigh. As secretary of culture, she visited the River Arts District in Asheville following the districts' decimation by Hurricane Helene to meet with artists, leaders of arts organizations, and representatives from the arts council to hear about the recovery process and the community's needs. She helped with restoration and clean-up efforts at Marshall High Studios on Blannahassett Island in Marshall and attended the reopening of Chimney Rock State Park.

== Personal life ==
Cashwell is married to David Cashwell and has two sons. They live in Wake County.

== See also ==
- List of Native American politicians
- Native American women in politics
