= North Carolina Department of Administration =

North Carolina Department of Administration (NCDOA)
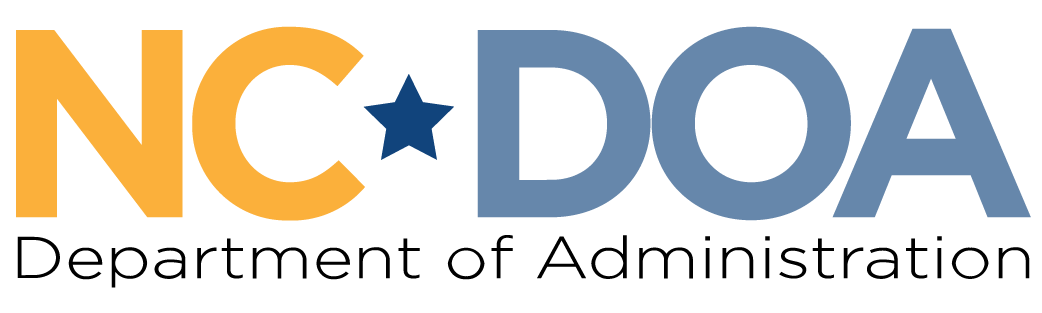
- Logo of the North Carolina Department of Administration

Agency overview
- Formed: 1957
- Headquarters: Albemarle Building Raleigh, North Carolina
- Agency executive: Gabe Esparza; Secretary of Administration
- Website: www.doa.nc.gov

The North Carolina Department of Administration (NCDOA) was established in 1957 and authorized by North Carolina General Statute 143B, Article 9, Paragraph 143B-366. The department provides business management to the North Carolina government. NCDOA is one of the ten cabinet level agencies. It oversees government operations including facilities construction, purchasing goods, contracting for services, and managing property.

== History ==
In early 1957, a Commission on the Reorganization of State Government recommended to the North Carolina General Assembly that various state agencies concerned with personnel and research management in the state's bureaucracy be combined to form a Department of Administration to allow for streamlined and stronger executive control over these functions. Later that year, the General Assembly created the Department of Administration by consolidating the State Budget Bureau and the Division of Purchase and Contract. The two agencies were transferred to the new department in their entirety and made divisions of it, though allowance was made for the department to create additional divisions. The General Assembly also created new responsibilities for the department to administer, including the management of most state real estate and office space, the study of other state agencies' executive structure, the training of other state agencies on the development of capital improvement plans, and the study of broad topics of economic importance to the state. The new agency was placed under the control of a director appointed by and responsible to the governor.

Owing to its roles in planning and planning matters, the Department of Administration developed information and computing operations in its early years. In 1971, the General Assembly passed the Executive Organization Act which classified the department as one of 19 principle departments of state government and classified its leader as a secretary. In 1979, the Budget Bureau was removed the agency's purview and incorporated directly into the office of the governor.

== Services ==
NCDOA houses miscellaneous state government programs. NCDOA is overseeing the state's motor fleet Zero Emissions Vehicle initiative, established by Governor Roy Cooper in 2019. The department publishes breakdowns of state spending, reporting statistics such as per-pupil educational spending. NCDOA administers public relations for state government, promoting the administration awareness campaigns, such as WalksmartNC pedestrian initiative and the campaign promoting participation in the U.S. census. In 2019, Secretary Machelle Sanders launched the Lady Cardinal Mentorship Program, a summer program that connects female high school students with women in STEM careers in state government.

== Divisions ==
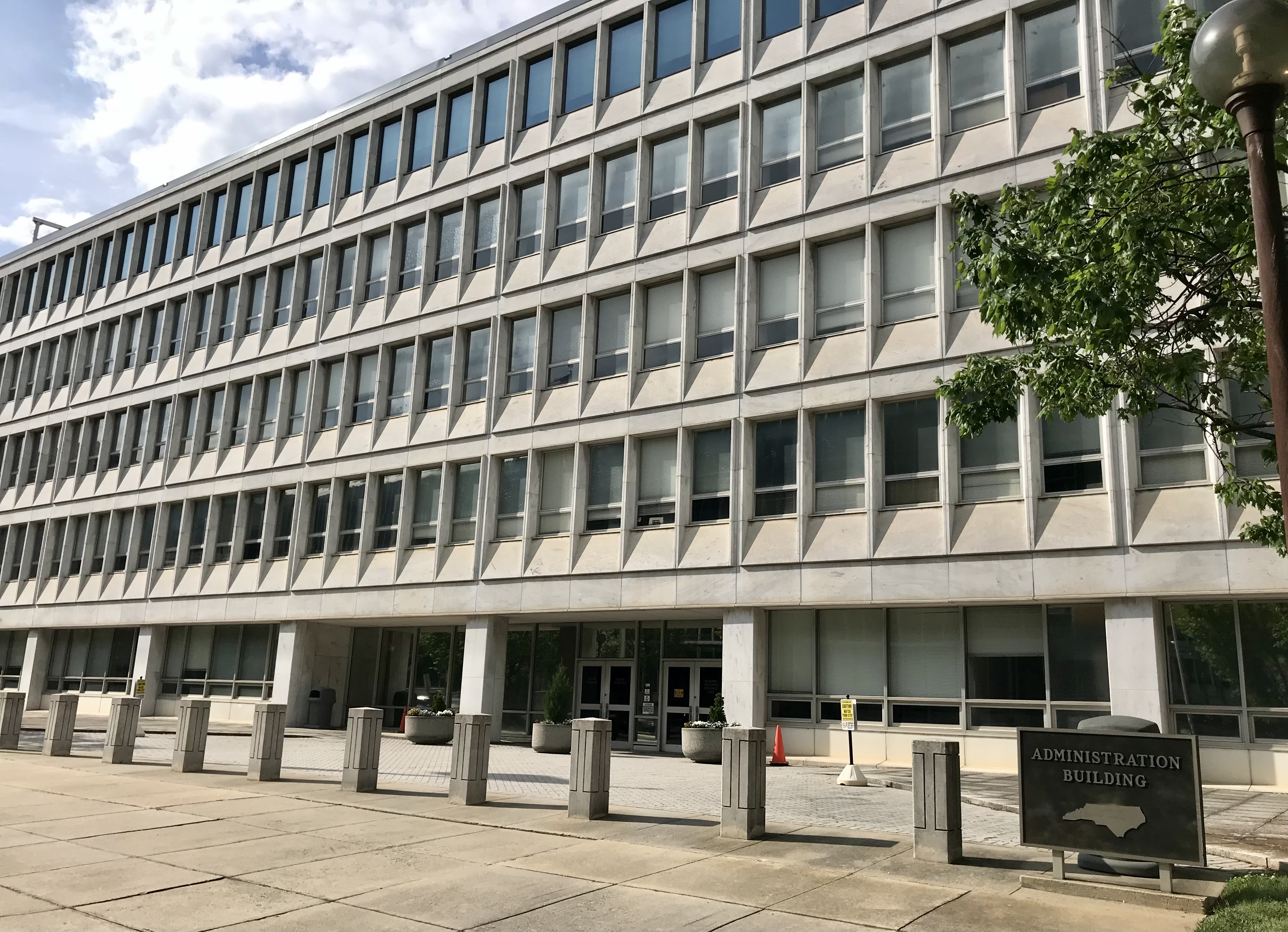
Former North Carolina Department of Administration Building

Current Divisions and Special Programs of the NCDOA include:

- Commission of Indian Affairs
- Council for Women & Youth Involvement
- Division of Non-Public Education
- Division of Purchase & Contract
- Facility Management Division
- Federal Surplus Property Office
- Justice for Sterilization Victims Foundation
- License to Give Trust Fund Commission
- Mail Service Center
- Motor Fleet Management
- State Construction Office
- State Parking Division
- State Property Office
- State Surplus Property Office

== Secretaries ==
The department is headed by a Secretary:

- Gabe Esparza, 2025 – present
- Pamela Brewington Cashwell, 2021 – 2025
- Machelle Sanders, 2017 – 2021
- Kathryn L. Johnston, 2015 – 2017
- William Daughtridge, 2013 – 2015
- Moses Carey Jr., 2010 – 2013
- Britt Cobb, 2006 – 2010
- Gwynn T. Swinson, 2001 – 2006
- Katie G. Dorsett, 1993 – 2001
- James S. Lofton, 1987 – 1993
- Grace J. Rohrer, 1985 – 1987
- Jane S. Patterson, 1981 – 1985
- Joseph W. Grimsley, 1980 – 1981
- Jane S. Patterson (Acting), 1979 – 1980
- Joseph W. Grimsley, 1977 – 1979
- Bruce A. Lentz, 1974 – 1977
- William L. Bondurant, 1973 – 1974
- William L. Turner, 1969 – 1973
- Wayne A. Corpening, 1967 – 1969
- Edward L. Rankin Jr., 1965 – 1967
- Hugh Cannon, 1961 – 1965
- David S. Coltrane, 1960 – 1961
- Paul A. Johnston, 1957 – 1960

== Works cited ==
- Cheney, John L. Jr., ed. (1981). North Carolina Government, 1585-1979: A Narrative and Statistical History (revised ed.). Raleigh: North Carolina Secretary of State. OCLC 1290270510.
- "Report of the Commission on the Reorganization of State Government". Popular Government. Vol. 23, no. 5. UNC Institute of Government. February 1957. pp. 15–19.
- Sanders, John L. (September 1957). "State Government". Popular Government. Vol. 24, no. 1. UNC Institute of Government. pp. 6–13.
- Sawyer, Ann L. (1981). "Fifty Years of North Carolina State Government". Popular Government. Vol. 46, no. 3. UNC Institute of Government. pp. 4–10.
