= North Carolina Maritime Museum =

Group of museums in North Carolina, United States

Coordinates: 34.71759°N 76.66641°W

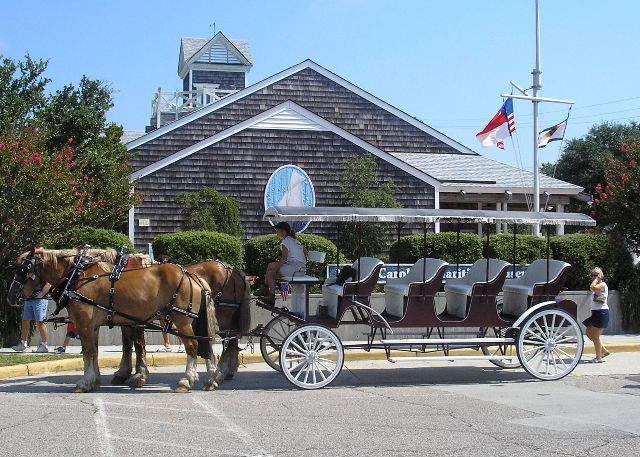
- Location: Beaufort, North Carolina; United States

The North Carolina Maritime Museum is a system of regional museums within the North Carolina Museum of History, which in turn part of the North Carolina Department of Natural and Cultural Resources. There are several branches of the Maritime Museum located in Beaufort, Southport and Hatteras.

== North Carolina Maritime Museum at Beaufort ==
The Beaufort museum focuses on North Carolina's cultural maritime heritage, coastal environment and natural history. Exhibit displays include state shells, fish models, shipwrecks, ship equipment, types of watercraft historically used in North Carolina, whaling, oyster harvesting and commercial and recreational fishing. Another exhibit focuses on the history of the United States Lighthouse Service, United States Life-Saving Service, Revenue Cutter Service, Steamboat Inspection Service, and the United States Coast Guard in North Carolina.

The separate Boat Shed contains a collection of traditional working watercraft.

The Harvey W. Smith Watercraft Center across from the museum is a facility for the repair and conservation of various watercraft. The museum offers boatbuilding courses at the center, which also features the John S. MacCormack Model Shop.

The Ward-Hancock House, which was owned by the museum, was destroyed by a fire on January 28, 2025.

== North Carolina Maritime Museum at Southport ==
The North Carolina Maritime Museum at Southport focuses on the maritime heritage of the Lower Cape Fear area of southeastern North Carolina. Exhibits include ship models, nautical instruments, shipwrecks, pirates, American Civil War history, Fort Johnston (North Carolina), commercial and sport fishing, and hurricanes.

== Graveyard of the Atlantic Museum in Hatteras ==
Named after a nickname for North Carolina's treacherous coast, the Graveyard of the Atlantic Museum in Hatteras tells the story of the more than 2,000 shipwrecks that lie off the Outer Banks.

Exhibits explore some of the region's major wrecks, including those of the USS Monitor, U-85 and USS Huron. Special attention is paid to the tradition of life-saving and the involvement of area residents in the War of 1812, the Civil War, World War I and World War II.

== In media ==
- "Life in a Salt Marsh," a segment of a 1992 episode of the PBS television series Return to the Sea, includes footage of a North Carolina Maritime Museum field trip to a salt marsh.
