= Mountain Gateway Museum and Heritage Center =

History museum in Old Fort, North Carolina

Coordinates: 35.6276°N 82.1808°W

The Mountain Gateway Museum and Heritage Center is a divisional museum of the North Carolina Museum of History that focuses on Southern Appalachian heritage, and the culture and history of western North Carolina. The museum is located in Old Fort, North Carolina, and is part of the Division of State History Museums, Office of Archives and History, an agency of the North Carolina Department of Cultural Resources.

Admission is free, and the museum is open year round. Exhibits include antique tools and household items, photographs, and two historic log cabins that were moved to the site.

Housed in a 1936 WPA stone building and featuring an outdoor amphitheatre, the museum offers many cultural programs, including crafts demonstrations, folk music and concerts, and farming.

== See also ==
- Open-air museum
