= Graveyard of the Atlantic Museum =

Museum in North Carolina

Coordinates: 35.2063°N 75.7040°W

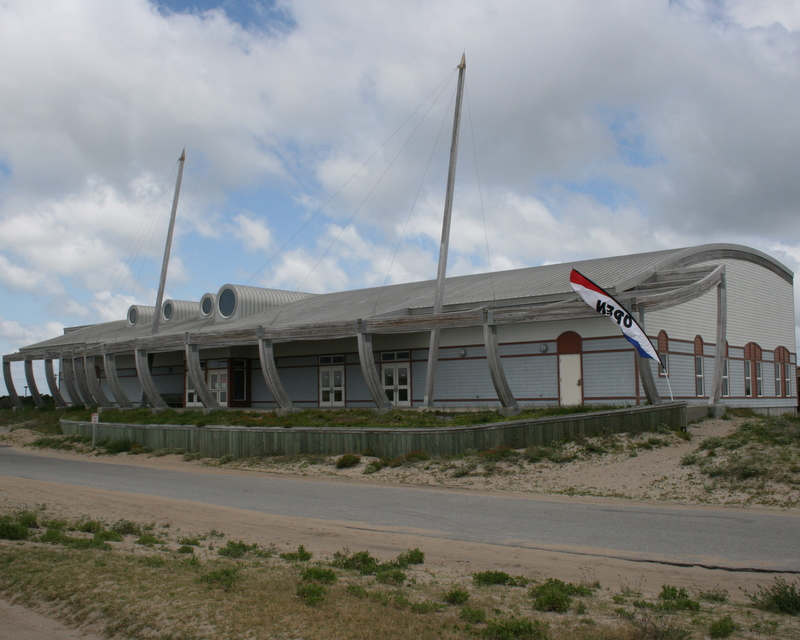
Graveyard of the Atlantic Museum, Hatteras, North Carolina, June 2007

The Graveyard of the Atlantic Museum is a maritime museum that focuses on the maritime history and shipwrecks of the Outer Banks of North Carolina. The museum is located in Hatteras Village, the southernmost community on Hatteras Island, North Carolina, and opened in 2002.

== Exhibits ==
The Graveyard of the Atlantic refers to the coastal region of the Outer Banks that contain the remains of hundreds of ships that were sunk due to war, piracy, or weather. The museum underwent a significant remodeling process starting in late 2022, with Riggs Ward Design contracted to create a comprehensive design plan. The revamped museum reopened in 2024. Notable highlights of the museum include a Monomoy surf boat, a first-order Fresnel lens from the Cape Hatteras Lighthouse, and interactive displays showcasing shipwrecks off the coast. The exhibition covers periods from pre-colonial times to the present, offering a comprehensive journey through the region's history.

The museum is one of three that make up the North Carolina Maritime Museum system, all of which are part of the Division of History Museums under the North Carolina Department of Natural and Cultural Resources.

Admission is free, and the museum is open Monday through Friday 10:00 – 4:00. It is closed on state holidays.

== See also ==
- List of maritime museums in the United States
