= Museum of the Cape Fear Historical Complex =

Coordinates: 35.054512°N 78.892651°W

The Museum of the Cape Fear Historical Complex is a museum about the history and cultural heritage of southern North Carolina. Opened in 1988 and located in Fayetteville, the museum is a regional branch of the North Carolina Museum of History in Raleigh. The complex includes the main history museum, the 1897 Poe House, and Arsenal Park.

Exhibits at the museum include Native Americans, European explorers and settlers, slavery, transportation by plank roads and steamboat, local industries including the textile industry and naval stores industry, the history of Fayetteville during the American Civil War, natural history and folk pottery. An early twentieth century general store with period merchandise is on display.

The 1897 Poe House is a historic house museum that has been furnished for the late Victorian period. Docent-led tours discuss the changes in the era's social, cultural and family history. It was listed on the National Register of Historic Places in 1983.

Arsenal Park, located behind the museum, is a four and a half acre park that features the remains of the Fayetteville Confederate arsenal that was destroyed by Gen. William T. Sherman and his 60,000-man army in March 1865. The museum maintains the park.
