= Meanings of minor-planet names: 6001–7000 =

As minor planet discoveries are confirmed, they are given a permanent number by the IAU's Minor Planet Center (MPC), and the discoverers can then submit names for them, following the IAU's naming conventions. The list below concerns those minor planets in the specified number-range that have received names, and explains the meanings of those names.

Official naming citations of newly named small Solar System bodies are approved and published in a bulletin by IAU's Working Group for Small Bodies Nomenclature (WGSBN). Before May 2021, citations were published in MPC's Minor Planet Circulars for many decades. Recent citations can also be found on the JPL Small-Body Database (SBDB). Until his death in 2016, German astronomer Lutz D. Schmadel compiled these citations into the Dictionary of Minor Planet Names (DMP) and regularly updated the collection.

Based on Paul Herget's The Names of the Minor Planets, Schmadel also researched the unclear origin of numerous asteroids, most of which had been named prior to World War II. This article incorporates text from this source, which is in the public domain: SBDB New namings may only be added to this list below after official publication as the preannouncement of names is condemned. The WGSBN publishes a comprehensive guideline for the naming rules of non-cometary small Solar System bodies.

== 6001–6100 ==
Named minor planet	Provisional	This minor planet was named for...	Ref · Catalog
6001 Thales	1988 CP_{2}	Thales of Miletus (c. 625–547 BC), Ancient Greek philosopher	MPC · 6001
6002 Eetion	1988 RO	Eetion, from Greek mythology. He was the King of Thebe Hypoplakia, father of Andromache, and father-in-law of Hector. Eetion was killed during the raid on Thebe by Achilles.	IAU · 6002
6006 Anaximandros	1989 GB_{4}	Anaximander (c. 610–546 BC), Ancient Greek astronomer	MPC · 6006
6007 Billevans	1990 BE_{2}	Bill Evans (1929–1980), American jazz pianist	JPL · 6007
6009 Yuzuruyoshii	1990 FQ_{1}	Yuzuru Yoshii (born 1951) is a Japanese astronomer and director of the Institute of Astronomy, University of Tokyo. His research interest includes formation and evolution of galaxies, galactic dynamics, and observational cosmology. He is famous for his discovery of the thick-disk component of the Milky Way galaxy.	JPL · 6009
6010 Lyzenga	1990 OE	Gregory Allen Lyzenga, American geophysicist, Satellite Geodesy and Geodynamics Systems Group, Jet Propulsion Laboratory, and, Physics Department, Harvey Mudd College.	MPC · 6010
6011 Tozzi	1990 QU_{5}	Gian Paolo Tozzi (born 1949), Italian astronomer at the Arcetri Observatory near Florence, Italy	MPC · 6011
6012 Williammurdoch	1990 SK_{4}	William Murdoch (1754–1839), a Scottish engineer	JPL · 6012
6013 Andanike	1991 OZ	Andrew (born 1996), David (born 1994), Nicholas (born 1992) and Kevin M. Martinez (born 1989), grandsons of the discoverer Henry E. Holt	JPL · 6013
6014 Chribrenmark	1991 PO_{10}	Christopher (born 1988), Brendan (born 1989) and Mark Moeller (born 1990), grandsons of the discoverer Henry E. Holt	JPL · 6014
6015 Paularego	1991 PR_{10}	Paula Rego (born 1935), Luso-British graphic artist	JPL · 6015
6016 Carnelli	1991 PA_{11}	Ian Carnelli (born 1976), a major contributor in developing asteroid mission concepts at ESA	JPL · 6016
6017 Robertmorehead	1991 PY_{11}	Robert C. Morehead, American astronomy professor at Penn State University.	IAU · 6017
6018 Pierssac	1991 PS_{16}	Piers Sellers (1955–2016), a British-American meteorologist, NASA astronaut and Director of Goddard Space Flight Center's Earth Science Division	JPL · 6018
6019 Telford	1991 RO_{6}	Thomas Telford (1757–1834), a Scottish civil engineer and famed builder of roads, canals, bridges, tunnels and harbors.	JPL · 6019
6020 Miyamoto	1991 SL_{1}	Yukio Miyamoto (born 1921), Japanese astronomer, director of Seiwa Kougen Observatory	MPC · 6020
6022 Jyuro	1992 UB_{4}	Jurō Kobayashi (born 1949), Japanese amateur astronomer and discoverer of minor planets	MPC · 6022
6023 Tsuyashima	1992 UQ_{4}	Takaaki Tsuyashima (born 1949), Japanese astronomer, director of the Kumamoto Kenmin Observatory	MPC · 6023
6024 Ochanomizu	1992 UT_{4}	Ochanomizu, a neighborhood in Tokyo, Japan	MPC · 6024
6025 Naotosato	1992 YA_{3}	Naoto Satō (born 1953), active amateur astronomer and junior high school science teacher.	JPL · 6025
6026 Xenophanes	1993 BA_{8}	Xenophanes (570–475 BC), Ancient Greek philosopher	MPC · 6026
6027 Waratah	1993 SS_{2}	The New South Wales waratah, Telopea speciosissima, is a large shrub endemic to New South Wales, in Australia, and it is the floral emblem of that state.	IAU · 6027
6029 Edithrand	1948 AG	Edith Wirtanen, who discovered this minor planet on a photographic plate taken by her husband Carl A. Wirtanen	MPC · 6029
6030 Zolensky	1981 EG_{36}	Michael Zolensky (born 1955), American meteoriticist and curator of interplanetary dust at NASA's Johnson Space Center, has been at the forefront of understanding the origin of interplanetary dust particles, their relationship to carbonaceous chondrites and the processes that formed them on comets and minor planets (Src)	JPL · 6030
6031 Ryokan	1982 BQ_{4}	Ryōkan (1758–1831), a Zen Buddhist monk who lived as a hermit in Japan	MPC · 6031
6032 Nobel	1983 PY	Alfred Nobel (1833–1896), Swedish chemist, inventor of dynamite, and philanthropist, founder of the Nobel prize	MPC · 6032
6033 Southwood	1984 SQ_{4}	David Southwood, British space scientist and Senior Research Investigator at Imperial College, London.	IAU · 6033
6035 Citlaltépetl	1987 OR	Citlaltépetl, a dormant volcano and the highest mountain (5636 m) in Mexico and lies near to the city of Orizaba.	JPL · 6035
6036 Weinberg	1988 CV_{3}	Steven Weinberg (1933–2021), American physicist and Nobelist	MPC · 6036
6039 Parmenides	1989 RS	Parmenides (born 515 BC), Ancient Greek philosopher	MPC · 6039
6041 Juterkilian	1990 KL	Klas Juter (born 1962), Swedish architect and photographer, and Danuta Kilian (born 1963), Polish artist.	JPL · 6041
6042 Cheshirecat	1990 WW_{2}	The Cheshire Cat, a cat appearing in Lewis Carroll's famous fairy tale Alice in Wonderland. Its unique characteristic is its laughing voice that lingers after the cat fades away.	JPL · 6042
6043 Aurochs	1991 RK_{2}	The aurochs, Bos primigenius †	MPC · 6043
6044 Hammer-Purgstall	1991 RW_{4}	Joseph von Hammer-Purgstall (1774–1856), Austrian orientalist and historian	MPC · 6044
6049 Toda	1991 VP	Kojun Toda (1879–1951) Japanese astronomer	MPC · 6049
6050 Miwablock	1992 AE	Miwa Block (born 1972), application systems analyst at the Lunar and Planetary Laboratory of the University of Arizona and member of the Spacewatch team.	JPL · 6050
6051 Anaximenes	1992 BX_{1}	Anaximenes of Miletus (born 545 BC), Ancient Greek philosopher	MPC · 6051
6052 Junichi	1992 CE_{1}	Junichi Watanabe (born 1960), Japanese astronomer	MPC · 6052
6054 Ghiberti	4019 P-L	Lorenzo Ghiberti (1378–1455), Italian sculptor	MPC · 6054
6055 Brunelleschi	2158 T-3	Filippo Brunelleschi (1377–1446), Florentine sculptor and architect	MPC · 6055
6056 Donatello	2318 T-3	Donatello (c. 1386–1466), Italian sculptor of the Renaissance	MPC · 6056
6057 Robbia	5182 T-3	Luca della Robbia (1400–1482), Italian sculptor. The name also honors several other members of his family.	MPC · 6057
6058 Carlnielsen	1978 VL_{5}	Carl August Nielsen (1865–1931) is widely recognized as a great Danish composer who is especially noted for his six symphonies.	JPL · 6058
6059 Diefenbach	1979 TA	Karl Wilhelm Diefenbach (1851–1913), a German painter and philosopher.	JPL · 6059
6060 Doudleby	1980 DX	Doudleby, a village in southern Bohemia, near České Budějovice in the Czech Republic. It was first mentioned as a site of a Slavonic fortified settlement above the Malše river in 981. The Gothic church of St. Vincent was built on this site. The region of Doudleby is known for its lively traditional folk customs, including carnivals. Name suggested by J. Ticha and M. Tichy.	JPL · 6060
6062 Vespa	1983 JQ	Vespa, an Italian–made scooter. The naming took place in 1996, in commemoration of its 50th anniversary since its launch.	MPC · 6062
6063 Jason	1984 KB	Jason, Greek mythological hero	MPC · 6063
6064 Holašovice	1987 HE_{1}	Holašovice, a village in Bohemia, Czech Republic	MPC · 6064
6065 Chesneau	1987 OC	Olivier Chesneau (1972–2014) was a French astronomer.	JPL · 6065
6066 Hendricks	1987 SZ_{3}	John Hendricks (born 1952), founder of Discovery Communications (Discovery Channel; Learning Channel)	MPC · 6066
6067 Donutil	1990 QR_{11}	Miroslav Donutil, Czech actor.	IAU · 6067
6068 Brandenburg	1990 TJ_{2}	Brandenburg, a federal state of Germany	MPC · 6068
6069 Cevolani	1991 PW_{17}	Giordano Cevolani (born 1945), Italian geophysicist † Archived 2011-05-25 at the Wayback Machine	MPC · 6069
6070 Rheinland	1991 XO_{1}	Rhineland, a region in western Germany along the Rhine River	MPC · 6070
6071 Sakitama	1992 AS_{1}	Sakitama, located in the city of Gyōda and from which Saitama prefecture takes its name, is known for its burial mounds, constructed from clay and rocks between the fourth and seventh centuries.	JPL · 6071
6072 Hooghoudt	1280 T-1	Bernard Hooghoudt (1924–1995), developer of the Dutch radio telescopes	MPC · 6072
6073 Tähtiseuraursa	1939 UB	Tähtiseuraursa is Finnish for Astro Society Ursa. Ursa is a non-profit society of amateur astronomers, founded by Yrjö Väisälä in 1921. Ursa has grown to be one of the largest astronomical societies in Europe, with over 19 000 members in 2021.	IAU · 6073
6074 Bechtereva	1968 QE	Natalia Bekhtereva (1924–2008), was a Russian neurophysiologist, director of the Institute of Experimental Medicine in St. Petersburg for many years and founder of the Institute of the Human Brain of the Russian Academy of Sciences. Bechtereva laid the foundation for basic research into the physiology of healthy and diseased human brains. She discovered the cerebral mechanisms that optimize cognitive processes – the error detector. The theory of the brain's stable pathological state as the adaptation background for many chronic diseases was developed by Bechtereva, opening up new opportunities for their treatment. Name suggested by the Institute of the Human Brain and the Institute of Applied Astronomy.	JPL · 6074
6075 Zajtsev	1976 GH_{2}	Aleksandr Leonidovich Zaitsev (1945–2021), Russian radio engineer and astronomer †	MPC · 6075
6076 Plavec	1980 CR	Miroslav Plavec (1925–2008), Czech astronomer	MPC · 6076
6077 Messner	1980 TM	Reinhold Messner (born 1944), an Italian mountaineer, adventurer and writer	JPL · 6077
6078 Burt	1980 TC_{5}	Burton G. Shoemaker (born 1912), uncle of Eugene M. Shoemaker	MPC · 6078
6079 Gerokurat	1981 DG_{3}	Gero Kurat (1938–2009), Austrian curator of the meteorite collection of the Natural History Museum in Vienna, and president of the Meteoritical Society	MPC · 6079
6080 Lugmair	1981 EY_{26}	Günter Lugmair (1940–2021), German cosmochemist and meteoriticist and director of the Max-Planck-Institut for Chemistry at Mainz	MPC · 6080
6081 Cloutis	1981 EE_{35}	Edward Cloutis (born 1958), Canadian physicist and professor at the University of Winnipeg	MPC · 6081
6082 Timiryazev	1982 UH_{8}	Kliment Timiryazev (1843–1920), a Russian physiologist and botanist, was a member of the Imperial St. Petersburg Academy of Sciences	MPC · 6082
6083 Janeirabloom	1984 SQ_{2}	Jane Ira Bloom (born 1955), an American soprano saxophonist and jazz composer. She is known for her chromatic, lyrical playing and compositions for orchestra, unusual ensembles and dance troupes. Her performances with traditional jazz groups appear on several critically acclaimed recordings. As the first musician in the NASA Art Program, she wrote "Most Distant Galaxy" and "Einstein's Red/Blue Universe", the latter on commission for the American Composers' Orchestra.	JPL · 6083
6084 Bascom	1985 CT	Florence Bascom (1862–1945), the first woman geologist in the United States. She was an expert in crystallography, mineralogy and petrography and worked in the fields of metamorphism and crystallography in their infancy. Bascom was also an educator who trained a generation of young women as professionals at Bryn Mawr, where she founded the geology department. She was the first woman hired by the U.S. Geological Survey and the first woman elected to the Council of the Geological Society of America. Her pioneering work earned her a position among the country's hundred leading geologists in the early twentieth century.	JPL · 6084
6085 Fraethi	1987 SN_{3}	Frede Pedersen, father of one of the discoverers; Frede, an old Danish name meaning peace, comes from the old Nordic name Fraethi.	JPL · 6085
6086 Vrchlický	1987 VU	Jaroslav Vrchlický (1853–1912), born Emil Frída, Czech poet and one of the most prolific of all Czech writers. His works included lyric and epic poetry, plays and Czech translations of major European writers.	JPL · 6086
6087 Lupo	1988 FK	Bob Lupo, Boston-born Arizona restaurateur. Wearing a black hat and a genial smile, Lupo typifies the Western cowboy of today's imagination. Born in Boston, he sought his fortune in the West, becoming a registered farrier and at one time taking part in team roping in Colorado. He owned and managed a fine Western-style eatery, Horseman Lodge and Restaurant, in Flagstaff, Arizona, where he served outstanding seafood (a heritage from Boston), steaks and barbecue to the many renowned visiting scientists and others who have entered his doors.	JPL · 6087
6088 Hoshigakubo	1988 UH	Hoshigakubo, in Niyodo, Kōchi, Japan. The name refers to a section of low ground at Choja, a mountainous place in the western part of Kochi prefecture. Legend has it that a meteorite fell there in olden times. Now there is a pond 20 meters across.	JPL · 6088
6089 Izumi	1989 AF_{1}	Izumi-ku, Sendai, a ward in the northern part of the city of Sendai, Japan	MPC · 6089
6090 Aulis	1989 DJ	Aulis was the port in Boetia where the Greek fleet gathered to set sail for Troy and where Iphigenia was sacrificed by Agamemnon.	IAU · 6090
6091 Mitsuru	1990 DA_{1}	Mitsuru Soma (born 1954), Japanese astronomer	MPC · 6091
6092 Johnmason	1990 MN	John W. Mason (born 1954) has contributed to research on comets and meteors and to the popularization of astronomy. He was president of the British Astronomical Association during 1993–1995.	JPL · 6092
6093 Makoto	1990 QP_{5}	Makoto Yoshikawa (born 1962), Japanese astronomer	MPC · 6093
6094 Hisako	1990 VQ_{1}	Hisako Hioki (born 1929), the mother of the discoverer and an expert seamstress.	JPL · 6094
6097 Koishikawa	1991 UK_{2}	Masahiro Koishikawa (born 1952), a Japanese astronomer, staff member of the Sendai Astronomical Observatory and a discoverer of minor planets	MPC · 6097
6098 Mutojunkyu	1991 UW_{3}	Junkyu Muto (born 1950) is famous worldwide as a Japanese sculptor and painter living in Rome. His series of Kazenowa ("circle wind") sculptures is particularly well known, and in 2000 one of them was installed permanently at the papal villa in Castel Gandolfo as its first abstract sculpture as a monument to world peace	JPL · 6098
6099 Saarland	1991 UH_{4}	Saarland, a German state	MPC · 6099
6100 Kunitomoikkansai	1991 VK_{4}	Ikkansai Kunitomo (1778–1840) Japanese amateur astronomer, observer of the Sun, Moon and planets, and builder several Gregorian reflecting telescopes from his own design	JPL · 6100

== 6101–6200 ==
back to top

Named minor planet	Provisional	This minor planet was named for...	Ref · Catalog
6101 Tomoki	1993 EG	Tomoki Nakamura (born 1966), an associate professor of earth and planetary sciences at Kyushu University, Japan, who specializes in research on primitive solar system materials, most recently leading to the discovery of high-temperature chondrule-like materials in the stardust samples	JPL · 6101
6102 Visby	1993 FQ_{25}	The city of Visby on the island of Gotland, Sweden	MPC · 6102
6104 Takao	1993 HZ	Takao Saito (born 1930), Japanese astrogeophysicist at Tohoku University, Japan	MPC · 6104
6105 Verrocchio	4580 P-L	Andrea del Verrocchio (1435–1488), Florentine sculptor	MPC · 6105
6106 Stoss	6564 P-L	Veit Stoss (c. 1450–1533), German sculptor and wood-carver	MPC · 6106
6107 Osterbrock	1948 AF	Donald Edward Osterbrock (1924–2007), American astrophysicist	MPC · 6107
6108 Glebov	1971 QN	Igor' Alekseevich Glebov (born 1914), scientist in the field of electrical engineering and power engineering, since 1975 director of the Science Research Institute of Electric Machine Engineering in St. Petersburg. Glebov is renowned for his work in control systems for power turbogenerators and his application of superconductivity in electric machine engineering.	JPL · 6108
6109 Balseiro	1975 QC	José Antonio Balseiro (1919–1962), Argentine nuclear physicist	JPL · 6109
6110 Kazak	1978 NQ_{1}	Yurij Ivanovich Kazak (born 1949), surgeon at Bakhchisaraj district hospital, treated many staff members of the Crimean Astrophysical Observatory. A skilled and kind doctor, he is always ready to help people	JPL · 6110
6111 Davemckay	1979 SP_{13}	David S. McKay (1936–2013), American lunar geologist and meteoriticist; Chief Scientist for astrobiology at the Johnson Space Center.	MPC · 6111
6112 Ludolfschultz	1981 DB_{1}	Ludolf Schultz (born 1937), German cosmochemist and meteoriticist; professor at Johannes Gutenberg University of Mainz	MPC · 6112
6113 Tsap	1982 SX_{5}	Teodor Teodorovich Tsap (born 1930) and his son Yurij Teodorovich Tsap (born 1966) are astronomers at the Crimean Astrophysical Observatory. They have made a significant contribution to observations and theory of various solar phenomena. Teodor Tsap, with coauthors, discovered oscillations in the sun with a period of 160 min	JPL · 6113
6114 Dalla-Degregori	1984 HS_{1}	Lucio Dalla (1943–2012) and Francesco De Gregori (born 1951), two popular Italian singers and songwriters	JPL · 6114
6115 Martinduncan	1984 SR_{2}	Martin J. Duncan (born 1950), Canadian astronomer at Queen's University, Kingston, Ontario	MPC · 6115
6116 Still	1984 UB_{3}	William Grant Still (1895–1978), American composer	MPC · 6116
6117 Brevardastro	1985 CZ_{1}	The Brevard Astronomical Society, a very active amateur astronomy community in Brevard County, Florida, where the Kennedy Space Center, Cape Canaveral is located	JPL · 6117
6118 Mayuboshi	1986 QX_{3}	There is a Japanese poem whose subject is Mount Bizan in the Manyosyu, an anthology of the Nara Era. Mt. Bizan is a small mountain that looks like an eyebrow, and is one of the symbols of Tokushima. This whimsical name uses the character for eyebrow, "mayu", combined with "boshi" (star).	JPL · 6118
6119 Hjorth	1986 XH	Jens Hjorth, Danish astrophysicist at University of Copenhagen	MPC · 6119
6120 Anhalt	1987 QR	The Principality of Anhalt, a former State of the Holy Roman Empire, located in Central Germany	MPC · 6120
6121 Plachinda	1987 RU_{3}	Sergej Ivanovich Plachinda (born 1951), astronomer at Crimea–Nauchnij has contributed to investigations on the global magnetic fields of stars of different types. His wife, Nelly Ivanovna Merkulova (born 1949), is a well-known investigator of variability in Seyfert galaxies	JPL · 6121
6122 Henrard	1987 SW_{1}	Jacques Henrard (born 1940), professor of mathematics at the University of Namur in Belgium	MPC · 6122
6123 Aristoteles	1987 SH_{2}	Aristotle (384–322 BC), Ancient Greek philosopher	MPC · 6123
6124 Mecklenburg	1987 SL_{10}	Mecklenburg, a historical region in northern Germany	MPC · 6124
6125 Singto	1989 CN	Singto Pukahuta (1915–2007) was a prominent Thai astronomy educator and author. He was a founder and Director of the Bangkok Planetarium, and president of the Thai Astronomical Society. One of his books, Star Tales, was included in the List of 100 Good Books that Thai Children and Young Adults Should Read	JPL · 6125
6126 Hubelmatt	1989 EW_{1}	Hubelmatt, Swiss borough and school in the city of Lucerne, Switzerland, and the location of the Hubelmatt Observatory operated by the Astronomical Society of Lucerne.	JPL · 6126
6127 Hetherington	1989 HD	Ernest Hetherington, good friend of the mother of the American discoverer Eleanor Helin	MPC · 6127
6128 Lasorda	1989 LA	Tommy Lasorda (1927–2021), former manager of the Los Angeles Dodgers	MPC · 6128
6129 Demokritos	1989 RB_{2}	Democritus (c. 460–370 BC), Ancient Greek philosopher	MPC · 6129
6130 Hutton	1989 SL_{5}	James Hutton (1726–1797), Scottish founder of modern geology	JPL · 6130
6131 Towen	1990 OO_{3}	Tobias C. Owen (1936–2017), American planetary scientist of the Institute for Astronomy of the University of Hawaii	MPC · 6131
6132 Danielson	1990 QY_{3}	G. Edward Danielson (1939–2005), an American Engineer, see Danielson (crater)	MPC · 6132
6133 Royaldutchastro	1990 RC_{3}	The Royal Netherlands Association for Meteorology and Astronomy (KNVWS, Koninklijke Nederlandse Vereniging voor Weer- en Sterrenkunde), established in 1901, is a federation of more than fifty amateur organizations and public observatories	JPL · 6133
6134 Kamagari	1990 RA_{5}	The Japanese town Kamagari in Hiroshima prefecture. The Kamagari astronomical observatory is located in this area.	JPL · 6134
6135 Billowen	1990 RD_{9}	William Mann Owen Jr. (born 1954), an astronomer at the Jet Propulsion Laboratory	MPC · 6135
6136 Gryphon	1990 YH	Gryphon, a fictional character in Lewis Carroll's Alice's adventures in Wonderland. The Gryphon had an eagle's head, a front half with wings and talons, and at the back a lion's legs and tail.	JPL · 6136
6137 Johnfletcher	1991 BY	John Fletcher (born 1947), British amateur astronomer and public educator	JPL · 6137
6138 Miguelhernández	1991 JH_{1}	Miguel Hernández (1910–1942) was a poet who fought for peace and the Republic during the Spanish Civil War. He was incarcerated in several fascist prison camps until his death at the summit of the repression. His name went into oblivion until the collapse of the fascist dictatorship, when his plays and poems were rediscovered.	JPL · 6138
6139 Naomi	1992 AD_{1}	Naomi Sugie (born 1966), wife of Japanese astronomer Atsushi Sugie, who discovered this minor planet	MPC · 6139
6140 Kubokawa	1992 AT_{1}	Kazuo Kubokawa (1903–1943), a Japanese astronomer and discoverer of 1139 Atami	MPC · 6140
6141 Durda	1992 YC_{3}	Daniel David Durda (born 1965), an American astronomer and board member of the B612 Foundation Src	MPC · 6141
6142 Tantawi	1993 FP	Muhammad Tantawi (1845–1889) was an Egyptian astronomer and mathematician, who was born in Tanta and later settled in Damascus, Syria. He is well known for reconstructing the ancient sundial in Umayyad Mosque in the ancient city of Damascus, which was originally made by Syrian astronomer Ibn al-Shatir.	JPL · 6142
6143 Pythagoras	1993 JV	Pythagoras (c. 570–495 BC), Greek philosopher and mathematician	MPC · 6143
6144 Kondojiro	1994 EQ_{3}	Jiro Kondo (born 1951), a Japanese Egyptologist and amateur astronomer	JPL · 6144
6145 Riemenschneider	2630 P-L	Tilman Riemenschneider (1460–1531), German sculptor	MPC · 6145
6146 Adamkrafft	3262 T-2	Adam Kraft (c. 1460–1509), German sculptor	MPC · 6146
6147 Straub	1081 T-3	Johann Baptist Straub (1704–1784), German sculptor	MPC · 6147
6148 Ignazgünther	5119 T-3	Ignaz Günther (1725–1775), German sculptor	MPC · 6148
6149 Pelčák	1979 SS	Oldřich Pelčák (born 1943), Czech cosmonaut-candidate	MPC · 6149
6150 Neukum	1980 FR_{1}	Gerhard Neukum (1944–2014), German astronomer and director of the DLR Institute for Planetary Research (de)	MPC · 6150
6151 Viget	1987 WF	Princeton University and its motto "Dei Sub Numine Viget", or "Under the Power of God She Flourishes"	MPC · 6151
6152 Empedocles	1989 GB_{3}	Empedocles (c. 490–430 BC), Ancient Greek philosopher	MPC · 6152
6153 Hershey	1990 OB	Wesley Lamar Hershey (1913–1989), director of the Caltech "Y" at the California Institute of Technology for 30 years	MPC · 6153
6154 Stevesynnott	1990 QP_{1}	Stephen P. Synnott (born 1946), American astronomer and discoverer of moons	MPC · 6154
6155 Yokosugano	1990 VY_{2}	Yōko Sugano, wife of Matsuo Sugano	MPC · 6155
6156 Dall	1991 AF_{1}	Horace E. Dall (1901–1986), British telescope designer	MPC · 6156
6157 Prey	1991 RX_{2}	Adalbert Prey (1873–1949), Austrian professor of astronomy in Innsbruck, Prague and Vienna	MPC · 6157
6158 Shosanbetsu	1991 VB_{3}	The Japanese village of Shosanbetsu with its Shosanbetsu Observatory located on Hokkaido. "Shosanbetsu" means a river where the waterfall is flowing out in the native Ainu language. The village has a population of about 1450 and was established in 1909. The observatory operates a 0.65-meter reflector telescope.	JPL · 6158
6159 Andréseloy	1991 YH	Andrés Eloy Martínez (born 1963) is a Mexican astronomer and science popularizer known in his country for his radio dramatization of the novel War of the Worlds. He loves creating science videos for the Internet. His biggest concerns are global warming and an asteroid impact on Earth.	JPL · 6159
6160 Minakata	1993 JF	Kumagusu Minakata, Japanese author and naturalist	MPC · 6160
6161 Vojno-Yasenetsky	1971 TY_{2}	Luka Voyno-Yasenetsky (1877–1961), Ukrainian surgeon and theologian	MPC · 6161
6162 Prokhorov	1973 SR_{6}	Yuri Prokhorov (1929–2013), Russian mathematician	MPC · 6162
6163 Reimers	1977 FT	Dieter Reimers (1943–2021), German astronomer and director of the Hamburg Observatory	MPC · 6163
6164 Gerhardmüller	1977 RF_{2}	Gerhard Friedrich Müller (Miller, according to traditional spelling in Russian; 1705–1783), first rector of St. Petersburg University and editor of the first Russian academic journal. He is considered the father of St. Petersburg's historical school, and his works were the foundation for research on the history, ethnography, archeology and geography of Russia and Siberia	JPL · 6164
6165 Frolova	1978 PD_{3}	Natalia Borisovna Frolova, assistant professor of astronomy at Ural State University in Ekaterinburg. She worked on a detailed catalogue of stars along the path of comet 1P/Halley, and this contributed to the success of the space missions Vega and Giotto. As a leader in educating local schoolchildren about astronomy, she takes an active part in organizing the annual Winter Astronomical Students' School at Kourovskay Observatory	JPL · 6165
6166 Univsima	1978 SP_{4}	Simferopol State University on the Crimean peninsula, on the occasion of the 18th anniversary of its establishment	MPC · 6166
6167 Narmanskij	1979 QB_{10}	Vladimir Yakovlevich Narmanskij (born 1948), Crimean amateur astronomer and founder of the "Heliorythm", an amateur research laboratory	MPC · 6167
6168 Isnello	1981 EB_{1}	Isnello, a pleasant village in Sicily's Madonie Natural Park, has long been famous for its traditional refined embroidery. It is now becoming an important center for astronomy with the realization of the Parco Astronomico delle Madonie, an international center devoted to popularization of and research in astronomy	JPL · 6168
6169 Sashakrot	1981 EX_{4}	Aleksandr Krot (born 1959), cosmochemist and meteoriticist	MPC · 6169
6170 Levasseur	1981 GP	Anny-Chantal Levasseur-Regourd (1945–1922) a French planetary scientist and former astronaut candidate. She has been professor at UPMC in Paris and works at the French National Center for Scientific Research, CNRS. Her research includes comets, the interplanetary medium and interplanetary dust. She has also been a principal investigator when the Giotto spacecraft visited Comet Halley in 1986.	MPC · 6170
6171 Uttorp	1981 UT	Uttorp, a village in southeastern Sweden, is part of a nature reserve used by the local astronomy club Karlskrona Astronomiförening. In 2010 the site, renowned for its dark skies, also saw the launch of an annual astronomy conference open to amateur astronomers and the public. The name was suggested by U. Petersson	JPL · 6171
6172 Prokofeana	1982 TX	Valentina Vladimirovna Prokof'eva (born 1929), Russian astrophysicist at the Crimean Astrophysical Observatory	MPC · 6172
6173 Jimwestphal	1983 AD	James Westphal (1930–2004), American astronomer and director of the Palomar Observatory during the 1990s	MPC · 6173
6174 Polybius	1983 TR_{2}	Polybius (c. 208–125 BC), Ancient Greek historian	MPC · 6174
6175 Cori	1983 XW	Carl Ferdinand Cori (1896–1984) and Gerty Cori (1896–1957), husband and wife Austro-Hungarian-American biochemists	MPC · 6175
6176 Horrigan	1985 BH	Barbara Llewellyn Horrigan (1915–2005), American member of the Arlington Friends of the Drama (Massachusetts), actress, director, and set and costume designer	JPL · 6176
6177 Fécamp	1986 CE_{2}	Fécamp is a small town located in Normandy, France. The history of Fécamp rests with that of its abbey	JPL · 6177
6179 Brett	1986 EN	Robin Brett (1935–2019), an Australian-born geochemist studies of meteoricist, responsible for the study of the Apollo lunar samples	MPC · 6179
6180 Bystritskaya	1986 PX_{4}	Ehlina Avraamovna Bystritskaya (1928 – 2019), Soviet theatre and film actress	JPL · 6180
6181 Bobweber	1986 RW	Robert Weber (1926–2008), an American physicist and astronomer, team leader of the Deep Space Satellite Tracking Network, and co-developer of the LINEAR project. He is also a discoverer of minor planets.	JPL · 6181
6182 Katygord	1987 SC_{4}	Katherine Carson Gordon Kron (1917–2011), astronomer at the Lick Observatory and wife of astronomer Gerald Kron †	MPC · 6182
6183 Viscome	1987 SF_{7}	George R. Viscome (born 1956), American broadcast technician, astrometrist, and discoverer of minor planets	MPC · 6183
6184 Nordlund	1987 UQ_{3}	Aake Nordlund, Danish astrophysicist and professor of astrophysics at the University of Copenhagen	MPC · 6184
6185 Mitsuma	1987 YD	Shigeo Mitsuma (1956–2012) was a member of Hoshinohiroba (the Japanese Comet Observers Network) and an independent discoverer of C/1987 B1 (Nishikawa-Takamizawa-Tago). He also observed sunspots and search for novae	JPL · 6185
6186 Zenon	1988 CC_{2}	Zeno of Elea (c. 495–430 BC), Ancient Greek philosopher and mathematician, known for Zeno's paradoxes	MPC · 6186
6187 Kagura	1988 RD_{5}	The Kagura is a Shinto theatrical dance, that has been performed in sacred places and on special occasions for a thousand years in Japan	JPL · 6187
6188 Robertpepin	1988 SW_{2}	Robert Pepin (1933–2023), American meteoriticist and professor at the University of Minnesota	MPC · 6188
6189 Völk	1989 EY_{2}	Elisabeth Völk, secretary of ESO headquarters	MPC · 6189
6190 Rennes	1989 TJ_{1}	The French city of Rennes	MPC · 6190
6191 Eades	1989 WN_{1}	George Eades, a structural engineer, microscopist and member of the British Astronomical Association	MPC · 6191
6192 Javiergorosabel	1990 KB_{1}	Javier Gorosabel (1969–2015) was a Spanish astronomer, born in the Basque Country. His contributions to the study of \gamma -ray bursts were crucial for the development of that field. He was an eager popularizer of astronomy.	JPL · 6192
6193 Manabe	1990 QC_{1}	Yoshinosuke or Ryōnosuke Manabe (1926–1983), Japanese orbit computer at Tokyo Astronomical Observatory	MPC · 6193
6194 Denali	1990 TN	Denali, rising 6,194 meters above sea level, is the tallest peak in North America. The name Denali originates from the Tanana Indian language and translates into English as "The Great One". The Tanana Indians are a subgroup of the Athabaskans; the Athabaskans were the original inhabitants of central and south central Alaska. Name proposed by D. Hamilton	JPL · 6194
6195 Nukariya	1990 VL_{2}	Motoi Nukariya (born 1943), Japanese astronomer and former software development at the Tokyo Astronomical Observatory	MPC · 6195
6196 Bernardbowen	1991 UO_{4}	Bernard Bowen was the founding chair of the International Centre for Radio Astronomy Research and was instrumental in its establishment in 2009. He helped bring part of the Square Kilometre Array telescope to Western Australia. He has also had a distinguished career in Australian marine science and environmental protection.	MPC · 6196
6197 Taracho	1992 AB_{1}	Tara is a town in Saga prefecture. The preparation of dried seaweed is its main industry, and Tara mandarin oranges are famous. The Saga Astronomical Society's 0.60-m reflector at the Tara Observatory is familiar to many of the local residents. The name was suggested by Y. Yamada	JPL · 6197
6198 Shirakawa	1992 AF_{1}	The Japanese city of Shirakawa in Fukushima Prefecture	MPC · 6198
6199 Yoshiokayayoi	1992 BK_{1}	Yoshioka Yayoi (1871–1959), Japanese physician and women's rights activist	MPC · 6199
6200 Hachinohe	1993 HL	Akio Hachinohe (born 1958), Japanese amateur astronomer on Hokkaido	MPC · 6200

== 6201–6300 ==
back to top

Named minor planet	Provisional	This minor planet was named for...	Ref · Catalog
6201 Ichiroshimizu	1993 HY	Ichiro Shimizu (1923–1996), Japanese astronomer †	MPC · 6201
6202 Georgemiley	3332 T-1	George K. Miley (born 1942), an Irish-Dutch astronomer	MPC · 6202
6203 Lyubamoroz	1981 EC_{23}	Lyubov Moroz (born 1966), spectroscopist at the German Aerospace Center in Berlin	MPC · 6203
6204 MacKenzie	1981 JB_{3}	Norman Hugh MacKenzie (1915–2004), a professor of English at universities in Zimbabwe and Canada	MPC · 6204
6205 Menottigalli	1983 OD	Menotti Galli (born 1922), Italian physicist at University of Bologna	MPC · 6205
6206 Corradolamberti	1985 TB_{1}	Corrado Lamberti, Italian astronomer; writer and popularizer of astronomy	MPC · 6206
6207 Bourvil	1988 BV	Bourvil (1917–1970), French actor and singer	MPC · 6207
6208 Wakata	1988 XT	Koichi Wakata (born 1963), Japanese astronaut	MPC · 6208
6209 Schwaben	1990 TF_{4}	Swabia, region in southwest Germany	MPC · 6209
6210 Hyunseop	1991 AX_{1}	Seo Hyun-seop (born 1944), Korean diplomat † Archived 2012-02-04 at the Wayback Machine	MPC · 6210
6211 Tsubame	1991 DO	Tsubame, Japanese former express train running from Tokyo to Osaka or Kobe	MPC · 6211
6212 Franzthaler	1993 MS_{1}	Franz Thaler (1925–2015) was an author from South Tyrol, Italy and a survivorof Dachau and Hersbruck. Thaler's memoir, Unvergessen (Unforgotten), initiated theprocess of coming to terms with what happened during the Nazi era. He was a firm believer in the peaceful coexistence of the three ethnic groups living in South Tyrol.	MPC · 6212
6213 Zwiers	2196 P-L	Hendrikus Johannes Zwiers (1865–1923), Dutch astronomer at the Leiden Observatory.	MPC · 6213
6214 Mikhailgrinev	1971 SN_{2}	Mikhail Vasil'evich Grinev (born 1929), Russian surgeon, director of St. Petersburg Djanelidze Research Institute of Emergency Medicine from 1984 to 1998, member of the board of directors of the European Association of Trauma and Emergency Surgery, professor of St. Petersburg Medical University and medical academy for postgraduate training. Grinev is internationally renowned for his classic research in the field of emergency surgery, polytrauma and shock. Name suggested by the Institute of Applied Astronomy and Djanelidze Research Institute of Emergency Medicine	JPL · 6214
6215 Mehdia	1973 EK	Mehdia, Morocco (Arabic for "gift"), is a region in Morocco with rich natural resources. The forest and the Sidi Boughaba lake are home to thousands of species, including endangered migrating birds from Europe and Sub-Saharan Africa, which prefer to spend the winter in the calm, warm waters of Sidi Boughaba.	MPC · 6215
6216 San Jose	1975 SJ	The city of San Jose in northern California Src	MPC · 6216
6217 Kodai	1975 XH	Kodai Fukushima (born 1991) is a founder of the student club Libertyer. He made the original proposal of the chosen names "Libertas" and "Fortitudo" for the host star Xi Aquilae and its exoplanet Xi Aquilae b in the IAU's NameExoWorlds contest.	MPC · 6217
6218 Mizushima	1977 EG_{7}	A town of Kurashiki, Okayama, Japan	MPC · 6218
6219 Demalia	1978 PX_{2}	Aleksandra Alekseevna Demenko (1930–1983), Ukrainian astronomer from Kyiv and cometary researcher	MPC · 6219
6220 Stepanmakarov	1978 SN_{7}	Stepan Makarov (1849–1904), Russian vice-admiral and oceanographer	MPC · 6220
6221 Ducentesima	1980 GO	Latin for "200", for 200th asteroid discovered at Kleť Observatory	MPC · 6221
6223 Dahl	1980 RD_{1}	Roald Dahl, British author	MPC · 6223
6224 El Goresy	1981 EK_{8}	Ahmed El Goresy (born 1933), Egyptian mineralogist at the Max-Planck-Institut †	MPC · 6224
6225 Hiroko	1981 EK_{12}	Hiroko Nagahara (born 1952), Japanese meteoriticist	MPC · 6225
6226 Paulwarren	1981 EY_{18}	Paul Warren (born 1953), American research geochemist	MPC · 6226
6227 Alanrubin	1981 EQ_{42}	Alan Rubin (born 1953), American research geochemist	MPC · 6227
6228 Yonezawa	1982 BA	Yonezawa, Yamagata, Japan	MPC · 6228
6229 Tursachan	1983 VN_{7}	Gaelic for "Standing Stones" (1997 Flagstaff Festival of Science asteroid naming contest winner) †	MPC · 6229
6230 Fram	1984 SG_{1}	Fram, the ship that was built specially for polar research. It was used in expeditions of the Arctic and Antarctic regions by the Norwegian explorers F. Nansen, O. Sverdrup, O. Wisting and R. Amundsen. Fram is preserved at the Fram Museum in Oslo, Norway.	JPL · 6230
6231 Hundertwasser	1985 FH	Friedensreich Hundertwasser (1928–2000), Austrian artist	MPC · 6231
6232 Zubitskia	1985 SJ_{3}	Danila Nikiforovich Zubitskij and Natalia Petrovna Zubitska, doctors and phyto-therapists in Kyiv, who have developed original methods of treatment using herbal medicines. The authors of several books, they are well known in Ukraine, and their methods and preparations are also being used in other countries. Natalia Petrovna, who has a broadcast program in Kyiv about herbs and "people's medicine", has also published several books of poetry	JPL · 6232
6233 Kimura	1986 CG	Hisashi Kimura (1870–1943), Japanese astronomer	MPC · 6233
6234 Sheilawolfman	1986 SF	Sheila Wolfman (née Sala Fajerman, 1930–2005), Polish child survivor of the holocaust, pictured in Martin Gilbert's book The Boys	MPC · 6234
6235 Burney	1987 VB	Venetia Burney (1918–2009), English woman who, at age 11, suggested the name Pluto for the "ninth planet"	JPL · 6235
6236 Mallard	1988 WF	LNER Class A4 4468 Mallard, British steam locomotive	MPC · 6236
6237 Chikushi	1989 CV	Chikuzen and Chikugo Province, former name of Fukuoka prefecture, Japan †	MPC · 6237
6238 Septimaclark	1989 NM	Septima Poinsette Clark, (May 3, 1898 – December 15, 1987) was a black American educator and civil rights activist. Clark developed the literacy and citizenship workshops that played an important role in the drive for voting rights and civil rights for African Americans in the Civil Rights Movement	MPC · 6238
6239 Minos	1989 QF	Minos, king of Crete and son of Zeus and Europa	MPC · 6239
6240 Lucretius Carus	1989 SL_{1}	Titus Lucretius Carus, Roman poet and philosopher †	MPC · 6240
6241 Galante	1989 TG	Maria Pia Galante (born 1916) wife of Ciro Vacchi, owner and director of the San Vittore Observatory in Italy	MPC · 6241
6243 Yoder	1990 OT_{3}	Charles Finney Yoder (born 1943), American astronomer	MPC · 6243
6244 Okamoto	1990 QF	Hiroshi Okamoto (born 1915), Japanese primary school teacher of discoverer Src	MPC · 6244
6245 Ikufumi	1990 SO_{4}	Ikufumi Makino, Japanese telecommunications systems engineer and amateur astronomer †	MPC · 6245
6246 Komurotoru	1990 VX_{2}	Toru Komuro (1899–1953), Japanese sculptor	MPC · 6246
6247 Amanogawa	1990 WY_{3}	Amanogawa River, Hokkaidō, Japan (In Japanese, "Amanogawa" means also "Milky Way")	MPC · 6247
6248 Bardon	1991 BM_{2}	Zdeněk Bardon (b. 1961), a Czech amateur astronomer, photographer.	IAU · 6248
6249 Jennifer	1991 JF_{1}	Jennifer Jones (1919–2009), American actress	MPC · 6249
6250 Saekohayashi	1991 VX_{1}	Saeko S. Hayashi (born 1958) is an associate professor at the National Astronomical Observatory of Japan.	JPL · 6250
6251 Setsuko	1992 DB	Setsuko Akiyama, wife of one of discoverers	MPC · 6251
6252 Montevideo	1992 EV_{11}	Montevideo, Uruguay, birthplace of Gonzalo Tancredi, one of the discoverers † Archived 2007-06-24 at the Wayback Machine	MPC · 6252
6255 Kuma	1994 XT	Kumakōgen, Japanese town on Shikoku and location of the Kuma Kogen Astronomical Observatory	MPC · 6255
6256 Canova	4063 P-L	Antonio Canova (1757–1822), Italian sculptor	MPC · 6256
6257 Thorvaldsen	4098 T-1	Bertel Thorvaldsen (1768–1844), Danish sculptor	MPC · 6257
6258 Rodin	3070 T-2	Auguste Rodin (1840–1917), French sculptor	MPC · 6258
6259 Maillol	3236 T-2	Aristide Maillol (1861–1944), French sculptor	MPC · 6259
6260 Kelsey	1949 PN	Frances Oldham Kelsey (1914–2015), Canadian-American pharmacologist	MPC · 6260
6261 Chione	1976 WC	Chione (daughter of Daedalion) from Greek mythology, mother of Philammon and Autolycus by Apollo and Hermes, respectively	MPC · 6261
6262 Javid	1978 RZ	Huseyn Javid (1882–1941), Azerbaijani poet, playwright and historian	MPC · 6262
6263 Druckmüller	1980 PX	Miloslav Druckmüller (born 1954) is a Czech mathematician, astronomy popularizer and photographer, who developed an innovative method to visualize the solar corona during total eclipses of the Sun. He has stretched the limits of scientific astrophotography, leading to a variety of discoveries.	JPL · 6263
6266 Letzel	1986 TB_{3}	Jan Letzel, Czech architect	MPC · 6266
6267 Rozhen	1987 SO_{9}	The Rozhen Observatory (also known as the Bulgarian National Astronomical Observatory) on Mount Rozhen, near Chepelare, Bulgaria	MPC · 6267
6268 Versailles	1990 SS_{5}	The French city of Versailles, known for its Château de Versailles and the gardens of Versailles,	MPC · 6268
6269 Kawasaki	1990 UJ	Shun'ichi Kawasaki (1896–1943), Japanese astronomer	MPC · 6269
6270 Kabukuri	1991 BD	Kabukuri-numa is a marsh in Miyagi prefecture in northeastern Japan	JPL · 6270
6271 Farmer	1991 NF	Crofton Bernard Farmer (1931–2021), researcher in Earth and planetary atmospheres, visiting scientist at JPL, awardee of the NASA Exceptional Scientific Achievement Medal, and of crucial assistance to the Near-Earth Asteroid Tracking program	MPC · 6271
6273 Kiruna	1992 ER_{31}	Kiruna, northernmost city of Sweden † Archived 2007-06-24 at the Wayback Machine	MPC · 6273
6274 Taizaburo	1992 FV	Taizaburo Koyama (1927–), Japanese astrophotographer and inventor of the "Sky Memo", a portable automatic equatorial telescope	MPC · 6274
6275 Kiryu	1993 VQ	Kiryū, Gunma, Japan	MPC · 6275
6276 Kurohone	1994 AB	The Japanese village of Kurohone, located in Seta District of Gunma Prefecture	MPC · 6276
6277 Siok	1949 QC_{1}	Steve (born 1949) and Kathy (born 1949) Siok have been members of the Skyscrapers astronomy club of Rhode Island, USA for more than forty years, during which time they have held a variety of leadership positions	JPL · 6277
6278 Ametkhan	1971 TF	Amet-khan Sultan (1920–1971), Soviet test pilot and Tatar air ace during World War II	MPC · 6278
6280 Sicardy	1980 RJ	Bruno Sicardy (born 1958), French professor of astronomy at Pierre and Marie Curie University in Paris, and researcher in Solar System dynamics	MPC · 6280
6281 Strnad	1980 SD	Antonín Strnad (1747–1799), Czech astronomer	MPC · 6281
6282 Edwelda	1980 TS_{4}	Edwin Aguirre and Imelda Joson, Filipino associate editor and photo editor, respectively, at Sky & Telescope magazine † ‡ +	MPC · 6282
6283 Menghuazhu	1980 VX_{1}	Meng-Hua Zhu (born 1981), Chinese planetary scientist in impacts of planets and asteroids	MPC · 6283
6284 Borisivanov	1981 EM_{19}	Boris Ivanov (born 1948), Russian geophysicist	MPC · 6284
6285 Ingram	1981 EA_{26}	Vernon Ingram (1924–2006), German American biologist, and his wife Elizabeth Ingram (born 1940), former Ashdown House housemasters at MIT †	MPC · 6285
6287 Lenham	1984 AR	Alan Pennell Lenham (1930–1996), British amateur astronomer and research scientist at the Royal College of Science in Shrivenham	MPC · 6287
6288 Fouts	1984 ER_{1}	Gary Arnold Fouts (born 1951) an American astronomer and Professor of Astronomy at Santa Monica College	MPC · 6288
6289 Lanusei	1984 HP_{1}	Lanusei, a town in Sardinia, Italy.	JPL · 6289
6291 Renzetti	1985 TM_{1}	Nicholas A. Renzetti (born 1914), physicist, at one time with the Deep Space Network	MPC · 6291
6293 Oberpfalz	1987 WV_{1}	Upper Palatinate (German: Oberpfalz), district in Bavaria, Germany	MPC · 6293
6294 Czerny	1988 CX_{1}	Karl Czerny, Austrian composer and piano teacher †	MPC · 6294
6295 Schmoll	1988 CF_{3}	Antoine Schmoll, German piano teacher †	MPC · 6295
6296 Cleveland	1988 NC	Cleveland, city in the U.S. state of Ohio	MPC · 6296
6298 Sawaoka	1988 XC	Akira Sawaoka (born 1938), a Japanese scientist who synthesized a new type of polycrystalline diamond by a new shock-wave consolidation technique.	JPL · 6298
6299 Reizoutoyoko	1988 XQ_{1}	Reizou and Toyoko Mori, parents of one of discoverers	MPC · 6299
6300 Hosamu	1988 YB	Osamu Hioki, friend of discoverers	MPC · 6300

== 6301–6400 ==
back to top

Named minor planet	Provisional	This minor planet was named for...	Ref · Catalog
6301 Bohumilruprecht	1989 BR_{1}	Bohumil Ruprecht (born 1944), a Czech astronomer, telescope maker and science popularizer from Pardubice, where he co-founded the Baron Arthur Kraus Observatory in 1992 (Src).	IAU · 6301
6302 Tengukogen	1989 CF	Tengu Highland (Tengu Kōgen) is located on the western slope of the Shikoku Mountains on the Shikoku Island, Japan.	MPC · 6302
6304 Josephus Flavius	1989 GT_{3}	Josephus (c. 37–100), Romano-Jewish historian born in Jerusalem whose records give insight into Early Christianity	MPC · 6304
6305 Helgoland	1989 GE_{8}	Heligoland, a German island in the North Sea	MPC · 6305
6306 Nishimura	1989 UL_{3}	Yūji Nishimura (born 1946), a Japanese entrepreneur and president of the optical telescope manufacturer Nishimura Mfg. Co.	MPC · 6306
6307 Maiztegui	1989 WL_{7}	Alberto Maiztegui (1920–2018), Argentinian author and science educator (Src).	JPL · 6307
6308 Ebisuzaki	1990 BK	Toshikazu Ebisuzaki (born 1958) is a Japanese astronomer and director of the computational astrophysics laboratory at Riken, a scientific research institute in Japan (Src).	JPL · 6308
6309 Elsschot	1990 EM_{3}	Willem Elsschot (1882–1960), Flemish–Belgian writer	MPC · 6309
6310 Jankonke	1990 KK	Janis L. Konke, an American space advocate and friend of astronomer Eleanor F. Helin, who discovered this minor planet.	MPC · 6310
6311 Porubčan	1990 RQ_{2}	Vladimír Porubčan (born 1940), Slovak astronomer	JPL · 6311
6312 Robheinlein	1990 RH_{4}	Robert A. Heinlein (1907–1988), American science fiction author	JPL · 6312
6313 Tsurutani	1990 RC_{8}	Bruce Tsurutani (born 1941) has made essential contributions to original research and technical leadership in space science activities for many NASA, NASA-ESA and Japanese space missions. His research activities include instabilities and turbulence in space plasmas, space weather and astrophysical plasmas.	JPL · 6313
6314 Reigber	1990 SQ_{16}	Christoph Reigber (born 1939) has made essential contributions to the determination of the global gravity field using satellite observations, to the study of Earth kinematics using satellites, to atmospheric sounding using radio-occultation techniques, and to the development and operation of satellite missions.	JPL · 6314
6315 Barabash	1990 TS	Stanislav Barabash (born 1964) has made essential contributions to the measurement and understanding of energetic neutral particles around the Earth and the nearest planets, as well as in the boundary regions of the heliosphere.	JPL · 6315
6316 Méndez	1990 TL_{6}	Mariano Méndez (born 1960) has had a productive scientific career as an astronomer in parallel with his tireless activity aimed at helping the advancement of education and science in developing countries, notably as Vice Chair (2006–2010) and then Chair (2010–2018) of the COSPAR Panel on Capacity Building.	JPL · 6316
6317 Dreyfus	1990 UP_{3}	Dreyfus affair, a political scandal that divided France from 1894 to 1906	MPC · 6317
6318 Cronkite	1990 WA	Walter Cronkite (1916–2009), American TV newsreader	MPC · 6318
6319 Beregovoj	1990 WJ_{3}	Georgy Beregovoy (1921–1995), Russian cosmonaut	MPC · 6319
6320 Bremen	1991 AL_{3}	Bremen, a Hanseatic city in northwestern Germany	MPC · 6320
6321 Namuratakao	1991 BV	Takao Namura (born 1937), a Japanese telescope-mirror maker including the one for the National Astronomical Observatory of Japan	MPC · 6321
6323 Karoji	1991 CY_{1}	Hiroshi Karoji, Japanese astronomer.	JPL · 6323
6324 Kejonuma	1991 DN_{1}	Kejo-numa, a marsh in Miyagi prefecture, is a great wintering site for migratory birds. More than 2000 Bean geese, which are an endangered species in Japan, winter there every year. The marsh was designated as a wetland under the Ramsar Convention in 2008. The name was suggested by T. Yusa	JPL · 6324
6326 Idamiyoshi	1991 FJ_{1}	Miyoshi Ida (born 1953), Japanese amateur astronomer.	JPL · 6326
6327 Tijn	1991 GP_{1}	Tijn Kolsteren from the Netherlands, who, at age 6 and diagnosed with an incurable brain tumor, raised over 2 million euros for the International Red Cross, as part of the Dutch charity radio program Serious Request 2016	MPC · 6327
6329 Hikonejyo	1992 EU_{1}	Hikone Castle, a Japanese Edo-period castle in the city of Hikone	JPL · 6329
6330 Koen	1992 FN	Koen Yanagiya (born 1954), a Japanese professional comic story teller, known as rakugoka.	MPC · 6330
6332 Vorarlberg	1992 FP_{3}	Vorarlberg, the westernmost federal state of Austria	JPL · 6332
6333 Helenejacq	1992 LG	Helene Jacquelin, mother of American discoverer Gregory J. Leonard	MPC · 6333
6334 Robleonard	1992 MM	Robert David Leonard Sr, father of American discoverer Gregory J. Leonard	MPC · 6334
6335 Nicolerappaport	1992 NR	Nicole Rappaport (born 1950), a senior research scientist at the Jet Propulsion Laboratory, is an authority on radio science and the use of spacecraft tracking data to determine the masses and gravity fields for the natural satellites. She has also done important work on the dynamics of Saturn's ring particles	JPL · 6335
6336 Dodo	1992 UU	Dodo, a large, flightless bird first discovered in 1507 on the island of Mauritius.	JPL · 6336
6337 Shiota	1992 UC_{4}	Kazuo Shiota (born 1949), Japanese amateur astronomer.	MPC · 6337
6338 Isaosato	1992 UO_{4}	Isao Satō (born 1963), Japanese astronomer and discoverer of minor planets	MPC · 6338
6339 Giliberti	1993 SG	Giuseppina Giliberti (born 1947), wife of Italian discoverer Silvano Casulli	MPC · 6339
6340 Kathmandu	1993 TF_{2}	Kathmandu, the capital city of Nepal	JPL · 6340
6345 Hideo	1994 AX_{1}	Hideo Fukushima (born 1953), Japanese astronomer and discoverer of minor planets	JPL · 6345
6346 Syukumeguri	1995 AY	A part of Kurohone, Gunma, Japan.	JPL · 6346
6349 Acapulco	1995 CN_{1}	The city of Acapulco on the Pacific coast of Mexico	JPL · 6349
6350 Schlüter	3526 P-L	Andreas Schlüter (1659–1714)), German baroque sculptor and architect	MPC · 6350
6351 Neumann	4277 T-1	Balthasar Neumann (1687–1753), German baroque architect	MPC · 6351
6352 Schlaun	2400 T-3	Johann Conrad Schlaun (1695–1773), German baroque architect	MPC · 6352
6353 Semper	3107 T-3	Gottfried Semper (1803–1873), a German architect	MPC · 6353
6354 Vangelis	1934 GA	Vangelis (1943–2022), Greek composer and multi-instrumentalist Src	MPC · 6354
6355 Univermoscow	1969 TX_{5}	The Lomonosov Moscow State University	JPL · 6355
6356 Tairov	1976 QR	Vasilij Egorovich Tairov (1859–1938), Russian viticulturist and oenologist	MPC · 6356
6357 Glushko	1976 SK_{3}	Valentin Glushko (1908–1989), Soviet rocket scientist	MPC · 6357
6358 Chertok	1977 AL_{1}	Boris Chertok (1912–2011), Russian rocket scientist (specialist in guidance and control)	MPC · 6358
6359 Dubinin	1977 AZ_{1}	Yuri Dubinin (1930–2013), Russian Soviet-era diplomat, scientist, author and translator of several books from the French	MPC · 6359
6361 Koppel	1978 VL_{11}	Thomas Koppel (1944–2006), a Danish musician.	JPL · 6361
6362 Tunis	1979 KO	Tunis, the capital and the largest city of Tunisia	JPL · 6362
6363 Doggett	1981 CB_{1}	LeRoy E. Doggett (1941–1996), American astronomer and historian of astronomy	MPC · 6363
6364 Casarini	1981 ET	Jeannine Casarini, French teacher, member of the Tunguska99 scientific expedition to Central Siberia	JPL · 6364
6365 Nickschneider	1981 ES_{29}	Nick Schneider (born 1956), American astronomer who pioneered observing mutual occultation and eclipsing events	MPC · 6365
6366 Rainerwieler	1981 UM_{22}	Rainer Wieler (born 1949), Swiss geochemist at the Swiss Federal Institute of Technology	MPC · 6366
6368 Richardmenendez	1983 RM_{3}	Richard Menendez (born 1957) has taught astronomy at St. Louis Community College for the last 14 years with his own curriculum aimed toward concepts and ideas for classroom teachers. He has done over 900 hours of public-outreach astronomy and has been a board member of the St. Louis Astronomical Society.	JPL · 6368
6370 Malpais	1984 EY	Spanish for "bad country"/"badlands", used by early explorers of the American Southwest to designate difficult-going countryside strewn with rough lava flows or rocks, and now used to designate the rock found in such country, used for stone building construction (1999 Flagstaff Festival of Science asteroid naming contest winner) †	MPC · 6370
6371 Heinlein	1985 GS	Dieter Heinlein (born 1958), meteorite and tektite collector for the Bavarian Meteorite Laboratory †‡	MPC · 6371
6372 Walker	1985 JW_{1}	Robert M. Walker (1929–2004), American meteoricist at Washington University. He was a leading figure in the study of radiation damage in solids and in the investigation of interstellar grains recovered from meteorites. His work on fission tracks with others opened a new approach to the dating of rocks on the earth and the moon and led to new information on the energy spectrum, composition and flux of solar and galactic cosmic rays. He founded whole new methods of scientific study and created a premier center for research in these new fields at Washington University, where he has provided inspiring leadership to a host of students and post-doctoral fellows.	MPC · 6372
6373 Stern	1986 EZ	Alan Stern (born 1957), American astronomer	MPC · 6373
6374 Beslan	1986 PY_{4}	The Russian town of Beslan	JPL · 6374
6375 Fredharris	1986 TB_{5}	Frederick Harlan Harris, engineer and expert in CCD photometry at Caltech and Palomar, and was later involved in the Sloan Digital Sky Survey.	MPC · 6375
6376 Schamp	1987 KD_{1}	Larry and Becky Schamp, Americans stationed in Alice Springs, Australia, who took in members of the Shoemaker family after the car collision in which Eugene died	JPL · 6376
6377 Cagney	1987 ML_{1}	James Cagney (1899–1986), American actor	MPC · 6377
6379 Vrba	1987 VA_{1}	Karel Vrba (1845–1922), Czech mineralogy professor	MPC · 6379
6380 Gardel	1988 CG	Carlos Gardel (1890–1935), a singer, composer and actor who recorded during his lifetime hundreds of songs and composed together with Alfredo Le Pera famous tangos such as Mi Buenos Aires querido, Volver or Por una cabeza. The name was suggested by W. A. Fröger	JPL · 6380
6381 Toyama	1988 DO_{1}	Miyuki Toyama (born 1953), Japanese amateur astronomer and illustrator	JPL · 6381
6383 Tokushima	1988 XU_{1}	Tokushima-Kainan Astronomical Observatory, located in the Tokushima Prefecture, Japan, owned by the first discover, Masayuki Iwamoto.	MPC · 6383
6384 Kervin	1989 AM	Paul W. Kervin, American physicist and chief scientist of the AMOS research station at Haleakala Observatory on Maui, Hawaii	MPC · 6384
6385 Martindavid	1989 EC_{2}	Martin Alois David (1757–1836), Czech astronomer and observatory director	MPC · 6385
6386 Keithnoll	1989 NK_{1}	Keith Noll (born 1958), American astronomer discoverer of numerous trans-Neptunian binaries	MPC · 6386
6389 Ogawa	1990 BX	Shigeo Ogawa (born 1932), president of Seibundo-Shinkosha (publisher)	MPC · 6389
6390 Hirabayashi	1990 BG_{1}	Shigeto Hirabayashi (born 1953), Japanese amateur astronomer	MPC · 6390
6391 Africano	1990 BN_{2}	John L. Africano (1951–2006), astronomer with the AMOS research station at Haleakala Observatory on Maui, Hawaii	MPC · 6391
6392 Takashimizuno	1990 HR	Takashi Mizuno (born 1955), Japanese amateur astronomer	MPC · 6392
6395 Hilliard	1990 UE_{1}	Elizabeth Hilliard (1904–) and Leslie Hilliard (1905–), the donators of what is now the Herschel Museum of Astronomy in Bath, England	MPC · 6395
6396 Schleswig	1991 AO_{3}	Schleswig, the most northern state of Germany	MPC · 6396
6398 Timhunter	1991 CD_{1}	Tim Hunter, American amateur astronomer	MPC · 6398
6399 Harada	1991 GA	Shoji Harada (born 1953), Japanese amateur astronomer Src	MPC · 6399
6400 Georgealexander	1991 GQ_{1}	George Alexander, a public-affairs manager in Jet Propulsion Laboratory. JPL	MPC · 6400

== 6401–6500 ==
back to top

Named minor planet	Provisional	This minor planet was named for...	Ref · Catalog
6401 Röntgen	1991 GB_{2}	Wilhelm Röntgen (1845–1923), German physicist and Nobelist	MPC · 6401
6402 Holstein	1991 GQ_{10}	Holstein, southern part of the German state of Schleswig-Holstein	MPC · 6402
6403 Steverin	1991 NU	Steven Newburn and Erin Fischer on the occasion of their marriage. Steven is the son of Ray Newburn, science coordinator for near-Earth objects at the Jet Propulsion Laboratory and former co-leader of the International Halley Watch	MPC · 6403
6404 Vanavara	1991 PS_{6}	Vanavara, town in Siberia near the Tunguska impact site Src	MPC · 6404
6405 Komiyama	1992 HJ	Fukuji Komiyama (born 1924), a Japanese agriculture and forestry technician.	JPL · 6405
6406 Mikejura	1992 MJ	Michael Jura (1947–2016) was as an American astronomer and UCLA professor whose work on polluted white dwarfs first enabled the measurement of the chemical compositions of extrasolar asteroids.	JPL · 6406
6408 Saijo	1992 UT_{5}	Yoshihiro Saijo (born 1959), Japanese amateur astronomer	MPC · 6408
6410 Fujiwara	1992 WO_{4}	Masahito Fujiwara (1960–1997), Japanese amateur astronomer who contributed to the popularization of astronomy.	JPL · 6410
6411 Tamaga	1993 TA	The Astronomer (TA), a British amateur astronomy magazine, founded under the name The Casual Astronomer by James Muirden in 1964. The interest of the discoverer, Robert H. McNaught, in observational astronomy was spurred by this astronomy magazine.	MPC · 6411
6412 Kaifu	1993 TL_{2}	Norio Kaifu (1943–2019), Japanese astronomer and first director of the 8.2-meter Subaru Telescope in Hawaii	MPC · 6412
6413 Iye	1993 TJ_{3}	Masanori Iye (born 1949), Japanese astronomer and professor at the National Astronomical Observatory of Japan. He led the engineering core team that designed and manufactured the Subaru Telescope. Iye researches the structure and evolution of galaxies.	MPC · 6413
6414 Mizunuma	1993 UX	A part of Kurohone, Gunma, Japan	MPC · 6414
6416 Nyukasayama	1993 VY_{3}	Mount Nyūkasa, a mountain in central Japan.	JPL · 6416
6417 Liberati	1993 XA	Libero Liberati (1926–1962), motorcyclist who won the Absolute Italian Championship in 1955 and 1956 riding a four-cylinder Gilera.	JPL · 6417
6418 Hanamigahara	1993 XJ	Hanamigahara, a beautiful forest park in the northern part of Kurohone village, Gunma prefecture.	JPL · 6418
6419 Susono	1993 XX	The Japanese city of Susono, Shizuoka in eastern Shizuoka Prefecture. The city is located near the discoverers' observing site at Mishima	MPC · 6419
6420 Riheijyaya	1993 XG_{1}	Riheijyaya, a beautiful forest park in the western part of Kurohone village, Gunma prefecture.	JPL · 6420
6422 Akagi	1994 CD_{1}	Mount Akagi, 1828 m above sea level, is a large stratovolcano in the mid-eastern part of Gunma prefecture.	JPL · 6422
6423 Harunasan	1994 CP_{2}	Mount Haruna, 1449 m above sea level, and one of the Three Jomo Mountains, is located in the central part of Gunma prefecture	JPL · 6423
6424 Ando	1994 EN_{3}	Hiroyasu Ando (born 1946), Japanese astronomer and chairman of the Optical and Infrared Astronomy Division of the National Astronomical Observatory of Japan who is an expert in stellar oscillations and high-resolution spectroscopy.	MPC · 6424
6426 Vanýsek	1995 ED	Vladimír Vanýsek (born 1926), a Czech astronomer and professor emeritus of astrophysics at Charles University in Prague.	MPC · 6426
6428 Barlach	3513 P-L	Ernst Barlach (1870–1938), German sculptor, graphic artist and poet	MPC · 6428
6429 Brâncuși	4050 T-1	Constantin Brâncuși (1876–1957), Romanian sculptor	MPC · 6429
6432 Temirkanov	1975 TR_{2}	Yuri Temirkanov (born 1938), Russian conductor	MPC · 6432
6433 Enya	1978 WC	Enya (Eithne Ní Bhraonáin; born 1961), Irish singer and songwriter Src	MPC · 6433
6434 Jewitt	1981 OH	David C. Jewitt (born 1958), British astronomer and discoverer of minor planets	MPC · 6434
6435 Daveross	1984 DA	David Justin Ross (born 1949), co-developer of the Prime Rib curve, a graphical display of energy requirements for rendezvous trajectories.	JPL · 6435
6436 Coco	1985 JX_{1}	Mark Coco, an author of astronomical articles and an active observer, and his family	MPC · 6436
6437 Stroganov	1987 QS_{7}	The Stroganov family of Russia, who exploited the iron and gold mines of the Urals	JPL · 6437
6438 Suárez	1988 BS_{3}	Buenaventura Suárez (1678–1750) Argentine Jesuit and astronomer who observed the eclipses of Jupiter's satellites.	JPL · 6438
6439 Tirol	1988 CV	Tyrol, federal state in western Austria	MPC · 6439
6440 Ransome	1988 RA_{2}	Arthur Ransome (1884–1967), British novelist	MPC · 6440
6441 Milenajesenská	1988 RR_{2}	Milena Jesenská (1896–1944), Czech journalist	MPC · 6441
6442 Salzburg	1988 RU_{3}	Salzburg, state in Austria	MPC · 6442
6443 Harpalion	1988 RH_{12}	Harpalion, from Greek mythology. He was the son of King Pylaemenes, a Trojan ally. Harpalion was killed by Meriones, while his father was killed by Menelaus during the Trojan War.	IAU · 6443
6444 Ryuzin	1989 WW	Ryuzin, a small town within Toyota city, Aichi prefecture, Japan	JPL · 6444
6445 Bellmore	1990 FS_{1}	Tamara Bell and Michael More on the occasion of their wedding. They are recent graduates of the University of Arizona with degrees in political science and geology. The discoverer and her husband wish the newlyweds a harmonious marriage and rewarding careers.	JPL · 6445
6446 Lomberg	1990 QL	Jon Lomberg (born 1948), American space artist and science journalist	JPL · 6446
6447 Terrycole	1990 TO_{1}	Terry Cole, chief technologist at the Jet Propulsion Laboratory and senior faculty associate in the Caltech Division of Chemistry and Chemical Engineering.	JPL · 6447
6449 Kudara	1991 CL_{1}	Kyoyu Kudara (1894–1964), Japanese astronomer, second president of Oriental Astronomical Association	JPL · 6449
6450 Masahikohayashi	1991 GV_{1}	Masahiko Hayashi (born 1959), professor of astronomy at the Department of Astronomy of the University of Tokyo	MPC · 6450
6451 Kärnten	1991 GP_{10}	Carinthia (German: Kärnten), the southernmost province of Austria	MPC · 6451
6452 Johneuller	1991 HA	John E. Euller, American physics teacher at Eastridge High School in Irondequoit, New York	MPC · 6452
6456 Golombek	1992 OM	Matthew P. Golombek, American planetary geologist	MPC · 6456
6457 Kremsmünster	1992 RT	The town of Kremsmünster and its Benedictine monastery, in Upper Austria, where the Kremsmünster observatory is located	MPC · 6457
6458 Nouda	1992 TD_{1}	Tadasuke Nouda (1901–1989), Japanese astronomer Src	MPC · 6458
6459 Hidesan	1992 UY_{5}	Hideo Sato (born 1940), Japanese astronomer	MPC · 6459
6460 Bassano	1992 UK_{6}	Bassano Bresciano, an ancient village in northern Italy, where the Bassano Bresciano Observatory is located	MPC · 6460
6461 Adam	1993 VB_{5}	Robert Adam (1728–1792), a Scottish architect	JPL · 6461
6462 Myougi	1994 AF_{2}	Mount Myougi, 1104 m above sea level, one of the "Three Jomo Mountains" was created by volcanic activity. It is located at the southwestern part of Gunma prefecture, Japan.	JPL · 6462
6463 Isoda	1994 AG_{3}	Sachiko Isoda (1912–1993), a Japanese astronomer who joined the Tokyo Astronomical Observatory in 1943	MPC · 6463
6464 Kaburaki	1994 CK	Masaki Kaburaki (1902–1987), a professor of astronomy at the University of Tokyo until 1963	MPC · 6464
6465 Zvezdotchet	1995 EP	Zvezdotchet ("Stargazer"), a Russian magazine for amateur astronomers	MPC · 6465
6466 Drewesquivel	1979 MU_{8}	Drew Esquivel (1995–2016), a devoted student, mentor, leader, and outstanding athlete on wrestling and swimming teams, enjoyed sharing his skills and passion for software development with his peers at MIT and the Summer Science Program, and with the community at large via mobile applications and online tutoring.	JPL · 6466
6467 Prilepina	1979 TS_{2}	Svetlana Semenovna Prilepina, a Russian astronomer who graduate at the Ural State University. She has been organizing the annual Winter Astronomical School at the Kourovka Astronomical Observatory.	MPC · 6467
6468 Welzenbach	1981 ED_{19}	Linda Welzenbach (born 1966), American geologist, Collection Manager of the Meteorite Collection of the National Museum of Natural History	JPL · 6468
6469 Armstrong	1982 PC	Neil Armstrong (1930–2012), American astronaut and first person to walk on the Moon with the Apollo 11	MPC · 6469
6470 Aldrin	1982 RO_{1}	Buzz Aldrin (born 1930), American astronaut and second person to walk on the Moon with the Apollo 11	MPC · 6470
6471 Collins	1983 EB_{1}	Michael Collins (1930–2021), American astronaut of the Apollo 11 mission	MPC · 6471
6472 Rosema	1985 TL	Keith D. Rosema (born 1967), computer scientist at the Jet Propulsion Laboratory who did asteroid radar astronomy at both Arecibo and Goldstone Observatory	MPC · 6472
6473 Winkler	1986 GM	Ron Winkler (born 1954), American digital engineer and radio astronomer at Goldstone Observatory	MPC · 6473
6474 Choate	1987 SG_{1}	Dennis Choate (born 1952), senior engineer at NASA's Goldstone Observatory	MPC · 6474
6475 Refugium	1987 SZ_{6}	Latin word for "refuge"	MPC · 6475
6478 Gault	1988 JC_{1}	Donald Gault (1923–1999), an American planetary geologist and giant in the field of impact cratering processes, who applied his understanding and insight as an experimentalist to interpreting impact data and its application to the Moon, the Earth, Mars and Mercury. His work is at the heart of the most basic of all processes concerned with solid bodies in the Solar System.	JPL · 6478
6479 Leoconnolly	1988 LC	Leo P. Connolly, American astronomer and teacher at California State University	MPC · 6479
6480 Scarlatti	1988 PM_{1}	Domenico Scarlatti (1685–1757), Italian composer and instrumentalist	MPC · 6480
6481 Tenzing	1988 RH_{2}	Tenzing Norgay (known as Sherpa Tenzing, 1914–1986), a Nepali-Indian Sherpa mountaineer who reached the summit of Mount Everest with Edmund Hillary in 1953	MPC · 6481
6482 Steiermark	1989 AF_{7}	The state of Styria in southeast Austria	MPC · 6482
6483 Nikolajvasilʹev	1990 EO_{4}	Nikolaj Vasilʹev, Russian scientific director of the Interdisciplinary Independent Tunguska Expeditions Src	MPC · 6483
6484 Barthibbs	1990 FT_{1}	Bart Hibbs, American physicist and long-time acquaintance of the discoverer Eleanor Helin	MPC · 6484
6485 Wendeesther	1990 UR_{1}	Wendee Esther Wallach-Feldman (afterwards Wendee Wallach-Levy), former teacher. Married to astronomer David H. Levy with whom she co-directs their private observatory (Jarnac Observatory) in Vail, Arizona	MPC · 6485
6486 Anitahill	1991 FO	Anita Hill, (born 1956) American lawyer, academic and human rights advocate. She became a national figure in 1991 when she accused U.S. Supreme Court nominee Clarence Thomas, her supervisor at the United States Department of Education and the Equal Employment Opportunity Commission, of sexual harassment and inspired generations of women to speak out against harassment.	MPC · 6486
6487 Tonyspear	1991 GA_{1}	Tony Spear, American engineer, latterly of the Jet Propulsion Laboratory	MPC · 6487
6488 Drebach	1991 GU_{9}	Drebach Observatory (113) and planetarium in Germany	MPC · 6488
6489 Golevka	1991 JX	The international collaboration of the Goldstone Observatory, Yevpatoria and Kashima Space Communication Center	MPC · 6489
6493 Cathybennett	1992 CA	Catherine A. Bennett, who was instrumental for the establishment of a successful NEO detection system at JPL	MPC · 6493
6496 Kazuko	1992 UG_{2}	Kazuko Ōtsuka (born 1934), Japanese Astronomer at the Tokyo Astronomical Observatory since 1957	MPC · 6496
6497 Yamasaki	1992 UR_{3}	Masamitsu Yamasaki (1886–1959), Japanese astronomer Src	MPC · 6497
6498 Ko	1992 UJ_{4}	Ko Nagasawa (born 1932), worker at the University of Tokyo's Earthquake Research Institute and the Public Information Office at the National Astronomical Observatory of Japan.	MPC · 6498
6499 Michiko	1992 UV_{6}	Michiko Hirasawa (born 1955), wife of the co-discoverer Masanori Hirasawa	JPL · 6499
6500 Kodaira	1993 ET	Keiichi Kodaira (born 1937), Japanese astronomer and (first) scientific director of the Subaru Telescope on Hawaii	MPC · 6500

== 6501–6600 ==
back to top

Named minor planet	Provisional	This minor planet was named for...	Ref · Catalog
6501 Isonzo	1993 XD	The river Soča (Italian: Isonzo). The Italian village of Farra d'Isonzo and its Farra d'Isonzo Observatory (595) are located nearby.	MPC · 6501
6504 Lehmbruck	4630 P-L	Wilhelm Lehmbruck (1881–1919), German sculptor	MPC · 6504
6505 Muzzio	1976 AH	Juan Carlos Muzzio (born 1946), Argentine astrophysicist and a discoverer of minor planets	JPL · 6505
6506 Klausheide	1978 EN	Klaus Heide (born 1938), German meteorite and tektite researcher at the University of Jena	MPC · 6506
6508 Rolčík	1982 QM	Viktor Rolčík (1884–1954), Czech optician and telescope maker	MPC · 6508
6509 Giovannipratesi	1983 CQ_{3}	Giovanni Pratesi (born 1963) is a mineralogist and specialist in meteorites and impact rocks. He is director of the Museum of Natural History of the University of Firenze and was the founder and director of the Museum of Planetary Sciences in Prato until 2012.	JPL · 6509
6510 Tarry	1987 DF	William and Nancy Tarry, Americans stationed in Alice Springs, Australia, who provided hospitality and assistance to the Shoemakers when Eugene was killed in an outback car collision	JPL · 6510
6511 Furmanov	1987 QR	Rudol'f Davidovich Furmanov (born 1938), Russian producer and artist from Saint Petersburg, Russia	MPC · 6511
6512 de Bergh	1987 SR	Catherine de Bergh (born 1945), French planetary scientist at the Paris Observatory who has studied the chemistry of the giant and terrestrial planets. She also studied in the icy surfaces of Io, Triton and Pluto.	MPC · 6512
6514 Torahiko	1987 WY	Torahiko Terada (1878–1935), Japanese physicist and author	MPC · 6514
6515 Giannigalli	1988 MG	Gianni Galli (born 1963), Italian amateur astronomer	JPL · 6515
6516 Gruss	1988 TC	Gustav Gruss (1854–1922), Czech astronomer	MPC · 6516
6517 Buzzi	1990 BW	Luca Buzzi (born 1982), Italian amateur astronomer and discoverer of minor planets	JPL · 6517
6518 Vernon	1990 FR	Robert and Esther Vernon, longtime friends and, for more than 35 years, neighbors of the discoverer and her parents, Fred and Kay Francis. Their wise counsel, advice and solace over the years have been a source of comfort and renewed strength. Bob, now "retired", travels the world from Slovakia to Mongolia, sharing his wealth of experience and expertise with emerging democracies	JPL · 6518
6519 Giono	1991 CX	Jean Giono (1895–1970), French writer	MPC · 6519
6520 Sugawa	1991 HH	Chikara Sugawa (1916–), Japanese astronomer with the International Latitude Observatory in Mizusawa	MPC · 6520
6521 Pina	1991 LC_{1}	Pina Toscano Blanco, regular "accompanying person" at astronomical meetings during the last 25 years. Her continuous presence has made her a supporting member of the "wives' committees" that do so much to improve such meetings. Name suggested by Pina's husband, Carlo Blanco, with the blessing of the discoverer	JPL · 6521
6522 Aci	1991 NQ	The Jaci (Aci), a river southeast of Mount Etna, Italy. The name also honors the many towns and villages along it that contain the name: Acicastello, Acitrezza, Acireale, Acibonaccorsi, Acicatena, Aci Sant'Antonio and Aci Santo Filippo. The modern-day river evokes the myth of Aci (or Acis), the young Sicilian shepherd who was in love with Galatea, a Nereid. The jealous cyclops Polyphemus hurled a large rock and killed Aci, whose blood was transformed into an underground river that plunged into the Ionian Sea to hug his beloved Galatea. Name proposed by the discoverer, following a suggestion by Carlo Blanco	JPL · 6522
6523 Clube	1991 TC	Victor Clube (born 1934), English astrophysicist and planetary scientist	MPC · 6523
6524 Baalke	1992 AO	Ron Baalke, American software engineer at JPL	MPC · 6524
6525 Ocastron	1992 SQ	Orange County Astronomers, a public non-profit organization in southern California	MPC · 6525
6526 Matogawa	1992 TY	Yasunori Matogawa (born 1942), Japanese rocket engineer at the Institute of Space and Astronautical Science in Tokyo	MPC · 6526
6527 Takashiito	1992 UF_{6}	Takashi Ito (born 1967) is a Japanese planetary scientist who specializes in solar-system dynamics, particularly concerning minor planets. One of his major achievements was to confirm numerically that asymmetric lunar cratering has a profound connection with near-Earth-asteroid dynamics	JPL · 6527
6528 Boden	1993 FL	Boden Municipality, Sweden, birthplace of astronomer Mats Lindgren, who co-discovered this minor planet	MPC · 6528
6529 Rhoads	1993 XR	R. Rhoads Stephenson, mechanical engineer and deputy director at JPL	MPC · 6529
6530 Adry	1994 GW	Adriano Casulli (born 1974), son of astronomer Vincenzo Silvano Casulli who discovered this minor planet	JPL · 6530
6531 Subashiri	1994 YY	Subashiri, part of Oyama town at the foot of Mount Fuji, Japan	MPC · 6531
6532 Scarfe	1995 AC	Colin D. Scarfe (born 1940), Canadian astronomer and professor of astronomy at the University of Victoria †	MPC · 6532
6533 Giuseppina	1995 DM	Josephine Hergenrother (born 1949), mother of American astronomer Carl W. Hergenrother who discovered this minor planet	MPC · 6533
6534 Carriepeterson	1995 DT_{1}	Carolyn (Carrie) H. Peterson (1942–2006) was an active member of the Astronomical Society of Southern New England (ASSNE).	JPL · 6534
6535 Archipenko	3535 P-L	Alexander Archipenko (1887–1964) Ukrainian-born American sculptor and avant-garde artist	MPC · 6535
6536 Vysochinska	1977 NK	Lyudmila Iosifovna Vysochinska, composer, pianist and music critic in Kyiv and a public figure throughout Ukraine. She has written many songs based on the poetry of Ukrainian, Russian and Bulgarian poets. The founding director of Ukraine's first Theater of Songs, she has research interests that include the connections between Ukrainian classical composers and writers	JPL · 6536
6537 Adamovich	1979 QK	Ales Adamovich (1927–1994), Belarusian-Russian writer and a critic	MPC · 6537
6538 Muraviov	1981 SA	Mikhail Nikitich Muraviov (1757–1807), Russian poet, minister, and administrator of Moscow State University, where he inaugurated the department of astronomy and built the observatory	JPL · 6538
6539 Nohavica	1982 QG	Jaromír Nohavica (born 1953), Czech singer, poet and composer	MPC · 6539
6540 Stepling	1982 SL	Joseph Stepling (1716–1778), Czech Jesuit astronomer who founded the astronomical observatory at the Jesuit college in Prague	MPC · 6540
6541 Yuan	1984 DY	Dah-Ning Yuan (born 1956), a senior scientist at the Jet Propulsion Laboratory, has been a key contributor to the determination of the earth's gravity field using the ultra precise spacecraft-to-spacecraft ranging data from the twin GRACE spacecraft	JPL · 6541
6542 Jacquescousteau	1985 CH	Jacques-Yves Cousteau (1910–1997), French marine explorer	MPC · 6542
6543 Senna	1985 TP	Ayrton Senna (1960–1994), Brazilian Formula One racing driver	MPC · 6543
6544 Stevendick	1986 SD	Steven J. Dick (born 1949), president of IAU Commission 41 (1997–2000), wrote the official history of the U.S. Naval Observatory and books on the history of the extraterrestrial life debate. At the USNO (1979–2003) he was astronomer, historian and Nautical Almanac Office chief. He has been chief historian of NASA since 2003	JPL · 6544
6545 Leitus	1986 TR_{6}	Leitus, an Argonaut from Greek mythology. He was one of the seven Achaean Leaders in front of whom Poseidon appeared during the Trojans' attack on the Greek armada, urging them to fight back instead of acting like cowards. Wounded by Hector, Leitus was one of the few to safely return home after the Trojan War.	IAU · 6545
6546 Kaye	1987 DY	Danny Kaye (1911–1987), American actor and comedian	MPC · 6546
6547 Vasilkarazin	1987 RO	Vasilij Nazarovich Karazin (1773-1842), Russian/Ukrainian scientist, founder of the University of Kharkov which now bears his name	MPC · 6547
6548 Maxalexander	1988 BO_{4}	Max Alexander, New Zealand photographer.	IAU · 6548
6549 Skryabin	1988 PX	Alexander Scriabin (1872–1915), Russian composer	MPC · 6549
6550 Parléř	1988 VO	Peter Parler (1333–1399), German-Bohemian architect and sculptor	MPC · 6550
6552 Higginson	1989 GH	George Higginson (1999–2009), of Lancaster, England, killed tragically in a road accident, was a promising student and budding astronomer. The name was suggested by M. A. Thompson	JPL · 6552
6553 Seehaus	1989 GP_{6}	Paul A. Seehaus (1891–1919), German painter	MPC · 6553
6554 Takatsuguyoshida	1989 UO	Takatsugu Yoshida (born 1951), Japanese amateur astronomer	MPC · 6554
6556 Arcimboldo	1989 YS	Giuseppe Arcimboldo (1527–1593), Italian painter	MPC · 6556
6557 Yokonomura	1990 VR	Yōko Nomura (born 1950), wife of Japanese amateur astronomer Toshiro Nomura who co-discovered this minor planet	MPC · 6557
6558 Norizuki	1991 GZ	Sōjirō Norizuki (1912–1995), Japanese telescope builder who constructed the first parabolic antenna for solar observations in Japan in 1949	MPC · 6558
6559 Nomura	1991 JP	Toshiro Nomura (born 1954), Japanese science teacher, amateur astronomer and discoverer of minor planets	MPC · 6559
6560 Pravdo	1991 NP	Steven H. Pravdo, American astronomer and co-investigator of the Near-Earth Asteroid Tracking	MPC · 6560
6561 Gruppetta	1991 TC_{4}	John M. Gruppetta (born 1957), a long-time friend of the discoverer, is a design engineer with an interest in astronomy	JPL · 6561
6562 Takoyaki	1991 VR	Takoyaki, Japanese fast food	MPC · 6562
6563 Steinheim	1991 XZ_{5}	The Steinheim crater in southwest Germany. It is approximately 15 million years old and measures 4 kilometers in diameter.	MPC · 6563
6564 Asher	1992 BB	David J. Asher (born 1966), British astronomer and discoverer of minor planets	MPC · 6564
6565 Reiji	1992 FT	Leiji Matsumoto (1938-2023), Japanese manga artist	MPC · 6565
6566 Shafter	1992 UB_{2}	Allen Shafter (born 1955), American professor and chairman of studies in astronomy at San Diego State University	JPL · 6566
6567 Shigemasa	1992 WS	Shigemasa Suzuki (1920–), a Japanese engineer and radiophysicist	MPC · 6567
6568 Serendip	1993 DT	Serendip (Sri Lanka) is one of the names of Sri Lanka. The old Persian name id used in the fairy tale The Three Princes of Serendip, whose heroes are always making discoveries of things they were not seeking.	JPL · 6568
6569 Ondaatje	1993 MO	Michael Ondaatje (born 1943), Sri Lanka-born Canadian novelist, poet and writer, best known for his novel The English Patient	JPL · 6569
6570 Tomohiro	1994 JO	Tomohiro Hirayama (born 1938), Japanese astronomer and software engineer	MPC · 6570
6571 Sigmund	3027 P-L	Peter Sigmund (born 1936), a Danish physicist at Odense University in Denmark University	MPC · 6571
6572 Carson	1938 SX	Rachel Carson (1907–1964), an American marine biologist, conservationist and author, known for her book Silent Spring	MPC · 6572
6573 Magnitskij	1974 SK_{1}	Leontij Filippovich Magnitskij (1669–1739), a teacher of mathematics at the School of Mathematical and Navigation Sciences in Moscow from 1701, was author of the first printed book in Russia on "arithmetics", an encyclopedia of mathematical and astronomical knowledge at that time	JPL · 6573
6574 Gvishiani	1976 QE_{1}	Jermen Mikhailovich Gvishiani (born 1928), known for his many works in philosophy, sociology and theory of management. He serves as president of the Foundation for Prospective Research and the Moscow Institute of Economics, Politics and Law. He is a member of the Russian Academy of Sciences, the Rome Club and many foreign academies, foundations and associations. His work promotes the use of foreign achievements in science, technology and culture in present-day Russia	JPL · 6574
6575 Slavov	1978 PJ_{2}	Nikolaj Antonovich Slavov (born 1926), Ukrainian river fleet engineer and sportsman. He helped lead the clean-up effort after the 1986 disaster at Chernobyl, where he had been working for several months. A national boxing champion, he is president of the Professional Boxing League of Ukraine. His interests extend to the arts, and he is president of the All-Ukrainian Foundation for the artist Leonid Bykov. He actively contributes to the development of culture and sport in Ukraine	JPL · 6575
6576 Kievtech	1978 RK	The Kiev Polytechnic Institute (Igor Sikorsky Kyiv Polytechnic Institute)	MPC · 6576
6577 Torbenwolff	1978 VB_{6}	Torben Wolff (born 1919) is a Danish marine biologist who participated in the Galathea Deep-Sea Expedition Round the World (1950–1952) and other major ocean expeditions.	MPC · 6577
6578 Zapesotskij	1980 TQ	Alexander Sergeevich Zapesotskij (born 1954), Russian culturologist and sociologist	MPC · 6578
6579 Benedix	1981 ES_{4}	Gretchen K. Benedix (born 1968), British curator of meteorites at the Natural History Museum in London	JPL · 6579
6580 Philbland	1981 EW_{21}	Philip A. Bland (born 1969), British planetologist and meteoriticist	JPL · 6580
6581 Sobers	1981 SO	Garfield Sobers (born 1936), West Indies cricketer	MPC · 6581
6582 Flagsymphony	1981 VS	The Flagstaff Symphony Orchestra is celebrating its 50th season in 1999–2000. It is considered by many to be the best symphony orchestra in a small community in the U.S.A	JPL · 6582
6583 Destinn	1984 DE	Ema Destinn (1878–1930), Czech opera singer	MPC · 6583
6584 Luděkpešek	1984 FK	Luděk Pešek (1919–1999), Czech astronomical artist and novelist	MPC · 6584
6585 O'Keefe	1984 SR	John A. O'Keefe, American astronomer, geodesist, and researcher in meteoritics †	MPC · 6585
6586 Seydler	1984 UK	August Seydler (1849–1891), Czech astronomer	MPC · 6586
6587 Brassens	1984 WA	Georges Brassens (1921–1981), French singer and poet	MPC · 6587
6589 Jankovich	1985 SL_{3}	Milan Jankovich, economist and ecologist in Monaco, is head of the Zepter company. He is devoted to helping young people, improving the environment and encouraging cultural advances. He has won many prestigious international prizes. The name was suggested by the Ukrainian Ecological Academy of Sciences	JPL · 6589
6590 Barolo	1985 TA	Barolo, a winegrowing area in Piedmont, Italy	MPC · 6590
6591 Sabinin	1986 RT	Dmitry Sabinin (1889–1951), Russian botanist at Moscow State University	MPC · 6591
6592 Goya	1986 TB	Francisco Goya (1746–1828), Spanish painter named on the 250th anniversary of his birth	MPC · 6592
6594 Tasman	1987 MM	Abel Tasman (1603–1659), Dutch explorer	MPC · 6594
6595 Munizbarreto	1987 QZ	Luiz Muniz Barreto, Brazilian astronomer and director of the National Observatory in Rio de Janeiro	MPC · 6595
6596 Bittner	1987 VC	Adam Bittner (1777–1844), Czech astronomer and fifth director of the Klementinum observatory in Prague	MPC · 6596
6597 Kreil	1988 AF	Karl Kreil (1798–1862), Austrian astronomer and meteorologist	MPC · 6597
6598 Modugno	1988 CL	Domenico Modugno (1928–1994), an Italian singer, songwriter and actor	MPC · 6598
6599 Tsuko	1988 PV	Tsukō Nakamura (born 1943), Japanese astronomer at the National Astronomical Observatory of Japan	MPC · 6599
6600 Qwerty	1988 QW	The Qwerty standard Roman-alphabet typewriter keyboard (named after the first six of the top row of letters), in part because the provisional designation was QW	JPL · 6600

== 6601–6700 ==
back to top

Named minor planet	Provisional	This minor planet was named for...	Ref · Catalog
6601 Schmeer	1988 XK_{1}	Patrick Schmeer (born 1964) is an amateur astronomer observing cataclysmic variable stars from Saarbruecken-Bischmisheim, Germany. He detected the 1999 eruption of the recurrent nova U Sco and a number of rare dwarf nova outbursts, and he has identified several putative dwarf novae as minor planets.	JPL · 6601
6602 Gilclark	1989 EC	Gilbert A. Clark, American creator of the "Telescopes in Education" (TIE) program (also see 6695 Barrettduff)	MPC · 6602
6603 Marycragg	1990 KG	Mary A. Cragg (born 1938) developed the Telescopes in Education (TIE) office infrastructure. It is used as a model for other remote educational telescope operations	JPL · 6603
6604 Ilias	1990 QE	The Iliad, Homer's ancient Greek epic poem about the Trojan War	MPC · 6604
6605 Carmontelle	1990 SM_{9}	Louis de Carmontelle (1717–1806), a French painter and architect	JPL · 6605
6606 Makino	1990 UF	Tomitaro Makino (1862–1957), Japanese botanist	MPC · 6606
6607 Matsushima	1991 UL	Kōichi Matsushima (born 1938), Japanese astronomer at the National Aerospace Laboratory of Japan	MPC · 6607
6608 Davidecrespi	1991 VC_{4}	Davide Crespi (born 1970), Italian amateur astronomer at the Suno Observatory (147)	JPL · 6608
6610 Burwitz	1993 BL_{3}	Vadim Burwitz (born 1965), German astronomer at the Max Planck Institute for Extraterrestrial Physics	JPL · 6610
6612 Hachioji	1994 EM	The Japanese city of Hachiōji, near Tokyo, is the birthplace of astronomer Yoshio Kushida, who co-discovered this minor planet	MPC · 6612
6613 Williamcarl	1994 LK	William Carl Hergenrother (born 1946) is the father of American astronomer Carl W. Hergenrother, who discovered this minor planet	JPL · 6613
6614 Antisthenes	6530 P-L	Antisthenes (c. 445–365 BC), Greek philosopher, founder of the Cynic school of philosophy	MPC · 6614
6615 Plutarchos	9512 P-L	Plutarch (c. AD 46–120), Greek historian, biographer, and essayist	MPC · 6615
6616 Plotinos	1175 T-1	Plotinus (205–270), Greek philosopher and founder of the neo-Platonic philosophy Neoplatonism	MPC · 6616
6617 Boethius	2218 T-1	Boethius (c. 480–524), Roman senator, consul, philosopher and Christian theologian	MPC · 6617
6618 Jimsimons	1936 SO	Jim Simons (born 1938), an American mathematician and philanthropist.	JPL · 6618
6619 Kolya	1973 SS	Nikolai Chernykh (1931–2004), Russian astronomer and discoverer of minor planets	JPL · 6619
6620 Peregrina	1973 UC	Peregrina ("Pilgrim") is a foreign lady, especially one on pilgrimage. The minor planets might be compared to an immense, multifarious crowd of perpetual pilgrims, and this one fancied to be an especially earnest, devout member.	JPL · 6620
6621 Timchuk	1975 VN_{5}	Evdokiya Ivanovna Timchuk (born 1937), a neuropathologist and physician at a hospital near Simferopol on the Crimean peninsula. She is a good friend of the discoverer Tamara Smirnova.	JPL · 6621
6622 Matvienko	1978 RG_{1}	Vladimir Pavlovich Matvienko (born 1938), Ukrainian economist, author of many works on economics and banking and a member of the Ukrainian Academy of Ecological Sciences. He is also a poet, and some of his poetic works have been set to music	JPL · 6622
6623 Trioconbrio	1979 MY_{2}	Trio con Brio Copenhagen is the leading music ensemble in Denmark. The trio was formed in 1999 and consists of Jens Elvekjaer (piano), Soo-Kyung Hong (cello), and Soo-Jin Hong (violin). In addition to their explorations of the core piano trio repertoire, they have won acclaim for their advocacy of contemporary music.	JPL · 6623
6625 Nyquist	1981 EX_{41}	Laurence E. Nyquist (born 1939), American planetary scientist	JPL · 6625
6626 Mattgenge	1981 EZ_{46}	Matthew Genge (born 1968), British planetary scientist and meteoriticist at Imperial College, London	JPL · 6626
6628 Dondelia	1981 WA_{1}	Donald and Delia West, English friends of the discoverer Edward L. G. Bowell	MPC · 6628
6629 Kurtz	1982 UP	Paul Kurtz (1925–2012), American professor of philosophy and scientific skeptic of the State University of New York Src	MPC · 6629
6630 Skepticus	1982 VA	The Committee for the Scientific Investigation of Claims of the Paranormal (CSICOP), a prominent organization of skeptics Src	MPC · 6630
6631 Pyatnitskij	1983 RQ	Mitrofan Pyatnitsky (1864–1927), Russian musician and gatherer of folk-songs	MPC · 6631
6632 Scoon	1984 UX_{1}	George E. N. Scoon (born 1936), Grenadian-born who worked at ESA's Future Scientific Project Division	MPC · 6632
6635 Zuber	1987 SH	Maria Zuber (born 1958), American geophysicist and planetary geologist	JPL · 6635
6636 Kintanar	1988 RK_{8}	Roman Kintanar (1929–2007), Filipino meteorologist, director of PAGASA, the Philippine Atmospheric, Geophysical and Astronomical Services Administration	JPL · 6636
6637 Inoue	1988 XZ	Keisuke Inoue (1928–), Japanese astronomer	MPC · 6637
6639 Marchis	1989 SO_{8}	Franck Marchis (born 1973), French astronomer and planetary scientist	JPL · 6639
6640 Falorni	1990 DL	Marco Falorni (1944–1995), Italian amateur astronomer and president of the Italian association of amateur astronomers	MPC · 6640
6641 Bobross	1990 OK_{2}	Robert Ross (born 1920) has devoted his life to the Muscular Dystrophy Association for almost 50 years. Now senior vice president and executive director, Ross has built the MDA into a world-famous organization funding research and opening new avenues for the care of patients and their families	JPL · 6641
6642 Henze	1990 UE_{3}	Martin Henze (born 1981), German astronomer at the Max Planck Institute for Extraterrestrial Physics	JPL · 6642
6643 Morikubo	1990 VZ	Shigeru Morikubo (1913–), Japanese amateur astronomer and observer of variable stars, sunspots, meteors and occultations.	MPC · 6643
6644 Jugaku	1991 AA	Jun Jugaku (1927–), Japanese astronomer and professor at Tokai University and the Tokyo Astronomical Observatory	MPC · 6644
6645 Arcetri	1991 AR_{1}	The Italian Arcetri Observatory (030) was moved in 1872 from the center of the city to Arcetri, near the house in which Galileo died. The original observatory, La Specola, was also associated with Galileo, and nineteenth-century directors included the comet hunters Pons, Donati and Tempel. It was Donati who moved the observatory to its present location.	JPL · 6645
6646 Churanta	1991 CA_{3}	Antonina Mikhailovna Churyumova (1907–2003) is the mother of astronomer Klim Churyumov. A poet who has participated actively in public issues in Ukraine, she has seven other children	JPL · 6646
6647 Josse	1991 GG	Raymond Josse (1914–), friend of Belgian astronomer Eric Walter Elst, who discovered this minor planet	MPC · 6647
6649 Yokotatakao	1991 RN	Takao Yokota (born 1956), Japanese systems engineer and amateur astronomer	MPC · 6649
6650 Morimoto	1991 RS	Masaki Morimoto (born 1932), Japanese radio astronomer	MPC · 6650
6651 Rogervenable	1991 RV_{9}	Roger Venable (born 1950) is a physician specializing in primary care and emergency medicine. He is Coordinator of Mars Section of Association of Lunar and Planetary Observers, and Vice President of International Occultation Timing Association. Roger has published articles on the atmosphere of Mars.	IAU · 6651
6653 Feininger	1991 XR_{1}	Lyonel Feininger (1871–1956), a German-American expressionist painter	MPC · 6653
6654 Luleå	1992 DT	The Luleå Municipality in northern Sweden and seat of Norrbotten County	MPC · 6654
6655 Nagahama	1992 EL	The Japanese city of Nagahama, located in the northeastern part of Shiga prefecture	MPC · 6655
6656 Yokota	1992 FF	Hiroshi Yokota (1927–), Japanese amateur astronomer	MPC · 6656
6657 Otukyo	1992 WY	The Japanese city of Otukyo, now Ōtsu, briefly served as the capital of Japan in the 7th century	MPC · 6657
6658 Akiraabe	1992 WT	Akira Abe (born 1934), Japanese editor of the astronomical magazine Hoshino Techo ("Star Handbook")	MPC · 6658
6659 Pietsch	1992 YN	Wolfgang Pietsch (born 1948), German astronomer at the Max Planck Institute for Extraterrestrial Physics	JPL · 6659
6660 Matsumoto	1993 BC	Tatsujiro Matsumoto (born 1930), Japanese telescope maker and observer of Mars and Jupiter	MPC · 6660
6661 Ikemura	1993 BO	Toshihiko Ikemura (born 1952), a Japanese communications technician and amateur astronomer who co-discovered comet 76P/West–Kohoutek–Ikemura in March 1975. He has also endeavored to observe the planets photographically and independently made a map of Mars that is used by many observers.	MPC · 6661
6663 Tatebayashi	1993 CC	The Japanese city of Tatebayashi, located in the eastern part of Gunma Prefecture	MPC · 6663
6664 Tennyo	1993 CK	Tennyō, a female heavenly messenger and spiritual being in Japanese Buddhism	MPC · 6664
6665 Kagawa	1993 CN	Tetsuo Kagawa (born 1969), Japanese astronomer at Gekko Observatory (888). He is a discoverer of minor planets.	MPC · 6665
6666 Frö	1993 FG	Freyr (Frö), from Norse mythology, is the god of fertility and son of Njord	MPC · 6666
6667 Sannaimura	1994 EK	The Japanese village of Sannai (Sannaimura) is located in the Akita Prefecture. In Japanese, Sannai means "in the mountains" and mura means "village".	MPC · 6667
6669 Obi	1994 JA	Shinya Obi (1925–), Japanese astronomer, professor at the University of Tokyo, and author of popular astronomy books	MPC · 6669
6670 Wallach	1994 LL_{1}	Annette and Leonard Wallach, American creators of "Treasure Island", a day camp and school on Long Island in New York	MPC · 6670
6671 Concari	1994 NC_{1}	Paolo Concari (born 1978), an Italian amateur astronomer and observer of minor planets from Suno in Novara. The name was suggested by Sergio Foglia.	JPL · 6671
6672 Corot	1213 T-1	Jean-Baptiste-Camille Corot (1796–1875), French painter	MPC · 6672
6673 Degas	2246 T-1	Edgar Degas (1834–1917), French painter and sculptor	MPC · 6673
6674 Cézanne	4272 T-1	Paul Cézanne (1839–1906), French painter	MPC · 6674
6675 Sisley	1493 T-2	Alfred Sisley (1839–1899), French (of English descent) impressionist painter	MPC · 6675
6676 Monet	2083 T-2	Claude Monet (1840–1926), French painter	MPC · 6676
6677 Renoir	3045 T-3	Pierre-Auguste Renoir (1841–1919), French painter	MPC · 6677
6678 Seurat	3422 T-3	Georges Seurat (1859–1891), French painter	MPC · 6678
6679 Gurzhij	1969 UP	Andrei Nikolaevich Gurzhii (born 1946), Ukrainian specialist in information measurement and author of several text books	MPC · 6679
6681 Prokopovich	1972 RU	Feofan Prokopovich (1681–1736), Ukrainian and Russian writer	MPC · 6681
6682 Makarij	1973 ST	Macarius, Metropolitan of Moscow (1482–1563), Russian cleric, writer, and icon painter. In 1542, he became Metropolitan of Moscow and all Russia.	MPC · 6682
6683 Karachentsov	1976 GQ_{2}	Nikolaj Petrovich Karachentsov is an actor and singer at the Moscow Lenkom Theatre. As one review said, "He has a remarkable sense of rhythm and an exceptional voice, captivating audiences with his songs"	JPL · 6683
6684 Volodshevchenko	1977 QU	Volodymyr Shevchenko (1929–1987), Ukrainian film director who died as a result of exposure to radiation while filming at the Chernobyl disaster	MPC · 6684
6685 Boitsov	1978 QG_{2}	Vasilij Vasil'evich Boitsov (Bojtsov, 1908–1997), specialist on the technology of mechanical engineering and standardization. From 1963 to 1984 he headed the U.S.S.R. State Committee for standards and represented his country in the International Organization for Standardization, of which he served as president (1977–1979). Boitsov was an initiator and active participant in fundamental research on the creation of standard measurement systems. Name suggested by the Institute of Theoretical Astronomy and supported by the discoverer	JPL · 6685
6686 Hernius	1979 QC	Olof Hernius, Swedish astronomer with UESAC, the Uppsala–ESO Survey of Asteroids and Comets	MPC · 6686
6687 Lahulla	1980 FN	José Felix Lahulla, Spanish astronomer at the Royal Observatory of Madrid–Spanish National Observatory (990)	MPC · 6687
6688 Donmccarthy	1981 ER_{17}	Donald W. McCarthy (born 1948), American astronomer and educator at the University of Arizona. He specializes in infrared astronomy and instrumentation and has been an inspiration to his students and to the hundreds who have participated in his Astronomy Camps.	JPL · 6688
6689 Floss	1981 EQ_{24}	Christine Floss (1961–2018), American meteoriticist at Washington University in St. Louis	JPL · 6689
6690 Messick	1981 SY_{1}	Hank H. Messick (born 1955) first taught the discoverer the constellations	JPL · 6690
6691 Trussoni	1984 DX	Edoardo Trussoni (born 1945) is an astrophysicist who has spent most of his career studying high-energy phenomena in active galactic nuclei and stars. He was director of the Osservatorio Astronomico di Torino from 2002 to 2005. The name was suggested by M. Di Martino	JPL · 6691
6692 Antonínholý	1985 HL	Antonín Holý (1936–2012), Czech chemist and contributor to the development of drugs used in the treatment of HIV and hepatitis B	JPL · 6692
6695 Barrettduff	1986 PD_{1}	Barrett Duff (born 1923) coordinated the formation of the nonprofit, educational outreach organization Telescopes in Education (TIE) Foundation. His efforts were critical to the successful development of the TIE Foundation	JPL · 6695
6696 Eubanks	1986 RC	T. Marshall Eubanks, American astronomer at the United States Naval Observatory	MPC · 6696
6697 Celentano	1987 HM	Adriano Celentano (born 1938), Italian singer and actor	MPC · 6697
6698 Malhotra	1987 SL	Renu Malhotra (born 1961), Indian–American planetary scientist and a discoverer of minor planets	MPC · 6698
6699 Igaueno	1987 YK	The Japanese town Ueno (Iga-Ueno), located in Mie Prefecture	MPC · 6699
6700 Kubišová	1988 AO	Marta Kubišová (born 1942), Czech singer	MPC · 6700

== 6701–6800 ==
back to top

Named minor planet	Provisional	This minor planet was named for...	Ref · Catalog
6701 Warhol	1988 AW	Andy Warhol (1928–1987), American artist and leading figure of the pop art movement	MPC · 6701
6705 Rinaketty	1988 RK_{5}	Rina Ketty (1911–1996), French singer of the 1930s	JPL · 6705
6707 Shigeru	1988 VZ	Shigeru Nakano (born 1918), doctor of medicine specializing in obstetrics and gynecology and in medical jurisprudence	JPL · 6707
6708 Bobbievaile	1989 AA	Bobbie Vaile (1959–1996), Australian astrophysicist	MPC · 6708
6709 Hiromiyuki	1989 CD	Hiroyuki (born 1991) and Miyuki Mori (born 1993), the son and daughter of the second discoverer.	JPL · 6709
6710 Apostel	1989 GF	Leo Apostel, Flemish philosopher	MPC · 6710
6711 Holliman	1989 HG	John Holliman (1948–1998), a national correspondent for CNN, the U.S. Cable News Network.	JPL · 6711
6712 Hornstein	1990 DS	Karl Hornstein (1824–1882), Czech astronomer and 8th director of the Klementinum observatory (Clementinum) in Prague	MPC · 6712
6713 Coggie	1990 KM	Karin "Coggie" Peterson Messina (born 1934), a dedicated music teacher in Massachusetts who has taught over 600 students how to play the flute.	JPL · 6713
6714 Montréal	1990 OE	The Canadian city of Montreal in Quebec	MPC · 6714
6715 Sheldonmarks	1990 QS_{1}	Sheldon Marks (born 1956), a world-renowned urologist and surgeon whose book Prostate and Cancer has helped thousands of men with serious prostate-gland problems.	JPL · 6715
6716 Jacobsen	1990 RO_{1}	Stein Bjornar Jacobsen, Norwegian-American professor of Geochemistry in the Department of Earth and Planetary Sciences at Harvard University.	IAU · 6716
6717 Antal	1990 TU_{10}	Milan Antal (1935–1999), a Slovak astronomer	MPC · 6717
6718 Beiglböck	1990 TT	Wolf D. Beiglböck (born 1939), German mathematician and professor at the University of Heidelberg.	JPL · 6718
6719 Gallaj	1990 UL_{11}	Mark Lazarevich Gallaj (1914–), a Soviet test pilot	MPC · 6719
6720 Gifu	1990 VP	Gifu, Gifu, Japan, the city of 400 000, capital of the prefecture of the same name, site of ancient battlefields and a modern public observatory.	JPL · 6720
6721 Minamiawaji	1990 VY_{6}	Minamiawaji, a small city located in southern Awaji island, Japan.	JPL · 6721
6722 Bunichi	1991 BG	Bunichi Saito (born 1925), professor emeritus at Niigata University and an expert on the earth's upper atmosphere.	JPL · 6722
6723 Chrisclark	1991 CL	Christopher C. Clark, American designer of the Near-Earth Asteroid Tracking camera system at JPL	MPC · 6723
6725 Engyoji	1991 DS	The Engyō-ji temple, located in Himeji, Hyogo prefecture, Japan.	JPL · 6725
6726 Suthers	1991 PS	Paul Graham Sutherland (born 1952) is an amateur astronomer who has been closely involved with the Society for Popular Astronomy.	JPL · 6726
6729 Emiko	1991 VV	Emiko Otomo (born 1963), wife of the discoverer	JPL · 6729
6730 Ikeda	1992 BH	Tetsuro Ikeda (1894–1981), Japanese astronomer and director of the International Latitude Observatory of Mizusawa	MPC · 6730
6731 Hiei	1992 BK	Eijiro Hiei (born 1931), professor at Meisei University and professor emeritus of the National Astronomical Observatory of Japan.	JPL · 6731
6734 Benzenberg	1992 FB	Johann Benzenberg (1777–1846), German physicist and astronomer, founder of the Sternwarte Bilk (Bilk Observatory) at Düsseldorf	JPL · 6734
6735 Madhatter	1992 WM	The Hatter ("The Mad Hatter"), fictional character from Lewis Carroll's Alice's Adventures in Wonderland.	JPL · 6735
6736 Marchare	1993 EF	March Hare, fictional character from Lewis Carroll's Alice's Adventures in Wonderland.	JPL · 6736
6737 Okabayashi	1993 ER	Shigeki Okabayashi (1913–1944), a self-taught Japanese astronomer.	JPL · 6737
6738 Tanabe	1993 FD	Hiroyoshi Tanabe (born 1928), astronomer at the National Astronomical Observatory	JPL · 6738
6739 Tärendö	1993 FU	The Swedish village of Tärendö, located in Norrbotten County	MPC · 6739
6740 Goff	1993 GY	Robert and Valerie Goff, American opticians from Tucson, Arizona	MPC · 6740
6741 Liyuan	1994 FX	Li Yuan (1925–), Chinese science writer and popularizer of astronomy	MPC · 6741
6742 Biandepei	1994 GR	Bian Depei (1926–), Chinese science writer and popularizer of astronomy	MPC · 6742
6743 Liu	1994 GS	Joseph H. C. Liu (born 1931), director of Hong Kong Space Museum	MPC · 6743
6744 Komoda	1994 JL	Kazuyoshi Komoda (1915–1967), amateur astronomer in Japan.	JPL · 6744
6745 Nishiyama	1994 JD	Minewo Nishiyama (born 1925), amateur astronomer and president of the Chikushi Astronomical Association from 1944 to 1947	JPL · 6745
6746 Zagar	1994 NP	Francesco Zagar (1900–1976), Italian astronomer, professor at the University of Milan, director of the Brera Astronomical Observatory ([[List of observatory codes#|]])	MPC · 6746
6747 Ozegahara	1995 UT	Ozegahara, a highland, surrounded by 2000-meter-class mountains, lying astride the three prefectures of Fukushima, Gunma and Niigata.	JPL · 6747
6748 Bratton	1995 UV	Durley H. Bratton ( 1923), who has been a mentor and inspiration for amateur astronomers and telescope makers in the Memphis, Tennessee	JPL · 6748
6749 Ireentje	7068 P-L	Irene van Houten, granddaughter of the Dutch astronomers Cornelis and Ingrid van Houten	MPC · 6749
6750 Katgert	1078 T-1	Peter Katgert (born 1944) and his wife Jet Ketgert-Merkelijn (born 1943), Dutch astronomers at Leiden Observatory	MPC · 6750
6751 van Genderen	1114 T-1	Arnout van Genderen (born 1936), Dutch astronomer	MPC · 6751
6752 Ashley	4150 T-1	Ashley Thomas McDermott, American professor of astronomy at the College of the Desert	MPC · 6752
6753 Fursenko	1974 RV	Margarita Aleksandrovna Fursenko ( 1931), staff member of the Institute of Theoretical Astronomy during 1955–1997	JPL · 6753
6754 Burdenko	1976 UD	Nikolay Burdenko (1876–1946), Russian neurosurgeon	MPC · 6754
6755 Solovʹyanenko	1976 YE	Anatolii Solovyanenko (1932–1999), a Ukrainian singer and People's Artist of the former U.S.S.R.	JPL · 6755
6756 Williamfeldman	1978 VX_{3}	William C. Feldman (born 1940) is the father of planetary neutron spectroscopy. His ingeniously designed instruments found evidence for ice at the lunar poles, Mercury's north pole, and in the high-latitude subsurface of Mars. He is loved for his open and generous collaborations and unrelenting enthusiasm for science.	JPL · 6756
6757 Addibischoff	1979 SE_{15}	Adolf Bischoff (born 1955), German meteoriticist and professor at the Institut für Planetologie, Westfälische Wilhelms-Universität Münster	JPL · 6757
6758 Jesseowens	1980 GL	Jesse Owens (1913–1980), American athlete	MPC · 6758
6761 Haroldconnolly	1981 EV_{19}	Harold C. Connolly (born 1965), American petrologist and meteoriticist	JPL · 6761
6762 Cyrenagoodrich	1981 EC_{25}	Cyrena A. Goodrich (born 1955), American meteoriticist	JPL · 6762
6763 Kochiny	1981 RA_{2}	Nikolaj Egrafovich Kochin (1901–1944) and his wife Pelageya Yakovlevna Kochina (1899–1999), Soviet mathematicians	MPC · 6763
6764 Kirillavrov	1981 TM	Kirill Lavrov (1925–2007), Russian actor	MPC · 6764
6765 Fibonacci	1982 BQ	Fibonacci (c. 1170–1240), Italian mathematician	MPC · 6765
6766 Kharms	1982 UC	Daniil Kharms (1905–1942), Russian author of children's books, absurd short stories, and poetry	MPC · 6766
6767 Shirvindt	1983 AA	Aleksandr Shirvindt (born 1934), Russian actor	MPC · 6767
6768 Mathiasbraun	1983 RY	Matthias Braun (1684–1738), Bohemian sculptor	MPC · 6768
6769 Brokoff	1985 CJ	Jan Brokoff (1652–1718) and Ferdinand Brokoff (1688–1731), father and son Bohemian sculptors	MPC · 6769
6770 Fugate	1985 QR	Robert Q. Fugate (born 1943), of the U.S. Starfire Optical Range (SOR) research laboratory	MPC · 6770
6771 Foerster	1986 EZ	Wilhelm Julius Foerster (1832–1921), German astronomer and discoverer of minor planets	MPC · 6771
6773 Kellaway	1988 LK	Lucy Kellaway (born 1959), British journalist, recipient of the 2006 British Press Award for "Columnist of the Year"	JPL · 6773
6774 Vladheinrich	1988 VH	Vladimír Václav Heinrich (1884–1965), Czech astronomer	MPC · 6774
6775 Giorgini	1989 GJ	Jon D. Giorgini, American software developer and contributor to radar astrometry of minor planets.	JPL · 6775
6776 Dix	1989 GF_{8}	Otto Dix (1891–1969), a German painter and printmaker, best known for depicting the horrors of war	MPC · 6776
6777 Balakirev	1989 SV	Mily Balakirev (1837–1910), Russian composer and pianist	MPC · 6777
6778 Tosamakoto	1989 TX	Makoto Tosa (born 1944), Japanese astronomer and professor at Tohoku University	MPC · 6778
6779 Perrine	1990 DM	Charles Dillon Perrine (1867–1951), American astronomer	MPC · 6779
6780 Borodin	1990 ES	Alexander Borodin (1833–1887), Russian composer and chemist	MPC · 6780
6781 Sheikhumarrkhan	1990 OD	Sheik Umar Khan (or Sheikh Humarr Khan; 1975–2014) was a Sierra Leonean virologist. Over his career, he saved hundreds of lives treating those with Lassa fever. In 2014, he led his nation's fight against a deadly Ebola outbreak, saving even more lives and inspiring others with his bravery.	JPL · 6781
6783 Gulyaev	1990 SO	Yurij Aleksandrovich Gulyaev (1930–1986), a brilliant Russian singer, People's artist of the U.S.S.R.	JPL · 6783
6784 Bogatikov	1990 UN	Yurij Iosifovich Bogatikov (born 1932), a Russian-Ukrainian singer, People's artist of the U.S.S.R.	JPL · 6784
6786 Doudantsutsuji	1991 DT	Doudantsutsuji, the Japanese name for Enkianthus perulatus, an ericaceous deciduous shrub	JPL · 6786
6789 Milkey	1991 RM_{6}	Robert Milkey (born 1944), American executive officer of the American Astronomical Society	JPL · 6789
6790 Pingouin	1991 SF	Pingouin, an Arctic bird, similar to the penguin of Antarctica. The pingouin become extinct in Newfoundland in 1844.	JPL · 6790
6792 Akiyamatakashi	1991 WC	Takashi Akiyama (born 1923), a leader in youth education for many years in Kanaya, Shizuoka.	JPL · 6792
6793 Palazzolo	1991 YE	The Italy city of Palazzolo sull'Oglio in Lombardy	MPC · 6793
6794 Masuisakura	1992 DK	Sakura Masui (born 1968), a Japanese novelist and essayist known for her books about business.	JPL · 6794
6795 Örnsköldsvik	1993 FZ	Örnsköldsvik Municipality Sweden	MPC · 6795
6796 Sundsvall	1993 FH	Sundsvall Municipality Sweden	MPC · 6796
6797 Östersund	1993 FG	Östersund Municipality Sweden	MPC · 6797
6798 Couperin	1993 JK	Louis Couperin (1626–1661), French Baroque composer	MPC · 6798
6799 Citfiftythree	1993 KM	Caltech's class of 1953 on the occasion of its 50th anniversary of graduation and their contributions to physics, engineering, chemistry, biology, geology, astronomy, mathematics and related fields	JPL · 6799
6800 Saragamine	1994 UC	Mount Saragamine, elevation of 1271 meters, located near the discovering observatory in Ehime, Japan	MPC · 6800

== 6801–6900 ==
back to top

Named minor planet	Provisional	This minor planet was named for...	Ref · Catalog
6801 Střekov	1995 UM	Castle near the Ústí nad Labem, in northern Bohemia	MPC · 6801
6802 Černovice	1995 UQ	The Czech town of Černovice in Bohemia	MPC · 6802
6804 Maruseppu	1995 WV	The Japanese town of Maruseppu, located in Monbetsu District on Hokkaidō	MPC · 6804
6805 Abstracta	4600 P-L	The astronomical bibliography Astronomy and Astrophysics Abstracts (AAA), which was founded in 1969	MPC · 6805
6806 Kaufmann	6048 P-L	Horst W. Kaufmann (born 1929), German astronomical optician	MPC · 6806
6807 Brünnow	6568 P-L	Franz Brünnow (1821–1891), German astronomer	MPC · 6807
6808 Plantin	1932 CP	Christophe Plantin (c. 1520–1589), bookbinder, publisher and typographer	MPC · 6808
6809 Sakuma	1938 DM	Seiichi Sakuma (1929–), Japanese amateur astronomer	MPC · 6809
6810 Juanclariá	1969 GC	Juan José Clariá (born 1945), Argentine astronomer at the Argentine National Observatory in Córdoba	JPL · 6810
6811 Kashcheev	1976 QP	Boris Leonidovich Kashcheev (born 1920), Ukrainian astronomer and professor of radioelectronics at Kharkov Technical University	MPC · 6811
6812 Robertnelson	1978 VJ_{8}	Robert M. Nelson (born 1943) has advanced the understanding of spectrophotometric and angular scattering properties of planetary regoliths, served on Voyager and Cassini instrument teams, and was the Project Scientist for Deep Space 1. He is a strong advocate for scientist privacy rights.	JPL · 6812
6813 Amandahendrix	1978 VV_{9}	Amanda Hendrix (born 1968) has used UV spectroscopy to expand our knowledge of icy satellites, the Moon, asteroids, Mars and Io, by revealing surface compositions, weathering processes and radiation products. She was Cassini Deputy Project Scientist, worked on LRO LAMP, and assessed Europa missions.	JPL · 6813
6814 Steffl	1979 MC_{2}	Andrew J. Steffl (born 1977), American astronomer at SwRI. Co-discovered Pluto's moons, Nyx and Hydra, with Max J. Mutchler, from HST images	JPL · 6814
6815 Mutchler	1979 MM_{5}	Max J. Mutchler (born 1965), American astronomer at the Space Telescope Science Institute. Co-discovered Pluto's moons, Nyx and Hydra, with Andrew J. Steffl, from HST images	JPL · 6815
6816 Barbcohen	1981 EB_{28}	Barbara A. Cohen (born 1971), American planetary scientist at the University of New Mexico	JPL · 6816
6817 Pest	1982 BP	Pest, largest and mostly flat part of the city of Budapest, Hungary	MPC · 6817
6818 Sessyu	1983 EM	Sesshū Tōyō (1420-1508), Japanese painter	MPC · 6818
6819 McGarvey	1983 LL	Flora McGarvey Smrekar (1924–1977) had many ambitions and dreamed of pursuing her interests in a satisfying career. She instilled this same goal in her daughter, who became a planetary scientist. Flora faced many obstacles but has finally found a place among the stars	JPL · 6819
6820 Buil	1985 XS	Christian Buil, French astronomer and discoverer of minor planets	MPC · 6820
6821 Ranevskaya	1986 SZ_{1}	Faina Ranevskaya (1896–1984), who was recognized as one of the greatest Soviet actresses	MPC · 6821
6822 Horálek	1986 UO	Petr Horálek (born 1986), a Czech astronomer, astronomy popularizer, passionate photographer, and one of the ESO Photo Ambassadors.	JPL · 6822
6824 Mallory	1988 RE	George Mallory (1886-1924), British mountaineer who took part in the 1924 British Everest Expedition	MPC · 6824
6825 Irvine	1988 TJ	Andrew Irvine (1902–1924), British mountaineer who took part in the 1924 British Everest Expedition	MPC · 6825
6826 Lavoisier	1989 SD	Antoine Lavoisier (1743-1794), French chemist	MPC · 6826
6827 Wombat	1990 SN	The Wombat, a short-legged marsupials that are native to Australia	JPL · 6827
6828 Elbsteel	1990 VC_{1}	Elliot Steel (born 1995), son of British astronomer Duncan Steel who discovered this minor planet	MPC · 6828
6829 Charmawidor	1991 BM	Charles-Marie Widor (1845-1937), French composer	MPC · 6829
6830 Johnbackus	1991 JB_{1}	John Backus (1924–2007), American computer scientist, inventor of FORTRAN	JPL · 6830
6832 Kawabata	1992 FP	Yasunari Kawabata (1899–1972), Japanese novelist	MPC · 6832
6834 Hunfeld	1993 JH	Jan Hunfeld (1934–2009) was a Dutch journalist at Boom-Pers in Meppel, publisher of the Meppeler Courant. In the 1980s and 1990s he edited a weekly science page in the Courant, in which he included news of the activities of the Royal Dutch amateur-astronomy society. The name was suggested by T. Jurriens	JPL · 6834
6835 Molfino	1994 HT_{1}	Alberto Molfino (1906–1977), an Italian wrestler	MPC · 6835
6836 Paranal	1994 PW	Cerro Paranal, a mountain top in Chile and site of ESO's Very Large Telescopes	MPC · 6836
6837 Bressi	1994 XN	Terrence H. Bressi (Terry Bressi), engineer and member of Spacewatch at the Lunar and Planetary Laboratory of the University of Arizona. He has constructed and improved telescopes and equipment for Spacewatch'es minor-planet and comet observations.	MPC · 6837
6838 Okuda	1995 UD	Toyozo Okuda (1908-1983), Japanese astronomer and director of International Latitude Observatory at Mizusawa	MPC · 6838
6839 Ozenuma	1995 WB	Ozegahara (Ozenuma), a swamp west of the Nikko National Park in Japan	MPC · 6839
6841 Gottfriedkirch	2034 P-L	Gottfried Kirch (1639–1710), German astronomer	MPC · 6841
6842 Krosigk	3016 P-L	Baron Bernhard Friedrich von Krosigk (1656–1714), German amateur astronomer	MPC · 6842
6843 Heremon	1975 TC_{6}	Érimón (Heremon), legendary Celtic ruler of Iberia and son of Míl Espáine	MPC · 6843
6844 Shpak	1975 VR_{5}	Vladimir Stepanovich Shpak (born 1909), distinguished technical organic chemist and director of the State Institute of Applied Chemistry in Leningrad (now St. Petersburg) from 1953 to 1977. He was the initiator and organizer of fundamental, scientific and technical investigations of the main organic synthesis processes of new classes of chemical compounds. He has introduced new technologies into the chemical and petrochemical industries. At present he is the chairman of the Northwestern Scientific Board of the Russian Academy of Sciences on burning and the editor-in-chief of the journal Applied Chemistry	JPL · 6844
6845 Mansurova	1976 JG_{2}	Kira Sergeevna Mansurova (1931–1990), an astronomer in Irkutsk known for her observations with the zenith telescope. She was director of the Astronomical Observatory of Irkutsk University for many years and lecturer of astronomy at the university and Pedagogical Institute in Irkutsk. An active popularizer of astronomy, she published a number of works on astrometry and methods of teaching astronomy	JPL · 6845
6846 Kansazan	1976 UG	Kansazan (1748-1827), Japanese philosopher and poet of the Edo era	MPC · 6846
6847 Kunz-Hallstein	1977 RL	Hans Peter Kunz-Hallstein (born 1939), a German lawyer who has been a legal advisor for the European Southern Observatory for more than 20 years. A highlight of his work was the negotiations with the Chilean government over the interpretation, modification and amendment of the ESO-Chile agreement of 1963	JPL · 6847
6848 Casely-Hayford	1978 VG_{5}	Adelaide Casely-Hayford (1868–1960) was a Sierra Leonean educator, activist, and feminist. She worked to preserve Sierra Leonean heritage and promote cultural pride under British rule. A talented orator, she promoted African art and started a school for girls.	JPL · 6848
6849 Doloreshuerta	1979 MX_{6}	Dolores Huerta (1930–2026) was a Mexican-American civil rights leader. She co-founded the National Farmworkers Association, which won significant protections for farmworkers. She has won numerous awards for this work, including the Presidential Medal of Freedom in 2012.	JPL · 6849
6851 Chianti	1981 RO	The Chianti region, located in a rural part of Tuscany in Italy	JPL · 6851
6852 Nannibignami	1985 CN	Giovanni Bignami (1944–2017), Italian astrophysicist and president of the Italian Space Agency	JPL · 6852
6853 Silvanomassaglia	1986 CD	Silvano Massaglia (born 1951), Italian astrophysicist	JPL · 6853
6854 Georgewest	1987 UG	The small town of George West in South Texas. It is the home of George West High School, and the George West Mobile Observatory, from which physics teacher Kenneth Zeigler and a group of George West High School students have used CCD photometry to determine the rotational periods of many asteroids.	JPL · 6854
6855 Armellini	1989 BG	Giuseppe Armellini (1887–1958), Italian astronomer and professor of astronomy at the University of Rome	MPC · 6855
6856 Bethemmons	1989 EM	Elizabeth Emmons (born 1955), administrator of JPL's Space and Earth Science Division 32 †	MPC · 6856
6857 Castelli	1990 QQ	Benedetto Castelli (1578–1643) studied mathematics in Padova and was a favorite pupil of Galileo, with whom he discussed the significance of the phases of Venus in the Copernican theory. He also published works on fluids in motion, and is universally recognized as the founder of modern hydrodynamics.	JPL · 6857
6859 Datemasamune	1991 CZ	Date Masamune (1567–1636), Japanese ruler, daimyō	MPC · 6859
6860 Sims	1991 CS_{1}	Alan Sims (1920–1995), a naval officer who moved to Dublin in 1953 and became chairman of the Dublin Astronomy Association. On his retirement in 1983 he moved to Bath, where he took an active part in the William Herschel Society, serving first as secretary and later as vice chairman. He was also editor of the society's bulletin. Historians and librarians around the world corresponded with him, as he answered queries about the Herschels. Named by the discoverers following suggestions by F. Ring and S. Kimura	JPL · 6860
6862 Virgiliomarcon	1991 GL	Virgilio Marcon (1903–1976), Italian telescope maker, painter and teacher of art at San Donà del Piave in Venice	MPC · 6862
6864 Starkenburg	1991 RC	The medieval Starkenburg castle, in Hesse, Germany, where the nearby Starkenburg Observatory is located	MPC · 6864
6865 Dunkerley	1991 TE_{2}	Charlotte Herschel Dunkerley, descendant and genealogist of William Herschel and the Herschel family	MPC · 6865
6866 Kukai	1992 CO	Kūkai (774–835), Japanese buddhism monk	MPC · 6866
6867 Kuwano	1992 FP	Yoshiyuki Kuwano (1931-1998), Japanese amateur astronomer	MPC · 6867
6868 Seiyauyeda	1992 HD	Seiya Uyeda (born 1929), Japanese seismologist and professor emeritus at Tokyo University	MPC · 6868
6869 Funada	1992 JP	Takumi Funada (born 1932), Japanese astronomer, science teacher and director of the Sea and Star Museum	MPC · 6869
6870 Pauldavies	1992 OG	Paul Davies (born 1946), Australian physicist, writer and broadcaster	MPC · 6870
6871 Verlaine	1993 BE	Paul Verlaine (1844–1896), French poet	MPC · 6871
6873 Tasaka	1993 HT	Ichiro Tasaka (born 1929), Japanese amateur astronomer, farmer and astronomical optician	MPC · 6873
6875 Golgi	1994 NG_{1}	Camillo Golgi (1843–1926) was an Italian scientist, physician and biologist. The Golgi apparatus, Golgi tendon organ, Golgi tendon reflex and Golgi receptor are named after him. In 1906 he was awarded the Nobel Prize in Medicine for his studies on the structure of the nervous system.	JPL · 6875
6876 Beppeforti	1994 RK	Giuseppe Forti (1939–2007), Italian astronomer and discoverer of minor planets	MPC · 6876
6877 Giada	1994 TB_{2}	Giada Casulli (born 1978), daughter of the Italian discoverer Vincenzo Silvano Casulli	MPC · 6877
6878 Isamu	1994 TN	Isamu Hirabayashi (born 1941), Japanese amateur astronomer who founded the Japan Lunar and Planetary Observers Network	MPC · 6878
6879 Hyogo	1994 TC	The Hyōgo Prefecture in Japan, where the city of Kobe is located and this minor planet was discovered	MPC · 6879
6880 Hayamiyu	1994 TG	Yū Hayami (born 1966), Japanese singer and actress	MPC · 6880
6881 Shifutsu	1994 UP	Mount Shifutsu (2228 m), located in the Gunma Prefecture of Japan	MPC · 6881
6882 Sormano	1995 CC	Sormano, a village in Italy, home of the Osservatorio Astronomico Sormano (Sormano Astronomical Observatory) †	MPC · 6882
6883 Hiuchigatake	1996 AF	Hiuchigatake (Mount Hiuchi), a 2346-meter volcano in Oze National Park (formerly Nikko National Park) in Fukushima prefecture, Japan	MPC · 6883
6884 Takeshisato	9521 P-L	Takeshi Satō, Japanese educator and director of the planetarium at Hiroshima's Children's Museum	MPC · 6884
6885 Nitardy	9570 P-L	John H. Nitardy, a consultant and communications engineer for the Boeing Company	MPC · 6885
6886 Grote	1942 CG	Grote Reber (1911–2002), American radio astronomer	MPC · 6886
6887 Hasuo	1951 WH	Ryūichi Hasuo (born 1952), a Japanese amateur astronomer (also see 7136 Yokohasuo)	MPC · 6887
6890 Savinykh	1975 RP	Viktor Savinykh (born 1940), Russian cosmonaut and author	JPL · 6890
6891 Triconia	1976 SA	Paul, Joe, Charlie and Art who work at the Tri-Con Barber Shop in Lexington, Massachusetts	MPC · 6891
6892 Lana	1978 VG_{8}	Francesco Lana de Terzi (1631–1687), an Italian Jesuit, professor of physics and mathematics, first explored the concept for a vacuum airship, bringing human flight into the field of science. He also originated the idea and concept of an alphabet for the blind, which was developed later by Louis Braille.	JPL · 6892
6893 Sanderson	1983 RS_{3}	Richard Sanderson (born 1955) is Curator of Physical Science at the Springfield Science Museum in Massachusetts, USA. He has been actively involved in developing and presenting popular astronomy public outreach programs for several decades.	MPC · 6893
6894 Macreid	1986 RE_{2}	Macgregor S. Reid, a highly regarded manager at the Jet Propulsion Laboratory. For the past ten years he has been technical executive assistant to the director, responsible for planning and identifying issues of significance to the national space program and the laboratory's future. Reid is internationally recognized for his activities concerning international standard-setting. This object is being named to honor him on his retirement after a 30-year career at JPL. Citation prepared by E. C. Stone	JPL · 6894
6897 Tabei	1987 VQ	Junko Tabei (1939–2016), a Japanese mountaineer	MPC · 6897
6898 Saint-Marys	1988 LE	Saint Mary's University, located in Halifax, Nova Scotia, Canada	MPC · 6898
6899 Nancychabot	1988 RP_{10}	Nancy Chabot (born 1972), American planetary scientist	JPL · 6899

== 6901–7000 ==
back to top

Named minor planet	Provisional	This minor planet was named for...	Ref · Catalog
6901 Roybishop	1989 PA	Roy L. Bishop, Canadian astronomer and professor of physics at Acadia University.	MPC · 6901
6902 Hideoasada	1989 US	Hideo Asada (born 1953), Japanese telescope maker and popularizer of astronomy	MPC · 6902
6904 McGill	1990 QW	McGill University in Montreal, Canada	MPC · 6904
6905 Miyazaki	1990 TW	Isao Miyazaki (born 1961), Japanese amateur astronomer and director of the Jupiter–Saturn Section of the Oriental Astronomical Association (OAA)	MPC · 6905
6906 Johnmills	1990 WC	John Mills (1806–1899), Scottish twine manufacturer and amateur astronomer, benefactor of the first British public observatory, the Mills Observatory	JPL · 6906
6907 Harryford	1990 WE	Harry Ford (born 1938), a Scottish astronomy enthusiast	JPL · 6907
6908 Kunimoto	1990 WB	Yoshihiro Kunimoto (born 1958), Japanese composer and synthesizer musician	MPC · 6908
6909 Levison	1991 BY	Harold F. Levison (born 1959), American planetary scientist at the Southwest Research Institute	MPC · 6909
6910 Ikeguchi	1991 FJ	Kunio Ikeguchi (born 1953), Japanese amateur astronomer and member of the Yonago Astronomy Club	MPC · 6910
6911 Nancygreen	1991 GN	Nancy Green Hicks, horsewoman and fundraiser for astronomical research	MPC · 6911
6912 Grimm	1991 GQ	Friedrich Melchior, Baron von Grimm (1723–1807), German encyclopedist	MPC · 6912
6913 Yukawa	1991 UT	Hideki Yukawa (1907-1981), Japanese theoretical physicist and 1949 Nobel laureate	MPC · 6913
6914 Becquerel	1992 GZ	Henri Becquerel (1852–1908), French physicist and 1903 Nobel laureate	MPC · 6914
6916 Lewispearce	1992 OJ	Lewis Percival Pearce, infant son of Australian amateur astronomer Andrew Pearce	MPC · 6916
6917 Assateague	1993 FR_{2}	Assateague is an island and national park in Maryland with over 1 million visitors each year, has 37 miles of protected barrier habitat, and is one of few places in the United States where wild horses reside. In 2026 students at the University of Maryland observed the light curve and rotation period of this asteroid.	IAU · 6917
6918 Manaslu	1993 FV_{3}	Manaslu (Kutang) in the Himalayas, the eighth highest mountain in the world at 8,163 metres (26,781 ft). The summit was first reached by the Japanese party led by Maki Yūkō in 1956	JPL · 6918
6919 Tomonaga	1993 HP	Shin'ichirō Tomonaga (1906–1979), Japanese theoretical physicist and 1965 Nobel laureate	MPC · 6919
6920 Esaki	1993 JE	Leo Esaki (born 1925), Japanese theoretical physicist and 1973 Nobel laureate	MPC · 6920
6921 Janejacobs	1993 JJ	Jane Jacobs (1916–2006), American-born Canadian writer and activist	JPL · 6921
6922 Yasushi	1993 KY_{1}	Yasushi Sato (born 1957) is a member of the Matsue Astronomy Club who popularizes astronomy in Shimane. The name was suggested by H. Abe	JPL · 6922
6923 Borzacchini	1993 SD	Baconin Borzacchini (1898–1933), Italian racing driver	MPC · 6923
6924 Fukui	1993 TP	Kenichi Fukui (1918–1998), Japanese chemist and 1981 Nobel laureate	MPC · 6924
6925 Susumu	1993 UW	Augustin Susumu Yamamoto (born 1915), Japanese astronomer and director of the Yamamoto Observatory (404)	MPC · 6925
6927 Tonegawa	1994 TE	Susumu Tonegawa (born 1939), Japanese scientist and 1987 Nobel laureate	MPC · 6927
6928 Lanna	1994 TM	Vojtěch Lanna (1805-1866), Czech entrepreneur	MPC · 6928
6929 Misto	1994 UE	Angela Misto (1902–1993), mother of Italian amateur astronomer Vincenzo Silvano Casulli, who discovered this minor planet	JPL · 6929
6931 Kenzaburo	1994 VP	Kenzaburō Ōe (born 1935), Japanese writer and 1994 Nobel laureate	MPC · 6931
6932 Tanigawadake	1994 YK	Mount Tanigawa, Gunma and Niigata Prefecture, Japan	MPC · 6932
6933 Azumayasan	1994 YW	Mount Azumaya (2354 meters), located in Gunma Prefecture, Japan	MPC · 6933
6935 Morisot	4524 P-L	Berthe Morisot (1841–1895), French impressionist painter	MPC · 6935
6936 Cassatt	6573 P-L	Mary Cassatt (1844–1926), American impressionistic painter and printmaker	MPC · 6936
6937 Valadon	1010 T-2	Suzanne Valadon (1865–1938), French painter who also modeled for Chavannes, Degas and Renoir	MPC · 6937
6938 Soniaterk	5140 T-2	Sonia Delaunay (née Terk; 1885–1979), Ukrainian-born designer and founder of the Orphism movement and wife of Robert Delaunay	MPC · 6938
6939 Lestone	1952 SW_{1}	Town of Leighton Buzzard in south Bedfordshire, England	MPC · 6939
6941 Dalgarno	1976 YA	Alexander Dalgarno (1928–2015), British physicist and professor of astronomy at Harvard University	MPC · 6941
6942 Yurigulyaev	1976 YB	Yuri Vasil'evich Gulyaev (born 1935), Russian physicist and director of the Institute of Radio-engineering and Electronics in Moscow	JPL · 6942
6943 Moretto	1978 VR_{4}	Moretto da Brescia (c. 1498–1554), Italian painter recognized as one of the masters of the Italian Renaissance and produced fine altarpieces and religious works. His works are exhibited all over the world, including at the National Gallery of London.	JPL · 6943
6944 Elaineowens	1979 MR_{3}	Elaine Owens (born 1947), American long-time administrative coordinator at PSI in Tucson, Arizona.	JPL · 6944
6945 Dahlgren	1980 FZ	Mats Dahlgren (born 1966), Swedish astronomer	MPC · 6945
6947 Andrewdavis	1981 ET_{8}	Andrew M. Davis (born 1950), American meteoriticist at the University of Chicago	JPL · 6947
6948 Gounelle	1981 ET_{22}	Matthieu Gounelle (born 1971), French curator of meteorites at the Muséum national d'histoire naturelle in Paris	JPL · 6948
6949 Zissell	1982 RZ	Ronald E. Zissell (born 1943), American variable star astronomer at Mount Holyoke College	JPL · 6949
6950 Simonek	1982 YQ	Simone Ek, wife of the Belgian discoverer François Dossin, in acknowledgment of the patience and understanding of a dedicated astronomer's wife	JPL · 6950
6952 Niccolò	1986 JT	Niccolò Fulchignoni (born 1991), planetary scientists at the Paris Observatory	JPL · 6952
6953 Davepierce	1986 PC	David A. Pierce (born 1936), American astronomy and physics teacher and developer of TV and online courses	MPC · 6953
6954 Potemkin	1987 RB	Grigory Potemkin (1739–1791), Russian field marshal, favourite of Catherine the Great	MPC · 6954
6955 Ekaterina	1987 SP	Catherine the Great (1729–1796), Empress of Russia	MPC · 6955
6956 Holbach	1988 CX	Baron d'Holbach (1723-1789), French-German philosopher and encyclopedist during the French Enlightenment	MPC · 6956
6959 Mikkelkocha	1988 VD	Mikkel Kock Augustesen (born 2004), grandson of Danish astronomer Poul Jensen who discovered this minor planet	JPL · 6959
6961 Ashitaka	1989 KA	Mount Ashitaka, Japanese dormant volcano	MPC · 6961
6962 Summerscience	1990 OT	The Summer Science Program, a college-level summer program for gifted high school students	MPC · 6962
6964 Kunihiko	1990 TL	Kunihiko Kodaira (1915–1997), Japanese mathematician	MPC · 6964
6965 Niyodogawa	1990 VS	Niyodo River, on Shikoku in Japan	MPC · 6965
6966 Vietoris	1991 RD	Leopold Vietoris (1891–2002), Austrian mathematician	MPC · 6966
6969 Santaro	1991 VF	Santarō Harada (1913–), Japanese astronomer and optical engineer	MPC · 6969
6970 Saigusa	1992 AL	Yosikazu Saigusa (born 1928), Japanese amateur astronomer and discoverer of comets C/1975 T2 and C/1983 J1	MPC · 6970
6971 Omogokei	1992 CT	Omogokei, a deep narrow gorge at the foot of Mount Ishizuti in Ehime Prefecture, Japan	MPC · 6971
6972 Helvetius	1992 GY	Claude Adrien Helvétius (1715-1771), French philosopher and encyclopedist	MPC · 6972
6973 Karajan	1992 HK	Herbert von Karajan (1908–1989), an Austrian orchestra conductor	JPL · 6973
6974 Solti	1992 MC	Georg Solti (1912–1997), Hungarian-British orchestra conductor	JPL · 6974
6975 Hiroaki	1992 QM	Hiroaki Hayashi (born 1954), Japanese amateur astronomer and instructor of DIY telescopes for children	MPC · 6975
6976 Kanatsu	1993 KD	Kazuyoshi Kanatsu (born 1953), a Japanese amateur astronomer and discoverer of 1993 nova V705 Cas	MPC · 6976
6977 Jaucourt	1993 OZ	Louis de Jaucourt (1704–1779), French writer and encyclopedist	MPC · 6977
6978 Hironaka	1993 RD	Heisuke Hironaka (born 1931), Japanese mathematician	MPC · 6978
6979 Shigefumi	1993 RH	Shigefumi Mori (born 1951), Japanese mathematician	MPC · 6979
6980 Kyusakamoto	1993 SV	Kyu Sakamoto (1941–1985), Japanese singer. This minor planet also honors the other members of the musical trio: Rokusuke Ei (lyricist) and Hachidai Nakamura (composer). (In Japanese, "Roku" means "6", "Kyu" is "9", and "Hachi" is "8").	MPC · 6980
6981 Chirman	1993 TK_{2}	The Surgical Department of the hospital in the Italian village of Manerbio, located a few kilometers from the Bassano Observatory. The name, a contraction of Chirurgia (Surgery) and the name of the village, is presented in honor of the doctors, nurses and all the personnel of the hospital for the competence, absorption and passion they devote to the care of patients	JPL · 6981
6982 Cesarchavez	1993 UA_{3}	Cesar Chavez (1927–1993) was a Mexican-American civil rights leader. He co-founded the National Farmworkers Association, which won significant protections for farmworkers. His birthday is a holiday in several US states, and he received the Presidential Medal of Freedom in 1994.	JPL · 6982
6983 Komatsusakyo	1993 YC	Sakyo Komatsu (1931–2011), Japanese science fiction writer	MPC · 6983
6984 Lewiscarroll	1994 AO	Lewis Carroll (1832–1898), English writer famous for his novel Alice's Adventures in Wonderland	MPC · 6984
6986 Asamayama	1994 WE	Mount Asama, located in the Nagano Prefecture of Japan	MPC · 6986
6987 Onioshidashi	1994 WZ	Onioshidashi lava flow, Mount Asama, Japan	MPC · 6987
6989 Hoshinosato	1994 XH	Observation point of amateur astronomers, Minano, Saitama, Japan	MPC · 6989
6990 Toya	1994 XU	Mount Toya, Minano, Saitama, Japan	MPC · 6990
6991 Chichibu	1995 AX	The Japanese city of Chichibu, located in Saitama Prefecture	MPC · 6991
6992 Minano-machi	1995 BT	Minano-town, Saitama, Japan	MPC · 6992
6995 Minoyama	1996 BZ	Mount Minoyama (elevation 587 metres above sea level) located in Saitama, Japan	JPL · 6995
6996 Alvensleben	2222 T-2	Bertha von Alvensleben (1859–1912), wife of German Protestant clergyman Friedrich Winfried Schubart and grandmother of astronomer Joachim Schubart	MPC · 6996
6997 Laomedon	3104 T-3	Laomedon, king of Troy from Greek mythology	JPL · 6997
6998 Tithonus	3108 T-3	Tithonus, prince of Troy and lover of Eos from Greek mythology	JPL · 6998
6999 Meitner	4379 T-3	Lise Meitner (1878–1968), Austrian nuclear physicist	MPC · 6999
7000 Curie	1939 VD	Marie Curie (1867–1934), Polish physicist	MPC · 7000

back to top

Preceded by 5,001–6,000	Meanings of minor-planet names List of minor planets: 6,001–7,000	Succeeded by 7,001–8,000
