= Arlington Friends of the Drama =

== History ==
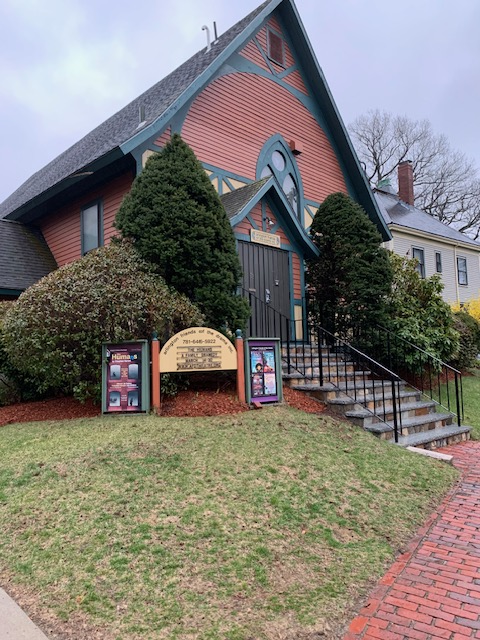
View of the front door of the former church (now serves as an exit directly out of the theater)

Arlington Friends of the Drama, also known as AFD Theatre, is located in Arlington, Massachusetts. Founded in 1923, it is one of the ten oldest continually operating community theaters in the United States. Incorporated as a not-for-profit organization in the early 1930s, Arlington Friends of the Drama outbid the Odd Fellows in 1933 to purchase the St. John's Episcopal Church building, which had outgrown the space and was building a new church one block away. Originally purchased for $8200, the building has since served as the organization's theater, and is part of the Arlington Center Historic District. The church pews served as seats until the theater was given a gift of used theater seats in 1947. In 1998 the theater underwent renovations to expand the lobby and make the building handicap accessible.

The opening season, the theater first produced an evening of one-act plays. Though founded by ladies of the Arlington Woman's Club, by 1924 men were allowed to join and take part in the productions. The first major musical produced by the theater was Iolanthe in 1935. Currently the theater produces four shows per year, usually including a major musical, a comedy, a drama and a smaller musical. The theater provides members of the community experience in all aspects of theater arts through hands-on experience, mentorship, and workshops. In addition, every year the Denis M. Fitzpatrick Scholarship is awarded to a graduating Arlington High School senior, chosen by the high school, who has demonstrated excellence in some aspect of theater arts and wishes to continue their studies at the college level. The theater is a member of EMACT, the Eastern Massachusetts Association of Community Theaters, as well as AACT, the American Association of Community Theatre.

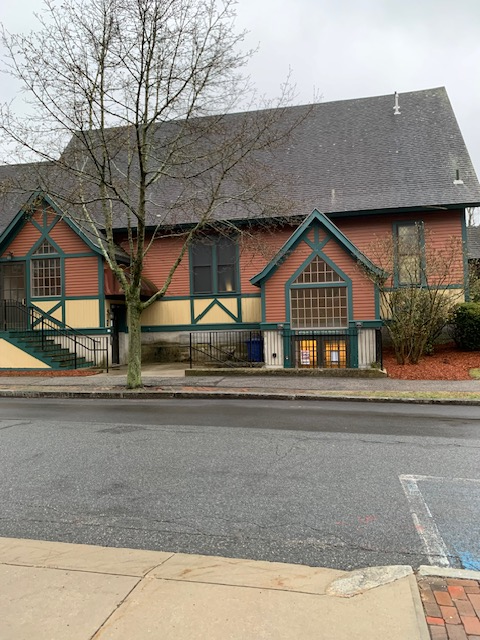
Side view of the building, showing the below-ground door into the lobby and the side entrance into the theater space

The theater was subject of the book The Stuff of Dreams: Behind the Scenes of an American Community Theater, by Leah Hager Cohen, and is mentioned frequently in Images of America: Greater Boston Community Theater by Judson Lee Pierce.

== Awards ==
Eastern Massachusetts Association of Community Theaters (EMACT), New England Theater Competition:

- K2 – 1990
- The Elephant Man – 1993
- A Piece of My Heart – 1995
- M Butterfly – 1999
- How I Learned to Drive – 2008

Moss Hart Award:

- The Crucible – 1967
- Fiddler on the Roof – 1972
- The Secret Garden – 1997
- M Butterfly – 1999
- Wit – 2006

Moss Hart Honorable Mention: Into the Woods 2002, Rabbit Hole 2009

EMACT Distinguished Achievement Awards:

- The Laramie Project (Best Play 2004)
- Titanic (Best Musical 2004)
- Kiss of the Spider Woman (Best Musical 2005)
- West Side Story (Best Musical 2006)
- How I Learned to Drive (Best Play 2008)
