= List of named minor planets: 6000–6999 =

This is a partial list of named minor planets in numerical order. It contains a total of 855 entries as of 15 June 2026. Minor planets for which no article exist are displayed in grey color and redirect to the list of minor planets (see List of minor planets § Main index).

== From 6,000 to 6,999 ==
- 6000 United Nations
- 6001 Thales
- 6002 Eetion
- 6006 Anaximandros
- 6007 Billevans
- 6009 Yuzuruyoshii
- 6010 Lyzenga
- 6011 Tozzi
- 6012 Williammurdoch
- 6013 Andanike
- 6014 Chribrenmark
- 6015 Paularego
- 6016 Carnelli
- 6017 Robertmorehead
- 6018 Pierssac
- 6019 Telford
- 6020 Miyamoto
- 6022 Jyuro
- 6023 Tsuyashima
- 6024 Ochanomizu
- 6025 Naotosato
- 6026 Xenophanes
- 6027 Waratah
- 6029 Edithrand
- 6030 Zolensky
- 6031 Ryokan
- 6032 Nobel
- 6033 Southwood
- 6035 Citlaltépetl
- 6036 Weinberg
- 6039 Parmenides
- 6041 Juterkilian
- 6042 Cheshirecat
- 6043 Aurochs
- 6044 Hammer-Purgstall
- 6049 Toda
- 6050 Miwablock
- 6051 Anaximenes
- 6052 Junichi
- 6054 Ghiberti
- 6055 Brunelleschi
- 6056 Donatello
- 6057 Robbia
- 6058 Carlnielsen
- 6059 Diefenbach
- 6060 Doudleby
- 6062 Vespa
- 6063 Jason
- 6064 Holašovice
- 6065 Chesneau
- 6066 Hendricks
- 6067 Donutil
- 6068 Brandenburg
- 6069 Cevolani
- 6070 Rheinland
- 6071 Sakitama
- 6072 Hooghoudt
- 6073 Tähtiseuraursa
- 6074 Bechtereva
- 6075 Zajtsev
- 6076 Plavec
- 6077 Messner
- 6078 Burt
- 6079 Gerokurat
- 6080 Lugmair
- 6081 Cloutis
- 6082 Timiryazev
- 6083 Janeirabloom
- 6084 Bascom
- 6085 Fraethi
- 6086 Vrchlický
- 6087 Lupo
- 6088 Hoshigakubo
- 6089 Izumi
- 6090 Aulis
- 6091 Mitsuru
- 6092 Johnmason
- 6093 Makoto
- 6094 Hisako
- 6097 Koishikawa
- 6098 Mutojunkyu
- 6099 Saarland
- 6100 Kunitomoikkansai
- 6101 Tomoki
- 6102 Visby
- 6104 Takao
- 6105 Verrocchio
- 6106 Stoss
- 6107 Osterbrock
- 6108 Glebov
- 6109 Balseiro
- 6110 Kazak
- 6111 Davemckay
- 6112 Ludolfschultz
- 6113 Tsap
- 6114 Dalla-Degregori
- 6115 Martinduncan
- 6116 Still
- 6117 Brevardastro
- 6118 Mayuboshi
- 6119 Hjorth
- 6120 Anhalt
- 6121 Plachinda
- 6122 Henrard
- 6123 Aristoteles
- 6124 Mecklenburg
- 6125 Singto
- 6126 Hubelmatt
- 6127 Hetherington
- 6128 Lasorda
- 6129 Demokritos
- 6130 Hutton
- 6131 Towen
- 6132 Danielson
- 6133 Royaldutchastro
- 6134 Kamagari
- 6135 Billowen
- 6136 Gryphon
- 6137 Johnfletcher
- 6138 Miguelhernández
- 6139 Naomi
- 6140 Kubokawa
- 6141 Durda
- 6142 Tantawi
- 6143 Pythagoras
- 6144 Kondojiro
- 6145 Riemenschneider
- 6146 Adamkrafft
- 6147 Straub
- 6148 Ignazgünther
- 6149 Pelčák
- 6150 Neukum
- 6151 Viget
- 6152 Empedocles
- 6153 Hershey
- 6154 Stevesynnott
- 6155 Yokosugano
- 6156 Dall
- 6157 Prey
- 6158 Shosanbetsu
- 6159 Andréseloy
- 6160 Minakata
- 6161 Vojno-Yasenetsky
- 6162 Prokhorov
- 6163 Reimers
- 6164 Gerhardmüller
- 6165 Frolova
- 6166 Univsima
- 6167 Narmanskij
- 6168 Isnello
- 6169 Sashakrot
- 6170 Levasseur
- 6171 Uttorp
- 6172 Prokofeana
- 6173 Jimwestphal
- 6174 Polybius
- 6175 Cori
- 6176 Horrigan
- 6177 Fécamp
- 6179 Brett
- 6180 Bystritskaya
- 6181 Bobweber
- 6182 Katygord
- 6183 Viscome
- 6184 Nordlund
- 6185 Mitsuma
- 6186 Zenon
- 6187 Kagura
- 6188 Robertpepin
- 6189 Völk
- 6190 Rennes
- 6191 Eades
- 6192 Javiergorosabel
- 6193 Manabe
- 6194 Denali
- 6195 Nukariya
- 6196 Bernardbowen
- 6197 Taracho
- 6198 Shirakawa
- 6199 Yoshiokayayoi
- 6200 Hachinohe
- 6201 Ichiroshimizu
- 6202 Georgemiley
- 6203 Lyubamoroz
- 6204 MacKenzie
- 6205 Menottigalli
- 6206 Corradolamberti
- 6207 Bourvil
- 6208 Wakata
- 6209 Schwaben
- 6210 Hyunseop
- 6211 Tsubame
- 6212 Franzthaler
- 6213 Zwiers
- 6214 Mikhailgrinev
- 6215 Mehdia
- 6216 San Jose
- 6217 Kodai
- 6218 Mizushima
- 6219 Demalia
- 6220 Stepanmakarov
- 6221 Ducentesima
- 6223 Dahl
- 6224 El Goresy
- 6225 Hiroko
- 6226 Paulwarren
- 6227 Alanrubin
- 6228 Yonezawa
- 6229 Tursachan
- 6230 Fram
- 6231 Hundertwasser
- 6232 Zubitskia
- 6233 Kimura
- 6234 Sheilawolfman
- 6235 Burney
- 6236 Mallard
- 6237 Chikushi
- 6238 Septimaclark
- 6239 Minos
- 6240 Lucretius Carus
- 6241 Galante
- 6243 Yoder
- 6244 Okamoto
- 6245 Ikufumi
- 6246 Komurotoru
- 6247 Amanogawa
- 6248 Bardon
- 6249 Jennifer
- 6250 Saekohayashi
- 6251 Setsuko
- 6252 Montevideo
- 6255 Kuma
- 6256 Canova
- 6257 Thorvaldsen
- 6258 Rodin
- 6259 Maillol
- 6260 Kelsey
- 6261 Chione
- 6262 Javid
- 6263 Druckmüller
- 6266 Letzel
- 6267 Rozhen
- 6268 Versailles
- 6269 Kawasaki
- 6270 Kabukuri
- 6271 Farmer
- 6273 Kiruna
- 6274 Taizaburo
- 6275 Kiryu
- 6276 Kurohone
- 6277 Siok
- 6278 Ametkhan
- 6280 Sicardy
- 6281 Strnad
- 6282 Edwelda
- 6283 Menghuazhu
- 6284 Borisivanov
- 6285 Ingram
- 6287 Lenham
- 6288 Fouts
- 6289 Lanusei
- 6291 Renzetti
- 6293 Oberpfalz
- 6294 Czerny
- 6295 Schmoll
- 6296 Cleveland
- 6298 Sawaoka
- 6299 Reizoutoyoko
- 6300 Hosamu
- 6301 Bohumilruprecht
- 6302 Tengukogen
- 6304 Josephus Flavius
- 6305 Helgoland
- 6306 Nishimura
- 6307 Maiztegui
- 6308 Ebisuzaki
- 6309 Elsschot
- 6310 Jankonke
- 6311 Porubčan
- 6312 Robheinlein
- 6313 Tsurutani
- 6314 Reigber
- 6315 Barabash
- 6316 Méndez
- 6317 Dreyfus
- 6318 Cronkite
- 6319 Beregovoj
- 6320 Bremen
- 6321 Namuratakao
- 6323 Karoji
- 6324 Kejonuma
- 6326 Idamiyoshi
- 6327 Tijn
- 6329 Hikonejyo
- 6330 Koen
- 6332 Vorarlberg
- 6333 Helenejacq
- 6334 Robleonard
- 6335 Nicolerappaport
- 6336 Dodo
- 6337 Shiota
- 6338 Isaosato
- 6339 Giliberti
- 6340 Kathmandu
- 6345 Hideo
- 6346 Syukumeguri
- 6349 Acapulco
- 6350 Schlüter
- 6351 Neumann
- 6352 Schlaun
- 6353 Semper
- 6354 Vangelis
- 6355 Univermoscow
- 6356 Tairov
- 6357 Glushko
- 6358 Chertok
- 6359 Dubinin
- 6361 Koppel
- 6362 Tunis
- 6363 Doggett
- 6364 Casarini
- 6365 Nickschneider
- 6366 Rainerwieler
- 6368 Richardmenendez
- 6370 Malpais
- 6371 Heinlein
- 6372 Walker
- 6373 Stern
- 6374 Beslan
- 6375 Fredharris
- 6376 Schamp
- 6377 Cagney
- 6379 Vrba
- 6380 Gardel
- 6381 Toyama
- 6383 Tokushima
- 6384 Kervin
- 6385 Martindavid
- 6386 Keithnoll
- 6389 Ogawa
- 6390 Hirabayashi
- 6391 Africano
- 6392 Takashimizuno
- 6395 Hilliard
- 6396 Schleswig
- 6398 Timhunter
- 6399 Harada
- 6400 Georgealexander
- 6401 Röntgen
- 6402 Holstein
- 6403 Steverin
- 6404 Vanavara
- 6405 Komiyama
- 6406 Mikejura
- 6408 Saijo
- 6410 Fujiwara
- 6411 Tamaga
- 6412 Kaifu
- 6413 Iye
- 6414 Mizunuma
- 6416 Nyukasayama
- 6417 Liberati
- 6418 Hanamigahara
- 6419 Susono
- 6420 Riheijyaya
- 6422 Akagi
- 6423 Harunasan
- 6424 Ando
- 6426 Vanýsek
- 6428 Barlach
- 6429 Brâncuși
- 6432 Temirkanov
- 6433 Enya
- 6434 Jewitt
- 6435 Daveross
- 6436 Coco
- 6437 Stroganov
- 6438 Suárez
- 6439 Tirol
- 6440 Ransome
- 6441 Milenajesenská
- 6442 Salzburg
- 6443 Harpalion
- 6444 Ryuzin
- 6445 Bellmore
- 6446 Lomberg
- 6447 Terrycole
- 6449 Kudara
- 6450 Masahikohayashi
- 6451 Kärnten
- 6452 Johneuller
- 6456 Golombek
- 6457 Kremsmünster
- 6458 Nouda
- 6459 Hidesan
- 6460 Bassano
- 6461 Adam
- 6462 Myougi
- 6463 Isoda
- 6464 Kaburaki
- 6465 Zvezdotchet
- 6466 Drewesquivel
- 6467 Prilepina
- 6468 Welzenbach
- 6469 Armstrong
- 6470 Aldrin
- 6471 Collins
- 6472 Rosema
- 6473 Winkler
- 6474 Choate
- 6475 Refugium
- 6478 Gault
- 6479 Leoconnolly
- 6480 Scarlatti
- 6481 Tenzing
- 6482 Steiermark
- 6483 Nikolajvasilʹev
- 6484 Barthibbs
- 6485 Wendeesther
- 6486 Anitahill
- 6487 Tonyspear
- 6488 Drebach
- 6489 Golevka
- 6493 Cathybennett
- 6496 Kazuko
- 6497 Yamasaki
- 6498 Ko
- 6499 Michiko
- 6500 Kodaira
- 6501 Isonzo
- 6504 Lehmbruck
- 6505 Muzzio
- 6506 Klausheide
- 6508 Rolčík
- 6509 Giovannipratesi
- 6510 Tarry
- 6511 Furmanov
- 6512 de Bergh
- 6514 Torahiko
- 6515 Giannigalli
- 6516 Gruss
- 6517 Buzzi
- 6518 Vernon
- 6519 Giono
- 6520 Sugawa
- 6521 Pina
- 6522 Aci
- 6523 Clube
- 6524 Baalke
- 6525 Ocastron
- 6526 Matogawa
- 6527 Takashiito
- 6528 Boden
- 6529 Rhoads
- 6530 Adry
- 6531 Subashiri
- 6532 Scarfe
- 6533 Giuseppina
- 6534 Carriepeterson
- 6535 Archipenko
- 6536 Vysochinska
- 6537 Adamovich
- 6538 Muraviov
- 6539 Nohavica
- 6540 Stepling
- 6541 Yuan
- 6542 Jacquescousteau
- 6543 Senna
- 6544 Stevendick
- 6545 Leitus
- 6546 Kaye
- 6547 Vasilkarazin
- 6548 Maxalexander
- 6549 Skryabin
- 6550 Parléř
- 6552 Higginson
- 6553 Seehaus
- 6554 Takatsuguyoshida
- 6556 Arcimboldo
- 6557 Yokonomura
- 6558 Norizuki
- 6559 Nomura
- 6560 Pravdo
- 6561 Gruppetta
- 6562 Takoyaki
- 6563 Steinheim
- 6564 Asher
- 6565 Reiji
- 6566 Shafter
- 6567 Shigemasa
- 6568 Serendip
- 6569 Ondaatje
- 6570 Tomohiro
- 6571 Sigmund
- 6572 Carson
- 6573 Magnitskij
- 6574 Gvishiani
- 6575 Slavov
- 6576 Kievtech
- 6577 Torbenwolff
- 6578 Zapesotskij
- 6579 Benedix
- 6580 Philbland
- 6581 Sobers
- 6582 Flagsymphony
- 6583 Destinn
- 6584 Luděkpešek
- 6585 O'Keefe
- 6586 Seydler
- 6587 Brassens
- 6589 Jankovich
- 6590 Barolo
- 6591 Sabinin
- 6592 Goya
- 6594 Tasman
- 6595 Munizbarreto
- 6596 Bittner
- 6597 Kreil
- 6598 Modugno
- 6599 Tsuko
- 6600 Qwerty
- 6601 Schmeer
- 6602 Gilclark
- 6603 Marycragg
- 6604 Ilias
- 6605 Carmontelle
- 6606 Makino
- 6607 Matsushima
- 6608 Davidecrespi
- 6610 Burwitz
- 6612 Hachioji
- 6613 Williamcarl
- 6614 Antisthenes
- 6615 Plutarchos
- 6616 Plotinos
- 6617 Boethius
- 6618 Jimsimons
- 6619 Kolya
- 6620 Peregrina
- 6621 Timchuk
- 6622 Matvienko
- 6623 Trioconbrio
- 6625 Nyquist
- 6626 Mattgenge
- 6628 Dondelia
- 6629 Kurtz
- 6630 Skepticus
- 6631 Pyatnitskij
- 6632 Scoon
- 6635 Zuber
- 6636 Kintanar
- 6637 Inoue
- 6639 Marchis
- 6640 Falorni
- 6641 Bobross
- 6642 Henze
- 6643 Morikubo
- 6644 Jugaku
- 6645 Arcetri
- 6646 Churanta
- 6647 Josse
- 6649 Yokotatakao
- 6650 Morimoto
- 6651 Rogervenable
- 6653 Feininger
- 6654 Luleå
- 6655 Nagahama
- 6656 Yokota
- 6657 Otukyo
- 6658 Akiraabe
- 6659 Pietsch
- 6660 Matsumoto
- 6661 Ikemura
- 6663 Tatebayashi
- 6664 Tennyo
- 6665 Kagawa
- 6666 Frö
- 6667 Sannaimura
- 6669 Obi
- 6670 Wallach
- 6671 Concari
- 6672 Corot
- 6673 Degas
- 6674 Cézanne
- 6675 Sisley
- 6676 Monet
- 6677 Renoir
- 6678 Seurat
- 6679 Gurzhij
- 6681 Prokopovich
- 6682 Makarij
- 6683 Karachentsov
- 6684 Volodshevchenko
- 6685 Boitsov
- 6686 Hernius
- 6687 Lahulla
- 6688 Donmccarthy
- 6689 Floss
- 6690 Messick
- 6691 Trussoni
- 6692 Antonínholý
- 6695 Barrettduff
- 6696 Eubanks
- 6697 Celentano
- 6698 Malhotra
- 6699 Igaueno
- 6700 Kubišová
- 6701 Warhol
- 6705 Rinaketty
- 6707 Shigeru
- 6708 Bobbievaile
- 6709 Hiromiyuki
- 6710 Apostel
- 6711 Holliman
- 6712 Hornstein
- 6713 Coggie
- 6714 Montréal
- 6715 Sheldonmarks
- 6716 Jacobsen
- 6717 Antal
- 6718 Beiglböck
- 6719 Gallaj
- 6720 Gifu
- 6721 Minamiawaji
- 6722 Bunichi
- 6723 Chrisclark
- 6725 Engyoji
- 6726 Suthers
- 6729 Emiko
- 6730 Ikeda
- 6731 Hiei
- 6734 Benzenberg
- 6735 Madhatter
- 6736 Marchare
- 6737 Okabayashi
- 6738 Tanabe
- 6739 Tärendö
- 6740 Goff
- 6741 Liyuan
- 6742 Biandepei
- 6743 Liu
- 6744 Komoda
- 6745 Nishiyama
- 6746 Zagar
- 6747 Ozegahara
- 6748 Bratton
- 6749 Ireentje
- 6750 Katgert
- 6751 van Genderen
- 6752 Ashley
- 6753 Fursenko
- 6754 Burdenko
- 6755 Solovʹyanenko
- 6756 Williamfeldman
- 6757 Addibischoff
- 6758 Jesseowens
- 6761 Haroldconnolly
- 6762 Cyrenagoodrich
- 6763 Kochiny
- 6764 Kirillavrov
- 6765 Fibonacci
- 6766 Kharms
- 6767 Shirvindt
- 6768 Mathiasbraun
- 6769 Brokoff
- 6770 Fugate
- 6771 Foerster
- 6773 Kellaway
- 6774 Vladheinrich
- 6775 Giorgini
- 6776 Dix
- 6777 Balakirev
- 6778 Tosamakoto
- 6779 Perrine
- 6780 Borodin
- 6781 Sheikhumarrkhan
- 6783 Gulyaev
- 6784 Bogatikov
- 6786 Doudantsutsuji
- 6789 Milkey
- 6790 Pingouin
- 6792 Akiyamatakashi
- 6793 Palazzolo
- 6794 Masuisakura
- 6795 Örnsköldsvik
- 6796 Sundsvall
- 6797 Östersund
- 6798 Couperin
- 6799 Citfiftythree
- 6800 Saragamine
- 6801 Střekov
- 6802 Černovice
- 6804 Maruseppu
- 6805 Abstracta
- 6806 Kaufmann
- 6807 Brünnow
- 6808 Plantin
- 6809 Sakuma
- 6810 Juanclariá
- 6811 Kashcheev
- 6812 Robertnelson
- 6813 Amandahendrix
- 6814 Steffl
- 6815 Mutchler
- 6816 Barbcohen
- 6817 Pest
- 6818 Sessyu
- 6819 McGarvey
- 6820 Buil
- 6821 Ranevskaya
- 6822 Horálek
- 6824 Mallory
- 6825 Irvine
- 6826 Lavoisier
- 6827 Wombat
- 6828 Elbsteel
- 6829 Charmawidor
- 6830 Johnbackus
- 6832 Kawabata
- 6834 Hunfeld
- 6835 Molfino
- 6836 Paranal
- 6837 Bressi
- 6838 Okuda
- 6839 Ozenuma
- 6841 Gottfriedkirch
- 6842 Krosigk
- 6843 Heremon
- 6844 Shpak
- 6845 Mansurova
- 6846 Kansazan
- 6847 Kunz-Hallstein
- 6848 Casely-Hayford
- 6849 Doloreshuerta
- 6851 Chianti
- 6852 Nannibignami
- 6853 Silvanomassaglia
- 6854 Georgewest
- 6855 Armellini
- 6856 Bethemmons
- 6857 Castelli
- 6859 Datemasamune
- 6860 Sims
- 6862 Virgiliomarcon
- 6864 Starkenburg
- 6865 Dunkerley
- 6866 Kukai
- 6867 Kuwano
- 6868 Seiyauyeda
- 6869 Funada
- 6870 Pauldavies
- 6871 Verlaine
- 6873 Tasaka
- 6875 Golgi
- 6876 Beppeforti
- 6877 Giada
- 6878 Isamu
- 6879 Hyogo
- 6880 Hayamiyu
- 6881 Shifutsu
- 6882 Sormano
- 6883 Hiuchigatake
- 6884 Takeshisato
- 6885 Nitardy
- 6886 Grote
- 6887 Hasuo
- 6890 Savinykh
- 6891 Triconia
- 6892 Lana
- 6893 Sanderson
- 6894 Macreid
- 6897 Tabei
- 6898 Saint-Marys
- 6899 Nancychabot
- 6901 Roybishop
- 6902 Hideoasada
- 6904 McGill
- 6905 Miyazaki
- 6906 Johnmills
- 6907 Harryford
- 6908 Kunimoto
- 6909 Levison
- 6910 Ikeguchi
- 6911 Nancygreen
- 6912 Grimm
- 6913 Yukawa
- 6914 Becquerel
- 6916 Lewispearce
- 6917 Assateague
- 6918 Manaslu
- 6919 Tomonaga
- 6920 Esaki
- 6921 Janejacobs
- 6922 Yasushi
- 6923 Borzacchini
- 6924 Fukui
- 6925 Susumu
- 6927 Tonegawa
- 6928 Lanna
- 6929 Misto
- 6931 Kenzaburo
- 6932 Tanigawadake
- 6933 Azumayasan
- 6935 Morisot
- 6936 Cassatt
- 6937 Valadon
- 6938 Soniaterk
- 6939 Lestone
- 6941 Dalgarno
- 6942 Yurigulyaev
- 6943 Moretto
- 6944 Elaineowens
- 6945 Dahlgren
- 6947 Andrewdavis
- 6948 Gounelle
- 6949 Zissell
- 6950 Simonek
- 6952 Niccolò
- 6953 Davepierce
- 6954 Potemkin
- 6955 Ekaterina
- 6956 Holbach
- 6959 Mikkelkocha
- 6961 Ashitaka
- 6962 Summerscience
- 6964 Kunihiko
- 6965 Niyodogawa
- 6966 Vietoris
- 6969 Santaro
- 6970 Saigusa
- 6971 Omogokei
- 6972 Helvetius
- 6973 Karajan
- 6974 Solti
- 6975 Hiroaki
- 6976 Kanatsu
- 6977 Jaucourt
- 6978 Hironaka
- 6979 Shigefumi
- 6980 Kyusakamoto
- 6981 Chirman
- 6982 Cesarchavez
- 6983 Komatsusakyo
- 6984 Lewiscarroll
- 6986 Asamayama
- 6987 Onioshidashi
- 6989 Hoshinosato
- 6990 Toya
- 6991 Chichibu
- 6992 Minano-machi
- 6995 Minoyama
- 6996 Alvensleben
- 6997 Laomedon
- 6998 Tithonus
- 6999 Meitner
back to top

== See also ==
- List of minor planet discoverers
- List of observatory codes
- Meanings of minor planet names § Index
