= Mrkos =

- Pronunciation: Czech pronunciation: [ˈmr̩kos]

Origin
- Language: Czech
- Meaning: ?
- Region of origin: Czech Republic

Other names
- Variant form: ?

Mrkos may refer to:

- Antonín Mrkos (1918, Střemchoví, Dolní Loučky - 1996), a Czech astronomer
  - 143P/Kowal-Mrkos, a periodic comet
  - 18D/Perrine-Mrkos, a periodic comet
  - 1832 Mrkos (provisional designation 1969 PC), an outer main belt asteroid discovered in 1969 by L. Chernykh
  - 45P/Honda-Mrkos-Pajdušáková, a periodic comet discovered on 1948
  - Comet Mrkos (disambiguation)
