= Comet Mrkos =

Comet Mrkos may refer to any one of these comets discovered by Antonín Mrkos below:

- 124P/Mrkos
- C/1947 Y1
- C/1952 H1
- C/1952 W1
- C/1955 L1
- C/1956 E1
- C/1957 P1
- C/1959 X1

Comet Mrkos may also be a partial reference to:

- 18D/Perrine–Mrkos
- 45P/Honda–Mrkos–Pajdušáková
- 143P/Kowal–Mrkos
- C/1953 G1 (Mrkos–Honda)
- C/1948 E1 (Pajdušáková–Mrkos)
