= 2325 Chernykh =

Themistian asteroid

Discovery
- Discovered by: A. Mrkos
- Discovery site: Klet Obs.
- Discovery date: 25 September 1979

Designations
- Named after: Lyudmila Chernykh; Nikolai Chernykh (Russian astronomers)
- Alternative designations: 1979 SP · 1957 UJ; 1959 CH · 1971 FR; 1974 WD_{1} · 1974 XN; 1979 UG_{3}
- Minor planet category: main-belt · (outer); Themis

Orbital characteristics
- Epoch 23 March 2018 (JD 2458200.5)
- Uncertainty parameter 0
- Observation arc: 62.03 yr (22,658 d)
- Aphelion: 3.6909 AU
- Perihelion: 2.5870 AU
- Semi-major axis: 3.1389 AU
- Eccentricity: 0.1758
- Orbital period (sidereal): 5.56 yr (2,031 d)
- Mean anomaly: 281.91°
- Mean motion: 0° 10^{m} 37.92^{s} / day
- Inclination: 1.9199°
- Longitude of ascending node: 139.94°
- Argument of perihelion: 267.37°

Physical characteristics
- Mean diameter: 22.789±0.194 km
- Geometric albedo: 0.065±0.012
- Absolute magnitude (H): 11.9

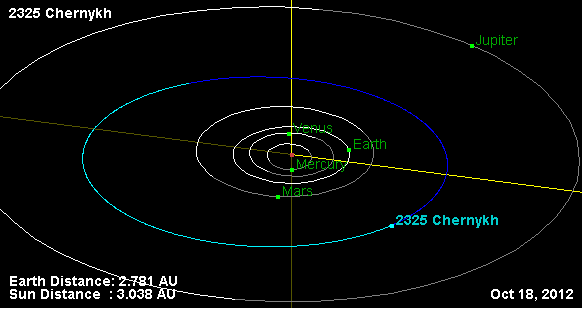
Orbit of asteroid 2325

2325 Chernykh, provisional designation 1979 SP, is a dark Themistian asteroid from the outer regions of the asteroid belt, approximately 23 kilometers (14 miles) in diameter. It was discovered on 25 September 1979, by Czech astronomer Antonín Mrkos at the Klet Observatory in the Czech Republic. The asteroid was named after Russian astronomer couple Lyudmila Chernykh and Nikolai Chernykh.

== Orbit and classification ==
Chernykh is a Themistian asteroid that belongs to the Themis family (602), a very large family of carbonaceous asteroids, named after 24 Themis. It orbits the Sun in the outer main-belt at a distance of 2.6–3.7 AU once every 5 years and 7 months (2,031 days; semi-major axis of 3.14 AU). Its orbit has an eccentricity of 0.18 and an inclination of 2° with respect to the ecliptic. The body's observation arc begins with its first precovery observation at Palomar Observatory in May 1955.

== Physical characteristics ==
Although the asteroid's spectral type is unknown, its albedo indicates a carbonaceous composition, which also agrees with C-type classification for the Themistian asteroids.

According to the survey carried out by the NEOWISE mission of NASA's Wide-field Infrared Survey Explorer, Chernykh measures 22.789 kilometers in diameter and its surface has an albedo of 0.065. As of 2018, no rotational lightcurve of Chernykh has been obtained from photometric observations. The body's rotation period, pole and shape remain unknown.

== Naming ==
This minor planet was named after the Russian astronomers Lyudmila Chernykh (1935–2017) and Nikolai Chernykh (1931–2004), prolific discoverers of minor planets who lead the extensive astrometric program at the discovering Crimean Astrophysical Observatory. The official naming citation was published by the Minor Planet Center on 1 June 1981 (M.P.C. 6060).
