= 2747 Český Krumlov =

Carbonaceous main-belt asteroid

2747 Cesky Krumlov
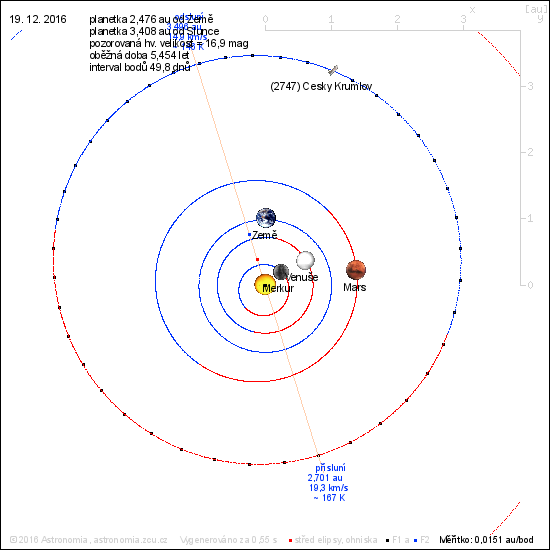
- Orbital diagram of Český Krumlov

Discovery
- Discovered by: A. Mrkos
- Discovery site: Kleť Obs.
- Discovery date: 19 February 1980

Designations
- Pronunciation: Czech: [ˈtʃɛskiː ˈkrʊmlof]
- Named after: Český Krumlov (Czech town)
- Alternative designations: 1980 DW · 1953 FO_{1} 1975 EK_{5} · 1977 SV_{2} 1977 TM_{3} · 1977 TS_{7} 1982 OM
- Minor planet category: main-belt · (outer)

Orbital characteristics
- Epoch 4 September 2017 (JD 2458000.5)
- Uncertainty parameter 0
- Observation arc: 63.93 yr (23,351 days)
- Aphelion: 3.4959 AU
- Perihelion: 2.6996 AU
- Semi-major axis: 3.0978 AU
- Eccentricity: 0.1285
- Orbital period (sidereal): 5.45 yr (1,991 days)
- Mean anomaly: 183.40°
- Mean motion: 0° 10^{m} 50.88^{s} / day
- Inclination: 5.8182°
- Longitude of ascending node: 344.88°
- Argument of perihelion: 302.03°

Physical characteristics
- Dimensions: 20.62 km (calculated); 22.51±6.03 km 22.57±7.52 km 28.39±0.98 km 29.804±0.174 km 32.103±0.239 km 32.63 km 36.33±0.66 km
- Synodic rotation period: 438.7098±9.1557 h
- Geometric albedo: 0.028±0.004; 0.0380±0.004; 0.0393±0.0040; 0.05±0.08; 0.051±0.004; 0.057 (assumed); 0.06±0.07
- Spectral type: X · C
- Absolute magnitude (H): 11.6 · 11.70 · 11.706±0.003 (R) · 11.8 · 11.97±0.27 · 12.16

2747 Český Krumlov (Czech: [ˈtʃɛskiː ˈkrumlof]), provisional designation 1980 DW, is a carbonaceous asteroid and slow rotator from the outer regions of the asteroid belt, approximately 22 kilometers in diameter. It was discovered by Czech astronomer Antonín Mrkos at Kleť Observatory on 19 February 1980, and named for the Czech town of Český Krumlov.

== Orbit and classification ==
Český Krumlov belongs to the Hygiea family. It orbits the Sun in the outer main-belt at a distance of 2.7–3.5 AU once every 5 years and 5 months (1,991 days). Its orbit has an eccentricity of 0.13 and an inclination of 6° with respect to the ecliptic.

It was first identified as 1953 FO_{1} at Almaty Observatory (210) in 1953. The body's observation arc begins four weeks later with a precovery taken at Palomar Observatory, 27 years prior to its official discovery observation at Klet Observatory.

== Physical characteristics ==
Český Krumlov has been characterized as an X-type and carbonaceous C-type asteroid.

=== Slow rotator ===
In October 2010, a rotational lightcurve of Český Krumlov was obtained from photometric observations by astronomers at the Palomar Transient Factory in California. Lightcurve analysis gave a rotation period of 438.7098 hours with a brightness variation of 0.63 magnitude (U=2). This makes it a very slow rotator.

=== Diameter and albedo ===
According to the surveys carried out by the Infrared Astronomical Satellite IRAS, the Japanese Akari satellite, and NASA's Wide-field Infrared Survey Explorer with its subsequent NEOWISE mission, Český Krumlov measures between 22.51 and 36.33 kilometers in diameter and its surface has an albedo between 0.028 and 0.06.

The Collaborative Asteroid Lightcurve Link assumes a standard albedo for carbonaceous asteroids of 0.057 and calculates a diameter of 20.62 kilometers with an absolute magnitude of 12.16.

== Naming ==
This minor planet was named after the historic Czech town of Český Krumlov, near to the location of the discovering Kleť Observatory. The approved naming citation was published by the Minor Planet Center on 29 November 1993 (M.P.C. 22828).
