= 3141 Buchar =

Main-belt asteroid

Discovery
- Discovered by: A. Mrkos
- Discovery site: Kleť Obs.
- Discovery date: 2 September 1984

Designations
- Named after: Emil Buchar (Czech astronomer)
- Alternative designations: 1984 RH · 1952 PE; 1952 RQ · 1953 UF; 1953 VK_{2} · 1977 NM; 1977 OE · 1979 YW_{9} A905 CE
- Minor planet category: main-belt · (outer) background · Cybele

Orbital characteristics
- Epoch 23 March 2018 (JD 2458200.5)
- Uncertainty parameter 0
- Observation arc: 113.21 yr (41,350 d)
- Aphelion: 3.6579 AU
- Perihelion: 3.1382 AU
- Semi-major axis: 3.3980 AU
- Eccentricity: 0.0765
- Orbital period (sidereal): 6.26 yr (2,288 d)
- Mean anomaly: 10.002°
- Mean motion: 0° 9^{m} 26.28^{s} / day
- Inclination: 10.997°
- Longitude of ascending node: 321.13°
- Argument of perihelion: 152.62°

Physical characteristics
- Mean diameter: 35.91 km (derived); 36.05±2.2 km 40.13±0.87 km
- Synodic rotation period: 11.41±0.01 h
- Geometric albedo: 0.0656 (derived); 0.069±0.003; 0.0858±0.012
- Spectral type: D (S3OS2); C (assumed)
- Absolute magnitude (H): 10.50; 10.8

3141 Buchar, provisional designation 1984 RH, is a dark Cybele asteroid from the outermost region of the asteroid belt, approximately 36 kilometers (22 miles) in diameter. It was discovered on 2 September 1984, by Czech astronomer Antonín Mrkos at the Kleť Observatory. The D-type asteroid has a rotation period of 11.4 hours. It was named in memory of Czech astronomer Emil Buchar.

== Orbit and classification ==
Buchar is located in the dynamical region of the Cybele asteroids. It is a non-family asteroid from the main belt's background population. It orbits the Sun in the outermost asteroid belt at a distance of 3.1–3.7 AU once every 6 years and 3 months (2,288 days; semi-major axis of 3.4 AU). Its orbit has an eccentricity of 0.08 and an inclination of 11° with respect to the ecliptic. In February 1905, the asteroid was first observed as A905 CE at Heidelberg Observatory, where the body's observation arc begins with its observation as 1952 RQ in September 1952, or 32 years prior to its official discovery observation at Klet.

== Physical characteristics ==
Buchar has been characterized as dark D-type asteroid in both the Tholen-like and Bus–Binzel-like taxonomy of the Small Solar System Objects Spectroscopic Survey (S3OS2). It is also an assumed C-type asteroid.

=== Rotation period ===
In November 2004, a rotational lightcurve of Buchar was obtained from photometric observations by French amateur astronomer Laurent Bernasconi. Lightcurve analysis gave a rotation period of 11.41 hours with a brightness amplitude of 0.47 magnitude (U=2+).

=== Diameter and albedo ===
According to the surveys carried out by the Infrared Astronomical Satellite IRAS and the Japanese Akari satellite, Buchar measures between 36.05 and 40.13 kilometers in diameter and its surface has an albedo between 0.069 and 0.0858. The Collaborative Asteroid Lightcurve Link derives an albedo of 0.0656 and a diameter of 35.91 kilometers based on an absolute magnitude of 10.8.

== Naming ==
This minor planet was named in memory of Czech astronomer Emil Buchar (1901–1979), discoverer of asteroid 1055 Tynka and one of the pioneers of satellite geodesy. He was a professor of astronomy and geodesy at Czech Technical University in Prague. The official naming citation was published by the Minor Planet Center on 29 November 1993 (M.P.C. 22828).
