= 7742 Altamira =

Asteroid

Discovery
- Discovered by: A. Mrkos
- Discovery site: Kleť Obs.
- Discovery date: 20 October 1985

Designations
- Named after: Cave of Altamira (World Heritage Site)
- Alternative designations: 1985 US · 1996 BP_{2}
- Minor planet category: main-belt · (middle); Henan

Orbital characteristics
- Epoch 4 September 2017 (JD 2458000.5)
- Uncertainty parameter 0
- Observation arc: 31.07 yr (11,349 days)
- Aphelion: 2.9419 AU
- Perihelion: 2.4989 AU
- Semi-major axis: 2.7204 AU
- Eccentricity: 0.0814
- Orbital period (sidereal): 4.49 yr (1,639 days)
- Mean anomaly: 8.9755°
- Mean motion: 0° 13^{m} 10.92^{s} / day
- Inclination: 4.1454°
- Longitude of ascending node: 124.91°
- Argument of perihelion: 293.48°

Physical characteristics
- Dimensions: 6.477±0.174 km 8.74 km (calculated)
- Synodic rotation period: 2.700±0.010 h
- Geometric albedo: 0.057 (assumed); 0.184±0.038
- Spectral type: L · C (assumed)
- Absolute magnitude (H): 13.6 · 13.570±0.090 (R) · 13.64±0.22 · 13.4 · 14.02

7742 Altamira, provisional designation 1985 US, is a Henan asteroid from the central region of the asteroid belt, approximately 7 kilometers in diameter. It was discovered by Czech astronomer Antonín Mrkos at the South Bohemian Kleť Observatory in the Czech Republic, on 20 October 1985. It was named for the Cave of Altamira in Spain.

== Orbit and classification ==
Altamira is a member of the Henan family (532), a large asteroid family in the intermediate main-belt, named after 2085 Henan. It orbits the Sun in the central asteroid belt at a distance of 2.5–2.9 AU once every 4 years and 6 months (1,639 days; semi-major axis of 2.72 AU). Its orbit has an eccentricity of 0.08 and an inclination of 4° with respect to the ecliptic. The body's observation arc begins at Palomar Observatory in May 1988, two and a half years after its official discovery observation at Klet.

== Physical characteristics ==
=== Spectral type ===
Altamira has been characterized as an L-type asteroid by Pan-STARRS photometric survey, which agrees with the overall spectral type for members of the Henan family.

=== Rotation period ===
In January 2014, a rotational lightcurve of Altamira was obtained from photometric observation by astronomers at the Palomar Transient Factory in California. Lightcurve analysis gave a short rotation period of 2.7 hours with a brightness amplitude of 0.11 magnitude (U=2).

=== Diameter and albedo ===
According to the survey carried out by the NEOWISE mission of NASA's Wide-field Infrared Survey Explorer, Altamira measures 6.5 kilometers in diameter, and its surface has an albedo of 0.184. The Collaborative Asteroid Lightcurve Link assumes a standard albedo for carbonaceous asteroids of 0.057 and consequently calculates a larger diameter of 8.7 kilometers.

== Naming ==
This minor planet was named after the famous Cave of Altamira, located in northern Spain. Discovered in 1879, its prehistoric cave paintings feature drawings of wild bison, deer, horses and boar, as well as handprints of the artists who created them. The cave with its paintings has been declared a UNESCO World Heritage Site. The asteroid's name was proposed by Czech astronomer Miloš Tichý. The official naming citation was published by the Minor Planet Center on 24 June 2002 (M.P.C. 46008).
