= 9931 Herbhauptman =

Asteroid

Discovery
- Discovered by: A. Mrkos
- Discovery site: Kleť Obs.
- Discovery date: 18 April 1985

Designations
- Named after: Herbert A. Hauptman (American mathematician)
- Alternative designations: 1985 HH · 1982 QJ_{1} 1996 HA_{1}
- Minor planet category: main-belt · (inner); Nysa–Polana complex

Orbital characteristics
- Epoch 23 March 2018 (JD 2458200.5)
- Uncertainty parameter 0
- Observation arc: 35.60 yr (13,004 d)
- Aphelion: 2.7991 AU
- Perihelion: 1.9573 AU
- Semi-major axis: 2.3782 AU
- Eccentricity: 0.1770
- Orbital period (sidereal): 3.67 yr (1,340 d)
- Mean anomaly: 329.47°
- Mean motion: 0° 16^{m} 7.32^{s} / day
- Inclination: 2.4717°
- Longitude of ascending node: 157.21°
- Argument of perihelion: 80.707°

Physical characteristics
- Mean diameter: 4.54 km (calculated); 5.179±0.368 km
- Synodic rotation period: 4.438±0.0091 h 4.44±0.020 h
- Geometric albedo: 0.20 (assumed); 0.239±0.042
- Spectral type: S
- Absolute magnitude (H): 13.6; 13.629±0.001 (R); 13.660±0.090 (R); 13.7; 14.06±0.32; 14.08

9931 Herbhauptman, provisional designation 1985 HH, is a stony asteroid from the inner regions of the asteroid belt, approximately 5 kilometers (3 miles) in diameter. It was discovered on 18 April 1985, by Czech astronomer Antonín Mrkos at the Kleť Observatory in former Czechoslovakia. The S-type asteroid has a rotation period of 4.44 hours. It was named after American mathematician and Nobel laureate Herbert A. Hauptman.

== Orbit and classification ==
Orbit of Herbhauptman (blue) with the inner planets and Jupiter in red

Herbhauptman is member of the Nysa–Polana complex, a collection of overlapping asteroid families.

It orbits the Sun in the inner main-belt at a distance of 2.0–2.8 AU once every 3 years and 8 months (1,340 days; semi-major axis of 2.38 AU). Its orbit has an eccentricity of 0.18 and an inclination of 2° with respect to the ecliptic. The body's observation arc begins with its first observations as 1982 QJ_{1} at Palomar Observatory in August 1982.

== Physical characteristics ==
Herbhauptman has been characterized as a stony S-type asteroid by Pan-STARRS' survey.

=== Rotation period ===
In 2014, two rotational lightcurves of Herbhauptman have been obtained from photometric observations in the R-band by astronomers at the Palomar Transient Factory in California. Lightcurve analysis gave a rotation period of 4.438 and 4.44 hours with a brightness amplitude of 0.15 and 0.21 magnitude, respectively (U=2/2).

=== Diameter and albedo ===
According to the survey carried out by the NEOWISE mission of NASA's Wide-field Infrared Survey Explorer, Herbhauptman measures 5.179 kilometers in diameter and its surface has an albedo of 0.239, while the Collaborative Asteroid Lightcurve Link assumes a standard albedo for a stony asteroid of 0.20 and calculates a diameter of 4.54 kilometers based on an absolute magnitude of 14.08.

== Naming ==
This minor planet was named after American mathematician Herbert A. Hauptman (1917–2011), who was awarded with the Nobel Prize in Chemistry for developing direct methods for the determination of crystal structures in 1985. The official naming citation was published by the Minor Planet Center on 28 September 2004 (M.P.C. 52767).
