= 4090 Říšehvězd =

Main-belt steroid

Discovery
- Discovered by: A. Mrkos
- Discovery site: Kleť Obs.
- Discovery date: 2 September 1986

Designations
- Named after: Říše hvězd (astronomy journal)
- Alternative designations: 1986 RH_{1} · 1931 FF; 1971 KB · 1982 KX; 1988 AR_{3} · 1989 GU
- Minor planet category: main-belt · (inner)

Orbital characteristics
- Epoch 4 September 2017 (JD 2458000.5)
- Uncertainty parameter 0
- Observation arc: 86.03 yr (31,421 days)
- Aphelion: 2.8513 AU
- Perihelion: 1.8632 AU
- Semi-major axis: 2.3573 AU
- Eccentricity: 0.2096
- Orbital period (sidereal): 3.62 yr (1,322 days)
- Mean anomaly: 252.91°
- Mean motion: 0° 16^{m} 20.28^{s} / day
- Inclination: 1.3288°
- Longitude of ascending node: 266.55°
- Argument of perihelion: 4.4078°

Physical characteristics
- Dimensions: 6.27 km (calculated); 7.195±0.299 km
- Synodic rotation period: 4.5312±0.0090 h (R); 4.550±0.020 h (R); 4.5553±0.0090 h (R)
- Geometric albedo: 0.149±0.032; 0.20 (assumed)
- Spectral type: S
- Absolute magnitude (H): 12.91±0.24 · 13.080±0.160 (R) · 13.114±0.002 (R) · 13.2 · 13.38 · 13.4

4090 Říšehvězd, provisional designation 1986 RH_{1}, is a stony asteroid from the inner regions of the asteroid belt, approximately 7 kilometers in diameter.

It was discovered by Czech astronomer Antonín Mrkos at Kleť Observatory on 2 September 1986. Named for the astronomy journal Říše hvězd, it is known as having had the most diacritics in its name among all named minor planets before the naming of 229762 Gǃkúnǁʼhòmdímà.

== Classification and orbit ==
The S-type asteroid orbits the Sun at a distance of 1.9–2.9 AU once every 3 years and 7 months (1,322 days). Its orbit has an eccentricity of 0.21 and an inclination of 1° with respect to the ecliptic. The first observation was made at the U.S. Yerkes Observatory in 1931, extending the asteroid's observation arc by 55 years prior to its official discovery.

== Physical characteristics ==
In 2009 and 2014, several rotational lightcurves were obtained for this asteroid at the Palomar Transient Factory. They gave a concurring rotation period between 4.53 and 4.56 hours with a brightness variation between 0.32 and 0.41 magnitude (U=2/2/2).

According to the survey carried out by the NEOWISE mission of NASA's Wide-field Infrared Survey Explorer, the asteroid measures 7.2 kilometers in diameter and its surface has an albedo of 0.149, while the Collaborative Asteroid Lightcurve Link assumes a standard albedo for stony asteroids of 0.20 and calculates a diameter of 6.3 kilometers, based on an absolute magnitude of 13.38.

== Naming ==
This minor planet was named after the periodically released Czech popular astronomy journal Říše hvězd ("the realm of stars"), which was initially published by the Czech Astronomical Society.

Říše hvězd reported discoveries in the fields of astronomy, astrophysics and space exploration and supplied information about the Czech–Slovak astronomical community. The body's name was proposed by Jana Tichá, Miloš Tichý and Zdeněk Moravec. Naming citation was published on 28 August 1996 (M.P.C. 27734).

== See also ==
- Jiří Grygar, chairman of the Czech Astronomical Society and editor at Říše hvězd
