= 11020 Orwell =

Main-belt background asteroid

Discovery
- Discovered by: A. Mrkos
- Discovery site: Kleť Obs.
- Discovery date: 31 July 1984

Designations
- Named after: George Orwell (English writer)
- Alternative designations: 1984 OG · 1979 SA_{9} 1999 GL_{5}
- Minor planet category: main-belt · (outer) background

Orbital characteristics
- Epoch 4 September 2017 (JD 2458000.5)
- Uncertainty parameter 0
- Observation arc: 36.93 yr (13,487 days)
- Aphelion: 3.5620 AU
- Perihelion: 2.6377 AU
- Semi-major axis: 3.0998 AU
- Eccentricity: 0.1491
- Orbital period (sidereal): 5.46 yr (1,993 days)
- Mean anomaly: 48.167°
- Mean motion: 0° 10^{m} 50.16^{s} / day
- Inclination: 3.0130°
- Longitude of ascending node: 153.87°
- Argument of perihelion: 136.87°

Physical characteristics
- Dimensions: 14.466±0.115 km
- Geometric albedo: 0.089±0.004
- Absolute magnitude (H): 12.6

11020 Orwell (provisional designation 1984 OG) is a background asteroid from the outer regions of the asteroid belt, approximately 14 kilometers in diameter. It was discovered on 31 July 1984, by Czech astronomer Antonín Mrkos at Kleť Observatory in the Czech Republic. The asteroid was named after English writer George Orwell.

== Classification and orbit ==
Orwell orbits the Sun in the outer main-belt at a distance of 2.6–3.6 AU once every 5 years and 6 months (1,993 days). Its orbit has an eccentricity of 0.15 and an inclination of 3° with respect to the ecliptic. It was first observed as 1979 SA_{9} at Crimea–Nauchnij in 1979, extending the body's observation arc by 5 years prior to its official discovery observation at Klet.

== Physical characteristics ==
According to the survey carried out by NASA's Wide-field Infrared Survey Explorer with its subsequent NEOWISE mission, Orwell measures 14.466 kilometers in diameter and its surface has an albedo of 0.089. It has an absolute magnitude of 12.6.

=== Lightcurves ===
As of 2017, Orwell's spectral type, as well as its rotation period and shape remain unknown.

== Naming ==
This minor planet was named for British writer Eric Blair (1903–1950), better known by his pen name George Orwell, who is associated with the year of the object's discovery, 1984, due to his dystopian novel Nineteen Eighty-Four, which explores the dangers of totalitarian rule. He is also known for the novel Animal Farm. The name was proposed by Czech astronomer Jana Tichá at Klet and supported by Brian G. Marsden. The approved naming citation was published by the Minor Planet Center on 23 May 2000 (M.P.C. 40705).
