= 5026 Martes =

Asteroid

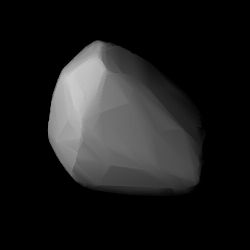
- Shape model of Martes from its lightcurve

Discovery
- Discovered by: A. Mrkos
- Discovery site: Kleť Obs.
- Discovery date: 22 August 1987

Designations
- Pronunciation: /ˈmɑːrtɪs/
- Named after: pine marten beech marten (Mustelidae mammals)
- Alternative designations: 1987 QL_{1} · 1965 QE; 1976 QL · 1980 VA_{2}
- Minor planet category: main-belt · (inner)

Orbital characteristics
- Epoch 4 September 2017 (JD 2458000.5)
- Uncertainty parameter 0
- Observation arc: 63.37 yr (23,145 days)
- Aphelion: 2.9540 AU
- Perihelion: 1.8020 AU
- Semi-major axis: 2.3780 AU
- Eccentricity: 0.2422
- Orbital period (sidereal): 3.67 yr (1,339 days)
- Mean anomaly: 75.131°
- Mean motion: 0° 16^{m} 7.68^{s} / day
- Inclination: 4.2831°
- Longitude of ascending node: 304.77°
- Argument of perihelion: 17.652°

Physical characteristics
- Mean diameter: 4.93 km (calculated); 8.967±2.335 km
- Synodic rotation period: 4.423±0.0011 h 4.424087±0.000002 h 4.4243±0.005 h
- Geometric albedo: 0.066±0.072; 0.20 (assumed)
- Spectral type: B–V = 0.863±0.042; V–R = 0.440±0.047; C · S
- Absolute magnitude (H): 13.80 · 13.9 · 14.065±0.010 (R) · 14.17±0.36

5026 Martes (prov. designation: 1987 QL_{1}) is a carbonaceous asteroid from the inner region of the asteroid belt, approximately 9 kilometers (6 miles) in diameter. It was discovered on 22 August 1987, by Czech astronomer Antonín Mrkos at Kleť Observatory in the Czech Republic. It is named after the two weasel-like animal species: pine marten and beech marten.

== Orbit and classification ==
Martes is the namesake member of a small asteroid family, named the Martes family. It orbits the Sun in the inner main-belt at a distance of 1.8–3.0 AU once every 3 years and 8 months (1,339 days). Its orbit has an eccentricity of 0.24 and an inclination of 4° with respect to the ecliptic.

A first precovery was taken at Palomar Observatory in 1953, extending the body's observation arc by 34 years prior to its official discovery observation at Klet.

== Naming ==
This minor planet was named for the two species of the family Mustelidae, the pine marten and beech marten. They also live in the forests near the discovering Kleť Observatory. The official naming citation was published by the Minor Planet Center on 22 June 1999 (M.P.C. 34920).

== Physical characteristics ==
Martes has been characterized as a carbonaceous C-type asteroid by PanSTARRS' photometric survey.

=== Asteroid pair ===
Martes forms an asteroid pair with 2005 WW_{113}, and was part of the 35 sample asteroid pairs in Petr Pravec's study Formation of asteroid pairs by rotational fission, published in the journal Nature.

=== Lightcurves ===
Between 2008 and 2010, several rotational lightcurves of Martes were obtained from photometric observations. Lightcurve analysis gave a well-defined rotation period of 4.4243 hours with a brightness amplitude of 0.69 magnitude (U=3-/3/2+/3/2).

=== Diameter and albedo ===
According to the survey carried out by NASA's Wide-field Infrared Survey Explorer with its subsequent NEOWISE mission, Martes measures 8.967 kilometers in diameter and its surface has an albedo of 0.066, which is typical for carbonaceous asteroids. The Collaborative Asteroid Lightcurve Link, however, assumes a standard albedo for stony asteroids of 0.20 and consequently calculates a much smaller diameter of 4.93 kilometers, due to the higher albedo.
