= 3905 Doppler =

Main belt asteroid

Discovery
- Discovered by: A. Mrkos
- Discovery site: Kleť Obs.
- Discovery date: 28 August 1984

Designations
- Pronunciation: /ˈdɒplər/
- Named after: Christian Doppler (Austrian physicist)
- Alternative designations: 1984 QO · 1980 RP_{2}
- Minor planet category: main-belt

Orbital characteristics
- Epoch 4 September 2017 (JD 2458000.5)
- Uncertainty parameter 0
- Observation arc: 35.81 yr (13,078 days)
- Aphelion: 3.2190 AU
- Perihelion: 1.9001 AU
- Semi-major axis: 2.5596 AU
- Eccentricity: 0.2577
- Orbital period (sidereal): 4.10 yr (1,496 days)
- Mean anomaly: 320.23°
- Mean motion: 0° 14^{m} 26.52^{s} / day
- Inclination: 14.192°
- Longitude of ascending node: 343.32°
- Argument of perihelion: 90.823°
- Known satellites: 1

Physical characteristics
- Dimensions: 8.021±0.047 km
- Synodic rotation period: 50.8±0.1 h
- Geometric albedo: 0.228±0.040
- Spectral type: S
- Absolute magnitude (H): 12.6

3905 Doppler, provisional designation 1984 QO, is a stony asteroid and binary system from the middle region of the asteroid belt, approximately 8 kilometers in diameter.

The asteroid was discovered on 28 August 1984, by Czech astronomer Antonín Mrkos at Kleť Observatory and named after physicist Christian Doppler.

== Orbit and characterization ==
Doppler orbits the Sun in the central main-belt at a distance of 1.9–3.2 AU once every 4 years and 1 month (1,496 days). Its orbit has an eccentricity of 0.26 and an inclination of 14° with respect to the ecliptic. It has been characterized as a common S-type asteroid.

A minor-planet moon orbiting Doppler every 50.8 hours (or 2 days, 2 hours, and 48 minutes) was found orbiting the asteroid in 2013. This is fairly long orbital period for a moon of an asteroid of this size. The satellite's orbital period is identical to the primary's rotation period (F-type binary).

According to the survey carried out by NASA's Wide-field Infrared Survey Explorer with its subsequent NEOWISE mission, Doppler measures 8.021 kilometers in diameter and its surface has an albedo of 0.228, while the Collaborative Asteroid Lightcurve Link assumes a standard albedo for stony asteroids of 0.20 and calculates a diameter of 8.97 kilometers with an absolute magnitude of 12.6.

== Naming ==
This minor planet was named after Christian Doppler (1803–1853), Austrian physicist in Vienna and well known for the Doppler effect, which he first described in 1842, in his book "Ueber das farbige Licht der Doppelsterne". The naming was proposed by Jana Tichá and M. Šolc. The approved naming citation was published by the Minor Planet Center on 28 August 1996 (M.P.C. 27734).
