= 6433 Enya =

Stony background asteroid from the inner regions of the asteroid belt

Discovery
- Discovered by: A. Mrkos
- Discovery site: Kleť Obs.
- Discovery date: 18 November 1978

Designations
- Named after: Enya (Irish musician)
- Alternative designations: 1978 WC · 1952 UH; 1989 WZ_{4}
- Minor planet category: main-belt · (inner) background

Orbital characteristics
- Epoch 4 September 2017 (JD 2458000.5)
- Uncertainty parameter 0
- Observation arc: 64.53 yr (23,568 days)
- Aphelion: 2.9085 AU
- Perihelion: 1.8673 AU
- Semi-major axis: 2.3879 AU
- Eccentricity: 0.2180
- Orbital period (sidereal): 3.69 yr (1,348 days)
- Mean anomaly: 191.23°
- Mean motion: 0° 16^{m} 1.56^{s} / day
- Inclination: 8.6309°
- Longitude of ascending node: 87.329°
- Argument of perihelion: 317.28°

Physical characteristics
- Dimensions: 3.68 km (calculated); 6.69±0.97 km 7.08±1.79 km 7.416±0.165 km
- Synodic rotation period: 7.400±0.0064 h
- Geometric albedo: 0.06±0.04; 0.081±0.012; 0.090±0.025; 0.20 (assumed)
- Spectral type: S
- Absolute magnitude (H): 14.0 · 14.00±0.55 · 14.087±0.003 (R) · 14.10 · 14.3 · 14.37 · 14.54

6433 Enya, provisional designation 1978 WC, is a stony background asteroid from the inner regions of the asteroid belt, approximately 7 kilometers (4.3 miles) in diameter. It was discovered on 18 November 1978, by Czech astronomer Antonín Mrkos at the Kleť Observatory in the Czech Republic. It was named for Irish musician Enya.

== Orbit and classification ==
Enya is a non-family asteroid from the main belt's background population. It orbits the Sun in the inner asteroid belt at a distance of 1.9–2.9 AU once every 3 years and 8 months (1,348 days). Its orbit has an eccentricity of 0.22 and an inclination of 9° with respect to the ecliptic. Enya was first identified as 1952 UH at Goethe Link Observatory in 1952. The body's observation arc, however, begins with its official discovery observation at Kleť in 1978.

== Physical characteristics ==
Enya is a presumed S-type asteroid.

=== Rotation period ===
In March 2013, a fragmentary rotational lightcurve of Enya was obtained from photometric observations at the Palomar Transient Factory in California. Lightcurve analysis gave a rotation period of 7.4 hours with a brightness variation of 0.08 magnitude (U=1).

As of 2017, no other lightcurve has since been obtained from Enya.

=== Diameter and albedo ===
According to the survey carried out by NASA's Wide-field Infrared Survey Explorer with its subsequent NEOWISE mission, Enya measures between 6.69 and 7.416 kilometers in diameter, and its surface has an albedo between 0.012 and 0.090.

The Collaborative Asteroid Lightcurve Link assumes a standard albedo for stony asteroids of 0.20 and calculates a diameter of 3.68 kilometers with an absolute magnitude of 14.54.

== Naming ==
This minor planet was named after Eithne Pádraigín Ní Bhraonáin (born 1961), known as Enya, an Irish singer, songwriter, musician, and producer. Naming was proposed by G. V. Williams and published on 20 June 1997 (M.P.C. 30099).
