= 6546 Kaye =

Main-belt asteroid

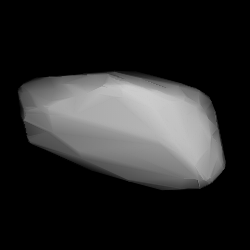
- Shape model of Kaye from its lightcurve

Discovery
- Discovered by: A. Mrkos
- Discovery site: Kleť Obs.
- Discovery date: 24 February 1987

Designations
- Named after: Danny Kaye (American actor and singer)
- Alternative designations: 1987 DY_{4} · 1978 RF_{2} 1991 XM_{1}
- Minor planet category: main-belt · (outer); background · Ursula

Orbital characteristics
- Epoch 4 September 2017 (JD 2458000.5)
- Uncertainty parameter 0
- Observation arc: 37.86 yr (13,828 days)
- Aphelion: 3.5611 AU
- Perihelion: 2.8844 AU
- Semi-major axis: 3.2228 AU
- Eccentricity: 0.1050
- Orbital period (sidereal): 5.79 yr (2,113 days)
- Mean anomaly: 80.178°
- Mean motion: 0° 10^{m} 13.44^{s} / day
- Inclination: 14.414°
- Longitude of ascending node: 274.80°
- Argument of perihelion: 272.41°

Physical characteristics
- Mean diameter: 21.624±0.174 km 23.21 km (calculated); 23.757±0.186 km
- Synodic rotation period: 10.0059±0.0569 h (S); 10.0186±0.0569 h (R)
- Geometric albedo: 0.057 (assumed); 0.0656±0.0078; 0.085±0.015
- Spectral type: C (assumed)
- Absolute magnitude (H): 11.7 · 11.9 · 11.986±0.003 (R) · 12.392±0.003 (S)

6546 Kaye (prov. designation: 1987 DY_{4}) is a dark and elongated background asteroid from the outer region of the asteroid belt. It was discovered on 24 February 1987, by Czech astronomer Antonín Mrkos at the South Bohemian Kleť Observatory in the Czech Republic. The presumed C-type asteroid has a rotation period of 10.0 hours and measures approximately 22 kilometers (14 miles) in diameter. It was named for American actor Danny Kaye.

== Orbit and classification ==
When applying the synthetic hierarchical clustering method (HCM) by Nesvorný, or the 1995 HCM-analysis by Zappalà, Kaye is a non-family asteroid of the main belt's background population, while according to another HCM-analysis by Milani and Knežević (AstDyS), it is a core member of the Ursula family (631), a family of 1,500 asteroids with a C- and X-type.

It orbits the Sun in the outer main-belt at a distance of 2.9–3.6 AU once every 5 years and 9 months (2,113 days). Its orbit has an eccentricity of 0.11 and an inclination of 14° with respect to the ecliptic. It was first observed as 1978 RF_{2} at Crimea–Nauchnij in 1978, extending the body's observation arc by 9 years prior to its official discovery observation at Kleť Observatory.

== Naming ==
This minor planet was named in memory of American actor and singer David Daniel Kaminsky (1911–1987), known by his screen name as "Danny Kaye". Kaye starred in popular feature films such as The Court Jester (1956), typically playing the role of a gentle bumbler who triumphs eventually. The minor planet's name was suggested by G. V. Williams, who made the identifications for this body. The approved naming citation was published by the Minor Planet Center on 20 June 1997 (M.P.C. 30099).

== Physical characteristics ==
=== Rotation period ===
In August 2012, two rotational lightcurves of Kaye were obtained from photometric observations at the Palomar Transient Factory in California. Lightcurve analysis gave a rotation period of 10.0059±0.0569 and 10.0186±0.0569 hours with a brightness variation of 0.32 and 0.34 magnitude in the R and S-band, respectively (U=2/2).

=== Diameter and albedo ===
According to the survey carried out by NASA's Wide-field Infrared Survey Explorer with its subsequent NEOWISE mission, Kaye measures between 21.6 and 23.8 kilometers in diameter and its surface has an albedo between 0.065 and 0.085. The Collaborative Asteroid Lightcurve Link assumes a standard albedo for carbonaceous asteroids of 0.057 and calculates a diameter of 23.2 kilometers with an absolute magnitude of 11.9.
