= 6377 Cagney =

Carbonaceous main-belt asteroid

Discovery
- Discovered by: A. Mrkos
- Discovery site: Kleť Obs.
- Discovery date: 25 June 1987

Designations
- Named after: James Cagney (American actor and dancer)
- Alternative designations: 1987 ML_{1} · 1953 LA; 1991 GF_{2}
- Minor planet category: main-belt · Eunomia

Orbital characteristics
- Epoch 4 September 2017 (JD 2458000.5)
- Uncertainty parameter 0
- Observation arc: 65.36 yr (23,871 days)
- Aphelion: 3.0383 AU
- Perihelion: 2.2031 AU
- Semi-major axis: 2.6207 AU
- Eccentricity: 0.1593
- Orbital period (sidereal): 4.24 yr (1,550 days)
- Mean anomaly: 65.816°
- Mean motion: 0° 13^{m} 56.28^{s} / day
- Inclination: 15.444°
- Longitude of ascending node: 125.33°
- Argument of perihelion: 115.32°

Physical characteristics
- Dimensions: 8.76 km (calculated); 9.38±2.91 km
- Synodic rotation period: 4.171±0.003 h
- Geometric albedo: 0.16±0.11; 0.21 (assumed)
- Spectral type: C
- Absolute magnitude (H): 12.6 · 12.76 · 12.79±0.59

6377 Cagney, provisional designation 1987 ML_{1}, is a carbonaceous Eunomia asteroid from the central region of the asteroid belt, approximately 9 kilometers in diameter.

The asteroid was discovered on 25 June 1987, by Czech astronomer Antonín Mrkos at South Bohemian Kleť Observatory in the Czech Republic. It was named after American actor and dancer James Cagney.

== Orbit and classification ==
Cagney is a member of the Eunomia family, the most prominent family of otherwise stony asteroids in the intermediate main-belt. It orbits the Sun at a distance of 2.2–3.0 AU once every 4 years and 3 months (1,550 days). Its orbit has an eccentricity of 0.16 and an inclination of 15° with respect to the ecliptic.

A first precovery was taken at Palomar Observatory in 1951, extending the body's observation arc by 36 years prior to its official discovery observation at Klet.

== Physical characteristics ==
Cagney has been characterized as a carbonaceous C-type asteroid by PanSTARRS' photometric survey.

=== Lightcurve ===
A rotational lightcurve of Cagney was obtained by Slovak astronomer Adrián Galád at Modra Observatory in February 2008. Lightcurve analysis gave a well-defined rotation period of 4.171 hours with a brightness variation of 0.20 magnitude (U=3).

=== Diameter and albedo ===
According to the survey carried out by the NEOWISE mission of NASA's Wide-field Infrared Survey Explorer, Cagney measures 9.38 kilometers in diameter and its surface has an albedo of 0.16.

The Collaborative Asteroid Lightcurve Link assumes an albedo of 0.21 (which is typical for stony asteroids) and calculates a diameter of 8.76 kilometers with an absolute magnitude of 12.6.

== Naming ==
This minor planet was named in memory of American actor and dancer James Cagney (1899–1986), remembered best for playing multifaceted tough guys in movies such as The Public Enemy (1931) and Angels with Dirty Faces (1938).

In 1942, Cagney won the Oscar for his energetic portrayal of George M. Cohan in Yankee Doodle Dandy. The official naming citation was published by the Minor Planet Center on 20 June 1997 (M.P.C. 30098).
