= 1832 Mrkos =

Carbonaceous main-belt asteroid

Discovery
- Discovered by: L. Chernykh
- Discovery site: Crimean Astrophysical Obs.
- Discovery date: 11 August 1969

Designations
- Pronunciation: /ˈmɜːrkɒs/
- Named after: Antonín Mrkos (astronomer)
- Alternative designations: 1969 PC · 1937 CJ
- Minor planet category: main-belt · (outer)

Orbital characteristics
- Epoch 4 September 2017 (JD 2458000.5)
- Uncertainty parameter 0
- Observation arc: 80.14 yr (29,272 days)
- Aphelion: 3.5486 AU
- Perihelion: 2.8778 AU
- Semi-major axis: 3.2132 AU
- Eccentricity: 0.1044
- Orbital period (sidereal): 5.76 yr (2,104 days)
- Mean anomaly: 86.782°
- Mean motion: 0° 10^{m} 15.96^{s} / day
- Inclination: 14.947°
- Longitude of ascending node: 303.42°
- Argument of perihelion: 81.647°

Physical characteristics
- Dimensions: 27.18±1.23 km 29.35±0.38 km 30.67 km (derived); 30.78±2.4 km
- Synodic rotation period: 13.64±0.01 h
- Geometric albedo: 0.0567 (derived); 0.068±0.010; 0.0742±0.013; 0.097±0.010
- Spectral type: C
- Absolute magnitude (H): 11.0 · 11.20 · 11.3 · 11.55±0.21

1832 Mrkos, provisional designation 1969 PC, is a carbonaceous asteroid from the outer region of the asteroid belt, approximately 30 kilometers in diameter. It was discovered on 11 August 1969 by Russian astronomer Lyudmila Chernykh at the Crimean Astrophysical Observatory in Nauchnyj, on the Crimean peninsula. It was named after Czech astronomer Antonín Mrkos.

== Orbit and classification ==
The C-type asteroid orbits the Sun in the outer main-belt at a distance of 2.9–3.5 AU once every 5 years and 9 months (2,104 days). Its orbit has an eccentricity of 0.10 and an inclination of 15° with respect to the ecliptic. Mrkos was first observed and identified as 1937 CJ at Yerkes Observatory in 1937, extending the body's observation arc by 32 years prior to its official discovery observation.

== Physical characteristics ==
=== Rotation period ===
In October 2004, a rotational lightcurve for Mrkos was obtained from photometric observations taken by American astronomer Brian Warner at his Palmer Divide Observatory in Colorado. It gave a rotation period of 13.64 hours with a brightness variation of 0.18 in magnitude (U=3-).

=== Diameter and albedo ===
According to the surveys carried out by the Infrared Astronomical Satellite IRAS, the Japanese Akari satellite, and NASA's Wide-field Infrared Survey Explorer with its subsequent NEOWISE mission, Mrkos measures between 27.18 and 30.78 kilometers in diameter, and its surface has an albedo between 0.068 and 0.097. The Collaborative Asteroid Lightcurve Link derives an albedo of 0.0567 and a diameter of 30.67 kilometers with an absolute magnitude of 11.3.

== Naming ==
This minor planet was named in honor of Czech astronomer Antonín Mrkos (1918–1996), a prolific discoverer of 273 minor planets and well known for his contributions to cometary astronomy. He was the director of the Kleť Observatory in what is now the Czech Republic, initiated the first minor planet survey in his country, was a professor at Charles University in Prague and University of South Bohemia, and a participant of a Soviet Antarctic expedition in the late 1950s. The official naming citation was published by the Minor Planet Center on 1 June 1975 (M.P.C. 3825).
