= 6223 Dahl =

Main-belt asteroid

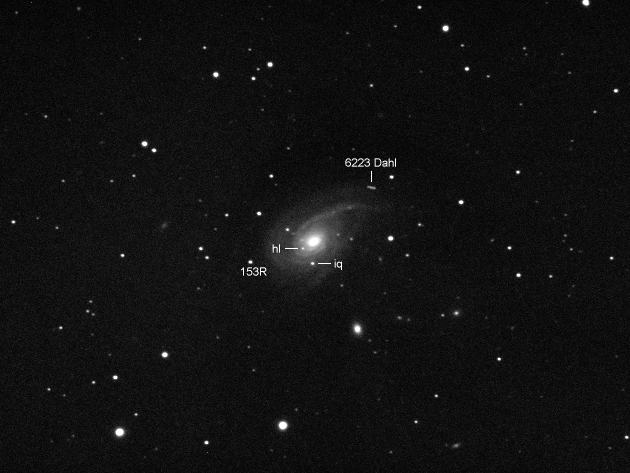
- Track of Dahl next to NGC 772 with two supernovae

Discovery
- Discovered by: A. Mrkos
- Discovery site: Kleť Obs.
- Discovery date: 3 September 1980

Designations
- Named after: Roald Dahl (Welsh author)
- Alternative designations: 1980 RD_{1} · 1949 XC; 1972 YS · 1976 UV_{3} 1982 BH_{9} · 1991 AK_{3}
- Minor planet category: main-belt · (middle)

Orbital characteristics
- Epoch 4 September 2017 (JD 2458000.5)
- Uncertainty parameter 0
- Observation arc: 67.02 yr (24,479 days)
- Aphelion: 3.0674 AU
- Perihelion: 2.4039 AU
- Semi-major axis: 2.7356 AU
- Eccentricity: 0.1213
- Orbital period (sidereal): 4.52 yr (1,653 days)
- Mean anomaly: 38.698°
- Mean motion: 0° 13^{m} 4.08^{s} / day
- Inclination: 3.8564°
- Longitude of ascending node: 294.31°
- Argument of perihelion: 76.334°

Physical characteristics
- Dimensions: 16.81 km (calculated); 19.634±0.326 km
- Synodic rotation period: 3.33±0.01 h
- Geometric albedo: 0.033±0.004; 0.0335±0.0040; 0.057 (assumed)
- Spectral type: C
- Absolute magnitude (H): 12.6

6223 Dahl, provisional designation 1980 RD_{1}, is a carbonaceous asteroid from the central region of the asteroid belt, approximately 18 kilometres in diameter. It was discovered on 3 September 1980, by Czech astronomer Antonín Mrkos at Kleť Observatory near České Budějovice in the Czech Republic. The asteroid was named after author of children's books, Roald Dahl.

== Orbit and classification ==
Dahl orbits the Sun in the central main-belt at a distance of 2.4–3.1 AU once every 4 years and 6 months (1,653 days). Its orbit has an eccentricity of 0.12 and an inclination of 4° with respect to the ecliptic. The first precovery was taken at the US Goethe Link Observatory in 1949, extending the asteroid's observation arc by 31 years prior to its discovery.

== Physical characteristics ==
Dahl has been characterised as a dark, carbonaceous C-type asteroid.

=== Lightcurves ===
In November 2011, a rotational lightcurve of Dahl was obtained by Brett Waller at the Cedar Green Observatory in Virginia in the United States. It gave a rotation period of 3.33±0.01 hours with a brightness variation of 0.43 in magnitude (U=2).

=== Diameter and albedo ===
According to the survey carried out by the NEOWISE mission of NASA's Wide-field Infrared Survey Explorer, Dahl measures 19.6 kilometres in diameter and its surface has a low albedo of 0.034, while the Collaborative Asteroid Lightcurve Link assumes a standard albedo for carbonaceous asteroids of 0.057 and calculates a diameter of 16.8 kilometres, as the higher the albedo (reflectivity), the lower a body's diameter for certain absolute magnitude.

== Naming ==
This minor planet was named in memory of the Welsh author Roald Dahl (1916–1990), known for his classic children's books Willy Wonka and the Chocolate Factory and James and the Giant Peach. The approved naming citation was published by the Minor Planet Center on 28 August 1996 (M.P.C. 27735).
