= C/1955 L1 (Mrkos) =

Long-period comet

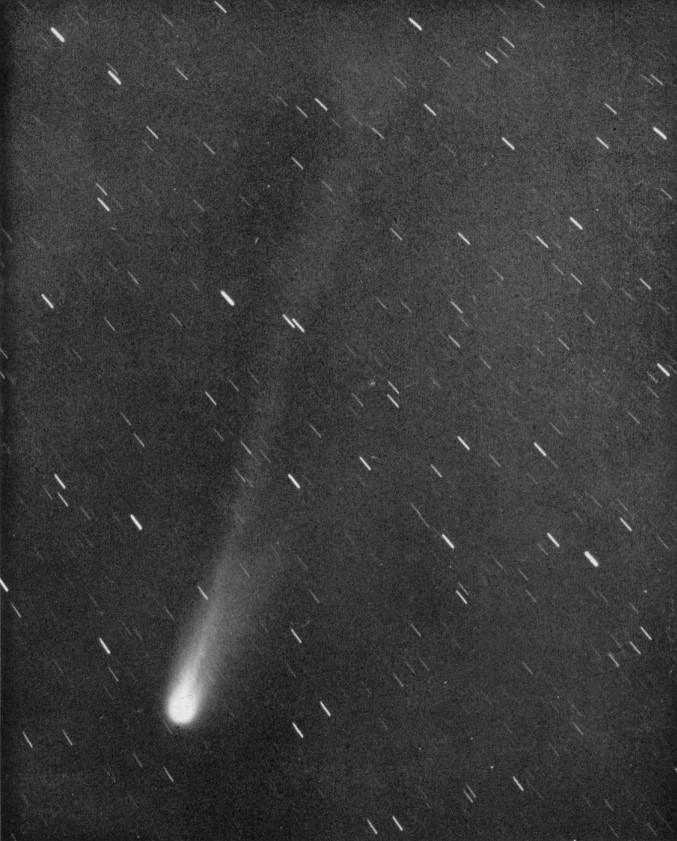
- Comet Mrkos photographed by Elizabeth Roemer from the Lick Observatory on 17 June 1955.

Discovery
- Discovered by: Antonín Mrkos
- Discovery site: Lomnický štít, Czechoslovakia
- Discovery date: 12 June 1955

Designations
- Alternative designations: 1955 III, 1955e

Orbital characteristics
- Epoch: 14 July 1955 (JD 2435302.5)
- Observation arc: 84 days
- Number of observations: 21
- Aphelion: 98.547 AU
- Perihelion: 0.534 AU
- Semi-major axis: 49.540 AU
- Eccentricity: 0.98921
- Orbital period: ~350 years
- Inclination: 86.503°
- Longitude of ascending node: 48.942°
- Argument of periapsis: 32.506°
- Mean anomaly: 0.113°
- Last perihelion: 4 June 1955
- Next perihelion: ~2300s
- T_{Jupiter}: 0.160
- Earth MOID: 0.399 AU
- Jupiter MOID: 0.192 AU

Physical characteristics
- Comet nuclear magnitude (M2): 6.6
- Apparent magnitude: 4.5 (1955 apparition)

Comet Mrkos, formally designated as C/1955 L1, is a long-period comet with an approximately 350-year orbit around the Sun. It is one of several comets discovered by Czech astronomer, Antonín Mrkos.
