= 143P/Kowal–Mrkos =

Jupiter-family comet

Discovery
- Discovered by: Charles T. Kowal; Antonín Mrkos
- Discovery site: Palomar Observatory; Klet' Observatory
- Discovery date: 2 May 1984

Designations
- MPC designation: D/1984 H1; P/1984 JD; P/2000 ET_{90}
- Alternative designations: 1984 X, 1984n

Orbital characteristics
- Epoch: 5 May 2025 (JD 2460800.5)
- Observation arc: 40.83 years
- Earliest precovery date: 23 April 1984
- Number of observations: 1,231
- Aphelion: 6.618 AU
- Perihelion: 2.942 AU
- Semi-major axis: 4.780 AU
- Eccentricity: 0.38458
- Orbital period: 10.451 years
- Inclination: 5.472°
- Longitude of ascending node: 242.62°
- Argument of periapsis: 304.32°
- Mean anomaly: 303.47°
- Last perihelion: 7 May 2018
- Next perihelion: 28 December 2026
- T_{Jupiter}: 2.864
- Earth MOID: 1.537 AU
- Jupiter MOID: 0.019 AU

Physical characteristics
- Mean radius: 5.7±0.6 km
- Synodic rotation period: 17.21±0.10 hours
- Spectral type: (V–R) = 0.58±0.02
- Comet total magnitude (M1): 14.5

143P/Kowal–Mrkos is a periodic comet in the Solar System. The comet reaches perihelion on 28 December 2026 and then makes closest approach to Earth on 19 April 2027 when it will be 2 AU from Earth with an apparent magnitude of about 18.

== Observational history ==
=== Discovery and loss ===
Antonín Mrkos first reported the discovery of this comet as an asteroid named 1984 JD, after spotting it as a 16th-magnitude object on the night of 2 May 1984. In September 1984, Charles T. Kowal analyzed photographic plates exposed on the night of 23 April 1984 and he noted the comet as almost stellar-like, with a faint but discernible coma. Brian G. Marsden immediately recognized that Kowal's object is identical to that of Mrkos' discovery, allowing him to calculate an elliptical orbit for the object, which allowed Mrkos to notice that he indeed captured faint cometary activity on images he took on 19 May. However, it was not observed beyond that date, and was initially considered lost, subsequently redesignated as D/1984 H1.

=== Recovery ===
It was not observed during the comet's predicted apparition in 1992. Shuichi Nakano later revised his orbital calculations for the comet in 1997, which allowed him to predict that the comet may next return by 2000. It was successfully recovered on 9 March 2000, when LINEAR and LONEOS spotted an asteroid-like object with a comet-like orbit (2000 ET_{90}), which Marsden noted matched those predicted for Kowal–Mrkos.

Numbered comets
Previous; 142P/Ge–Wang	143P/Kowal–Mrkos	Next; 144P/Kushida
