= 6615 Plutarchos =

Main-belt asteroid

Discovery
- Discovered by: C. J. van Houten; I. van Houten-G. T. Gehrels
- Discovery site: Palomar Obs.
- Discovery date: 17 October 1960

Designations
- Pronunciation: /pluːˈtɑːrkəs/
- Named after: Plutarch (Greek philosopher)
- Alternative designations: 9512 P-L · 1991 EW
- Minor planet category: main-belt · Flora
- Adjectives: Plutarchian /pluːˈtɑːrkiən/

Orbital characteristics
- Epoch 4 September 2017 (JD 2458000.5)
- Uncertainty parameter 0
- Observation arc: 55.42 yr (20,242 days)
- Aphelion: 2.4440 AU
- Perihelion: 1.8951 AU
- Semi-major axis: 2.1695 AU
- Eccentricity: 0.1265
- Orbital period (sidereal): 3.20 yr (1,167 days)
- Mean anomaly: 73.475°
- Mean motion: 0° 18^{m} 30.24^{s} / day
- Inclination: 1.7970°
- Longitude of ascending node: 129.37°
- Argument of perihelion: 81.057°
- Known satellites: 1 (period 40.02 h)

Physical characteristics
- Dimensions: 3.11 km (calculated); 3.139±0.045 km
- Synodic rotation period: 2.3247±0.0001 h
- Geometric albedo: 0.24 (assumed); 0.412±0.066
- Spectral type: S
- Absolute magnitude (H): 14.0 · 14.7 · 14.71±0.22

6615 Plutarchos, provisional designation 9512 P-L, is a Florian asteroid and suspected binary from the inner regions of the asteroid belt, approximately 3.1 kilometers in diameter. Discovered during the Palomar–Leiden survey in 1960, the asteroid was later named after the Greek philosopher Plutarch. Its minor-planet moon was discovered in 2007.

== Discovery ==
Plutarchos was discovered on 17 October 1960, by Dutch astronomer couple Ingrid and Cornelis van Houten at Leiden, on photographic plates exposed by Dutch–American astronomer Tom Gehrels at Palomar Observatory in California, United States.

=== Palomar–Leiden survey ===
The survey designation "P-L" stands for Palomar–Leiden, named after Palomar Observatory and Leiden Observatory, which collaborated on the fruitful Palomar–Leiden survey in the 1960s. Gehrels used Palomar's Samuel Oschin telescope (also known as the 48-inch Schmidt Telescope), and shipped the photographic plates to Ingrid and Cornelis van Houten at Leiden Observatory where astrometry was carried out. The trio are credited with the discovery of several thousand minor planets.

== Orbit and classification ==
The S-type asteroid is a member of the Flora family, one of the largest groups of stony asteroids in the main-belt. It orbit has an eccentricity of 0.13 and an inclination of 2° with respect to the ecliptic. As no precovery were taken, and no prior identifications were made, the body's observation arc begins with its official discovery observation at Palomar in 1960.

== Lightcurve and moon ==
A rotational lightcurve of Plutarchos was obtained from photometric observations taken by astronomers Julian Oey, Donald Pray and Petr Pravec in April 2007. Lightcurve analysis gave a well-defined rotation period of 2.3247 hours with a brightness variation of 0.06 in magnitude, indicating a nearly spheroidal shape (U=3). For an asteroid of its size, Plutarchos rotates rapidly, close to the 2.2-hour threshold spin rate for fast rotators.

=== Satellite ===
During the photometric observations in 2007, mutual eclipse/occultation events suggested that Plutarchos is a synchronous binary asteroid with a minor-planet moon orbiting it every 40.02 hours. However, neither a diameter estimate for the suspected satellite, nor any follow-up observations have been published since 2007.

== Diameter ==
According to the survey carried out by NASA's Wide-field Infrared Survey Explorer with its subsequent NEOWISE mission, Plutarchos measures 3.139 kilometers in diameter, and its surface has a very high albedo of 0.412, while the Collaborative Asteroid Lightcurve Link assumes an albedo of 0.24 – derived from 8 Flora, the family's largest member and namesake – and calculates a diameter of 3.11 kilometers, based on an absolute magnitude of 14.7.

== Naming ==
This minor planet was named for the Greek writer and Platonic philosopher Plutarch (c. AD 45–125), known for his Parallel Lives and Moralia a collection of biographies and essays, respectively. Plutarch studied mathematics and philosophy at the Academy of Athens. It is estimated that about half of his philosophical work has survived. The approved naming citation was published by the Minor Planet Center on 4 April 1996 (M.P.C. 26932).
