= C/1957 P1 (Mrkos) =

Non-periodic comet

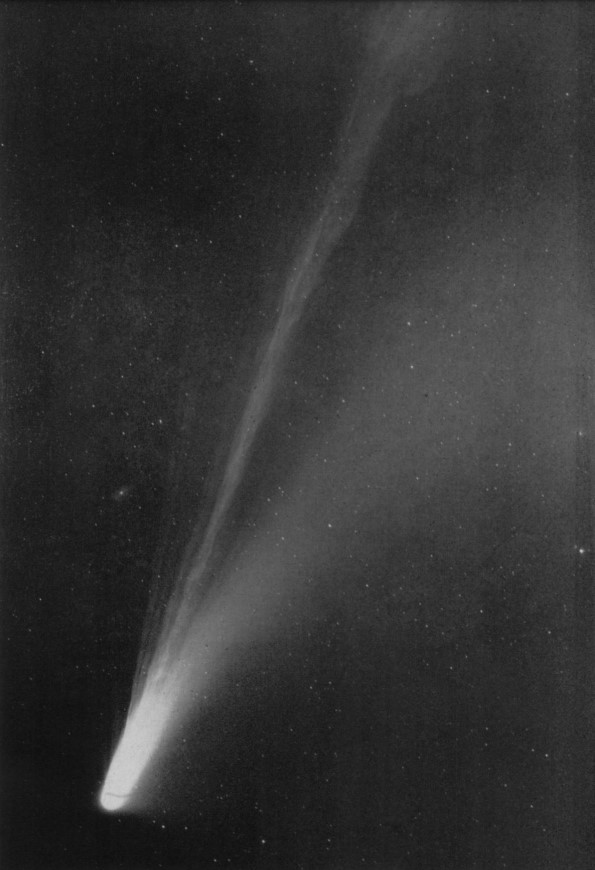
- Comet Mrkos photographed from the Palomar Observatory on 25 August 1957

Discovery
- Discovered by: Antonín Mrkos
- Discovery site: Lomnický štít, Czechoslovakia
- Discovery date: 29 July 1957

Designations
- Alternative designations: 1957 V, 1957e

Orbital characteristics
- Epoch: 10 March 1958 (JD 2436272.5)
- Observation arc: 312 days
- Number of observations: 16
- Aphelion: ~980 AU (inbound); ~640 AU (outbound)
- Perihelion: 0.355 AU
- Semi-major axis: ~540 AU
- Eccentricity: 0.99934
- Orbital period: ~10,900 years (inbound); ~5,750 years (outbound)
- Inclination: 93.957°
- Longitude of ascending node: 68.324°
- Argument of periapsis: 40.319°
- Mean anomaly: 0.018°
- Last perihelion: 1 August 1957
- T_{Jupiter}: –0.041
- Earth MOID: 0.521 AU
- Jupiter MOID: 0.979 AU

Physical characteristics
- Mean diameter: ~24.0 km (14.9 mi)
- Comet total magnitude (M1): 4.0
- Comet nuclear magnitude (M2): 12.2
- Apparent magnitude: 1.0 (1957 apparition)

Comet Mrkos, formally known as C/1957 P1 (old style 1957d), was a non-periodic comet discovered in 1957 by Antonín Mrkos. It was one of two bright comets that had their perihelion in 1957, the other being Comet Arend–Roland. Its peak magnitude was estimated to be around 1.0 and it has been characterised as a great comet.

== Observational history ==
The comet was discovered by Czech astronomer Antonin Mrkos by naked eye at the observatory on Lomnický štít, Czechoslovakia. He announced its discovery on August 2, 1957, but by that point it had already been discovered independently by others, with a report of observation from Japan dated July 29. However, the comet became known as comet Mrkos, as Mrkos' telegram was the first to arrive at the IAU. The comet was then near perihelion and its apparent magnitude was estimated to be around 2.0. By 4 August it had brightened to magnitude 1.0.

At the time of discovery the comet was near perihelion and located near Pollux in the constellation Gemini. It then moved north of the sun and was visible both in the evening and morning sky. The comet gradually moved away from the sun and became a conspicuous object visible after sunset. The tail of the comet was estimated to be more than 5 degrees long. The comet had two tails, one that at the start was brighter and curved, and a straight one with knots that became brighter at the end of August and showed rapid changes in appearance. From 10 August to 15 August the tail of the comet appeared striated. The comet moved from the southern part of Ursa Major to Coma Berenices, while fading slowly. In September it crossed into Virgo as a third-magnitude object; it remained visible to the naked eye until the end of September.

By the end of October 1957, the comet had moved close to the sun again and wasn't observable. It was recovered at the end of January 1958 and was last observed on 9 July 1958, when it was photographed as a diffuse 19th-magnitude object.

Observation of the comet revealed the presence of sodium and cyanide in its spectrum in the predicted values.
