= 6805 Abstracta =

Asteroid

Discovery
- Discovered by: C. J. van Houten; I. van Houten; T. Gehrels
- Discovery site: Palomar Obs.
- Discovery date: 24 September 1960

Designations
- Pronunciation: /æbˈstræktə/
- Named after: Astronomy and Astrophysics Abstracts
- Alternative designations: 4600 P-L · 1988 RG_{11}
- Minor planet category: main-belt · Themis

Orbital characteristics
- Epoch 4 September 2017 (JD 2458000.5)
- Uncertainty parameter 0
- Observation arc: 67.00 yr (24,472 days)
- Aphelion: 3.6852 AU
- Perihelion: 2.6917 AU
- Semi-major axis: 3.1885 AU
- Eccentricity: 0.1558
- Orbital period (sidereal): 5.69 yr (2,080 days)
- Mean anomaly: 281.84°
- Mean motion: 0° 10^{m} 23.16^{s} / day
- Inclination: 1.8950°
- Longitude of ascending node: 136.68°
- Argument of perihelion: 338.24°

Physical characteristics
- Dimensions: 8.41 km (calculated); 11.870±0.246 km
- Synodic rotation period: 152.1834±0.8953 h
- Geometric albedo: 0.08 (assumed); 0.087±0.026
- Spectral type: C
- Absolute magnitude (H): 13.0 · 12.9 · 13.74 · 13.286±0.009 (R)

6805 Abstracta, provisional designation 4600 P-L, is a carbonaceous Themistian asteroid and slow rotator from the outer region of the asteroid belt, approximately 10 kilometers in diameter.

It was discovered on 24 September 1960, by Dutch astronomer couple Ingrid and Cornelis van Houten at Leiden, on photographic plates taken by Dutch–American astronomer Tom Gehrels at Palomar Observatory in California, United States. The asteroid was named for the astronomical bibliography Astronomy and Astrophysics Abstracts.

== Orbit and classification ==
Abstracta is a member of the Themis family, a dynamical family of outer-belt asteroids with nearly coplanar ecliptical orbits. It orbits the Sun in the outer main-belt at a distance of 2.7–3.7 AU once every 5 years and 8 months (2,080 days). Its orbit has an eccentricity of 0.16 and an inclination of 2° with respect to the ecliptic. The first precovery was taken at Palomar Observatory in 1949, extending the asteroid's observation arc by 11 years prior to its discovery.

The survey designation "P–L" stands for "Palomar–Leiden", named after Palomar Observatory and Leiden Observatory, which collaborated on the fruitful Palomar–Leiden survey in the 1960s. Gehrels used Palomar's Samuel Oschin telescope (also known as the 48-inch Schmidt Telescope), and shipped the photographic plates to Ingrid and Cornelis van Houten at Leiden Observatory. The trio are credited with the discovery of several thousand minor planets.

== Physical characteristics ==
=== Lightcurve ===
A rotational lightcurve of Abstracta was obtained at the U.S. Palomar Transient Factory from photometric observation made in September 2011. It showed an exceptionally long rotation period of 152.1834±0.8953 hours with a brightness amplitude of 0.78 in magnitude (U=2).

=== Diameter and albedo ===
According to the NEOWISE mission of NASA's space-based Wide-field Infrared Survey Explorer, Abstracta measures 11.9 kilometers in diameter and its surface has a low albedo of 0.09. The Collaborative Asteroid Lightcurve Link assumes a typical albedo for carbonaceous asteroids of 0.08 and calculates a somewhat smaller diameter of 8.4 kilometers with an absolute magnitude of 13.74.

== Naming ==
This minor planet was named for the astronomical bibliography Astronomy and Astrophysics Abstracts (AAA).

Since it was founded under the auspices of the International Astronomical Union in 1969, it has systematically described, documented and indexed more than half a millions astronomical and astrophysical documents and produced more than 60 volumes. Head of AAA was German astronomer Lutz Schmadel, also known for his Dictionary of Minor Planet Names, and after whom the minor planet 2234 Schmadel is named. The official naming citation was published by the Minor Planet Center on 1 June 1996 (M.P.C. 27331).
