= Antonín Mrkos =

Czech astronomer

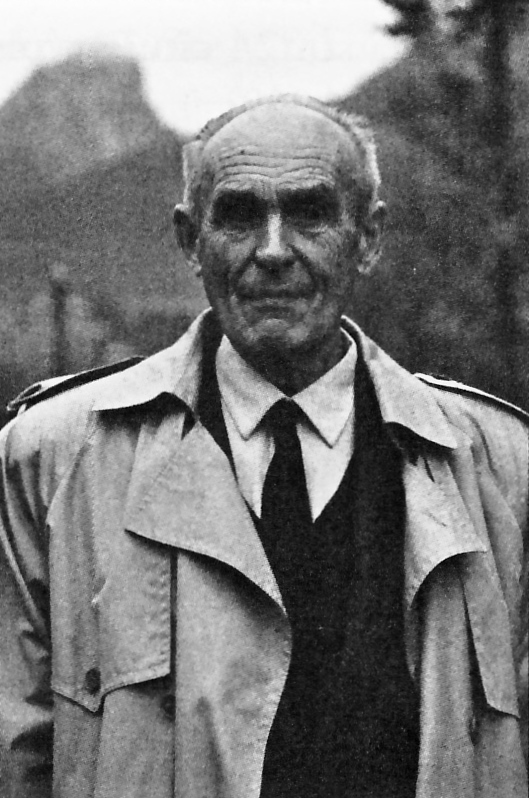
- Antonín Mrkos
- Born: 27 January 1918; Střemchoví
- Died: 29 May 1996 (aged 78); Prague
- Known for: Comet and Minor planet observer discoverer

Minor planets discovered: 274
see § List of discovered minor planets

Antonín Mrkos (Czech pronunciation: [ˈantoɲiːn ˈmr̩kos]) (27 January 1918 – 29 May 1996) was a Czech astronomer.

== Biography ==
Mrkos entered the University in Brno in 1938. His studies were interrupted by the onset of World War II, and in 1945 he became a staff member at the Skalnaté Pleso Observatory in Czechoslovakia (now in Slovakia). It was from here that he carried out his extremely active cometary programme and became the discoverer of several unusual comets, the most famous of them the bright Comet 1957d.

He was the second Czech in Antarctica and the first Czechoslovak to reach the Southern Pole of Inaccessibility as a member of the 3rd Soviet Antarctic Expedition (1957–1959). The Czechoslovak flag was the second flag raised after the flag of the USSR. He returned to Antarctica as the head of the four-member Czechoslovak crew in the seventh Soviet Antarctic Expedition (1961–1963). He was studying auroras among other things.

He was invited for what would have been his third expedition to the Antarctic but could not participate because of an almost fatal accident. It is thought someone tried to injure or to kill him by adding a bottle of strongly concentrated detergent among his other bottles of mineral water. Since this accident he could only eat liquid meals for the rest of his life.

In 1965 he became director of Kleť Observatory. Beginning in 1968 he made photographic observations at Kleť and extended this activity to minor planets in 1977. For many years he was the most regular contributor of data to the Minor Planet Center. He was President of Commission 6 from 1985 until 1988 (and vice president from 1982 until 1985). He was associate professor at the Charles University in Prague and the University of South Bohemia. Mrkos died in 1996 in Prague, aged 78.

He discovered or co-discovered thirteen comets. Among these were the periodic comets 18D/Perrine–Mrkos, 45P/Honda–Mrkos–Pajdušáková, 124P/Mrkos and 143P/Kowal–Mrkos. He also discovered the bright non-periodic comet C/1957 P1 (or, in the nomenclature of the time, comet 1957d). He discovered a number of asteroids (273 in total), including the Amor asteroid 5797 Bivoj and Trojan asteroid 3451 Mentor.

Mrkos named asteroids 6758 Jesseowens in honour of Jesse Owens and 2747 Český Krumlov after the historic town of the same name. Another main-belt asteroid, 3357 Tolstikov, was named in honour of Yevgeny Tolstikov with whom he had explored the Antarctic in his youth. Fellow astronomer Lyudmila Chernykh named 1832 Mrkos in his honour, while Mrkos gratified her and her husband Nikolai with 2325 Chernykh.

== List of discovered minor planets ==
2199 Kleť	6 June 1978	list
2304 Slavia	18 May 1979	list
2325 Chernykh	25 September 1979	list
2367 Praha	8 January 1981	list
2403 Šumava	25 September 1979	list
2404 Antarctica	1 October 1980	list
2552 Remek	24 September 1978	list
2559 Svoboda	23 October 1981	list
2747 Český Krumlov	19 February 1980	list
2811 Střemchoví	10 May 1980	list
2889 Brno	17 November 1981	list
2936 Nechvíle	17 September 1979	list
2971 Mohr	30 December 1980	list
3003 Konček	28 December 1983	list
3017 Petrovič	25 October 1981	list
3130 Hillary	20 December 1981	list
3137 Horky	16 September 1982	list
3141 Buchar	2 September 1984	list
3168 Lomnický Štít	1 December 1980	list
3257 Hanzlík	15 April 1982	list
3276 Porta Coeli	15 September 1982	list
3278 Běhounek	27 January 1984	list
3313 Mendel	19 February 1980	list
3324 Avsyuk	4 February 1983	list
3326 Agafonikov	20 March 1985	list

3334 Somov	20 December 1981	list
3339 Treshnikov	6 June 1978	list
3357 Tolstikov	21 March 1984	list
3364 Zdenka	5 April 1984	list
3395 Jitka	20 October 1985	list
3451 Mentor	19 April 1984	list
3490 Šolc	20 September 1984	list
3550 Link	20 December 1981	list
3571 Milanštefánik	15 March 1982	list
3629 Lebedinskij	21 November 1982	list
3630 Lubomír	28 August 1984	list
3636 Pajdušáková	17 October 1982	list
3645 Fabini	28 August 1981	list
3665 Fitzgerald	19 March 1979	list
3701 Purkyně	20 February 1985	list
3715 Štohl	19 February 1980	list
3716 Petzval	2 October 1980	list
3727 Maxhell	7 August 1981	list
3781 Dufek	2 September 1986	list
3791 Marci	17 November 1981	list
3827 Zdeněkhorský	3 November 1986	list
3847 Šindel	16 February 1982	list
3887 Gerstner	22 August 1985	list
3905 Doppler	28 August 1984	list
3949 Mach	20 October 1985	list

3979 Brorsen	8 November 1983	list
3980 Hviezdoslav	4 December 1983	list
3981 Stodola	26 January 1984	list
3983 Sakiko	20 September 1984	list
3993 Šorm	4 November 1988	list
4018 Bratislava	30 December 1980	list
4054 Turnov	5 October 1983	list
4090 Říšehvězd	2 September 1986	list
4176 Sudek	24 February 1987	list
4238 Audrey	13 April 1980	list
4249 Křemže	29 September 1984	list
4277 Holubov	15 January 1982	list
4287 Třísov	7 September 1989	list
4339 Almamater	20 October 1985	list
4405 Otava	21 August 1987	list
4408 Zlatá Koruna	4 October 1988	list
4552 Nabelek	11 May 1980	list
4554 Fanynka	28 October 1986	list
4610 Kájov	26 March 1989	list
4662 Runk	19 April 1984	list
4663 Falta	27 September 1984	list
4671 Drtikol	10 January 1988	list
4691 Toyen	7 October 1983	list
4698 Jizera	4 September 1986	list
4702 Berounka	23 April 1987	list

4801 Ohře	22 October 1989	list
4823 Libenice	4 October 1986	list
4824 Stradonice	25 November 1986	list
5026 Martes	22 August 1987	list
5089 Nádherná	25 September 1979	list
5102 Benfranklin	2 September 1986	list
5103 Diviš	4 September 1986	list
5122 Mucha	3 January 1989	list
5202 Charleseliot	5 December 1983	list
5250 Jas	21 August 1984	list
5318 Dientzenhofer	21 April 1985	list
5363 Kupka	19 October 1979	list
5418 Joyce	29 August 1981	list
5425 Vojtěch	20 September 1984	list
5552 Studnička	16 September 1982	list
5573 Hilarydownes	24 August 1981	list
5583 Braunerová	5 March 1989	list
5668 Foucault	22 March 1984	list
5712 Funke	25 September 1979	list
5719 Křižík	7 September 1983	list
5797 Bivoj	13 January 1980	list
5800 Pollock	16 October 1982	list
5801 Vasarely	26 January 1984	list
5803 Ötzi	21 July 1984	list
5804 Bambinidipraga	9 September 1985	list

5865 Qualytemocrina	31 August 1984	list
5891 Gehrig	22 September 1981	list
5894 Telč	14 September 1982	list
5897 Novotná	29 September 1984	list
5910 Zátopek	29 November 1989	list
5946 Hrozný	28 October 1984	list
5958 Barrande	29 January 1989	list
5997 Dirac	1 October 1983	list
5998 Sitenský	2 September 1986	list
6060 Doudleby	19 February 1980	list
6064 Holašovice	23 April 1987	list
6149 Pelčák	25 September 1979	list
6175 Cori	4 December 1983	list
6221 Ducentesima	13 April 1980	list
6223 Dahl	3 September 1980	list
6231 Hundertwasser	20 March 1985	list
6266 Letzel	4 October 1986	list
6281 Strnad	16 September 1980	list
6377 Cagney	25 June 1987	list
6379 Vrba	15 November 1987	list
6385 Martindavid	5 March 1989	list
6433 Enya	18 November 1978	list
6440 Ransome	8 September 1988	list
6441 Milenajesenská	9 September 1988	list
6469 Armstrong	14 August 1982	list

6470 Aldrin	14 September 1982	list
6471 Collins	4 March 1983	list
6481 Tenzing	9 September 1988	list
6508 Rolčík	22 August 1982	list
6516 Gruss	3 October 1988	list
6540 Stepling	16 September 1982	list
6542 Jacquescousteau	15 February 1985	list
6546 Kaye	24 February 1987	list
6550 Parléř	4 November 1988	list
6556 Arcimboldo	29 December 1989	list
6581 Sobers	22 September 1981	list
6583 Destinn	21 February 1984	list
6586 Seydler	28 October 1984	list
6594 Tasman	25 June 1987	list
6596 Bittner	15 November 1987	list
6597 Kreil	9 January 1988	list
6600 Qwerty	17 August 1988	list
6701 Warhol	14 January 1988	list
6712 Hornstein	23 February 1990	list
6758 Jesseowens	13 April 1980	list
6768 Mathiasbraun	7 September 1983	list
6769 Brokoff	15 February 1985	list
6774 Vladheinrich	4 November 1988	list
6779 Perrine	20 February 1990	list
6817 Pest	20 January 1982	list

6824 Mallory	8 September 1988	list
6825 Irvine	4 October 1988	list
6897 Tabei	15 November 1987	list
(7080) 1986 RS_{1}	5 September 1986	list
7107 Peiser	15 August 1980	list
7114 Weinek	29 November 1986	list
7115 Franciscuszeno	29 November 1986	list
7118 Kuklov	4 November 1988	list
7171 Arthurkraus	13 January 1988	list
7226 Kryl	21 August 1984	list
7232 Nabokov	20 October 1985	list
7328 Casanova	20 September 1984	list
7332 Ponrepo	4 December 1986	list
7334 Sciurus	17 August 1988	list
7391 Strouhal	8 November 1983	list
7398 Walsh	3 November 1986	list
7403 Choustník	14 January 1988	list
7464 Vipera	15 November 1987	list
7635 Carolinesmith	6 November 1983	list
7644 Cslewis	4 November 1988	list
7645 Pons	4 January 1989	list
7694 Krasetín	29 September 1983	list
7695 Přemysl	27 November 1984	list
7699 Božek	2 February 1989	list
7701 Zrzavý	14 October 1990	list

7742 Altamira	20 October 1985	list
7820 Ianlyon	14 October 1990	list
7859 Lhasa	19 October 1979	list
7864 Borucki	14 March 1982	list
7867 Burian	20 September 1984	list
7927 Jamiegilmour	29 November 1986	list
7993 Johnbridges	16 October 1982	list
8001 Ramsden	4 October 1986	list
8002 Tonyevans	4 December 1986	list
8022 Scottcrossfield	10 November 1990	list
8143 Nezval	11 November 1982	list
8152 Martinlee	3 November 1986	list
(8153) 1986 WO_{1}	25 November 1986	list
8249 Gershwin	13 April 1980	list
8258 McCracken	15 September 1982	list
8267 Kiss	4 October 1986	list
8333 Medina	7 November 1982	list
8336 Šafařík	27 September 1984	list
8343 Tugendhat	4 October 1986	list
8479 Held	29 April 1987	list
8639 Vonšovský	3 November 1986	list
(8650) 1989 TJ_{2}	5 October 1989	list
9007 James Bond	5 October 1983	list
9008 Bohšternberk	27 January 1984	list
9011 Angelou	20 September 1984	list

9027 Graps	4 November 1988	list
9028 Konrádbeneš	26 January 1989	list
(9031) 1989 WG_{4}	29 November 1989	list
(9292) 1982 UE_{2}	16 October 1982	list
(9538) 1982 UM_{2}	20 October 1982	list
9551 Kazi	20 October 1985	list
(9552) 1985 UY	24 October 1985	list
(9575) 1989 BW_{1}	29 January 1989	list
(9729) 1981 RQ	7 September 1981	list
9931 Herbhauptman	18 April 1985	list
10026 Sophiexeon	3 September 1980	list
10037 Raypickard	26 January 1984	list
(10291) 1985 UT	20 October 1985	list
(10294) 1988 AA_{2}	14 January 1988	list
(10705) 1981 SL	22 September 1981	list
11019 Hansrott	25 April 1984	list
11020 Orwell	31 July 1984	list
11026 Greatbotkin	2 September 1986	list
(11283) 1989 UX_{4}	25 October 1989	list
(11477) 1984 SY_{1}	29 September 1984	list
(11493) 1988 VN_{5}	4 November 1988	list
(11825) 1982 UW_{1}	16 October 1982	list
11830 Jessenius	2 May 1984	list
(11841) 1986 VW	3 November 1986	list
(12692) 1989 BV_{1}	29 January 1989	list

(12698) 1989 US_{4}	22 October 1989	list
(13491) 1984 UJ_{1}	28 October 1984	list
(13501) 1987 VR	15 November 1987	list
(13913) 1979 SO	25 September 1979	list
(14363) 1988 RB_{2}	8 September 1988	list
(14379) 1989 UM_{4}	22 October 1989	list
(15222) 1982 FL_{1}	24 March 1982	list
(15233) 1987 WU_{4}	26 November 1987	list
(16448) 1989 RV_{2}	7 September 1989	list
(17404) 1986 TZ_{3}	4 October 1986	list
17407 Teige	14 October 1987	list
(18300) 1979 PA	14 August 1979	list
(18325) 1984 SB_{2}	29 September 1984	list
(18328) 1985 UU	20 October 1985	list
(19124) 1986 TH_{3}	4 October 1986	list
19129 Loos	10 January 1988	list
(19184) 1991 TB_{6}	6 October 1991	list
20964 Mons Naklethi	16 October 1977	list
20969 Samo	17 September 1979	list
22260 Ur	19 October 1979	list
(22274) 1981 RN	7 September 1981	list
(22284) 1986 SH	30 September 1986	list
(22288) 1988 TR_{2}	11 October 1988	list
(22307) 1990 SU_{4}	16 September 1990	list
23437 Šíma	27 September 1984	list

(24619) 1979 DA	26 February 1979	list
(24661) 1988 GQ	12 April 1988	list
24662 Gryll	14 April 1988	list
24695 Štyrský	16 September 1990	list
(26807) 1982 RK_{1}	14 September 1982	list
(27702) 1984 SE_{1}	27 September 1984	list
(27703) 1984 SA_{2}	29 September 1984	list
(30770) 1984 SL_{4}	27 September 1984	list
(30772) 1986 RJ_{1}	2 September 1986	list
(32774) 1986 VZ	3 November 1986	list
(35086) 1990 TW_{8}	14 October 1990	list
(37559) 1985 UR	20 October 1985	list
(39514) 1986 TV_{3}	4 October 1986	list
(39515) 1986 XD_{5}	4 December 1986	list
(46546) 1988 VM_{5}	4 November 1988	list
(52268) 1986 WU	25 November 1986	list
(58140) 1981 SN	22 September 1981	list
(65668) 1988 AX_{1}	14 January 1988	list
(65686) 1990 TN_{8}	14 October 1990	list
(85155) 1986 VH_{7}	7 November 1986	list
(85164) 1988 TG_{2}	3 October 1988	list
(85167) 1989 RS_{2}	7 September 1989	list
(100012) 1989 BC_{1}	25 January 1989	list
217628 Lugh	17 April 1990	list

== List of discovered comets ==
Comets discovered: 13
C/1947 Y1 (Mrkos)	20 December 1947	MPC · JPL
C/1948 E1 (Pajdušáková–Mrkos)	13 March 1948	MPC · JPL
45P/Honda–Mrkos–Pajdušáková	7 December 1948	MPC · JPL
C/1952 H1 (Mrkos)	27 April 1952	MPC · JPL
C/1952 W1 (Mrkos)	28 November 1952	MPC · JPL
C/1953 G1 (Mrkos–Honda)	12 April 1953	MPC · JPL
C/1955 L1 (Mrkos)	12 June 1955	MPC · JPL
18D/Perrine–Mrkos	19 October 1955	MPC · JPL
C/1956 E1 (Mrkos)	12 March 1956	MPC · JPL
C/1957 P1 (Mrkos)	29 July 1957	MPC · JPL
C/1959 X1 (Mrkos)	3 December 1959	MPC · JPL
143P/Kowal–Mrkos	2 May 1984	MPC · JPL
124P/Mrkos	16 March 1991	MPC · JPL

== See also ==
- List of minor planet discoverers § A. Mrkos
