= 18D/Perrine–Mrkos =

Lost comet

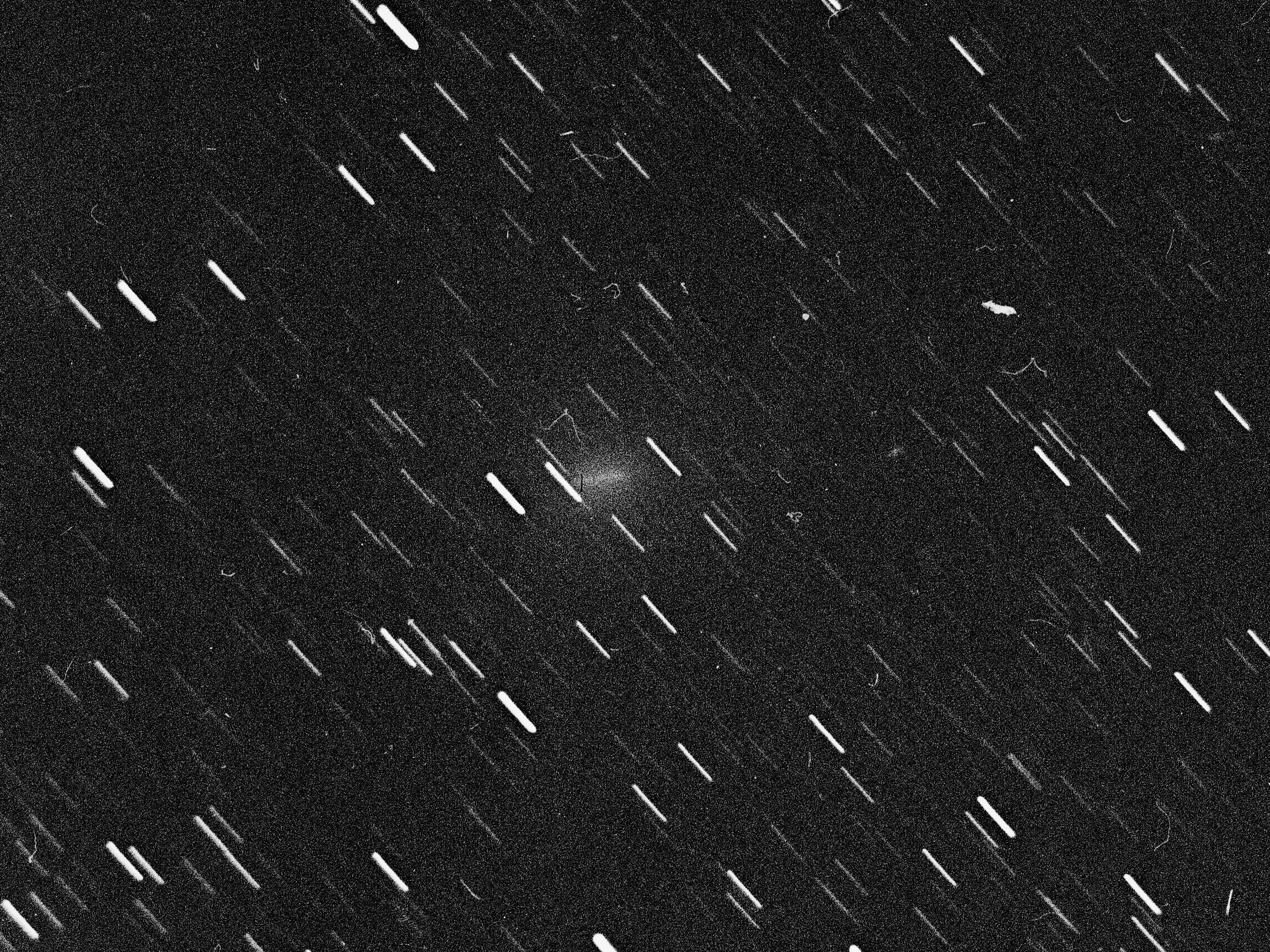
- The comet on 11 October 1909 by the Heidelberg-Königstuhl State Observatory

Discovery
- Discovered by: Charles Dillon Perrine; Antonín Mrkos
- Discovery date: 9 December 1896

Designations
- MPC designation: D/1896 X1, D/1909 P1, D/1955 U1
- Alternative designations: 1896 VII, 1909 III; 1955 VII, 1962 I; 1968 VIII; 1896g, 1909b, 1955i, 1961h, 1968h

Orbital characteristics
- Epoch: 1968-10-31 (JD 2440160.5)
- Observation arc: 7 years (Not observed in 57 years)
- Aphelion: 5.85 AU
- Perihelion: 1.272 AU
- Semi-major axis: 3.56 AU
- Eccentricity: 0.6426
- Orbital period: 6.72 yr
- Inclination: 17.7759°
- Last perihelion: 2025-Jan-01? (unobserved)
- Next perihelion: 2026-Jun-18? (Kinoshita); 2032-Sep-21? (Horizons)

18D/Perrine–Mrkos is a periodic comet in the Solar System, originally discovered by the American-Argentine astronomer Charles Dillon Perrine (Lick Observatory, California, United States) on December 9, 1896. For some time it was thought to be a fragment of Biela's Comet.

It was considered lost after the 1909 appearance, but was rediscovered by the Czech astronomer Antonín Mrkos (Skalnate Pleso Observatory, Slovakia) on October 19, 1955, using ordinary binoculars. It was later confirmed as 18D by Leland E. Cunningham (Leuschner Observatory, University of California, Berkeley).

The comet was last observed during the 1968 perihelion passage when it passed 0.3144 AU (47,030,000 km; 29,230,000 mi) from the Earth. The comet has not been observed during the following perihelion passages:

- 1975 Aug 2
- 1982 May 16 / 1982 May 14
- 1989 Feb 28 / 1998 Feb 24
- 1995 Dec 6 (apmag 19?) / 1995 Nov 29
- 2002 Sept 10 (apmag 20?) / 2002 Aug 31
- 2009 Apr 17 (apmag 24?) / 2009 Mar 10
- 2017 Feb 26 (apmag 24?) / 2017 Oct 29
- 2025 Jan 1 (apmag 23?) / 2026 June 18(?) with the difference in perihelion estimates being 533 days

The next predicted perihelion passage could be in 2026 or 2032, but the comet is currently considered lost as it has not been seen since Jan 1969 (57 years ago).

Numbered comets
Previous; 17P/Holmes	18D/Perrine–Mrkos	Next; 19P/Borrelly
