= Kleť Observatory =

Astronomical observatory in Czechia

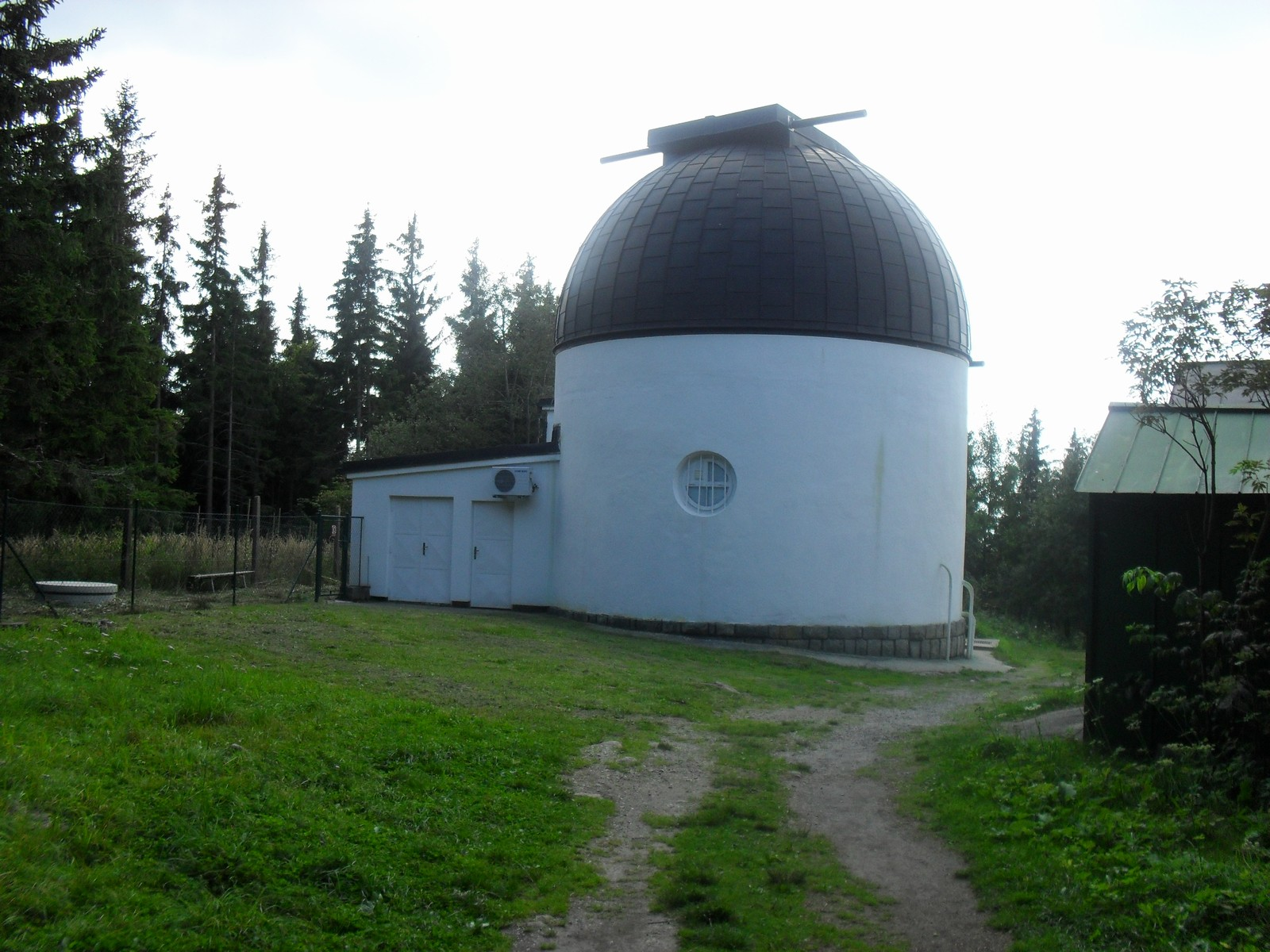
- Alternative names: Klet Observatory-KLENOT
- Named after: Kleť
- Observatory code: 046, 246
- Location: Kleť, Kájov,, Český Krumlov District, South Bohemian Region, Czechia
- Coordinates: 48°51′50″N 14°17′05″E
- Altitude: 1,070 m (3,510 ft)
- Website: klet.cz
- Related media on Commons

Kleť Observatory (Czech: Hvězdárna Kleť; obs. code: 046) is an astronomical observatory in the Czech Republic. It is situated in South Bohemia, south of the summit of Mount Kleť, near the town of České Budějovice. Constructed in 1957, the observatory is at an altitude of 1,070 metres (3,510 ft) and has around 150 clear nights per year.

== Astronomers ==
Astronomer Antonín Mrkos became director of Kleť Observatory in 1965.

Two main astronomers who currently work at Kleť Observatory are Jana Tichá and her husband Miloš Tichý.

== Instruments ==
The observatory has two primary telescopes:

- 1.06-m KLENOT telescope (since 2002)
- 0.57-m f/5.2 reflector (since 1993)

== Gallery ==
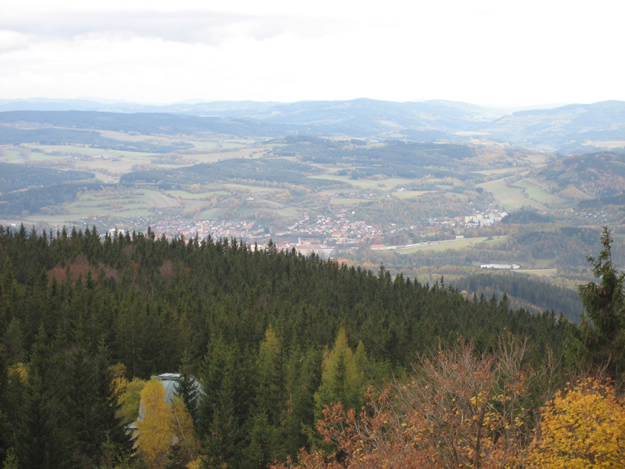
Summit of Mount Kleť, the observatory is visible on the left

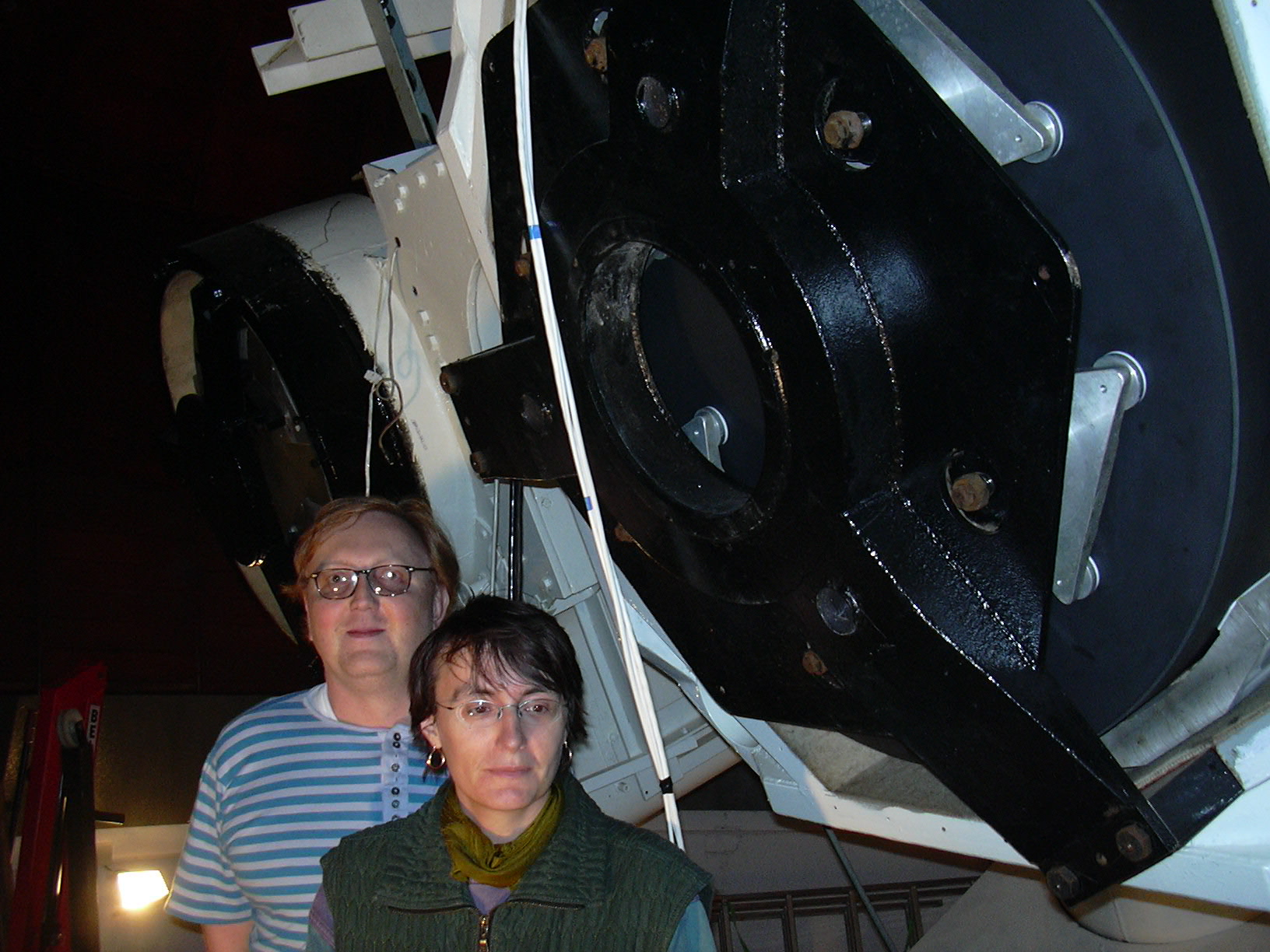
Jana Tichá, Miloš Tichý and KLENOT in 2004

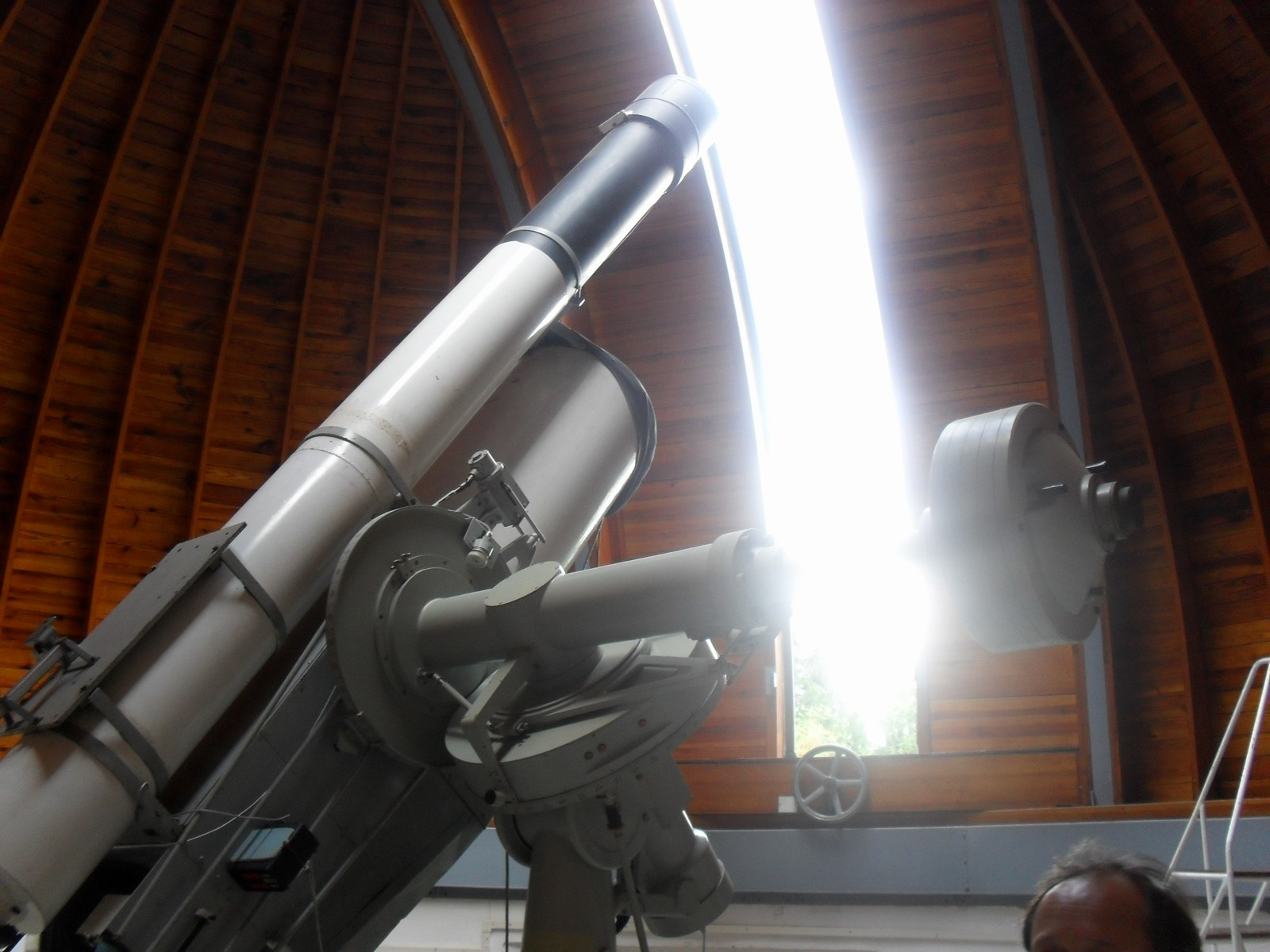
Telescope

== Discoveries ==
Minor planets discovered: 315
see § Discoveries credited to Kleť Observatory

As of 2015 over a thousand asteroids were discovered at Kleť Observatory, as well as comet 196P/Tichý.

Asteroid 5583 Braunerova was discovered by A. Mrkos at Kleť Observatory in 1989. The asteroid 7796 Járacimrman was (re)discovered at Kleť Observatory on 16 January 1996 by Zdeněk Moravec and was designated 1996 BG. It was observed until April 1996 and then in June and July 1997. It was discovered to be a lost asteroid which had previously been observed twice: at the Brera-Merate Observatory in northern Italy on 12 December 1973 and at Siding Spring Observatory (Australia), on 8 and 9 July 1990. Asteroid 4250 Perun, provisional designation "1984 UG", was discovered by Zdeňka Vávrová on 20 October 1984.

=== Discoveries credited to Kleť Observatory ===
7390 Kundera	31 August 1983	list
7672 Hawking	24 October 1995	list
7799 Martinšolc	24 February 1996	list
8137 Kvíz	19 September 1979	list
8719 Vesmír	11 November 1995	list
8990 Compassion	19 February 1980	list
9087 Neff	29 September 1995	list
(9444) 1997 JA	1 May 1997	list
9665 Inastronoviny	5 June 1996	list
(9901) 1997 NV	1 July 1997	list
(12010) 1996 UN	18 October 1996	list
12409 Bukovanská	28 September 1995	list
12790 Cernan	24 October 1995	list
12799 von Suttner	26 November 1995	list
12835 Stropek	7 February 1997	list
14056 Kainar	13 January 1996	list
(14541) 1997 SF	20 September 1997	list
(15051) 1998 YK_{1}	17 December 1998	list
(15456) 1998 YP_{3}	18 December 1998	list
(17167) 1999 NB	4 July 1999	list
(17595) 1995 EO	1 March 1995	list
17611 Jožkakubík	24 October 1995	list
(18535) 1996 XQ_{13}	9 December 1996	list
(18613) 1998 DR	19 February 1998	list
(18846) 1999 RB_{28}	8 September 1999	list

(19273) 1995 XJ	10 December 1995	list
(19613) 1999 OX	19 July 1999	list
(20201) 1997 EK_{6}	6 March 1997	list
(20622) 1999 TQ_{11}	8 October 1999	list
21257 Jižní Čechy	26 February 1996	list
(21317) 1996 XV_{18}	12 December 1996	list
24847 Polesný	26 November 1995	list
(25007) 1998 PJ	5 August 1998	list
(25013) 1998 QR	17 August 1998	list
25383 Lindacker	18 October 1999	list
(26962) 1997 PE_{3}	13 August 1997	list
(27173) 1999 BM_{1}	18 January 1999	list
(27907) 1996 TU_{9}	15 October 1996	list
(27961) 1997 SU_{1}	22 September 1997	list
(28030) 1998 DW_{12}	26 February 1998	list
(28217) 1998 YO_{3}	18 December 1998	list
28614 Vejvoda	25 March 2000	list
29760 Milevsko	15 February 1999	list
(31049) 1996 QZ	20 August 1996	list
(31092) 1997 CW_{5}	6 February 1997	list
(31106) 1997 PU_{2}	12 August 1997	list
(31145) 1997 UK	19 October 1997	list
(31204) 1998 AA_{10}	15 January 1998	list
(31215) 1998 BN_{10}	26 January 1998	list
(31321) 1998 HD_{3}	21 April 1998	list

(31364) 1998 WM_{6}	24 November 1998	list
(31571) 1999 FY_{20}	25 March 1999	list
(32596) 2001 QS_{154}	29 August 2001	list
(32939) 1995 UN_{2}	24 October 1995	list
(32970) 1996 QX	19 August 1996	list
(33006) 1997 EJ_{6}	6 March 1997	list
(33052) 1997 UA_{8}	29 October 1997	list
(33136) 1998 DZ	18 February 1998	list
(33240) 1998 HC_{3}	20 April 1998	list
(34160) 2000 QS_{26}	26 August 2000	list
(35683) 1999 BK_{5}	21 January 1999	list
(35761) 1999 HC_{2}	21 April 1999	list
(37694) 1995 WC_{6}	26 November 1995	list
(37753) 1997 CO_{13}	7 February 1997	list
(39893) 1998 FS_{5}	24 March 1998	list
(40202) 1998 SN_{26}	24 September 1998	list
(42598) 1997 UD_{8}	29 October 1997	list
(42605) 1998 BR_{25}	27 January 1998	list
(42619) 1998 FE_{12}	25 March 1998	list
(42997) 1999 UM_{1}	18 October 1999	list
(44104) 1998 GO_{1}	7 April 1998	list
(44885) 1999 VB	1 November 1999	list
(45016) 1999 WV_{2}	30 November 1999	list
(45471) 2000 AG_{204}	13 January 2000	list
(46252) 2001 HH_{32}	30 April 2001	list

(46663) 1996 DR_{2}	26 February 1996	list
(46672) 1996 OA	16 July 1996	list
(46730) 1997 TY_{16}	9 October 1997	list
(46776) 1998 HN_{49}	24 April 1998	list
(46924) 1998 SP_{26}	24 September 1998	list
(47163) 1999 TP_{11}	8 October 1999	list
(47500) 2000 AX_{50}	7 January 2000	list
(48727) 1997 AL_{18}	15 January 1997	list
(48732) 1997 CM_{4}	3 February 1997	list
(50184) 2000 AN_{168}	13 January 2000	list
(50960) 2000 GN_{82}	9 April 2000	list
(51199) 2000 JA_{4}	4 May 2000	list
(52524) 1996 PH	8 August 1996	list
(53134) 1999 BG_{1}	18 January 1999	list
(54222) 2000 JF	3 May 2000	list
(55904) 1998 DR_{1}	20 February 1998	list
(55905) 1998 DD_{3}	21 February 1998	list
(55941) 1998 HS_{4}	23 April 1998	list
(56423) 2000 GW_{3}	2 April 2000	list
(58516) 1996 XT_{14}	11 December 1996	list
(58574) 1997 RD_{8}	11 September 1997	list
(58582) 1997 SF_{3}	25 September 1997	list
(58690) 1998 BP_{10}	27 January 1998	list
(58694) 1998 BQ_{25}	27 January 1998	list
(58752) 1998 FF_{12}	26 March 1998	list

(59113) 1998 XQ	10 December 1998	list
(59197) 1999 BN_{3}	20 January 1999	list
(59797) 1999 PX	7 August 1999	list
(63688) 2001 QR_{154}	28 August 2001	list
(65793) 1995 WS_{3}	21 November 1995	list
(66857) 1999 VQ_{25}	15 November 1999	list
(67069) 2000 AQ_{1}	2 January 2000	list
(69450) 1996 TL_{3}	4 October 1996	list
(69475) 1996 XE_{9}	6 December 1996	list
(69579) 1998 DQ_{1}	20 February 1998	list
(69999) 1998 XN	9 December 1998	list
(70937) 1999 WT_{2}	29 November 1999	list
(73810) 1995 UW_{2}	24 October 1995	list
(73871) 1997 AP_{16}	14 January 1997	list
(73935) 1997 SH_{3}	26 September 1997	list
(74312) 1998 UO_{6}	21 October 1998	list
(74381) 1998 XU_{15}	15 December 1998	list
(74401) 1998 YZ	16 December 1998	list
(74596) 1999 QQ	20 August 1999	list
(74805) 1999 TF	2 October 1999	list
(75759) 2000 AH_{168}	12 January 2000	list
(77039) 2001 CK_{37}	15 February 2001	list
(79243) 1994 RA_{1}	9 September 1994	list
(79347) 1996 XJ_{2}	4 December 1996	list
(79478) 1998 CB_{1}	6 February 1998	list

(79498) 1998 FP_{126}	31 March 1998	list
79896 Billhaley	20 January 1999	list
(80243) 1999 WL_{1}	28 November 1999	list
(80629) 2000 AJ_{204}	14 January 2000	list
(80630) 2000 AL_{204}	14 January 2000	list
(85402) 1996 TO_{15}	4 October 1996	list
(85416) 1996 XN_{2}	4 December 1996	list
(85428) 1997 AN_{16}	14 January 1997	list
(85429) 1997 AJ_{18}	15 January 1997	list
(85508) 1997 UD_{7}	23 October 1997	list
(85510) 1997 UZ_{7}	29 October 1997	list
(85576) 1998 DH_{1}	19 February 1998	list
(85772) 1998 UN_{6}	21 October 1998	list
(85816) 1998 XG	8 December 1998	list
(85840) 1998 YR_{4}	18 December 1998	list
(85864) 1999 BJ_{7}	21 January 1999	list
(88909) 2001 TG_{7}	13 October 2001	list
(90821) 1995 SA_{2}	26 September 1995	list
(90828) 1995 UH_{2}	23 October 1995	list
(90893) 1997 BE	16 January 1997	list
(90907) 1997 GX	3 April 1997	list
(90933) 1997 TX_{7}	5 October 1997	list
(91012) 1998 DY	18 February 1998	list
(91042) 1998 FF_{15}	26 March 1998	list
(91225) 1999 BL_{3}	20 January 1999	list

(91226) 1999 BK_{7}	22 January 1999	list
(91330) 1999 HM_{2}	20 April 1999	list
(94186) 2001 AH_{45}	15 January 2001	list
(95072) 2002 AW_{66}	15 January 2002	list
(96355) 1997 VR_{6}	11 November 1997	list
(96393) 1998 DF_{1}	19 February 1998	list
(98074) 2000 RT_{56}	7 September 2000	list
(98725) 2000 YP_{14}	23 December 2000	list
(98727) 2000 YN_{16}	26 December 2000	list
(100358) 1995 UK_{2}	24 October 1995	list
(100437) 1996 OY	22 July 1996	list
(100462) 1996 TV_{9}	15 October 1996	list
(100508) 1997 AY_{14}	13 January 1997	list
(100517) 1997 BD	16 January 1997	list
(100524) 1997 CV_{5}	6 February 1997	list
(100625) 1997 UZ	22 October 1997	list
(101041) 1998 QV_{98}	31 August 1998	list
(101578) 1999 BM_{3}	20 January 1999	list
(101621) 1999 CH_{16}	15 February 1999	list
(101893) 1999 PJ	6 August 1999	list
(101963) 1999 RG_{40}	15 September 1999	list
(102622) 1999 VR_{25}	15 November 1999	list
(102859) 1999 WH_{1}	28 November 1999	list
(102860) 1999 WJ_{1}	28 November 1999	list
(102867) 1999 WE_{5}	30 November 1999	list

(104329) 2000 FN_{8}	25 March 2000	list
(107567) 2001 DK_{89}	27 February 2001	list
(112063) 2002 JA_{16}	7 May 2002	list
(120676) 1997 AO_{16}	14 January 1997	list
(120788) 1998 FD_{16}	26 March 1998	list
(120801) 1998 FU_{72}	30 March 1998	list
(120816) 1998 HN_{42}	30 April 1998	list
(120985) 1998 XT_{15}	15 December 1998	list
(121088) 1999 FX_{20}	24 March 1999	list
(121225) 1999 RX_{27}	8 September 1999	list
(121239) 1999 RQ_{41}	14 September 1999	list
(121643) 1999 WN_{1}	28 November 1999	list
(121804) 2000 AK_{168}	13 January 2000	list
(128721) 2004 RU_{136}	8 September 2004	list
(129590) 1997 UN	19 October 1997	list
(129597) 1997 VT_{1}	4 November 1997	list
(129878) 1999 SQ_{2}	21 September 1999	list
(132160) 2002 ES_{2}	8 March 2002	list
(134486) 1998 XP	10 December 1998	list
(134738) 2000 AM_{168}	13 January 2000	list
(134742) 2000 AK_{204}	14 January 2000	list
(136825) 1997 SX_{3}	26 September 1997	list
(136833) 1997 UP	19 October 1997	list
(137033) 1998 UM_{6}	21 October 1998	list
(142473) 2002 TF_{15}	1 October 2002	list

(143492) 2003 DP_{4}	22 February 2003	list
(151241) 2002 AE	4 January 2002	list
(151436) 2002 GK_{2}	6 April 2002	list
(152661) 1998 DS_{1}	20 February 1998	list
(152733) 1998 WL_{8}	25 November 1998	list
(152743) 1998 YK_{6}	22 December 1998	list
(152745) 1998 YN_{11}	24 December 1998	list
(154468) 2003 DG_{17}	28 February 2003	list
(155400) 1995 UD_{1}	21 October 1995	list
155438 Velásquez	18 February 1998	list
(155679) 2000 JP_{2}	4 May 2000	list
(156867) 2003 DD_{16}	27 February 2003	list
(157852) 1998 TH_{6}	13 October 1998	list
(160539) 1997 SG	20 September 1997	list
(160605) 1999 TT_{12}	12 October 1999	list
(161230) 2002 XO_{90}	13 December 2002	list
(162059) 1997 AM_{17}	13 January 1997	list
(164677) 1997 GA_{4}	8 April 1997	list
(164717) 1998 GN_{1}	6 April 1998	list
(164818) 1999 RR_{41}	14 September 1999	list
(166386) 2002 NO_{4}	8 July 2002	list
(173165) 1997 AM_{18}	15 January 1997	list
(173208) 1998 SO_{26}	24 September 1998	list
(175697) 1995 UG_{2}	23 October 1995	list
(175707) 1996 QA_{1}	20 August 1996	list

(178337) 1995 UM_{2}	24 October 1995	list
(179560) 2002 EL_{11}	13 March 2002	list
(180523) 2004 DR_{38}	20 February 2004	list
(181766) 1997 AW_{14}	12 January 1997	list
(188152) 2002 GK	2 April 2002	list
(188209) 2002 SO_{28}	30 September 2002	list
(189424) 1997 SK_{2}	25 September 1997	list
(191899) 2005 BP_{1}	17 January 2005	list
(192458) 1998 DG_{1}	19 February 1998	list
(192466) 1998 FJ_{16}	30 March 1998	list
(192588) 1999 BH_{1}	18 January 1999	list
(192928) 2000 AP_{6}	5 January 2000	list
(194004) 2001 SB_{5}	18 September 2001	list
(196948) 2003 US_{38}	26 October 2003	list
(197952) 2004 RA_{84}	9 September 2004	list
(200204) 1999 TX_{4}	2 October 1999	list
(200529) 2001 DA	16 February 2001	list
(204576) 2005 GN_{9}	3 April 2005	list
(205013) 1997 PS_{2}	11 August 1997	list
(205063) 1999 RD_{39}	13 September 1999	list
(205166) 2000 AL_{168}	13 January 2000	list
(205257) 2000 RT_{78}	9 September 2000	list
(208033) 1999 QR	20 August 1999	list
(209066) 2003 QU_{69}	26 August 2003	list
(210476) 1995 UF_{1}	22 October 1995	list

(213647) 2002 RY_{116}	7 September 2002	list
(213775) 2003 DK_{17}	28 February 2003	list
(215123) 1999 RS_{41}	15 September 1999	list
(215624) 2003 SF_{235}	26 September 2003	list
(219102) 1998 SQ_{26}	24 September 1998	list
(220629) 2004 PE_{105}	15 August 2004	list
(225571) 2000 UV_{1}	23 October 2000	list
(230853) 2004 RZ_{83}	9 September 2004	list
(231745) 1999 RR_{214}	15 September 1999	list
(231924) 2001 CL_{37}	15 February 2001	list
(232962) 2005 ES_{38}	4 March 2005	list
(239808) 1996 TK_{9}	12 October 1996	list
(239817) 1998 BZ_{33}	31 January 1998	list
(241373) 2008 RM	2 September 2008	list
(242235) 2003 SM_{129}	20 September 2003	list
(243160) 2007 TB_{75}	15 October 2007	list
(245366) 2005 GS	1 April 2005	list
(247201) 2001 OO_{109}	31 July 2001	list
(251721) 1997 UO	19 October 1997	list
(251726) 1998 DD_{1}	18 February 1998	list
(264990) 2003 DR_{4}	22 February 2003	list
(267018) 1995 UL_{2}	24 October 1995	list
(268052) 2004 RH	2 September 2004	list
(268053) 2004 RV_{1}	5 September 2004	list
(268057) 2004 RQ_{24}	8 September 2004	list

(269246) 2008 QF_{20}	30 August 2008	list
(274296) 2008 QJ_{19}	27 August 2008	list
(276496) 2003 QU_{27}	23 August 2003	list
(279966) 2001 TD_{8}	15 October 2001	list
(280175) 2002 RB_{117}	7 September 2002	list
(280371) 2003 UV_{7}	18 October 2003	list
(281167) 2007 EN_{39}	12 March 2007	list
(285142) 1995 UG_{1}	22 October 1995	list
(287641) 2003 JA_{4}	3 May 2003	list
(287692) 2003 QX_{27}	23 August 2003	list
(302054) 2000 UU_{1}	22 October 2000	list
(303177) 2004 FW_{31}	29 March 2004	list
(307626) 2003 SS_{76}	18 September 2003	list
(307688) 2003 UW_{7}	18 October 2003	list
(309359) 2007 TG_{72}	14 October 2007	list
(310951) 2003 UT_{38}	26 October 2003	list
(311119) 2004 PA_{20}	8 August 2004	list
(318168) 2004 RY	5 September 2004	list
(322455) 2011 UG_{36}	14 February 2001	list
(323297) 2003 UX_{7}	18 October 2003	list
(326173) 2012 BC_{115}	14 February 2001	list
(328372) 2008 QH_{19}	27 August 2008	list
(330483) 2007 GY_{24}	11 April 2007	list
(331906) 2004 RR_{10}	7 September 2004	list
(344647) 2003 QT_{69}	26 August 2003	list

(363728) 2004 XC_{4}	4 December 2004	list
(363761) 2005 CF_{37}	6 February 2005	list
(366351) 1999 TO_{11}	8 October 1999	list
(368582) 2004 PD_{105}	15 August 2004	list
(370011) 2000 AD_{42}	6 January 2000	list
(377174) 2003 UR_{38}	24 October 2003	list
(386031) 2007 EY_{26}	12 March 2007	list
(401820) 1996 SP_{7}	30 September 1996	list
(410327) 2007 UT_{12}	16 October 2007	list
(427516) 2002 GZ_{1}	4 April 2002	list
(430629) 2003 QW_{27}	23 August 2003	list
(434343) 2004 RG	2 September 2004	list
(457074) 2008 EE_{69}	6 March 2008	list
(462055) 2007 EX_{26}	12 March 2007	list
(474144) 1997 UA	18 October 1997	list

== KLENOT project ==
Minor planets discovered: 30
see § List of discovered minor planets

KLENOT is an initialism of KLET Observatory Near Earth and Other unusual objects observations Team and Telescope. It is limited to objects with a visual apparent magnitude of 22.0 and brighter.

=== List of discovered minor planets ===
42377 KLENOT	8 March 2002	list
68779 Schöninger	18 March 2002	list
89909 Linie	8 March 2002	list
90279 Devětsil	26 February 2003	list
111913 Davidgans	1 April 2002	list
126780 Ivovasiljev	10 March 2002	list
128622 Rudiš	4 September 2004	list
149160 Geojih	1 April 2002	list
149728 Klostermann	19 May 2004	list
157064 Sedona	26 September 2003	list
159743 Kluk	23 March 2003	list
159799 Kralice	15 September 2003	list

159814 Saguaro	27 September 2003	list
166570 Adolfträger	8 September 2002	list
170306 Augustzátka	18 September 2003	list
175017 Záboří	28 March 2004	list
183560 Křišťan	24 May 2003	list
191282 Feustel	22 March 2003	list
204370 Ferdinandvaněk	5 October 2004	list
209107 Šafránek	16 September 2003	list
213771 Johndee	27 February 2003	list
215841 Čimelice	6 February 2005	list
223360 Švankmajer	16 September 2003	list
230648 Zikmund	17 September 2003	list

232923 Adalovelace	15 January 2005	list
235621 Kratochvíle	5 September 2004	list
250374 Jírovec	17 October 2003	list
350969 Boiohaemum	27 February 2003	list
363623 Chelčický	15 August 2004	list
405207 Konstanz	24 May 2003	list

== See also ==
- List of astronomical observatories
