= List of named minor planets: K =

This is a partial list of named minor planets, containing all those starting with the letter K, as of 9 November 2026. It is ordered in a case-insensitive, alphabetical manner and contains a total of 1,630 entries. Grey minor planets have no article and redirect to the list of minor planets instead (see List of minor planets § Main index).

== K ==
- 469705 ǂKá̦gára
- 514107 Kaʻepaokaʻāwela
- 16711 Ka-Dar
- 4227 Kaali
- 23748 Kaarethode
- 2257 Kaarina
- 16007 Kaasalainen
- 4998 Kabashima
- 7670 Kabeláč
- 22079 Kabinoff
- 16190 Kabirjolly
- 20351 Kaborchardt
- 180824 Kabos
- 17905 Kabtamu
- 12758 Kabudari
- 6270 Kabukuri
- 6464 Kaburaki
- 284919 Kaçar
- 7492 Kačenka
- 2760 Kacha
- 7461 Kachmokiam
- 2015 Kachuevskaya
- 1874 Kacivelia
- 594782 Kacperwierzchoś
- 145488 Kaczendre
- 23717 Kaddoura
- 399673 Kadenyuk
- 25697 Kadiyala
- 8709 Kadlu
- 9751 Kadota
- 17103 Kadyrsizova
- 28322 Kaeberich
- 5195 Kaendler
- 524638 Kaffkamargit
- 3412 Kafka
- 4256 Kagamigawa
- 36783 Kagamino
- 16131 Kaganovich
- 6665 Kagawa
- 11949 Kagayayutaka
- 11623 Kagekatu
- 12372 Kagesuke
- 12370 Kageyasu
- 7562 Kagiroino-Oka
- 4703 Kagoshima
- 6187 Kagura
- 10880 Kaguya
- 7991 Kaguyahime
- 4563 Kahnia
- 4284 Kaho
- 1587 Kahrstedt
- 12079 Kaibab
- 34401 Kaibeecher
- 500000 Kaichi
- 4467 Kaidanovskij
- 33196 Kaienyang
- 35366 Kaifeng
- 6412 Kaifu
- 127517 Kaikepan
- 29641 Kaikloepfer
- 33617 Kailashraman
- 28726 Kailey-Steiner
- 14056 Kainar
- 5433 Kairen
- 1694 Kaiser
- 3880 Kaiserman
- 10947 Kaiserstuhl
- 324417 Kaišiadorys
- 22920 Kaitduncan
- 25122 Kaitlingus
- 21675 Kaitlinmaria
- 30064 Kaitlynshin
- 20442 Kaiwünnemann
- 7475 Kaizuka
- 1519 Kajaani
- 79149 Kajigamori
- 4610 Kájov
- 5270 Kakabadze
- 25119 Kakani
- 231040 Kakaras
- 7252 Kakegawa
- 2894 Kakhovka
- 23165 Kakinchan
- 3597 Kakkuri
- 8892 Kakogawa
- 36426 Kakuda
- 52285 Kakurinji
- 12188 Kalaallitnunaat
- 40775 Kalafina
- 1702 Kalahari
- 66934 Kálalová
- 120349 Kalas
- 5976 Kalatajean
- 39930 Kalauch
- 73885 Kalaymoodley
- 3086 Kalbaugh
- 4138 Kalchas
- 24325 Kaleighanne
- 17851 Kaler
- 1454 Kalevala
- 8624 Kaleycuoco
- 28955 Kaliadeborah
- 92213 Kalina
- 12976 Kalinenkov
- 26214 Kalinga
- 33014 Kalinich
- 2699 Kalinin
- 15548 Kalinowski
- 197708 Kalipona
- 2840 Kallavesi
- 2805 Kalle
- 333514 Kallemeyn
- 28569 Kallenbach
- 10908 Kallestroetzel
- 22 Kalliope
- 204 Kallisto
- 10545 Källunge
- 2332 Kalm
- 4992 Kálmán
- 29824 Kalmančok
- 2287 Kalmykia
- 82092 Kalocsa
- 23663 Kalou
- 51826 Kalpanachawla
- 282897 Kaltenbrunner
- 7734 Kaltenegger
- 8150 Kaluga
- 10686 Kaluna
- 21393 Kalygeringer
- 53 Kalypso
- 1387 Kama
- 6134 Kamagari
- 402841 Kamakawiwoʻole
- 66667 Kambič
- 14909 Kamchatka
- 52292 Kamdzhalov
- 7289 Kamegamori
- 4254 Kamél
- 70936 Kámen
- 100728 Kamenice n Lipou
- 5385 Kamenka
- 12833 Kamenný Újezd
- 12796 Kamenrider
- 2428 Kamenyar
- 5435 Kameoka
- 58279 Kamerlingh
- 69228 Kamerunberg
- 7757 Kameya
- 12751 Kamihayashi
- 48680 Kamijo
- 21250 Kamikouchi
- 108720 Kamikuroiwa
- 14124 Kamil
- 648211 Kamilhairullin
- 4496 Kamimachi
- 27439 Kamimura
- 5978 Kaminokuni
- 30254 Kamiński
- 278735 Kamioka
- 17100 Kamiokanatsu
- 18156 Kamisaibara
- 26097 Kamishi
- 22736 Kamitaki
- 105675 Kamiukena
- 9791 Kamiyakurai
- 8045 Kamiyama
- 18891 Kamler
- 112233 Kammerer
- 185321 Kammerlander
- 4215 Kamo
- 469219 Kamoʻoalewa
- 9293 Kamogata
- 10143 Kamogawa
- 131358 Kamolergashev
- 14623 Kamoun
- 1948 Kampala
- 4410 Kamuimintara
- 13239 Kana
- 17683 Kanagawa
- 26168 Kanaikiyotaka
- 9866 Kanaimitsuo
- 20445 Kanakosakamoto
- 20063 Kanakoseki
- 9212 Kanamaru
- 7650 Kaname
- 32453 Kanamishogo
- 52500 Kanata
- 6976 Kanatsu
- 5333 Kanaya
- 14888 Kanazawashi
- 21262 Kanba
- 15370 Kanchi
- 2248 Kanda
- 48739 Kandachiyoko
- 12769 Kandakurenai
- 5750 Kandatai
- 2662 Kandinsky
- 126245 Kandókálmán
- 26394 Kandola
- 12008 Kandrup
- 17940 Kandyjarvis
- 711599 Kane
- 4717 Kaneko
- 21292 Kanetakoichi
- 10583 Kanetugu
- 31508 Kanevsky
- 28299 Kanghaoyan
- 31937 Kangsunwoo
- 4265 Kani
- 218087 Kaniansky
- 20870 Kaningher
- 22625 Kanipe
- 262284 Kanišauskas
- 120120 Kankelborg
- 145732 Kanmon
- 23468 Kannabe
- 13934 Kannami
- 9409 Kanpuzan
- 4963 Kanroku
- 3124 Kansas
- 6846 Kansazan
- 7083 Kant
- 24455 Kaňuchová
- 31313 Kanwingyi
- 567010 Kanyósándor
- 215080 Kaohsiung
- 3463 Kaokuen
- 9044 Kaoru
- 11842 Kap'bos
- 24587 Kapaneus
- 24352 Kapilrama
- 3437 Kapitsa
- 1987 Kaplan
- 29528 Kaplinski
- 23069 Kapps
- 818 Kapteynia
- 9141 Kapur
- 29619 Kapurubandage
- 6683 Karachentsov
- 8019 Karachkina
- 287787 Karády
- 233583 Karafiáth
- 6973 Karajan
- 4274 Karamanov
- 33583 Karamchedu
- 3719 Karamzin
- 32025 Karanjerath
- 14999 Karasaki
- 29514 Karatsu
- 3800 Karayusuf
- 363706 Karazija
- 1959 Karbyshev
- 39509 Kardashev
- 1682 Karel
- 22465 Karelanděl
- 11431 Karelbosscha
- 5514 Karelraška
- 352782 Karelschrijver
- 185757 Kareltrutnovský
- 12160 Karelwakker
- 19291 Karelzeman
- 2651 Karen
- 108382 Karencilevitz
- 21462 Karenedbal
- 24734 Kareness
- 25370 Karenfletch
- 23884 Karenharvey
- 20545 Karenhowell
- 351791 Karenkazuki
- 25229 Karenkitt
- 22102 Karenlamb
- 19801 Karenlemmon
- 17841 Karenlucci
- 34446 Karenmccoy
- 249300 Karenmortfield
- 12516 Karenyoung
- 28132 Karenzobel
- 4685 Karetnikov
- 4822 Karge
- 1676 Kariba
- 97646 Karifigueroa
- 90525 Karijanberg
- 166028 Karikókatalin
- 832 Karin
- 9945 Karinaxavier
- 28819 Karinritchey
- 84919 Karinthy
- 14542 Karitskaya
- 11115 Kariya
- 30786 Karkoschka
- 2807 Karl Marx
- 2125 Karl-Ontjes
- 58736 Karlantier
- 129061 Karlfortney
- 129330 Karlharshman
- 332706 Karlheidlas
- 9854 Karlheinz
- 25604 Karlin
- 4264 Karljosephine
- 15728 Karlmay
- 101383 Karloff
- 21356 Karlplank
- 23865 Karlsorensen
- 9623 Karlsson
- 10558 Karlstad
- 11364 Karlštejn
- 660798 Karltreusch
- 21110 Karlvalentin
- 201023 Karlwhittenburg
- 3811 Karma
- 20818 Karmadiraju
- 29127 Karnath
- 14806 Karner
- 17273 Karnik
- 6451 Kärnten
- 6323 Karoji
- 28672 Karolhiggins
- 547612 Károligáspár
- 20446 Karolinadziadura
- 2288 Karolinum
- 576793 Károlyiamy
- 231278 Kárpáti
- 90414 Karpov
- 670744 Karsh
- 25727 Karsonmiller
- 22868 Karst
- 32250 Karthik
- 3758 Karttunen
- 781 Kartvelia
- 7133 Kasahara
- 5834 Kasai
- 1316 Kasan
- 65541 Kasbek
- 7895 Kaseda
- 12982 Kaseybond
- 6811 Kashcheev
- 34107 Kashfiarahman
- 48686 Kashimura
- 1828 Kashirina
- 11664 Kashiwagi
- 13220 Kashiwagura
- 8994 Kashkashian
- 45510 Kashuba
- 21939 Kasmith
- 28235 Kasparvonbraun
- 376694 Kassák
- 114 Kassandra
- 12891 Kassandraholt
- 646 Kastalia
- 3982 Kastelʹ
- 12318 Kästner
- 7674 Kasuga
- 542026 Kaszásattila
- 731716 Käszlaci
- 3608 Kataev
- 1817 Katanga
- 10301 Kataoka
- 36800 Katarinawitt
- 8527 Katayama
- 32145 Katberman
- 24385 Katcagen
- 2156 Kate
- 27052 Katebush
- 22536 Katelowry
- 24378 Katelyngibbs
- 144692 Katemary
- 20447 Kateminker
- 34364 Katequinn
- 25978 Katerudolph
- 26273 Kateschafer
- 6750 Katgert
- 18697 Kathanson
- 320 Katharina
- 11466 Katharinaotto
- 26693 Katharinecorbin
- 20281 Kathartman
- 18992 Katharvard
- 22153 Kathbarnhart
- 17792 Kathconnelly
- 28558 Kathcordwell
- 31006 Katherine
- 145078 Katherinejohnson
- 28765 Katherinewu
- 25877 Katherinexue
- 24119 Katherinrose
- 18787 Kathermann
- 25987 Katherynshi
- 49350 Katheynix
- 13275 Kathgoetz
- 30022 Kathibaker
- 3754 Kathleen
- 209075 Kathleenharmon
- 5396 Kathleenhowell
- 12525 Kathleenloia
- 14250 Kathleenmartin
- 33990 Kathleenmcbride
- 28527 Kathleenrose
- 6340 Kathmandu
- 20448 Kathrinaltwegg
- 2612 Kathryn
- 33592 Kathrynanna
- 22923 Kathrynblair
- 316186 Kathrynjoyce
- 28096 Kathrynmarsh
- 175588 Kathrynsmith
- 30375 Kathuang
- 22596 Kathwallace
- 4711 Kathy
- 33255 Kathybush
- 20217 Kathyclemmer
- 22165 Kathydouglas
- 23010 Kathyfinch
- 11708 Kathyfries
- 27296 Kathyhurd
- 32048 Kathyliu
- 13313 Kathypeng
- 5914 Kathywhaler
- 43890 Katiaottani
- 291387 Katiebouman
- 33270 Katiecrysup
- 19766 Katiedavis
- 24548 Katieeverett
- 20449 Katiejoy
- 32112 Katiekumamoto
- 16245 Katielu
- 25131 Katiemelua
- 7981 Katieoakman
- 121715 Katiesalamy
- 1113 Katja
- 25685 Katlinhornig
- 5743 Kato
- 27003 Katoizumi
- 61444 Katokimiko
- 181392 Katonajózsef
- 43212 Katosawao
- 14426 Katotsuyoshi
- 29408 Katoyuko
- 31240 Katrianne
- 120353 Katrinajackson
- 14258 Katrinaminck
- 446500 Katrinraynor
- 12585 Katschwarz
- 7965 Katsuhiko
- 27815 Katsuhito
- 15368 Katsuji
- 22346 Katsumatatakashi
- 9067 Katsuno
- 26171 Katsunorikataoka
- 2961 Katsurahama
- 12469 Katsuura
- 21126 Katsuyoshi
- 7319 Katterfeld
- 11628 Katuhikoikeda
- 12400 Katumaru
- 10273 Katvolk
- 13680 Katyafrantseva
- 6182 Katygord
- 243000 Katysirles
- 1900 Katyusha
- 22981 Katz
- 216624 Kaufer
- 6806 Kaufmann
- 343439 Kaukali
- 5485 Kaula
- 5491 Kaulbach
- 73059 Kaunas
- 34433 Kavars
- 4251 Kavasch
- 154660 Kavelaars
- 1976 Kaverin
- 2949 Kaverznev
- 16229 Kavyakoneru
- 6832 Kawabata
- 12682 Kawada
- 7953 Kawaguchi
- 8911 Kawaguchijun
- 8413 Kawakami
- 7504 Kawakita
- 10352 Kawamura
- 9033 Kawane
- 37720 Kawanishi
- 24830 Kawanotomoyoshi
- 6269 Kawasaki
- 4910 Kawasato
- 23471 Kawatamasaaki
- 7410 Kawazoe
- 2564 Kayala
- 30769 Kaydash
- 6546 Kaye
- 18912 Kayfurman
- 21829 Kaylacornale
- 5271 Kaylamaya
- 202614 Kayleigh
- 299631 Kayliegreen
- 4421 Kayor
- 23791 Kaysonconlin
- 6110 Kazak
- 2178 Kazakhstania
- 5544 Kazakov
- 29299 Kazama
- 15598 Kazantsev
- 48650 Kazanuniversity
- 3477 Kazbegi
- 9551 Kazi
- 197192 Kazinczy
- 184096 Kazlauskas
- 11504 Kazo
- 25087 Kaztaniguchi
- 11294 Kazu
- 14495 Kazuakiwatanabe
- 26170 Kazuhiko
- 8582 Kazuhisa
- 12745 Kazujinishimura
- 8302 Kazukin
- 13540 Kazukitakahashi
- 6496 Kazuko
- 9746 Kazukoichikawa
- 29374 Kazumitsu
- 7031 Kazumiyoshioka
- 8087 Kazutaka
- 92614 Kazutami
- 7353 Kazuya
- 7293 Kazuyuki
- 14535 Kazuyukihanda
- 33932 Keane
- 321577 Keanureeves
- 333079 Keara
- 2712 Keaton
- 4110 Keats
- 5007 Keay
- 5811 Keck
- 339855 Kėdainiai
- 2261 Keeler
- 33586 Keeley
- 284054 Keeling
- 237164 Keelung
- 21498 Keenanferar
- 27238 Keenanmonks
- 19452 Keeney
- 5554 Keesey
- 9686 Keesom
- 10039 Keet Seel
- 9477 Kefennell
- 5005 Kegler
- 31959 Keianacave
- 14046 Keikai
- 8725 Keiko
- 9419 Keikochaki
- 42271 Keikokubota
- 7862 Keikonakamura
- 5054 Keil
- 10489 Keinonen
- 125473 Keisaku
- 8633 Keisukenagao
- 117610 Keithmahoney
- 159827 Keithmullen
- 6386 Keithnoll
- 46442 Keithtritton
- 15790 Keizan
- 69421 Keizosaji
- 497593 Kejimkujik
- 6324 Kejonuma
- 5402 Kejosmith
- 207481 Kékes
- 13254 Kekulé
- 2186 Keldysh
- 545784 Kelemenjános
- 265594 Keletiágnes
- 112798 Kelindsey
- 6773 Kellaway
- 52681 Kelleghan
- 5938 Keller
- 23270 Kellerman
- 4477 Kelley
- 21417 Kelleyharris
- 9530 Kelleymichael
- 20052 Kellman
- 34444 Kellmcallister
- 22312 Kelly
- 23271 Kellychacon
- 18805 Kellyday
- 115434 Kellyfast
- 27408 Kellyferguson
- 211232 Kellykevin
- 33917 Kellyoconnor
- 30149 Kellyriedell
- 28818 Kellyryan
- 13341 Kellysweeney
- 455207 Kellyyoder
- 28643 Kellyzhang
- 6260 Kelsey
- 28841 Kelseybarter
- 21853 Kelseykay
- 8003 Kelvin
- 78431 Kemble
- 11712 Kemcook
- 23729 Kemeisha
- 199696 Kemenesi
- 132718 Kemény
- 2140 Kemerovo
- 1508 Kemi
- 2932 Kempchinsky
- 26661 Kempelen
- 11789 Kempowski
- 3675 Kemstach
- 5933 Kemurdzhian
- 47627 Kendomanik
- 33898 Kendra
- 34152 Kendrazhang
- 25704 Kendrick
- 12537 Kendriddle
- 541801 Kendurkar
- 8743 Kèneke
- 121133 Kenflurchick
- 18237 Kenfreeman
- 15364 Kenglover
- 181670 Kengyun
- 18404 Kenichi
- 117582 Kenjikawai
- 9099 Kenjitanabe
- 24962 Kenjitoba
- 22580 Kenkaplan
- 152985 Kenkellermann
- 17555 Kenkennedy
- 55276 Kenlarner
- 99862 Kenlevin
- 21149 Kenmitchell
- 8546 Kenmotsu
- 22422 Kenmount Hill
- 21542 Kennajeannet
- 7166 Kennedy
- 34367 Kennedyrogers
- 547345 Kennethchambers
- 17930 Kennethott
- 17156 Kennethseitz
- 5348 Kennoguchi
- 10107 Kenny
- 2449 Kenos
- 13991 Kenphillips
- 5242 Kenreimonin
- 3714 Kenrussell
- 28628 Kensenshi
- 133074 Kenshamordola
- 22809 Kensiequade
- 28346 Kent
- 9977 Kentakunimoto
- 7036 Kentarohirata
- 300909 Kenthompson
- 365190 Kenting
- 97631 Kentrobinson
- 54720 Kentstevens
- 163470 Kenwallis
- 17046 Kenway
- 14075 Kenwill
- 70783 Kenwilliams
- 84951 Kenwilson
- 1278 Kenya
- 25180 Kenyonconlin
- 178155 Kenzaarraki
- 6931 Kenzaburo
- 35274 Kenziarino
- 5526 Kenzo
- 8375 Kenzokohno
- 49440 Kenzotange
- 579785 Kepesgyula
- 1134 Kepler
- 17781 Kepping
- 207655 Kerboguan
- 2216 Kerch
- 19587 Keremane
- 168203 Kereszturi
- 11432 Kerkhoven
- 24503 Kero
- 442721 Kerouac
- 20452 Kerraouch
- 138016 Kerribeisser
- 299756 Kerryaileen
- 53258 Kerryannlecky
- 23680 Kerryking
- 60609 Kerryprice
- 278417 Kerschbaum
- 842 Kerstin
- 154141 Kertész
- 6384 Kervin
- 25594 Kessler
- 202787 Kestecher
- 418220 Kęstutis
- 25570 Kesun
- 318694 Keszthelyi
- 124075 Ketelsen
- 15023 Ketover
- 10290 Kettering
- 9151 Kettnergriswold
- 16756 Keuskamp
- 136848 Kevanpooler
- 23739 Kevin
- 120196 Kevinballou
- 120215 Kevinberry
- 27478 Kevinbloh
- 28556 Kevinchen
- 18907 Kevinclaytor
- 27432 Kevinconley
- 28935 Kevincyr
- 25674 Kevinellis
- 16129 Kevingao
- 30085 Kevingarbe
- 24524 Kevinhawkins
- 21964 Kevinhousen
- 128373 Kevinjohnson
- 20021 Kevinkell
- 25490 Kevinkelly
- 18090 Kevinkuo
- 20393 Kevinlane
- 30033 Kevinlee
- 239282 Kevinmccarron
- 16934 Kevinmeng
- 121593 Kevinmiller
- 184778 Kevinoberheim
- 11210 Kevinqian
- 7454 Kevinrighter
- 32074 Kevinsadhu
- 129165 Kevinstout
- 20302 Kevinwang
- 13721 Kevinwelsh
- 27540 Kevinwhite
- 211380 Kevinwoyjeck
- 25993 Kevinxu
- 16221 Kevinyang
- 25118 Kevlin
- 2291 Kevo
- 1540 Kevola
- 33826 Kevynadams
- 7666 Keyaki
- 9917 Keynes
- 561911 Kézandor
- 13302 Kezmoh
- 574570 Khabibullin
- 18174 Khachatryan
- 5936 Khadzhinov
- 19438 Khaki
- 468725 Khalat
- 1357 Khama
- 279119 Khamatova
- 33393 Khandelwal
- 12068 Khandrika
- 3068 Khanina
- 2147 Kharadze
- 15898 Kharasterteam
- 9263 Khariton
- 9167 Kharkiv
- 10685 Kharkivuniver
- 10675 Kharlamov
- 6766 Kharms
- 30177 Khashayar
- 4802 Khatchaturian
- 12565 Khege
- 34293 Khiemdoba
- 325436 Khlebov
- 26685 Khojandi
- 70418 Kholopov
- 3504 Kholshevnikov
- 4428 Khotinok
- 4515 Khrennikov
- 5955 Khromchenko
- 372578 Khromov
- 4707 Khryses
- 10681 Khture
- 3362 Khufu
- 7995 Khvorostovsky
- 26451 Khweis
- 11011 KIAM
- 18794 Kianafrank
- 251638 Kianamcfadden
- 3751 Kiang
- 2077 Kiangsu
- 4952 Kibeshigemaro
- 3319 Kibi
- 9916 Kibirev
- 14500 Kibo
- 5140 Kida
- 3779 Kieffer
- 17521 Kiek
- 1759 Kienle
- 662131 Kierancarroll
- 7056 Kierkegaard
- 606339 Kierpiec
- 33879 Kierstendeen
- 1788 Kiess
- 2171 Kiev
- 6576 Kievtech
- 7202 Kigoshi
- 16449 Kigoyama
- 4795 Kihara
- 191582 Kikadolfi
- 165167 Kikkawatsuneie
- 4743 Kikuchi
- 18473 Kikuchijun
- 12388 Kikunokai
- 8492 Kikuoka
- 23443 Kikwaya
- 4737 Kiladze
- 14764 Kilauea
- 470 Kilia
- 28059 Kiliaan
- 10377 Kilimanjaro
- 12070 Kilkis
- 3907 Kilmartin
- 3142 Kilopi
- 14111 Kimamos
- 34400 Kimbaxter
- 20453 Kimberleylim
- 172505 Kimberlyespy
- 28053 Kimberlyputnam
- 22547 Kimberscott
- 11947 Kimclijsters
- 15557 Kimcochran
- 30203 Kimdavis
- 25103 Kimdongyoung
- 23734 Kimgyehyun
- 20544 Kimhansell
- 10062 Kimhay
- 27739 Kimihiro
- 213255 Kimiyayui
- 95016 Kimjeongho
- 30235 Kimmiller
- 25105 Kimnayeon
- 28816 Kimneville
- 9339 Kimnovak
- 67712 Kimotsuki
- 19811 Kimperkins
- 21729 Kimrichards
- 72432 Kimrobinson
- 12771 Kimshin
- 30248 Kimstinson
- 6233 Kimura
- 9407 Kimuranaoto
- 7575 Kimuraseiji
- 10821 Kimuratakeshi
- 24025 Kimwallin
- 15603 Kimyoonji
- 37218 Kimyoonyoung
- 161975 Kincsem
- 42354 Kindleberger
- 8986 Kineyayasuyo
- 2305 King
- 600867 Kinghu
- 11778 Kingsford Smith
- 175203 Kingston
- 304826 Kini
- 18553 Kinkakuji
- 14446 Kinkowan
- 755922 Kinmen
- 22852 Kinney
- 54563 Kinokonasu
- 7250 Kinoshita
- 10569 Kinoshitamasao
- 11155 Kinpu
- 31682 Kinsey
- 15921 Kintaikyo
- 6636 Kintanar
- 15358 Kintner
- 7826 Kinugasa
- 8483 Kinwalaniihsia
- 39285 Kipkeino
- 2947 Kippenhahn
- 1780 Kippes
- 16740 Kipthorne
- 1156 Kira
- 26251 Kiranmanne
- 28537 Kirapowell
- 541631 Kirbulychev
- 51985 Kirby
- 216752 Kirbyrunyon
- 225232 Kircheva
- 100045 Kirchherr
- 10358 Kirchhoff
- 16441 Kirchner
- 16128 Kirfrieda
- 2566 Kirghizia
- 22134 Kirian
- 11146 Kirigamine
- 3588 Kirik
- 91890 Kiriko Matsuri
- 2609 Kiril-Metodi
- 6764 Kirillavrov
- 27626 Kirkbender
- 19578 Kirkdouglas
- 27527 Kirkkoehler
- 19589 Kirkland
- 9902 Kirkpatrick
- 1578 Kirkwood
- 4447 Kirov
- 5570 Kirsan
- 9834 Kirsanov
- 27711 Kirschvink
- 31771 Kirstenwright
- 7559 Kirstinemeyer
- 6273 Kiruna
- 6275 Kiryu
- 4994 Kisala
- 4208 Kiselev
- 12673 Kiselman
- 39558 Kishine
- 35299 Kishisayoko
- 21010 Kishon
- 28508 Kishore
- 117714 Kiskartal
- 2271 Kiso
- 12278 Kisohinoki
- 8267 Kiss
- 21450 Kissel
- 554879 Kissgyula
- 113202 Kisslászló
- 4409 Kissling
- 199688 Kisspéter
- 12180 Kistemaker
- 811529 Kiszelymárta
- 46595 Kita-Kyushu
- 217726 Kitabeppu
- 9217 Kitagawa
- 12012 Kitahiroshima
- 469773 Kitaibel
- 32858 Kitakamigawa
- 3785 Kitami
- 7954 Kitao
- 38636 Kitazato
- 4188 Kitezh
- 2322 Kitt Peak
- 24269 Kittappa
- 314163 Kittenberger
- 2679 Kittisvaara
- 9563 Kitty
- 73358 Kitwhitten
- 5481 Kiuchi
- 251633 Kivelson
- 4181 Kivi
- 27887 Kiyoharu
- 7525 Kiyohira
- 21188 Kiyohiro
- 4375 Kiyomori
- 25075 Kiyomoto
- 5488 Kiyosato
- 7067 Kiyose
- 54564 Kiyoshiizumi
- 8696 Kjeriksson
- 343743 Kjurkchieva
- 16958 Klaasen
- 24949 Klačka
- 19914 Klagenfurt
- 23190 Klages-Mundt
- 140628 Klaipėda
- 14699 Klarasmi
- 1825 Klare
- 7277 Klass
- 35459 Klaurieger
- 333490 Klaus
- 217576 Klausbirkner
- 6506 Klausheide
- 619137 Klausjugelt
- 13028 Klaustschira
- 243096 Klauswerner
- 4019 Klavetter
- 2781 Kleczek
- 10543 Klee
- 5688 Kleewyck
- 12045 Klein
- 214378 Kleinmann
- 11868 Kleinrichert
- 31377 Kleinwort
- 8053 Kleist
- 3921 Klementʹev
- 3386 Klementinum
- 5796 Klemm
- 1723 Klemola
- 134348 Klemperer
- 42377 KLENOT
- 216 Kleopatra
- 3978 Klepešta
- 7130 Klepper
- 21945 Kleshchonok
- 30286 Klesman
- 2199 Kleť
- 5336 Kley
- 9287 Klima
- 392440 Klimavičius
- 22757 Klimcak
- 3903 Kliment Ohridski
- 19763 Klimesh
- 3653 Klimishin
- 361524 Klimka
- 535769 Klimkovsky
- 30725 Klimov
- 16445 Klimt
- 22369 Klinger
- 26652 Klinglesmith
- 9511 Klingsor
- 10427 Klinkenberg
- 112328 Klinkerfues
- 25640 Klintefelt
- 84 Klio
- 212723 Klitschko
- 25111 Klokun
- 3166 Klondike
- 22199 Klonios
- 3520 Klopsteg
- 9344 Klopstock
- 149728 Klostermann
- 97 Klotho
- 583 Klotilde
- 10222 Klotz
- 17993 Kluesing
- 159743 Kluk
- 1040 Klumpkea
- 321046 Klushantsev
- 16710 Kluyver
- 9578 Klyazma
- 104 Klymene
- 179 Klytaemnestra
- 55676 Klythios
- 73 Klytia
- 73610 Klyuchevskaya
- 4560 Klyuchevskij
- 20065 Kminek
- 4312 Knacke
- 159826 Knapp
- 23186 Knauss
- 18286 Kneipp
- 3900 Knežević
- 1384 Kniertje
- 32899 Knigge
- 29391 Knight
- 29329 Knobelsdorff
- 16438 Knöfel
- 1311 Knopfia
- 346666 Knorozov
- 14339 Knorre
- 3004 Knud
- 4868 Knushevia
- 21656 Knuth
- 8534 Knutsson
- 11269 Knyr
- 1324 Knysna
- 6498 Ko
- 27590 Koarimatsu
- 12031 Kobaton
- 3500 Kobayashi
- 43899 Kobayashihiroki
- 8120 Kobe
- 13176 Kobedaitenken
- 1164 Kobolda
- 7238 Kobori
- 1233 Kobresia
- 3432 Kobuchizawa
- 11154 Kobushi
- 2427 Kobzar
- 3399 Kobzon
- 48934 Kočanová
- 10847 Koch
- 2087 Kochera
- 63528 Kocherhans
- 115950 Kocherpeter
- 406957 Kochetova
- 2396 Kochi
- 4411 Kochibunkyo
- 12690 Kochimiraikagaku
- 6763 Kochiny
- 168767 Kochte
- 6217 Kodai
- 4291 Kodaihasu
- 6500 Kodaira
- 286693 Kodaitis
- 10918 Kodaly
- 13564 Kodomomiraikan
- 5206 Kodomonomori
- 15963 Koeberl
- 26426 Koechl
- 6330 Koen
- 12951 Koenkuijken
- 75063 Koestler
- 17516 Kogayukihito
- 5684 Kogo
- 7430 Kogure
- 22467 Koharumi
- 15806 Kohei
- 27991 Koheijimiura
- 14047 Kohichiro
- 11775 Köhler
- 13801 Kohlhase
- 4177 Kohman
- 5113 Kohno
- 1850 Kohoutek
- 3370 Kohsai
- 14445 Koichi
- 14515 Koichisato
- 17629 Koichisuzuki
- 20070 Koichiyuko
- 49702 Koikeda
- 21545 Koirala
- 6097 Koishikawa
- 5454 Kojiki
- 4886 Kojima
- 24911 Kojimashigemi
- 36264 Kojimatsumoto
- 10355 Kojiroharada
- 17544 Kojiroishikawa
- 3644 Kojitaku
- 24533 Kokhirova
- 1522 Kokkola
- 21076 Kokoschka
- 42772 Kokotanekova
- 3373 Koktebelia
- 24158 Kokubo
- 87271 Kokubunji
- 15526 Kokura
- 11873 Kokuseibi
- 9154 Kolʹtsovo
- 23648 Kolář
- 74370 Kolářjan
- 7315 Kolbe
- 546235 Kolbenheyer
- 157721 Kölcsey
- 11352 Koldewey
- 651370 Kolen
- 14354 Kolesnikov
- 191 Kolga
- 1929 Kollaa
- 34743 Kollipara
- 2467 Kollontai
- 8827 Kollwitz
- 48410 Kolmogorov
- 13723 Kolokolova
- 269251 Kolomna
- 270556 Kolonica
- 175281 Kolonics
- 6619 Kolya
- 8803 Kolyer
- 15267 Kolyma
- 3219 Komaki
- 1836 Komarov
- 14469 Komatsuataka
- 9103 Komatsubara
- 6983 Komatsusakyo
- 3958 Komendantov
- 1861 Komenský
- 10572 Kominejo
- 21642 Kominers
- 20363 Komitov
- 6405 Komiyama
- 541200 Komjádibéla
- 39741 Komm
- 6744 Komoda
- 709844 Komoniecki
- 5377 Komori
- 1406 Komppa
- 1283 Komsomolia
- 6246 Komurotoru
- 284891 Kona
- 3003 Konček
- 7106 Kondakov
- 26331 Kondamuri
- 6144 Kondojiro
- 574546 Kondorgusztáv
- 48748 Kondoshusaku
- 22394 Kondouakira
- 3084 Kondratyuk
- 21546 Konermann
- 14794 Konetskiy
- 13686 Kongozan
- 3815 König
- 181824 Königsleiten
- 10949 Königstuhl
- 29252 Konjikido
- 4526 Konko
- 11254 Konkohekisui
- 1445 Konkolya
- 7901 Konnai
- 12157 Können
- 162011 Konnohmaru
- 8322 Kononovich
- 3965 Konopleva
- 1890 Konoshenkova
- 18121 Konovalenko
- 246171 Konrad
- 9028 Konrádbeneš
- 7146 Konradin
- 21664 Konradzuse
- 3347 Konstantin
- 405207 Konstanz
- 22250 Konstfrolov
- 2008 Konstitutsiya
- 278645 Kontsevych
- 18301 Konyukhov
- 208664 Koojunyup
- 12242 Koon
- 12625 Koopman
- 55382 Kootinlok
- 669952 Kootker
- 2628 Kopal
- 565780 Kopaszimre
- 1631 Kopff
- 34246 Kopparapu
- 6361 Koppel
- 52295 Köppen
- 10631 Koppes
- 7973 Koppeschaar
- 3968 Koptelov
- 9932 Kopylov
- 10201 Korado
- 5482 Korankei
- 1505 Koranna
- 214558 Korányi
- 8530 Korbokkur
- 2163 Korczak
- 940 Kordula
- 4377 Koremori
- 2988 Korhonen
- 27182 Korinotenmondai
- 17901 Korinriske
- 4357 Korinthos
- 243262 Korkosz
- 306020 Kormilov
- 17368 Korn
- 18302 Körner
- 21643 Kornev
- 23899 Kornoš
- 296905 Korochantsev
- 18322 Korokan
- 3835 Korolenko
- 1855 Korolev
- 4883 Korolirina
- 14181 Koromházi
- 158 Koronis
- 185250 Korostyshiv
- 231649 Korotkiy
- 337700 Korpás
- 5116 Korsør
- 16144 Korsten
- 2966 Korsunia
- 9685 Korteweg
- 546098 Kosaka
- 673014 Kósakissattila
- 21686 Koschny
- 90698 Kościuszko
- 188576 Kosenda
- 12440 Koshigayaboshi
- 18161 Koshiishi
- 20458 Koshkin
- 31874 Kosiarek
- 16869 Košinár
- 1697 Koskenniemi
- 15609 Kosmaczewski
- 2072 Kosmodemyanskaya
- 8339 Kosovichia
- 29897 Kossen
- 90376 Kossuth
- 27961 Kostelecký
- 3134 Kostinsky
- 328509 Kostyahrubych
- 10672 Kostyukova
- 221528 Kosztolányi
- 275225 Kotarbinski
- 2726 Kotelnikov
- 77621 Koten
- 10747 Köthen
- 2737 Kotka
- 3914 Kotogahama
- 8246 Kotov
- 21547 Kottapalli
- 10416 Kottler
- 8286 Kouji
- 8957 Koujounotsuki
- 10213 Koukolík
- 9147 Kourakuen
- 4964 Kourovka
- 23070 Koussa
- 1799 Koussevitzky
- 28883 Kouveliotou
- 17002 Kouzel
- 867 Kovacia
- 225096 Kovácsgéza
- 230656 Kovácspál
- 16419 Kovalev
- 1859 Kovalevskaya
- 33058 Kovařík
- 12010 Kovářov
- 117713 Kövesligethy
- 17794 Kowalinski
- 7392 Kowalski
- 571000 Kowright
- 3383 Koyama
- 13163 Koyamachuya
- 5591 Koyo
- 121121 Koyoharugotoge
- 31512 Koyyalagunta
- 3040 Kozai
- 546275 Kozák
- 8229 Kozelský
- 76628 Kozí Hrádek
- 23406 Kozlov
- 4944 Kozlovskij
- 240364 Kozmutza
- 10368 Kozuki
- 2536 Kozyrev
- 74227 Kraan-Korteweg
- 183289 Krabbendam
- 3712 Kraft
- 85047 Krakatau
- 8682 Kräklingbo
- 46977 Krakow
- 159799 Kralice
- 5715 Kramer
- 13824 Kramlik
- 7516 Kranjc
- 407243 Krapivin
- 7694 Krasetín
- 14069 Krasheninnikov
- 5714 Krasinsky
- 11886 Kraske
- 7370 Krasnogolovets
- 38046 Krasnoyarsk
- 85466 Krastins
- 424613 Kraszewski
- 305263 Krasznahorkai
- 3036 Krat
- 25427 Kratchmarov
- 235621 Kratochvíle
- 14262 Kratzer
- 27049 Kraus
- 9761 Krautter
- 8812 Kravtsov
- 35233 Krčín
- 158913 Kreider
- 6597 Kreil
- 7945 Kreisau
- 29473 Krejčí
- 13922 Kremenia
- 6457 Kremsmünster
- 4249 Křemže
- 13055 Kreppein
- 1849 Kresák
- 5981 Kresilas
- 464150 Kresken
- 548 Kressida
- 301638 Kressin
- 800 Kressmannia
- 242523 Kreszgéza
- 5285 Krethon
- 321045 Kretinga
- 12986 Kretke
- 9938 Kretlow
- 488 Kreusa
- 3635 Kreutz
- 7604 Kridsadaporn
- 149244 Kriegh
- 242 Kriemhild
- 7469 Krikalev
- 8323 Krimigis
- 8391 Kring
- 2887 Krinov
- 3233 Krišbarons
- 11261 Krisbecker
- 10629 Krishnamani
- 22533 Krishnan
- 183560 Křišťan
- 34406 Kristenconn
- 178803 Kristenjohnson
- 3455 Kristensen
- 440833 Kristenwalbolt
- 27620 Kristenwalsh
- 7931 Kristianpedersen
- 129108 Kristianwaldorff
- 19008 Kristibutler
- 33872 Kristichung
- 4038 Kristina
- 19430 Kristinaufer
- 42665 Kristinblock
- 25669 Kristinrose
- 134134 Kristoferdrozd
- 275264 Krisztike
- 26475 Krisztisugar
- 32019 Krithikaiyer
- 34831 Krithikramesh
- 30302 Kritilall
- 24260 Kriváň
- 17174 Krivitsky
- 23583 Křivský
- 5719 Křižík
- 24751 Kroemer
- 5927 Krogh
- 20238 Krohm
- 10469 Krohn
- 3102 Krok
- 17412 Kroll
- 31238 Kroměříž
- 167875 Kromminga
- 2796 Kron
- 25624 Kronecker
- 48300 Kronk
- 2447 Kronstadt
- 269742 Kroónorbert
- 6842 Krosigk
- 239307 Kruchynenko
- 17036 Krugly
- 69469 Krumbenowe
- 20894 Krumeich
- 605499 Krupko
- 18412 Kruszelnicki
- 31925 Krutovskiy
- 269589 Kryachko
- 7226 Kryl
- 5021 Krylania
- 5247 Krylov
- 29081 Krymradio
- 245890 Krynychenka
- 28720 Krystalrose
- 27141 Krystleleung
- 17702 Kryštofharant
- 18004 Krystosek
- 31375 Krystufek
- 21776 Kryszczyńska
- 32734 Kryukov
- 114025 Krzesinski
- 20459 Krzysztoflangner
- 4997 Ksana
- 11227 Ksenborisova
- 15397 Ksoari
- 32518 Ktramesh
- 21670 Kuan
- 29509 Kuangtingyun
- 14968 Kubáček
- 243204 Kubanchoria
- 15530 Kuber
- 34484 Kubetzko
- 20470 Kubica
- 11598 Kubík
- 6700 Kubišová
- 6140 Kubokawa
- 49442 Kubokoichi
- 9422 Kuboniwa
- 8930 Kubota
- 255261 Kubovics
- 10221 Kubrick
- 143139 Kučáková
- 226672 Kučinskas
- 92251 Kuconis
- 6449 Kudara
- 319009 Kudirka
- 30301 Kuditipudi
- 22423 Kudlacek
- 9981 Kudo
- 13561 Kudogou
- 12342 Kudohmichiko
- 353903 Kudritzki
- 20471 Kueny
- 12568 Kuffner
- 5875 Kuga
- 120375 Kugel
- 11313 Kügelgen
- 2296 Kugultinov
- 43813 Kühner
- 1776 Kuiper
- 36774 Kuittinen
- 6866 Kukai
- 1954 Kukarkin
- 2159 Kukkamäki
- 7118 Kuklov
- 23444 Kukučín
- 601731 Kukuczka
- 178151 Kulangsu
- 17815 Kulawik
- 542246 Kulcsár
- 31267 Kuldiga
- 5809 Kulibin
- 2794 Kulik
- 1774 Kulikov
- 2497 Kulikovskij
- 3019 Kulin
- 257211 Kulizoli
- 11013 Kullander
- 836465 Kulmatycki
- 6255 Kuma
- 5783 Kumagaya
- 7472 Kumakiri
- 8104 Kumamori
- 9993 Kumamoto
- 8922 Kumanodake
- 32483 Kumar
- 34343 Kumaran
- 200234 Kumashiro
- 15246 Kumeta
- 4454 Kumiko
- 33727 Kummel
- 25628 Kummer
- 3569 Kumon
- 11133 Kumotori
- 8627 Kunalnayyar
- 32298 Kunalshroff
- 18780 Kuncham
- 7390 Kundera
- 553 Kundry
- 936 Kunigunde
- 4403 Kuniharu
- 6964 Kunihiko
- 7176 Kuniji
- 7189 Kuniko
- 2280 Kunikov
- 18976 Kunilraval
- 6908 Kunimoto
- 9673 Kunishimakoto
- 9257 Kunisuke
- 29905 Kunitaka
- 6100 Kunitomoikkansai
- 16625 Kunitsugu
- 11074 Kuniwake
- 3613 Kunlun
- 224858 Kunmária
- 3650 Kunming
- 28116 Kunovac
- 33319 Kunqu
- 6847 Kunz-Hallstein
- 11167 Kunžak
- 1503 Kuopio
- 20843 Kuotzuhao
- 9487 Kupe
- 9692 Kuperus
- 5363 Kupka
- 9528 Küppers
- 3618 Kuprin
- 10326 Kuragano
- 4578 Kurashiki
- 7254 Kuratani
- 869243 Kuraten
- 26205 Kuratowski
- 2352 Kurchatov
- 2349 Kurchenko
- 76310 Kurczewski
- 7201 Kuritariku
- 24794 Kurland
- 395148 Kurnin
- 8933 Kurobe
- 7241 Kuroda
- 6276 Kurohone
- 7436 Kuroiwa
- 10365 Kurokawa
- 9656 Kurokawahiroki
- 176866 Kuropatkin
- 23938 Kurosaki
- 254749 Kurosawa
- 54827 Kurpfalz
- 3073 Kursk
- 550942 Kurtág
- 16044 Kurtbachmann
- 73670 Kurthopf
- 132798 Kürti
- 33011 Kurtiscarsch
- 5470 Kurtlindstrom
- 489603 Kurtschreckling
- 16874 Kurtwahl
- 6629 Kurtz
- 140038 Kurushima
- 5112 Kusaji
- 7421 Kusaka
- 24757 Kusano
- 39635 Kusatao
- 13792 Kuščynskyj
- 22782 Kushalnaik
- 5605 Kushida
- 26806 Kushiike
- 10613 Kushinadahime
- 4096 Kushiro
- 32263 Kusnierkiewicz
- 17260 Kušnirák
- 1559 Kustaanheimo
- 642097 Kusturica
- 30032 Kuszmaul
- 20965 Kutafin
- 1289 Kutaïssi
- 223877 Kutler
- 10682 Kutryk
- 5218 Kutsak
- 29645 Kutsenok
- 2492 Kutuzov
- 634539 Kuvaev
- 7251 Kuwabara
- 5629 Kuwana
- 6867 Kuwano
- 34509 Kuwehan
- 3049 Kuzbass
- 291923 Kuzmaskryabin
- 22010 Kuzmina
- 2233 Kuznetsov
- 12752 Kvarnis
- 4190 Kvasnica
- 245877 Kvassay
- 49110 Květafialová
- 29476 Kvíčala
- 3331 Kvistaberg
- 8137 Kvíz
- 23324 Kwak
- 5240 Kwasan
- 4646 Kwee
- 80675 Kwentus
- 7789 Kwiatkowski
- 32038 Kwiecinski
- 9162 Kwiila
- 103220 Kwongchuikuen
- 29125 Kyivphysfak
- 274334 Kyivplaniy
- 28133 Kylebardwell
- 20902 Kylebeighle
- 27390 Kyledavis
- 28590 Kyledilger
- 25696 Kylejones
- 30113 Kylerkuehn
- 159013 Kyleturner
- 20528 Kyleyawn
- 25198 Kylienicole
- 32525 Kynanhughson
- 4127 Kyogoku
- 35441 Kyoko
- 7773 Kyokuchiken
- 58707 Kyoshi
- 4352 Kyoto
- 669 Kypria
- 33623 Kyraseevers
- 12556 Kyrobinson
- 281459 Kyrylenko
- 300932 Kyslyuk
- 84224 Kyte
- 570 Kythera
- 6980 Kyusakamoto
back to top

== See also ==
- List of minor planet discoverers
- List of observatory codes
- Meanings of minor planet names § Index
