= Latvian names in space =

There are a number of objects in the Solar System that have been named after Latvian people or places. Many of these are craters on the terrestrial planets but asteroids and exoplanets have also received Latvian names.

== Mars ==
- Auce crater
- Talsi crater

== Asteroids ==
- 1796 Riga
- 1284 Latvia
- 1805 Dirikis
- 2867 Šteins
- 3233 Krišbarons
