= List of named minor planets (alphabetical) =

Minor planets grouped by the first letter of their name. Names rarely begin with "Q" or "X", but often with "S". (Note: For a minor-planet name starting with a character that is not convertible into a Latin one, the second character of its name is used instead. Examples include 469705 ǂKá̦gára (added to names starting with "K") and 374710 ʻOʻo (to be found in the partial list for letter "O").)

This is a list of named minor planets in an alphabetical, case-insensitive order grouped by the first letter of their name. (Note: The following partial lists of named minor planets highlight objects for which no article exists on Wikipedia. Links for such objects redirect to the list of minor planets and are displayed in grey rather than blue color. Designations are always given without parentheses (see permanent syntax).) New namings, typically proposed by the discoverer and approved by the Working Group for Small Bodies Nomenclature (WGSBN) of the International Astronomical Union, are published nowadays in their WGSBN Bulletin and summarized in a dedicated list several times a year.

Over the last four decades, the list has grown significantly with an average rate of 492 new namings published every year (or 1.35 namings per day). While in March 1979, only 1,924 minor planets had received a name and completed the designation process, as of 26 May 2026, the list contains 26,067 named objects. This, however, only accounts for 2.94% of all numbered bodies, as there are 887,103 numbered minor planets with a well established orbit which is a precondition for receiving a name.

== See also ==
- List of minor planet discoverers
- List of minor planets named after people
- List of minor planets named after places
- List of minor planets named after rivers
- List of observatory codes
- Meanings of minor planet names § Index
