= Alpaidze =

Alpaidze may refer to:

== People ==
- Galaktion Alpaidze (1916-2006), a Soviet military leader

== Objects ==
- 11824 Alpaidze, a main belt asteroid
