= Parajanov (disambiguation) =

Sergei Parajanov (1924–1990) was an Armenian-Georgian filmmaker.

Parajanov, Paradjanov or Paradzhanov may also refer to:

- Paradjanov (film), a 2013 Ukrainian biographical drama film
- Parajanov: The Last Spring, a 1992 documentary film
- 3963 Paradzhanov, an asteroid named for Sergei Parajanov

== See also ==
- Parajanov-Vartanov Institute, an American film organization
