= David Kugultinov =

David Nikitich Kugultinov (Russian: Давид Никитич Кугультинов, [daˈvʲit nʲɪˈkʲitʲɪt͡ɕ kʊɡʊlʲˈtʲinəf], Oirat: Көглтин Дава, romanized: Kögltin Dava, [kœɡəlˈtin daˈva], 13 March 1922 – 17 June 2006) was a Soviet and Kalmyk whose acclaim and prominence made him a recipient of numerous honors and awards, including the title, "National Poet of the Republic of Kalmykia."

A minor planet 2296 Kugultinov discovered in 1975 by Soviet astronomer Lyudmila Chernykh is named after him.
