= Konstitutsiya =

Konstitutsiya, a word meaning "constitution" in the Russian language, may refer to:

- Constitution of Russia (Russian: Конституция Российской Федерации, romanized: Konstitutsiya Rossiyskoy Federatsii)
- Constitution of the Soviet Union (Russian: Конституция СССР, romanized: Konstitutsiya SSSR)
- 2008 Konstitutsiya, an asteroid named for the Constitution of the Soviet Union
