= Galaktion Alpaidze =

Soviet lieutenant general (1916–2006)

Galaktion Yeliseyevich Alpaidze
- Georgian: გალაქტიონ ალფაიძე Russian: Галактио́н Елисе́евич Алпаи́дзе
- Born: 7 November 1916; Kursebi, Russian Empire (now in Tqibuli District, Georgia)
- Died: 2 May 2006 (aged 89); Moscow, Russian Federation
- Burial place: Troyekurovskoye Cemetery, Moscow
- Military career
- Allegiance: Soviet Union; Russia
- Branch: Soviet Army
- Service years: 1938–1975
- Rank: Lieutenant General
- Commands: 36th Artillery Regiment (53rd Infantry Division, 7th Guard Army); 972nd Artillery Regiment (113th Infantry Division, 57th Army, Ukrainian Front); Artillery Infantry Division (Stalingrad); North Caucasus Military District (head of training ground and anti aircraft artillery); 4th Artillery Division (1957–1959); Head of ballistic missile research; Head of Plesetsk Cosmodrome (1963–1975)
- Conflicts: World War II; Battle of Moscow; Battle of the Dnieper; Battle of Romania; Battle of Debrecen; Vienna Offensive
- Awards: Hero of the Soviet Union; USSR State Prize
- Other work: Deputy of the Supreme Soviet of the Soviet Union (1946–1950); Director and supervisor of the Plesetsk Cosmodrome (1963–1975); Deputy Director, Moscow Institute of Thermal Technology (1975–1992)

Galaktion Yeliseyevich Alpaidze (Georgian: გალაქტიონ ალფაიძე, Russian: Галактио́н Елисе́евич Алпаи́дзе; 7 November 1916 [O.S. 25 October] – 2 May 2006) was a Russian military officer of Georgian ethnicity in the former Soviet Army whose career saw military actions in the eastern front of the World War II.

Besides his career in the army, Alpaidze was a program manager in the former Soviet space program and was a director of the Plesetsk Cosmosdrome from 1963–1975 and was a recipient of the Hero of the Soviet Union, and 1977 laureate of the USSR State Prize.

== Early life ==
Alpaidze was born on 7 November 1916 to Georgian village peasants and raised in the settlement of Kursebi in Georgia (then part of the Russian Empire). He finished a seven-year educational curriculum and graduated from the Kutaisi Industrial College in 1937, primarily studying heat and energy development technology. For two years he worked as an electrician in a hydroelectric power plant before entering Red Army service in 1938. In 1940 Alpaidze graduated from the Tbilisi School of Artillery.

== Great Patriotic War ==
At the outbreak of war in June 1941, as a major Alpaidze was already the deputy commander of an artillery battalion of the 36th artillery regiment, Soviet 43rd army. He participated in the Battle of Moscow and defensive operations around the river Desna from August to October 1943. In that period he also became a member of the CPSU. In September 1943, Alpaidze took command over the 36th Artillery Regiment which by then was already merged to the 7th Guard Army. He and his regiment took part in the crossing of the Dnieper and from 1 to 8 October, repulsed dozens of attacks at the bridgehead of the river, destroying numerous German tanks, guns, armoured vehicles, troop carriers and one infantry battalion. Afterwards the regiment moved to the Battle of Romania and the Vienna Offensive. In March 1945 Major Alpaidze distinguished himself again during the Balaton Offensive when his newly assigned 972nd Artillery Regiment of the 113th Rifle Division destroyed a number of German tanks and around 30 firing points, while at the same time suppressing six enemy artillery batteries. On 11 March, on a single day, he got wounded a total of three times but still managed to coordinate and control the fire of his units. For courage and heroism in battle, Alpaidze was awarded the title Hero of the Soviet Union as well as the Order of Lenin on 28 April 1945.

== Cold War ==
After World War II, Galaktion Yeliseyevich Alpaidze continued service in the Southern Group of Soviet Forces, later applying to the Dzerzhinsky Military Academy. When graduating, he became Colonel and took over command of an Infantry Artillery Division stationed in Stalingrad. Further, in 1957 he graduated from the Voroshilov General Staff Academy and was promoted Major General. In the years 1953–1955 Alpaidze was commander of the training ground and anti aircraft artillery in the North Caucasus Military District and in 1957–1959 commander of the 4th Artillery Division. In 1959, due to his knowledge about thermal technology, he was appointed deputy head of the missile test side in Kapustin Yar. At the end of 1962 during the Cuban Missile Crisis he led an expedition for the choice of a new landfill in order to test new missile technology for advanced military purpose. As the chief and organizer of the highly classified research missile and space weapons test range, Alpaidze was responsible for the development of ballistic and anti-ballistic rocket systems. Under his leadership, the Plesetsk Cosmodrome was constructed and extended, making it the largest Soviet test site and the busiest in the world. That area's launch facilities were to be the first to execute launches or react to preemptive strikes in case of sudden outbreak of war and thus were on constant alert status. Alpaidze had to be always at the ready to receive direct order for such action. Even though the silos were not constantly armed with nuclear warheads, primary targets in the US were maintained, such as Washington, D.C., New York City, Los Angeles and Chicago. From 1963 to 1975 Lieutenant General Alpaidze would personally supervise about 700 launches of missiles and spacecraft as head of the State Scientific Research Center until his retirement in 1975.

== Post-war ==
From 1975 to 1992 Alpaizde worked as deputy director and chief designer in the Moscow Institute of Heat Engineering, before he died in May 2006 at the age of 89. His body was interred at the Troyekurovskoye Cemetery.

== Honours and awards ==
- Hero of the Soviet Union (28 April 1945, No. 5434 Medal)
- USSR State Prize (1977)
- Order of Lenin (28 April 1945)
- Two Order of the Red Banner (1943 and 1944)
- Order of the Red Banner of Labour (1971)
- Order of Alexander Nevsky (1944)
- Order of the Patriotic War 1st class (1985)
- Four Order of the Red Star (1942, 1956, 1961, and 1975)
- campaign and jubilee medals, foreign orders and decorations

== Legacy ==
11824 Alpaidze, a main belt asteroid discovered by Soviet astronomer Lyudmila Chernykh in 1982, was named after Lieutenant-General Galaktion Alpaidze.
