= 1957 Angara =

Stony main-belt asteroid

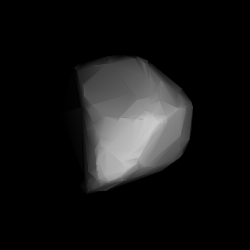
- Modelled shape of Angara from its lightcurve

Discovery
- Discovered by: L. Chernykh
- Discovery site: Crimean Astrophysical Obs.
- Discovery date: 1 April 1970

Designations
- Named after: Angara River (Siberian river)
- Alternative designations: 1970 GF · 1962 WG_{1} 1969 AA
- Minor planet category: main-belt · Eos

Orbital characteristics
- Epoch 4 September 2017 (JD 2458000.5)
- Uncertainty parameter 0
- Observation arc: 60.58 yr (22,126 days)
- Aphelion: 3.1828 AU
- Perihelion: 2.8338 AU
- Semi-major axis: 3.0083 AU
- Eccentricity: 0.0580
- Orbital period (sidereal): 5.22 yr (1,906 days)
- Mean anomaly: 345.36°
- Mean motion: 0° 11^{m} 20.04^{s} / day
- Inclination: 11.191°
- Longitude of ascending node: 50.702°
- Argument of perihelion: 209.03°

Physical characteristics
- Dimensions: 17.907±0.108 km 18.189±0.229 km 18.38 km (derived); 21.44±0.70 km 30.41±0.58 km
- Synodic rotation period: 3.67 h
- Geometric albedo: 0.055±0.006; 0.111±0.008; 0.14 (assumed); 0.1438±0.0310
- Spectral type: S B–V = 0.900; U–B = 0.380
- Absolute magnitude (H): 11.16±0.34 · 11.36 · 11.43

1957 Angara (prov. designation: 1970 GF) is a stony Eos asteroid from the outer regions of the asteroid belt, approximately 18 kilometers (11 miles) in diameter. It was discovered on 1 April 1970, by Soviet astronomer Lyudmila Chernykh at the Crimean Astrophysical Observatory in Nauchnyj, and named after the Siberian Angara River.

== Classification and orbit ==
Angara is a member of the Eos family, well known for mostly being of a silicaceous composition. It orbits the Sun in the outer main-belt at a distance of 2.8–3.2 AU once every 5 years and 3 months (1,906 days). Its orbit has an eccentricity of 0.06 and an inclination of 11° with respect to the ecliptic. A first precovery was taken at Goethe Link Observatory in 1956, extending the body's observation arc by 14 years prior to its official discovery observation at Nauchnyj.

== Naming ==
This minor planet was named for the over 1000-mile long Siberian Angara River that drains Lake Baikal. The official naming citation was published by the Minor Planet Center on 30 June 1977 (M.P.C. 4190).

== Physical characteristics ==
In December 1983, a rotational lightcurve of Angara was obtained from photometric observations by American astronomer Richard Binzel. Lightcurve analysis gave a well-define rotation period of 3.67 hours with a brightness amplitude of 0.52 magnitude, indicative of a non-spheroidal shape (U=3). Binzel also classified the body as a stony S-type asteroid.

According to the surveys carried out by the Japanese Akari satellite and NASA's Wide-field Infrared Survey Explorer with its subsequent NEOWISE mission, Angara measures between 17.907 and 30.41 kilometers in diameter and its surface has an albedo between 0.055 and 0.1438. The Collaborative Asteroid Lightcurve Link assumes a standard albedo for stony Eoan asteroids of 0.14 – taken from the family's largest member and namesake, 221 Eos – and derives a diameter of 18.38 kilometers with an absolute magnitude of 11.43.
