= 1796 Riga =

Main-belt asteroid

Discovery
- Discovered by: N. Chernykh
- Discovery site: Crimean Astrophysical Obs.
- Discovery date: 16 May 1966

Designations
- Named after: Riga (capital city)
- Alternative designations: 1966 KB · 1935 GE; 1941 FC_{1} · 1947 GA; 1950 TF_{2} · 1953 GW; 1960 JA · A907 TG; A907 UD
- Minor planet category: main-belt · (outer)

Orbital characteristics
- Epoch 4 September 2017 (JD 2458000.5)
- Uncertainty parameter 0
- Observation arc: 66.06 yr (24,129 days)
- Aphelion: 3.5474 AU
- Perihelion: 3.1668 AU
- Semi-major axis: 3.3571 AU
- Eccentricity: 0.0567
- Orbital period (sidereal): 6.15 yr (2,247 days)
- Mean anomaly: 142.11°
- Mean motion: 0° 9^{m} 36.72^{s} / day
- Inclination: 22.585°
- Longitude of ascending node: 186.73°
- Time of perihelion: 9 August 2027
- Argument of perihelion: 25.620°

Physical characteristics
- Dimensions: 66.2±6.6 km 68.089±1.037 km 68.167±0.298 km 71±7 km 73.83±1.8 km 85.79±1.57 km
- Synodic rotation period: 10.608±0.002 h (Note: Lightcurve plot of 1796 Riga, Palmer Divide Observatory, by B. D. Warner (2003), with a rotation period 10.608±0.002 hours and a brightness amplitude of 0.14±0.02 mag. Summary figures at Collaborative Asteroid Lightcurve Link (CALL)); 11.0±0.01 h 16 h 22.226±0.001 h
- Geometric albedo: 0.028±0.001; 0.0376±0.002; 0.04±0.01; 0.044±0.005; 0.0442±0.0082; 0.05±0.01
- Spectral type: XFCU (Tholen); Cb (SMASS); P · C B–V = 0.676; U–B = 0.289
- Apparent magnitude: 14.3 to 16.4
- Absolute magnitude (H): 9.59±0.40 · 9.84 (IRAS:12) · 9.84

1796 Riga, provisional designation 1966 KB, is a dark asteroid from the outer region of the asteroid belt, approximately 70 kilometers in diameter. It was discovered on 16 May 1966, by Russian astronomer Nikolai Chernykh at the Crimean Astrophysical Observatory in Nauchnyj, on the Crimean peninsula. It is named after the Latvian capital Riga. It came to opposition on 21 January 2026 at apparent magnitude 15.1 in the constellation of Monoceros.

== Orbit and classification ==
The asteroid orbits the Sun in the outer main-belt at a distance of 3.2–3.5 AU once every 6 years and 2 months (2,247 days). Its orbit has an eccentricity of 0.06 and an inclination of 23° with respect to the ecliptic. The body was first identified as "1907 TG" at the U.S Taunton Observatory (803) in 1907, and its first used precovery was taken at the Goethe Link Observatory in 1953, extending the asteroid's observation arc by 13 years prior to its official discovery observation. It is a member of the Cybele group of asteroids.

== Spectral type ==
The carbonaceous C-type asteroid is also classified as a very dark and featureless reddish P-type body by the NEOWISE survey of the Wide-field Infrared Survey Explorer (WISE). In the Tholen and SMASS taxonomy, it has a XFCU and Cb subtype, respectively.

== Diameter and albedo ==
According to the surveys carried out by the Infrared Astronomical Satellite IRAS, the Japanese Akari satellite and NASA's WISE/NEOWISE mission, the asteroid measures between 66.2 and 85.7 kilometers in diameter and its surface has an albedo between 0.028 and 0.05. The Collaborative Asteroid Lightcurve Link (CALL) agrees with the results obtained by IRAS, adopting a diameter of 73.83 kilometers with an albedo of 0.0376, based on an absolute magnitude of 9.84.

== Rotation period ==
Several rotational lightcurve for this asteroid were obtained from photometric observations since 1997. They gave a variety of rotation periods from 10.608 to 22.226 hours with inconsistent brightness variations in the range of 0.05 to 0.40 magnitude (U=2/2-/n.a./2). CALL adopts the results of the most observations made by astronomer Julian Oey at the Australian Blue Mountains Observatory (Q68) in March 2014, which gave a period of 22.226±0.001 hours and an amplitude of 0.40±0.05 magnitude (U=2).

== Naming ==
The minor planet was named after Riga, the capital of Latvia and location of the Astronomical Observatory of the University of Latvia. The name was proposed by Matiss A. Dirikis, who was a member of the observatory at the Latvian State University, and after whom the asteroid 1805 Dirikis is named. The official naming citation was published by the Minor Planet Center on 25 September 1971 (M.P.C. 3185).
