= 10001 Palermo =

Main-belt asteroid

Discovery
- Discovered by: L. Chernykh
- Discovery site: Crimean Astrophysical Obs.
- Discovery date: 8 October 1969

Designations
- Named after: Palermo (Italian city)
- Alternative designations: 1969 TM_{1} · 1991 RS_{27}
- Minor planet category: main-belt · (inner); Vestian

Orbital characteristics
- Epoch 23 March 2018 (JD 2458200.5)
- Uncertainty parameter 0
- Observation arc: 63.50 yr (23,192 d)
- Aphelion: 2.6955 AU
- Perihelion: 2.0579 AU
- Semi-major axis: 2.3767 AU
- Eccentricity: 0.1341
- Orbital period (sidereal): 3.66 yr (1,338 d)
- Mean anomaly: 66.907°
- Mean motion: 0° 16^{m} 8.4^{s} / day
- Inclination: 7.4247°
- Longitude of ascending node: 40.160°
- Argument of perihelion: 357.81°

Physical characteristics
- Mean diameter: 4.123±0.657 km 4.31 km (calculated)
- Synodic rotation period: 213.368±2.0136 h
- Geometric albedo: 0.20 (assumed); 0.341±0.134
- Spectral type: S (assumed)
- Absolute magnitude (H): 13.71±0.42; 13.745±0.006 (R); 13.80 · 13.9 · 14.19

10001 Palermo, provisional designation 1969 TM_{1}, is a Vestian asteroid and a slow rotator from the inner regions of the asteroid belt, approximately 4 kilometers (2.5 miles) in diameter. It was discovered on 8 October 1969, by Soviet–Russian astronomer Lyudmila Chernykh using a 0.4-meter double astrograph at the Crimean Astrophysical Observatory in Nauchnij on the Crimean peninsula. The asteroid is likely elongated in shape and has a long rotation period of 213 hours. It was named for the Italian city of Palermo to commemorate the discovery of Ceres two hundred years earlier.

== Orbit and classification ==
Orbit of Palermo (blue), the inner planets and Jupiter

Palermo is a member of the Vesta family (401). Vestian asteroids have a composition akin to cumulate eucrites. They are thought to have originated deep within 4 Vesta's crust – the family's parent body – possibly from the large Rheasilvia crater on its southern hemisphere near the South pole, formed as a result of a subcatastrophic collision. Vesta is also the asteroid belt's second-largest and second-most-massive body after Ceres.

It orbits the Sun in the inner asteroid belt at a distance of 2.1–2.7 AU once every 3 years and 8 months (1,338 days; semi-major axis of 2.38 AU). Its orbit has an eccentricity of 0.13 and an inclination of 7° with respect to the ecliptic. The body's observation arc begins with a precovery taken at the Palomar Observatory in July 1954, more than 12 years prior to its official discovery observation at Nauchnij.

== Physical characteristics ==
Palermo is an assumed S-type, while the overall spectral type for members of the Vesta family is that of a V-type.

=== Slow rotator ===
In September 2013, a rotational lightcurve of Palermo was obtained from photometric observations in the R-band by astronomers at the Palomar Transient Factory in California. Lightcurve analysis gave an exceptionally long rotation period of 213.368 hours with a high brightness amplitude of 0.97 magnitude, indicative for an elongated shape (U=2).

Palermo is a slow rotator as most asteroids have periods shorter than 20 hours. There are more than 600 known slow rotators with a spin rate of more than 100 hours.

=== Diameter and albedo ===
According to the survey carried out by the NEOWISE mission of NASA's Wide-field Infrared Survey Explorer, Palermo measures 4.12 kilometers in diameter and its surface has a high albedo of 0.34. The Collaborative Asteroid Lightcurve Link assumes a standard albedo for stony asteroids of 0.20 and calculates a diameter of 4.31 kilometers based on an absolute magnitude of 14.19.

== Naming ==
This minor planet was named after the Italian city of Palermo, capital of Sicily and location of the Palermo Observatory, where the dwarf planet and first asteroid Ceres was discovered by Giuseppe Piazzi on 1 January 1801. The official naming citation was published by the Minor Planet Center on the 200th anniversary of that discovery on 9 January 2001 (M.P.C. 41937).
