= 2127 Tanya =

Main-belt asteroid

Discovery
- Discovered by: L. Chernykh
- Discovery site: Crimean Astrophysical Obs.
- Discovery date: 29 May 1971

Designations
- Named after: Tanya Savicheva (Russian child diarist)
- Alternative designations: 1971 KB_{1} · 1953 GH_{1}
- Minor planet category: main-belt · (outer)

Orbital characteristics
- Epoch 4 September 2017 (JD 2458000.5)
- Uncertainty parameter 0
- Observation arc: 64.14 yr (23,428 days)
- Aphelion: 3.3125 AU
- Perihelion: 3.1076 AU
- Semi-major axis: 3.2100 AU
- Eccentricity: 0.0319
- Orbital period (sidereal): 5.75 yr (2,101 days)
- Mean anomaly: 343.14°
- Mean motion: 0° 10^{m} 17.04^{s} / day
- Inclination: 13.094°
- Longitude of ascending node: 106.39°
- Argument of perihelion: 185.54°

Physical characteristics
- Dimensions: 30.18 km (calculated); 37.736±0.197 km 40.111±0.397 km 41.19±1.05 km 41.43±9.46 km 43.89±16.43 km
- Synodic rotation period: 7.864±0.0211 h
- Geometric albedo: 0.03±0.06; 0.04±0.03; 0.0437±0.0049; 0.048±0.007; 0.055±0.003; 0.057 (assumed)
- Spectral type: C
- Absolute magnitude (H): 10.70 · 10.70±0.83 · 10.879±0.002 (R) · 10.90 · 11.0 · 11.1 · 11.15 · 11.33

2127 Tanya, provisional designation 1971 KB_{1}, is a carbonaceous asteroid from the outer region of the asteroid belt, approximately 40 kilometers in diameter. It was discovered on 29 May 1971, by Russian astronomer Lyudmila Chernykh at the Crimean Astrophysical Observatory in Nauchnij, on the Crimean peninsula. It was named in memory of Tanya Savicheva, a Russian child diarist during World War II.

== Orbit ==
Tanya is a carbonaceous C-type asteroid, that orbits the Sun in the outer main-belt at a distance of 3.1–3.3 AU once every 5 years and 9 months (2,101 days). Its orbit has an eccentricity of 0.03 and an inclination of 13° with respect to the ecliptic. It was first identified as 1953 GH_{1} at Goethe Link Observatory in 1953, extending the body's observation arc by 18 years prior to its official discovery at Nauchnij.

== Lightcurve ==
In October 2013, a rotational lightcurve of Tanya was obtained from photometric observations at the Palomar Transient Factory in California. Lightcurve analysis gave a rotation period of 7.8640 hours with a brightness variation of 0.18 magnitude (U=2).

== Diameter and albedo ==
According to the surveys carried out by the Infrared Astronomical Satellite IRAS, the Japanese Akari satellite, and NASA's Wide-field Infrared Survey Explorer with its subsequent NEOWISE mission, Tanya measures between 37.736 and 43.89 kilometers in diameter, and its surface has a low albedo between 0.03 and 0.055. The Collaborative Asteroid Lightcurve Link assumes a standard albedo for carbonaceous asteroids of 0.057 and calculates a much smaller diameter of 30.18 kilometers based on an absolute magnitude of 11.33.

== Naming ==
This minor planet was named by the discover for the memory of the young Russian girl Tanya Savicheva (1930–1944), who died after the Siege of Leningrad (1941–1944) on the Eastern Front during World War II. She wrote a well-known diary, describing the death of her parents and other relatives. The approved naming citation was published by the Minor Planet Center on 1 April 1980 (M.P.C. 5283).
