= 2031 BAM =

Asteroid

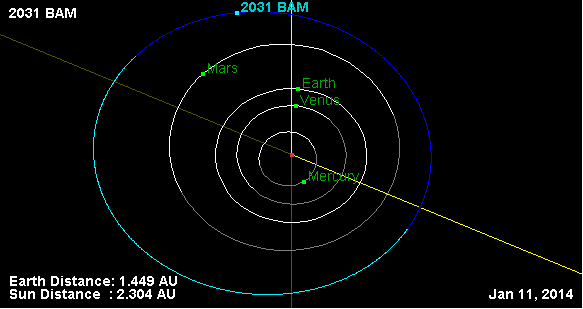
- Orbital diagram of BAM

Discovery
- Discovered by: L. Chernykh
- Discovery site: Crimean Astrophysical Obs.
- Discovery date: 8 October 1969

Designations
- Named after: Baikal–Amur Mainline (Siberian railway line)
- Alternative designations: 1969 TG_{2} · 1939 VB; 1959 TW · 1972 NQ
- Minor planet category: main-belt · (inner); Flora

Orbital characteristics
- Epoch 4 September 2017 (JD 2458000.5)
- Uncertainty parameter 0
- Observation arc: 77.39 yr (28,268 days)
- Aphelion: 2.6203 AU
- Perihelion: 1.8477 AU
- Semi-major axis: 2.2340 AU
- Eccentricity: 0.1729
- Orbital period (sidereal): 3.34 yr (1,220 days)
- Mean anomaly: 124.02°
- Mean motion: 0° 17^{m} 42.72^{s} / day
- Inclination: 4.7524°
- Longitude of ascending node: 169.28°
- Argument of perihelion: 213.58°

Physical characteristics
- Dimensions: 7.14 km (calculated); 8.14±0.36 km
- Synodic rotation period: 10.774±0.004 h
- Geometric albedo: 0.170±0.017; 0.24 (assumed)
- Spectral type: S
- Absolute magnitude (H): 12.9 · 13.00 · 13.05±0.81

2031 BAM, provisional designation 1969 TG_{2}, is a stony Florian asteroid from the inner regions of the asteroid belt, approximately 8 kilometers in diameter. It was discovered on 8 October 1969, by Soviet astronomer Lyudmila Chernykh at the Crimean Astrophysical Observatory in Nauchnyj, on the Crimean peninsula. The asteroid was named for those who built the Baikal–Amur Mainline (BAM; БАМ), a Siberian railway line.

== Orbit and classification ==
BAM is a member of the Flora family (402), a giant asteroid family and the largest family of stony asteroids in the main belt. It orbits the Sun in the inner asteroid belt at a distance of 1.8–2.6 AU once every 3 years and 4 months (1,220 days; semi-major axis of 2.23 AU). Its orbit has an eccentricity of 0.17 and an inclination of 5° with respect to the ecliptic.

The body's observation arc begins with its identification as 1939 VB at Uccle Observatory in November 1939, almost 30 years prior to its official discovery observation at Nauchnyj.

== Physical characteristics ==
BAM has been characterized as a stony S-type asteroid by Pan-STARRS photometric survey.

=== Rotation period ===
In October 2016, a rotational lightcurve of BAM was obtained from photometric observations by amateur astronomer Matthieu Conjat. Lightcurve analysis gave a well-defined rotation period of 10.774 hours with a brightness amplitude of 0.15 magnitude (U=3).

=== Diameter and albedo ===
According to the survey carried out by the Japanese Akari satellite, BAM measures 8.14 kilometers in diameter and its surface has an albedo of 0.170. The Collaborative Asteroid Lightcurve Link assumes a standard albedo of 0.24 – derived from 8 Flora, the parent body of the Flora family – and calculates a diameter of 7.14 kilometers based on an absolute magnitude of 12.9.

== Naming ==
This minor planet was named after those who constructed the Baikal–Amur Mainline (BAM; БАМ) through eastern Russia from 1974 to 1986. The rail line opened in 1989, and runs between Ust-Kut (near Lake Baikal and Komsomolsk-on-Amur. The official naming citation was published by the Minor Planet Center on 1 September 1978 (M.P.C. 4482).
