= 1956 Artek =

Dark main-belt asteroid

Discovery
- Discovered by: L. Chernykh
- Discovery site: Crimean Astrophysical Obs.
- Discovery date: 8 October 1969

Designations
- Named after: Artek (Арте́к) (Young Pioneer camp)
- Alternative designations: 1969 TX_{1} · 1975 TA_{6}
- Minor planet category: main-belt · Themis

Orbital characteristics
- Epoch 4 September 2017 (JD 2458000.5)
- Uncertainty parameter 0
- Observation arc: 63.16 yr (23,069 days)
- Aphelion: 3.5304 AU
- Perihelion: 2.8760 AU
- Semi-major axis: 3.2032 AU
- Eccentricity: 0.1022
- Orbital period (sidereal): 5.73 yr (2,094 days)
- Mean anomaly: 11.877°
- Mean motion: 0° 10^{m} 18.84^{s} / day
- Inclination: 1.4928°
- Longitude of ascending node: 153.36°
- Argument of perihelion: 346.60°

Physical characteristics
- Dimensions: 17.97±0.91 km 18.71 km (calculated); 19.92±3.55 km
- Synodic rotation period: 9.4±0.2 h
- Geometric albedo: 0.074±0.033; 0.08 (assumed); 0.099±0.011
- Spectral type: C
- Absolute magnitude (H): 11.90 · 11.95 · 12.08±0.41 · 12.1

1956 Artek, provisional designation 1969 TX_{1}, is a dark Themistian asteroid from the outer regions of the asteroid belt, approximately 19 kilometers in diameter. It was discovered on 8 October 1969, by Soviet–Russian astronomer Lyudmila Chernykh at the Crimean Astrophysical Observatory in Nauchnyj. It was named after Artek, a Soviet Young Pioneer camp.

== Orbit and classification ==
Artek is a dark C-type asteroid and a member of the Themis family, a dynamical family of outer-belt asteroids with nearly coplanar ecliptical orbits. It orbits the Sun in the outer main-belt at a distance of 2.9–3.5 AU once every 5 years and 9 months (2,094 days). Its orbit has an eccentricity of 0.10 and an inclination of 1° with respect to the ecliptic. The first precovery was taken at Goethe Link Observatory in 1954, extending the asteroid's observation arc by 15 years prior to its discovery.

== Physical characteristics ==
A rotational lightcurve was obtained from photometric observations made by Italian astronomers Roberto Crippa and Federico Manzini in February 2006. The fragmentary lightcurve gave a rotation period of 9.4±0.2 hours with a low brightness variation of 0.07 magnitude (U=1+).

According to the space-based surveys carried out by the Japanese Akari satellite and NASA's Wide-field Infrared Survey Explorer, the asteroid measures 18.0 and 19.2 kilometers in diameter with a corresponding albedo of 0.099 of 0.074, respectively. The Collaborative Asteroid Lightcurve Link assumes an albedo of 0.08 and calculates a diameter of 18.7 kilometers with an absolute magnitude of 12.1.

== Naming ==
This minor planet was named after the Soviet Artek (Арте́к) camp, the first All-Union Young Pioneer camp on the Crimean peninsula. The official naming citation was published by the Minor Planet Center on 30 June 1977 (M.P.C. 4190).
