= 1771 Makover =

Main-belt asteroid

Discovery
- Discovered by: L. Chernykh
- Discovery site: Crimean Astrophysical Obs.
- Discovery date: 24 January 1968

Designations
- Named after: Samuel Makover (astronomer)
- Alternative designations: 1968 BD · 1937 LM; 1938 QJ · 1941 FH; 1950 XW · 1952 FU; 1958 HF · 1961 XV; 1966 UC
- Minor planet category: main-belt · (outer)

Orbital characteristics
- Epoch 4 September 2017 (JD 2458000.5)
- Uncertainty parameter 0
- Observation arc: 78.58 yr (28,700 days)
- Aphelion: 3.6697 AU
- Perihelion: 2.5742 AU
- Semi-major axis: 3.1219 AU
- Eccentricity: 0.1755
- Orbital period (sidereal): 5.52 yr (2,015 days)
- Mean anomaly: 59.003°
- Mean motion: 0° 10^{m} 43.32^{s} / day
- Inclination: 11.249°
- Longitude of ascending node: 86.335°
- Argument of perihelion: 316.67°

Physical characteristics
- Dimensions: 46.886±0.293 km 51.202±0.294 km 56.59 km (derived); 63.59±19.06 km
- Synodic rotation period: 11.26±0.01 h
- Geometric albedo: 0.025±0.019; 0.0382 (derived); 0.0614±0.0097; 0.072±0.008
- Spectral type: C
- Absolute magnitude (H): 10.1 · 10.4 · 10.59 · 10.60±0.27

1771 Makover, provisional designation 1968 BD, is a carbonaceous asteroid from the outer region of the asteroid belt, approximately 50 kilometers in diameter.

It was discovered on 24 January 1968, by Russian astronomer Lyudmila Chernykh at the Crimean Astrophysical Observatory in Nauchnyj on the Crimean peninsula. It was named after Russian astronomer Samuel Makover.

== Orbit and classification ==
The dark C-type asteroid orbits the Sun in the outer main-belt at a distance of 2.6–3.7 AU once every 5 years and 6 months (2,015 days). Its orbit has an eccentricity of 0.18 and an inclination of 11° with respect to the ecliptic. At Johannesburg Observatory, Makover was first identified as 1937 LM in 1937. Its first used observation was made at the same observatory one year later, when it was identified as 1938 QJ, extending the body's observation arc by 30 years prior to its official discovery observation.

== Physical characteristics ==
In December 2011, a rotational lightcurve of Makover was obtained by astronomer Andrea Ferrero from photometric observation. It gave a well-defined rotation period of 11.26 hours with a brightness variation of 0.25 magnitude (U=3).

According to the survey carried out by NASA's Wide-field Infrared Survey Explorer with its subsequent NEOWISE mission, Makover measures between 46.89 and 63.59 kilometers in diameter, and its surface has an albedo between 0.025 and 0.072. The Collaborative Asteroid Lightcurve Link derives an albedo of 0.0382 and a diameter of 56.59 kilometers with an absolute magnitude of 10.4.

== Naming ==
This minor planet was named in honor of Russian astronomer Samuel Gdalevich Makover (1908–1970), who studied extensively the orbit of Encke's Comet (referred to as Comet Encke-Backlund in Russia), and pioneered in the use of electronic calculators for computing planetary perturbations and orbit improvements. He was head of the Institute of Theoretical Astrophysics's (ITA) department of minor planets and comets, and editor of the annual volume of Minor Planet Ephemerides. He was also a vice-president of IAU's commission 20, Positions & Motions of Minor Planets, Comets & Satellites, in the 1960s. The official naming citation was published by the Minor Planet Center on 25 September 1971 (M.P.C. 3185).
