= 3963 Paradzhanov =

Main-belt asteroid

Discovery
- Discovered by: L. Chernykh
- Discovery site: Crimean Astrophysical Obs.
- Discovery date: 8 October 1969

Designations
- Named after: Sergei Parajanov (Soviet film director)
- Alternative designations: 1969 TP_{2} · 1979 HS_{3} 1984 QR_{1}
- Minor planet category: main-belt · (inner); Nysa–Polana complex

Orbital characteristics
- Epoch 4 September 2017 (JD 2458000.5)
- Uncertainty parameter 0
- Observation arc: 47.56 yr (17,373 days)
- Aphelion: 2.9198 AU
- Perihelion: 1.9608 AU
- Semi-major axis: 2.4403 AU
- Eccentricity: 0.1965
- Orbital period (sidereal): 3.81 yr (1,392 days)
- Mean anomaly: 197.62°
- Mean motion: 0° 15^{m} 30.6^{s} / day
- Inclination: 3.2758°
- Longitude of ascending node: 109.71°
- Argument of perihelion: 285.99°

Physical characteristics
- Dimensions: 5.779±0.375 km
- Geometric albedo: 0.192±0.023
- Absolute magnitude (H): 13.5

3963 Paradzhanov, provisional designation 1969 TP_{2}, is an asteroid from the inner regions of the asteroid belt, approximately 6 kilometers in diameter. It was discovered on 8 October 1969, by astronomer Lyudmila Chernykh at the Crimean Astrophysical Observatory in Nauchnyj, on the Crimean peninsula. The asteroid was named after Soviet film director Sergei Parajanov (Sargis Paradzhanov) in 1996.

== Orbit and classification ==
Paradzhanov is a member of the Nysa–Polana complex, a collection of overlapping asteroid families in the inner main-belt. Paradzhanov has a relatively high albedo (see below) which places it into the stony subgroup of the complex.

It orbits the Sun at a distance of 2.0–2.9 AU once every 3 years and 10 months (1,392 days). Its orbit has an eccentricity of 0.20 and an inclination of 3° with respect to the ecliptic. The body's observation arc begins with its identification as 1979 HS_{3} at the discovering observatory in Nauchnyj in March 1979, almost 10 years after its official discovery observation.

== Physical characteristics ==
=== Rotation period ===
As of 2017, no rotational lightcurve of Paradzhanov has been obtained from photometric observations. The asteroid's rotation period, poles and shape remain unknown.

=== Diameter and albedo ===
According to the survey carried out by the NEOWISE mission of NASA's Wide-field Infrared Survey Explorer, Paradzhanov measures 5.779 kilometers in diameter and its surface has an albedo of 0.192.

== Naming ==
This minor planet was named in memory of Georgian–Soviet film director Sergei Parajanov (1924–1990) (Sargis Paradzhanov). In 1965, he became internationally acknowledged with his feature film Shadows of Forgotten Ancestors, but also a target of the Soviet regime. The official naming citation was published by the Minor Planet Center on 3 May 1996 (M.P.C. 27126).
