= 5385 Kamenka =

Asteroid

Discovery
- Discovered by: L. Chernykh
- Discovery site: Crimean Astrophysical Obs.
- Discovery date: 3 October 1975

Designations
- Named after: Kamianka (Ukrainian town)
- Alternative designations: 1975 TS_{3} · 1975 UG; 1986 TY_{1}
- Minor planet category: main-belt · (outer) background

Orbital characteristics
- Epoch 23 March 2018 (JD 2458200.5)
- Uncertainty parameter 0
- Observation arc: 63.01 yr (23,016 d)
- Aphelion: 3.8787 AU
- Perihelion: 2.4352 AU
- Semi-major axis: 3.1570 AU
- Eccentricity: 0.2286
- Orbital period (sidereal): 5.61 yr (2,049 d)
- Mean anomaly: 253.72°
- Mean motion: 0° 10^{m} 32.52^{s} / day
- Inclination: 9.7974°
- Longitude of ascending node: 41.394°
- Argument of perihelion: 301.79°

Physical characteristics
- Mean diameter: 14.10±3.89 km 15.38±4.01 km 16.768±0.317 km 20.21 km (calculated)
- Synodic rotation period: 5.93±0.04 h 6.683±0.008 h
- Geometric albedo: 0.057 (assumed); 0.0828±0.0192; 0.083±0.019; 0.11±0.06; 0.11±0.11
- Spectral type: C (assumed)
- Absolute magnitude (H): 12.20; 12.24±0.11 (R); 12.52; 12.59±0.27

5385 Kamenka, provisional designation 1975 TS_{3}, is a background asteroid from the outer regions of the asteroid belt, approximately 16 kilometers (10 miles) in diameter. It was discovered on 3 October 1975, by Soviet astronomer Lyudmila Chernykh at the Crimean Astrophysical Observatory in Nauchnij, on the Crimean peninsula. The presumed C-type asteroid has a rotation period of 6.68 hours. It was named for the Ukrainian town of Kamianka.

== Orbit and classification ==
Kamenka is a non-family asteroid from the main belt's background population. It orbits the Sun in the outer asteroid belt at a distance of 2.4–3.9 AU once every 5 years and 7 months (2,049 days; semi-major axis of 3.16 AU). Its orbit has an eccentricity of 0.23 and an inclination of 10° with respect to the ecliptic. The body's observation arc begins with a precovery taken at Palomar Observatory in March 1955, twenty years prior to its official discovery observation at Nauchnij.

== Physical characteristics ==
Kamenka is an assumed carbonaceous C-type asteroid.

=== Rotation period ===
Two rotational lightcurves of Kamenka have been obtained from photometric observations at the Palomar Transient Factory and at the Oakley Southern Sky and Oakley Observatory. Lightcurve analysis gave a rotation period of 5.93 and 6.683 hours with a brightness amplitude of 0.26 and 0.15 magnitude, respectively (U=2/2).

=== Diameter and albedo ===
According to the survey carried out by the NEOWISE mission of NASA's Wide-field Infrared Survey Explorer, Kamenka measures between 14.10 and 16.768 kilometers in diameter and its surface has an albedo between 0.083 and 0.11.

The Collaborative Asteroid Lightcurve Link assumes a standard albedo for a carbonaceous asteroid of 0.057 and calculates a diameter of 20.21 kilometers based on an absolute magnitude of 12.2.

== Naming ==
This minor planet was named after the town of Kamianka (Ukrainian: Кам'янка; Russian: Камeнка), located in the Cherkasy Oblast region of central Ukraine. The official naming citation was published by the Minor Planet Center on 24 January 2000 (M.P.C. 38194).
