= 867 Kovacia =

Elongated main-belt asteroid

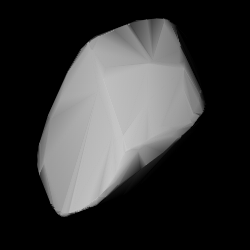
- Modelled shape of Kovacia from its lightcurve

Discovery
- Discovered by: J. Palisa
- Discovery site: Vienna Obs.
- Discovery date: 25 February 1917

Designations
- Named after: Friedrich Kovacs (Austrian physician)
- Alternative designations: A917 DH · 1942 XF; 1958 WA · 1917 BS
- Minor planet category: main-belt · (outer); Hygiea · BG

Orbital characteristics
- Epoch 31 May 2020 (JD 2459000.5)
- Uncertainty parameter 0
- Observation arc: 102.93 yr (37,594 d)
- Aphelion: 3.4574 AU
- Perihelion: 2.6751 AU
- Semi-major axis: 3.0663 AU
- Eccentricity: 0.1276
- Orbital period (sidereal): 5.37 yr (1,961 d)
- Mean anomaly: 113.77°
- Mean motion: 0° 11^{m} 0.96^{s} / day
- Inclination: 5.9738°
- Longitude of ascending node: 46.820°
- Argument of perihelion: 70.135°

Physical characteristics
- Mean diameter: 24.04±2.2 km; 24.113±0.439 km; 25.02±0.63 km
- Mean density: 1.4 g/cm^{3} (est.)
- Synodic rotation period: 8.6772±0.0001 h
- Pole ecliptic latitude: (200.0°, −44.0°) (λ_{1}/β_{1}); (38.0°, −50.0°) (λ_{2}/β_{2})
- Geometric albedo: 0.088±0.005; 0.092±0.023; 0.0923±0.019
- Spectral type: C (SDSS-MOC); B (Mothe-Diniz)
- Absolute magnitude (H): 11.5

867 Kovacia (prov. designation: A917 DH or 1917 BS) is an elongated, dark asteroid and member of the Hygiea family from the outer regions of the asteroid belt. It was discovered on 25 February 1917, by astronomer Johann Palisa at the Vienna Observatory in Austria. The carbonaceous C/B-type asteroid has a rotation period of 8.7 hours and measures approximately 24 kilometers (15 miles) in diameter. It was named after Austrian physician Friedrich Kovacs (1861–1931).

== Orbit and classification ==
According to Zappalà's classification of dynamical families, and when applying the synthetic hierarchical clustering method (HCM) by Nesvorný, Kovacia is a member of the Hygiea family (601), a very large family of carbonaceous outer-belt asteroids, named after 10 Hygiea, which is the main belt's fourth-largest asteroid. However, it is a non-family background asteroid according to another HCM-analysis by Milani and Knežević (AstDys).

It orbits the Sun in the outer asteroid belt at a distance of 2.7–3.5 AU once every 5 years and 4 months (1,961 days; semi-major axis of 3.07 AU). Its orbit has an eccentricity of 0.13 and an inclination of 6° with respect to the ecliptic. The body's observation arc begins at Vienna Observatory on 1 March 1917, or four nights after its official discovery observation.

== Naming ==
This minor planet was named by Palisa after Friedrich Kovacs (1861–1931), a Vienna physician and internists, who successfully treated and restored the health of the discoverer's wife. The famed Viennese cardiologist also treated Gustav Mahler, who had a defective heart. Kovacs imposed a curtailment of all forms of vigorous exercise, a strict regimen of rest and even the usage of a pedometer to measure the composer's physical effort. These restrictions depressed Mahler and ultimately lead to the Symphony No. 9, his last completed work. The naming was also mentioned in The Names of the Minor Planets by Paul Herget in 1955 (H 85).

== Physical characteristics ==
In the SDSS-based taxonomy, Kovacia is a dark and common carbonaceous C-type asteroid, while in a spectroscopic study of the Hygiea family from 2001, this asteroid has been classified as a somewhat brighter B-type asteroid. The study finds a significant number of objects of this family to belong to this spectral type. Both C/B-types agree with the overall spectral type for the Hygiea family listed by Nesvorný (601).

=== Rotation period and poles ===
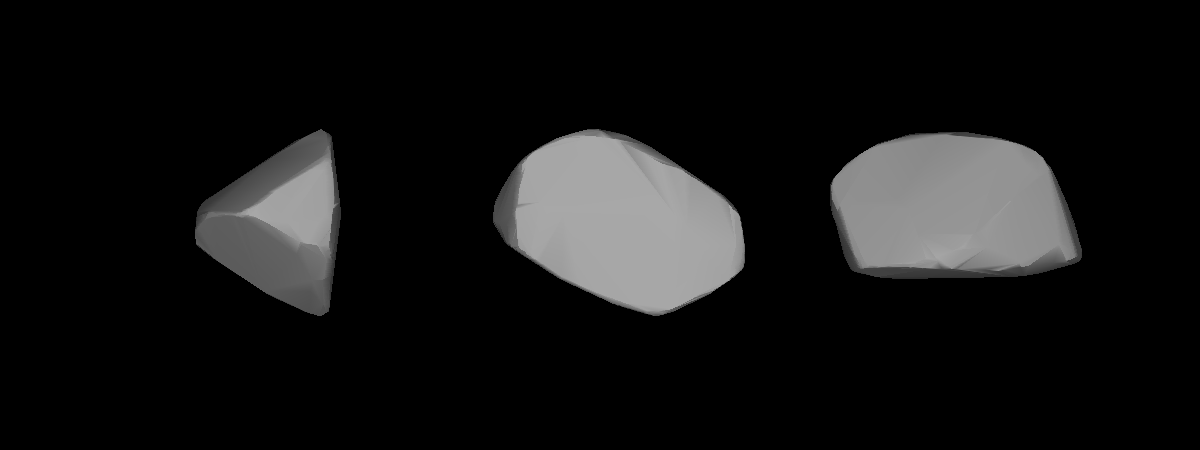
Lightcurve-based 3D-model of Kovacia

In February 2008, a rotational lightcurve of Kovacia was obtained from photometric observations by a collaboration of French and Italian amateur astronomers including René Roy, Silvano Casulli, François Colas, Arnaud Leroy, Federico Manzini, Christophe Demeautis and Jean-François Coliac. Lightcurve analysis gave a well-defined rotation period of 8.6772±0.0001 hours with a high brightness variation of 0.86±0.02 magnitude, indicative of a non-spherical, elongated shape (U=3). The result supersedes a previous observation by Roberto Crippa and Federico Manzini at the Sozzago Astronomical Station (A12) from November 2006, that determined a lower limit of 6 hours (U=1+). Due to observed mutual occultation and eclipsing events, the collaboration of astronomers strongly suspect Kovacia to be a binary asteroid with a satellite orbiting it every 31.9580±0.0005 days. However, no follow-up observations have been published. As of March 2020, this asteroid is neither listed at Johnston's Archive nor has it any kind of binary status in the Lightcurve Data Base.

In 2016, a modeled lightcurve gave a concurring sidereal period of 8.67807±0.00002 hours using data from the Uppsala Asteroid Photometric Catalogue, the Palomar Transient Factory survey, and individual observers (such as above), as well as sparse-in-time photometry from the NOFS, the Catalina Sky Survey, and the La Palma surveys (950). The study also determined two spin axes of (200.0°, −44.0°) and (38.0°, −50.0°) in ecliptic coordinates (λ, β).

=== Diameter and albedo ===
According to the surveys carried out by the Infrared Astronomical Satellite IRAS, the NEOWISE mission of NASA's Wide-field Infrared Survey Explorer (WISE), and the Japanese Akari satellite, Kovacia measures (24.04±2.2), (24.113±0.439) and (25.02±0.63) kilometers in diameter and its surface has an albedo of (0.0923±0.019), (0.092±0.023) and (0.088±0.005), respectively. The Collaborative Asteroid Lightcurve Link derives an albedo of 0.0772 and a diameter of 23.96 kilometers based on an absolute magnitude of 11.5. Alternative mean-diameter measurements published by the WISE team include (19.808±4.804 km) and (21.049±8.124 km) with corresponding albedos of (0.096±0.067) and (0.093±0.063).
