= 11824 Alpaidze =

Stony background asteroid from the middle region of the asteroid belt

Discovery
- Discovered by: L. Chernykh
- Discovery site: Crimean Astrophysical Obs.
- Discovery date: 16 September 1982

Designations
- Named after: Galaktion Alpaidze (Plesetsk Cosmodrome)
- Alternative designations: 1982 SO_{5} · 1978 WV_{1}
- Minor planet category: main-belt · (middle) background

Orbital characteristics
- Epoch 4 September 2017 (JD 2458000.5)
- Uncertainty parameter 0
- Observation arc: 37.98 yr (13,874 days)
- Aphelion: 3.4452 AU
- Perihelion: 1.8267 AU
- Semi-major axis: 2.6359 AU
- Eccentricity: 0.3070
- Orbital period (sidereal): 4.28 yr (1,563 days)
- Mean anomaly: 59.051°
- Mean motion: 0° 13^{m} 49.08^{s} / day
- Inclination: 1.7272°
- Longitude of ascending node: 1.3721°
- Argument of perihelion: 353.03°

Physical characteristics
- Mean diameter: 4.83 km (calculated)
- Synodic rotation period: 4.1146±0.0021 h 4.1157±0.0021 h
- Geometric albedo: 0.10 (assumed)
- Spectral type: S/C
- Absolute magnitude (H): 14.7 · 15.309±0.001 (S) · 14.692±0.001 (R)

11824 Alpaidze, provisional designation 1982 SO_{5}, is a stony background asteroid from the middle region of the asteroid belt, approximately 5 kilometers (3.1 miles) in diameter. It was discovered on 16 September 1982, by Russian astronomer Lyudmila Chernykh at the Crimean Astrophysical Observatory, Nauchnyj, on the Crimean peninsula. The asteroid was named for Soviet General Galaktion Alpaidze.

== Orbit and classification ==
Alpaidze is a non-family asteroid from the main belt's background population. It orbits the Sun in the central main-belt at a distance of 1.8–3.4 AU once every 4 years and 3 months (1,563 days). Its orbit has an eccentricity of 0.31 and an inclination of 2° with respect to the ecliptic. It was first identified as 1978 WV_{1} at Palomar Observatory in November 1978. The body's observation arc, however, begins with its official discovery observation.

== Naming ==
This minor planet was named after Georgian-born Soviet Lieutenant General Galaktion Alpaidze (1916–2006), Hero of the Soviet Union and laureate of the USSR State Prize. He was the head of the Plesetsk Cosmodrome in the 1960s and 1970s, where space crafts were tested. During his supervision, the Cosmodrome became the world's most active launch site in the world. The official naming citation was published by the Minor Planet Center on 2 April 2007 (M.P.C. 59385).

== Physical characteristics ==
=== Lightcurves ===
In September 2009, two rotational lightcurves of Alpaidze were obtained from photometric observations made by astronomers at the Palomar Transient Factory, California. The fragmentary lightcurves gave a rotation period of 4.1157 and 4.1146 hours with a brightness variation of 0.05 and 0.06 in magnitude, respectively (U=1/1).

=== Diameter and albedo ===
The Collaborative Asteroid Lightcurve Link assumes an albedo of 0.10 – a compromise value between the stony (0.20) and carbonaceous (0.057) albedos for unknown asteroids in the 2.6–2.7 AU region of the main-belt – and calculates a diameter of 4.8 kilometers with an absolute magnitude of 14.7.
