= 2296 Kugultinov =

Main-belt asteroid

Discovery
- Discovered by: L. Chernykh
- Discovery site: Crimean Astrophysical Obs.
- Discovery date: 18 January 1975

Designations
- Named after: David Kugultinov (Soviet poet)
- Alternative designations: 1975 BA_{1} · 1941 FM; 1958 DF · 1975 CE; 1978 RM_{1}
- Minor planet category: main-belt · Themis

Orbital characteristics
- Epoch 4 September 2017 (JD 2458000.5)
- Uncertainty parameter 0
- Observation arc: 75.44 yr (27,556 days)
- Aphelion: 3.7113 AU
- Perihelion: 2.6512 AU
- Semi-major axis: 3.1813 AU
- Eccentricity: 0.1666
- Orbital period (sidereal): 5.67 yr (2,073 days)
- Mean anomaly: 180.53°
- Mean motion: 0° 10^{m} 25.32^{s} / day
- Inclination: 1.2545°
- Longitude of ascending node: 42.238°
- Argument of perihelion: 100.14°

Physical characteristics
- Dimensions: 15.10±4.45 km 20.51 km (calculated); 21.07±1.77 km 21.566±0.067 km
- Synodic rotation period: 8.43±0.02 h 10 h 16.850±0.004 h
- Geometric albedo: 0.08 (assumed); 0.083±0.004; 0.120±0.021; 0.12±0.06
- Spectral type: C
- Absolute magnitude (H): 11.3 · 11.6 · 11.7 · 11.77±0.23 · 1.80 · 11.94

2296 Kugultinov, provisional designation 1975 BA_{1}, is a carbonaceous Themistian asteroid from the outer region of the asteroid belt, approximately 20 kilometers in diameter.

It was discovered on 18 January 1975, by Russian astronomer Lyudmila Chernykh at the Crimean Astrophysical Observatory on the Crimean peninsula in Nauchnyj, and named after Soviet poet David Nikitich Kugultinov.

== Classification and orbit ==
Kugultinov is a carbonaceous C-type asteroid and member of the Themis family, a dynamical family of outer-belt asteroids with nearly coplanar ecliptical orbits. It orbits the Sun in the outer main-belt at a distance of 2.7–3.7 AU once every 5 years and 8 months (2,073 days). Its orbit has an eccentricity of 0.17 and an inclination of 1° with respect to the ecliptic.

== Physical characteristics ==
=== Diameter and albedo ===
According to the surveys carried out by the NEOWISE mission of NASA's Wide-field Infrared Survey Explorer and the Japanese Akari satellite, Kugultinov measures between 15.10 and 21.566 kilometers in diameter and its surface has an albedo between 0.083 and 0.12. The Collaborative Asteroid Lightcurve Link (CALL) assumes an albedo of 0.08 and calculates a diameter of 20.51 kilometers based an absolute magnitude of 11.8.

=== Lightcurves ===
Three different rotational lightcurves of Kugultinov were obtain from photometric observations. The first, fragmentary lightcurve by Roberto Crippa and Federico Manzini in December 2013, gave a rotation period of 10 hours with a brightness variation of 0.03 magnitude (U=1). In April 2015, the result was superseded by observations made by Kim Lang at the Klokkerholm Observatory in Denmark, (Note: The minor planet 2296 Kugultinov was observed on 13 nights between 2015 March 13 and April 21. The analysis yielded a synodic period of rotation of P = 16.850 ± 0.004 h and amplitude of A = 0.23 mag. This result is in disagreement with a previously reported period of P = 10.41 h.) and by a team at the U.S. University of Maryland using the iTelescope network, (Note: Photometric observations of main-belt asteroid 2296 Kugultinov were made over a period of five nights spanning 2015 March 27 to April 20. The measured rotation period is 8.4332 ± 0.0224 h.) obtaining a period of 16.850 (U=2) and 8.4332±0.0224 hours (U=2+) with an amplitude of 0.23 and 0.19, respectively. CALL considers the shorter period solution the better result.

== Naming ==
This minor planet was named after David Nikitich Kugultinov (1922–2006), prominent Soviet poet and national poet of the Republic of Kalmykia (also see 2287 Kalmykia). The approved naming citation was published by the Minor Planet Center on 2 December 1990 (M.P.C. 17465).
