= List of named minor planets: O =

This is a partial list of named minor planets, containing all those starting with the letter O, as of 28 September 2026. It is ordered in a case-insensitive, alphabetical manner and contains a total of 527 entries. Grey minor planets have no article and redirect to the list of minor planets instead (see List of minor planets § Main index).

== O ==
- 4901 Ó Briain
- 21774 O'Brien
- 4927 O'Connell
- 8357 O'Connor
- 27239 O'Dorney
- 2351 O'Higgins
- 6585 O'Keefe
- 28592 O'Leary
- 3637 O'Meara
- 9524 O'Rourke
- 2525 O'Steen
- 3083 OAFA
- 342204 Oak Cliff
- 97786 Oauam
- 14217 Oaxaca
- 16563 Ob
- 34044 Obafial
- 21712 Obaid
- 261108 Obanhelian
- 187669 Obastromca
- 27740 Obatomoyuki
- 29402 Obélix
- 52334 Oberammergau
- 5489 Oberkochen
- 9236 Obermair
- 3275 Oberndorfer
- 96506 Oberösterreich
- 6293 Oberpfalz
- 9253 Oberth
- 250370 Obertocitterio
- 207763 Oberursel
- 6669 Obi
- 8471 Obrant
- 4623 Obraztsova
- 3128 Obruchev
- 99193 Obsfabra
- 11612 Obu
- 9914 Obukhova
- 15870 Obůrka
- 177120 Ocampo Uría
- 296587 Ocaña
- 23238 Ocasio-Cortez
- 6525 Ocastron
- 20081 Occhialini
- 12571 Occhiogrosso
- 5067 Occidental
- 224 Oceana
- 61404 Očenášek
- 6024 Ochanomizu
- 20574 Ochinero
- 117703 Ochoa
- 7343 Ockeghem
- 9496 Ockels
- 475 Ocllo
- 598 Octavia
- 7052 Octaviabutler
- 58498 Octaviopaz
- 1144 Oda
- 9435 Odafukashi
- 8952 ODAS
- 17865 Odden
- 105613 Odedaharonson
- 156939 Odegard
- 34786 Odeh
- 25234 Odell
- 10948 Odenwald
- 2606 Odessa
- 108072 Odifreddi
- 3989 Odin
- 2775 Odishaw
- 552708 Ödmangovender
- 12749 Odokaigan
- 4637 Odorico
- 248717 Ódryárpád
- 1143 Odysseus
- 9713 Oeax
- 23995 Oechsle
- 8602 Oedicnemus
- 8959 Oenanthe
- 164585 Oenomaos
- 215 Oenone
- 16583 Oersted
- 16167 Oertli
- 9825 Oetken
- 19676 Ofeliaguilar
- 10820 Offenbach
- 175259 Offenberger
- 7639 Offutt
- 17051 Oflynn
- 63897 Ofunato
- 5158 Ogarev
- 10169 Ogasawara
- 12221 Ogatakoan
- 6389 Ogawa
- 120735 Ogawakiyoshi
- 14315 Ogawamachi
- 23980 Ogden
- 28127 Ogden-Stenerson
- 14116 Ogea
- 7476 Ogilsbie
- 3973 Ogilvie
- 4013 Ogiria
- 7955 Ogiwara
- 189011 Ogmios
- 34466 Ognicholls
- 14998 Ogosemachi
- 33056 Ogunimachi
- 31105 Oguniyamagata
- 11817 Oguri
- 1259 Ógyalla
- 32919 Ohashi
- 4675 Ohboke
- 5970 Ohdohrikouen
- 439 Ohio
- 65716 Ohkinohama
- 7898 Ohkuma
- 24750 Ohm
- 15469 Ohmura
- 9062 Ohnishi
- 8909 Ohnishitaka
- 5180 Ohno
- 4801 Ohře
- 61189 Ohsadaharu
- 3626 Ohsaki
- 12479 Ohshimaosamu
- 8912 Ohshimatake
- 8733 Ohsugi
- 24673 Ohsugitadao
- 5868 Ohta
- 2960 Ohtaki
- 10138 Ohtanihiroshi
- 13640 Ohtateruaki
- 7526 Ohtsuka
- 14922 Ohyama
- 110293 Oia
- 192220 Oicles
- 2667 Oikawa
- 9907 Oileus
- 58096 Oineus
- 31087 Oirase
- 3843 OISCA
- 3379 Oishi
- 42516 Oistrach
- 16407 Oiunskij
- 4458 Oizumi
- 5080 Oja
- 3565 Ojima
- 21054 Ojmjakon
- 16494 Oka
- 6737 Okabayashi
- 22951 Okabekazuko
- 8416 Okada
- 9650 Okadaira
- 4156 Okadanoboru
- 23742 Okadatatsuaki
- 43753 Okadayoshirou
- 15316 Okagakimachi
- 6244 Okamoto
- 4505 Okamura
- 9845 Okamuraosamu
- 12439 Okasaki
- 30184 Okasinski
- 36782 Okauchitakashige
- 1701 Okavango
- 2084 Okayama
- 8188 Okegaya
- 149831 Okeke
- 46563 Oken
- 4042 Okhotsk
- 8062 Okhotsymskij
- 377144 Okietex
- 8428 Okiko
- 10916 Okina-Ouna
- 13188 Okinawa
- 30888 Okitsumisaki
- 13688 Oklahoma
- 379732 Oklay
- 6838 Okuda
- 23775 Okudaira
- 8851 Okudamasataka
- 8099 Okudoiyoshimi
- 3149 Okudzhava
- 5174 Okugi
- 12810 Okumiomote
- 10990 Okunev
- 7769 Okuni
- 11288 Okunohosomichi
- 11959 Okunokeno
- 571535 Okunoto
- 5125 Okushiri
- 5142 Okutama
- 52872 Okyrhoe
- 7242 Okyudo
- 24637 Olʹgusha
- 445917 Ola
- 554648 Olaffischer
- 44479 Oláheszter
- 541776 Oláhkatalin
- 11935 Olakarlsson
- 18984 Olathe
- 2454 Olaus Magnus
- 8869 Olausgutho
- 1002 Olbersia
- 75970 Olcott
- 10515 Old Joe
- 20562 Oldag
- 5656 Oldfield
- 43501 Oldroyd
- 333050 Olds
- 2897 Ole Römer
- 9242 Olea
- 7726 Olegbykov
- 19127 Olegefremov
- 3501 Olegiya
- 15702 Olegkotov
- 278200 Olegpopov
- 542084 Olegverkhodanov
- 305287 Olegyankov
- 17700 Oleksiygolubov
- 604468 Olenici
- 2438 Oleshko
- 217420 Olevsk
- 251449 Olexakorolʹ
- 26505 Olextokarev
- 9034 Oleyuria
- 304 Olga
- 21661 Olgagermani
- 207695 Olgakopyl
- 407041 Olganevskaya
- 16402 Olgapopova
- 17167 Olgarozanova
- 9684 Olieslagers
- 14972 Olihainaut
- 12138 Olinwilson
- 118769 Olivas
- 33452 Olivebryan
- 102234 Olivebyrne
- 2177 Oliver
- 28711 Oliverburnett
- 44216 Olivercabasa
- 12166 Oliverherrmann
- 34198 Oliverleitner
- 10716 Olivermorton
- 28623 Olivermoses
- 12167 Olivermüller
- 20563 Oliverprice
- 84928 Oliversacks
- 129114 Oliverwalthall
- 201019 Oliverwhite
- 835 Olivia
- 164676 Oliviabaraldi
- 129082 Oliviabillett
- 24129 Oliviahu
- 27593 Oliviamarie
- 281007 Oliviaperrotto
- 25801 Oliviaschwob
- 59162 Olivierbienaymé
- 20565 Oliviermousis
- 2201 Oljato
- 10465 Olkin
- 5608 Olmos
- 3287 Olmstead
- 8697 Olofsson
- 30564 Olomouc
- 5209 Oloosson
- 13411 OLRAP
- 2310 Olshaniya
- 5166 Olson
- 582 Olympia
- 1022 Olympiada
- 22754 Olympus
- 221566 Omarcustodio
- 3095 Omarkhayyam
- 34544 Omarsanreyes
- 24517 Omattage
- 241153 Omegagigia
- 142091 Omerblaes
- 28983 Omergranek
- 33624 Omersiddiqui
- 37764 Omirika
- 24640 Omiwa
- 688117 Omizzolo
- 35295 Omo
- 9375 Omodaka
- 6971 Omogokei
- 187531 Omorichugakkou
- 3406 Omsk
- 353409 Onaka
- 6569 Ondaatje
- 16817 Onderlička
- 7204 Ondřejov
- 16273 Oneill
- 289992 Onfray
- 763488 Oniciuc
- 10849 Onigiri
- 48433 Onishi
- 6987 Onioshidashi
- 4353 Onizaki
- 3355 Onizuka
- 31918 Onkargujral
- 12868 Onken
- 5294 Onnetoh
- 1389 Onnie
- 31581 Onnink
- 7678 Onoda
- 8939 Onodajunjiro
- 10163 Onomichi
- 9599 Onotomoko
- 2330 Ontake
- 12800 Oobayashiarata
- 11151 Oodaigahara
- 8533 Oohira
- 10627 Ookuninushi
- 11152 Oomine
- 2649 Oongaq
- 1691 Oort
- 1738 Oosterhoff
- 27882 Ootanihideji
- 23744 Ootsubo
- 8278 Ooyanagi
- 5214 Oozora
- 90732 Opdebeeck
- 10692 Opeil
- 5055 Opekushin
- 69423 Openuni
- 52767 Ophelestes
- 171 Ophelia
- 20729 Opheltius
- 2099 Öpik
- 221917 Opites
- 39167 Opitom
- 136518 Opitz
- 255 Oppavia
- 343981 Oppenheim
- 67085 Oppenheimer
- 1492 Oppolzer
- 39382 Opportunity
- 555152 Oproiu
- 2736 Ops
- 1195 Orangia
- 58095 Oranienstein
- 12151 Oranje-Nassau
- 127516 Oravetz
- 11361 Orbinskij
- 291849 Orchestralondon
- 1080 Orchis
- 48471 Orchiston
- 90482 Orcus
- 33437 Ordenovic
- 2406 Orelskaya
- 22932 Orenbrecher
- 27709 Orenburg
- 8982 Oreshek
- 12576 Oresme
- 5347 Orestelesca
- 13475 Orestes
- 21125 Orff
- 225231 Orhazoltán
- 4540 Oriani
- 7489 Oribe
- 11926 Orinoco
- 701 Oriola
- 591763 Orishutʹ
- 330836 Orius
- 11585 Orlandelassus
- 35324 Orlandi
- 192609 Orlaparker
- 73199 Orlece
- 2188 Orlenok
- 11339 Orlík
- 2724 Orlov
- 34252 Orlovsky
- 13312 Orlowitz
- 2517 Orma
- 167976 Ormsbymitchel
- 350 Ornamenta
- 17777 Ornicar
- 6795 Örnsköldsvik
- 4733 ORO
- 19224 Orosei
- 4201 Orosz
- 3361 Orpheus
- 5284 Orsilocus
- 130158 Orsonjohn
- 89734 Orsoperuzzi
- 576870 Országlili
- 13132 Ortelius
- 4533 Orth
- 2329 Orthos
- 10665 Ortigão
- 8944 Ortigara
- 4436 Ortizmoreno
- 11681 Ortner
- 378370 Orton
- 551 Ortrud
- 2043 Ortutay
- 48482 Oruki
- 21900 Orus
- 11246 Orvillewright
- 11020 Orwell
- 5823 Oryo
- 17546 Osadakentaro
- 7434 Osaka
- 7140 Osaki
- 11930 Osamu
- 19310 Osawa
- 43889 Osawatakaomi
- 20569 Óscarrodríguez
- 105222 Oscarsaa
- 12258 Oscarwilde
- 96200 Oschin
- 11515 Oshijyo
- 5592 Oshima
- 13569 Oshu
- 3593 Osip
- 4986 Osipovia
- 10259 Osipovyurij
- 1923 Osiris
- 1837 Osita
- 750 Oskar
- 59389 Oskarvonmiller
- 28287 Osmanov
- 7305 Ossakajusto
- 7584 Ossietzky
- 59828 Ossikar
- 1369 Ostanina
- 5935 Ostankino
- 7113 Ostapbender
- 343 Ostara
- 9471 Ostend
- 1207 Ostenia
- 6107 Osterbrock
- 10815 Östergarn
- 6797 Östersund
- 30186 Ostojic
- 5859 Ostozhenka
- 8442 Ostralegus
- 30153 Ostrander
- 11128 Ostravia
- 12146 Ostriker
- 3169 Ostro
- 2681 Ostrovskij
- 11844 Ostwald
- 15715 Osuginaoki
- 29427 Oswaldthomas
- 26283 Oswalt
- 16406 Oszkiewicz
- 121339 Otabekburkhonov
- 26127 Otakasakajyo
- 5975 Otakemayumi
- 9844 Otani
- 4491 Otaru
- 21328 Otashi
- 7752 Otauchunokai
- 4405 Otava
- 4979 Otawara
- 4840 Otaynang
- 16644 Otemaedaigaku
- 1529 Oterma
- 1126 Otero
- 10697 Othonwinter
- 9030 Othryoneus
- 913 Otila
- 21270 Otokar
- 3911 Otomo
- 7364 Otonkučera
- 385571 Otrera
- 3738 Ots
- 670 Ottegebe
- 21008 Ottewell
- 994 Otthild
- 22449 Ottijeff
- 401 Ottilia
- 128627 Ottmarsheim
- 2962 Otto
- 2108 Otto Schmidt
- 2227 Otto Struve
- 10787 Ottoburkard
- 10709 Ottofranz
- 555120 Ottoguthier
- 19126 Ottohahn
- 359103 Ottopiene
- 35239 Ottoseydl
- 14468 Ottostern
- 6657 Otukyo
- 5803 Ötzi
- 399745 Ouchaou
- 381260 Ouellette
- 3089 Oujianquan
- 7463 Oukawamine
- 1512 Oulu
- 175397 Oumousangaré
- 4644 Oumu
- 1473 Ounas
- 22395 Ourakenji
- 12367 Ourinhos
- 10771 Ouro Prêto
- 23871 Ousha
- 1396 Outeniqua
- 195853 Ouyangtianjing
- 8919 Ouyangziyuan
- 21574 Ouzan
- 19625 Ovaitt
- 257261 Ovechkin
- 67308 Öveges
- 5038 Overbeek
- 711327 Ovidiuignat
- 2800 Ovidius
- 221073 Ovruch
- 2648 Owa
- 13017 Owakenoomi
- 164792 Owen
- 15608 Owens
- 3464 Owensby
- 9602 Oya
- 19392 Oyamada
- 5912 Oyatoshiyuki
- 10863 Oye
- 34821 Oyetunji
- 434707 Oyfnpripetshik
- 236129 Oysterbay
- 547664 Ozdín
- 7358 Oze
- 6747 Ozegahara
- 10760 Ozeki
- 6839 Ozenuma
- 33471 Ozuna
back to top

== See also ==
- List of minor planet discoverers
- List of observatory codes
- Meanings of minor planet names § Index
