= 1805 Dirikis =

Stony main-belt asteroid

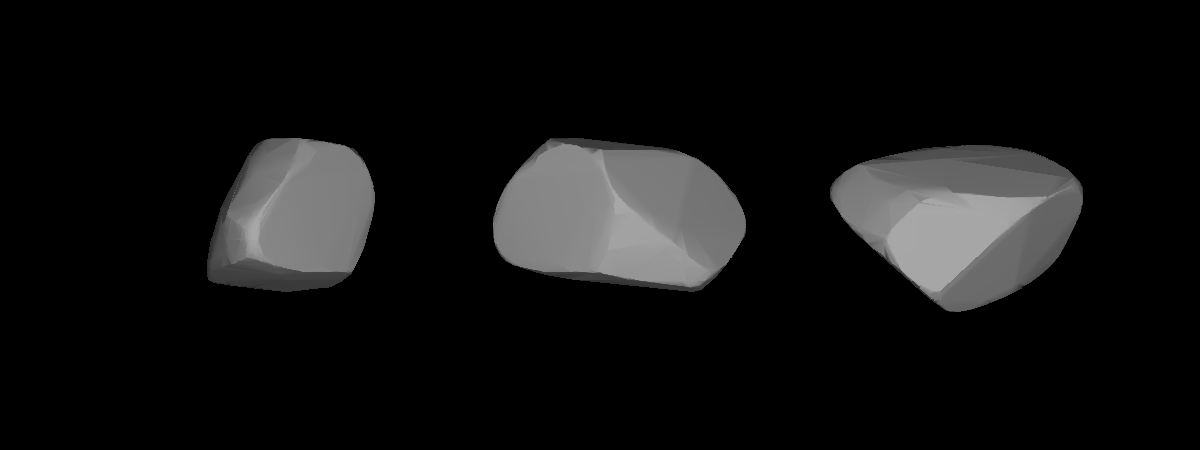
- Lightcurve-based 3-D model of Dirikis

Discovery
- Discovered by: L. Chernykh
- Discovery site: Crimean Astrophysical Obs.
- Discovery date: 1 April 1970

Designations
- Named after: Matiss Dirikis (astronomer)
- Alternative designations: 1970 GD · 1942 EJ; 1948 JH · 1948 JM; 1950 TU_{1} · 1953 EL; 1955 QL_{1} · 1959 JP; 1962 WP · 1962 XC_{1} 1964 FE
- Minor planet category: main-belt · Themis

Orbital characteristics
- Epoch 4 September 2017 (JD 2458000.5)
- Uncertainty parameter 0
- Observation arc: 66.20 yr (24,178 days)
- Aphelion: 3.4915 AU
- Perihelion: 2.7911 AU
- Semi-major axis: 3.1413 AU
- Eccentricity: 0.1115
- Orbital period (sidereal): 5.57 yr (2,034 days)
- Mean anomaly: 235.42°
- Inclination: 2.5157°
- Longitude of ascending node: 78.926°
- Argument of perihelion: 86.389°

Physical characteristics
- Dimensions: 22.05±1.37 km 25.53 km (derived); 25.70±2.7 km 27.228±0.251 km 28.098±0.238 km
- Synodic rotation period: 23.0±0.3 h 23.4543 h
- Geometric albedo: 0.0746 (derived); 0.0893±0.0076; 0.095±0.007; 0.1065±0.026; 0.145±0.019
- Spectral type: S
- Absolute magnitude (H): 11.0 · 11.4

1805 Dirikis, provisional designation 1970 GD, is a stony Themistian asteroid from the outer region of the asteroid belt, approximately 26 kilometers in diameter.

It was discovered on 1 April 1970, by Russian astronomer Lyudmila Chernykh at the Crimean Astrophysical Observatory in Nauchnyj on the Crimean peninsula. It was named for Latvian astronomer Matiss Dirikis.

== Orbit and classification ==
The S-type asteroid is a member of the Themis family, a dynamical population of outer-belt asteroids with nearly coplanar ecliptical orbits. It orbits the Sun at a distance of 2.8–3.5 AU once every 5 years and 7 months (2,034 days). Its orbit has an eccentricity of 0.11 and an inclination of 3° with respect to the ecliptic.

It was first observed at the Finnish Turku Observatory during WWII in 1942. The body's first used observation was its identification as 1955 QL_{1} at Goethe Link Observatory in 1955, extending the asteroid's observation arc by 15 years prior to its official discovery observation.

== Physical characteristics ==
=== Rotation period ===
A rotational lightcurve of Dirikis was obtained from photometric observations taken by French amateur astronomer René Roy In April 2003. It gave a rotation period of 23.0 hours with a brightness variation of 0.45 magnitude (U=2). A 2013-published period of 23.45 hours was derived in an international study (U=n.a.).

=== Diameter and albedo ===
According to the surveys carried out by the Infrared Astronomical Satellite IRAS, the Japanese Akari satellite, and NASA's Wide-field Infrared Survey Explorer with its subsequent NEOWISE mission, Dirikis measures between 22.05 and 28.10 kilometers in diameter, and its surface has an albedo between 0.089 and 0.145. The Collaborative Asteroid Lightcurve Link derives an albedo of 0.075 and calculates a diameter of 25.53 kilometers with an absolute magnitude of 11.4.

== Naming ==
This minor planet was named for astronomer Matiss A. Dirikis (1923–1993), who was a member of the Astronomical Observatory at the University of Latvia, and chairman of the Latvian branch of the Astronomical–Geodetical Society of the U.S.S.R. His work on the motion of small Solar System bodies also contributed to the field of theoretical astronomy. The official naming citation was published by the Minor Planet Center on 1 January 1974 (M.P.C. 3569).
