= Lyudmila Chernykh =

Ukrainian-Russian astronomer (1935–2017)

Minor planets discovered: 267
see § List of discovered minor planets

Lyudmila Ivanivna Chernykh (Ukrainian: Людмила Іванівна Черних; Russian: Людми́ла Ива́новна Черны́х; June 13, 1935 – July 28, 2017) was a Ukrainian-Russian-Soviet astronomer, wife and colleague of Nikolai Stepanovich Chernykh, and a prolific discoverer of minor planets.

== Professional career ==
Chernykh was born in 1935 in Shuya, Ivanovo Oblast. In 1959, she graduated from the Irkutsk State Pedagogical Institute (now the Pedagogical Institute of Irkutsk State University). Between 1959 and 1963, she worked in the Time and Frequency Laboratory of the All-Union Research Institute of Physico-Technical and Radiotechnical Measurements in Irkutsk, where she made astrometrical observations for the Time Service.

Between 1964 and 1998 she was a scientific worker at the Institute of Theoretical Astronomy of the USSR Academy of Sciences (Russian Academy of Science since 1991), working at the observation base of the institute at the Crimean Astrophysical Observatory (CrAO) in Nauchnyy settlement on the Crimean peninsula. In 1998 she was promoted to senior scientific worker at CrAO. The Minor Planet Center (MPC) credits her with the discovery of 267 numbered minor planets, which she made at CrAO between 1966 and 1992. Several of these discoveries she made in collaboration with her husband and with Tamara Smirnova.

== Honors ==
The asteroid 2325 Chernykh, discovered in 1979 by Czech astronomer Antonín Mrkos, was named in her and her husband's honour. The official naming citation was published by the MPC on 1 June 1981 (M.P.C. 6060).

== List of discovered minor planets ==
Two of her notable discoveries are 2127 Tanya – named after Russian child diarist Tanya Savicheva, and 2212 Hephaistos, a near-Earth object of the Apollo group of asteroids.

1737 Severny	13 October 1966	list
1771 Makover	24 January 1968	list
1772 Gagarin	6 February 1968	list
1789 Dobrovolsky	19 August 1966	list
1790 Volkov	9 March 1967	list
1792 Reni	24 January 1968	list
1805 Dirikis	1 April 1970	list
1828 Kashirina	14 August 1966	list
1832 Mrkos	11 August 1969	list
1833 Shmakova	11 August 1969	list
1855 Korolev	8 October 1969	list
1856 Růžena	8 October 1969	list
1889 Pakhmutova	24 January 1968	list
1890 Konoshenkova	6 February 1968	list
1956 Artek	8 October 1969	list
1957 Angara	1 April 1970	list
1975 Pikelner	11 August 1969	list
1976 Kaverin	1 April 1970	list
2008 Konstitutsiya	27 September 1973	list
2030 Belyaev	8 October 1969	list

2031 BAM	8 October 1969	list
2092 Sumiana	16 October 1969	list
2127 Tanya	29 May 1971	list
2132 Zhukov	3 October 1975	list
2142 Landau	3 April 1972	list
2144 Marietta	18 January 1975	list
2186 Keldysh	27 September 1973	list
2205 Glinka	27 September 1973	list
2212 Hephaistos	27 September 1978	list
2245 Hekatostos	24 January 1968	list
2266 Tchaikovsky	12 November 1974	list
2273 Yarilo	6 March 1975	list
2279 Barto	25 February 1968	list
2296 Kugultinov	18 January 1975	list
2341 Aoluta	16 December 1976	list
2352 Kurchatov	10 September 1969	list
2354 Lavrov	9 August 1978	list^{[A]}
2385 Mustel	11 November 1969	list
2386 Nikonov	19 September 1974	list
2419 Moldavia	19 September 1974	list

2446 Lunacharsky	14 October 1971	list
2448 Sholokhov	18 January 1975	list
2457 Rublyov	3 October 1975	list
2467 Kollontai	14 August 1966	list
2468 Repin	8 October 1969	list
2480 Papanov	16 December 1976	list
2489 Suvorov	11 July 1975	list
2530 Shipka	9 July 1978	list
2540 Blok	13 October 1971	list
2551 Decabrina	16 December 1976	list
2561 Margolin	8 October 1969	list
2609 Kiril-Metodi	9 August 1978	list^{[A]}
2669 Shostakovich	16 December 1976	list
2692 Chkalov	16 December 1976	list
2699 Kalinin	16 December 1976	list
2755 Avicenna	26 September 1973	list
2756 Dzhangar	19 September 1974	list
2807 Karl Marx	15 October 1969	list
2833 Radishchev	9 August 1978	list^{[A]}
2837 Griboedov	13 October 1971	list

2877 Likhachev	8 October 1969	list
2894 Kakhovka	27 September 1978	list
2907 Nekrasov	3 October 1975	list
2931 Mayakovsky	16 October 1969	list
2948 Amosov	8 October 1969	list
2965 Surikov	18 January 1975	list
2977 Chivilikhin	19 September 1974	list
2998 Berendeya	3 October 1975	list
3010 Ushakov	27 September 1978	list
3052 Herzen	16 December 1976	list
3126 Davydov	8 October 1969	list
3127 Bagration	27 September 1973	list
3147 Samantha	16 December 1976	list
3232 Brest	19 September 1974	list
3273 Drukar	3 October 1975	list
3321 Dasha	3 October 1975	list
3332 Raksha	4 July 1978	list
3384 Daliya	19 September 1974	list
3429 Chuvaev	19 September 1974	list
3441 Pochaina	8 October 1969	list

3483 Svetlov	16 December 1976	list
3523 Arina	3 October 1975	list
3577 Putilin	7 October 1969	list
3588 Kirik	8 October 1981	list
3608 Kataev	27 September 1978	list
3659 Bellingshausen	8 October 1969	list
3681 Boyan	27 August 1974	list
3702 Trubetskaya	3 July 1970	list
3703 Volkonskaya	9 August 1978	list
3719 Karamzin	16 December 1976	list
3747 Belinskij	5 November 1975	list
3770 Nizami	24 August 1974	list
3804 Drunina	8 October 1969	list
3890 Bunin	18 December 1976	list
3963 Paradzhanov	8 October 1969	list
3967 Shekhtelia	16 December 1976	list
3968 Koptelov	8 October 1978	list
4022 Nonna	8 October 1981	list
4135 Svetlanov	14 August 1966	list^{[B]}
4164 Shilov	16 October 1969	list

4174 Pikulia	16 September 1982	list
4184 Berdyayev	8 October 1969	list
4195 Esambaev	19 September 1982	list
4196 Shuya	16 September 1982	list
4229 Plevitskaya	22 January 1971	list
4235 Tatishchev	27 September 1978	list
4244 Zakharchenko	7 October 1981	list
4286 Rubtsov	8 August 1988	list
4304 Geichenko	27 September 1973	list
4361 Nezhdanova	9 October 1977	list
4371 Fyodorov	10 April 1983	list
4426 Roerich	15 October 1969	list
4437 Yaroshenko	10 April 1983	list
4449 Sobinov	3 September 1987	list
4485 Radonezhskij	27 August 1987	list
4537 Valgrirasp	2 September 1987	list
4560 Klyuchevskij	16 December 1976	list
4594 Dashkova	17 May 1980	list
4605 Nikitin	18 September 1987	list
4616 Batalov	17 January 1975	list

4622 Solovjova	16 November 1979	list
4623 Obraztsova	24 October 1981	list
4681 Ermak	8 October 1969	list
4682 Bykov	27 September 1973	list
4758 Hermitage	27 September 1978	list
4762 Dobrynya	16 September 1982	list
4810 Ruslanova	14 April 1972	list
4869 Piotrovsky	26 October 1989	list
4879 Zykina	12 November 1974	list
4880 Tovstonogov	14 October 1975	list
4915 Solzhenitsyn	8 October 1969	list
4918 Rostropovich	24 August 1974	list
4919 Vishnevskaya	19 September 1974	list
4926 Smoktunovskij	16 September 1982	list
4944 Kozlovskij	2 September 1987	list
4980 Magomaev	19 September 1974	list
4981 Sinyavskaya	12 November 1974	list
5014 Gorchakov	19 September 1974	list
5043 Zadornov	19 September 1974	list
5055 Opekushin	13 August 1986	list

5076 Lebedev-Kumach	26 September 1973	list
5078 Solovjev-Sedoj	19 September 1974	list
5091 Isakovskij	25 September 1981	list
5104 Skripnichenko	7 September 1986	list
5154 Leonov	8 October 1969	list
5158 Ogarev	16 December 1976	list
5300 Sats	19 September 1974	list
5315 Bal'mont	16 September 1982	list
5359 Markzakharov	24 August 1974	list
5361 Goncharov	16 December 1976	list
5385 Kamenka	3 October 1975	list
5483 Cherkashin	17 October 1990	list
5612 Nevskij	3 October 1975	list
5613 Donskoj	16 December 1976	list
5675 Evgenilebedev	7 September 1986	list
5711 Eneev	27 September 1978	list
5795 Roshchina	27 September 1978	list
5807 Mshatka	30 August 1986	list
5827 Letunov	15 November 1990	list
5857 Neglinka	3 October 1975	list

5858 Borovitskia	28 September 1978	list
5940 Feliksobolev	8 October 1981	list
5955 Khromchenko	2 September 1987	list
6110 Kazak	4 July 1978	list
6113 Tsap	16 September 1982	list
6121 Plachinda	2 September 1987	list
6161 Vojno-Yasenetsky	14 October 1971	list
6166 Univsima	27 September 1978	list
6180 Bystritskaya	8 August 1986	list
6232 Zubitskia	19 September 1985	list^{[A]}
6355 Univermoscow	15 October 1969	list
6374 Beslan	8 August 1986	list
6432 Temirkanov	3 October 1975	list
6511 Furmanov	27 August 1987	list
6538 Muraviov	25 September 1981	list
6547 Vasilkarazin	2 September 1987	list
6573 Magnitskij	19 September 1974	list
6589 Jankovich	19 September 1985	list^{[A]}
6591 Sabinin	7 September 1986	list
6619 Kolya	27 September 1973	list

6679 Gurzhij	16 October 1969	list
6755 Solov'yanenko	16 December 1976	list
6764 Kirillavrov	7 October 1981	list
6783 Gulyaev	24 September 1990	list
6784 Bogatikov	28 October 1990	list
6890 Savinykh	3 September 1975	list
6942 Yurigulyaev	16 December 1976	list
7370 Krasnogolovets	27 September 1978	list
7457 Veselov	16 September 1982	list
7468 Anfimov	17 October 1990	list
7469 Krikalev	15 November 1990	list
7726 Olegbykov	27 August 1974	list
7730 Sergerasimov	4 July 1978	list
7869 Pradun	2 September 1987	list
7924 Simbirsk	6 August 1986	list^{[A]}
7978 Niknesterov	27 September 1978	list
8132 Vitginzburg	18 December 1976	list
8244 Mikolaichuk	3 October 1975	list
8444 Popovich	8 October 1969	list
8608 Chelomey	16 December 1976	list

8839 Novichkova	24 October 1989	list
8985 Tula	9 August 1978	list^{[A]}
9146 Tulikov	16 December 1976	list
9150 Zavolokin	27 September 1978	list
9154 Kol'tsovo	16 September 1982	list
9167 Kharkiv	18 September 1987	list
9168 Sarov	18 September 1987	list
9176 Struchkova	15 November 1990	list
9516 Inasan	16 December 1976	list
9549 Akplatonov	19 September 1985	list^{[A]}
9565 Tikhonov	18 September 1987	list
9566 Rykhlova	18 September 1987	list
9609 Ponomarevalya	26 August 1992	list
9718 Gerbefremov	16 December 1976	list
9733 Valtikhonov	19 September 1985	list^{[A]}
9933 Alekseev	19 September 1985	list^{[A]}
10001 Palermo	8 October 1969	list
10002 Bagdasarian	8 October 1969	list
10007 Malytheatre	16 December 1976	list
10010 Rudruna	9 August 1978	list^{[A]}

10015 Valenlebedev	27 September 1978	list
10023 Vladifedorov	17 November 1979	list
10054 Solomin	17 September 1987	list
10262 Samoilov	3 October 1975	list
10286 Shnollia	16 September 1982	list
10459 Vladichaika	27 September 1978	list
10992 Veryuslaviya	19 September 1974	list
11016 Borisov	16 September 1982	list
11027 Astaf'ev	7 September 1986	list
11480 Velikij Ustyug	7 September 1986	list
11782 Nikolajivanov	8 October 1969	list
11824 Alpaidze	16 September 1982	list
12190 Sarkisov	27 September 1978	list
12219 Grigor'ev	19 September 1982	list
12664 Sonisenia	27 September 1978	list
13477 Utkin	5 November 1975	list
13479 Vet	8 October 1977	list
13480 Potapov	9 August 1978	list^{[A]}
13904 Univinnitsa	3 October 1975	list
13922 Kremenia	19 September 1985	list^{[A]}

14339 Knorre	10 April 1983	list
14789 GAISH	8 October 1969	list
14834 Isaev	17 September 1987	list
15199 Rodnyanskaya	19 September 1974	list
15212 Yaroslavl'	17 November 1979	list
15669 Pshenichner	19 September 1974	list
15675 Goloseevo	27 September 1978	list
15676 Almoisheev	8 October 1978	list
15702 Olegkotov	2 September 1987	list
16395 Ioannpravednyj	23 October 1981	list
16407 Oiunskij	19 September 1985	list^{[A]}
16515 Usman'grad	15 November 1990	list
16516 Efremlevitan	15 November 1990	list
17358 Lozino-Lozinskij	27 September 1978	list
18285 Vladplatonov	14 April 1972	list
18287 Verkin	3 October 1975	list
18293 Pilyugin	27 September 1978	list
18294 Rudenko	27 September 1978	list
19919 Pogorelov	8 October 1977	list
19962 Martynenko	7 September 1986	list

23402 Turchina	8 October 1969	list
24604 Vasilermakov	27 September 1973	list
24648 Evpatoria	19 September 1985	list^{[A]}
24649 Balaklava	19 September 1985	list^{[A]}
29081 Krymradio	27 September 1978	list
32735 Strekalov	27 September 1978	list
43783 Svyatitelpyotr	24 October 1989	list
Co-discovery made with:^{A} N. S. Chernykh^{B} T. M. Smirnova
