= 2008 Konstitutsiya =

Carbonaceous asteroid

Discovery
- Discovered by: L. Chernykh
- Discovery site: Crimean Astrophysical Obs.
- Discovery date: 27 September 1973

Designations
- Named after: 1977 Soviet Constitution
- Alternative designations: 1973 SV_{4} · 1938 SV; 1950 VG · 1953 EH; 1953 FE · 1967 RY; 1973 UE · 1976 ED
- Minor planet category: main-belt · (outer)

Orbital characteristics
- Epoch 4 September 2017 (JD 2458000.5)
- Uncertainty parameter 0
- Observation arc: 49.63 yr (18,127 days)
- Aphelion: 3.5286 AU
- Perihelion: 2.8995 AU
- Semi-major axis: 3.2141 AU
- Eccentricity: 0.0979
- Orbital period (sidereal): 5.76 yr (2,105 days)
- Mean anomaly: 35.505°
- Mean motion: 0° 10^{m} 15.6^{s} / day
- Inclination: 20.667°
- Longitude of ascending node: 15.619°
- Argument of perihelion: 201.79°

Physical characteristics
- Dimensions: 45.46±19.42 km 50.07±0.66 km 50.31 km (derived); 51.37±0.80 km 52.023±0.135 km 53.942±0.281 km
- Synodic rotation period: 11.2692±0.0004 h 11.279±0.009 h
- Geometric albedo: 0.0505±0.0080; 0.056±0.002; 0.0580 (derived); 0.06±0.06; 0.070±0.010
- Spectral type: C
- Absolute magnitude (H): 10.00 · 10.2 · 10.32

2008 Konstitutsiya, provisionally designated 1973 SV_{4}, is a carbonaceous asteroid from the outer region of the asteroid belt, approximately 50 kilometers in diameter. It was discovered on 27 September 1973, by Soviet astronomer Lyudmila Chernykh at the Crimean Astrophysical Observatory in Nauchnyj, on the Crimean peninsula. The asteroid was named for the 1977 Soviet Constitution.

== Classification and orbit ==
Konstitutsiya orbits the Sun in the outer main-belt at a distance of 2.9–3.5 AU once every 5 years and 9 months (2,105 days). Its orbit has an eccentricity of 0.10 and an inclination of 21° with respect to the ecliptic. In September 1938, the asteroid was first identified as 1938 SV at Turku Observatory, Finland, extending the body's observation arc by 35 years prior to its official discovery observation at Nauchnyj.

== Physical characteristics ==
Konstitutsiya is an assumed C-type asteroid.

=== Lightcurves ===
Two rotational lightcurves of Konstitutsiya were obtained from photometric observations in 2011. Lightcurve analysis gave a rotation period of 11.2692 and 11.279 hours with a low brightness variation of 0.08 and 0.06 magnitude, respectively (U=3/3-). A low brightness amplitude suggests that the body has a nearly spheroidal shape.

=== Diameter and albedo ===
According to the surveys carried out by the Japanese Akari satellite and the NEOWISE mission of NASA's Wide-field Infrared Survey Explorer, Konstitutsiya measures between 45.46 and 53.942 kilometers in diameter and its surface has an albedo between 0.0505 and 0.070. The Collaborative Asteroid Lightcurve Link derives an albedo of 0.0580 and a diameter of 50.31 kilometers based on an absolute magnitude of 10.2.

== Naming ==
This minor planet was named on the occasion of the adoption of the new 1977 Soviet Constitution, also known as Brezhnev Constitution. It was the third and last Soviet Constitution ever to be adopted. The official naming citation was published by the Minor Planet Center on 1 September 1978 (M.P.C. 4481).
