= Bazan (surname) =

Bazán
- Etymology: Baztan
- Place of origin: Navarre, Spain

Bazan is a Spanish surname of Navarran origin. It is also a surname of unrelated Polish and Ukrainian origin, meaning pheasant. Notable people with this surname include:

== XVI – XVIII century ==
- Álvaro de Bazán the Elder (1506–1558), Spanish naval commander from an old Navarrese noble family
- Álvaro de Bazán, 1st Marquess of Santa Cruz (1526–1588), Spanish admiral
- Álvaro de Bazán, 2nd Marquess of Santa Cruz (1571–1646), the son of Álvaro de Bazán, 1st Marquess of Santa Cruz
- Antonio Benavides Bazán y Molina (1678–1772), Lieutenant General in the Spanish Army
- Antonio Valdés y Fernández Bazán (1744–1816), naval officer of the Spanish Royal Navy
- Ignacio de Arteaga y Bazán (1731–1783), officer of the Spanish Navy
- José Gabriel de Silva-Bazán, 10th Marquess of Santa Cruz (1782–1839), Spanish noble, first Director of the Prado Museum
- Juan de Zúñiga Avellaneda y Bazán (1551–1608), Spanish nobleman during the reigns of Philip II and Philip III
- Juan Gregorio Bazán (1510–1570), Spanish military man

== XIX – XXI century ==
- Abel Bazán (1833–1903), Argentine politician and jurist
- Ada Zayas-Bazán (born 1958), children's author, poet and teacher from Cuba
- Carlos Bazán Zender (1937–2019), Peruvian medical doctor and politician
- César Bazán Pérez (born 1974), Mexican former professional boxer
- César Vásquez Bazán (born 1952), economist, graduate professor and Peruvian politician
- David Bazan (born 1976), American indie rock singer-songwriter
- Daniel Bazán Vera (born 1973), Argentine association football forward
- Dominador Baldomero Bazán (1937–2006), the Second Vice President of Panama from 1999 to 2004
- Emilia Pardo Bazán (1851–1921), countess of Pardo Bazán, Spanish novelist, journalist, literary critic, poet, playwright, translator, editor and professor
- Fortunato Hernández Bazán, Mexican artisan
- Francisco De Paula Bazán (born 1980), Peruvian goalkeeper
- Geraldine Bazán (born 1983), Mexican actress, singer, and anchorwoman
- Gonzalo Ismael Bazán (born 1989), Argentine professional footballer
- Guillermo Bazan, American chemist, material scientist, and academic
- Héctor Rodrigo Bazán Chiesa (born 2001), Peruvian footballer
- Javier Moreno Bazan (born 1984), Spanish professional mountain biking racer
- Jorge Bazán (born 1991), Peruvian footballer
- José Luis Martínez Bazán, (1942–2015), Uruguayan football referees
- Josep Bazán (1933–2023), Spanish water polo player
- Julio Bazan, Argentine journalist
- Leandro Bazán (born 1990), Argentinian footballer
- Leonid Bazan (born 1985), Ukrainian-born amateur, and later, Bulgarian freestyle wrestler
- Mario Bazán (born 1987), Peruvian runner
- Mauro Ezequiel Bazan (born 1993), Argentine footballer
- Nazareno Bazán (born 1999), Argentine professional footballer
- Nicolas Bazan, neuroscientist and eye researcher, author, educator, mentor, developer, music enthusiast, and art lover
- Omar Bazán Flores (born 1976), Mexican politician
- Osvaldo Bazán (1934–1997), Argentine chess player

== See also ==
- Bazan (disambiguation)
- Bazzano (disambiguation)
- Bazzani
- Basan
- Bassan (disambiguation)
- Bassani
- Basso (surname)
