= Basin (surname) =

Basin or Bassin, Slavic feminine: Basina, is a surname of multiple origins. As a Jewish one (may also be transliterated as Bassin), it is a matronymic surname derived from the feminine given name Basia, a diminutive of Barbara. Notable people with the surname include:

- Benjamin Bassin (1944–2018), Finnish official and ambassador
- Elieser Bassin (1840–1898), Russian-Jewish convert to Christianity, and an author and proponent of British Israelism
- Ian Bassin American lawyer, writer, and activist
- Marianna Basina (1916–1994) Soviet and Russian writer, biographer
- Mark Bassin, American geographer and specialist on Russian and German geopolitics
- Meyer Basin (1890–1918), Russian revolutionary
- Pyotr Basin (1793–1877), Russian religious, history and portrait painter
- Rose Ethel Bassin (1889–1974), Scottish writer, music educator, and folklorist
- Sherwood Bassin, Canadian ice hockey executive
- Thomas Basin (1412–1491), French bishop of Lisieux and historian
- Yakov Basin (1939–2022), Soviet and Belarusian physician, historian, cultural scientist, publicist and public figure of the Jewish community in Belarus
- Max Bassin (b. 2002), American musician and drummer for New York-based art rock band Geese
