= River Landscape (Carracci) =

Painting series by Annibale Carracci

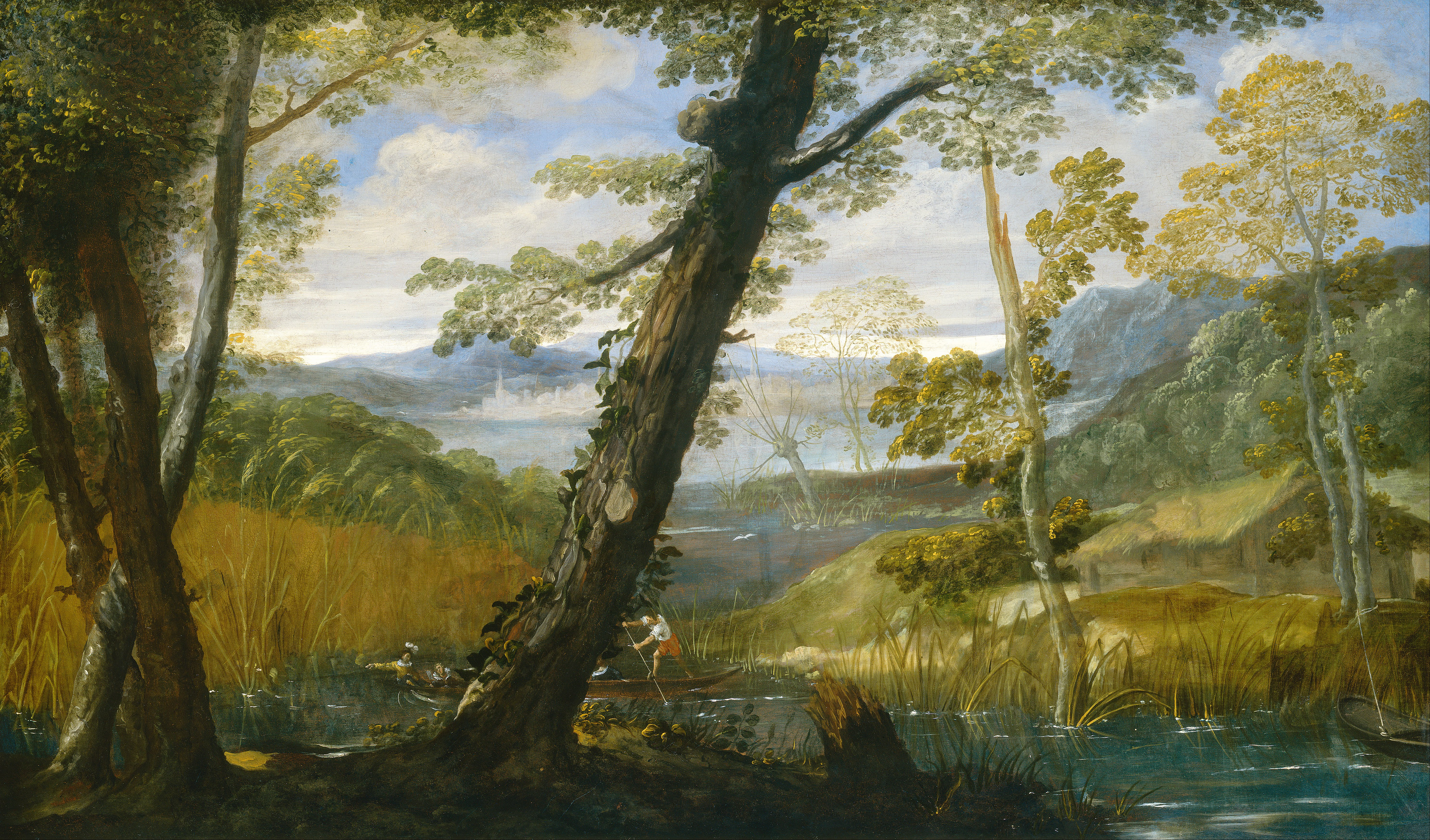
- Artist: Annibale Carracci
- Year: c.1590
- Medium: oil on canvas
- Dimensions: 88.3 cm × 148.1 cm (34.8 in × 58.3 in)
- Location: National Gallery of Art, Washington D.C.

River Landscape is a painting by the Italian artist Annibale Carracci which is part of the Samuel H. Kress Collection in the National Gallery of Art, Washington D.C. It was painted in Italy c. 1590 when Carracci and his brother and cousin were pioneering the creation of naturalistic landscape works in which the countryside was depicted for its own sake, rather than as a stylised backdrop to a religious or mythological subject. It can be compared in this respect with his earlier paintings Fishing and Hunting, now both in the Louvre.

The painting would have been created in the studio from sketches made in the field. Characteristically of Carracci's landscapes a dark foreground frames the distant view, the perspective enhanced by trees of diminishing height.

The painting was acquired by the English art connoisseur John Rushout, 2nd Baron Northwick and displayed in his private gallery at Thirlestaine House near Cheltenham, England. When the collection was sold on his death in 1859 River Landscape was described as a work of Velazquez and only many years later was it ascribed to Carracci. It was bought in 1948 by its present owners, the Samuel H. Kress Foundation of New York and in recent years has been restored by the removal of discoloured varnish and the retouching of abraded paint.

== See also ==
- 100 Great Paintings, 1980 BBC series
