= Kyapanak =

Kyapanak may refer to:

- Musayelyan, Akhuryan, Armenia, formerly Mets Kyapanak
- Ovit, Armenia, formerly Pokr Kyapanak
