= Basen =

Basen may refer to:

- Basen, Armenia, village in Armenia
- Basen Górniczy, neighborhood of Szczecin, Poland
- Basen, Podlaskie Voivodeship, town in Poland
- Ba Sen, Chinese-Mongol actor, descendant of Chagatai
- Leila Basen (born 1955), Canadian film and television writer and producer

== See also ==
- Basin (disambiguation)
