= Fishing (disambiguation) =

Fishing is the activity of trying to catch wild fish.

Fishing may also refer to:

- Fishing (Carracci), a 1590s painting
- Fishing (sculpture), a 1938 sculpture in the United States
- "Fishing" (song), a 1991 indie rock song
- "Fishing" (The Apprentice), a 2022 television episode

== See also ==
- Phishing, the deceptive online practice.
