= HACM =

HACM may refer to:

- Housing Authority of the City of Milwaukee, a public housing agency in Milwaukee, Wisconsin
- Hypersonic Attack Cruise Missile, a hypersonic air-launched cruise missile project
