= The Basin =

The Basin may refer to several places:

- The Basin, New South Wales, a suburb of Sydney, Australia
- The Basin, Victoria, an outer eastern suburb of Melbourne, Australia
- The Basin (Rottnest Island), Western Australia
- The Basin, a geologic feature within Franconia Notch State Park in New Hampshire, United States
- Basin Reserve, a cricket ground in Wellington, New Zealand

== See also ==
- Basin (disambiguation)
