= Moses Margoliouth =

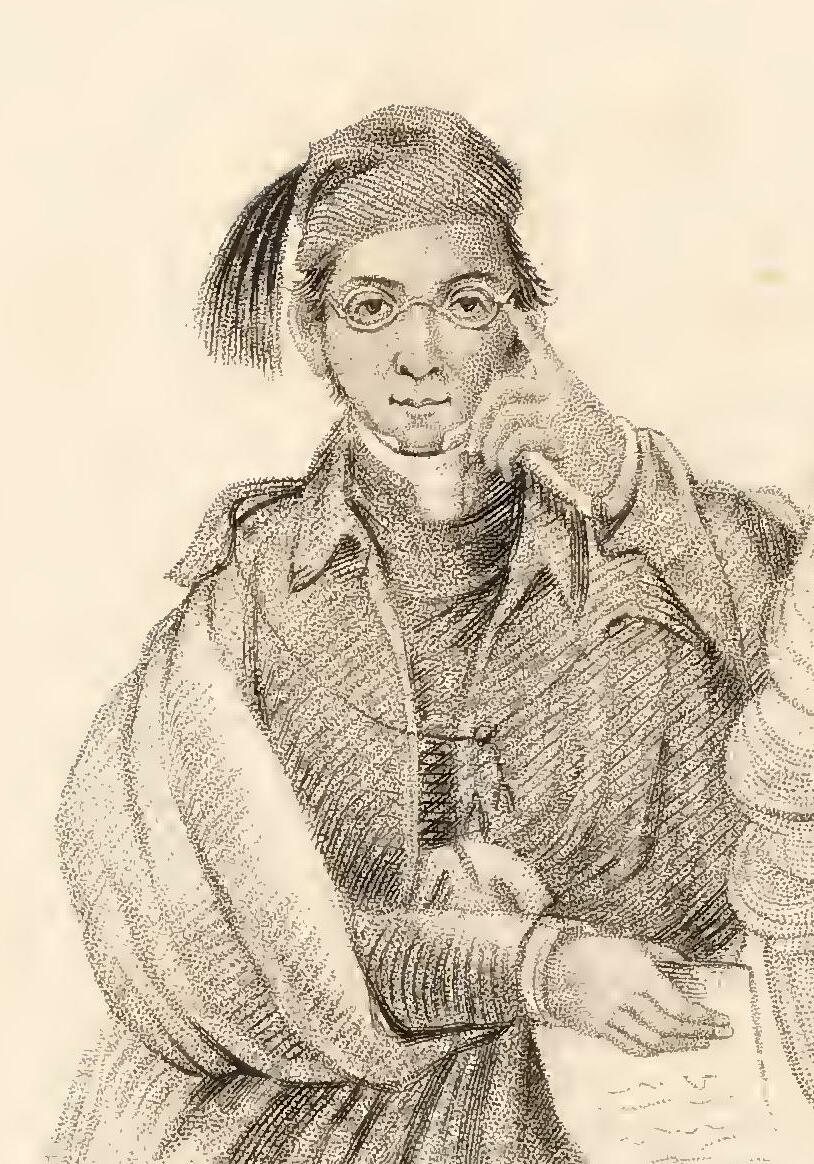
Moses Margoliouth, age 30, portrait in the 1850 published book about his pilgrimage

Moses Margoliouth (1820–1881) was a Polish-born British scholar and Jewish convert to Christianity. He became a minister in the Church of England. Alongside Elieser Bassin, he was also one of the first proponents of British Israelism to be of Jewish descent. He published History of the Jews in Great Britain (1851) and Vestiges of the Historic Anglo-Hebrews in East Anglia (1870).

His nephew was David Samuel Margoliouth.

== Life ==
He was born of Jewish parents at Suwałki, Poland, on 3 December 1820. He was instructed at Pryerosl, Grodno, and Kalwarya in talmudic and rabbinical learning, and also acquired Russian and German. In August 1837, during a visit to Liverpool, he was induced to carefully study the Hebrew New Testament, with the result that on 13 April 1838 he was baptised a member of the Church of England. For a time he obtained a livelihood by giving lessons in Hebrew, but in January 1840 he entered Trinity College, Dublin, to prepare for ordination, and during the vacations studied at the Hebrew College, London.

In 1843, he became instructor of Hebrew, German, and English at the Liverpool Institution for Inquiring Jews. On 30 June 1844, he was ordained to the curacy of St. Augustine, Liverpool. Three months later, the Bishop of Kildare obtained for him the incumbency of Glasnevin, near Dublin, and made him his examining chaplain. The parish being small, Margoliouth had much leisure for literary pursuits. He started a Hebrew Christian monthly magazine, entitled The Star of Jacob, which extended to six numbers (January–June 1847), and tried to establish a Philo-Hebraic Society for promoting the study of Hebrew literature, and for reprinting scarce Hebrew works. In 1847, he visited the Holy Land, and on his return published an account of his “pilgrimage”.

He subsequently served curacies at Tranmere, Cheshire; St. Bartholomew, Salford; Wybunbury, Cheshire (1853–5); St. Paul, Haggerston, London; Wyton, Huntingdonshire; and St. Paul, Onslow Square, London. In 1857, he accepted the Ph.D. degree of Erlangen. From 1872 to 1877 he published a quarterly periodical called The Hebrew Christian Witness and Prophetic Investigator. In 1877, he was presented to the vicarage of Little Linford, Buckinghamshire.

Among the Jewish nation he was an indefatigable worker. During his travels he made the acquaintance of many celebrated men, among whom were August Neander, Felix Mendelssohn Bartholdy, and Giuseppe Caspar Mezzofanti.

He died in London on 25 February 1881, and was buried in Little Linford churchyard.

== Publications ==
- An Exposition of the Fifty-third Chapter of Isaiah (1846 and 1856).
- The fundamental principles of modern Judaism investigated (1843)
- A Pilgrimage to the Land of my Fathers (1850)
- The History of the Jews in Great Britain (1851)
- A'Genuine Repentance and its Effects: an Exposition of the Fourteenth Chapter of Hosea (1854)
- The Anglo-Hebrews, their Past Wrongs and Present Grievances (1856)
- The Curates of Riversdale: Recollections in the Life of a Clergyman (1860)
- The End of the Law, being a preliminary Examination of the "Essays and Reviews" (1861)
- Abyssinia, its Past, Present, and probable Future (1866)
- Vestiges of the Historic Anglo-Hebrews in East Anglia (1870)
- The Oracles of God, and Their Vindication: Being a Sermon [on Ezek. Xiii. 7], Etc (1870)
- The Poetry of the Hebrew Pentateuch: Being Four Essays on Moses and the Mosaic Age (1871)
- The Lord's Prayer, no adaptation of existing Jewish Petitions, explained by the light of the Day of the Lord (1876)
- Some Triumphs and Trophies of the Light of the World (1882)
