= Bassano (surname) =

Bassano is an Italian surname. Notable people with the surname include:

- Aemilia Bassano (known as Emilia Lanier), first English woman professional poet.
- Alexander Bassano (1829–1913), photographer, founder of companies in London known as:
  - Bassano and Davis, of 122 Regent Street (c. 1866)
  - Bassano's Studio's Ltd, of 25 Old Bond Street, (1904–1905)
  - Bassano Limited, of 25 Old Bond Street (from 1906)
  - Bassano and Vandyck Studio, (from 1964)
- Anthony Bassano, musician, son of Jeronimo Bassano
- Augustine Bassano (1530–1604), composer and lutenist b. Venice (?), d. London
- Cesare Bassano (1584–1648), Italian painter and engraver
- Chris Bassano, cricketer
- Francesco Bassano the Elder (c. 1475–1539), painter
- Francesco Bassano the Younger (1549–1592), painter
- Giovanni Bassano (c. 1558 – c. 1617), a Venetian composer and cornettist
- Jacopo Bassano (c. 1515–1592), a Venetian painter
- Jeronimo Bassano, a 16th-century Venetian musician who led a family of musicians who moved to the court of Henry VIII of England
- Leandro Bassano (1557–1622), painter
- Louisa Bassano, a 19th-century singer, elder sister of Alexander Bassano
- Peter Bassano (1945–2025), English conductor and trombonist, descendant of Anthony Bassano

== See also ==
- Hugues-Bernard Maret, Duc de Bassano (1763–1839), a French statesman
