= Bassani =

Bassani is an Italian surname. Notable people with the surname include:

- Antonella Bassani (born 2006), Brazilian racing driver
- Axel Bassani (born 1999), Italian motorcycle racer
- Edvin Liverić-Bassani (born 1970), Croatian theatre, television, film actor, pancer, performer and cultural manager
- Francesco Bassani (1853–1916), Italian geologist and paleontologist
- Francesco Maria Bazzani (c.1650 – c.1700), Italian baroque composer
- Franco Bassani (1929–2008), Italian physicist
- Gaia Bassani Antivari (born 1978), alpine skier
- Giorgio Bassani (1916–2000), Italian novelist
- Giovanni Battista Bassani (1650 ? – 1716), Italian composer, violinist, and organist
- Johanna Bassani (2002–2020), Austrian combined Nordic skier and ski jumper
- Luca Bassani (born c. 1956), founder of Wally Yachts
- Orazio Bassani, "Orazio della Viola" (before 1570 - 1615), Italian viola-da-gambist
- Rodrigo Bassani da Cruz (born 1997), Brazilian footballer

== See also ==
- Gaia Bassani Antivari (born 1978), alpine skier
- Bassanio, a fictional character in Shakespeare's The Merchant of Venice
- Bassano (disambiguation)
