= Bazzani =

Bazzani is an Italian surname most common in the region of Emilia-Romagna, Italy Notable people with the surname include:

- Bazzani (footballer), full name Olivério Bazzani Filho (1935–2007), Brazilian footballer
- Bazzaninho, full name Oliver Roberto Bazzani (1941–2016), Brazilian footballer
- Cesare Bazzani (1873 - 1939), Italian architect
- Domenico Conti Bazzani (1740–1817), Italian painter
- Fabio Bazzani (born 1976), Italian footballer
- Francesco Maria Bazzani (1650–1700), Italian baroque composer
- Gaspare Bazzani (1701–1780), Italian painter
- Giuseppe Bazzani (1690–1769), Italian painter
- Luigi Bazzani (1836–1927), Italian painter, watercolorist, and theater set designer
- Loris Bazzani (1984 - present), Italian computer scientist specialized in computer vision
