= Liverić =

Liverić is a Croatian surname. Notable people with the surname include:

- Alen Liverić (born 1967), Croatian actor
- Mark Liveric (born 1953), Yugoslav-American footballer
- Edvin Liverić-Bassani (born 1970), Croatian actor, dancer, performer, and cultural manager
