= Parklawn =

Parklawn may refer to:

- Parklawn, California, United States
- Parklawn Memorial Park, a cemetery in Rockville, Maryland, U.S.
- Parklawn, a development of the Housing Authority of the City of Milwaukee, Wisconsin, U.S.
