= Basin =

Basin may refer to:

== Geography and geology ==
- Depression (geology)
  - Back-arc basin, a submarine feature associated with island arcs and subduction zones
  - Drainage basin (hydrology), a topographic region in which all water drains to a common area
  - Endorheic basin, a closed topographic low area with no drainage outlet
  - Impact basin, a large impact crater
    - Lunar basin, an impact crater that has been flooded with basalt, forming a mare
  - Retention basin, stormwater runoff to prevent flooding and downstream erosion which includes a permanent pool of water
  - Detention basin, a man-made basin used to temporarily store surplus water from rivers.
  - Sedimentary basin (sedimentology), a low and usually sinking region that is filled with sediments from adjacent higher areas
  - Structural basin, rock strata formed by tectonic warping of previously flat-lying strata
    - Oceanic basin, a structural basin covered by seawater
    - Pull-apart basin, a section of crust separated by the action of two strike-slip faults
  - Tidal basin, an area that fills with water at high tide
- Tropical cyclone basins, oceans or areas of oceans used for classifying tropical cyclones

== Objects ==
- Bowl, a round container
  - Pudding basin, a bowl in which raw pudding dough or batter is placed for cooking
- Emesis basin, a kidney-shaped bowl used in hospitals etc. for vomit
- Sink, a plumbing fixture
- Toilet basin, an alternate name for the bowl (pan) of a flush toilet
- Wash basin, a sink or bowl to contain water for cleaning hands and other minor washing
  - Basin stand or washstand, an obsolete piece of furniture to hold a wash basin, jug, towel, etc.

== Place names ==
=== Oceania ===
- Basin Reserve, New Zealand, a cricket ground in Wellington
- The Basin (Rottnest Island), Western Australia
- The Basin, New South Wales, Australia, a locality in northern Sydney
- The Basin, Victoria, Australia, a suburb in Melbourne

=== United States ===
- Basin, Alabama
- Basin, California, an unincorporated community now named Huntington Lake, California
- Basin Mountain (California)
- Basin, Mississippi
- Basin, Montana
- Basin, Wyoming, seat of Big Horn County
- Basin Mountain (New York), a summit of the Adirondack Park
- Basin Street, New Orleans, Louisiana
- Mill Basin, Brooklyn, in New York
- The Basin, a river pothole in Franconia Notch State Park

=== Elsewhere ===
- Basin (Martian crater)
- Basin, Masovian Voivodeship, Poland
- Bašin, Serbia
- Basin, Polish name for Basina, Belarus
- Amazon Basin (sedimentary basin)

== Other uses ==
- "Basin" (chanson de geste), a poem about Charlemagne's childhood
- Basin, the area of a dry dock which can be flooded and drained
- Basin of attraction, in mathematics, an area of a nonlinear system with an attractor
- Canal basin, a docking section of canal wide enough to allow for uninterrupted canal traffic
- Basin (horse), American Thoroughbred racehorse
- Basin (surname)
- Water resource basin, a subdivision of the U.S. hydrologic unit system

== See also ==
- Basan (disambiguation)
- Basen (disambiguation)
- Bassin (disambiguation)
