= Music (Kahlich) =

Sculpture by Karl Kahlich

- Artist: Karl Kahlich
- Year: 1938
- Type: carved Currie Park limestone
- Location: 4434 W. Marion St., Milwaukee, Wisconsin; 43°5′46.024″N 87°58′10.055″W
- Owner: Housing Authority of the City of Milwaukee

Music is a public art work by Karl Kahlich located in Monument Park at the Parklawn development of the Housing Authority of the City of Milwaukee, northwest of downtown Milwaukee, Wisconsin. Music is carved from local limestone and depicts a figure in a cap holding a circular instrument on his lap. The sculpture was installed in 1938 as one of four public artworks based on the theme of leisure activity.

== Description ==
Music is carved from a large block of limestone quarried at nearby Currie Park. The figure's head wears a cap and is turned to the side. He holds a circular instrument on his lap. One hand is in front of the instrument and the other is at his side.

The artwork was commissioned during the federal Works Progress Administration's campaign to put Americans to work by improving local infrastructure under Franklin D. Roosevelt's New Deal. When Milwaukee constructed Parklawn using WPA labor, Karl Kahlich was commissioned to create decorative sculptures for the development's massive park. Kahlich was a participant in the Federal Art Project of the WPA.

=== Restoration ===
In 1998, Parklawn underwent a $34 million revitalization and the Housing Authority of the City of Milwaukee decided to restore the sculptures and give them a prominent location in a new common green space called Monument Park. Walkways connect Kahlich's Music and Fishing with a central gazebo, informational plaques, time capsules, a stone war memorial, and other artwork.

== See also ==
- List of New Deal sculpture
