= 6793 Palazzolo =

Main-belt asteroid discovered by Italian astronomers

Discovery
- Discovered by: U. Quadri; L. Strabla
- Discovery site: Bassano Bresciano Obs.
- Discovery date: 30 December 1991

Designations
- Named after: Palazzolo sull'Oglio (Italian city)
- Alternative designations: 1991 YE · 1982 YS_{2} 1990 SZ_{23}
- Minor planet category: main-belt · (middle)

Orbital characteristics
- Epoch 4 September 2017 (JD 2458000.5)
- Uncertainty parameter 0
- Observation arc: 33.90 yr (12,382 days)
- Aphelion: 3.1007 AU
- Perihelion: 2.2594 AU
- Semi-major axis: 2.6800 AU
- Eccentricity: 0.1569
- Orbital period (sidereal): 4.39 yr (1,603 days)
- Mean anomaly: 273.56°
- Mean motion: 0° 13^{m} 28.56^{s} / day
- Inclination: 4.9244°
- Longitude of ascending node: 106.38°
- Argument of perihelion: 46.196°

Physical characteristics
- Dimensions: 8.01 km (calculated); 9.882±0.051 km
- Synodic rotation period: 6.190±0.040 h 6.2308±0.0072 h 6.2323±0.0072 h
- Geometric albedo: 0.083±0.004; 0.10 (assumed)
- Spectral type: S
- Absolute magnitude (H): 13.6 · 13.78±0.23 · 13.520±0.110 · 13.3 · 14.143±0.005 (S) · 13.709±0.002 (R)

6793 Palazzolo, provisional designation 1991 YE, is a stony asteroid from the middle region of the asteroid belt, approximately 9 kilometers in diameter. It was discovered on 30 December 1991, by Italian amateur astronomers Ulisse Quadri and Luca Strabla at the Bassano Bresciano Observatory in northern Italy. The asteroid was named after the Italian city of Palazzolo sull'Oglio.

== Orbit and classification ==
Palazzolo orbits the Sun in the central main-belt at a distance of 2.3–3.1 AU once every 4 years and 5 months (1,603 days). Its orbit has an eccentricity of 0.16 and an inclination of 5° with respect to the ecliptic.

In 1982, the asteroid was first identified as 1982 YS_{2} at Crimea–Nauchnij. Its observation arc begins 1990, with its identification as 1990 SZ_{23} at ESO's La Silla Observatory, 1 year prior to its official discovery observation at Bassano Bresciano.

== Physical characteristics ==
Palazzolo is an assumed S-type asteroid.

=== Rotation period ===
In 2012, a rotational lightcurve of Palazzolo was obtained from photometric observations at the Palomar Transient Factory in California. Lightcurve analysis gave a rotation period of 6.2308 hours with a brightness amplitude of 0.16 in magnitude (U=2).

Follow-up observations in 2013 and 2014, gave a similar period of 6.190 and 6.2323 hours with an amplitude of 0.16 and 0.14, respectively (U=2/2).

=== Diameter and albedo ===
According to the survey carried out by the NEOWISE mission of NASA's space-based Wide-field Infrared Survey Explorer, Palazzolo has a diameter of 9.9 kilometers and an albedo of 0.083, while the Collaborative Asteroid Lightcurve Link assumes an albedo of 0.10 and calculates a diameter of 8.0 kilometers.

== Naming ==
This minor planet is named after the Italian city of Palazzolo sull'Oglio, located between Brescia and Bergamo, in northern parts of the country. Known for its industries, including the first Italian factories producing cement and buttons, the city is now famous for its of spinning machines and zippers. It was founded on the banks of river Oglio, with archaeological findings dating back to the Roman era. The approved naming citation was published by the Minor Planet Center on 4 April 1996 (M.P.C. 26933).
