= Bazan =

Bazan or Bazán may refer to:

== Places ==
- Bazan, Iran, in Mazandaran Province, Iran
  - Bazan Rural District, in Kermanshah Province, Iran
- Bazán, Ciudad Real, a Spanish village formed by Francoist Spain's Instituto Nacional de Colonización
- Bazan, Bulgaria, a village in Ruse Municipality, Bulgaria

== Other uses ==
- BAZAN Group, an Israeli oil refining company
- Navantia, a Spanish shipbuilding firm formerly named Empresa Nacional Bazán
- Bazan (surname), people with the surname Bazan

== See also ==
- Basan (disambiguation)
