= Frances Tolmie =

Scottish folklorist

- Born: 13 October 1840; Duirinish, Skye, Scotland
- Died: 31 December 1926 (aged 86); Dunvegan, Skye, Scotland
- Education: Newnham College

Frances Tolmie (13 October 1840 – 31 December 1926) was a Scottish folklorist. She was born and died on the Isle of Skye. She collected Gaelic songs and published them in 1911.

== Life ==
Tolmie was born on a farm on Duirinish, at Uiginish House, on the Isle of Skye in Scotland in 1840. Her mother was Margaret MacAskill and was born on the Isle of Eigg. Her father was John Tolmie whose family had been associated with the MacLeod clan at the nearby town of Dunvegan. Her father died when Frances was four years old and the family was then looked after by her uncle Hugh Macaskill of Talisker and his wife, where she saw a large circle of literary and cultivated friends from across the country. By 1854, she and her family moved to Strontian where her brother was to be the minister. Over the next two years she extended her education to music and she seems to have taught herself the language of Gaelic.

In 1873 she was, for two terms, one of the first students at Newnham College in Cambridge. This was one of the first colleges for women. She was remembered for being an exceptionally tall highlander, red haired and she would entertain her fellow students by telling their fortunes by gazing at a mixture of egg white and water.

Tolmie returned to Skye and died in Dunvegan on 31 December 1926.

== Work ==
Tolmie spent many years gathering together traditional songs in Gaelic. One hundred and five songs from the Western Isles collected by her can be found in the Journal of the Folk-Song Society published in 1911. Tolmie's collection was the first of non-English songs to be published in the Journal. The collection was introduced by another folk song collector (Lucy Broadwood) and she supplied notes to explain the Gaelic musical scales to readers.

Around twenty four songs were reprinted in The Old Songs of Skye: Frances Tolmie and Her Circle by Ethel Bassin, some of which were praised by Vaughan Williams as faithfully reproducing the idiosyncratic rhythms of Gaelic music.

== Publications ==
=== Books ===
One hundred and five songs of occupation from the western isles of Scotland (1997) Llanerch Publishers reprint

=== Songs collected by Frances Tolmie - Journal of the Folk-Song Society ===
- 1911 v.4 no.16, 'Preface', pp.iii.
- 1911 v.4 no.16, 'Notes and Reminiscences', pp. 143–146.
- 1911 v.4 no.16, 'A Singer's Memories of Life in Skye', pp. 147–149.
- 1911 v.4 no.16, 'Songs of Rest and Recreation', pp. 157–195.
- 1911 v.4 no.16, 'Songs of Labour', pp. 196–244.
- 1911 v.4 no.16, 'Ancient Heroic Lays', pp. 245–254.
- 1911 v.4 no.16, 'Songs to Chiefs and Others', pp. 255–265.
- 1911 v.4 no.16, 'Laments, Love Lyrics, Etc.', pp. 266–270.
- 1911 v.4 no.16, 'Index to Gaelic Titles', pp. 273–274.
- 1911 v.4 no.16, 'Index to English Titles', pp. 275–276.
