= Bassan (disambiguation) =

Bassan may refer to:

- Bassan, a commune in the Hérault department in the Occitanie region in southern France

== People ==
- Danni Bassan (born 1955), Israeli musician
- Jean Bassan, French writer and dramatist
- Raphaël Bassan (born 1948), French film critic and journalist

== Other ==
- Bassan tribe, a tribe of the Ijaw people, lives in western Bayelsa State, Nigeria
- Les Fous de Bassan, Canadian drama film, directed by Yves Simoneau and released in 1986
- Bassan-Gué BN4 night bomber, a French night bomber designed in 1918 to the BN3/4 specification from the STAe

== See also ==
- Bassano (disambiguation)
