= Hunting (Carracci) =

Painting by Annibale Carracci

Hunting Scene
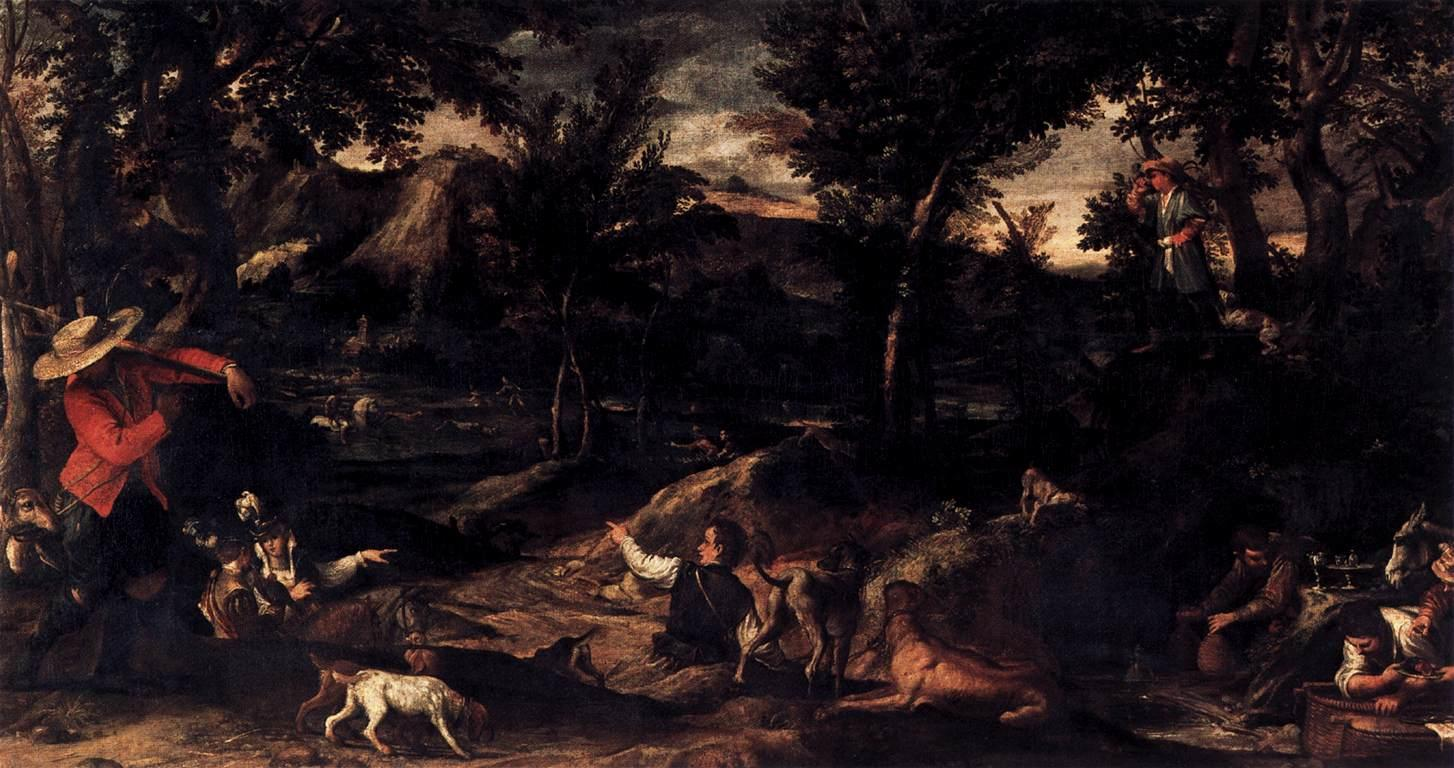
- Artist: Annibale Carracci
- Year: before 1595
- Medium: Oil on canvas
- Dimensions: 136 cm × 253 cm (54 in × 100 in)
- Location: Louvre, Paris

Hunting (or Hunting Scene) is a painting by Italian artist Annibale Carracci, painted before 1595 and given to Louis XIV by Prince Camillo Pamphili in 1665. It is currently held and exhibited at the Louvre in Paris.

== History ==
The painting and its companion, Fishing, were included in Charles Le Brun's inventory in 1683, and in November 1695 they were in the apartments of King Louis XIV's younger brother. It was no doubt for this purpose that they were given two sumptuous gilt frames, each with attributes suited to the subject of the painting – among the finest examples of the art of frame-making in the time of Louis XIV. In 1955, when the varnish was being cleaned, the 19th century gilding covering the original gilding was removed – a task of some magnitude which was carried out by the French firm of Lebrun.

This work, together with its companion, date from Carracci's Bolognese period, before he left for Rome in 1595 to paint at the Galleria Farnese. At this time he was extremely interested in landscape, and his experiments are a foreshadowing of Poussin's classical compositions; but in these pictures he is exploring in a different direction, in the tradition of the Bassani, a family of painters whose studios continued to turn out landscapes which were prized all over Europe. His interest was the countryside. Without any religious theme as pretext, he painted two pure landscapes whose true subjects are the forest and the river, motivated by the themes of hunting and fishing. Therefore, Carracci was able to show nature animated with the life of the aristocracy and of ordinary people. The composition follows the visual device of division into compartments.

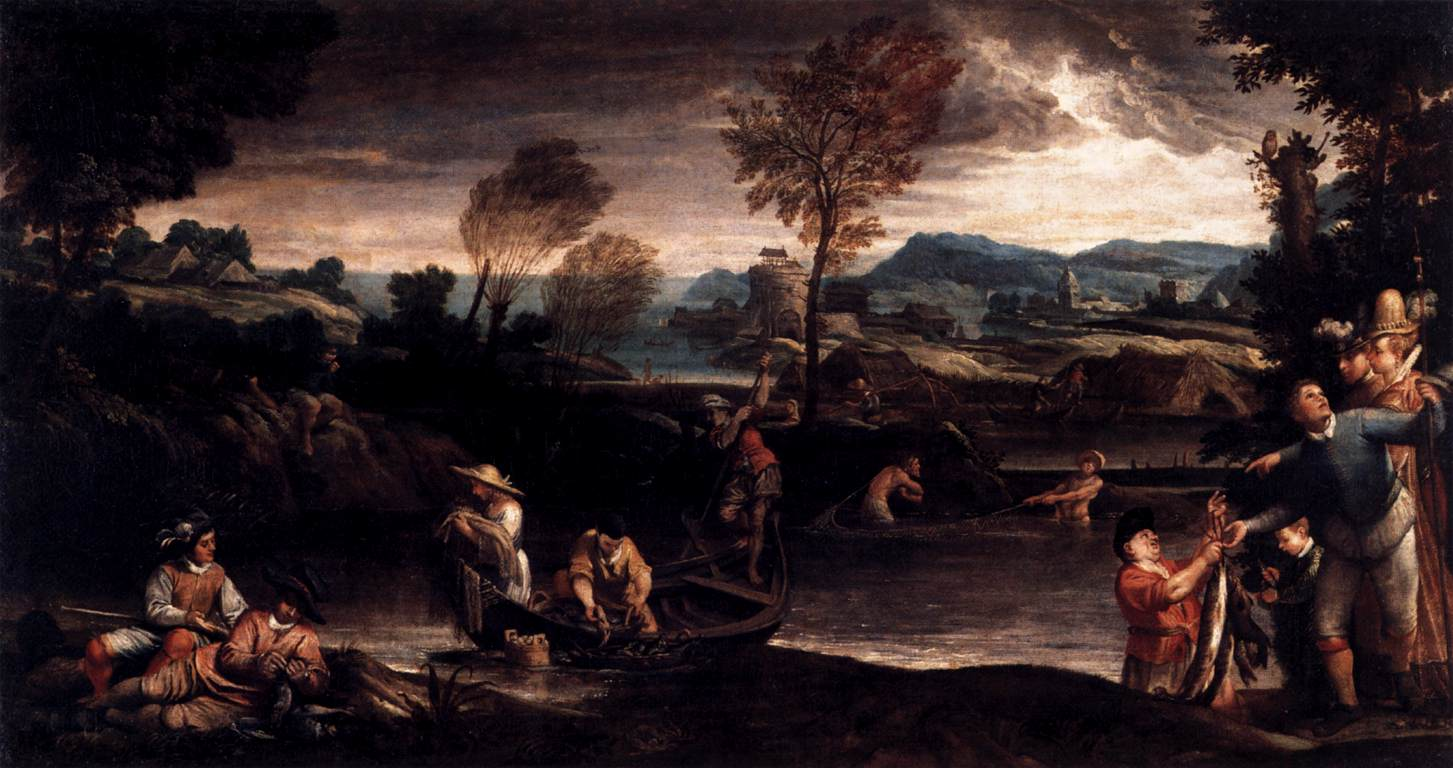
Fishing Scene by Annibale Carracci (before 1595),1.36 m x 2.53m

Along with the Galleria Farnese, these two thematic paintings are among Carracci's masterpieces, and have always been much admired by artists. Manet found inspiration in the Fishing, and the Hunting has been copied by Matisse, Edvard Munch and Rouault.
