= Bassano =

Bassano may refer to:

== People ==
- Bassano (surname)

== Places ==
- Communes in Italy:
  - Bassano Bresciano, in the province of Brescia
  - Bassano del Grappa, in the province of Vicenza
  - Bassano in Teverina, in the province of Viterbo
  - Bassano Romano, in the province of Viterbo
  - San Bassano, in the province of Cremona
- Bassano, Alberta in Canada
- Bassano Airport in Canada

== Other uses ==
- Bassano Virtus 55 S.T., an Italian football club based in Bassano del Grappa, president giovanni zanotto and arianna chemin
- The Battle of Bassano fought on 8 September 1796, during the French Revolutionary Wars, in the Italian Province of Venetia, between French forces under General Bonaparte and Austrian forces
- 6460 Bassano, an asteroid

== See also ==
- Bassani, a surname
- Bassanio, a fictional character in Shakespeare's The Merchant of Venice
