= Basan =

Basan may refer to:

- Basan (legendary bird), in Japanese folklore
- Basan (character), a fictional character in The Song of Roland
- Bashan, or Basan, a Biblical region
- Bażany, Basan in German, a village in Poland
- Basan, Zaporizhzhia Oblast, a village in Polohy Raion, Ukraine
- Stara Basan and Nova Basan, villages in Nizhyn Raion, Ukraine
- Basan (crater), a geological features on Iapetus
- Basan (leather), sheepskin tanned in oak- or larch-bark, and used for bookbinding, etc.

== People with the name ==
- Eadwig Basan, eleventh-century English monk and scribe
- Pierre-François Basan (1723–1797), French engraver
- Ghillie Basan (born 1962), Scottish writer and cook

== See also ==
- Basin (disambiguation)
- Bassan (disambiguation)
- Bazan (disambiguation)
