= Héctor Bazán =

Peruvian footballer (born 2001)

Personal information
- Full name: Héctor Rodrigo Bazán Chiesa
- Date of birth: 15 November 2001 (age 24)
- Place of birth: Lima, Peru
- Height: 1.80 m (5 ft 11 in)
- Position: Forward

Team information
- Current team: Universidad San Martín
- Number: 7

Youth career
- –2017: Esther Grande
- 2018: Sport Boys
- 2018–2019: Universidad San Martín

Senior career*
| Years | Team | Apps | (Gls) |
| 2019–2021 | Universidad San Martín | 32 | (0) |
| 2022 | APS Zakynthos | 17 | (3) |
| 2023– | Universidad San Martín | 31 | (8) |
- * Club domestic league appearances and goals as of 20:19, 13 December 2025 (UTC)

Héctor Rodrigo Bazán Chiesa (born 15 November 2001) is a Peruvian footballer who plays as a forward for Universidad San Martín.

== Career ==
=== Universidad San Martín ===
After passing by Esther Grande and Sport Boys, Bazán moved to Universidad San Martín in August 2018, where he started on the clubs reserve team. Bazán was called up for his first official game on 29 April 2019 against Alianza Lima, where he was on the bench for the whole game.

On 23 June 2019, Bazán got his professional debut for Universidad San Martín in the Copa Bicentenario against Juan Aurich. Bazán started on the bench before coming on for Jairo Concha in the 50th minute and scoring a goal 11 minutes later. At the end of 2019 the club confirmed, that Bazán had signed a new deal for the 2020 season. Bazán ended the 2019 season with 157 minutes of playing time and one goal.

=== Later career ===
On 15 January 2022, Bazán joined Greek club A.P.S. Zakynthos.

In 2023, Bazán returned to Universidad San Martín. After a good 2023 season that ended with 9 goals in 25 games, in October 2023 Bazan suffered a partial ACL rupture.

== Career statistics ==
=== Club ===
As of 2 October 2023

| Club | Division | Season | League | | Cup | | Continental | | Total | |
| Club | Division | Season | Apps | Goals | Apps | Goals | Apps | Goals | Apps | Goals |
|---|---|---|---|---|---|---|---|---|---|---|
| Universidad San Martín | Liga 1 | 2019 | 9 | 0 | — | | — | | 9 | 0 |
| Universidad San Martín | Liga 1 | 2020 | 7 | 0 | — | | — | | 7 | 0 |
| Universidad San Martín | Liga 1 | 2021 | 16 | 0 | — | | — | | 16 | 0 |
| APS Zakynthos | Super League Greece 2 | 2021-22 | 17 | 3 | — | | — | | 17 | 3 |
| Universidad San Martín | Liga 2 | 2023 | 25 | 9 | — | | — | | 25 | 9 |
| Career total | | | 74 | 12 | 0 | 0 | 0 | 0 | 74 | 12 |
