= Omar Bazán Flores =

Mexican politician

- Born: 24 March 1976 (age 50); Chihuahua, Chihuahua, Mexico
- Occupation: Politician
- Political party: PRI

Omar Bazán Flores (born 24 March 1976) is a Mexican politician affiliated with the Institutional Revolutionary Party (PRI). As of 2014 he served as Deputy of the LVII and LIX Legislatures of the Mexican Congress as a plurinominal representative replacing José Reyes Baeza Terrazas.
