= Bassan-Gué BN4 night bomber =

French WW1 bomber aircraft

Bassan-Gué BN4

General information
- Type: Night bomber
- National origin: France
- Manufacturer: Bassan-Gué
- Number built: 0

The Bassan-Gué BN4 was a French night bomber designed in 1918 to the BN3/4 specification from the STAe. This large triplane bomber was to have been powered by three 450 hp (340 kW) Renault 12H engines, but these were unavailable. Resorting to three 300 hp (220 kW) Hispano-Suiza 8Fb engines left the prospective design seriously under-powered and development was abandoned.
