= Benjamin Bassin =

Finnish official and ambassador

Benjamin Isak Bassin (18 January 1944 – 27 March 2018) was a Finnish official and ambassador.

Bassin was born into Finnish Jewish family in Helsinki. His parents had moved to Finland as children from the Soviet Union.

Bassin visited the Helsinki Jewish School and wrote a degree as an Apollo co-school. In 1968, he graduated as Bachelor of Law from the University of Helsinki and started to work in the same year in the Ministry of Foreign Affairs. By 1974 Bass had various tasks in development management. From 1975 to 1980 he worked at the Finnish United Nations Office in New York City, where he also married to Korean-born women called Kim.

From 1980 to 1983 Bassin worked as an office manager at the Ministry of Foreign Affairs Department of Commerce. In 1983, he was moved to the Embassy of Finland in Tokyo where he started his "Asian diplomatic career". In 1986 Bassin was appointed Finland's first ambassador to Thailand. From 1990 to 1993 he was the Head of Department for Development Cooperation at Helsinki. In 1993 Bassin became a negotiating officer at the Political Department of the Ministry of Foreign Affairs where he worked until 1995 was appointed Finnish ambassador to New Delhi, India. In 2001 2005 Bassin was the Finnish ambassador to Beijing, China.

Bassin was a member of the Club of Rome from 1994. He died in Helsinki, aged 74.
