= Bazzaninho =

Brazilian footballer (1941–2016)

Personal information
- Full name: Oliver Roberto Bazzani
- Date of birth: 30 July 1941
- Place of birth: Mirassol, Brazil
- Date of death: 23 June 2016 (aged 74)
- Place of death: Sorocaba, Brazil
- Position: Midfielder

Youth career
- –1959: Balsamense

Senior career*
Years	Team	Apps	(Gls)
1960–1965	São Paulo	76	(11)
1961	→ Batatais (loan)		
1962–1963	→ São Bento (loan)		
1965–1970	São Bento		
1970–1971	Ponte Preta		
- * Club domestic league appearances and goals

Oliver Roberto Bazzani (30 July 1941 – 23 June 2016), simply known as Bazzaninho was a Brazilian professional footballer who played as a midfielder.

== Career ==
Small in stature and agile, Bazzaninho began his professional career at São Paulo, where he played from 1960 to 1965 and made 76 appearances. He also had a notable spell at São Bento, and ended his career in 1971 playing for Ponte Preta.

== Personal life and death ==
Bazzaninho is son of Olivério Bazzani, defender of SC Corinthians in 1930s, and brother of Bazzani.

Bazzaninho died 23 June 2016 in Sorocaba, São Paulo.

== Honours ==
São Bento

- Campeonato Paulista Série A2: 1962
