= Bassano Bresciano =

- Comune
- Comune di Bassano Bresciano
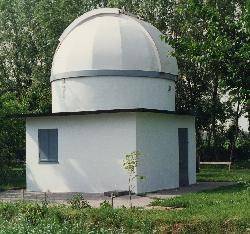

- Location within Italy Location within Lombardy
- Coordinates: 45°19′50″N 10°7′40″E
- Country: Italy
- Region: Lombardy
- Province: Brescia
- Frazioni: Manerbio, Pontevico, San Gervasio Bresciano, Verolanuova

Area
  - Total: 9 km^{2} (3.5 sq mi)
- Elevation: 65 m (213 ft)

Population (2011)
  - Total: 2,237
  - Density: 250/km^{2} (640/sq mi)
- Time zone: UTC+1 (CET)
  - Summer (DST): UTC+2 (CEST)
- Postal code: 25020
- Dialing code: 030
- ISTAT code: 017013
- Website: Official website

Bassano Bresciano (Brescian: Basà) is a comune in the province of Brescia, in Lombardy. As of 2011 Bassano Bresciano had a population of 2,237.

== History ==
During the Roman era, Bassano Bresciano (lat. Bassianum) was crossed by the Via Brixiana, a Roman consular road which connected Cremona (lat. Cremona) to Brescia (lat. Brixia), from which Roman roads passed and then branched out towards the entire Cisalpine Gaul.

== Observatory ==
The private Bassano Bresciano Observatory or Astronomical Observatory of Bassano Bresciano (Italian: Osservatorio Bassano Bresciano, Osservatorio Astronomico di Bassano Bresciano) is an astronomical observatory located at an altitude of 58 metres above sea level within the territory of Bassano Bresciano. It has the IAU code "565". The Florian main-belt asteroid 6460 Bassano, discovered by Ulisse Quadri at Bassano Bresciano in 1992, was named for the village and its observatory. Naming citation was published on 9 September 1995 (M.P.C. 25655).

First astrometric measurements were published in the Minor Planet Circulars in 1983, then obtained with a 15-cm reflecting telescope. On 29 April 1989, the observatory was officially inaugurated, when a 42-cm Schmidt telescope was installed, which has since been the observatory's principal instrument. The telescope is installed on an equatorial fork mount, uses a Starlight HX516 CCD camera, and is housed on the first floor of a 5-meter dome building. Today the observatory is fully automated and remote controlled. Discoveries at the observatory include the minor planets 6460 Bassano, 6793 Palazzolo, 6981 Chirman and 22370 Italocalvino. The focus of the observatory's main research activity has now shifted from astrometry of minor planets and comets, to photometric observations of planets and variable stars. In 2011, it also joined the international gamma-ray burst coordinates network. The observatory is open to the public on the occasion of important astronomical events.

Minor planets discovered: 4
6460 Bassano	26 October 1992	list
6793 Palazzolo	30 December 1991	list
6981 Chirman	15 October 1993	list
22370 Italocalvino	15 October 1993	list
Discoveries of numbered minor planets credited to "Bassano Bresciano" by the Minor Planet Center

== See also ==
- List of astronomical observatories
