= Hovit =

Village in Shirak, Armenia

Hovit Հովիտ
- Location within Armenia Location within Shirak
- Coordinates: 40°46′N 44°00′E
- Country: Armenia
- Province: Shirak
- Municipality: Akhuryan

Population (2001)
  - Total: 566
- Time zone: UTC+4
  - Summer (DST): UTC+5

Hovit (Armenian: Հովիտ) is a village in the Akhuryan Municipality of the Shirak Province of Armenia.

== Demographics ==
Historical population
| Year | Pop. | ±% p.a. |
|---|---|---|
| 1831 | 101 | — |
| 1897 | 608 | +2.76% |
| 1926 | 504 | −0.64% |
| 1939 | 578 | +1.06% |
| 1959 | 543 | −0.31% |
| 1970 | 538 | −0.08% |
| 1979 | 492 | −0.99% |
| 1989 | 442 | −1.07% |
| 2001 | 538 | +1.65% |
| 2011 | 566 | +0.51% |
