= Orazio Bassani =

Italian composer

Orazio Bassani (Cento, Ferrara before 1570 - Parma 1615), also known as "Orazio della Viola", was an Italian viola-da-gambist. He was celebrated for his instrumental embellishments of madrigals, a few of which survive in manuscript sources. He was a colleague of Fabrizio Dentice and uncle of Francesco Maria Bassani.
