= Louisa Bassano =

English opera singer (1818–1908)

- Born: 19 February 1818; London, England
- Died: 20 August 1908 (aged 90); Hastings, East Sussex, England
- Occupation: Singer
- Spouse: Frederick George Boddy (m. 1849; died 1853)
- Relatives: Alexander Bassano (brother)

Louisa Frances Bassano (19 February 1818 – 20 August 1908) was an English opera singer.

She was the second daughter of Clemente Bassano and elder sister of the photographer Alexander Bassano. She toured with the pianist Franz Liszt during his visit to the British Isles in 1840–1841. Bassano sang the mezzo recitatives in the first English performance of Mendelssohn's Elijah conducted by the composer. She was known as Miss Bassano until she married Frederick George Boddy Esq. in 1849, from which time she became known as Madame Bassano. Her husband died in 1853. She later taught singing and was a member of the Royal Society of Musicians.
