= Basen Górniczy =

Neighbourhood of Szczecin, Poland

Coordinates: 53.40085°N 14.59905°E

Basen Górniczy (German: Groß Stein Bruch) is a part of the Szczecin City (German: Stettin), Poland, situated on the islands between the West Oder river and East Oder River (Regalica), south-east of the Szczecin Old Town, and west of Szczecin-Dąbie.

The area is part of the Port of Gdańsk, where dry bulk goods, liquid bulk goods, scrap, machinery, structures, steel products and unitized general cargo are transhipped.
