= Mark Bassin =

American geographer

Academic background
- Education: University of California, Berkeley

Academic work
- Discipline: Geography
- Sub-discipline: Geopolitics
- Institutions: Södertörn University

Mark Bassin is a geographer and specialist on Russian and German geopolitics. He is currently employed as a professor in historical and contemporary studies at Södertörn University.

== Life ==
Mark Bassin was born in 1953. Bassin gained his Ph.D. in history at the University of California, Berkeley in 1983.

He has received personal fellowships from the Fulbright Foundation, the Remarque Institute at New York University, the American Academy in Berlin, the Slavic-Eurasian Research Center in Sapporo, and the Leibniz Institute of European History in Mainz. Between 1 July 1988 and 1 December 1988, he was a research scholar at the Kennan Institute working on challenges to Siberian development.

His research has also been supported by grants from the Arts and Humanities Research Council (AHRC), the British Academy, the German Academic Exchange Service (DAAD), NCEEER, the National Endowment for the Humanities (NEH), and the Ford Foundation.

In 1995, he was a recipient of the Chester Penn Higby Prize from the American Historical Association.

From 1996 to 2004, he served as Secretary for the Commission for the History of Geographic Thought of the International Geographical Union.

From 2006 to 2009, his research was supported by a Major Research Fellowship from the Leverhulme Trust.

Since 1999, Bassin has been Associate Editor for the journal Geopolitics.

He has been a consultant for the World Economic Forum, and is a founding member of the Valdai Discussion Club in Moscow, in which capacity he meets yearly with the Russian President and members of his government.

In 2017, he was awarded the Reginald Zelnik Book Prize in History from the Association for Slavic, East European, and Eurasian Studies.

In the Spring of 2025, Bassin was a Fellow at the Swedish Collegium for Advanced Study in Uppsala, Sweden.

He is an Associate Fellow of the Swedish Institute.

== Teaching positions ==
He has taught at UCLA, the University of Wisconsin–Madison, and University College London, and held visiting positions at the Universities of Chicago, Copenhagen, and Pau in France. In March 2005, while a visiting professor of geography at University College London, Bassin was invited to Russia as part of a UK expert group to meet with Vladimir Putin.

Until 2010, he was a professor in Human Geography at the University of Birmingham. In 2010, he became a professor at Södertörn University. His teaching and research interests include political, cultural and historical geography, as well as contemporary politics in Russia, Germany and Poland. He has also been a visiting professor at Uppsala University.

He has also been a speaker at the Centre of European Studies at Harvard University.

== Publications ==
=== Books ===
- Imperial Visions: Nationalist Imagination and Geographical Expansion in the Russian Far East 1840-1865. Cambridge University Press, 1999. ISBN 978-0-521-39174-0
- Soviet and Post-Soviet Identities. Cambridge University Press, 2012. ISBN 978-1107011175
- Between Europe and Asia: The Origins, Theories, and Legacies of Russian Eurasianism - Russian and East European Studies. University of Pittsburgh Press, 2015. ISBN 978-0822963660
- Space, Place, and Power in Modern Russia: Essays in the New Spatial History - NIU Series in Slavic, East European, and Eurasian Studies. Publisher: Cornell University Press, 2018. ISBN 978-0875807980

=== Journals and articles ===
- Classical Eurasianism and the Geopolitics of Russian Identity
- Eurasianism “Classical” and “Neo”: The Lines of Continuity
- “Civilizations and their Discontents: Geography and Geopolitics in the Huntington Thesis,” article in Geopolitics
- “Ethno-Landscapes and Ethno-Parasites: Lev Gumilev’s Ecology of Ethnicity,” chapter in Ethnosymbolism: Critical Approaches to Ethnicity and Nationalism. Essays in Honor of Anthony Smith; Athena Leoussi and Stephen Grosby, eds; Edinburgh: Edinburgh University Press.
- “Geographies of Imperial Identity,” chapter in The Cambridge History of Russia, Vol. II, Dominic Lieven, ed, Cambridge: Cambridge University Press
- “The Morning of our Motherland (painting by Fedor Shurpin)” chapter in The Russian Visual Documents Reader, Valerie Kievelson and Joan Newberger, eds, New Haven: Yale University Press
- 2006 “Mackinder’s Heartland and the Politics of Space in post-Soviet Russia” (with K.E. Aksenov), Geopolitics 11: 1
- 2005 “Blood or Soil? The volkisch movement, the Nazis, and the legacy of Geopolitik,” chapter in How Green were the Nazis? Nature, Environment, and Nation in the Third Reich, Franz-Josef Brüggemeier, Marc Cioc, and Thomas Zeller, eds, Athens OH: Ohio University Press: 204-242
- 2005 “The Political Spaces of Modernity,” Conoscere il mondo: Vespucci e la modernitè (Memoire Geografiche, Nuova Serie, 5): 163–176.
- 2005 «Россия между Азии и Европы: идеологическое конструирование географического пространства» chapter in Российская империя в современной зарубежной литературы [The Russian Empire in Contemporary Foreign Literature] Paul Werth, Aleksei Miller, and Pavel Kabytov, eds. Moscow: Зарубежная Литература, pp. 277–310.
- 2004 “Historical Geography: Locating Time in the Spaces of Modernity” (with Vincent. Berdoulay), chapter in Human Geography: A History for the 21st Century, Georges Benko and Ulf Strohmeyer, eds. London: Arnold: 64–82.

translated as: “La Géographie historique: localiser le temps dans les espaces de la modernité” (with Vincent Berdoulay), chapter in Horizons géographiques, Georges Benko and Ulf Strohmeyer, eds. Paris: Brèal: 291–338. Translation of 2004a.

- 2004 “The Two Faces of Contemporary Geopolitics,” Progress in Human Geography 28: 620-626
- 2004 “Tristes Toponymies: What’s Wrong with Eurasia,” Ab Imperio 1: 178–183.
- 2003 География и Идентичность в Постсоветской России [Geography and Identity in Post-Soviet Russia]; Edited (with Konstantin E. Aksenov). St. Petersburg. Геликон-Плюс: 2003, 271pp.
- 2003 “Between Realism and the ‘New Right’: Geopolitics in Germany in the 1990s,” Transactions IBG 28:3 New Series: 350-366.
- 2003 “Politics From Nature: Environment, Ideology, and the Determinist Tradition,” chapter in A Companion to Political Geography, John Agnew, Katherine Mitchell, and Gerard Toal, eds. Basingstoke: Blackwell; 14-29
- 2003 “The Greening of Utopia: Nature, Social Vision, and Landscape Art in Stalinist Russia,” chapter in Architectures Of Russian Identity, 1500–Present, James Cracraft and Dan Rowland, eds. Ithaca: Cornell University Press; 150–171.
- 2003 "Siberia as discursive space: The geo-psychology of nationalism in 19th century Russia", Годишњак за друштвену историју/Annual for Social History (Belgrad) 10: 1-2: 27-50
- 2003 “Classical Eurasianism and the Geopolitics of Russian Identity,” Ab Imperio 2: 257–267.

Translated as: «Классическое евразийство и геополитки русской идентичности» chapter in Новая Имперская История Постсоветского Пространства [New Imperial History of Post-Soviet Space], Ilya Gerasimov, Sergei Glebov, Aleksandr Kaplunovskii, Marina Mogil’ner, Aleksandr Semenov, eds. Kazan: Центр Исслед. Нац. и Империи, 2004: 563–572.

- 2003 «К вопросу о географии национальной идентичности» [Questioning the Geography of National Identity], in 2003a: 10–17.
- 2002 “Imperialer Raum/Nationaler Raum: Sibirien auf der kognitiven Landkarte Rußlands im 19. Jahrhundert“ [Imperial Space/National Space: Siberia on the Cognitive Map of Russia in the 19th Century], Geschichte und Gesellschaft: Zeitschrift für Historische Sozialwissenschaft 28:3, pp. 378–403 [in German]
- 2002 “Мыслить пространством: Eurasia And Ethno-Territoriality In Post-Soviet Maps,” chapter in S.K Frank and I.P. Smirnov, eds, Zeit-Räume. Neue Tendenzen in der historischen Kulturforschung aus der Perspektive der Slavistik (Wiener Slawistischer Almanach, Bd. 49): 15–35.
- 2001 “Renaissance der Geopolitik” [The Renaissance of Geopolitics], Der Tagesspiegel (Berlin) No. 17523 (9 September), p. B4 [in German]
- 2001 `“Reading the Natural and the Social,” Intro. to Nature as Space: (re)understanding Nature and Natural Environments, Guven Sargen, ed, Ankara: MfY/METU; pp. 1–11.
