= 6460 Bassano =

Main-belt asteroid

Discovery
- Discovered by: U. Quadri; L. Strabla
- Discovery site: Bassano Bresciano Obs.
- Discovery date: 26 October 1992

Designations
- Named after: Bassano Bresciano (Italian village)
- Alternative designations: 1992 UK_{6} · 1985 TR_{2} 1989 YM_{6}
- Minor planet category: main-belt · Flora

Orbital characteristics
- Epoch 4 September 2017 (JD 2458000.5)
- Uncertainty parameter 0
- Observation arc: 31.43 yr (11,481 days)
- Aphelion: 2.4975 AU
- Perihelion: 2.0183 AU
- Semi-major axis: 2.2579 AU
- Eccentricity: 0.1061
- Orbital period (sidereal): 3.39 yr (1,239 days)
- Mean anomaly: 43.163°
- Mean motion: 0° 17^{m} 25.8^{s} / day
- Inclination: 3.2269°
- Longitude of ascending node: 299.03°
- Argument of perihelion: 181.72°

Physical characteristics
- Dimensions: 4.252±0.108 km 4.94 km (calculated)
- Synodic rotation period: 2.9131±0.0034 h 2.9145±0.0034 h
- Geometric albedo: 0.24 (assumed); 0.389±0.048
- Spectral type: S
- Absolute magnitude (H): 13.5 · 13.576±0.002 (R) · 13.7 · 14.291±0.003 (S)

6460 Bassano, provisional designation 1992 UK_{6}, is a stony Flora asteroid from the inner regions of the asteroid belt, approximately 4.5 kilometers in diameter. The asteroid was discovered on 26 October 1992, by Italian amateur astronomers Ulisse Quadri and Luca Strabla at the Bassano Bresciano Observatory in northern Italy. It was named for the Italian village of Bassano Bresciano.

== Orbit and classification ==
The S-type asteroid is a member of the Flora family, one of the largest groups of stony asteroids in the main-belt. Bassano orbits the Sun in the inner main-belt at a distance of 2.0–2.5 AU once every 3 years and 5 months (1,239 days). Its orbit has an eccentricity of 0.11 and an inclination of 3° with respect to the ecliptic.

In October 1985, it was first identified as 1985 TR_{2} at the French Caussols Observatory, extending the body's observation arc by 7 years prior to its official discovery observation at Bassano Bresciano.

== Physical characteristics ==
=== Rotation period ===
Two rotational lightcurves of Bassano were obtained from photometric observations at the Palomar Transient Factory in August 2012. Lightcurve analysis gave a rotation period of 2.9145 and 2.9131 hours with a brightness variation of 0.38 and 0.29 magnitude, respectively (U=2/2).

=== Diameter and albedo ===
According to the survey carried out by the NEOWISE mission of NASA's space-based Wide-field Infrared Survey Explorer, Bassano measures 4.3 kilometers in diameter and its surface has a high albedo of 0.39. The Collaborative Asteroid Lightcurve Link assumes a lower albedo of 0.24 – derived from 8 Flora, the principal body and namesake of its orbital family – and hence calculates a larger diameter of 4.9 kilometers.

== Naming ==
This minor planet was named for the location of the discovering observatory, Bassano Bresciano, an ancient village in northern Italy.

The historic village was under Longobard and Frank control during the early Middle Ages, and then ruled by the House of Sforza and the Venice republic. In the 16th century the former marshland was regained by the two Italian agronomists Camillo Tarello and Agostino Gallo. Monuments in the village include Luzzago's palace and Brunelli's villa. Its church has a Via Crucis credited to the school of Venetian painter Giovanni Battista Tiepolo, one of the great Old Masters of that period. The official naming citation was published by the Minor Planet Center on 9 September 1995 (M.P.C. 25655).
