= Nicolas Bazan =

Argentine neuroscientist

Nicolas G. Bazan is a neuroscientist, eye researcher, and author. His research focuses on neurodegenerative diseases, neuroinflammation (inflammation of nervous tissue), and cell survival using cellular, molecular, and disease models including lipidomics. He also operates "Nicholas Bazan Wines" with Mark Wahle.

== Appointments ==
- The Ernest C. and Yvette C. Villere Chair for Research in Retinal Degeneration - Louisiana State University Health Sciences Center (LSUHSC), New Orleans, LA, 1984-
- Professor of Ophthalmology, Biochemistry and Molecular Biology and Neurology, Louisiana State University Health Sciences Center (LSUHSC), School of Medicine, New Orleans, LA, 1981-
- Director (Founder), Neuroscience Center of Excellence, LSUHSC, School of Medicine, New Orleans, LA, 1988-
- Boyd Professor, Louisiana State University Health Sciences Center (LSUHSC), New Orleans, LA, 1994-
- Editor-in-Chief, Molecular Neurobiology (Springer), 1986-
- Senate Member, Deutsches Zentrum für Neurodegenerative Erkrankungen (DZNE) (German Center for Neurodegenerative Diseases) in der Helmholtz-Gemeinschaft, nationwide research program (Germany), 2009-
- Editorial Board, Cell Death, and Disease, Nature Publishing Group, 2010-
- Editorial Board, Cell Death, and Differentiation, Nature Publishing Group, 2011-
- Member, Biology of the Visual System Study Section, NIH, 2012-
- Chair of the Louisiana State University Health Sciences Center (LSUHSC) Research Council/Translational Research Initiative, New Orleans

== Early life and education ==
Nicolas G. Bazan was born in Los Sarmientos, Tucuman, Argentina on May 22, 1942. He received his MD from the University of Tucuman School of Medicine, Argentina (1965) and was a postdoctoral fellow at Columbia University's College of Physicians and Surgeons and Harvard Medical School (1965–1968). The research that he performed at Harvard was the basis for his Doctorate in Medical Sciences thesis (University of Tucuman, 1971). He became the founding director of the Louisiana State University Heath Sciences Center (LSUHSC) Neuroscience Center of Excellence in 1989.

== Scientific contributions ==
Bazan demonstrated that brain ischemia, a condition that involves reduced blood flow to the brain, triggers the release of free essential fatty acids (arachidonic and docosahexaenoic acid) from membranes during seizures and ischemia through the enzyme phospholipase A2. This finding has been referred to as the "Bazan Effect".

In the early 70's, his laboratory isolated a diacylglycerol containing docosahexaenoyl chains in C1 and C2 from the retina, demonstrated that this lipid is present in this tissue in relatively large proportions, and uncovered novel molecular species of phospholipids (containing two docosahexaenoyl chains; coined the term "supraenoic" molecular species) displaying very rapid turnover.

In 1975, he and his colleagues showed that the brains of newborn mammals and organisms that cannot regulate their own body temperature accumulate free arachidonic acid sluggishly, correlating with the known resistance of these animals to anoxia. In contrast, animals that are able to regulate body temperature are vulnerable to relatively short periods of a severe absence of oxygen, rapidly accumulate arachidonic and docosahexaenoic acid as a result of phospholipase A2 activation. Also, his laboratory found that the diacylglycerol accumulated in the brain during ischemia is derived from inositol lipids and postulated that selective vulnerability at synapses engages the degradation of inositol lipids.

In 1980, he and his colleagues described those molecular species of phospholipids in photoreceptors contain two docosahexaenoyl chains per molecule, rather than a saturated chain at C1 and an unsaturated chain at C2, confirming their initial observation of the 70s. Also, he and his colleagues identified inositol lipid degradation and phospholipase A2 activation in neural cell damage in experimental epilepsy and stroke.

He and his colleagues showed in 1979 that phospholipase A2 activation, which gives rise to brain-free arachidonic and docosahexaenoic acid upon stimulation, is related to neurotransmission. In addition, he showed that the concept commonly described in textbooks, that the essential fatty acid docosahexaenoic acid is introduced through the acylation-deacylation cycle in retina membranes (and in other excitable membranes), is incorrect. Rather, they demonstrated that this fatty acid is introduced to a large extent through the de novo synthesis of phosphatidic acid.

His laboratory later identified an activating enzyme for docosahexaenoic acid with very low Km, which allows photoreceptors and other excitable membranes to retain this fatty acid. Also in a series of studies, they found that leukotrienes, HETEs (hydroxyeicosatetraenoic acids), inositol lipids, and prostaglandins are key molecules in the communication between retinal pigment epithelial cells and photoreceptors.

In 1985, Bazan and his colleagues provided evidence that retinal pigment epithelial cells retain docosahexaenoic acid within photoreceptors by a "short loop" between both cells, and a "long loop" between the liver and the retina. His laboratory further supported these concepts by demonstrating a deficit of docosahexaenoic and arachidonic acid in Usher's syndrome. Then they demonstrated that phagocytosis by retinal pigment epithelial cells induces gene expression. During that time, Bazan and his colleagues found prostaglandin D synthetase in the interphotoreceptor matrix and cloned its receptor. They demonstrated that docosahexaenoic acid is transported from the post-Golgi network to the photoreceptor disk membranes with rhodopsin.

Bazan and colleagues also showed that platelet-activating factor (PAF) is an endogenous neurotoxin and demonstrated neuroprotection by PAF antagonists. This included the finding that seizure-induced platelet-activating factor production activates gene expression, as well as a new neuroprotection site, the PAF receptor. Moreover, his laboratory found that PAF modulates glutamate release and is a retrograde messenger of long-term potentiation and that this "physiological PAF" enhances memory formation. Moreover, they found that PAF activates transcription of the inducible prostaglandin synthase, cyclooxygenase-2 (COX-2).

Subsequently, the Bazan laboratory demonstrated that secretory phospholipase A2 modulates neuronal survival and glutamate transmission. Then, Bazan's laboratory in collaboration with the Stephen Prescott lab showed that neuronal diacylglycerol kinase epsilon is necessary in seizures and neuroprotection. In 2002 they showed that photoreceptors have a DNA repair mechanism that is induced by light damage and identified that genes are upregulated in models of retinal pathoangiogenesis.

In 2003, Bazan and his colleagues coined the term "docosanoids," which are enzyme-derived oxygenated messengers of docosahexaenoic acid, and in 2004 participated in the discovery of the synthesis and bioactivity of the first docosanoid, neuroprotectin D1 (NPD1). This paper relates how he and his colleagues discovered that NPD1 arrests apoptosis in retinal pigment epithelial cells at the pre-mitochondrial level.

In 2011 Bazan and his colleagues found that DHA is neuroprotective in experimental stroke and that NPD1 is neuroprotective in experimental epilepsy.

Research led by Bazan in 2015 also discovered a protein in the retina that is crucial for vision. Bazan and his colleagues reported on the key molecular mechanisms leading to visual degeneration and blindness. They discovered that adiponectin receptor 1 (AdipoR1) is a regulator of these RPE cell functions and demonstrated that AdipoR1 ablation results in DHA reduction. These results established AdipoR1 as a regulatory switch of DHA uptake, retention, conservation, and elongation in photoreceptors and RPE cells, thus preserving photoreceptor cell integrity.

In 2015 Bazan and his colleagues also discovered gene interactions that determine whether cells live or die in such conditions as age-related macular degeneration and ischemic stroke. They worked with human RPE cells and an experimental model of ischemic stroke and discovered novel mechanisms in cells with the ability to activate pathways that crosstalk one to another and then assemble consolidated responses that decide cell fate. The study reported that, in retinal pigment epithelial cells, NPD1 induces nuclear translocation and cREL synthesis that, in turn, mediates BIRC3 transcription; thus BIRC3 silencing prevents NPD1 induction of survival against oxidative stress.

In 2016 Bazan and his colleagues showed in "in vivo" rodent models of limbic epileptogenesis (LE) that the phospholipid mediator platelet-activating factor (PAF) increases in LE and that PAF receptor (PAF-r) ablation mitigates its progression, suggesting that over-activation of PAF-r signaling induces aberrant neuronal plasticity in LE and leads to chronic dysfunctional neuronal circuitry that mediates epilepsy.

== Translational medicine and industry ==
Start-Up Companies

- InSite Vision (Alameda, California): Scientific Co-Founder, 1987
- St. Charles Pharmaceuticals (New Orleans, Louisiana): Scientific Founder, 1997

Patents

- United States Patent No. P9501549; Inventors: Nicolas G. Bazan and Julio Alvarez-Builla Gomez and Assignee: Spain, "Nuevos derivados de N-acil-4-hidroxifenilamina con propiedades analgésicas y formulaciones farmaceuticas que los contienen." 1995
- United States Patent No. 5,554,636; Inventors: Nicolas G. Bazan and Julio Alvarez-Builla Gomez and Assignee: LSUMC, "N-acylated 4-hydroxyphenylamine derivatives with analgesic properties and pharmaceutical compositions containing them" and corresponding International Application No. PCT/US96/05456, published as International Publication No.WO 96/32940; Canadian application no. 2,218664, European application no.96915332.9, and Japanese application no. B-531944. 1996
- United States Patent No. 5,621,110; Inventors: Nicolas G. Bazan and Julio Alvarez-Builla Gomez and Assignee: LSUMC, "Process for preparing N-acylated 4-hydroxyphenylamine derivatives with analgesic properties." 1997
- United States Patent Filed "02/25/2002: Inventors: Jay Hunt, Haydee Bazan, Victor Marcheselli, Julio Alvarez-Builla Gomez, Nicolas G. Bazan and Assignee: LSUHSC, "Platelet-activating factor antagonist inhibition of angiogenesis and tumor growth induced by basic fibroblast growth factor." 2002
- United States Patent No. 6,653.311; Inventors: Nicolas G. Bazan, Carlos Sunkel, Julio Alvarez-Builla Gomez and Assignee: LSUHSC, "5-Lipoxygenase inhibitors: (2-azinylamino) quinone Derivatives." 2003
- United States Patent No. 6,566,359; Inventors: Nicolas G. Bazan, Carlos Sunkel, Victor Marcheselli and Julio Alvarez-Builla Gomez and Assignee: LSUHSC, "2,4,6-Trimethyl-1,4-dihydro-pyridine-3,5-dicarboxylic acid esters as neuroprotective drugs." LAU-0901. 2003
- United States Patent Application Serial No. 10/459,911: Inventors: Nicolas G. Bazan, Carlos Sunkel, Dennis Paul, Julio Alvarez-Builla and Assignee: LSUHSC, "Synergistic combinations including N-acylated 4-hydroxyphenylamine derivatives with caffeine." 2003
- United States Patent Application Serial No. 60/589,445: Inventors: Nicolas G. Bazan, Walter J. Lukiw, Charles N. Serhan*, and Assignee: LSUHSC, "Neuroprotective and anti-inflammatory bioactive docosaehexanoic acid mediators in Alzheimer' disease." 2004
- United States Patent Application Serial No. 10/911,835: Inventors: Nicolas G. Bazan, Charles N. Serhan, Victor L. Marcheselli, Pranab K. Mukherjee, Sebastian G. Barreiro, Walter J. Lukiw, Song Hong, Karsten Gronert, and Albert E. Musto and Assignee: LSUHSC, "Neuroprotectin D1 protects against cellular apoptosis, stroke damage, Alzheimer's disease and retinal diseases." 2004
- United States Patent Filed pending: Inventors: Salomon Esquenazi, Haydee E.P. Bazan, Nicolas G. Bazan and Assignee: LSUHSC, "Topical treatment with nerve growth factor and docosahexaenoic acid in corneal refractive surgery." 2004
- United States Patent No. 6,806,291; Inventors: Nicolas G. Bazan, Carlos Sunkel, Anthony Vaccarino, Julio Alvarez-Builla, and Assignee: LSUHSC, "Analgesic compounds, their synthesis and pharmaceutical compositions containing them"; and corresponding U.S. Patent Application Serial No. 10/682,744, filed October 9, 2003; and corresponding International Application No. PCT/US2004/033609, filed October 12, 2004.
- United States Patent Application Serial No. 10/292,105; Inventors: Nicolas G. Bazan, Carlos Sunkel, Dennis Paul, Julio Alvarez-Builla Gomez and Assignee: LSUHSC, "Synergistic combinations including N-acylated 4-hydroxyphenylamine derivates with caffeine"; published as U.S. Patent Application Publication No. 2004/0092541; and corresponding, International Application No. PCT/US2003/036039, filed November 12, 2003, and published as International Publication No. WO 2004/043460. 2004

== Other activities ==
In 2005, Bazan launched his family wine label, "Nicolas Bazan Wines." The project is a collaborative effort between Bazan and Mark Wahle. The Bazan block comprises 20 acres of the Holmes Hill vineyard site in Eola Hills, Oregon. Grapes for the Nicolas Bazan Wines are derived mainly from this block.

In 2009, Bazan published the novel Una Vida: A Fable of Music and the Mind, which follows the neuroscientist Alvaro Cruz as he attempts to uncover the mysterious past of a New Orleans street singer known as Una Vida. Stricken with Alzheimer's, she can only offer clues about her past through her singing. As Cruz searches for Una Vida's true identity, he learns about the human psyche, the nature of memory, and himself. This book was adapted into the 2014 film Of Mind and Music.
