= Josep Bazán =

Spanish water polo player (1933–2023)

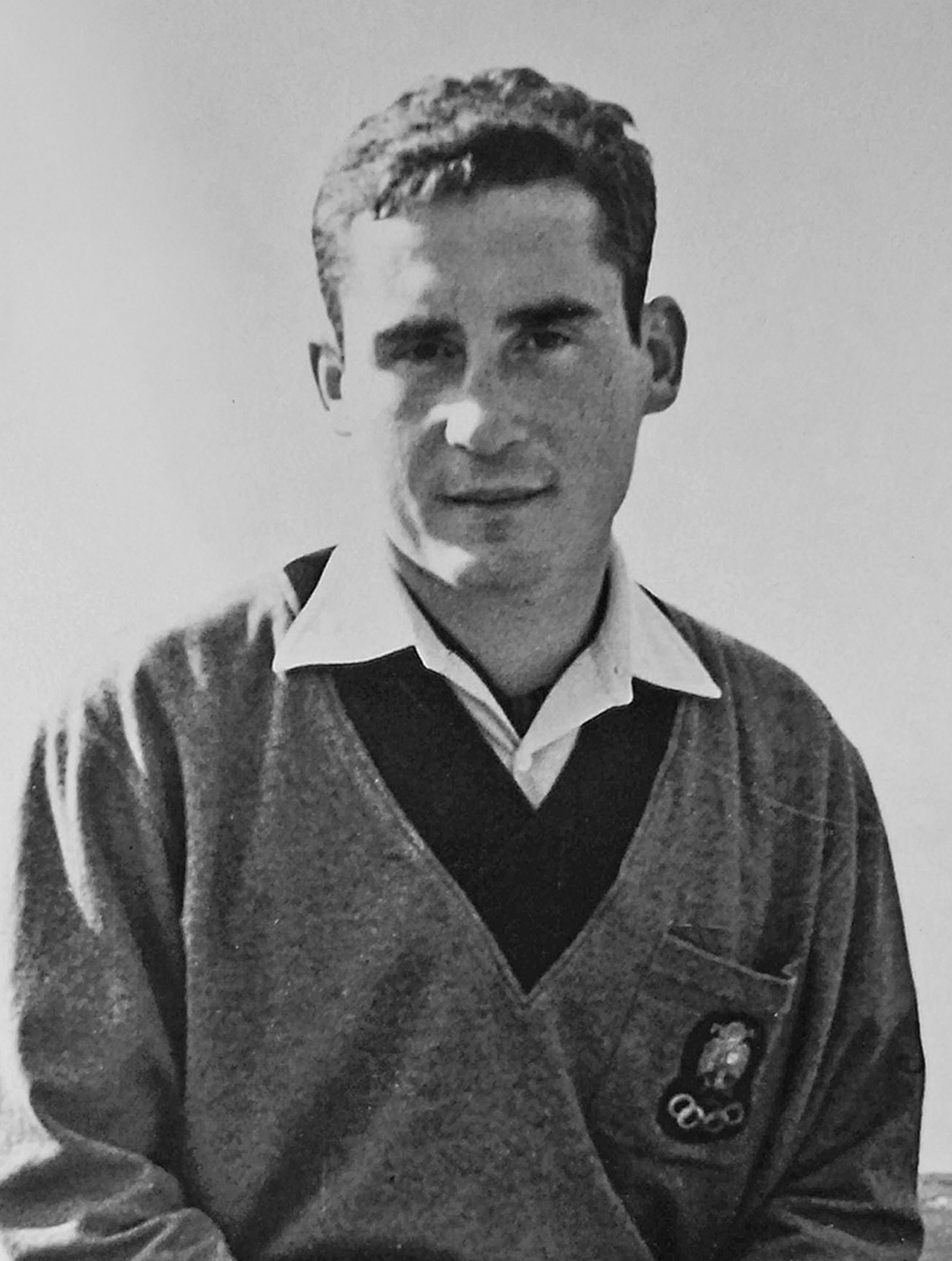

Personal information
- Born: 15 June 1933 Barcelona, Spain
- Died: 30 August 2023 (aged 90) Barcelona, Spain

Sport
- Sport: Water polo
Medal record
Mediterranean Games
Bronze medal – third place	1955 Barcelona	Team

Josep Bazán (15 June 1933 – 30 August 2023) was a Spanish water polo player. He competed in the men's tournament at the 1952 Summer Olympics. He won a bronze medal at the 1955 Mediterranean Games. Bazán died in Barcelona on 30 August 2023, at the age of 90.
