= Alexander Bassano =

English photographer (1829–1913)

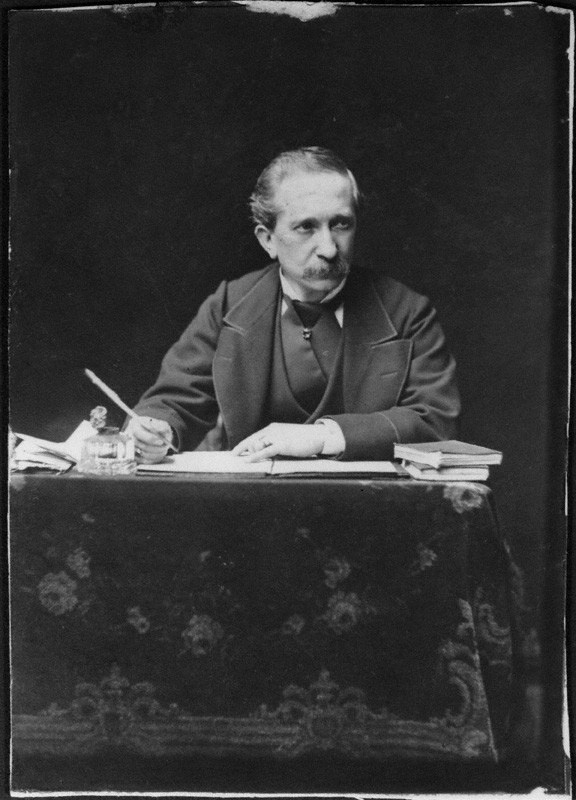
- Self portrait, c. 1890s
- Born: Alessandro Bassano; 1 May 1829; London, England
- Died: 21 October 1913 (aged 84); West Acton, London, England
- Occupation: Photographer
- Spouse: Adelaide Lancaster (m. 1850; died 1906)
- Children: 3
- Relatives: Louisa Bassano (sister)

Alexander Bassano (10 May 1829 – 21 October 1913) was an English photographer who was a leading royal and high society portrait photographer in Victorian London. He is known for his photo of the Earl Kitchener in the Lord Kitchener Wants You army recruitment poster during the First World War and his photographs of Queen Victoria.

== Biography ==
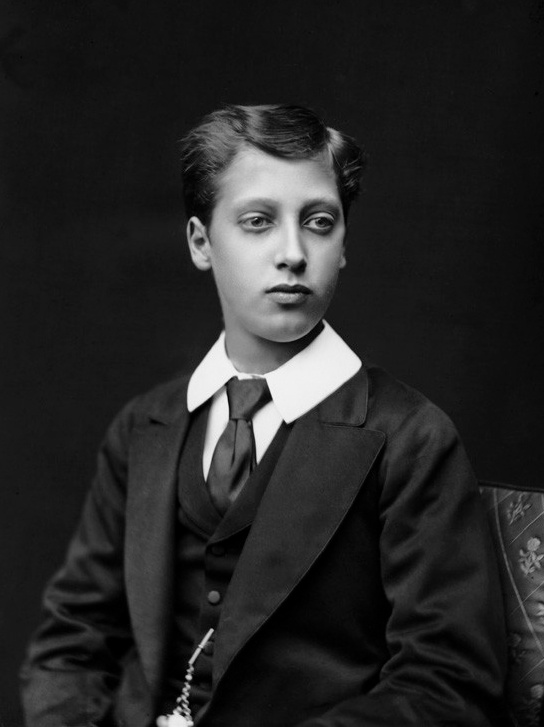
Photograph of Prince Albert Victor, 1875

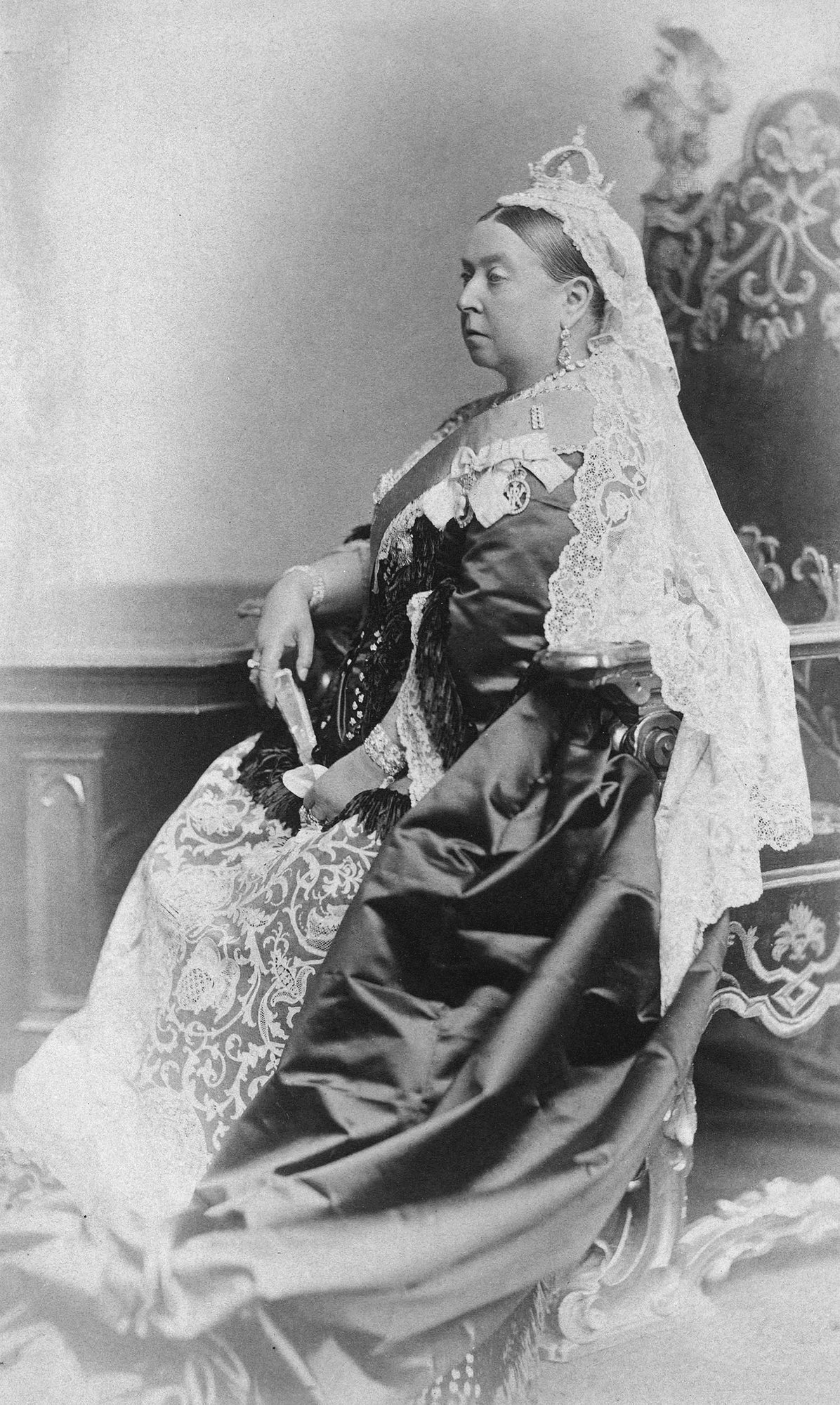
Photograph of Queen Victoria, 1882

Alessandro Bassano was the second-youngest child of Italian Clemente Bassano (originally a fishmonger of Cranbourne Street, later an oilman and warehouseman of Jermyn Street, London) and his English wife, Elizabeth Browne. He later anglicised his first name to Alexander.

Bassano received early artistic training with artists Augustus Egg and William Beverley. He opened his first studio in 1850 in Regent Street. The studio then moved to Piccadilly 1859–1863, to Pall Mall and then to 25 Old Bond Street in 1877. There was also a Bassano branch studio at 132 King's Road, Brighton from 1893 to 1899.

The Old Bond Street studio was decorated with carbon photographic prints and plaster busts and was large enough to accommodate an 80-foot panoramic background scene mounted on rollers, which provided a variety of outdoor scenes or court backgrounds. Bassano had taken portraits of William Ewart Gladstone and even monarchs such as Queen Victoria and Cetshwayo kaMpande. Bassano's headshot of Lord Kitchener formed the basis of the First World War recruiting poster Your Country Needs You. Bassano retired from work at the studio around 1903, when the premises were extensively refurbished and relaunched as Bassano Ltd, Royal Photographers.

The studio moved once again in 1921, a move written about by the Lady's Pictorial at the time. The article described about a million negatives, all systematically numbered, which had to be moved from the cellars of the premises to the new location at 38 Dover Street. The company became "Bassano and Vandyk" in 1964. The following year, it incorporated Elliott & Fry, a photographic partnership that had been running in Baker Street since 1863. In 1977, the company became Industrial Photographic. It was based at 35 Moreton Street, SW1.

Over 40,000 negatives from the Bassano Studios, including some by Alexander Bassano, are held in the National Portrait Gallery in London. The Museum of London holds a large number of fashion-related plates.

The National Portrait Gallery held an exhibit of Bassano’s work: Alexander Bassano: Victorian Photographer in 2013, the centenary of his death.

== Personal life ==
Bassano married Adelaide Rose Ainslie Lancaster (1825–1906) in 1850. They had a son, Clement George Alexander (1853–1899), and two daughters, Adelaide Fanny Louise (1850–1921) and Camilla Teresa ("Lily") (1859–1928). Portraits of his wife and children are held in the National Portrait Gallery in London.

His sister Louisa Bassano was a noted singer and teacher.

== Sources ==
- Pritchard, Michael (1994). A Directory of London Photographers 1841–1908. Watford: PhotoResearch. ISBN 978-0-952-30110-3.
