= Bazzani (footballer) =

Brazilian footballer

Personal information
- Full name: Olivério Bazzani Filho
- Date of birth: 3 June 1935
- Place of birth: Mirassol, Brazil
- Date of death: 13 October 2007 (aged 72)
- Place of death: Araraquara, Brazil
- Position: Midfielder

Youth career
- Rio Preto

Senior career*
Years	Team	Apps	(Gls)
1959–1962	Ferroviária		
1963–1965	Corinthians	90	(16)
1966–1973	Ferroviária		

Managerial career
- 1977: Ferroviária
- 1981: Ferroviária
- 1982: Ferroviária
- 1985: Ferroviária
- 1992: Ferroviária
- 1999: Ferroviária
- 2000: Ferroviária
- * Club domestic league appearances and goals as of 17 February 2024

Olivério Bazzani Filho (3 June 1935 – 13 October 2007), simply known as Bazzani (sometimes spelled as Bazani), was a Brazilian professional footballer and manager, who played as a midfielder.

== Career ==
An extremely classy midfielder, Bazzani is considered the greatest player in Ferroviária's history, with 758 matches and 244 goals. Frequently contested by other clubs, he always gave preference to Ferroviária, only leaving in 1963 for Corinthians, where he made 90 appearances and scored 16 goals. He even placed Pelé on the bench in some of the São Paulo state football team, in addition to having participated in the conquests of the second division in 1959 and 1966, in addition to having crowned Ferroviária as the best countryside team of Campeonato Paulista in 1967, 1968 and 1969. He also worked as a coach at Ferroviária during the 1980s.

== Personal life ==
Bazzani is son of Olivério Bazzani, defender of SC Corinthians in 1930s, and brother of Bazzaninho. He graduated in dentistry in Araraquara, while still playing.

== Honours ==
Ferroviária

- Campeonato Paulista Série A2: 1955, 1966

== Death ==
Bazzani died of kidney failure on 13 October 2007.
