= Bazzano =

Bazzano may refer to:

== Places ==
- Bazzano, L'Aquila, a frazione of L'Aquila in the Italian region Abruzzo
- Bazzano, Neviano degli Arduini, a frazione of the commune Neviano degli Arduini in the Italian province of Parma
- Bazzano, Valsamoggia, a frazione and commune seat of Valsamoggia in the Italian region Emilia-Romagna
- Bazzano Island, a small, uninhabited island in Antarctica

== People ==
- Charlie Bazzano (1923–2014), Australian cyclist
- Miguel Bazzano, Uruguayan footballer
