= Rose Ethel Bassin =

Scottish music educator (1889–1974)

Rose Ethel Bassin LRAM, ARCM
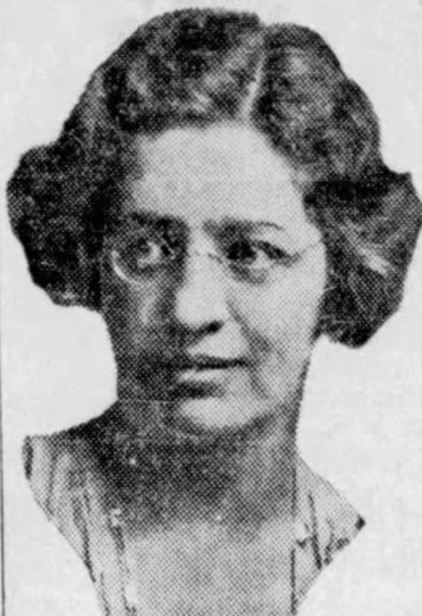
- Rose Ethel Bassin, from a 1933 publication
- Born: 1889; Edinburgh
- Died: 1974
- Other names: Ethel Bassin
- Occupation(s): Biographer, music educator, folklorist
- Father: Elieser Bassin

Rose Ethel Bassin (1889 – 29 April 1974), LRAM, ARCM, was a Scottish writer, music educator, and folklorist, known for her work in British Columbia in the 1930s, and for her biography of folklorist Frances Tolmie, published posthumously in 1977.

== Early life and education ==
Bassin was born in Edinburgh, the daughter of Elieser Bassin and Fanny Bassin. Her father was an immigrant from Russia; he was raised in a Jewish household, but became a Christian convert and missionary as a young man. She attended George Watson's Ladies College in Edinburgh, and earned certificates at the Royal Academy of Music in Manchester and London. In 1915, she was the first graduate of the music teacher training program at Moray House. She studied music under Marjory Kennedy-Fraser.

== Career ==
Bassin taught at schools in Scotland and England, including stints in the Hebrides. From 1927 to 1934 she was a lecturer at the University of British Columbia. While she was teaching in western Canada, she wrote a play for the Vancouver Sea Music Festival in 1930, directed musical pageants, lectured and wrote about music, judged folk music competitions, collected and arranged folk songs, and performed in concerts as a singer and a pianist. In 1935, she was hired to teach music to unemployed girls in Glasgow. She also edited a magazine, Rural Music, for the Federation of Rural Music Schools.

Bassin retired from schoolwork in 1949, but continued to teach privately, and give talks about her work. She was a subscribing member of the Gaelic Society of Inverness, and contributed articles to academic journals such as the Journal of the English Folk Dance and Song Society and Scottish Studies. She was a member of the Scottish School Music Association in the 1940s. Poet Sorley MacLean was one of her students. Her last and most substantial work, a biography of Frances Tolmie, was published posthumously in 1977.

== Publications ==
- "Gaelic Mods in the Western Isles" (1938)
- "Old Devonshire House is Now Museum and Center for Study of Old Instruments and Music" (1938)
- "Frances Tolmie (1840–1926)" (1948)
- "Margaret Kennedy-Fraser and Songs of the Hebrides" (1948)
- "The Tolmie Manuscripts" (1951)
- "Frances Tolmie and Her Songs" (1960)
- "The Tolmie Journal: A Note on the Corrigenda" (1961)
- The Old Songs of Skye: Frances Tolmie and her Circle (1977)

== Personal life ==
Bassin died in 1974, at the age of 85. There is a collection of her papers housed at the National Library of Scotland.
