= Elieser Bassin =

Russian-Jewish author (1840–1898)

Elieser Bassin (1840–1898) was a Russian-Jewish convert to Christianity, and an author and proponent of British Israelism.

== Life ==
Born in 1840 to a wealthy Russian Jewish family in Mogilev (present day Belarus) Elieser later converted to Christianity in 1869 and became a missionary and member of the "London Jewish Society for Promoting Christianity Among the Jews". He later moved and settled in Britain and through the literature of Edward Hine became a proponent of British Israelism. In 1885 Bassin was appointed as the first director of the "Scottish Home Mission to the Jews" in Edinburgh, a position he held until his death in 1898. Bassin's daughter was folklorist and musician Rose Ethel Bassin.

== British Israelism ==
Elieser is credited as the first Jewish convert to British Israelism. In 1884 he delivered a lecture entitled "God's Dealings With His Chosen People Israel" to a crowd of British Israelites in Portobello, Edinburgh. In his book British and Jewish Fraternity Eleiser equated Britain with the Israelite tribe of Ephraim:

The Hebrew Scriptures point to the British Isles as the home of God's first-born (i.e. Ephraim, the collective name for the Ten Tribes, Jeremiah 31:9)...It is my conviction that Britain is the nation with whom God has from first to last identified Himself. I, an Israelite of the House of Judah claim you as Israelites of the House of Ephraim (Le. the House of Israel). As believers in the faithfulness of our covenant-keeping God, I call you to awake from your sleep.

== Works ==
- The modern Hebrew, and the Hebrew Christian (1882)
- British and Jewish Fraternity (1884)
- Lost Ten Tribes: Anglo-Israel by a Jew (1884)
- A finger-post to the way of salvation. An exposition from the Bible and Rabbinical books (1887)
- The Passover, as celebrated now by the Jews, compared with that celebrated by Christ and His disciples (1889)
