= Housing Authority of the City of Milwaukee =

Agency overview
- Formed: 1944
- Jurisdiction: Milwaukee, Wisconsin
- Agency executives: Antonio Perez, Secretary-Executive Director; Willie L. Hines Jr., Chairman, Board of Commissioners
- Website: www.hacm.org

The Housing Authority of the City of Milwaukee (HACM) is a municipal agency of Milwaukee, Wisconsin dedicated to providing public housing and services for residents of the city of Milwaukee. The agency was established in 1944 and is responsible to a board of commissioners appointed by the mayor.

== History ==
The Housing Act of 1937 created support for access to affordable housing nationwide and funding for local agencies. The Housing Authority of the City of Milwaukee (HACM) was established in 1944, and Parklawn became Milwaukee's first public housing development constructed by the Works Progress Administration (WPA). In 1948, HACM built Northlawn, Southlawn, and Berryland. These three developments were built to provide housing to World War II veterans and their families.

Throughout the 1950s and 1960s, HACM expanded by constructing new developments. Hillside Terrace became HACM's first high-rise building. The agency also built Westlawn, Wisconsin's largest public housing development, and Lapham Park, the first housing development created to meet the needs of elderly and disabled residents.

In the 1970s, Congress passed the Housing and Community Development Act, which included the Section 8 program. When implemented in Milwaukee, Section 8 allowed qualified residents to pay 30% of their income to participating private landlords with the difference subsidized by HACM.

After 2000, HACM began to use tax credits to support expanded access to affordable housing in the city. Low-income housing tax credits gave the agency access to development money to offset budget reductions in federal programs.

In 2003, Highland Park Projects was demolished and replaced by Highland Homes. Once holding 56 very large families crowded into a few row houses of small 5-bedroom units, the development became a group of single-family units within a mixed-income neighborhood of public housing and privately owned homes. The Highland Park towers were also replaced and became Highland Gardens, a 114-unit building for seniors and people with disabilities.

In 2004, HACM created the Education Initiative to improve school attendance, to link children and families to available resources such as tutoring or afterschool programs, and to encourage stronger parental involvement in each child's education. The program has improved attendance and increased graduation rates to over 92% between 2008 and 2012.

In 2005, HACM provided emergency shelter and assistance for over 100 displaced families and individuals after Hurricane Katrina.

== Developments ==
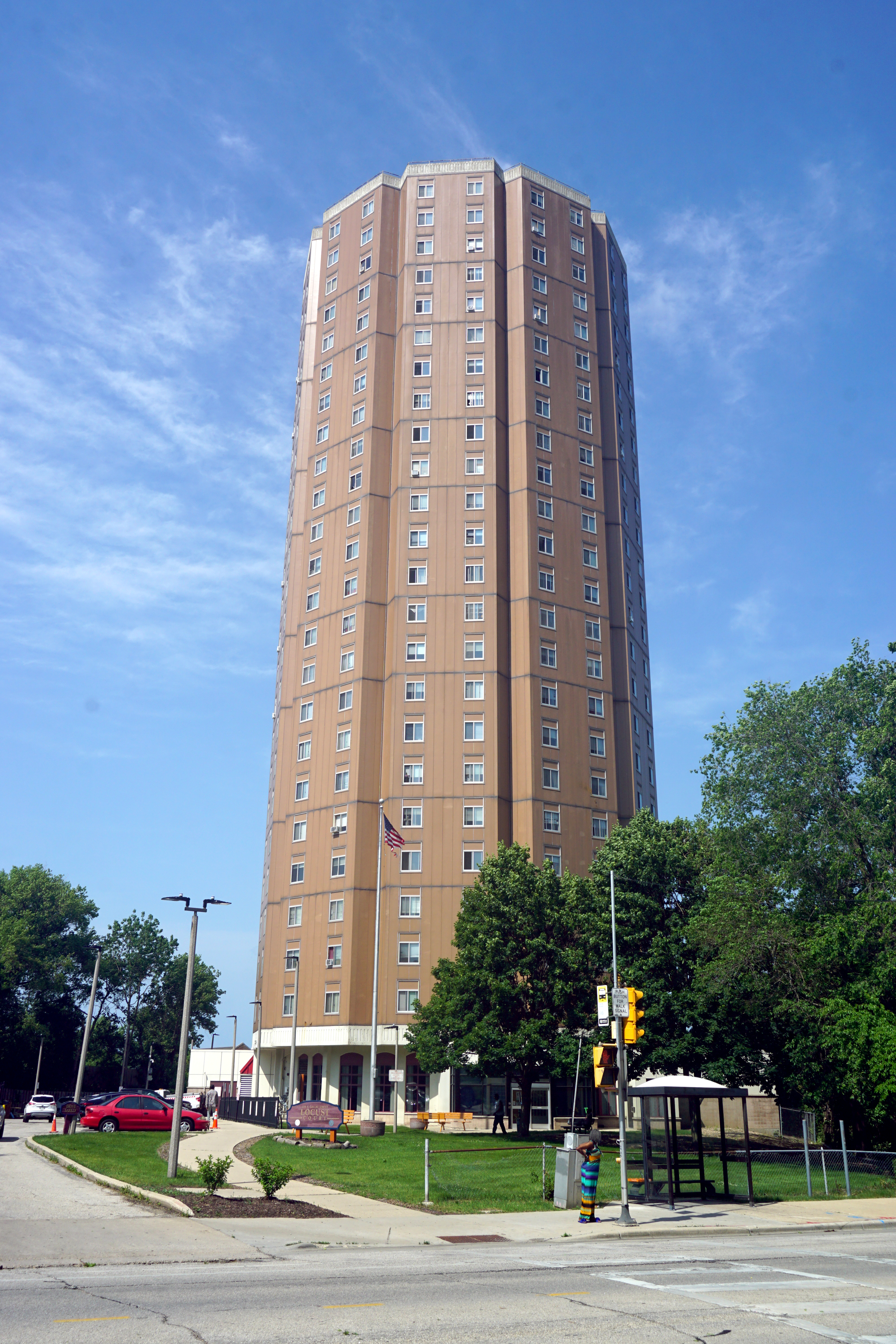
Locust Court

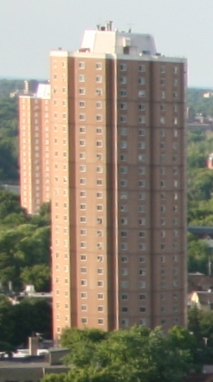
View of Arlington Court and Riverview developments on Milwaukee's Eastside.

HACM's developments provide low-income housing to the elderly, disabled, and families. HACM's first development was Parklawn, constructed at a cost of $2 million in 1944. By 1948, the agency had constructed Northlawn, Southlawn, and Berryland. During the 1950s, on land set aside for urban renewal, Hillside Terrace was completed. Wisconsin's largest public housing development is Westlawn. HACM completed the Lapham Park development in 1964 to house families, seniors, and disabled residents. Then in 1967, Highland Park was completed.

More recently, the agency has committed to creating sustainable developments. Highland Gardens, completed in 2004, was the first HACM development to be considered a green environment. The mid-rise building, located downtown, has 114 apartment units that are accessible to people with disabilities and also meet the needs of the elderly. Transitional living is available for people who were once living in nursing homes. The building was designed using sustainable materials. These materials include recycled flooring, energy saving designs, and live trees coming out of the floor in a common area. The roof of Highland Gardens has the nation's largest green roof. Rain gardens and landscaping also absorb and reduce stormwater runoff, preventing the possibility of sewer overflows.

Housing developments for elderly residents include Arlington Court, Becher Court, College Court, Convent Hill, Lapham Park, Merrill Park, and Mitchell Court. Housing developments for the elderly, disabled, and single persons include Hillside Terrace, Holton Terrace, Lincoln Court, Locust Court, and Riverview. Housing developments for families include Cherry Court and Highland Gardens. HACM also offers housing for moderate-income families at its Berryland development.

Developments	Street Address	# Units	Type
Arlington Court	1633 N. Arlington Place	230	Senior and disabled
Becher Court	1800 W. Becher Street	220	Senior
Berryland	6089 N. 42nd Street	391	Family
Cherry Court	1525 N. 24th Street	120	Senior and disabled
College Court	3334 W. Highland Blvd.	251	Senior and disabled
Convent Hill	455 E. Ogden Ave.	120	Senior
Highland Gardens	1818 W. Juneau Ave.	114	Senior and disabled
Highland Homes	1818 W. Juneau Ave.	56	Family
Hillside Terrace	1419 N. 8th Street	421	Family
Hillside Terrace Highrise	1545 N. 7th Street	49	Senior and disabled
Holton Terrace	2825 N. Holton Street	120	Senior and disabled
Lapham Park	1901 N. 6th Street	198	Senior
Townhomes at Carver Park	1901 N. 6th Street	122	Family
Lincoln Court	2325 S. Howell Ave.	110	Senior and disabled
Locust Court	1350 E. Locust Street	230	Senior and disabled
Merrill Park	222 N. 33rd Street	120	Senior and disabled
Mitchell Court	2600 W. National Ave.	100	Senior and disabled
Northlawn	5145 N. 20th Street	247	Family
Olga Village	722 W. Washington Street	37	Senior
Parklawn	4434 W. Marion Street	380	Family
Riverview	1300 E. Kane Place	180	Senior and disabled
Southlawn	3350 S. 25th Street	330	Family
Southlawn Park	3350 S. 25th Street	12	Family
Westlawn	6331 W. Silver Spring Drive	726	Family

== Leadership ==
HACM is run by a seven-member board of commissioners and its secretary-executive director. All seven members and the secretary-executive director are appointed to this position by the mayor and then confirmed by the Common Council. These members help run over 4,000 housing units.

Antonio Perez was appointed as the secretary-executive director in 2000 by Mayor John O. Norquist. Perez's professional experience includes work with the Milwaukee County Department of Health and Social Services and service as the founder and executive director of the Milwaukee Community Service Corps.

The Board of Commissioners also includes Mark Wagner, Ricardo Diaz, Sherri L. Daniels, Gloria Lott, Brooke VandeBerg, Dr. Susan Lloyd. Mark Wagner was appointed chairman of the Board 2014 and has over 45 years of experience in real estate, having worked for and managed offices for Merrill Lynch, Prudential, Better Homes and Gardens, Ogden and Company, and Craftmaster Contractors.

== Funding ==
HACM is federally funded through grants and by selling tax credits awarded to them by the state and federal government. In recent years, HACM has received substantial funding through HOPE VI grants awarded by the United States Department of Housing and Urban Development. The HOPE VI program was created to make physical improvements to public housing, improve management, and aid in community and social services to help meet the needs of residents.

== Awards ==
Several public housing developments as well as HACM as a whole have received awards and recognition from different programs, individuals, and magazines.

In 1993, Hillside Terrance was recognized by the Architectural Record magazine and the Congress for the New Urbanism. Five years later in 1998, HACM used the funding from HOPE VI's second grant to help create the award-winning Central City Cyberschool, which is a technology-based charter school for 350 students, half of whom live in Parklawn. In the same year, Mayor John Norquist presented HACM with the Mayor's Design Award for Parklawn's Monument Park. The park features a gazebo, restoration and exhibit of the original WPA limestone statues by Karl Kahlich (Music and Fishing), and historical storyboards. Following the Mayor's Design Award, the United States Department of Housing and Urban Development and United States Department of Health and Human Services awarded Hillside Terrace with the "Best Practice Awards" for the location's self-sufficiency programming and its enhanced services to elderly residents.

In 2000, Lapham Park's venture was a finalist for the 2000 Innovations in American Government award. Four years later, in 2004, Lapham Park's venture won the 2004 National Social Advocacy Award from the American Planning Association. In 2005, HACM was recognized with The World Leadership Award in the category of Housing as one of nine cities worldwide that is a model of affordable housing that transforms neighborhoods. In 2007, the Lapham Park venture won the 2007 Gold Award for Municipal Excellence from the National League of Cities. Two years later, HACM won three Awards of Merit from the National Association of Housing and Redevelopment Officials (NAHRO) for their family self-sufficiency program, drug abatement partnership with local police, and Lapham Park high-rise programming.

In 2011, the Wisconsin Top Projects Award was given to Olga Village. In 2012, The Real Estate Award also went to Olga Village, based on the project's unique impact on the community.

Other awards include the Sierra Club's Best New Development Honor to the Highland Gardens location. HACM also received the American Planning Association National Social Advocacy Award. A Milwaukee Award for Neighborhood Development Innovation was given to HACM. And the agency received recognition from the National Academy of Public Administration Award.
