= Basen, Armenia =

Village in Shirak, Armenia

Basen Բասեն
- Location within Armenia Location within Shirak
- Coordinates: 40°45′55″N 43°59′27″E
- Country: Armenia
- Province: Shirak
- Municipality: Akhuryan

Area
  - Total: 1.3 km^{2} (0.50 sq mi)
- Elevation: 1,645 m (5,397 ft)

Population (2011)
  - Total: 1,393
  - Density: 1,100/km^{2} (2,800/sq mi)
- Time zone: UTC+4 (GMT +4)
  - Summer (DST): UTC+5 (GMT+5)

Basen (Armenian: Բասեն) is a village in the Akhuryan Municipality of the Shirak Province of Armenia. The Statistical Committee of Armenia reported its population was 1,913 in 2010, up from 1,744 at the 2001 census.

== Etymology ==
The village was known as Mets Kyapanak until 1935.

== Demographics ==
Historical population
Year	Pop.	±% p.a.
1831	512	—
1897	1,892	+2.00%
1926	1,394	−1.05%
1939	1,667	+1.39%
1959	1,439	−0.73%
1970	1,606	+1.00%
1979	1,420	−1.36%
1989	1,393	−0.19%
2001	1,744	+1.89%
2011	1,393	−2.22%
