= Edvin Liverić-Bassani =

Edvin Liverić-Bassani (born 20 November 1970) is a Croatian theatre, television, film actor, dancer, performer and cultural manager.

== Career ==
Edvin Liverić-Bassani graduated from the Academy of Dramatic Arts in Zagreb in 1995 and for some time he was a member of Croatian National Theatre in Varaždin. In 1995 he was under recurring status in the ZKM (Zagrebačko kazalište mladih). From 1996 to 2005 Liverić taught "The Scene Movement" at the Academy of Dramatic Arts.

He is a member of The Croatian Dance Institute, where he works as a selector and the personal assistant to the Festival's Art Director. In 2003 he worked as the Art Director for the Street Art Festival in Poreč, as well as Co-Founder of a theatre group TRAFIK with whom he created the award-winning play Hodač ("The Walker") which pays homage to Janko Polić Kamov.

He has worked throughout the years in many theatre productions in Croatia and in Slovenia. Liverić-Bassani also appeared in many films, both foreign and Croatian, for instance: Balko, Svjetsko čudovište, Konjanik, La Femme Musketeer. He has debuted as a director in several theatre plays, such as: Bračni prizori by I. Bergman (Theatre &TD), Eva Braun and Igre u dvorištu (Theatre EXIT), Draga Elena Sergejevna (Theatare ŠKUC/Glej – Ljubljana), Draga Elena Sergejevna (ZKM) i Pozdrav s Jadrana (TRAFIK). He received the Vladimir Nazor Award for the play "Imago".

He made several appearances in TV shows, sitcoms and Soaps, for example: Kazalište u kući, Ljubav u zaledju, Cimmer Fraj, |Bitange i princeze, but he became known to a wider audience as the witty and sharp designer Aleks Kralj on a short lived Croatian version of Ugly Betty, Ne daj se, Nina.

In 2018 he was appointed a director of HKD in Sušak, Rijeka.

== Plays ==
- Najbolja juha! Najbolja juha!
- Veliki Gatsby
- Viktor ili djeca na vlasti
- Ana Karenjina
- Draga Elena Sergejevna

== TV ==
2004	La Femme Musketeer as King's Private Servant
2005–2006	Ljubav u zaledju as Claude D'artmant/Ivica Kausuric
2004	Kazalište u kući as Antonio
2007	Cimmer Fraj as Monsere
2007	Bitange i princeze as Inspektor Zinedine
2007–2008	Ne daj se, Nina as Aleks Kralj
2008	Ponos Ratkajevih as Italian Fascist

== Films ==
2003	Svjetsko cudoviste
2003	Konjanik
1999	Bardo Thodol - Tibetanska knjiga mrtvih
1997	Zagorje, dvorci
